= Rulah, Jungle Goddess =

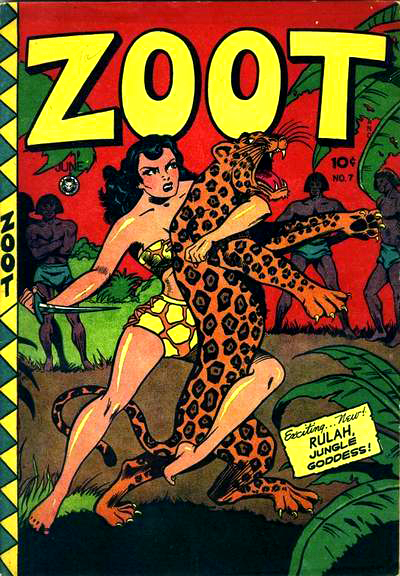
- Rulah on the cover of Zoot #7 (June 1947), art by Jack Kamen.

Publication information
- Publisher: Fox Feature Syndicate
- First appearance: Zoot Comics #7 (June 1947)
- Created by: Unknown

In-story information
- Alter ego: (originally) Jane Dodge (after Rulah, Jungle Goddess #20) Joan Grayson
- Species: Human
- Abilities: Normal human strength

Rulah, Jungle Goddess is a fictional character, a jungle girl, in comic books published by Fox Feature Syndicate. She first appeared in Zoot Comics #7 (June 1947). The cover of her debut issue was illustrated by Jack Kamen; however, the writer and artist responsible for her origin story remain unknown.

In addition to Kamen, Rulah was illustrated by several notable artists, including Matt Baker and Edmond Good. While the Grand Comics Database lists Matt Baker as a possible contributor to Rulah's origin, his involvement remains uncertain.

Rulah was inspired by a boom in jungle girl comics in the late 1940s, headed by Fiction House's Sheena, Queen of the Jungle.

== Character background ==
Rulah's real name was given variously as either Jane Dodge or Joan Grayson. In the former version, she is a young aviator on a solo flight over Africa when her plane loses control and crashes. She replaces her clothes (which were destroyed in the crash) with a bikini made from the skin of a dead giraffe. Soon afterwards, she saves a local tribe from an evil woman, and is accepted as its queen, who remains in the jungle as its protector. She is often accompanied by her pet panther, Saber. Her ex-boyfriend, Tim Pointer, is introduced in issue #20.

According to Jess Nevins' Encyclopedia of Golden Age Superheroes, "she tackles ordinary enemies, like wild animals, wicked natives, and wicked whites, and extraordinary enemies, like the Harpies from Hades, the Panther Queen, the Thirsty Tyrant of Tii, the Jungle Napoleon, the Ice Vikings of Valhalla, and the Ape Women of Antilla".

== Publication history ==
Rulah appeared in each issue of Zoot Comics after issue #7. By issue #17, Zoot was retitled Rulah, Jungle Goddess. She also appeared in All Top Comics, alongside Dagar, the Desert Hawk, and the Blue Beetle. Her last appearance in her own title was issue #27 (June 1949), after which it became a romance comic renamed I Loved. All Top was canceled in July 1949.

After the demise of Fox Feature Syndicate, some of Rulah's adventures were reprinted without permission by Star Comics (no relation to the Marvel Comics imprint), and I. W. Publications, under the Super Comics and Skywald Comics lines.

The last original story featuring Rulah published by AC Comics is "Clash of Gods", written by Enrico Teodorani and drawn by Antonio Conversano, published in 2004 in Femforce # 129.

In 2011, Rulah was ranked 79th in Comics Buyer's Guide's "100 Sexiest Women in Comics" list.
