= The Desert Hawk =

The Desert Hawk may refer to:

- The Desert Hawk (1924 film), American silent western film
- The Desert Hawk (serial), 1944 American film, part of Columbia film serial
- The Desert Hawk (1950 film), American film
- Dagar, the Desert Hawk, a fictional character in comic books published by Fox Feature Syndicate

== See also ==
- Desert Hawk (disambiguation)
