= Blue Beetle (film) =

2023 superhero film by Ángel Manuel Soto

- Theatrical release poster
- Directed by: Ángel Manuel Soto
- Written by: Gareth Dunnet-Alcocer
- Based on: Characters from DC
- Produced by: John Rickard; Zev Foreman
- Starring: Xolo Maridueña; Adriana Barraza; Damián Alcázar; Raoul Max Trujillo; Susan Sarandon; George Lopez
- Cinematography: Pawel Pogorzelski
- Edited by: Craig Alpert
- Music by: Bobby Krlic
- Production companies: Warner Bros. Pictures; DC Films; The Safran Company
- Distributed by: Warner Bros. Pictures
- Release dates: August 14, 2023 (El Paso, Texas); August 18, 2023 (United States)
- Running time: 127 minutes
- Country: United States
- Languages: English; Spanish
- Budget: $104–125 million (Note: Deadline Hollywood reported that Blue Beetle had a budget of $104 million, while Variety reported a $125 million figure, and TheWrap reported it cost $120 million.)
- Box office: $130.8 million

Blue Beetle is a 2023 American superhero film based on the DC Comics character Jaime Reyes / Blue Beetle. Directed by Ángel Manuel Soto and written by Gareth Dunnet-Alcocer, it is the 14th film in the DC Extended Universe (DCEU). Xolo Maridueña stars as Reyes, a recent college graduate who is granted superpowers by an ancient alien relic known as the Scarab. Adriana Barraza, Damián Alcázar, Raoul Max Trujillo, Susan Sarandon, and George Lopez also star in the film. John Rickard and Zev Foreman produced the film for DC Films and Warner Bros. Pictures.

Development of a film featuring the Jaime Reyes version of Blue Beetle began by the end of November 2018, with Dunnet-Alcocer attached as screenwriter. Soto was hired to direct the film in February 2021 for the streaming service HBO Max. Maridueña was cast that August, and the film was changed to have a theatrical release in December. Further casting took place in early 2022, and filming lasted from late May to mid-July at Wilder Studios in Decatur, Georgia, as well as in El Paso, Texas, and Puerto Rico. It is the first live-action superhero film with a Latino lead.

Blue Beetle premiered in El Paso on August 14, 2023, and was released in the United States on August 18. The film received generally positive reviews from critics and became the most-watched film on HBO Max in the United States. Nevertheless, the film underperformed at the box office, grossing $130.8 million worldwide against a production budget of $104–125 million, which made it the lowest-grossing film in the DCEU. Its box office performance was attributed to factors such as the 2023 Hollywood labor disputes, the franchise's imminent reboot with the DC Universe (DCU), and Hurricane Hilary. An animated follow-up television series set in the DCU is in development, while Maridueña will reprise his role in the DCU film Man of Tomorrow (2027).

== Plot ==
In Antarctica, members of Kord Industries, led by its co-founder and CEO Victoria Kord, locate an ancient alien artifact known as the Scarab. Meanwhile, Jaime Reyes returns to his hometown of Palmera City after graduating from Gotham Law University, only to learn that his family is facing eviction from their home due to financial difficulties. Jaime's sister Milagro manages to get him a job at Victoria's mansion. However, both are fired after Jaime stops a confrontation between Victoria and her niece, Jenny. Jenny later tells Jaime to meet her at Kord Tower the next day to discuss a "job opportunity".

The next day, Jenny finds that Victoria is using the Scarab for her One Man Army Corps (OMAC) projects. She steals the Scarab and avoids security by giving it to Jaime, hidden inside a Big Belly Burger to-go box. At home, Jaime's family convinces him to open the box, and when Jaime holds the Scarab, it activates and fuses with him, encasing him in an exoskeleton. After getting launched from the stratosphere to all over the city, Jaime tracks down Jenny for answers, rescuing her from Victoria's armed forces. She tells Jaime that the Scarab is a sentient weapon and has chosen Jaime as its host. With the help of Jaime's uncle Rudy, Jaime and Jenny break into Kord Tower to retrieve a smartwatch that once belonged to Jenny's father Ted, but are attacked by Victoria's bodyguard Ignacio Carapax, who has an OMAC prototype infused in his body. The Scarab, revealed to be named Khaji-Da, temporarily takes over Jaime's body and battles Carapax, but Jaime refuses to let it kill Carapax. Rudy and Jenny help incapacitate Carapax, before they escape with Jaime to Jenny's childhood home.

Jenny uses Ted's watch to activate his secret laboratory and reveals that Ted was a vigilante named Blue Beetle who spent his life studying Khaji-Da before mysteriously disappearing, leaving his company in Victoria's hands. When they notice Victoria's helicopter flying toward Jaime's home, Jaime summons Khaji-Da and returns to protect his family, but Jaime's father, Alberto, collapses and dies from a heart attack, distracting Jaime and allowing Carapax and Victoria to capture him. Jaime is taken to an island fortress near Cuba, where he is strapped to a machine that downloads information from Khaji-Da into the OMACs. While unconscious, Jaime experiences a vision from Alberto in the afterlife, who encourages him to embrace his destiny as the new Blue Beetle.

While Jenny and the Reyes family use Ted's Bugship and its weapons arsenal to storm the island, Jaime awakens and escapes as Carapax's OMAC suit evolves into a more powerful form. Jaime reunites with his family, then encounters Carapax and battles him. After Carapax attempts to shoot Rudy when he aids his nephew, an enraged Jaime nearly kills Carapax but is stopped by Khaji-Da, who shows him Carapax's memories obtained during the information transfer, from which Jaime learns of Carapax's tragic past, including his enslavement by Victoria for the OMAC experiments and the inadvertent death of his mother at her hands. Moved by this revelation, Jaime spares Carapax, who is prompted to turn on Victoria and sets his OMAC suit to explode and destroy the island, himself, and Victoria, as vengeance for his mother. As the Reyes family escapes the island, they finally take time to mourn Alberto.

In the aftermath, Jenny becomes the new CEO of Kord Industries and promises to repair the damage caused to the Reyes family by helping them rebuild their home. As the neighbors gather around the remains of the Reyes family's home and provide support, Jaime kisses Jenny and then offers to fly her to the Kord Estate. In a mid-credits scene, a distorted recording is broadcast in Ted's laboratory, attempting to inform Jenny he is alive.

== Cast ==
- Xolo Maridueña as Jaime Reyes / Blue Beetle: A recent college graduate who gains superpowers when an alien Scarab grafts onto him, forming a powerful reconfiguring exoskeleton around his body.
- Adriana Barraza as Nana: Jaime's grandmother, who is a former revolutionary.
- Damián Alcázar as Alberto Reyes: Jaime's father.
- Elpidia Carrillo as Rocio Reyes: Jaime's mother.
- Bruna Marquezine as Jenny Kord: The daughter of Ted Kord and Jaime's love interest.
- Raoul Max Trujillo as Ignacio Carapax / OMAC: A lieutenant and bodyguard working for Victoria Kord.
- Susan Sarandon as Victoria Kord:
  The CEO of Kord Industries and the sister of Ted Kord who is hellbent on acquiring the Scarab. Sarandon says Victoria represents the theme of "imperialism in the name of democracy", and that she is driven by a need to be ambitious and prove herself after her brother mysteriously disappears and leaves his company behind.
- George Lopez as Rudy Reyes: Jaime's uncle.
- Belissa Escobedo as Milagro Reyes: Jaime's younger sister
- Harvey Guillén as Dr. Jose Francisco Morales Rivera de la Cruz / "Dr. Sanchez": A scientist who works for Victoria.

Additionally, Becky G provides the voice of Khaji-Da, a sentient entity that imbues and controls the Scarab, while Bobby McGruther has a voice-only cameo as Ted Kord, a previous Blue Beetle, in the mid-credits scene.

== Production ==
=== Development ===
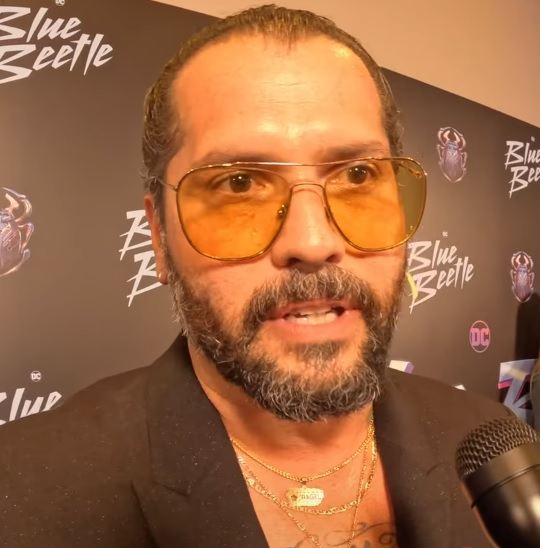
Ángel Manuel Soto, the director of Blue Beetle

Warner Bros. Pictures and DC Films were developing a film based on Jaime Reyes / Blue Beetle by the end of November 2018, with Mexican-born Gareth Dunnet-Alcocer writing the screenplay. Zev Foreman was executive producing the project for Warner Bros., and it was set to be the first DC Extended Universe (DCEU) film as well as the first live-action superhero film starring a Latino lead. By December 2020, DC Films was planning to release several mid-budget films a year exclusively on the streaming service HBO Max, rather than in movie theaters, as part of new DC Films president Walter Hamada's plan for the DCEU, with Blue Beetle listed as one such project in 2021. Puerto Rican director Ángel Manuel Soto was hired to direct the film in February 2021. He had pitched various ideas, including a film about the Batman character Bane's origin story, when contacted by Warner Bros., but the studio had intended for him to direct the Blue Beetle film. In April, Blue Beetle was included on DC's slate of films that were expected to be released in 2022 or 2023. Soto explained that while the decision to release Blue Beetle on streaming was influenced by the COVID-19 pandemic's effects on the availability of movie theaters, the creative team intended to make the film suited for a theatrical experience.

John Rickard, the president of production at the Safran Company, was producing the film for HBO Max by that August, when filming was expected to begin in early 2022. In December 2021, Warner Bros. revealed that the film would be receiving a theatrical release in August 2023 instead of being produced directly for HBO Max. Though the film was originally intended to be released as an HBO Max exclusive, the studio decided to release it theatrically after they enjoyed Soto's creative vision. In mid-April 2022, Soto and cinematographer Pawel Pogorzelski visited El Paso, Texas, to meet with local artists, muralists, musicians, and historians to understand the feel of the city. Peter Safran was revealed as a producer that October, having worked on the film before he was hired as the co-chairman and co-CEO of DC Studios alongside James Gunn that month; Rickard and Foreman were ultimately credited as the producers.

=== Writing ===
In October 2021, Soto said Dunnet-Alcocer's script featured "the Latino family at its core", while star Xolo Maridueña said in August 2022 that the family aspect of the film and character were "inherent to the comics" and felt had not been explored as much with other superhero films. Soto emphasized the film's focus on Latino representation, highlighting its central theme of family and cultural identity. He credited filmmakers such as Alfonso Cuarón and Guillermo del Toro for paving the way for Latino storytellers in Hollywood and sought to integrate aspects of Latin American culture throughout the film. Soto and screenwriter Gareth Dunnet-Alcocer, who is from Mexico, incorporated references like María la del Barrio and El Chapulín Colorado to reflect shared cultural touchstones. The film also includes historical references, such as the School of the Americas and U.S. intervention in Latin America, as part of the backstory for the antagonist, Conrad Carapax. Soto did not want the film to be "another story where 15 minutes in, something happens, and 50 minutes later, he's dominating the experience, and by the end, he's saving the world" and instead wanted to explore his growth, saying that "He's [Reyes] not going to save the world yet; he doesn't deserve to yet". Soto and Dunnet-Alcocer had decided to do so by taking a grounded approach toward his character while exploring his relationship with his family and Khaji-Da, the symbiotic alien that provides Reyes's powers. Soto also took inspiration from DC's The New 52 comics, and the Mission: Impossible and Indiana Jones franchises.

For the scene in which Reyes's family witnesses his first transformation into Blue Beetle, Soto's intention was twofold: to humorously portray Latino families as "very nosy" while also showing that "family is [their] superpower to some extent". He wanted the film to be fun and described the transformation as a kid-friendly version of the body horror scenes in director David Cronenberg's films. He also focused on the pronunciation of names in the film, and included a scene in which Victoria Kord called an employee Sanchez despite it not being his name. The decision to include the scene was to show that "Latinos are not a monolith", with Soto further adding that the audience would feel the warmth of Reyes' family and become familiarized with them after the first act. Co-star Susan Sarandon revealed the following month that the film would have several scenes spoken in Spanish, with subtitles being provided. Soto affirmed this, saying the film would feature "Spanglish", saying Spanish will be used for scenes that feature elder characters and also when characters "speak from the heart". Soto had also stated that the film would explore Victoria Kord's relationship with her brother Ted Kord. He also stated that the presence of Ted's daughter, his gadgets, and the idea of Ted and Dan Garrett would also impact the film's story, although it would be contextualized through Reyes's perspective. Writer Gary Dauberman provided off-screen additional literary material for the film.

The film features large-scale worldbuilding, and is primarily set in the fictional Palmera City—which was an original creation for the film—rather than El Paso, Texas as is featured in the comics. Soto said this was to create a world specific to Jaime Reyes on a similar level to Metropolis for Superman and Gotham City for Batman, and to help position the character as "a potential leader" in DC Studios's new franchise and shared universe, the DC Universe (DCU), while stating that Gunn and Safran felt that the film could be included anywhere in the in-universe DCU timeline. Soto had explained that the creative team had created the city as a "metropolitan of Latinos", and that the city was divided into two parts: Reyes's neighborhood and the affluent financial district. He had also identified Reyes's upbringing as being more humble, as his family had come from the working class, had been struggling, and was also a part of "marginalized communities under the threat of gentrification". Inspiration for the film came from the video game Injustice 2 (2017) and the comic book storyline Infinite Crisis (2005–06), in which Jaime Reyes debuted, along with the comics in The New 52 for the design of the suit, while the comic book miniseries Blue Beetle: Graduation Day (2022–23) incorporated elements from the film, such as Palmera City and Victoria Kord.

=== Casting ===
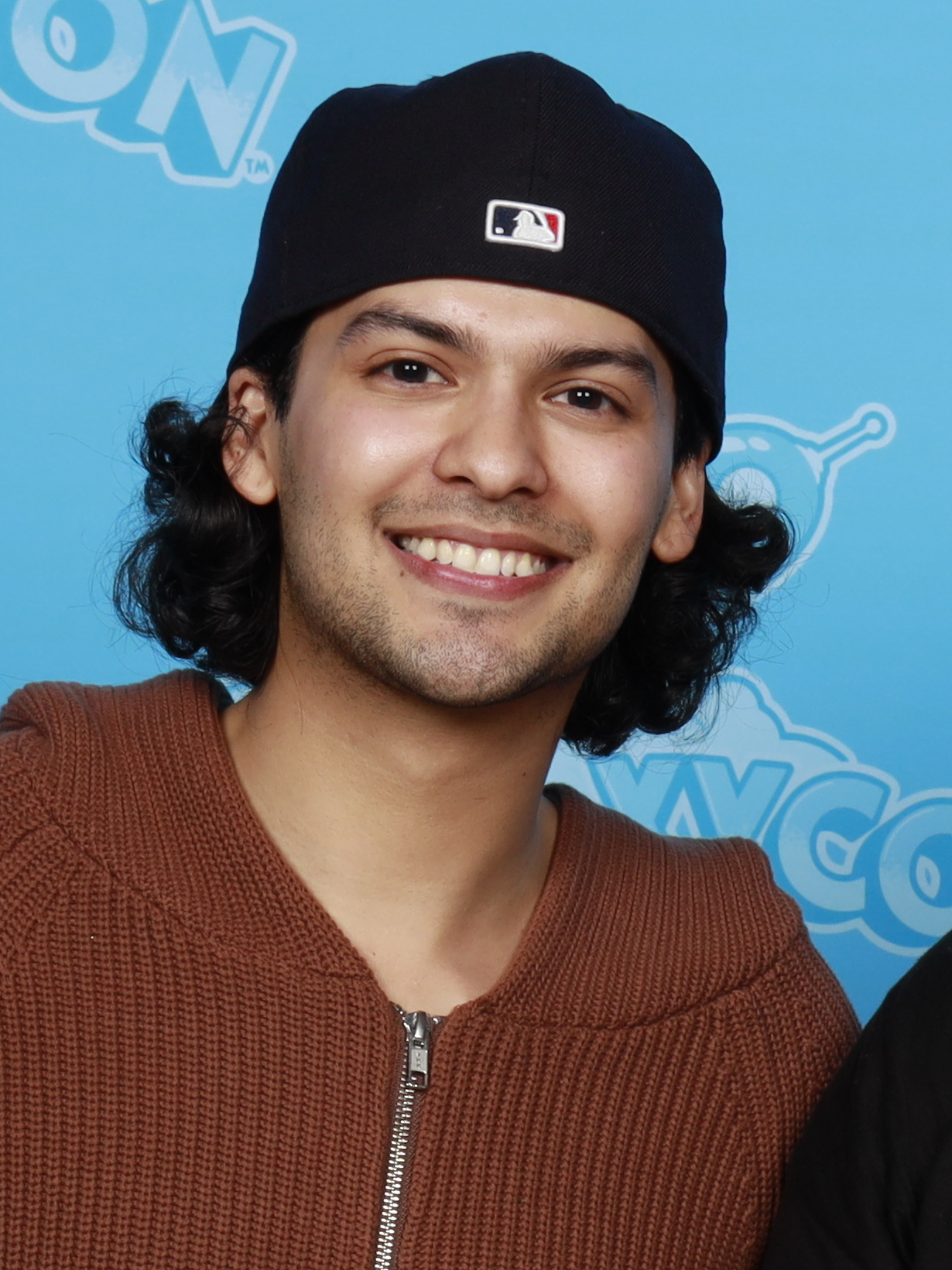
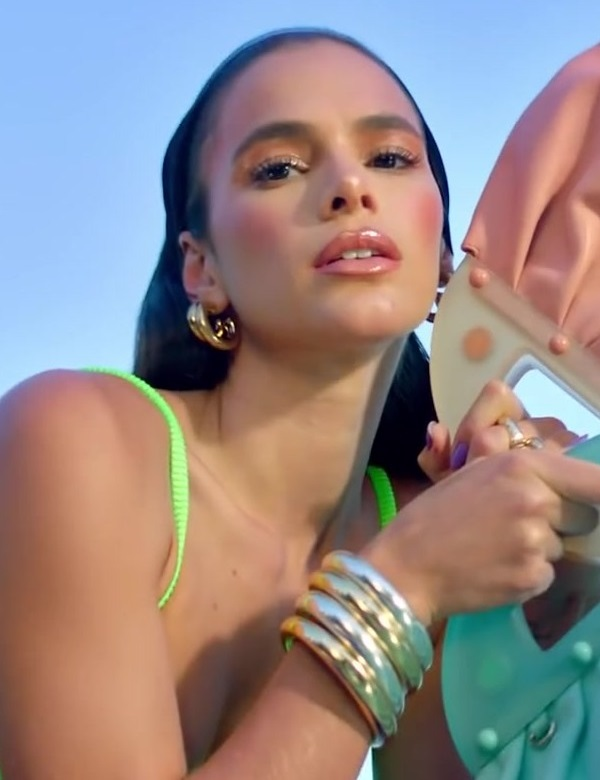
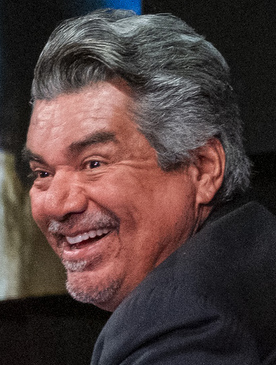
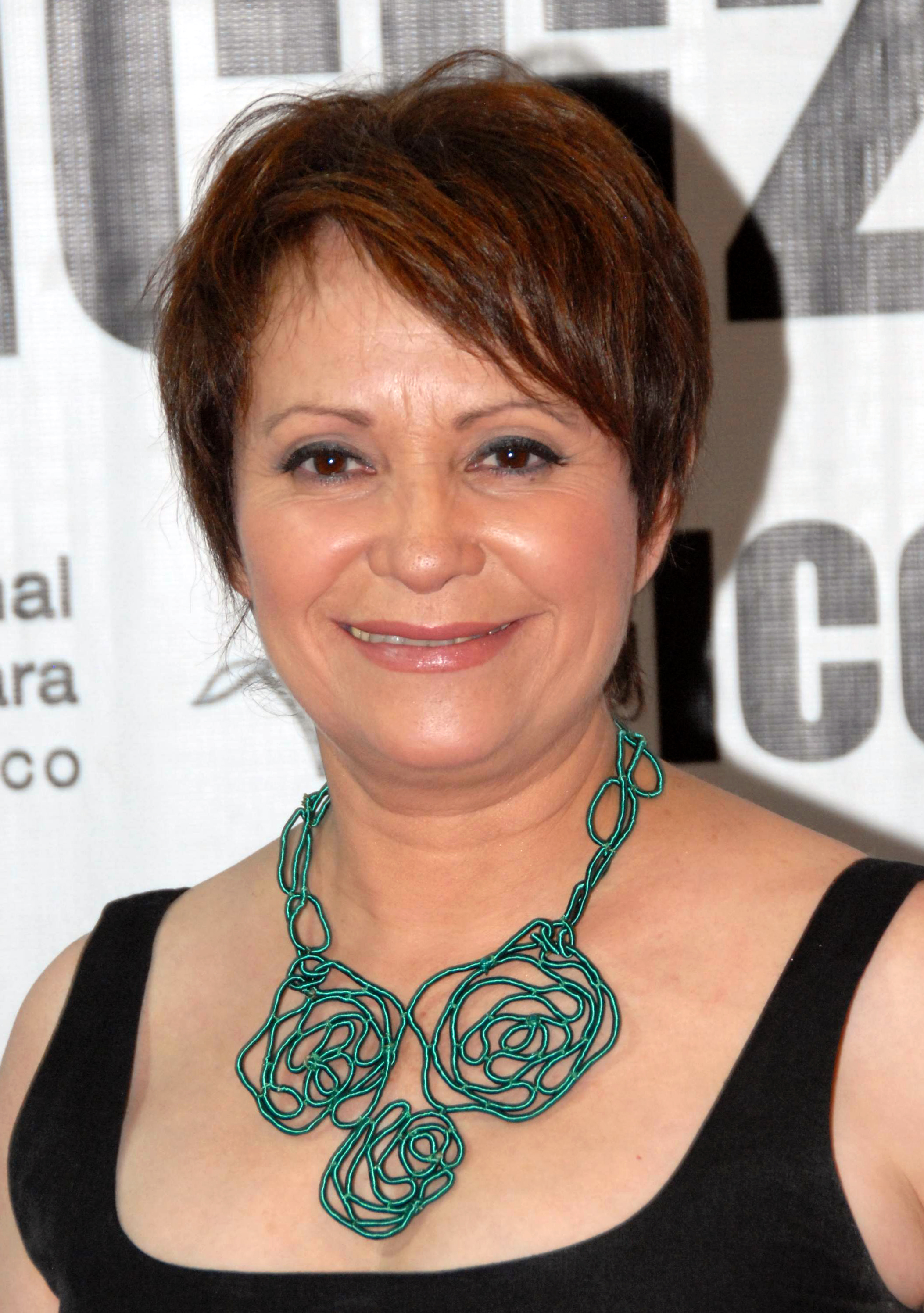
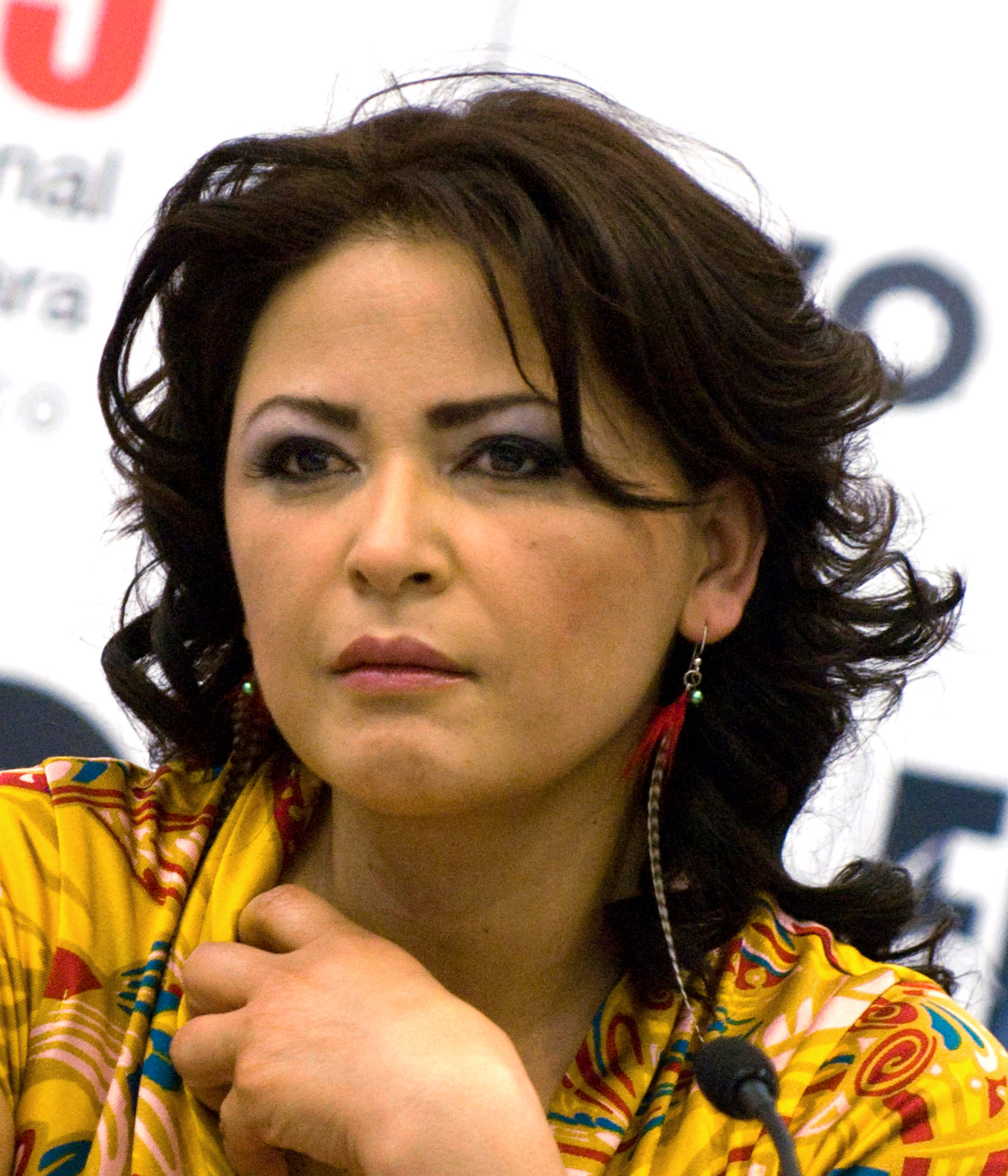
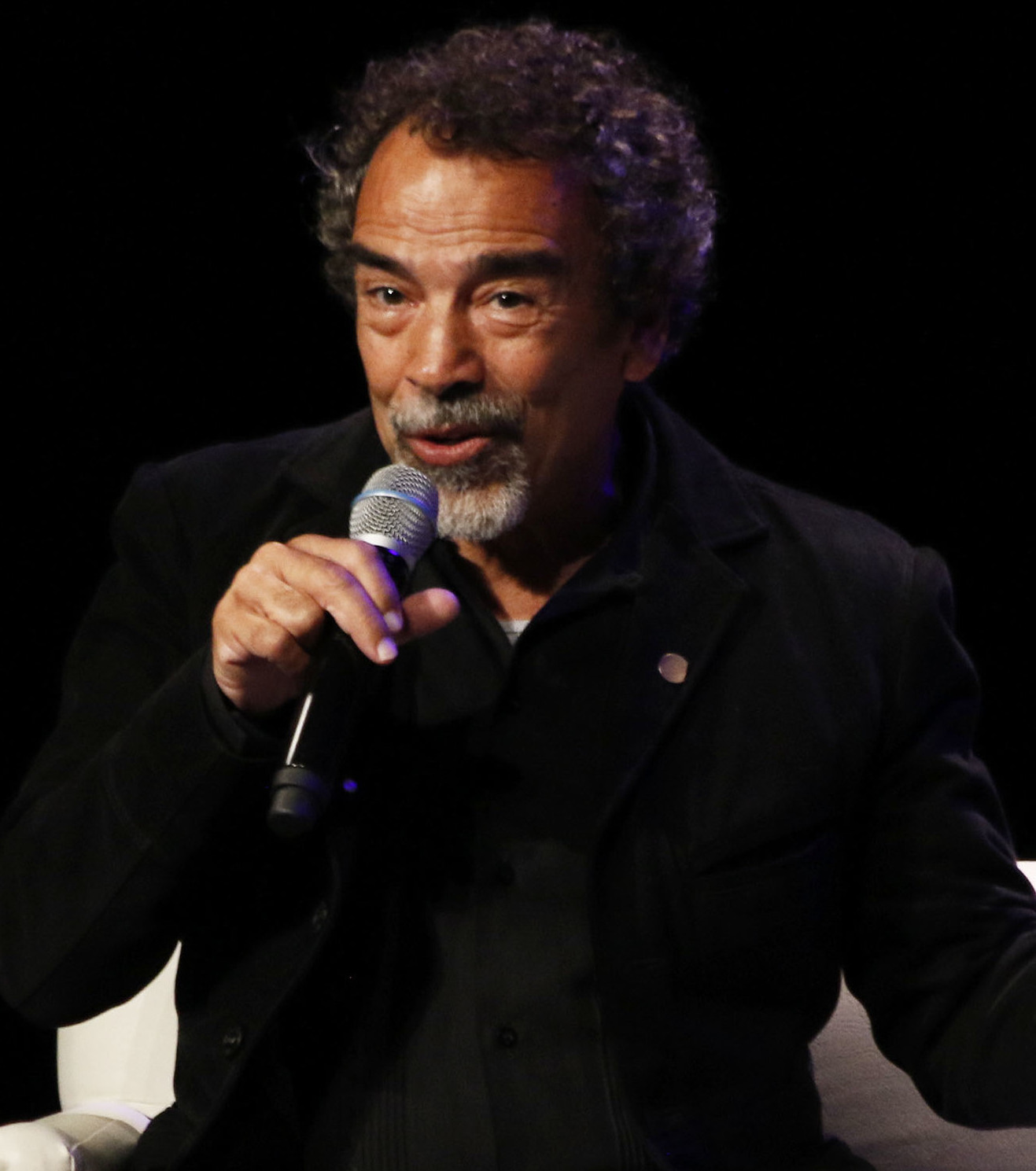
Blue Beetle stars Xolo Maridueña, Bruna Marquezine, George Lopez, Adriana Barraza, Elpidia Carrillo, and Damián Alcázar

Xolo Maridueña was Soto's first choice to portray Reyes, with Soto explaining that he "couldn't stop seeing [Maridueña] as the character" since he was hired to direct the film, enjoying his performance as Miguel Diaz in the Karate Kid television series Cobra Kai (2018–2025). He also noted that his experience with martial arts while filming Cobra Kai would help with his role as Blue Beetle. Soto and Warner Bros. offered the role to Maridueña on August 1, 2021, he was publicly revealed to be in talks for the film the next day, and his casting was officially confirmed later that day at the premiere for the DCEU film The Suicide Squad (2021). When learning of the role, Maridueña was most excited that Reyes is a Latino character and he could bring Latino representation to a superhero project.

In early March 2022, Bruna Marquezine was cast as Reyes's love interest, Jenny Kord, with Belissa Escobedo playing Reyes's sister Milagro, and Harvey Guillén cast as Dr. Delacruz. Later that month, the rest of Reyes's family was cast: George Lopez as uncle Rudy, Adriana Barraza as Nana, Elpidia Carrillo as Rocio, and Damián Alcázar as Alberto. Soto said he wanted to create an authentic Mexican family with real accents and experiences, and also wanted the elder members of the family to be portrayed by "beloved" Mexican actors from Latin American cinema who had also crossed over to United States cinema and paved the way for members of the younger generation, such as Maridueña and Escobedo. By the end of the same month, Sharon Stone was in talks to play the villain Victoria Kord, an original creation for the film which was believed to be the wife of Ted Kord, the second Blue Beetle in the comics. Raoul Trujillo also joined the cast as Carapax. In mid-April 2022, Susan Sarandon was cast as Victoria Kord after negotiations with Stone ended. In June 2023, Becky G announced that she would be providing the voice of Khaji-Da for the film.

=== Design ===
Blue Beetle's suit was designed by Mayes C. Rubeo and the team from Nine B Collective. The design team was inspired by artist Cully Hamner's original design of the comic book character and from his appearance in Infinite Crisis #3, the Injustice games, Young Justice, and Batman: The Brave and the Bold. They had difficulty making the mask fit Maridueña's full face while still allowing him to be emotive, particularly around the mouth. As such, the team had decided to merge the designs of organic alien technology and insectoid features within his suit. Visual inspiration for Palmera City came from Akira (1988), Neo Tokyo (1987), and Miami. Soto decided to insert a Nintendo Power Glove for Blue Beetle following the inclusion of a shield in the script.

=== Filming ===
Principal photography began by May 25, 2022, taking place in the Atlanta metropolitan area, primarily at Wilder Studios in Decatur, Georgia, using the working title Mofongo. Pawel Pogorzelski served as the cinematographer, using IMAX cameras. Christopher T.J. McGuire served as a camera and Steadicam operator, bringing experience from fellow superhero films The Suicide Squad (2021) and Guardians of the Galaxy Vol. 3 (2023). Given Blue Beetle's focus on family and culture, McGuire emphasized naturalistic handheld camerawork to enhance intimate moments while still employing superhero film staples, such as crane shots for large-scale action. Scenes for the film's third act took place at the Castillo San Felipe del Morro, a 500-year-old Spanish fortress located in the Old San Juan, Puerto Rico. Filming also occurred in El Paso. Sarandon completed filming her scenes by the end of June, and Trujillo said in early July that filming was almost complete.

Filming in the tight interiors of the bug-shaped spaceship required innovative camera work. Due to limited space, the crew relied heavily on slider-mounted cameras to allow for subtle motion without forcing actors to hit rigid marks. Additionally, they used a Chapman Leonard M7 crane with a low-profile head to achieve dynamic tracking shots. For the sequence where Jaime first bonds with the Scarab in his family's home, the crew primarily used handheld cameras to heighten the chaotic energy, particularly when Lopez's character is flung across the room. McGuire noted that actors like Maridueña and Barraza adjusted their performances to play-off the spontaneity of handheld shots. One of the film's standout action sequences, where Jaime's energy shields inadvertently slice a bus in half, was achieved using two physically separated halves of a real bus.

Filming at Castillo San Felipe del Morro in Puerto Rico proved logistically difficult, as all equipment had to be transported down steep stone steps via a pulley system. A particularly intricate shot inside the castle required a Jimmy Jib to descend into a narrow chamber as George Lopez and Belissa Escobedo's characters searched for Jaime. For one shot, the crew needed to get the camera as low as possible for a dramatic angle on Victoria Kord dropping a control device. Without a prism lens, they resorted to digging a small divot in the grass, only to later discover they had inadvertently damaged a national heritage site, resulting in a $10,000 fine. Filming wrapped on July 18 in Puerto Rico. Two days of additional photography took place in February 2023. The film was primarily shot on location with a heavy use of practical effects, such as for the Blue Beetle suit. Soto felt that the use of real-life locations allowed for the practical effects to be better integrated into the film. He said he wanted to prevent the film from relying too heavily on visual effects, which he described as "a tool, not a dependency", to avoid overworking the visual effects artists.

=== Visual effects and editing ===
Craig Alpert edited the film while Kelvin McIlwain served as the visual effects supervisor, after previously collaborated on the DCEU films Aquaman (2018) and The Suicide Squad. Visual effects were provided by Digital Domain, Rise FX, Rodeo FX, and Industrial Light & Magic (ILM). The film features a stop-motion sequence featuring the eponymous character from the Mexican television series El Chapulin Colorado (1973–1979), recreating the 1979 intro of the series; the sequence was animated at Achó Studios, with Quique Rivera serving as animation director on the sequence. The sequence was conceived by Soto and Dunnet-Alcocer, both of whom grew up watching the series and wanted to include an homage to it. McGuire emphasized the challenge of framing for both the standard 2.39:1 aspect ratio and the taller IMAX ratio, particularly in key action sequences like the bus scene. The team protected for IMAX in VFX-heavy scenes to allow flexibility in post-production. They used Panavision H Series lenses, chosen for their clarity and their ability to fill the frame.

One ongoing challenge was framing for the Scarab's back claws, which would be digitally inserted later. McGuire noted that they constantly had to account for the extra space the appendages would take up in the frame. The film features two long take ('oner') sequences. The first, a Steadicam oner at the swimming pool, follows Raoul Max Trujillo's character, Carapax, as he enters a military compound. The shot moves from him to Susan Sarandon's Victoria Kord, capturing generals walking away before spinning back to her for a key dialogue moment. The second oner, shot by Geoff Haley, was a handheld sequence inside the Reyes home, tracking multiple characters through a moment of exposition.

While much of the final battle used VFX for backgrounds, many sequences—including large-scale burns—were shot practically on location. McGuire noted the importance of keeping camera movements smooth for VFX-heavy shots, opting for remote heads instead of handheld work to give digital artists more stability in post-production. The Reyes' barrio scenes, in contrast, leaned on Steadicam and crane work for a mix of fluidity and controlled action.

=== Music ===
Bobby Krlic was confirmed to score the film by the trailer's release in April 2023. A soundtrack album featuring his score was released by WaterTower Music on August 18, 2023; a track from the soundtrack album, "Blue Beetle Suite", was released as a single on August 11.

== Marketing ==
Soto, Dunnet-Alcocer, and Maridueña promoted the film at the virtual DC FanDome event in October 2021, where they discussed their preparation for filming and revealed concept art. The first trailer for the film was released on April 3, 2023, revealing that the film takes place in Palmera City, an original location created for the film. It also showed a first look at the costumes of Dan Garrett and Ted Kord, the previous Blue Beetles before Jaime. The Verge's Ash Parrish thought that the trailer looked "fun" and stated: "I didn't immediately roll my eyes at yet another superhero flick, so that might be a good sign DC has something decent on its hands." Devan Coggan from Entertainment Weekly thought Lopez comparing Jaime's situation to Batman was an amusing moment, while noting the trailer had posited Jaime's character as being "an aimless college grad, who's close with his family but a bit directionless".

A second trailer was released on July 11, 2023, through Entertainment Tonight. Andy Behbakht, writing for Screen Rant, felt the trailer contained more action scenes than the first and focused on Jaime's relationship with the Scarab. For Empire, James White opined that the trailer's tone was a "blend" of other films such as Iron Man (2008), Spider-Man (2002), and Spy Kids (2001) and remarked that the trailer "promises action over angst". Griff Griffin from Men's Journal felt the CGI in the trailer was better, and described the suit as being an "insectoid version of Iron Man's nanotech" from Avengers: Infinity War (2018). However, Kat Bailey from IGN felt that while the trailer offered a "more straightforward look at Reyes' powers" and fan reception was positive, fans were also worried about the film's success due to the critical and commercial failure of DC's previous 2023 films. Warner Bros. partnered with Toyota to promote the film and the 2024 Toyota Tacoma pickup truck, which is featured in the film.

== Release ==
=== Theatrical ===
Blue Beetle premiered in El Paso, Texas on August 14, 2023, in partnership with the El Paso Times, and had its red carpet premiere at the TCL Chinese Theatre on August 15. Due to the then-ongoing 2023 SAG-AFTRA strike, the cast of the film did not attend the premiere, with Soto praising them as "heroes". Blue Beetle was theatrically released in the United States on August 18. In discussing the film's reception, McGuire pointed out the difficulties of releasing Blue Beetle in the wake of Oppenheimer and Barbie, two cultural juggernauts that dominated box office discussions. He acknowledged the impact of lingering COVID-19 concerns and high ticket prices, making audiences more selective about what they see in theaters. The shift away from second-run and discount theaters also meant fewer opportunities for discovery, a change he found unfortunate given the film's unique cultural resonance within the Latino community.

=== Home media ===
Blue Beetle was released on digital download on September 26, 2023, and on Ultra HD Blu-ray, Blu-ray, and DVD on October 31, by Warner Bros. Home Entertainment. The film debuted on the streaming service Max (formerly HBO Max) on November 17, 2023, as the most-streamed film on the platform in the United States during the first week of its release.

== Reception ==
=== Box office ===
Blue Beetle grossed $72.5 million in the United States and Canada, and $58.3 million in other territories, for a worldwide total of $130.8 million. It is the lowest-grossing film in the DCEU, behind Shazam! Fury of the Gods (2023), and underperformed at the box office.

In the United States and Canada, Blue Beetle was released alongside Strays, and was projected to gross $25–32 million from 3,871 theaters in its opening weekend. The film earned $10 million on its first day, including $3.3 million from Thursday night previews. It went on to debut to $25 million, topping the box office and becoming the first film to dethrone Barbie; 39% of the opening weekend audience was Hispanic, while 66% was male. The film's $43 million global opening was described by Variety as "one of the softest starts in the history of the DC Cinematic Universe", which was attributed to two concurrent strikes in Hollywood, and a tepid audience awaiting the arrival of Gunn and Safran's DCU slate. Warner Bros. cited the effects of Hurricane Hilary as a reason behind the poor domestic opening, given it affected Los Angeles which was one of the film's top markets. The film earned $12.2 million in its second weekend (a drop of 51%), finishing third behind newcomer Gran Turismo and Barbie. National Cinema Day, a day where movie theaters offer discounted tickets for moviegoers, was credited for boosting the film's Sunday numbers in its second weekend. It earned $7.1 million in its third weekend (and a total of $9.4 million during the four-day Labor Day weekend), remaining in third place.

=== Critical response ===
On the review aggregator website Rotten Tomatoes, 78% of 276 critics' reviews are positive, with an average rating of 6.4/10. The website's consensus reads: "Led by Xolo Maridueña's magnetic performance in the title role, Blue Beetle is a refreshingly family-focused superhero movie with plenty of humor and heart." On Metacritic, the film holds a weighted average score of 61 out of 100 from 52 critics, indicating "generally favorable" reviews. Audiences polled by CinemaScore gave the film an average grade of "B+" on an A+ to F scale, while PostTrak reported that moviegoers gave the film an 82% positive score, with 65% saying they would definitely recommend it.

Mark Kermode of The Guardian gave the film 4 out of 5 stars, writing, "Blue Beetle may be frontloaded with visual fireworks that neatly meld the practical and the virtual, but it is the likable interplay between its down-to-earth characters that gives the film oomph, making it more than just a Shazam-style romp." Odie Henderson of The Boston Globe gave the film 3 out of 4 stars, calling it "a watchable time-waster made better by the actors and the cinematography by Pawel Pogorzelski." The A.V. Club's Justin Lowe gave it a B− grade, writing, "the filmmakers and the SFX team have created a memorable visual style for the film, supported by a wide array of Latino talent that underpins the authenticity of the narrative and the visuals." The Independent's Clarisse Loughrey gave it 3 out of 5 stars, calling it "a likeable, if predictable, take on the superhero origin story that at no point invokes time travel, the multiverse, or a ginormous portal in the sky. And thank god for that."

Jake Wilson of The Age was more critical, writing, "Director Angel Manuel Soto and writer Gareth Dunnet-Alcocer do their best to weave a few additional progressive elements into this basically routine production, evidently aimed at younger viewers." He gave the film 2.5 out of 5 stars. Ed Potton of The Times gave it 2 out of 5 stars and wrote, "Blue Beetle is the latest product off the superhero production line and it's as tediously familiar as rail strikes and rainy Augusts. The only thing that differentiates this DC Comics adaptation from its scores of predecessors is the fact that its characters are mostly Latino-American." CNN Entertainment's Brian Lowry praised the casting and action sequences, but criticized the villain as "lousy". He concluded, "Blue Beetle might be able to soar into the stratosphere, but that feels like a hurdle the movie just doesn't clear."

=== Accolades ===
At the 51st Saturn Awards, Blue Beetle was nominated for Best Superhero Film and won for Best Younger Performer in a Film (Maridueña). Blue Beetle was nominated for the Emerging Technology Award at the 22nd Visual Effects Society Awards for the development of "Machine Learning Cloth".

== Future ==
=== Continuation in the DC Universe ===
In January 2023, Gunn said the film was "disconnected" from previous DCEU entries and could connect to the DCU. By April, the Blue Beetle character was reportedly part of Gunn and Safran's plans for the DCU. In June, Gunn said Blue Beetle would be the first DCU character while noting Superman (2025) is the first DCU film, while Safran soon clarified that Maridueña's Reyes would continue in the DCU but the film itself would stand on its own. Soto appreciated Gunn and Safran's embrace of the film and the character, and he said later that month that Blue Beetle was a part of the DCU and future plans for the franchise, but was not connected to all prior DCEU films. He explained that the film "lives in the world where superheroes exist. But that doesn't mean that a certain event, or certain alliance, or certain things from the past dictate where our film is going". He also expressed interest in the film being the first part of a trilogy. Soto added that Reyes's story from the film would remain canon for the DCU, and described the film as Reyes's "DCU prologue". In September, Gunn reiterated that Maridueña would continue to play Reyes in the DCU, but clarified that any DC media released before the first projects for the DCU in 2024 would not be canon to that franchise. Gunn added in August 2025 that the character would "fit in very nicely" within the DCU canon, but may necessitate a few retcons similar to how the series Peacemaker was incorporated into the DCU. Maridueña was revealed in July 2026 to be reprising his role in the Superman follow-up film Man of Tomorrow (2027), which reintroduces the character into the DCU. Gunn further reiterated in October that the Blue Beetle character was canon to the DCU, but would not confirm whether the film itself was.

=== Animated series ===
In June 2024, DC Studios and Warner Bros. Animation were revealed to be developing an animated television series focused on Blue Beetle for the DCU. It was expected to build off the film but tell its own story, and had the potential to lead to Maridueña starring in a DCU film if successful. Miguel Puga had been working on the series since early 2024 and was expected to serve as showrunner and director. Cristian Martinez was set as writer, with Soto, Dunnet-Alcocer, and Rickard all serving as executive producers. Galen Vaisman, an executive producer on the film, was overseeing the series for DC Studios. Contracts with the main cast were said to be "in flux", but DC Studios had received positive responses when asking the film's cast about returning to reprise their roles. Maridueña confirmed in July that he would reprise his role as Blue Beetle in the series, and said in February 2025 that the series was intended to debut in 2026. The series was intended to target a young audience, which Rosy Cordero of Deadline Hollywood noted made up much of the character's fanbase, but HBO Max announced in 2025 that it would de-prioritize children's programming in favor of adult and family programming. It was unclear whether the series would move forward as a result. The following month, Gunn reaffirmed that the series remained in development.
