= Blue Beetle (comic book) =

Comic book

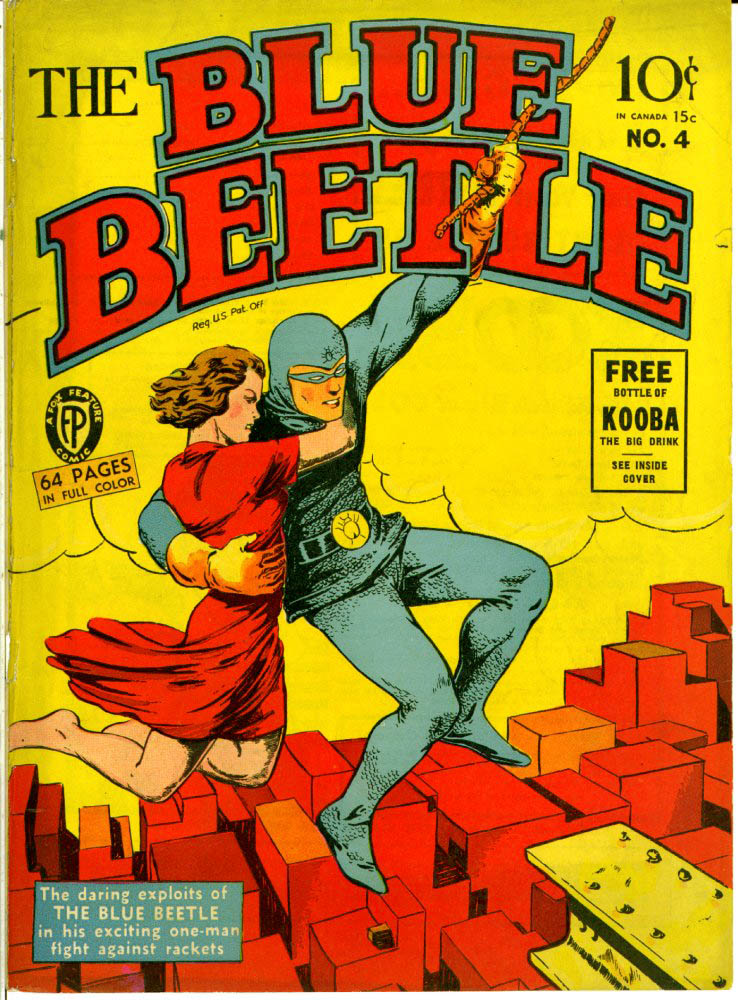
- Blue Beetle #4 (October 1940). Cover artist unknown, possibly Edd Ashe.

Publication information
- Publisher: Fox Feature Syndicate; Charlton Comics; DC Comics
- Schedule: Vol. 1: Bi-monthly #1–13, #41–44; Monthly #14–36, #45–60; Quarterly #37–40; Vols. 2, 3, 4: Bi-monthly; Vol. 5: Bi-monthly #1–4; Quarterly #5; Vols. 6, 7, 8, 9, 10: Monthly
- Format: All; Standard U.S., 4 color. When published, ongoing.
- Genre: Superhero
- Publication date: Vol. 1: January 1940 – August 1950; Vol. 2: February – August 1955; Vol. 3: June 1964 – March/April 1965; Vol. 4: July 1965 – February/March 1966; Vol. 5: June 1967 – November 1968; Vol. 6: June 1986 – May 1988; Vol. 7: May 2006 – February 2009; Vol. 8: September 2011 – January 2013; Vol. 9: September 2016 – February 2018; Vol. 10: September 2023 – July 2024
- No. of issues: Vol. 1: 59 (numbered 1–42; 44–60); Vol. 2: 4 (numbered 18–21); Vol. 3: 5 Vol. 4: 5 (numbered 50–54); Vol. 5: 5 Vol. 6: 24; Vol. 7: 36; Vol. 8: 17 (numbered 1–12; 0; 13–16); Vol. 9: 19 (Includes a DC Rebirth one-shot); Vol. 10: 8
- Main character(s): Vols. 1–4: Dan Garret; Vols. 5–6: Ted Kord; Vols. 7–10: Jaime Reyes

Blue Beetle is a long running comic book series featuring the superhero of the same name. Throughout its publication, the series has had three main characters who have each assumed the mantle of the Blue Beetle: Dan Garret, Ted Kord and Jaime Reyes. The series has been canceled and relaunched several times: its first volume was published by Fox Feature Syndicate and Holyoke Publishing, with subsequent volumes published by Charlton Comics and then DC Comics. Since 1986, the series and its characters have been integrated into the shared DC Universe.

== Fox Feature Syndicate and Holyoke Publishing ==
The first issue of the original Blue Beetle comic was published in January 1940 by Fox Feature Syndicate, written by Will Eisner with art by Charles Nicholas Wojtkoski (as Charles Nicholas). It starred the original Blue Beetle, Dan Garret, who had first appeared in Mystery Men Comics anthology comic book series: a rookie police officer, he wore a special bulletproof costume and took "Vitamin 2X" which endowed him with super-energy, and he was assisted by a neighborhood pharmacist in his fight against crime. The series was the second featured title of an individual superhero character in the American comic book market, after Superman.

Blue Beetle saw a number of anomalies in publication: issues #12 through #30 were published through Holyoke Publishing; no issue #43 was published; publication frequency varied throughout the run; and there were gaps where issues were not published, with large ones occurring in early 1947 and between mid-1948 and early 1950. The series lasted until August 1950 with issue #60, when the company of Fox Feature Syndicate collapsed.

== Charlton Comics ==
After purchasing the printing plates for various Blue Beetle stories from the defunct Fox Features Syndicate, Charlton Comics briefly launched its own Blue Beetle comic starring the same character, published bi-monthly from February to August 1955. This volume lasted four issues, numbered #18–21 (taking over numbering from Charlton's horror anthology series The Thing!): issues #18–19 consisted of reprinted stories from Fox Features Syndicate, while #20-21 also included original material. After the series was canceled, its issue numbering was taken over by Mr. Muscles.

In 1964, Charlton Comics relaunched Blue Beetle with a new volume, written by Joe Gill with art by Bill Fraccio and Tony Tallarico. Issue #1 (Jun. 1964) told a new origin story which substantially revised the main character and his superpowers: archaeology professor Dan Garrett (his surname now spelled differently) discovered an ancient mystical Egyptian scarab which gave him multiple superpowers. The series was published bi-monthly.

After five issues, the series underwent a soft relaunch with a new volume whose numbering began at #50 (Jul. 1965), taking over numbering from the anthology Unusual Tales. In all other aspects, including creative team, the series was unchanged from its previous volume. The series lasted for another five issues; its final issue, #54 (Feb.–Mar. 1966), was written by Roy Thomas. Its numbering was then taken over by the anthology series Ghostly Tales.

Ted Kord, the second Blue Beetle, was introduced via a backup feature in Captain Atom #83–86 (Nov. 1966 – Jun. 1967), in which he was shown to have become the Blue Beetle after Dan Garrett's apparent death. This was another substantial reinvention of the Blue Beetle as a superhero, as Kord had no superpowers and fought crime using advanced technology he had invented. A new volume of the Blue Beetle comic starring Kord began in June 1967, published bi-monthly. The backup features and ongoing series were plotted and illustrated by Steve Ditko; dialogue was credited to D.C. Glanzman. The superhero character The Question debuted as the star of a backup feature in Blue Beetle, also written and drawn by Ditko. Charlton Comics discontinued their entire "Action Heroes" line of comic books in 1968: thus the series was canceled after issue #5, a team-up story featuring the Blue Beetle and the Question, was published after some delay in November 1968. The story planned for a sixth issue was eventually printed, without coloring, in the fan publication Charlton Portfolio #1 in 1974.

Although the Blue Beetle volumes beginning in 1955, 1964, 1965 and 1967 are retroactively referred to as volumes 2, 3, 4 and 5 respectively, their indicia identifies them differently. The former three are identified respectively as Volumes 1, 2 and 3, while the latter is also identified as Volume 1.

== DC Comics ==
DC Comics acquired the rights to all Charlton Comics superhero characters in 1983. They began publication of a new volume of Blue Beetle in June 1986, starring Ted Kord, with the character now fully integrated into the newly rebooted DC Universe. All issues of this volume were written by Len Wein and illustrated by Paris Cullins. This volume lasted until issue #24 (May 1988). Although retroactively referred to as vol. 6, its indicia did not identify a volume number. Kord continued to appear as the Blue Beetle in other DC publications until his death in Countdown to Infinite Crisis (May 2005).

Jaime Reyes, the third Blue Beetle, was introduced in Infinite Crisis #3 (Feb. 2006): representing another major reinvention of the Blue Beetle as a superhero, Jaime Reyes was a teenager whose powers were derived from the scarab used by Dan Garrett, which was revealed as a piece of advanced alien technology. A new ongoing Blue Beetle series began publication in March 2006, initially written by Keith Giffen and John Rogers, with artist Cully Hamner. Giffen left in issue #10 and Rogers took over full writing duties, joined by a new artist, Rafael Albuquerque. Rogers left the title with issue #25 to concentrate on his television series Leverage. After three fill-in issues, Lilah Sturges became the main writer in issue #29, but the series was cancelled with issue #36. Editor Dan DiDio put the cancellation down to poor sales and said that Blue Beetle was "a book that we started with very high expectations, but it lost its audience along the way". The character went on to star in a backup feature in Booster Gold #21–25 (Aug. – Dec. 2009) and #28–29 (Mar. – Apr. 2010), also written by Sturges.

As part of The New 52 publishing initiative, which rebooted the continuity of the DC Universe, a new volume of Blue Beetle began in September 2011, written by Tony Bedard and drawn by Ig Guara. It began with a new origin story for Jaime Reyes as the Blue Beetle, which indicated there had been no other Blue Beetles before him in the new continuity. Running for seventeen issues altogether, including an issue #0 (Nov. 2012), the volume was canceled at issue #16 (Mar. 2013); Reyes's story continued in the new title Threshold.

DC Comics once again relaunched its titles with the DC Rebirth publishing initiative in 2016, which restored the history of Dan Garrett and Ted Kord as previous Blue Beetles. A new ongoing series was launched that year, with a one-shot special Blue Beetle: Rebirth (Oct. 2016) preceding Blue Beetle #1 (Nov. 2016). The series starred Jaime Reyes, while also featuring the resurrected Kord as an ex-superhero who acts as his mentor. The series ran until issue #18 (Apr. 2018).

Continuing on from the six-issue limited series Blue Beetle: Graduation Day (Jan.–Jun. 2023), a new ongoing Blue Beetle series was launched in September 2023 as a part of the Dawn of DC initiative. As with the preceding miniseries, the ongoing series is written by Josh Trujillo and illustrated by Adrián Gutiérrez, and starring Jaime Reyes.

== Collected editions ==
Vol. #	Title	Collected material	Pages	Year	ISBN
1	Shellshocked	Blue Beetle vol. 7, #1–6	144	December 27, 2006	978-1-4012-0965-0
2	Road Trip	Blue Beetle vol. 7, #7–12	144	June 6, 2007	978-1-4012-1361-9
3	Reach for the Stars	Blue Beetle vol. 7, #13–19	168	February 27, 2008	978-1-4012-1642-9
4	End Game	Blue Beetle vol. 7, #20–26	176	October 1, 2008	978-1-4012-1952-9
5	Boundaries	Blue Beetle vol. 7, #29–34	144	April 22, 2009	978-1-4012-2162-1
6	Black and Blue	Blue Beetle vol. 7, #27–28, #35–36; Booster Gold vol. 2, #21–25, #28–29	168	December 28, 2010	978-1-4012-2897-2
The New 52
1	Metamorphosis	Blue Beetle vol. 8, #1–6	144	November 20, 2012	978-1401237134
2	Blue Diamond	Blue Beetle vol. 8, #0, 7–16; Green Lantern: New Guardians #9	240	April 30, 2013	978-1401238506
DC Rebirth
1	The More Things Change	Blue Beetle: Rebirth #1; Blue Beetle vol. 9 #1–5	144	May 16, 2017	978-1401268688
2	Hard Choices	Blue Beetle vol. 9 #6–12	168	January 2, 2018	978-1401275075
3	Road to Nowhere	Blue Beetle vol. 9 #13–18	144	July 17, 2018	978-1401280833
Dawn of DC
1	Graduation Day	Blue Beetle: Graduation Day #1–6	144	August 2, 2023	978-1779523242
2	Scarab War	Blue Beetle vol. 10 #1–6	136	August 14, 2024	978-1779527059
3	Forever Blue	Blue Beetle vol. 10 #7–11	136	January 15, 2025	978-1779528599
