= Blue Beetle =

Name of multiple DC Comics superheroes

- Dan Garrett, Ted Kord, and Jaime Reyes in interior artwork from the Blue Beetle Companion. Art by Tom Feister.
- Publisher: Fox Comics; Holyoke Publishing; Charlton Comics; DC Comics
- First appearance: Mystery Men Comics #1 (August 1939)
- Created by: Charles Wojtkoski
- Characters: Dan Garrett; Ted Kord; Jaime Reyes

Blue Beetle is the name of three superheroes appearing in a number of American comic books published by a variety of companies since 1939. The most recent of the companies to own rights to Blue Beetle is DC Comics, which bought the rights to the character from Charlton Comics in 1983, using the name for three distinct characters over the years.

The original Blue Beetle was created by Charles Nicholas Wojtkoski and Fox Comics and later owned by Charlton Comics. The first Beetle was Dan Garret (later spelled Dan Garrett), who initially gained superpowers from a special vitamin, which was later changed to gaining powers from a "sacred scarab". The original Blue Beetle was featured in not only his own comic but also a weekly radio serial.

The second Blue Beetle, created by Charlton and later taken over by DC Comics, was the successor to Dan Garrett known as Ted Kord. Kord "jumped" to the DC Comics universe during the Crisis on Infinite Earths alongside a number of other Charlton Comics characters. The second Blue Beetle later starred in his own 24-issue comic. Kord never had any super powers but used science to create various devices to help him fight crime. He became a member of the Justice League of America and was later killed during the prelude to DC Comics' 2005 Infinite Crisis cross over.

The third Blue Beetle, created by DC Comics, is Jaime Reyes, a teenager who discovers that the original Blue Beetle scarab morphs into a battle suit allowing him to fight crime and travel in space. Over the years, Reyes became a member of the Teen Titans and starred in two Blue Beetle comic series. In DC Comics' 2011 "The New 52" reboot, Jaime Reyes was the primary Blue Beetle character, only occasionally referring to past versions. With the subsequent continuity revision "DC Rebirth" in 2016, the previous versions were restored.

The characters have appeared in a variety of other media. The Jaime Reyes incarnation appears in the 2023 DC Extended Universe film Blue Beetle, portrayed by Xolo Maridueña.

== Publication history ==
The original Blue Beetle, Dan Garret, first appeared in Fox Comics' Mystery Men Comics #1 (cover-dated August 1939), with art by Charles Nicholas Wojtkoski (as under the house name of Charles Nicholas), though the Grand Comics Database tentatively credits Will Eisner as the scripter. A rookie police officer, he wore a special bulletproof costume and took "Vitamin 2X" which endowed him with super-energy, and he was assisted by a neighborhood pharmacist in his fight against crime. Blue Beetle starred in a comic book series, comic strip and radio serial, but like most Golden Age superheroes, he fell into obscurity in the 1950s. The comic book series saw a number of anomalies in publication: 19 issues, #12 through #30, were published through Holyoke Publishing; no issue #43 was published; publication frequency varied throughout the run; and there were gaps where issues were not published, with large ones occurring in early 1947 and between mid-1948 and early 1950.

In the mid-1950s, Fox Comics went out of business and sold the printing plates for some stories featuring the Blue Beetle to Charlton Comics. Reprinted stories from the original Blue Beetle series were initially published in Charlton's anthology comic Space Adventures #13-14 (Oct. 1954, Jan. 1955). Charlton Comics then began publishing their own Blue Beetle series, taking over numbering from the horror anthology series The Thing!, beginning with issue #18 (Feb. 1955). Issues #18-19 consisted entirely of reprinted Fox Comics stories; #20-21 included new adventures of the Golden Age character. The series was cancelled after these four issues, with numbering taken over from #22 onwards by Mr. Muscles. One more original story starring the Golden Age incarnation of the character was published as a backup feature in Nature Boy #3 (Mar. 1956).

In 1964, Charlton Comics began publishing a new series of Blue Beetle which substantially revamped the hero, reinventing him as a university professor and altering the spelling of his name to Dan Garrett. The first issue (Jun. 1964) was a new origin story that depicted Dan Garrett coming into possession of a mystical Egyptian scarab that granted him superpowers and beginning his career as the Blue Beetle. After five issues were published, the next issue was numbered as #50 (Jul. 1965), taking over numbering from the anthology comic Unusual Tales. The series ended with issue #54 (Feb.-Mar. 1966), its numbering taken over afterwards by the anthology comic Ghostly Tales. Issues #1-5 and #50-53 were written by Joe Gill and issue #54 by Roy Thomas; art for all ten issues was by Bill Fraccio and Tony Tallarico.

Later in 1966, Blue Beetle was reinvented again in a set of backup stories published in Captain Atom #83 (Nov. 1966) through #86, plotted and drawn by Steve Ditko: they introduced Ted Kord, a student of Dan Garrett's, who took on the role of Blue Beetle following Garrett's apparent death. Kord was an inventor hero, using a variety of gadgets, with a day job of running his own research lab. This Beetle received his own series in 1967, also by Ditko, which ran for five issues until the entire Charlton "Action Heroes" line of comic books ceased publication in 1968. The story planned for a sixth issue was eventually printed, without coloring, in the fan publication Charlton Portfolio #1 in 1974.

Both Blue Beetles reappeared in the third issue of Americomics, a title published by AC Comics in 1983–84. In the first story in this issue, Ted Kord fought a bogus Dan Garrett, but the second story was more significant. It revealed that the original 1940s Dan was reincarnated as the Silver Age version (minus his memories of his earlier existence) by some unspecified "gods", presumably the ones responsible for his mystic scarab. The gods subsequently resurrected Dan again and sent him off to save Kord's life (leaving him a note saying simply, "Try not to get killed this time"). After this adventure, Kord turned the Blue Beetle name back over to Dan. Americomics was canceled after issue #6, and so far this story has never been referenced by any other publisher.

With the rest of the Charlton Comics superhero line-up, Blue Beetle was sold to DC Comics in 1983. A new Blue Beetle series starring Ted Kord began publication in 1986, following Crisis on Infinite Earths, integrating the hero into the DC Comics shared universe. The series ran for 24 issues (Jun. 1986-May 1988), all written by Len Wein. While the series largely carried over the status quo and characters from Charlton Comics, some new elements were introduced: most notably, Kord was made a billionaire industrialist as his research lab was reinvented as the massively successful R & D company Kord Industries.

Blue Beetle became a member of the Justice League upon the launch of a new series in 1987, beginning with Justice League #1 (May 1987). Depicted with a more comedic tone than in the Blue Beetle solo comic, Ted Kord became best friends with team-mate Booster Gold. Blue Beetle remained as a main character on the series as it was re-titled Justice League International and then Justice League America. Following the event miniseries Zero Hour, both Blue Beetle and Booster Gold left the series and began starring in the new team title Extreme Justice, which ran for issues #0-18 (Jan. 1995-Jul. 1996). Kord later became a recurring character in Birds of Prey, and starred in the 2003-04 miniseries Formerly Known as the Justice League. Kord was killed off in the one-shot comic Countdown to Infinite Crisis (May 2005).

In 2006, DC introduced a new Blue Beetle, teenager Jaime Reyes, whose powers are derived from the scarab, now revealed as a piece of advanced alien technology. A new ongoing Blue Beetle series began publication in March 2006, initially written by Keith Giffen and John Rogers, with artist Cully Hamner. Giffen left in issue #10 and Rogers took over full writing duties, joined by a new artist, Rafael Albuquerque. Rogers left the title with issue #25 to concentrate on his television series Leverage. After three fill-in issues, Lilah Sturges became the main writer in issue #29, but the series was cancelled with issue #36. Editor Dan DiDio put the cancellation down to poor sales and said that Blue Beetle was "a book that we started with very high expectations, but it lost its audience along the way".

Following the cancellation of Jaime Reyes' solo series, the character was brought back to star in a backup feature in Booster Gold, once again written by Sturges. The backup feature ran through issues #21-25 (Aug.-Dec. 2009) and #28-29 (Mar.-Apr. 2010).

A new Blue Beetle comic was launched as part of The New 52 initiative in September 2011, with Jaime Reyes' history being rebooted with a new origin and without any apparent history of Kord or Garrett as prior Blue Beetles. The new book was written by Tony Bedard and drawn by Ig Guara. Blue Beetle was cancelled after issue #16 (Mar. 2013); Jaime Reyes's story was then continued in the new title Threshold, written by Keith Giffen, which ultimately ran for eight issues (Mar.-Oct. 2013).

The 2016 publishing initiative DC Rebirth restored the history of Dan Garrett and Ted Kord as previous Blue Beetles. A new Blue Beetle series was launched that year, with a one-shot special Blue Beetle: Rebirth (Oct. 2016) preceding Blue Beetle #1 vol. 9 (Nov. 2016), once again written by Keith Giffen. The series starred Jaime Reyes, while also featuring Kord as an ex-superhero who acts as his mentor. The series ran until issue #18 (Apr. 2018). Kord then co-starred alongside Booster Gold in the 2021-22 limited series Blue & Gold by Dan Jurgens, once again operating as a superhero under the name Blue Beetle.

Jaime Reyes remains the primary Blue Beetle for DC Comics. The 2022-23 limited series Blue Beetle: Graduation Day, written by Josh Trujillo and illustrated by Adrián Gutiérrez, featured Jaime Reyes as the main character. This was followed by a new ongoing Blue Beetle series by the same creative team, beginning in September 2023.

== Characters ==
=== Dan Garret / Dan Garrett ===
The original Golden Age Blue Beetle is Dan Garret, son of a police officer killed by a criminal. This Fox Feature Syndicate version of the character debuted in Mystery Men Comics #1 (August 1939), and began appearing in his own 60-issue series shortly thereafter. Fox Feature Syndicate sponsored a "Blue Beetle Day" at the 1939 New York World's Fair on August 7, 1940, beginning at 10:30 a.m. and including 300 children in relay-race finals at the Field of Special Events, following preliminaries in New York City parks. The race was broadcast over radio station WMCA.

Charlton Comics reprinted some stories in its anthology titles and in a four-issue Blue Beetle reprint series numbered 18–21, although there is no evidence that they obtained the rights to the character - just that they purchased the printing plates to earlier stories.

In 1964, during the Silver Age of comics, Charlton revised the character for a new Blue Beetle series. Charlton's new Blue Beetle retained the original's name (adding a second "t"), but none of his powers or origin, making him a different character. This Beetle was archaeologist Dan Garrett, who obtained a number of superhuman powers (including super strength and vision, flight, and the ability to generate energy blasts) from a mystical scarab he found during a dig in Egypt, where it had been used to imprison an evil mummified Pharaoh. He would transform into the Blue Beetle by saying the words "Kaji Dha!". This version, by writer Joe Gill and artist Tony Tallarico, was played at least initially for camp, with stories like "The Giant Mummy Who was Not Dead". The Charlton Dan Garrett version of the Blue Beetle ran only until 1966 before his replacement debuted.

The Charlton version of Dan Garrett was spotlighted in the second issue of DC's 1980s Secret Origins series, in which his origin was retold along with that of Ted Kord. Subsequent appearances by Dan Garrett (in flashback stories) include guest spots or cameos in Infinity, Inc., Captain Atom, JLA: Year One, and Legends of the DC Universe.

The character briefly returned in DC Comics' first run of Blue Beetle, resurrected by his mystical scarab to battle against his successor. He can also be seen in various flashback stories. His 1940s incarnation is briefly glimpsed in DC's 1993 limited series The Golden Age.

In issue #0 of the miniseries Project Superpowers, the Fox Feature Syndicate version of the Blue Beetle appeared in flashbacks (as by now the character/spelling "Dan Garret" was in the public domain). To avoid trademark conflicts with DC Comics, he is referred to by the nickname "Big Blue".

=== Ted Kord ===
The replacement Blue Beetle created by Charlton Comics, and later published by Americomics and DC Comics, is Ted Kord, a former student of Dan Garrett, a genius-level inventor and a gifted athlete. Kord and Garrett were investigating Kord's uncle Jarvis when they learned Jarvis was working to create an army of androids to take over Earth. Garrett changed into Blue Beetle, but was killed in battle. As he died, he passed on to Kord the responsibility of being Blue Beetle, but was unable to pass on the mystical scarab. Kord held the scarab for some time, but never used it.

In the series Countdown to Infinite Crisis, Blue Beetle discovers a renewed Checkmate organization led by Maxwell Lord, with a database containing information on every metahuman on Earth. He is captured by Lord and executed with a single gunshot to the head. Blue Beetle was resurrected following The New 52 continuity reboot.

=== Jaime Reyes ===
Jaime Reyes is a teenager who lives in El Paso, Texas, with his father, mother, and little sister; his father owns a garage and his mother is a nurse. Jaime has offered to help his father out at the garage, but his father has turned him down. He feels Jaime should enjoy his childhood for as long as he can, and should attempt to further his education. He finds the scarab in a vacant lot and it fuses with him while he sleeps. After Booster Gold revealed Jaime's new powers to him, Jaime was swept up in the climactic battle with Brother Eye during Infinite Crisis. He later becomes a member of the Teen Titans, and is good friends with Rose Wilson (Ravager), Static, and others. In Teen Titans (vol. 3) #83, he takes a break from the team to be with his mother.

Jaime has a girlfriend, the young sorceress Traci Thirteen, who gets along well with Jaime's family. His large and loving family is a major source of strength and guidance for Jaime. Christopher Smith / Peacemaker also became a mentor for the young Blue Beetle.

Jaime co-starred along with the rest of the former Justice League International in Justice League: Generation Lost.

Following DC's "Flashpoint" storyline Blue Beetle was one of 52 monthly titles launched in September 2011, again starring Jaime Reyes. The series was cancelled after 17 issues in January 2013.

== The Scarab – Khaji Da ==
The Blue Beetle scarab, previously shown as an artifact of magic, is later retconned as a tool of war of the Reach, an ancient race of cosmic marauders. After being defeated by the Guardians of the Universe thousands of years ago and forced into a truce, the Reach poses as benevolent aliens lending their advanced technology to budding civilizations. The scarab is a gift for that world's champion, giving him amazing powers and the knowledge of the Reach to protect their peers. Secretly, the scarab is part of an advanced hive mind, with its own artificial intelligence covertly supplanting the wearer's own. The wearer is turned into the "ultimate infiltrator", a covert agent intended to take over its own world. However, the Blue Beetle Scarab is damaged and so instead of it controlling the host, it forms a symbiotic relationship with them.

The Blue Beetle scarab uses its serial number, Khaji Da, as its name.

In the New 52, the Reach forgoes the secrecy, and each wearer immediately becomes possessed by the scarab. It then uses its host's knowledge to decimate the world and prepare it for a full invasion by Reach forces.

In DC Universe: Rebirth, Ted Kord and Jaime Reyes believe the scarab is an alien device that bonded to Jaime's spine. Kord is fascinated by this scarab and wants to investigate its potential, while Jaime fears it. When Jaime leaves Kord's lab to get to school, Doctor Fate appears in the lab to warn Kord that the scarab is not an alien device, but it is instead magic. This further sparks Kord's interest in the potential of the scarab.

== Supporting cast ==
The Blue Beetle has many friends and family throughout his series, such as Mike Manniguen, Sparky, and Luri Hoshid. Ted Kord's supporting cast includes Tracy, Melody Case, Jeremiah Duncan, Angela Revere, Murray Takamoto, Booster Gold, and Lt. Sam Fisher. Jaime Reyes' supporting cast includes Paco, Brenda Del Vecchio, Traci Thirteen, Yellow Beetle, the Reyes family, and Green Beetle.

== Enemies ==
The Blue Beetle faces many enemies throughout his storylines, beginning with the White Face Gang in Mystery Men #1 (August 1939). As Ted Kord, he later faces several notable enemies, including Doctor Alchemy (Showcase #13), Chronos (The Atom #3), Jarvis Kord (Blue Beetle vol. 5 #2), Enigma (Charlton Bullseye vol. 2 #1), Carapax (Blue Beetle vol. 6 #1), Hybrid (New Teen Titans vol. 2 #24), Maxwell Lord (Justice League #1), and Overthrow (Blue Beetle vol. 6 #15). Jaime Reyes took on La Dama as an archenemy, beginning in Blue Beetle vol. 7 #3.

== Other versions ==
Several alternate universe versions of the Blue Beetle appear in Countdown: Arena, such as the Scarab of Earth-26, a swarm of sentient insects that form a humanoid body.

A possible apocalyptic future incarnation of the Blue Beetle called the Blue Scarab appears in Justice League: Generation Lost. He is stated to be the "descendant of the Blue Beetle" and sports an alien appearance.

== In other media ==
=== Television ===
- The Jaime Reyes incarnation of the Blue Beetle and Ted Kord appear in the Smallville episode "Booster", portrayed by Jaren Brandt Bartlett and Sebastian Spence respectively.
- The Jaime Reyes, Ted Kord, and Dan Garrett incarnations of the Blue Beetle appear in Batman: The Brave and the Bold, with Reyes and Kord voiced by Will Friedle and Wil Wheaton respectively while Garrett is silent.
- In 2010, Geoff Johns announced a live-action TV series featuring the Jaime Reyes incarnation of the Blue Beetle, with Garrett Plotkin in the title role. However, no further announcements were made.
- The Jaime Reyes, Ted Kord, and Dan Garrett incarnations of the Blue Beetle appear in Young Justice, with Reyes and Khaji Da voiced by Eric Lopez while Kord and Garrett are silent.
- The Jaime Reyes incarnation of the Blue Beetle appears in Justice League Action, voiced again by Jake T. Austin.
- The Ted Kord incarnation of the Blue Beetle appears in the second season of Teen Titans Go!, voiced by Jess Harnell.
- The Ted Kord incarnation of the Blue Beetle appears in the second season of DC Super Hero Girls (2019), voiced by Max Mittelman.

=== Film ===
- The Dan Garrett incarnation of the Blue Beetle appears on the cover of a comic book in Under the Hood, a fictional documentary released as a tie-in to the film Watchmen.
- An unidentified alternate universe version of the Blue Beetle appears in Justice League: Crisis on Two Earths as a minor member of the Crime Syndicate.
- The Jaime Reyes incarnation of the Blue Beetle appears in the DC Animated Movie Universe (DCAMU) Justice League vs. Teen Titans, voiced by Jake T. Austin.
- The Jaime Reyes incarnation of the Blue Beetle appears in the DCAMU Teen Titans: The Judas Contract, voiced again by Jake T. Austin.
- The Ted Kord incarnation of the Blue Beetle makes a cameo appearance in Teen Titans Go! To the Movies.
- The Jaime Reyes incarnation of the Blue Beetle appears in the DCAMU Justice League Dark: Apokolips War.
- The Ted Kord incarnation of the Blue Beetle appears in DC Showcase: Blue Beetle, voiced by Matt Lanter.
- The Ted Kord incarnation of the Blue Beetle appears in Teen Titans Go! & DC Super Hero Girls: Mayhem in the Multiverse, voiced again by an uncredited Max Mittelman.
- The Jaime Reyes incarnation of the Blue Beetle appears in the DC Extended Universe film Blue Beetle, with Reyes portrayed by Xolo Maridueña and Khaji Da voiced by Becky G.
- The Ted Kord incarnation of Blue Beetle appears in Justice League: Crisis on Infinite Earths, voiced again by Matt Lanter.
- The Jaime Reyes incarnation of the Blue Beetle appears in the DC Universe film Man of Tomorrow, portrayed again by Xolo Maridueña.

=== Video games ===
- The Jaime Reyes incarnation of the Blue Beetle appears as a playable character in Infinite Crisis.
- The Dan Garrett, Ted Kord, and Jaime Reyes incarnations of the Blue Beetle appear as character summons in Scribblenauts Unmasked: A DC Comics Adventure.
- The Jaime Reyes incarnation of the Blue Beetle appears as a playable character in Lego Batman 3: Beyond Gotham.
- The Jaime Reyes incarnation of the Blue Beetle appears as a playable character in Lego DC Super-Villains.
- The Jaime Reyes incarnation of the Blue Beetle appears as a playable character in Injustice 2.
- The Jaime Reyes Incarnation of the Blue Beetle appears as a playable character in Teen Titans Go Figure!.

=== Miscellaneous ===
- The Dan Garrett incarnation of the Blue Beetle appears in a self-titled radio serial, voiced by Frank Lovejoy in the first 13 episodes and an uncredited actor in subsequent episodes.
- The Dan Garrett incarnation of the Blue Beetle appears in a short-lived comic strip, drawn by Jack Kirby, among others, under pseudonyms.
- Ted Kord appears in the Kingdom Come audio drama, by John Whitman.
- The Ted Kord incarnation of the Blue Beetle appears in Justice League Unlimited tie-in comics.
- The Jaime Reyes incarnation of the Blue Beetle makes non-speaking background appearances in DC Super Hero Girls (2015).
- The Jaime Reyes and Ted Kord incarnations of the Blue Beetle appear in the Injustice 2 prequel comic.

== Homages ==
- Roy Thomas wrote the Blue Beetle in one of his earliest professional credits and later created Blue Beetle pastiches the Scarlet Scarab for Marvel Comics and the Silver Scarab for DC Comics.
- Alan Moore used the Dan Garret and Ted Kord incarnations of the Blue Beetle as inspiration for the two Nite Owls in his comic book series Watchmen.
