= Edmond Good =

Canadian illustrator, writer and co-author

Edmond Elbridge Good (July 1, 1910 – September 22, 1991) was a Canadian illustrator, writer and co-author of more than a dozen comics during the Golden Age of Comic Books.

== Biography ==
=== Early life ===
Born in Saco, Maine, Good's parents were both Canadian and returned to their home town of Hamilton Ontario when Edmond was 10. Ed showed a keen interest in art at an early age, and excelled at drawing in high school. After graduation Good's father, a seasonal fisherman, insisted his son continue his education and paid for his tuition at the Hamilton school of art and design. Upon graduation Edmond went to work as a commercial illustrator before making his debut in comics for Bell Features, a comic strip syndicate owned by Cy Bell in 1941. His only marriage was to Audrey Harrison whom he wed in June 1936, the couple had two children together Aledra and Barton.

=== Comic industry ===
After shadowing artists on various titles at Bell Features, Cy Bell impressed with Ed's work ethic and natural affinity toward color theory and good design, promoted Good to Art Director. A year later in 1942, the comic industry continued to suffer through anemic sales on traditional titles and Bell hired Adrian Dingle (Triumph Comics, No. 7 May/June 1942) to replace Good as director.

One of Good's earliest contributions to the ten cent cover was a male character he helped develop named Rex Baxter; the series was one of the longest running of the Canadian Sign/Bell Features titles. During this time Good simultaneously moonlighted for various publishers, mainly pulp fiction titles such as Thrilling Detective Stories. Other notable titles Good either co-authored or created under Bell were Dagar Desert Hawk, Sky Ranger, Ghost Breaker and Magnet.

Near the end of 1943, Edmond relocated to upstate New York, settling in at a position for Adventure Comics and as a splash page/cover artist for Thrilling Comics in what would be considered his most notable role as a professional artist for the AP Newsfeatures stripScorchy Smith.

In 1955 Good left his position at AP Features to start his own comic agency Good Comics which produced Johnny Law and Sky Ranger, both of which were met with poor commercial success.

Jerry Bails Who's Who In Comics listed Good as Art director of Tupperware Incorporated until his retirement in 1974, he was known to frequent Comic Cons in the East U.S. well into his late seventies.

== Published works ==
Year/s	Title	Frequency	Materials	Publisher	Notes	Ref
1949	Bruce Gentry – Daredevil of the Skies	Daily	Ghost pen and ink			
1953–1954	Casey Ruggles	Sundays	Ghost pen and ink	United Feature Syndicate		
1944	Manhunter (DC)		Pen	DC Comics		
1944	Mike Gibbs, Guerilla		Pen and ink	DC Comics		
1944–1950	Scorchy Smith	Daily	WR, pen, and ink	Associated Press		
1947–?	Tomahawk (DC)		Pen and ink	DC Comics	First artist	
1948–1949	Dagar, the Desert Hawk		WR, pen, and ink	Fox Feature Syndicate		
1948–1949	Rulah, Jungle Goddess		WR, pen, and ink	Fox Feature Syndicate		
1949–1951	Monte Hale		Pen and ink	Fawcett Comics		
1955	Buzzy Bean		WR	Good Comics		
1955	Covers		Pen and ink	Good Comics		
1955	Filler		WR, pen, and ink	Good Comics		
1955	Johnny Law		WR, pen, and ink	Good Comics		
1955	Sky Ranger		WR, pen, and ink	Good Comics		
1955	Support			Good Comics	Publisher, editor	
1955	Text		WR	Good Comics		
1953	Love Confessions		Pen and ink	Marvel Comics		
1953	Two-Gun Lil		Pen and ink	Quality Comics		
1954	Mystery/Occult		Pen and ink	Marvel Comics		
1954	Love Secrets		Pen	Quality Comics		
1953, 1955–1956	T-Man		Pen and ink	Quality Comics		
Unknown	Dixie Dugan	Daily	Ghost pen and ink	McNaught Syndicate		
Unknown	Red Ryder	Daily	Asst pen and ink	NEA		
