= Blue Beetle (Jaime Reyes) =

Comic book superhero

Jaime Reyes Blue Beetle
- Portion of the variant cover art of Infinite Crisis #5 (April 2006). Art by Jim Lee.

Publication information
- Publisher: DC Comics
- First appearance: As Jaime Reyes: Infinite Crisis #3 (February 2006); As Blue Beetle: Infinite Crisis #5 (April 2006)
- Created by: Keith Giffen; John Rogers; Cully Hamner

In-story information
- Full name: Jaime Reyes
- Species: Human
- Place of origin: El Paso, Texas
- Team affiliations: Justice League; Kord Industries; Justice League International; Teen Titans; Young Justice; Secret Six
- Partnerships: Traci Thirteen; Peacemaker; Starfire; Blue Beetle (Ted Kord); Manhunter (Kate Spencer)
- Notable aliases: Blue Beetle, Scarab
- Abilities: See list: Scarab armored suit grants: Flight; Superhuman strength and durability; Melee weapon production; Translation of alien languages; Energy pulse shield projection; Ability to create and unleash powerful hand blasts/beams; Sound manipulation; Technomorphy; Pyrokinesis & Mechanokinesis; Mind link with the Scarab due to his bond with Khaji Da

Jaime Reyes is a superhero appearing in American comic books published by DC Comics. Created by Keith Giffen, John Rogers, and Cully Hamner, the character made his first appearance in Infinite Crisis #3 (February 2006). While being the third character to assume the Blue Beetle codename, the character is substantially different from his predecessors, being of Mexican-American origin and empowered through a sentient, armored suit of alien origin.

Beginning as a high-school teenager from El Paso, Jaime would find himself bonded with an ancient scarab embedded into his spine, being the same one once discovered and used by Dan Garret. With the scarab having both magical and extraterrestrial connections from ancient Egypt and being technology derived from aliens known as the Reach respectively, Jaime would embark on the life of a superhero, often guided and mentored by his predecessor, Ted Kord. In more recent publications, the character has also evolved into a college-aged student. Blue Beetle often appears most notably as a member of the Teen Titans but has served in various Justice League-derivative teams.

Blue Beetle has appeared in various media outside comics. Will Friedle, Eric Lopez, Jake T. Austin, and others have voiced the character in animated television series and films. Jaren Brandt Bartlett portrayed the character in a 2011 episode of the television series Smallville, and Xolo Maridueña portrayed the character in the 2023 live-action film Blue Beetle, set in the DC Extended Universe, and will continue to play the character in the rebooted DC Universe (DCU) franchise, beginning with the film Man of Tomorrow (2027).

== Publication history ==
Jaime Reyes debuted as Blue Beetle in Infinite Crisis #5 (March 2006). His own monthly series debuted two months later with Blue Beetle vol. 7 #1 (May 2006); it was initially written by Keith Giffen and John Rogers, with artist Cully Hamner. Giffen left before issue #10 and Rogers took over full writing duties, joined by artist Rafael Albuquerque. Rogers left in issue #25 to concentrate on his television series Leverage.

After a couple of fill-in issues, Lilah Sturges became the main writer in issue #29. The series was canceled with issue #36 in February 2009. Editor Dan DiDio attributed the cancellation to poor sales and said that Blue Beetle was "a book that we started with very high expectations, but it lost its audience along the way".

The character returned in June 2009 as a "co-feature" of the more popular Booster Gold comic.

== Fictional character biography ==
Jaime lives in El Paso, Texas, and is the son of Alberto Reyes and Bianca Reyes and the brother of Milagro Reyes. Jaime has an acute sense of responsibility for his immediate family and friends Paco and Brenda Del Vecchio, though he complains about having to sort out their problems. He derives strength and courage from his family's support, wanting what is best for them.

The mystical scarab that had given Dan Garrett his powers had been thought destroyed. When it was found intact, it was given to Ted Kord, who was never able to use it. After an attack by Brother Eye, the scarab appeared energized and Ted brought it to the wizard Shazam, who took it and sent Ted away. Shortly after, in the Day of Vengeance storyline, Shazam is killed and the scarab is blasted across Earth.

The scarab arrives in El Paso, Texas, where it is found by Jaime. Not long after, Booster Gold appears at Jaime's house to retrieve the scarab, but it has fused itself to Jaime's spine. Booster recruits Jaime for Batman's assault on Brother Eye. Once Brother Eye is sent plummeting towards Earth, Jaime is teleported away by the scarab.

=== Ongoing series ===
Jaime is next seen in the solo series Blue Beetle, where he fights off Green Lantern Guy Gardner after Guy is driven to rage by his ring's reaction to the scarab. A flashback expands on Jaime's discovery of the scarab, revealing how the scarab bonded itself to Jaime and showing his first encounter with a metahuman. After his fight with Guy, Jaime finds himself alone and naked in the desert and has to hitchhike home. Upon his return, Jaime discovers that he had been missing for one year because the scarab used a dimensional mode of transport to return to Earth. Unlike most superheroes, Jaime shared his identity with family and friends.

The scarab is revealed to be an extraterrestrial weapon that was created by the alien Reach, but was magically freed from their control by the first humans it encountered. Guy Gardner returns and reveals how the Reach and the Green Lantern Corps had battled in the past, forcing the Reach into a truce. The Reach continued pursuing their invasion plans, offering the scarab as a "protector" and then forcibly turning its host into their vanguard. As the scarab reforms and works with Jaime, the Reach changes their agenda into feigning friendship with Jaime and Earth, attacking him in a more subversive manner.

Jaime takes the fight to the Reach, using the time-warping qualities of the Bleed to attack three of their machines at once. When this fails, Jaime attacks the Reach's flagship, but the Reach use their weapons to attack his home. Jaime's emotional outburst at this attack allows the Reach to shut down the scarab and remove it from Jaime, who is thrown into a holding cell. However, the scarab transfers its knowledge into Jaime before removal, allowing him to escape. Jaime's family, having escaped the attack, are protected from further Reach assault by Peacemaker, the Posse, Traci Thirteen, La Dama, Guy Gardner, Fire, and Ice. Attacking several guards and taking their armor, Jaime heads for the engine, forcing the Reach to shut it down and reveal their ship. Jaime reveals that, during the time spent with him, the scarab has gained a personality of its own and fully detached itself from the Reach hive mind. Naming itself Khaji Da, the scarab sides with Jaime against the Reach. As the battle continues, the Reach negotiator unleashes a doomsday device on Earth in retaliation for his defeat. Jaime and the scarab agree to sacrifice themselves to stop the superweapon. At the last moment, Booster Gold appears and saves them both.

=== Teen Titans ===
Jaime first teams up with the Teen Titans when they battle Lobo, who the Reach hired to maintain their facade as benevolent protectors. Although criticizing Jaime for his lack of formal training, the Titans extend an invitation to visit and perhaps join the team. During the "Titans of Tomorrow, Today!" arc, Jaime takes the Titans up on their offer to visit, only to find that an alternate future version of the Titans have captured several members of the Justice League. He later proves instrumental in the younger Titans' victory against their future selves.

Jaime is recruited by Black Beetle (who originally identifies himself as a Blue Beetle from the future) and Dan Garrett to go into the past with Booster Gold to prevent Ted Kord's death. After saving Kord, Jaime and Garrett return, and the future is revealed to be a dystopia ruled by Maxwell Lord, who was never exposed and defeated. Seeing the damage done by their actions, Kord decides to accept his death and returns to the past, restoring the timeline.

Jaime comes into conflict with Kid Devil, who still harbored a grudge against him because of both the future Titans incident and his status with Ravager. Jaime tries to mend fences with Kid Devil, but their squabbling allows Shockwave to escape. After working with Jaime to defeat Shockwave, Kid Devil realizes that he is being sincere. The two reconcile and reveal their secret identities to each other. Later, at Titans Tower, Robin offers Jaime full membership, which he finally feels ready to accept.

=== Series finale ===
A group of Reach infiltrators and a negotiator invade Jaime's school's dance. Having been inspired by the scarab to rebel, the Kahji Dha Revolutionary Army (KDRA) sets out to make Earth safe by destroying those that could pose any threat. They see Jaime as a threat and attack. During the fight, Nadia, part of Jaime's tech support, is killed. Taking the fight into orbit, Jaime has the scarab hack into and deactivate the KDRA, but deactivates itself for 27 days in the process. The negotiator quickly recovers and Jaime is forced to take him on a kamikaze dive to the Earth's surface. The impact kills the negotiator and badly hurts Jaime, although the scarab protects him from the brunt of the impact. Over a period of weeks, Jaime and the scarab slowly recover. Unbeknownst to Jaime, the Reach negotiator's scarab is recovered by Hector, Jaime's other tech support.

=== Further adventures ===
Starting in Booster Gold vol. 2 #21, Blue Beetle was featured as a 10-page ongoing co-feature. The stories focused on a smaller cast than before, focusing on Jaime, Paco and Brenda while Jaime's family occasionally appears. The rebooted scarab is shown to be more bloodthirsty than in the past, constantly urging Jaime to use more lethal weaponry. Jaime encounters Black Beetle, who claims to be his future self and injures Milagro Reyes. Soon after, Jaime is attacked by Ted Kord, who has been resurrected as a Black Lantern. Jaime and Booster Gold work together to destroy Kord with a special light gun that separates him from his Black Lantern ring.

=== Justice League: Generation Lost ===
During the Brightest Day storyline, Deadman has a vision of Jaime shaking hands with Maxwell Lord, who is holding a gun behind his back. Jaime informs Static that he plans to briefly leave to visit his family, fearing what would happen if he were to die without saying goodbye. Shortly after arriving home, Jaime and his family are attacked by a squad of OMACs. Jaime repels the OMACs, but is accidentally sucked into a teleportation rift that they created. The heroes end up in Russia, where Jaime learns of Lord and his attempt to make the world forget he ever existed. He agrees to help the former Justice League members bring Lord to justice.

=== The New 52 ===
In September 2011 after the conclusion of the "Flashpoint" storyline event, DC Comics cancelled all of its monthly books and relaunched 52 new monthly titles with a new continuity, in what was called The New 52. One of the new series as a Blue Beetle series written by Tony Bedard and drawn by Ig Guara and cancelled in February 2013.

Jaime Reyes and his friend Paco are driving to a party when a fight over a backpack between some men and the Brotherhood of Evil members Phobia, Plasmus, and Warp erupts from a nearby building. To protect Paco, Jaime grabs the backpack. When La Dama's agents Brutale, Bone-Crusher, and Coyote join the fight, Brutale throws a knife at the backpack. The scarab inside is set off and Jaime is transformed into Blue Beetle.

In Green Lantern: New Guardians, representatives of the Reach attack Odym, homeworld of the Blue Lantern Corps, where it is revealed that their armours have taken control of them; Jaime speculates, during a confrontation with Kyle Rayner, that his armour is damaged, explaining why he is in control of himself where other Reach soldiers are enslaved to their armour.

=== DC Rebirth ===
In the 2016 relaunch of the DC Universe, DC Rebirth, Jaime is working with Ted Kord to study the beetle attached to Jaime's back and remove it. Once again, the beetle's origin is retconned, as revealed by Doctor Fate, who tells Kord that the beetle is not alien, but magical, similar to the original continuity pre-Infinite Crisis.

=== Graduation Day ===
In the Blue Beetle: Graduation Day miniseries, Jaime is still continuing his superhero duties as Blue Beetle while also finally graduating from high school. During the ceremony, he gets a transmission from the scarab indicating that the Reach are planning something. After Jaime's graduation party, Superman and Jaime share a heart to heart about Jaime's uncertainty for his future and what he wants for himself. Superman then informs Jaime that, until they get a better understanding of the Reach broadcast, Jaime is "grounded" from being Blue Beetle and should spend time with his family. Jaime then find out from his parents that, because he is not attending college, he will be heading to Palmera City to work at the family diner for the summer. Then, Paco shows everyone a video of a mysterious Yellow Beetle arriving in Sensuntepeque.

== Powers and abilities ==
The Blue Beetle scarab is grafted onto Jaime Reyes's spine and can manifest a number of powers of its own volition, an act usually accompanied by blue energy emitted by the scarab's "antennae". Over the course of the first year of his ongoing series, Jaime had little control over those powers, but slowly asserts himself. When Jaime is in danger, the scarab activates, crawling out on to Jaime's back and generating a high-tech suit of powered armor around his body. The armor is resilient enough that it can protect him against re-entry from Earth's orbit.

When in use, the suit can reconfigure itself to produce a wide array of armaments. Common functions include an energy cannon, a sword and shield, a grappling hook, a device resembling a communications satellite, and a set of foot-long powered blades. In addition, the suit can produce a set of wings for flight that can also act as shields. The suit can adapt to different situations, including producing energy discharges from the hands that can neutralize magic, discharging Kryptonite radiation and tuning "vibrational frequencies" of extra-dimensional objects to make them visible.

The scarab has at least one power it can manifest whether dormant or active; it can give Jaime a peculiar form of "sight" to perceive extra-dimensional objects, which gather information on the scarab user's adversaries. The scarab can communicate with him in a more comprehensible fashion if necessary. The scarab's language slowly morphs into a format resembling English, claiming Khaji Da as its name and Jaime as its friend. However, it has occasional language relapses. The suit is capable of compensating for Jaime's digestive system, so that he does not need to expel waste materials when using the suit, and can even make paper from dead skin cells.

When necessary, Jaime can have the Scarab take over in Infiltrator Mode. When this happens, the suit becomes taller, more muscular and grows spikes and allows the scarab to fight without Jaime's conscience as a restriction. This lets it fight more brutally, but Jaime and the scarab do not like this and only resort to it in desperate situations.

== Other versions ==
- A possible future version of Jaime Reyes appears in Justice Society of America vol. 3 #37-38. This version lost his powers after a group of white supremacists led by Captain Nazi activated their Great Darkness Engine to neutralize most of the world's metahumans. After being taken prisoner by them, he is later killed by security guards while helping his fellow prisoners escape.
- A possible future version of Blue Beetle appears in Titans Tomorrow, in which he is killed by Red Devil.
- An alternate timeline version of Jaime appears in Flashpoint. This version is a member of the Ambush Bugs who is later killed amidst a failed attack on the Amazons.

== Collected editions ==
The Blue Beetle series has been collected into a number of trade paperbacks:

Vol. #	Title	Collected material	Pages	Year	ISBN
1	Shellshocked	Blue Beetle vol. 7, #1–6	144	2006	978-1-4012-0965-0
2	Road Trip	Blue Beetle vol. 7, #7–12	144	2007	978-1-4012-1361-9
3	Reach for the Stars	Blue Beetle vol. 7, #13–19	168	2008	978-1-4012-1642-9
4	End Game	Blue Beetle vol. 7, #20–26	176	2008	978-1-4012-1952-9
5	Boundaries	Blue Beetle vol. 7, #29–34	144	2009	978-1-4012-2162-1
6	Black and Blue	Blue Beetle vol. 7, #27–28, #35–36; Booster Gold vol. 2, #21–25, #28–29	168	2010	978-1-4012-2897-2
The New 52
1	Metamorphosis	Blue Beetle vol. 8, #1–6	144	November 20, 2012	978-1401237134
2	Blue Diamond	Blue Beetle vol. 8, #0, 7–16; Green Lantern: New Guardians #9	240	April 30, 2013	978-1401238506
DC Rebirth
1	The More Things Change	Blue Beetle: Rebirth #1; Blue Beetle vol. 9 #1–5	144	May 16, 2017	978-1401268688
2	Hard Choices	Blue Beetle vol. 9 #6–12	168	January 2, 2018	978-1401275075
3	Road to Nowhere	Blue Beetle vol. 9 #13–18	144	July 17, 2018	978-1401280833

== In other media ==
=== Television ===
Jaime Reyes / Blue Beetle as he appears in Smallville

Jaime Reyes / Blue Beetle as he appears in Batman: The Brave and the Bold

- Jaime Reyes / Blue Beetle appears in the Smallville episode "Booster", portrayed by Jaren Brandt Bartlett. This version is a shy and clumsy teenager from Metropolis who was bullied until he bonded to the Blue Beetle scarab following a traffic accident near Kord Industries. Seeking to find the scarab, Ted Kord hires Booster Gold to help, leading to the latter fighting Reyes before convincing him to stand up for himself. Kord offers to remove the scarab, but Reyes chooses to keep it and become a hero with Booster's help.
- Jaime Reyes / Blue Beetle appears in Batman: The Brave and the Bold, voiced by Will Friedle.
- In 2010, Geoff Johns announced a TV series featuring Jaime Reyes / Blue Beetle, with a test trailer starring Garrett Plotkin as Reyes being released. Scenes of this trailer were shown as part of the DC Nation block of programming in 2012 on Cartoon Network during the premiere of Green Lantern: The Animated Series. However, no further announcements have been made.
- Jaime Reyes / Blue Beetle appears in Young Justice, voiced by Eric Lopez. This version is initially a member of the Team who became attached to the Blue Beetle scarab while passing by Kord Industries after Ted Kord's sacrifice to stop the Light from obtaining the device. Additionally, Reyes does not experience pain while transforming into the Blue Beetle. Moreover, the Scarab can speak in English, finds lethal courses of action preferable to capture and restraint, and was severed from the Reach's control after landing on Earth centuries prior and being cleansed by ancient Bialyan mystics. After being misled by the Reach's Green Martian thrall, B'arzz O'oomm / Green Beetle, Reyes and the Scarab fall under the Reach's control until the Team use the ancient mystics' magic to free them along with Green Beetle. Reyes would go on to help thwart the Reach's invasion of Earth and, in the third season, join Beast Boy's Outsiders and enter a relationship with Traci Thurston.
- Jaime Reyes / Blue Beetle appears in Justice League Action, voiced by Jake T. Austin.

=== Film ===
- Jaime Reyes / Blue Beetle appears in films set in the DC Animated Movie Universe (DCAMU), voiced again by Jake T. Austin. This version is a member of the Teen Titans. Introduced in Justice League vs. Teen Titans, Reyes makes subsequent appearances in Teen Titans: The Judas Contract and Justice League Dark: Apokolips War, where he is killed by Paradooms.

==== DC Extended Universe / DC Universe ====
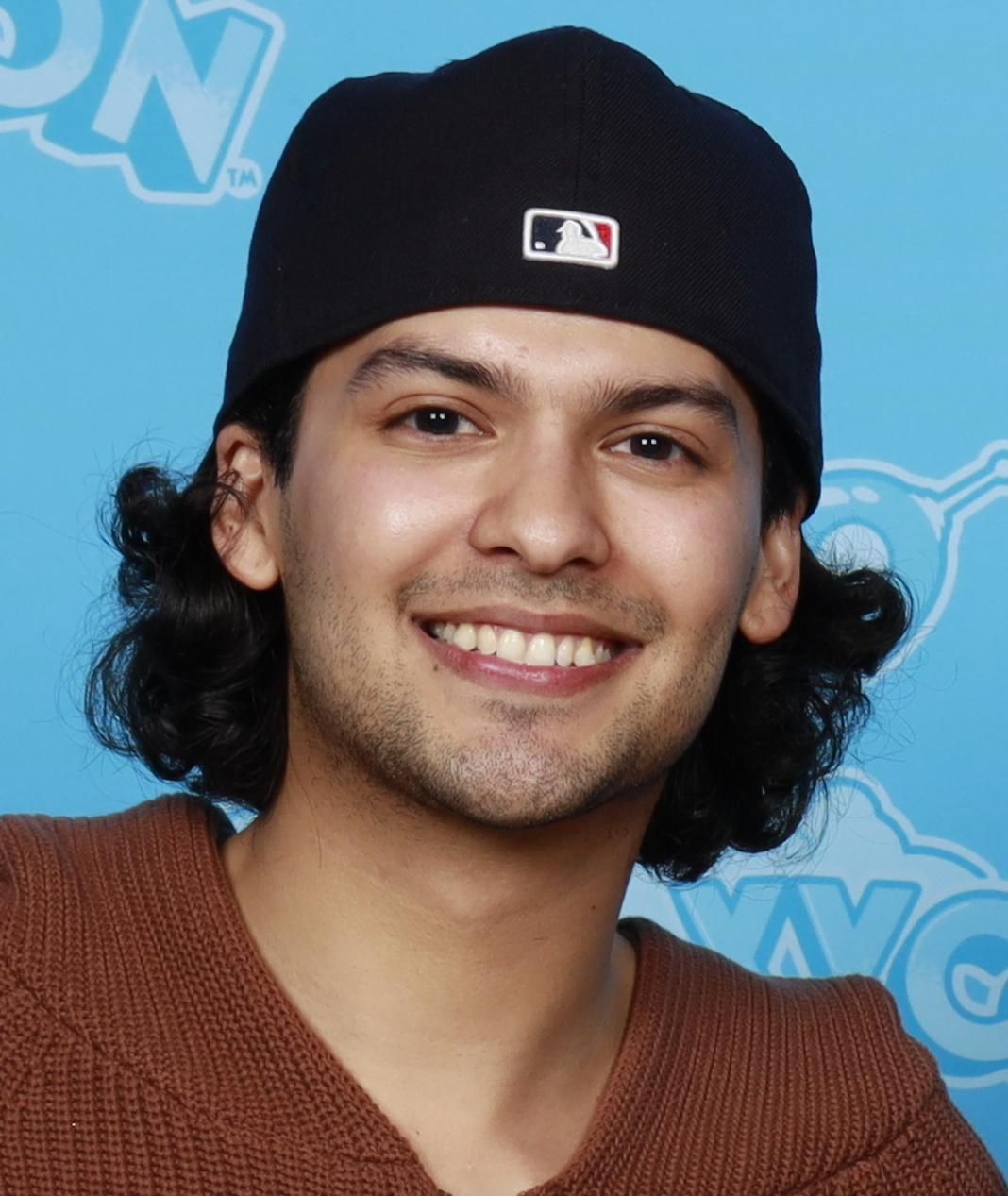
Jaime Reyes is depicted by Xolo Maridueña in Blue Beetle (2023)

- Jaime Reyes / Blue Beetle appears in media set in the DC Extended Universe (DCEU) and DC Universe (DCU) franchises, portrayed by Xolo Maridueña.
  - Reyes first appears in the DCEU film Blue Beetle (2023). This version is a recent college graduate from Palmera City who was personally entrusted with the Scarab by Jenny Kord to keep it away from Victoria Kord.
  - Reyes will return in the DCU film Man of Tomorrow (2027).
  - Reyes will appear in a Blue Beetle animated series set in the DCU.

=== Video games ===
- Jaime Reyes / Blue Beetle appears as a playable character in Batman: The Brave and the Bold – The Videogame, voiced again by Will Friedle.
- Jaime Reyes / Blue Beetle appears as a DLC character in Young Justice: Legacy, voiced again by Eric Lopez.
- Jaime Reyes / Blue Beetle appears as a playable character in Infinite Crisis, voiced again by Eric Lopez.
- Jaime Reyes / Blue Beetle appears as a character summon in Scribblenauts Unmasked: A DC Comics Adventure.
- Jaime Reyes / Blue Beetle appears as a playable character in Lego Batman 3: Beyond Gotham, voiced by Dee Bradley Baker.
- Jaime Reyes / Blue Beetle appears as a playable character in Injustice 2, voiced by Antony Del Rio. This version is a member of Batman's Insurgency.
- Jaime Reyes / Blue Beetle appears as a playable character in Lego DC Super-Villains, voiced by Josh Keaton.
- Jaime Reyes / Blue Beetle appears as a playable character in Teen Titans Go Figure!.

=== Miscellaneous ===
- Jaime Reyes appears in DC Universe Online: Legends as one of several metahumans gathered by Lex Luthor.
- Jaime Reyes appears in Smallville: Titans as a member of Jay Garrick's Teen Titans.
- Jaime Reyes / Blue Beetle appears in the Young Justice tie-in comic.
- The Injustice incarnation of Jaime Reyes / Blue Beetle appears in the Injustice 2 prequel comic as a protege of Ted Kord.
- Jaime Reyes / Blue Beetle makes cameo appearances in DC Super Hero Girls as a student of Super Hero High.
