= Overthrow (comics) =

- Overthrow as depicted in Millennium #2 (January 1988). Art by Joe Staton.

Publication information
- Publisher: DC Comics
- First appearance: Blue Beetle (vol. 2) #15 (August 1987)
- Created by: Len Wein (writer); Ross Andru (artist)

In-story information
- Full name: Arnold Daniel Beck
- Team affiliations: Manhunters
- Abilities: Armored battlesuit provides flight and protection Cybernetic cesta throws explosive spheres

Overthrow (Arnold Beck) is a DC Comics supervillain who serves as an adversary to the Blue Beetle.

== Fictional character biography ==
Arnold Beck is an embittered employee let go from Kord Omniversal (the corporation run by Ted Kord, the Blue Beetle) who believes himself to be a victim of the military–industrial complex, of which Kord's company is a prime element. Utlilizing powered armor and a stylized weapon that hurls explosives, Beck intends to demolish Kord's facilities; this brings him into conflict with the Blue Beetle, who handily defeats him.

=== The Millennium Affair ===
During the Millennium event, the intergalactic group known as the Manhunters becomes set on stopping the Guardians of the Universe. Overthrow is revealed to have been working with the Manhunters, who provided him with his armor. On the Manhunters' orders, Overthrow attempts to contain and impede Blue Beetle's activities. Beetle once again defeats Overthrow. Following the defeat of Earth's Manhunters by the combined heroes of Earth, Overthrow disappears.

=== Death ===
Overthrow lives for some time in Zandia, the former demesne of Brother Blood's Church of Blood. Overthrow is part of Zandia's Olympic team, which is made up largely of supervillains. In the series The OMAC Project, Overthrow is targeted by Maxwell Lord, who sends an OMAC to kill him.

== Weapons ==
Overthrow's armored battlesuit's primary weapon was its cybernetic cesta, which allowed him to hurl explosive spheres with superhuman accuracy and velocity. The suit also gave Beck a degree of protection and allowed him to fly.
