= Desert Hawk =

Desert Hawk or The Desert Hawk may refer to:

== Characters ==
- Dagar, Desert Hawk, Fox Feature Syndicate Arabian desert comic book adventurer during 1947–49

== Films ==
- The Desert Hawk (1924 film), American independent silent western
- The Desert Hawk (serial), 1944 American 15-chapter Middle East-set swashbuckler from Columbia
- The Desert Hawk (1950 film), American Middle East-set color swashbuckler from Universal

== Military ==
- Operation Desert Hawk, Pakistani military moves in Rann of Kutch during 1965 Indo-Pakistani War
- Lockheed Martin Desert Hawk, 2002 American unmanned aircraft
  - Desert Hawk III, 2006 further development from above unmanned aircraft
