= Blue Beetle (Dan Garrett) =

Comic book superhero

Dan Garrett Blue Beetle
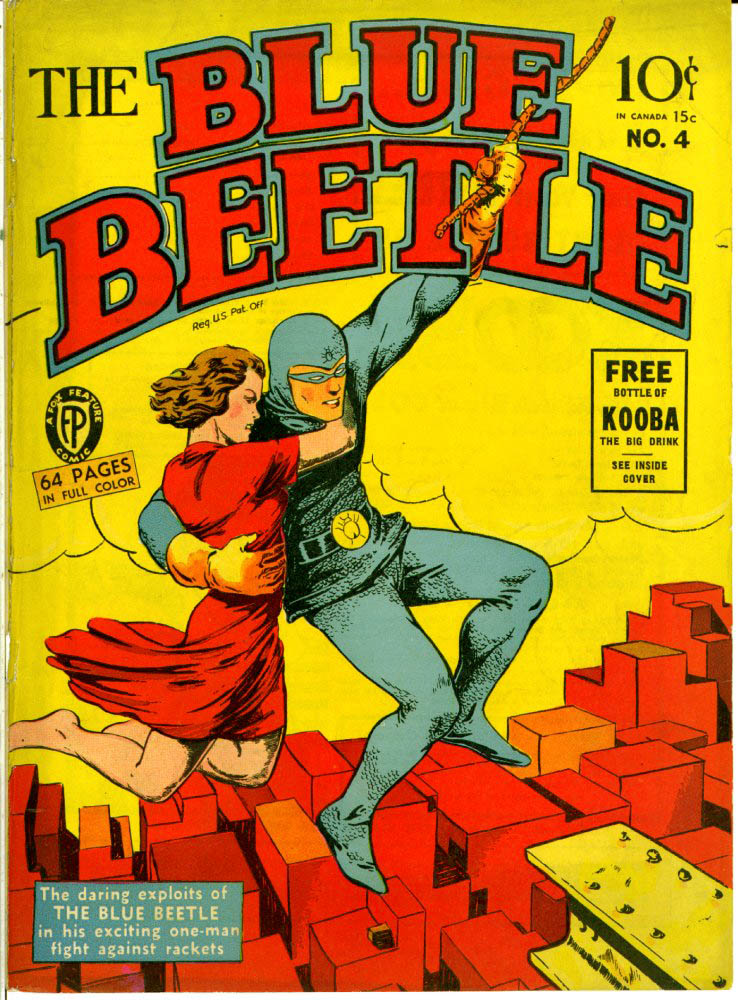
- Cover of Blue Beetle #4 (October 1940). Artist unknown, possibly Edd Ashe.

Publication information
- Publisher: Fox Comics; Holyoke Publishing; Charlton Comics; DC Comics
- First appearance: Mystery Men Comics #1 (August 1939)
- Created by: Charles Wojtkoski

In-story information
- Alter ego: Dan Garrett (in the Charlton and DC comics)
- Species: Metahuman
- Team affiliations: Justice Society Dark
- Notable aliases: Silver Scarab
- Abilities: Archaeology; Hand-to-hand combat; The Scarab grants: Flight; Energy projection; Superhuman strength; Superhuman durability

Daniel "Dan" Garrett, originally spelled "Garret," is a fictional superhero appearing in American comic books published by Fox Comics, Holyoke Publishing, Charlton Comics, and DC Comics. Garrett was created by Charles Wojtkoski, and made his first appearance in Fox's Mystery Men Comics #1 during the Golden Age of Comic Books. Garrett is the first character to use the identity of Blue Beetle, predating Ted Kord and Jaime Reyes.

== Publication history ==
The character first appeared in Mystery Men Comics #1 (August 1939), published by Fox Comics with art by Charles Wojtkoski. Blue Beetle has starred in a comic book series, comic strip and radio serial, but like most Golden Age of Comic Books superheroes, fell into obscurity in the 1950s. The comic book series saw several anomalies in publication: 19 issues, #12 through #30, were published through Holyoke Publishing; no issue #43 was published; publication frequency varied throughout the run; and there were gaps where issues were not published, with large ones occurring in early 1947 and between mid-1948 and early 1950.

In the mid-1950s, Charlton Comics began publishing the character following Fox Comics's bankruptcy.

== Fictional character biography ==
=== Golden Age version (Dan Garret) ===
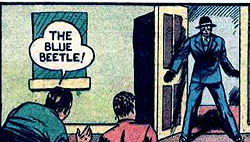
The first appearance of the Blue Beetle, Mystery Men Comics #1 (1939), art by Charles Nicholas.

Dan Garret was a son of a police officer killed by a criminal. This Fox Feature Syndicate version of the character debuted in Mystery Men Comics #1 (August 1939) and continued through issue #31. He began appearing in his own 60-issue series shortly thereafter. Fox Feature Syndicate sponsored a "Blue Beetle Day" at the 1939 New York World's Fair on August 7, 1940, beginning at 10:30 a.m. and including 300 children in relay-race finals at the Field of Special Events, following preliminaries in New York City parks. The race was broadcast on the radio station WMCA.

Rookie patrolman Dan Garret originally fought crime as Blue Beetle without the benefit of superhuman abilities. Garret later donned a bulletproof blue costume made of lightweight, yet durable cellulose and temporarily gained superhuman strength and stamina via "Vitamin 2X". Like the Green Hornet, the Blue Beetle would use his signature scarab symbol to bedevil criminals.

The supporting cast remained fairly stable throughout this original run and included Joan Mason, a reporter for the Daily Blade who starred in solo backup stories, and Mike Mannigan, Dan's police partner who believed him to be a criminal. Dr. Franz, a pharmacist and the creator of Dan's bulletproof suit and 2X formula, also played a large role. The Beetle also had a short-lived kid sidekick, Sparky.

During World War II, Garret became a government agent who was often sent overseas on secret missions, but after peace was declared he returned to his former role of neighborhood cop. Blue Beetle's powers slowly increased over time, eventually giving him the ability to fly and, in one story near the very end, X-ray vision.

A popular character in his era, the Blue Beetle had his own short-lived comic strip, drawn by a pseudonymous Jack Kirby and others, and a radio serial that ran for 48 thirteen-minute episodes.

=== Silver Age version (Dan Garrett) ===
Blue Beetle vol. 2, #1 (June 1964), cover art by Frank McLaughlin.

Charlton Comics allegedly obtained the rights to the Blue Beetle (although there is no proof that a formal purchase ever took place) and reprinted some stories in its anthology titles and in a four-issue Blue Beetle reprint series numbered 18–21.

In 1964, during the Silver Age of comics, Charlton revised the character for a new Blue Beetle series. Charlton's new Blue Beetle retained the original's name (adding a second "t"), but no powers or back story, making him a different character. This Beetle was archaeologist Dan Garrett, who obtained a number of superhuman powers (including super strength, x-ray vision, flight, and the ability to generate energy blasts) from a mystical scarab he found during a dig in Egypt, where it had been used to imprison an evil mummified pharaoh. This version, by writer Joe Gill and artist Tony Tallarico, was played at least initially for camp, with stories like "The Giant Mummy Who Was Not Dead". The Charlton Dan Garrett version of the Blue Beetle ran only until 1966 before his replacement Ted Kord debuted. In Blue Beetle #2 (1967), Garrett is killed in battle with Jarvis Kord, Ted's evil uncle.

=== AC Comics ===
Both Blue Beetles reappeared in the third issue of Americomics, a title published by AC Comics in 1983/1984. In the first story in this issue, Ted Kord fought a bogus Dan Garrett, but the second story was more significant. It revealed that the original 1940s Dan was reincarnated as the Silver Age version by an unspecified group of "gods", presumably the ones responsible for his mystic scarab. The gods subsequently resurrect Dan again and sent him to save Ted Kord. After this adventure, Kord turned the Blue Beetle name back over to Dan. Americomics was canceled after issue #6, and so far this story has never been referenced by any other publisher.

=== DC Comics ===
The Charlton version of Dan Garrett was spotlighted in the second issue of DC's 1980s Secret Origins series, in which his origin was retold along with that of Ted Kord. Subsequent appearances by Dan Garrett (in flashback stories) include guest spots or cameos in Infinity, Inc., Captain Atom, JLA: Year One, and Legends of the DC Universe.

The character briefly returned in DC Comics' first run of Blue Beetle, resurrected by his mystical scarab to battle against his successor. He can also be seen in various flashback stories. His 1940s incarnation is briefly glimpsed in DC's 1993 limited series The Golden Age.

=== Dynamite Entertainment ===
In issue #0 of the Project Superpowers miniseries, the Fox Feature Syndicate version of the Blue Beetle appeared in flashbacks (as by now the character/spelling "Dan Garret" was in the public domain). To avoid trademark conflicts with DC Comics, he is referred to in this series by the nickname "Big Blue".

=== DC Universe ===
In 2025 as part of the "DC All In" initiative, Dan Garrett appeared in the Green Lantern series, now going by the name "Silver Scarab" and with powers including powerful energy blasts.

The series New History of the DC Universe reveals that Garrett was a member of the Justice Society Dark.

== Powers and abilities ==
Dan Garrett is an expert archaeologist. He is also an expert at hand-to-hand combat.

The Scarab grants Dan Garrett the abilities of flight, energy projection, superhuman strength, and superhuman durability. He would later gain the Khaja Sha Scarab during the "DC All In" initiative.

== Other versions ==
=== Earth-19 ===
The Earth-19 Blue Beetle

An alternate universe variant of Dan Garrett from Earth-19 appears in The Search for Ray Palmer: Gotham by Gaslight. This version is the leading Egyptologist of the Gotham Museum of Natural History.

=== Earth-39 ===
An alternate universe variant of Daniel Garrett from Earth-39 appears in Countdown: Arena #2.

== In other media ==
=== Television ===
- Dan Garrett / Blue Beetle makes non-speaking cameo appearances in Batman: The Brave and the Bold.
- Dan Garrett / Blue Beetle makes non-speaking cameo appearances in Young Justice. This version was primarily active in the 1940s, having found and bonded with the Blue Beetle scarab after Bialyan mystics severed its connection to the Reach centuries prior, and fought alongside the Justice Society of America.

=== Film ===
- Dan Garret appears on the cover of a comic book in the Watchmen film tie-in Under the Hood.
- The 2012 film Agent Beetle stars Daniel Lavigne as Dan Garret.

=== Miscellaneous ===
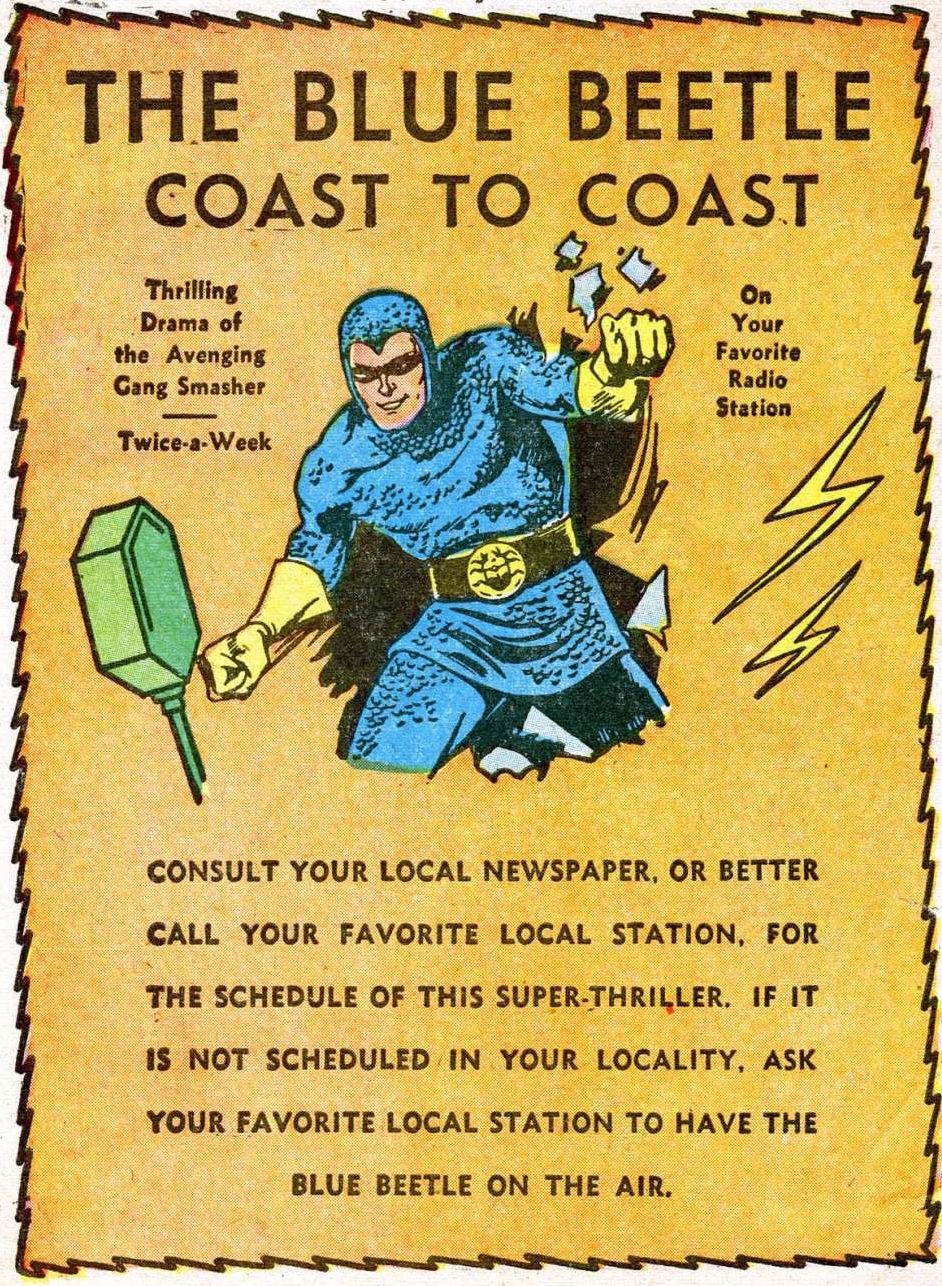
Ad for The Blue Beetle radio series.

- Dan Garret / Blue Beetle appears in a self-titled CBS Radio serial, which ran from May 15, 1940, to September 13, 1940, and initially starred Frank Lovejoy in the title role. According to Christopher Irving, "Lovejoy brought a maniacal, almost sadistic, cackle to the character. His Blue Beetle seemed as if he took some sick pride in hurting criminals". When Lovejoy left the show after four episodes, he was replaced with an uncredited actor.
- Dan Garrett / Blue Beetle appears in a short-lived comic strip, drawn by Jack Kirby, among others, under pseudonyms.
