= Xolo Maridueña =

American actor (born 2001)

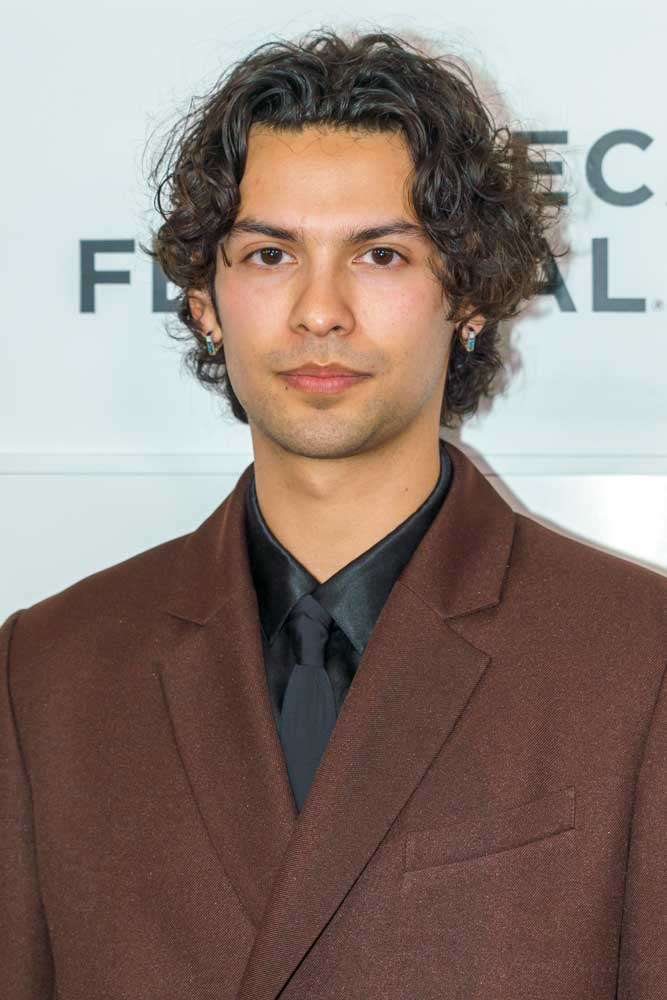
- Maridueña at the 2026 Tribeca Film Festival
- Born: Ramario Xolo Ramirez; June 9, 2001 (age 25); Los Angeles, California, U.S.
- Occupation: Actor
- Years active: 2011–present

Ramario Xolo Ramirez (born June 9, 2001), known professionally as Xolo Maridueña (/ˈʃoʊloʊ mɑːriˈdwɛnjə/ SHOH-loh mah-ree-DWEH-nyə; Spanish: [ˈʃolo maɾiˈðweɲa]), is an American actor. He began his career as a child, starring as Victor Graham in the NBC drama Parenthood (2012–2015), and rose to prominence for playing Miguel Diaz, Johnny Lawrence's first student in the Netflix action series Cobra Kai (2018–2025), and Jaime Reyes / Blue Beetle in the DC Comics superhero film Blue Beetle (2023).

== Early life ==
Maridueña was born on June 9, 2001, in Los Angeles, California to Omar G. Ramirez and Carmelita Ramirez-Sánchez. He has four sisters. He is of Mexican, Cuban, and Ecuadorian descent. His birth name, Ramario, is a combination of Ramón and Mario, the names of his maternal uncles.

Maridueña grew up in the El Sereno neighborhood and attended El Sereno Middle School. When he was around 10 years old, Maridueña joined the CASA 0101 theater company where he trained as an actor and performed in his first productions. He later studied at Cathedral High School and Pasadena City College.

== Career ==
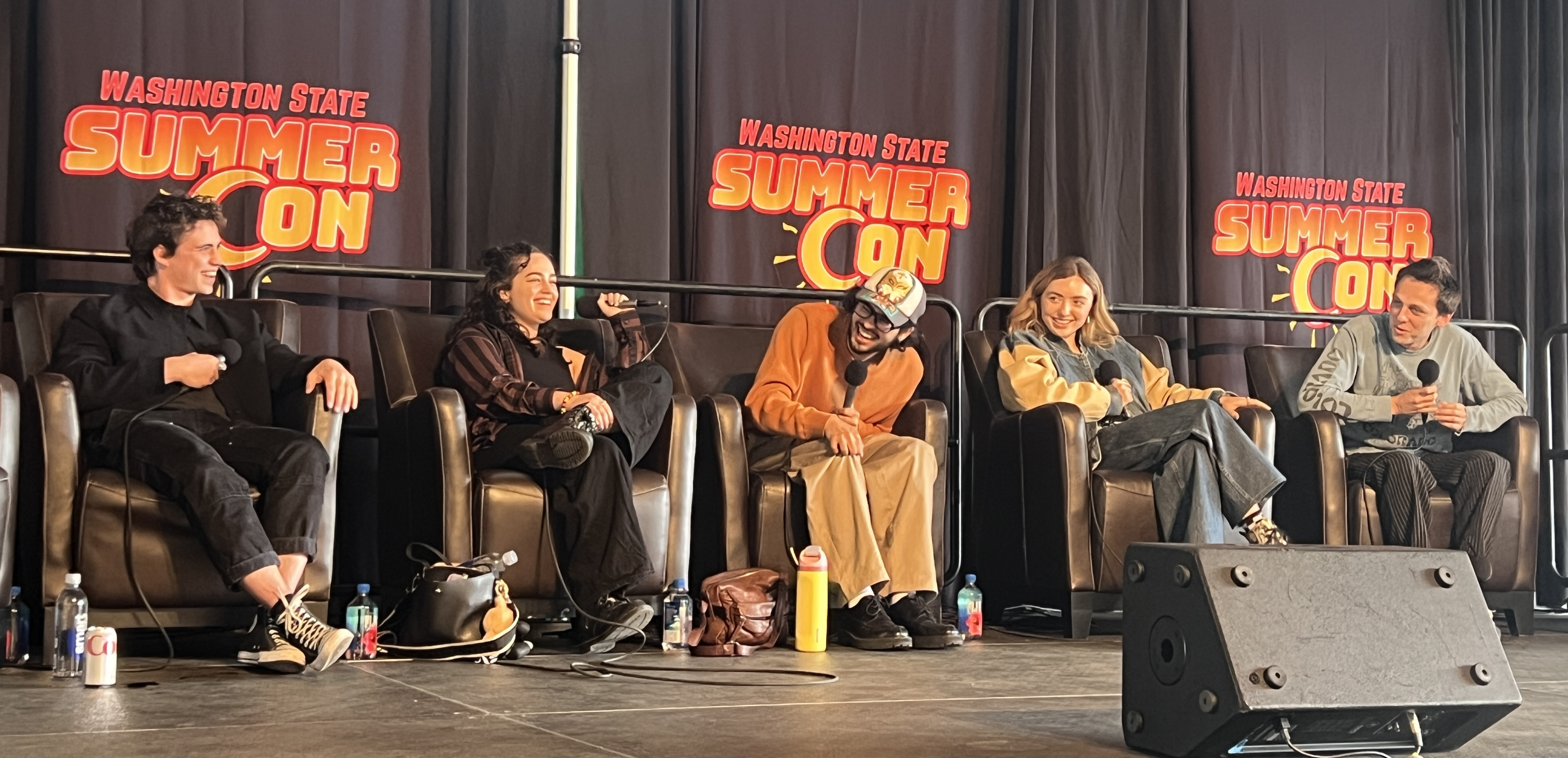
Maridueña (center) shares the stage with cast members from Cobra Kai at a convention in Washington state on June 22, 2025.

Maridueña's first professional job was modeling for a Sears catalog. He then first starred on the series Parenthood when he was 11, between 2012 and 2015. He then appeared in Cobra Kai as the lead role of Miguel Díaz when he was 16; he appeared in every episode of the show.

Together with Jacob Bertrand, Maridueña co-hosts the Lone Lobos podcast, which debuted in September 2021.

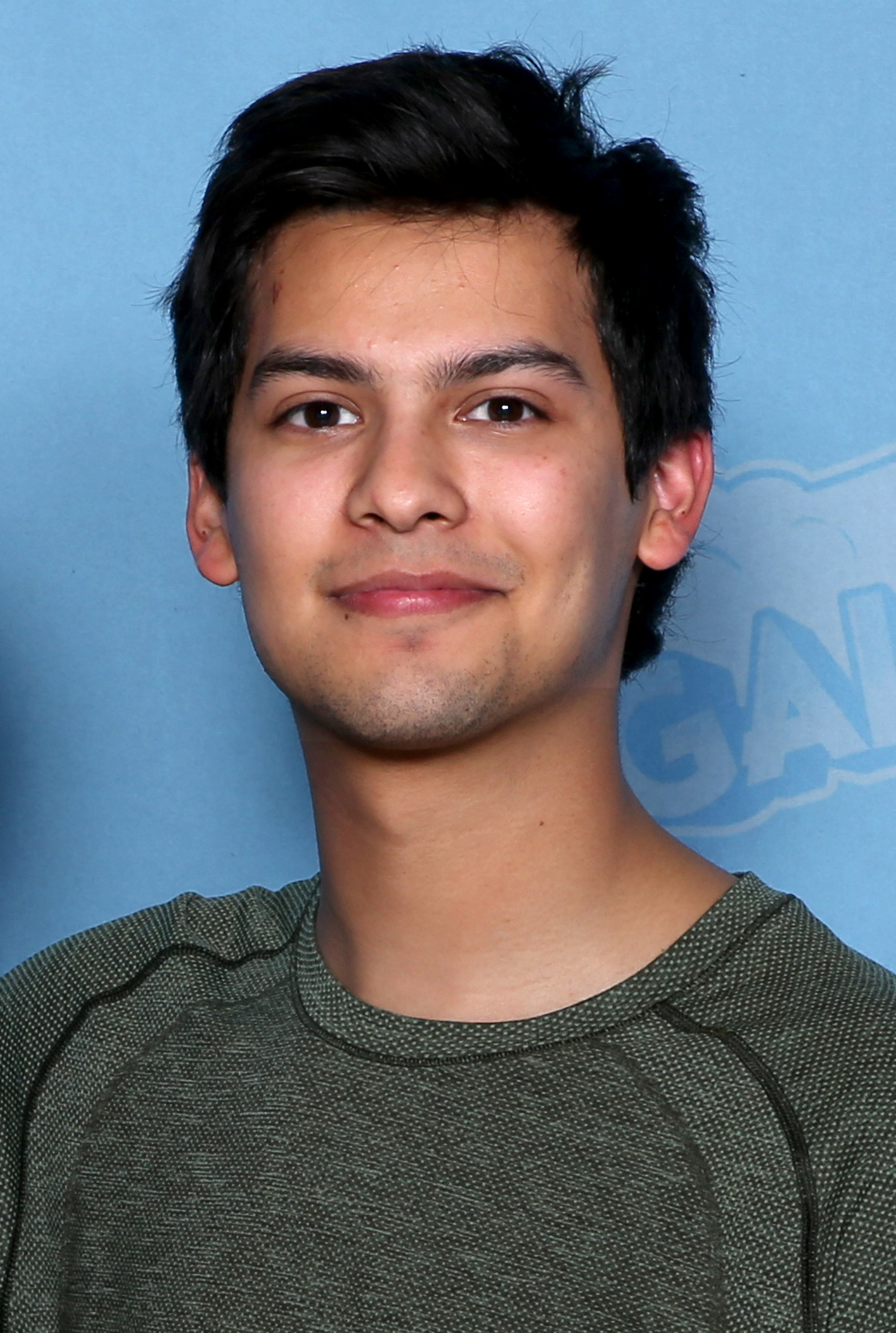
Maridueña in 2019

Maridueña has said of his role as Blue Beetle (the first Latino superhero character to feature in a live-action film) "The only thing that is on my mind right now is just the fact that he's Latino. I have so much pride in getting to be a part of this project... I think it's so important, and I don’t want to stand on the soapbox for too long but representation is so important."

On August 18, 2023, Maridueña released his debut single, "On My Way" (featuring singer Adriana Padilla). In December 2023, he was cast in the film Killing Castro.

Maridueña appeared in a commercial for Taco Bell in September 2024 and an episode of J Balvin's docuseries A Great Day With J Balvin in October 2024. He voiced the role of Brainy Smurf in the 2025 animated film Smurfs, joining stars such as Rihanna and James Corden. Maridueña stars in Dog Years, an upcoming indie romance by Mary Bronaugh. In July 2025, Maridueña joined the cast of Practical Magic 2, in which he plays Gideon. In November 2025, he was announced for the role of Portgas D. Ace in the Netflix series One Piece.

Mariduena is set to make his Broadway debut as Juan De Marcos in Buena Vista Social Club for a seven-week limited engagement from November 17-January 3, 2027.

== Personal life ==
Maridueña practices the religion Ifá. He was previously in a relationship with his Cobra Kai co-star Hannah Kepple, from 2019 to 2022.

== Filmography ==
Key
†	Denotes films that have not yet been released

=== Film ===
Year	Title	Role	Notes
2013	Dealin' with Idiots	Manny	
2020	Goodnight America	Steve	Short
2021	#Whitina	Chris	Short
2023	Blue Beetle	Jaime Reyes / Blue Beetle	
2025	Code 3	Rookie EMT	
2025	Smurfs	Brainy Smurf	Voice
2026	Killing Castro	Leonel	
2026	Practical Magic 2	Gideon	
2027	Man of Tomorrow †	Jaime Reyes / Blue Beetle	Post-production
TBA	Dog Years †	Alejandro	Post-production

Key
†	Denotes television productions that have not yet been released

=== Television ===
Year	Title	Role	Notes
2011–2015	Parenthood	Victor Graham	Guest (season 3), main (seasons 4–6)
2013	Major Crimes	Stefan Camacho	Episode: "Rules of Engagement"
2016	Mack & Moxy	Trooper Xolo	Episode: "S.T.E.M. Strong"
2016	Rush Hour	Isaiah	Episode: "Captain Cole's Playlist"
2016	Furst Born	Shawn	Television film
2017	Twin Peaks	Boy (1956)	Episode: "Part 8"
2018	Noches con Platanito	Himself	Game show
2018–2025	Cobra Kai	Miguel Diaz	Main role
2019–2021	Cleopatra in Space	Zaid	Voice
2019–2022	Victor and Valentino	Andres	Voice
2020	Fast & Furious Spy Racers	Lucas	Voice
2021	Wu-Tang: An American Saga	King Tech	Episode: "As High as Wu-Tang Gets"
2021	The Netflix Afterparty	Himself	Episode: "Cobra Kai"
2022	The Boys Presents: Diabolical	Aqua Agua	Voice, episode: "An Animated Short Where Pissed-Off Supes Kill Their Parents"
2022–present	Batwheels	Snowy the Snowcrawler	Voice
2024	Moon Girl and Devil Dinosaur	Kid Kree / Mel-Varr	Voice
2024	A Great Day with J Balvin	Himself	Episode: "Crate Digging with Xolo Maridueña"
2025	Sakamoto Days	Heisuke Mashimo	Voice, English dub
2025	Invincible	Fightmaster & Dropkick	Voice, 2 episodes
TBA	One Piece †	Portgas D. Ace	Season 3

=== Theater ===
Year	Title	Role	Venue	Notes
2026	Buena Vista Social Club	Juan de Marcos González	Gerald Schoenfeld Theatre	Broadway debut

== Discography ==
Year	Title
2023	"On My Way" (feat. Adriana Padilla)
2024	The Scarab Tapes (EP)

== Awards and nominations ==
Year	Awards	Category	Nominated work	Result
2014	Imagen Awards	Best Young Actor/Television	Parenthood	Nominated
2014	Young Artist Awards	Outstanding Young Ensemble in a TV Series	Parenthood	Won
2014	Young Artist Awards	Best Performance in a TV Series - Supporting Young Actor	Parenthood	Nominated
2015	Imagen Awards	Best Young Actor/Television	Parenthood	Nominated
2018	Imagen Awards	Best Young Actor/Television	Cobra Kai	Nominated
2018	Teen Choice Awards	Choice Summer TV Actor	Cobra Kai	Nominated
2019	Young Artist Awards	Best Performance in a Streaming Series or Film: Teen Actor	Cobra Kai	Nominated
2022	NHMC Impact Awards	Rising Star Impact Award	Cobra Kai	Won
2024	Saturn Awards	Best Younger Actor in a Film	Blue Beetle	Won
2025	Kids' Choice Awards	Favorite Male TV Star (Family)	Cobra Kai	Won
