= Countdown to Infinite Crisis =

2005 comic book

DC Countdown
- Cover to DC Countdown. Art by Jim Lee and Alex Ross.

Publication information
- Publisher: DC Comics
- Format: One-shot
- Genre: Superhero
- Publication date: May 2005
- No. of issues: 1

Creative team
- Written by: Geoff Johns; Greg Rucka; Judd Winick
- Artist: Ed Benes
- Penciller(s): Rags Morales; Jesus Saiz; Ivan Reis; Phil Jimenez
- Inker(s): Michael Bair; Jimmy Palmiotti; Marc Campos; Andy Lanning

DC Countdown, commonly referred to as Countdown to Infinite Crisis, is a one-shot publication and the official start of the "Infinite Crisis" storyline. It was released on 30 March 2005, sold out, and quickly went to a second printing. When this comic was first published, the cover showed Batman holding a shadowed corpse, so as not to ruin the surprise of who dies. For the second printing, the shadows were removed to reveal the identity of the corpse. During initial solicitations the comic was entitled DC Countdown, which was meant to postpone revelation of an upcoming crisis.

Countdown was a special 80 page comic originally priced at $1, much lower than would normally be the case for an 80-page comic, although the second printing was priced at $2. The script was co-written by Geoff Johns, Greg Rucka, and Judd Winick, while the art chores were divided up, generally on a chapter by chapter basis, between the penciller-inker teams of Rags Morales & Michael Bair, Jesus Saiz & Jimmy Palmiotti, Ivan Reis & Marc Campos, and Phil Jimenez & Andy Lanning. Artist Ed Benes pencilled and inked his chapter.

== Synopsis ==
The main plot concerns Ted Kord, the superhero and former Justice League member known as the Blue Beetle, investigating the theft of funds from his company that has left him nearly bankrupt. Most of the other DC heroes except Wonder Woman dismiss Kord's concerns, either politely or, like Batman, who now remembers that the League had mind-wiped him, outright (Batman would later regret his behaviour). Only Booster Gold, another superhero and Kord's best friend, eventually decides to help complete the investigation, but before he can he is seriously injured by an explosive trap.

Maxwell Lord kills Blue Beetle. Art by Phil Jimenez.

Alone and unaided, Blue Beetle continues to follow the clues to Switzerland where he infiltrates the castle base of the Checkmate organization. There, he confronts Maxwell Lord, who is revealed to be using his Justice League files and Batman's satellite, Brother MK I, to keep an eye on the superhero community, which he considers a threat to the human race. After Beetle refuses to join Lord, Lord executes him with a fatal gunshot to the head.

== Crossovers ==
Countdown was bannered as a bridge to all four of the Crisis leadup titles, but featured each of them unevenly. The main plot was essentially an extended prologue to The OMAC Project. The events of Day of Vengeance are foreshadowed, when the Beetle confronted the wizard Shazam, but no particular hints about that title are made. The Rann-Thanagar War was mentioned on a single page, but seemed to already be underway in the story. The main characters of Villains United were featured in a single chapter of the book, but one that did not connect to the Blue Beetle storyline in any way.

== Collection ==
Countdown was reprinted as part of the trade paperback collection of The OMAC Project, published November 2005 (ISBN 1-4012-0837-1).
