= Dagar, Desert Hawk =

Dagar, the Desert Hawk
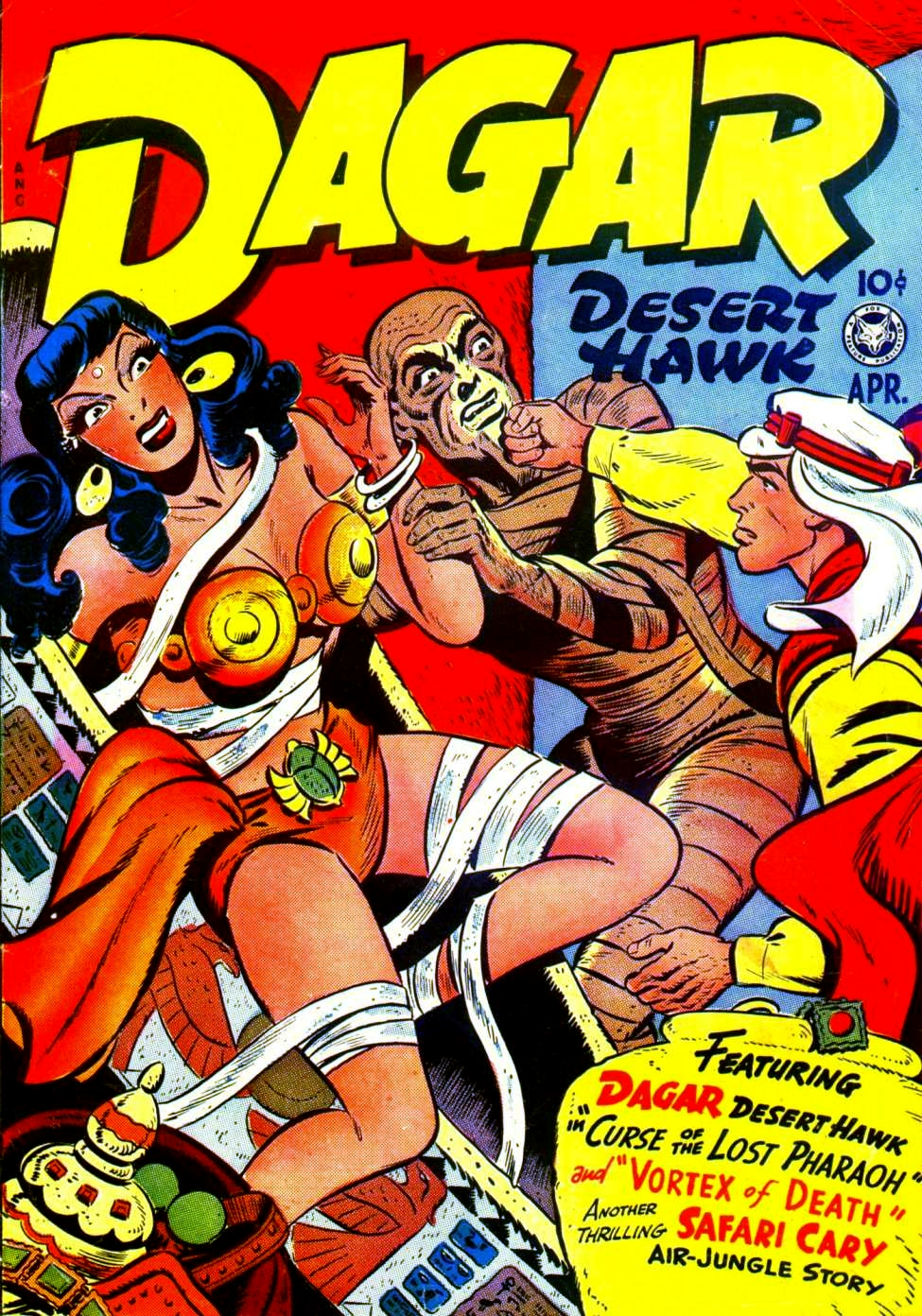
- Dagar on the cover of Dagar, Desert Hawk #15, art by Edmond Good.

Publication information
- Publisher: Fox Feature Syndicate
- First appearance: All Great Comics #13 (December 1947)
- Created by: Edmond Good (artist)

Dagar, the Desert Hawk is a fictional character appearing in comic books published by Fox Feature Syndicate. Dagar first appeared in All Great Comics #13 (December 1947), with pencils by Edmond Good.

Dagar was a desert adventurer, much like how Tarzan was a jungle adventurer. He usually appeared wearing a traditional Bedouin robe (in the style of Lawrence of Arabia). Dagar's romantic interest was the beautiful Ayesha. He fought Bedu raiders, ant-men, mad scientists and mummies.

After his first appearance, All Great Comics was renamed Dagar, Desert Hawk, starting with issue #14 (February 1948). The final issue was #23 (April 1949). Dagar made one last appearance in All Top Comics #18 (July 1949).
