= Everett M. Arnold =

American publisher

Busy Arnold
- "Busy" Arnold, circa 1940s
- Born: Everett M. Arnold; May 20, 1899 Providence, Rhode Island, U.S.
- Died: December 1974 (aged 75)
- Area: Publisher
- Notable works: Quality Comics

Everett M. Arnold (May 20, 1899 – December 1974), also known as Busy Arnold, was an American publisher and an early comic-book entrepreneur whose company Quality Comics published during the 1930s and 1940s period fans and historians call the Golden Age of Comic Books. He was also instrumental in the publishing arrangement that led to Will Eisner's newspaper Sunday-supplement comics series The Spirit.

== Early life and career ==
The Comics Magazine #1 (May 1936), one of the first comic books. Art by Vin Sullivan.

Growing up in Rhode Island, where his habit of talking in class earned him the admonishment "busybody" from teachers, and the subsequent nickname "Busy" from classmates, Everett M. Arnold graduated from Brown University with an economics degree in 1921, years later receiving the Brown Alumni Association's Brown Bear Award for service to his alma mater. He found work with the printing press manufacturer R. Hoe and Company, and later spent 12 years as the Eastern sales representative for New York City's Goss Printing Company. There he sold presses to Waterbury, Connecticut's Eastern Color Printing (future publisher of the first American comic book, Famous Funnies #1, May 1934), and to the McClure Syndicate in Baltimore, Maryland.

Circa 1930, either Arnold persuaded Buffalo, New York printer Walter Koessler to invest in a color plant in order to print comics, or vice versa (sources differ). In either event, Arnold became vice president of Koessler's Greater Buffalo Press and learned publishing as the company began printing a large number of color comic newspaper sections. In 1936, Arnold gave either financial or other, unspecified help to the New York City-based Comics Magazine Company, founded by John Mahon and Bill Cook, former employees of Major Malcolm Wheeler-Nicholson's National Allied Publications, the primary forerunner of DC Comics. The duo published the premiere issue of The Comics Magazine (May 1936), using inventory content from National Allied's submissions. The original features (as opposed to color comic strip reprints, as Famous Funnies published) included the Doctor Occult spin-off Dr. Mystic the Occult Detective (unrelated to the Mr. Mystic that later ran in newspapers), by future Superman creators Jerry Siegel and Joe Shuster. Other titles included Funny Pages, Funny Picture Stories, Detective Picture Stories and Keen Detective Funnies. Daniel R. Hanna Sr., publisher of Ohio's Cleveland News, printed the interiors, with Cleveland's Penton Press printing the covers and handling binding and shipping. But the company — which would evolve into Centaur Publications — would have no hit title.

== Quality and Connecticut ==
Crack Comics #5 (Sept. 1940), the first use of the "Quality Comic Group" logo (to right of "COMICS"). Cover art by Gill Fox.

The enterprising Arnold, deducing that Depression-era audiences wanted established, familiar comic strips for their hard-earned dimes, rather than untried original material, formed the suitably titled Comic Favorites, Inc. in collaboration with three newspaper syndicates: the McNaught Syndicate, the Frank J. Markey Syndicate, and Iowa's Register and Tribune Syndicate. Hiring cartoonist Rube Goldberg, who had just begun the strip Lala Palooza, and Goldberg's assistant, Johnny Devlin, Arnold in mid-1937 began publishing Feature Funnies, which mixed color reprints of leading comic strips (including Joe Palooka, Mickey Finn and Dixie Dugan) with a smattering of new features. His first office was at 389 Lexington Avenue in Manhattan.

The new material came from comics packagers, small studios that sprang up to produce comics on demand for publishers looking to enter the emerging comic-book field. Initially, Arnold bought from the quirkily named Harry "A" Chesler shop and from Eisner & Iger, headed by Will Eisner and Jerry Iger. He recalled in an interview for a 1972 history of comics,

...I believe the first feature I purchased from Eisner & Iger was "Espionage" in 1938 for Feature Comics (then Feature Funnies), and in 1939 I started buying material from them for Smash Comics, but it wasn't until 1940, when they supplied most of the pages for my five new titles as well as some material for Police Comics, that I became op customer with Eisner and Iger... [which] supplied all or most of the material for the first issues of Hit Comics, Crack Comics ["crack" as in "being at the top of one's form", like a crack sharpshooter], Uncle Sam and Military Comics, but until paper restrictions sent sales sky high [since publishers in business before World War II could obtain paper that newer publishers could not, hampering newer titles], these titles all sold very poorly. (If I hadn't been making big money on Feature and Smash Comics I would have gone broke.) So I dropped some of the Eisner and Iger material and tried to replace it with better features.

Arnold began developing an in-house staff, with George Brenner, writer-artist of comic books' first masked adventurer—the Comics Magazine Company's the Clock—among his first employees. In 1939, Arnold and the owners of the Register & Tribune Syndicate's parent company, brothers John Cowles, Sr. and Gardner Cowles, Jr.'s Cowles Media Company, bought out the McNaught and Markey interests. Arnold became 50% owner of the newly formed Comic Magazines, Inc., the corporate entity that would publish the Quality Comics line. That year Quality released Smash Comics #1 (Aug. 1939), the company's first comic book with exclusively new material.

By then, in February 1940, Arnold moved his offices from New York City to the Gurley Building in Stamford, Connecticut, with staffers now including editor Ed Cronin, Gill Fox, Plastic Man creator Jack Cole, Tony DiPreta, and Zoltan Szenics. "Since it was a long round trip for [acclaimed artist] Lou Fine (who was partially crippled) to make each day," Arnold said in the early 1970s, "I rented a studio for Lou in the Woodstock Tower in Tudor City, a large Manhattan high-rise complex". Quality Comics quickly grew to encompass such top-selling characters as Blackhawk, Doll Man, Plastic Man, Kid Eternity, and Uncle Sam, among others.

The name Quality Comics debuted on the cover of Crack Comics #5 (Sept. 1940; see image above). "Seemingly never an official publishing title," the Connecticut Historical Society noted, "the Quality Comics Group is a trademarked name (presumably taking its name from Stamford's nickname of 'the Quality City') encompassing Comic Favorites Inc., E.M. Arnold Publications, Smash Comics, and any other imprints owned by Arnold". A 1954 federal document noted that the Quality Romance Group, owned by Everett M. and Claire C. Arnold, with an office at 347 Madison Avenue, in New York City, published two titles as Arnold Publications, Inc., two titles as Comic Favorites, Inc., and 14 titles as Comic Magazines, Inc.

== The Spirit ==
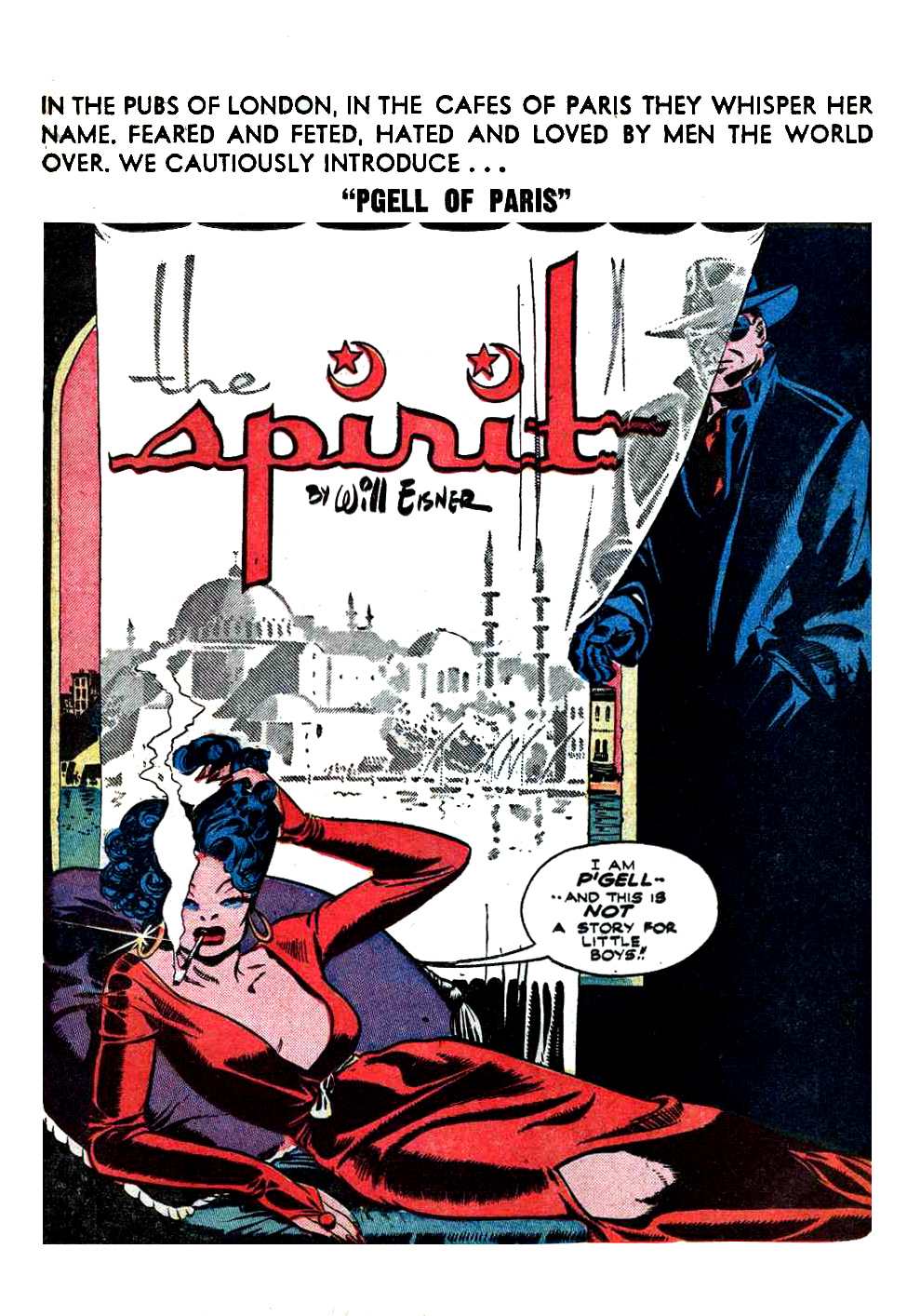
Will Eisner's "Spirit Section" appeared in 20 major newspapers, premiering June 2, 1940, and continuing through 1952.

In late 1939, Arnold orchestrated two roughly concurrent events. First, he made Will Eisner an offer to join Quality Comics' art staff. Eisner agreed to a complicated arrangement in which, Eisner recalled, "I regarded him as a partner and he thought of me as an employee". Whatever the specific business details, "The Eisner-Iger amalgam was dissolved, Iger buying out his partner's share of the organization", wrote historian Jim Steranko, who interviewed both Eisner and Arnold in the early 1970s. "In the bargain, Eisner took the shop's key men with him: Viscardi [also known as Nick Cardy], [Lou] Fine, Bob Powell, Chuck Cuidera, and others."

Second, Arnold explored an expansion into newspapers, with the idea of a Sunday-supplement comic-book section. Compiling a presentation piece with existing Quality Comics features, he contacted editors he knew from when he was vice president of Greater Buffalo Press. An editor of The Washington Star liked George Brenner's "The Clock", but not Brenner's art, and was favorably disposed toward a Lou Fine strip. Arnold, concerned over the meticulous Fine's slowness and his ability to meet deadlines, claimed it was Eisner's work. Arnold and Eisner had already been discussing a new feature, which would evolve into The Spirit.

In "late '39, just before Christmas time, 'Busy' came to me and said that the Sunday newspapers were looking for a way of getting into this comic book boom", Eisner recalled in 1979. In a 2004 interview, he elaborated on that meeting:

"Busy" invited me up for lunch one day and introduced me to Henry Martin[, sales manager of the Des Moines Register and Tribune Syndicate, who said, "The newspapers in this country, particularly the Sunday papers, are looking to compete with comics books, and they would like to get a comic-book insert into the newspapers". ... Martin asked if I could do it. ... It meant that I'd have to leave Eisner & Iger [which] was making money; we were very profitable at that time and things were going very well. A hard decision. Anyway, I agreed to do the Sunday comic book and we started discussing the deal[, which] was that we'd be partners in the 'Comic Book Section', as they called it at that time. And also, I would produce two other magazines in partnership with Arnold.

Eisner negotiated an agreement with the syndicate in which Arnold would copyright The Spirit, but, "Written down in the contract I had with 'Busy' Arnold — and this contract exists today as the basis for my copyright ownership — Arnold agreed that it was my property. They agreed that if we had a split-up in any way, the property would revert to me on that day that happened. My attorney went to 'Busy' Arnold and his family, and they all signed a release agreeing that would not pursue the question of ownership". This would include the eventual backup features, "Mr. Mystic" and "Lady Luck".

Martin of the Register and Tribune Syndicate signed a contract for a 16-page weekly section. After Arnold sold it to The Washington Star, The Baltimore Sun and The Philadelphia Record, the syndicate then acted as sales agent. "The Spirit Section", as it came to be colloquially called, eventually appeared in 20 major newspapers, premiering June 2, 1940, and continuing through 1952.

== Later career ==
=== Comics ===
Arnold's companies became highly successful during comics' World War II boomtime, the period fans and historians call the Golden Age of Comic Books. Helping Arnold were wartime paper-quota laws, under which publications begun before the war received far higher allotments than those begun afterward. Postwar, he kept up with changes in taste, renaming Military Comics as Modern Comics (beginning with issue #44, Nov. 1945), turning the superhero series Crack Comics into Crack Western (with #63, Nov. 1949) and changing Kid Eternity into Buccaneers (with #19, Jan. 1950). He bought out the Cowles' brothers interest for $140,000 in 1950; during their 13-year partnership, the Cowles had earned nearly $1.8 million on their original $1,000 investment.

Among his philanthropic efforts around this time, wealthy alumnus Arnold paid the Brown University tuition of college football player Joe Paterno, who attended from 1946 to 1950 before going on to become the College Football Hall of Fame coach of Penn State University.

During the 1950s, Quality Comics followed the prevailing comics trends away from superheroes to a wide range of genres. This included a single horror title, Web of Evil, that nonetheless made Arnold's otherwise wholesome company a target, like many other comics publishers, as a supposed factor in juvenile delinquency, as charged by Dr. Fredric Wertham's book Seduction of the Innocent and Congressional hearings led by Senator Estes Kefauver. Together with his staff's individual departures as time went on, Arnold in 1956 closed his company, selling most of its properties to DC Comics. The final Quality titles, including Heart Throbs #46, Robin Hood Tales #6, and Yanks in Battle #4, were cover-dated December 1956.

Comics historian Jim Steranko wrote that, "Arnold was, without a doubt, one of the most generous comic publishers. He was always very fair with the artists and believed in sharing wealth. He often delivered an extra bonus to his men in appreciation for their work and loyalty. He was, perhaps, the only publisher who paid his men what they were really worth."

=== Magazines ===
He started Arnold Magazines, Inc., edited by Alfred Grenet, with editorial offices at 303 Lexington Avenue in Manhattan. Mostly 35-cent digests, his publications included Homicide Detective Story Magazine, which ran stories by John D. MacDonald and William Campbell Gault. It later became Killers Mystery Story Magazine. Among its sister publications were Crime and Justice Detective Story Magazine (which included writers G.T. Fleming-Roberts, Robert Sidney Bowen, Harlan Ellison and Edward D. Hoch) and Terror Detective Story Magazine, each of which ran four issues from 1956 through March 1957. Blazing Guns, a Western digest, ran at least three issues during that time, as did Classic Photography, an innocuous (by modern standards) magazine of photo techniques plus shots of nude and semi-nude women; issue #3 (Spring 1957) featured Bunny Yeager on the cover. The Autumn and Fall 1956 issues were deemed "obscene" by the Post Office, and not applicable for second-class (standard magazine) mailing rates.

Arnold, by then in his late 60s, moved to Florida. He was living in Naples, Florida, at the time of his death in 1974.
