= Toni Blum =

American comic writer

- Born: Audrey Anthony Blum c. January 12, 1918 Pennsylvania, U.S.
- Died: 1972 or 1973 Pleasantville, New York, U.S.
- Area: Writer
- Pseudonyms: Audrey Anthony Blossert; Tony Boone; Anthony Bloom; Tony Blum; Toni Boone; Toni Boon; Toni Adams; Bob Anthony; Tony Adams; Anthony Lamb; Anthony Brooks; Jack Anthony; A. L. Allen; Tom Alexander; Tom Russell; Bjorn Tagens
- Awards: Bill Finger Award for Excellence in Comic Book Writing 2021 (posthumously)

Audrey Anthony Blum (c. January 12, 1918 – 1972 or 1973) was an American comic book writer active during the 1930s and 1940s "Golden Age of Comic Books", known for her work with Quality Comics and other publishers and as one of the first female comics professionals in what was then an almost entirely male industry.

Known professionally as Toni Blum, she was the daughter of comics artist Alex Blum and the wife of comics artist Bill Bossert. She was also known as Audrey Anthony Blossert.

== Biography ==
=== Early life and career ===
Toni Blum was born in Pennsylvania, the daughter of Jewish artists Alexander Anthony "Alex" Blum and Helen Blum. Together with her younger brother, the family lived in the Germantown section of Philadelphia. During the Great Depression, Alex Blum's career as a portrait painter evaporated, leading the family to move to New York City, New York, seeking work. In 1938, she became a staff writer at the Manhattan studio Eisner & Iger, one of the era's comics packagers that would supply comic-book content on demand to publishers testing the emerging medium. She lived at the time with her family on 91st or 92nd Street near Park Avenue in Manhattan.

Her father also worked at Eisner & Iger, joining the studio either before or after her. There, sometimes in collaboration with him, she wrote stories under a variety of pseudonyms, among them Tony Boone, Anthony Bloom, and Tony Blum, as well as Toni Boone, Toni Boon, Toni Adams and possibly Bob Anthony, and Tony Adams, Anthony Lamb, Anthony Brooks, and possibly Jack Anthony, A. L. Allen, Tom Alexander, Tom Russell, and Bjorn Tagens. She became best known, however, as Toni Blum, and was called that by her co-workers. Aside from comics writer-artist and company principal Will Eisner, Blum was the shop's only writer. Her future husband, Eisner & Iger artist Bill Bossert, recalled of her working method,

She'd write an outline, and she'd help [the artist] break it down page-by-page. Then she would get the pages back, and she would pencil in the actual dialogue on the page. Then the lettering man would letter the dialogue. ... [Y]ou'd be amazed at some of the guys who didn't have a clue what the storyline was supposed to be, even though she gave them a couple of paragraphs, and would give names of the good guy and the bad guy, and the police and the undercover agent, or whatever the story was. ... They would start out, and then she'd have to keep rewriting the whole thing because they made such a mess. She'd say, 'This is supposed to be on the fifth page and you have it on the second page. You're giving away the whole story in the beginning.' So she had to re-do the whole story as it went along.

Owing to her collection of pen names, historians are uncertain of her earliest comic-book scripts. Who's Who of American Comic Books, 1928-1999 lists her as writer, from 1936 to 1937, of the two-page feature "The Vikings", which ran in issues #1-19 (cover-dated Dec. 1935 - Dec. 1937) of one of the earliest comic books, National Allied Publications' New Comics (renamed New Adventure Comics with issue #7). Blum is also tentatively identified as the author of the two-page text fillers "Treasure Hunt" Parts 1 & 2 in Action Comics #15-16 (Aug.-Sept. 1939), bylined "Jack Anthony". That title's publisher, Detective Comics Inc., one of the firms that would coalesce to become DC Comics, was not known to use comics packagers for its content, however. Following a handful of other tentative credits, Blum's first confirmed work, bylined "Anthony Brooks", is the six-page "Vladim the Voodoo Master", starring Yarko the Great, Master Magician, in Fox Comics' Blue Beetle #1 (Winter 1939–40).

=== Pioneering female comics creator ===
Blum co-created numerous features for Eisner & Iger clients. In Quality Comics' National Comics #1 (July 1940) alone, she introduced the aviation strip "Prop Powers", with the possibly pseudonymous artist Clark Williams; "Sally O'Neil, Policewoman", with artist Chuck Mazoujian; and "Wonder Boy", with artist John Celardo. Through 1943, she scripted a large number of Quality Comics features at various times, including "Black Condor", "Dollman", "Kid Patrol", "Lion Boy", "The Ray", "The Red Bee", "Stormy Foster", and "Uncle Sam" She also wrote numerous text fillers both for Quality and for Fiction House, many of the latter bylined "Tom Alexander".

The only female employee of the shop, the "young, attractive, intelligent" aspiring playwright Blum briefly dated Eisner, who depicted their relationship in his semiautobiographical graphic novel The Dreamer, with Blum renamed Andrea Budd. She was treated respectfully in the otherwise all-male studio, save for one encounter involving artist George Tuska punching fellow artist Bob Powell over a remark the latter made regarding Blum. As publisher and historian Denis Kitchen wrote, "Tuska, like Eisner, had a crush on office mate Toni Blum but was too shy to make his move. The actual provocation that inflamed Tuska, Eisner privately said, was Powell's loud assertion that he 'could fuck [Toni Blum] anytime' he wanted. After decking Powell, Tuska stood over his prostrate coworker and in a voice Eisner described as Lon Chaney Jr. in Of Mice and Men said, 'You shouldn't ought to have said that, Bob.'"

Blum fell in love with another of the staff artists, Bill Bossert, marrying him sometime during World War II, and together eventually having three children.

Following Eisner's departure from Eisner & Iger to launch his Sunday-newspaper comic-book insert, "The Spirit Section", in 1940, Blum became ghost writer of its title feature "The Spirit" for a time in 1942, while Eisner did World War II U.S. military service. One source also lists her as a writer for a companion feature, "Lady Luck", in 1940. A different source includes her among the post-Eisner S. M. Iger Studio personnel in the 1940s who adapted literary novels and stories for Classics Illustrated comics, for which her father Alex Blum drew many issues.

=== Later life ===
After Bill Bossert's July 1945 return from the U.S. Army, where he had been a captain and a paratrooper during World War II, Bossert and Blum had a son, Tom, and a daughter, Jill, and moved to Pleasantville, New York, where Blum became a housewife and Bossert a graphic designer. They later had a second son, Robin. Blum developed breast cancer, surviving for five years and undergoing chemotherapy, and died in 1973, according to Bossert in an interview conducted in the late 2000s, or 1972, per Who's Who of American Comic Books, 1928-1999.

== Legacy ==
While a handful of women artists worked in comics during the 1930s and 1940s era collectors and fans call the Golden Age of Comic Books, Blum is among the only female comics writers of that era, along with Ruth Roche and writer-artist Tarpé Mills.

== Awards ==
Toni Blum was a posthumous recipient of the Bill Finger Award for Excellence in Comic Book Writing in 2021.

== See also ==
- List of women in comics
