= The Spirit (2008 film) =

Superhero film by Frank Miller

- Theatrical release poster
- Directed by: Frank Miller
- Screenplay by: Frank Miller
- Based on: The Spirit by Will Eisner
- Produced by: Deborah Del Prete; Gigi Pritzker; Michael E. Uslan
- Starring: Gabriel Macht; Eva Mendes; Sarah Paulson; Dan Lauria; Paz Vega; Scarlett Johansson; Samuel L. Jackson
- Cinematography: Bill Pope
- Edited by: Gregory Nussbaum
- Music by: David Newman
- Production companies: Odd Lot Entertainment; Lionsgate Films
- Distributed by: Lionsgate Films
- Release dates: December 17, 2008 (Chinese Theatre); December 25, 2008 (United States)
- Running time: 103 minutes
- Country: United States
- Language: English
- Budget: $60 million
- Box office: $39 million

The Spirit is a 2008 American neo-noir superhero film written and directed by Frank Miller, based on the comic series The Spirit by Will Eisner. Gabriel Macht stars in the title role, with Eva Mendes, Sarah Paulson, Dan Lauria, Paz Vega, Scarlett Johansson, and Samuel L. Jackson in supporting roles. It tells the story of a ghost-like superhero who defends Central City from the Octopus, who competes with the superhero's childhood friend Sand Saref for the Blood of Heracles in order to become immortal. The film was produced by Odd Lot Entertainment and Lionsgate Films, and distributed by Lionsgate.

The Spirit premiered on December 17, 2008, before releasing theatrically on December 25. The film received negative reviews, and was a commercial failure. It was later released on home media on April 14, 2009.

== Plot ==
Denny Colt, also known as "the Spirit", learns about a major case from Detective Sussman involving his nemesis, "the Octopus". The Spirit dons his costume and travels across rooftops, saving a woman before connecting with Officer Liebowitz. At the swampland, femme fatale, Sand Saref, rises from the water to shoot Sussman. The Spirit and Liebowitz find the wounded Sussman. Sand and her husband, Mahmoud, had earlier fled with chests they recovered from the water. While being shot at, Sand escaped, leaving one chest behind which was retrieved by Octopus. The Octopus beheads Liebowitz, and his cloned henchmen attack the Spirit. His accomplice, Silken Floss, flees with the chest as the two arch-nemeses fight.

The next morning, the Spirit is awakened by his lover, Dr. Ellen Dolan, daughter of Commissioner Eustace Dolan. He is undeterred by his gunshot wounds, which have fully healed. He notices a gold locket in Sussman's hand, which had been torn from Sand's neck. The locket contains pictures of a much-younger Colt and Sand, and had been his gift to her. Sand had become disenchanted with the city's corruption, following the death of her father, a police officer, and left for fifteen years. In a secret lair, the Octopus and Silken Floss discover their chest contains the Golden Fleece, not the Blood of Heracles, as expected. Sand and Mahmoud visit an underworld figure who sold them the location of the treasure, and it is implied he gave the location to the Octopus.

Commissioner Dolan calls The Spirit away to a case and relates Sand's history as one of the world's great jewel thieves. While arresting her, he reveals he knows she is looking for the Golden Fleece, and she shoves him through a window, which he survives. The Spirit receives a tip on the location of the Octopus's lair, but is captured while investigating. The Octopus reveals that his and Floss's experimentation led to the creation of an immortality serum. The Octopus first tested it on Colt's dead body. Colt was revived and earned the ire of Death for escaping her clutches. Eventually, the Octopus injected himself with the serum, but he needs the blood of the demigod Heracles to perfect the formula. The Spirit escapes by seducing assassin Plaster of Paris, who as a parting gift turns on The Octopus. When the Spirit mentions Sand's name, she stabs him out of spite.

After recovering, the Spirit stumbles to the city docks and collapses into the water where Lorelei, the Angel of Death, confronts him. He initially submits, but changes his mind after remembering the women he has known. As he swims to the surface, she vows to have him. At the projects, Sand, Floss, and their henchmen meet to exchange the Blood of Heracles for the Golden Fleece. Sand attempts to convince Floss to leave the Octopus before he kills her. Floss gains the upper hand and the Octopus asks Floss for the vase of blood. As the Spirit suddenly materializes, Floss drives off, unable to take a side.

The Octopus shoots a series of progressively larger guns at the Spirit, apparently killing him, but Dolan's SWAT team storms the area and opens fire. The Octopus is maimed. As he desperately tries to drink the Blood of Heracles, Sand shoots the vase. The Spirit rises, shown to be wearing a bullet-proof vest and blows up the Octopus with a grenade while Sand uses the Golden Fleece to protect them from the explosion.

The Spirit gives Sand her locket back. They kiss as Ellen looks on, feeling betrayed. The old flames bid each other goodbye and the Spirit convinces Dolan to release Sand in gratitude for helping to save the world. Nearby, Floss discovers one of the Octopus's severed fingers crawling towards her. She picks it up and departs with two of the clones. Meanwhile, the Spirit and Ellen make amends and embrace.

== Cast ==
- Gabriel Macht as Denny Colt / the Spirit: An ambitious and formerly eager young cop killed on the job who under mysterious circumstances is reborn as a masked crimefighter with an eye for the ladies. Determined to still keep his beloved city safe, he works with Central City's police force from the shadows.
  - Johnny Simmons as Young Denny Colt
- Samuel L. Jackson as The Octopus: A former coroner turned psychotic supervillain who plans to bring all of Central City to its knees and will kill without discretion anyone unlucky enough to stand in his way.
- Scarlett Johansson as Silken Floss: A femme fatale secretary and perversely innocent accomplice to the Octopus, only slightly saner than he is.
- Eva Mendes as Sand Saref: The Spirit's childhood sweetheart who perennially seduces and marries wealthy men, has them killed, and uses their money to fund criminal exploits in a constant pursuit of a life of the highest luxury and influence over the criminal underworld. She is also a tragic anti-heroine with her policeman father accidentally murdered causing her to have a hatred of police and Central City and break up with aspiring cop Denny Colt. Her portrayal in the film combines her backstory from the original comics with characteristics of another prominent femme fatale in the series, P'Gell.
  - Seychelle Gabriel as Young Sand Saref
- Sarah Paulson as Dr. Ellen Dolan: The police commissioner's daughter and a top surgeon who considers it her duty as the Spirit's current flame to keep him healthy and alive (much to her father's chagrin).
- Dan Lauria as Commissioner Eustace Dolan: The hard-boiled and commanding police commissioner of Central City and the Spirit's father figure.
- Stana Katic as Morgenstern: A spunky rookie officer and skilled sharpshooter who idolizes the Spirit and claims that Sand Saref suffers from Electra complex.
- Louis Lombardi as Phobos, Logos, Pathos, Ethos, Bulbos, Huevos and Rancheros, Mangos, Adios and Amigos, etc.: The Octopus's thuggish and moronic, yet highly resilient cloned henchmen.
- Jaime King as Lorelei: A phantasmic siren and the Angel of Death waiting to take the Spirit, who must continually force himself to resist her.
- Paz Vega as Plaster of Paris: A sexy French belly dancer and assassin in the employ of the Octopus, she wields tri-pronged throwing knives and a sword.
- Richard Portnow as Donenfeld: An underworld figure and fence of ancient artifacts that sold the map to the Blood of Heracles to Sand.
- Arthur the Cat as Himself: A cat that is the Spirit's animal companion.

Frank Miller and DC Comics president Paul Levitz also have cameo roles in the film where Miller portrays Officer Liebowitz while Levitz portrays Onlooker #3.

== Production ==
=== Development ===
In the 1970s, director William Friedkin obtained the film rights to The Spirit and contacted Will Eisner to write a script for him. Eisner declined but recommended Harlan Ellison, who wrote a two-hour live-action script for the filmmaker. Friedkin and Ellison afterward had an unrelated argument, and the project was abandoned. During the 1980s, Brad Bird, Jerry Rees, and producer Gary Kurtz attempted to get an animated adaptation off the ground, though studio executives praised the screenplay, they thought the film would be unmarketable, and this version was scrapped. A feature length television pilot based on The Spirit was made for American Broadcasting Company starring Sam J. Jones in 1987 that ABC ultimately passed on picking up for a full series due to a change in management. Eisner reportedly disliked the pilot saying of the experience that it "made my toes curl".

In 1994, producer Michael Uslan and executive producers Benjamin Melniker and Steven Maier subsequently obtained the rights for a live-action film adaptation. The producer promised Eisner that he would not permit anyone who "didn't get it" to work on the project. Two ideas pitched to Uslan were to put the Spirit in a costume and to have the Spirit be a resurrected dead man who possessed supernatural powers. Screenwriter John Turman, a comic book fan, expressed interest in writing the script.

In July 2004, financier Odd Lot Entertainment acquired the rights to the film. OddLot's producers Gigi Pritzker and Deborah Del Prete began a collaboration with Uslan, Melniker, and Maier working at Batfilm Productions, to adapt the story. Eisner, who was protective of the rights to his creations, said that he believed in the producers to faithfully adapt The Spirit. In April 2005, comic-book writer Jeph Loeb was hired to adapt The Spirit for the big screen, but the writer eventually left the project. Later in April, Uslan approached Frank Miller at Will Eisner's memorial service in New York City several weeks after Miller's Sin City was released in theaters, interested in initiating the adaptation technique with Miller's film for The Spirit. Miller had initially hesitated, doubting his skill in adapting The Spirit, but ultimately embraced his first solo project as writer-director. Miller described his decision-making:

The only thought in my mind was, "It's too big—I can't possibly do it." And I refused. And about three minutes later as I was at the doorway, I turned around and said, "Nobody else can touch this," and I agreed to the job on the spot.

In July 2006, the film trade press reported Miller would write and direct the film adaptation for The Spirit; Miller and the producers publicly announced this at the 2006 Comic-Con International in San Diego, California. Miller said that he was putting together a film treatment that included large parts of The Spirit strip panels. As Miller described the project, "I intend to be extremely faithful to the heart and soul of the material, but it won't be nostalgic. It will be much scarier than people expect". Miller filmed The Spirit using the same digital background technology that was used for Sin City and 300. The film would also copy specific shots from the comic, similar to Sin City.

In February 2007, Miller completed the first draft of the screenplay and began work on a second draft. Principal photography was initially slated to begin in late spring 2007. Miller also planned to begin filming Sin City 2 in spring 2009, and Uslan indicated that filming for The Spirit would begin before Miller started Sin City 2. Following the casting of Gabriel Macht as the Spirit in August 2007, filming was re-slated for the following October.

=== Casting ===
Miller held auditions for the title role, and Macht was cast in August 2007. Mendes told Miller that she wanted to work with him on The Spirit before she had even seen a script for the film.

Jackson was Miller's first choice for the role of the supervillain and was cast in May 2007. Jackson, Miller, and the costume designer developed elaborate costumes for the Octopus to wear; they are different for each of his scenes. They include a samurai robe complete with a wig, a full Nazi Schutzstaffel uniform, a Western duster-influenced outfit with an out-of-proportion cowboy hat, and a costume consisting of a karakul hat and a fur-lined coat influenced by 1970s blaxploitation pimps. When asked about the change from the Octopus being recognized in the comics by distinctive gloves, Jackson said, "It's just an opportunity to be larger than life to take the Octopus's theme of dressing the way he feels every day, or having a theme to his day to day life and making some sense with it. And hopefully, the audience will take the ride with us."

=== Filming ===
Filming began in October 2007, and took place at Albuquerque Studios in New Mexico. The Spirit was mainly filmed with Panavision's Genesis digital camera. High-speed photography was filmed with Vision Research's Phantom camera. The film's release was originally scheduled for January 16, 2009, but on May 6, 2008, it was announced that the release date would be moved up to December 25, 2008.

The film contains a number of references to Eisner collaborators and other comic book luminaries. These include "Feiffer Industrial Salt", alluding to The Spirit ghost writer Jules Feiffer; "Iger Avenue", named for Eisner & Iger partner S.M. "Jerry" Iger; "Ditko's Speedy Delivery", named for Steve Ditko, a comic book artist and writer; and the characters Donenfeld and Liebowitz, played by Richard Portnow and Frank Miller, respectively, who are named for two of DC Comics' founders, Harry Donenfeld and Jack Liebowitz.

=== Music ===
The Spirit

Film score by David Newman
- Released: December 23, 2008
- Genre: Classical
- Label: Silva Screen

David Newman chronology
Welcome Home Roscoe Jenkins	The Spirit	My Life in Ruins

Producer Deborah Del Prete said that Miller wanted "elements of the '40s jazz sound married with iconic heroic music and even a touch of the spaghetti western." The Spirit's mysterious Henry Mancini-like soundtrack was composed and conducted by David Newman.

It's Sand Saref (Eva Mendes) who has the most elaborate of all the themes because it's based on her relationship with Denny Colt when they were in their teens, well before he became the Spirit. Saref's music ultimately becomes the love theme of the movie. It's very romantic, almost old fashioned, especially when they finally kiss. Frank Miller and I talked about that scene quite a bit. He really wanted me to 'go for it'—to make their music as romantic as possible. In the end, the Spirit is like a modern day Don Juan, without the psychological ambivalence towards women. He truly loves every woman he meets. It's part of his makeup. He has a certain naiveté in this respect.

— David Newman

There is an eerie, wordless soprano for Lorelei (Jaime King) that is performed by Newman's 19-year-old daughter Diana, a vocal major at the University of Southern California.

Christina Aguilera sings a cover of the classic "Falling in Love Again" in the closing credits of The Spirit. The song dates to 1930, written by Frederick Hollander, with lyrics written by Sammy Lerner. The song was originally sung and popularized by Marlene Dietrich in the film The Blue Angel (1930) and has been covered by Billie Holiday (1940), Doris Day (1961), and Sammy Davis Jr. (1962).

The trailers for the film feature music from the I Choose Noise album by Hybrid.

Soundtrack track list:

1. "Spirit / Main Title"
2. "Lorelei 'Angel of Death'"
3. "Enter Silken Floss – Octopus Kicks"
4. "Just a Fight"
5. "You're An Accident"
6. "Spirit Reflects"
7. "Egg on My Face"
8. "Sand / Octopus Lair"
9. "I Am Sorely Disappointed"
10. "Spirit Finds Sand / Falling / Hung Up"
11. "Plaster of Paris Dance"
12. "Spirit and Plaster Run"
13. "Lorelei 'You Are Mine' / Spirit Wants"
14. "Stand Off / Spirit Just Keeps Coming"
15. "Shootout"
16. "Octopus Buys It"
17. "Spirit Kisses Sand"
18. "It's You I Love / She Is My City"

== Marketing and release ==
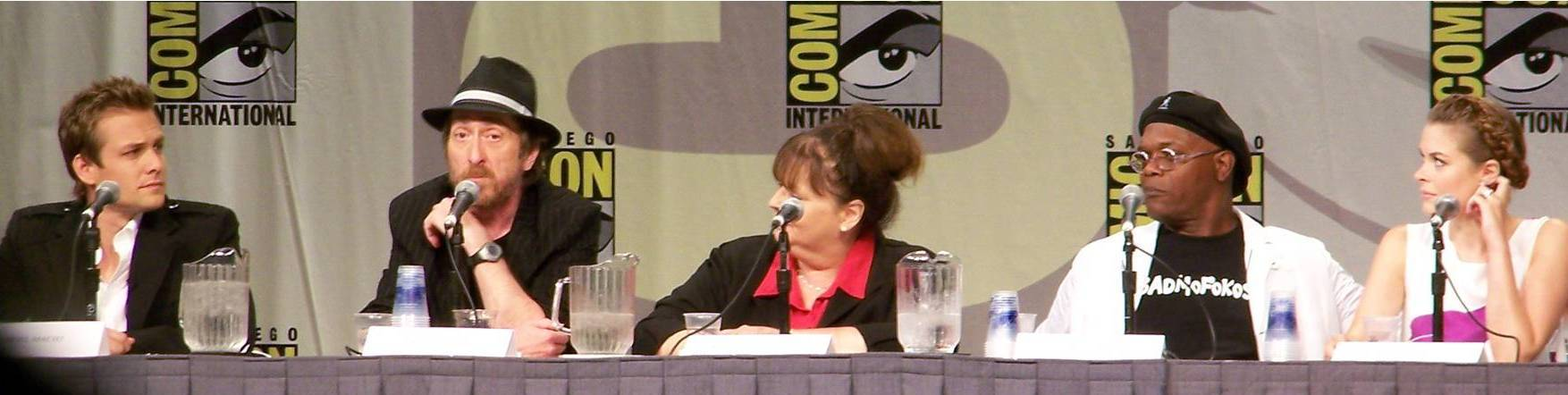
Gabriel Macht, Frank Miller, Deborah Del Prete, Samuel L. Jackson, and Jaime King at the 2008 Comic-Con promoting the film

At the New York Comic Con on February 24, 2007, director-screenwriter Frank Miller and producer Michael Uslan were scheduled to present a panel for The Spirit, though Miller was unable to attend due to recuperation from hip and leg injuries. Instead, Uslan, fellow producer F.J. DeSanto, and former The Spirit publisher Denis Kitchen presented a panel at which they described the history of the film and the film's progress.

Titan Books produced a making-of book, The Spirit: The Movie Visual Companion by Mark Cotta Vaz, featuring interviews with the cast and crew, photos, storyboards, and production art. It was released November 25, 2008. A second book, Frank Miller: The Spirit Storyboards, was announced for release on May 6, 2009, but was never released.

The film premiered on December 17, 2008, at Grauman's Chinese Theatre. The Spirit was released in theaters in the United States on Christmas Day the following week.

== Reception ==
=== Box office ===
Released in 2,509 theaters, The Spirit grossed $10.3 million in its opening four days, placing 9th in the box-office ranking for the weekend. The film grossed $19.8 million in the US and $18.6 million internationally for a worldwide total of $38.4 million. Variety estimated that the film's poor performance at the box office cost Odd Lot Entertainment tens of millions of dollars in losses, but Odd Lot Entertainment's CEO Gigi Pritzker denied rumors that Miller's other projects had been canceled.

=== Critical reception ===
On the review aggregator website Rotten Tomatoes, 14% of 114 critics' reviews are positive, with an average rating of 3.6/10. The website's consensus reads: "Though its visuals are unique, The Spirit's plot is almost incomprehensible, the dialogue is ludicrously mannered, and the characters are unmemorable." Metacritic, which uses a weighted average, assigned the film a score of 30 out of 100, based on 24 critics, indicating "generally unfavorable" reviews. Audiences polled by CinemaScore gave the film an average grade of "C−" on an A+ to F scale.

Roger Ebert of the Chicago Sun-Times gave the film one out of four stars and said, "There is not a trace of human emotion in it. To call the characters cardboard is to insult a useful packing material". Frank Lovece of Newsday, a one-time comic-book writer, found that "gorgeous cinematography and design can't mask the hollow core and bizarre ugliness of this mishandled comics adaptation", and noted that while Eisner's own Spirit was "an average-Joe [...] in a rumpled suit—a vulnerable but insouciant everyman in humanist fables", Miller's Spirit "now has a superpower—a healing factor. Eisner's own spirit must be spinning in its grave". Owen Gleiberman of Entertainment Weekly, found the movie a "ludicrously knowing and mannered noir pastiche, full of burnt-end romance and 'style', but robotic at its core".

Ken Hanke of Mountain Xpress observed, "The film may not move smoothly—Miller's too fond of 'just damn weird' digressions for that—but it does move and isn't hard to follow. Its screwiness is deliberate and it's all a matter of taste." A. O. Scott in The New York Times summed up, "To ask why anything happens in Frank Miller's sludgy, hyper-stylized adaptation of a fabled comic book series by Will Eisner may be an exercise in futility. The only halfway interesting question is why the thing exists at all."

In a positive review, Ricky Bentley of the Miami Herald said, "Macht manages to meld macho with melodrama to make the Spirit come to life." Chris Barsanti of Filmcritic.com stated, "It's a frankly gorgeous effect, liberated by the fact that Miller adapted freely from Eisner's panels—the two were longtime friends—to create an organic story instead of slavishly following the master's work", and calling it "one of the year's most refreshingly fun films."

In 2010, Empire magazine listed the film at No. 32 on their "Top 50 Worst Movies of All Time" list.

== Reboot ==
In January 2026, it was reported that Will Eisner's estate, run by his widow's nephew Carl Gropper and his wife Nancy, was looking to sell the entirety of Will Eisner's intellectual property including The Spirit with the sale also including a complete unpublished 72 page graphic novel Eisner had finished titled The Spirit Returns featuring The Spirit squaring off against a ruthless vigilante who has no qualms about killing. The Groppers voiced hope to find a buyer that could keep The Spirit in the public eye and voiced hope for either a live-action feature film or animated film noting that the 2008 attempt didn't make a lot of sense.
