= Ann Brewster =

American cartoonist (1918–2005)

- Born: Shirley Sonya Zweifach; November 20, 1918 New York, U.S.
- Died: July 9, 2005 (aged 86) New York City
- Areas: Cartoonist, Penciller, Inker
- Notable works: Sheena, Queen of the Jungle; Romance comics

Ann Brewster (November 20, 1918 – July 9, 2005) was an American cartoonist and illustrator during the Golden Age of comics. She provided art for many different publishers, including Ace Magazines, Fiction House, and Atlas Comics (later to become Marvel Comics). Brewster is most notable for illustrating romance comics. After a career as penciller and inker for comics, she transitioned to illustrating novels and children's magazines before retiring in 1980.

== Personal life ==
Ann Brewster was born Shirley Sonya Zweifach to Abraham Marks Zweifach and Anna Silverman on November 20, 1918. She spent part of her life in the Bronx borough of New York City before moving to Mount Vernon, in 1927. After graduating from Lincoln Elementary School of Mount Vernon, Brewster developed an interest in fashion design while a student at the Wilson Junior High School of Mount Vernon. Though she originally pursued a career in fashion design, her time at the Cooper Union art school ultimately led to a career in illustration. Her career spanned from 1941 to 1980. She never married nor had children. Ann Brewster died on July 9, 2005, in New York City.

Brewster's father, Abraham, owned a women's coats manufacturing factory. Brewster's brother, Ira Stanley Zweifach, collected rare books. He was also interested in the publishing industry. Ira went on to become a magazine photographer, followed by a career in publishing.

== Career ==
Ann Brewster spent forty years as an artist for comic books, magazines, and novels.

=== Comics ===
Throughout her career as a cartoonist, Brewster worked on many different comics for a variety of publishing houses. Her career began in Jack Binder's "Binder Comic Shop" in 1941. The Binder Comic Shop was responsible for supplying artwork to comic book publishers. It was while working at Binder Comic Shop where Brewster received her first credit as an artist in Samar for Quality Comics in 1941. In March 1942, Brewster created her first comic art for Fiction House's Sheena comics. She was the artist for 15 Sheena comics between 1942 and 1946.

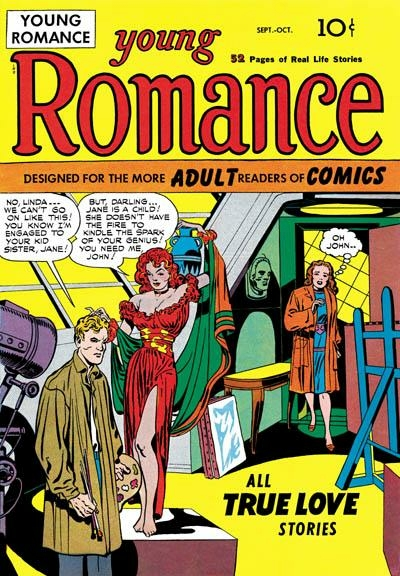
Young Romance #1 (1947) by Joe Simon and Jack Kirby: The first romance comic

In 1944, Brewster joined Jerry Iger's S. M. Iger Studio. The Iger Studio supplied work for larger publishing houses like Quality Comics, Holyoke and Gilberton. During this World War II era, Iger hired many female artists, including Brewster, which led to an influx of female characters written and drawn by female artists. While working for Iger, Brewster created art for Bulletman and Mr. Scarlet comics published by Fawcett. Bulletman and Mr. Scarlet were both superhero comics published during the Golden Age of comic books. Shortly after, Brewster became an inker on several more comics: Blackstone for Street & Smith, Rip Carson for Fiction House, and The Hawk, also published by Fiction House. She also created the art for issue #9 of Kitty Kelly Yankee Girl, wartime heroine. While part of the Iger Studio, Brewster was the artist for Gilberton's Classics Illustrated series. She worked with Robert Hayward Webb to produce the issue retelling Frankenstein by Mary Shelley, which was adapted for comics by Ruth A. Roche.

Brewster moved on to Ace Magazines in 1948. This comic book publisher's longest running series are made up of the romance comics created under their imprint Ace Periodicals. Among these lasting titles, Ann Brewster created art for Glamorous Romances, Love at First Sight, Love Experiences, and Real Love. In her seven years at Ace (1948-1955), Brewster was the artist behind 59 issues of Ace's romance comics.

In 1955, she was featured as the artist for several Young Romance comics. Young Romance, originally created by Jack Kirby and Joe Simon in 1947, is credited as the first romance comic. Brewster's art was used to create a number of covers for Kirby and Simon through the Prize Group, an imprint of Feature Publications, including Young Romance #77 and #79.

The 1950s was also spent creating comics for Timely/Atlas Comics romances. Between September 1949 and July 1958, Brewster was the artist for 74 issues of Atlas, now Marvel, Comics. Some of these titles include Love Tales and My Own Romance. In addition to romance, Brewster dabbled in Atlas' other genres, including sci-fi/horror comic Journey into Mystery and crime drama All-True Crime Cases. Journey into Mystery would become an important comic to Atlas, as it later introduced the Norse mythological god turned superhero, Thor. Brewster's comic art for "Foster's Fate!", part of Journey into Mystery issue #25, was reprinted in 2010 for Marvel Masterworks: Atlas Era Journey Into Mystery #3, both the Regular and Limited Variant Edition.

Brewster's final collection of comic publications was for Gilberton's The World Around Us series in 1961.

=== Other publications ===
The last two decades of Brewster's career featured her as an illustrator for various novels and magazines. Bible Stories to Read Aloud (1962), curated by Oscar Weigle, was Brewster's first children's novel illustration. Brewster also illustrated Animal Atlas of the World (1969) written by E.L. Jordan and published by the Hammond Map Company and The Dell Encyclopedia of Dogs (1974) distributed by Delacorte Press. Silver Wolf (1973) by Paige Dixon has a cover and illustrations by Brewster. Humpty Dumpty's Magazine for Little Children featured "The Nighthawks" by Helen Hoover and "The Nest Builders" by Hal Borland, both illustrated by Ann Brewster. What is a Mammal? (1975) published by Golden Look-Look Books and written by Jennifer W. Day was illustrated by Brewster as well.

Brewster retired from artistry in 1980.

=== Critical reception ===
World War II called for women to enter the job force and resulted in an increase of women in the comic book industry. The art of romance comics was often stylish and elegant. Women artists drew graceful, dramatic portrayals and close-ups of a woman's face. Among these artists was Ann Brewster.

Ann Brewster contributed to 36 comics for Fiction House, most while an artist for Jerry Iger's studio. Fiction House was more inclined to publishing comics about heroic women who were both strong in character and depicted in the popular "good girl" art style. The Iger Studio became synonymous with this "Good Girl Art", and Brewster's work depicted that of the sexy heroine. Brewster's work for Fiction House includes art for: Jane Martin, The Hawk, Rip Carson, Sheena, and ZX-5 Spies in Action.

In his commentary on the Classics Illustrated series, William B. Jones Jr. regarded Brewster's work in various Gilberton comics as clean yet detailed.

The 1973 New York Times article "Wolves Named Silver" comments on Brewster's work in Paige Dixon's Silver Wolf. The article discusses the wolf's rise in popularity and pop culture, including reviews of three novels published for young readers. Writer Jean Craighead George describes Silver Wolf as a dramatic rise-to-power adventure story featuring the clean-lined illustrations of Ann Brewster.

In his 1974 issue of Who's Who of American Comics, historian Hames Ware recorded artist Lou Cameron's account of Ann Brewster and her work. Cameron said that Brewster was hard working, dedicated, and faithful to her art. He described her style as being similar to "Hollywood actress Ann Miller ... if she had shopped at Klein's and if she wore her hair like ten years out of style". Cameron continues on to mention that Brewster was considered an excellent children's novel illustrator. The Who's Who of American Comics was a four part publication created in collaboration with Jerry Bails. Columbia University's Rare Book and Manuscript Library now houses the notes curated by Ware in his efforts to record the biographies of various artists.

== Notable works ==
=== Frankenstein (1945) ===
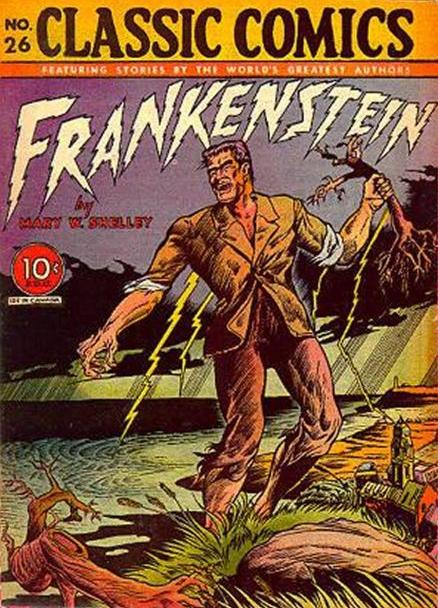
Classic Comics No. 26: Frankenstein cover art and illustrations by Ann Brewster and Robert Hayward Webb

Gilberton reprinted Frankenstein for Classics Illustrated nineteen times between 1945 and 1971. The cover was redesigned and repainted by artist Norman Saunders in 1957. The interior remained unchanged. The comic was originally printed under Classic Comics, but the title changed to Classics Illustrated in March 1947. Comic book writer Donald F. Glut identified Brewster's and Webb's adaptation of Frankenstein's monster as having dark gray coloring and bare feet to differentiate from Boris Karloff's version of the monster. Glut also notes that Brewster and Webb dressed the characters in clothing more closely related to the Regency style of the early 19th century, as opposed to remaining true to the original novel's 18th century style. This Classics Illustrated edition was more risqué, featuring sex and violence that was usually required to be rewritten or redrawn by censorship laws of the time. Brewster and Webb remained true to the "Good Girl" style of artists in Jerry Iger's employment. The Smithsonian National Museum of American History has a copy of Classic Comics No. 26: Frankenstein, though it is not currently on display.

=== Fiction House Comics ===
Trina Robbins, feminist comic historian and artist, applauds Fiction House for featuring a variety of female characters in numerous professions, from Jane Martin as war nurse turned aviatrix to sexy jungle queen Sheena. The women are always in charge and unafraid of conflict, never in need of a rescuer.

Sheena, Queen of the Jungle quickly became Fiction House's lead heroine and is credited as the first female super-heroine with her own titular comic. Though considered an important milestone for women in comics, Sheena's character is also largely problematic for her depictions of nonwhite characters. More recent versions of the character aim to rectify the character's past by avoiding the "jungle girl" stereotypes and focusing on environmental issues. Brewster was a featured artist in 15 issues of Sheena, the most she contributed for any one comic book title.
