= Louis Cazeneuve =

Argentine-born American comic-book artist (1908-1977)

- Born: Luis Cazeneuve; August 18, 1908 Argentina
- Died: August 1977 (aged 68–69) Queens, New York City, New York, U.S.
- Areas: Penciller, Inker
- Pseudonyms: Louis Cazeneuve, Charles Nicholas, Walter Frame
- Notable works: Aquaman, Red Raven

Luis "Louis" Cazeneuve (August 18, 1908 – August 1977) was an Argentine-born American comic-book artist. He is best known for co-creating the Marvel Comics character Red Raven, and for his prolific work on the DC Comics characters Aquaman, Shining Knight, the Boy Commandos and others during the 1940s period fans and historians call the Golden Age of Comic Books.

His brother, Arturo "Arthur" Cazeneuve (1919–1992), was also a Golden Age comic-book artist, and became an illustrator and assistant art director for the overseas edition of Time magazine in the 1970s and early 1980s.

== Biography ==
=== Early life and career ===
Louis Cazeneuve, in his native Argentina and under his given name Luis Cazeneuve, drew one of his country's first adventure comic strips, Quique, el Niño Pirata ("Quique, the Pirate Boy"), which appeared both daily and Sunday in the newspaper El Mundo, beginning in 1931 or 1934 (accounts differ). Cazeneuve also drew the adventure strips Aventuras de Caza del Pibe Palito ("Pibe Palito's Hunting Adventures") and Aventuras de Dos Argentinos en un País Salvaje ("Adventures of Two Argentines in a Wild Country") before emigrating to the United States in 1939.

He worked briefly at Eisner & Iger, one of the primary comic-book "packagers" that supplied outsourced comics on demand for publishers at the dawn of the new medium. Shortly thereafter, Cazeneuve, with his artist brother Arthur and Eisner & Iger colleague Pierce Rice, formed a studio that produced freelance art for a number of comics companies.

Cazeneuve's earliest work includes Fox Feature Syndicate's 1940 comic strip Blue Beetle, succeeding Jack Kirby under the house name Charles Nicholas. With writer Joe Simon, editor-in-chief of Marvel Comics predecessor Timely Comics, he co-created the character Red Raven — the first Timely/Marvel character to star in his own self-titled series, predating by several months Captain America Comics #1 (March 1941).

From 1940 to 1942, Cazeneuve contributed to a number of Fox titles, drawing the stories introducing the superheroic characters Samson (Samson #1, Fall 1940); the Eagle (Weird Comics #8, Nov. 1940); the Banshee (Fantastic Comics #21, Aug. 1941); and U.S. Jones (Wonderworld Comics #28, Aug. 1941), as well as the villainous protagonist Nagana, Queen of Evil (Fantastic Comics #22, Sept. 1941). Other Fox features for which he either supplied full art or did inking over penciler Pierce Rice, include "Captain Savage, Sea Rover", "Chen Chang" (in Mystery Men Comics), "D-13", "The Flame", "The Green Mask" (under the house name Walter Frame), and "Marga the Panther Woman".

Also during this time he did occasional work for Centaur Publications (the feature "Man of War"), Fawcett Comics ("Atom Blake"), Holyoke Publications ("Blue Beetle"), Lev Gleason Publications ("Dickie Dean"), and Harvey Comics, ( "Dr. Miracle", "Duke O'Dowd", "Robin Hood", and, in Pocket Comics, "Phantom Sphinx").

One source attributes the Fox character Spider Queen to the Cazeneuve brothers under the joint pseudonym Elsa Lesau.

=== DC Comics and Aquaman ===
More Fun Comics #83 (Sept. 1942): Aquaman communicating with sea life by an ancient Atlantean temple he uses as his lair. Art by Louis Cazeneuve.

It was at National Comics, the future DC Comics, that Cazeneuve did his most popular and prolific work during the Golden Age of Comics. He began on minor features, including "Bart Regan, Spy", in Detective Comics #61-63, 65-66, (March–May, July-Aug. 1942); "Three Aces", in Action Comics #47-63 (April 1942 - Aug. 1943); "TNT and Dyna-Mite", in Star Spangled Comics #10-23 (July 1942 - Aug. 1943); and "Radio Squad", in More Fun Comics #81-82 (July - Aug. 1942).

Cazeneuve then began the two features for which he became best known. He succeeded creator Creig Flessel on the modern-day Arthurian feature "Shining Knight", drawing the feature for nearly three years in Adventure Comics #73-101 (April 1942 - Jan. 1945). More prominently, he became the second artist of the enduring character Aquaman, succeeding artist co-creator Paul Norris to become the longest-running artist of the undersea hero's Golden Age adventures. Cazeneuve debuted on "Aquaman" in More Fun Comics #82 (Aug. 1942), and continued with the feature through issue #107 (Feb. 1946), and its subsequent move to Adventure Comics #103-117, 119-120, 124 (April 1946 - June 1947, Aug.-Sept. 1947, Jan. 1948).

He additionally drew the wartime "kid gang" feature "Boy Commandos" in World's Finest Comics #14-20 (Summer 1944 - Winter 1945/46), and penciled it in #24 (inked by George Klein). He inked two of their stories by co-creator and writer-penciler Jack Kirby in #21 (June 1947), and inked Curt Swan in #31 (Feb. 1949).

Other DC characters on which Cazeneuve worked during the Golden Age include the Crimson Avenger, Green Arrow, the Seven Soldiers of Victory, and the Old West gunslinger Vigilante. One generally authoritative source states that Cazeneuve was ghost-artist for Jack Kirby on some stories in Boy Commandos #6-7 (Spring-Summer 1944). Cazeneuve's other mid- to late Golden Age work included Feature Comics' "Yank and Doodle", and Harvey Comics' "Boy Heroes", "Captain Freedom", and "Shock Gibson".

His last known credited DC Comics work is penciling and inking the six-page Aquaman story "The Sea Serpent" in Adventure Comics #124 (Jan. 1948). He then worked primarily for Fawcett Comics, starting with Whiz Comics #103 (Nov. 1948). Cazeneuve's last known credited comics work is penciling and inking the seven-page Western feature "Golden Arrow" in Whiz Comics #107 (March 1949).

== Later life ==
At the time of his death he was living in the Jackson Heights / Flushing area of the New York City borough of Queens.
