= Gabriel Macht =

American actor (born 1972)

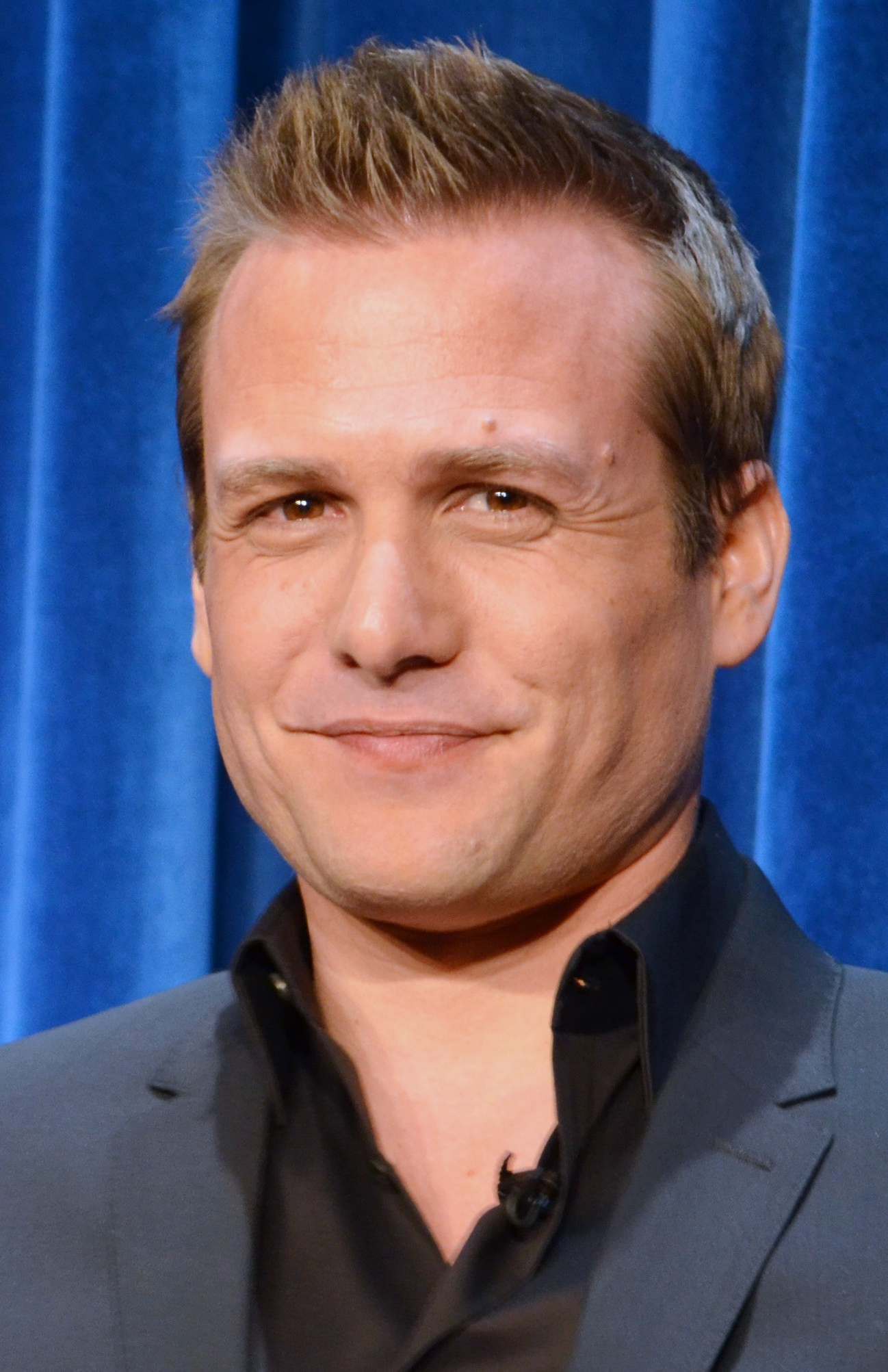
- Macht in 2013
- Born: Gabriel Swann Macht; January 22, 1972 (age 54); New York City, U.S.
- Other name: Gabriel Swann
- Education: Carnegie Mellon University (BFA)
- Occupation: Actor
- Years active: 1980–present
- Spouse: Jacinda Barrett (m. 2004)
- Children: 2
- Father: Stephen Macht
- Macht's voice from a 2016 interview

Gabriel Swann Macht (born January 22, 1972) is an American actor, widely known for his role as Harvey Specter in the USA Network series Suits (2011–2019).

== Early life ==
Macht was born in the Bronx, New York City. He is the son of Suzanne Victoria Pulier, a museum curator and archivist, and actor Stephen Macht. He has three siblings: Jesse, a musician (who appeared on The Next Great American Band); Ari Serbin; and Julie. His family is Jewish. Macht was raised in California from the age of five.

After graduating from Beverly Hills High School, he attended Carnegie Mellon College of Fine Arts, where he graduated in 1994. During his time at Carnegie Mellon, he became a member of the Delta Upsilon fraternity.

== Career ==
Macht was nominated for the Best Young Motion Picture Actor Award after playing his first role at age 8 in the film Why Would I Lie? under the stage name Gabriel Swann.

He has appeared in many film and television roles including A Love Song for Bobby Long, The Good Shepherd, Because I Said So, The Recruit, and Archangel. For the 2001 film Behind Enemy Lines, Macht spent a week at sea filming on the flight deck, corridors, and hangar bay #3 of the USS Carl Vinson. Macht played the title role in Frank Miller's 2008 adaptation of Will Eisner's comic creation The Spirit. Although the film was a failure upon theatrical release, the film and Macht gained a cult following.

In July 2010, it was announced that Macht had signed on to star in the USA Network legal drama series Suits, which was known under the working title A Legal Mind. The series ran for nine seasons and 134 episodes, with Macht appearing in all of them. Macht began receiving co-producer credit during season 3. In 2014, 2015, 2016, and 2019, his father, Stephen Macht, guest-starred with him as Henry Gerard, an ethics professor from Harvard University.

Gabriel had a recurring role in Suits LA, a 2025 spin-off of Suits.

== Personal life ==
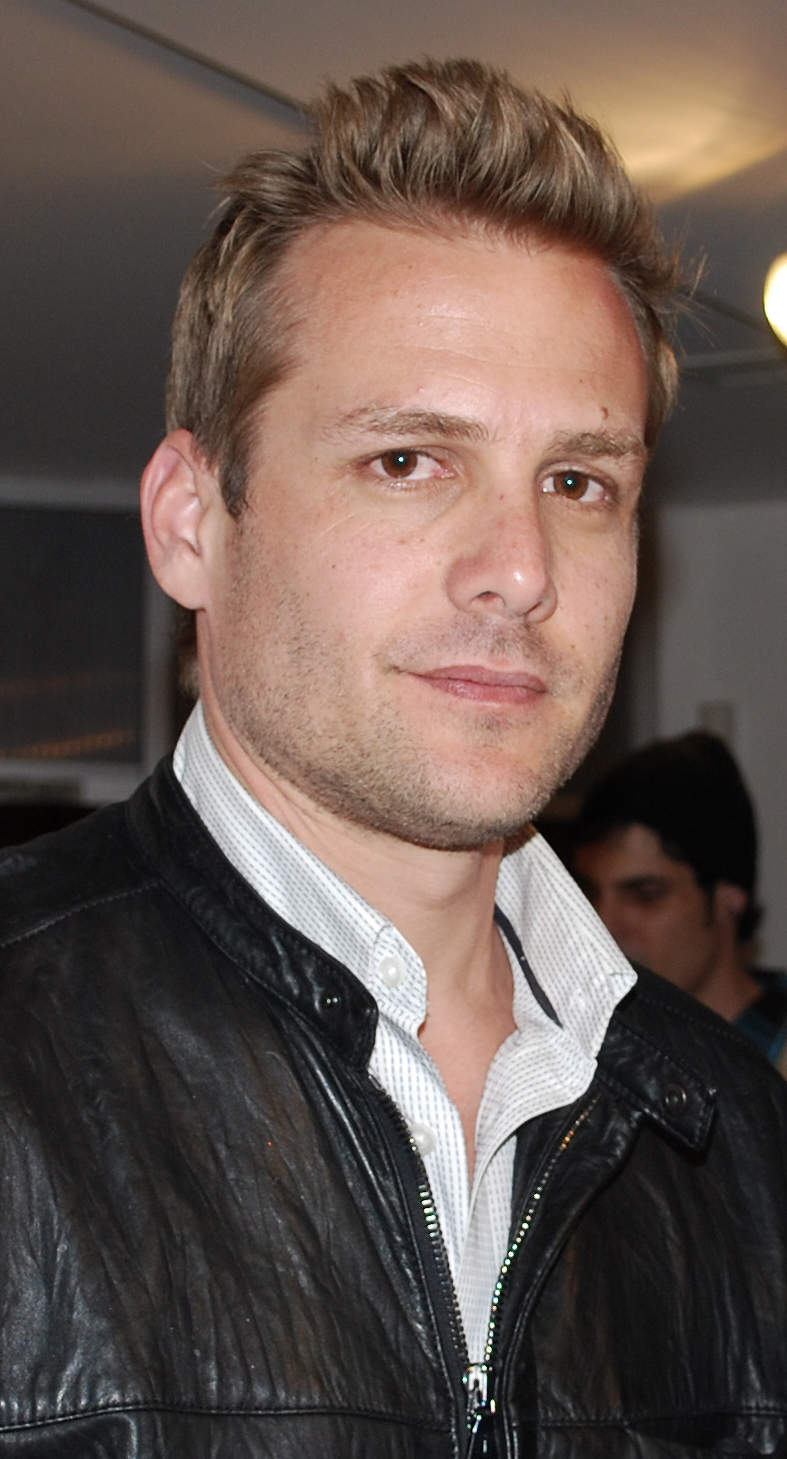
Macht in 2009

Macht married Australian-born actress Jacinda Barrett in 2004. The couple's first child was born in August 2007 in Los Angeles. They had a second child in February 2014. He and his family planned to leave the United States after Suits ended in 2019 but faced delays due to the COVID-19 pandemic; they had left by 2025.

Macht has been friends with his Suits co-star Sarah Rafferty since they met in 1993 at the Williamstown Theatre Festival.

Macht is also vegetarian, being an outspoken advocate for environmental care.

== Filmography ==
=== Film ===
Year	Title	Role	Notes
1980	Why Would I Lie?	Jorge	Credited as Gabriel Swann; Nominated—Young Artist Awards for Best Young Motion Picture Actor
1998	The Object of My Affection	Steve Casillo	
1998	The Adventures of Sebastian Cole	Troy	
1999	Simply Irresistible	Charlie	
2000	The Bookie's Lament	Mickey	Short film
2000	101 Ways (The Things a Girl Will Do to Keep Her Volvo)	Dirk	
2001	American Outlaws	Frank James	
2001	Behind Enemy Lines	Naval Aviator Lieutenant Jeremy "Smoke" Stackhouse	
2002	Bad Company	CIA Agent Seale	
2003	The Recruit	CIA Agent Zack	
2003	Grand Theft Parsons	Gram Parsons	
2004	A Love Song for Bobby Long	Lawson Pines	
2006	The Good Shepherd	John Russell Jr.	Berlin International Film Festival for Outstanding Artistic Contribution
2007	Because I Said So	Johnny Dresden	
2008	The Spirit	Denny Colt / The Spirit	
2009	Middle Men	Buck Dolby	
2009	Whiteout	UN Security Agent Robert Pryce	
2009	One Way to Valhalla	Bo Durant	
2010	Love & Other Drugs	Trey Hannigan	
2011	S.W.A.T.: Firefight	Sergeant Paul Cutler	Direct-to-video film
2011	A Bag of Hammers	Wyatt	
2013	Breaking at the Edge	Detective Williams	

=== Television ===
Year	Title	Role	Notes
1991	Beverly Hills, 90210	Tal Weaver	Episode: "Leading from the Heart"
1995	Follow the River	Johnny Draper	TV movie
1997	Spin City	The Naked Guy	Episode: "Snowbound"
1998	Sex and the City	Barkley	Episode: "Models and Mortals"
1999	Wasteland	Luke	Episode: "Best Laid Plans"
2000	The Audrey Hepburn Story	William Holden	TV movie
2000	The Others	Dr. Mark Gabriel	Main role
2005	Numbers	Don Eppes	Episode: unaired pilot
2005	Archangel	R.J. O'Brian	Miniseries
2011–2019	Suits	Harvey Specter	Main role
2019	Pearson	Harvey Specter	Episode: "The Former City Attorney"
2024	81st Golden Globe Awards	Himself / Presenter	Television special
2025	Suits LA	Harvey Specter	Guest Role, 3 episodes

=== Other credits ===
Year	Title	Role	Notes
2000	The Bookie's Lament	Producer	Short film
2013–2019	Suits	Co-executive producer, producer and co-producer	108 episodes
2015–2019	Suits	Director	4 episodes
