= Octopus (comics) =

Publication information
- First appearance: "The Postage Stamp" (14 July 1946)
- Created by: Will Eisner

Octopus is a supervillain from the comic book The Spirit by cartoonist Will Eisner. He first appeared in The Spirit on July 14, 1946, and became the primary nemesis in later stories.

== Fictional character biography ==
The Octopus is a master of disguise, whose ability to seamlessly transform his appearance makes him a formidable foe, one who can infiltrate any setting or situation undetected. The Octopus has never showed his face in the stories, but readers could always identify the character by the distinctive purple gloves he always wore.

An epic fight between the Octopus and The Spirit left Denny Colt temporarily blind.

== Appearances ==
- 14 July 1946 – "The Postage Stamp"
- 17 November 1946 – "Return to Caramba"
- 1 December 1946 – "The Portier Fortune"
- 6 July 1947 – "Wanted – Mortimer J. Titmouse"
- 10 August 1947 – "Sign of The Octopus" aka "Klink Versus The Octopus"
- 17 August 1947 – "The Picnic"
- 24 August 1947 – "Showdown with The Octopus"
- 28 December 1947 – "Umbrella Handles"
- 25 January 1948 – "Montabaldo"
- 1 February 1948 – "El Espirito"
- 1 August 1948 – "The Eisner Travel Agency"
- 31 October 1948 – "Hallowe'en Spirit"
- 5 December 1948 – "Stop the Plot"
- 26 December 1948 – "Will Eisner's Almanack" (cameo)
- 4 February 1951 – "Showdown with The Octopus" (reprint)
- 11 February 1951 – "Octopus Back in U.S.A."
- 18 February 1951 – "To The Spirit with Love"
- 25 February 1951 – "The Portier Fortune" (revised reprint)
- 18 March 1951 – "Darling Unmasks The Octopus"
- 15 July 1951 – "Heat" (cameo)
- 22 July 1951 – "Hospital Zone – Quiet"
- 25 November 1951 – "I Hate The Spirit Because Contest" aka "The League of Liars" (cameo)

== Film ==
On July 19, 2006, The Hollywood Reporter reported that comic book writer/artist Frank Miller would write and direct the feature film adaptation of The Spirit with Samuel L. Jackson as the Octopus. Unlike the comics his face is seen in the film, depicted with eight "prison tears" under his eyes like octopus tentacles; he brags to have "eight of everything". In another departure from the comic, he holds a love of powerful firearms, including two Desert Eagles, two miniguns, two .500 S&W Magnums, two Sawed-off shotguns, and a pair of four-barreled shotguns. He also wears a series of outlandish costumes such as a long fur coat and hat inspired by blaxploitation films and Russians, a Nazi uniform, and a samurai robe and hairpiece inspired by classic kung-fu movies. The film combines elements of Dr. Cobra from The Spirit comics with the Octopus in that he is revealed to have been responsible for the Spirit's resurrection and immortality thanks to a regenerative formula he invented and injected himself with as well after succeeding. The Octopus is served by Silken Floss and a group of cloned henchmen (all portrayed by Louis Lombardi). His quest in the film is to get his hands on the Blood of Heracles to drink and become a god. Following a fight with the Spirit, the Octopus escapes but ends up with Jason's Golden Fleece desired by Sand Saref, now with the blood. After going to desperate measures trying to find Sand and kill the Spirit, the Octopus hires a beautiful assassin, Plaster of Paris, to take down his nemesis. At the end of the film, the Octopus is finally defeated in a manner similar to his demise in the comic, being blown up by a grenade. However, his severed finger is found by Silken Floss and two of his cloned henchmen, implying he may return.

== Project Superpowers ==
The Octopus is mentioned in Alex Ross and Jim Krueger's Project Superpowers series. In that series he has supposedly been killed by The Flame, and his criminal empire is now run by his widow.
