= Greater Buffalo Press =

Greater Buffalo Press was founded by Walter Koessler (b. 1901, d. 1969), and his brother Kenneth, in Buffalo, New York in 1926 with the support of Everett M. "Busy" Arnold. The Koessler brothers were children of German immigrants who owned a mattress-stuffing business. Walter was a gifted athlete who graduated from Canisius College in 1922 after earning nine varsity letters in football, basketball and baseball. He was a major contributor to the sports programs at his alma mater in the 1960s, and the J. W. Koessler Athletic Center (completed in 1968) was named in his honor.

Greater Buffalo Press (GBP) developed and improved web-fed four color letterpress web technology, which was used to print color comic supplements inserted in Sunday newspapers, and color advertising inserts for daily and weekend newspapers. In four-color letterpress web printing, long rolls of newsprint are fed to the press in sequence, into four units, one for each color. The ability to align the units (and hence the printing plates) longitudinally and laterally is critical to quality control, as any misalignment results in color gaps, or colors bleeding to spaces they were not intended to cover. Its principal competitor was Waterbury, Connecticut's Eastern Color Printing.

In 1942 GBP established a sales office in New York City, at the recently completed Lincoln Building at 60 E 42nd Street, and hired Bob Lalor as Vice President for Sales. By the 1950s, GBP had established a dominant position in the market for Sunday comic and color supplement printing, with several facilities in western New York State, and printing plants in Wilkes-Barre, PA, Sylacauga, AL and Lufkin, TX. One of the sales representatives was Leonard Hershiser, father of future Cy Young Award-winning pitcher Orel Hershiser.

Following its acquisition in 1955 of International Color Printing Co., which brought its market share to 75% nationally and over 90% for the east coast market, it was charged by the United States Department of Justice with violation of Section 7 of the Clayton Act. GBP actively opposed the Justice Department, claiming the "failing company defense", which allows a competitor to acquire a firm that is facing grave financial difficulties even if the acquisition will reduce competition. This defense is generally tolerated as an antitrust law anomaly that sacrifices economic goals. The case finally reached the US District Court for the Western District of NY in 1970, one year after Walter Koessler's death and three years after Bob Lalor's, and after a full trial the District Court dismissed the complaint against GBP. The decision was appealed by the Government directly to the US Supreme Court under Section 2 of the Expediting Act, as amended, 32 Stat. 823, 15 U.S.C. 29. The Supreme Court, in an opinion by Chief Justice William O. Douglas, reversed the judgment below and remanded the case to the District Court. United States v. Greater Buffalo Press, 402 U.S. 549 (1971). Douglas pointed out that the "threat that newspaper customers will do their own printing is of course a factor in the competitive situation. But, according to the record, color comic supplement printing requires exacting mechanical techniques performed by specially trained personnel, and independent printers specializing in supplement printing and handling a high volume of business can produce a high quality product more economically than most newspapers."

By the late 1960s improvements in offset printing technology were permitting competitive entry by offset printing shops, and the divestitures recommended by the Supreme Court were never mandated. GBP was sold to Sullivan Graphics, an offset printing concern based in Brentwood, TN, in 1989. Sullivan Graphics changed its name to American Color Graphics in 1997. On July 15, 2008, American Color Graphics, Inc filed a voluntary petition for reorganization under Chapter 11 in the U.S. Bankruptcy Court in the District of Delaware. The confirmation order for the plan came from the U.S. Bankruptcy Court on or about August 27, 2008 and contemplates that American Color Graphics will merge with Vertis Communications, which also filed a pre-packaged reorganization plan on July 15 to implement the merger.

== Sources ==
http://caselaw.lp.findlaw.com/cgi-bin/getcase.pl?court=US&vol=402&invol=549&friend=nytimes

https://web.archive.org/web/20080820203948/http://www.utexas.edu/law/journals/tlr/abstracts/Volume%2063/Campbell.htm

http://investing.businessweek.com/businessweek/research/stocks/private/snapshot.asp?privcapId=3544913

http://www.bizjournals.com/nashville/stories/2008/08/25/daily45.html
