= Ellen Dolan (character) =

Dr. Ellen Dolan

Publication information
- First appearance: "The Return of Dr. Cobra" (June 9, 1940)
- Created by: Will Eisner

Dr. Ellen Dolan is a fictional character from the comic book The Spirit, by cartoonist Will Eisner. She first appeared in The Spirit in March 1944. Ellen is the daughter of Police Commissioner Eustace Dolan.

== Origin ==
Ellen Dolan first appeared in the second Spirit tale, dated June 9, 1940. The Spirit literally bumped into her and her fiancé, Homer Creep, whilst sharing a taxi which is being driven by Ebony White. In this story Ellen was still in college while the two went to visit her father, Commissioner Dolan. She asked her father if she could look through the mental ward to see some actual cases in preparation for an upcoming Psychology exam she had.

As she and Homer were looking at the different patients, Dr. Cobra (who was recently apprehended thanks to The Spirit) got their attention. He claimed to be a great scientist and the police were always arresting him just as he was about to complete a major experiment. He asked them to have pity and help him escape. The naive Ellen agreed to help him, not realizing what a danger he actually was. Dr. Cobra had some men waiting for him outside and they quickly made way to one of his hideouts.

When the Commissioner realized his daughter was missing, he put his men on the case to search for her. The Spirit was listening in and agreed to help search for her. Forcing a thug to tell them where Dr. Cobra's hideout was, the Spirit was able to defeat Dr. Cobra again and save Ellen and Homer.

Ellen played a prominent role amongst The Spirit, a comic filled with female characters.

The Commissioner invited the Spirit to a dinner in honor of Ellen's announcement of becoming engaged to Homer. The Spirit decided to give her a gift. He gave her a make-over (which simply involved removing her glasses and loosening her hair). Homer was amazed at her hidden beauty. The Spirit then claimed his reward for saving Ellen, a reward that consisted of a passionate kiss. That kiss was enough to make Ellen reconsider her engagement.

As Ellen's character developed, she soon became fixated with winning the heart of the Spirit. She would cause situations that required the Spirit to save her in order to attract his attention.

From becoming someone who is prone to fainting when confronted with murder or monsters, Ellen becomes more inquisitive - and it is more likely that she will be the one doing the punching rather than being knocked out herself. She became more forthright and it was not atypical for her to tie up the Spirit or have a downright blazing argument with him if it would help her. And despite the Spirit's hesitations to commit, their relationship developed into a strong one over the years. On many occasions while lapsing into unconsciousness he would mutter "Ellen... " much to her delight and the annoyance of her competition.

In the IDW republishing of The Spirit Ellen is portrayed as a councilwoman of the city However, up until 1950 Ellen's role was as a supporting character; she rarely got the chance to have a story to herself, unlike her father and the Spirit's co-stars (Officer Klink, Ebony, Sammy, etc.), who occasionally became the strip's center. But, with the November 12, 1950 section, Ellen finds herself becoming a candidate for mayor of Central City.

After appearing in successful interviews on television and radio for her candidacy, The Spirit is furious and demands that she withdraws - of course this prompts Ellen to put even more effort into becoming mayor, with such comments as, "Most men practice equality like a little boy practicing on the piano, one hour a day and then forget all about it!" The Spirit goes off to support her nearest rival, Mike Poltax, on the Prosperity Party ticket, but it looks unlikely that Poltax will win. To help matters, Poltax arranges for Ellen to be kidnapped, but the Spirit finds out and calls the police before he is himself shot. Recovering in a hospital with Ellen by his bedside, The Spirit learns that Ellen has won by a landslide and is now mayor. It made no difference to their relationship, and Ellen did quite well at the job. In the IDW republishing of The Spirit she is now a councilwoman for the city

== Skills and personality ==
Although Ellen is typically pictured as the helpless female victim, she maintains many talents as would be found in the daughter of a career policeman. She is well trained in jujitsu and can knock out a full-grown man with her patented right hook. She is also a crack markswoman, although she rarely carries a gun. Her skill with tactics and research have aided both her father and the Spirit on many occasions. She likewise has a natural political acumen which eventually leads to her becoming mayor of Central City. While she shows a good streetwise sense, she has the tradition of carrying her emotions to extreme limits. Devoted to the Spirit, she will turn her head to another handsome face if her hero shows distance. Her frailties include an inclination to gossip and breaking into tears when she feels she's "lost" a confrontation, romantic or otherwise.

== In other media ==
Sarah Paulson as Ellen Dolan in The Spirit (2008).

Ellen appears in the 1987 Spirit TV film, played by Nana Visitor.

The feature film The Spirit, written and directed by comic book writer/artist Frank Miller, was released by Lionsgate on December 25, 2008.

Sarah Paulson is cast as Dr. Ellen Dolan, a top surgeon and the Police Commissioner's daughter. She is the only girl around tough enough to keep The Spirit healthy and alive. The romantic undercurrent between Ellen and the Spirit is strong in the movie, but frequently tested due to the adoration that many women feel for the Spirit. In the film, Ellen was romantically involved with Denny Colt prior to his death, and still believes that he is deceased.
