= Eisner & Iger =

Comic book packager

Eisner and Iger Studio
- Trade name: Syndicated Features Corporation
- Type: Comics studio
- Founded: late 1936/early 1937
- Founders: Will Eisner; Jerry Iger
- Defunct: late 1939/early 1940
- Successor: S. M. Iger Studio
- Headquarters: New York City, United States
- Key people: Ruth Roche
- Products: Comics for Editors Press Service, Jumbo Comics #1 (Fiction House), Fox Comics, Quality Comics
- Services: Comics packaging
- Members: Jack Kirby, Bob Kane, Lou Fine, Bernard Baily, Dick Briefer, Bob Powell, Toni Blum

Eisner & Iger was a comic book packager that produced comics on demand for publishers entering the new medium during the late-1930s and 1940s, a period fans and historians call the Golden Age of Comic Books. Founded by Will Eisner and Jerry Iger, many of comic books' most significant creators, including Jack Kirby, entered the field through its doors. Eisner & Iger existed from 1936 to 1939.

The company, formally titled the Eisner and Iger Studio, was also known as Syndicated Features Corporation. Eisner, in a 1997 interview, referred to the company as both "Eisner & Iger" and the "Art Syndication Company". In addition to comic books, the company also sold color comic strips, such as Adventures of the Red Mask and Pop's Night Out, to newspapers.

After Eisner left in late 1939/early 1940, Iger would continue to package comics as the S. M. Iger Studio, eventually bringing on a new partner, Ruth Roche. The S. M. Iger Studio operated through 1961.

== Origin ==
Eisner & Iger was formed to service the emerging market for American comic books, which had originated in the early 1930s as tabloid-sized magazines that reprinted newspaper comic strips, adding color to black-and-white daily comics. By 1935, sporadic new material was beginning to be created for them. One such seminal comic book, Henle Publications' Wow, What a Magazine! was published by John Henle and edited by Samuel Maxwell "Jerry" Iger, a former cartoonist. Wow, which folded after issue No. 4 (Nov. 1936), brought Iger together with a 19-year-old Will Eisner – the future creator of The Spirit and some of the earliest and most influential graphic novels – who wrote and drew the adventure feature "Scott Dalton", the pirate feature "The Flame", and the secret agent feature "Harry Karry" for Wow.

The origin of the Eisner and Iger Studio has been recounted by its in highly different ways, (Note: Gerard Jones' Men of Tomorrow: Geeks, Gangsters and the Birth of the Comic Book favors the Eisner account. Jim Steranko's The Steranko History of Comics 2 gives an Eisner-like account with different details.) each given below, in alphabetical order.

=== Will Eisner account ===
According to Eisner, the demise of Wow prompted him to suggest that he and the out-of-work Iger form a partnership to produce new comics, anticipating that the well of available reprints would soon run dry. He said that in late 1936, the two formed Eisner & Iger, one of the first comics packagers. Iger was 32; Eisner claimed to be 25 so as not to scare Iger off.

As Eisner recounted,

We met on 43rd Street opposite the printing plant of the New York Daily News, just off Third Avenue.... [T]he only comic books being started were all reprinting daily newspaper comic strips, adventure strips, and it suddenly hit me, out of the blue, that they would run out of a supply of these strips very soon, and then there'll be an opportunity to sell original material, drawn especially for these comic books. So we had lunch at this little beanery, and I told Jerry Iger about this idea and said I'd like to form a company with him and we'd produce the original art for these comic books. He was 13 years older than me, and I figured he was mature, and so he could handle the sales.... Iger said, 'Frankly, it's going to take money, and I don't have any money.... I had $15 that I'd just gotten for a commercial job. And I knew about a little building on 41st Street just off Madison Avenue ... that rented rooms, offices, for something like $5 or $10 a month. No lease. They usually rented them to bookies, little one-room things. So I told Jerry, 'I'll put up the dough. And I'll do all the art, and all you have to do is go out and sell it.' We made a deal, shook hands. We agreed to form a corporation – Eisner and Iger, my name first because I was the big money man. (laughs)

Renting a one-room office on East 41st Street in Manhattan for $5 a month (the first three months' rent fronted by Eisner, who'd just been paid for a one-time commercial art job for a product called Gre-Solvent), Eisner & Iger began, with the former as the sole writing and art staff and the latter handling sales and also lettering the comics. Through Eisner's use of pseudonyms, including "Willis Rensie" ("Eisner" spelled backward) and "Erwin" (his middle name), the company gave the impression of being larger than it was.

A fictionalized account of Eisner's time with the company is depicted in Eisner's largely autobiographical graphic novel, The Dreamer.

=== Jerry Iger account ===
In a 1985 account, Iger said:

Back in 1937, I had been producing a lot of material under my own banner, 'Universal Phoenix Features'. (Note: Per Eisner's recollection, Universal Phoenix Syndicate "started as a way of selling comic strips to small local newspapers along the East Coast. A lot of small papers had no way of getting comic strips if they were in the same territory as a big metropolitan paper.... I said, 'Let's see what we can do about that'. And Iger said he'd go with that. So we hired two salesmen, two hotshot salesmen – Rilley and Begg. I don't remember their first names, but they were fast-talking hotshots. The idea was that they would go into these small-town newspapers and sell them a page of our comic strips. The last panel of each strip was blank," to leave space for advertising.) In my shop were some wonderful artists, many of whom worked free-lance on an 'as needed' basis. Included were such names as Mort Meskin and Will Eisner.... Will was working for me doing 'Hawk [sic] of the Seas' and 'ZX-5'. He also did sports drawings that I syndicated with my other materials throughout the U.S. ... Universal Phoenix Features had gone into a "holding pattern" because I had gone into a brief partnership with Will Eisner in mid-1938 only to buy him out in 1940 when Will was drafted [sic] into the Army to do military posters. (Will had become so accomplished – and so expensive! – as a free-lance artist, that the only way I could afford his services was to make him a partner.) After 'Eisner & Iger, Ltd.' was dissolved, I returned to publishing as 'Phoenix Features'.

Note: Eisner was not drafted in 1940, but rather in 1942. Eisner, however, did leave the firm in 1940 to produce The Spirit.

== Company history and influence ==
However it was structured, the firm grew to be one of the most successful and influential comics packagers — joining Funnies, Inc. (which supplied the contents of Marvel Comics No. 1, including the Human Torch, the Sub-Mariner and the Angel) and the quirkily named Harry "A" Chesler's studio.

Its first client, made through Iger's connections at Wow! was Editors Press Service. Joshua B. Powers, reportedly a former U.S. government agent whose beat was South America, had founded the company when he retired, and provided Latin American newspapers with comics strips, cooking features and other material in exchange for ad space that he would in turn sell to U.S. companies. After expanding to other countries, Editors Press Service had a British client, the magazine Wags, for which Eisner and Iger, under the pseudonym "W. Morgan Thomas," created the leggy, leopard-wearing jungle goddess Sheena. That much-imitated "female Tarzan" would become famous stateside in 1938 when writer "William Thomas" and artist Mort Meskin took over her exploits in Eisner & Iger client Fiction House's Jumbo Comics No. 1.

Eisner & Iger created material as well for Fox Comics, Quality Comics, and others. By 1939, the firm had 15 writers, artists and letterers on staff, according to Eisner: "They were working for me full-time, on salary. I tried to avoid dealing with freelancers on a per-page basis", (although future industry veteran Jack Kirby called his early work in the Eisner & Iger office freelance). Other future luminaries who worked there included Bob Kane, Lou Fine, Bernard Baily, Dick Briefer, Bob Powell, and Toni Blum. During this time, Eisner is credited with co-creating characters including Doll Man and Blackhawk.

Turning a profit of $1.50 a page, Eisner claimed, "I got very rich before I was 22", later detailing that in Depression-era 1939, for example, he and Iger "had split $25,000 between us", a considerable amount for the time.

== S. M. Iger Studio ==
S. M. Iger Studio a.k.a. Roche-Iger Studio
- Trade name: Phoenix Features Corporation
- Type: Comics studio
- Predecessor: Eisner and Iger Studio
- Founded: 1940
- Founders: Jerry Iger
- Defunct: 1961
- Headquarters: New York City, United States
- Key people: Ruch Roche
- Products: Comics for "Pre-Trend" EC Comics, Superior Comics, Ajax-Farrell
- Services: Comics packaging
- Members: Nina Albright, Ruth Atkinson, Matt Baker, Alex Blum, Toni Blum, Ann Brewster, Nick Cardy, Louis Cazeneuve, Al Feldstein, Dick Giordano, Fletcher Hanks, Jack Kamen, Joe Kubert, Charles Nicholas, Al Plastino, Bob Powell, Don Rico, Jerry Siegel, George Tuska

Eisner sold his share of company stock to Iger in late 1939 or early 1940 in order to leave and launch The Spirit. With Eisner gone, Iger continued as a packager under the company name the S. M. Iger Studio, hiring Ruth Roche as an editor in 1940. Roche was elevated to partner in 1945, with some sources claiming the studio then became known as the Roche-Iger Studio.

A number of notable creators stayed on at the company after Eisner left, including Alex Blum, Toni Blum, Nick Cardy, Louis Cazeneuve, Fletcher Hanks, Charles Nicholas, Bob Powell, and George Tuska. Other creators who packaged comics for the Iger Studio include Matt Baker, Al Feldstein, Dick Giordano, Jack Kamen, Joe Kubert, Al Plastino, Don Rico, and Superman co-creator Jerry Siegel. Female artists Toni Blum, Nina Albright, Ruth Atkinson, Ann Brewster, Fran Hopper, Lily Renée, and Marcia Snyder also worked for the studio, presumably getting a foot in the door thanks to Roche.

From 1946 to 1950, the studio packaged "Pre-Trend" material for EC Comics. From 1947 to 1954, the Iger Studio packaged comics for the Canadian publisher Superior, and from 1954 to 1958, it packaged material for Ajax-Farrell titles. (According to Who's Who of American Comic Books, Iger was co-owner of Superior from 1945 to c. 1956, and co-owner of Ajax-Farrell with Robert W. Farrell from 1946 to 1958.)

The studio operated until 1961.

== Creators ==
Notable creators associated with Eisner & Iger and the S. M. Iger Studio (and the years they worked for the company):

=== Eisner & Iger ===
- Vince Alascia (1938–1939)
- Bernard Baily (1937–1939)
- Alex Blum (1938–1939)
- Toni Blum (1938–1939)
- Dick Briefer (1937–1939)
- Nick Cardy (1939)
- Louis Cazeneuve (1939)
- Reed Crandall (1939)
- Will Eisner (1937–1939)
- Robert Farrell (1939)
- Lou Fine (1938–1939)
- Fletcher Hanks (1939)
- Bob Kane (1937–1938)
- Jack Kirby (1937–1938)
- Mort Meskin (1938–1939)
- Charles Nicholas (1939)
- Bob Powell (1938–1939)
- Charles Sultan (1939)
- George Tuska (1939)
- Chic Stone (intern, 1939)

=== S. M. Iger Studio ===
- Nina Albright (1943–1944)
- Matt Baker (1944–1948)
- Alex Blum (1940-1942)
- Toni Blum (1940–1942)
- Ann Brewster (c. 1944–1948)
- Nick Cardy (1940–1942)
- Louis Cazeneuve (1940–1941)
- John Celardo (1940–1941)
- Al Fagaly (c. 1941)
- Myron Fass (1949–c. 1953)
- Al Feldstein (1941–1948)
- Al Gabriele (c. 1941–1942)
- Frank Giacoia (1941)
- Dick Giordano (1951–1952)
- Fletcher Hanks (1940)
- Jack Kamen (1942, 1946–1952)
- Henry C. Kiefer (c. 1940–c. 1953)
- Joe Kubert (c. 1942)
- Mort Leav (1941–1943)
- Jim Mooney (1940–1942)
- Ruben Moreira (1942–1943)
- Charles Nicholas (1940–1942)
- Klaus Nordling (1940–1941)
- Don Perlin (1949–1950)
- Al Plastino (1940–1941)
- Bob Powell (1940–1943)
- Don Rico (early 1940s)
- Art Saaf (1941–1942)
- Jerry Siegel (early 1950s)
- Sal Trapani (1950–1953)
- George Tuska (1940–1941)

== See also ==
- Everett M. "Busy" Arnold
- Harry "A" Chesler
- Funnies Inc.
