= Mr. Mystic =

Comics series created by Will Eisner

Mr. Mystic in action.

Mr. Mystic is a comics series featuring a magician crime-fighter, created by Will Eisner and initially drawn by Bob Powell. The strip featured in four-page backup feature a Sunday-newspaper comic-book insert, known colloquially as "The Spirit Section". It first appeared in 1940, distributed by the Register and Tribune Syndicate.

Mr. Mystic, whose alter ego was an American diplomat named Ken, gained his superpowers in Tibet, where he was chosen by the mysterious Council of Seven Lamas to fight against evil. The council gives him a tattoo of an arcane symbol on his forehead, and he dresses in stage magician clothing: a business suit, with a cape and turban. Among his abilities were the power to transform into animals and to grow to giant or minute sizes. After receiving these gifts, he returns to the United States to fight crime.

== Publication history ==
Along with the series Lady Luck, the Mr. Mystic strip followed the seven-page lead feature The Spirit in a 16-page, tabloid-sized, newsprint comic book sold as part of eventually 20 Sunday newspapers with a combined circulation of as many as five million copies. "The Spirit Section" premiered on June 2, 1940 and continued through 1952.

In 1941, Mr. Mystic had a sharp-tongued fiancee, FBI agent Penny Douglas. Later on, he took on a comedy sidekick named Chowderhead.

Fred Guardineer filled in for Powell on the strip for three weeks in October 1943, but Powell resumed the strip and continued until its end on May 14, 1944.

Unlike the newspaper series The Spirit or Lady Luck, Mr. Mystic was not later reprinted in standard comic books by publisher Quality Comics, and considered the least successful, it was the first of the three series to end.

During the 1970s and 80s, several Mr. Mystic stories were reprinted in the black-and-white magazine The Spirit, during the Kitchen Sink Press portion of the magazine's run. In 1990, Eclipse Comics published a one-shot comic book reprinting the first five Mr. Mystic stories.

Mr. Mystic also appears as a regular character in Will Eisner's John Law: Dead Man Walking (2004, IDW), a collection of stories that features new adventures by writer/artist Gary Chaloner. The book features other Eisner creations including Lady Luck, John Law and Nubbin, the Shoe Shine Boy.

== Quotes ==
After The Spirit, perhaps the best drawn feature in the section was Powell's Mr. Mystic. Eisner created Mr. Mystic by retooling his Yarko the Great, which had been syndicated overseas. After running through Eisner's scripts, Powell wrote and drew the feature until he was drafted a couple of years later. A very good artist, Powell was a journeyman writer who tried but never managed to sell Eisner on some Spirit scripts, a situation that rankled Powell for some time.

— Heintjes, Tom
