= The Spirit (character) =

Fictional character

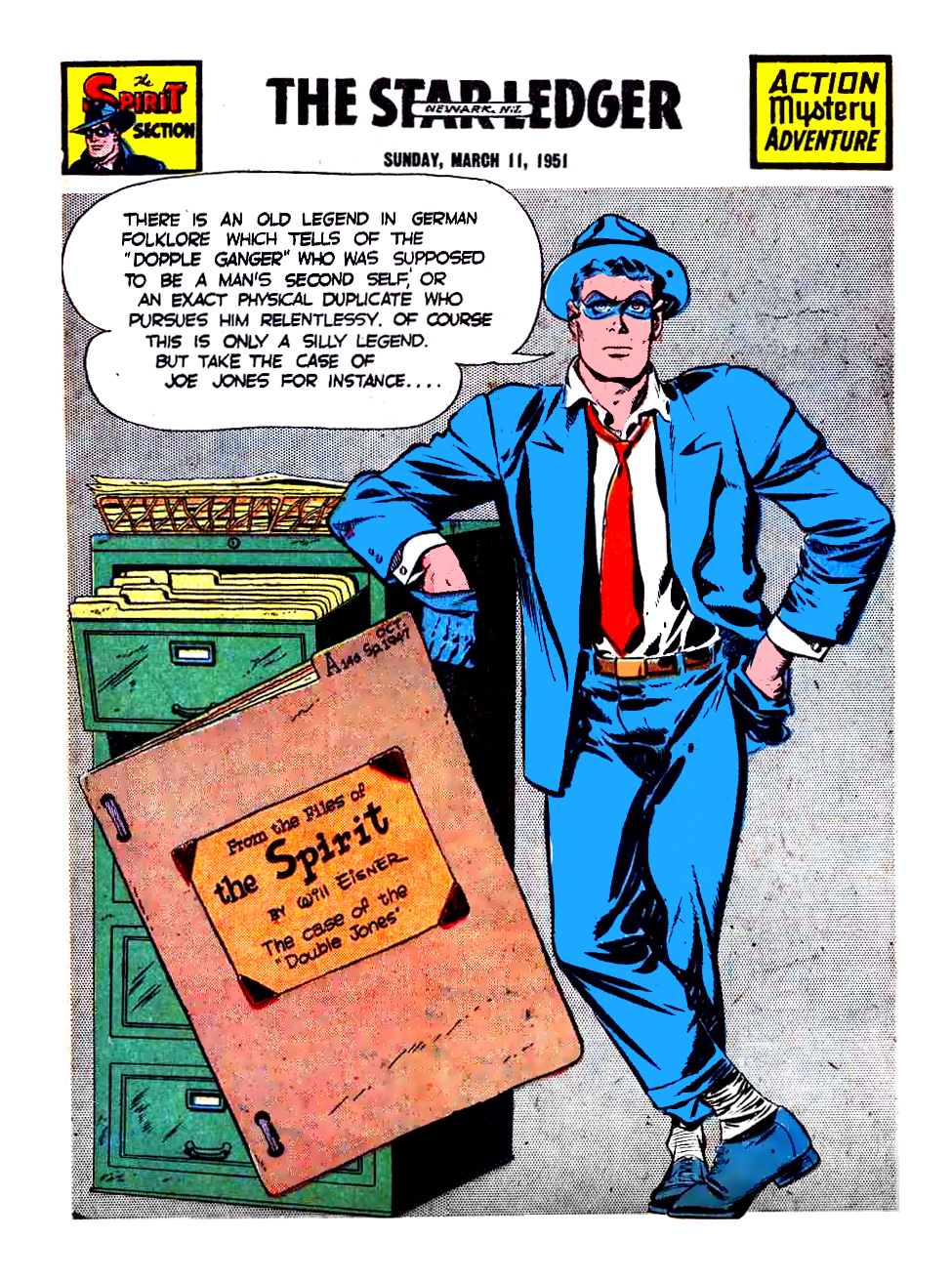
- Splash page for "The Case of the 'Double Jones'" (March 11, 1951), depicting the Spirit. Art by Will Eisner.

Publication information
- Publisher: "The Spirit Section" Register and Tribune Syndicate; Reprints and continuations Various, including: Quality Comics; Fiction House; Harvey Comics; Kitchen Sink Press; Warren Publishing; DC Comics; Dark Horse Comics; IDW Publishing; Dynamite Entertainment
- First appearance: "The Origin of The Spirit" (June 2, 1940)
- Created by: Will Eisner

In-story information
- Alter ego: Denny Colt
- Species: Human
- Team affiliations: Central City Police Department
- Abilities: Master detective and criminologist; Peak human physical and mental condition; Outstanding hand-to-hand combatant; Later, non-Eisner stories only: Decelerated aging; Film adaptation only: Healing factor

The Spirit is a fictional masked crimefighter appearing in American comic books. Created by cartoonist Will Eisner, he first appeared as the main feature of a comic book insert in the Sunday edition of Register and Tribune Syndicate newspapers. Depending on the individual newspaper, the insert may have been of standard US comic book size, newspaper-page folded twice, or two uncut newspaper pages; in each case, the size of the comic panels would have been about the same. Popularly referred to as "The Spirit Section", the insert ran from June 2, 1940 to October 5, 1952.

The Spirit is the alias of Denny Colt, a private investigator and criminologist based in the fictional Central City, who falls into suspended animation while trying to apprehend the mad scientist Dr. Cobra. Officially pronounced dead, Colt revives after being interred in Wildwood Cemetery. With the blessing of his old friend, police Commissioner Eustace Dolan, Colt becomes a domino mask-wearing "friendly outlaw" who pursues criminals that might otherwise escape capture by traditional law enforcement. The Spirit usually does not possess any superpowers, but relies on his wits and physical prowess, as well as the myth of his supposed resurrection, in his battles against evildoers. He frequently encounters femmes fatale over the course of his adventures, including serial seducer P'Gell, thief-turned-troubleshooter Silk Satin, and his estranged childhood friend Sand Saref. He also comes into conflict with his archenemy the Octopus, an unseen criminal mastermind. Other supporting characters include Ellen Dolan, Commissioner Dolan's headstrong daughter and the Spirit's primary love interest, and his recurring sidekick Ebony White, a young, diminutive cab driver.

"The Spirit Section" was commissioned by Quality Comics publisher Everett M. "Busy" Arnold as a means of helping the Register and Tribune compete with the burgeoning comic book industry; Eisner, with the assistance of several ghost writers and artists, used The Spirit to reach a more mature readership compared to other comic books of the time. Although predominantly a mix of crime drama, noir and mystery, the series defied reader expectations by wildly experimenting with genre and tone, including horror, slapstick comedy, romance, fantasy, metafiction and science fiction. In some stories, the role of the Spirit himself amounts to only a cameo appearance, with Paul Gravett noting that the character would often take a "back seat to the small dramas of losers, dreamers and ordinary joes", and that the series as a whole was, "as much as anything, about the human spirit". At the peak of its popularity, "The Spirit Section" was included in 20 American newspapers, with a total circulation of five million copies.

From the 1960s to the 1980s, Eisner wrote and drew a handful of new Spirit stories, which appeared in Harvey Comics and elsewhere. Warren Publishing and Kitchen Sink Press variously reprinted the newspaper feature in black-and-white comics magazines and color comic books; DC Comics reprinted the entirety of Eisner's run in a 26-volume color collection known as The Spirit Archives. From the 1990s to the 2010s, Kitchen Sink Press, DC Comics and Dynamite Entertainment also published new Spirit stories by other writers and artists.

Widely regarded as Eisner's most famous creation, The Spirit has been credited with influencing the later underground comix movement and such filmmakers as William Friedkin and Brad Bird. In 2011, IGN ranked the Spirit as 21st in the Top 100 Comic Book Heroes of all time. In other media, the character was portrayed by Sam J. Jones in a 1987 television film and by Gabriel Macht in a 2008 film adaptation written and directed by Frank Miller.

== Publication history ==
In late 1939, Everett M. "Busy" Arnold, publisher of the Quality Comics comic-book line, began exploring an expansion into newspaper Sunday supplements, aware that many newspapers felt they had to compete with the suddenly burgeoning new medium of American comic books, as exemplified by the Chicago Tribune Comic Book, premiering two months before "The Spirit Section". Arnold compiled a presentation piece with existing Quality Comics material. An editor of The Washington Star liked George Brenner's comic-book feature "The Clock", but not Brenner's art, and was favorably disposed toward a Lou Fine strip. Arnold, concerned over the meticulous Fine's slowness and his ability to meet deadlines, claimed it was the work of Eisner, Fine's boss at the Eisner & Iger studio, from which Arnold bought his outsourced comics work.

In "late '39, just before Christmas time", Eisner recalled in 1979, "Arnold came to me and said that the Sunday newspapers were looking for a way of getting into this comic book boom". In a 2004 interview, Eisner elaborated on that meeting:

"Busy" invited me up for lunch one day and introduced me to [sales manager of the Des Moines Register and Tribune Syndicate] Henry Martin, who said, "The newspapers in this country, particularly the Sunday papers, are looking to compete with comics books, and they would like to get a comic-book insert into the newspapers"... Martin asked if I could do it... It meant that I'd have to leave Eisner & Iger [which] was making money; we were very profitable at that time and things were going very well. A hard decision. Anyway, I agreed to do the Sunday comic book and we started discussing the deal [which] was that we'd be partners in the "Comic Book Section", as they called it at that time.

Eisner negotiated an agreement with the syndicate in which Arnold would copyright the feature but, "Written down in the contract I had with 'Busy' Arnold — and this contract exists today as the basis for my copyright ownership — Arnold agreed that it was my property. They agreed that if we had a split-up in any way, the property would revert to me on that day that happened. My attorney went to 'Busy' Arnold and his family, and they all signed a release agreeing that they would not pursue the question of ownership." This would include the eventual backup features, "Mr. Mystic" and "Lady Luck."

Selling his share of their firm to Iger, who would continue to package comics as the S. M. Iger Studio and as Phoenix Features through 1955, for $20,000, Eisner left to create "The Spirit Section". "They gave me an adult audience", Eisner said in 1997, "and I wanted to write better things than superheroes. Comic books were a ghetto. I sold my part of the enterprise to my associate and then began The Spirit. They wanted an heroic character, a costumed character. They asked me if he'd have a costume. And I put a mask on him and said, 'Yes, he has a costume!'"

The character and the types of stories Eisner would tell, Eisner said in 1978, derived from his desire

...to do short stories. I always regarded comics as a legitimate medium, my medium. Creating a detective character would... provide me with the most viable vehicle for the kind of stories I could best tell. The syndicate people weren't in full agreement with me... [I]n my first discussion with 'Busy' Arnold, his thinking centered around a superhero kind of character—a costumed character; we didn't use the word 'superhero' in those days... and I argued vehemently against it because I [had] had my bellyful of creating costumed heroes at Eisner and Iger... [S]o actually one evening, around three in the morning, I was still working, trying to find it—I only had about a week-and-a-half or two weeks in which to produce the first issue, the whole deal was done in quite a rush—and I came up with an outlaw hero, suitable, I felt, for an adult audience.

The character's name, he said in that interview, came from Arnold: "When 'Busy' Arnold called, he suggested a kind of ghost or some kind of metaphysical character. He said, 'How about a thing called the Ghost?' and I said, 'Naw, that's not any good,' and he said, 'Well, then, call it the Spirit; there's nothing like that around.' I said, 'Well, I don't know what you mean.,' and he said, 'Well, you can figure that out—I just like the words "the Spirit."' He was calling from a bar somewhere, I think... [A]nd actually, the more I thought about it the more I realized I didn't care about the name."

The Spirit, an initially eight (and later seven) page urban-crimefighter series, ran with the initial backup features "Mr. Mystic" and "Lady Luck" in a 16-page Sunday supplement (colloquially called "The Spirit Section") that was eventually distributed in 20 newspapers with a combined circulation of as many as five million copies. It premiered June 2, 1940, and continued through 1952. Eisner, the overall editor, wrote and drew most Spirit entries, with the uncredited assistance of his studio of assistants and collaborators, though with Eisner's singular vision a unifying factor. From 1940–1950, Busy Arnold reprinted Spirit stories under his Quality Comics banner, first individually from 1940–1947 as one of the features in ninety-two issues of Police Comics (#11–102), and from 1944–1950 as twenty-two issues of an associated Spirit comic book with several stories per issue. From 1952–1954, Fiction House published five issues of their own Spirit reprint comic book, continuing this process.

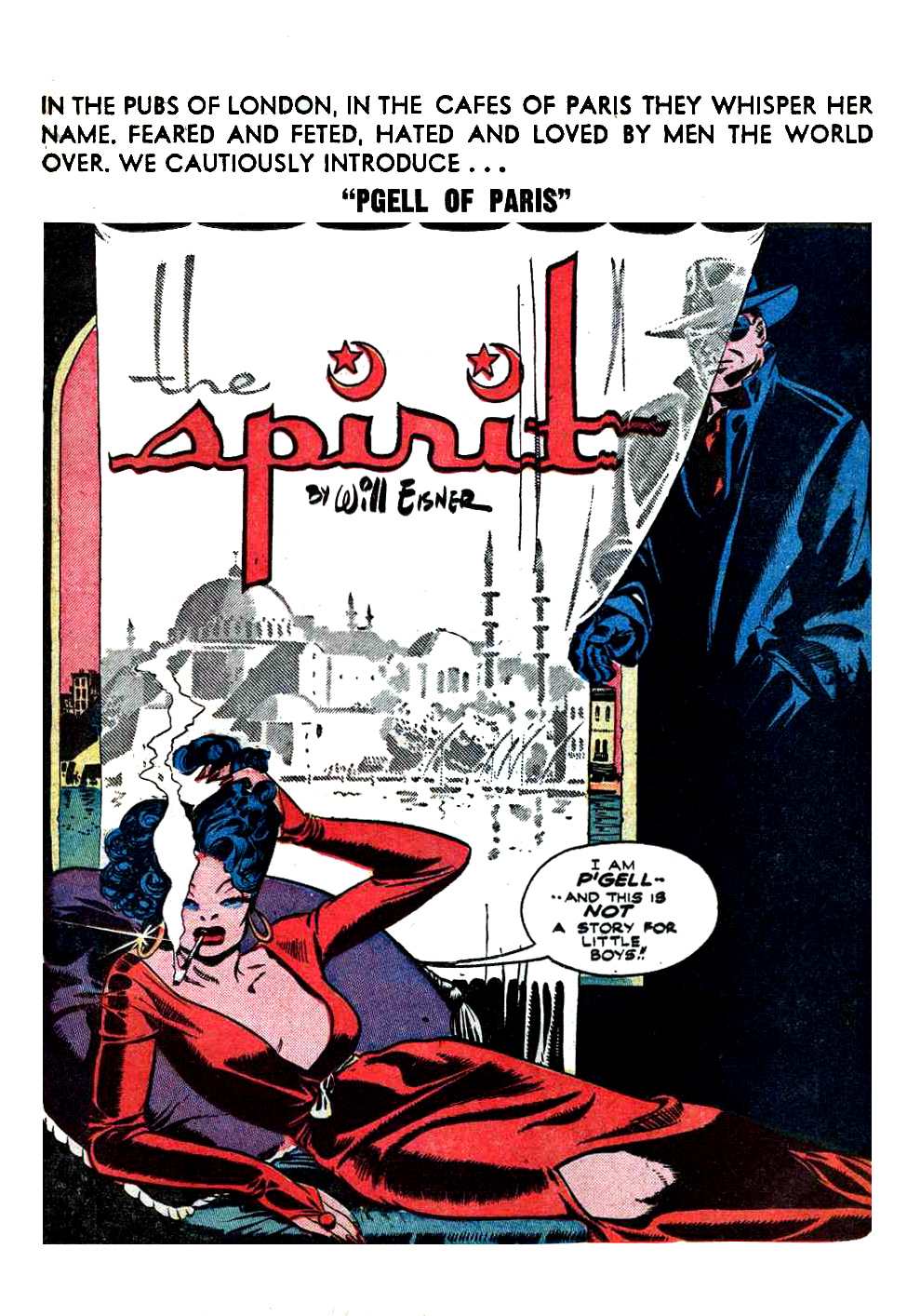
Eisner's splash page for "P'Gell of Paris" (October 6, 1946). Note the innovative use of title design, the mix of color and black-and-white, and the shadowing and texturing that combine for exotic noir effect.

Eisner was drafted into the U.S. Army in late 1941, "and then had about another half-year which the government gave me to clean up my affairs before going off" to fight in World War II. In his absence, the newspaper syndicate used ghost writers and artists to continue the strip, including Manly Wade Wellman, William Woolfolk, Jack Cole and Lou Fine.

Eisner's rumpled, masked hero (with his headquarters under the tombstone of his supposedly deceased true identity, Denny Colt) and his gritty, detailed view of big-city life (based on Eisner's Jewish upbringing in New York City) both reflected and anticipated the noir outlook of film and fiction in the 1940s. Eisner said in 2001 that he created the strip as a vehicle to explore various genres: "When I created The Spirit, I never had any intention of creating a superhero. I never felt The Spirit would dominate the feature. He served as a sort of an identity for the strip. The stories were what I was interested in." In some episodes, the nominal hero makes a brief, almost incidental appearance while the story focuses on a real-life drama played out in streets, dilapidated tenements, and smoke-filled back rooms. Yet along with violence and pathos, the feature lived on humor, both subtle and overt. He was shot, knocked silly, bruised, often amazed into near immobility and constantly confused by beautiful women.

The feature ended with the October 5, 1952, edition. As The Comics Journal editor-publisher Gary Groth wrote, "By the late '40s, Eisner's participation in the strip had dwindled to a largely supervisory role. ... Eisner hired Jerry Grandenetti and Jim Dixon to occasionally ink his pencils. By 1950, Jules Feiffer was writing most of the strips, and Grandenetti, Dixon, and Al Wenzel were drawing them." Grandenetti, who penciled as a ghost-artist under Eisner's byline, said in 2005 that before the feature's demise, Eisner had "tried everything. Had me penciling 'The Spirit'. Later on it was Wally Wood", who drew the final installments.

== Fictional character biography ==
The Spirit, referred to in one newspaper article cited below as "the only real middle-class crimefighter", was the hero persona of young detective/criminologist Denny Colt. Presumed killed in the first three pages of the premiere story, Colt later revealed to his friend, Central City Police Commissioner Dolan, that he had in fact gone into suspended animation caused by the villainous Dr. Cobra's experiments. When Colt awakened in Wildwood Cemetery, he established a base there beneath his own tombstone. Using his new-found anonymity, Colt began a life of fighting crime wearing a simple costume comprising a blue domino mask, business suit, fedora hat, and gloves (plus a white shirt and red necktie). While elements of this basic costume occasionally vary (depending on the Spirit's circumstances and where he is in the world), he is always depicted wearing his blue domino mask and blue leather gloves. The Spirit dispensed justice with the aid of his assistant Ebony White, funding his adventures with an inheritance from his late father Denny Colt Sr. and the rewards from capturing various villains.

The Spirit originally was based in New York City, but this was quickly changed to the fictional "Central City". Not tied to one locale, his adventures took him around the globe and even to the Moon. He met eccentrics, kooks, and femmes fatale, bringing his own form of justice to all of them. The story changed continually, but certain themes remained constant: the love between the Spirit and Dolan's feisty protofeminist daughter Ellen; the annual "Christmas Spirit" stories; and his archenemy the Octopus (a psychopathic criminal mastermind who was never seen, except for his distinctive purple gloves).

== Ebony White ==
The Spirit with Ebony White. The Spirit #10 (Fall 1947), Quality Comics. Cover art by Reed Crandall.

Eisner was criticized for his depiction of Ebony White, the Spirit's African-American sidekick. The character's name is a racial pun, and his facial features, including large white eyes and thick pinkish lips, are typical of racial blackface caricatures popular throughout the "Jim Crow" era. Eisner later admitted to consciously stereotyping the character, but said he tried to do so with "responsibility", and argued that "at the time humor consisted in our society of bad English and physical difference in identity". The character, who was consistently treated with respect by the strip's fellow cast-members, developed beyond the stereotype as the series progressed, and Eisner also introduced such African-American characters as the no-nonsense Detective Grey who defied popular stereotypes.

Ebony debuted as a resourceful taxi driver in the first "Spirit Section". He became a mainstay of the strip and a principal member of the Spirit's supporting cast, appearing semi-regularly as the focus of an episode rather than the Spirit himself. Eisner phased him out of the series in 1949, introducing a Caucasian boy named Sammy as the Spirit's new assistant. Sammy returns to Central City with the Spirit from an adventure in the South Seas, and is welcomed by Ebony and the Dolans. Ebony appears only briefly after Sammy's introduction, and is rarely seen again during the series. His last regular "starring" role was in "Young Dr. Ebony", published on May 29, 1949 and he makes one comeback appearance in "School is Out" over two years later, published on June 24, 1951. After this one-week reappearance, Ebony disappears again from the series until a couple of mostly-wordless earthbound appearances with Sammy during the "Outer Space Spirit" storyline that ended The Spirit in late 1952.

The character appears as an adult office worker in a one-off Spirit story that appeared January 9, 1966, in the New York Herald Tribune. In an accompanying feature article in that edition, Eisner's former office manager Marilyn Mercer wrote, "Ebony never drew criticism from Negro groups (in fact, Eisner was commended by some for using him), perhaps because, although his speech pattern was early Minstrel Show, he himself derived from another literary tradition: he was a combination of Tom Sawyer and Penrod, with a touch of Horatio Alger hero, and color didn't really come into it".

== Other characters ==
- Dr. Cobra is a mad scientist whose chemicals and machinations inadvertently help Denny Colt become the Spirit.
- Darling O' Shea is the richest and most spoiled child in the world.
- Hazel P. Macbeth is a witch with a Shakespearean motif and apparent magical powers. (Vide Macbeth.)
- Lorelei Rox, an apparent siren, appeared in a September 1948 strip and subsequently in 2000s DC Comics Spirit stories. (Vide Lorelei rock.)
- Mister Carrion is a morbid con man with a pet vulture named Julia. (Vide carrion.)
- The Octopus is the archenemy of the Spirit. He is a criminal mastermind and master of disguise who never shows his real face, though he is identified by his distinctive purple gloves. In the second issue of the 1960s Harvey Comics Spirit comic book, his name is given as Zitzbath Zark. The first name is a pun on sitz bath.
- P'Gell is a femme fatale who perennially tries to seduce the Spirit to a life of crime at her side. She seduces and marries wealthy men who invariably die in mysterious ways, and uses their money to fund her crime empire in Istanbul and expand her influence and control over the underworld. After moving to Central City to find the Spirit, she continues her modus operandi of selected marriages with the cream of society, even gaining an ally in the form of Saree, the young daughter of one of her deceased husbands. In the 2000s DC Comics version, P'Gell was once a young socialite in love with a doctor, working in Third World countries, and turned to a life of crime when he was killed. (Vide Pigalle.)
- P.S. Smith ("Peppermint Stick" Smith AKA Algernon Tidewater) is a silent, baseball helmet-wearing associate of Ebony. Always sucking on a peppermint stick and appearing to be 6–8 years of age, the wordless P.S. is capable of superhuman feats (always played for comedic effect) and serves as Eisner's comic embodiment of anarchy and disruption. P.S. first appeared in The Philadelphia Inquirer as the star of a pantomime strip appearing underneath the main Spirit story, before Eisner introduced the character within the main strip (as Algernon Tidewater) in 1941. The character was renamed P.S. in his first postwar appearance in May 1946.
- Officer Sam Klink is a brave, big-hearted but not particularly bright member of the Central City Police Department. A regular member of the postwar Spirit Section cast list, Klink is a loyal aide to Commissioner Dolan and a frequent ally of the Spirit.
- Sand Saref is a childhood friend of Denny Colt, and knows he is the Spirit. Working in espionage, she usually ends up on the opposite side of the law from him. She appears several times, always involved in some criminal scheme. (Vide sans serif.)
- Silk Satin is a tall, statuesque brunette with a white streak in her hair, originally an adventuress who later reformed and worked as an international troubleshooter for the insurance company Croyd's of Glasgow. In later stories, it is revealed she has a daughter, Hildie, who motivates her to stay on the straight path. In the 2000s DC Comics revival, she is a smaller, more slender, blond CIA agent.
- Silken Floss is a nuclear physicist and a surgeon, who acts as the accomplice to the Octopus.

== "Ev'ry Little Bug" ==
The song "Ev'ry Little Bug" (with lyrics written by Eisner) appears regularly between 1946 and 1950. The initial lines of the song were first uttered in the story "Poole's Toadstool Facial Cream" (June 9, 1946). By the end of 1946, all of the lyrics had appeared, sung by various characters. In 1947, Eisner collaborated with his World War II service friend Bill Harr, who composed a melody for Eisner's lyrics. The complete song appears in the April 27, 1947 "Spirit Section", here titled "Ev'ry Li'l Bug", with Ebony credited within the storyline as its composer. In the story "Wiffenpoof" (June 29, 1947), real-life operatic singer Robert Merrill was depicted singing the tune. Shortly afterward, the Robbins Music Corporation of New York published "Ev'ry Little Bug" as sheet music, with an image of Ebony on its cover page. After three more appearances in the strip, "Ev'ry Little Bug" remained dormant until 1987, when music producer John Christensen assembled a recording featuring five versions of the tune, released by Kitchen Sink as a picture disc with an exclusive Spirit/Ebony image illustrated by Eisner on one side and the original art for the sheet music on the other. The record featured actor Billy Mumy playing guitar on some tracks.

=== Song appearances ===
- June 9, 1946 – "Poole's Toadstool Facial Cream"
- July 7, 1946 – "Dulcet Tone"
- October 13, 1946 – "The Heart of Rosie Lee"
- December 15, 1946 – "The Van Gaul Diamonds"
- December 29, 1946 – "Hubert The Duck"
- February 2, 1947 – "The Cosmic Answer"
- March 16, 1947 – "Hoagy the Yogi"
- April 27, 1947 – "Ev'ry Li'l Bug"
- June 29, 1947 – "Wiffenpoof"
- August 17, 1947 – "The Picnic"
- March 27, 1949 – "The Dummy"
- April 30, 1950 – "Wanted, Dangerous Job"

== The Spirit and John Law ==
Several Spirit stories, such as the first appearance of Sand Saref, were retooled from a failed publishing venture featuring an eyepatched, pipe-smoking detective named John Law. Law and his shoeshine-boy sidekick, Nubbin, starred in several adventures planned for a new comics series. These completed adventures were adapted into Spirit stories, with John Law's eyepatch being changed to the Spirit's mask, and Nubbin redrawn as Willum Waif or other Spirit supporting characters. The original John Law stories were restored and published in Will Eisner's John Law: Dead Man Walking (IDW Publishing, 2004), a collection of stories that also features new adventures by writer-artist Gary Chaloner, starring John Law, Nubbin, and other Eisner creations, including Lady Luck and Mr. Mystic.

== Assistants and collaborators ==
Like most artists working in newspaper comic strips, Eisner after a time employed a studio of assistants who, on any given week's story, might draw or simply ink backgrounds, ink parts of Eisner's main characters (such as clothing or shoes), or as eventually occurred, ghost-draw the strip entirely. Eisner also eventually used ghostwriters, generally in collaboration with him.

Jules Feiffer, who began as an art assistant c. 1946 and later became the primary writer through the strip's end in 1952, recalled, "When I first worked for Will there was John Spranger, who was his penciler and a wonderful draftsman; better than Will. There was Sam Rosen, the lettering man. Jerry Grandenetti came a little after me and did backgrounds, and Jerry had some architectural background. His drawing was stiff but loosened up after a while, but he drew backgrounds and inked them beautifully. And Abe Kanegson, who was my best friend in the office, was a jack-of-all-trades but mostly did lettering and backgrounds after Jerry left. Abe was a mentor to me."

Eisner's studio also included:

- Art assistants: Bob Powell (1940), Dave Berg (backgrounds, 1940–41), Tex Blaisdell (1940–41), Fred Kida (1941), Alexander Kostuk a.k.a. Alex Koster (1941–43), Jack Cole (1942–43), Jack Keller (backgrounds, 1943), Jules Feiffer (1946–47), Manny Stallman (1947–49), Andre LeBlanc (1950), Al Wenzel (1952)
- Inkers: Alex Kotzky (1941–43), John Belfi (1942–43), Don Komisarow (1943), Robin King (year?), Joe Kubert (1943–44), Jerry Grandenetti (1948–51), Jim Dixon (1950–51), Don Perlin (1951)
- Letterers: Sam Rosen (1940-1942), Martin De Muth (1942-1947), Abe Kanegson (1947-1951), Samm Schwartz (1951), Ben Oda (1951-1952)
- Colorists: Jules Feiffer (1950–52), Chris Christiansen (1951)
- Ghost artists (pencilers): Lou Fine and Jack Cole (variously, during Eisner's World War II service, 1942–45), Jerry Grandenetti (1951), Wally Wood (1952)
- Ghostwriters/writing assistants: Toni Blum (1942), Jack Cole, Manly Wade Wellman and William Woolfolk (variously, during Eisner's World War II service, 1943–45), Klaus Nordling (1946, 1951), Marilyn Mercer (1946), Abe Kanegson (1950), Jules Feiffer (1951–52)

== Latter-day Spirit comics ==
=== 1960s ===
Harvey Comics' The Spirit #1 (Oct. 1966). Cover art by Will Eisner.

A five-page Spirit story, set in New York City, appeared as part of a January 9, 1966, article about the Spirit in the New York Herald Tribune.

Harvey Comics reprinted several Spirit stories in two giant-size, 25-cent comic books published October 1966 and March 1967, each with new Eisner covers. The first of these two 60-page issues opened with a new seven-page retelling of the Spirit's origin by writer-penciler-inker Eisner (with inking assist by Chuck Kramer). Also new was the text feature "An Interview with the Spirit", credited to Marilyn Mercer; and writer-artist Eisner's two-page featurette "Spirit Lab: Invincible Devices". Seven 1948–1949 Spirit stories were reprinted. The second issue opened with a new seven-page story by writer-artist Eisner, "Octopus: The Life Story of the King of Crime," giving the heretofore unrevealed origin of the Spirit's nemesis The Octopus, as well as his given name (Zitzbath Zark). Also new was the two-page text feature "The Spirit Answers Your Mail", and writer-artist Eisner's two-page featurette "The Spirit Lab: The Man from MSD". Reprinted were seven 1948–50 Spirit stories.

=== 1970s ===
In 1973, Denis Kitchen's Kitchen Sink Press published two issues of The Spirit (also known as Underground Spirit), consisting primarily of reprints with original front and back covers, and featuring introductions by Maurice Horn and John Benson. The first issue includes four original single-page stories, while the second issue (cover titled "All About P'Gell") includes the four-page story, "The Capistrano Jewels." During this period, Eisner also released "The Invader", a five-page story in a one-shot Spirit publication Eisner created for his lecture at Sheridan College in Oakville, Ontario, Canada in 1973. It was reprinted in Kitchen Sink's hardcover Will Eisner Color Treasury(1981).

From 1974 to 1976, James Warren's Warren Publishing published 16 issues of The Spirit (also known as The Spirit Magazine), a large black-and-white magazine consisting of reprints with original covers (primarily by Eisner), concluding with a separate 1975 color issue, The Spirit Special, which includes an afterword by Bill DuBay. Kitchen Sink picked up the series beginning in 1977 with issue 17, eventually concluding with issue 41 (June 1983). Issue 30 of the Kitchen Sink series (July 1981) features "The Spirit Jam", with a script from Eisner and a few penciled pages, plus contributions from 50 artists, including Fred Hembeck, Trina Robbins, Steve Leialoha, Frank Miller, Harvey Kurtzman, Howard Cruse, Brian Bolland, Bill Sienkiewicz, John Byrne, and Richard Corben.

In 1976, Tempo Books published The Spirit Casebook of True Haunted Houses and Ghosts, in which the Spirit plays the EC host, introducing "true" stories of haunted houses. The Spirit cameos in Vampirella #50 (April 1976), in the eight-page story "The Thing in Denny Colt's Grave".

=== 1980s ===
After The Spirit Magazine ceased publication with issue #41 (June 1983), Kitchen Sink Press published a complete reprinting of the post-World War II Eisner work in a standard-formatted comic-book series, which ran 87 issues (October 1983–January 1992). The series featured color stories in its first 11 issues, but switched to black-and-white from issue 12 on. Also in 1983, Kitchen Sink published Outer Space Spirit: 1952, collecting the final newspaper sections (July 27, 1952 – October 5, 1952), along with the scripts for what would have been the final three sections of the "Outer Space Spirit" saga. The publisher additionally published the one-shot Will Eisner's 3-D Classics featuring The Spirit (Dec. 1985).

=== 1990s and beyond ===
Promotional art by Darwyn Cooke for DC Comics' The Spirit

In the 1990s, Kitchen Sink published two hardcover volumes of The Spirit Casebook, the first cover-titled simply Spirit Casebook (1990), and the second cover-titled All About P'Gell: The Spirit Casebook, Volume II (1998). Kitchen Sink also published a series of original Spirit stories in The Spirit: The New Adventures (March–November 1998), including contributions from Will Eisner, Alan Moore, Dave Gibbons, Brian Bolland, Tim Bradstreet, Kurt Busiek, Eddie Campbell, Marcus Moore, Paul Chadwick, Neil Gaiman, Jean "Moebius" Giraud, Joe R. Lansdale, David Lloyd, and Paul Pope.

In the mid-2000s, DC Comics began reprinting The Spirit chronologically in the company's hardcover Archive series, in an approximately 8x10-inch format, smaller than the Kitchen Sink and Warren publications.

Eisner's final Spirit story appeared in the sixth issue of The Amazing Adventures of the Escapist, from Dark Horse Comics, published on April 20, 2005. This 6-page story featured a crossover between the Spirit and the book's lead character, the Escapist.

=== DC Comics ===
The DC Comics one-shot Batman/The Spirit (January 2007), by writer Jeph Loeb and artists Darwyn Cooke and J. Bone introduced the Spirit into the DC Universe. The first issue of the ongoing series The Spirit, written and pencilled by Cooke and inked by J. Bone, debuted the following month. The series updated some concepts, with Ellen's Internet skills helping to solve a case, and Ebony White stripped of his racial stereotype characteristics. The team of Mark Evanier and Sergio Aragones became the series' regular writers beginning with issue #14 (March 2008), with Mike Ploog and later Paul Smith providing the artwork. DC'S The Spirit series ran through issue #32 (Aug. 2009), with most running a single 22-page story.

The imprint First Wave, launched in January 2010, featured the Spirit, pulp heroes Doc Savage and The Avenger, and DC's Rima the Jungle Girl, the Blackhawks, and a Golden Age incarnation of Batman into a DC "pulpverse" overseen by writer Brian Azzarello. This imprint incorporated the 17-issue The Spirit volume two (June 2010 - Oct. 2011), written variously by Mark Schultz, David Hine, Lilah Sturges, and Howard Chaykin.

=== IDW ===
In 2013, IDW published a four issue miniseries, The Rocketeer and The Spirit: Pulp Friction, using the Spirit, Dolan, Ellen, and the Octopus as well as characters from Dave Stevens's The Rocketeer series. This was collected in a hardcover graphic novel.

=== Dynamite Entertainment ===
In 2015, Dynamite Entertainment obtained the license to publish new Spirit comics, beginning with a story by writer-artist Matt Wagner, "Who Killed The Spirit?" In 2017, the Spirit and fellow venerable crimefighter the Green Hornet shared a five-issue series, Green Hornet '66 Meets the Spirit.

== In other media ==
=== Comic strip ===
From October 13, 1941 to March 11, 1944, a black-and-white daily newspaper comic strip starring the character appeared. These were later reprinted in several collections, including the complete run in DC's The Spirit Archives Volume 25.

In early 2017, the Spirit returned to newspaper strips as a guest-star in Dick Tracy by Mike Curtis (script) and Joe Staton (art), one of several recent Dick Tracy strips reviving characters from defunct strips.

=== Television film ===
The character was the subject of a 1987 ABC television film starring Sam J. Jones as the Spirit, Nana Visitor as Ellen Dolan, and Garry Walberg as Commissioner Dolan. The film served as a pilot for a planned TV series.

=== Planned animated film ===
An animated feature to be directed by Brad Bird was in development in the 1980s. Steven Paul Leiva, animator Jerry Rees, and producer Gary Kurtz also were involved, and a presentation trailer was produced. The Spirit's voice was supplied by animator Randall William Cook.

=== Film ===
The film adaptation The Spirit, written and directed by Frank Miller, was released in theaters by Lionsgate on December 25, 2008. The film stars Gabriel Macht as the Spirit and Samuel L. Jackson as the Octopus.

=== Radio ===
Denis Kitchen, the Eisner estate's agent, said in a July 8, 2006 online interview that a radio series had been in development: "It was pitched to the estate by a couple of producers, one of whom is very experienced with NPR, so we have been back and forth on how that would work. Again, it would be premature to tell you it is going to happen, but it is in serious discussion".

== Collected editions ==
The comic strips and comics have been collected into a number of volumes:

- The Spirit Coloring Book (1974, Will Eisner Studios/Poor House Press)
- The Daily Spirit #1–4 (1974–1975, Real Free Press)
- The Spirit - The First 93 Dailies (1977, Funny Paper Bookstore/Ken Pierce)
- The Spirit, Volume 2 - 200 Dailies (1977, Funny Paper Bookstore/Ken Pierce)
- The Spirit, Volume 3 - 200 More Dailies (1980, Funny Paper Bookstore/Ken Pierce)
- The Spirit, Volume 4 - The Last 245 Dailies (1980, Funny Paper Bookstore/Ken Pierce)
- Will Eisner Color Treasury (1981, Kitchen Sink) (ISBN 0-87816-006-X)
- Spirit Color Album (1981, Kitchen Sink) (ISBN 0-87816-002-7)
- Spirit Color Album, v2 (1983, Kitchen Sink) (ISBN 0-87816-010-8)
- Spirit Color Album, v3 (1983, Kitchen Sink) (ISBN 0-87816-011-6)
- The Art of Will Eisner (1989, 2nd ed, Kitchen Sink) (ISBN 0-87816-076-0)
- The Outer Space Spirit (1989, Kitchen Sink) (ISBN 0-87816-012-4)
- Spirit Casebook (1990, Kitchen Sink) (ISBN 0-87816-094-9)
- The Christmas Spirit (1995 Kitchen Sink) (ISBN 0-87816-309-3)
- Will Eisner's The Spirit (CD-ROM), collects the 1947 Spirit sections (1995, Byron Preiss Multimedia) (ISBN 1-57251-115-X)
- All About P'Gell: Spirit Casebook II (1998 Kitchen Sink) (ISBN 0-87816-492-8)
- Spirit Jam, collects The Spirit Magazine #30 and the Spirit section of Cerebus Jam (1998, Kitchen Sink) (ISBN 0-87816-576-2)
- The Spirit Archives: (DC Comics)
  - Volume 1 (2000) (ISBN 1-56389-673-7) through Volume 26 (2009) (ISBN 1-4012-1974-8)
- The Best of The Spirit (2005 DC Comics) (ISBN 1-4012-0755-3)
- The Spirit Book 1, collects Batman/The Spirit and The Spirit (Volume 1)#1–6 (2007 DC Comics) (ISBN 1-4012-1618-8)
- The Spirit Book 2, collects The Spirit Volume 1 #7–13 (2008 DC Comics) (ISBN 1-4012-2220-X)
- The Spirit: Femmes Fatales (2008 DC Comics) (ISBN 1-4012-1973-X)
- Will Eisner's The Spirit: The New Adventures, collects Kitchen Sink's The Spirit: The New Adventures #1-8 (2009, Dark Horse) (ISBN 1-56971-732-X)
- The Spirit Book 3, collects The Spirit Volume 1 #14–20 (2009 DC Comics) (ISBN 1-4012-2186-6)
- The Spirit Book 4, collects The Spirit Volume 1 #21–25 (2009 DC Comics) (ISBN 1-4012-2505-5)
- The Spirit Book 5, collects The Spirit Volume 1 #26–32 (2010 DC Comics) (ISBN 1-4012-2642-6)
- The Spirit: Angel Smerti, collects The Spirit Volume 2 #1–7 (2011 DC Comics) (ISBN 1-4012-3026-1)
- The Spirit: The Clockwork Killer, collects The Spirit Volume 2 #8–14 (2011 DC Comics) (ISBN 1-4012-3309-0)
- Rocketeer/The Spirit: Pulp Friction, collects Rocketeer/The Spirit: Pulp Friction #1-4 (2014 IDW Publishing) (ISBN 1-61377-881-3)
- Will Eisner's The Spirit: A Celebration of 75 Years (2015 DC Comics) (ISBN 1-4012-5945-6)
- Will Eisner's The Spirit Returns, collects Dynamite's Will Eisner's The Spirit #1-12 (2016 Dynamite Entertainment) (ISBN 1-60690-841-3)
- The Green Hornet '66 Meets The Spirit, collects Dynamite's The Green Hornet '66 Meets The Spirit #1-5 (2018 Dynamite Entertainment) (ISBN 1-5241-0590-2)
- Will Eisner's The Spirit: The Corpse-Makers, collects Dynamite's Will Eisner's The Spirit: The Corpse-Makers #1-5 (2019 Dynamite Entertainment) (ISBN 1-5241-0481-7)
- The Spirit: An An 80th Anniversary Celebration, collects ten Eisner Spirit stories (five recolored by Laura Martin and Jeromy Cox) (2020 Clover Press) (ISBN 1-951038-05-3)
