= Lady Luck (comics) =

DC universe character

Lady Luck, art by Klaus Nordling

Lady Luck is an American comic-strip and comic-book crime fighter and adventuress created and designed in 1940 by Will Eisner with artist Chuck Mazoujian. She starred in a namesake, four-page weekly feature published in a Sunday newspaper comics insert colloquially called "The Spirit Section", which ran from June 2, 1940, to November 3, 1946. Her adventures were reprinted in comic books published by Quality Comics. A revamped version of the character debuted in 2013 in DC Comics's Phantom Stranger comic.

Lady Luck is the alter-ego of Brenda Banks, a young Irish-American socialite heiress, daughter of a mine-owner. Rejecting her vapid debutante circle, she trains in martial arts and adopts the persona of a costumed detective. Her costume consists of a green dress, a large hat, and a veil in place of a mask. In some early versions, representations of lucky charms hang from her hat brim. Like Denny Colt, hero of Eisner's The Spirit, she does not possess any supernatural abilities. Her love interest in the strip is Police Chief Hardy Moore, and she is also assisted by the incompetent Officer Feeny O'Mye. Neither of them knows her true identity. During the war, she leads the girls of the Lady Luck Patrol.

== Publication history ==
Created and designed in 1940 by Will Eisner (who wrote the first two Lady Luck stories under the pseudonym "Ford Davis") with artist Chuck Mazoujian, Lady Luck appeared in her namesake, four-page weekly feature published in a Sunday-newspaper comic-book insert colloquially called "The Spirit Section" (syndicated by the Register and Tribune Syndicate).

This 16-page, tabloid-sized, newsprint comic book, sold as part of 20 Sunday newspapers with a combined circulation of as many as five million, starred Eisner's masked detective the Spirit and also initially included the feature Mr. Mystic, plus filler material. Writer Dick French took over scripting after these first two episodes. Later, writer-artist Nicholas Viscardi (later known as Nick Cardy) took over the feature from the May 18, 1941 strip through Feb. 22, 1942, introducing Lady Luck's chauffeur and assistant, Peecolo. Though his Lady Luck stories were credited under the house pseudonym Ford Davis, Viscardi implemented his initials, "NV", into each issue. Writer-artist Klaus Nordling followed, from the March 1, 1942 to March 3, 1946 strip, when "Lady Luck" was temporarily canceled. After briefly being replaced by the humor feature "Wendy the Waitress" by Robert Jenny, "Lady Luck" returned from May 5 to November 3, 1946, under cartoonist Fred Schwab.

"Lady Luck" stories were reprinted in the Quality Comics comic book Smash Comics #42-85 (April 1943 - Oct. 1949), whereupon the series changed its title to Lady Luck for five more issues. Nordling providing new seven- to 11-page stories in Lady Luck #86-90 (Dec. 1949 - Aug. 1950), with Gill Fox drawing the covers. Occasional backup features were "Lassie" by writer-artist Bernard Dibble and the humor features "The Count", by Nordling, and "Sir Roger", by Dibble or, variously, Bart Tumey.

Lady Luck was revived alongside Eisner characters John Law, Nubbin, and Mr. Mystic in IDW Publishing's Will Eisner's John Law: Dead Man Walking, a 2004 collection of new stories by writer-artist Gary Chaloner.

In 2011, Lady Luck was ranked 84th in Comics Buyer's Guide's "100 Sexiest Women in Comics" list.

=== DC Comics' The New 52 ===
A new version of the character was originally intended to be featured in Geoff Johns's revamp (with artist Jim Lee) of DC Comics' Justice League, as part of the New 52.

Lady Luck made her debut in The Phantom Stranger #6 (March 2013), written by Dan DiDio. When the Stranger goes to Hell looking for his family, Lady Luck makes a non-speaking appearance dealing cards to Trigon's sons Belial, Suge and Ruskoff.
