= Ruth Roche (comics) =

Comic book writer/editor (1917-1983)

- Born: Ruth Ann Roche; February 18, 1917 U.S.
- Died: May 4, 1983 (aged 66)
- Areas: Writer, Editor
- Pseudonyms: R. A. Roche; Rod Roche; A. Talbott Roche; Agnes Wilson; George Tracy; Miss Martin; Miss Thorpe; Tom Alexander
- Notable works: Kismet, Man of Fate; Roche-Iger Studio

Ruth Ann Roche (18 February 1917 – 4 May 1983) was a writer and editor in the Golden Age of Comic Books. She was also the business partner of Jerry Iger.

== Life and career ==
Roche started as a writer at the Eisner-Iger Studio, a packager for Fiction House, in 1940. She wrote such features as "Phantom Lady", "Senorita Rio", "Sheena, Queen of the Jungle", "Kaanga", and "Camilla". She also wrote the female-led adventure newspaper strip Flamingo, drawn by Matt Baker and syndicated by Iger's Universal Phoenix Features Syndicate. In 1944, she created Kismet, Man of Fate, the first Muslim superhero, published in the comic book Bomber Comics from Elliot Publishing Company.

She soon became Iger's associate editor; in 1945 they became business partners, and the studio became the Roche-Iger Studio. She stayed with the studio until it ceased operations in 1961.

She later married a man named Schaffer (or possibly "Schaefer"). She died in 1983.

== Legacy ==
Trina Robbins and Catherine Yronwode dedicated their 1985 book, Women in the Comics, to Roche.

== Bibliography ==
=== Writer ===
- America In Action (1945) #1
- Bomber Comics (1944) #2
  - "Pixie" story
- Classic Comics (1941) #32
  - Lorna Doone
- Classics Illustrated (1947) #26, 31-32
  - Frankenstein
  - The Black Arrow
  - Lorna Doone
- Fight Comics (1940) #53
- Haunted Thrills (1952) #11
  - Out of the Grave
- Jumbo Comics (1938) #44, 152
- Phantom Lady (1947) #13-23
- Phantom Lady (1954) #5 [1]-4
- The Rider (1957) #3
- Seven Seas Comics (1946) #1-4, 6
  - The Ol' Skipper

=== Editor ===
- Aggie Mack (1948) #8
- All True Romance (1955) #23-24, 27, 30
- Battle Report (1952) #1-3
- Black Cobra (1954) #6
- Bomber Comics (1944) #3
- Bride's Secrets (1954) #9-10, 19
- Ellery Queen (1949) #2
- Fantastic Comics (1954) #11
- The Fighting Man (1952) #1-8
- The Flame (1954) #5 [1]
- G-I in Battle (1952) #8
- Gunsmoke Trail (1957) #2-3
- Haunted Thrills (1952) #3, 10, 12, 17-18
- Lone Eagle (1954) #4
- The Lone Rider (1951) #3, 11, 15, 18, 20
- Lonely Heart (1955) #12
- Men in Action (1957) #1-2, 6
- Midnight (1957) #1-2, 4
- Phantom Lady (1954) #5 [1]-4
- The Rider (1957) #3
- Samson (1955) #12-14
- Secret Love (1957) #2
- Seven Seas Comics (1946) #1-4
- Spitfire Comics (1944) #132
- Spunky the Smiling Spook (1957) #1
- Strange (1957) #1-6
- Strange Fantasy (1952) #2, 4-7, 9-14
- Super Cat (1957) #1
- Swift Arrow (1954) #1-2
- Today's Brides (1955) #4
- Voodoo (1952) #1-6, 8, 10-15, 17, 19
