= Jerry Iger =

American cartoonist (1903–1990)

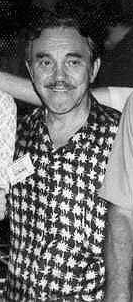
- Born: Samuel Maxwell Iger; August 22, 1903 New York City, U.S.
- Died: September 5, 1990 (aged 87) New York City, U.S.
- Areas: Cartoonist, Writer, Editor, Publisher
- Notable works: Eisner & Iger
- Relatives: Bob Iger (grandnephew)

Samuel Maxwell "Jerry" Iger (/ˈaɪɡər/; August 22, 1903 – September 5, 1990) was an American cartoonist and art-studio entrepreneur. With business partner Will Eisner, he co-founded Eisner & Iger, a comic book packager that produced comics on demand for new publishers during the late-1930s and 1940s period known to fans and historians as the Golden Age of Comic Books.

Iger, no relation to comic-book publisher Fred Iger, was inducted into the Will Eisner Comic Book Hall of Fame in 2009.

== Biography ==
=== Early life and career ===
Jerry Iger was born in New York City, to Austrian-Jewish parents Rosa and Jacob Iger. He was raised in Idabel, Oklahoma, near the Choctaw Indian reservation. The youngest of four children of a peddler who had settled in what was then the pre-statehood Indian Territory, Iger contracted polio as a child and was cared for by his mother. Iger had two sisters, and a brother, Joe, whose son Arthur Iger (b. 1926) would become the father of The Walt Disney Company Chairman and CEO Bob Iger. Arthur by the mid-1970s was vice president and publisher of the educational division of Macmillan Publishing in New York City.

In 1925, Iger, by then living in New York, and despite no formal art training, became a news cartoonist for the New York American. He entered the fledgling comic-book field 10 years later, contributing such one-page humor strips as "Bobby" (whose eponymous character was based on nephew Arthur), "Peewee" and "Happy Daze" to Famous Funnies, one of those seminal American comic books that reprinted black-and-white newspaper strips in color. Iger became founding editor of another such early comic book, Wow, What a Magazine!, which also included some new material. Wow lasted four issues (cover-dated July–Sept. & Nov. 1936) but brought Iger together with a 19-year-old Eisner – future creator of The Spirit – who wrote and drew the Wow adventure strip "Scott Dalton", the pirate strip "The Flame" and the secret agent strip "Harry Karry".

=== Comics packager ===
After Wow folded, Eisner and Iger, anticipating that the well of available reprints would soon run dry, in late 1936 formed Eisner & Iger, one of the first comics packagers that produced outsourced comic-book material for publishers entering the new medium. Eisner & Iger was an immediate success, and the two soon had a stable of creators supplying work to Fox Comics, Fiction House, Quality Comics, and others. Turning a profit of $1.50 a page, Eisner claimed that he "got very rich before I was 22", later detailing that in Depression-era 1939 alone, he and Iger "had split $25,000 between us", a considerable amount for the time.

After Eisner left the firm in 1940, Iger would continue to package comics as the S. M. Iger Studio. In 1945, he took on comics artist/editor Ruth Roche as a partner in the studio, with some sources claiming it then became known as the Roche-Iger Studio.

According to Who's Who of American Comic Books, Iger was co-owner of the Canadian comics publisher Superior from 1945 to c. 1956, and co-owner of the American publisher Ajax-Farrell with Robert W. Farrell from 1946 to 1958. From 1947 to 1954, the Iger Studio packaged comics for Superior, and from 1954 to 1958, it packaged material for Ajax-Farrell's titles. Iger served as art director for Ajax-Farrell until 1957.

Iger also started the small Phoenix Features newspaper syndicate, which in the early 1950s distributed a comic strip of Mickey Spillane's Mike Hammer.

The studio operated until 1961, with Iger then moving to commercial advertising artwork.

=== Later career ===
Iger was a guest of honor at the 1974 New York Comic Art Convention, where he told a panel audience of his plans for an art show to raise money for cancer research, saying his mother had died of the disease. By this time, he made his home in the Sunnyside neighborhood of Queens, New York City.

Blackthorne Publishing has released three compilations of Iger-related comics: The Iger Comics Kingdom (1985); Jerry Iger's Classic Jumbo Comics; and Jerry Iger's Classic National Comics; as well as the six-issue series Jerry Iger's Golden Features (1986).

== Awards ==
Iger was inducted into the Will Eisner Comic Book Hall of Fame in 2009.
