= 1940 in comics =

Notable events of 1940 in comics.

== Events and publications ==
=== Year overall ===
- Another boom year for the burgeoning American comic book industry, as Ace Comics, Columbia Comics, Farrell Publications, Holyoke Publishing, Novelty Press, and Street & Smith Comics all begin publishing.

=== January ===
- January 13: Charles Addams' classic cartoon Downhill Skier is published in The New Yorker, showing a skier magically passing around a tree with each foot on one side.
- Ace Comics (1937 series) #34 – David McKay Publications
- Action Comics (1938 series) #20 – DC Comics
- Adventure Comics (1938 series) #46 – DC Comics
- All-American Comics (1939 series) #10 – DC Comics
- Amazing Mystery Funnies (1938 series) #17 – Centaur Publications
- Daring Mystery Comics (1940 series) #1 – Timely Comics
- Detective Comics (1937 series) #35 – DC Comics
- Double Action Comics (1939 series) #2 – National Periodical Publications, consisting entirely of black and white reprints from early issues of More Fun Comics.
- Fantastic Comics (1939 series) #2 - Fox Feature Syndicate
- Feature Comics (1939 series) #28 – Quality Comics
- Flash Comics (1940 series) #1 – National Periodical Publications. In this issue Gardner Fox and Harry Lampert's The Flash makes his debut, as well as Fox and Dennis Neville's Hawkman.
- Funny Pages (1940 series) #1 (34) - Centaur Publications
- Marvel Mystery Comics (1939 series) #3 – Timely Comics
- More Fun Comics (1936 series) #51 – National Periodical Publications
- Mystery Men Comics (1939 series) #6 – Fox Feature Syndicate
- Smash Comics (1939 series) #6 – Quality Comics
- Teen-Age Romances (1940 series) #1 – St. John Publications debuts January 14
- Wonderworld Comics #9 - Fox Feature Syndicate

=== February ===
- Ace Comics (1937 series) #35 – David McKay Publications
- Action Comics (1938 series) #21 – DC Comics
- Adventure Comics (1938 series) #47 – DC Comics
- All-American Comics (1939 series) #11 – DC Comics
- Daring Mystery Comics (1940 series) #2 – Timely Comics
- Detective Comics (1937 series) #36 – DC Comics
- Fantastic Comics (1939 series) #3 - Fox Feature Syndicate
- Feature Comics (1939 series) #29 – Quality Comics
- Flash Comics (1940 series) #2 – National Periodical Publications
- Marvel Mystery Comics (1939 series) #4 – Timely Comics
- More Fun Comics (1936 series) #52 – National Periodical Publications
- Mystery Men Comics (1939 series) #7 – Fox Feature Syndicate
- Science Comics (1940 series) #1 - Fox Feature Syndicate
- Smash Comics (1939 series) #7 – Quality Comics
- Target Comics (1940 series) #1 - Novelty Press
- Whiz Comics #2, the first appearance of Captain Marvel — Fawcett (This is actually #1 due to Whiz Comics #1 doesn't exist)
- Wonderworld Comics #10 - Fox Feature Syndicate

=== March ===
- Ace Comics (1937 series) #36 – David McKay Publications
- Action Comics (1938 series) #22 – DC Comics
- Adventure Comics (1938 series) #48 – DC Comics
- All-American Comics (1939 series) #12 – DC Comics
- Amazing Mystery Funnies (1938 series) #18 – Centaur Publications
- Detective Comics (1937 series) #37 – DC Comics
- Fantastic Comics (1939 series) #4 - Fox Feature Syndicate
- Feature Comics (1939 series) #30 – Quality Comics
- Flash Comics (1940 series) #3 – National Periodical Publications
- Funny Pages (1940 series) #35 - Centaur Publications
- Marvel Mystery Comics (1939 series) #5 – Timely Comics
- Master Comics (1940 series) #1 – Fawcett Publications
- More Fun Comics (1936 series) #53 – National Periodical Publications
- Mystery Men Comics (1939 series) #8 – Fox Feature Syndicate
- Mystic Comics (1940 series) #1 – Timely Comics
- Science Comics (1940 series) #2 - Fox Feature Syndicate
- Silver Streak Comics (1939 series) #3 — title acquired by Lev Gleason Publications
- Slam-Bang Comics (1940 series) #1 – Fawcett Comics
- Smash Comics (1939 series) #8 – Quality Comics
- Target Comics (1940 series) #2 - Novelty Press
- Whiz Comics #3 – Fawcett Comics (This is actually #2 due to #1 not being published)
- Wonderworld Comics #11 - Fox Feature Syndicate

=== April ===
- Ace Comics (1937 series) #37 – David McKay Publications
- Action Comics (1938 series) #23 – DC Comics
- Adventure Comics (1938 series) #49 – DC Comics
- All-American Comics (1939 series) #13 – DC Comics
- Amazing Mystery Funnies (1938 series) #19 – Centaur Publications
- Batman (1940 series) #1 – DC Comics, first appearance of Joker, first appearance of Catwoman
- Blue Beetle (1939 series) #2 – Fox Feature Syndicate
- Daring Mystery Comics (1940 series) #3 – Timely Comics
- Detective Comics (1937 series) #38 – DC Comics, first appearance of Robin.
- Fantastic Comics (1939 series) #5 - Fox Feature Syndicate
- Feature Comics (1939 series) #31 – Quality Comics
- Flash Comics (1940 series) #4 – National Periodical Publications
- Funny Pages (1940 series) #36 - Centaur Publications
- Marvel Mystery Comics (1939 series) #6 – Timely Comics
- Master Comics (1940 series) #2 – Fawcett Publications
- More Fun Comics (1936 series) #54 – National Periodical Publications
- Mystery Men Comics (1939 series) #9 – Fox Feature Syndicate
- Mystic Comics (1940 series) #2 – Timely Comics
- Science Comics (1940 series) #3 - Fox Feature Syndicate
- Slam-Bang Comics (1940 series) #2 – Fawcett Comics
- Smash Comics (1939 series) #9 – Quality Comics
- Superman (1939 series) #4 – DC Comics
- Target Comics (1940 series) #3 - Novelty Press
- Weird Comics (1940 series) #1 - Fox Feature Syndicate
- Whiz Comics (1940 series) #3 – Fawcett Comics (Numbering will be correct from here on)
- Wonderworld Comics #12 - Fox Feature Syndicate

=== May ===
- May 8: As the Nazis invade Belgium several comics magazines are disestablished forever, including Le Petit Vingtième and Kindervriend.
- May 27: Already a popular Sunday comic since 1934, Alex Raymond's Flash Gordon now also receives a daily comic series, also written by Don W. Moore, but drawn by Austin Briggs. The daily comic will last until 1993.
- Ace Comics (1937 series) #38 – David McKay Publications
- Action Comics (1938 series) #24 – DC Comics
- Adventure Comics (1938 series) #50 – DC Comics
- All-American Comics (1939 series) #14 – DC Comics
- Amazing Mystery Funnies (1938 series) #20 – Centaur Publications
- Crack Comics (1940 series) #1 – Quality Comics (First appearance of Alias the Spider, Madame Fatal, Red Torpedo, and Black Condor)
- Crash Comics Adventures (1940 series) #1 - Helnit Publishing
- Daring Mystery Comics (1940 series) #4 – Timely Comics
- Detective Comics (1937 series) #39 – DC Comics
- Doc Savage Comics (1940 series) #1 – Street & Smith Publications
- Fantastic Comics (1939 series) #6 - Fox Feature Syndicate
- Feature Comics (1939 series) #32 – Quality Comics
- Flash Comics (1940 series) #5 – National Periodical Publications
- Funny Pages (1940 series) #37 - Centaur Publications
- Marvel Mystery Comics (1939 series) #7 – Timely Comics
- Master Comics (1940 series) #3 – Fawcett Comics
- More Fun Comics (1936 series) #55 – National Periodical Publications. In this issue Gardner Fox and Howard Sherman's Doctor Fate makes his debut.
- Mystery Men Comics (1939 series) #10 – Fox Feature Syndicate
- Nickel Comics (1940 series) #1 – Fawcett Comics (First appearance of Bulletman)
- Nickel Comics (1940 series) #2 – Fawcett Comics
- Science Comics (1940 series) #4 - Fox Feature Syndicate
- Slam-Bang Comics (1940 series) #3 – Fawcett Comics
- Smash Comics (1939 series) #10 – Quality Comics
- Target Comics (1940 series) #4 - Novelty Press
- Weird Comics (1940 series) #2 - Fox Feature Syndicate
- Whiz Comics (1940 series) #4 – Fawcett Comics
- Wonderworld Comics #13 - Fox Feature Syndicate

=== June ===
- June 2: First publication of Will Eisner's "The Spirit Section", featuring debuts of the series The Spirit, Lady Luck and Mr. Mystic. In The Spirit both The Spirit and Ebony White make their debuts.
- June 6: The first issue of the Bulgarian comics magazine Chuden Sviat ("Wonderland") is published.
- June 9: In The Spirit by Will Eisner Ellen Dolan makes her debut.
- June 17: Walter B. Gibson's character The Shadow makes his debut as a comics character in a syndicated daily newspaper comic, illustrated by Vernon Greene. The series will run until 13 June 1942.
- Ace Comics (1937 series) #39 – David McKay Publications
- Action Comics (1938 series) #25 – DC Comics
- Adventure Comics (1938 series) #51 – DC Comics
- All-American Comics (1939 series) #15 – DC Comics
- Amazing Mystery Funnies (1938 series) #21 – Centaur Publications
- Crack Comics (1940 series) #2 – Quality Comics
- Crash Comics Adventures (1940 series) #2 - Helnit Publishing
- Daring Mystery Comics (1940 series) #5 – Timely Comics
- Detective Comics (1937 series) #40 – DC Comics
- Fantastic Comics (1939 series) #7 - Fox Feature Syndicate
- Feature Comics (1939 series) #33 – Quality Comics
- Flash Comics (1940 series) #6 – National Periodical Publications
- Funny Pages (1940 series) #38 - Centaur Publications
- Marvel Mystery Comics (1939 series) #8 – Timely Comics
- More Fun Comics (1936 series) #56 – National Periodical Publications
- Mystery Men Comics (1939 series) #11 – Fox Feature Syndicate
- Mystic Comics (1940 series) #3 – Timely Comics
- Nickel Comics (1940 series) #3 – Fawcett Comics
- Nickel Comics (1940 series) #4 – Fawcett Comics
- Science Comics (1940 series) #5 - Fox Feature Syndicate
- Slam-Bang Comics (1940 series) #4 – Fawcett Comics
- Smash Comics (1939 series) #11 – Quality Comics
- Target Comics (1940 series) #5 - Novelty Press
- Weird Comics (1940 series) #3 - Fox Feature Syndicate
- Whirlwind Comics (1940 series) #1 - Nita Publishing
- Whiz Comics (1940 series) #5 – Fawcett Comics
- Wonderworld Comics #14 - Fox Feature Syndicate

=== July ===
- July 7: In Al Capp's Li'l Abner the character Joe Btfsplk makes his debut.
- Ace Comics (1937 series) #40 – David McKay Publications
- Action Comics (1938 series) #26 – DC Comics
- Adventure Comics (1938 series) #52 – DC Comics
- All-American Comics (1939 series) #16 – DC Comics, first appearance of Green Lantern (Alan Scott)
- All-Star Comics (1940 series) #1 – DC Comics
- Amazing Mystery Funnies (1938 series) #22 – Centaur Publications
- Batman (1940 series) #2 – DC Comics
- Blue Beetle (1939 series) #3 – Fox Feature Syndicate
- Crack Comics (1940 series) #3 – Quality Comics
- Crash Comics Adventures (1940 series) #3 - Helnit Publishing
- Detective Comics (1937 series) #41 – DC Comics
- Doc Savage Comics (1940 series) #2 – Street & Smith Publications
- Fantastic Comics (1939 series) #8 - Fox Feature Syndicate
- Feature Comics (1939 series) #34 – Quality Comics
- Flash Comics (1940 series) #7 – National Periodical Publications
- Funny Pages (1940 series) #39 - Centaur Publications
- Hit Comics (1940 series) #1 – Quality Comics
- Green Mask (1940 series) #1 - Fox Feature Syndicate
- Marvel Mystery Comics (1939 series) #9 – Timely Comics
- Master Comics (1940 series) #4 – Fawcett Publications
- More Fun Comics (1936 series) #57 – National Periodical Publications
- Mystery Men Comics (1939 series) #12 – Fox Feature Syndicate
- Nickel Comics (1940 series) #5 – Fawcett Comics
- Nickel Comics (1940 series) #6 – Fawcett Comics
- Science Comics (1940 series) #6 - Fox Feature Syndicate
- Slam-Bang Comics (1940 series) #5 – Fawcett Comics
- Smash Comics (1939 series) #12 – Quality Comics
- Superman (1939 series) #5 – DC Comics
- Target Comics (1940 series) #6 - Novelty Press
- The Flame (1940 series) #1 - Fox Feature Syndicate
- Weird Comics (1940 series) #4 - Fox Feature Syndicate
- Whirlwind Comics (1940 series) #2 - Nita Publishing
- Whiz Comics (1940 series) #6 – Fawcett Comics
- Wonderworld Comics #15 - Fox Feature Syndicate

=== August ===
- August 11: In Bob Karp and Al Taliaferro's Donald Duck comic strip Grandma Duck makes her debut in a framed picture. She will only appear as a character from 27 July 1943 onwards.
- Ace Comics (1937 series) #41 – David McKay Publications
- Action Comics (1938 series) #27 – DC Comics
- Adventure Comics (1938 series) #53 – DC Comics
- All-American Comics (1939 series) #17 – DC Comics
- Amazing Mystery Funnies (1938 series) #23 – Centaur Publications
- Crack Comics (1940 series) #4 – Quality Comics
- Detective Comics (1937 series) #42 – DC Comics
- Fantastic Comics (1939 series) #9 - Fox Feature Syndicate
- Feature Comics (1939 series) #35 – Quality Comics
- Flash Comics (1940 series) #8 – National Periodical Publications
- Funny Pages (1940 series) #40 - Centaur Publications
- Hit Comics (1940 series) #2 – Quality Comics
- Marvel Mystery Comics (1939 series) #10 – Timely Comics
- Master Comics (1940 series) #5 – Fawcett Publications
- More Fun Comics (1936 series) #58 – National Periodical Publications
- Mystery Men Comics (1939 series) #13 – Fox Feature Syndicate
- Mystic Comics (1940 series) #4 – Timely Comics
- Nickel Comics (1940 series) #7 – Fawcett Comics
- Nickel Comics (1940 series) #8 – Fawcett Comics, Final Issue
- Red Raven Comics (1940 series) #1 – Timely Comics
- Rex Dexter of Mars (1940 series) #1 - Fox Feature Syndicate, Only Issue
- Science Comics (1940 series) #7 - Fox Feature Syndicate
- Slam-Bang Comics (1940 series) #6 – Fawcett Comics
- Smash Comics (1939 series) #13 – Quality Comics
- Target Comics (1940 series) #7 - Novelty Press
- Weird Comics (1940 series) #5 - Fox Feature Syndicate
- Whiz Comics (1940 series) #7 – Fawcett Comics
- Wonderworld Comics #16 - Fox Feature Syndicate

=== September ===
- September 1: Ralph Graczak's Our Own Oddities makes its debut. It will run until 1991.
- September 21: The final episode of C. M. Payne's S'Matter, Pop? is published, which had run since 1910.
- September 22: Maurice Cuvillier's Perlin et Pinpin makes its debut.
- Ace Comics (1937 series) #42 – David McKay Publications
- Action Comics (1938 series) #28 – DC Comics
- Adventure Comics (1938 series) #54 – DC Comics
- All-American Comics (1939 series) #18 – DC Comics
- All-Star Comics (1940 series) #2 – DC Comics
- Amazing Mystery Funnies (1938 series) #24, last issue – Centaur Publications
- Batman (1940 series) #3 – DC Comics
- Big 3 (1940 series) #1 – Fox Feature Syndicate
- Blue Beetle (1939 series) #4 – Fox Feature Syndicate
- Crack Comics (1940 series) #5 – Quality Comics
- Crash Comics Adventures (1940 series) #4 - Helnit Publishing
- Daring Mystery Comics (1940 series) #6 – Timely Comics
- Detective Comics (1937 series) #43 – DC Comics
- Fantastic Comics (1939 series) #10 - Fox Feature Syndicate
- Feature Comics (1939 series) #36 – Quality Comics
- Flash Comics (1940 series) #9 – National Periodical Publications
- Funny Pages (1940 series) #41 - Centaur Publications
- Hit Comics (1940 series) #3 - Quality Comics
- Marvel Mystery Comics (1939 series) #11 – Timely Comics
- Master Comics (1940 series) #6 – Fawcett Publications
- More Fun Comics (1936 series) #59 – National Periodical Publications
- Mystery Men Comics (1939 series) #14 – Fox Feature Syndicate
- Science Comics (1940 series) #8 - Fox Feature Syndicate, Final Issue
- Slam-Bang Comics (1940 series) #7 – Fawcett Comics, Final Issue
- Smash Comics (1939 series) #14 – Quality Comics
- Target Comics (1940 series) #8 - Novelty Press
- Weird Comics (1940 series) #6 - Fox Feature Syndicate
- Whirlwind Comics (1940 series) #3 - Nita Publishing, Final Issue
- Whiz Comics (1940 series) #8 – Fawcett Comics
- Wonderworld Comics #17 - Fox Feature Syndicate

=== October ===
- October 17: The first issue of the short-lived Walloon children's comics magazine Le Soir-Jeunesse, a supplement of the Nazi-controlled Le Soir, is published. It will run until 23 September 1941. In its first issue Hergé's Tintin story The Crab with the Golden Claws is prepublished. Halfway the story Allan Thompson and Captain Haddock make their debut. (In later republications of older Tintin albums Thompson would be retroactively introduced in the older story Cigars of the Pharaoh (1933).)
- October 26: The Italian Disney comics magazine Donald Duck and Other Adventures (Paperino e altre avventure) merges with another Italian Disney magazine, Topolino.
- The first issue of the Belgian comic magazine Aventures Illustrées (later renamed Bimbo) is published. It will run until 1942, when the Nazis ban it.
- Ace Comics (1937 series) #43 – David McKay Publications
- Action Comics (1938 series) #29 – DC Comics
- Adventure Comics (1938 series) #55 – DC Comics
- All-American Comics (1939 series) #19 – DC Comics
- Crack Comics (1940 series) #6 – Quality Comics
- Detective Comics (1937 series) #44 – DC Comics
- Fantastic Comics (1939 series) #11 - Fox Feature Syndicate
- Feature Comics (1939 series) #37 – Quality Comics
- Flash Comics (1940 series) #10 – National Periodical Publications
- Funny Pages (1940 series) #42 - Centaur Publications, Final Issue
- Green Mask (1940 series) #2 - Fox Feature Syndicate
- Hit Comics (1940 series) #4 – Quality Comics
- Human Torch Comics (1940 series) #2 – Timely Comics (Human Torch Comics took over for Red Raven Comics)
- Marvel Mystery Comics (1939 series) #12 – Timely Comics
- Master Comics (1940 series) #7 – Fawcett Publications
- More Fun Comics (1936 series) #60 – National Periodical Publications
- Mystery Men Comics (1939 series) #15 – Fox Feature Syndicate
- Samson (1940 series) #1 - Fox Feature Syndicate
- Smash Comics (1939 series) #15 – Quality Comics
- Superman (1939 series) #6 – DC Comics
- Target Comics (1940 series) #9 - Novelty Press
- The Flame (1940 series) #2 - Fox Feature Syndicate
- Weird Comics (1940 series) #7 - Fox Feature Syndicate
- Whiz Comics (1940 series) #9 – Fawcett Comics
- Wonderworld Comics #18 - Fox Feature Syndicate

=== November ===
- November 4: In Bob Karp and Al Taliaferro's Donald Duck newspaper comic Daisy Duck makes her debut as a comics character, having made her screen debut in the animated short Don Donald six months earlier.
- Ace Comics (1937 series) #44 – David McKay Publications
- Action Comics (1938 series) #30 – DC Comics
- Adventure Comics (1938 series) #56 – DC Comics
- All-American Comics (1939 series) #20 – DC Comics
- All-Star Comics (1940 series) #3 – DC Comics. In this issue Gardner Fox and Sheldon Mayer introduce Justice Society.
- Batman (1940 series) #4 – DC Comics
- Blue Beetle (1939 series) #5 – Fox Feature Syndicate
- Crack Comics (1940 series) #7 – Quality Comics
- Crash Comics Adventures (1940 series) #5 - Helnit Publishing, Final Issue
- Detective Comics (1937 series) #45 – DC Comics
- Fantastic Comics (1939 series) #12 - Fox Feature Syndicate
- Feature Comics (1939 series) #38 – Quality Comics
- Flash Comics (1940 series) #11 – National Periodical Publications
- Hit Comics (1940 series) #5 – Quality Comics
- Marvel Mystery Comics (1939 series) #13 – Timely Comics
- Master Comics (1940 series) #8 – Fawcett Publications
- More Fun Comics (1936 series) #61 – National Periodical Publications
- Mystery Men Comics (1939 series) #16 – Fox Feature Syndicate
- Smash Comics (1939 series) #16 – Quality Comics
- Target Comics (1940 series) #10 - Novelty Press
- Weird Comics (1940 series) #8 - Fox Feature Syndicate
- Whiz Comics (1940 series) #10 – Fawcett Comics
- Wonderworld Comics #19 - Fox Feature Syndicate
- Wow Comics (1940 series) #1 – Fawcett Comics (First appearance of Mister Scarlet)

=== December ===
- December 19: The Flemish comics magazine Bravo! launches a French-language sister magazine. It will run until 17 April 1951.
- December 20: Captain America and Bucky Barnes debut in Captain America Comics #1, cover-dated Spring 1941.
- Ace Comics (1937 series) #45 – David McKay Publications
- Action Comics (1938 series) #31 – DC Comics
- Adventure Comics (1938 series) #57 – DC Comics
- All-American Comics (1939 series) #21 – DC Comics
- Big 3 (1940 series) #2 – Fox Feature Syndicate
- Crack Comics (1940 series) #8 – Quality Comics
- Detective Comics (1937 series) #46 – DC Comics
- Fantastic Comics (1939 series) #13 - Fox Feature Syndicate
- Feature Comics (1939 series) #39 – Quality Comics
- Flash Comics (1940 series) #12 – National Periodical Publications
- Green Hornet Comics (1940 series) #1 - Helnit Publishing
- Green Mask (1940 series) #3 - Fox Feature Syndicate
- Hit Comics (1940 series) #6 – Quality Comics
- Marvel Mystery Comics (1939 series) #14 – Timely Comics
- Master Comics (1940 series) #9 – Fawcett Publications°
- More Fun Comics (1936 series) #62 – National Periodical Publications
- Mystery Men Comics (1939 series) #17 – Fox Feature Syndicate
- Samson (1940 series) #2 - Fox Feature Syndicate
- Smash Comics (1939 series) #17 – Quality Comics
- Spy Smasher (1940 series) #1 – Fawcett Publications
- Superman (1939 series) #7 – DC Comics
- Target Comics (1940 series) #11 - Novelty Press
- The Flame (1940 series) #3 - Fox Feature Syndicate
- Weird Comics (1940 series) #9 - Fox Feature Syndicate
- Whiz Comics (1940 series) #11 – Fawcett Comics
- Wonderworld Comics #20 - Fox Feature Syndicate

=== Specials ===
- Mutt & Jeff (1939 series) #2 – All-American Comics
- New York World's Fair Comics (1939 series) #2 – National Periodical Publications
- Special Edition Comics #1- Fawcett Publications

== Births ==
=== January ===
- January 26: Gonzalo Mayo, Peruvian comics artist (worked for Eerie and Vampirella), (d. 2021).

=== April ===
- April 17: Claire Bretécher, French cartoonist.

=== October ===
- October 20: Nikita Mandryka, French comics artist (Le Concombre Masqué, Les Clopinettes) and publisher (co-founder of L'Écho des Savanes), (d. 2021).

=== Specific date unknown ===
- Antonio Correa Expósito, Spanish comics artist, (d. 2003).

== Deaths ==
=== January ===
- January 15: Henri Verstijnen, Dutch comics artist and philosopher (Spitsmuis en Tapir), dies at age 57.
- January 19: Luc Leguey, French illustrator and comics artist (various picture stories for advertising companies and children's magazines), dies at age 64.

=== February ===
- February 27: Johan Braakensiek, Dutch illustrator, painter, graphic artist, political cartoonist and comics artist (Dik Trom), dies at age 81.

=== May ===
- May 25: William Conselman, American screenwriter and comics writer (Ella Cinders, Good Time Guy), dies at age 43.

=== June ===
- June 3: Charles R. Snelgrove, Canadian comics artist (Robin Hood and Company), dies at age 47.
- June 21: Tjerk Bottema, Dutch caricaturist, political cartoonist, illustrator and comics artist (made some political comics), dies at age 58.

=== July ===
- July 20: Harry E. Homan, American comics artist (Billy Make Believe, How to Make It, assisted on Joe Jinks), dies at age 51 from a heart attack.
- July 28: Gerda Wegener, Danish graphic designer, painter, illustrator and comics artist (erotic comics), dies at age 47 or 51.

=== September ===
- September 28: Earl Hurd, American animator and comics artist (Trials of Elder Mouse, Brick Bodkin's Pa, Susie Sunshine, Bobby Bumps), dies at age 60.

=== October ===
- October 4: Tom Wood, American illustrator and comics artist (Disney comics), dies at age 53 from injuries in a car accident.
- October 15: Georges Léonnec, French comics artist and illustrator, dies at age 59.
- October 16: G. Ri, A.K.A. Victor Mousselet, French illustrator and comic artist (early science fiction comics), dies at age 87.

=== November ===
- November 9: Nikola Navojev, Yugoslavian comics artist (Tarcaneta, Vukadin, Zigomar, illegal versions of Mickey Mouse), dies at age 27 from tuberculosis.
- November 16: Albert Engström, Swedish novelist and comics artist (Kolingen, Bobban), dies at age 71.

=== December ===
- December 5:
  - Juan Arthenack, Mexican comic artist (Don Prudencio, Adelaido el Conquistador), dies at age 48 or 49.
  - Jos Wins, Dutch painter and comic artist (Joco en Coco), dies at age 59.

=== Specific date unknown ===
- Lucien Haye, French illustrator and comics artist (L'Homme Aux Cent Visages, Le Prince Kama), died at age 73 or 74.
- Karl Pommerhanz, German-Austrian illustrator and comics artist (made comics for Fliegende Blätter and the Chicago Tribune), dies at age 82 or 83.
- Émile Tap, French illustrator, caricaturist and comic artist (Sam et Sap), dies at age 62 or 63.

== First issues by title ==
- All Star Comics (Summer, All-American Publications)
- Batman (Spring, DC Comics.)
- Big 3 (September, Fox Feature Syndicate)
- Big Shot Comics (May, Columbia Comics)
- Crack Comics (May, Quality Comics)
- Crash Comics Adventures (May, Helnit Publishing)
- Daring Mystery Comics (January, Timely Comics)
- Doc Savage Comics (Street & Smith Publications)
- Flash Comics (January, National Periodical Publications)
- Green Hornet (December, Helnit)
- Green Mask (July, Fox Feature Syndicate)
- Jackpot Comics (Spring, MLJ Magazines, Inc.)
- Master Comics (March, Fawcett Publications)
- Red Raven Comics (August, Timely Comics)
- Samson (October, Fox Feature Syndicate)
- Science Comics (February, Fox Feature Syndicate)
- Shield-Wizard Comics (Summer, MLJ Magazines, Inc.)
- Slam-Bang Comics (March, Fawcett Comics)
- Spy Smasher (December, Fawcett Publications)
- Target Comics (February, Novelty Press)
- The Flame (July, Fox Feature Syndicate)
- Walt Disney's Comics and Stories (October, Dell Comics)
- Weird Comics (April, Fox Feature Syndicate)
- Whirlwind Comics (June, Nita Publishing)
- Whiz Comics (February, Fawcett Comics)
- Wow Comics (Winter, Fawcett Comics)
- Zip Comics (June, MLJ Magazines, Inc.)

== Initial appearances by character name ==
- Atom (Al Pratt) in All-American Comics #19 (October), created by Ben Flinton and Bill O'Connor, published by National Periodical Publications
- Black Condor in Crack Comics #1 (May), created by Will Eisner and Lou Fine, published by Quality Comics
- Black Pirate (Jon Valor) in Action Comics #23 (April), created by Sheldon Moldoff, Published by DC Comics
- Breeze Barton in Daring Mystery Comics #3 (April), created by Jack Binder and E. C. Stoner, published by Timely Comics
- Bulletman in Nickel Comics #1 (May), created by Bill Parker and Jon Smalle, published by Fawcett Comics
- Bulletgirl in Nickel Comics #1 (May), created by Bill Parker and Jon Smalle, published by Fawcett Comics
- Shazam (DC Comics) in Whiz Comics #2 (February), created by C. C. Beck and Bill Parker, published by Fawcett Comics
- Captain Bob Strong in Daring Mystery Comics #3 (April), created by Jack Alderman, published by Timely Comics
- Catwoman in Batman #1 (Spring), created by Bill Finger and Bob Kane, published by DC Comics
- Clayface (Basil Karlo) in Detective Comics #40 (June), created by Bill Finger and Bob Kane. published by DC Comics
- Congo Bill in More Fun Comics #56, created by Whitney Ellsworth and George Papp. published by DC Comics
- Cyclotron (character) in Action Comics #21 (February), created by Jerry Siegel and Joe Shuster, published by DC Comics
- Dennis Burton in Daring Mystery Comics #2 (February), created by Will Harr, published by Timely Comics
- Doctor Fate (Kent Nelson) in More Fun Comics #55 (May), created by Gardner Fox and artist Howard Sherman, published by National Periodical Publications
- Doctor Hormone in Popular Comics #54 (August), published by Dell Comics
- Doctor Sivana in Whiz Comics #2 (February), created by Bill Parker and C. C. Beck, published by Fawcett Comics
- Dynaman in Daring Mystery Comics #6 (September), created by Steve Dahlman, published by Timely Comics
- Falcon (Carl Burgess) in Daring Mystery Comics #5 (June), created by Maurice Gutwirth, published by Timely Comics
- Fiery Mask in Daring Mystery Comics #1 (January), created by Joe Simon, published by Timely Comics
- Flash (Jay Garrick) in Flash Comics #1 (January), created by Gardner Fox and Harry Lampert, published by National Periodical Publications
- Flash Foster in Daring Mystery Comics #1 (January), created by Bob Wood, published by Timely Comics
- Green Lantern (Alan Scott) in All-American Comics #16 (July), created by Martin Nodell, published by National Periodical Publications
- Hawkgirl (Shiera Sanders) in Flash Comics #1 (January), Created by Gardner Fox and Denis Neville, published by National Periodical Publications
- Hawkman (Carter Hall) in Flash Comics #1 (January), created by Gardner Fox and Dennis Neville, published by National Periodical Publications
- Hourman (Rex Tyler) in Adventure Comics #48 (March), created by Ken Fitch and Bernard Baily, published by DC Comics
- Hugo Strange in Detective Comics #36 (February), created by Bill Finger and Bob Kane, published by DC Comics
- Ibis the Invincible in Whiz Comics #2 (February), created by Bob Kingett, published by Fawcett Comics
- Inza Nelson in More Fun Comics #55 (May), created by Gardner Fox, published by DC Comics
- John Steele in Daring Mystery Comics #1 (January), created Dean Carr, published by Timely Comics
- Johnny Thunder in Flash Comics #1 (January), created by John Wentworth and Stan Aschmeier, published by DC Comics
- Joker (character) in Batman #1 (Spring), created by Jerry Robinson (concept), Bill Finger, and Bob Kane, published by DC Comics
- Justice Society of America in All Star Comics #3 (Winter), created by Sheldon Mayer and Gardner Fox, published by DC Comics
- King Standish in Flash Comics #3 (March), created by Gardner Fox, published by DC Comics
- Kulak (DC Comics) in All Star Comics #2 (September), created by Gardner Fox, published by DC Comics
- Lex Luthor in Action Comics #23 (April), created by Jerry Siegel and Joe Shuster, published by DC Comics
- Magno (Quality Comics) in Smash Comics #13 (August), created by Paul Gustavson, published by Quality Comics
- Marvex the Super-Robot in Daring Mystery Comics #3 (March), created by Hal Sharp, published by Timely Comics
- Max Mercury in National Comics #5 (November), created by Jack Cole and Chuck Mazoujian, published by Quality Comics
- Mister E in Daring Mystery Comics #2 (February), created by Joe Cal Cagno, published by Timely Comics
- Monako in Daring Mystery Comics #1 (January), created Larry Antonette, published by Timely Comics
- Neon the Unknown in Hit Comics #1 (July), created by Jerry Iger, published by Quality Comics
- Phantom Bullet in Daring Mystery Comics #2 (February), created by Joe Simon, published by Timely Comics
- Phantom Reporter in Daring Mystery Comics #3 (April), created by Robert O. Erisman, published by Timely Comics
- Perry White in Superman #7 (November), created by Jerry Siegel and Joe Shuster, published by DC Comics
- Ray (DC Comics) in Smash Comics #14 (September), created by Lou Fine, published by Quality Comics
- Red Bee in Hit Comics #1 (July), created by Tony Blum and Charles Nicholas, published by Quality Comics
- Red Tornado (Ma Hunkel) in All-American Comics #20 (November), created by Sheldon Mayer, published by DC Comics
- Red Torpedo in Crack Comics #1 (May), created by Will Eisner, published by Quality Comics
- Robin (Dick Grayson) in Detective Comics #38 (April), created by Jerry Robinson (concept), Bill Finger, and Bob Kane, published by DC Comics
- Silver Streak in Silver Streak Comics #3 (March), created by Joe Simon, published by Lev Gleason Publications
- Spider (DC Comics) in Crack Comics #1 (May), created by Paul Gustavson, published by Quality Comics
- Spirit (comics) in Register and Tribune Syndicate (June), created by Will Eisner, published by Eisner & Iger
- Spy Smasher in Whiz Comics #2 (February), created by C. C. Beck and Bill Parker, published by Fawcett Comics
- The Spectre (Jim Corrigan) in More Fun Comics #52 (February), created by Jerry Siegel and Bernard Baily, published by National Periodical Publications
- Uncle Sam (comics) in National Comics #1 (July), created by Will Eisner, published by Quality Comics
- Wizard Shazam in Whiz Comics #2 (February), created by C. C. Beck and Bill Parker, published by Fawcett Comics
- Wotan (comics) in More Fun Comics #55 (May), created by Gardner Fox and Howard Sherman, published by DC Comics
- Zachary Zor in More Fun Comics #55 (May), created by Jerry Siegel, published by DC Comics
