= List of Fox Feature Syndicate publications =

This is a list of Fox Feature Syndicate publications.

== Titles ==
=== A ===
- Album of Crime, one non-numbered issue (1949)
- All Famous Crime, one non-numbered issue (1949)
- All Good Comics, one non-numbered issue (1944); #1 (1946)
- All Great Comics, one non-numbered issue (1944); one non-numbered issue (1945); #1, 14, 13 (1946; becomes Dagar, Desert Hawk with 2nd #14 onward)
- All Great Jungle Adventures, one non-numbered issue (1949)
- All Real Confession Magazine, one non-numbered issue (1949)
- All Top Comics one non-numbered issue (1944); #1-18 (1945-1949; My Experience #19 onward)
- All Your Comics, one non-numbered issue (1944); #1 (1946)
- Almanac of Crime, two non-numbered issues (1949)
- Animal Crackers #31 (1950; formerly My Love Secret

=== B ===
- Big Three #1-7 (1940-1942)
- Blue Beetle #1-11, 31-42, 44-69 (1939-1950; #12-30 published by Holyoke Publishing; no #43)
- Book of All-Comics one non-numbered issue (1945)
- The Book of Comics #1 (1945)
- The Bouncer, non-numbered first issue, #11-14 (1944-1945) [continued from The Green Mask v1]

=== C ===
- Captain Kidd #24-25 (1949; formerly Dagar, Desert Hawk)
- Cody of the Pony Express #1 (1950)
- Colossal Features Magazine #33-34, issue numbering restarts, #3 (1950; formerly I Loved)
- Cosmo Cat #1-10 (1946-1947; becomes Sunny, America's Sweetheart #11 onward)
- Crimes Incorporated #12 (1950; formerly My Past); issue numbering restarts, Crime Incorporated #2-3 (1950-1951)
- Crimes By Women #1-15 (1948-1950)

=== D ===
- Dagar, Desert Hawk #14-23 (1948-1949; formerly All Great Comics, 1946 series; Captain Kidd #24 onward)
- Dorothy Lamour, Jungle Princess #2-3 (1950; formerly Jungle Lil)

=== E ===
- The Eagle #1-4 (July 1941 - Jan. 1942)
- Everybody's Comics, one non-numbered issue (1944)

=== F ===
- Famous Crimes #1-20 (1948-1951)
- Fantastic Comics #1-23 (Dec. 1939 - Nov. 1941)
- Feature Presentations Magazine #5-6; issue numbering restarts, Feature Stories Magazine #3-4 (1950; formerly Women in Love)
- The Flame #1-8 (1940-1942)
- Free Weekly Comics, three non-numbered issues (1940)
- Frank Buck, #70-71; issue numbering restarts, #3 (1950; formerly My True Love)
- Full Color Comics, one non-numbered issue (1946)

=== G ===
- General Douglas MacArthur, one non-numbered issue (1951)
- The Green Mask v1 #1-9 (1940–1942), continued as The Bouncer
- The Green Mask v1 #10–11 (1944)
- Green Mask v2 #1–6 (1945–1946)

=== H ===
- Hoot Gibson #5-6; issue numbering restarts, #3 (1950; formerly My Love Story)
- Hoot Gibson's Western Roundup, one non-numbered issue (1950)
- Hunted #13; issue numbering restarts, #2 (1950; formerly My Love Memoirs)

=== I ===
- I Loved #28-32 (1949-1950; formerly Rulah, Jungle Goddess; Colossal Features Magazine #33 onward)
- Inside Crime #3; issue numbering restarts, #2 (1950; formerly My Intimate Affair)

=== J ===
- Jo-Jo Comics #1-6 (1946-1947; becomes Jo-Jo, Congo King #7 onward)
- Jo-Jo, Congo King #7-29 (1947-1949; two #7s, no #13; formerly Jo-Jo Comics; My Desire #30 onward)
- Journal of Crime, one non-numbered issue (1949)
- Judy Canova #23-24; issue numbering restarts, #3 (1950; formerly My Experience)
- Jungle Jo, one non-numbered issue, #1-6 (1950)
- Jungle Lil #1 (1950; Dorothy Lamour, Jungle Princess #2 onward)
- Junior Comics #9-16 (1947-1948; formerly Li'l Pan; becomes Western Outlaws #17 onward)

=== K ===
- Krazy Life #1 (1945)

=== L ===
- Li'l Pan #6-8 (1946-1947; formerly Rocket Kelly; Junior Comics #9 onward)
- Life with Snarky Parker #1 (1950)

=== M ===
- March of Crime, three non-numbered issues (1948); #7; issue numbering restarts, #2-3 (1950; formerly My Love Affair)
- Martin Kane Private Eye #4; issue numbering restarts, #2 (1950; formerly My Secret Affair)
- Meet Corliss Archer #1-3 (1948; My Life #4 onward)
- Murder Incorporated #1-15 (1948-1949; My Private Life #16 onward); #5; issue numbering restarts, #2-3 (1950; formerly My Desire)
- My Confession #7-10 (1949-1950; formerly Western True Crime; Spectacular Feature Magazine #11 onward)
- My Desire #30-31; issue numbering restarts, #3-4 (1949-1950; formerly Jo-Jo Congo King; Murder Incorporated, 1950 series, #5 onward)
- My Experience #19-22 (1949-1950; formerly All Top Comics; Judy Canova #23 onward)
- My Great Love #1-4 (1949-1950; Will Rogers Western #5 onward)
- My Intimate Affair #1-2 (1950; Inside Crime #3 onward)
- My Life True Stories in Pictures #4-15 (1948-1950; formerly Meet Corliss Archer)
- My Love Affair #1-6 (1949-1950; March of Crime, 1950 series, #7 onward)
- My Love Life #6-13 (1949-1950; formerly Zegra, Jungle Empress)
- My Love Memoirs #9-12 (1949-1950; Hunted #13 onward)
- My Love Secret #24-30 (1949-1950; formerly Phantom Lady; Animal Crackers #31 onward)
- My Love Story #1-4 (1949-1950; Hoot Gibson #5 onward)
- My Past Thrilling Confessions #7-11 (1949-1950; formerly Western Thrillers; Crimes, Inc. #12 onward)
- My Private Life #16-17 (1950; formerly Murder Incorporated, 1948 series; Pedro #18 onward)
- My Secret Affair #1-3 (1949-1950; Martin Kane #4 onward)
- My Secret Life #22-27 (1949-1950; formerly Western Outlaws)
- My Secret Romance #1-2 (1950; A Star Presentation #3 onward)
- My Secret Story #26-29 (1950; formerly Captain Kidd; Sabu, Elephant Boy #30 onward)
- My Story #5-12 (1949-1950; formerly Zago, Jungle Prince
- My True Love: #65-69 (1949-1950; formerly Western Killers; Frank Buck #70 onward)
- Mystery Men Comics #1-31 (Aug. 1939 - Feb. 1942)

=== P ===
- Pedro #18; issue numbering restarts, #2 (1950; formerly My Private Life)
- Phantom Lady #13-23 (1947-1949; formerly Wotalife Comics; My Love Secret #24 onward)

=== R ===
- Range Busters #1 (1950)
- Real Hit Comics #1 (1944)
- Rex Dexter of Mars #1 (Fall 1940)
- Ribtickler #1-9 (1945-1947)
- Rocket Kelly, one non-numbered issue (1944); #1-5 (1945-1946)
- Rocket Ship X #1 (1951)
- Romantic Thrills, one non-numbered issue (1950)
- Romeo Tubbs #26-28 (1950; formerly My Secret Life)
- Rulah, Jungle Goddess #17-27 (1948-1949; formerly Zoot Comics; I Loved #28 onward)

=== S ===
- Sabu, Elephant Boy #30; issue numbering restarts, #2 (1950; formerly My Secret Story)
- Samson #1-6 (Fall 1940 - Sept. 1941)
- Science Comics #1-8 (Feb. - Sept. 1940)
- Secret Love Stories, one non-numbered issue (1949)
- Spectacular Features Magazine #11-13 (1950; formerly My Confession)
- Spectacular Stories Magazine #4 (1950)
- A Star Presentation #3 (1950; formerly My Secret Romance; Spectacular Stories Magazine #4 onward)
- Sunny, America's Sweetheart #11-14 (1947-1948; formerly Cosmo Cat)

=== T ===
- Tegra, Jungle Empress #1 (1948; Zega, Jungle Empress #2 onward)

=== U ===
- U.S. Jones #1-2 (Nov. 1941- Jan. 1942)

=== V ===
- V...- Comics #1-2 (Jan. 1942- March 1942)
- Variety Comics, two non-numbered issues (1946)

=== W ===
- Weird Comics #1-20 (April 1940 - Jan. 1942)
- Western Killers #60-64 (1948-1949; My True Love #65 onward)
- Western Outlaws #17-21 (1948-1949; formerly Junior Comics; My Secret Life #22 onward)
- Western Thrillers #1-6 (1948-1949; My Past Confessions #7 onward)
- Western True Crime #1-6 (1948-1949)
- Will Rogers Western #5; issue numbering restarts, #2 (1950; formerly My Great Love)
- Women in Love #1-4 (1949-1950; A Feature Presentation #5 onward)
- Women Outlaws #1-8 (1948-1949; My Love Memories #9 onward)
- Wonder Comics (changed to Wonderworld Comics, #3-on) #1-33 (May 1939 - Jan. 1942)
- Wotalife Comics #3-12 (1946-1947; Phantom Lady #13 onward)

=== Z ===
- Zago, Jungle Prince #1-4 (1948-1949; My Story #5 onward)
- Zegra, Jungle Empress #2-5 (1948-1949; formerly Tegra, Jungle Empress; My Love Life #6 onward)
- Zoot Comics #1-16 (1946-1948; Rulah, Jungle Goddess #17 onward)
