= 1939 in comics =

Notable events of 1939 in comics.

== Events and publications ==
=== January ===
- Ace Comics (1937 series) #22 – David McKay Publications
- Action Comics (1938 series) #8 – National Allied Publications
- Adventure Comics (1938 series) #34 – National Allied Publications
- Amazing Mystery Funnies (1938 series) #5 – Centaur Publications
- Detective Comics (1937 series) #23 – National Allied Publications
- Feature Funnies (1937 series) #16 – Comic Favorites, Inc.
- Funny Picture Stories (1939 series) #1 - Centaur Publications
- More Fun Comics (1936 series) #39 – National Periodical Publications
- Star Ranger Funnies (1939 series) #1 - Centaur Publications

=== February ===
- Ace Comics #23 – David McKay Publications
- Action Comics #9 – National Allied Publications
- Adventure Comics #35 – National Allied Publications
- Amazing Mystery Funnies #6 – Centaur Publications
- Detective Comics #24 – National Allied Publications
- Feature Funnies #17 – Comic Favorites, Inc.
- Funny Pages (1939 series) #1 (24) - Centaur Publications
- More Fun Comics #40 – National Periodical Publications
- Star Comics (1939 series) #1 - Centaur Publications

=== March ===
- 15 March: DC Comics files a lawsuit against Fox Feature Syndicate for copyright infringement of Superman by Fox’s character Wonder Man first appearing in Wonder Comics #1 (May 1939). In 1940 DC won the suit and Fox was forced to stop using the Wonder Man character. He only appeared in Wonder Comics #1. In 1964 Marvel Comics would introduce their Wonder Man with no association with Fox’s character.
- Ace Comics #24 – David McKay Publications
- Action Comics #10 – National Allied Publications
- Adventure Comics #36 – National Allied Publications
- Amazing Mystery Funnies #7 – Centaur Publications
- Detective Comics #25 – National Allied Publications
- Feature Funnies #18 – Comic Favorites, Inc.
- Funny Pages (1939 series) #2 (25) - Centaur Publications
- Funny Picture Stories (1939 series) #2 - Centaur Publications
- More Fun Comics #41 – National Periodical Publications
- Star Comics (1939 series) #2 - Centaur Publications

=== April ===
- Ace Comics #25 – David McKay Publications
- Action Comics #11 – National Allied Publications
- Adventure Comics #37 – National Allied Publications
- All-American Comics #1 – All-American Publications
- Amazing Mystery Funnies #8 – Centaur Publications
- Detective Comics #26 – National Allied Publications
- Feature Funnies #19 – Comic Favorites, Inc.
- Funny Pages (1939 series) #3 (26) - Centaur Publications
- More Fun Comics #42 – National Periodical Publications
- Movie Comics (1939 series) #1 – National Periodical Publications
- Star Comics (1939 series) #3 - Centaur Publications
- Star Ranger Funnies (1939 series) #2 - Centaur Publications

=== May ===
- May 20: In Floyd Gottfredson's Mickey Mouse comic strip the villain Phantom Blot and the policeman Chief O'Hara make their debut; in the story Outwits the Phantom Blot.
- Ace Comics #26 – David McKay Publications
- Action Comics #12 – National Allied Publications
- Adventure Comics #38 – National Allied Publications
- All-American Comics #2 – All-American Publications
- Amazing Mystery Funnies #9 – Centaur Publications
- Detective Comics #27 – National Allied Publications – First appearance of Batman
- Feature Funnies #20 – Comic Favorites, Inc.
- Funny Picture Stories (1939 series) #3 - Centaur Publications, Final Issue
- More Fun Comics #43 – National Periodical Publications
- Movie Comics #2 – National Periodical Publications
- Star Comics (1939 series) #4 - Centaur Publications
- Wonder Comics #1 - Fox Feature Syndicate

=== June ===
- Ace Comics #27 – David McKay Publications
- Action Comics #13 – National Allied Publications
- Adventure Comics #39 – National Allied Publications
- All-American Comics #3 – National Allied Publications
- Amazing Mystery Funnies #10 – Centaur Publications
- Detective Comics #28 – National Allied Publications
- Feature Comics (previously Feature Funnies) #21 – Quality Comics
- Funny Pages (1939 series) #4 (27) - Centaur Publications
- More Fun Comics #44 – National Periodical Publications
- Movie Comics #3 – National Periodical Publications
- Star Comics (1939 series) #5 - Centaur Publications
- Star Ranger Funnies (1939 series) #3 - Centaur Publications
- Superman (1939 series) #1, cover dated Summer – National Periodical Publications
- Wonder Comics #2 - Fox Feature Syndicate

=== July ===
- 1 July: Fox Feature Syndicate renames Wonder Comics to Wonderworld Comics starting with issue #3.
- Ace Comics #28 – David McKay Publications
- Action Comics #14 – National Allied Publications
- Adventure Comics #40 – National Allied Publications. In this issue Gardner Fox, Bert Christman, Ogden Whitney and Creig Flessel's The Sandman makes his debut.
- All-American Comics #4 – All-American Publications
- Amazing Mystery Funnies #11 – Centaur Publications
- Detective Comics #29 – National Allied Publications. In this issue Gardner Fox introduces Batman's utility belt in Batman by Bill Finger and Bob Kane.
- Feature Comics #22 – Quality Comics
- Funny Pages (1939 series) #5 (28) - Centaur Publications
- More Fun Comics #45 – National Periodical Publications
- Movie Comics #4 – National Periodical Publications
- Star Comics (1939 series) #6 - Centaur Publications
- The Magic Comic #1 – D. C. Thomson & Co.
- Wonderworld Comics #3 - Fox Feature Syndicate, Will Eisner and Jerry Iger's The Flame makes his debut.

=== August ===
- Ace Comics #29 – David McKay Publications
- Action Comics #15 – National Allied Publications
- Adventure Comics #41 – National Allied Publications
- All-American Comics #5 – All-American Publications
- Amazing Mystery Funnies #12 – Centaur Publications
- Detective Comics #30 – National Allied Publications
- Feature Comics #23 – Quality Comics
- Funny Pages (1939 series) #6 (29) - Centaur Publications
- More Fun Comics #46 – National Periodical Publications
- Movie Comics #5 – National Periodical Publications
- Mystery Men Comics #1 (1939 series) – Fox Feature Syndicate – First appearance of Blue Beetle
- Star Comics (1939 series) #7 - Centaur Publications, Final Issue
- Star Ranger Funnies (1939 series) #4 - Centaur Publications
- Smash Comics #1 (1939 series) – Quality Comics
- Wonderworld Comics #4 - Fox Feature Syndicate

=== September ===
- 28 September: on Le Petit Vingtième, first chapter of Land of Black Gold by Hergé; the story will be unfinished because the war.
- Newspaper strip Ben Bowyang by Alex Gurney begins publication
- Ace Comics #30 – David McKay Publications
- Action Comics #16 – National Allied Publications
- Adventure Comics #42 – National Allied Publications
- All-American Comics #6 – All-American Publications
- Amazing Man Comics (1939 series) #5 – Centaur Publications
- Amazing Mystery Funnies #13 – Centaur Publications
- Detective Comics #31 – National Allied Publications. In this issue Gardner Fox introduces the Batarang in Batman by Bob Kane and Bill Finger.
- Feature Comics #24 – Quality Comics
- Four Color Series 1 (1939 series) #1 – Dell Publishing
  - First comic-book appearance of Dick Tracy, who was already a popular feature in newspaper comics since 1931.
- Funny Pages (1939 series) #7 (30) - Centaur Publications
- More Fun Comics #47 – National Periodical Publications
- Movie Comics #6 – National Periodical Publications, Final Issue
- Mutt and Jeff (1939 series) #1 – National Periodical Publications
- Mystery Men Comics #2 – Fox Feature Syndicate
- Smash Comics #2 – Quality Comics
- Superman #2, cover dated Fall – National Periodical Publications
- Wonderworld Comics No. 5 - Fox Feature Syndicate

=== October ===
- October 15: Dorothy Urfer and Virginia Krausmann's Annibelle ends its run after a decade of publication.
- October: Russell Keaton's Flyin' Jenny makes its debut. It will run until 1946.
- Ace Comics #31 – David McKay Publications
- Action Comics #17 – National Allied Publications
- Adventure Comics #43 – National Allied Publications
- All-American Comics #7 – All-American Publications
- Amazing Man Comics #6 – Centaur Publications
- Amazing Mystery Funnies #14 – Centaur Publications
- Detective Comics #32 – National Allied Publications
- Feature Comics #25 – Quality Comics
- Four Color Series 1 #2 – Dell Publishing
- Funny Pages (1939 series) #8 (31) - Centaur Publications
- Marvel Comics (becomes Marvel Mystery Comics) (1939 series) #1 – Timely Comics
- More Fun Comics #48 – National Periodical Publications
- Mystery Men Comics #3 – Fox Feature Syndicate
- Smash Comics #3 – Quality Comics
- Star Ranger Funnies (1939 series) #5 - Centaur Publications
- Wonderworld Comics #6 - Fox Feature Syndicate

=== November ===
- Ace Comics #32 – David McKay Publications
- Action Comics #18 – National Allied Publications
- Adventure Comics #44 – National Allied Publications
- All-American Comics #8 – All-American Publications
- Amazing Man Comics #7 – Centaur Publications
- Amazing Mystery Funnies #15 – Centaur Publications
- Blue Beetle #1 – Fox Feature Syndicate
- Detective Comics #33 – National Allied Publications
- Double Action Comics #1 — National Allied Publications. Released only in New York City newsstands, Double Action Comics was most likely an "ashcan", a limited-run publication produced simply to register the title. It had a black-and-white cover, with the contents pulled from Action Comics No. 2.
- Feature Comics #26 – Quality Comics
- Funny Pages (1939 series) #9 (32) - Centaur Publications
- More Fun Comics #49 – National Periodical Publications
- Mystery Men Comics #4 – Fox Feature Syndicate
- Smash Comics #4 – Quality Comics
- Superman #3 – National Allied Publications – Winter Issue
- Wonderworld Comics #7 - Fox Feature Syndicate

=== December ===
- Will Eisner leaves the comics studio Eisner & Iger.
- Ace Comics #33 – David McKay Publications
- Action Comics #19 – National Allied Publications
- Adventure Comics #45 – National Allied Publications
- All-American Comics #9 – All-American Publications
- Amazing Man Comics #8 – Centaur Publications
- Amazing Mystery Funnies #16 – Centaur Publications
- Detective Comics #34 – National Allied Publications
- Double Action Comics (1939 series) #1 – National Periodical Publications (ashcan copy, distributed only in New York City newsstands)
- Fantastic Comics (1939 series) #1 - Fox Feature Syndicate
- Feature Comics #27 – Quality Comics – In this issue Will Eisner and Lou Fine's Doll Man makes his debut.
- Funny Pages (1939 series) #10 (33) - Centaur Publications
- Marvel Mystery Comics (previously Marvel Comics) #2 – Timely Comics
- More Fun Comics #50 – National Periodical Publications
- Mystery Men Comics #5 – Fox Feature Syndicate
- Smash Comics #5 – Quality Comics
- Wonderworld Comics #8 - Fox Feature Syndicate

=== Specials ===
- New York World's Fair (1939 series) #1 – National Periodical Publications
- Mutt & Jeff (1939 series) #1 – All-American Comics

=== Specific date unknown ===
- The first episode of Arthur Warden's Tuffy and his Magic Tail is published.
- Lev Gleason founds the comic book company Lev Gleason Publications.
- A boom year for the burgeoning American comic book industry, as Archie Comics, Fawcett Comics, Fox Feature Syndicate, Lev Gleason Publications, Marvel Comics/Timely Comics, Nedor Comics, and Quality Comics all begin publishing.
- The Serbian comic strip Zigomar by writer Branko Vidić and artist Nikola Navojev begins publication.

== Births ==
=== March ===
- March 27: Jo Teodorescu, Romanian illustrator and comics artist (Aventurile profesului Parbriz), (d. 2014).

=== April ===
- April 10: Shinji Mizushima, Japanese manga artist (Yakyū-kyō no Uta, Dokaben, Abu-san), (d. 2022).

== Deaths ==
=== January ===
- January 18: Carl E. Schultze, American comics artist (Foxy Grandpa), dies at age 72.
- January 20: Victor Bergdahl, Swedish animator and comics artist (Kapten Grogg), dies at age 60.

=== June ===
- June 28: Joz De Swerts, Belgian illustrator, political cartoonist and comics artist (worked for Zonneland), dies at age 49.

=== July ===
- July 4: Louis Wain, British painter and illustrator (illustrations starring anthropomorphic cats), dies at age 78.
- July 25: A.E. Hayward, American comics artist (Somebody's Stenog), dies at age 55.

=== August ===
- August 14: T.E. Powers, American comics artist (Our Moving Pictures, Mr. Nobody Holme), dies at the age of 69.

=== September ===
- September 8: Elie Smalhout, Dutch graphic artist, illustrator and comics artist (made text comics for De Notenkraker), dies at age 49.
- September 23: Frits Van den Berghe, Belgian painter, illustrator and comic artist (Jan Van Plan, Pikkel en Duim, Edmund Bell), dies at age 56.
- September 29: Luc Lafnet, aka Davine, Visnet, O. Lucas, Pol, Luc, Belgian-French comics artist (Bizouk et Pélik, Zizette, assisted on Spirou et Fantasio, Bibor et Tribar), dies at age 40 from pancreatic cancer.

=== October ===
- October 10: Benjamin Rabier, French comics artist, illustrator, animator and advertising artist (Gédéon, Tintin-Lutin, designed La Vache Qui Rit), dies at age 74.
- October 12: Llorenç Brunet i Forroll, Spanish caricaturist, painter and comics artist, dies at age 67.
- October 18: Carl Olof Petersen, Swedish illustrator, painter and comics artist, dies at age 59.
- October 29: Zane Grey, American novelist and comic writer (scripted King of the Royal Mounted), dies at age 67.

=== November ===
- November 22: Walter Hoban, American comics artist (Jerry on the Job), dies at age 49.

=== December ===
- December 18: Bruno Liljefors, Swedish painter and comics artist, dies at age 79.

=== Specific date unknown ===
- Paul Augros, French illustrator and comics artist, dies at age 58.
- Louis de Lajarrige, French illustrator, painter, comics artist and writer, dies at age 66.
- E. Nicolson, French illustrator and comics artist (Les Aventures du Chien Brownie, Bambochard et Trémolo), dies at an unknown age.

== First issues by title ==
- All-American Comics (April, All-American Publications)
- Amazing Man Comics (September, Centaur Publications) Issues No. 1 through 4 were not published.
- Double Action Comics (December, National Periodical Publications) The first issue was an ashcan copy, published but not distributed or sold.
- Fantastic Comics (December, Fox Feature Syndicate)
- Four Color (Dell Publishing)
- Marvel Comics (October, Timely Comics)
- Movie Comics (April, National Periodical Publications)
- Mutt & Jeff (Summer, All-American Comics)
- Mystery Men Comics (August, Fox Feature Syndicate)
- New York World's Fair (National Periodical Publications)
- Silver Streak Comics (December, Rhoda Publications)
- Smash Comics (August, Quality Comics)
- Star Comics Volume 2 (February, Centaur Publications)
- Star Ranger Funnies Volume 2 (January, Centaur Publications)
- Superman (Summer, National Periodical Publications)
- The Magic Comic (July, D. C. Thomson & Co.)
- Wonder Comics (May, Fox Feature Syndicate)

=== Renamed titles ===
- Feature Comics renamed Feature Funnies as of the June cover date.
- Marvel Comics renamed Marvel Mystery Comics as of the December cover date.
- Wonder Comics renamed Wonderworld Comics starting with issue #3 with a cover date of July.

== Initial appearances by character name ==
- Batman (Earth-Two) in Detective Comics No. 27 (May), created by Bill Finger and Bob Kane, published by National Allied Publications
- Bozo the Iron Man in Smash Comics No. 1 (August), created by George Brenner, published by Quality Comics.
- Commissioner Gordon in Detective Comics No. 27 (May) created by Bill Finger and Bob Kane, published by National Allied Publications
- Dan Garret (Blue Beetle) in Mystery Men Comics No. 1 (August), created by Charles Nicholas, published by Fox Feature Syndicate.
- Doctor Death (character) in Detective Comics No. 29 (July), created by Bob Kane, published by National Periodical Publications
- Doll Girl in Feature Comics No. 27 (December), created by Will Eisner, Published by Quality Comics.
- Doll Man in Feature Comics No. 27 (December), created by Will Eisner, Published by Quality Comics.
- Green Mask (Michael Shelby) in Mystery Men Comics No. 1 (August), created by Walter Frame, Published by Fox Feature Syndicate.
- Human Torch in Marvel Comics No. 1 (October) created by Carl Burgos, published by Timely Comics
- Invisible Hood in Smash Comics No. 1 (August), created by Art Pinajian, published by Quality Comics.
- Joe Chill in Detective Comics No. 33 (November), created by Bill Finger and Bob Kane.
- Monk (comics) in Detective Comics No. 31 (September), created by Gardner Fox and Bob Kane, published by National Periodical Publications
- Namor The Sub-Mariner in Marvel Comics #1 (October) created by Bill Everett, published by Timely Comics
- Samson in Fantastic Comics #1 (December) created by Will Eisner and Alex Blum
- Sandman (Wesley Dodds) in New York World's Fair Comics No. 1, created by Gardner Fox and Bert Christman, published by National Periodical Publications.
- The Flame (Gary Preston) in Wonderworld Comics No. 3 created by Will Eisner and Lou Fine, published by Fox Feature Syndicate.
- Ultra-Humanite in Action Comics No. 13 (June), created by Jerry Siegel and Joe Shuster, published by National Periodical Publications.
- Ultra-Man in All-American Comics No. 8 (November), created by Jon L. Blummer, published by National Periodical Publications
