= Dynamo (Fox Feature Syndicate) =

Fox Feature Syndicate superhero

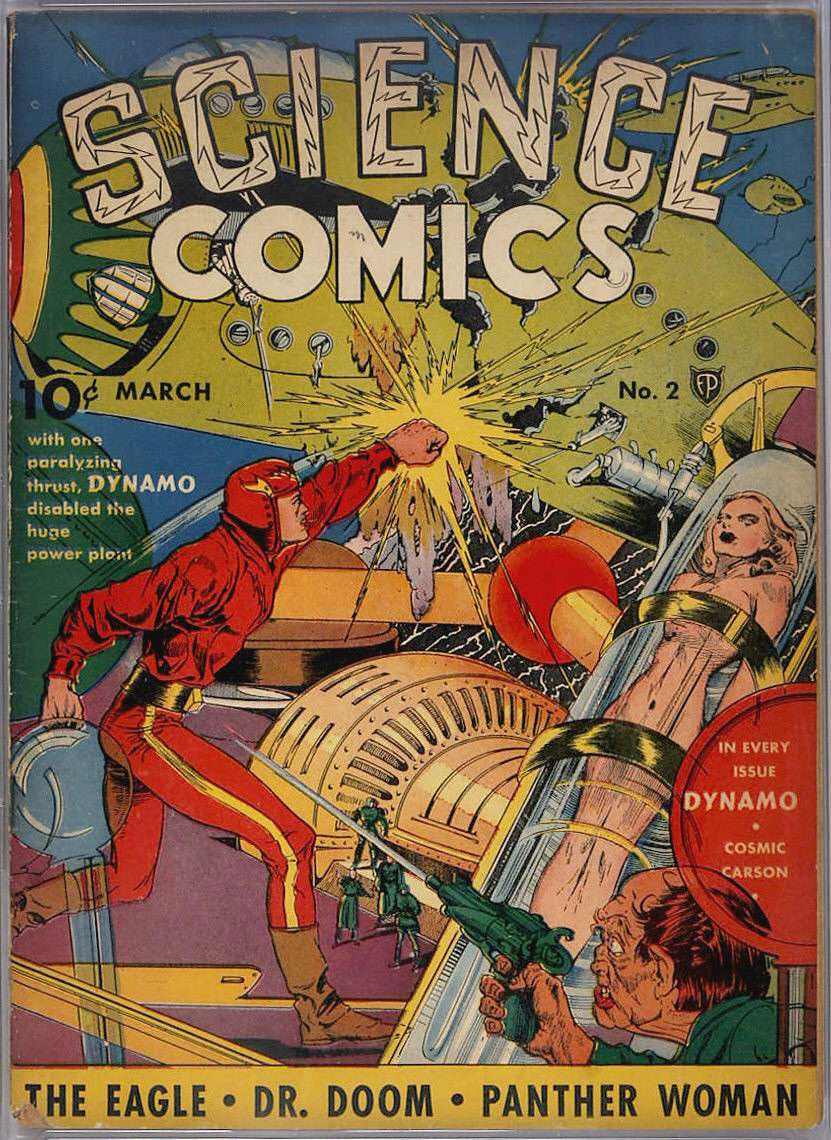
- Dynamo on the cover of Science Comics #2, art by Lou Fine.

Publication information
- Publisher: Fox Feature Syndicate
- First appearance: (As Electro): Science Comics #1 (February 1940) (As Dynamo): Science Comics #2 (March 1940)
- Created by: Robert Webb

In-story information
- Alter ego: Jim Andrews
- Notable aliases: Electro
- Abilities: Flight; Force field generation Ability to generate, project, channel and absorb electricity

Dynamo is a superhero who appeared in comic books published by Fox Feature Syndicate during the Golden Age of comics. The character first appeared under the name Electro in Science Comics #1 (February 1940). He was renamed and debuted as Dynamo in Science Comics #2 (March 1940). The name change was likely made to avoid a conflict with an earlier character named Electro who appeared in publications by Timely Comics.

== Fictional character biography ==
Jim Andrews is a young research scientist who is caught between two giant electrodes while conducting an experiment. He finds that the accident has given him the power to control electricity, which he can use to create force fields, shoot bolts of electricity from his hands, or fly through the air. If he uses his powers for too long, he can recharge by holding onto an electrical source. Deciding to call himself Electro, Jim puts on a helmet and cape to fight crime. He later changes his name to Dynamo, which he uses for the rest of his career.

According to Jess Nevins' Encyclopedia of Golden Age Superheroes, Dynamo "fights the Genius, Stark's Super Science Spies, saboteurs, the Invention Destroyers, and the Crime Dealers".

Dynamo was a regular feature in Fox's Science Comics and Weird Comics, occasionally as the lead feature. His last appearance was in Weird Comics #19 (November 1941).

== Powers and abilities ==
Dynamo/Electro has the ability to control electricity. He can send electricity out from his hands, create bullet-repelling force fields, and fly. His source of electricity can be depleted by overuse, but he is able to recharge by holding onto a new source of electricity.
