= Thor in comics =

Thor, the god of Norse mythology, has appeared as a character in various comics over the years, appearing in series from a range of publishers.

== Marvel Comics ==
Thor Odinson (often called The Mighty Thor) is a Marvel Comics superhero, based on the thunder god of Norse mythology. The superhero was created by editor Stan Lee and penciller Jack Kirby, who co-plotted, and scripter Larry Lieber, and first appeared in Journey into Mystery #83 (Aug. 1962).

On a mission from his father, Odin, Thor acts as a superhero while maintaining the secret identity of Dr. Donald Blake, an American physician with a partially disabled leg. Blake can transform by tapping his walking stick on the ground; the cane becomes the magical hammer Mjolnir and Blake transforms into Thor.

Thor, a founding member of the superhero group the Avengers, often battles his evil adoptive brother Loki, a Marvel character adapted from the Norse god of mischief. He is among Marvel's most powerful superheroes. Many recurring characters in his stories are based on Norse Mythology. As with other superheroes, the Thor identity has been taken by other characters, including Jane Foster, who became a female Thor.

Apart from this main superhero, Marvel features a number of characters based on him.

Chris Hemsworth portrays the character in the Marvel Cinematic Universe, first appearing in the 2011 film Thor. Hemsworth reprised his role for The Avengers, Thor: The Dark World, Avengers: Age of Ultron, Doctor Strange, Thor: Ragnarok, Avengers: Infinity War, Avengers: Endgame, Thor: Love and Thunder, and Avengers: Doomsday.

== DC Comics ==
Thor, as depicted by Jack Kirby in Tales of the Unexpected #16 (1957).

Jack Kirby made a story featuring Thor in Tales of the Unexpected #16. A cowboy finds Thor's hammer in the American desert and uses it for his own gain, until it is reclaimed by Thor. This version of Thor is not similar to the Marvel Comics character that Kirby would create five years later, although there are some minor similarities, such as the design of Mjolnir and the circles in Thor's chest. Kirby would often cite this adventure to claim that he was the main creator of the Marvel Comics character.

Thor appears in the first issues of Jack Kirby's Fourth World by John Byrne. His appearance is explicitly based on Kirby's design of the Marvel character, but is more faithful to the original mythology having red hair, a beard and a more brutish personality. He and the other Asgard gods are stated to be related to, but not synonymous with, the Old Gods (the progenitors of the New Gods). Later Thor clarifies that they are "echoes" of the Old Gods and resemble them down to their names, thus explaining how the Norse gods can still exist in the DC Universe when the event that killed the Old Gods is implied to have been Ragnarök.

Thor also appears briefly in Neil Gaiman's Sandman series in the story "Seasons of Mists". In that story, he, Odin and Loki try (and fail) to get the key of Hell. Thor is portrayed as a lewd drunk. This is in contrast to the Marvel Comics portrayal of Thor, where Thor is portrayed as very noble and earnest. In the later Sandman story, "Kindly Ones", he helps Odin capture Loki.

In another story, Wonder Woman and Superman travel to Valhalla and help Thor in a war for a thousand years.

== America's Best Comics (ABC) ==
The deity Thor (called Þunor or Thunor as in Thor's Old English name) appears in the America's Best Comics police procedural series Top 10 by artist Gene Ha and writer Alan Moore, where officers interview the deity and other gods as witnesses to the death of Baldur at the hands of Hod. The god appears here as a belligerent, red-bearded, balding man, prone to swearing, whose lack of cooperation leads to a swift takedown by Smax.

== Comico Comics ==
Thor is also a fictional character in the Comico comic book series Elementals. He was created by Bill Willingham and first appeared in Elementals #23 (Volume 1).

== Willy Vandersteen group (Flemish) ==
The Flemish comic artist Willy Vandersteen started three series in which a Thor was featured. His very first published newspaper comic series (when World War II stopped US-import in 1941) was "Tor de Holbewoner", about a caveman called Tor. Taking into account that "Tor" is a Dutch word for beetle, in Dutch the difference between T and Th is hardly (if at all) heard and that it was about a caveman living way before the invention of orthography, it is no miracle that this caveman returned (still during the war) with his name changed to "Thor".

In "De Rode Ridder" series the existence of the thunder god Thor is shown in #45, (The Hammer of Thor, 1970) and the Thunderer has a role in #63 (The Valkyrie, 1974), in which the Rode/Red Knight has been chosen by Odin to complete a mission the gods cannot do themselves without causing Ragnarok. Both albums are by Karel Biddeloo. Unlike the Marvel Thor, Biddeloo's Thor is more or less a country boy, with enormous powers but bound by responsibility (avoidance of Ragnarok). The hammer of Thor was a weapon mortals could and did carry and use, but it was too powerful to control.

In the most popular series started by Vandersteen, Suske en Wiske (Spike and Suzy), Thor is featured once in #158 in a story by Paul Geerts. Thor in this version is a cruel, grey-bearded god, going a bit bald on top, thundering and lightninging with his hammer, without throwing it. (Odin in this story is the young-looking, bearded redhead). Like Biddeloo's Thor, this one is also dressed in animal skins, and that may be seen as a reference to the caveman.

== Madsen’s Valhalla Thor (Danish) ==
This is Thor in the European "comedic adventure" tradition of Asterix, Lucky Luke etc. with the difference that where those series are using history as source material, Peter Madsen uses mythology for his series Valhalla (1978), with the same freedom to make jokes about current reality or other works of fiction, mostly following the Eddas.

Thor is one of the main heroes of the series and can be seen as a central character.

Thor is here rather correctly put, as the honest, red bearded muscular, powerful god, with a bit of extra human weaknesses to keep the comic funny. Statements that he would be fat are false, but may be based on his disguise in #3 as Volstagg, thus parodying Marvel's Asgardians.

Thrud and Modi are his firstborn children (in #2), their mother is Sif (pregnant from the start of the series). Magni has Jarnsaxa as mother and shows up in #9.

== Other uses of Thor in comics ==
=== Other uses of the Norse myth in comics ===
Other uses of the Thor of Norse mythology include:

- Thor is a semi-regular character in the Karl Vincent: Vampire Hunter series from KRG comics
- Thor and Dynamite Thor: The Golden Age anthology Weird Comics by the Fox Feature Syndicate featured two characters named Thor. The first, seen in issues #1-5, is a mortal man given strange lightning powers by the Norse God. Grant Ferrell was chosen by the real Thor, looking down at humanity from his perch in Valhalla. Thor decided to bestow powers on a mortal, and spied Grant, a meek man who lost his girlfriend Glenda at a nightclub. Thor picked Grant up and brought him to Valhalla, where he was trained in using the powers of lightning and Mjolnir, Thor's magic hammer. Grant returns to Earth dressed in a revealing costume — just trunks, a cape and a helmet. He rescues Glenda from a group of spies, and decides to devote his life to heroic deeds. He goes on to fight spies and Germans. That character lasted for five issues, and was then rebooted in issue #6 as a new character, Peter "Dynamite" Thor, with different powers, but the same girlfriend. Dynamite Thor was a demolitions expert who was immune to the effect of explosives. He used dynamite to propel himself through the air. He used his abilities to fight spies, mad scientists and the devious War Maniac. Dynamite Thor appeared in Weird Comics #6 and 7, and then moved to Blue Beetle #6-8.
- Thor, along with the other Norse gods, appears in David Brin's comic, The Life Eaters.
- Thôrr-Sverd: The Sword of Thor #1-3, published ca. 1987 by Vincent Creations, began the telling of the story of the impact of the gods on the Proto-Indo-European people. It suggested that perhaps, contrary to canonical mythology, the giants were the good guys and the gods were the villains.
- Erik Larsen's Savage Dragon has its own version of Thor, a red-headed villainous thunder god.
- A villainous Thor appeared in Rob Liefeld's comic book Youngblood.
- El Cazador de Aventuras from Argentina included in its 32-34 issues a remake of the Ragnarok, with Cazador in the middle of it.
- In Fate/Kaleid Liner Prisma Illya, the antagonist Beatrice Flowerchild uses the Berserker Class Card to gain Thor's powers and his hammer, Mjolnir.
- Thor and other Asgards appears in various Disney comic stories most nobly in Carl Barks's Uncle Scrooge story Mythtic Mystery first published by Dell Comics in Uncle Scrooge"#34, june, 1961

=== Other characters by the name of Thor in comics ===
Other characters by the name of Thor include:

- Johnny Hart's comic strip BC also features a caveman named Thor.
- The Quality Comics version of Manhunter had a dog named Thor that assisted him.
