= Stardust the Super Wizard =

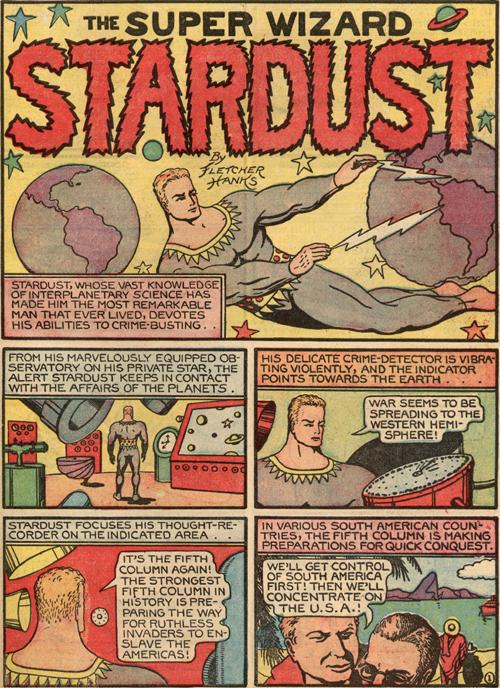
- Stardust feature in Fantastic Comics #14 (April 1941). Art and story by Fletcher Hanks.

Publication information
- Publisher: Fox Feature Syndicate
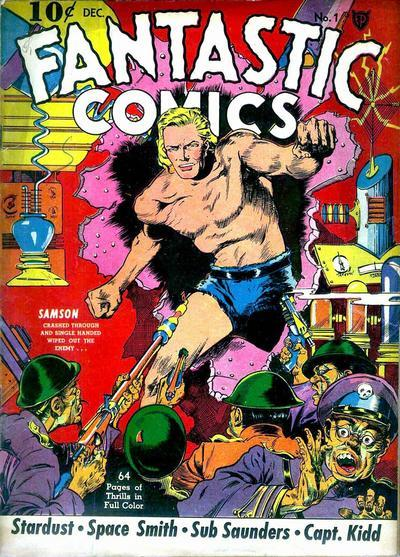
- First appearance: Fantastic Comics #1 (December 1939) Fox Feature Syndicate
- Created by: Fletcher Hanks

In-story information
- Alter ego: None
- Species: Unknown
- Place of origin: Unrevealed
- Partnerships: Federal Bureau of Investigation (FBI); Interplanetary Police; Interplanetary Guardian of the Peace (unnamed); Local law enforcement; The Stardust Sixth Column
- Abilities: Superhuman strength, speed, durability and endurance; Vast knowledge of interplanetary science; Master of space and planetary forces; Skilled detective; Formidable brawler; Accelerate perception; Extrasensory perception; Augmented respiration; Interplanetary flight; Indestructibility; Telepathy; Teleportation; Metamorphosis; Transmogrification; Telekinesis; Selective omniscience; Luminous skywriting; Other powers as required by the story

Stardust the Super Wizard is a fictional superhero from the Golden Age of Comics who originally appeared in American comic books published by Fox Feature Syndicate. The character was created by writer-artist Fletcher Hanks, and made his first appearance in Fantastic Comics #1 (December 1939).

== Publication history ==
=== Golden Age stories ===
Stardust the Super Wizard was featured in 16 issues of Fantastic Comics (December 1939–March 1941) and Big 3 #2 (January 1941). All features, with exceptions of Fantastic Comics #6 and #9, were both written and illustrated by Fletcher Hanks.

According to Jess Nevins' Encyclopedia of Golden Age Superheroes, Stardust's foes include "ordinary criminals, the Brain-Men of Mars, the Super Fiend, Skullface Kurd, and Yew Bee and his Fifth Column".

=== Reprints and collections ===
Stardust stories were reprinted in:

- Raw #5 (March 1983)
- Crack #2 (April 1984)
- Men of Mystery Comics (2001, 2005, 2007, 2015)
- Golden Age Greats Spotlight, vol. 3 (May 2008)
- Stardust the Super Wizard comics/RPG (September 2016)

Gwandanaland Comics issued the complete collection of Stardust stories from the Golden Age of Comics in Gwandanaland Comics #9: Stardust the Super Wizard (September 2016).

The complete works of Fletcher Hanks have been collected in the Fantagraphics Books:

- I Shall Destroy All Civilized Planets! (2007)
- You Shall Die by Your Own Evil Creation! (2009)
- Turn Loose Our Death Rays and Kill Them All! (2016)

The last volume is a combination of the first two with additional material. The complete collection catalogs all 15 of Fletcher Hanks' classic Stardust stories. In 2008, editor Paul Karasik received an Eisner Award for "Best Archival Collection/Project: Comic Books" for his work on I Shall Destroy All Civilized Planets! In 2009, Fantagraphics started to include a Fletcher Hanks mini-comic coloring book titled Color Me or Die!, featuring a cover by Charles Burns, to people who ordered volumes of The Complete Fletcher Hanks.

=== Index ===
Date	Publication	Publisher
1939.12	Fantastic Comics #1	Fox Feature Syndicate
1940.01	Fantastic Comics #2	Fox Feature Syndicate
1940.02	Fantastic Comics #3	Fox Feature Syndicate
1940.03	Fantastic Comics #4	Fox Feature Syndicate
1940.04	Fantastic Comics #5	Fox Feature Syndicate
1940.05	Fantastic Comics #6	Fox Feature Syndicate
1940.06	Fantastic Comics #7	Fox Feature Syndicate
1940.07	Fantastic Comics #8	Fox Feature Syndicate
1940.08	Fantastic Comics #9	Fox Feature Syndicate
1940.09	Fantastic Comics #10	Fox Feature Syndicate
1940.10	Fantastic Comics #11	Fox Feature Syndicate
1940.11	Fantastic Comics #12	Fox Feature Syndicate
1940.12	Fantastic Comics #13	Fox Feature Syndicate
1941	Big 3 #2	Fox Feature Syndicate
1941.01	Fantastic Comics #14	Fox Feature Syndicate
1941.02	Fantastic Comics #15	Fox Feature Syndicate
1941.03	Fantastic Comics #16	Fox Feature Syndicate
1983.03	Raw #5	Raw Books & Graphics
1984.04	Crack #2	Stödföreningen ETC
2001	Men of Mystery Comics #34	AC Comics
2005	Men of Mystery Comics #55	AC Comics
2007	Men of Mystery: Golden Age Grand Slam #1	AC Comics
2007.06	The Complete Works of Fletcher Hanks, Vol. 1: I Shall Destroy All Civilized Planets!	Fantagraphics Books
2008.05	Golden Age Greats Spotlight, Vol. #3 - Fox Features: The First Heroic Wave	AC Comics
2009	Color Me Or Die!	Fantagraphics Books
2009.09	The Complete Works of Fletcher Hanks, Vol. 2: You Shall Die by Your Own Evil Creation!	Fantagraphics Books
2015	Men of Mystery Comics #98	AC Comics
2016.09	Gwandanaland Comics #9: Stardust the Super Wizard	CreateSpace
2016.09	Stardust the Super Wizard	NUELOW Games
2016.12	Turn Loose Our Death Rays And Kill Them All!: The Complete Works of Fletcher Hanks	Fantagraphics Books

== Fictional character biography ==
Stardust, whose vast knowledge of interplanetary science has made him the most remarkable man that ever lived, devotes his abilities to crime-busting. In later episodes, he changes his focus to racket-busting. In his Golden Age adventures, Stardust patrolled the entire occupied Solar System. The stories, however, focused primarily on his dealings with the planet Earth. Nothing is known of Stardust's past.

Stardust stories followed a tried-and-true formula. The Super Wizard would use his omniscient powers to eavesdrop on criminals plotting a crime. The main villain would describe his grandiose plan (e.g. to commit genocide, lay waste to a city, destroy democracy, etc.). Stardust would pontificate on how evil the villain's plans were but did nothing to prevent them. The villain would then put his plan into action, and many people were either killed or forced to flee. When Stardust arrived on the scene, he would verbally berate the villains and then set into motion a series of increasingly bizarre and violent acts of revenge against the evildoers, often turning their own schemes against them. When the dust cleared, the citizenry would often bemoan the fact that they were unable to thank their hero who had already flown back to his secret headquarters in the stars.

== Further adventures ==
Stardust the Super Wizard is in the public domain, and has appeared in stories published by various creators over the decades, including those who have rendered individual interpretations of the original character, which in some cases provide backstories, explain in plot holes in the original stories, or otherwise develop the character.

Publishers of tabletop role-playing games have created campaigns featuring Stardust the Super Wizard, allowing players to interact, collaborate, and write their own stories.

List of unofficial Stardust the Super Wizard stories
Date	Publication/outlet	Story title	Summary	Publisher
2002.11	Five Earths Project	"The Paragons: Deus Ex Astra"	Stardust the Super Wizard returned to Earth after the events of the Crisis on Infinite Earths to help usher in a new heroic age in a story written by Doc Quantum, C Syphrett, Libby Lawrence, and Bradley Cobb.	Five Earths Project
2006.10	Faster Than the World	"Fiction Universe Presents Stardust the Super Wizard"	Stardust the Super Wizard fought assorted Halloween monsters and saves the girl (but forgets the guy) in a one-page webcomic by Kory Schaubhut.	Faster Than the World
2006.11	FemForce #137	"Starcrossed"	Femforce member Stardust (no relation) met Stardust the Super Wizard in a story by Chris Irving.	AC Comics
2007.06	ThatsMySkull.blogspot.com	"Jonah Hex the SUPER WIZARD!"	Jonah Hex stepped into the role of Stardust the Super Wizard in a parody by Sleestak.	Lady, That's My Skull
2007.08	FemForce #140	"Nothing to Fear But Fear Itself"	Femforce battled the supreme villainy of the twisted demi-god Stardust the Super Wizard in a story by Chris Irving.	AC Comics
2008.02	Fantastic Comics #24	"Stardust the Super Wizard"	Stardust the Super Wizard returned to Earth to team up with a number of Golden Age superheroes and save humanity from itself in a new story written by Joe Keatinge and illustrated by Mike Allred as part of Image Comics' Next Issue Project. The story was narrated by the adult version of the nameless girl Stardust saved in Fantastic Comics #12 (November 1940).	Image Comics
2008.02	Duck Web Comics	"Stardust the Super Wizard"	Stardust the Super Wizard, now in retirement, longed for the good old days when people needed heroes in the webcomic written by Jason Derr and illustrated by Simon S. Andrews.	Dreamland Pictures
2008.03	Fletcher Hank Redux	Multiple stories	In 2008, students of Savannah College of Art and Design launched an online anthology that paid tribute to the works of Stardust's creator. The collection featured original stories by Jason Axtell, Stanton Broadway, Anna Ferrara, and Andrew Greenstone. The collection was edited by Jeremy W. "Sweetwater" Mullins and Christopher Berinato. The website is no longer active.: Stardust the Super Wizard vs the Great Galactic Octopus, by Jason Axtell, featured a makeup-wearing Stardust the Super Wizard battling the Great Galactic Octopus and the Fantastic Club of Corruption in a story. The nameless girl from Fantastic Comics #12 (November 1940) played a supporting role.; In Fantomah's Blind Date by Anna Ferrara, Stardust the Super Wizard played the supportive friend to Fantomah in a romcom short story.; In Andrew Greenstone's Stardust Destroys the Earth, Stardust the Super Wizard was ordered to destroy the unsavable planet Earth by his mysterious master in an apocalyptic story.	Sequential Laboratory
2008.11	Savage Dragon #141	"The Victims"	Stardust the Super Wizard battled Solar Man alongside the Savage Dragon and a host of Golden Age Heroes in a story by Erik Larsen.	Image Comics
2008.12	EarthmanPrime.DeviantArt	"Fun in One"	Siegfried Stardust, the Super Wizard, made an appearance as either an arbiter of reality or a drug-induced hallucination in astory by Larry King.	EarthmanPrime
2009.05	The League of Extraordinary Gentlemen: Century #1	"Minions of the Moon, Chapter One: Into The Limbus",	The headquarters for British superhero Captain Universe was a space station, originally owned by the cruel vigilante known as the "Space Wizard" in Alan Moore and Kevin O'Neill's League of Extraordinary Gentlemen. The frozen body of Stardust the Space Wizard is seen on display.	Top Shelf Productions
2011.04	Stegosaurus Studios	"Stardust the Super-Wizard"	Stardust the Super Wizard battles the Robot Monsters of the mysterious Dr. Babylon in a story by Joshua LH Burnett, the artist for the Leopard Women of Mars role-playing game.	Stegosaurus Studios
2011.07	Kaza's Mate, Gwenna	"Ruthless Ro-Man"	An alien invasion of the Earth was said to have been thwarted by the Space Patrol with the assistance of Stardust the Super Wizard in a story by Jay Epps.	Jay042
2011.10	The Kingsington Journal	"Kaos Strikes The Planet Earth!!"	Stardust the Super Wizard battled the intergalactic villain Kaos in a story by Thom Kane.	Thom Kane Publishers
2012.08	Yamino.DeviantArt	"Cadettes: Fantomah! Mystery Woman of the Jungle"	Cadette Jackie played Stardust the Super Wizard to Phoebe's Fantomah in a game of Pretend in a story by Elena Barbarich.	Elena Barbarich
2014.03	RyanValentineComics.DeviantArt	"Allegro Moderato"	Cosmic Carla, Mistress Mage of Magic Macabre, mentioned that she once had a brief fling with Stardust the Super Wizard (after he had broken up with Fantomah) in a story by Ryan Valentine.	Ryan Valentine Comics
2015.01	Amazing Heroes action figures	"Contest of Champions"	Stardust was seen in the company of his fellow Golden Age heroes in the collect-them-all serialized story by Christopher Irving, portions of which were featured on the back of each Amazing Heroes Action Figures - Artist Edition package.	Fresh Monkey Fiction
2015.04	Something Strange Is Going On!	"The Horror of Voidstone"	Stardust the Super Wizard battled a more powerful version of himself, created by the mysterious new leader of the evil Fifth Column in a story by Frank Schildiner.	Flinch! Books
2015.04	Stardust the Super Wizard soft vinyl collectible	"Stardust the Super Wizard"	Stardust the Super Wizard battled the Secret Mob Boss Council and its plans to buy the US Stock Exchange in a story by Benjamin Marra. The exclusive four-page Stardust mini-comic came packaged with the Stardust action figure that was produced by Eagle Eye Prime.	Eagle Eye Prime
2015.10	Super Wizard Universe	"Big Red Saves Christmas"	Stardust the Super Wizard and Fantomah are introduced as Big Red McLane's co-workers in the holiday story by Joey Peters.	Super Wizard Universe
2015.10	Super Wizard Universe	"The Super Wizard Returns"	Stardust the Super Wizard and Rosemary, the no-longer nameless girl from Fantastic Comics #12, returned after a 75-year absence to find the Earth changed by the technology Stardust left behind in a story by Joey Peters. Supporting characters have included Fantomah, Yew Bee, the remains of the Stardust Sixth Column, and the descendants of Big Red McClane.	Super Wizard Universe
2015.11	Super Wizard Universe	"Attack of the Super Wizards"	Stardust the Super Wizard brought together other Fletcher Hanks characters and alternate versions of himself from parallel worlds to defend the Earth against the Council of Super-Wizards in the continuing webcomic by Joey Peters. The story featured a host of stories within the story and several alternate origins of Stardust the Super Wizard.	Super Wizard Universe
2016.01	Ape-Men Apocalypse	"Ape-Men of the Apocalypse"	An unnamed, bro-speaking "Super Wizard" was a known associate of the Omni-Po-Toad in a story by Brad Dwyer.	Ape-Men Apocalypse
2016.01	Jersey City Comics	"Kitchen Scissors"	Stardust the Super Wizard ran for political office and pledged to be "reeaal tough on immigration" in a story by the Barcade Jersey City Draw Jam.	Jersey City Comics
2016.02	Amazing Forest #2	"Stardust"	Stardust the Super Wizard used his god-like powers to create a perfect world...over and over again in a story by Erick Freitas and Ulises Farinas.	Monkeybrain Comics
2016.03	Jersey City Comics	"Look! Waffles!"	Stardust the Super Wizard returned to political office and pledged to "make America weird again" in a story by the Barcade Jersey City Draw Jam.	Jersey City Comics
2016.04	Square Root of Minus Garfield	"No. 2519: Garfdust"	Garfield the Cat played the part of De Structo when he met Stardust the Super Wizard in a parody of Big 3 Comics #2 (January 1941) by priority_kitten.	Square Root of Minus Garfield
2016.08	Amazing Forest TPB	"Stardust"	Stardust the Super Wizard used his god-like powers to create a perfect world...over and over again in a story by Erick Freitas and Ulises Farinas.	Monkeybrain Comics
2016.12	The Rabbit Hero	"Stardust the Super Wizard"	Stardust the Super Wizard made an appearance in Tony Brandl's visual poem.	The Rabbit Hero
2017.02	Super Wizard Universe	"Stardust vs. Donald Trump"	Stardust, the "mad god with no conception of human ethics or morality" returned to Earth in the Joey Peters lampoon of the 2016 presidential election.	Super Wizard Universe
2018.05	Tapas	"The Power of Stardust"	Stardust the Super Wizard is featured in Otto Gruenwald's ongoing web comic.	Tapas

List of role-playing games featuring Stardust the Super Wizard
Date	Title	Role	Description	Publisher
2011.03	"Leopard Women of Venus"	Non-player character	Stardust the Super Wizard is a non-player character featured in the Leopard Women of Venus, a role-playing game based on the works of Fletcher Hanks and produced by Hex Games	Hex Games
2012.08	"Golden Age Supers: The Return of Stardust"	Non-player character	Joshua Burnett created a QAGS game featuring Golden Age superheroes who come out of retirement to prevent the return of a vengeful Stardust the Super Wizard in The Return of Stardust.	DM Studios
2016.04	"The Super Villain Handbook Deluxe Edition"	Power Corrupted Archetype	Stardust the Super Wizard represents the power corrupted archetype in The Super Villain Handbook Deluxe Edition from Fainting Goat Games.	Fainting Goat Games
2016.09	"The Power of Stardust"	Player character	The Power of Stardust is an extensive OGL d20 System supplement from NUELOW Games which offers a detailed, alternative interpretation of the techno-magical devices featured in the original Stardust stories.	NUELOW Games

== Powers and abilities ==
=== Skills ===
Stardust possesses knowledge of interplanetary science and has skills in data collection. Although he has not exhibited any formal combat training, his physical size and strength contribute to his abilities in physical combat .

=== Physicality ===
Physically, Stardust appears as a clean-cut, blond-haired, blue-eyed, white human male of heroic proportions. His height has been estimated anywhere between 7"2 and 9'9" tall. His genealogy has never been revealed. Although he has vested interests in Earth, it is unclear if he is of Earthly origin.

Stardust has exhibited a number of powers that are not attributed to his mastery of space and planetary forces. These powers may be attributed to an alien physiognomy, cybernetic augmentation, genetic modification, tetralogical manipulation, or a combination of these factors. The unexplained powers of Stardust include:

- Superhuman strength. He has lifted grown men off the ground one-handed and tossed them out a window with little effort.
- Superhuman speed and accelerated perception. Stardust once delivered a well-timed uppercut while traveling at 300,000 miles per minute (18 million miles an hour).
- Superhuman endurance. Stardust has never been known to tire—or sleep for that matter.
- Superhuman durability. Stardust is immune to extreme heat and cold due to exposure to gas emitted from a star.
- Extrasensory perception. Stardust has been able to sense danger and perceive events over great distances.
- Artificial lungs. Stardust's respiratory system has been augmented, enabling him to breathe safely under any condition, as he has been depicting hovering in the stratosphere dozens of miles above the Earth's surface without suffering any ill effects.

=== Star-metal Suit ===
Stardust wears a flexible sky-blue unitard made of star-metal that fits him like a second skin. It is controlled through rays from a distant sun, rendering him invulnerable to chemicals and indestructible by electrical or violent force. Stardust has worn mid-calf boots in both blue and red.

=== Radiation belt ===
Stardust wears a corset-sized gold radiation belt (aka ray belt) around his midsection. The belt is in a starburst motif and features two rows of red studs. The radiation belt empowers Stardust with a wide array of beams, rays, and arcs. Each ray is represented by its own red stud. Energies from the belt can be used at a local level to affect individual persons or expanded to levels that affect the movement of planetary bodies. The radiation belt does not need to be charged and is not dependent on an outside energy source. It has never overloaded or shown even minor stress despite the great demands that have been made of it. Stardust appears to be limited merely by the breadth of his scientific knowledge and his ability to make good choices.

Name	Effect
Absorbing ray	Makes objects disappear entirely.
Agitator ray	Stirs up large bodies of water, causing tidal waves and great surges.
Anti-gravity ray	Adjusts the planetary pull on an object.
Anti-motion ray	Removes all momentum from objects.
Attractor beam	Connects Stardust with an object and allow him to direct its physical motion.
Attractor ray	Identified a specific object or substance and pulls it toward Stardust.
Boomerang ray	Redirects and returns destructive forces back to their points of origin.
Cleaving ray	Splits objects in half.
Concentrator ray	Combines many people into one being.
Counteracting ray	Neutralizes or reverses a harmful effect.
Disintegrating ray	Causes objects to violently break up into small parts.
Enervating ray	Drains people of strength and energy, rendering them helpless.
Extinguishing ray	Puts out fires on a global scale.
Fusing ray	Melts materials or objects with intense heat.
Invisibility ray	Renders objects—even entire planets—invisible.
Magnetic ray	Physically pulls objects to Stardust.
Metal-repelling ray	Forces metal away.
Propelling beam	Imparts momentum to large groups of objects.
Radiophonic thought-recording ray	Transmits thoughts and suggestions over great distances.
Rarifying beam	Calms violent wind.
Reducing ray	Shrinks people or objects.
Repelling ray	Physically pushes objects and people away.
Retarding ray	Reduces the momentum of planet-size objects.
Reverse arc	Changes the direction of a tumbling force, such as a tidal wave.
Revolving speed ray	Rotates objects at great velocity.
Secret ray	Summons the skeletons of innocent murder victims.
Shadow transfer ray	Causes one object to mirror the appearance of another.
Spectral ray	Makes Stardust invisible or as bright as the sun.
Sun beam	Destroys the energy of pyroclastic rocks.
Superiority beam	Endows Stardust with a commanding presence, stunning people into inaction.
Suspending ray	Hangs and maintains objects in midair.
Suspension ray	Generates a field to contain a liquid or a gas.
Television ray	Allows remote observation.
Thought-recording ray	Allows Stardust to telepathically scan a population to reveal criminal intent.
Transforming ray	Changes the form and size of an object or person.
Transmitting ray	Physically lifts and transports identified populations to where Stardust directs them.
Transmuting ray	Changes gas into hard crystal and back again.
Transporting ray	Flies large groups of people back to their individual places of origin.

=== Thought-recording collar ===
Stardust wears a thought-recording collar that reproduces his internal monologue. The recordings are transmitted via thought-recording rays in order to establish telepathic communication with individuals or groups of people. The collar is gold colored and designed in starburst motif. It features a row of red studs similar to the ones found on Stardust's radiation belt.

=== Tubular spacial ===
The tubular spacial is a luminous forcefield that enables Stardust to travel on accelerated super-solar light waves at tremendous speeds. Stardust has been recorded at speeds of up to 300,000 miles a minute (18 million miles an hour). When pushed to its utmost, the tubular spacial leaves a trail of friction-fire in its wake. It is Stardust's primary mode of interplanetary transportation. He is able to control the speed and direction of the tubular spacial at will. The field is impenetrable and virtually indestructible. The tubular spacial generates a null field that neutralized all forms of energy (kinetic, electrical, magnetic, gamma, gravitational, etc.) and also protects him from the crushing forces of acceleration. The tubular spacial preserves and protects him from the vacuum of space. Stardust can use the field for his own use, extend it to accommodate a passenger, or expand it further to encompass a large group of people.

The tubular spacial can discharge a cloud of acid-proof dust that acts as chaff and a radar countermeasure. Stardust can expand the wake of the tubular spacial and generate luminous skywriting.

=== Stardust flash ===
Stardust's trademark flash grants him the power of teleportation, allowing near instantaneous transportation between two fixed points. A brilliant flash shaped like a 5-pointed star accompanies each transfer. The flash can range in size from 10 feet wide to thousands of miles in diameter. There does not seem to be a limit to the distance over which an object can be flashed. However, Stardust has never used his flash outside of a planet's gravity well. His flash can teleport individual objects, people, groups, and even entire facilities. The flash can be further calibrated to target specific individuals, as when Stardust transported the entire staff of the F.B.I. from their offices and left all their office furniture behind. Objects can also be safely transferred into occupied space, as when Stardust instantly outfitted the Sixth Columnists with uniforms. Furthermore, the flash recalibrates and redirects the momentum of the object it transfers. This allows an object to match the relative velocity of its destination. Stardust was able to safely flash the President from a moving plane to the stationary White House in Washington D.C.

Stardust's flash is also capable of affecting the momentum and vector of objects in its immediate vicinity. The flash is capable of affecting local objects, but can be expanded to a planetary scale. Stardust uses his flash to launch his tubular spacial. He also uses the flash at the end of his flight to remove momentum—allowing him to calmly walk out of his star. Stardust routinely uses his flash to enter buildings. If he enters a building after a long interplanetary flight, the building will shake just before he appears. Stardust typically announces his arrival before he appears.

=== Stardust's astral observatory ===
Stardust's headquarters is a crime-detecting laboratory and observation post that is located on what is referred to in early stories as a "private asteroid" and in later stories as his "private star". Stardust's private star has a breathable atmosphere capable of sustaining human and plant life. It features rolling hills, a lush forest, and paved roads. Stardust lives in a massive castle which is a short walk from the observatory. The star has enough mass to sustain a number of small satellites. From his marvelously equipped observatory, Stardust stays apprised of the affairs of the planets. Equipment Stardust has utilized in the Astral Observatory, broken down into categories, include:

==== Crime detection ====
- Crime detector. A delicate crime-detecting unit with a needle gauge that vibrates to alert Stardust when a crime has been planned and is about to be executed.
- Crime-detecting scopes. Various devices that indicate the nature, location, extent, and severity of a crime.

==== Criminal investigation ====
- Long-range televisional finder - a scanner equipped with a widescreen monitor and a thought recorder that tunes into the thoughts of criminals to reveal their whereabouts and current plans to Stardust.
- Panoramic concentration unit reveals the power and influence of an organization and the extent of the crime being perpetrated, allowing Stardust to see the big picture.

==== Remote observation ====
- Dictaphonic view plates. A square monitor that allows Stardust to observe and record criminals from afar.
- Televisional crime-detecting unit. A circular monitor that allows Stardust to remotely observe criminals.
- Interplanetary television set and thought-process unit. A widescreen monitor and speaker system that allows Stardust to remotely observe and translate the thoughts of criminals. One can assume this comes in handy when the criminals are from another planet and speak a different language.
- Super-interplanetary television set. A wall-mounted super-widescreen monitor equipped with an adjustable thought recorder that allows Stardust to observe criminals from afar.
- Crime-detecting ray-phone. A headset with earphones and a view plate that allows Stardust to view criminals from afar.

=== Mobile Technology ===
- Anti-cosmic relayer. A device that reduces the radio frequency of remote controlled missiles and redirect them.
- Concentrator. A handheld wand that draws the heat rays of the Sun and concentrates them into a beam hot enough to melt an entire fortress.
- Panoramic television unit. A tablet-size device that allows Stardust to remotely view multiple sites. Used to observe the actions of the Sixth Column across the world.
- Simplified television unit. A handheld television unit, the size and shape of a smart phone, that allows Stardust to observe criminal activity from afar.
- Super radiophonic sets. Telecommunication devices used by the Sixth Column to contact with Stardust.
- Universal sound plate. A tablet-sized communication device that establishes an audio tele-conference with the operators of his super radiophonic sets.

== Reception ==
In American Comic Book Chronicles: 1940-1944, comics historian Kurt Mitchell writes that the Stardust stories "highlighted Hanks' straitfaced absurdity and distinctively ugly dramatis personae. In style and attitude, Hanks anticipated the underground comics of the 1960s and early '70s".
