= Bronze Man =

Publication information
- Publisher: Fox Feature Syndicate
- First appearance: Blue Beetle #42 (July/August 1946)
- Created by: A.C. Hollingsworth (art)

In-story information
- Alter ego: Randy Ronald
- Abilities: Minimal superhuman strength Flight

Bronze Man is a comic book superhero in comics published by Fox Feature Syndicate. He first appeared in Blue Beetle #42 (July/August 1946).

== Fictional character biography ==
Bronze Man was originally U.S. Army Air Force flying ace Randy Ronald. Ronald was declared M.I.A. after being shot down over enemy territory. Unknown to the authorities, he had been captured by the enemy, who tortured and disfigured him before he could escape. Once free, he vowed to exterminate brute force and injustice. He took his name from the bronze mask he wore to hide his injuries.

== Powers and abilities ==
Bronze Man exhibited some level of superhuman strength. In one adventure, he stopped a car from going off a cliff by holding it with his legs while hanging from a tree branch with his arms. He also had the ability to fly. No origin was given for his powers.
