= Zago (character) =

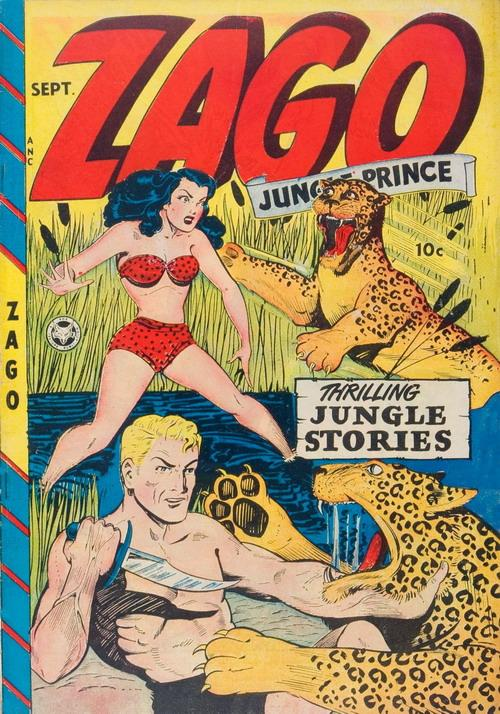
- Zago and Wana on the cover of Zago, Jungle Prince #1.

Publication information
- Publisher: Fox Feature Syndicate
- First appearance: Zago, Jungle Prince #1 (September 1948)

In-story information
- Abilities: None

Zago is a fictional character who appeared in comic books published by Fox Feature Syndicate. He first appeared in Zago, Jungle Prince #1 (September 1948).

Zago was a jungle adventurer, very much like the more popular Tarzan. He was accompanied by his mate Wana, who bore a more than passing resemblance to Sheena.
