= Weird Comics =

Comic book series

Publication information
- Publisher: Fox Feature Syndicate
- Schedule: Monthly
- Format: Anthology
- Genre: Superhero
- Publication date: Apr 1940 – Jan 1942
- No. of issues: 20

Weird Comics was a comic book published by Fox Feature Syndicate from 1940 to 1942.

Weird Comics' characters included Birdman, Sorceress of Zoom, The Dart, Thor, Dynamite Thor, The Eagle, Dynamo and the Black Rider.
