= Doctor Hormone =

Character published by Dell Comics in the 1940s

Publication information
- Publisher: Dell Comics
- First appearance: Popular Comics #54 (August 1940)
- Created by: Bob Bugg

In-story information
- Alter ego: Unknown
- Team affiliations: Jane (granddaughter, Sidekick); Novoslavia armed forces United States Army
- Notable aliases: "Master of Human Chemistry"
- Abilities: Scientific genius Longevity; Superhuman strength (temporary); Superhuman voice (temporary); Superhuman breath (temporary)

Doctor Hormone is a character created by Bob Bugg, who briefly appeared in comic books published by Dell Comics in the 1940s. Popular culture historian Ron Goulart calls him "one of the truly wacky creations of comics."

== Publication history ==
Doctor Hormone first appeared in Popular Comics #54 (Aug 1940), and his adventures ran until issue #60 (Feb 1941).

American Comic Book Chronicles by Kurt Mitchell and Roy Thomas assert that the character was dropped because of the use of the Ku Klux Klan as villains: "Though down to approximately 30,000 members in 1941 (from a high of 4,000,000 a decade and a half earlier), the Klan and its sympathizers, many of them in positions of prominence, were still dangerous. To call them out as murderers and traitors, even in the pages of a comic book, was brave, perhaps too brave for Dell executives. Dr. Hormone was gone following issue #60, his storyline interrupted mid-cliffhanger."

== Fictional character biography ==
Doctor Hormone was an elderly scientist who, having discovered the secret of life itself, injected himself with a "youth hormone" which restored his body to youthful vigor. After agents from Urasia stole his formulas from his laboratory to aid in their nation's wars against its neighbors, Doctor Hormone and his scrappy, wisecracking granddaughter Jane traveled to the besieged nation of Novoslavia, where he used his scientific expertise to help battle the Urasian invaders, who were using the hormones to create armies of part animal/part human men. Later, Doctor Hormone was employed as a researcher for the United States Army and worked in a laboratory at Fort Knox.

Doctor Hormone was later summoned by a disembodied voice called the Thinker who temporarily endowed him with superhuman powers to fight off an invasion of Texas by the Nazians.

Towards the end of his run, Doctor Hormone discovered that the Ku Klux Klan were acting as a fifth column for the Nazians. He and Jane were tied to burning crosses, but they were freed by the Five Fleamen, a special task force which Hormone had created.

In the final chapter, the Thinker brought Hormone and Jane to his headquarters, in the primordial chaos. They fell into a state of suspended animation, and have, as yet, not been seen since.

== Powers and abilities ==
Doctor Hormone is a scientific genius who develops powerful "hormones" which are capable of creating great changes in the human body, including restoring youth and transforming people into animals or bizarre human-animal hybrids.

The Thinker endowed Doctor Hormone with powers that included superhuman strength, the ability to grow to giant size, a stentorian voice, and super-breath.

Janey, while not possessed of any superhuman abilities, is fearless and resourceful, proving a worthy partner-in-crimefighting to her "Gramps." Though an adolescent, she is proficient with firearms, can skydive, and soldiers obey her orders without question.
