= Flame (comics) =

Superhero character

The Flame
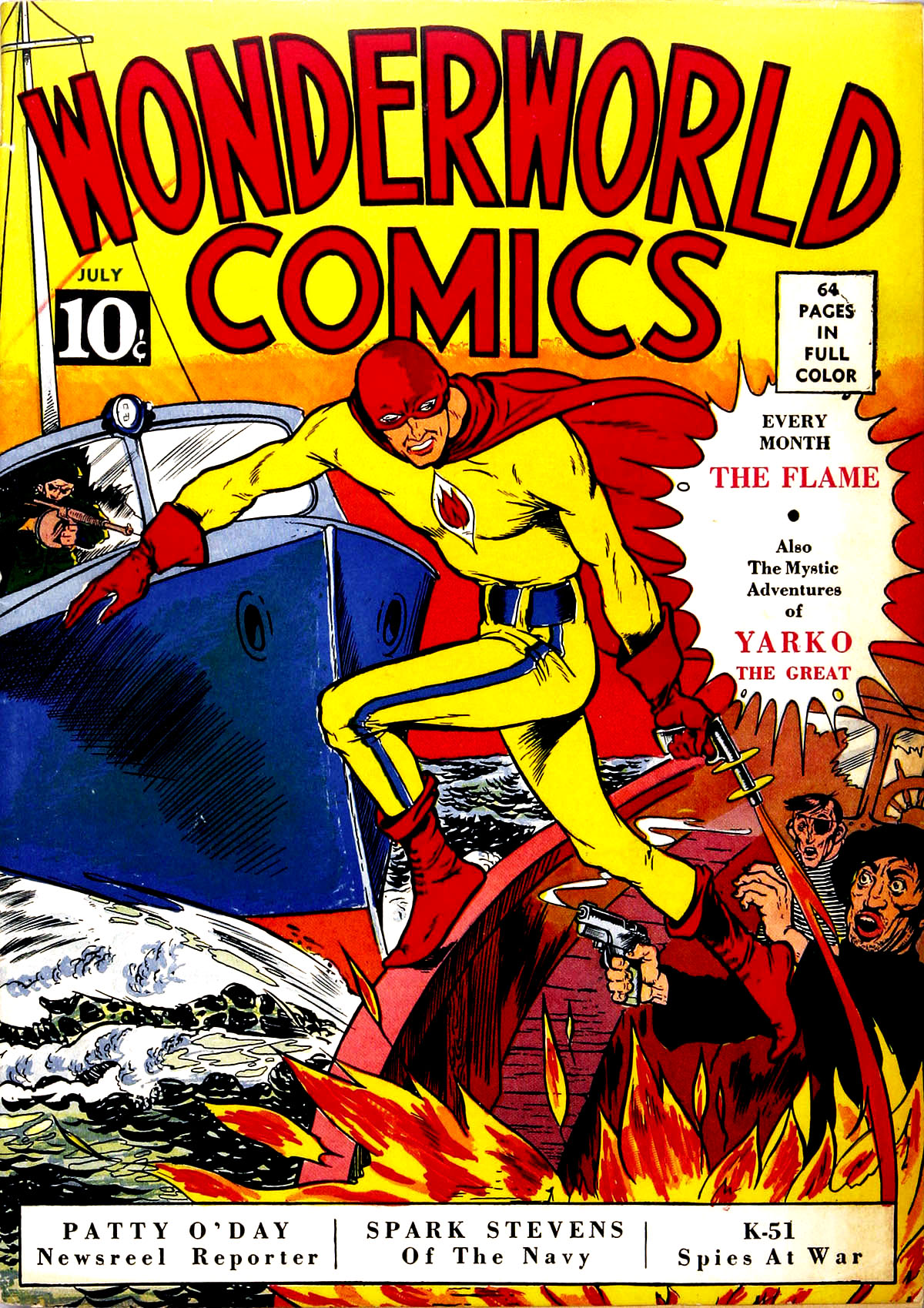
- The Flame, on the cover of Wonderworld Comics #3 (1939).

Publication information
- Publisher: Fox Feature Syndicate
- First appearance: Wonderworld Comics #3 (July 1939)
- Created by: Will Eisner (writer); Lou Fine (artist)

In-story information
- Alter ego: Gary Preston
- Species: Human
- Abilities: Fire and heat manipulation Teleportation via fire Carries a pistol-sized flamethrower

The Flame is a superhero that appeared in American comic books published by Fox Feature Syndicate. The Flame first appeared in Wonderworld Comics #3 (July 1939) and was created by writer Will Eisner and artist Lou Fine. The Flame became Wonderworld's primary character.

== Publication history ==
The Flame's first appearance was in Fox's Wonderworld Comics #3, dated July 1939, (issues #1 & #2 being titled Wonder Comics). The Flame gained his own title in the summer of 1940; which ran for eight issues until January 1942. He was one of the titular Big 3, appearing in that periodical alongside Blue Beetle and Samson. Fox Publications folded in 1942, being forced to declare involuntary bankruptcy owing its creditors some $175,000.

== Fictional character biography ==
The Flame's secret identity is Gary Preston. When Gary was a baby, his father Charteris Preston worked as a missionary in China. The elder Preston was washed away in a flood, but managed to save baby Gary by placing him in a basket. The basket was washed downstream to Tibet, where Gary was rescued by a group of lamas. They raised Gary in the lamasery, where they trained him in their mystical ways. Through this training, Gary gained the ability to control fire and temperature, including his own body temperature. He also gained the ability to travel from place to place by materializing inside of flame (even a match flame).

When he reached adulthood, Gary returned to America to fight crime as the Flame. He used a flamethrower-gun, as well as a special car, boat and plane. In Wonderworld Comics #30 (October 1941) The Flame was joined by a female sidekick, Flame Girl. Flame Girl was secretly Linda Dale, who was given similar powers as the Flame when Gary Preston was injured.

According to Jess Nevins' Encyclopedia of Golden Age Superheroes, the Flame "battles arsonists, dictators, German mad scientists, an enormous creature called the Beast, and river pirates".

== Powers and abilities ==
Thanks to his training, the Flame has the ability to control fire and heat. He can raise his own body temperature to the point where he can burst into flames, or melt bullets. He can control and direct any flame in his presence. He can also teleport from place to place by appearing inside of any fire source, no matter the size. The Flame's one weakness is water, which can severely weaken him. In order to provide fire whenever he needs it, the Flame carries a small, pistol-sized flamethrower.

== 2010s ==
The Flame is one of the many public domain Golden Age characters appearing in Project Superpowers, a series released by Dynamite Entertainment.
