= Fantastic Comics =

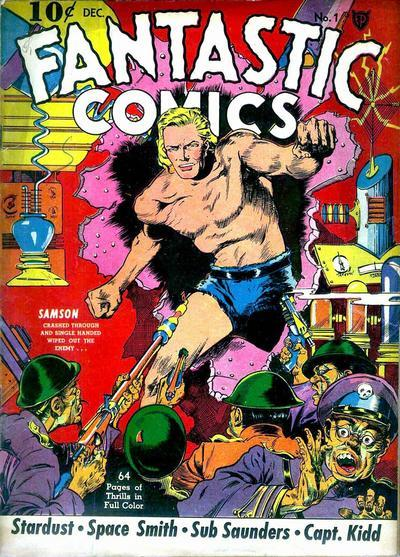
- Fantastic Comics #1 (December 1939)

Publication information
- Publisher: Fox Feature Syndicate
- Genre: Superhero
- Publication date: December 1939 – November 1941
- No. of issues: 23
- Main character(s): Black Fury; Samson; Stardust the Super Wizard

Fantastic Comics was an American comic book superhero anthology title published by Fox Feature Syndicate during the Golden Age of Comic Books. The title introduced the characters Banshee, Black Fury (John Perry), Nagana, Queen of Evil, Samson by Will Eisner and Alex Blum, and Stardust the Super Wizard by Fletcher Hanks.

== Publication history ==
The first issue is cover-dated December 1939. Fantastic Comics continued to run until issue #23 in November 1941.

Most of the characters appearing in Fantastic Comics eventually fell into the public domain. In 2008, as part of the Next Issue Project, Image Comics revived the title with a single issue, "#24". This issue features the following characters:

- Samson, written and illustrated by Alex Boon
- Flip Falcon
- Golden Knight, co-written and illustrated by Thomas Yeates and Bryan Rutherford
- Yank Wilson, written and illustrated by Andy Kuhn
- Space Smith, written and illustrated by Tom Scioli
- Captain Kidd, written and illustrated by Jim Rugg
- Professor Fiend, written and illustrated by Fred Hembeck
- Sub Saunders, written and illustrated by Ashley Wood
- Stardust the Super Wizard, written by Joe Keatinge and illustrated by Mike Allred
- A prose piece featuring Carlton Riggs by B. Clayton Moore with illustration by Jason Latour
