= Mystery Men Comics =

Comic book series

Publication information
- Publisher: Fox Feature Syndicate
- Schedule: Monthly
- Format: Standard
- Publication date: August 1939 – February 1942
- No. of issues: 31
- Main character(s): Green Mask; Blue Beetle; Rex Dexter

Mystery Men Comics was an anthology American comic book series from the Golden Age of Comic Books published by Fox Feature Syndicate. The series was Fox's second title after the Wonderworld Comics series being first published in August 1939. The series would debut two superheroes in its first issue: the Green Mask and Dan Garret (the first Blue Beetle who would later have his own spinoff series). The first issue was also notable for being one of the two comic book issues debuting John Tuska's work. The series would end in issue #31 in February 1942. Despite this and Fox's cancellation, the superhero Blue Beetle that the series helped to introduce would live on through Charlton and later DC Comics.
