= Green Mask =

The Green Mask is the name of two comic book superheroes, both published by Fox Feature Syndicate. Both are in the public domain with some of the original stories having been reprinted by AC Comics.

== Michael Shelby ==
The Green Mask
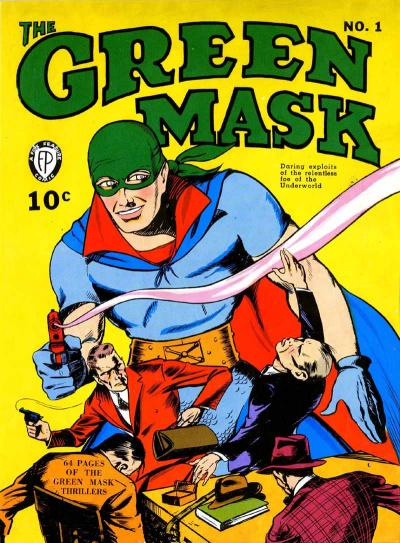
- The first Green Mask

Publication information
- Publisher: Fox Feature Syndicate
- First appearance: Mystery Men Comics #1 (August 1939)
- Created by: Walter Frehm (art)

In-story information
- Alter ego: Michael Shelby (originally "Selby")
- Partnerships: Domino
- Abilities: Superhuman strength Flight; Use of gun

The first Green Mask debuted in Fox's Mystery Men Comics #1 (August 1939). The writer was not credited (although it may have been Will Eisner); the artwork was provided by Walter Frehm. This Green Mask's final appearance was in Mystery Men Comics #31 (February 1942).

Originally, the Green Mask really is a mystery man; the secret identity of this "modern Robin Hood" is kept from the readers for his earliest appearances and known only to reporter "News" Doakes (later "News" Blake), who is the only one who can contact the pulp-style costumed vigilante when needed.

With the start of the solo Green Mask title in Summer 1940, the character was retooled. The hero is revealed to be Michael Shelby (or Selby, in some early stories), a wealthy private investigator and son of a crusading Senator murdered by white-hooded gangsters known as the Grim Circle. He is transformed into a super-powered "Miracle Man" (no relation) after being exposed to an experimental "vita-ray" machine created by family friend Professor Lascomb.

In Green Mask #1 (1940), he's joined by a young orphan named Don who, after surviving an explosion meant for the Green Mask, is taken in by the hero and becomes his non-powered, boomerang-throwing sidekick, Domino the Miracle Boy, wearing a costume almost identical to his own. Eventually, Shelby leaves behind his playboy lifestyle when he meets girlfriend Olivia Tracy on a case in Green Mask #6 (1941).

According to Jess Nevins' Encyclopedia of Golden Age Superheroes, "The Green Mask fights Yellow Peril Tong lords, hooded master criminals, counterfeiters, crime syndicates, mummies, and hunchbacked mad scientists".

In Project Superpowers, Domino makes an appearance in the second series as part of a team of former sidekicks known as the Inheritors. The Green Mask does not appear.

=== Powers and abilities ===
Originally, the first Green Mask had no superpowers. Despite this, the first issue of his series retconned his origin so that he became the Green Mask after gaining a number of superpowers after being exposed to vita-rays, including superhuman strength and the ability to fly. He would occasionally display other powers like invulnerability, usually as required by the plot. In addition to super powers, the Green Mask carried a gun (usually a revolver or an automatic, although he briefly used a "paralyzer pistol" he had confiscated from a mad scientist) for those times when being super was just not enough.

== Johnny Green ==
The Green Mask
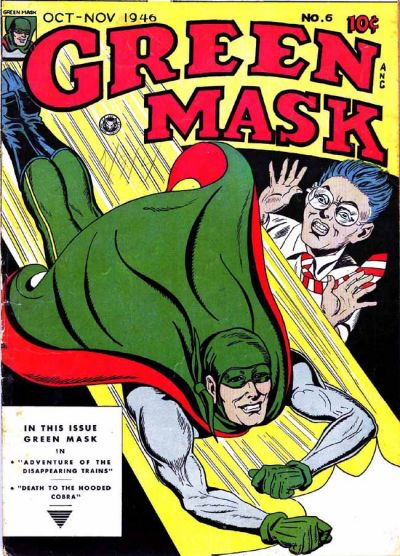
- The second Green Mask, in his final appearance

Publication information
- Publisher: Fox Feature Syndicate
- First appearance: The Green Mask #10 (August 1944)

In-story information
- Alter ego: Johnny Green
- Abilities: Ability to transform into a superhuman adult when angry

Fox Feature re-introduced the Green Mask moniker in issue #10 of The Green Mask (August 1944); the artist and writer were uncredited. In this version, the Green Mask is secretly Johnny Green. He is the son of a previous Green Mask, named Walter Green.

Johnny is a meek bespectacled teenager often taunted as a "sissy boy" by his high school peers who transforms into an adult "Avenger of Wrong" whenever he becomes angry and cries out at any display of injustice ("Eee-ow!"), changing back once he has finished beating up the bad guys, grows tired and yawns (making him a sort of cross between Captain Marvel and the Hulk). While some stories have him aware of his alter-ego, others indicate that he either doesn't retain the memory of anything he did while transformed or perceives them as only a dream.

The motherless Johnny lives in a rented room above the exclusive Miramar Club while his father is off serving in the army in Europe; he survives on his father's savings and the kindness of the club's owner, Punchy. He has a dog named Curly and a much more outgoing and courageous girlfriend named Suzie who's unaware of his dual identity.

The second Green Mask's final appearance was in The Green Mask #17 (October–November 1946).

=== Powers and abilities ===
Johnny Green transforms into the adult Green Mask whenever he becomes angry, gaining all the powers of the previous Green Mask.
