= Lou Fine =

American comic book artist

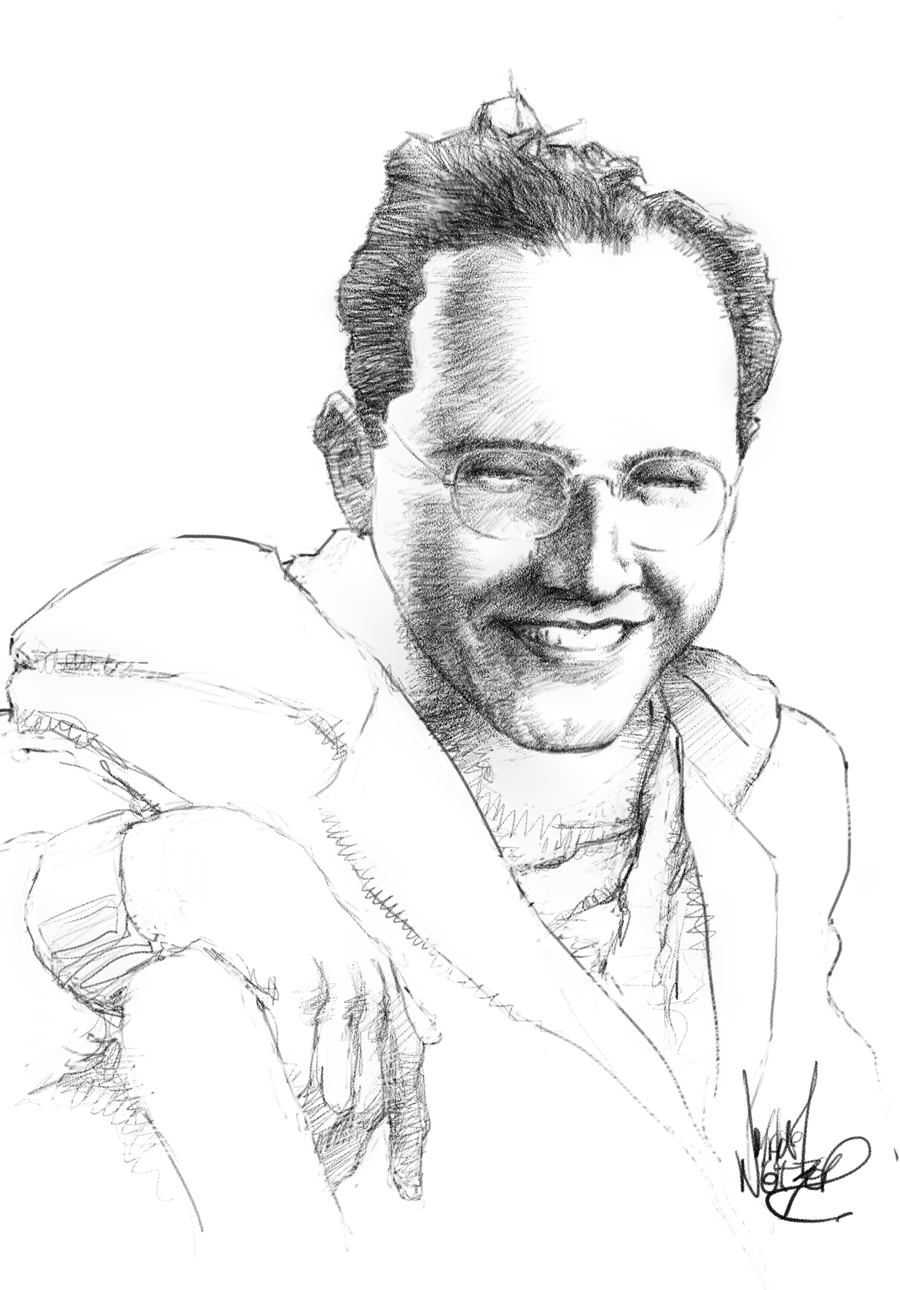
- Lou Fine by Michael Netzer
- Born: Louis Kenneth Fine; November 26, 1914 New York City, U.S.
- Died: July 24, 1971 (aged 56)
- Areas: Penciller, Inker
- Pseudonyms: Fred Sande, Curt Davis, Basil Berold, Kenneth Lewis, E. Lectron

Louis Kenneth Fine (November 26, 1914 – July 24, 1971) was an American comic book artist known for his work during the 1940s Golden Age of comic books, where his draftsmanship became an influential model to a generation of fellow comics artists.

== Biography ==
=== Early life and career ===
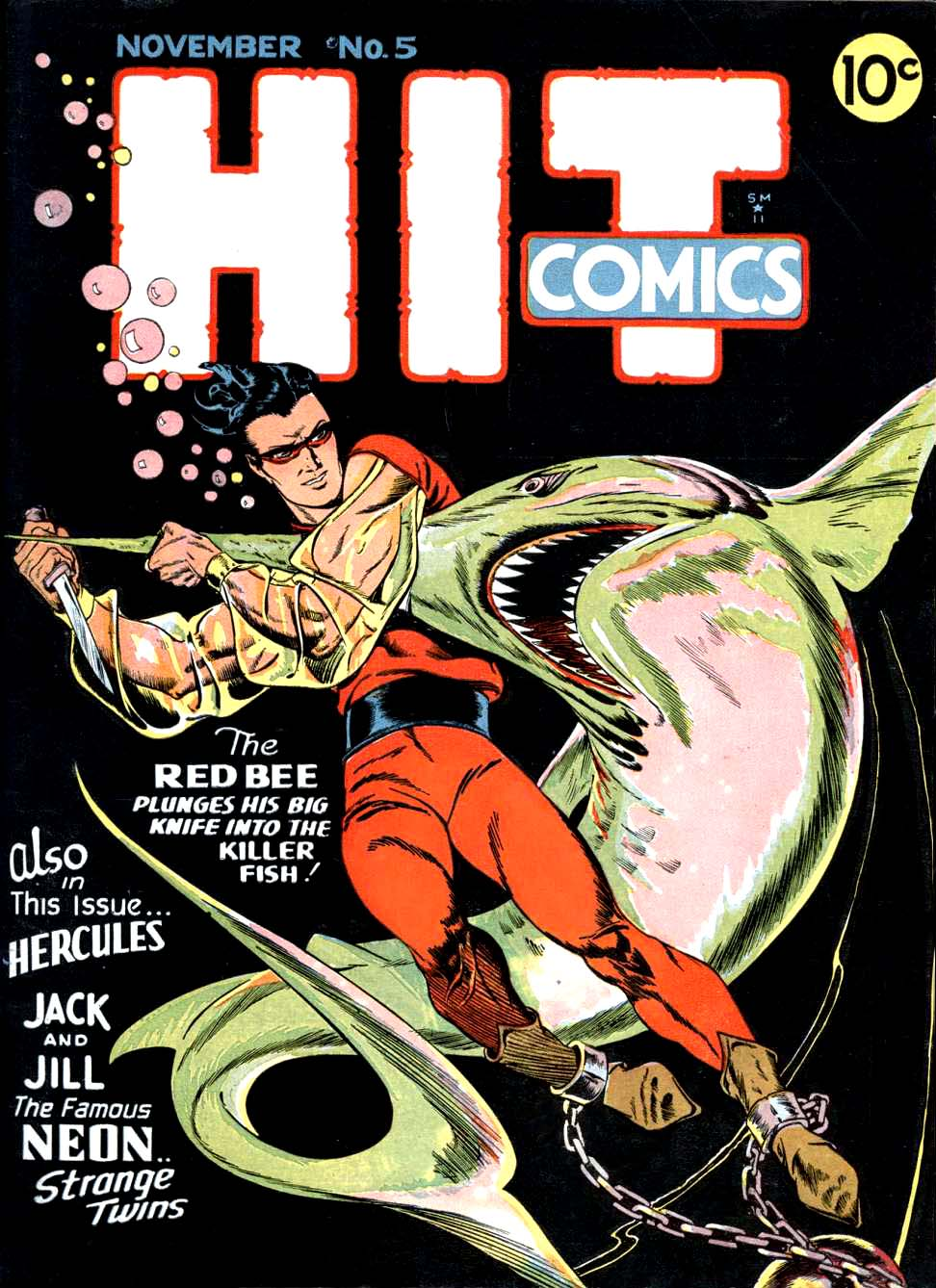
Hit Comics #5 (Nov. 1940). This cover, used in The Steranko History of Comics 2 (1972), helped introduce Fine's art to a new generation.

Lou Fine was born to a Jewish family in either the Manhattan or Brooklyn boroughs of New York City, the son of a house painter, Meyer, who was possibly a Russian immigrant. Fine's mother died while Fine was attending Cooper Union college, studying engineering. He had an older brother, Sam, who died in October 2000, at age 86, and a sister. According to Fine's son Elliot, Lou Fine's family lived in the Brooklyn neighborhood of "East New York, which was called Brownsville in those days.... It was a tenement Jewish neighborhood back then".

Either at about age two or in his early teens, Fine's left leg became crippled by polio. Developing a talent for art, and influenced by such commercial illustrators and other artists as Dean Cornwell, Heinrich Kley, and J.C. Leyendecker, Fine went on to study at Manhattan's Grand Central Art School and Brooklyn's Pratt Institute. In 1938, Fine, like many other comics artists of the time, found work at Eisner & Iger, a prominent "packager" that supplied complete comic books to publishers testing the emerging medium. Fine's first published comics art was the strip "Wilton of the West" in Fiction House's Jumbo Comics #4 (Dec. 1938), signed with the house pen name Fred Sande (which strip originator Jack Kirby had used in previous issues). Other early pseudonyms Fine employed (reflecting the fledgling Eisner & Iger's attempts to convince publishers they had a large stable of artists) were Curt Davis and Basil Berold. Eisner would later say, "I had respect for his towering kind of draftsmanship. He was the epitome of the honest draftsman. No fakery, no razzle-dazzle — very direct, very honest in his approach".

Fine went on to do exquisite and acclaimed work for Fox Feature Syndicate, where he supplied the cover of 1939's Blue Beetle #1 and drew such features as "The Flame" in Wonderworld Comics and the later eponymous series. For publisher Everett M. "Busy" Arnold's Quality Comics, he drew features including "The Black Condor" (initially under the pseudonym Kenneth Lewis) in Crack Comics; "Doll Man" (under the pseudonym William Erwin Maxwell) in Feature Comics; "The Ray" (initially under the jokey pseudonym E. Lectron) in Smash Comics; "Uncle Sam" (for which Eisner & Iger co-founder Will Eisner received credit) in National Comics; and "Stormy Foster" in Hit Comics. Fine became particularly prominent as a cover artist.

Fine, along with Plastic Man creator Jack Cole, was a ghost artist on Will Eisner's celebrated Sunday-supplement newspaper comic book The Spirit during Eisner's World War II military service, Fine inking over Cole's pencil work. Some of these were reprinted in Quality's Police Comics and The Spirit comic book, where Fine's work continued to appear through 1949, five years after Fine had left comics.

Joe Simon, an artist and the first editor of Marvel Comics, called Fine his "favorite artist.... He was also Jack Kirby's favorite artist. I know that Jack was a fan of and greatly influenced by Fine's work". Fine is credited with being the first comics artist to draw a line of saliva running between the upper and lower teeth in a character's open mouth (a device commonly associated with Kirby).

=== Advertising and comic strips ===
Leaving comic books in 1944, Fine segued into newspapers by drawing Sunday advertising comics. Starting out at Johnstone and Cushing, he formed his own company with Don Komisarov, whom he had met doing The Throp Family for Liberty in 1946. He had many accounts, but his two most enduring were the series he did for Philip Morris USA and the Sam Spade strip for Wildroot Cream-Oil.

He later drew the comic strips Taylor Woe (1949), Adam Ames (1959) and Peter Scratch (1965). In a single return to comic books, he contributed to a toy company's custom one-shot, Wham-O Giant Comics (1967), illustrating a two-page story, "The Man From Aeons", starring a prehistoric man who, though named "Tor", was not the same-name caveman character created in the 1950s by Joe Kubert.

Fine also worked on the strip Space Conquerors in the magazine Boys' Life from the late 1960s until his death. He and writer Gill Fox, whom he had met during his time with Eisner & Iger and remained in contact with, were developing new comic strips when Fine was found dead of a heart attack in his studio.

=== Later life ===
By the late 1960s, Fine lived in Lido Beach, New York, on Long Island, owning two houses there.

== Collections ==
Fine's Spirit work has been reprinted in DC Comics' hardcover collections The Spirit Archives vols. 5 to 9 (2001–2003), spanning July 1942 to December 1944.

Selections of Fine's other comics works, including the Flame, Doll Man, Uncle Sam, the Ray, and Black Condor, have been reprinted in Pure Imagination's Lou Fine Reader, by Greg Theakston, vols. 1 (2003, ISBN 1-56685-025-8) and 2.

== See also ==
- Charles Sultan, Fine's brother-in-law
