= Samson (Fox Feature Syndicate) =

American comics superhero, created 1939

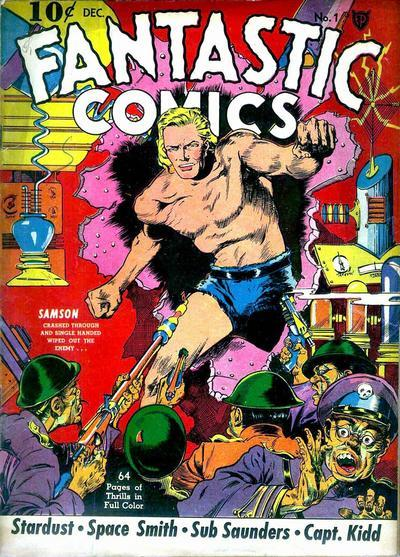
- Samson, on the cover of Fantastic Comics #1 (1939).

Publication information
- Publisher: Fox Feature Syndicate
- First appearance: Fantastic Comics #1 (Dec. 1939)
- Created by: Will Eisner (writer, uncredited); Alex Blum (artist, as Alex Boon)

In-story information
- Species: Human
- Abilities: Superhuman strength and endurance Invunerability

Samson is a superhero who appeared in comic books published by Fox Feature Syndicate. He first appeared in Fantastic Comics #1 (Dec. 1939). The writer was uncredited, but is believed to be Will Eisner; the artist was Alex Blum, using the pseudonym "Alex Boon".

== Publication history ==
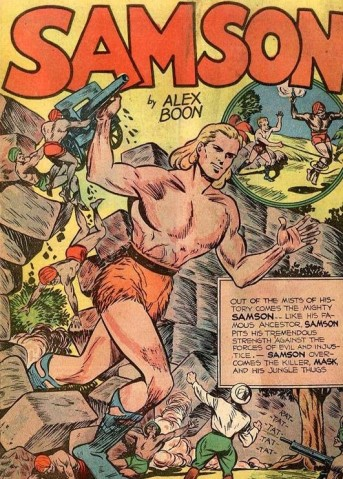
Page from Samson comics #1 (1940), origin of Samson.

After appearing in Fantastic Comics in 1939, Samson was given his own title in the fall of 1940. He simultaneously appeared in Big 3 comics, along with The Flame and the Blue Beetle. Samson's origin story was revealed in Samson comics #1.

Fantastic Comics ceased publication in November 1941 with issue #23. After six issues, Samson comics was changed to Captain Aero (September 1941) and Samson no longer had his own title. Finally, Samson was replaced in Big 3 comics in issue #7 (Jan. 1942; this issue proved to be last) by the patriotic hero V-Man.

A short-lived revival appeared in 1955 from another publisher, Ajax-Farrell.

Samson is among the public domain characters Image Comics revived in a new anthology title, The Next Issue Project, which premiered in December 2007. As of August 2008, someone thought that another version of the character was slated to appear in the next issue of Savage Dragon.

Project Superpowers, a similar golden-age revival project from Alex Ross and Dynamite Entertainment also announced in 2007, also features a character that is ostensibly the Fox Features Samson, though the visual design seems to have been inspired by the Gold Key Comics character Mighty Samson.

== Background ==
Samson (he had no secret identity, although he was called "Sam" the few times he was shown wearing street clothes) was a direct descendant of the biblical figure of the same name. Like his ancestor, Samson had immense strength and endurance, but could lose his powers when his hair was cut. Samson only learned about his heritage when he was a grown man, after his mother revealed his ancestry.

While in college, his friend Professor Brun showed him a new invention, an "iconoscope", which allowed the viewer to watch remote scenes without a transmitter. The iconoscope picked up the image of an eastern holy man, who was praying for a higher power to send someone to battle evil. Samson used his superpowers to visit the holy man, and agreed to be that champion.

According to Jess Nevins' Encyclopedia of Golden Age Superheroes, Samson fights "giant robots, monsters, mad scientists, thugs, dinosaurs, dictators, warmongers, zombies, and radium thieves".

Kurt Mitchell and Roy Thomas wrote: "Pitting his superhuman strength against whole armies, Samson's feats outdid the contemporary Superman but he was far more ruthless, killing his foes barehanded without batting an eye".

In issue #10 of Fantastic Comics, Samson gained a young orphan sidekick whom he named David (his real name was unrevealed). David had no apparent superpowers yet was the sole survivor of a plane crash. Orphaned after the crash, Samson took him into his care. David's role mainly consisted of being rescued by Samson after being captured by criminals.

== Powers and abilities ==
Samson, due to his relation to the Biblical character, had super strength and endurance, and invulnerability. He lost these powers if his hair was cut. These powers were restored once his hair regrew. Samson's hair grew at an accelerated rate.
