= Fox Feature Syndicate =

American comic book publisher (1930s–1950s)

- Industry: Entertainment
- Founded: September 1939; 87 years ago
- Defunct: Mid-1952s
- Headquarters: Massachusetts
- Key people: Victor S. Fox
- Products: Comic books

Fox Feature Syndicate (also known as Fox Comics, Fox Publications, and Bruns Publications, Inc.) was a comic book publisher from early in the period known to fans and historians as the Golden Age of Comic Books. Founded by entrepreneur Victor S. Fox, it produced such titles as Blue Beetle, Fantastic Comics and Mystery Men Comics.

It is not related to the company Fox Publications (a Colorado publisher of railroad photography books), nor 20th Century Fox (formed from Fox Studios and later renamed 20th Century Studios in 2020) and its associated companies.

== History ==
Victor S. Fox and business associate Bob Farrell launched Fox Feature Syndicate at 480 Lexington Avenue in New York City in the late 1930s. For content, Fox contracted with comics packager Eisner & Iger, one of a handful of companies creating comic books on demand for publishers entering the field. Writer-artist Will Eisner, at Victor Fox's request for a hero to mimic the newly created hit Superman, created the superhero Wonder Man for Fox's first publication, Wonder Comics #1 (May 1939), signing his work "Willis". Eisner said in interviews throughout his later life that he had protested the derivative nature of the character and story, and that when subpoenaed after National Periodical Publications, the company that would evolve into DC Comics, sued Fox, alleging Wonder Man was an illegal copy of Superman, Eisner testified that this was so, undermining Fox's case; Eisner even depicts himself doing so in his semi-autobiographical graphic novel The Dreamer. However, a transcript of the proceeding, uncovered by comics historian Ken Quattro in 2010, indicates Eisner in fact supported Fox and claimed Wonder Man as an original Eisner creation.

After losing at trial, Victor Fox dropped Eisner and Iger, and hired his own stable of comic creators, beginning with a New York Times classified ad on December 2, 1939. Joe Simon became Fox Publications' editor.

As one of the earliest companies in the emerging field, it employed or bought the packaged material of a huge number of Golden Age greats, many at the start of their careers. Lou Fine created the superhero The Flame in Wonderworld Comics; Dick Briefer created Rex Dexter of Mars in the eponymous series. George Tuska did his first comics work here with the features "Zanzibar" (Mystery Men Comics #1, Aug. 1939) and "Tom Barry" (Wonderworld Comics #4). Fletcher Hanks wrote and drew Stardust the Super Wizard in Fantastic Comics in 1939 and 1940. Matt Baker, one of the few African-American comic book artists of the Golden Age, revamped – in more than one sense – the newly acquired Quality Comics character Phantom Lady in 1947, creating one of the most memorable and controversial examples of superhero "good girl art".

Future comics legend Jack Kirby, brought on staff here after freelancing for Eisner & Iger, wrote and drew the syndicated newspaper comic strip The Blue Beetle (starting Jan. 1940), starring a character created by Charles Nicholas Wojtkowski in Mystery Men Comics #1 (Aug. 1939). Kirby retained the house name "Charles Nicholas" for the comic strip, which lasted three months. Kirby, additionally, created and did one story each of the Fox features "Wing Turner" (Mystery Men #10, May 1940) and "Cosmic Carson" (Science Comics #4, same month).

Fox Feature Syndicate sponsored a "Blue Beetle Day" at the 1939 New York World's Fair on August 7, 1940, beginning at 10:30 a.m. and including 300 children in relay-race finals at the Field of Special Events, following preliminaries in New York City parks. The race was broadcast over radio station WMCA.

Throughout the 1940s, Fox produced comics in a typically wide variety of genres, but was best known for superheroes and humor. With the post-war decline in superheroes' popularity, Fox, like other publishers, concentrated on horror and crime comics, including some of the most notorious of the latter. Following the establishment of Comics Code Authority in the mid-1950s, Fox went out of business, selling the rights to the Blue Beetle to Charlton Comics.

According to Nicky Wright: "Competing well in the 'most sexy, sadistic, and violent' category, Victor Fox's Murder Incorporated and Blue Beetle are noteworthy.... When historians describe sleaze, sex, and violence as Fox's obsession, they are masters of understatement. His best artists, Jack Kamen and Matt Baker, are much revered and collected for their good girl art. Of special note is the company's breasty crime-fighter-in-bedroom-lingerie, Phantom Lady...along with the wild and scantily attired Rulah, Jungle Goddess".

Boyd Magers said of the publisher: "Never one to overlook a secondary sale, Fox often repackaged four remaindered (unsold) comics into a 25¢ Giant with a new cover, hence Hoot Gibson's Western Roundup, 132 pages dated 1950. However, since Fox always started their stories on the inside front cover (where other publishers ran an ad), these repackaged comics are always missing the first page of story content. Also, since Fox used remaindered issues, contents will vary from copy to copy of Hoot Gibson's Western Roundup".

Fox Feature Syndicate, located at 60 East 42nd Street, filed for Chapter 11 bankruptcy reorganization in July 1950, listing liabilities of $721,448 and assets of $932,878, which included $567,800 in uncollected accounts receivables. Central Color Press of the same address filed likewise, listing liabilities of $513,587 and assets of $603,427. Fox was listed as president of both corporations.

== Victor Fox ==
=== Early life and career background ===
Fox Publications founder Victor Fox was born Samuel Victor Joseph Fox on July 3, 1893, in Nottinghamshire, England, the fourth of six children born to Russian emigres Joseph and Bessie Fox. He had older sisters Annie (b. July 1884), Rosie (b. September 1885), Fanny E. (b. April 1892), and younger sisters Etta G. (b. March 1898) and Marrion (b. May 1900). The family relocated to the United States in March 1898, and within two years were living in Fall River, Massachusetts. By 1917, patriarch Joseph, a storekeeper, moved the family to New York City, where he opened a women's clothing business; the family lived at 555 West 151st Street.

U.S. Attorney Charles H. Tuttle in 1929 arrested several individuals including a Victor S. Fox for illegal "boiler-room" stock-trading. Reports of Fox's September 4 arraignment said his Allied Capital Corporation had offices at 49 Broadway and 331 Madison Avenue, and that Fox also had "desk room" at 230 Park Avenue as Fox Motor and Bank Stock, Inc., and as American Common Stocks, Inc. His hearing was set for September 18. Another individual, J.A. Sachs, was named in the same warrant. A report the following month gave the latter's name as John A. Sacks and identified him as president of Allied Capital and Fox as a director; the two were temporarily enjoined from continuing sales of securities. On November 27, Fox and three other individuals connected with Allied Capital — Fred H. Hallen, I. Lloyd Zimmer, and William McManus — were indicted on charges of mail fraud.

In 1944, an individual named Victor S. Fox, identified as a former partner of the Cornwall Shipbuilding Company, testified in the prosecution of U.S. Army Captain Joseph Gould who was convicted for conspiracy to accept bribes to award $1,000,000 worth of army contracts to the Cornwall Shipbuilding Company.

It is unclear if the individual(s) in these accounts may be future comics publisher Victor Fox. However, a 1946 New York Times real-estate article identifies "Victor S. Fox" as a "magazine publisher" who purchased for occupancy a five-story residential building at 59 E. 82nd Street. In October 1947, a syndicate headed by Fox and also including Central Color Press of Wilkes-Barre, Pennsylvania, purchased Potsdam Paper Mill, Inc., of Potsdam, New York, in order to have what one report called "a completely integrated operation".

=== Comics publisher ===
Historian Jon Berk has written that Fox was an accountant/bookkeeper at the publishing firm that would become DC Comics, where he was privy to sales figures that convinced him to launch his own comic book company. Fellow historian Gerard Jones, writing in his book Men of Tomorrow: Geeks, Gangsters, and the Birth of the Comic Book, was unable to find documentation of this, and Christopher Irving wrote that Fox learned about DC's success while with another magazine distributed by Independent News, DC's distributor.

Artist Jack "King" Kirby said of the employer who gave him his start drawing superhero comics: "Victor Fox was a character. He'd look up at the ceiling with a big cigar, this little fellow, very broad, going back and forth with his hands behind his back saying, 'I'm the King of Comics! I'm the King of Comics!' and we would watch him and, of course, smile a little because he was a genuine type".

Writer/artist Joe Simon commented on Fox: "He was an accountant for DC Comics. He was doing the sales figures and he liked what he saw. So, he moved downstairs and started his own company.... I happened to get a job; I went over to Fox and became editor there, which was just an impossible job, because ... there were no artists, no writers, no editors, no letterers – nothing there. Everything came out of the Eisner and Iger shop. ... He was a very strange character. He had kind of a British accent; he was like 5'2", told us he was a former ballroom dancer. He was very loud, menacing, and really a scary little guy. He used to say, 'I'm the King of the Comics. I'm the King of the Comics. I'm the King of the Comics'. We couldn't stop him".

== Fox characters ==
- The Banshee
- Bird Man
- The Blackbird
- Black Fury and Kid Fury
- Black Lion
- Blue Beetle (later sold to Charlton Comics, who later sold to DC Comics)
- The Bouncer
- Bronze Man
- Captain Savage
- Captain V
- Dagar, the Desert Hawk
- The Dart & Ace, the Bat Boy
- Dynamite Thor
- The Eagle & Buddy (Steven Woods, who as an adult takes on the name Blue Eagle)
- Electro (later known as Dynamo)
- The Flame and Flame-Girl
- The Gorilla with the Human Brain
- Green Mask and Domino
- Illuso
- The Jaguar/Jaguar Man
- Jo-Jo, Congo King
- Lunar the Moon Man
- The Lynx
- Marga the Panther Woman
- Miss X
- The Moth/Mothman
- Nightbird
- Phantom Lady (obtained from Quality Comics via Iger Studios)
- The Purple Tigress
- Rani-Bey
- The Rapier
- The Raven
- Rex Dexter of Mars
- Rulah, Jungle Goddess
- Samson
- Spider Queen (later appeared in Marvel Comics's Invaders series)
- Stardust the Super Wizard
- Tangi
- Tegra, Jungle Empress
- Thor
- The Topper
- Tumbler
- U.S. Jones
- Wonder Man
- The Wraith
- Yarko the Great, Master Magician
- Zago, Jungle Prince
- Zanzibar the Magician

== See Also ==
Golden Age of Comic Books

List of Golden Age comics publishers
