= Superhero =

Type of character

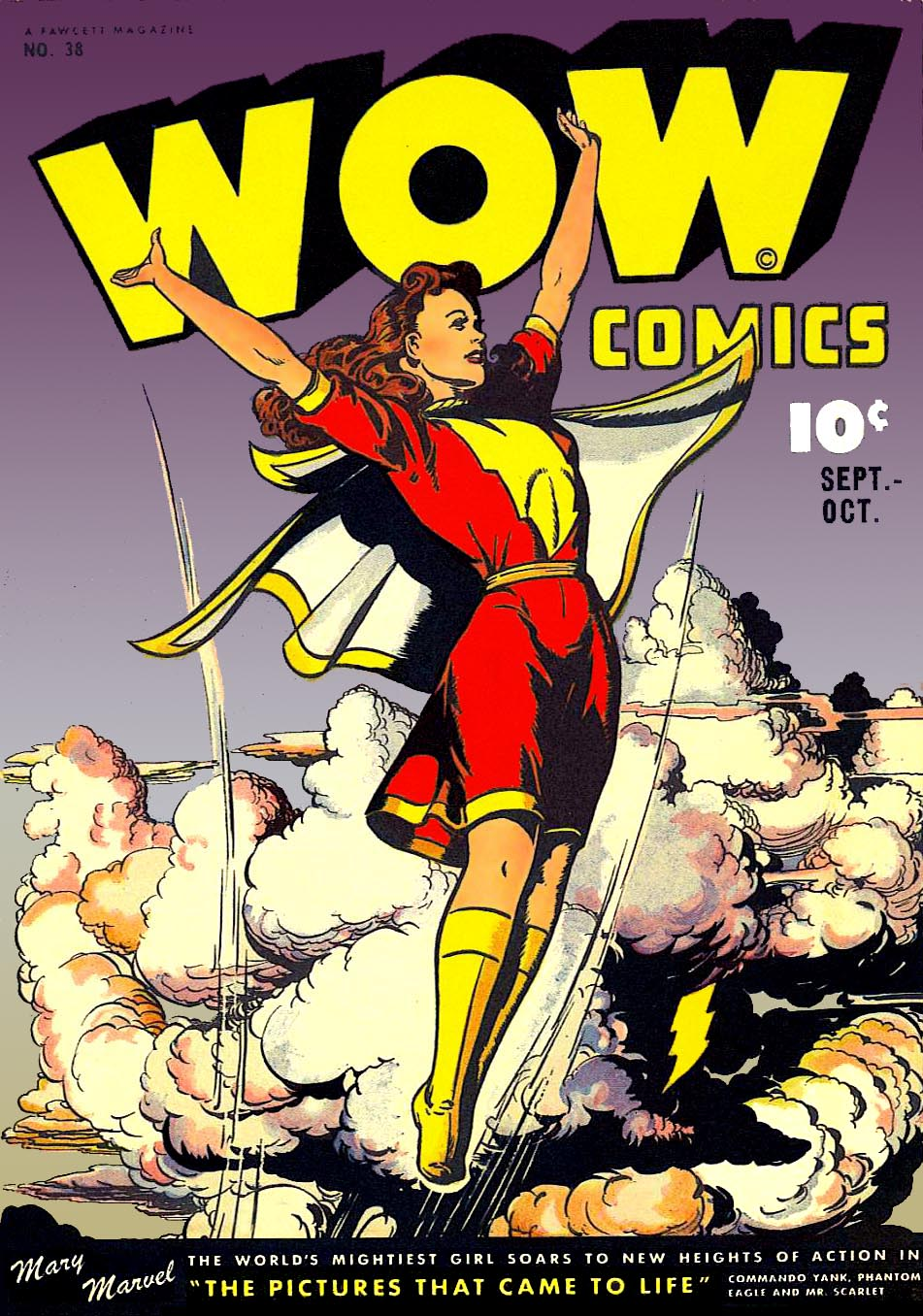
Mary Marvel in the cover of a comic book

A superhero or superheroine is a character who typically possesses superpowers or abilities beyond those of ordinary people; is frequently costumed, concealing their identity; and fits the role of the hero, typically using their powers to help the world become a better place, or dedicating themselves to protecting the public and fighting crime. Superhero fiction is the genre of fiction that is centered on such characters, especially, since the 1930s, in American comic books (and later in Hollywood films, film serials, television and video games), as well as in Japanese media (including kamishibai, tokusatsu, manga, anime and video games).

Superheroes come from a wide array of different backgrounds and origins. Most superheroes (for example, Superman and Spider-Man) usually possess non-human or superhuman biology, while others (such as Batman and Iron Man) derive their status from advanced technology they create and use; others may use or possess objects that have superhuman, mystical, or alien powers (such as Green Lantern and He-Man), or study and practice magic to achieve their abilities (such as Doctor Fate and Doctor Strange). The Dictionary.com definition of "superhero" is "a figure, especially in a comic strip or cartoon, endowed with superhuman powers and usually portrayed as fighting evil or crime," and the Merriam-Webster dictionary gives the definition as "a fictional hero having extraordinary or superhuman powers; also: an exceptionally skillful or successful person." Terms such as masked crime fighters, costumed adventurers or masked vigilantes are sometimes used to refer to characters such as the Spirit, who may not be explicitly referred to as superheroes but nevertheless share similar traits.

Some superheroes use their powers to help fight daily crime while also combating threats against humanity from supervillains, who are their criminal counterparts. Often at least one of these supervillains will be the superhero's archenemy or nemesis. Some popular supervillains become recurring characters in their own right.

== History ==
=== Influences ===
Antecedents of the archetype include mythological characters such as Hanuman, Gilgamesh, Odysseus, and demigods like Heracles, and Perseus, all of whom were blessed with extraordinary abilities, which later inspired the superpowers that became a fundamental aspect of modern-day superheroes. The distinct clothing and costumes of individuals from English folklore, like Robin Hood and Spring-Heeled Jack, also became inspirations. The dark costume of the latter, complete with a domino mask and a cape, became influential for the myriad of masked rogues in penny dreadfuls and dime novels.

The vigilantes of the American Old West also became an influence to the superhero. Several vigilantes during this time period hid their identities using masks. In frontier communities where de jure law was not yet matured, people sometimes took the law into their own hands with makeshift masks made out of sacks. Vigilante mobs and gangs like the San Diego Vigilantes and the Bald Knobbers became infamous throughout that Old West era. Such masked vigilantism later inspired fictional masked crimefighters in American story-telling, beginning with the character Deadwood Dick in 1877.

=== 1900s–1939 ===
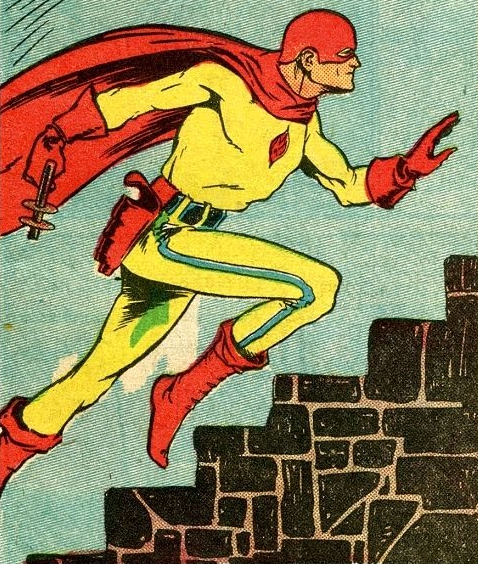
Fox Feature Syndicate's 1930s–1940s superhero the Flame

The word superhero dates back to 1899. The 1903 British play The Scarlet Pimpernel and its spinoffs popularized the idea of a masked avenger and the superhero trope of a secret identity. Over the next few decades, masked and costumed pulp fiction characters such as L'Oiselle (1909), Jimmie Dale/The Grey Seal (1914), Tarzan (1912), John Carter (1912), Zorro (1919), Buck Rogers (1928), The Shadow (1930), Night Hawk (1930), Lensman (1934) and Flash Gordon (1934), film serial heroes Judex (1916) and Ravengar (1916) and comic strip heroes such as the Mandrake the Magician (1934), Magic Phantom (1935), the Phantom (1936), began appearing, as did non-costumed characters with super strength, including the comic-strip characters Patoruzú (1928) and Popeye (1929) and literary characters such as Hugo Danner (Gladiator, 1930) and Aarn Munro (The Mightiest Machine, 1934). Another early example was Sarutobi Sasuke, a Japanese superhero ninja from the Japanese folklore and children's novels in the 1910s; by 1914, he had a number of superhuman powers and abilities. France produced early examples like the superheroine L'Oiselle, created in 1909 by French writer Renée Marie Gouraud d'Ablancourt under her pen name René d'Anjou, and the cyborg Nyctalope (1911), possessing two revolutionary enhancements for the period—enhanced nocturnal vision and an electromechanical cardiac implant.. L'Oiselle, whose real name is Vega de Ortega, is notable as one of literature's earliest winged heroines, utilizing artificial wings for flight. Famany, the "flying man" of a German comic story of 1937, who uses a winged apparatus to fly over New York and who becomes embroiled in the world of crime, had only one appearance.

The pulp magazines of the 1930s served as a crucial breeding ground for early superhero concepts through their innovative comic features:

In August 1936, Thrilling Wonder Stories published Zarnak by Max Plaisted. In August 1937, a letter column of the magazine, the word superhero was used to define the title character. Another groundbreaking character emerged in August 1937, Olga Mesmer, "The Girl with the X-ray Eyes," featured in a single-page comic strip in Spicy Mystery Stories.

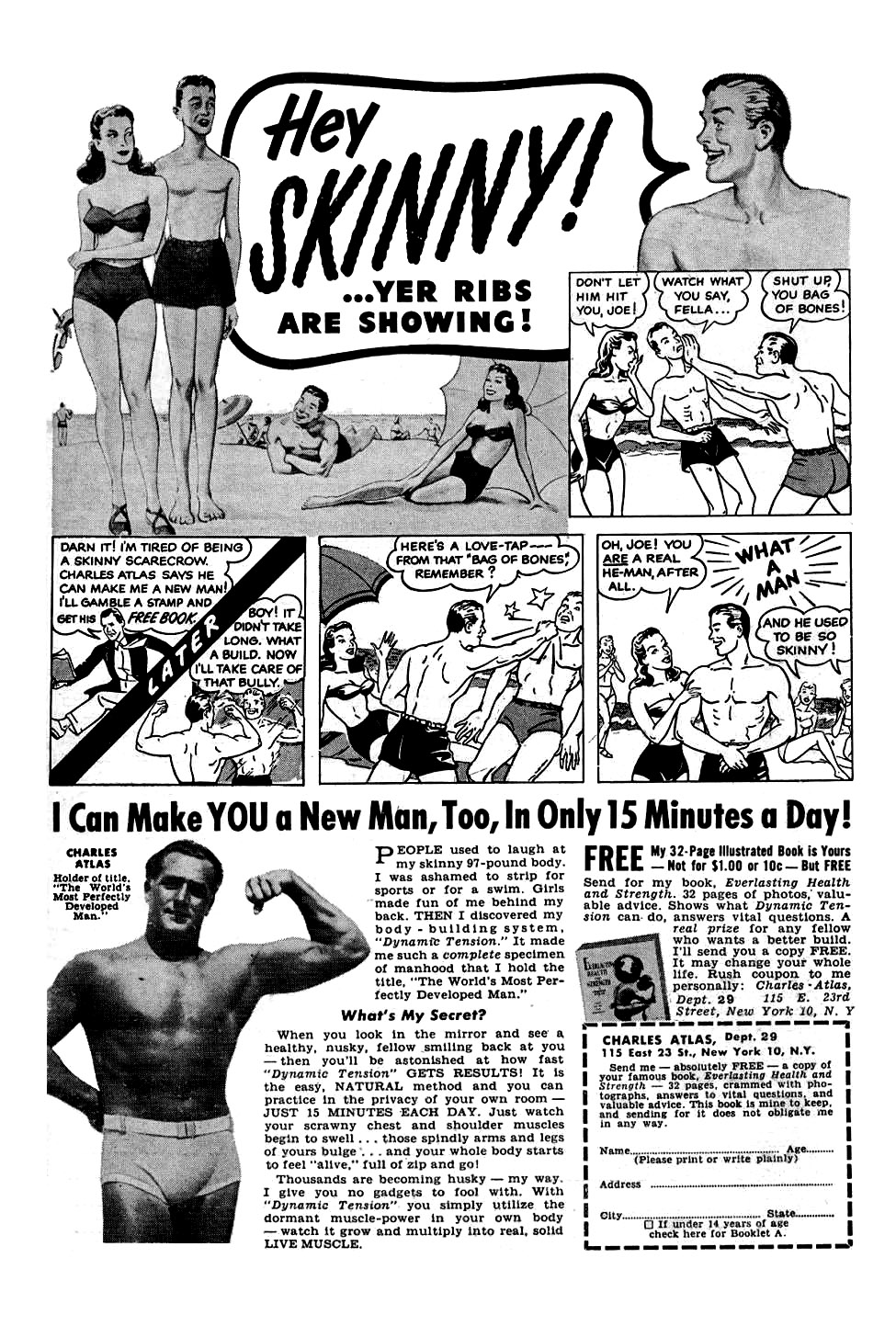
One of Charles Atlas's advertisements.

In addition to fictional sources, the superhero archetype may also have been influenced by real-life strongmen such as Siegmund Breitbart, Joseph Greenstein, Eugen Sandow, and Charles Atlas. Charles Atlas, in particular, gained lasting cultural visibility through his mail-order fitness program and his iconic advertisements published directly in comic books.

The trends converged in some of the earliest superpowered costumed heroes, such as Japan's Ōgon Bat (1931) and Prince of Gamma (early 1930s), who first appeared in kamishibai (a kind of hybrid media combining pictures with live storytelling). Superman (1938) and Captain Marvel (1939) at the beginning of the Golden Age of Comic Books, whose span, though disputed, is generally agreed to have started with Superman's launch. Superman has remained one of the most recognizable superheroes, and his success spawned a new archetype of characters with secret identities and superhuman powers. At the end of the decade, in 1939, Batman was created by Bob Kane and Bill Finger. This era saw the debut of one of the earliest female superheroes, Magician from Mars, created by John Giunta and Malcolm Kildale for Centaur Publications in Amazing-Man Comics. She appeared in five issues (#7–11, Nov 1939 to Apr 1940), predating many other Golden Age superheroines. Jane 6ᴇᴍ35, later known as Q-X3, was a hybrid of Earth and Martian origins born on Mars. As a baby, she was exposed to a beam of cathode rays, which, combined with her hybrid physiology, gave her extraordinary powers, including superstrength, telekinesis, illusion creation, and even matter transformation.

=== 1940s ===
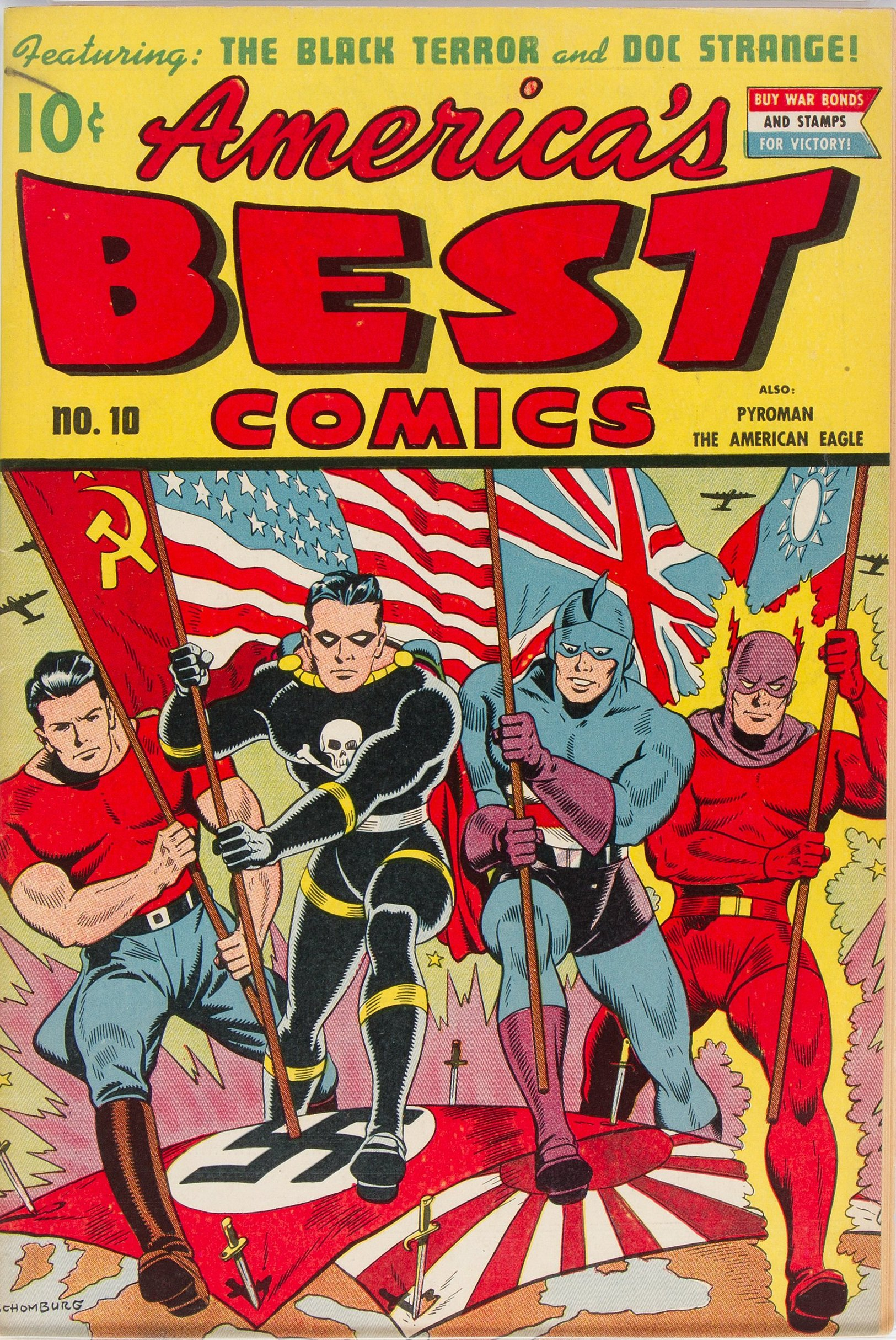
America's Best Comics #7 October 1943

During the 1940s there were many superheroes: The Flash, Green Lantern and Blue Beetle debuted in this era.

Other pioneering superheroines include Fantomah and the Invisible Scarlet O'Neil. Fantomah, created by Fletcher Hanks, was an ageless ancient Egyptian woman in the modern day who could transform into a skull-faced creature with superpowers to fight evil; she debuted in Fiction House's Jungle Comic #2 (Feb. 1940), credited to the pseudonymous "Barclay Flagg". A few months later, the Invisible Scarlet O'Neil, a non-costumed character who fought crime and wartime saboteurs using the superpower of invisibility created by Russell Stamm, would debut in the eponymous syndicated newspaper comic strip a few months later on June 3, 1940.

In 1940, Maximo the Amazing Superman debut in Big Little Book series, by Russell R. Winterbotham (text), Henry E. Vallely and Erwin L. Hess (art).

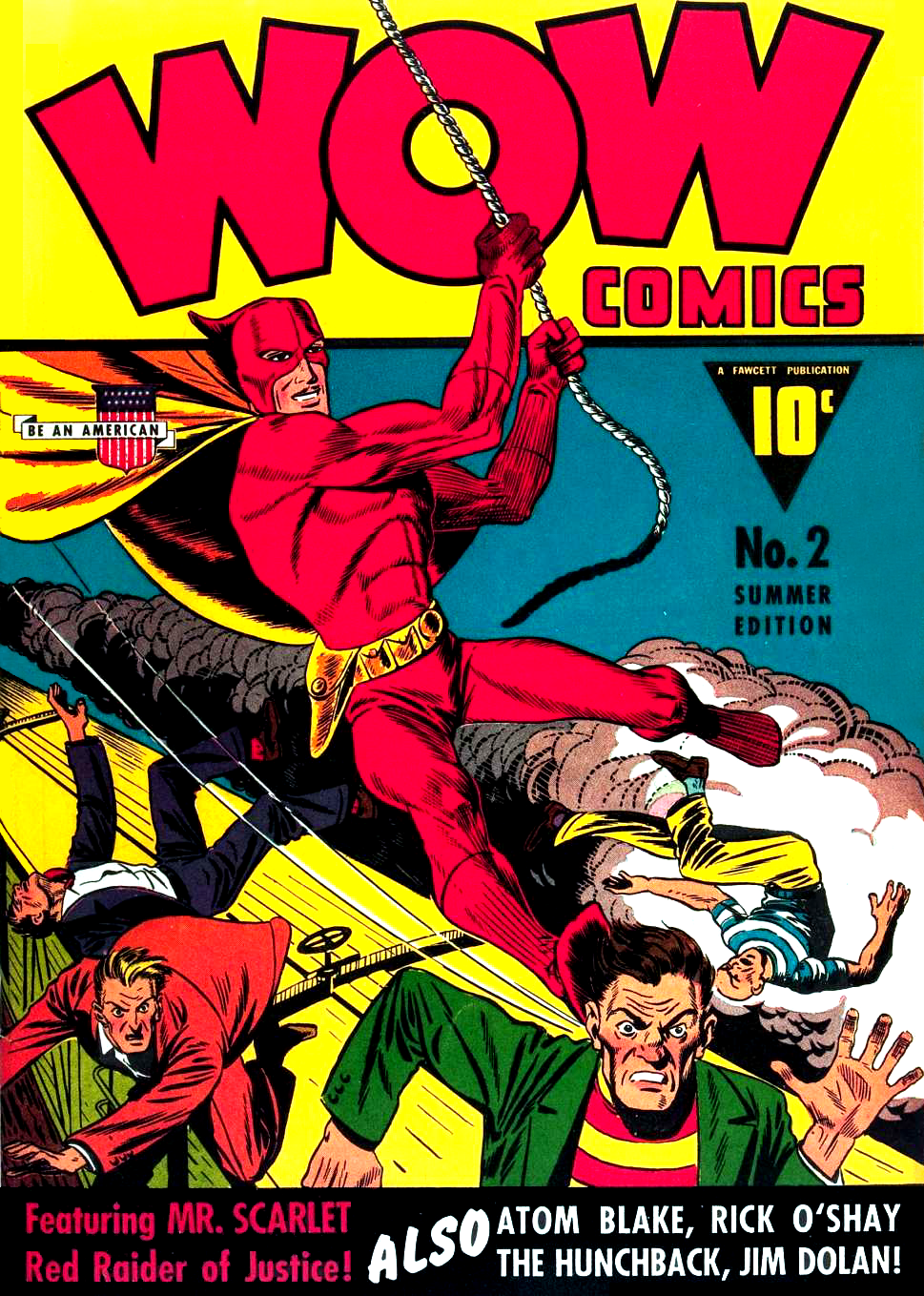
Mr. Scarlet, the "Red Raider of Justice", a superhero appearing in Wow Comics (1940)

Captain America also appeared for the first time in print in December 1940, a year prior to the attack on Pearl Harbor by the Japanese government, when America was still in isolationism. Created by Joe Simon and Jack Kirby, the superhero was the physical embodiment of the American spirit during World War II.

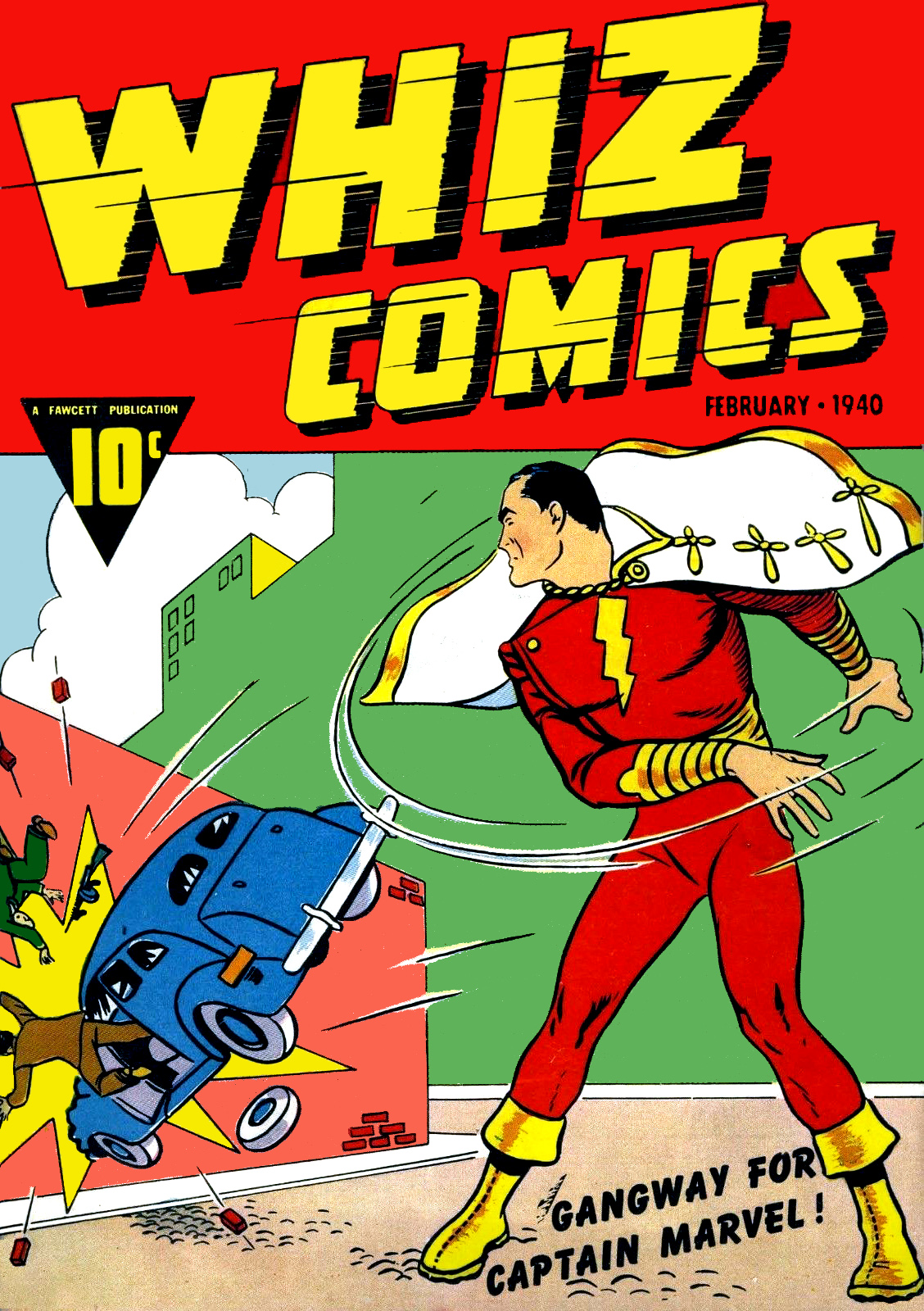
Whiz Comics cover featuring Captain Marvel, published by Fawcett Comics in 1940

One superpowered character was portrayed as an antiheroine, a rarity for its time: the Black Widow, a costumed emissary of Satan who killed evildoers in order to send them to Hell—debuted in Mystic Comics #4 (Aug. 1940), from Timely Comics, the 1940s predecessor of Marvel Comics. Most of the other female costumed crime fighters during this era lacked superpowers. Notable characters include the Woman in Red, introduced in Standard Comics' Thrilling Comics #2 (March 1940); Lady Luck, debuting in the Sunday-newspaper comic-book insert The Spirit Section June 2, 1940; the comedic character Red Tornado, debuting in All-American Comics #20 (Nov 1940); Miss Fury, debuting in the eponymous comic strip by female cartoonist Tarpé Mills on April 6, 1941; the Phantom Lady, introduced in Quality Comics Police Comics #1 (Aug. 1941); the Black Cat, introduced in Harvey Comics' Pocket Comics #1 (also Aug. 1941); and the Black Canary, introduced in Flash Comics #86 (Aug. 1947) as a supporting character. The most iconic comic book superheroine, who debuted during the Golden Age, is Wonder Woman. Modeled from the myth of the Amazons of Greek mythology, she was created by psychologist William Moulton Marston, with help and inspiration from his wife Elizabeth and their mutual lover Olive Byrne. Wonder Woman's first appearance was in All Star Comics #8 (Dec. 1941), published by All-American Publications, one of two companies that would merge to form DC Comics in 1944.

In the 1943 cartoon parody of Superman, Super-Rabbit, Bugs Bunny ingests "super-carrots" created by Professor Cannafraz and acquires various super powers including the ability to fly, super strength and invulnerability. Like his counterpart, Bugs also assumes a mild mannered secret identity by donning glasses and a hat and switches into a super hero costume in a phone booth.

Pérák was an urban legend originating from the city of Prague during the German occupation of Czechoslovakia in the midst of World War II. In the decades following the war, Pérák has also been portrayed as the only Czech superhero in film and comics.

=== 1950s ===
In 1952, Osamu Tezuka's manga Tetsuwan Atom, more popularly known in the West as Astro Boy, was published. The series focused upon a robot boy built by a scientist to replace his deceased son. Being built from an incomplete robot originally intended for military purposes, Astro Boy possessed amazing powers such as flight through thrusters in his feet and the incredible mechanical strength of his limbs.

The 1950s saw the Silver Age of Comics. During this era DC introduced the likes of Batwoman in 1956, Supergirl, Miss Arrowette, and Bat-Girl; all female derivatives of established male superheroes.

In 1957 Japan, Shintoho produced the first film serial featuring the superhero character Super Giant, signaling a shift in Japanese popular culture towards tokusatsu masked superheroes over kaiju giant monsters. Along with Astro Boy, the Super Giant serials had a profound effect on Japanese television. 1958 saw the debut of superhero Moonlight Mask on Japanese television. It was the first of numerous televised superhero dramas that would make up the tokusatsu superhero genre. Created by Kōhan Kawauchi, he followed up its success with the tokusatsu superhero shows Seven Color Mask (1959) and Messenger of Allah (1960), both starring a young Sonny Chiba. A manga adaptation, illustrated by Ippei Kuri (brother of Speed Racer creator Tatsuo Yoshida), was serialized in Bōken Ō magazine.

=== 1960s ===
It is arguable that the Marvel Comics teams of the early 1960s brought the biggest assortment of superheroes ever at one time into permanent publication, the likes of Spider-Man, The Hulk, Iron Man, Daredevil, Nick Fury, Thor, The Avengers (featuring a rebooted Captain America, Thor, Hulk, Ant-Man and Quicksilver), and many others were given their own monthly titles.

Typically the superhero supergroups featured at least one (and often the only) female member, much like DC's flagship superhero team the Justice League of America (whose initial roster included Wonder Woman as the token female); examples include the Fantastic Four's Invisible Girl, the X-Men's Jean Grey (originally known as Marvel Girl), the Avengers' Wasp, and the Brotherhood of Mutants' Scarlet Witch (who later joined the Avengers) with her brother, Quicksilver.

In 1963, Astro Boy was adapted into a highly influential anime television series. Phantom Agents in 1964 focused on ninjas working for the Japanese government and would be the foundation for Sentai-type series. 1966 saw the debut of the sci-fi/horror series Ultra Q created by Eiji Tsuburaya this would eventually lead to the sequel Ultraman, spawning a successful franchise which pioneered the Kyodai Hero subgenre where the superheroes would be as big as giant monsters (kaiju) that they fought.

The kaiju monster Godzilla, originally a villain, began being portrayed as a radioactive superhero in the Godzilla films, starting with Ghidorah, the Three-Headed Monster (1964). By the 1970s, Godzilla came to be viewed as a superhero, with the magazine King of the Monsters in 1977 describing Godzilla as "Superhero of the '70s."

=== 1970s ===
In 1971, Kamen Rider launched the "Henshin Boom" on Japanese television in the early 1970s, greatly impacting the tokusatsu superhero genre in Japan. In 1972, the Science Ninja Team Gatchaman anime debuted, which built upon the superhero team idea of the live-action Phantom Agents as well as introducing different colors for team members and special vehicles to support them, said vehicles could also combine into a larger one. Another important event was the debut of Mazinger Z by Go Nagai, creating the Super Robot genre. Go Nagai also wrote the manga Cutey Honey in 1973; although the Magical girl genre already existed, Nagai's manga introduced Transformation sequences that would become a staple of Magical Girl media.

The 1970s would see more anti-heroes introduced into superhero fiction. Such examples included the debut of Shotaro Ishinomori's Skull Man (the basis for his later Kamen Rider) in 1970, Go Nagai's Devilman in 1972 and Gerry Conway and John Romita's Punisher in 1974.

The dark Skull Man manga would later get a television adaptation and underwent drastic changes. The character was redesigned to resemble a grasshopper, becoming the renowned first masked hero of the Kamen Rider series. Kamen Rider is a motorcycle-riding hero in an insect-like costume, who shouts Henshin (Metamorphosis) to don his costume and gain superhuman powers.

The ideas of second-wave feminism, which spread through the 1960s into the 1970s, greatly influenced the way comic book companies would depict as well as market their female characters: Wonder Woman was for a time revamped as a mod-dressing martial artist directly inspired by the Emma Peel character from the British television series The Avengers (no relation to the superhero team of the same name), but later reverted to Marston's original concept after the editors of Ms. magazine publicly disapproved of the character being depowered and without her traditional costume; Supergirl was moved from being a secondary feature on Action Comics to headline Adventure Comics in 1969; the Lady Liberators appeared in an issue of The Avengers as a group of mind-controlled superheroines led by Valkyrie (actually a disguised supervillainess) and were meant to be a caricatured parody of feminist activists; and Jean Grey became the embodiment of a cosmic being known as the Phoenix Force with seemingly unlimited power in the late 1970s, a stark contrast from her depiction as the weakest member of her team a decade prior.

Both major American publishers began introducing new superheroines with a more distinct feminist theme as part of their origin stories or character development. Examples include Big Barda, Power Girl, and the Huntress by DC comics; and from Marvel, the second Black Widow, Shanna the She-Devil, and The Cat. Female supporting characters who were successful professionals or hold positions of authority in their own right also debuted in the pages of several popular superhero titles from the late 1950s onward: Hal Jordan's love interest Carol Ferris was introduced as the vice-president of Ferris Aircraft and later took over the company from her father; Medusa, who was first introduced in the Fantastic Four series, is a member of the Inhuman Royal Family and a prominent statesperson within her people's quasi-feudal society; and Carol Danvers, a decorated officer in the United States Air Force who would become a costumed superheroine herself years later.

In 1975, Shotaro Ishinomori's Himitsu Sentai Gorenger debuted on what is now TV Asahi, it brought the concepts of multi-colored teams and supporting vehicles that debuted in Gatchaman into live-action and began the Super Sentai franchise (later adapted into the American Power Rangers series in the 1990s). In 1978, Toei adapted Spider-Man into a live-action Japanese television series. In this continuity, Spider-Man had a vehicle called Marveller that could transform into a giant and powerful robot called Leopardon, this idea would be carried over to Toei's Battle Fever J (also co-produced with Marvel) and now multi-colored teams not only had support vehicles but giant robots to fight giant monsters with.

=== 1980–present ===
In subsequent decades, popular characters like Dazzler, She-Hulk, Elektra, Catwoman, Witchblade, Spider-Girl, Batgirl and the Birds of Prey became stars of long-running eponymous titles. Female characters began assuming leadership roles in many ensemble superhero teams; the Uncanny X-Men series and its related spin-off titles in particular have included many female characters in pivotal roles since the 1970s. Volume 4 of the X-Men comic book series featured an all-female team as part of the Marvel NOW! branding initiative in 2013. Superpowered female characters like Buffy the Vampire Slayer and Darna have a tremendous influence on popular culture in their respective countries of origin.

With more and more anime, manga and tokusatsu being translated or adapted, Western audiences were beginning to experience the Japanese styles of superhero fiction more than they were able to before. Saban's Mighty Morphin Power Rangers, an adaptation of Zyuranger, created a multimedia franchise that used footage from Super Sentai. Internationally, the Japanese comic book character, Sailor Moon, is recognized as one of the most important and popular female superheroes ever created.

== Trademark status ==
=== Background ===
The first use of the phrase "super hero" dates back to 1917. At the time, the phrase was merely used to describe a "public figure of great accomplishments." In 1967, Ben Cooper, Inc., an American Halloween costume manufacturer, became the first entity to commercialize the phrase "super hero" when it registered the mark in connection with Halloween costumes. In 1972, Mego Corporation, an American toy company, attempted to register the mark "World's Greatest Superheroes" in connection with its line of action figures. Mego Corporation's attempted registration led Ben Cooper, Inc. to sue Mego Corporation for trademark infringement. Due to its financial struggles, Mego Corporation was unwilling to defend itself against Ben Cooper Inc.'s suit. As a result, in 1977, Mego Corporation jointly assigned its interest in the trademark to DC Comics, Inc. ("DC") and Marvel Comics ("Marvel"). Due to the financial prowess of DC and Marvel, Ben Cooper, Inc. decided to withdraw its trademark opposition and jointly assigned its interest in the "World's Greatest Super Heroes" mark to DC and Marvel. Two years later in 1979, DC and Marvel applied for the mark in connection with comic books, and were granted the mark by the United States Patent and Trademark Office (USPTO) in 1981.

In the years leading up to the assignment of the mark, both DC and Marvel battled to register various trademarks involving the phrase "superhero." However, DC and Marvel quickly discovered that they could only register marks involving the phrase "superhero" if the phrase referenced their own company or a character associated with their company. As a result, DC and Marvel decided to become joint owners of the "superhero" trademark.

Although joint ownership in a trademark is uncommon, the USPTO will grant joint ownership in a mark. In the case Arrow Trading Co., Inc. v. Victorinox A.G. and Wegner S.A., Opposition No. 103315 (TTAB June 27, 2003), the TTAB held that when "two entities have a long-standing relationship and rely on each other for quality control, it may be found, in appropriate circumstances, that the parties, as joint owners, do represent a single source."

DC and Marvel have continued to expand their commercialization of the "superhero" mark to categories beyond comic books. Now, the two publishers jointly own numerous trademarks for figurines (see Spider-Man, Batman), movies, TV shows, magazines, merchandise, cardboard stand-up figures, playing cards, erasers, pencils, notebooks, cartoons, and many more. For instance, the companies filed a trademark application as joint owners for the mark "SUPER HEROES" for a series of animated motion pictures in 2009 (Reg. No. 5613972). Both DC and Marvel also individually owned trademarks involving the "super hero" mark. Notably, DC owns the mark "Legion of Super-Heroes" for comic magazines and Marvel owns the mark "Marvel Super Hero Island" for story books, fiction books, and children's activity books.

DC and Marvel have become known for aggressively protecting their registered marks. In 2019, the companies pursued a British law student named Graham Jules who was attempting to publish a self-help book titled Business Zero to Superhero. Much academic debate exists about whether the "super hero" mark has become generic and whether DC and Marvel have created a duopoly over the "super hero" mark. Conversely, DC and Marvel hold that they are merely exercising their right and duty to protect their registered marks.

=== Current status/relevant cases ===
The following trademarks were or are registered jointly with MARVEL CHARACTERS, INC. and DC COMICS:

- 73222079 SUPER HEROES for publications (Cancelled)
- 72243225 SUPER HERO for costumes (Cancelled)
- 77732560 SUPER HEROES for production and distribution of a series of animated motion picture
- 78356610 SUPER HEROES for t-shirts (Cancelled)
- 73011796 SUPER HEROES for toy figures (Cancelled)

DC and Marvel have garnered a reputation for zealously protecting their superhero marks. As noted above, one of these instances included a man by the name of Graham Jules, who sought to publish a book entitled Business Zero to Superhero. In 2014, he received a cease and desist from DC and Marvel who claimed that his use of the term superhero would cause confusion and dilute their brands. He was offered a few thousand dollars in settlement to change the name of his book, but he did not concede. A few days prior to the scheduled hearing at the Intellectual Property Office in London, the companies backed down.

A similar scenario occurred when comic book creator Ray Felix attempted to register his comic book series A World Without Superheroes with the USPTO. Felix is one of many who argue that the term "superhero" has become generic (see discussion below). Felix's mark is currently abandoned, but he has stated that he intends to fight against DC and Marvel for use of the term.

In 2024, Superbabies Limited managed to obtain a default judgement and cancel the "super heroes" trademarks as genericized, except for the animation pictures mark. This was unexpected as Marvel and DC had filed a motion to extend time to answer.

Daredevil Battles Hitler (July 1941), the premiere issue of Daredevil Comics; art by Charles Biro and Bob Wood.

=== Ongoing legal debate ===
There is an ongoing debate among legal scholars and in the courts about whether the term "superhero" has become genericized due to its widespread use in popular culture, similar to terms like "aspirin" or "escalator" which lost their trademark protection and became generic terms for their respective products. Some argue the term "SUPER HERO" trademark is at risk of becoming generic.

Courts have noted that determining whether a term has become generic is a highly factual inquiry not suitable for resolution without considering evidence like dictionary definitions, media usage, and consumer surveys. Trademark owners can take steps to prevent genericide, such as using the trademark with the generic product name, educating the public, and policing unauthorized uses. However, misuse by the public alone does not necessarily cause a trademark to become generic if the primary significance of the term is still to indicate a particular source.

Some legal experts argue that, like the once-trademarked terms "aspirin" and "yo-yo," the term "superhero" now primarily refers to a general type of character with extraordinary abilities, rather than characters originating from specific publishers.

=== Superhero names: public domain vs. trademark ===
Even when characters enter the public domain, their names are not always free for use. A notable example is the character Daredevil, originally created by Jack Binder and Jack Cole for Lev Gleason Publications. Although his classic version is in the public domain, Marvel holds the trademark for the name “Daredevil,” associated with its own character introduced in 1964. This prevents third parties from commercially using the name. Under U.S. law at the time, publishers were required to renew their copyrights after 28 years.

== Minority superheroes ==
In keeping with their origins as representing the archetypical hero stock character in 1930s American comics, superheroes are predominantly depicted as White American middle- or upper-class young adult males and females who are typically tall, athletic, educated, physically attractive and in perfect health. Beginning in the 1960s with the civil rights movement in the United States, and increasingly with the rising concern over political correctness in the 1980s, superhero fiction centered on cultural, ethnic, national, racial and language minority groups (from the perspective of US demographics) began to be produced. This began with depiction of black superheroes in the 1960s, followed in the 1970s with a number of other ethnic-minority superheroes. In keeping with the political mood of the time, cultural diversity and inclusivism would be an important part of superhero groups starting from the 1980s. In the 1990s, this was further augmented by the first depictions of superheroes as homosexual. In 2017, Sign Gene emerged, the first group of deaf superheroes with superpowers through the use of sign language.

=== Female superheroines and villains ===
Female super heroines—and villains—have been around since the early years of comic books dating back to the 1940s. The representation of women in comic books has been questioned in the past decade following the rise of comic book characters in the film industry (Marvel/DC movies). Women are presented differently than their male counterparts, typically wearing revealing clothing that showcases their curves and cleavage and showing a lot of skin in some cases. Heroes like Power Girl and Wonder Woman are portrayed wearing little clothing and showing cleavage. Power Girl is portrayed as wearing a suit not unlike the swimsuits in the TV series Baywatch. The sexualization of women in comic books can be explained mainly by the fact that the majority of writers are male. Not only are the writers mostly male, but the audience is mostly male as well. Therefore, writers are designing characters to appeal to a mostly male audience. The super hero characters illustrate a sociological idea called the "male gaze" which is media created from the viewpoint of a normative heterosexual male. The female characters in comic books are used to satisfy male desire for the "ideal" woman (small waist, large breasts, toned, athletic body). These characters have god-like power, but the most easily identifiable feature is their hyper sexualized bodies: they are designed to be sexually pleasing to the hypothetical heteronormative male audience.

Villains, such as Harley Quinn and Poison Ivy, use their sexuality to take advantage of their male victims. In the film versions of these characters, their sexuality and seductive methods are highlighted. Poison Ivy uses seduction through poison to take over the minds of her victims as seen in the 1997 film Batman & Robin. Harley Quinn in 2016's Suicide Squad uses her sexuality to her advantage, acting in a promiscuous manner.

Through the overdeveloped bodies of the heroes or the seductive mannerisms of the villains, women in comic books are used as subordinates to their male counterparts, regardless of their strength or power. Wonder Woman has been subject to a long history of suppression as a result of her strength and power, including American culture's undoing of the Lynda Carter television series. In 2017's Wonder Woman, she had the power of a god, but was still drawn to a much weaker, mortal male character. This can be explained by the sociological concept "feminine apologetic," which reinforces a woman's femininity to account for her masculine attributes (strength, individualism, toughness, aggressiveness, bravery). Women in comic books are considered to be misrepresented due to being created by men, for men.

The Hawkeye Initiative is a website satirizing the sexualized portrayal of women in comics by recreating the same poses using male superheroes, especially Marvel's Hawkeye.

=== Ethnic and religious minorities ===
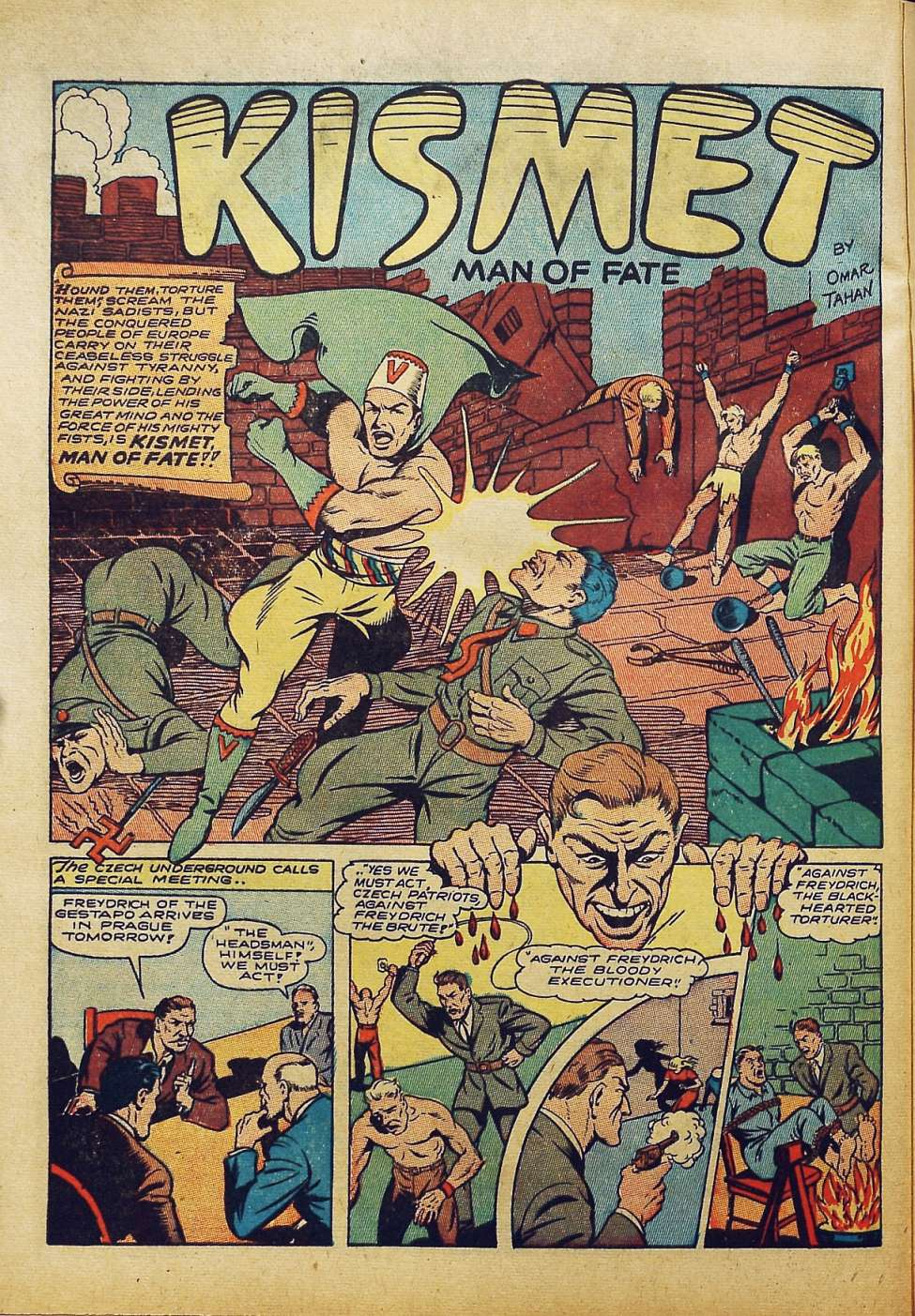
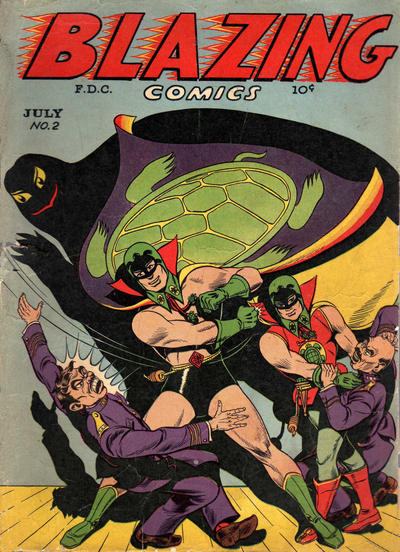

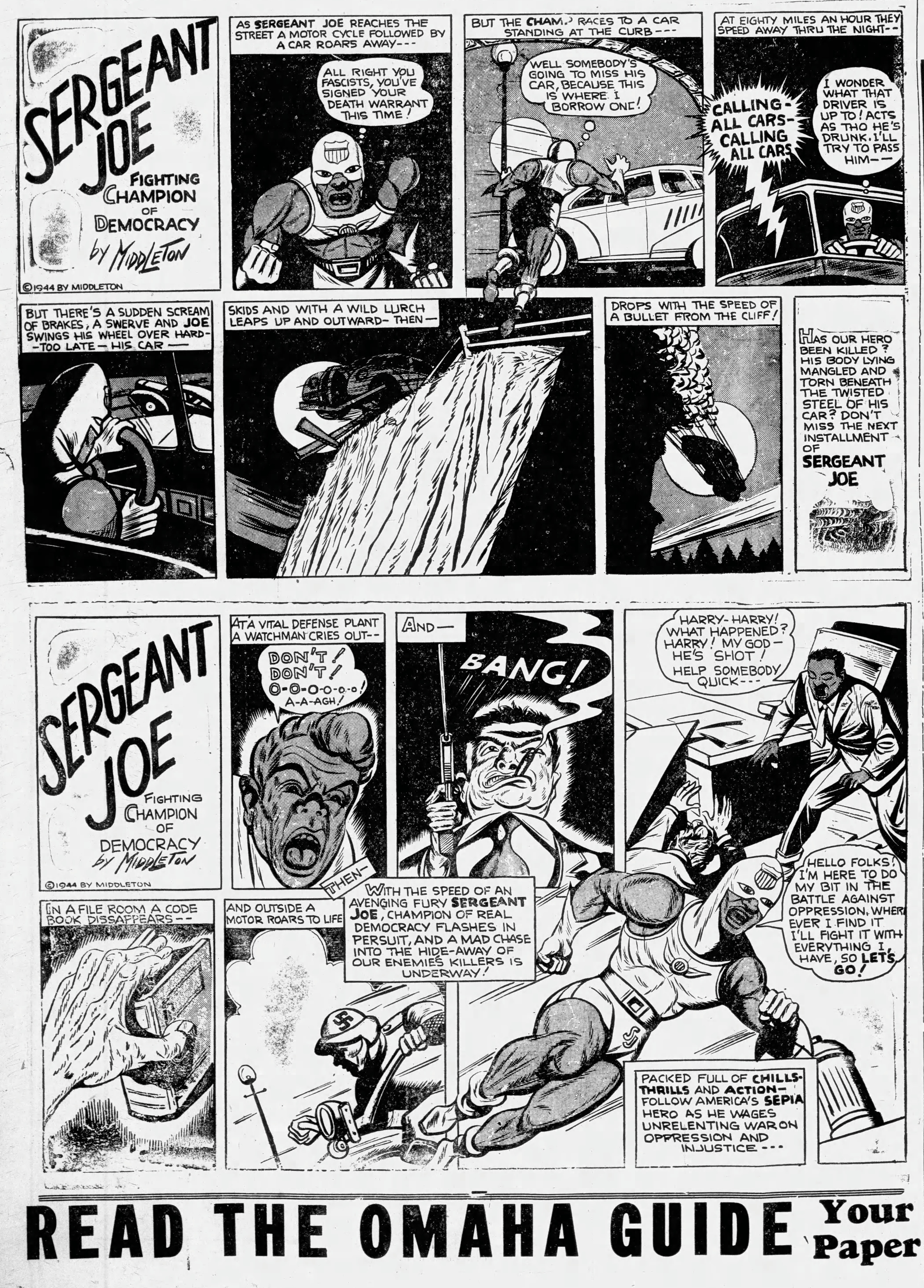
Sergeant Joe: Fighting Champion of Democracy, by Owen Middleton

Kismet, the Green Turtle and Sergeant Joe: early attempts at ethnically diverse superheroes, both fought in World War II, representing underrepresented identities in the Golden Age of Comics.

In 1966, Marvel introduced the Black Panther, an African monarch who became the first non-caricatured black superhero. The first African-American superhero, the Falcon, followed in 1969, and three years later, Luke Cage, a self-styled "hero-for-hire", became the first black superhero to star in his own series. In 1989, the Monica Rambeau incarnation of Captain Marvel was the first female black superhero from a major publisher to get her own title in a special one-shot issue. Before them, a few characters appeared during the Golden Age of Comics, but they are not generally considered superheroes in the modern sense, such as the characters featured in the one-shot All-Negro Comics #1 (1947), Waku, Prince of the Bantu, introduced by Marvel's 1950s predecessor Atlas Comics, who starred in his own feature in the anthology series Jungle Tales. and Kismet, Man of Fate, a Muslim Algerian hero who debuted in 1944 and is considered one of the first Muslim superheroes in comic book history. In 1944, Owen Middleton created Sergeant Joe: Fighting Champion of Democracy, a superhero-themed strip with a U.S. military motif. In 1971, Red Wolf became the first Native American in the superheroic tradition to headline a series. In 1973, Shang-Chi became the first prominent Asian superhero to star in an American comic book. Kato, from the Green Hornet franchise, had existed as a secondary character since the 1930s. The Green Turtle, created in 1944 by Chinese-American artist Chu F. Hing, was originally conceived as a Chinese hero fighting against the Japanese invasion. However, Hing was prevented by his editors from making the character explicitly Chinese, so he deliberately left the hero's identity ambiguous.

In Nigeria, the comic series Powerman was published in 1975 by Bardon Press Features of London as an educational tool. The series, starring Powerman, was written by Don Avenall (aka Donne Avenell) and Norman Worker, and illustrated by Dave Gibbons and Brian Bolland.

Kitty Pryde, a member of the X-Men, was an openly Jewish superhero in mainstream American comic books as early as 1978.

Comic-book companies were in the early stages of cultural expansion and many of these characters played to specific stereotypes; Cage and many of his contemporaries often employed lingo similar to that of blaxploitation films, Native Americans were often associated with shamanism and wild animals, and Asian Americans were often portrayed as kung fu martial artists. Subsequent minority heroes, such as the X-Men's Storm and the Teen Titans' Cyborg avoided such conventions; they were both part of ensemble teams, which became increasingly diverse in subsequent years. The X-Men, in particular, were revived in 1975 with a line-up of characters drawn from several nations, including the Kenyan Storm, German Nightcrawler, Soviet/Russian Colossus, Irish Banshee, and Japanese Sunfire. In 1993, Milestone Comics, an African-American-owned media/publishing company entered into a publishing agreement with DC Comics that allowed them to introduce a line of comics that included characters of many ethnic minorities. Milestone's initial run lasted four years, during which it introduced Static, a character adapted into the WB Network animated series Static Shock.

In addition to the creation of new minority heroes, publishers have filled the identities and roles of once-Caucasian heroes with new characters from minority backgrounds. The African-American John Stewart appeared in the 1970s as an alternate for Earth's Green Lantern Hal Jordan, and would become a regular member of the Green Lantern Corps from the 1980s onward. The creators of the 2000s-era Justice League animated series selected Stewart as the show's Green Lantern. In the Ultimate Marvel universe, Miles Morales, a youth of Puerto Rican and African-American ancestry who was also bitten by a genetically altered spider, debuted as the new Spider-Man after the apparent death of the original Spider-Man, Peter Parker. Kamala Khan, a Pakistani-American Muslim teenager who is revealed to have Inhuman lineage after her shapeshifting powers manifested, takes on the identity of Ms. Marvel in 2014 after Carol Danvers had become Captain Marvel. Her self-titled comic book series became a cultural phenomenon, with extensive media coverage by CNN, the New York Times and The Colbert Report, and embraced by anti-Islamophobia campaigners in San Francisco who plastered over anti-Muslim bus adverts with Kamala stickers. Other such successor-heroes of color include James "Rhodey" Rhodes as Iron Man and to a lesser extent Riri "Ironheart" Williams, Ryan Choi as the Atom, Jaime Reyes as Blue Beetle and Amadeus Cho as Hulk.

Certain established characters have had their ethnicity changed when adapted to another continuity or media. A notable example is Nick Fury, who is reinterpreted as African-American both in the Ultimate Marvel as well as the Marvel Cinematic Universe continuities.

=== Sexual orientation and gender identity ===
In 1992, Marvel revealed that Northstar, a member of the Canadian mutant superhero team Alpha Flight, was homosexual, after years of implication. This ended a long-standing editorial mandate that there would be no homosexual characters in Marvel comics. Although some minor secondary characters in DC Comics' mature-audience 1980s miniseries Watchmen were gay, and the reformed supervillain Pied Piper came out to Wally West in an issue of The Flash in 1991, Northstar is considered to be the first openly gay superhero appearing in mainstream comic books. From the mid-2000s onward, several established Marvel and DC comics characters (or a variant version of the pre-existing character) were outed or reintroduced as LGBT individuals by both publishers. Examples include the Mikaal Tomas incarnation of Starman in 1998; Colossus in the Ultimate X-Men series; Renee Montoya in DC's Gotham Central series in 2003; the Kate Kane incarnation of Batwoman in 2006; Rictor and Shatterstar in an issue of X-Factor in 2009; the Golden Age Green Lantern Alan Scott is reimagined as openly gay following The New 52 reboot in 2011; and in 2015, a younger time displaced version of Iceman in an issue of All-New X-Men.

Many new openly gay, lesbian and bisexual characters have since emerged in superhero fiction, such as Gen^{13}'s Rainmaker, Apollo and Midnighter of The Authority, and Wiccan and Hulkling of the Young Avengers. Notable transgender or gender bending characters are fewer in number by comparison: the alter ego of superheroine Zsazsa Zaturnnah, a seminal character in Philippine popular culture, is an effeminate gay man who transforms into a female superhuman after ingesting a magical stone. Desire from Neil Gaiman's The Sandman series, Cloud from Defenders, and Xavin from the Runaways are all characters who could (and often) change their gender at will. Alysia Yeoh, a supporting character created by writer Gail Simone for the Batgirl ongoing series published by DC Comics, received substantial media attention in 2011 for being the first major transgender character written in a contemporary context in a mainstream American comic book.

The Sailor Moon series is known for featuring a substantial number of openly LGBT characters since its inception, as Japan have traditionally been more open about portraying homosexuality in its children's media compared to many countries in the West. Certain characters who are presented as homosexual or transgender in one continuity may not be presented as such in others, particularly with dubbed versions made for international release.

An animated short The Ambiguously Gay Duo parodies comic book superheroes and features Ace and Gary (Stephen Colbert, Steve Carell). It originated on The Dana Carvey Show and then moved to Saturday Night Live.

=== Language minority ===
In 2017, Pluin introduced Sign Gene, a film featuring a group of deaf superheroes whose powers derive from their use of sign language. The film was produced by and with deaf people and deals with Deaf culture, history and language.

== Subtypes ==
- List of metahumans in DC Comics

== See also ==
- Category:Parody superheroes
- Category:Superhero crossover fiction
- Hero
- Local hero (Japan)
- Real-life superhero
- List of comic book and superhero podcasts
- List of superhero debuts
- List of superhero films
- List of superhero teams and groups
- List of superhero television series
- List of American superhero films
- List of Indian superhero films
- List of Latino superheroes
