= American Negro Exposition =

1940 World's Fair–style event in Chicago

1940 Chicago
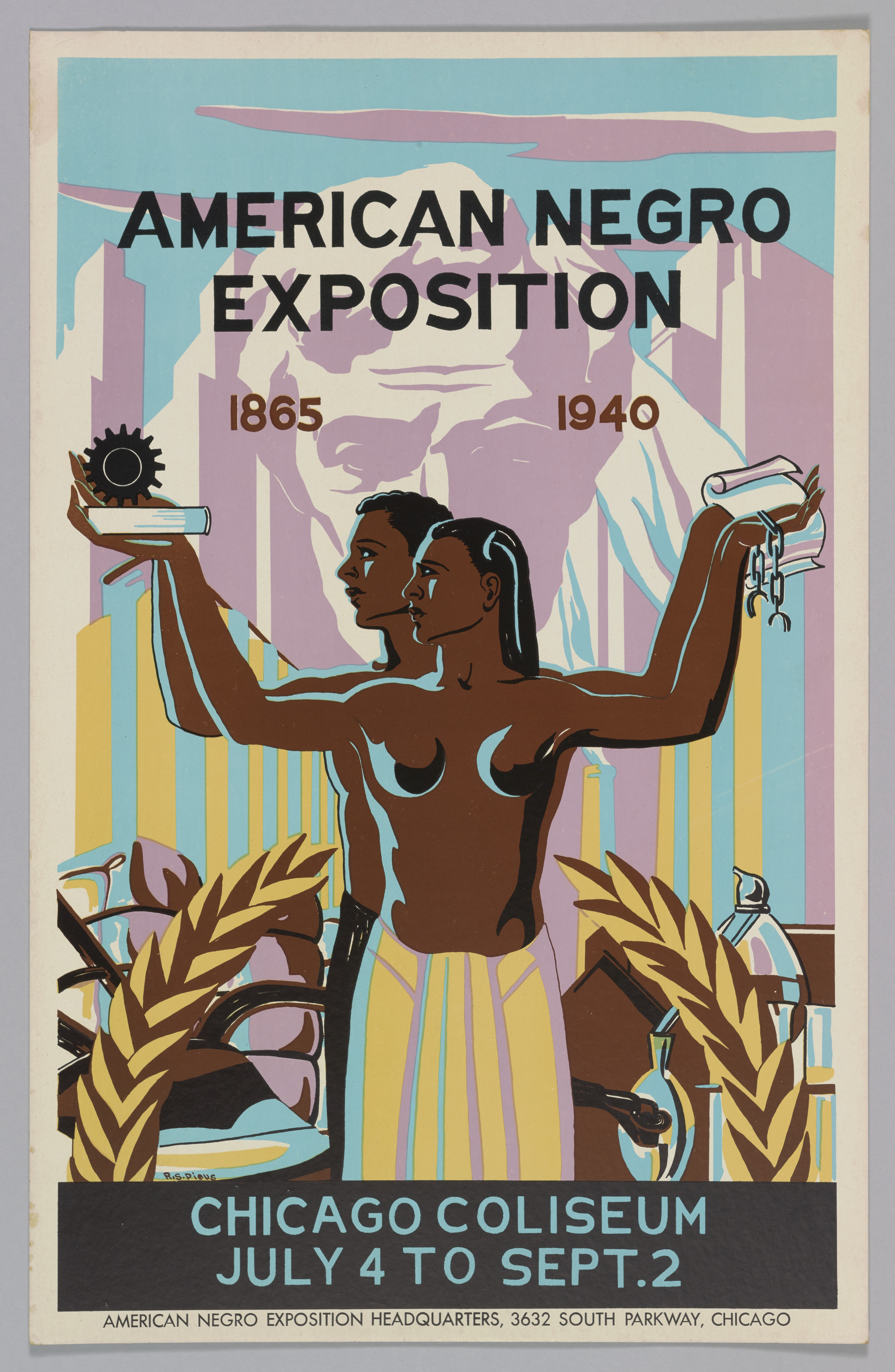
- Promotional poster by Robert Pious

Overview
- BIE-class: Unrecognized exposition
- Name: American Negro Exposition
- Building(s): Chicago Coliseum
- Visitors: 250,000

Participant(s)
- Organizations: 27
- Business: 10

Location
- Country: United States
- City: Chicago
- Venue: 1513 South Wabash Avenue, South Loop

Timeline
- Opening: July 4, 1940
- Closure: September 2, 1940

Specialized expositions

The American Negro Exposition, also known as the Black World's Fair and the Diamond Jubilee Exposition, was a world's fair held in Chicago from July until September in 1940, to celebrate the 75th anniversary (also known as a diamond jubilee) of the end of slavery in the United States at the conclusion of the Civil War in 1865.

== History ==
As a result of the discrimination towards African Americans at the 1933 Century of Progress Exposition, James Washington, a real estate developer, conceived of the American Negro Exposition.

On July 4, 1940, President Franklin Delano Roosevelt, from his Hyde Park home, pressed a button to turn on the lights, officially opening the American Negro Exposition. The main speakers on the opening day were Chicago mayor Edward Joseph Kelly as well as Postmaster General James A. Farley. The exposition was held at the Chicago Coliseum, with 120 exhibits on display. The exposition was organized by James W. Washington, as president, and was funded through two $75,000 ($1.37 million in 2020) grants from Congress and the Illinois General Assembly. Truman Gibson, a member of Roosevelt's "Black Cabinet", served as executive director for the fair.

== Exhibits ==
Entrance was 25 cents and the organizers expected 2 million people to attend. The art exhibit, which was curated by Alonzo J. Aden, comprised 300 paintings and drawings and was called by The New York Times as "the largest showing of the work of Negro artists ever assembled."

The exposition is dominated by a replica of the Lincoln Tomb and Monument in Springfield, Ill. Exhibits include representation from most of the Federal departments and agencies, the city, the Board of Education and the Republic of Liberia. One section features the work of Negro authors...Almost every day until closing time on Labor Day, Sept. 2, has been set aside to honor some State, organization, or Negro.

— The New York Times

Additionally, there was a Hall of Fame honoring notable African Americans. Artist William Edouard Scott created a series of 24 murals for the event, which took him three months to complete. Black Mexican artist Elizabeth Catlett's master thesis, the limestone sculpture "Negro Mother and Child" won first place in the exposition.

Margaret Walker entered a literary competition with the following verses:

Come now my brothers and citizens of America

and hear the strange singing of me, your brother,
and see the strange dancing of me, your daughter,
and know that I am you and you are me
and the two are as one in danger and in peace,
in plenty and in poverty,
in freedom forever,
in power, and glory and triumph.
I ask you, America,
is this not signing witness in your soul?
Who are you to deny me the right
to cast my vote in the streets of America
in the Senate halls of America?
Who are you to deny the right to speak?
I who am myself also America.
I who cleared your forests
and laid your thoroughfares.
Who are you to be presumptuous
to tell me where to ride,
and where to stand,
and where to sit?
Who are you to lynch the flesh of your flesh?
Who are you to say who shall live
and who shall die?
Who are you to tell me where to eat
and where to sleep?

Who are you America but Me?

— Margaret Walker

Arna Bontemps and Langston Hughes co-wrote a musical titled Jubilee: Cavalcade of the Negro Theater specifically for the exposition. Bontemps, the poet Fenton Johnson, and several others working under the auspices of the Illinois Writers' Project, produced a commemorative 96-page African-American history book called Cavalcade of the American Negro.

Other musical segments were a performance by Duke Ellington and his orchestra, as well as a swing performance of The Chimes of Normandy.

== Participants ==
=== Organizations ===
- United States Department of Agriculture
- United States Department of Labor
- United States Public Health Department
- United States Post Office Department
- Civilian Conservation Corps
- Federal Works Agency
- National Youth Administration
- Social Security Administration
- State of West Virginia
- City of Chicago
- Chicago Public Schools
- Peoria, Illinois
- Terre Haute, Indiana
- Catholic Church
- National Tuberculosis Association
- Hampton Institute
- Fisk University
- Tuskegee Institute
- Howard University
- Association for Study of Negro Life and History
- Associated Negro Press
- 230 "Negro Newspapers"
- Freemasons
- The Elks
- Federated Women's Club

=== Businesses ===
- Firestone Rubber Co.-funded the Liberia exhibit.
- Columbia Recording Company
- National Negro Insurance Association
- Liberty Life Insurance Co.
- Chrysler Corp.
- Boyd Baptist
- United Tax-Cab Co.
- Consolidated Edison
- Pepsi-Cola
- Goldenrod Records

== Dioramas ==
The exhibit had 33 five-feet wide dioramas held in the "Court of Dioramas" hall, they were made from wood, plaster and masonite, showcasing African-American contributions and events of historical significance, ranging from ancient Egypt through World War I. Commercial artist Charles C. Dawson directed the creation of the dioramas. The temporary exhibit was only on display for the roughly two months the exhibition ran and inspired local teachers in improving teaching African-American history.

A list of the dioramas in the names at the time of showing, included:

1. City of Kharnak, Building Temple.
2. Building the Sphynix
3. Ethiopians Discovering the First Wheel
4. Africans Smelting
5. Slave Trade in Africa
6. First Slaves in Virginia
7. Pietro Alonzo, Pilot of the Santa Maria
8. Estevanico in Arizona, 1532
9. Crispus Attucks, First Martyrs
10. Large Cotton Plantation, Slavery Period
11. Matt Henson at the North Pole
12. Drawing Water for Irrigation
13. The 10th Cavalry at San Juan Hill (1898)
14. Georgia Slaves Defending Plantation Against British Soldiers (1779). This event was related to Lachlan McGillivray.
15. Isaac Murphy, King of Jockeys
16. World War: I
17. Boy Scouts
18. Gold Rush
19. Modern Building; Port Au Prince
20. Beginning of Negro Business
21. Construction of the First White House. This was related to Thomas Jefferson and Benjamin Banneker.
22. Reconstruction
23. In the House of the Master
24. Broken Bonds
25. In the House of the Mother
26. In the House of the Father
27. In the City of Destruction
28. In the City of Rebirth
29. Baptism of Ethiopians
30. Esquire Cartoon. This was related to E. Simms Campbell.
31. Philip and the Ethiopians
32. The Warm Springs Negro School
33. New Negro School

Of the original 33 dioramas, 13 were lost, and Tuskegee University, through Dawson, an alumni who was started teaching at the institution, acquired the remaining 20 dioramas from the State of Illinois. They were placed at the University's former George Washington Carver Museum, then moved to the main library. Due to their state of disrepair, they had arrived at Tuskegee at "60% destroyed", they were stored away from public view for decades.

External video
- You may view the CBS Sunday Morning story on YouTube

Tuskegee's Legacy Museum set up a new exhibit, 20 Dioramas: Brightly-Lit Windows, Magically Different, using the 20 dioramas to "demonstrate the rich past of African-Americans". The museum curator, Dr. Jontyle Robinson, used the conservation work to "improve diversity in the field of conservation", since "[o]nly 1 to 2% of conservators are African American." Restoring a single diorama costs between $25,000 to $30,000 in 2018.

CBS Sunday Morning correspondent Rita Braver did a story on the dioramas, with the intention of bringing awareness and hope that the segment would help in unearthing the lost 13.

List of Restored Dioramas
Year of restoration	Title	Restored by	Notes
2018	"Benjamin Banneker and the Surveying of Washington, D.C."	Texas Southern University	
2018	"The Arrival of the Slaves at Jamestown, Virginia"	Texas Southern University	
2019	"Crispus Attucks, The First American Martyr, 1770"	University of Delaware and Winterthur Museum	
2019	"Negro Businesses"	Fisk University	
2019	"Matthew Henson, Discovery of the North Pole"	Smithsonian Institution	
2020	"Harlem Hellfighters in World War I"	University of Delaware and Winterthur Museum	

== Legacy ==
In 2015, the African American Cultural Center of the University of Illinois at Chicago curated an exhibition of the Exposition "showcas[ing]...objects, images and texts from the landmark...Exposition."

== See also ==
- Lincoln Jubilee, the 50th anniversary exposition in 1915, also held at the Chicago Coliseum.
- The Exhibit of American Negroes-sociological display within the Palace of Social Economy at the 1900 World's Fair in Paris.
