= Fantomah =

American comic book superheroine

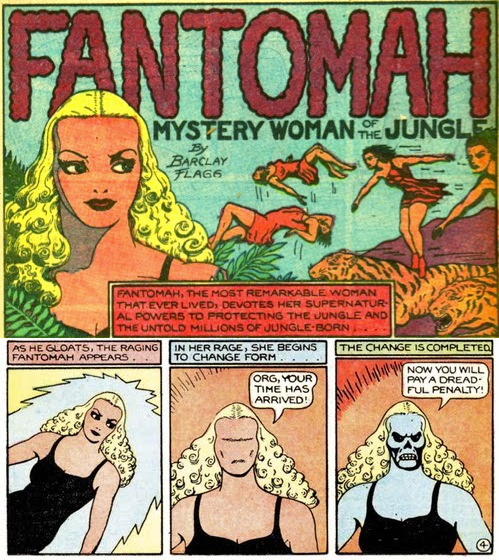
- Fantomah transforming. From Jungle Comics #15 (March 1941), art by Fletcher Hanks.

Publication information
- Publisher: Fiction House
- First appearance: Jungle Comics #2 (Feb. 1940)
- Created by: Fletcher Hanks (as "Barclay Flagg")

In-story information
- Abilities: Superstrength, flight, other unspecified powers

Fantomah is an American comics character, best known as one of the earliest comic book superheroines. Created by Fletcher Hanks, the character first appeared in Jungle Comics #2 (cover-dated Feb. 1940), published by Fiction House. Hanks is also known for creating the equally strange Stardust the Super Wizard.

The character preceded Wonder Woman's first appearance, and has been claimed to be the first female superhero in comic books (although the Centaur Comics superheroine, "Magician from Mars", predates Fantomah by two months). But L'Oiselle is noted as the first female superhero overall with debut of 1909 (well before Superhero comics).

One comics historian says: "Simultaneously grotesque and goofy, horrific and hilarious, the strip truly defies description".

== Publication history ==
Fantomah, "Mystery Woman of the Jungle", is a female comic-book superhero created by writer-artist Fletcher Hanks, under the pseudonym Barclay Flagg. She debuted in a namesake backup feature in Jungle Comics #2 (Feb. 1940), and continued as a backup feature until her final appearance in issue #51 (March 1944). Beginning with issue #16 (April 1941), Hanks was succeeded by an unknown writer under the pseudonym H.B Hovious, with art tentatively credited to Robert Pious. This version of Fantomah abandoned the trappings of a superheroine and was portrayed as a typical jungle girl.

According to Jess Nevins' Encyclopedia of Golden Age Superheroes, Fantomah "fights against ivory hunters, an array of mad scientists and alien dinosaurs, a man turned into a jungle demon, the Tiger-Woman of Wildmoon Mountain, cavemen, a mummy scientist, and German fifth columnists".

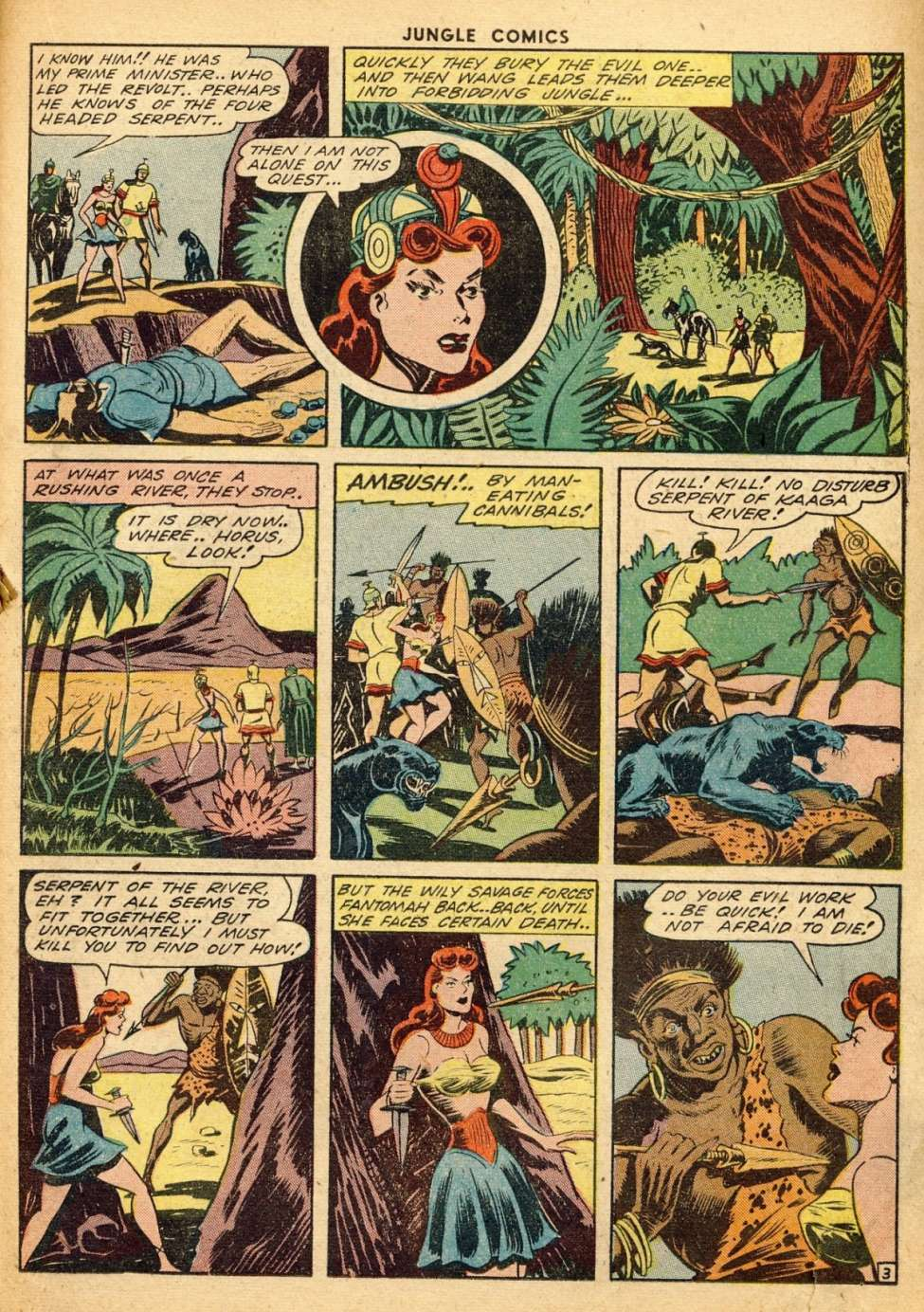
Jungle Comics #51, March 1944, art by George Appel

The third stage of Fantomah's career began in Jungle Comics #27 (March 1942) when Hovious and artist George Appel retconned her into an ancient Egyptian princess, revived to protect the jungle. At that point, she dropped the "Mystery Woman of the Jungle" subtitle, and became "Fantomah, Daughter of the Pharaohs".

Fiction House reprinted two stories in Ka'a'nga Comics featuring another jungle girl, Camilla, re-writing the stories and changing the lead character's name to "Fantomah".

Later, A.C.E. Comics' Fantastic Adventures #1 (July 1987) and AC Comics' Golden Age Greats #14 (March 1999) and Men of Mystery Comics #85 (April 2011) reprinted early Fantomah stories.

Being in the public domain, Fantomah has been used by various modern publications, including appearances in Devil's Due Publishing's Hack/Slash: The Series #29–32 (Dec. 2009 – March 2010), and in issue #5 (June 2011) of the sequel series, titled simply Hack/Slash.

In 2017, Canadian comic book publishing company Chapterhouse created a new series by Ray Fawkes and Soo Lee with a different premise.

== Fictional character biography ==
The original Fantomah is a mysterious woman who protects the jungle with her many supernatural powers. She loved her jungle and its people and animals, and would often inflict cruel punishment on anyone who threatened any of them. When Fantomah uses her powers, her normally beautiful face turns into a blue skull (though her curly blonde hair remains unchanged).

== Powers and abilities ==
The original Fantomah exhibited a large number of magical abilities, generally as required by the story's plot. Among others, she demonstrated the ability to fly, transform objects into different objects, levitate other objects, cause humans to mutate into other forms, and so on. Generally, whenever Fantomah used her powers, she would change her face from a normal human woman to a blue-skinned skull-like visage.

== In other media ==
=== TV series ===
By 2023, a live-action Fantomah TV series is in the works. The project is a collaboration between Lev Gleason Studios and Campanario Entertainment.
