= Magician from Mars =

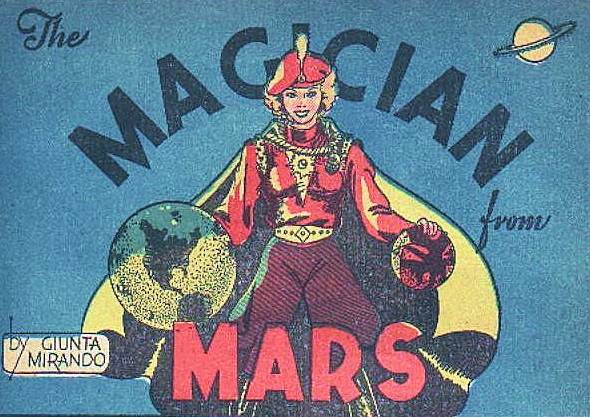
- From Amazing-Man Comics #11 (April 1940), art by John Giunta and Michael Mirando.

Publication information
- Publisher: Centaur Publications
- First appearance: Amazing-Man Comics #7 (November 1939)
- Created by: John Giunta; Malcolm Kildale

In-story information
- Alter ego: Jane 6ᴇᴍ35 / Jane Q-X3

The Magician from Mars was a Golden Age superheroine created by John Giunta and Malcolm Kildale for Centaur Publications' Amazing-Man Comics. who appeared in five issues of Amazing-Man Comics (#7–11, Nov 1939 – Apr 1940), thereby predating most other early comics superheroines (such as Fantomah and Wonder Woman).

== Fictional biography ==
The Magician's real name was given as "Jane 6ᴇᴍ35" in the first installment (though the second changes her surname to "Q-X3"). She is born on Mars at some unspecified date in the future at which interplanetary travel is commonplace, to an Earth mother and Martian father. Her superpowers are the result of accidental exposure to cathode rays as an infant, which have a unique effect on her due to her hybrid heritage. These powers are apparently based on the ability to utilize 100% of her brain; they are somewhat vaguely delimited, but include telekinesis, super-strength, gravity nullification, the ability to cast illusions and transform matter, and immortality. Jane / the Magician is also an accomplished pilot, and almost every installment sees her flying an airplane or rocketship.

The only person aware of Jane's unique talents is her mother, who raises her on Mars. After the deaths of both her parents by the age of sixteen, guardianship is assumed by Jane's aunt Kanza, who dislikes her and eventually confines her to a cell. Jane uses her powers to escape and board a spaceship heading to Earth; after the ship is struck by a meteor, she takes advantage of the confusion to steal three million dollars in gold before absconding in an escape pod. Landing on Earth, she donates half of the money to a doctor trying to cure childhood paralysis and keeps the other half to fund her new superhero career. The strip's final two installments saw the Magician fighting an anonymous villainous mastermind, the Hood, who first tried to conquer the Earth and then launched a war against the king of Mars. The Magician traveled to Mars and saved the kingdom, but at the cost of the life of Martian prince Taal, her love interest; she also discovered the Hood was actually her aunt Kanza, who is without explanation shown to possess powers similar to her own.
