= Cavalcade of the American Negro =

African-American book and artworks created 1940

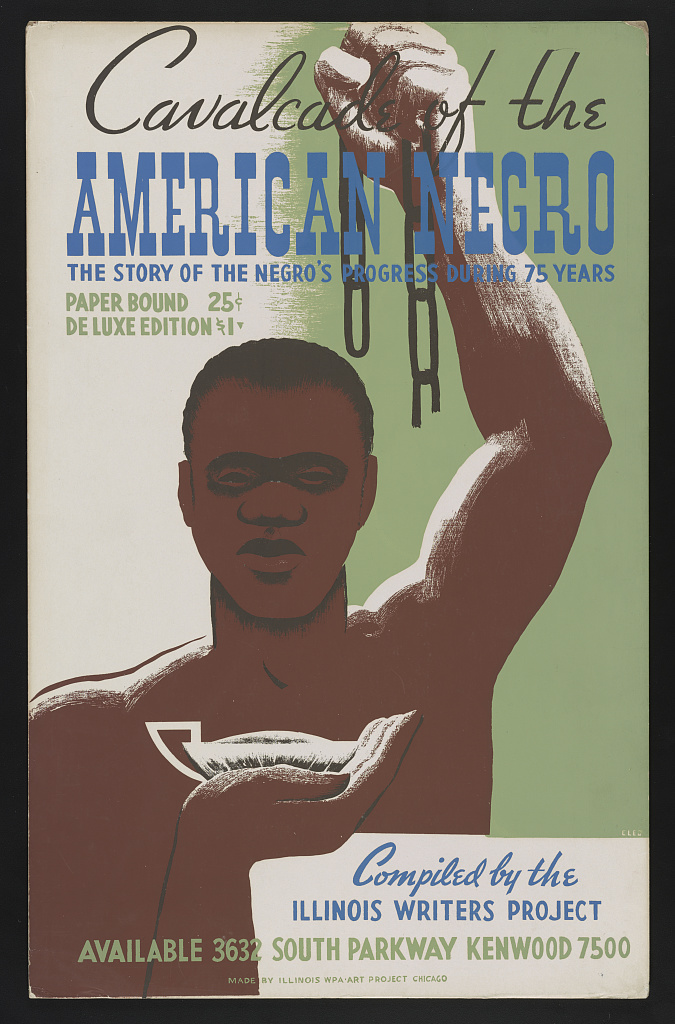
Cavalcade of the American Negro advertisement poster

Cavalcade of the American Negro is a grouping of related artworks collaboratively created by employees of the WPA-funded Illinois Writers' Project and the Federal Art Project for the 1940 American Negro Exposition, a world's fair-style event celebrating the 75th anniversary of the Emancipation of enslaved people in the United States.

== Book ==
There were several African-American ethnographies produced and published by the state-level and city-level projects during the New Deal’s Federal One creative arts programs. A retrospective review of the literary output of the Federal Writers' Project said the 96-page Cavalcade of the American Negro: The Story of the Negro's Progress Over Seventy-Five Years was "probably, despite a number of factual errors, the best of the [Project's] early ethnic studies." Others believe that The Negro in Virginia (1940), supervised by Roscoe E. Lewis, is a more substantial work.

The Cavalcade book, which drew, in part, upon some of the Slave Narratives material that was later published under the title Lay My Burden Down, had a print run of (and may have sold) 50,000 copies. Two editions were printed, a paperback priced at $0.25 and a "deluxe" clothbound hardback priced at $1. Cavalcade was the only title in the 1941 Illinois FWP catalog with more than one edition.

Although unsigned, the work is generally agreed to have been written by Illinois Writers' Project employee Arna Bontemps, who is credited in the foreword as "editor of this work," and his assistants, Henry Bacon, Alvin Cannon, Herman Clayton, Fenton Johnson, Edward Joseph, and George D. Lewis. Johnson most likely wrote the chapters on African-American theater and poetry. The booklet is described as having been "hastily concocted" between March and the Exposition opening in July.

The National Urban League magazine Opportunity described the content as "A history recounting the heroic exploits of the Negro as soldier and sailor in defense of this country…[that] gives a picture of the Negro's participation in the economic, civil and cultural growth of the nation." Later critics described this as the "contributions approach" to retelling African-American history, which was opposed to the "social problems approach."

The Negro in Illinois: The WPA Papers (2013), quoting from an internal memo, reported that poet and professor Sterling Brown, who served as the Director of Negro Affairs for the Federal Writers Project was "disappointed" with the book. While commending the "fluency" he credited to Bontemps, he overall found the work "cautious" with "nothing to disturb the white or Negro reading publics." The contributions approach to African-American history, mentioned above, "sought to win higher regard for African Americans by stressing individual accomplishment in a manner that separated individuals from the group, ignored black cultural life, and implied that the standards of the dominant group were the only measurements of achievement."

Bontemps and Jack Conroy repurposed some of the material they had gathered for Cavalcade of the American Negro in their 1945 book They Seek a City, about the ongoing Great Migration.

== Stage and radio play ==
Bontemps and Langston Hughes collaborated on a stage play that was to be presented at the Exposition, called Jubilee! Cavalcade of the Negro Theater. It was a revue of the history of the African-American stage, from The Octoroon (1859) to the "birth of the Blues." According to the catalog of the New Deal archive at the University of Kentucky, "Hughes noted that it was written for the American Negro Exposition, Chicago, but never produced."

A typescript copy marked "Arna" sold at auction for $12,500 in March 2022. According to Swann Galleries, which listed the item, the script "was later reworked by its two original authors for a 1941 showcase production by CBS Radio. It was then recorded in 1943 by the War Department for broadcast overseas to the troops." Hughes produced several African-American revue projects during his career, of which Cavalcade was but one.

== Book illustrations ==
The souvenir book Cavalcade of the American Negro is illustrated by two woodcut prints by Federal Artists Project employee Adrian Troy (1901–1977). The cover design appears to be based on a chapter early in the book that reiterates the presence of African-Americans at many essential moments in colonial American history. The title page illustration is a much denser work, depicting African-Americans at work as scientists, clergy, laborers, performers, and athletes (the representative boxer is probably a nod to Negro Exposition sponsor and heavyweight champion Joe Louis). The top and bottom right corners of the image are haunted by what appears to be a slave overseer with a whip and some kind of enforcer with a bat.

Troy was born in England and emigrated to the United States in 1922. He had previously exhibited at a 1938 WPA show in Chicago called "Art for the Public," and later taught woodcut engraving at the School of the Art Institute of Chicago in the 1950s and 1960s. The Smithsonian Institution holds seven other prints by Troy; his work is also in the collections of the Art Institute, the Metropolitan Museum of Art, and the Illinois State Museum.

== Advertisement poster ==
The WPA Poster Division created a poster advertising the book to Chicago residents.

WPA poster art historian Christopher DeNoon called the Cavalcade poster "a powerful image whose elements (upraised fist, broken chain) prefigure the 'Black Power' posters of the late 1960s."

Another WPA art collector suggests the multicultural work of some WPA artists was a political act: "WPA posters offered a glimpse into American life that counteracted a systematic absence or misrepresentation of people of color in mainstream advertising—a dominant narrative form in our market-focused country."

Cleo Sara Van Buskirk Thornburg (1912–1997) created the image using silkscreen on board. Thornburg, who was credited as Cleo Sara and signed the work as Cleo, has works in the collections of MoMA and the National Gallery of Art. The poster measures 22 in (56 cm) by 14 in (36 cm).

== See also ==
- Chicago Black Renaissance
- South Side Writers Group
- Black Metropolis
