= Sad-Faced Boy =

Sad-faced Boy is a 1937 children's novel by Arna Wendell Bontemps and illustrated by Virginia Lee Burton. It tells the adventures of three rural boys Slumber, his big brother Rags, and Willie Dozier who travel alone from Alabama to visit Harlem in New York. Bontemps's book, although aimed at children, carried a heavy social warning, that life in the industrial north would still carry the challenges of oppression and prejudice of the South.
