= Story of the Negro =

1948 book by Arna Bontemps

- Author: Arna Bontemps
- Illustrator: Raymond Lufkin
- Language: English
- Genre: Nonfiction
- Published: April 26, 1948
- Publisher: Knopf
- Publication place: United States
- Pages: 240
- Awards: Newbery Honor, Jane Addams Children's Book Award
- ISBN: 978-0-394-91690-3
- OCLC: 233402
- Dewey Decimal: 326

Story of the Negro by Arna Bontemps is a children's history book published by Knopf in 1948. It was the first African-American authored book to receive a Newbery Honor.

== Synopsis ==
The non-fiction book starts with a history dating back to 1700 BC, beginning with African civilizations such as the Ghana and Mandingo Empires. The horrors of the Atlantic slave trade are described, together with the causes and conditions of slavery in America, the Haitian Slave Revolt, and the Underground Railroad. Influential black leaders are examined, including Frederick Douglass, Harriet Tubman, and W. E. B. Du Bois. Bontemps said that the book, "consists mainly of things I learned after I left school that I wish I had known much earlier." The book includes a "theme poem" "The Negro Speaks of Rivers" by Langston Hughes.

The book is split into five different sections, The Ship Introduction, Men of the lakes How African civilizations worked, The Crossing The Columbian trade sent Africans to the New World under poor conditions. Slavery was outlawed in 1863, and people were allowed to move freely, often to New York, The bondage About the twentieth century and the struggle to win rights and Making a new world After the Civil rights act was approved, there was still plenty to do to make the world an equal place.

== Publishing history ==
The first edition was illustrated by Raymond Lufkin and published in 1948 by Knopf. Of the first edition Bontemps related "I would have given my eye teeth to know when I was a high school boy in California—the story that my history books barely mentioned(...)I tried to make clear how American slavery came about and what causes lay behind the present attitudes toward Negroes on the part of some people." Bontemps received his second Guggenheim Fellowship, which enabled him to revise and publish the second edition, an enlarged edition, in 1955. Knopf published three more editions, in 1958, 1964, and 1969. Revised editions of the book extend the history through the late 1960s, with the fifth edition including a new chapter on Black Power.

== Newbery Honor ==
Bontemps was the first African American author to be recognized with the Newbery Award, (Note: The Newbery Medal is given to the winner of the Newbery Award for the most distinguished book for children, while Newbery Honor books recognize other worthy books. At the time of The Story of the Negro Newbery Honor books were called runner-ups.) receiving a Newbery honor for Story of the Negro. Bontemps had corresponded with his friend Langston Hughes about his desire to win a Newbery Medal saying, "near misses don't make me happy. I'd like a jackpot, a bull's-eye, or something—sometime". This book fit in the trend at the time of the Newbery going to books which were about America. If not for this topic, a book about African Americans by African Americans might have struggled to receive recognition from the Newbery committee.

== Awards ==
- Newbery Honor (1949)
- Jane Addams Children's Book Award (1956)

== Reception ==
Arthur Spingarn, the president of the NAACP gave a positive response to the book: ""In the past thirty years I think I have owned and read every published history of the Negro. This is by all odds the best written, the most interesting, accurate, and concise work for the general reader.
