= Arna Bontemps =

American writer and librarian (1902–1973)

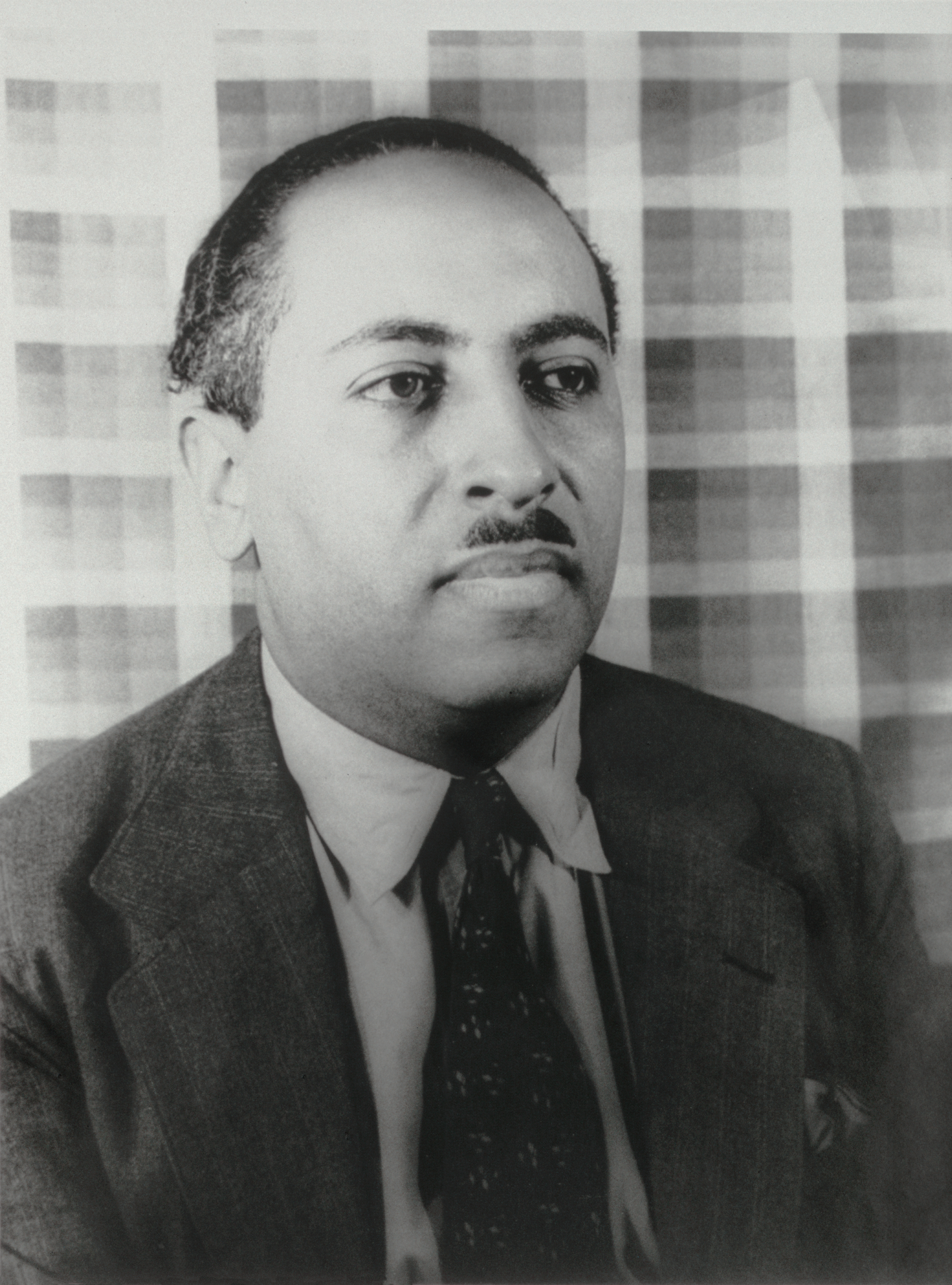
- Arna Bontemps in 1938
- Born: Arna Wendell Bontemps; October 13, 1902; Alexandria, Louisiana, U.S.
- Died: June 4, 1973 (aged 70); Nashville, Tennessee, U.S.
- Education: Pacific Union College
- Occupations: Poet; novelist; librarian
- Spouse: Alberta Johnson (m. 1926)
- Children: 6, with Johnson
- Writing career
- Period: 1924–1973

Arna Wendell Bontemps (/bɒnˈtɒm/ bon-TOM) (October 13, 1902 – June 4, 1973) was an American poet, novelist and librarian, and a noted member of the Harlem Renaissance.

== Early life ==
Bontemps was born in 1902 in Alexandria, Louisiana, into a Louisiana Creole family. His ancestors included free people of color and French colonists. His father was a contractor and sometimes would take his son to construction sites. As the boy got older, his father would take him along to speak-easies at night that featured jazz. His mother, Maria Carolina Pembroke, was a schoolteacher. The family was Catholic, and Bontemps was baptized at St. Francis Xavier Cathedral.

When Bontemps was three years old, his family moved to Los Angeles, California, in the Great Migration of blacks out of the South and into cities of the North, Midwest and West. They settled in what became known as the Watts district. After attending public schools, Bontemps attended Pacific Union College in Angwin, California, where he graduated in 1923. He majored in English and minored in history, and he was also a member of the Omega Psi Phi fraternity.

== Career ==
Following his graduation, Bontemps met and befriended the author Wallace Thurman, founder of Fire!! magazine, in his job at Los Angeles Post Office. Bontemps later traveled to New York City, where he settled and became part of the Harlem Renaissance.

In August 1924, at the age of 22, Bontemps published his first poem, "Hope" (originally called "A Record of the Darker Races"), in The Crisis, official magazine of the National Association for the Advancement of Colored People (NAACP). He depicted hope as an "empty bark" drifting meaninglessly with no purpose, referring to his confusion about his career. Bontemps, along with many other West Coast intellectuals, traveled to New York during the Harlem Renaissance.

After graduation, he moved to New York in 1924 to teach at the Harlem Academy (present-day Northeastern Academy) in New York City. While teaching, Bontemps continued to write and publish poetry. In both 1926 and 1927, he received the Alexander Pushkin Prize of Opportunity, an academic journal published by the National Urban League. In 1926 he won the Crisis Poetry Prize.

In New York, Bontemps met other writers who became lifelong friends, including Countee Cullen, Langston Hughes, W. E. B. Du Bois, Zora Neale Hurston, James Weldon Johnson, Claude McKay and Jean Toomer. Hughes became a role model, collaborator, and dear friend to Bontemps.

In 1926 Bontemps married Alberta Johnson, with whom he had six children. From oldest to youngest they were: Joan (who married Avon Williams), Paul, Poppy, Camille, Connie and Alex. In 1931, he left New York and his teaching position at the Harlem Academy as the Great Depression deepened. He and his family moved to Huntsville, Alabama, where he had a teaching position at Oakwood Junior College for three years.

In the early 1930s, Bontemps began to publish fiction, in addition to more poetry. He received a considerable amount of attention for his first novel, God Sends Sunday (1931). This novel explored the story of an African-American jockey named Little Augie who easily earns money and carelessly squanders it. Little Augie ends up wandering through the black sporting world when his luck as a jockey eventually runs out. Bontemps was praised for his poetic style, his re-creation of the black language, and his distinguishing characters throughout this novel. However, despite the abundant amount of praise, Du Bois viewed it as "sordid" and equated it with other "decadent" novels of the Harlem Renaissance. Later in his career, Bontemps collaborated with Countee Cullen to create a dramatic adaptation of the novel, which was published in 1946 as St. Louis Woman.

Bontemps also began to write several children's books. In 1932, he collaborated with Hughes and wrote Popo and Fifina. This story followed the lives of siblings Popo and Fifina, in an easy to understand introduction to Haitian life for children. Bontemps continued writing children's novels and published You Can't Pet a Possum (1934), which followed a story of a boy and his pet dog living in a rural part of Alabama.

During the early 1930s, African-American writers and intellectuals were discriminated against in Northern Alabama. Thirty miles from Huntsville in Decatur, the Scottsboro boys, nine African Americans, were charged with rape of two white women and being prosecuted in a case that became renowned for racial injustice. During this time, Bontemps had many friends visit and stay with him while they came to Alabama to protest this trial. The school administration was worried about his many out-of-state visitors.

In later years, Bontemps said that the administration at Oakwood Junior College had demanded he burn many of his private books to demonstrate that he had given up radical politics. Bontemps refused to do so. He resigned from his teaching position and returned with his family to California in 1934.

In 1936 Bontemps published what is considered by some as his best work, Black Thunder. This novel explores a slave rebellion that took place in 1800 near Richmond, Virginia, led by Gabriel Prosser, an uneducated, enslaved field worker and coachman. It describes Prosser's attempt to conduct a slave army to raid an armory in Richmond, in order to defend themselves against any assailants. A fellow slave betrayed Prosser, causing the rebellion to be shut down. Prosser was captured by whites and lynched. In Bontemps' version, whites were compelled to admit that slaves were humans who had possibilities of a promising life.

Black Thunder received many extraordinary reviews by both African-American and mainstream journals, for example, the Saturday Review of Literature. Despite these rave reviews, in the midst of the Depression, Bontemps did not earn enough from sales of the novel to support his family in Chicago, where he had moved with them shortly before publishing the book. He briefly taught in Chicago at the Shiloh Academy but did not stay at the school long, leaving for a job with the Illinois Writers' Project (IWP), under the federal Works Progress Administration (WPA).

The Works Progress Administration (WPA) hired writers to produce histories of states and major cities. The Illinois Project was one of the most successful state projects; it employed numerous noted writers. The project work helped them survive economically, and most also worked on their own writing. Bontemps, in addition to other work for the IWP, oversaw such young writers as Richard Wright, Margaret Walker, Katherine Dunham, Fenton Johnson, Frank Yerby, Richard Durham, Kitty Chapelle, and Robert Lucas, in creating the Cavalcade of the American Negro and other works. They created part of what became a massive collection of writings on the "Negro in Illinois".

In 1938, following the publication of his children's book Sad-Faced Boy (1937), Bontemps was granted a Rosenwald fellowship to work on his novel, Drums at Dusk (1939). This was based on Toussaint L'Ouverture's slave rebellion in the French colony of Saint-Domingue (which became the independent republic of Haiti). This book received wider recognition than his other novels. Some critics viewed the plot as overdramatic, while others commended its characterizations.

Bontemps struggled to make enough from his books to support his family. He was dismayed to gain little professional acknowledgement for his work despite being a prolific writer. He became discouraged as an African-American writer of this time. He started to believe that it was futile for him to attempt to address his writing to his own generation, so he chose to focus his serious writing on younger and more progressive audiences. Bontemps met Jack Conroy on the Illinois Writers' Project, and in collaboration they wrote The Fast Sooner Hound (1942). This was a children's story about a hound dog, Sooner, who races and outruns trains. Embarrassed about this, the roadmaster puts him against the fastest train, the Cannon Ball.

Bontemps returned to graduate school and earned a master's degree in library science from the University of Chicago in 1943. He was appointed as head librarian at Fisk University, a historically black college in Nashville, Tennessee. During his time there, he developed important collections and archives of African-American literature and culture, namely the Langston Hughes Renaissance Collection. Bontemps was initiated as a member of the Zeta Rho chapter of Phi Mu Alpha Sinfonia fraternity at Fisk in 1954. He served at Fisk until 1964 and would continue to return occasionally. Bontemps was the first black head librarian, and first black professional librarian, at Fisk.

Bontemps continued breaking barriers at Fisk up to his retirement. In 1957, Bontemps encouraged his assistant, Jessie Carney Smith, to become a librarian. After she earned her Ph.D. in library science, she returned to Fisk in 1965 to replace Bontemps as head librarian, becoming the first black woman to hold that position.

== Later years ==
After retiring from Fisk University in 1966, Bontemps worked at the University of Illinois (Chicago Circle). He later moved to Yale University, where he served as curator of the James Weldon Johnson Collection.

During this time, Bontemps published numerous novels varying in genre. Slappy Hooper (1946), and Sam Patch (1951) were two children's books that he co wrote with Jack Conroy. Individually he published Lonesome Boy (1955) and Mr. Kelso's Lion (1970), two other children's books. Simultaneously he was writing pieces targeted for teenagers, including biographies on George Washington Carver, Frederick Douglass and Booker T. Washington. His other pieces of this time were Golden Slippers (1941), Story of the Negro (1948), Chariot in the Sky (1951) and Famous Negro Athletes (1964). Critics highly praised his Story of the Negro, which received the Jane Addams Children's Book Award and was a Newbery Honor Book.

Bontemps worked with Langston Hughes on pieces geared toward adults. They co-edited The Poetry of the Negro (1949) – described by The New York Times as "a stimulating cross-section of the imaginative writing of the Negro" that demonstrates "talent to the point where one questions the necessity (other than for its social evidence) of the specialization of 'Negro' in the title" – and The Book of Negro Folklore (1958). Bontemps collaborated with Conroy and wrote a history of the migration of African-Americans in the United States called They Seek a City (1945). They later revised and published it as Anyplace But Here (1966). Bontemps also wrote 100 Years of Negro Freedom (1961) and edited Great Slave Narratives (1969) and The Harlem Renaissance Remembered (1972). In addition he was also able to edit American Negro Poetry (1963), which was a popular anthology. He compiled his poetry in Personals (1963) and also wrote an introduction for a previous novel, Black Thunder, when it was republished in 1968.

Bontemps died aged 71 on June 4, 1973, at his home in Nashville, from a myocardial infarction (heart attack), while working on his collection of short fiction in The Old South (1973).

Through his librarianship and bibliographic work, Bontemps became a leading figure in establishing African-American literature as a legitimate object of study and preservation. His work as a poet, novelist, children's writer, editor, librarian and historian helped shape modern African-American literature, but it also had a tremendous influence on African-American culture.

== Legacy and honors ==
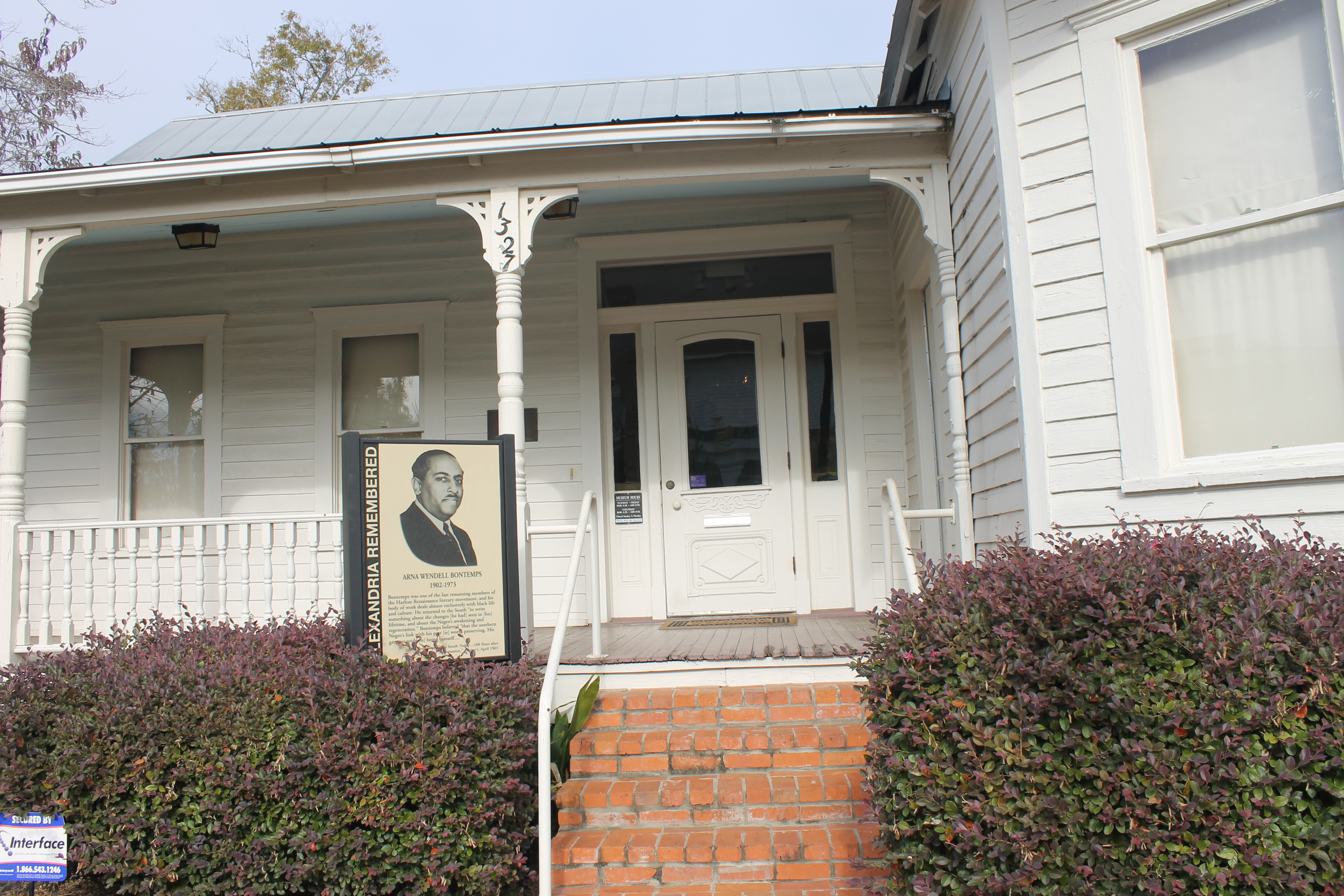
The Arna Bontemps African American Museum is located downtown in his native Alexandria, Louisiana.

- During his life, Bontemps earned two Guggenheim Fellowships.
- In 2002, scholar Molefi Kete Asante included Arna Bontemps on his list of the 100 Greatest African Americans.

== Works ==
- God Sends Sunday: A Novel (New York, Harcourt, Brace and Co., 1931; New York: Washington Square Press, 2005)
- Popo and Fifina, Children of Haiti, by Arna Bontemps and Langston Hughes (New York: Macmillan, 1932; Oxford University Press, 2000)
- You Can't Pet a Possum (New York: William Morrow, 1934)
- Black Thunder: Gabriel's Revolt: Virginia 1800 (New York: Macmillan, 1936; reprinted with intro. Arnold Rampersad, Boston: Beacon Press, 1992)
- Sad-Faced Boy (Boston: Houghton Mifflin, 1937)
- Drums at Dusk: A Novel (New York: Macmillan, 1939; reprinted Baton Rouge, Louisiana: Louisiana State University Press, 2009, ISBN 978-0-8071-3439-9)
- Golden Slippers: an Anthology of Negro Poetry for Young Readers, compiled by Arna Bontemps (New York: Harper & Row, 1941)
- The Fast Sooner Hound, by Arna Bontemps and Jack Conroy (Boston: Houghton Mifflin, 1942)
- They Seek a City (Garden City, New York: Doubleday, Doran and Co., 1945)
- We Have Tomorrow (Boston: Houghton Mifflin, 1945)
- Slappy Hooper, the Wonderful Sign Painter, by Arna Bontemps and Jack Conroy (Boston: Houghton Mifflin, 1946)
- Story of the Negro, (New York: Knopf, 1948; New York: Random House, 1963)
- The Poetry of the Negro, 1746–1949: an anthology, edited by Langston Hughes and Arna Bontemps (Garden City, NY: Doubleday, 1949)
- George Washington Carver (Evanston, IL: Row, Peterson, 1950)
- Father of the Blues: an Autobiography, W. C. Handy, ed. Arna Bontemps (New York: Macmillan, 1941, 1957; Da Capo Press, 1991)
- Chariot in the Sky: a Story of the Jubilee Singers (Philadelphia: Winston, 1951; London: Paul Breman, 1963; Oxford & New York: Oxford University Press, 2002)
- Lonesome Boy (Boston: Houghton Mifflin, 1955; Beacon Press, 1988)
- Famous Negro Athletes (New York: Dodd, Mead and Company, 1964)
- Great Slave Narratives (Boston: Beacon Press, 1969)
- Hold Fast to Dreams: Poems Old and New Selected by Arna Bontemps (Chicago: Follett, 1969)
- Mr. Kelso's Lion (Philadelphia: Lippincott, 1970)
- Free at Last: the Life of Frederick Douglass (New York: Dodd, Mead, 1971; Apollo Editions, 2000)
- The Harlem Renaissance Remembered: Essays, Edited, With a Memoir (New York: Dodd, Mead, 1972, 1984)
- Young Booker: Booker T. Washington's Early Days (New York, Dodd, Mead, 1972)
- The Old South: "A Summer Tragedy" and Other Stories of the Thirties (New York: Dodd, Mead, 1973)

== Recorded works ==
- In the Beginning: Bible Stories for Children by Sholem Asch (Folkways Records, 1955)
- Joseph and His Brothers: From In the Beginning by Sholem Asch (Folkways Records, 1955)
- Anthology of Negro Poets in the U.S.A. - 200 Years (Folkways Records, 1955)
- An Anthology of African American Poetry for Young People (Folkways Records, 1990)

== See also ==
- List of people from Harlem
