= Harlem Academy =

Location
- 655 St. Nicholas Avenue, Harlem, Manhattan, New York City, New York 10030; United States; 40.8228°N 73.9457°W

Information
- Type: Independent school, nonprofit school
- Established: 2004
- Grades: Kindergarten–8
- Gender: Co-education
- Campus size: 0.5 acres
- Campus type: Urban
- Accreditation: New York State Association of Independent Schools (NYSAIS)
- Website: Official website

Harlem Academy is an independent, nonprofit, co-educational K–8 school in Harlem, Manhattan, New York City. Founded in 2004, the school serves students from kindergarten through eighth grade and is accredited by the New York State Association of Independent Schools (NYSAIS).

== Tuition ==
Harlem Academy uses a tuition model based on family financial circumstances. According to the school, tuition is determined using a sliding scale and financial assistance is available. They developed this model in the hope of making school affordable for a variety of families while funding about half of their expenses with tuition. This sliding scale tuition model was originally created by Manhattan Country School.

== Curriculum ==
Harlem Academy serves students in kindergarten through eighth grade and offers subjects including English, mathematics, science, and history.

The mathematics curriculum uses the Math in Focus program, based on Singapore math, while science instruction uses the Full Option Science System (FOSS). Harlem Academy has taken an innovative approach to their curriculum. They became the first school in Manhattan and one of the first in New York to use Singapore Mathematics in the core curriculum. The change produced double digit grown in students' quantitative reasoning.

== Campus ==
Harlem Academy's campus is located on St. Nicholas Avenue in Harlem, Manhattan. At the time of the move the new building on St. Nicholas Avenue gave the school hope that they would expand enrollment in the coming years.

== Awards and recognition ==
The school has collaborated with educational and cultural organizations including Classic Stage Company, Columbia University's Neuroscience Department, Harlem School of the Arts, Poetry Society of America, Princeton-Blairstown Center, and Rensselaer Polytechnic Institute.
