= Fletcher Hanks =

American cartoonist (1899–1976)

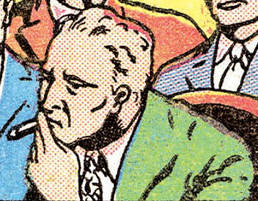
- An alleged self-portrait of Fletcher Hanks in Fantastic Comics #5 (April 1940), according to his son Fletcher Jr.
- Born: December 1, 1889 Paterson, New Jersey, U.S.
- Died: January 22, 1976 (aged 86) New York City, U.S.
- Area: Cartoonist
- Pseudonyms: Hank Christy; Charles Netcher; C. C. Starr; Barclay Flagg; Bob Jordan; Lance Ferguson; Chris Fletcher; Henry Fletcher; Carlson Merrick
- Notable works: Stardust the Super Wizard; Fantomah

Fletcher Hanks Sr. (December 1, 1889 – January 22, 1976) was an American cartoonist from the Golden Age of Comic Books, who wrote and drew stories detailing the adventures of all-powerful, supernatural heroes and their elaborate punishments of transgressors. In addition to his birth name, Hanks worked under a number of pen names, including Hank Christy, Charles Netcher, C. C. Starr, and Barclay Flagg. Hanks was active in comic books from 1939 to 1941.

== Early life ==
Little is known of the life of Fletcher Hanks. He was born on December 1, 1889, in Paterson, New Jersey, and grew up in Oxford, Maryland. His father, William Hanks, was a Methodist minister, and his mother, Alice Fletcher Hanks, was a daughter of English immigrants. They married c. 1885. Fletcher himself married Margaret c. 1912. In 1910, his mother paid for her son to take the W. L. Evans correspondence course in cartooning; as early as 1911 he described himself as a cartoonist. His nickname was "Christy", in reference to the great baseball pitcher Christy Mathewson.

== Career ==
Around 1936, Hanks worked on the Federal Art Project creating drawings of furniture and metalwork for the Index of American Design in New York City. Seven of his drawings are in the collection of the National Gallery of Art.

In 1939, in the wake of the success of Action Comics and Superman, Hanks began producing comic book stories. Gradually, he abandoned the crosshatch-heavy style he had learned in his Evans courses and settled on a cleaner, thick-lined style that reproduced better in the cheaply manufactured comic books.

Some of Hanks' work was for the Eisner & Iger comic book packaging company. Will Eisner recalled Hanks as a punctual artist whose work was reminiscent of the early work of Basil Wolverton. Hanks did all the work on his comics, from the writing to the lettering, and was considerably older than the other artists who worked there — many of whom were teenagers. The primary publishers he produced work for were Fiction House and Fox Features Syndicate. His creations include Stardust the Super Wizard, Tabu the Wizard of the Jungle, Big Red McLane, and Fantomah. One of the first female superheroes, Fantomah debuted in February 1940, predating Wonder Woman by a year.

He produced work for three publishers under a number of alias names, including Hank Christy, Charles Netcher, C. C. Starr, and Barclay Flagg, the last of which he signed to his Fantomah stories. He used his real name on his Stardust the Super Wizard stories. In all Fletcher Hanks created 51 stories. His name was also used as an alias for other unknown comic-book artists, as is the case with "The Brain Men of Mars" and "The Solar Pirates". Hanks left the comic book industry in 1941. The reason is still unknown. He continued to live in Oxford, Maryland, where he served as the president of its town commission from 1958–1960.

Hanks's non comic work can be found in the collection of the National Gallery of Art.

Notable works of Fletcher Hanks

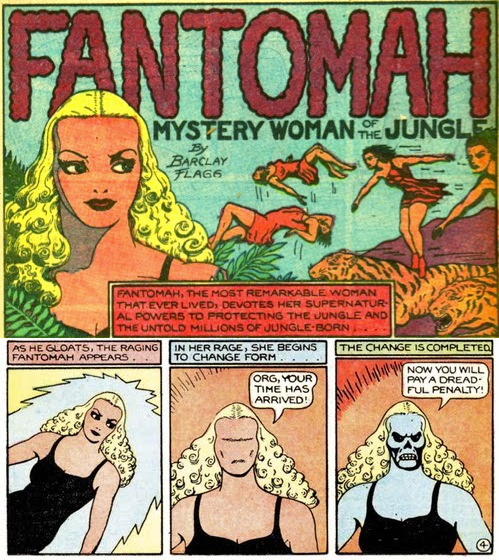
Fantomah transforming, as seen in Jungle Comics #15 (Fiction House, March 1941)

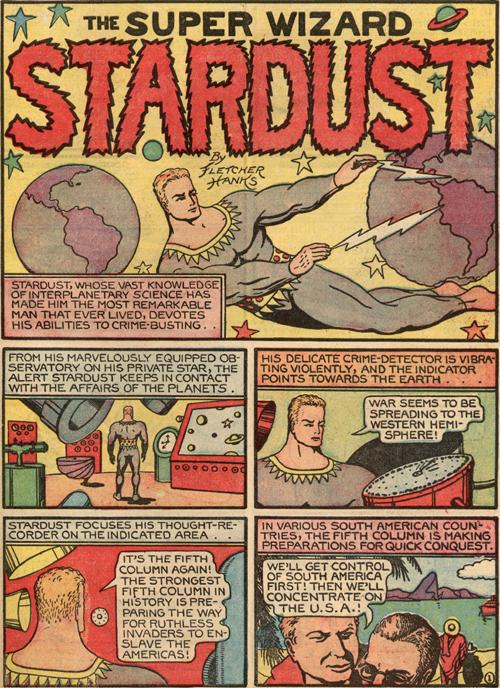
Stardust the Super Wizard from Fantastic Comics #14 (April 1941)

== Personal life and death ==
Hanks had four children: William, Fletcher Jr. (also nicknamed "Christy"), Alma, and Douglas. Fletcher Jr. (1918–2008) was the primary source of biographical information on his father. Family members have described Fletcher Sr. as an abusive father and spouse, and an alcoholic, spoiled by an over-indulgent mother. He made money painting murals for the wealthy, and spent the money on alcohol for himself and his friends. Fletcher Jr. worked odd jobs to support the family; in 1930, (Note: The US census return for 1930 describes Hanks as an artist, living with his wife, Margaret, widowed father, William, and his children Douglas, Alma, Fletcher Jr, and William.) he found his earnings missing, along with his father. Fletcher Jr. said his mother responded, "It's a small price to pay to be rid of the bum."

His body was found on a park bench in Manhattan in 1976, having frozen to death. He died penniless.

== Legacy ==
His stories and art have been reprinted in the magazine Raw and several comics anthologies. A complete edition of his work has been edited by Paul Karasik and published by Fantagraphics Books: I Shall Destroy All the Civilized Planets! (2007) and You Shall Die by Your Own Evil Creation! (2009), as well an omnibus collecting both previous books titled Turn Loose Our Death Rays and Destroy Them All! (Fantagraphics, 2016).

His grandson Ian also works as an artist.

== Bibliography ==
The following is a list of Hanks' published works, organized by character and the pen-name under which they were published:

- Stardust the Super Wizard (as Fletcher Hanks)
  - "Presidential Assassination," Fantastic Comics #1 (Fox Feature Syndicate, Dec. 1939)
  - "Rip the Blood," Fantastic Comics #2 (Jan. 1940)
  - "The Demon's Tidal Wave," Fantastic Comics #3 (Feb. 1940)
  - "The Mad Giant," Fantastic Comics #4 (Mar. 1940)
  - "Wolf's Eye Vacuum Tubes," Fantastic Comics #5 (Apr. 1940)
  - "The Brain Men of Mars," Fantastic Comics #6 (May. 1940) (Note: Hanks' name was used as an alias by an unknown artist.)
  - "Gyp Clip's Anti-Gravity Ray," Fantastic Comics #7 (June 1940)
  - "The Emerald Men of Asperus," Fantastic Comics #8 (July 1940)
  - "The Solar Pirates" Fantastic Comics #9 (Aug. 1939)
  - "The Super Fiend," Fantastic Comics #10 (Sept. 1940)
  - "Skullface Takes Over New York," Fantastic Comics #11 (Oct. 1940)
  - "Kaos and the Vultures," Fantastic Comics #12 (Nov. 1940)
  - "The Fifth Columnists," Fantastic Comics #13 (Dec. 1940)
  - "The Sixth Columnists," Fantastic Comics #14 (Jan. 1941)
  - "The World Invaders," Fantastic Comics #15 (Feb. 1941)
  - "Slant Eyes," Fantastic Comics #16 (Mar. 1941)
  - "DeStructo and the Headhunter," Big 3 #2 (Fox Feature Syndicate, Winter 1941)
- Space Smith (as Hank Christy)
  - "Captured by Skomah," Fantastic Comics #1 (Fox Feature Syndicate, Dec. 1939)
  - "The Martian Ogres," Fantastic Comics #2 (Jan. 1940)
  - "The Leopard Women of Venus," Fantastic Comics #3 (Feb. 1940)
  - "The Thinker," Fantastic Comics #4 (Mar. 1940)
  - "The Hoppers," Fantastic Comics #5 (Apr. 1940)
  - "The Vacuumites," Fantastic Comics #6 (May 1940)
  - "Planet Bloodu," Fantastic Comics #8 (July 1940)
- Big Red McLane (as Chris Fletcher or Charles Netcher)
  - (Fletcher) "King of the North Woods," Fight Comics #1 (Fiction House, Jan. 1940)
  - (Fletcher) "The Red River Gang," Fight Comics #2 (Feb. 1940)
  - (unsigned) "The Timber Thieves," Fight Comics #3 (Mar. 1940)
  - (unsigned) "The Lumber Hijackers," Fight Comics #4 (Apr. 1940)
  - (Netcher) "The Sinister Stranger," Fight Comics #5 (May 1940)
  - (Netcher) "The Paper Racketeers," Fight Comics #6 (June 1940)
  - (Netcher) "Sledge Sloan Gang," Fight Comics #7 (July 1940)
  - (Netcher) "The Monk's War Rockets," Fight Comics #8 (Aug. 1940)
  - (Netcher) "Searching for Sally Breen," Fight Comics #9 (Sept. 1940)
- Fantomah (as Barclay Flagg)
  - "The Elephants' Graveyard," Jungle Comics #2 (Fiction House, Feb. 1940)
  - "The City of Gold," Jungle Comics #3 (Mar. 1940)
  - "The Super-Gorillas" Jungle Comics #4 (Apr. 1940)
  - "Mundoor and the Giant Reptiles" Jungle Comics #5 (May 1940)
  - "Phantom of the Tree-Tops," Jungle Comics #6 (June 1940)
  - "Diamond Thieves," Jungle Comics #7 (July 1940)
  - "The Temple in the Mud Pit," Jungle Comics #8 (Aug. 1940)
  - "Lions Loose in New York," Jungle Comics #9 (Sept. 1940)
  - "The Flaming Claws," Jungle Comics #10 (Oct. 1940)
  - "The Scarlet Shadow," Jungle Comics #11 (Nov. 1940)
  - "The New Blitzers," Jungle Comics #12 (Dec. 1940)
  - "The Tiger-Women of Wildmoon Mountain," Jungle Comics #13 (Jan. 1941)
  - "The Revenge of Zomax," Jungle Comics #14 (Feb. 1941)
  - "Org's Giant Spiders," Jungle Comics #15 (Mar. 1941)
- Whirlwind Carter (as C. C. Starr)
  - "Mars Attacks," Daring Mystery Comics #4 (Timely Comics, May 1940)
  - "Planet of Black-Light," Daring Mystery Comics #5 (June 1940)
- Other characters:
  - Tabu the Jungle Wizard (as Henry Fletcher): "The Slave Raiders," Jungle Comics #1 (Fiction House, Jan. 1940)
  - Tiger Hart (as Carlson Merrick): "The Dashing, Slashing Adventure of the Great Solinoor Diamond," Planet Comics #2 (Fiction House, Feb. 1940)
  - Yank Wilson (as Lance Ferguson): "The Saboteurs," Fantastic Comics #6 (Fox Feature Syndicate, May 1940)
  - Buzz Crandall (as Bob Jordan): "Lepus and the Colliding Planets," Planet Comics #7 (July 1940)
