= Robert Pious =

American painter and illustrator (1908–1983)

- Born: Robert Savon Pious; March 7, 1908; Meridian, Mississippi, U.S.
- Died: February 1, 1983 (aged 74); The Bronx, New York City, U.S.
- Education: Art Institute of Chicago; National Academy of Design
- Known for: Painting, illustration
- Movement: Harlem Renaissance

Robert Savon Pious (March 7, 1908 – February 1, 1983) was an American painter and illustrator who is best known for producing cartoons, portraits, and illustrations for books, newspapers, and pulp magazines. In 1929, Pious received a prestigious Spingarn Prize for drawing from the William E. Harmon Foundation. In 1940, he won first prize in a national poster contest for the American Negro Exposition in Chicago.

== Life and career ==
Pious was born on March 7, 1908, in Meridian, Mississippi, in the United States. His parents, Nathaniel and Loula Pious, were the children of freed slaves, and his father worked on the railroad before dying in 1914. His mother remarried a year later, and the family moved to St. Louis, Missouri, and subsequently to Chicago. Pious graduated high school in Chicago in 1926 and began attending the School of the Art Institute of Chicago in 1927 while working nights at a printing plant. In 1928, he married college student Ruth G. Mitchell. Pious left college after two years to pursue his career as a freelance commercial illustrator. He composed editorial cartoons, advertisements, and illustrations for Continental Features, a firm that supplied African American newspapers. He supplemented his income by painting portraits of Chicago's African American elites. In 1929, Pious's pen-and-ink portrait of Roland Hayes won the prestigious Spingarn Black and White prize from the William E. Harmon Foundation.

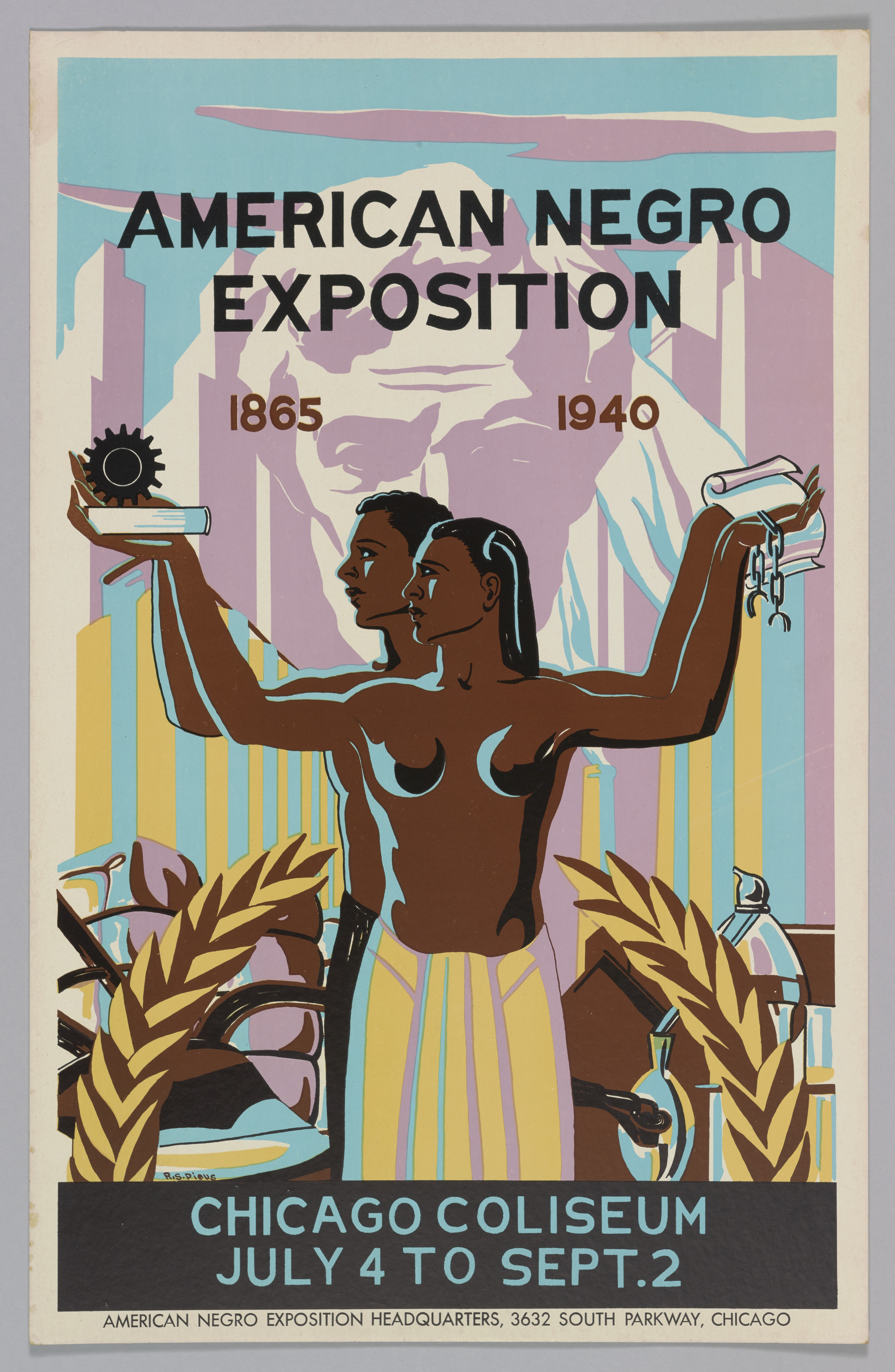
Poster for the American Negro Exposition in Chicago, 1940

In 1931, Pious received a four-year scholarship to study at the National Academy of Design in New York City. He moved to Harlem, where he participated in the Harlem Renaissance and befriended African American artists and scholars such as Charles Seifert, Augusta Savage, Ernest Crichlow, Charles Alston, Norman Lewis, Joseph Delaney, Romare Bearden, and Jacob Lawrence. In 1933, he ran a short-lived comic strip called The Dopes (later The Dupes), which featured a middle-class Black family and achieved syndication in Black newspapers such as the Pittsburgh Courier and the Atlanta Daily World. Pious's portraits of African American celebrities, including Paul Robeson, Richmond Barthé, Adam Clayton Powell Jr., and Marian Anderson, appeared on the covers of Opportunity: A Journal of Negro Life. During the Great Depression, Pious taught art at the Harlem branch of the YMCA and painted murals on the walls of New York City clinics, libraries, and schools, including DeWitt Clinton High School, for the WPA Federal Art Project. In 1936, he designed the poster for the Texas Centennial Exposition.

In 1940, Pious won first prize in a national poster contest for the American Negro Exposition, a world's fair held in Chicago to celebrate the 75th anniversary of the Emancipation Proclamation. Pious beat out a hundred entrants and received a $100 prize from Mayor Fiorello La Guardia at New York City Hall. Photos of the award ceremony appeared in national newspapers. His poster appeared on the cover of the Exposition's official program.

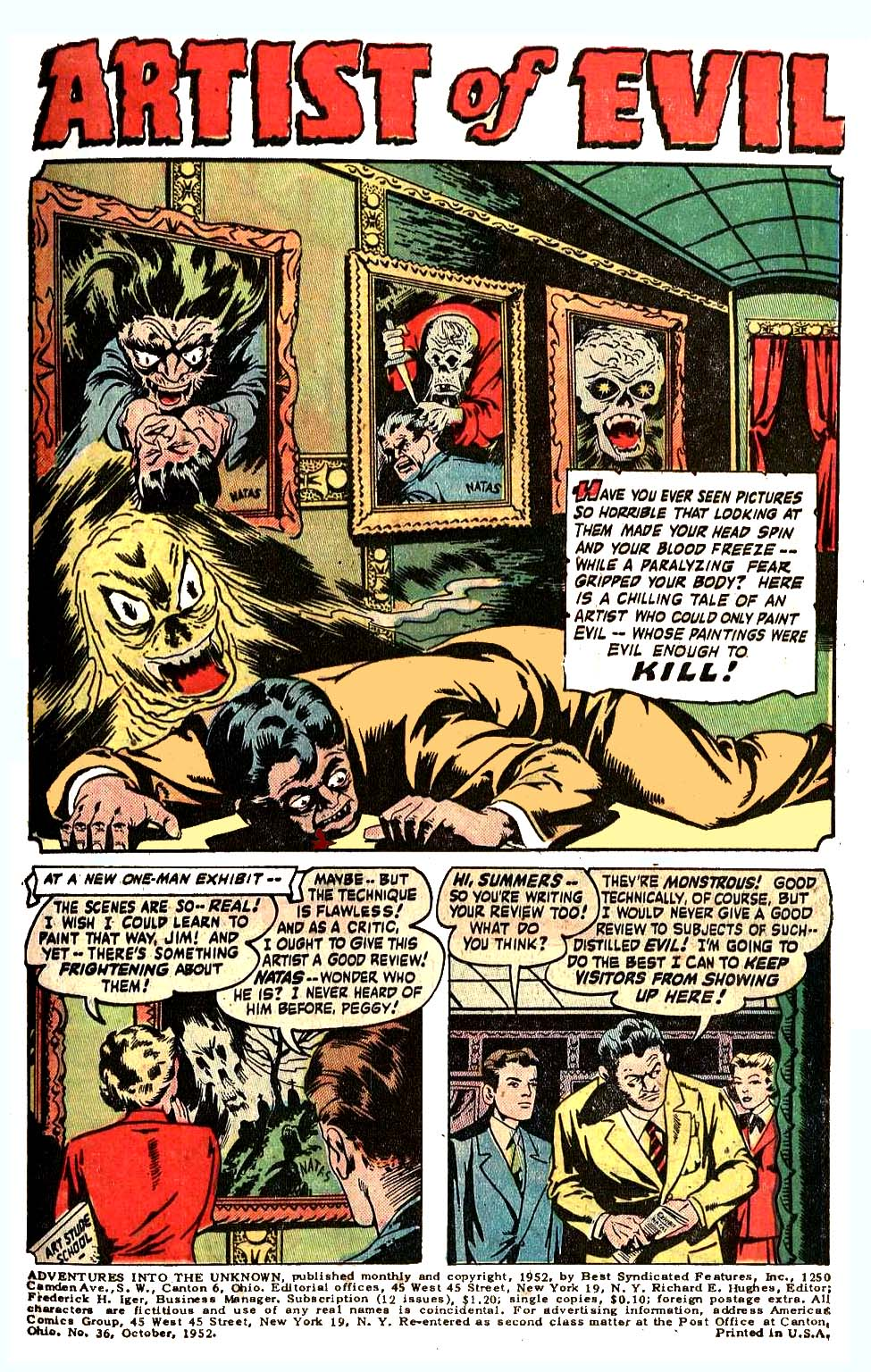
Comic book cover, 1952

During the 1940s, Pious produced cartoons for the United States Office of War Information and illustrated stories in pulp magazines and comic books. Starting in the 1950s, he also illustrated books for well-known publishers such as Grosset & Dunlap. From the 1960s onward, his portraits of notable African Americans appeared regularly on covers of the National Scene, a weekly distributed nationwide as a Sunday supplement in African American newspapers. His 1951 oil-on-canvas portrait of Harriet Tubman is held by the National Portrait Gallery.

Pious died at his home in the Bronx on February 1, 1983, at the age of 74.
