= John Giunta =

American Comic Book Illustrator active 1940-1960

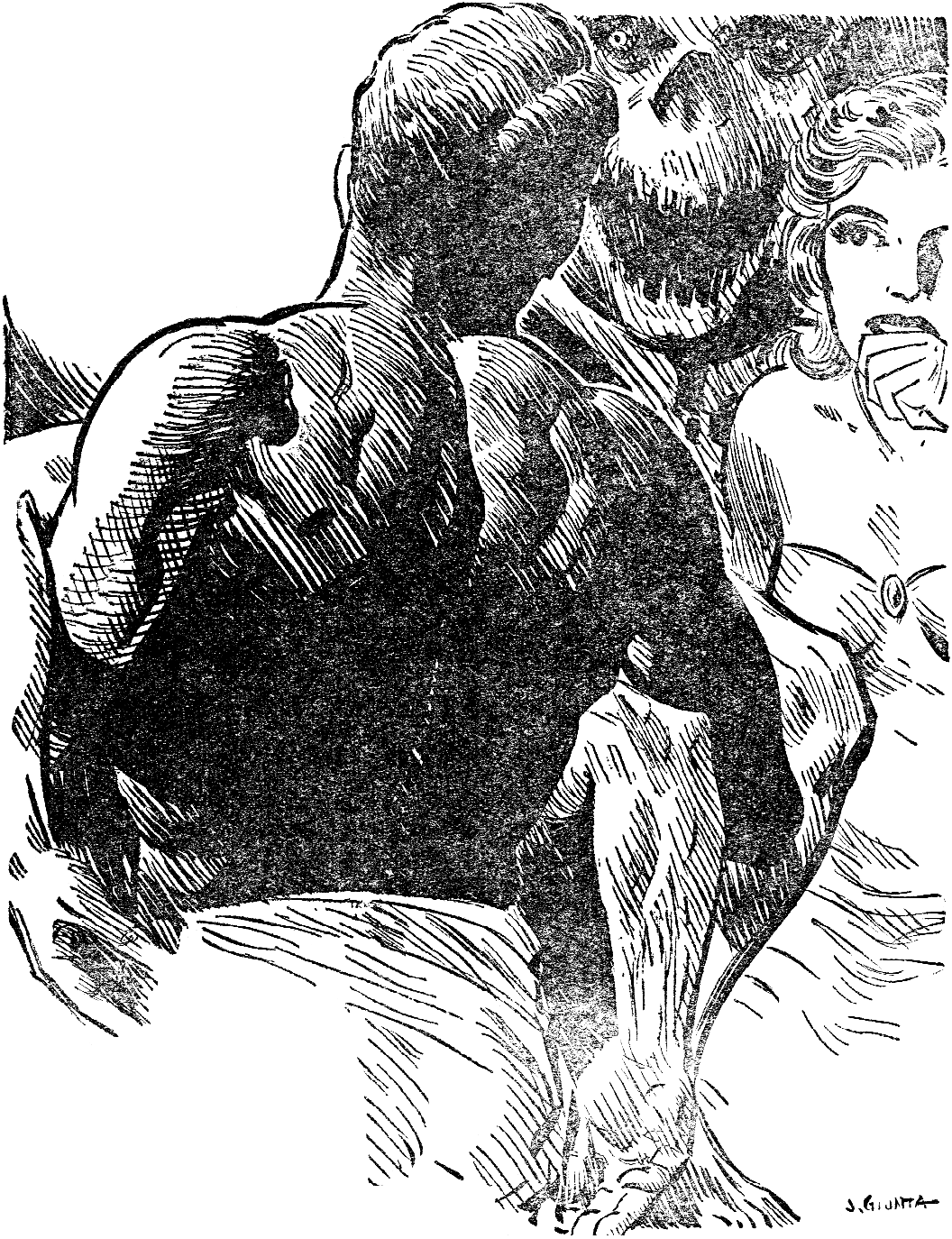
Art by John Giunta

John Giunta (June 5, 1920 – November 6, 1970) was an American illustrator of comic books from the 1940s through the 1960s. He worked on horror titles like Tomb of Terror, Chamber of Chills (Harvey), Journey into Mystery (Marvel) and the pulp magazine Weird Tales. In 1944, he drew the first comic adaptation of O. Henry's Cisco Kid. In the early 1960s, he became a regular artist on The Fly for Archie Comics. He also worked on titles like Thunder Agents, Air Fighters Comics and Phantom Stranger.

He is best known for collaborating with Frank Frazetta on Frazetta's first published comic book story, "Snowman", from Tally-Ho Comics #1 in December 1944.
