= Southwesterncon =

Series of regional multi-genre fan conventions

- Status: Defunct
- Genre: Comic books, television, movies, pop culture
- Locations: (rotating) Dallas, Houston, Oklahoma City
- Country: United States
- Inaugurated: 1966; 60 years ago
- Most recent: 1971
- Organizer: Larry Herndon; Houston Comic Collector's Association; Oklahoma Alliance of Fans

Southwesterncon was a series of regional multi-genre fan conventions held annually in Texas and Oklahoma between 1966 and 1971 (and then sporadically afterward until 1981). On a rotating basis, conventions were held in Dallas ("D-Con"), Houston ("Houstoncon"), and Oklahoma City ("Multicon"). Most Southwesterncons took place over three days in June. Southwesterncon is credited with being one of the earliest ongoing comic book conventions in the United States.

The initial plan for Southwesterncon was explained by Oklahoma Alliance of Fans co-founder Bart Bush: "Dallas held the first Southwesterncon in 1966, Houston held the second one in 1967, and then it went back to Dallas in 1968. The idea is that they would each do the con every other year." Oklahoma City joined Southwesterncon in 1970.

The convention featured a large range of pop culture elements, primarily comic books but also radio and television serials, science fiction/fantasy (particularly Star Trek), film/television, animation, toys, and horror, as well as a costume contest. Nostalgia for times past played an important role: all Southwesterncon events featured screenings of classic science fiction films and old television serials. The convention featured panels with comic book professionals, and floorspace for exhibitors, including comic book dealers and collectibles merchants. The show included an autograph area, as well as an Artists' Alley where comics artists signed autographs and sold or did free sketches. (Despite the name, Artists' Alley could include writers, celebrities, and even glamour models.)

== History ==
=== Predecessor ===
There was an earlier "Southwesterncon": a science fiction convention held in Dallas on July 5–6, 1958. Organized by Tom Reamy and James and Gregory Benford of the Dallas Futurian Society (DFS) (so named after the earlier New York Futurians), Southwesterncon was the first science fiction convention held in Texas. The professional guest of honor was Marion Zimmer Bradley. Longtime science fiction fan personality, collector, and literary agent Forrest J Ackerman came from Los Angeles and served as the convention's banquet toastmaster.

The 1958 Southwesterncon was actually the sixth edition of a regional, rotating city and state series of cons which had started as "Oklacon", editions of which had previously been held in Oklahoma City, Tulsa, and Enid. On the last day of the convention, as part of Southwestercon VI's business meeting, the members of the DFS disbanded their club (due to much behind-the-scenes intrigue and politics). That event spelled the end of the Oklacon/Southwesterncon series of science fiction conventions.

=== 1966–1971: Southwesterncons I–VI ===
1966 Southwesterncon I (Dallas)

In 1966, Dallas-based comics enthusiast Larry Herndon (co-publisher of the fanzine Star Studded Comics) revived the Southerwesterncon name as a multi-genre convention with a strong comic book focus. On July 23–24, 1966, the new Southerwesterncon (originally titled "Southwestern Con") was inaugurated at Dallas' Hotel Southland. The official guest was Academy of Comic-Book Fans and Collectors executive secretary and Academy Con promoter Dave Kaler. There were approximately 70 attendees at the convention, including Tom Reamy (of the previous iteration of Southwesterncon) and Camille Cazedessus Jr. Events included a costume contest, with Howard Waldrop among the participants. The 1936 British film Things to Come was shown instead of the promised 1933 film King Kong.

1967 Southwesterncon II (Houston)

Meanwhile, in 1965, Houston-based enthusiasts Ray Bonario, Marc Schooley, and Jerry Poscovsky formed the Houston Comic Collector's Association (HCCA). In 1967, the HCCA produced the second Southwesterncon, officially known as the "Houston Comic Convention", expanding it to three days and staging it at the Houston Ramada Inn on June 16–18 of that year.

Movies shown at the convention included Metropolis (1927), Shadows Over Chinatown (a 1946 Charlie Chan feature), Behind the Mask (a 1946 The Shadow feature), and Dick Tracy vs. Crime, Inc. (1941).

The first Houstoncon attracted 124 attendees, including Larry Herndon and Buddy Saunders. The con was later given the 1967 Alley Award for Best Fan Project.

1968 Southwesterncon III (Dallas)

The third Southerwesterncon was held in 1968 at the Hotel Southland in Dallas. Produced by Larry Herndon and Tom Reamy, official guests included special guest Fritz Leiber, guest of honor Harold LeDoux, and H. H. Hollis.

Films shown at the con included The Jungle Book (1967), Song of India (1949), Mighty Joe Young (1949), Rocket Ship (the 1949 film version of the 1936 serial Flash Gordon), King Kong (1933), the complete 12-chapter Adventures of Captain Marvel (1941), and Tarzan of the Apes (1918). The Friday night "non-stop theater" advertised screenings of Münchhausen (1943), The Thief of Baghdad (1940), The Vampire Bat (1933), and a couple of Laurel and Hardy films. On Sunday afternoon, convention-goers were invited to a showing of 2001: A Space Odyssey at the nearby Capri Theater.

The con attracted 160 attendees, including Buddy Saunders, Howard Keltner, Howard Waldrop, and Rocket's Blast Comicollector publisher G. B. Love, attending his first such event.

1969 Southwesterncon IV (Houston)

The fourth Southwesterncon returned to Houston in 1969. Panelists included Camille Cazedessus Jr. and G. B. Love. Movies shown at the con included King of the Rocket Men (1949), Island of Lost Souls (1932), Steamboat Willie (1928) & Plane Crazy (1928), "World is Born" (The Rite of Spring portion of Fantasia, 1940), Dead of Night (1945), and The Good Humor Man (1950), as well as "shorts, cartoons, and amateur films."

1970 Southwesterncon V (Oklahoma City)

Meanwhile, in March 1967, Oklahoma-based comics enthusiasts Bart Bush, Paul McSpadden, John Wooley, and others had founded the Oklahoma Alliance of Fans (OAF) in an Oklahoma City garage. OAF joined the Southwesterncon "team" in 1970, as explained by OAF-co-founder Bart Bush. "Dallas announced that it was bidding to host the 1973 World Science Fiction Convention, so it didn't want to do the Southwesterncon in 1970. That's when OAF stepped forward to do the 1970 con. Dallas put their support behind us, as did Houston, who didn't want to do the con in two successive years." (Note: Ultimately, Dallas was not chosen as the 1973 Worldcon host; that distinction went to Toronto, which hosted Torcon II.)

The third leg of Southwesterncon, officially dubbed "Multicon 70," was held at the Skirvan Hotel in Oklahoma City on June 19–21, 1970. Don Maris and Robert A. Brown of OAF acted as convention chairs. Buster Crabbe was the guest of honor and Reed Crandall was the guest speaker. Other guests included Jim Harmon. The show featured an exhibition of the world's largest private collection of Frank Frazetta's art.

Complete serials shown included Drums of Fu Manchu (1940), The Phantom Creeps (1939), Mars Attacks the World (a 1938 Flash Gordon adventure), and a Buck Rogers serial; films included The Road to Yesterday (1925), King Kong (1933), The Shadow Strikes (1937), Freaks (1932), and Siegfried (1924).

Among the 511 attendees was G. B. Love. The teenage comics dealer Bud Plant drove from San Diego to attend the show; he was nearly arrested for selling "pornography" due to the underground comix he displayed at his table.

1971 Southwesterncon VI (Dallas)

In 1971, disputes amongst the Southwesterncon members led to both Houston and Dallas staging conventions that year. The Houston Comic Collector's Association staged Houstoncon '71 on June 17–20, while the Dallas contingent put on "D-Con '71" — billed as the 6th annual Southwesterncon — on July 8–11; Robert Bloch was the guest of honor.

=== 1972–1981: D-Con and Multicon continue the tradition ===
With Houstoncon going out on its own and by 1973 becoming an annual event, the other legs of Southwesterncon — Dallas' D-Con and Oklahoma City's Multicon — continued the tradition of rotating convention sites (though not always every other year).

1972 Multicon

Multicon returned to Oklahoma City in 1972 with Eric Groves and Don Maris of OAF producing the convention. Guests included Will Eisner, attending only his second-ever comic convention (and illustrating the convention booklet); other guests included Spanky McFarland, George Evans, Lum and Abner, and Tim Holt. For the teenage Chuck Rozanski, the 1972 Multicon was his first national comics convention; he sold $1,800 in comics in three days, at that point realizing that comics retailing could be a career. The young Robert Beerbohm also set up as a dealer at that show.

1973 D-Con

"D-Con '73", held June 27–July 1, featured guests such as Harlan Ellison, William Gaines, Burne Hogarth, Andrew J. Offutt, and Jerry Bails. Other attendees/retailers included Russ Cochran, Bud Plant, John Barrett, and Bob Beerbohm. The convention chairman was Joe Bob Williams; tickets were $7.50 at the door. Events included a costume contest, an art show, and a three-day art auction.

According to Chuck Rozanski, Harlan Ellison "liv[ed] up to his bad boy reputation by offending practically everyone in the state of Texas with his profanity-laced keynote address, and his genuinely derogatory depiction of the Lone Star State... In any event, I understand that Harlan was officially disinvited from any further Dallas shows after that one colorful appearance."

Movies and serials shown at the convention (often running into the early-morning hours) included Barbarella (1968), Marooned (1969), Colossus: The Forbin Project (1970), Ghost of Zorro (1949), Zorro Rides Again (1937), Cowboy and the Prizefighter (1949), Bulldog Drummond Comes Back (1937), Cat-Women of the Moon (1953), Dangerous Mission (1954), Devil's Canyon (1953), The Vampire Lovers (1970), The Assassination Bureau (1969), Planet Outlaws (a 1939 Buck Rogers serial), Mars Attacks the World (a 1938 Flash Gordon film), Transatlantic Tunnel (1935), Tales From the Crypt (1972), Gone Fishin', King Kong (1933), King of the Rocket Men (1949), The Abominable Dr. Phibes (1971), Dr. Phibes Rises Again (1972), Jack and the Beanstalk (1952), Abbott and Costello Meet Captain Kidd (1952), "Demon with a Glass Hand" (1964 episode of The Outer Limits), Silent Running (1972), The French Line (1954), Outlaw Territory (1953), Commando Cody: Sky Marshal of the Universe (1953), Invaders From Mars (1953), Beginning of the End (1957), and the complete 13-chapter serial Red Barry (1938).

(Houstoncon '73 had taken place the previous weekend, with guests including Kirk Alyn, Frank Coghlan, Jr., William Benedict, William Witney, Dave Sharpe, Al Williamson, and Don Newton.)

1975 Multicon

Multicon '75, the third edition of Oklahoma's convention, was produced by OAF members Don Maris and Eric J. Groves; guests included George Takei, George Pal, Spanky McFarland, Bret Morrison, Jim Bannon, Al Williamson, and Steve Barrington.

The film programming was heavy on Star Trek content, with showings of blooper reels and selected episodes. Other films, serials, and TV shows included Undersea Kingdom (chapters 1-12, 1936), Philo Vance's Secret Mission (1947), California Gold Rush (1946), Forty Thieves (1944), Our Gang shorts, Planet of the Vampires (1965), an episode of The Outer Limits, episodes from the Adventures of Superman TV show, The Thin Man (1934), Ghosts on the Loose (1943), Riders of the Whistling Skull (1937), The Hard Hombre (1931), Dead Reckoning (1947), The Secret Life of Walter Mitty (1947), White Eagle (1941 Buck Jones serial, chapters 1–15), Mr. Moto Takes a Vacation (1939), and an episode of Amos 'n' Andy.

1976 D-Con

D-Con returned to Dallas in 1976.

1979 D-Con

D-Con 79 featured special guests Stephen R. Donaldson, Kelly Freas, Jack Kirby, Mike Royer, and Roy Thomas; and guests Kerry Gammill, Mike Presley, George Wyatt Proctor, Don Ivan Punchatz, Kenneth Smith, Roger Stine, and Don Markstein.

1981 Multicon

Multicon 81, the final edition of that show, was produced by OAF chairs Bart Bush and Gary & Elaine Burleson; guests included John Byrne, L. B. Cole, Jim Engel, Chuck Fialla, Mike McQuay, John Wooley, and Ron Wolfe.

A "Multicon '82" for the following year was promised, but never ended up happening.

== Legacy ==
Larry Lankford, who produced D-Con '79, went on to produce the long-running Dallas Fantasy Fair.

OAF member Bart Bush later opened the first comic book retailer in Oklahoma: Down Memory Lane in Norman. In 2007, the 40th anniversary of the formation of the Oklahoma Alliance of Fans, Bart Bush created OAFcon, a comics convention held in Norman. "OAFcon proved popular enough that it became an annual event and drew collectors from across the nation." Bush died in 2020, and "Peter Purin, organizer of Uncanny Comic Expo, took over running the show in 2021." OAFcon '22 took place September 17–18, 2022, at the Embassy Suites in Norman. Focusing "on Tarzan, The Shadow, and more," author Mike Chapman was the featured special guest, along with Anthony Tollin, J. David Spurlock, Buddy Saunders, and Steve Borock of MyComicShop.com.

== Convention locations and dates ==
=== Southwesterncon era ===
Dates	Convention name	Venue/location	Guests	Source
July 23–24, 1966	Southwestern Con	Hotel Southland; Dallas	Dave Kaler	
June 16–18, 1967	Houston Comic Convention	Houston		
June 21–23, 1968	Southwesterncon	Hotel Southland; Dallas	Harold LeDoux (guest of honor), Fritz Leiber, H. H. Hollis	
June 20–22, 1969	Southwesterncon/Houston Con '69	Ramada Inn; Houston		
June 19–21, 1970	Multicon 70	Skirvan Hotel; Oklahoma City	Buster Crabbe (guest of honor), Reed Crandall (guest speaker)	
July 8–11, 1971	D-Con '71 (Southwesterncon VI)	Sheraton-Dallas Hotel; Dallas	Robert Bloch	

=== Post-Southwesterncon ===
Dates	Convention name	Venue/location	Guests	Source
June 1972	Multicon 72	Biltmore Hotel; Oklahoma City	Will Eisner, Spanky McFarland, George Evans, Lum and Abner, Tim Holt	
June 28–July 1, 1973	D-Con '73	Sheraton Hotel; Dallas	Harlan Ellison, William Gaines, Burne Hogarth, Andrew J. Offutt, Jerry Bails	
June 19–22, 1975	Multicon '75	Oklahoma City	George Takei, George Pal, Spanky McFarland, Bret Morrison, Jim Bannon, Al Williamson, Steve Barrington	
June 11–14, 1976	D-Con '76	Sheraton Hotel; Dallas		
June 7–10, 1979	D-Con '79	Holiday Inn Central; Dallas	Special guests: Stephen R. Donaldson, Kelly Freas, Jack Kirby, Mike Royer, Roy Thomas; Guests Kerry Gammill, Mike Presley, George Wyatt Proctor, Don Ivan Punchatz, Kenneth Smith, Roger Stine, Don Markstein	
July 3–5, 1981	Multicon 81	Lincoln Plaza Inn; Oklahoma City	John Byrne, L. B. Cole, Jim Engel, Chuck Fialla, Mike McQuay, John Wooley, Ron Wolfe	

== See also ==
- D-Con (Dundee Convention), a defunct anime convention held in Dundee, Scotland
