= Dave Kaler =

American comics writer

David A. Kaler
- Born: 1936 (age 88–89)
- Occupation(s): Writer, Market researcher
- Known for: Comics fandom Academy Con (1965–1967)
- Notable work: Captain Atom (1966–1967); Ghostly Tales (1966–1968)
- Title: Executive Secretary, Academy of Comic-Book Fans and Collectors (1965–1968)
- Awards: Alley Award (x3)

David A. Kaler (b. 1936) is an American writer. He was a primary force in establishing 1960s comic book fandom, particularly through the form of the comics convention. Later, he had a short-lived career as a comics writer for such publishers as Charlton Comics, DC Comics, and Warren Publishing.

== Biography ==
=== Fandom ===
In 1965, Kaler was living in New York City, sharing an East Village apartment with burgeoning comics writers Dennis O'Neil and Roy Thomas. Employed as a market researcher, Kaler had a collection of between 4,000 and 5,000 comics.

By that point, Kaler was Executive Secretary of the Academy of Comic-Book Fans and Collectors (ACBFC), "... a fandom organization that would ... perpetuate the concept of comics as an art form." The group's charter included the formation of the Alley Awards, the publication of the comic news fanzine The Comic Reader, and the creation of "a directory of comic fans" to assist in establishing a yearly comics convention and to endorse a "code of fair practice in the selling and trading of comic books."

Under Kaler's leadership, the academy produced three successful conventions in New York City during the summers of 1965–1967, and attracting industry professionals such as Otto Binder, Bill Finger, Gardner Fox, Mort Weisinger, James Warren, Roy Thomas, Gil Kane, Stan Lee, Bill Everett, Carmine Infantino, Julius Schwartz, Frank Frazetta, Roy Krenkel, and Stephen Hickman. Kaler was given the 1965 Alley Award for Best Fan Project for his production of the first so-called "Academy Con".

In the summer of 1966, Kaler was the guest of honor at the first Southwesterncon, the first comics convention held in Texas.

During this period, Kaler also wrote the "What's News" column for the comics news fanzine The Comic Reader. For this work, he was twice selected for Alley Awards.

In early 1968, Kaler left the ACBFC to pursue his professional comics writing. Nonetheless, he planned another Academy Con for the 1968 Thanksgiving weekend, but it never came to pass, possibly because of the successful first iteration of Phil Seuling's Comic Art Convention (a.k.a. the "International Convention of Comic Book Art"), which took place in New York City in the summer of 1968. By this point, comics fandom had become well established, with annual conventions being held in New York, Detroit, St. Louis, and the Southwest, and the academy's mission had been essentially fulfilled. Academy member Maggie Thompson declared the ACBFC "moribund" and the group had disbanded by 1970.

=== Comics writing ===
In 1966, Kaler's former roommate Roy Thomas got Kaler in the door at Charlton Comics, as Kaler began a short-lived stint as a professional comics writer, often writing horror comics. He started out on Charlton's superhero title Captain Atom (shortly before the title was canceled). With Steve Ditko, he co-created Nightshade in Captain Atom #82 (September 1966). Kaler's other writing for Charlton included on such titles as Ghostly Tales (1966–1968), The Many Ghosts of Doctor Graves (1967), Sarge Steel, Marine War Heroes (1967), Outlaws of the West (1967), and Tiffany Sinn (1967).

After his stint at Charlton, Kaler moved to Warren Publishing's horror title Eerie, where he wrote some stories in 1968.

In the period 1969–1971, Kaler wrote for the DC Comics' horror anthology The Witching Hour, also contributing a Wonder Woman story (written in 1968 but not published until 1974). He left comics writing in 1971.

In 1977, Kaler edited Vol. 3 ("Escapes to Arboria") of the Flash Gordon comic strip collection edited and published by Woody Gelman/Nostalgia Press.

== Awards ==
- 1965 Alley Award for Best Fan Project — New York Comicon
- 1966 Alley Award for Best Regular Fan Column — "What's News" (for On the Drawing Board section of The Comic Reader)
- 1967 Alley Award for Best Regular Fan Column — "What's News"
