= Jerry Bails =

American popular culturist

- Born: Jerry Gwin Bails; June 26, 1933; Kansas City, Missouri, U.S.
- Died: November 23, 2006 (aged 73); Macomb, Michigan, U.S.
- Education: University of Kansas City
- Occupation: Popular culturist
- Spouses: Sondra; Jean
- Children: Steven, Brenda, Kirk
- Awards: Inkpot Award (1981)

Jerry Gwin Bails (June 26, 1933 – November 23, 2006) was an American popular culturist. Known as the "Father of Comic Book Fandom," he was one of the first to approach the comic book field as a subject worthy of academic study, and was a primary force in establishing 1960s comics fandom.

== Biography ==
=== Early life ===
Jerry G. Bails was born on June 26, 1933, in Kansas City, Missouri. A fan of comic books from a very early age, Bails was a particularly a fan of All-Star Comics, and its premiere superteam (the Justice Society of America) of whom he was "a fan since the first Justice Society adventure appeared in All-Star Comics #3 (Winter 1941)." He wrote in 1960 that by 1945, he "began my campaign to collect all the back issues of this magazine [All-Star Comics]," and six years later when the JSA was dropped, started to work towards their revival. In the letters column of Fantastic Four #22 (cover-dated Jan. 1964) the editor refers to him as "one of fandom's most articulate critics."

=== Education ===
As a young man, he "sent samples of his art to EC ("and Al Feldstein was nice enough to respond with advice.")," before attending the University of Kansas City, from which he earned his Bachelor of Science degree in Physics, and then his Master's degree in Math. A student teacher by 1953, he gained his Ph.D. in Natural science c. 1959, and in 1960 moved to Detroit with his wife Sondra "to become Assistant Professor of Natural Science at Wayne State University."

== Comics fandom ==
=== Roots ===
In 1953, Bails wrote to DC (c/o Julius Schwartz) to inquire about issues of All-Star Comics. His letter was forwarded to former Justice Society writer Gardner Fox, and from Fox's reply of July 9, 1953, the two corresponded regularly. Bails was working steadily toward re-building his personal collection of the early issues of All Star Comics, and was finally able to convince Fox in early 1959 to sell him Fox's personal bound copies of All-Star Comics #1-24.

In November 1960, a letter from young comics fan Roy Thomas to Julius Schwartz similarly inquiring about back issues of All-Star Comics led to Schwartz also putting Thomas in contact with All-Star writer Gardner Fox. Fox informed Thomas that "he had sold his bound volumes [of All-Star Comics] to a gent named Jerry Bails", and put Thomas in touch with the Detroit-based Bails. Bails and Thomas would go on to "exchange . . . 100 pages' worth of letters in less than five months" starting from the end of November 1960, and forge a friendship which in Thomas' words "set in motion a chain of events which led to Alter Ego, organized comics fandom, the Alley Awards, and maybe a bit more."

With the debut of the "new Justice Society," the Justice League of America in the pages of The Brave and the Bold #28 (1959), Bails felt his "efforts [had] finally paid off," and his career as an active fan began. He soon bombarded the DC offices with suggestions for new superhero revivals. For instance, in Justice League of America #4, the letters page is filled with missives from Bails under different pen names. He did everything he could to fool editor Julius Schwartz, including mailing the letters from all across the country.

In particular, Bails petitioned for the monthly publication of the JLA, and a year later for the revival of the Golden Age Atom as an all-new "6"-high" hero (to better reflect the name), which "whether as a result of Jerry's prodding DC or by mere coincidence" revival occurred in January 1961.

=== Fanzines ===
Largely unbeknownst to Bails and Thomas, comics fandom had been underway for years in a variety of comics fanzines, beginning with Ted White's The Facts Behind Superman, James Taurasi's Fantasy Comics and Bhob Stewart's The EC Fan Bulletin in 1953-54. These were followed by Ron Parker's Hoohah, Dick and Pat Lupoff's Xero and Don and Maggie Thompson's Comic Art. Xero presented essays about comics ultimately collected in a 1970 book, All in Color for a Dime, published in hardcover by Arlington House and by Ace in paperback. Although Bails' innovative ideas changed the shape of comics fandom, and arguably shaped it anew, Xero had a significant role to play in Bails' work.

Bill Schelly writes that, while important building blocks, the science fiction fanzines should be considered in the context of comics fandom. He notes that Don and Maggie Thompson's Comic Art and Xero were published by double-fans [science fiction and comics] and were read mainly by sf fans who generally had little interest in (or disdain for) new comics, even the Schwartz revivals. The Thompsons' interest was in just about every aspect of comic art but the superhero comics of 1961.

Helped in large part to the efforts of DC editor Julius Schwartz and writer Gardner Fox, Bails would play a pivotal role in the fledgling field of comics fandom, which he called "panelology" (the study of comics).

Bails was the founding editor of Alter-Ego, one of the very earliest superhero comics fanzines. "On January 26, 1961," wrote Roy Thomas in 2003, "I received a letter from Jerry mentioning his idea for a "JLA newsletter" . . . [to which he was intending] to try to enlist Julie Schwartz's cooperation" in February 1961. The projected title and scope of The JLA Subscriber "gave way to something more ambitious" and, returning from visiting the DC offices in New York, Bails:

"had come up with the name "Alter-ego" for a more ambitious version of a newsletter — a "fanzine," appropriating some of what he had learned from Julie about science-fiction fandom to what he had already planned."

Schwartz had, indeed, given Bails copies of Xero #1-3, as well as personal advice and memories based on his own involvement in the earliest science fiction fandom of the 1930s, in which Schwartz played an important — perhaps even integral — role. Working with Thomas and in conjunction with Schwartz, Bails contacted other comic book letter writers and invited them to subscribe to and participate in Alter Ego. Thomas was named co-editor, and asked to contribute "a Mad-style parody, "The Bestest League of America." By March 28, Bails had prepared the ditto masters, and shortly thereafter "200 or more" copies of the first issue of the 21-page Alter-Ego #1 (now with a capital "E") were posted to Bails' ever-growing list of fans. The issue featured a "Bestest League" cover by Thomas and Bails, in homage to Mike Sekowsky's cover for The Brave and the Bold #29. The finished article became "an amateur journal devoted to the revivals of the costumed heroes at DC and elsewhere, as well as historical studies of what Bails deemed 'The First Heroic Age of Comics.'"

The original run of Alter Ego lasted 11 issues, spread over a total of 17 years. Ten issues were released between 1961 and 1969, with issue #11 following nine years later, in 1978. Bails edited and published the first four issues of Alter-Ego, before turning it over to fan-artist Ronn Foss (and, initially, Foss' wife, plus his friend "Grass" Green) who edited issues #5-6. Roy Thomas edited a further four issues solo, and issue #11 almost a decade later in collaboration with Mike Friedrich.

In 1998, Thomas wrote to publisher John Morrow, and shortly after Thomas relaunched the second volume of Alter Ego on the flipside of issues of TwoMorrows Publishing's Comic Book Artist. A third, standalone volume was launched as a separate magazine (with similarly revived fanzine the Fawcett Collectors of America as a section) in 1999, and continues to 2011.

Shortly after the launch of Alter-Ego, Bails founded The Comicollector, which launched in September 1961.

The major motivating force behind comics fandom "was to bring fans together for the purpose of adding to their comic book collections." Inspired in part by the science-fiction fanzine/"adzine" The Fantasy Collector, comics fandom had "a need for a publication devoted primarily to the field" rather than the occasional advertisements of comics for sale that appeared in The Fantasy Collector.

Bails' initial thought was "to run such ads in each issue of A/E, but it soon became clear that it couldn't be published often enough." Accordingly, in September 1961, the first issue of the 20-page Bails-published The Comicollector, the self-styled "companion to ALTER-EGO" (as the masthead declared it), and "first comics advertising fanzine." Included among adverts from the "stalwarts of fandom" (including Bails, John McGeehan and Ronn Foss among others) was a review of the first issue of The Fantastic Four by Roy Thomas, originally destined for the pages of Alter-Ego.

After publishing The Comicollector for a year, Bails passed it on to Ronn Foss, and in 1964 it merged with G. B. Love's fanzine The Rocket's Blast to form The Rocket's Blast and the ComiCollector.

A month after the debut of The Comicollector, in October 1961, Bails also founded and published On the Drawing Board, the forerunner to the long-running news-zine The Comic Reader, designed to showcase the latest comic news.

Spinning-off from Alter-Ego after appearing for three issues as a column within that publication, Bails' On the Drawing Board "was devoted to blurbs and news items pertaining to upcoming events in pro comics." Thanks to the links forged, and respect gained, by Bails with various key individuals involved in the creation of comics — and in particular, DC Comics' major editorial force Julius Schwartz — he was able to gain advanced knowledge and news of upcoming comics events, launches and the creators behind them. Released in standalone form as "a single-page news-sheet," On the Drawing Board #4 (#1-3 being applied to the columns appearing in those issues of A/E) debuted on October 7, 1961. Bill Schelly described, in 2003, its impact:

Suddenly, fans had a way to see what was coming up on the newsstands. In some cases, they also found out the names of the writers and artists of certain features, in an era before such credits were routinely given. While there was considerable interest in developments at DC (especially the revival of Hawkman), fans also closely followed the entrance of other companies into the costumed hero sweepstakes: Archie Comics, Gold Key, Charlton, and Marvel.

In March 1962, issue #8 of On the Drawing Board was retitled The Comic Reader, and the (generally) monthly title became "a mainstay of fandom." With issue #25 Bails ceded his editorial duties, first to Glen Johnson, and later individuals, including Mark Hanerfeld. New York teenager Paul Levitz revived The Comic Reader in 1971, and it continued until 1984.

=== The Academy of Comic-Book Fans and Collectors ===
Established in large part solely to deal with the Alley Awards (below), and inspired by Roy Thomas' thoughts on a comics-industry version of the Academy of Motion Picture Arts and Sciences, the name and workings of the Academy of Comic-Book Fans and Collectors became a way "to emphasize the seriousness of comics fans about their hobby." Bails further liked "the idea of a fandom organization that would not only perpetuate the concept of comics as an art form, but would also act as a sort of umbrella for all his ideas and projects, and those of others." The ACBFC's charter, "enthusiastically endorsed by members of fandom" detailed the Academy's intentions: formation of the Alley Awards, publication of The Comic Reader and "a directory of comic fans," to assist in establishing a yearly comics convention and to endorse a "code of fair practice in the selling and trading of comic books."

Bails introduced and attempted to popularize the term "panelologist" for comics fans and their hobby, implying a study of the panels which make up comics. Bails served as the Academy's first Executive Secretary, later passing his role on to fellow fan Paul Gambaccini (who termed himself "ExecSec2"), who later gave way to Dave Kaler. Under Kaler's leadership, the Academy produced three successful conventions in New York City during the summers of 1965–1967.

Despite a 1969 "Marvel Bullpen Bulletins" mention noting that the group "holds an annual poll to determine the most popular mags, writers and artists of the preceding year," and directing fans to obtain a ballot from future comics professional Mark Hanerfeld at 42-42 Colden Street in Flushing, New York ...," the Academy waned, "and it was disbanded for lack of interest by the decade's end."

==== The Alley Awards ====
The first comic book awards trace their origins to "a letter to Jerry dated October 25, 1961," by Roy Thomas, in which he suggested to Bails that Alter-Ego create its own awards to reward fandom's "favorite comic books in a number of categories" in a manner similar to the Oscars.

In the letter column of Fantastic Four #33 (1964), it is stated that the Association "elected Stan the best writer, and the best editor of the year! They've also voted the ol' F.F. and SPIDER-MAN the two best comic books of the year! Also -- what was their choice for the year's best annual? The FANTASTIC FOUR ANNUAL, natch!"

Initially suggested as 'The Alter-Ego Award,' the resulting idea was soon named 'The Alley Award', "named after Alley Oop" by Thomas "because surely a caveman had to be the earliest superhero chronologically." (Bill Schelly notes no one "bothered to ask the NEA Syndicate for permission to utilize V. T. Hamlin's comic strip character.")

The Alley Awards were tallied yearly for comics produced during the previous year, with the last year the awards were given out being 1969.

==== Convention forerunner ====
Between March 21 and March 22, 1964, the first annual "Alley Tally" was organized by Bails at his house with the purpose of counting "the Alley Award ballots for 1963." This became notable in retrospect as the first major gathering of comics fans, predating the earliest comic book conventions, which were held later in the year. Attendees included Ronn Foss, Don Glut, Chuck Moss, Don and Maggie Thompson, Mike Vosburg, and Grass Green.

Bill Schelly (among others) notes that the Alley Tally and "even larger fan meetings in Chicago . . . helped build momentum" for these earliest conventions, including the aforementioned "Academy Cons" held in New York in 1965–1967. Bails himself was "on the organizing committee" for the Detroit Triple Fan Fair, 1964. THE DTFF would continue sporadically through the 1970s under its initial format, though expanded; while primarily a comic convention, the event also gave balanced coverage to historic film showings (often running all night long for the convention's duration) and science-fiction literature, in a manner that provided a template for many future convention organizers—most of whom have yet to attain the same level of equal service to this sort of linked fan base.

=== CAPA-alpha ===
In October 1964, Bails released the first issue of comics' first dedicated amateur press association publication, CAPA-alpha.

Between 1963 and 1964, "new fanzines were popping up right and left . . . [as] a lot of fans were infected by the "publishing bug," many of them talented writers and artists." In an attempt to focus these emerging talents, and head off the over-abundance of "crud-zines" (poor quality fanzines), which seemed to equal in number their good quality counterparts, Bails adapted the long-standing practice of amateur press alliance (APAs) for comics, creating the first all-comics APA, "CAPA-alpha" (the first — e.g., 'alpha' — 'Comics A.P.A.').

This allowed the easy formulation of a fanzine, created through submissions by each of its fifty-strong membership, who could all contribute short submissions on a regular basis. Compiled in the regular APA mold by a 'central mailer' (in which role Bails first served), copies of the membership's individual submissions could then be collated and mailed out to everyone. "Now," explained fandom historian Bill Schelly, "fans could get into print and retain editorial control of their material, without publishing their own fanzine."

== Indices and reference materials ==
Bails also worked on and published extensive cross-referencing systems allowing researchers the ability to follow the published credits of Golden Age comic book creators. As this approach had never been used before, the data were later appended, and have since been adapted by a variety of comic price guides and comic book historians.

A "professor of science and technology," Bails "had a technical bent" that saw him embracing new forms of technology and novel ideas in his continued efforts within fandom. Among his ideas was "microfilming rare, hard-to-find Golden Age comics," which film could then be loaned/viewed rather than the tangible comics themselves, reducing considerably wear and tear. Alongside Jules Feiffer's Great Comic Book Heroes (1965), Bails' microfilm library was the major source of "substitutes for the real" comics themselves, which were rarely reprinted.

To accommodate readers who did not have access to a microfilm reader, Bails offered a reproduction service of "cover photographs, spanning most of the key #1 issues from the World War II era," in black & white for $2. These reproductions pre-dated by three decades the four volumes of comic book covers published as The Photo-Journal Guide to Comic Books by Ernie Gerber in the mid-1990s.

The lack of reference materials available to comics fans meant that much early fandom activity revolved around indexing various companies and individuals' output. A pioneer in this field, Bails worked with Howard Keltner, Raymond Miller and Fred Von Bernewitz (among others) to index various comics, detailing "what comics had been published, their contents, how many issues they ran, etc."

Naturally Bails' early efforts dealt with All-Star Comics and DC, in first his All-Star Index and then an Authoritative Index to DC Comics. With Howard Keltner in particular, Bails then compiled several extensive wider inventories of "Golden Age" comics, including The Collector's Guide to the First Heroic Age of Comics. A partial listing of Bails-involved indexes includes:

- The Authoritative Index to All-Star Comics
- The Collector's Guide to the First Heroic Age of Comics
- Howard Keltner's Index to Golden Age Comic Books
- The Authoritative Index to DC Comics
- The Panelologist presents: the Justice Society of America on Earth-Two
- The Panelologist presents: the Green Lantern Golden Age Index

Bails' friend and colleague Ray Bottorff Jr. recalls that Bails had "begun to create a comic book price guide, when a man named Bob Overstreet contacted him because he was doing the same thing." Bails' extensive notes "became a backbone to the Overstreet Comic Book Price Guide."

=== Who's Who ===
In addition to his work in comics indexing, Bails was also involved in the tabulating of information about the people involved in both comics and comics fandom. Described in the ACBFC charter, Who's Who in Comic Fandom was the first concerted effort to provide a centralized store of data on the ever-increasing number of comics fans. It was released in April 1964 by Bails and L. Lattanzi. The volume opened with Bails' chronologies of both early comics fandom and the "Second Heroic Age of Comics". later known as the Silver Age of Comic Books. The directory itself contained fan listings culled from Bails' master list of 1,600 names. Bails invited fans to contact each other, "make sure they [all] know about the Academy; help form a local Chapter [and] help Comic Fandom to grow!"

Bails also contributed to the following year's Guidebook to Comics Fandom, a brief guide to the major fanzines being published. He wrote an introductory essay on the collecting of comics and produced a brief timeline of fandom as well as a "truncated Golden Age index." In addition, he set out in print the "standard grading system for comics" which with some slight revisions "is still used today."

Bails and co-editor Hames Ware published Who's Who of American Comic Books in four volumes between 1973 and 1976, designed to document the careers of every person to have contributed to, or supported the publication of, original material in U.S. comic books since 1928.

==== Methodology ====
With many creators largely unknown before the advent of comics fans and fandom in the 1950s and 1960s, Bails was one of the earliest proponents of documenting these individuals' credits. He wrote to a large number of creators and was able to encourage many to share their recollections, credits and, in some cases, personal records to assist in the accuracy of his project.

A major part of the reference work was fan-identification of artistic styles and signature-spotting and recognition, which deductions often formed the basis for Bails' questions to creators, who could then offer corrections and additions. This included collecting and microfilming more than 500,000 comic book pages and contacting many hundreds of comic book professionals, asking them to fill out questionnaires about their careers.

After two subsequent editions, Bails focused on computerizing the data, ultimately embracing the internet through the medium of the online Who's Who "Bails Project" website. The online database also attempts to cover foreign creators, the small press and alternative publishers of comic books which have received U.S. distribution.

Members of Bails' "advisory board" for the Who's Who include Craig Delich, a long-time friend and teaching colleague of Bails and Ray Bottorff Jr., who also serves on the board of directors for the Grand Comics Database. A stroke late in Bails' life affected his vision and cut into his ability to pursue work on Who's Who, but until his death he was still adding hundreds of new records each week and consolidating and revising old records.

Bails also wrote introductions and forewords to a number of collections of Golden Age and Silver Age DC Comics books. In 1985, DC Comics named Bails as one of the honorees in the company's 50th anniversary publication Fifty Who Made DC Great.

== Personal life ==
Bails died in his sleep of a heart attack on November 23, 2006. He was 73 years old.
