= Comic Art Convention =

Defunct American comic book convention

- Status: Defunct
- Genre: Comics
- Locations: New York City (1968–1976, 1978–1983); Philadelphia (1977–1979)
- Country: United States
- Inaugurated: 1968; 58 years ago
- Most recent: 1983; 43 years ago
- Organizer: Phil Seuling

The Comic Art Convention (CAC) was an American comic book fan convention held annually New York City, New York, over Independence Day weekend from 1968 through 1983, except for 1977, when it was held in Philadelphia, Pennsylvania, and 1978 to 1979, when editions of the convention were held in both New York and Philadelphia. The first large-scale comics convention, and one of the largest gatherings of its kind until the Comic-Con International in San Diego, California, it grew into a major trade and fan convention. It was founded by Phil Seuling, a Brooklyn, New York City, teacher, who later developed the concept of comic-book direct marketing, which led to the rise to the modern comic book store.

The New York Comic Art Convention's growth in popularity coincided with the increasing media attention on comics that had been building since the mid-1960s, feeding off the then novel notions of comics being a subject worthy of serious critical study and collectibility.

== History ==
=== Antecedents ===
Circa 1961, enterprising fans including Jerry Bails, Shel Dorf, Bernie Bubnis, and future Marvel Comics editor-in-chief Roy Thomas began following the pattern of the long-established science fiction fandom by publishing fanzines, corresponding with one another and with comic-book editors (most notably DC Comics' Julius Schwartz), and eventually arranging informal and later professional, commercial conventions. Among the first were the 1964 Tri-State Con (a.k.a. the New York Comicon) and that same year's precursor to the Detroit Triple Fan Fair (officially established in 1965).

As Seuling described his convention's genesis, "In 1964, about a hundred people found themselves in a New York City union meeting hall, a large open room with wooden folding chairs, looking around at each other oddly, surprised, not really knowing what they were there for, a bit sheepish, waiting for whatever was going to take place to begin. ... It was the first comics convention ever [and t]hat one-day assembly ... grew step by step into an annual tradition in New York and then elsewhere."

In 1965, the Academy of Comic-Book Fans and Collectors, led by Dave Kaler, hosted a convention at New York's Broadway Central Hotel, continuing that tradition in 1966 and 1967. The so-called "Academy Cons" featured such industry professionals as Otto Binder, Bill Finger, Gardner Fox, Mort Weisinger, James Warren, Roy Thomas, Gil Kane, Stan Lee, Bill Everett, Carmine Infantino, and Julius Schwartz.

=== Seuling's shows ===
As Seuling told it, "In 1968, I became involved in [staging] my first convention." The 1968 show, officially known as the International Convention of Comic Book Art, was co-produced with SCARP, the short-lived Society for Comic Art Research and Preservation, Inc. Guests of honor at the 1968 show were Will Eisner and Burne Hogarth. Featured speakers included Stan Lee, Milton Caniff, Lee Falk, and Charles Biro. Professional guests included Neal Adams, Dan Adkins, Murphy Anderson, Dick Ayers, Vaughn Bodē, E. Nelson Bridwell, Nick Cardy, Gene Colan, Leonard Darvin, Sol Davidson, Arnold Drake, Creig Flessel, Woody Gelman, Dick Giordano, Archie Goodwin, Bill Harris, Larry Ivie, Jeff Jones, Gil Kane, Gray Morrow, Joe Orlando, Jerry Robinson, John Romita, Richard Sherry, Jerry Siegel, Leonard Starr, Jim Steranko, Roy Thomas, Sal Trapani, John Verpoorten, Al Williamson, and Wally Wood. Total attendance was recorded as 784.

The 1969 convention, the first official Comic Art Convention, was held Independence Day weekend at the Statler Hilton Hotel in New York City, and the guest of honor was Hal Foster. Admittance to the convention cost $3.50 for a three-day ticket, with daily passes at $1.50. Admittance was free with a hotel room rental, which cost $15-and-up per day.

The final three years of the 1961-1969 Alley Awards, sponsored by Alter Ego magazine and the Academy of Comic-Book Fans and Collectors, were presented at the Comic Art Convention. After the demise of the Alley, later years featured the Goethe Awards (later renamed the "Comic Fan Art Awards").

The 1971 show featured Guests of Honor Jerry Iger and Will Eisner, and their sale of hundreds of pages of original Golden Age comic book art, mostly from Fiction House (a prominent client of the Eisner & Iger comics packaging studio). As comics historian Robert Beerbohm remembers, "Iger & Eisner had brought in a few five-foot tall pallets of original comic book art, mainly Fiction House. Using a forklift. Many multi thousands of pages. The Lou Fine covers, etc., went early on for bigger bucks... [In] the last few hours they made the art $10 an inch."

In 1973, Seuling persuaded Dr. Fredric Wertham, author of the industry-changing 1954 book Seduction of the Innocent, to attend what would be Wertham's only panel with an audience of comics fans.

The 1974 show featured a panel on the role of women in comics, with Marie Severin, Flo Steinberg, Jean Thomas (sometime-collaborator with then-husband Roy Thomas), Linda Fite (writer of The Claws of the Cat), and fan representative Irene Vartanoff.

By 1984, as his comic-book distribution business occupied more time, and as other comics conventions, most notably in San Diego and Chicago, became larger, more prominent, and more commercial- rather than fan-driven, Seuling segued the Independence Day-centered Comic Art Convention into the smaller Manhattan Con, which took place in mid-June.

Seuling died unexpectedly in August 1984, and the Comic Art Convention/Manhattan Con died with him.

== Legacy ==
Program book featuring Swamp Thing art by Berni Wrightson (as he then spelled his first name).

The Comic Art Conventions provided the primary nexus for fans and the largely New York City-based industry during the Silver Age and the Bronze Age of comic books. As well, many of the Golden Age creators were still alive and in attendance at panels and for interviews, which helped lay the groundwork for the medium's historical scholarship.

The reputation of the Convention spread throughout fandom via an annual write-up published in The Buyer's Guide to Comics Fandom by columnist Murray Bishoff. Besides reporting on convention events, Bishoff also provided fans around the country with a benchmark market report by surveying attending dealers regarding what was selling and whether prices realized were above or below those quoted in the de facto standard, The Overstreet Comic Book Price Guide.

Will Eisner, creator of the Spirit in 1940, credited the 1971 Comic Art Con for his return to comics. In a 1983 interview with Seuling, he said, "I came back into the field because of you. I remember you calling me in New London, [Connecticut], where I was sitting there as chairman of the board of Croft Publishing Co. My secretary said, 'There's a Mr. Seuling on the phone and he's talking about a comics convention. What is that?' She said, 'I didn't know you were a cartoonist, Mr. Eisner.' 'Oh, yes,' I said, 'secretly; I'm a closet cartoonist.' I came down and was stunned at the existence of the whole world. ... That was a world that I had left, and I found it very exciting, very stimulating".

Eisner later elaborated about meeting underground comics creators and publishers, including Denis Kitchen

I went down to the convention, which was being held in one of the hotels in New York, and there was a group of guys with long hair and scraggly beards, who had been turning out what spun as literature, really popular 'gutter' literature if you will, but pure literature. And they were taking on illegal [sic] subject matter that no comics had ever dealt with before. ... I came away from that recognizing that a revolution had occurred then, a turning point in the history of this medium. ... I reasoned that the 13-year-old kids that I'd been writing to back in the 1940s were no longer 13-year-old kids, they were now 30, 40 years old. They would want something more than two heroes, two supermen, crashing against each other. I began working on a book that dealt with a subject that I felt had never been tried by comics before, and that was man's relationship with God. That was the book A Contract with God....

1974 program book featuring Joe Simon's original 1940 sketch of Captain America

== Successors ==
Following Seuling's death in 1984 and continuing until 1988, Creation Entertainment continued producing large annual conventions in New York City, usually taking place over the weekend following Thanksgiving (Creation had begun hosting New York shows in 1971, and sometimes put on as many as a half-dozen New York City shows per year). From 1993–1995, promoter Fred Greenberg hosted two Great Eastern Conventions annually at venues including the Jacob K. Javits Convention Center and the New York Coliseum. Other companies, including Dynamic Forces, held New York City conventions but all were on a smaller scale than the Seuling shows. Changes in the industry, popular culture, and the resurgent city itself since the troubled 1960s and '70s made large-scale comic-book conventions difficult to hold profitably. Jonah Weiland of ComicBookResources.com also noted that "...dealing with the various convention unions made it difficult for most groups to get a show off the ground."

In 1996, Greenberg, at a very late point, cancelled what had been advertised as a larger-than-usual Great Eastern Conventions show, which the fan press had suggested might herald a successor to the Comic Art Con. As a substitute event, promoter Michael Carbonaro and others on the spur of the moment mounted the first Big Apple Convention in the basement of Manhattan's Church of St. Paul the Apostle. These small shows nonetheless attracted many comics creators and pop-culture figures, and by 2000 the convention had moved to the Metropolitan Pavilion on West 18th Street in Manhattan, and by the mid-2000s were taking place at the Penn Plaza Pavilion at the Hotel Pennsylvania — the same location of the original Comic Art Conventions.

In 2002, the first MoCCA Art Festival, focused on alternative comics and the small press, was held at New York City’s Puck Building; it has been held annually since. In 2006, the first New York Comic Con was held in the Jacob K. Javits Convention Center; it also has been held annually since.

== Dates and locations ==
Conventions held in New York City unless otherwise noted.

- July 4–7, 1968: Statler Hilton Hotel, 33rd Street and Seventh Avenue — as International Convention of Comic Book Art
- July 4–6, 1969: Statler Hilton Hotel — Penn Top/Sky Top Rooms
- July 3–5, 1970: Statler Hilton Hotel
- July 2–4, 1971: Statler Hilton Hotel
- July 1–5, 1972: Statler Hilton Hotel
- July 4–8, 1973: Commodore Hotel, 42nd Street and Park Avenue
- July 4–8, 1974: Commodore Hotel
- July 3–7, 1975: Commodore Hotel
- July 2–6, 1976: McAlpin Hotel, 34th Street and Broadway
- July 1–5, 1977: Hotel Sheraton, Philadelphia, Pennsylvania (no New York con this year)
- 1978:
  - July 2–5: Americana Hotel, New York City
  - July 8–9: Philadelphia
- 1979:
  - June 30-July 1: Statler Hilton Hotel, New York City
  - July 14–15: Sheraton Hotel, Philadelphia
- July 4–6, 1980: Statler Hilton Hotel
- July 3–5, 1981: Statler Hilton Hotel
- July, 3-5, 1982: Sheraton Hotel, Seventh Ave. and 56th Street, New York City
- July 2–4, 1983: Sheraton Hotel, New York City — as International Science Fiction and Comic Art Convention (presentation of the Saturn Awards)

== See also ==
- Science fiction convention
