= Alley Award =

American series of comic book fan awards

- Awarded for: Excellence in the field of comic books
- Venue: Academy Con (1965–1967); Comic Art Convention (1968–1970)
- Country: United States of America
- Presented by: Alter Ego magazine / Academy of Comic Book Arts and Sciences
- First award: 1962
- Final award: 1970

The Alley Award was an American annual series of comic book fan awards, first presented in 1962 for comics published in 1961. Officially organized under the aegis of the Academy of Comic Book Arts and Sciences, the award shared close ties with the fanzine Alter Ego magazine. The Alley is the first known comic book fan award.

The Alley Awards were tallied for comic books produced during the previous year. The Alley statuette — a likeness of the comic strip character Alley Oop — was initially sculpted by Academy member Ron Foss out of redwood, from which "plaster duplications" were made to be handed out to the various winners.

== History ==
The Alley Award traces its origin to "a letter to Jerry dated October 25, 1961" by Roy Thomas, in which he suggested that Jerry Bails' fanzine Alter-Ego, which had debuted in March 1961, create an award for fandom's "favorite comic books in a number of categories".

Initially suggested as the "Alter-Ego Award", the name evolved into the Alley Award after comic strip caveman Alley Oop, since, as Thomas reasoned, "surely a caveman had to be the earliest superhero chronologically". Comics historian Bill Schelly notes that no one "bothered to ask the NEA [newspaper] syndicate for permission to utilize V. T. Hamlin's comic strip character".

By the awards' third year, the number of ballots received had become so overwhelming that Bails called for a fan get-together at which votes could be tabulated by group effort. This gathering of Midwestern fans, held in March 1964 at the Detroit-area home of Bails, was dubbed the "Alley Tally", and its success provided inspiration for the organizing of comic book fan conventions that began soon afterward.

Results of the voting were published in the comics fanzines On the Drawing Board / The Comic Reader The Alley Awards themselves were given out from 1962 to 1970 (for comics published 1961–1969, respectively), with comic strip awards added in 1967 (for calendar year 1966). The awards were presented at all three Academy Cons from 1965 to 1967. The final three years' awards were presented at Phil Seuling's New York Comic Art Convention.

After the dissolution of the Alleys, from 1971 to 1974 the Comic Art Convention presented the Goethe Awards/Comic Fan Art Awards.

== Winners ==
=== 1961 ===
- Best Regularly Published Comic Book - Justice League of America (DC Comics)
- Best Adventure Hero(ine) Having Own Comic Book - Green Lantern (DC Comics)
- Best Adventure Hero(ine) Not Having Own Comic Book - Hawkman (DC Comics)
- Best Supporting Character - Elongated Man (DC Comics)
- Best Cover - The Flash #123, "Flash of Two Worlds" (DC Comics)
- Best Single Issue - The Flash #123, "Flash of Two Worlds" [by Gardner Fox & Carmine Infantino] (DC Comics)
- Best Artist (Pencil or Ink) - Carmine Infantino
- Best Story - The Flash #123, "Flash of Two Worlds" (DC Comics)
- Best Adventure-Hero Group - Justice League of America (DC Comics)
- Hero or Heroine Most Worthy of Revival - The Spectre (DC Comics)
- Worst Comic Book Currently Published - Wonder Woman (DC Comics)

=== 1962 ===
- Best Comic Book of the Year - Fantastic Four (Marvel Comics)
- Best Editor of a Comics Group - Julius Schwartz (DC Comics)
- Best Script Writer - Gardner Fox
- Best Pencil Artist - Carmine Infantino
- Best Inker - Murphy Anderson
- Best Hero - Hawkman (DC Comics)
- Best Group of Heroes - Fantastic Four (Marvel Comics)
- Best Villain - Sub-Mariner (Fantastic Four) (Marvel Comics)
- Best Supporting Character - The Thing (Fantastic Four) (Marvel Comics)
- Best Short Story - "Origin of Spider-Man" by Stan Lee & Steve Ditko, Amazing Fantasy #15 (Marvel Comics)
- Best Book-Length Story - "The Planet that Came to a Standstill", by Gardner Fox & Carmine Infantino, Mystery in Space #75 (DC Comics)
- Best Single Comic Book Cover - The Brave and the Bold #42, by Joe Kubert (DC Comics)
- Comic Most in Need of Improvement - Batman (DC Comics)
- Hero/Heroine Most Worthy of Revival - The Spectre (DC Comics)

"Ama" (Fan) Division

- Comic Fanzines of 1961/62 - Alter-Ego, edited by Jerry Bails & Roy Thomas
- Special Projects - Index to All Star Comics, by Jerry Bails
- Articles - "The Light of Green Lantern", by Jerry Bails
- Features - "Profiles on Collectors", by Biljo White
- Strip - "Bestest League of America", by Roy Thomas
- Fiction - "The Reincarnation of The Spectre", by Roy Thomas

=== 1963 ===
Pro Categories

- Best Editor - Stan Lee (Marvel Comics)
- Best Writer - Stan Lee
- Best Artist - Carmine Infantino

Best Comics Categories

- Adventure Hero - The Amazing Spider-Man (Marvel Comics)
- General Fantasy - Strange Adventures (DC Comics)
- Mundane Fiction - Sgt. Fury and His Howling Commandos (Marvel Comics)
- Humorous - Uncle Scrooge (Western Publishing)
- Favorite Short Story - "The Human Torch Meets Captain America", by Stan Lee & Jack Kirby, Strange Tales #114 (Marvel Comics)
- Favorite Annual - Fantastic Four Annual #1 (Marvel Comics)
- Favorite Novel - "Crisis on Earths 1 and 2", by Gardner Fox & Mike Sekowsky, Justice League of America #21-22 (DC Comics)
- Top Hero - Spider-Man (Marvel Comics)
- Top Group - The Fantastic Four (Marvel Comics)
- Top Supporting Character - The Thing (Fantastic Four) (Marvel Comics)
- Top Supporting Character - The Sub-Mariner (Fantastic Four) (Marvel Comics)
- Strip Favored for Revival - Doctor Fate (DC Comics)

Amateur Division (on a scale of 1-5 points)

- Article - "Minute Movies", by Hal Lynch & Vern Coriell (Comic Art #4) - 4.31 points
- Illustrated Strip - "The Eclipse", by Drury Moroz & Ron Foss (Alter-Ego #5) - 4.22 points
- Fanzine Fiction - "The Black Panther", by John Wright (Komix #2) - 4.06 points
- Single Illustration - Cover, Star-Studded Comics #2, by Buddy Saunders - 4.28 points
- Fan Project - Authoritative Index to DC Comics, by Howard Keltner & Jerry Bails - 4.50 points
- Fan Artist - Ron Foss - 4.19 points
- Fan Writer - Jerry Bails - 4.40 points
- Comics Fanzine - The Comic Reader #15-20, by Jerry Bails - 4.53 points

Write-In Categories

- Strip that Should be Improved - Justice League of America (DC Comics)
- Crossover of DC Heroes for The Brave and the Bold - Hawkman & the Flash (DC Comics)
- Artist Preferred on Sea Devils - Joe Kubert (DC Comics)
- Artist Preferred on Justice League of America - Murphy Anderson (DC Comics)
- Comic Displaying Best Interior Color Work - Mystery in Space (DC Comics)

=== 1964 ===
Pro Categories

- Best Adventure Hero Comic Book - The Amazing Spider-Man (Marvel Comics)
- Best Regularly Published Fantasy Comic - Forbidden Worlds (American Comics Group)
- Best Humorous Comic Book - Herbie
- Best Miscellaneous Fiction - Sgt. Fury and His Howling Commandos (Marvel Comics)
- Best Editor - Stan Lee (Marvel Comics)
- Best Writer - Stan Lee
- Best Pencil Artist - Carmine Infantino
- Best Inking Artist - Murphy Anderson
- Best Comic Book Cover - Detective Comics #329 (DC Comics)
- Best Short Story - "Doorway to the Unknown", by John Broome & Carmine Infantino, The Flash #148 (DC Comics)
- Best Novel - "Captain America Joins the Avengers", by Stan Lee & Jack Kirby, from The Avengers #4 (Marvel Comics)
- Best Giant Comic - The Amazing Spider-Man Annual #1 (Marvel Comics)
- Comic Regularly Displaying Best Color Work - Magnus, Robot Fighter (Gold Key Comics)
- Worst Regularly Published Comic - Wonder Woman
- Best Hero - Spider-Man
- Best Supporting Character - The Thing (Fantastic Four) (Marvel Comics)
- Best Villain - Doctor Doom (Fantastic Four (Marvel Comics)
- Best Group of Characters - The Fantastic Four (Marvel Comics)
- Best New Strip or Book - Captain America, by Stan Lee & Jack Kirby, in Tales of Suspense (Marvel Comics)
- Strip Most Desired for Revival - The Spectre (DC Comics)

Fan Categories (on a scale of 1-5 points)

- Best Article in a Fanzine - (tie) "Lee", by Rick Weingroff (4.21 points); "One Man's Family", by Roy Thomas (4.21 points)
- Best Regular Fanzine Feature - "Information Center", by Bob Jennings (4.17 points)
- Best Fan Comic Strip - Adam Link, by Eando Binder, Bill Spicer and D. Bruce Berry (4.61 points)
- Best Ditto/Mimeo Cover - Batmania #1, by Biljo White (4.46 points)
- Best Cover (Other Reproduction) - Alter-Ego #7, by Biljo White (4.61 points)
- Best Fan Fiction - "Nemesis of Evil", by Victor Baron (4.23 points)
- Best Fan Project - Who's Who and Supplement, by Jerry Bails & Larry Lattanzi (4.32 points)
- Best Fanzine - Alter-Ego #7, by Roy Thomas (4.67 points)

=== 1965 ===
Pro Categories

- Best Adventure Hero Comic Book - The Amazing Spider-Man (Marvel Comics)
- Best Regularly Published Fantasy Comic - Strange Adventures (DC Comics)
- Best Humor Comic Book - Herbie
- Best Miscellaneous Fiction - Sgt. Fury and His Howling Commandos (Marvel Comics)
- Best Editor - Stan Lee (Marvel Comics)
- Best Writer - Stan Lee
- Best Pencil Artist - Wally Wood
- Best Inking Artist - Murphy Anderson
- Best Comic Book Cover - The Brave and the Bold #61 (DC Comics)
- Best Short Story - The Origin of the Red Skull, by Stan Lee & Jack Kirby, Tales of Suspense #66 (Marvel Comics)
- Best Giant Comic - T.H.U.N.D.E.R. Agents #1, by Len Brown, Wally Wood, Reed Crandall, Gil Kane, George Tuska, Mike Sekowsky (Tower Comics)
- Best Novel - "Solomon Grundy Goes on a Rampage" Showcase #55, by Gardner Fox & Murphy Anderson (DC Comics)
- Comic Regularly Displaying Best Color Work - Magnus, Robot Fighter (Gold Key Comics)
- Comic Most Needing Improvement - Blue Beetle (Charlton Comics)
- Best Hero - Spider-Man (Marvel Comics)
- Best Supporting Character - The Thing (Fantastic Four) (Marvel Comics)
- Best Villain - Doctor Doom (Fantastic Four) (Marvel Comics)
- Best Group - The Fantastic Four (Marvel Comics)
- Best New Strip or Book - T.H.U.N.D.E.R. Agents, by Len Brown & Wally Wood (Tower Comics)
- Best Revived Hero - Doctor Fate (DC Comics)
- Strip or Book Most Desired for Revival - Justice Society of America (DC Comics)

Fan Categories (on a scale of 1-5 points)

- Best Article - "With Comics Down Under", by John Ryan (4.51 points)
- Best Regular Feature - "On the Drawing Board", by Glen Johnson & Derrill Rothermich (4.68 points)
- Best Fan Comic Strip - "The End of Bukawai", Fantasy Illustrated #3 (4.48 points)
- Best Ditto/Mimeo Cover - Batmania #5, by Biljo White (4.38 points)
- Best Cover (Other Reproduction) - Alter-Ego #8, by Biljo White (4.57 points)
- Best Fan Fiction - "Powerman vs. the Blue Barrier", by George R. R. Martin (4.29 points)
- Best Fan Project - New York Comicon, by Dave Kaler (4.63 points)
- Best Fanzine - Alter-Ego #8, by Roy Thomas (4.71 points)

=== 1966 ===
Best Comic Magazine Section

- Adventure Book with the Main Character in the Title - The Amazing Spider-Man (Marvel Comics)
- Multi-Feature Title - Tales of Suspense (Marvel Comics)
- Super Hero Group Title - Fantastic Four (Marvel Comics)
- Normal Group Adventure Title - M.A.R.S. Patrol (Gold Key Comics)
- Fantasy/SF/Supernatural Title - Strange Adventures (DC Comics)
- Western Title - Kid Colt, Outlaw (Marvel Comics)
- War Title - Sgt. Fury and his Howling Commandos (Marvel Comics)
- Humor Title: Teenage - Archie (Archie Comics)
- Humor Title: Costumed - Inferior Five (DC Comics)
- Humor Title: Juvenile - Uncle Scrooge (Western Publishing)
- All-Reprint Title - The Spirit (Harvey Comics)
- Combination New & Reprint Material Title - Fantastic Four Annual (Marvel Comics)

Best Professional Work

- Editor - Stan Lee (Marvel Comics)
- Writer - Stan Lee
- Pencil Work - Al Williamson
- Inking Work - Wally Wood
- Cover - Flash Gordon #1, by Al Williamson (King Comics)
- Coloring - Flash Gordon (King Comics)
- Best Full-Length Story - "How Green was My Goblin", by Stan Lee & John Romita Sr., The Amazing Spider-Man #39 (Marvel Comics)
- Feature Story - "Return to Mongo", by Al Williamson, Flash Gordon #1 (King Comics)
- Regular Short Feature - "Tales of Asgard" by Stan Lee & Jack Kirby, in The Mighty Thor (Marvel Comics)
- Hall of Fame - n.a.
- Popularity Poll - n.a.

Newspaper Strip Section

- Best Adventure Strip - The Phantom, by Lee Falk
- Best Human Interest Strip - On Stage (also known as Mary Perkins, On Stage), by Leonard Starr
- Best Humor Strip - Peanuts, by Charles Schulz
- Best Humor Panel - Dennis the Menace, by Hank Ketcham
- Best Miscellaneous Strip - Feiffer, by Jules Feiffer
- Hall of Fame Award - Flash Gordon, by Alex Raymond
- Best All-Time Great Comic Strip - Flash Gordon, by Alex Raymond

Fan Activity Section

- Best All-Article Fanzine - (tie) Batmania and TNT/Slam-Bang
- Best All-Comics Fanzine - Odd
- Best All-Fiction Fanzine - Batwing
- Best Article/Comic Fanzine - Fantasy Illustrated
- Best Fiction/Comic Fanzine - Comic Art, by Don & Maggie Thompson
- Best Article/Fiction Fanzine - n.a.
- Best Fannish One-Shot - The Spirit (reprints), by Ed Aprill
- Best Article on Comic Book Material - "Quality Comics Group"
- Best Article on Newspaper Strips - "Pride of the Navy"
- Best Regular Fan Column - "What's News", by Dave Kaler
- Best Fan Fiction - "White Dragon Strikes"
- Best Fan Comic Strip - "Xal-Kor", by Richard "Grass" Green
- Best Fan Artist - Richard "Grass" Green
- Best Comic Strip Writer - Richard "Grass" Green
- Best Fan Project - Ed Aprill's reprints
- Best Newsletter - Dateline: Comicdom

=== 1967 ===
Best Comic Magazine Section

- Adventure Book with the Main Character in the Title - The Amazing Spider-Man (Marvel Comics)
- Adventure Hero Title with One or More Characters in Own Strip - Strange Tales (Marvel Comics)
- Super Hero Group Title - Fantastic Four (Marvel Comics)
- Non-Super-Powered Group Title - Challengers of the Unknown (DC Comics)
- Fantasy/SF/Supernatural Title - The Many Ghosts of Dr. Graves (Charlton Comics)
- Western Title - Ghost Rider (Marvel Comics)
- War Title - Sgt. Fury and his Howling Commandos (Marvel Comics)
- Humor Title: Teenage - Archie (Archie Comics)
- Humor Title: Costumed - Not Brand Echh (Marvel Comics)
- Humor Title: Juvenile - Uncle Scrooge (Western Publishing)
- All-Reprint Title - Fantasy Masterpieces (Marvel Comics)
- Combination New & Reprint Material Title - Marvel Super-Heroes (Marvel Comics)

Best Professional Work

- Editor - Stan Lee (Marvel Comics)
- Writer - Stan Lee
- Pencil Artist - Jack Kirby
- Inking Artist - Joe Sinnott
- Cover - Strange Adventures #207, by Neal Adams (DC Comics)
- Coloring - Magnus, Robot Fighter (Gold Key Comics)
- Full-Length Story - "Who's Been Lying in My Grave?", by Arnold Drake & Carmine Infantino, Strange Adventures #205 (DC Comics)
- Feature Story - "Lost Continent of Mongo" by Archie Goodwin & Al Williamson, Flash Gordon #4 (King Comics)
- Regular Short Feature - (tie) "Tales of Asgard" and "Tales of the Inhumans", both by Stan Lee & Jack Kirby, in The Mighty Thor (Marvel Comics)
- Hall of Fame - The Spirit, by Will Eisner

Popularity Poll

- Best Costumed or Powered Hero - Spider-Man (Marvel Comics)
- Best Normal Adventure Hero - Nick Fury, Agent of S.H.I.E.L.D. (Marvel Comics)
- Best Super-Powered Group - Fantastic Four (Marvel Comics)
- Best Normal Adventure Group - Challengers of the Unknown (DC Comics)
- Best Male Normal Supporting Character - J. Jonah Jameson (The Amazing Spider-Man) (Marvel Comics)
- Best Female Normal Supporting Character - Mary Jane Watson (The Amazing Spider-Man) (Marvel Comics)
- Best Villain - Doctor Doom (Fantastic Four) (Marvel Comics)
- Best New Strip - "Deadman", by Arnold Drake & Carmine Infantino, in Strange Adventures (DC Comics)
- Best Revived Strip - "Blue Beetle" (Charlton Comics)
- Strip Most Needing Improvement - "Batman" (DC Comics)
- Strip Most Desired for Revival - "Adam Strange" (DC Comics)

Newspaper Strip Section

- Best Adventure Strip - Prince Valiant, by Hal Foster
- Best Human Interest Strip - On Stage (also known as Mary Perkins, On Stage), by Leonard Starr
- Best Humor Strip - Peanuts, by Charles Schulz
- Best Humor Panel - Dennis the Menace, by Hank Ketcham
- Best Miscellaneous Strip - Ripley's Believe It or Not
- Hall of Fame Award - Flash Gordon, by Alex Raymond

Fan Activity Section

- Best All-Article Fanzine - (tie) Batmania and Gosh Wow
- Best All-Strip Fanzine - Star-Studded Comics
- Best All-Fiction Fanzine - Stories of Suspense
- Best Article/Strip Fanzine - Fantasy Illustrated
- Best Fiction/Strip Fanzine - Star-Studded Comics
- Best Article/Fiction Fanzine - (tie) Gosh Wow and Huh!
- Best Fannish One-Shot - Fandom Annual
- Best Article on Comic Book Material - "Blue Bolt and Gang" (Gosh Wow #1)
- Best Article on Comic Strip Material - "Gully Foyle" (Star-Studded Comics #11)
- Best Regular Fan Column - "What's News", by Dave Kaler
- Best Fan Fiction - "Nightwalker", by Larry Brody (Gosh Wow #1)
- Best Fan Comic Strip - "Xal-Kor", by Richard "Grass" Green
- Best Fan Artist - George Metzger
- Best Comic Strip Writer - Larry Herndon
- Best Fan Project - 1967 South-Western Con
- Best Newsletter - On the Drawing Board, by Bob Schoenfeld

=== 1968 ===
Comic Magazine Section

- Best Adventure Title - Winner: Fantastic Four; 2nd place: The Amazing Spider-Man (Marvel Comics)
- Best Fantasy/SF/Supernatural Title - Doctor Strange (Marvel Comics)
- Best Western Title - Bat Lash (Dc Comics)
- Best War Title - Sgt. Fury and his Howling Commandos (Marvel Comics)
- Best Humor Title - Not Brand Echh (Marvel Comics)
- Best Romance Title - Millie the Model (Marvel Comics)
- Best Reprint Title - Marvel Super-Heroes (Marvel Comics)

Professional Work

- Best Editor - Stan Lee
- Best Writer - Winner: Stan Lee; 2nd place: Roy Thomas
- Best Pencil Artist - Winner: Jim Steranko; 2nd place: Jack Kirby
- Best Inking Artist - Winner: Joe Sinnott; 2nd place: Wally Wood
- Best Cover - Nick Fury, Agent of S.H.I.E.L.D. #6, by Jim Steranko (Marvel Comics)
- Best Full-Length Story - (tie) "Track of the Hook", by Bob Haney & Neal Adams, The Brave and the Bold #79 (DC Comics); "Origin of the Silver Surfer", by Stan Lee & John Buscema, The Silver Surfer #1 (Marvel Comics)
- Best Feature Story - "Today Earth Died", by Jim Steranko, Strange Tales #168 (Marvel Comics)
- Best Regular Short Feature - "Tales of the Inhumans", by Stan Lee & Jack Kirby, in The Mighty Thor (Marvel Comics)
- Hall of Fame - Fantastic Four, by Stan Lee & Jack Kirby; Nick Fury, Agent of S.H.I.E.L.D., by Jim Steranko (Marvel Comics)

Popularity Poll

- Best Adventure Hero Strip - The Amazing Spider-Man (Marvel Comics)
- Best Adventure Group Strip - Fantastic Four (Marvel Comics)
- Best Supporting Character - J. Jonah Jameson (The Amazing Spider-Man) (Marvel Comics)
- Best Villain - Doctor Doom (Fantastic Four) (Marvel Comics)
- Best New Strip - The Silver Surfer by Stan Lee & John Buscema (Marvel Comics)
- Strip Most Needing Improvement - X-Men (Marvel Comics)
- Strip Most Desired for Revival - "Adam Strange" (DC Comics)

Newspaper Strip Section

- Best Adventure Strip - Prince Valiant, by Hal Foster
- Best Human Interest Strip - On Stage (also known as Mary Perkins, On Stage), by Leonard Starr
- Best Humor Strip - Peanuts, by Charles Schulz
- Best Humor Panel - Dennis the Menace, by Hank Ketcham
- Best Miscellaneous Strip - Feiffer, by Jules Feiffer
- Hall of Fame - Peanuts, by Charles Schulz

Fan Activity Section

- Best Limited Reproduction Fanzine - Concussion
- Best Unlimited Reproduction Fanzine - Graphic Story Magazine
- Best Fan Artist - John Fantucchio
- Best Comic Strip Writer - Larry Herndon
- Best Fan Project - The Alley Awards

=== 1969 ===
Best Comic Magazine Section

- Best Adventure Title - Winner: Fantastic Four (Marvel Comics)
- Best Fantasy/SF/Supernatural Title - Doctor Strange (Marvel Comics)
- Best Western Title - Bat Lash (DC Comics)
- Best War Title - Star Spangled War Stories (DC Comics)
- Best Humor Title - Archie (Archie Comics)
- Best Romance Title - Young Love (DC Comics)
- Best Reprint Title - Marvel Super-Heroes (Marvel Comics)

Professional Work

- Best Editor - Dick Giordano (DC Comics)
- Best Writer - Roy Thomas
- Best Pencil Artist - Neal Adams
- Best Inking Artist - Tom Palmer
- Best Cover - Captain America #113, by Jim Steranko
- Best Full-Length Story - "...And Who Shall Mourn for Him?", by Stan Lee, John Buscema & Sal Buscema, The Silver Surfer #5 (Marvel Comics)
- Best Feature Story - "At the Stroke of Midnight", by Jim Steranko, Tower of Shadows #1 (Marvel Comics)
- Hall of Fame - "Deadman", by Neal Adams (DC Comics)

Special Awards

- Carmine Infantino, "who exemplifies the spirit of innovation and inventiveness in the field of comic art".
- Joe Kubert, "for the cinematic storytelling techniques and the exciting and dramatic style he has brought to the field of comic art".
- Neal Adams, "for the new perspective and dynamic vibrance he has brought to the field of comic art".

Popularity Poll

- Best Adventure Hero Strip - The Amazing Spider-Man (Marvel Comics)
- Best Adventure Group Strip - Fantastic Four (Marvel Comics)
- Best Fantasy/Mystery Character — Doctor Strange
- Best Supporting Character - Rick Jones (The Incredible Hulk, The Avengers, and Captain America) (Marvel Comics)
- Best Villain - Doctor Doom (Fantastic Four) (Marvel Comics)
- Strip Most Needing Improvement - Superman (DC Comics)

Newspaper Strip Section

- Best Adventure or Human Interest Strip - Prince Valiant, by Hal Foster
- Best Humor Strip or Panel - Peanuts, by Charles Schulz
- Hall of Fame - Tarzan, by Burne Hogarth

Fan Activity Section

- Best Limited Reproduction Fanzine - Newfangles by Don & Maggie Thompson
- Best Unlimited Reproduction Fanzine - The Comic Reader
- Best Fan Artist - John Fantucchio
- Best Comic Strip Writer - Mark Hanerfeld
- Best Fan Project - 1969 New York ComiCon

== See also ==
- Bill Finger Award
- Eagle Award
- Eisner Award
- Harvey Award
- Inkpot Award
- Kirby Award
- National Comics Award
- Russ Manning Award
- Shazam Award
