= Academy of Comic-Book Fans and Collectors =

First official organization of American comic book enthusiasts and historians

- Formation: 1961/1962
- Dissolved: 1970
- Type: Comics organization
- Members: 2,000 (1965)
- Executive Secretary: Jerry Bails (c. 1961–1964); Paul Gambaccini (1964–1965); Dave Kaler (1965–1968); Mark Hanerfeld (1968–1970)
- Affiliations: Alley Awards; Academy Con

The Academy of Comic-Book Fans and Collectors (ACBFC) was the first official organization of comic book enthusiasts and historians. Active during the 1960s, the ACBFC was established by Jerry Bails, the "father of comics fandom". A vital player in the development of comics fandom, the ACBFC brought fans of the medium together, administered the first industry awards (the Alley Awards), and assisted in the establishment of the first comic book fan conventions.

== History ==
=== Origins and the Alley Awards ===
The idea of the academy was inspired by Bails' friend and fellow enthusiast Roy Thomas, who felt a comics-industry version of the Academy of Motion Picture Arts and Sciences would be an effective way "to emphasize the seriousness of comics fans about their hobby". Bails further liked "the idea of a fandom organization that would not only perpetuate the concept of comics as an art form, but would also act as a sort of umbrella for all his ideas and projects, and those of others". In short order — 1961 or 1962 — the Academy of Comic-Book Arts and Sciences was established. Bails served as the academy's first executive secretary, which had an initial roster of about twenty members.

The academy's first order of business was to administer the Alley Awards, which traced their origin to "a letter to Jerry dated October 25, 1961", by Thomas, in which he suggested to Bails that his fanzine Alter-Ego create its own awards to reward fandom's "favorite comic books in a number of categories" in a manner similar to the Oscars. Initially suggested as "The Alter-Ego Award", the resulting idea was soon named "The Alley Award", "named after V. T. Hamlin's Alley Oop" by Thomas "because surely a caveman had to be the earliest superhero chronologically". The first Alley Awards, given for the calendar year 1961, were reported in Alter Ego #4 (Oct. 1962).

=== Ratification ===
In 1963 Bails renamed the organization (which now had a membership of 90) the Academy of Comic-Book Fans and Collectors upon ratification of its charter, with these goals:

- conduct and administer the Alley Awards
- publish the comics news fanzine The Comic Reader
- endorse a "code of fair practice in the selling and trading of comic books"
- publish "a directory of comic fans" in the hopes of building local chapters
- endorse other fan organizations
- assist in establishing a yearly comics convention, and encourage industry professionals to participate

Forum was name of the ACBFC journal, the first issue of which was published in October 1964 out of South Bend, Indiana.

=== Alley Talley ===
On March 21–22, 1964, the first annual "Alley Tally" by ACBFC members was organized by Bails at his house in Detroit, with the purpose of counting "the Alley Award ballots for 1963". This became notable in retrospect as the first major gathering of comics fans, predating the earliest comic book conventions, which were held later in the year. Attendees included Ronn Foss, Don Glut, Don and Maggie Thompson, Mike Vosburg, and Grass Green. Comics historian Bill Schelly notes that the Alley Tally and "even larger fan meetings in Chicago . . . helped build momentum" for these earliest conventions. Bails himself was "on the organizing committee" for the Detroit Triple Fan Fair, held in 1965.

At the end of 1964, Bails passed on his role as executive secretary to fellow fan Paul Gambaccini (who termed himself "ExecSec2").

=== Academy Con ===
By 1965, the title of ACBFC Executive Secretary had passed to Dave Kaler and the academy had a membership of 2,000. Under Kaler's leadership, the academy produced three successful "Academy Con" comic book conventions in New York City during the summers of 1965–1967, attracting industry professionals such as Otto Binder, Bill Finger, Gardner Fox, Mort Weisinger, James Warren, Roy Thomas, Gil Kane, Stan Lee, Bill Everett, Carmine Infantino, and Julius Schwartz.

Kaler planned another Academy Con for the 1968 Thanksgiving weekend, but it never came to pass, possibly because of the successful first iteration of Phil Seuling's Comic Art Convention (a.k.a. the "International Convention of Comic Book Art"), which took place in New York City in the summer of 1968.

=== Decline and demise ===
By 1968, comics fandom — including annual conventions being held in New York, Detroit, St. Louis, and the Southwest — had become well established, and the academy's mission had been essentially fulfilled. In early 1968, due to a number of factors, Executive Secretary Kaler left, and Academy member Maggie Thompson declared the ACBFC "moribund". A 1969 mention in "Marvel Bullpen Bulletins" may have helped revive interest temporarily — it noted that the group "holds an annual poll to determine the most popular mags, writers and artists of the preceding year" (referring to the Alley Awards) and directed fans to obtain a ballot from then ACBFC executive secretary (and future comics professional) Mark Hanerfeld (who resided in Flushing, New York). Nonetheless, the academy waned, "and it was disbanded for lack of interest by the decade's end". 1970 was also the final year of the Alley Awards (awarded for calendar year 1969).

The Comic Reader, meanwhile, became "a mainstay of fandom", continuing as a (generally) monthly magazine under a succession of editors (including Hanerfeld and Paul Levitz), before being taken over in 1973 by Street Enterprises, which published the magazine until the mid-1980s.

== See also ==
- Academy of Comic Book Arts
