= Mark Hanerfeld =

American writer and editor in the comic book industry (1944–2000)

- Born: 1944 New York City, New York, U.S.
- Died: January 4, 2000 (aged 55–56)
- Areas: Writer, Editor
- Pseudonyms: Felton Marcus; Charles Nussbaum
- Notable works: Co-creator of Abel; The Wonderful World of Comics column Executive Secretary, Academy of Comic-Book Fans and Collectors (1968–1970)
- Awards: 1969 Alley Award for Best Comic Strip Writer (Fan Activity Section)

Mark Hanerfeld (1944–January 4, 2000) was an American writer and editor in the comic book industry. Starting out in the world of comics fandom, Hanerfeld is most well known for co-creating Abel, the "host" of the DC Comics horror comics anthology House of Secrets, as well as being the model for the character's appearance.

== Biography ==
=== Early life ===
Hanerfeld, a New Yorker, graduated from the High School of Music & Art.

=== Fandom ===
Hanerfeld started out in the world of comics fandom, first by writing to various DC comic book letter columns (with his first letter being printed in Justice League of America in 1961). Forming a relationship with top editor Julius Schwartz, Hanerfeld began visiting the DC offices. Hanerfeld attended DC's Thursday office tours regularly in the summer of 1967 alongside other fans that would go on to work at DC (some of whom he had befriended during the 1965 "Academy Con") including Marv Wolfman, Len Wein, Gerry Conway, and Steve Mitchell. Hanerfeld became such a constant on the DC Thursday tours that eventually the company let him begin leading them.

Meanwhile, Hanerfeld was immersed in the world of comics fanzines, first compiling the news section of The Comic Reader (TCR), called "On the Drawing Board." He took over as editor of TCR in 1968, while also becoming Executive Secretary of the Academy of Comic-Book Fans and Collectors (ACBFC). Doing double-duty was apparently too much for Hanerfeld: by mid-1969 he was having trouble maintaining a consistent publication schedule for TCR and, despite winning a 1969 Alley Award, by early 1970 the fanzine was no longer being published. The ACBFC, meanwhile, went defunct in mid-1969.

=== Professional comics career ===
==== DC Comics ====
In 1968, Hanerfeld began writing columns for The Wonderful World of Comics (WWC), and Fact Files, filler text features that appeared in select DC Comics titles. During the period 1968–1970, Hanerfeld wrote most of the WWC columns, which were probably inspired by Marvel's Bullpen Bulletins; the WWC columns provided insight into various elements of the comics world, from creator biographies to insider info on company sales and publishing decisions to the world of comics fanzines and the burgeoning comic convention scene. Fact File pieces were usually one-page recaps of the careers of various DC heroes.

In 1969, DC editor Joe Orlando created the design for Abel, based on Hanerfeld:

I started out basing it on the biblical Cain and Abel but then I turned to the people that were around me. It's just a writer's trick to take people's personalities and inject them into your characters. Mark stuttered when he got nervous. He was short and heavy so Abel was short and heavy. Abel was a good counterpoint to Cain who was tall and thin.

Hanerfeld and artist Bill Draut then created the first story featuring Abel, in DC Special #4 (July–Sept. 1969); Abel soon became the host of House of Secrets. During the period 1969 to 1974, Hanerfeld also wrote stories for such DC titles as The Spectre, Phantom Stranger, and Justice League of America.

In the summer of 1970, Hanerfeld — on his own dime — attended the Golden State Comic-Con, where he enthusiastically promoted DC's line of titles. Upon his return, he encouraged fellow East Coast comics industry figures to attend future editions of what became San Diego Comic-Con.

Hanerfeld was officially at DC in the period 1971–1973, serving as an assistant editor under DC vice president Joe Orlando. In that role, he also served as the DC librarian.

==== Marvel Comics ====
From 1974 to 1987, Hanerfeld work on promotional tie-ins for Marvel Comics, producing minicomics featuring Captain America, the Hulk, Spider-Man, and Tarzan advertising Aurora models, Pez, 7-Eleven, and bubble gum.

Throughout the 1980s, he helped coordinate Marvel reprints for the company's Marvel UK line. He left comics after the 1980s.

== Personal life and death ==
Hanerfeld died of heart failure in January 2000 after a period of ill health. He was commemorated at the 2000 Harvey Award ceremony at the Pittsburgh Comicon.

== Other appearances ==
Hanerfeld appeared as a metafictional character in Batman #237 (December 1971). Written by Dennis O'Neil and illustrated by Neal Adams, the story featured several comics creators appearing and interacting with Batman and Robin at the Rutland Halloween Parade in Rutland, Vermont.

He also appeared in a photograph in Elvira's House of Mystery #4 (June 1986).

== Bibliography ==
=== Comics ===
- "Shadow Show," in The Spectre #9 (Mar-Apr 1969)
- "Footsteps of Disaster," in The Spectre #10 (May-Jun 1969)
- "Hit and Run!", in The Spectre #10 (May-Jun 1969)
- "How Much Can a Guy Take?," in The Spectre #10 (May-Jun 1969)
- "Will the Real Killer Please Rise?", in The Spectre #10 (May-Jun 1969)
- untitled ["13 Shock-Ending Stories 13"], DC Special #4 (Jul-Sep 1969) — Framing sequence running throughout the book where each named character takes turns telling stories to try and scare the children, with the final story being told by the Phantom Stranger; first appearance of Abel
- "A Face in the Crowd!", The Witching Hour (DC, 1969 series) #6 (December 1969 – January 1970) — featuring the Three Witches
- "The Power," in The Phantom Stranger #20 (Jul-Aug 1972)
- "The Return of Anakronus!", Justice League of America #114 (Nov-Dec 1974) — printed credits read "Story by: Len Wein, aided & abetted by: Felton Marcus"

=== DC filler pages pieces ===
==== The Wonderful World of Comics ====
The Wonderful World of Comics articles appeared in select DC titles with cover dates spanning the periods notated.

- Aug 1968 "The Inquiring Fanatic: Whatever Happened to the Guy Who Us'ta Draw The Flash, or, Carmine WHO???" — humorous profile of Carmine Infantino
- Aug–Sep 1968 "Fan or Reader" — how to determine if you are a true comics fan or just an occasional reader. Also includes plug for the Bat Lash story by (Sergio Aragonés and Nick Cardy) in Showcase #76.
- Sep 1968 "Fanzine Review; Geek Sneak Peek" — plugs for comics fanzine Star-Studded Comics and Joe Simon's Brother Power the Geek title
- Nov 1968 "The Naming of Names; Con Game" — Bill Finger tells how the names Bruce Wayne, Dick Grayson, and Alan Scott came to be
- Oct–Nov 1968 "#5: Joe Kubert Is a Grand Old Name!" — profile of Joe Kubert; plugs for new titles Angel and the Ape and DC Special.
- Nov–Dec 1968 "#6: What's in a Fanzine" — definitions of various types of comics fanzines; plugs for The Comic Crusader and Fandom Calling.
- Jan–Feb 1969 "#7: Who Ever Heard of Jay Scott Pike!?!" — profile of Jay Scott Pike and his new character, Dolphin; news about the 1968 edition of Academy Con (which never came to pass)
- Jan–Feb 1969 "#8: What Makes DC Run?" — information about the colorists, letterers, and production people at DC Comics
- Feb–Mar 1969 "#10: Fandom Picks the Winners; Collector's Item" — information about the Alley Awards, some rare DC collectible comics, and letters from readers
- May 1969 "#11: DC Stars of Stage, Screen, Radio, and Television" — a rundown of various radio, movie serial, film, and television adaptations of DC characters
- Jul–Aug 1969 "Additions and Corrections" — questions and answers about DC's characters and creators
- Nov–Dec 1969 "Test Your 'Golden Age' I.Q." — written by E. Nelson Bridwell; Golden Age of Comic Books quiz with 20 questions and answers
- Dec 1969-Jan 1970 "Meet Murphy Anderson!" — lengthy profile of Murphy Anderson

==== Fact File ====
The Fact File feature appeared in select DC titles with cover dates spanning the periods notated.

1. Nov–Dec 1968 — Tarantula
2. Feb–March 1969 — The Golden Age Green Lantern
3. TK
4. Feb–Apr 1969 — Vigilante
5. Apr–May 1969 — Wildcat
6. Apr-Jun 1969 — Sargon the Sorcerer
7. May-Jun 1969 — Detective Comics no. 27
8. May–Aug 1969 — The Spectre
9. Jul-Dec 1969 — The Seven Soldiers of Victory

== See also ==
- The Amazing World of DC Comics — successor to The Wonderful World of Comics
