= The Comic Reader =

Comics news fanzine

- The cover of the final issue of The Comic Reader, featuring Evangeline.
- Editors: Jerry Bails (issues #1–25); Glen Johnson (issues #26–40); Derrill Rothermich (issues 42–48); Bob Schoenfeld (issues #49–64); Mark Hanerfeld (issues #65–77); Paul Levitz (issues #78–100); Mike Tiefenbacher (issues #101–219)
- Categories: Comics criticism and news
- Frequency: Generally monthly (Note: Issues #65–77, edited by Mark Hanerfeld, were published on an 8-times-a-year schedule, though Hanerfeld had trouble maintaining even that reduced frequency.)
- Publisher: Jerry Bails (1961–1963)
- Total circulation (c. 1972): 3,500
- First issue: Oct. 1961
- Final issue Number: Sept. 1984; 219
- Company: Academy of Comic-Book Fans and Collectors (1963–1969); TCR Publications (1971–1973); Street Enterprises (1973–1982)
- Country: United States
- Based in: Brooklyn, New York (1971–1973); Menomonee Falls, Wisconsin (1973–1984)
- Language: English

The Comic Reader (TCR) was a comics news-fanzine published from 1961 to 1984. Debuting in the pre-direct market era (before the proliferation of comics retailers), TCR was the first regularly published comics industry news fanzine, and was able to secure many contacts from within the ranks of the larger publishers. As TCR increased in popularity and influence, it was able to attract professional artist to illustrate the covers. TCR also proved to be a launching pad for aspiring comic book creators, many of whom published work in the fanzine as amateurs. Contributors from the world of fandom included founding editor Jerry Bails, key editor Paul Levitz, Paul Kupperberg, Tony Isabella, Byron Preiss, Neal Pozner, Don Rosa, Carl Gafford, and Doug Hazlewood.

The fanzine was founded in 1961 as On the Drawing Board by Jerry Bails, the "Father of Comics Fandom", changing its name to The Comic Reader in 1962 and being named the official bulletin of the Academy of Comic-Book Fans and Collectors (ACBFC). During its run, TCR won a number of industry awards, including the Alley Award and the Goethe Award/Comic Fan Art Award. In its last incarnation, published by Street Enterprises, it was more professional magazine than fanzine, and was known colloquially as "the TV Guide of the comics industry".

== Publication history ==
=== On the Drawing Board ===
Jerry Bails founded and published On the Drawing Board in October 1961, to showcase the latest comic news. Spinning-off from Bails' other zine, Alter Ego (after appearing for three issues as a column within that publication), On the Drawing Board "was devoted to blurbs and news items pertaining to upcoming events in pro comics".

Released in stand-alone form as "a single-page news-sheet", On the Drawing Board #4 (#1-3 being applied to the columns appearing in those issues of A/E) debuted on October 7, 1961. Comics fandom historian Bill Schelly described its impact:

Suddenly, fans had a way to see what was coming up on the newsstands. In some cases, they also found out the names of the writers and artists of certain features, in an era before such credits were routinely given. While there was considerable interest in developments at DC (especially the revival of Hawkman), fans also closely followed the entrance of other companies into the costumed hero sweepstakes: Archie Comics, Gold Key, Charlton, and Marvel.

=== Birth of The Comic Reader and a succession of editors ===
In March 1962, issue #8 of On the Drawing Board was retitled The Comic Reader. The "On the Drawing Board" name was retained for the periodical's news section. The (generally) monthly title became "a mainstay of fandom", winning a 1963 Alley Award.

In January 1964, Bails announced the merger of The Comic Reader with another of his fanzines, The Comicollector, under the editorship of Bill White. However, a death in White's family prevented the merger from happening, at which point Florida-based published G. B. Love merged The Comicollector into his own fanzine Rocket's Blast, as well as offering to absorb The Comic Reader. The ACBFC board, however, voted to maintain TCR as a standalone publication, and in mid-1964 New Mexico-based comics enthusiast Glen Johnson stepped forward to take over editorial duties.

Johnson was followed by a succession of editors, including Derrill Rothermich, who switched the fanzine to offset printing in late 1965. Mark Hanerfeld took over TCR in 1968 with issue #65, but by mid-1969 was having trouble maintaining a consistent publication schedule. Hanerfeld was doing double-duty as executive secretary of the ACBFC, and apparently this workload was too much for him. The ACBFC went defunct in mid-1969; and despite winning a 1969 Alley Award, by early 1970 TCR was no longer being published.

=== Levitz era ===
In early 1971, New York teenager Paul Levitz bought the property and revived The Comic Reader with issue #78, merging it with Etcetera, a zine he had previously co-published with Paul Kupperberg. From issues #78–#89, the merged zine was called Etcetera & The Comic Reader; after issue #90 the zines split up again.

Under Levitz's editorship, TCR increased circulation (going monthly after a previous schedule of eight issues per year) and changed format, usually featuring an illustrated cover and typically 16 pages in length. As the zine gained in popularity and influence, it was able to attract industry professionals, such as Jack Kirby, Rich Buckler, Walt Simonson, and Howard Chaykin, to illustrate the covers. During this period, TCR won two Best Fanzine Comic Fan Art Awards. Due to his work on the zine, Levitz became well known at the offices of DC Comics, where he eventually ended up working for the company for over 35 years in a wide variety of roles.

TCR published ballots for the 1973 Goethe Awards (for comics published in 1972); TCR staff also produced the program booklet for the 1973 Comic Art Convention.

Issue #99 (July 1973) featured TCR's first color cover.

=== Street Enterprises ===
In November 1973, with issue #101, Wisconsin-based publisher Street Enterprises took over TCR, and Mike Tiefenbacher took over as editor. Under Street Enterprises' oversight, TCR changed format to digest size, giving it even more the impression of being "the TV Guide of the comics industry". The magazine also began licensing its U.S. comics news material to the British fan press, particularly Richard Burton's Comic Media News and Martin Lock's BEM.

In early 1979, due to the cancellation of another Street Enterprises title, The Menomonee Falls Gazette, the publisher moved many of the strips featured in The Gazette over to The Comic Reader.

The emergence of Amazing Heroes in 1981, published by Fantagraphics Books, ate into TCR's readership. As long-time Fantagraphics co-publisher Kim Thompson put it: "If you want to look at it cynically, we set out to steal The Comic Reader's cheese. Which we did".

The Comic Reader published its final issue, #219, in September 1984.

== Features ==
In addition to news about creators, publishers, conventions, and the like, TCR ran recurring comic strips and features such as:

- "Bullet Crow" by Chuck Fiala (strips reprinted in 2 issues published by Eclipse Comics in 1987)
- "Captain Kentucky" by Don Rosa
- "Dateline @!!?#" by Fred Hembeck
- "Dick Duck, Duck Dick" by Jim Engel
- "Fandom Confidential" by Jim Engel and Chuck Fiala
- "Fowl of Fortune" by Chuck Fiala

== Awards ==
- 1963: Alley Award for Best Comics Fanzine
- 1969: Alley Award for Best Unlimited Reproduction Fanzine
- 1973: Goethe Award for Favorite Fan Magazine
- 1974: Comic Fan Art Award for Favorite Fanzine
- 1975: Comic Fan Art Award for Favorite Fanzine
- 1983: (nominated) Eagle Award for Favourite Specialist Comics Publication
- 1984: (nominated) Eagle Award for Favourite Specialist Comics Publication

== See also ==
- Amazing Heroes
- Marvel Age
- Wizard
