= The Dreaming (comics) =

Monthly comic series published by DC Comics

- The Dreaming #1 (June 1996). Art by Dave McKean.

Publication information
- Publisher: Vertigo
- Schedule: Monthly
- Format: Ongoing series
- Publication date: June 1996 – May 2001
- No. of issues: 60
- Main character(s): Cain and Abel; The Corinthian; Lucien; Matthew the raven Goldie

Creative team
- Created by: Neil Gaiman (writer); Sam Kieth (artist)
- Written by: Terry LaBan; Alisa Kwitney; Bryan Talbot; Caitlín R. Kiernan
- Artist: Various Artists
- Penciller: Various Artists
- Inker: Various Inkers
- Letterer: Todd Klein
- Colorist: Various Colorists

Collected editions
- Beyond the Shores of Night: ISBN 1-85286-904-6
- Through the Gates of Horn and Ivory: ISBN 1-56389-493-9

The Dreaming was a monthly comic series that ran for 60 issues (June 1996 to May 2001) and was revived in 2018. It is set in the same dimension of the DC universe as The Sandman and the stories occurred primarily within Dream's realm, The Dreaming, concentrating on characters who had played minor roles in The Sandman, including The Corinthian, Matthew the raven, Cain and Abel, Lucien the dream librarian, the faerie Nuala, Eve, and Mervyn Pumpkinhead (janitor of The Dreaming). It also introduced a number of new characters, Echo and a new (white) dream raven, Tethys. After those characters were retconned the 2018 version of The Dreaming introduced new characters such as Hyperion Keeter, WAN (An AI sent to destroy The Dreaming), and the night hag, Dora. The 2020 spin-off / continuation, The Dreaming: Waking Hours introduced other new characters such as Linsy, Ruin (a Nightmare in love with a human), and most notably, Heather After, a direct descendant of Roderick Burgess. There were brief (but often important) appearances by The Endless during the series, including cameos by Dream (both Morpheus and Daniel), Death, Destiny, and Desire.

== Publication history ==
The series was initially conceived as an anthology series edited by Vertigo editor Alisa Kwitney, and as such it was written, drawn and inked by a variety of artists. The covers were all painted by former Sandman cover-artist Dave McKean, and Sandman's writer Neil Gaiman acted as creative consultant on the series - having a notional right of refusal on scripts and plotlines (which he never exercised) and suggesting developments or characters for exploration.

However Gaiman was quick to undo events of The Dreaming comics with the publication of Endless Nights, just one year after The Dreaming ended. Endless Nights ultimately ignored events from The Dreaming, such as the death of Matthew the raven, and later the new Sandman Universe version of The Dreaming (2018) would quietly ignore all the events and new characters from the first iteration of The Dreaming.

Kwitney contacted several writers inviting them to submit stories for the new anthology, amongst them Peter Hogan on the basis of his work for British comic 2000 AD. He suggested the story that eventually became "The Lost Boy" (Issues #4-#7).

Following the completion of Al Davison's "The Dark Rose" story (issues #20 - #21), The Dreaming underwent a change of direction: it changed from an anthology series to an ongoing series concentrating on a small group of core characters. Kwitney decided that the series needed to develop its own internal continuity, with irregular The Sandman Presents mini-series being introduced to present stories told outside of that continuity. Gaiman explained the need for the change by saying:

The main thing is making it [The Dreaming] a story that is going somewhere, that feels like it's going somewhere and it will be one huge story that is going somewhere rather than these sorts of little stories that basically go 'Person A, who you've never met before nor do you care about, has a problem. They are going to go into The Dreaming and come out and their problem will be ... resolved from their experiences ...,' which was becoming the default plot. You didn't really feel that anything was necessarily going anywhere even though a lot of these stories were competently written. They also didn't display an awful lot of feeling for the characters. Many of them were very, very forgettable.

Initially, the writing duties on the revamped series were to be shared between Caitlín R. Kiernan and Peter Hogan, who had recently impressed with their stories "Souvenirs" (Issues #17 - #19) and "Ice" (Issue #16) respectively. However, Hogan's increasing commitments with other work and the perceived pre-existing fanbase that Kiernan had brought with her to the title meant that she was offered the position as sole writer from the "Many Mansions" story (issues #27-#34), despite Kiernan herself admitting that there did not seem to be much crossover between the two readerships. Peter Hogan would be made a semi-regular writer for the series The Sandman Presents by way of compensation.

The series suffered from its ties to the original Sandman series throughout its run, with Kiernan saying "from the start, The Dreaming has been saddled with living up to what Neil Gaiman did with The Sandman. It doesn't take long to get puking sick of hearing 'It's just not the same,' or 'It's not as good as The Sandman,' or 'Why is it so much darker than The Sandman,' or even 'It's almost as good as The Sandman.' I know the comparisons are inevitable, and even logical, but it's been an uphill battle trying to get readers to look at The Dreaming as a series separate from The Sandman, with its own tone and atmosphere and concerns." Kiernan received strong criticism for the direction she took the series in, with commentators placing the blame solely on her.

However, Kiernan found the experience genuinely satisfying - despite the stress and comics not being her first love - the series continued for 60 issues before being cancelled to focus on the more successful The Sandman Presents and Lucifer series. Kiernan contributed a story to this new post-Dreaming era, the three issue The Sandman Presents: Bast featuring the cat goddess introduced in the Season of Mists storyline.

The Dreaming comics have since undergone a complete reboot, written by Si Spurrier, running from November 2018 to June 2020 as part of the Sandman Universe reboot, celebrating the 30th anniversary of The Sandman. All of the events in Kiernan's The Dreaming run seem to have been either undone or retconned. Spurrier described the retcon of the original run of The Dreaming following a meeting with Neil Gaiman as "it exists as a book on the shelf in the Dreaming, where it's a different version of events." Spurrier and Bilquis Evely's run on The Dreaming revolved around using familiar characters from Gaiman's Sandman while introducing their own protagonist in the form of Dora whose mysterious background is explored throughout the series. A larger story arc took place throughout the series surrounding what would happen should the Dreaming once more find itself without its ruler.

Evely's double splash pages were particularly praised. She was named best comics artist of 2018 by Entertainment Weekly for her work on the series.

After the series ended with issue 20, DC launched a continuation in the form of The Dreaming: Waking Hours. The maxi-series is written by G. Willow Wilson with art by Nick Robles and slated to have 12 issues. G. Willow Wilson and Nick Robles likewise returned to familiar characters from Sandman while introducing their own key protagonists. In the case of The Dreaming: Waking Hours, those new characters include Lindy, a new mother and graduate student studying Shakespeare as well as Ruin, one of Dream's new nightmare creations, and Heather After, the great-granddaughter of Roderick Burgess, a powerful sorceress who happens to be a trans woman.

== Storylines ==
The following is a list of the stories published over the series' 60 issues of the retconned version of The Dreaming.[1]

- "The Goldie Factor" (Issues #1 - #3)

Goldie (Abel's pet golden gargoyle) runs away, as a result of Cain's constant abuse of his brother, and almost falls prey to Mephisto in Eden. Goldie remains in Eden and does not return to The Dreaming until issue #26. Scripted by Terry LaBan.

- The Lost Boy" (Issues #4 - #7)

Features an aged Johanna Constantine as well as Mad Hettie, working with Destiny and Cain. A story of a man losing his life and then finding a better one. Scripted by Peter Hogan.

- "His Brother's Keeper" (Issue #8)

Features the long lost brother of Cain and Abel, Seth, who wishes to uncover the truth behind the mystery of Cain's first murder of Abel. Scripted by Alisa Kwitney.

- "Weird Romance" (Issues #9 - #12)

Bridget Leary is comatose on her wedding day to a man named Chris. While comatose, she is stuck in the Dreaming, where she meets Matthew the Raven. Another man named Greenaway tries to rescue her with a stone of power called the Crackpaw.[2] Scripted by Bryan Talbot.

- "Coyote's Kiss" (Issues #13 - #14)

The trickster Coyote tries to get Eve's affection and learns his lesson.[3] Scripted by Terry LaBan.

- "Day's Work, Night's Rest" (Issue #15)

A white-collar worker gets a tour at the Dreaming from Merv Pumpkinhead and likes it a little too much. Scripted by Jeff Nicholson.

- "Ice" (Issue #16)

At the crossroads between years Nuala gets an invitation from the Deaming and Cluracan is challenged by his nemesis. Scripted by Peter Hogan.

- "Souvenirs" (Issues #17 - #19)

A Corinthian story line where he must track down a former victim who *has become a copycat killer. Along the way he meets Echo.[4] Scripted by Caitlin R. Kiernan.

- "The Dark Rose" (Issues #20 - #21)

A tale of the Corinthian set in the Victorian era. Scripted by Al Davison.

"Unkindness of One" (Issues #22 - #24)

A sequel to "Souvenirs". Scripted by Caitlin R. Kiernan.

- "My Year as a Man" (Issue #25)

The story of Aristeas of Marmora's return to life after being Dream's raven. Scripted by Peter Hogan.

- The Dreaming: Trial and Error (One-shot Special)

Focuses on Abel accusing Cain of murdering him again and again before Judge Gallows. Scripted by Len Wein.

- "Restitution" (Issue #26)

Scripted by Caitlin R. Kiernan.[5]

- "Many Mansions" (Issues #27 - #34)

The House of Mystery burns down. Scripted by Peter Hogan and Caitlin R. Kiernan.

- "Kaleidoscope" (Issue #35)[5]

A story of W. B. Yeats and Christina Weston, a woman from Lucien's past.

- The Gyres" (Issues #36 - #38)

Echo is sick and crippled in a New Orleans squat when she enters the Dreaming determined to get revenge. The Corinthian finds a way to get his own revenge against Echo.

- "The Lost Language of Flowers" (Issue #39)[5]

A teen journeys into the Dreaming to free her friend from the Three Witches. Features an introduction by Neil Gaiman.

- "Fox and Hounds" (Issue #40 - #43)

Echo is transformed into a beautiful woman who resembles the psychic Christina who Lucien once courted. Meanwhile Matthew the Raven and The Corinithian seek vengeance on her. Features an appearance by Daniel, the new Dream, who questions the dreams about their actions.

- "Trinket" (Issue #44-49)[5]

The glamour stone Nuala rejected is sought by a goblin court and a fairy living in New York City who wants to appear mortal. The Unseelie Court is also after the glamour stone and Cluracan's nemesis must come to the rescue, bringing Cluracan into the fight as well. Eventually the truth about the stone is revealed. Thessaly and Lucien join Nuala in a final confrontation with Titania.

- "Restoration" (Issue #50)

The House of Mystery is rebuilt by Merv Pumpkinhead, while Eve and Abel attempt to convince Cain to return to The Dreaming.

- "Second Sight" (Issue #51)

After the events of "Trinket" Maddy possesses a magical ability to see the ghosts, faeries and other magical forces that actually inhabit New York.

- "Exiles" (Issues #52 - #54)

Exiled from the Dreaming, The Corinthian finds himself hunted by a serial killer in Bangkok. This leads to an international and interdimensional intrigue. Echo also arrives to complicate things.

- "The Further Adventures of Danny Nod" (Issue #55)[5]

Goldie and Danny Nod are featured, interrupting historical and literary moments.

- "The First Adventure of Miss Catterina Poe" (Issue #56)

Featuring the adventures of Edgar Allan Poe's cat.

- "Rise" (Issues #57 - #60)

The Corinthian is reinstated by Dream to his role as Dark Mirror. Echo, who has been holding this position since The Corinthian's exile, is not happy with this. Echo starts to believe she is Dreams twin sister Dread and teams up with Brute and Glob to start a nightmare war. Their rampage ends at Dream's palace where Daniel must make a decision about how to stop them.

=== Collected editions ===
Two English-language trade paperbacks of the first run of The Dreaming have been published:

- The Dreaming: Beyond the Shores of Night (ISBN 1-85286-904-6). Collects The Dreaming #1-8.
- The Dreaming: Through the Gates of Horn and Ivory (ISBN 1-56389-493-9). Collects The Dreaming #15-19 and #22-25.

Three English-language trade paperbacks have been published for the Spurrier/Evely 2018-2020 series:

- The Dreaming Vol. 1: Pathways and Emanations (2019) Collects The Dreaming #1-6 and The Sandman Universe #1.
- The Dreaming Vol. 2: Empty Shells (2020) - Collects The Dreaming #7-12.
- The Dreaming Vol. 3: One Magical Movement (2020) - Collects The Dreaming #13-20.
