= Secrets of Sinister House =

Gothic anthology comic book series

- Secrets of Sinister House #5 (July 1972), cover art by Nick Cardy.

Publication information
- Publisher: DC Comics
- Schedule: Bimonthly
- Format: Ongoing series
- Genre: Horror, romance
- Publication date: July 1972 – July 1974
- No. of issues: 18
- Main characters: Eve
- Editor(s): E. Nelson Bridwell, Joe Orlando

Secrets of Sinister House was a Gothic horror-suspense anthology comic book series published by DC Comics from 1972–1974, a companion to Forbidden Tales of Dark Mansion. Both series were originally inspired by the successful ABC soap opera Dark Shadows, which ran from 1966 to 1971.

== Publication history ==
After four issues as The Sinister House of Secret Love, which featured Gothic romance/horror stories written by Michael Fleisher and others, the title changed to Secrets of Sinister House, and the original format and romance angle were abandoned the following issue.

In the same vein as House of Mystery and House of Secrets (as well as its successor, Secrets of Haunted House), Secrets of Sinister House was "hosted" by Eve (the character debuted in issue #6) and included guest appearances by Eve's cousins Cain and Abel. In issue #16, Eve was removed as host — as editor Joe Orlando departed from the title, replaced by Jack C. Harris — to focus on the concept of the "sinister houses". The following month, she began nudging Destiny out of Weird Mystery Tales.

Secrets of Sinister House was canceled after publishing fourteen issues in two years (together, Sinister House of Secret Love and Secrets of Sinister House published eighteen issues).

Edited by Joe Orlando and E. Nelson Bridwell, contributors to the title included Alfredo Alcala (issues #6, 13, 14), Robert Kanigher (#6, 9, 11), Sam Glanzman (#7), Michael William Kaluta (covers for issues #6, 7), Maxene Fabe (#8 & 11), Ruben Yandoc (#8 & 11), Jack Oleck (#9, 12, 13), Neal Adams (#10), Mike Sekowsky (#14), and Alex Niño (#8, 11-13).

== See also ==
- Haunted Love
