= Cain and Abel (comics) =

DC Comics characters

- Cain, Gregory, and Abel approach the House of Mystery in Berni Wrightson's cover artwork to Welcome Back to the House of Mystery #1.

Publication information
- Publisher: DC Comics; Vertigo Comics
- First appearance: Cain: The House of Mystery #175 (July–August 1968); Abel: DC Special #4 (July–September 1969)
- Created by: Cain: Bob Haney; Jack Sparling; Joe Orlando; Abel: Mark Hanerfeld; Bill Draut; Joe Orlando; (Based upon Cain and Abel of Christian theology)

In-story information
- Team affiliations: The Dreaming; Council of Immortals
- Notable aliases: Cain: Marcus Pierce; The Sinnerman
- Abilities: Cain: Apparently indestructible and possibly immortal; diabolical cunning; bears the "Mark of Cain" which protects him from all harm; Abel: Possibly immortal and apparently indestructible; Resurrects from any fatal wound inflicted by Cain

Cain and Abel are a pair of characters from DC Comics based on the biblical Cain and Abel. They are key figures in DC's "Mystery" line of the late 1960s and 1970s, which became the mature-readers imprint Vertigo in 1993.

Cain and Abel are based on the biblical Cain and Abel, but are altogether different characters from their Biblical counterparts. Cain and Abel are one of many key figures in DC's "Mystery" line-up referred to as horror hosts of the late 1960s and 1970s, which later became a part of the mature-readers imprint Vertigo. They were depicted as brothers and they are also sons of DC Comics' Eve (another DC horror host based on the Biblical figure Eve). In 1993, host characters like Cain, Abel, Eve and Lucien were retconned as a part of the Dreaming in the critically acclaimed Sandman comic books. The character Cain is also commonly associated with his pet gargoyle Gregory.

== Publication history ==
=== Cain ===
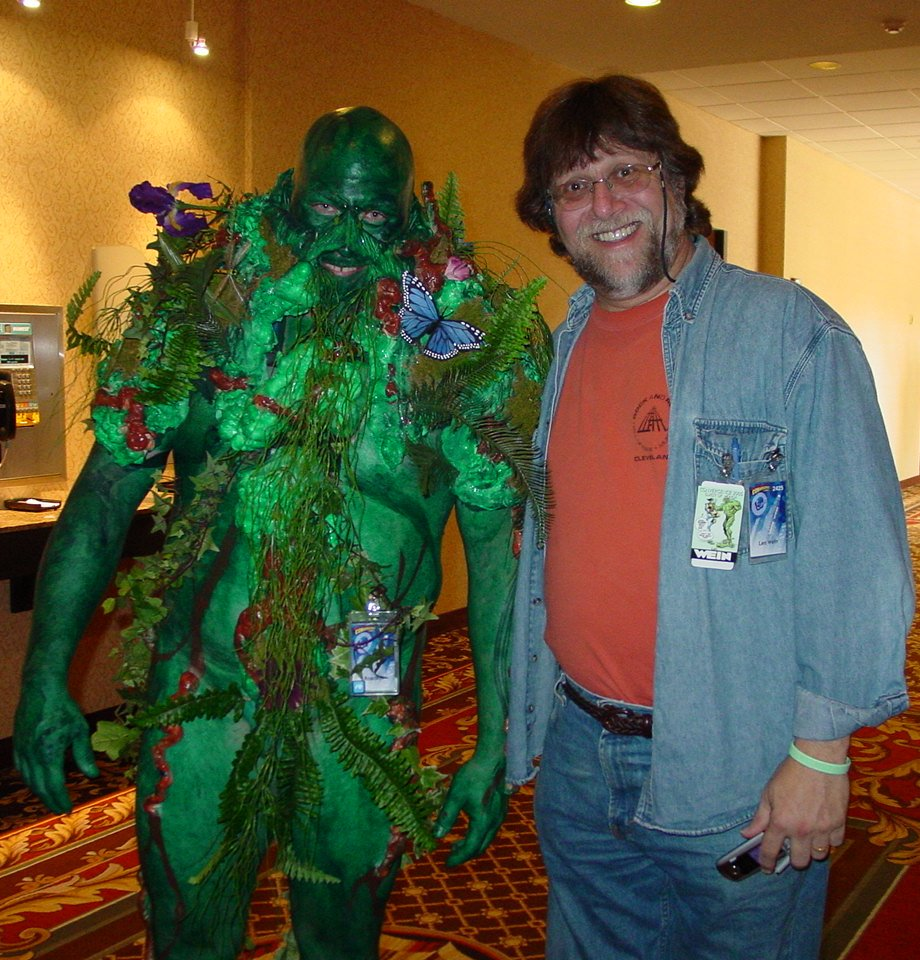
Cain's appearance was based on that of then-young comics writer Len Wein (right), shown with his creation Swamp Thing.

In 1968, Cain was created to "host" the EC-style horror comic anthologies The House of Mystery (which had begun publishing in 1950). Cain, "the Able Care-Taker", created by Bob Haney, Jack Sparling and Joe Orlando, first appeared in The House of Mystery #175 (July–August 1968), modeled on writer Len Wein, who was new to the field. (A photograph of Wein as Cain can be found in Elvira's House of Mystery #4 (June 1986).)

The House of Mystery was cancelled in 1983. The final issue showed Cain in front of the House for sale, with his bags packed, and Gregory, his pet gargoyle, behind him. In the mid-1980s, Cain became a supporting character in Blue Devil (as caretaker of the "House of Weirdness"), with Abel and Gregory making occasional appearances as well.

=== Abel ===
In 1969, Abel was created to "host" the companion EC-style horror anthology The House of Secrets (which in its Silver Age run, was published from 1956 to 1966). In 1969, DC editor Joe Orlando created the design for Abel, based on his assistant, Mark Hanerfeld:

I started out basing it on the biblical Cain and Abel but then I turned to the people that were around me. It's just a writer's trick to take people's personalities and inject them into your characters. Mark stuttered when he got nervous. He was short and heavy so Abel was short and heavy. Abel was a good counterpoint to Cain who was tall and thin.

Abel's first comics appearance was in DC Special #4 (July–September 1969), ironically written by Hanerfeld and illustrated by Bill Draut. The House of Secrets was revived with #81 (August–September 1969) and Abel began hosting immediately.

In 1978, The House of Secrets (along with another horror title, The Witching Hour) was merged into The Unexpected (which itself was canceled in 1982).

=== Together ===
During the 1970s, Cain and Abel (along with Eve) also co-hosted the horror/humor anthology Plop! Both comics had been running Dial H for Hero and Eclipso, respectively, before the introduction of the new host characters.

The cover of Vertigo's mostly-reprint Welcome Back to the House of Mystery (July 1998) showed Cain returning to the House with Abel and Gregory. Both of the anthologies that Cain and Abel debuted in are cited as one of the comic books that Neil Gaiman grew up with which helped pave the way for Cain and Abel revival within The Sandman comic books.

On the letters page of Weird Mystery Tales #3 (November 1972), Destiny stated that Cain, along with Abel and Eve, were not the same characters as their Biblical counterparts, whom Destiny said he found much more pleasant. Cain, Eve and, to a lesser extent, Abel, subsequently taunt Destiny for being dull. The Dreaming's early issues (#1–4, #8) established that Cain and Abel are their biblical counterparts. It was annotated that they did not know whether they were or if they had false memories but found evidence tying them to their biblical counterparts during the story. In the 8th issue, their wives, Jumella (Abel's twin and Cain's wife) and Aclima (Cain's twin and Abel's wife), who are also their twin sisters, and Seth were introduced to the DC Universe.

== Fictional character biography ==
=== House of Mystery/Secrets ===
Cain and Gregory move out in the final issue of The House of Mystery, issue #321 (October 1983). Art by Michael Kaluta.

Cain told tales about people who boarded the House of Mystery. Abel stammeringly took abuse from Cain and the House of Secrets, and had an "imaginary" (always in quotes) girlfriend named Goldie who berated him too. Goldie was the imaginary friend of Dick Giordano's son. Abel told the stories directly to Goldie in the early issues, although he always appeared to be alone. He said that she was a ghost.

Cain is a thin, long-limbed man with an angular, drawn face, glasses, a tufty beard, and hair drawn into two points above his ears. He is often cruel to Abel, but he is jovial and a friendly storyteller to children and does everything he can to help Superman; he has no qualms about trapping innocent people inside his television set, however, and he was employed by a vicious mink furrier. Abel is a nervous, stammering, kind-hearted man, also with a tufty beard and black hair that comes to points above his ears. He is shorter and fatter than Cain, with a more open face. The only time Abel does not stutter is when he is telling a story (The Sandman vol. 2 #40). Cain owns a large, green gargoyle named Gregory, who first appears (as a baby) in The House of Mystery #175 – apparently the offspring of enchanted sculptures who come to the house for a French sculptor who murdered the artist who designed them. Gregory grew to maturity during the series, and continued to appear in Sandman stories. He ate the Earth-1 counterparts of writer Paul Kupperberg and editor Jack C. Harris. Cain had a black cat named Oskar, who did not get along with Gregory.

Abel moves in with Cain in the House of Mystery shortly before DC Special #4. Cain calls it a temporary situation until the House of Secrets is transported, which occurred in House of Secrets #81 one month later. Their ages are vague, but Abel tells a story he claims to have heard from Cain (who frightened him with it as a child in 1957); the story originally appeared in Tales of the Unexpected #17 (September 1957).

In the final issue of The House of Mystery, Karen Berger (whom Cain met in issue #292, the first issue she edited for DC) is an unexpected guest at Cain's birthday party, takes him through a secret door that leads to the DC offices, and tells him that his series has been canceled and he is too old-fashioned. The house is torn down, and Cain metafictionally analyzes his own existence as a character in a comic book.

The characters were revived in 1985 by Alan Moore, who introduced them into his Swamp Thing series in issue #33 by retelling the Swamp Thing's origin story as depicted in a 1971 issue of House of Secrets. Cain kills Abel for revealing a secret and tells Abby Holland, "I invented murder!" In Blue Devil #20 (January 1986), Cain is the caretaker of the House of Weirdness until Blue Devil moves in and discovers that Abel is there too. He says that the California mansion is owned by "a publishing company back east".

During the Crisis (not mentioned in that series), Elvira stumbles onto the House of Mystery. The house charges her with finding Cain, who had disappeared. Metropolis is seen through a window in the garage of the House of Weirdness. Cain and Blue Devil are seen peering at Elvira in Elvira's House of Mystery. Cain and Abel reappear in Swamp Thing #49–50, where they are observers and commentators on a fierce battle in hell.

They are depicted together in Abel's first appearance and they go to their respective houses at the end of the story (the House of Secrets having been recently moved), with Cain promising that things would not go the way they did before. Although Cain abuses Abel, he does not kill him until Swamp Thing vol. 2 #33. They usually do not appear together; Cain directs more of his taunts at the reader, and Abel tries to reassure Goldie or the reader. In The House of Mystery #257 (April 1978), asylum escapee "Killer" Cowan kills six people on Christmas Eve. Cowan storms into the House of Mystery in a Santa Claus suit and orders Cain to keep him occupied with stories; Cain says that he does not want to entertain someone who ruins all that the holiday stands for. Abel is said to be a voyeur in Secrets of Sinister House #14, and shown to be one in The Sandman vol. 2 #60.

=== The Sandman and The Dreaming ===
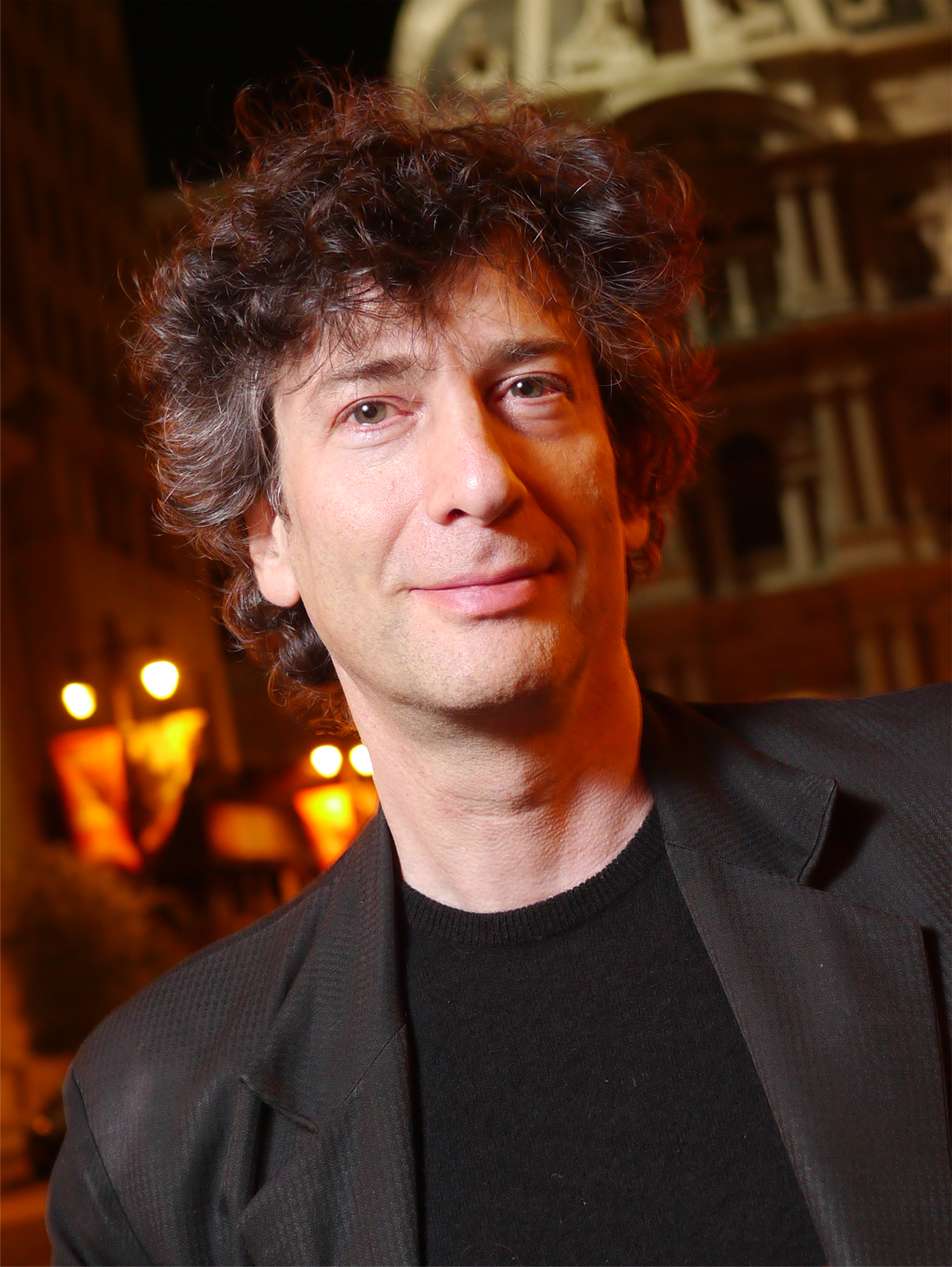
Neil Gaiman, who had read DC's mystery books as a boy, reintroduced the characters to continuity. They were later central to The Dreaming spin-off series.

The second volume of The Sandman, written by Neil Gaiman, reintroduced the characters. It is implied by the dialogue between Lucifer and Cain (who had been sent by Dream as a messenger due to his invulnerability) that the biblical Cain and Abel came to live in the Dreaming at Dream's invitation. To support this, Lucifer quotes the verse in the Bible which says that Cain was sent to live in the Land of Nod. This could be a post-Crisis retcon, however, as Destiny claimed in Weird Mystery Tales #3 that they were not the same as the Biblical Cain and Abel. The nature of reality in the Dreaming is often multiple and when Cain, Abel, and Eve are telling young Daniel Hall three stories, Cain objects to Abel's "Lil' Endless" style retelling of their origin claiming that "they [the Endless] didn't even look remotely human, none of us did!" Abel later responds to Matthew the Raven's query about whether they are their biblical namesakes or not by stating: "...oh, none of this happened on Earth..." before being interrupted by Cain. Eve also states that she is not Cain's mother, to which Cain replies, "You're everyone's mother". This sequence of events would seem to indicate that rather than being the actual literal beings Cain, Abel, and Eve the Dreaming's incarnation of them are closer to their archetypal roles of first murderer, first victim, and first mother. This is supported by several incidents when Cain or Abel have identified themselves as such and claimed that their cycle of murder and resurrection is punishment for their role in the first murder. This would also allow Joe Kubert's DC Comics adaptation of the Cain and Abel story from the Bible, in which he ignored their "Mystery" likenesses, to fit neatly into the canon.

Cain frequently kills Abel in a kind of macabre form of obsessive-compulsive disorder, re-enacting the first murder. In the Dreaming, Abel's death is impermanent, and he seems to recover after a few hours. Cain seems unable to control his frequent murders of Abel, and occasionally expresses remorse over them; there is a genuine bond between the two, beneath the surface contempt. Abel remains dedicated to Cain, and frequently dreams of a more harmonious relationship between the two.

In turn, in the graphic novel The Sandman: The Wake, Cain is so distraught when Abel is murdered permanently by the Kindly Ones, he sinks into a rambling mess when asking the new Dream to restore him. In preparation for the funeral services for the deceased Dream, Cain's anger boils over yet again when Abel reveals a secret, but he is calmed by a reprimand and restrained from murdering Abel. He displays a contract, renewed in 1989 (the year The Sandman began) that states that only he is allowed to kill Abel, because Abel can resurrect only when Cain kills him.

In the first appearance of the characters in The Sandman vol. 2 #2, Cain gives Abel an egg that soon hatches into another gargoyle, a small golden one. Abel is delighted and names the gargoyle "Irving", but Cain forcefully insists that the names of gargoyles must always begin with a "G". When Abel resists, Cain murders him, and after Abel revives he renames the gargoyle "Goldie", after a friend of his who "went away".

The main function of Cain and Abel throughout The Sandman is comic relief. However, the two play significant (though not key) roles at several points in the series; it is they who take Morpheus in until his strength is restored following his 72-year-long imprisonment. In the fourth story arc, Season of Mists, Cain is sent to Hell to give a message to Lucifer because the Mark of Cain protects him. Those who would harm Cain would have the full wrath of God visited upon them. Lucifer merely finds this funny, since he is already in Hell.

Cain and Abel also aid The Corinthian with the child Daniel during The Kindly Ones, the penultimate story arc of the series. They also appear with Morpheus in The Books of Magic #3.

=== Recent history ===
Recently, both Cain and Abel have appeared in the new House of Mystery title. Abel appeared in the missing House of Mystery with Goldie, claiming to be on a secret mission to retrieve the various nightmares that were still in the house when it vanished. Meanwhile, Cain, under the guise of a mysterious coachman, plotted with various groups to retake the House of Mystery, which he saw as his rightful property. Eventually, Cain was able to broker a deal to become the co-manager of the House of Mystery's current incarnation as a bar, and both he and Abel have become regular members of the series' cast.

== Other characters ==
=== Gregory ===
Gregory is a green gargoyle and the pet of Cain. He communicates in "grunts", which the inhabitants of the Dreaming appear to understand. He helps Goldie re-assemble Abel when Cain kills him. He first appeared as the child of two stone gargoyles in The House of Mystery #175, wherein his parents perched on the House of Mystery until they were able to kill their sculptor, a boarder in the house who had murdered their designer, and left without their egg. He later appears in Blackest Night defending Scandal Savage, the new owner of the House of Mystery, from the Suicide Squad.

=== Eve ===
Eve

Publication information
- Publisher: DC Comics; Vertigo Comics
- First appearance: Secrets of Sinister House #6 (August - September 1972)
- Created by: T. K. Sederer; Michael Kaluta

In-story information
- Team affiliations: The Dreaming; Council of Immortals
- Abilities: Sorcery

Eve, a minor fixture of the DC Comics universe, is based on the Biblical Eve, the mother of humanity and the wife of Adam within the Bible narrative in the Book of Genesis, while being an altogether new and different character. She was depicted as an original horror host for the publication company. She is depicted as the mother of both Cain and Abel (though she often denied it) and Who's Who in the DC Universe stated that they were cousins. She would be revived by Vertigo Comics with her character being retconned as part of the Dreaming. She is one of four recurring hosts of horror / suspense anthologies that were revived in The Sandman that are part of the Dreaming, with the other three being Cain, Abel and Lucien.

Eve originally appeared in Secrets of Sinister House #6 (August–September 1972); she was the series' principal host, often in stock images, usually with her raven. After issue #15, in which Eve reveals in the letter column that her raven, Edgar Allen [sic], is an enchanted deceased human, editor Joe Orlando departed from the series and so did she, the series focusing on "sinister houses". That month (December 1973), she started hosting one story per month in Weird Mystery Tales.

She became the principal host of Weird Mystery Tales with issue #15, replacing Destiny, who had moved to Secrets of Haunted House as its principal host. In Plop!, Eve, Cain, and Abel each tell one story per issue. She also made a few appearances in The House of Mystery and The House of Secrets.

In Weird Mystery Tales #3 (November – December 1972), Destiny insisted that Eve, Cain, and Abel are not their Biblical eponyms. When she is shown in The Sandman vol. 2 #2, Lucien's comment about her addresses her unfriendly nature prior to Dream's return, stating that she confines herself to nightmares.

In her early appearances, she appears only as a crone, is often identified as a witch, and has a tendency to sharp her speech. In her first appearance, she scares Cain and Abel and shouts at them, "Get out of the kitchen when it gets too hot, you cowardly mortals! Old Eve doesn't care..." Her letter column, which was answered in character, was called "Witch's Tales". She appeared as a principal character in stories in Secrets of Sinister House #9 and 11 and Weird Mystery Tales #18. In issue #9, she stays in an apartment building under an assumed name (she denies it is her in the letters column of issue #13), where the smell of her cooking causes her neighbor to report her to the superintendent, so she curses the neighbor to repeat a day – which begins wonderfully and ends in two deaths – over and over again.

Eve lives in a cave in the Dreaming and is often accompanied by Dream's raven. The first raven, Lucien, taught her how to bury Abel after Cain murdered him and she has been accompanied by a raven ever since. She is kind and has a maternal nature, though she retains her sharp language. Most of the time she appears as a black-haired woman of indeterminate age, but sometimes appears as a young, attractive maiden, a middle-aged mother, or an elderly crone. When she is first seen in The Sandman #2, she looks a little different from her original appearances. Next, in issue #24, she has put on much weight, has a friendlier face and shows her ability to de-age as she embraces Matthew. Her largest appearance is in issue #40, wherein she appears young and beautiful for the first time.

An incarnation of Eve appears as a major character in Lucifer portrayed by Inbar Lavi, depicted as an antagonist and one of the love interests of the titular character. The original release described her as "the original sinner herself" and "the first love" of Lucifer. Lavi talked about her role as the character: "I think personally the most interesting thing about Eve was the concept of sin and how she's considered to be the original sinner. But I don't really see it that way. Eve is brave enough to go after her curiosity and her passion and to me, that's very courageous. I wasn't playing her as someone who made a mistake. I was playing her as someone who is very curious and excited to learn".

== Reception and analysis ==
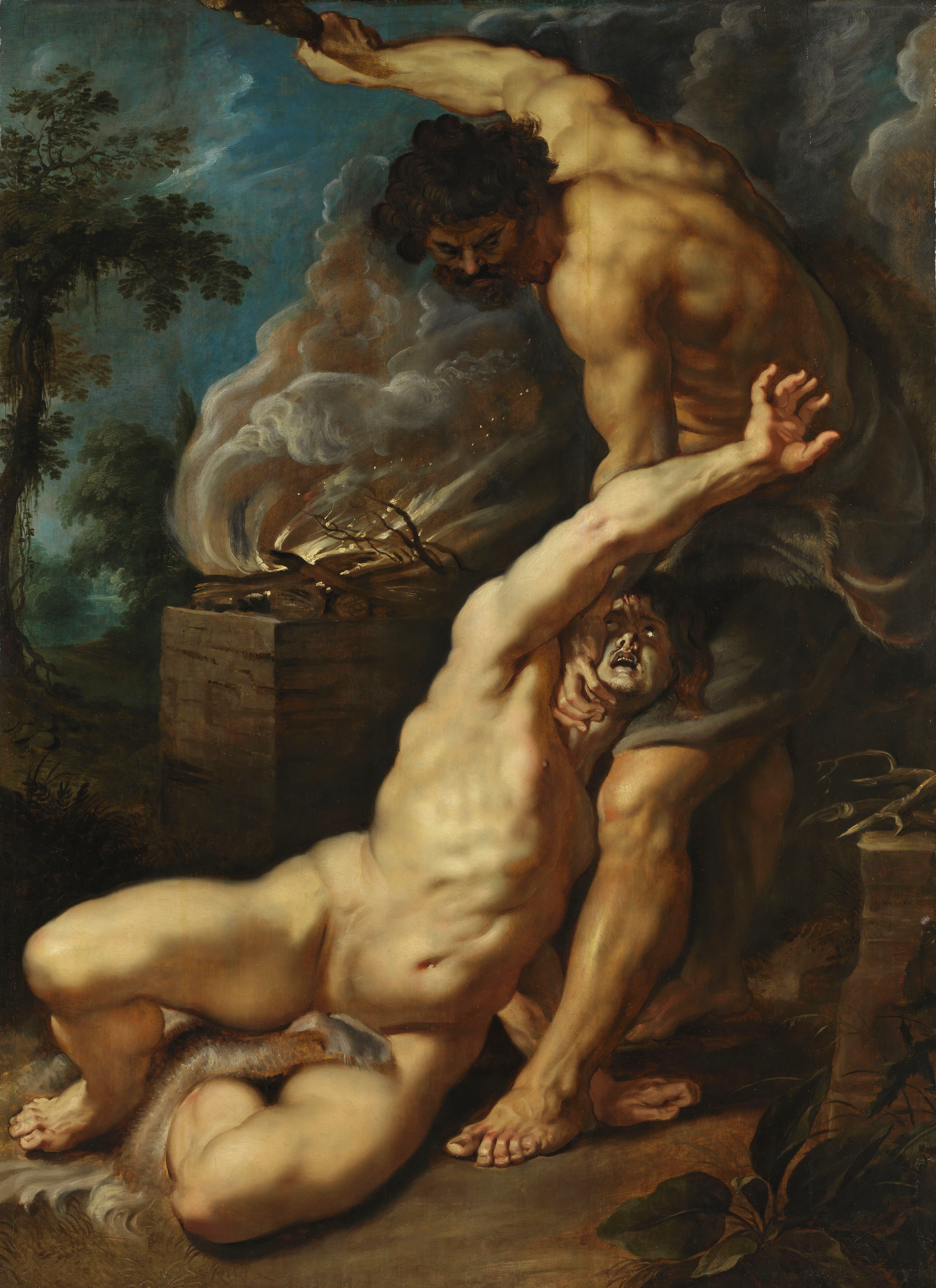
The original Biblical tale of Cain and Abel within the Book of Genesis depicts Cain slaying Abel. A recurring pattern with the DC Comics publication is the depiction of Cain repeatedly murdering Abel, similar to the old Biblical narrative as shown above. The Classic artwork is Cain Slaying Abel by Peter Paul Rubens.

Both Cain and Abel were listed by Comic Book Resources as among the top 10 characters from the Sandman comics that were hoped to be seen in Netflix's adaptation. Bibek Bhattacharya of Mint felt that the backstories of DC's major Biblically adapted characters (Cain, Abel and Eve) from The Sandman were well-told, and opined that they were even more interesting than the original Biblical tales told in the Book of Genesis itself.

Within the comics, Abel is depicted as a more meek man who is commonly a victim of Cain’s murders in various gruesome ways, much like a recurring dark comedy trope. The theme was adapted from the original tale in Genesis 4. Abel is slain by Cain within the narrative by jealousy of the Hebrew God where he accepted Abel's offering, but not Cain's. In the Biblical narrative, Cain was the first murderer and Abel was the first murder victim, so it is the same within DC Comics stories.

The relationship between Hilda Spellman and Zelda Spellman within Chilling Adventures of Sabrina has been compared to the dynamic of Gaiman's portrayal of both Cain and Abel by writers such as Christian Holub of Entertainment Weekly and David Opie of Digital Spy.

== In other media ==
=== Television ===
- Cain appears in the Justice League Action episode "Trick or Threat", voiced by Trevor Devall.
- Cain and Abel appear in Lucifer, respectively portrayed by Tom Welling and Lauren Lapkus.
- Cain and Abel appear in The Sandman, respectively portrayed by Sanjeev Bhaskar and Asim Chaudhry.

=== Miscellaneous ===
- Cain and Abel make non-speaking cameo appearances in The Batman Adventures #5 as wardens of Arkham Asylum.
- Cain and Abel appear in All-New Batman: The Brave and the Bold #12.
- Cain and Abel appear in the Audible adaptation of The Sandman, respectively voiced by Michael Roberts and Kerry Shale.
