= H. H. Hollis =

American novelist

H. H. Hollis was a pseudonym of Ben Neal Ramey (7 October 1921 - May 1977), who was an American science fiction short story writer and essayist. Ramey's main career was as a lawyer in Texas; he wrote science fiction as a hobby. Two of his stories, "The Guerrilla Trees" (1968) and "Sword Game" (1968), were each nominated for a Nebula Award.

== Bibliography ==
=== Short stories ===
- "Ouled Nail" (1966)
- "Cybernia", If (July 1966)
- "The Long, Slow Orbits" (1967)
- "Travelers Guide to Megahouston" (1967)
- "The Guerrilla Trees" (1968)
- "Sword Game" (1968)
- "Eeeetz Ch" (1968)
- "Too Many People" (1971)
- "Stoned Counsel" (1972)
- "Different Angel" (1973)
- "Every Day in Every Way" (1976)
- "The Widow Figler Versus Ceramic Gardens of Memory, Inc." (1976)
- "Arachne" (1976)
- "Dark Body" (1976)
- "Inertia" (1976)
- "Even Money" (1979)
