= Julius Schwartz =

American comic book editor (1915–2004)

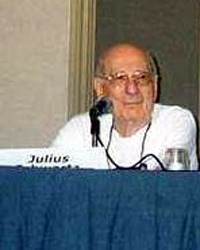
- Julius Schwartz, editor for DC Comics at San Diego Comic-Con in 2002
- Born: June 19, 1915 The Bronx, New York City, U.S.
- Died: February 8, 2004 (aged 88) New York City, U.S.
- Areas: Editor, publisher, writer, literary agent
- Pseudonym: Julie Schwartz

Julius "Julie" Schwartz (/ʃwɔːrts/ SHWORTS; June 19, 1915 – February 8, 2004) was an American comic book editor and a science fiction agent. He was born in The Bronx, New York. He is best known as a longtime editor at DC Comics, where at various times he was primary editor over the company's flagship superheroes, Superman and Batman.

He was inducted into the comics industry's Jack Kirby Hall of Fame in 1996 and the Will Eisner Comic Book Hall of Fame in 1997.

== Early life ==
Born on June 19, 1915, to Romanian-Jewish parents Joseph and Bertha who emigrated from a small town outside Bucharest, Romania. Julius and his parents resided at 817 Cauldwell Avenue in Melrose, Bronx. He graduated at age seventeen from Theodore Roosevelt High School in the Bronx.

== Career ==
In 1932, Schwartz co-published (with Mort Weisinger and Forrest J. Ackerman) Time Traveller, one of the first science fiction fanzines. Schwartz and Weisinger also founded the Solar Sales Service literary agency (1934–1944) where Schwartz represented such writers as Alfred Bester, Stanley G. Weinbaum, Robert Bloch, Ray Bradbury, and H. P. Lovecraft, including Bradbury's first published work and Lovecraft's last. Schwartz helped organize the first World Science Fiction Convention in 1939. In 1944, while looking for work, he was encouraged by his client, Alfred Bester, who was writing "Green Lantern" at the time, to apply for work as an editor at All-American Publications, a company affiliated with DC Comics; All-American's editor-in-chief Sheldon Mayer hired him to replace Dorothy Roubicek.

In 1956, after the formation of the Comics Code Authority, Schwartz worked along with writer Robert Kanigher and artists Carmine Infantino and Joe Kubert on the company's first attempt at reviving superheroes: an updated version of the Flash that would appear in Showcase #4 (October 1956). The eventual success of the new, science-fiction oriented Flash heralded the wholesale return of superheroes and the beginning of what fans and historians call the Silver Age of Comic Books. Working with writers John Broome and Gardner Fox, Schwartz revived other superheroes such as Green Lantern in Showcase #22 (October 1959); Hawkman in The Brave and the Bold #34 (February–March 1961); and the Atom in Showcase #34 (Sept-Oct. 1961). A character Schwartz primarily created himself, Adam Strange, debuted in Showcase #17 (Nov–Dec. 1958), and was unusual in that he used his wits and scientific knowledge, rather than superpowers, to solve problems.

Schwartz first thought the concept of the Justice League of America as an updating of the Justice Society and the idea was then developed by Gardner Fox and artist Mike Sekowsky. The new team debuted in The Brave and the Bold #28 (February/March 1960), and received its own title in October 1960. It became one of the most successful series of the Silver Age.

Schwartz oversaw the introduction of the Elongated Man in The Flash #112 (May 1960) by writer John Broome and artist Carmine Infantino.

In 1964, Schwartz was made responsible for reviving the faded Batman titles. Under his editorial instructions, Broome and Infantino jettisoned the sillier aspects that had crept into the series such as Ace the Bathound and Bat-Mite and gave the character a "New Look" that premiered in Detective Comics #327 (May 1964). During the rise in popularity of the Batman comics thanks to the Batman TV Series, William Dozier (producer of the show), pitched an initial concept for a female hero and Schwartz, Gardner Fox, and Carmine Infantino introduced Barbara Gordon as a new version of Batgirl in a story titled "The Million Dollar Debut of Batgirl!" in Detective Comics #359 (January 1967).

He helped writer Dennis O'Neil and artist Neal Adams come to prominence at DC Comics. The duo, under the direction of Schwartz, would revitalize the Batman with a series of stories reestablishing the character's dark, brooding nature. Schwartz edited Detective Comics until issue #481 (Dec. 1978/Jan. 1979) and Batman until issue #309 (March 1979).

From 1971 to 1986 Schwartz was the editor of the Superman titles, helping to modernize the settings of the books and move them away from "gimmick" stories to stories with more of a character-driven nature. This included an attempt to scale back Superman's powers while removing kryptonite as an overused plot device. This proved short-lived, with Schwartz bowing to pressure to restore both elements in the titles. Schwartz oversaw the launch of DC Comics Presents in 1978 and edited it throughout its 97 issue run.

As an editor, Schwartz was heavily involved in the writing of the stories published in his magazines. He worked out the plot with the writer in story conferences. The writer would then break down the plot into a panel-by-panel continuity, and write the dialogue and captions. Schwartz would in turn polish the script, sometimes rewriting extensively.

Schwartz would often add science fiction names and pseudonyms in stories he edited, such as "Paul French", a reference to Isaac Asimov.

=== Later career ===
Schwartz retired from DC in 1986 after 42 years at the company, but continued to be active in comics and science fiction fandom until shortly before his death. As a coda to his career as a comic book editor, Schwartz edited seven releases in the DC Graphic Novel line adapted from classic science fiction works by Harlan Ellison, Robert Silverberg, Bradbury, and others. In 2000 he published his autobiography, Man of Two Worlds: My Life in Science Fiction and Comics, co-authored with Brian Thomsen.

He was a popular guest at comics and science fiction conventions, often attending 10–12 conventions a year.

== Personal life ==
In 1952, Schwartz married Jean Ordwein, who had been his secretary. She died in 1986 from emphysema. Schwartz's relationship with Jean had been particularly close, and he never remarried or dated following her death. Not many years later, Schwartz's stepdaughter Jeanne (Jean's daughter from a previous marriage) died from the same illness.

Schwartz died at the age of 88, after being hospitalized for pneumonia. He was survived by his son-in-law, grandchildren and great-grandchildren. He remained a "goodwill ambassador" for DC Comics and an Editor Emeritus up until his death.

== Awards ==
In 1998, Dragon*Con chairman Ed Kramer established the Julie Award, bestowed for universal achievement spanning multiple genres and selected each year by a panel of industry professionals. The inaugural recipient was science-fiction and fantasy Grand Master Ray Bradbury. Additional awards, presented by Schwartz each year, included Forrest J. Ackerman, Yoshitaka Amano, Alice Cooper, Will Eisner, Harlan Ellison, Neil Gaiman, Carmine Infantino, Anne McCaffrey, Peter David, Jim Steranko, and Micky Dolenz.

In addition to his induction into both of the comic-book industry's halls of fame, Schwartz received a great deal of other recognition over the course of his career, including:

- 1962 Alley Award for Best Editor
- 1972 Shazam Award for Superior Achievement by an Individual in 1972, for bringing the Marvel Family back into print.
- 1981 Inkpot Award
- 1985 Named as one of the honorees by DC Comics in the company's 50th anniversary publication Fifty Who Made DC Great.
- 1997 Raymond Z. Gallun Award for "outstanding contributions in the genre of science fiction" - co-recipient with Harlan Ellison

== Accusations of sexual misconduct ==
Several women have alleged instances of sexual harassment from Schwartz and stated that his behavior was an open secret in the comics community. These include Heidi Macdonald, Jo Duffy, Jill Thompson and Colleen Doran. When Doran filed a complaint to DC Comics, the company ceased hiring her for freelance jobs. An article by Duffy, Thompson, and Doran was held back by The Comics Journal and only published after Schwartz's death.

== Appearances in comics ==
Schwartz has appeared as himself in a number of comics:

- The Flash #179 (May 1968)

In the "Flash — Fact Or Fiction" story (reprinted in The Greatest Flash Stories Ever Told), the Flash finds himself on "Earth Prime" (the real Earth that we live on). He contacts the "one man on Earth who might believe his fantastic story and give him the money he needs. The editor of that Flash comic mag!" Schwartz helps the Flash build a cosmic treadmill so that he can return home.

- Justice League of America #123 (October 1975) and #124 (November 1975)

In "Where On Earth Am I?" and "Avenging Ghosts of the Justice Society", Schwartz tasks writers Cary Bates and Elliot S. Maggin with inventing a fresh plot for the Justice League of America comic book. Using the cosmic treadmill left behind by the Flash in Flash #179, Bates and Maggin are transported to Earth-Two and Earth-One, respectively, leaving Schwartz to cover for their absence when DC Publisher Carmine Infantino walks into his office.

- Superman #411 (1985)

As a 70th birthday present, the staff at DC Comics made Superman #411 as a surprise tribute to Schwartz, who was involved in creating what he thought was #411. The cover shows Schwartz in his office being surprised by real-life co-workers just before Superman flies in the window with a birthday cake. The story features Schwartz playing himself as a down-and-out character with a modified version of his real history.

- Action Comics #583 (September 1986)

The cover of part two of the two-part alternate-universe story "Whatever Happened to the Man of Tomorrow?", written by Alan Moore and begun in the same month's Superman #423, shows Superman flying away from a number of DC Comics staff, including Schwartz.

- Superman and Batman: World's Funnest (2000)

During Mister Mxyzptlk and Bat-Mite's rampage in numerous DC Universe realities, they find the "real" Earth and Julie Schwartz working in the DC offices.

- DC Comics Presents (2004)

After Schwartz's death, DC Comics issued a series of eight standalone one-shot specials. Each issue featured two stories based on a classic DC cover from the mid-1950s and 1960s Silver Age of Comic Books, reflecting Schwartz's frequent practice of commissioning a cover concept, then telling the writers to create a story about that cover. Schwartz or a doppelganger thereof appeared in all eight issues, serving various roles.

- Schwartz appeared as a character in the Ambush Bug titles by Keith Giffen, which Schwartz edited.
- Schwartz appears as the class teacher in the humorous 2018 book "JL8", featuring the DC superheroes as kingergarteners.

== Quotes ==
Nick Cardy on the popular but apocryphal anecdote, told by Schwartz, about Carmine Infantino firing Cardy over not following a cover layout, only to rehire him moments later when Schwartz praised the errant cover art:

[A]t one of the conventions ... I said, "You know, Carmine, Julie Schwartz wrote something in [his autobiography] that I don't remember at all and it doesn't sound like you at all." And I told him the incident ... and he said, "That's crazy. You know I always loved your work. Gee, you were one of the best artists in the business. The guy's crazy." So I said, "Okay, come on." We went over to Julie Schwartz's table and we told him what our problem was. And Carmine and I said, "We don't remember the incident." So Julie said, "Well, it's a good story, anyway." [laughs] And that was it. He let it go at that. [laughs] He just made it up.

== Bibliography ==
As editor unless noted:

=== DC Comics ===
- Action Comics #419–583 (1972–1986)
- The Adventures of Rex the Wonder Dog #1–46 (1952–1959)
- Atari Force Special #1 (Plotter) (1986)
- All-American Comics #58–87, 100–102 (1944–1948)
- All-American Western #103–126 (1948–1952)
- All-Flash #15–32 (1944–1948)
- All Star Comics #21–57 (1944–1951)
- All-Star Western #58–119 (1951–1961)
- Ambush Bug #1–4 (1985)
- The Atom #1–38 (1962–1968)
- The Atom & Hawkman #39–45 (1968–1969)
- Batman #164–309 (1964–1979)
- Batman Family #1–16 (1975–1978)
- Batman: Gotham Knights #20 (Batman Black and White) (writer) (2001)
- Big All-American Comic Book #1 (writer) (1944)
- Blue Beetle #1–4 (1986)
- The Brave and the Bold #28–30, 34–36, 42–49, 61–62 (1960–1965)
- Captain Action #3–5 (1969)
- Comic Cavalcade #7–29 (1944–1948)
- The Daring New Adventures of Supergirl #1–13 (1982–1983)
- DC Comics Presents #1–97, Annual #1–4 (1978–1986)
- DC Science Fiction Graphic Novel #1–7 (1985–1987)
- DC Special Series #5 (Superman), #15 (Batman) (1977, 1978)
- Detective Comics #327–436, 444–482 (1964–1973, 1974–1979)
- The Flash #105–269 (1959–1979)
- Flash Comics #54–104 (1944–1949)
- From Beyond the Unknown #1–25 (1969–1973)
- Green Lantern #12–14, 16–20, 22, 24–38 (1944–1949)
- Green Lantern (vol. 2) #1–89, 93–103 (1960–1972, 1977–1978)
- Hawkman #1–21 (1964–1967)
- Hopalong Cassidy #86–135 (1954–1959)
- The Joker #1–9 (1975–1976)
- Justice League of America #1–165 (1960–1979)
- Krypton Chronicles #1–3 (1981)
- Mystery in Space #1–91 (1951–1964)
- The New Adventures of Superboy #1–54 (1980–1984)
- Sensation Comics #30–48, 81, 101–102, 104, 106–116 (1944–1953)
- Shazam! #1–26 (1973–1976)
- Showcase #4, 8, 13–14, 17–19, 22–24, 34–36, 55–56, 60–61, 64 (1956–1966)
- Son of Ambush Bug #1–6 (1986)
- Spectre #1–8 (1967–1969)
- Strange Adventures #1–163, 217–244 (1950–1964, 1969–1973)
- Strange Sports Stories #1–6 (1973–1974)
- Super Friends #17–47 (1979–1981)
- Supergirl (vol. 2) #14–23 (1983–1984)
- Superman #233–423, Annual #9–12, Special #1–3 (1971–1986)
- The Superman Family #164–180, 195–222 (1974–1976, 1979–1982)
- Superman: The Secret Years #1–4 (1985)
- Teen Titans #45–50 (1976–1977)
- Weird War Tales #109–124 (1982–1983)
- Western Comics #43–85 (1954–1961)
- Wonder Woman #9, 12–16, 33–41, 43–50, 212–227; #33–35, 37–41, 43–53, 55–57, 65–66 (Writer for Wonder Women of History back–ups) (1944–1951, 1974–1977)
- World's Finest Comics #198–205, 207–214, 256, 259–261 (1970–1972, 1979–1980)

=== DC Comics and Marvel Comics ===
- Superman vs. The Amazing Spider-Man (1976) (as consulting editor)

=== Autobiography ===
- Schwartz, Julius: Man of Two Worlds: My Life In Science Fiction and Comics, Harper Paperbacks, 2000, ISBN 978-0380810512.

Preceded by Sheldon Mayer	All-American Comics editor 1944–1947	Succeeded by Sheldon Mayer
Preceded by Sheldon Mayer	Flash Comics editor 1944–1949	Succeeded by n/a
Preceded by Sheldon Mayer	Comic Cavalcade editor 1944–1948	Succeeded by Larry Nadle
Preceded by Sheldon Mayer	Green Lantern editor 1944–1949	Succeeded by n/a
Preceded by n/a	The Flash editor 1959–1979	Succeeded by Ross Andru
Preceded by n/a	Green Lantern (vol. 2) editor 1960–1972	Succeeded by Dennis O'Neil (in 1976)
Preceded by n/a	Justice League of America editor 1960–1979	Succeeded by Ross Andru
Preceded by Jack Schiff	Detective Comics editor 1964–1973	Succeeded by Archie Goodwin
Preceded by Jack Schiff	Batman editor 1964–1979	Succeeded by Paul Levitz
Preceded by Mort Weisinger	World's Finest Comics editor 1970–1972	Succeeded by Murray Boltinoff
Preceded by Mort Weisinger	Superman editor 1971–1986	Succeeded by Andrew Helfer
Preceded by Murray Boltinoff	Action Comics editor 1972–1986	Succeeded by Andrew Helfer
Preceded by Robert Kanigher	Wonder Woman editor 1974–1977	Succeeded by Dennis O'Neil
Preceded by Archie Goodwin	Detective Comics editor 1974–1979	Succeeded by Paul Levitz
Preceded by Dennis O'Neil	Green Lantern (vol. 2) editor 1977–1978	Succeeded by Jack C. Harris
