= The Menomonee Falls Guardian =

- Type: weekly (June 1973– February 1976), monthly (March 1976–August 1976)
- Format: tabloid newspaper
- Founder(s): Jerry Sinkovec and Mike Tiefenbacher
- Publisher: Street Enterprises
- Editor: Mike Tiefenbacher
- Founded: June 28, 1973
- Ceased publication: August 1976
- City: Menomonee Falls, Wisconsin
- Country: U.S.
- Circulation: 1,300
- Sister newspapers: The Menomonee Falls Gazette

The Menomonee Falls Guardian was a tabloid published in the mid-1970s by Street Enterprises (based in Menomonee Falls, Wisconsin) that reprinted humor comic strips from the United States and the UK. (The Guardian's sister publication, The Menomonee Falls Gazette, focused on reprints of adventure strips.) The Guardian was edited by Mike Tiefenbacher.

The Menomonee Falls Guardian is popular among comic-strip collectors. Back issues are frequently put up for sale on eBay.

== Publication history ==
The first issue appeared June 28, 1973, with new issues published weekly until February 23, 1976, when it became a monthly publication, running until August 1976.

Four issues of The Menomonee Falls Guardian Special, featuring Alley Oop, were published from 1973–1975.

The Menomonee Falls Guardian published 146 issues in total.

== List of comic strips ==
The following is a complete list of comic strips that were reprinted in The Menomonee Falls Guardian, along with the issues in which they appeared:

- Alley Oop (2-146)
- Barney Google and Snuffy Smith (2)
- B.C. (1-144)
- Beetle Bailey (1-146)
- Benjy (23)
- Bill (4)
- Boob McNutt (4)
- Boon Dock (27, 29, 30, 33-59 odd, 61-146)
- The Born Loser (16-146)
- Broom Hilda (1-146)
- Bugs Bunny (18, 19, 21, 22)
- Bunky (2)
- Captain Easy (6-72; also reprinted in The Menomonee Falls Gazette)
- Conchy (1-146)
- Cogg the Robot (132)
- Doc Chant (70)
- Eek & Meek (17-146)
- Feiffer (8-62 even, 64-77)
- Fiddlefoot (81-92)
- Frank and Ernest (19, 61-146)
- Funny Business (16-146)
- Gahan Wilson's Sunday Comics (112-129)
- Gasoline Alley (37-146)
- Gordo (39-144)
- Hägar the Horrible (5)
- The Heroes' League (72-78 even)
- Igloo Pete (11, 13)
- Joe Crow (6)
- Joe Palooka (1-112)
- Jornie Bignose (1-5, 7, 9, 15, 17, 21, 25)
- Krazy Kat (1-60, 116-146)
- Mickey Finn (1-129)
- Mickey Mouse (117-146)
- Mirk and Monty (119, 121, 125, 127, 129)
- Momma (2)
- Neil the Horse (118-140 even, 142-146)
- Out Our Way (113-115, 123, 126)
- Our Boarding House (113-115, 126)
- Pogo (1-111)
- Popeye (1-146)
- Rick O'Shay (116-129)
- Road-Runners (65-67, 69-79 odd, 80, 100, 106, 127, 133)
- Romeo Brown (1-38)
- Sally Bananas (1-36)
- Sam's Strip (134-146)
- Sappo (3)
- Sidney (13)
- The Squirrel Cage (1, 5)
- Trim's Arena (41)
- Tumbleweeds (1-144)
- Winthrop (16-146)

== See also ==
- Graphic Story Magazine
- Hogan's Alley
- Nemo, the Classic Comics Library
