= Hogan's Alley (magazine) =

Magazine devoted to comic art

- The cover of Hogan's Alley #16
- Editor: Tom Heintjes
- Categories: Comic art
- Frequency: irregularly
- Publisher: Bull Moose Publishing
- Founder: Tom Heintjes and Rick Marschall
- First issue: 1994; 31 years ago
- Country: United States
- Based in: Atlanta, Georgia
- Language: English
- Website: www.hoganmag.com

Hogan's Alley is a magazine devoted to comic art, published on an irregular schedule since 1994 by Bull Moose Publishing in Atlanta, Georgia, United States. Subtitled "the magazine of the cartoon arts", it covers comic strips, comic books, cartoons, and animation. Originally planned as a quarterly, the frequency is closer to that of an annual, with 20 issues published in 22 years.

The editor is Tom Heintjes, who also edits three magazines for the Federal Reserve Bank. The magazine was co-founded by Heintjes and Rick Marschall, former editor of Nemo, the Classic Comics Library. The magazine's art director is David Folkman.

== Publication history ==
Interviewed in 2004, Heintjes gave some background on the magazine's origins:

Rick Marschall and I ... often talked about the type of coverage we wanted cartooning to have, and we would blue-sky about our ideal comics magazine. It sounded so good that – like a couple of idiots – we decided to put it out ourselves.... To fund the issue – the printing and postage and advertising – we emptied our piggy banks, sold some of our comics stuff, and sought investments from friends who thought our idea had merit. The earliest issues all lost money, but it's become largely a break-even endeavor by now. We pay our writers, although David and I have never made a penny from the magazine.

== The title ==
In the 2004 interview, Heintjes discussed the magazine's title — and various sources of confusion about it:

One thing we felt was important was to connect cartooning's present to its earliest days, so we came up with the title Hogan's Alley. In hindsight, from a marketing point of view, it probably isn't a good title. Most comics fans have no idea what the title represents – the Yellow Kid's neighborhood – so they don't know that they might be interested in the magazine. Also – we found this out later – a Hogan's Alley is a firearms training exercise, so I occasionally get letters from gun owners who felt tricked into picking up the magazine. I am not crazy about the idea of misleading a bunch of gun owners, but we're stuck with the title now.

== Writers ==
The scope of the magazine ranges from historical articles to coverage of current comic strips. Contributing writers have included Ron Goulart, R. C. Harvey and Allan Holtz. In issue #12, Holtz examined the early evolution of Sunday comics supplements to the daily comic strip, notably The Importance of Mister Peewee, which ran in Joseph Pulitzer's New York World in 1903-04. In that same issue, R. C. Harvey offered an in-depth profile of cartoonist Dave Breger.

Interview subjects have included Gus Arriola, C. C. Beck and Will Eisner.

== See also ==
- Billy Ireland Cartoon Library & Museum
- Comic Art
- The Comics Journal
- The Menomonee Falls Gazette
- The Menomonee Falls Guardian
