= Star Hawks =

American comic strip (1977–1981)

- Author: Ron Goulart (1977–April 1979); Archie Goodwin (1979-1980); Roger Stern (1979); Roger McKenzie (1980-1981)
- Illustrator(s): Gil Kane (uncredited): Ernie Colón, Howard Chaykin
- Current status/schedule: Daily and Sunday; concluded
- Launch date: October 3, 1977
- End date: May 2, 1981
- Syndicate(s): Newspaper Enterprise Association (1977–c. 1979); United Feature Syndicate (c. 1979–1981)
- Publisher(s): The Menomonee Falls Gazette; Ace/Tempo; Blackthorne Publishing; Amazing Heroes; Hermes Press; IDW Publishing
- Genre(s): adventure, adults

Star Hawks was a comic strip created by Ron Goulart and Gil Kane, first published on October 3, 1977, that ran through May 2, 1981. It was written through April 1979 by Goulart, followed by Archie Goodwin (1979-1980), Roger McKenzie (1980-1981) and Roger Stern (writing assist, 1979). Comics veteran Gil Kane provided the artwork, with uncredited help (during a period of illness on Kane's part) from Ernie Colón and Howard Chaykin.

Kane received the National Cartoonist Society Story Comic Strip Award for 1977 for his work on the strip.

Goulart also wrote two Star Hawks prose novels: Empire 99 and The Cyborg King.

== Publication history ==
In 1978, shortly after the launch of the strip, Kane recalled its genesis:

I got a call from Ron Goulart, who told me he'd been having some talks with Flash Fairfield, who is the art editor of the comics at [the newspaper syndicate] NEA, and they wanted to see me about going to work on that strip. I met with them at that time. Ron had done about two weeks of material, but it was very far from where we went with it. So we reworked the material, and I'm very strong ... on romance and lyricism, and I started to advance the cause of that kind of material and make it less satirical and more of a classic adventure strip. [For the hero,] originally I had James Coburn in mind. ... The hero's friend, Chavez, was modeled after a bald-headed Victor McLaglen.

== Format ==
The daily strip was unique in that initially it was two-tier: each daily was twice as large as the normal daily strip. This format allowed artist Kane great flexibility in layout. Many papers were reluctant to devote so much space to a single strip. It changed to a single tier as of July 30, 1979.

The strip ran daily and Sunday for three and a half years, for a total of 1,252 strips.

== Reprints ==
The strip from the start was run in The Menomonee Falls Gazette. Ace/Tempo published two paperback black and white reprint volumes. Blackthorne Publishing produced four issues in comic book format of black and white reprints. Early issues of Amazing Heroes carried reprints of the strip. All of these reprint series omitted occasional bridging strips (the first two strips, which set the tone for the series, were most often not reprinted). In 2004 Hermes Press released the entire run of the strip in a single volume. IDW Publishing reprinted the complete series—dailies and Sundays—in 2017–2018, in three volumes.
