= Nemo (magazine) =

Magazine focusing on the history and creators of vintage comic strips

- Issue 24 cover
- Publisher: Fantagraphics
- Founder: Rick Marschall
- First issue: 1983
- Final issue Number: 1990; 31
- Country: United States
- Based in: Stamford, Connecticut
- Language: English
- ISSN: 0746-9438
- OCLC: 1140553753

Nemo, the Classic Comics Library was a magazine devoted to the history and creators of vintage comic strips. Created by comics historian Rick Marschall, it was published between 1983 and 1990 by Fantagraphics.

Nemo ran for 31 issues (the last being a double issue) plus one annual. Most issues were edited by Marschall. The title was taken from the classic comic strip Little Nemo. While some issues were thematic, most were a mix of articles, interviews, comic strip reprints and more.

Marschall later co-founded another magazine about comics, Hogan's Alley.

== Nemo Bookshelf ==
During that same period in the 1980s, Fantagraphics launched an imprint, Nemo Bookshelf, the Classic Comics Library. This was a line of classic comic strip reprint books, including Little Orphan Annie, Pogo, Red Barry, Dickie Dare, The Complete E. C. Segar Popeye and Prince Valiant.

== Issues ==
1. Terry and the Pirates
2. Superman
3. Popeye
4. Flash Gordon
5. Fantasy in Comics
6. Alley Oop
7. Disney legends
8. Little Orphan Annie
9. Hal Foster Interview
10. Cartoon Christmas Cards
11. Art of Charles Dana Gibson, Sam's Strip by Mort Walker and Jerry Dumas, Clare Victor Dwiggins, Nervy Nat by James Montgomery Flagg, Slim Jim
12. Cartoonists and World War II
13. Red Barry
14. George McManus
15. Milton Caniff's first art script
16. Huck Finn
17. Dick Tracy
18. Al Capp
19. Kerry Drake
20. Golden Age of Comics Promotion
21. King Aroo
22. John Held Jr., Jimmy Swinnerton, 100 years ago, Joe Palooka
23. Little Orphan Annie, Hi and Lois
24. Rube Goldberg
25. Edwina Dumm's Cap Stubbs and Tippie, Milton Caniff's advertising work, reminiscences by John Neville Wheeler, early work of Gene Ahern
26. T. S. Sullivant's Unforgettable Comic Zoo
27. Cartoon Art of Norman Rockwell, "Lovely Lilly" by Carolyn Wells, chalk-plate cartoon production, William Faulkner and The Comics, "White Boy" by Garrett Price
28. Ethnic Images
29. Gasoline Alley Sunday Pages, interview with Ferd Johnson and Texas Slim strips, Ming Foo by Nicholas Afonsky and Brandon Walsh
30. Little Nemo, Joseph Keppler, Ernie Bushmiller
31. Double Issue - Charles Schulz Interview, Milton Caniff, Krazy Kat, Cliff Sterrett
- Annual 1 — Screwball Comics Special Milt Gross, Dr. Seuss, Smokey Stover, Rube Goldberg

== See also ==
- The Menomonee Falls Gazette
- The Menomonee Falls Guardian
