= Street Enterprises =

American publishing company

- Status: defunct (1984)
- Founded: 1971
- Founder: Jerry Sinkovec and Mike Tiefenbacher
- Country of origin: U.S.
- Headquarters location: Menomonee Falls, Wisconsin
- Distribution: Newsstands, Direct market
- Key people: Sinkovec and Tiefenbacher
- Publication types: Newspapers, Magazines, Comic books
- No. of employees: 2

Street Enterprises was a publishing company that focused on reprints of newspaper comic strips from the United States and the United Kingdom. Operating from 1971–1984, Street Enterprises is most known for the sister publications The Menomonee Falls Gazette and The Menomonee Falls Guardian, as well as for taking over publication of the comics news-zine The Comic Reader.

The company was based in Menomonee Falls, Wisconsin, and was the partnership of publisher Jerry Sinkovec (b. 1948) and editor Mike Tiefenbacher (b. 1952), who ran the operation out of a storage trailer. The S and T in "STreet" came from the first letters of the founders' last names.

== History ==
Milwaukee-area comics enthusiasts Sinkovec and Tiefenbacher (a University of Wisconsin–Milwaukee art school graduate) met through letters printed in comics fanzines; Sinkovec himself had previously published six issues of the fanzine Comic Commentary (1970–71). Fans of adventure comic strips, which by the early 1970s had mostly disappeared from American newspapers, they banded together to publish The Menomonee Falls Gazette to keep the genre alive. In the company's early years, they published a selection of 32-page comic one-shots featuring a single character, such as The Cisco Kid, Jungle Jim, Krazy Kat, Prince Valiant, Rip Kirby, and Flash Gordon.

The dedicated partners struggled financially from the start, but nonetheless in 1973 took on two more ongoing publications. They began publishing The Menomonee Falls Guardian, which reprinted humor strips, and took over (from Paul Levitz) the comics news fanzine The Comic Reader, which had been founded in 1961.

To raise money, Street Enterprises produced artists' portfolios in 1975 and 1976, but by 1976, the duo were living in their parents' basements.

Despite canceling The Guardian in 1976 and The Gazette in 1978, they were able to keep publishing The Comic Reader until 1984, when the company finally went defunct.

== Titles published ==
- The Cisco Kid (1 issue, 1973)
- The Comic Reader (issue #s 101-219, 1973–1984)
- Jungle Jim (1 issue, 1972)
- Krazy Kat (1 issue, 1973) — 60 daily strips from July 3–Oct. 28, 1933
- The Menomonee Falls Gazette (232 issues, 1971–1978)
- The Menomonee Falls Guardian (146 issues, 1973–1976)
- The Menomonee Falls Guardian Special: Presents Alley Oop (4 issues, 1973–1975)
- The Gazette-Advertiser (2 issues, 1973)
- Prince Valiant (1972-1973)
- Street Comix (2 issues, 1972) — Rip Kirby and Flash Gordon

== Tiefenbacher's later career ==
During the 1980s, Tiefenbacher freelanced as a writer (and occasional artist) for a number of comics publishers, including DC Comics, Spotlight Comics, and Fantagraphics. His most notable contributions were the scripts for a number of "Whatever Happened to...?" backup stories in DC Comics Presents in 1980–1981. He also compiled indexes for the Justice League of America and Hawkman for Eclipse Comics.
