= Rick Marschall =

American historian (born 1949)

Richard "Rick" Marschall (born February 3, 1949) is an American writer, editor, and comic strip historian, described by Bostonia magazine as "America's foremost authority on pop culture." Marschall has served as an editor for both Marvel and Disney comics, plus several syndicates.

== Work ==
Marschall has written and edited more than 62 books on cultural topics, including the history of comics, television and country music. He has documented the history of comic strips in two magazines he edited: Nemo, the Classic Comics Library and Hogan's Alley. For Marvel, he founded the slick graphic story magazine Epic Illustrated. He edited comic strips (Peanuts, BC, Dick Tracy), scripted for graphic novels and animated cartoons (ThunderCats) and edited a book with Dr. Seuss.

Marschall has taught creative writing at the Summer Institute for the Gifted at Bryn Mawr College and techniques of fiction at Rutgers University and the School of Visual Arts.

In 2009, he teamed with Jonathan Barli to launch Rosebud Archives, dedicated to the preservation and publication of comic art in prints, portfolios and books. That same year, he looked back on his career:

I drew political cartoons for years. I have been a comic-strip editor of three newspaper syndicates, an editor at Marvel, a writer of Disney comics. I have taught about comics on the teaching staffs of four colleges. I consulted with the US Postal Service when they issued 20 stamps to celebrate the comics’ centennial; and the State Department has sent me overseas (I keep coming back) to mount exhibitions and talk about comics. I’ve written 62 books; edited several magazines and founded a few... I have written four books on country music, two on television history, and am today finishing a biography of Johann Sebastian Bach.

In 2024, Marschall would be a recipient of the Inkpot Award at the annual San Diego Comic Con.

== Selected bibliography ==
- American Comic Classics: A Collection of U.S. Postage Stamps
- America's Great Comic Strip Artists: From the Yellow Kid to Peanuts (Abbeville Press, 1989)
- Blondie & Dagwood's America
- Encyclopedia of Country and Western Music
- The Encyclopedia of Country Music
- The First Nemo Annual Screw Ball Comics
- The Golden Age of Television
- History of Television
- Milton Caniff, Rembrandt of the Comic Strip
- Screw Ball Comics
