= Tug Transom =

Tug Transom is a British daily comic strip written by Peter O'Donnell and drawn by Alfred Sindall. It ran in the Daily Sketch from 1954 to 1968.

The strip relates the adventures of the captain of a merchant ship in ports all over the world. The strips are identified by a letter followed by a number, each series running for approximately one year. The final strip is Q52. The only reprint of the strip in English was in The Menomonee Falls Gazette and in the now defunct Evening Star, Dunedin, New Zealand.

The series were also translated in Dutch as Kapitein Rijkers and published in Nieuwsblad van het Noorden from September 24, 1959, until 1970.
