= The Menomonee Falls Gazette =

US newspaper

- Type: weekly
- Format: tabloid newspaper
- Founder(s): Jerry Sinkovec and Mike Tiefenbacher
- Publisher: Street Enterprises
- Editor-in-chief: Mike Tiefenbacher (1971–1976)
- Founded: December 13, 1971
- Ceased publication: March 3, 1978
- Language: English
- City: Menomonee Falls, Wisconsin
- Country: U.S.
- Circulation: 1,300 (August 1976)
- Sister newspapers: The Menomonee Falls Guardian

This ad for The Menomonee Falls Gazette ran in DC Comics in 1974.

The Menomonee Falls Gazette (subtitled "The international newspaper for comic art fans") was a weekly tabloid published in the 1970s by Street Enterprises that reprinted newspaper comic strips from the United States and the UK. Strips reprinted in this publication normally fell into the adventure and soap opera categories. (Humor strips were collected in a sister publication, The Menomonee Falls Guardian.) Typically, a full week's worth of a particular strip was collected on a single page of The Gazette. Although The Gazette was available via newsstand distribution, the bulk of its sales came from subscriptions.

Street Enterprises was the partnership of publisher Jerry Sinkovec and editor Mike Tiefenbacher, who ran the operation out of a storage trailer in Menomonee Falls, Wisconsin. Fans of adventure comic strips, which by the early 1970s had mostly disappeared from American newspapers, they started The Menomonee Falls Gazette to keep the genre alive.

Contributing writers to The Menomonee Falls Gazette included R. C. Harvey. The publication is popular among comic-strip collectors. Back issues are frequently put up for sale on eBay.

== Publication history ==
A precursor to The Menomonee Falls Gazette was Edwin Aprill's Cartoonist Showcase (1968–1971), which published reprints of Tarzan, Secret Agent Corrigan, Modesty Blaise, and James Bond.

The first issue of The Menomonee Falls Gazette was published December 13, 1971.

In the fall of 1972, The Gazette had 780 subscribers in 47 U.S. states, 10 countries, Midway Island, and Puerto Rico. (By August 1976 the circulation of The Gazette was up to 1,600.)

The Gazette published ballots for the 1973 Goethe Awards (for comics published in 1972).

The Gazette published two issues of a free supplement called The Gazette-Advertiser (one in 1973, and one in 1975) to attract more subscribers.

The June 2, 1975, issue featured a Jack Kirby interview.

The final issue was published on March 3, 1978. (In total, 232 issues were published, but the final issue was mislabeled on the outside cover as #234.)

In November 1973, Street Enterprises took over publishing the long-running comics fanzine The Comic Reader (originally started in 1961 under the title On the Drawing Board by the "Father of Comics Fandom" Jerry Bails). With the cancellation of The Menomonee Falls Gazette, Street Enterprises moved many of the strips featured in The Gazette to The Comic Reader.

== List of comic strips ==
Comic strips reprinted in The Menomonee Falls Gazette include:

- Air Hawk and the Flying Doctors
- Ambler
- Apartment 3-G
- Batman
- Ben Casey
- Brick Bradford
- Buck Rogers
- Buz Sawyer
- Captain Easy (also reprinted in The Menomonee Falls Guardian)
- Dateline: Danger!
- Dick Tracy
- Dr. Kildare
- Drift Marlo
- Flash Gordon
- Friday Foster
- The Flying Doctors
- Garth
- The Heart of Juliet Jones
- James Bond
- Jeff Cobb
- Jeff Hawke
- Johnny Hazard
- Kerry Drake
- Kevin the Bold
- Little Orphan Annie
- Mandrake the Magician
- Mary Perkins, On Stage
- Modesty Blaise
- Paul Temple
- The Phantom
- Prince Valiant
- Red Ryder
- Rick O'Shay
- Rip Kirby
- Scarth A.D. 2195
- Secret Agent Corrigan
- The Seekers
- The Spirit
- Star Hawks
- Steve Canyon
- Steve Roper and Mike Nomad
- Superman
- Tarzan
- Terry and the Pirates
- Tug Transom

In addition to the reprinted strips, the Gazette also featured Fawn, an original full-page comic by Joe Wehrle, which ran from #142 to #188 with intermittent gaps. This was a revival of his earlier story published elsewhere, Fawn the Dark-Eyed.

== See also ==
- Hogan's Alley
- Nemo, the Classic Comics Library
