= Mike and Ike (They Look Alike) =

American comic strip by Rube Goldberg

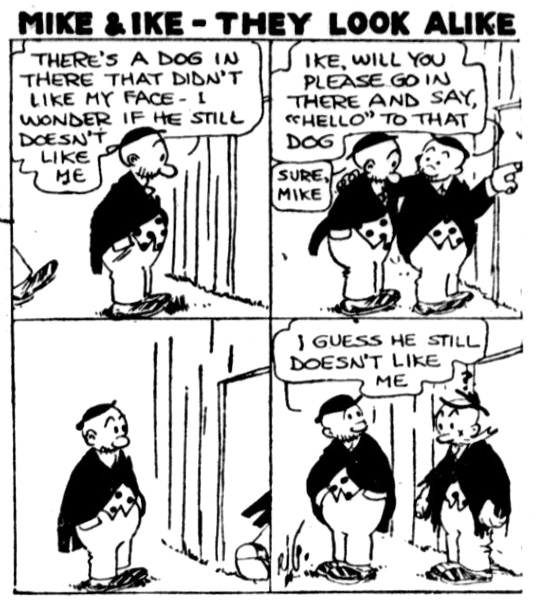
1922 comic strip

Mike and Ike (They Look Alike) was a comic strip by Rube Goldberg, who introduced the identical twin characters in the San Francisco Bulletin on September 29, 1907. The strip was syndicated by the McClure Syndicate from March 9, 1913, to February 1, 1914.

Comics historian Don Markstein traced the history of the characters in his Toonopedia:

Mike & Ike started while Goldberg was in San Francisco, working as sports cartoonist for that city's Bulletin (where he'd replaced another great, Thomas A. "Tad" Dorgan, creator of Judge Rummy and his pals). The identical twin morons were originally done as a half-page Sunday series for World Color Printing Co., which later printed most of America's comic books. At the time, it was functioning as both a printer and a syndicate for Sunday comics, distributing Slim Jim, Major Ozone and several others. They didn't have much impact there, but the concept hung around. For years afterward, Goldberg often slipped Mike & Ike panels, in which they played straight man and gag man, onto the ends of his daily comics, keeping them in the public eye. They were well enough known to have starred in the second issue of Comic Monthly (February, 1922) a short-lived magazine that reprinted various King Features offerings, such as Polly and Her Pals in #1 and S'matter, Pop? in #3. Though it didn't use what later became the standard format for comic books, Comic Monthly, which flitted across the publishing scene in a single year, long predated Famous Funnies as America's first periodic comic book. In the late 1920s, Goldberg asserted they were uncles of Boob McNutt, and they became supporting characters in Boob's Sunday page.

== Films ==
Goldberg's characters were adapted to film with Dancing Fools, released by Universal Pictures on September 21, 1927. Charles King (as Mike) and Charles Dorety (as Ike) portrayed the duo in eight of the 24 "Mike & Ike" comedy shorts. The others starred Joe Young and Ned La Salle. The series ended August 28, 1929 with the release of Good Skates.
