= Boob McNutt =

American comic strip by Rube Goldberg

- On the cover of Nemo #24, Boob McNutt says, "I'll wait for my streetcar in here where it's safe."
- Author: Rube Goldberg
- Current status/schedule: Concluded Sunday strip
- Launch date: June 9, 1918
- End date: September 23, 1934
- Syndicate(s): King Features Syndicate (1918–1922); McNaught Syndicate (1922–1934)
- Genre: Humor

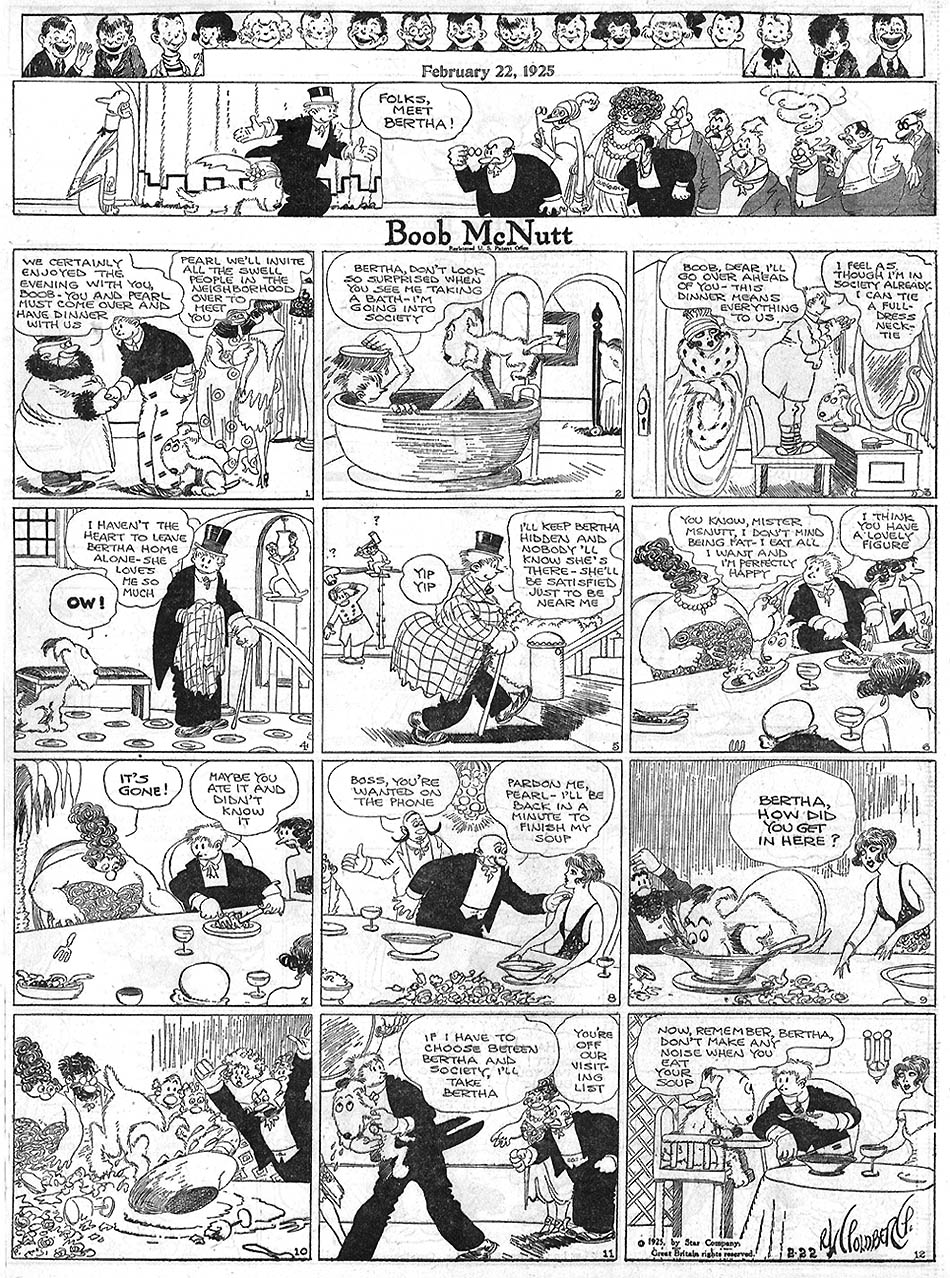
Rube Goldberg's Boob McNutt (February 22, 1925)

Boob McNutt was a comic strip by Rube Goldberg which ran from June 9, 1918 to September 23, 1934. It was syndicated by the McNaught Syndicate from 1922 until the end of its run.

== Publication history ==
Comics historian Don Markstein traced the history of the strip:

Goldberg launched Boob McNutt in 1915, but it wasn't immediately picked up for syndication. On June 9, 1918, the Star Company (a Hearst subsidiary and therefore a corporate sibling to the nascent King Features Syndicate) began distributing it nationwide. Boob McNutt started as a series of oneshot gags, which usually ended with Boob being tortured to death for his innocently destructive ways; but before long, week-to-week continuity was added. In 1922, he met the love of his life, Pearl, and the focus shifted to his quest to win her hand in marriage. The task was accomplished in 1926, but they were soon divorced. They went through a few more cycles of courtship, marriage and divorce. Mike and Ike, stars of an earlier Goldberg strip, became supporting characters (they turned out to be Boob's uncles) for a time in the late 1920s, as did Bertha the Siberian Cheesehound (who had started out... as star of the page's topper). In the late 1920s and early '30s, the topper's star was a likeable but shiftless young man named Bill, while in the main part of the page, Boob and Pearl carried on a zany, over-the-top soap opera—but the feature seemed to be running out of steam. Or maybe Goldberg was tiring of it, which amounts to the same thing. Boob blundered into a fortune in 1932, but that didn't perk things up. At the beginning of 1934, Bill took on a co-star—Prof. Lucifer Gorgonzola Butts, inventor, thus adding the famous Goldberg devices to the page's appeal. Even so, it folded in September of that year.

== Story and characters ==
Boob McNutt was a clumsy, buffoonish fellow who was quite friendly and attempted to be helpful in his incompetent way. He was entrusted with tasks like caring for priceless works of art and the Elixir of Immortality, tasks in which he inevitably failed, usually in a destructive manner.

From 1922 to 1926, the strip focused on Boob's pursuit of his true love Pearl, whom he finally married, then divorced, then married again and divorced again. Goldberg inserted supporting characters from his other strips, including Mike and Ike (They Look Alike) and Bertha the Siberian Cheesehound. In 1934, he even brought in Professor Lucifer Gorgonzola Butts, inventor of those famed Rube Goldberg machines, for a brief sojourn before the strip was cancelled.

The strip had several Sunday toppers over the course of its run, including: Bertha the Siberian Cheesehound (Jan 10-July 4, 1926), Bill and Professor Butts (July 11, 1926 - Sept 23, 1934), Boob McNutt's Ark (Jan 8, 1933 - Feb 4, 1934), Are You Saving Jokers? (Feb 11-May 13, 1934) and Boob McNutt's Geography (May 20-Sept 23, 1934).

== Legacy ==
In his seminal 1923 essay, "The Seven Lively Arts", Gilbert Seldes called Boob McNutt "the least worthy of Rube Goldberg's astonishing creations". Boob was vindicated, however, when he was featured on the front cover of Nemo #24.

In the Season 21 episode of American Dad!, "The Girl Who Cried Space Jam", Hayley Smith's public domain cartoon character team includes her husband Jeff dressed in a Boob McNutt costume.

== Sources ==
- Strickler, Dave. Syndicated Comic Strips and Artists, 1924-1995: The Complete Index. Cambria, California: Comics Access, 1995. ISBN 0-9700077-0-1
