= R. C. Harvey =

American author, critic and cartoonist (1937–2022)

- Born: Robert C. Harvey; May 31, 1937; Fargo, North Dakota, U.S
- Died: July 7, 2022 (aged 85)
- Education: University of Colorado Boulder
- Awards: Inkpot Award (2018)
- Website: http://www.rcharvey.com/

Robert C. Harvey (May 31, 1937 – July 7, 2022) was an American author, critic and cartoonist. He wrote a number of books on the history and theory of cartooning, with special focus on the comic strip. He also worked as a freelance cartoonist.

== Early life ==
Harvey said that he had drawn cartoons since age 7. He received a B.A. at the University of Colorado, where he submitted cartoons to the campus humor magazine, The Flatiron. Upon graduation in 1959, Harvey attempted to earn a living as a freelance cartoonist in New York; he was interrupted in his attempt by service in the U.S. Navy from 1960 to 1963. During his service, Harvey was paymaster aboard the USS Saratoga.

== Career ==
Upon his discharge, he became a high-school English teacher for five years (1964–1969) before spending 30 years as a convention manager for the National Council of Teachers of English. He received a Master's Degree in English at New York University in 1968, and a Ph.D. in English literature from the University of Illinois Urbana-Champaign in 1978. While at NCTE, he freelanced cartoons to magazines, 1978–1982.

In 1973, Harvey began writing about comics and cartooning for The Menomonee Falls Gazette. In 1976, Harvey's columns began appearing in The Comics Journal, where he had a regular column. The 1990s saw publication of Fantagraphics Books' Cartoons of the Roaring Twenties in two volumes, collected and edited by Harvey. Harvey was also a contributor to Oxford University Press' American National Biography, providing biographies of a couple dozen cartoonists. In 1994, Harvey's first work of comics scholarship The Art of the Funnies was published by the University Press of Mississippi with The Art of the Comic Book following in 1996. He served as an associate editor for the journal Inks: Cartoon and Comic Art Studies, taking responsibility for submissions related to the comic strip. In 1998, Harvey was guest curator for the Children of the Yellow Kid exhibition at the Frye Museum in Seattle, for which he also provided the catalogue.

Harvey wrote or collected and edited thirteen books on comics and cartooning, including his Milton Caniff: Conversations (2002) from the University Press of Mississippi, followed by a full biography of Caniff, Meanwhile... A Biography of Milton Caniff, Creator of Terry and the Pirates and Steve Canyon (2007) published by Fantagraphics. His most recent book is Insider Histories of Cartooning: Rediscovering Forgotten Famous Comics and Their Creators (2014) from UPM. A complete list of his books appears at his website. Harvey also interviewed cartoonists for the long-running quarterly magazine Cartoonist PROfiles, and he contributed a column for a brief time to the Comics Buyer's Guide.

Harvey was a member of the National Cartoonists Society (NCS) as well as an associate member of the Association of American Editorial Cartoonists (AAEC).

He received the following awards: All-Navy Cartoonist, 1960; the AAEC Ink Bottle Award "in recognition of dedicated service to the Association and distinguished efforts to promote the art of editorial cartooning," 2013; San Diego Comic-Con's Inkpot Award "for achievement in comic arts," 2018.

== Personal life ==
Harvey married Linda née Kubicek in 1971. They had twin daughters, Julia (Jill) and Katherine (Kit), born in May 1975.

In late June 2022, Harvey fell and broke six ribs, and, on July 7, 2022, he died at age 85 from complications of the fall.
