= Alley Oop =

American comic strip

- On April 9, 1939, Alley Oop was transported from the Bone Age into the 20th century.
- Author(s): V. T. Hamlin (creator); Dave Graue; Jack Bender and Carole Bender; Joey Alison Sayers and Jonathan Lemon
- Current status/schedule: Running
- Launch date: December 5, 1932
- Syndicate(s): Bonnet-Brown (1932–33); Newspaper Enterprise Association (1933–2011); Universal Uclick/Andrews-McMeel Syndication (2011–present)
- Publisher(s): Whitman, Dragon Lady Press, Kitchen Sink Press, Dark Horse
- Genre(s): Humor, adventure, prehistoric, science fiction

Alley Oop is a syndicated comic strip created December 5, 1932, by American cartoonist V. T. Hamlin, who wrote and drew the strip through four decades for Newspaper Enterprise Association. Hamlin introduced a cast of colorful characters and his storylines entertained with a combination of adventure, fantasy, and humor. Alley Oop, the strip's title character, is a sturdy citizen in the prehistoric kingdom of Moo. He rides his pet dinosaur Dinny, carries a stone axe, and wears only a fur loincloth.

Alley Oop's name was derived from the French phrase allez, hop! ("here we go"). In the 1933 press release that accompanied the launching of the strip with its new distributor NEA, Hamlin was quoted as saying "I really can't recall just how I struck upon the name 'Alley Oop', although it might be from the fact that the name is a French term used by tumblers. Alley Oop really is a roughhouse tumbler." The name of Alley's girlfriend, Ooola, was a play on a different French phrase: oh là là.

== Story ==
The first stories took place in the fictional "Bone Age" (similar to the Stone Age) and centered on Alley Oop's dealings with his fellow cavemen in the kingdom of Moo. Oop and his pals had occasional skirmishes with the rival kingdom of Lem, ruled by King Tunk. The names Moo and Lem are references to the fabled lost continents of Mu and Lemuria.

On April 5, 1939, Hamlin introduced a new plot device which greatly expanded his choice of storylines: A time machine was invented by 20th-century scientist Dr. Elbert Wonmug; the name Wonmug was a pun on Albert Einstein, as "ein" is German for "one" and a "stein" is a type of drinking mug.

Oop was transported to the 20th century by an early test of the machine (in the daily strip of April 8 and the Sunday strip of April 9, 1939). He became Dr. Wonmug's man in the field, embarking on expeditions to various periods in history, such as Ancient Egypt, the England of Robin Hood, and the American frontier. Oop met historical or mythical figures such as Cleopatra, King Arthur, and Ulysses in his adventures. In addition to the time machine, other science-fiction devices were introduced. Oop once drove an experimental electric-powered race car, and he has space-traveled to Venus, the moon (twice), and "Earth-Two". During his adventures, he was often accompanied by his girlfriend Ooola and by the sometimes-villainous, sometimes-heroic George Oscar Boom (G. O. Boom). Laboratory assistant Ava Peckedge joined the cast in 1986.

== Syndication history ==
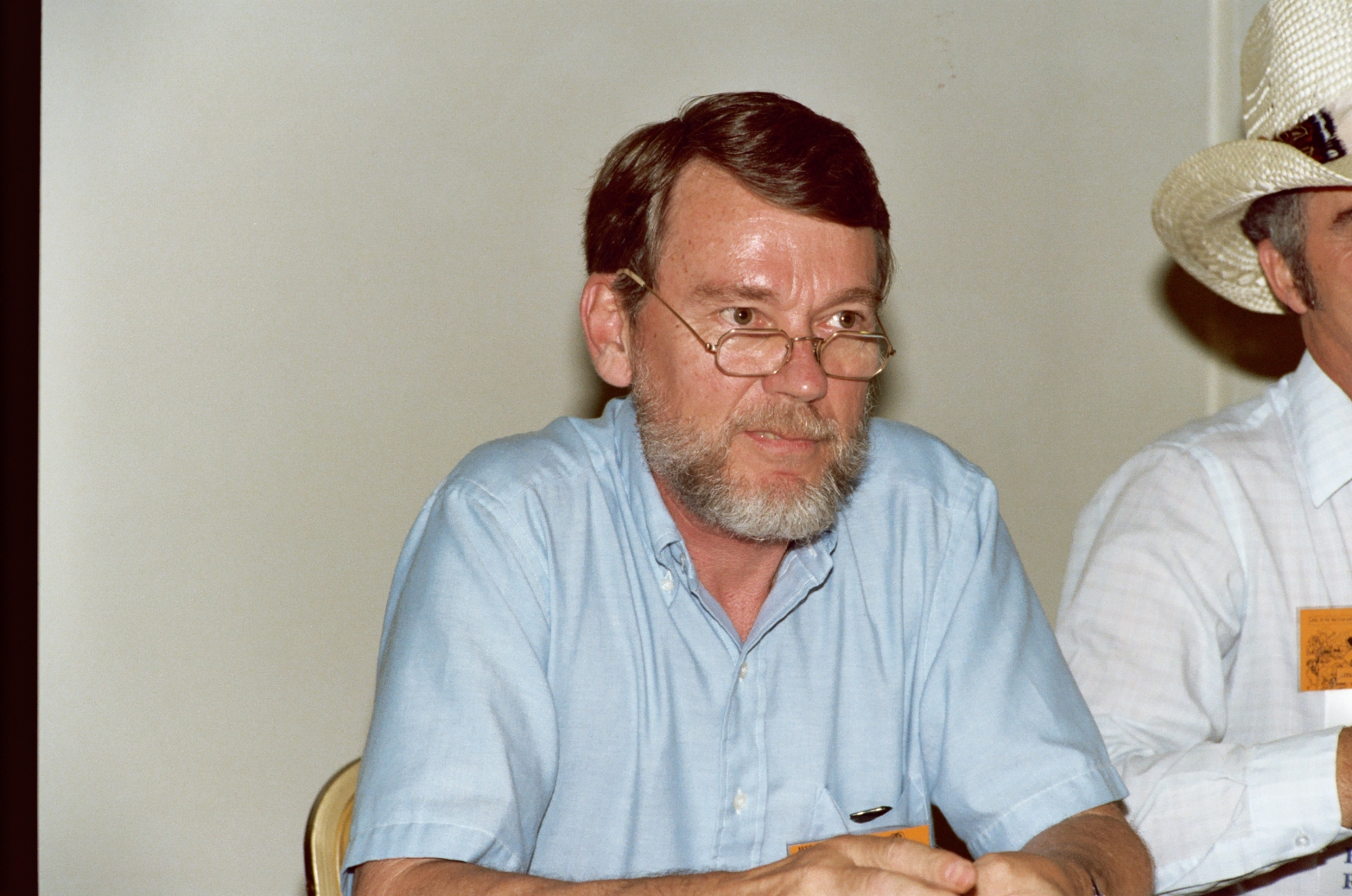
Dave Graue, Hamlin's successor

Alley Oop was first distributed by the small syndicate Bonnet-Brown on December 5, 1932, but this run ended on April 26, 1933, when Bonnet-Brown became defunct. NEA picked up the strip and, starting on August 7, 1933, the earlier material was reworked for a larger readership. A full-page Sunday strip was added on September 9, 1934; the strip also appeared in half-page, tabloid, and half-tab formats, which were smaller and/or dropped panels. During World War II, newspapers eliminated full-page comics to save paper; starting on December 1, 1940, Alley Oop's Sunday comic was offered in a smaller format which could, at an editor's discretion, be further reconfigured to save space. Daily comics were first reduced in size on April 20, 1942, and have become smaller since then, but they have been appearing in color since September 15, 2008.

When Hamlin retired in 1971, his assistant Dave Graue took over. Graue had been assisting Hamlin since 1950 (starting as a letterer) and creating the daily solo since July 15, 1966, although co-signed by Hamlin. Hamlin's last signed daily strip appeared December 31, 1972, and his last signed Sunday was April 1, 1973. Through the 1970s and 1980s, Graue wrote and drew the strip from his North Carolina studio. In 1974 Graue retained an assistant, Dave Olson, to ink and letter the strips. Olson worked on the strip until his retirement at the end of 1990; starting in 1991, Graue hired Jack Bender to finish the daily strips and produce the Sundays.

Graue initially decided to retire at the end of 1991, and the syndicate selected Jack Bender as the strip's new creator. However, Bender was primarily interested in the art chores; he re-hired Graue to stay on as writer and recruited his wife Carole, a calligrapher. This team produced the strip from the last week of December 1991 through the end of August 2001; Graue wrote the strip and thumbnailed the art, from which Jack drew the strip and Carole lettered it. Graue finally retired in 2001, satisfied in having completed fifty years working on the strip. NEA then hired Carole as the new writer, based largely on the strength of an Alley Oop Christmas story that Carole had written and Jack had drawn, separately from the main Alley Oop strip, for the 1997 holiday season. Starting September 3, 2001, Alley Oop Sunday and daily strips were drawn entirely by Jack Bender and written, lettered, and colored by his wife Carole Bender. (On December 10, 2001, the 75-year-old Graue was killed in Flat Rock, North Carolina, when a dump truck hit his car.)

In January 2019, writer Joey Alison Sayers and artist Jonathan Lemon took over the comic.

At its peak, Alley Oop was carried by 800 newspapers. Today, it appears in more than 600 newspapers. The strip and collections of it were popular in Mexico (under the name Trucutú) and in Brazil (Brucutu). In 1995, Alley Oop was one of 20 strips showcased in the Comic Strip Classics series of commemorative United States postage stamps.

== Licensing and promotion ==
In 1978, Alley Oop was adapted to animation as a segment of Filmation's Saturday morning cartoon series Fabulous Funnies, appearing intermittently alongside other comic-strip favorites: The Captain and the Kids, Broom-Hilda, Emmy Lou, Tumbleweeds, and Nancy.

In 2002, Dark Horse Comics produced a limited-edition figure of the character in a brightly illustrated tin container. Alley Oop was issued as statue #28 — part of their line of Classic Comic Characters collectibles.

In 2008, to celebrate Alley Oop's 75th year, the Benders conducted a contest for "Dinosaur Drawings from Our Young Readers". The entry Tyrannosaurus rex holding a banner wishing "Happy Birthday" to Alley Oop, by 12 year-old Erin Holloway of Hammond, Louisiana, was published in the comic strip on January 17, 2009.

== In popular culture ==
The long-running success of the strip made the character a pop culture icon referred to in fiction, pop music and dance:

- The Belgian comic-strip series Suske en Wiske, by Willy Vandersteen, features a caveman inspired by Alley Oop.
- An educated Neanderthal known as "Alley Oop" is a character in Clifford D. Simak's science-fiction novel The Goblin Reservation, published in 1968.
- "O. Paley" (whose name was a loose anagram of "Alley Oop") was the central figure in Philip José Farmer's The Alley Man, a 1959 novella about the last Neanderthal who has survived into the 20th century.
- The character was the subject of the 1960 number-one single "Alley Oop", which was the only hit for the short-lived studio band The Hollywood Argyles. It was written and composed in 1957 by Dallas Frazier. Musicians on the record included Kim Fowley and Sandy Nelson. The song was later covered, most famously by the Bonzo Dog Doo-Dah Band but also by Dante & the Evergreens, The Royal Guardsmen, Sha-Na-Na, The Beach Boys, Dave Van Ronk and George Thorogood & the Destroyers, and it was included in choreographer Twyla Tharp's 1970s ballet Deuce Coupe.
- Alley Oop is mentioned in the 1971 David Bowie song Life on Mars.
- There is an Alley Oop museum and fantasy land theme park in Iraan, Texas
- The Hotel Pattee in Hamlin's hometown of Perry, Iowa honors the cartoonist with an Alley Oop themed guest room.

== Main characters ==
A main character is one who is a fixture of a particular setting. For example, King Guz and Queen Umpa are always present in ancient Moo, even if they are not central to every storyline.

Although Ooola is "Alley Oop's girlfriend", and their jealousy of potential rivals has driven many storylines, they rarely showed each other affection prior to the Benders' run. (More often, Ooola did serious violence to Alley's cranium.) For the first 69 years of the strip's existence, the two kissed only twice: once on August 14, 1945, as a last goodbye when they believed they were going to be drowned, and again on September 28, 1999, when Ooola pecked Alley on the cheek as thank-you for a timely rescue. The Benders made the couple more physically affectionate and even brought them to the altar—but, when they reached that point, Alley and Ooola decided that they made better friends than spouses.

Doctor Wonmug was drawn to look identical to the Grand Wizer. By the end of Dave Graue's tenure, Wonmug and the Wizer had been in each other's company five times; in each instance, the story was told as though the two characters had never met before, and the characters' identical appearances were remarked upon (May 26, 1945; December 7, 1960; July 17, 1963; July 30, 1965; September 24, 1970). The Benders addressed the similarity twice (on October 6, 2006, and March 23, 2007) by subverting it; that is, the other characters exclaimed that the two looked the same, but both the Wizer and Wonmug scoffed and claimed not to see any resemblance. In the daily strip on June 21, 1969, Wonmug's birthdate is given as May 10, 1900 (which was also V.T. Hamlin's birthday).

Dinny, Alley Oop's pet dinosaur, was designed as an amalgam of different features and was not meant to resemble any known dinosaur. Dinny's species is identified as a "Cartoonosaurus" in the daily strip on April 12, 1968.

Name	First Appeared	Description
Alley Oop	August 7, 1933	A time-traveling caveman
Dinny	August 12, 1933	Oop's pet dinosaur
King Guzzle	September 8, 1933	Ruler of Moo
Foozy	September 21, 1933	Oop's pal, who talks in rhyme
Pooky, the Grand Wizer	September 23, 1933	Advisor to the king
Queen Umpateedle	September 28, 1933	Queen of Moo
Ooola	October 10, 1933	Oop's girlfriend
Dr. Elbert Wonmug	April 7, 1939	20th-century scientist and inventor
G. Oscar Boom	February 28, 1940	Rival and partner to Wonmug
Avery S. Peckedge ("Ava")	August 21, 1986	Dr. Wonmug's laboratory assistant
Penelope	February 9, 2020	Time-traveling child scientist (Sundays only)

== Supporting characters ==
New stories typically introduced new characters, especially when those stories were set outside of Moo. Therefore, a "supporting character" is one who has been featured across multiple storylines.

Eeny, the dictator, was a transparent representation of Adolf Hitler. In her first story, in 1937, she recruited "hairshirts", taught them a familiar arm-raised salute, and installed herself as "dictator" while leaving Queen Umpa as a figurehead ruler. In her second story, in 1942, she and her "Moozys", headed by the armbanded "Moostapo", overran the country and herded its citizens into "concentration caves."

The Lemian King was inconsistent during Hamlin's run. King Tunk first appeared in 1934 as a bald man with a stubbled chin, and he remained so through 1938. In 1944, this same character was named Wur rather than Tunk, although Sawalla's King Wur had previously been featured in storylines alongside King Tunk. When Lem was re-introduced in 1954, its king was named Tunk but was clean-shaven and had a full head of hair; the Lemian king returned to his original design in 1959 but was again called Wur. He regained the name Tunk in 1961 (giving his full name as "Clab Tunk" on May 22, 1961) and from then on it stuck.

Dave Wowee, Wonmug's great-great-great-grandson, was named in honor of (and drawn to resemble) Dave Graue, who typically told people that his last name "rhymes with Wowee".

Name	First Appeared	Description
Wootietoot	September 28, 1933	Guz and Umpa's daughter
Clab Tunk	March 21, 1934	Ruler of Lem
Dootsy Bobo	May 7, 1934	Moovian mischief-maker and rival for Ooola's affections
Wur	May 26, 1936	Ruler of Sawalla
Eeny	December 28, 1937	Stone-age analog for Hitler
Zel	September 3, 1938	Ooola's cousin and Foozy's wife (married on February 20, 1939)
Jon	April 7, 1939	Dr. Wonmug's lab assistant, named for V.T.'s son Jonathan
Dee	April 15, 1939	Dr. Wonmug's daughter, named for V.T.'s wife Dorothy
G.I. Tum	June 24, 1939	Federal agent
Dr. Amos Bronson	July 22, 1939	Historian and Wonmug's friend
Moe, Beau, and Joe	January 27, 1943	Foozy's triplets
Eustace	November 20, 1953	Alley's warhorse
Sonny Boy	June 11, 1954	Dinny's descendant, a twenty-or-so-million-year-old dragon
Brunnehilde	August 11, 1954	Doc Wonmug's barbarian love interest
Jack East	February 25, 1957	Riverboat gambler
Oxy Twenty-Four	January 14, 1959	An ancient moon-man
The Gink	September 15, 1970	A mind-reading Bigfoot
Toko	January 31, 1972	a young Moovian boy
Ferdy	February 19, 1978	a good-natured Moovian with much brawn but little brain (Sundays only)
Wanda the Witch ("Granny")	January 18, 1979	A practitioner of magic arts and the Wizer's peer
Dave Wowee	September 21, 2002	Doc Wonmug's great-great-great-grandson from 2145

== Collections and reprints ==
=== Books ===
Title	Publication year	Publisher	Dates reprinted
Alley Oop: The Sawalla Chronicles	1983	Ken Pierce Inc.	April 10 – August 28, 1936 (a few strips omitted)
Alley Oop by Dave Graue	1983	TOR Publications	May 14, July 6–13, Sept 18–20, November 24 – December 31, 1979; January 1 – February 4, 1980; September 8 – December 1, 1981; April 5–24, April 28 – June 12, 1982
Alley Oop Volume 1: The Adventures of a Time-Traveling Caveman	1990	Kitchen Sink Press	July 20, 1946 – June 20, 1947
Alley Oop Volume 2: The Sphinx and Alley Oop	1991	Kitchen Sink Press	June 21, 1947 – August 30, 1948
Alley Oop Volume 3: First Trip to the Moon	1995	Kitchen Sink Press	August 31, 1948 – November 9, 1949
Alley Oop: Book 4	2003	Manuscript Press	November 10, 1949 – November 10, 1950
The Library of American Comics Essentials Volume 4: Alley Oop 1939: The First Time Travel Adventure	2014	Idea & Design Works' The Library of American Comics	March 6, 1939 – March 23, 1940
Alley Oop: The Complete Sundays Volume 1	2014	Dark Horse	September 9, 1934 – December 27, 1936
Alley Oop: The Complete Sundays Volume 2	2014	Dark Horse	January 3, 1937 – April 30, 1939
Alley Oop Goes Modern: The Complete Sundays Volume 3	2022	Acoustic Learning	May 7, 1939 – December 28, 1941
Alley Oop In World War II: The Complete Sundays Volume 4	2023	Acoustic Learning	January, 1942 – August, 1944
Alley Oop: The Atomic Age: Complete Sundays 1944–1950	2026	Acoustic Learning	September, 1944 – December, 1950, excepting strips already reprinted in Atlantis (1946) and Julius Caesar (1949–50)
Alley Oop In TV Land: Complete Sundays 1951–1955	2026	Acoustic Learning	January, 1951 – December, 1955
Alley Oop: The Silver Age: Complete Sundays 1956–1960	2026	Acoustic Learning	January, 1956 – December, 1960
Alley Oop Goes Pop: Complete Sundays 1961–1965	2026	Acoustic Learning	January, 1961 – December, 1965
Rollerboning with Alley Oop: The Complete Sundays 1976–1978	2024	Acoustic Learning	January 1976 – December 1978
Alley Oop Against the Outlanders: The Complete Sundays 1979–1981	2024	Acoustic Learning	January 1979 – December 1981
Alley Oop In the Land of Giants: The Complete Sundays 1982–1984	2023	Acoustic Learning	January 1982 – December 1984
Alley Oop and Mini-Dinny: The Complete Sundays 1985–1987	2024	Acoustic Learning	January 1985 – December 1987
Alley Oop and the Cave Monster: The Complete Sundays 1988–1990	2026	Acoustic Learning	January 1988 – December 1990
Alley Oop and the Changeling: The Complete Sundays 1991–1993	2026	Acoustic Learning	January 1991 – December 1993
Alley Oop and the Dinosaur from Outer Space: The Complete Sundays 1994–1996	2025	Acoustic Learning	January 1994 – December 1996
Alley Oop and the Magic Staff: The Complete Sundays 1997–1999	2025	Acoustic Learning	January 1997 – December 1999
Alley Oop Meets Earlie Oop: The Complete Sundays 2000–2002	2025	Acoustic Learning	January 2000 – December 2002
Alley Oop Is Ooperman: The Complete Sundays 2003–2005	2025	Acoustic Learning	January 2003 – December 2005
Alley Oop and Dinny	2022	Acoustic Learning	December 5, 1932 – April 26, 1933 (aka Bonnet–Brown #1–120); August 7 – December 31, 1933
War with Lem	2022	Acoustic Learning	January 1 – December 31, 1934
Invasion of Moo	2022	Acoustic Learning	January 1 – December 31, 1935
Sawalla	2022	Acoustic Learning	January 1 – December 31, 1936
Chief Bighorn	2022	Acoustic Learning	January 1 – December 31, 1937
Mootoo	2022	Acoustic Learning	January 1 – December 31, 1938
Alley Oop: The First Time-Travel Adventures	2024	Acoustic Learning	January 1, 1939 – December 31, 1942
Alley Oop and the Sword of Genghis Khan	2025	Acoustic Learning	January 1 – December 31, 1943
Alley Oop and King Solomon's Mines	2025	Acoustic Learning	January 1 – December 31, 1944
Alley Oop In Ancient China	2025	Acoustic Learning	January 1 – December 31, 1945
Alley Oop In the Ancient Lost Atlantis (includes color Sunday strips for Atlantis story)	2025	Acoustic Learning	January 1 – December 31, 1946
Alley Oop Meets Napoleon	2025	Acoustic Learning	January 1 – December 31, 1947
Alley Oop In Egypt	2025	Acoustic Learning	January 1 – December 31, 1948
Alley Oop Meets Julius Caesar (includes daily and color Sunday strips)	2025	Acoustic Learning	January 1, 1949 – December 31, 1950
Alley Oop Is Gladiator XVIII	2025	Acoustic Learning	January 1 – December 31, 1951
Alley Oop In Witchland	2026	Acoustic Learning	January 1 – December 31, 1952
Alley Oop Meets Macbeth	2026	Acoustic Learning	January 1 – December 31, 1953
Alley Oop and the Dragon of Iron Castle	2023	Acoustic Learning	January 1 – December 31, 1954
Alley Oop and the Tiger Tail Transplant	2023	Acoustic Learning	January 1 – December 31, 1955
Alley Oop Races Blarney Goldfield	2023	Acoustic Learning	January 1 – December 31, 1956
Alley Oop On the Mississippi	2023	Acoustic Learning	January 1 – December 31, 1957
Alley Oop: Back to the Moon	2023	Acoustic Learning	January 1 – December 31, 1958
Alley Oop and the Million-Dollar Nugget	2023	Acoustic Learning	January 1 – December 31, 1959
Alley Oop and the Fountain of Youth	2024	Acoustic Learning	January 1 – December 31, 1960
Alley Oop Versus the Moonmen	2024	Acoustic Learning	January 1 – December 31, 1961
Alley Oop and the Brain Butcher	2024	Acoustic Learning	January 1 – December 31, 1962
Alley Oop and the Dragon of Silene	2024	Acoustic Learning	January 1 – December 31, 1963
Alley Oop On Mount Olympus	2024	Acoustic Learning	January 1 – December 31, 1964
Alley Oop: The Ice Age	2024	Acoustic Learning	January 1 – December 31, 1965
Alley Oop and the Man from 2166	2025	Acoustic Learning	January 1 – December 31, 1966
Alley Oop and the Neanderthals	2025	Acoustic Learning	January 1 – December 31, 1967
Alley Oop In Youtopia	2025	Acoustic Learning	January 1 – December 31, 1968
Alley Oop and the Beanstalk	2025	Acoustic Learning	January 1 – December 31, 1969
Alley Oop and the Fabulous Ghost Racer	2025	Acoustic Learning	January 1 – December 31, 1970
Alley Oop and the Mad Mod Mechanical Man	2025	Acoustic Learning	January 1 – December 31, 1971
Alley Oop and Sir Clank of Far Outman	2025	Acoustic Learning	January 1 – December 31, 1972
Alley Oop on the Island of Dinnys	2025	Acoustic Learning	January 1 – December 31, 1973
Alley Oop and Han Sin's Kite	2022	Acoustic Learning	January 1 – December 31, 1974
Alley Oop and the Thorn King of Nerr	2022	Acoustic Learning	January 1 – December 31, 1975
Alley Oop and the Hunt for the Texas Pterosaurs	2022	Acoustic Learning	January 1 – December 31, 1976
Alley Oop and the Great Moovian Migration	2022	Acoustic Learning	January 1 – December 31, 1977
Alley Oop on the Planet of Delfon	2022	Acoustic Learning	January 1 – December 31, 1978
Alley Oop In Wonderland	2022	Acoustic Learning	January 1 – December 31, 1979
Alley Oop and The Seven Cities of Gold	2023	Acoustic Learning	January 1 – December 31, 1980
Alley Oop Meets Draculina	2023	Acoustic Learning	January 1 – December 31, 1981
Alley Oop On the Trail of the Swamp Fox	2023	Acoustic Learning	January 1 – December 31, 1982
Alley Oop Versus the Black Knight	2023	Acoustic Learning	January 1 – December 31, 1983
Alley Oop and the First Prehistoric Olympic Games	2023	Acoustic Learning	January 1 – December 31, 1984
Alley Oop and the Captive Prince	2023	Acoustic Learning	January 1 – December 31, 1985
Alley Oop In the Land of No Return	2024	Acoustic Learning	January 1 – December 31, 1986
Alley Oop: Under the Sea	2024	Acoustic Learning	January 1 – December 31, 1987
Alley Oop and the Hubots of Talaxia	2024	Acoustic Learning	January 1 – December 31, 1988
Alley Oop Meets Fang	2024	Acoustic Learning	January 1 – December 31, 1989
Alley Oop and the Monarchs of Gorp	2024	Acoustic Learning	January 1 – December 31, 1990
Alley Oop In Sparta	2024	Acoustic Learning	January 1 – December 31, 1991
Alley Oop and the Beast of the Woods	2024	Acoustic Learning	January 1 – December 31, 1992
Alley Oop and the Art Invasion	2024	Acoustic Learning	January 1 – December 31, 1993
Alley Oop and the Mesmeric Menace	2024	Acoustic Learning	January 1 – December 31, 1994
Alley Oop Versus the Nightlings	2024	Acoustic Learning	January 1 – December 31, 1995
Alley Oop and the Fire Goddess	2024	Acoustic Learning	January 1 – December 31, 1996
Alley Oop and the Minotaur	2024	Acoustic Learning	January 1 – December 31, 1997
Alley Oop and the Zan of Zoron	2025	Acoustic Learning	January 1 – December 31, 1998
Alley Oop and the Counterfeit Queen	2025	Acoustic Learning	January 1 – December 31, 1999
Alley Oop and the Mighty Kafrak	2025	Acoustic Learning	January 1 – December 31, 2000
Alley Oop and the Slavers	2025	Acoustic Learning	January 1 – December 31, 2001
Alley Oop and the Trojan Dinosaur	2025	Acoustic Learning	January 1, 2002 – December 31, 2007
Happy Birthday Alley Oop	2025	Acoustic Learning	January 1, 2008 – December 31, 2013
Alley Oop and the Prehistoric Air Force	2025	Acoustic Learning	January 1, 2014 – September 1, 2018
Alley Oop in the Raptor 500	2025	Acoustic Learning	January 1, 2021 – December 31, 2022

=== Magazines ===
In addition to the magazines mentioned in the table below, Comics Revue has also reprinted Alley Oop daily and Sunday strips. The Menomonee Falls Guardian, published weekly, reprinted one week of daily strips in each issue. The Menomonee Falls Guardian Special #1–3 were sold separately; Special #4 was an insert included with issue #100.

Title	Publication year	Publisher	Dates reprinted
The Menomonee Falls Guardian Special issues 1–4	1973–1975	Street Enterprises	October 2, 1973 – July 27, 1974 (December 25, 1973, omitted)
The Menomonee Falls Guardian issues 2–59	July 2, 1973 – August 5, 1974	Street Enterprises	January 3, 1949 – February 11, 1950
The Menomonee Falls Guardian issues 60–146	August 12, 1974 – May 3, 1976	Street Enterprises	July 29, 1974 – March 27, 1976
Favorite Funnies issues 1–12	September 14 – November 30, 1973	Dynapubs Enterprises	May 12 – August 2, 1941 (one week of daily strips per weekly issue)
Storyline Strips (75 issues)	August 1997 – September 2000	American Publishing Corp.	Two weeks of current daily strips per weekly issue
Yesterday's Comics issue 3	1974	Nostalgia Inc.	April 3–15, 1939
Nemo Classics Comics Library issue 6	1984	Fantagraphics	Sunday strips: September 9, 1934; January 6 and November 24, 1935; December 12, 1937; January 8, April 2, 9, 16, October 8, and November 19, 1939
Alley Oop #1: The Legend Begins	1987	Dragon Lady Press	August 7, 1933 – January 27, 1934
Alley Oop #2: Enter the Time Machine	1987	Dragon Lady Press	March 6, 1939 – October 25, 1939
Alley Oop #3: Oop vs. Hercules	1988	Dragon Lady Press	October 26, 1939 – July 30, 1940
Alley Oop Magazine #0 (Introductory issue)	1997	Spec Productions	December 5, 1932 – January 3, 1933; August 7 – September 2, 1933; December 19, 1993 – February 20, 1994 (Sundays); September 15 – November 8, 1980
Alley Oop Magazine #1	1998	Spec Productions	July 3 - September 28, 1940; September 8–13, 1941; June 5–13, 1962; February 27 – March 27, 1994 & May 7, 1995 (Sundays); November 10 - December 25, 1980
Alley Oop Magazine #2	1998	Spec Productions	January 9–30, 1933 & Bonnet–Brown #49–75; August 4 – December 22, 1996 (Sundays); September 30 – November 25, 1940
Alley Oop Magazine #3	1998	Spec Productions	November 26, 1940 – May 31, 1941
Alley Oop Magazine #4	1998	Spec Productions	Bonnet–Brown #75–101; April 10 – September 18, 1994 (Sundays); May 30 – August 5, 1983; June 3 – July 7, 1941
Alley Oop Magazine #5	1998	Spec Productions	August 8 – October 11, 1983; July 9 – October 21, 1941
Alley Oop Magazine #6	1999	Spec Productions	October 21, 1941 – April 21, 1942
Alley Oop Magazine #7	2000	Spec Productions	April 21 – August 13, 1942; January 16 – March 26, 1991
Alley Oop Magazine #8	2000	Spec Productions	August 14, 1942 – January 16, 1943; March 27 – April 15, 1991
Alley Oop Magazine #9	2000	Spec Productions	January 16 – May 1, 1943; April 16 – July 6, 1991
Alley Oop Magazine #10	2000	Spec Productions	May 3 – October 27, 1943
Alley Oop Magazine #11	2001	Spec Productions	October 28, 1943 – May 13, 1944
Alley Oop Magazine #12	2001	Spec Productions	May 15 – November 21, 1944
Alley Oop Magazine #13	2002	Spec Productions	Bonnet–Brown #102–120; November 22, 1944 – January 27, 1945; December 2, 1981 – February 6, 1982
Alley Oop Magazine #14	2002	Spec Productions	January 29 – June 30, 1945; February 10 – March 31, 2002 (Sundays)
Alley Oop Magazine #15	2002	Spec Productions	July 2, 1945 – January 11, 1946
Alley Oop Magazine #16	2003	Spec Productions	January 12 – July 19, 1946 (includes color Sundays from April 7 – June 2); September 23 & 27 and Sunday, December 1, 2002
Alley Oop Magazine #17	2003	Spec Productions	November 11, 1950 – May 21, 1951
Alley Oop Magazine #18	2004	Spec Productions	May 22 – December 31, 1951
Alley Oop Magazine #19	2004	Spec Productions	January 1 – July 5, 1952
Alley Oop Magazine #20	2004	Spec Productions	July 7 – December 23, 1952
Alley Oop Magazine #21	2005	Spec Productions	December 24, 1952 – June 13, 1953
Alley Oop Magazine #22	2006	Spec Productions	June 15 – December 31, 1953
Alley Oop Magazine #23	2006	Spec Productions	January 1 – June 30, 1954
Alley Oop Magazine #24	2006	Spec Productions	July 1 – December 30, 1954
Alley Oop Magazine #25	2007	Spec Productions	January 1 – July 1, 1955
Alley Oop Magazine #26	2007	Spec Productions	July 1 – December 31, 1955
Alley Oop Magazine #27	2008	Spec Productions	January 1 – June 30, 1956
Alley Oop Magazine #28	2008	Spec Productions	August 2, 1956 – January 1, 1957
Alley Oop Magazine #29	2010	Spec Productions	January – June, 1957
Alley Oop Magazine #30		Spec Productions	July – December, 1957
Alley Oop Magazine #31		Spec Productions	January – June, 1958
Alley Oop Magazine #32	2012	Spec Productions	July – December, 1958
Alley Oop Magazine #33		Spec Productions	January – June, 1959
Alley Oop Magazine #34	2013	Spec Productions	July – December 31, 1959

=== Comics ===
Various strips have also been reprinted in comic-book form. The comic books tended to alter the original reading experience by colorizing the daily strips as well as rearranging, dropping, cropping or extending panels to fit the format. Recap and exposition panels, as well as strips that served as diversions from the perceived "main story" (such as an interlude of Alley and Foozy discovering how to drive a car while Dr. Wonmug fixed the time machine), were typically excised.

Famous Funnies and The Funnies re-lettered their Sunday-strip reprints, enlarging the text and simplifying the language, so that the comic would be more legible when reduced from tabloid to comic-book size. Although the first seven issues of Red Ryder Comics' Sunday-strip reprints were unaltered, in every subsequent issue the panels were enlarged, redrawn, rearranged or deleted.

The Antarctic Press series featured a combination of original material, direct reprints of newspaper comics, and redrawn adaptations of newspaper-strip stories. The reprints rearranged, resized, and sometimes omitted panels. These reprints and adaptations are noted in the list of storylines.

Issue	Publication Date	Publisher	Dates covered
Famous Funnies #19–25	February–August 1936	Eastern Color Printing Co.	October 28 – December 9, 1934 (one Sunday page per issue)
The Funnies #1	October 1936	Dell Publishing Co.	November 17 – December 8, 1935 (Sundays)
The Funnies #2	November 1936	Dell Publishing Co.	December 15, 1935 – January 6, 1936 (Sundays)
The Funnies #3	December 1936	Dell Publishing Co.	January 13 – February 3, 1936 (Sundays)
The Funnies #4	January 1937	Dell Publishing Co.	February 10–17 & March 1–8, 1936 (Sundays)
The Funnies #5	February 1937	Dell Publishing Co.	March 15 – April 5, 1936 (Sundays)
The Funnies #6	March 1937	Dell Publishing Co.	April 12 – May 3, 1936 (Sundays)
The Funnies #7	April 1937	Dell Publishing Co.	May 10–31, 1936 (Sundays, with panels removed)
The Funnies #8	May 1937	Dell Publishing Co.	June 7–28, 1936 (Sundays, with panels removed)
The Funnies #9	June 1937	Dell Publishing Co.	July 5–26, 1936 (Sundays, with panels removed)
The Funnies #10	July 1937	Dell Publishing Co.	August 2, 23, 30 & September 6, 1936 (Sundays, with panels removed)
The Funnies #11	August 1937	Dell Publishing Co.	September 13 – October 4, 1936 (Sundays, with panels removed)
The Funnies #12	September 1937	Dell Publishing Co.	October 11 – November 1, 1936 (Sundays, with panels removed)
The Funnies #13	October 1937	Dell Publishing Co.	November 8–29, 1936 (Sundays, with panels removed)
The Funnies #14	November 1937	Dell Publishing Co.	December 13–27, 1936 (Sundays, with panels removed)
The Funnies #15	December 1937	Dell Publishing Co.	January 3–24, 1937 (Sundays, with panels removed)
The Funnies #16	January 1938	Dell Publishing Co.	December 6, 1936 & February 7–21, 1937 (Sundays, with panels removed)
The Funnies #17	February 1938	Dell Publishing Co.	February 28 – March 31, 1937 (Sundays, with panels removed)
The Funnies #18	March 1938	Dell Publishing Co.	March 28 – April 18, 1937 (Sundays, with panels removed)
The Funnies #19	April 1938	Dell Publishing Co.	April 25 – May 16, 1937 (Sundays, with panels removed)
The Funnies #20	May 1938	Dell Publishing Co.	May 23 – June 13, 1937 (Sundays, with panels removed)
The Funnies #21	June 1938	Dell Publishing Co.	June 20 – July 11, 1937 (Sundays, with panels removed)
The Funnies #22	July 1938	Dell Publishing Co.	July 18 – August 8, 1937 (Sundays, with panels removed)
The Funnies #23	August 1938	Dell Publishing Co.	August 15 – September 5, 1937 (Sundays, with panels removed)
The Funnies #24	September 1938	Dell Publishing Co.	September 12 – October 3, 1937 (Sundays, with panels removed)
The Funnies #25	October 1938	Dell Publishing Co.	October 10–31, 1937 (Sundays, with panels removed)
The Funnies #26	November 1938	Dell Publishing Co.	November 7–28, 1937 (Sundays, with panels removed)
The Funnies #27	December 1938	Dell Publishing Co.	December 5–26, 1937 (Sundays, with panels removed)
The Funnies #28	January 1939	Dell Publishing Co.	January 2–23, 1937 (Sundays, with panels removed)
The Funnies #29	February 1939	Dell Publishing Co.	January 30 – February 20, 1937 (Sundays, with panels removed)
The Funnies #30	April 1939	Dell Publishing Co.	November 15–27, 1937
The Funnies #31	May 1939	Dell Publishing Co.	November 29 – December 11, 1937
The Funnies #32	June 1939	Dell Publishing Co.	December 13–29, 1938
The Funnies #33	July 1939	Dell Publishing Co.	December 30, 1937 – January 15, 1938
The Funnies #34	August 1939	Dell Publishing Co.	January 17–29, 1938
The Funnies #35	September 1939	Dell Publishing Co.	January 31 – February 12, 1938
The Funnies #36	October 1939	Dell Publishing Co.	February 14 – March 7, 1938
The Funnies #37	November 1939	Dell Publishing Co.	March 8–21, 1938
The Funnies #38	December 1939	Dell Publishing Co.	March 22 – April 6, 1938
The Funnies #39	January 1940	Dell Publishing Co.	April 6–22, 1938
The Funnies #40	February 1940	Dell Publishing Co.	April 22 – May 3, 1938
The Funnies #41	March 1940	Dell Publishing Co.	May 4–16, 1938
The Funnies #42	April 1940	Dell Publishing Co.	May 17–27, 1938
The Funnies #43	May 1940	Dell Publishing Co.	May 27 – June 7, 1938
The Funnies #44	June 1940	Dell Publishing Co.	June 7–17, 1938
The Comics #3	May 1937	Dell Publishing Co.	June 10–21, 1935
The Comics #4	July 1937	Dell Publishing Co.	June 22–29 & July 10–15, 1935
The Comics #5	September 1937	Dell Publishing Co.	July 1–9 & 16–19, 1935
Four Color Comic #3	1938	Dell Publishing Co.	December 11, 1937 – July 19, 1938
Red Ryder Comics #6	April 1942	KK Publications	June 11 & 18, July 2 & 9, 1939 (Sundays)
Red Ryder Comics #7	May/June 1942	KK Publications	July 16 – August 6, 1939 (Sundays)
Red Ryder Comics #8	July/August 1942	KK Publications	August 13 – September 3, 1939 (Sundays)
Red Ryder Comics #9	September/October 1942	KK Publications	September 17 – October 1, 1939 (Sundays)
Red Ryder Comics #10	November/December 1942	KK Publications	October 8–22 & November 5, 1939 (Sundays)
Red Ryder Comics #11	January/February 1943	KK Publications	November 12 – December 3, 1939 (Sundays)
Red Ryder Comics #12	March/April 1943	KK Publications	December 10–31, 1939 (Sundays)
Red Ryder Comics #13	May/June 1943	KK Publications	January 7–28, 1940 (Sundays, panels rearranged)
Red Ryder Comics #14	July/August 1943	KK Publications	January 28 – February 18, 1940 (Sundays, panels rearranged)
Red Ryder Comics #15	September/October 1943	KK Publications	February 18 – March 10, 1940 (Sundays, panels rearranged)
Red Ryder Comics #16	November/December 1943	KK Publications	March 17 – April 7, 1940 (Sundays, panels rearranged)
Red Ryder Comics #17	January/February 1944	KK Publications	April 14 – May 5, 1940 (Sundays, panels rearranged)
Red Ryder Comics #18	March/April 1944	KK Publications	May 12 – June 2, 1940 (Sundays, panels rearranged)
Red Ryder Comics #19	May/June 1944	KK Publications	May 12 – June 30, 1940 (Sundays, panels rearranged)
Red Ryder Comics #20	July/August 1944	KK Publications	July 7–28, 1940 (Sundays, panels rearranged)
Red Ryder Comics #21	September/October 1944	KK Publications	August 4–25, 1940 (Sundays, panels rearranged)
Red Ryder Comics #22	November/December 1944	KK Publications	September 1–22, 1940 (Sundays, panels rearranged)
Red Ryder Comics #23	January/February 1944	KK Publications	September 29 – October 13, 1940 (Sundays, panels rearranged)
Red Ryder Comics #24	March/April 1945	KK Publications	October 20 – November 3, 1940 (Sundays, panels rearranged)
Red Ryder Comics #25	May/June 1945	KK Publications	November 10, 24 & December 1, 1940 (Sundays, panels rearranged)
Red Ryder Comics #26	July/August 1945	KK Publications	December 8 & 15, 1940 (Sundays, panels rearranged)
Red Ryder Comics #27	September/October 1945	KK Publications	December 22 & 29, 1940 (Sundays, panels rearranged)
Red Ryder Comics #28	November 1945	KK Publications	January 5 & 12, 1941 (Sundays, panels rearranged)
Red Ryder Comics #29	December 1945	KK Publications	January 19 & February 16, 1941 (Sundays, panels rearranged)
Red Ryder Comics #30	January 1946	KK Publications	February 23 & March 2, 1941 (Sundays, panels rearranged)
Red Ryder Comics #31	February 1946	KK Publications	March 9 & 16, 1941 (Sundays, panels rearranged)
Red Ryder Comics #32	March 1946	KK Publications	March 23 & 30, 1941 (Sundays, panels rearranged)
Alley Oop #10	September 1947	Visual Editions Inc.	April 15 – November 9, 1935
Alley Oop #11	December 1947	Visual Editions Inc.	November 3 – December 26, 1939; March 15 – April 26, 1940
Alley Oop #12	March 1948	Visual Editions Inc.	
Alley Oop #13	June 1948	Visual Editions Inc.	April 12 – June 21, 1941; July 12 – August 2, 1941
Alley Oop #14	September 1948	Visual Editions Inc.	August 4 – September 22, 1941; October 8 – November 24, 1941
Alley Oop #15	December 1948	Visual Editions Inc.	October 25, 1940 – March 21, 1941
Alley Oop #16	March 1949	Visual Editions Inc.	April 29 – August 1 and November 20–22, 1940
Alley Oop #17	June 1949	Visual Editions Inc.	August 16 – November 24, 1944
Alley Oop #18	October 1949	Visual Editions Inc.	July 29 – December 2, 1946
Alley Oop #1	November 1955	Argo Publishing Co.	June 15 – September 9 and October 24, 1953
Alley Oop #2	January 1956	Argo Publishing Co.	from 1953: dailies September 22 – October 3, October 12–16, October 27 – November 12; Sundays May 24 – June 14 (some panels omitted)
Alley Oop #3	March 1956	Argo Publishing Co.	March 22 – June 5, 1954
Alley Oop Adventures #1	August 1998	Antarctic Press	Two original stories, two adaptations, and one reprint
Alley Oop Adventures #2	October 1998	Antarctic Press	One original story; three original one-page features; two adaptations
Alley Oop Adventures #3	December 1998	Antarctic Press	Two original stories, later adapted into Sunday strips; one original one-page feature; one reprint; one adaptation
Alley Oop Adventures #1	September 1999	Antarctic Press	One original story, later published as Sunday strips; two reprints; one Jack Bender tryout strip, later published as a Sunday strip
Alley Oop Adventures #2	December 1999	Antarctic Press	Three original stories, two later adapted into Sunday strips; one reprint; one Jack Bender tryout strip
Alley Oop Adventures #3	March 2000	Antarctic Press	Two adaptations, one reprint

== Original publications ==
The following publications were original material, not newspaper reprints:

- Alley Oop and Dinny A Big Little Book No. 763 (1935) Whitman Publishing
- Alley Oop in The Invasion of Moo (1935) (Cocomalt Premium) Whitman
- Alley Oop and Dinny in the Jungles of Moo A Big Little Book #1473 (1938) Whitman
- Alley Oop and the Missing King of Moo A Penny Book (1938) Whitman
- Alley Oop and the Cave Men of Moo (Pan-Am Premium) (1938) Whitman
- Alley Oop and the Kingdom of Foo (Pan-Am Premium) (1938) Whitman
- Alley Oop: Taming a Dinosaur (Pan-Am Premium) (1938) Whitman
- Alley Oop sheet music (1960) Kavelin-Maverick Music (USA), Leeds Music (Australia, New Zealand)
- Alley Oop Coloring Book (1962) Treasure Books
- Alley Oop comic book, issues 1–3 (1963) Dell Publishing Co.
- Alley Oop Fun Book (1981) Happy House Books

== Sunday storylines ==
The following table is a list of storylines featured in the Sunday comic strips. The ending of a storyline frequently overlapped with the beginning of the next, and actual story titles were provided only on a few occasions (e.g., "Alley Oop at Crummystone Manor" or "The Perpetual Motion Machine"). The dates and story descriptions given here are, therefore, not official or definitive delineations but may serve as a rough index to the history of the strip. Most of the Sunday strips from November 1996 onward are available on gocomics.com behind a paywall.

The Sunday strips' continuity ran separately from the daily strips until 2006 (with two exceptions, as noted in the list). In the first few years following the time machine's introduction, Hamlin shifted the setting of the Sunday strip, sometimes abruptly, to match that of the daily storyline, but the Sunday and daily strips were entirely different stories, told in parallel, and they did not overlap. For example, when Oop was first brought to the 20th century, the Sunday storyline showed him doing little more than figuring out modern clothing and calmly running a few errands, whereas the daily strip had him roving all around the countryside in cars, trains, and planes, wreaking havoc and making headlines as the "Phantom Ape". If the same events did occur in both continuities, they were always told differently: before the first time-machine story, for example, Alley Oop acquired the Moovian royal jewels; however, in the Sunday strip, Guz voluntarily installed Alley as king (so he could take a vacation), while in the daily strip Alley took the throne by force (as revenge for Guz stealing and eating Dinny's egg).

After 1961, the Sunday strips featured no time travel but were set exclusively in Moo. It is possible that, from 1961 onward, the Sunday stories were meant to have taken place prior to Alley having met the time-machine crew because, in these strips, Alley was shown to be unaware of concepts he had already encountered in the time-travel storylines, such as shoes, or snow, or even the wheel.

Starting in January 2006, through the Benders' retirement in mid-2019, Sunday strips were not new stories but reprinted panels from the previous week's daily strips.

Since late 2019, the artistic team has made the Sunday strips "Little Oop", portraying a young Alley Oop. Little Oop was first set in a land of Moo that is anachronistic in a way similar to the Flintstones' "modern stone age", but he met a time-traveling child named Penelope who brought him to the modern era (on March 1, 2020).

=== Topper strips ===
Alley Oop's Sunday page had different toppers starting with the first strip and running through 1944:

- Dinny's Family Album, September 9, 1934 – February 7, 1937
- Foozy's Limericks, February 21 – May 16, 1937
- Prehistoric Cut-Outs in Modern Dress, May 23 – September 12, 1937
- Fragments, September 19, 1937 – April 9, 1939
- Scientists Say, April 16 – July 2, 1939
- Odds 'n' Ends, July 9, 1939 – April 21, 1940
- Story of a Dinosaur Egg, April 28 – August 25, 1940
- Foozy's Foolosophies, September 1, 1940 – September 5, 1943
- The characters argue over who gets to use the space (breaking the fourth wall), September 12, 1943 – January 2, 1944
- Buy War Bonds cartoon advertisements, January 9 – August 27, 1944

=== Sunday strips ===
==== 1930s ====
Start date	End date	Description
September 9, 1934	October 7, 1934	Alley and Foozy start a trading business (Through the end of 1937, many storylines are driven by the two partners' profit schemes for this business.)
October 14, 1934	November 11, 1934	Guz wants a dinosaur
November 18, 1934		Foozy gives love advice
November 25, 1934		Alley solves the rock pile
December 2, 1934	December 9, 1934	Foozy promotes the Big Fight
December 16, 1934	February 3, 1935	Ama, the land of wild women
February 10, 1935		Foozy the debt collector
February 17, 1935		Oop's animal trap
February 24, 1935	March 3, 1935	Catching a merawow
March 10, 1935		Alley and Foozy play axe-golf
March 17, 1935		Foozy sells some beads
March 24, 1935	April 7, 1935	Umpa goes on a diet
April 14, 1935	May 19, 1935	Alley's new pet dinosaur
May 26, 1935	June 9, 1935	Alley courts Ooola
June 16, 1935		Guz's police report
June 23, 1935	June 30, 1935	Alley goes fishing
July 7, 1935	July 14, 1935	Alley's sore thumb
July 21, 1935	August 18, 1935	gag strips
August 25, 1935	September 29, 1935	Alley and Foozy have a fire sale
October 6, 1935	November 3, 1935	Guz's new robe
November 10, 1935	January 13, 1936	Oop, king of Oompahlan
January 20, 1936	February 10, 1936	gag strips
February 17, 1936	March 15, 1936	Dinosaur hunt
March 22, 1936		Axe-golf with Guz
March 29, 1936	May 3, 1936	Dinosaur egg pranks
May 10, 1936	June 14, 1936	gag strips
June 21, 1936	August 2, 1936	Munitions profiteering in war with Lem
August 9, 1936		Umpa's melon shelf
August 16, 1936	August 23, 1936	Brontosaurus hunt
August 30, 1936		Dinny's day in the jungle
September 7, 1936	September 13, 1936	Foozy lassos a pterodactyl
September 20, 1936		Posies are food for the soul
September 27, 1936	October 4, 1936	Alley annoys Guz and the Wizer
October 11, 1936	October 25, 1936	Foozy vs the Wizer
November 1, 1936	December 27, 1936	Foozy's price war
January 3, 1937	January 10, 1937	Guz's toothache
January 17, 1937	January 24, 1937	Fishing for dinosaurs
January 31, 1937	March 7, 1937	Crossing crocodile creek
March 14, 1937	March 28, 1937	Alley feeds the Moovian army
April 4, 1937	June 20, 1937	Alley's prize fight
June 27, 1937	October 10, 1937	Foozy, tax criminal
October 17, 1937	May 8, 1938	The Royal Moovian Circus
May 15, 1938	June 12, 1938	War with Lem over entertainment fees
June 19, 1938	July 3, 1938	Oop's imaginary jail sentence
July 10, 1938		Fishing with Foozy
July 17, 1938	November 13, 1938	G-man Foozy and Two-Axe Oop: Moovian cop
November 20, 1938	December 11, 1938	The football game: Moo vs Lem
December 18, 1938	January 15, 1939	Oop vs Guz
January 22, 1939	March 26, 1939	gag strips
April 2, 1939	July 16, 1939	Oop meets the 20th century
July 23, 1939	September 17, 1939	Alley Oop, millionaire
September 24, 1939	October 22, 1939	The skeptics visit Moo
October 29, 1939	November 5, 1939	Oop gets a mule
November 12, 1939	December 17, 1939	Escape from Troy

==== 1940s ====
Start date	End date	Description
December 24, 1939	March 24, 1940	Sailing with Eneas
March 31, 1940	June 30, 1940	A visit to Amazonia
July 7, 1940	October 20, 1940	Oop meets Cleopatra
October 27, 1940	November 17, 1940	200 million BC: Earth's second moon explodes
November 24, 1940	April 20, 1941	Oop returns to Cleopatra
April 27, 1941	September 28, 1941	Oop, pirate captain
October 5, 1941	October 26, 1941	Dinny gets stuck in the time-field
November 2, 1941	February 1, 1942	Castle siege in 12th-century England
February 8, 1942	March 22, 1942	The great tournament
March 29, 1942	April 26, 1942	Alley vs King John's troops
May 3, 1942	May 17, 1942	Alley tries to enlist in WWII
May 24, 1942	June 14, 1942	Oop turns invisible
June 21, 1942	September 27, 1942	Alley runs off to fight the war
October 4, 1942	November 22, 1942	Making movies in Moo
November 29, 1942	January 10, 1943	Oop the Hollywood star
January 17, 1943	February 7, 1943	Alley breaks his leg
February 14, 1943	May 9, 1943	Ancient Atlantis
May 16, 1943	July 25, 1943	Mystery of the haunted house
August 1, 1943	September 19, 1943	Spook hunting, round two
September 26, 1943	December 26, 1943	Beach vacation
January 2, 1944	March 19, 1944	Dr. Goo's shrinking potion
March 26, 1944	July 30, 1944	Rollo the brontosaurus
August 6, 1944	August 20, 1944	Oop helps with war production
August 27, 1944	October 15, 1944	Oop vs the USPS
October 22, 1944	November 5, 1944	Alley gets sick
November 12, 1944	May 27, 1945	Alley Oop at Crummystone Manor
June 3, 1945	September 23, 1945	The Perpetual Motion Machine (the time-machine's viewscreen is introduced on September 16)
September 30, 1945	November 18, 1945	Alley meets the Teutonic Cimbrians
November 25, 1945	January 6, 1946	Alley brings home Willie the horse
January 13, 1946	February 3, 1946	Love and marriage in Moo
February 10, 1946	March 10, 1946	Alley and Foozy on the town
March 17, 1946	March 24, 1946	Dinny vs Willie
March 31, 1946	June 2, 1946	(these are integrated with daily-strip continuity)
June 9, 1946	June 16, 1946	Alley retrieves Willie
June 23, 1946	August 11, 1946	Alley rewires the time machine
August 18, 1946	November 24, 1946	Alley meets Aladdin
December 1, 1946	December 22, 1946	Santa's weight-loss program
December 29, 1946	January 19, 1947	Alley's flying carpet ride
January 26, 1947	May 18, 1947	Ooola, the Witch of Red Tower
May 25, 1947	August 10, 1947	By rocket to Antarctica
August 17, 1947	September 7, 1947	Ham the Hermit's Moovian revolution
September 14, 1947	November 2, 1947	Alley and Oscar's prank war
November 9, 1947	November 23, 1947	Alley and the steam shovel
November 30, 1947	January 4, 1947	Alley meets Vikings
January 11, 1947	April 11, 1947	Wu Sing's dragon
April 18, 1948	May 30, 1947	Oop and the beanstalk
June 6, 1948	August 1, 1947	Oop loses his punch
August 8, 1948	October 3, 1948	The dragon in Moo
October 10, 1948	October 31, 1948	Alley becomes invisible
November 7, 1948	January 23, 1949	Invisible Oop fights alongside King Arthur
January 30, 1949	February 13, 1949	Alley gets sick
February 20, 1949	May 1, 1949	Oop vs the Soofoot Indian tribe
May 8, 1949	October 29, 1950	(these are integrated with daily-strip continuity)

==== 1950s ====
Start date	End date	Description
November 5, 1950		Recap
November 12, 1950	February 11, 1951	The Tale of the Butcher Baron
February 18, 1951	April 15, 1951	Oop's better way of life for Moo
April 22, 1951	June 3, 1951	Oop, ghost at large
June 10, 1951	July 15, 1951	Guz and the Moovian jail
July 22, 1951	September 2, 1951	Oop, champion of the people
September 9, 1951	September 30, 1951	Ooola returns to Moo
October 7, 1951	October 21, 1951	Foozy's toothache
October 28, 1951	November 18, 1951	Little Oop learns to hunt
November 25, 1951	December 23, 1951	Foozy's kids go hunting
December 30, 1951	January 20, 1952	Dinny's stolen egg
January 27, 1952	March 2, 1952	Oop, court minstrel
March 9, 1952	June 1, 1952	Dinny catches a cold
June 8, 1952	July 20, 1952	Guz tries to exile Oop
July 27, 1952	September 28, 1952	The flying dinosaurs
October 5, 1952	November 2, 1952	Stock car racing
November 9, 1952	November 30, 1952	Modern policemen in Moo
December 7, 1952	February 15, 1953	Oop loses his memory
February 22, 1953	April 26, 1953	Oop takes the Moovian crown
May 3, 1953	May 24, 1953	Hunting with Foozy's kids
May 31, 1953	July 12, 1953	Oop as Guz's bodyguard
July 19, 1953	August 30, 1953	Oop needs new pants
September 6, 1953	December 6, 1953	Oopland
December 13, 1953	January 10, 1954	Guz and Alley settle their differences
January 17, 1954		Alley's garden
January 24, 1954	February 21, 1954	Ooola and Alley patch things up
February 28, 1954	May 30, 1954	Guz and Alley have a duel
June 6, 1954	June 27, 1954	Foozy's blackmail scheme
July 4, 1954	August 29, 1954	Oop, chief of Moovian police
September 5, 1954	November 28, 1954	Dogs and cats
December 5, 1954	December 26, 1954	Oop strains his brain
January 2, 1955	February 6, 1955	Prince Oop
February 13, 1955	March 6, 1955	Woman troubles
March 13, 1955	June 5, 1955	Oop, assistant Wizer
June 12, 1955	July 3, 1955	Guz drives Oop out of Moo
July 10, 1955	August 14, 1955	Eedy and her father
August 21, 1955	October 9, 1955	X-ray vision
October 16, 1955	October 23, 1955	Pterodactyl riding with Foozy
October 30, 1955	January 15, 1956	The king of Gondwana abducts the Wizer
January 22, 1956	March 25, 1956	It's a woman's world
April 1, 1956	April 22, 1956	Alley brings Guz a dinosaur
April 29, 1956	May 20, 1956	Adventures in babysitting
May 27, 1956	July 15, 1956	Guz sends the army after Alley
July 22, 1956	August 26, 1956	Guz and Umpa go on a diet
September 2, 1956	September 16, 1956	Foozy tries Wizing
September 23, 1956	October 7, 1956	Cross-dressing Moovians
October 14, 1956	November 25, 1956	Alley fixes his axe
December 2, 1956	January 13, 1957	Alley pretends to be sick
January 20, 1957	April 21, 1957	Guz learns to act like royalty
April 28, 1957	June 16, 1957	The ceratosaurus gizzard
June 23, 1957	June 30, 1957	National Black Eye Week
July 7, 1957	August 18, 1957	Guz and Umpa abdicate / A word from our sponsor (The "word from our sponsor" was a meta-fictional story-within-a-story in which the Alley Oop characters lifted the comic panels to look for an annoying spokesman who kept interrupting their storyline.)
August 25, 1957	September 15, 1957	The yowling dinosaur
September 22, 1957	November 3, 1957	Foozy and Alley explore Moo
November 10, 1957	December 29, 1957	Wala, Poddywumps, and Whiskers come to Moo
January 5, 1958	February 9, 1958	Oop, minister of women's affairs
February 16, 1958	May 11, 1958	Oop becomes a Yobnerg ("greenboy" spelled backwards)
May 18, 1958	June 15, 1958	Diving for doubloons
June 22, 1958	October 19, 1958	Big game hunting (This is the next-to-last Sunday time-travel story)
October 26, 1958	December 7, 1958	Guz hurts his foot
December 14, 1958	December 28, 1958	The tailless dinosaur
January 4, 1959	February 15, 1959	Guz's pet mammoth
February 22, 1959	March 29, 1959	It's a man's world
April 5, 1959	April 26, 1959	Guz's vacation
May 3, 1959	June 7, 1959	Oop's hot-air balloon
June 14, 1959	July 19, 1959	Oop returns to Moo
July 26, 1959	August 23, 1959	Firing the Grand Wizer
August 30, 1959	October 4, 1959	Guz's toothache
October 11, 1959	November 22, 1959	Mini-Dinny
November 29, 1959	December 6, 1959	Alley and Foozy sit and think
December 13, 1959	June 26, 1960	Oop, king of Mootoo

==== 1960s ====
Start date	End date	Description
July 3, 1960	July 10, 1960	Guz puts down the revolution
July 17, 1960	August 28, 1960	Alley takes it easy
September 4, 1960	October 23, 1960	Riding the gold train
October 30, 1960	January 1, 1961	Meeting Alley's father (this is the last Sunday time-travel story)
January 8, 1961	February 12, 1961	Tax collections
February 19, 1961	April 2, 1961	Ooola makes Alley jealous
April 9, 1961	May 7, 1961	The underwater mystery monster
May 14, 1961	June 25, 1961	Oop, game warden
July 2, 1961	September 3, 1961	Substitute king Hexa
September 10, 1961	October 8, 1961	The royal family's mental wellness
October 15, 1961	November 19, 1961	Measles outbreak
November 26, 1961	December 24, 1961	He Ro arrives
December 31, 1961	February 25, 1962	Oop the clam magnate (In a light-hearted jibe at the B.C. comic strip, Oop discovers that clams make awful currency because they spoil and stink.)
March 4, 1962	April 1, 1962	Oop's not dead
April 8, 1962	April 29, 1962	Killjoy Oop
May 6, 1962	June 24, 1962	The exalted society of Moovian bird-watchers
July 1, 1962	August 19, 1962	Guz and Wizer trade places (On August 12, the Wizer's name is revealed to be "Pooky")
August 26, 1962	November 11, 1962	Wizer vs Dujoo the witch
November 18, 1962	December 2, 1962	Oop's hammock
December 9, 1962	December 23, 1962	Boredom in Moo
December 30, 1962	March 10, 1963	The Wizer goes away for a while
March 17, 1963	July 7, 1963	Moovian weight-reduction programs
July 14, 1963	August 18, 1963	Modern art in Moo
August 25, 1963	October 13, 1963	Guz's golf game
October 20, 1963	November 24, 1963	Umpa's picture window
January 12, 1963	December 29, 1963	Oop and Foozy go foraging
January 5, 1964	March 29, 1964	Oop denies being smart
April 5, 1964	May 10, 1964	Alley visits Mogo
May 17, 1964	August 9, 1964	The Mogoite invasion
August 16, 1964	September 20, 1964	Golf with a moron
September 27, 1964	November 1, 1964	The gazookus gizzard
November 8, 1964	January 31, 1965	Guz pretends to be dead
February 7, 1965	May 16, 1965	The Wizer is fired and re-hired
May 23, 1965	August 1, 1965	Alley and Foozy go hunting
August 8, 1965	August 22, 1965	Alley and Foozy's musical jam
August 29, 1965	September 26, 1965	The Wizer calms Oop
October 3, 1965	November 21, 1965	Moovian tiddlywinks
November 28, 1965	December 5, 1965	The fairy circle
December 12, 1965	January 9, 1966	Black-eyed romance
January 16, 1966	February 13, 1966	The dinosaur mating song
February 20, 1966	March 6, 1966	Wizer psyches out Oop
March 13, 1966	April 24, 1966	The dinosaur pox
May 1, 1966	July 10, 1966	Guz's nephew takes over
July 17, 1966	August 21, 1966	Umpa takes the throne
August 28, 1966	November 27, 1966	Guz gets a new spotted cat skin
December 4, 1966	December 25, 1966	Alley and Foozy go fishing
January 1, 1967	January 22, 1967	The Wizer's a trapper
January 29, 1967	March 5, 1967	Oop's new dinosaur Gizzy
March 12, 1967	April 2, 1967	Alley uses big words
April 9, 1967	May 28, 1967	Alley's evil eye
June 4, 1967	September 10, 1967	Umpa leaves Guz
September 17, 1967	September 24, 1967	gag strips
October 1, 1967	December 10, 1967	Alley's new pet dinosaur
December 17, 1967	February 4, 1968	Dinny's new family
February 11, 1968	March 10, 1968	Oop is presumed dead
March 17, 1968	May 12, 1968	Oop isn't feeling well
May 19, 1968	July 28, 1968	Foozy the Grand Wizer
August 4, 1968	October 13, 1968	Guz goes on a diet
October 20, 1968	October 27, 1968	The ladies get dinner
November 3, 1968	December 8, 1968	Alley babysits Foozy's kids
December 15, 1968	January 19, 1969	Guz and the Wizer search for reasons to arrest Alley
January 26, 1969	March 2, 1969	The rigor of being king
March 9, 1969	April 13, 1969	Alley's gone soft
April 20, 1969	May 11, 1969	Arms race of war clubs
May 18, 1969		Alley's hunt comes up zero
May 25, 1969	June 29, 1969	Alley vs the Cardiff Giant
July 6, 1969	July 27, 1969	Oop's revolution
August 3, 1969	August 31, 1969	Oop's day of exile
September 7, 1969	November 16, 1969	Oop's new dinosaur Pooky
November 23, 1969	December 21, 1969	Alley and Ooola's day out
December 28, 1969	February 8, 1970	Oop flirts with the womenfolk

==== 1970s ====
Start date	End date	Description
February 15, 1970	March 29, 1970	Oop, chief of police
April 5, 1970	April 26, 1970	Alley has dinosaur troubles
May 3, 1970	May 10, 1970	Oop and Ooola squabble
May 17, 1970	May 24, 1970	Alley gets a check-up
May 31, 1970	June 7, 1970	Alley sings
June 14, 1970	August 30, 1970	Oop and Guz's golf tournament
September 6, 1970	December 13, 1970	Oop, king of Moo
December 20, 1970	January 31, 1971	Peacenik children take the throne
February 7, 1971	May 30, 1971	The mystery of the missing queens
June 6, 1971	September 26, 1971	Princess Ceelee of Gonwanaland
October 3, 1971	November 7, 1971	Oop's spoiling for a fight
November 14, 1971	December 26, 1971	Spooky shenanigans
January 2, 1972	January 9, 1972	Dinosaur fishing
January 16, 1972	September 10, 1972	Baffo tries for the throne
September 17, 1972	December 17, 1972	The Ohnolun invasion
December 24, 1972	February 4, 1973	Guz is aphasic
February 11, 1973	May 27, 1973	Baffo takes the throne
June 3, 1973	July 22, 1973	Oop's hex picture
July 29, 1973	November 11, 1973	Messages of cheer and joy
November 18, 1973	February 17, 1974	Troll troubles
February 24, 1974	June 9, 1974	Guz goes on a diet
June 16, 1974	August 11, 1974	Guz returns to Moo
August 18, 1974	October 27, 1974	Guz and Umpa's marital strife
November 3, 1974	December 1, 1974	Alley rescues a baby pterodactyl
December 8, 1974	December 22, 1974	Guz' new club
December 29, 1974	March 9, 1975	The big-tooth fella
March 16, 1975	May 11, 1975	Guz's necklace
May 18, 1975	June 15, 1975	Loony the trader
June 22, 1975	August 24, 1975	Guz's sailboat
August 31, 1975	October 5, 1975	Guz has amnesia
October 12, 1975	November 2, 1975	Guz recuperates
November 9, 1975	December 28, 1975	Alley's new dinosaur Filmore
January 4, 1976	March 28, 1976	Swamp apples
April 4, 1976	May 9, 1976	Three-legged journey home (May 2 strip adapted in Alley Oop Adventures #2, 1998)
May 16, 1976	August 22, 1976	Teeny and Boke
August 29, 1976	October 3, 1976	Littlebeak and Longbeard (reprinted, starting with September 5, in Alley Oop Adventures #1, 1999)
October 10, 1976	November 14, 1976	The great Moovian pipeline (reprinted in Alley Oop Adventures #1, 1999)
November 21, 1976	January 9, 1977	Boomerang rocks (adapted in Alley Oop Adventures #2, 1998)
January 16, 1977	February 27, 1977	Kidnapped by the Boony-Goonies
March 6, 1977	July 10, 1977	The Outlander invasion
July 17, 1977	November 13, 1977	Alley becomes Grand Wizer
November 20, 1977	February 12, 1978	Salads and stunflowers
February 19, 1978	July 30, 1978	The alien shrink ray
August 6, 1978	October 22, 1978	Rollerboning
October 29, 1978	January 14, 1979	Curleyville
January 21, 1979	February 18, 1979	Pterodactyl riding
February 25, 1979	July 15, 1979	Prisoner of Outland
July 22, 1979	December 16, 1979	Princess Krakatoa and Ferdy

==== 1980s ====
Start date	End date	Description
December 23, 1979	March 30, 1980	Guz's new dinosaur Cuddles
April 6, 1980	June 15, 1980	Mag and Gummo adopt Alley
June 22, 1980	September 21, 1980	Cuddles and her baby
September 28, 1980	October 26, 1980	Big boo and little boo
November 2, 1980	December 7, 1980	Guz and Umpa's new house
December 14, 1980	February 8, 1981	Alley's treehouse
February 15, 1981	March 22, 1981	Ferdy's family
March 29, 1981	April 19, 1981	Oop's new dinosaur Tagalong
April 26, 1981	June 7, 1981	The thieving magpie
June 14, 1981	November 4, 1981	The trial of Snag and Eegore
November 11, 1981	December 20, 1981	The green blob from outer space
December 27, 1981	February 7, 1982	Bongo the swindler
February 14, 1982	March 7, 1982	Guz loses his voice
March 14, 1982	June 20, 1982	Escape from Emu the giant
June 27, 1982	August 15, 1982	Rescue from the Hairy Ones
August 22, 1982	October 17, 1982	Hojo, President of Moo
October 24, 1982	December 12, 1982	Umpa's cousin Effy
December 19, 1982	February 6, 1983	Gifts for Effy and Ooola
February 13, 1983	February 27, 1983	Cleaning up the town
March 6, 1983	April 17, 1983	Umpa's night to remember
April 24, 1983	May 29, 1983	The giant hoo-hoo bird
June 5, 1983	July 3, 1983	Dinny's new romance
July 10, 1983	September 25, 1983	Mango and his buddies
October 2, 1983	December 25, 1983	The bad-luck gemstone
January 1, 1984	March 11, 1984	Handyman Teddy
March 18, 1984	June 17, 1984	Ondamah vs the Yorkles
June 24, 1984	August 19, 1984	Princess Blivette goes on a diet
August 26, 1984	December 2, 1984	The land of giants
December 9, 1984	December 30, 1984	Alley's launcher ruins the picnic
January 6, 1985	April 7, 1985	Loo Loo's daycare center
April 14, 1985	May 26, 1985	The Wizer's youth potion
June 2, 1985	September 8, 1985	Tildy the sorceress
September 15, 1985	November 3, 1985	Carla and her parents
November 10, 1985	February 16, 1986	Mini-Dinny vs Guz
February 23, 1986	June 1, 1986	Mighty Alley and the firegod
June 8, 1986	June 15, 1986	Cheering up Umpa and Ooola
June 22, 1986	October 5, 1986	The diatrymas
October 12, 1986	November 9, 1986	Alley stuck in a hole
November 16, 1986	January 11, 1987	Moovian acrobatics
January 18, 1987	June 28, 1987	Little Leta and Feelipe
July 5, 1987	August 15, 1987	Hunting with Farky
August 23, 1987		golf gag
August 30, 1987	September 13, 1987	The old folks' cave
September 20, 1987	November 8, 1987	Oop's headcoverings
November 15, 1987	December 20, 1987	Fishing with Fabulous Feeny
December 27, 1987	February 7, 1988	Cooking with Ferdy
February 7, 1988	March 13, 1988	Dino troubles
March 20, 1988	May 8, 1988	Prisoners of the Little Big Feet
May 15, 1988	July 3, 1988	Alley has spot rot
July 10, 1988	July 17, 1988	Alley's artwork
July 24, 1988		Cocoball
July 31, 1988	August 28, 1988	Guz's Great Ant
September 4, 1988	September 25, 1988	the Wizer's dinosaur attractor
October 2, 1988	October 9, 1988	The faux fountain of youth
October 16, 1988	October 23, 1988	Hunting and fishing
October 30, 1988	November 20, 1988	Gazooley the rainmaker
November 27, 1988	January 8, 1989	Oop the giant
January 15, 1989	March 5, 1989	Won Ton the trader
March 12, 1989		Sunday-advertising gag
March 19, 1989	April 16, 1989	Oop's dinosaur whistle
April 23, 1989	May 7, 1989	Guz's dinner
May 14, 1989	June 4, 1989	Oop's hairy tongue
June 11, 1989	July 9, 1989	Ferdy and the frog
July 16, 1989	August 20, 1989	Ailments and medicine
August 27, 1989	October 8, 1989	Oop's lucky stone
October 15, 1989	November 26, 1989	Dubby's bait cakes
December 3, 1989	January 28, 1990	Oop's cave mural

==== 1990s ====
Start date	End date	Description
February 4, 1990	March 25, 1990	Guz seeks enlightenment
April 1, 1990	April 22, 1990	Guz as Grand Wizer
April 29, 1990	June 10, 1990	The ghost of good government
June 17, 1990	July 15, 1990	The rockpile map scam
July 22, 1990	August 12, 1990	Bird calling
August 19, 1990	September 2, 1990	Moovian fitness center
September 9, 1990	December 2, 1990	Big Mama and the mini-Oops
December 9, 1990	March 31, 1991	Garzak the changeling (February 10 strip adapted in Alley Oop Adventures #3, 1998)
April 7, 1991	May 5, 1991	Alley clowns around
May 12, 1991	June 9, 1991	Guz and Oop go fishing
June 16, 1991	July 14, 1991	Bug-stomping business
July 21, 1991	September 1, 1991	Alley Oop's lending bank
September 8, 1991	October 27, 1991	Oop's jailbreak
November 3, 1991	January 12, 1992	Alley meets High Note (November 3 strip adapted in Alley Oop Adventures #3, 2000)
January 19, 1992	February 2, 1992	Replacing Big Ida's pet
February 9, 1992	February 23, 1992	Headstands and dizzy spins
March 1, 1992	April 19, 1992	Guz's surprises for Umpa
April 26, 1992	June 28, 1992	The abdominal snowman
July 12, 1992	September 6, 1992	Alley's Uncle Axel
September 13, 1992	November 15, 1992	The land of women
November 22, 1992	January 3, 1993	Cave gnomes
January 10, 1993	March 28, 1993	Guz and Alley get dinofoot (January 17 strip, minus one panel, reprinted in Alley Oop Adventures #1, 1999)
April 4, 1993	April 18, 1993	The Wizer's father and girlfriend
April 25, 1993	July 25, 1993	Digger the mind-reading bird (adapted in Alley Oop Adventures #1, 1998)
August 1, 1993	August 29, 1993	Moovian bowling (August 8 strip adapted in Alley Oop Adventures #1, 1998)
September 12, 1993	October 17, 1993	Dinner with Alley and Guz
October 24, 1993	November 7, 1993	The stupid game of golfing
November 14, 1993	November 28, 1993	Umpa burns the dinner
December 5, 1993	December 12, 1993	Oop babysits
December 19, 1993	January 16, 1994	Dolf makes a play for Ooola (reprinted in Alley Oop Adventures #3, 2000)
January 23, 1994	February 13, 1994	Oop and Ooola's dinner pranks
February 20, 1994	March 27, 1994	Dinosaur woes
April 3, 1994	May 8, 1994	Trading with the Meggets
May 15, 1994	September 18, 1994	Murdle's restaurant
September 25, 1994	October 30, 1994	Pterodactyl flying with Foozy
November 6, 1994	January 15, 1995	The land of Guzzes
January 22, 1995	February 19, 1995	Paragliding home
February 26, 1995	March 12, 1995	Soonie and Sweet Toes
March 19, 1995	March 26, 1995	The laughing dinosaurs
April 2, 1995	May 14, 1995	No drought in Moo
May 21, 1995	June 4, 1995	Food fight
June 11, 1995	January 28, 1996	Alley the Grand Wizer
February 4, 1996	February 11, 1996	Alley babysits Foozy's kids
February 18, 1996	April 7, 1996	Umpa's fish pool
April 14, 1996	April 21, 1996	Making up with Ooola
April 28, 1996	May 12, 1996	Umpa's portrait
May 19, 1996	July 28, 1996	Ol's spaceship
August 4, 1996	September 15, 1996	Alley goes on a diet
September 22, 1996	October 27, 1996	Oop, temporary king
November 3, 1996	December 22, 1996	Umpa and Guz meet Tanu and Coral
December 29, 1996	April 27, 1997	Alley's new friend Ralfy
May 4, 1997	June 1, 1997	Kahlee and the mud men
June 8, 1997	November 16, 1997	Foozy's magic staff
November 23, 1997	February 1, 1998	Mini-dino hunt
February 8, 1998	March 22, 1998	Mating season with Sugar Lips
March 29, 1998		bird divebombers (reprinted, minus one panel, in Alley Oop Adventures #3, 1998)
April 5, 1998	June 7, 1998	Umpa's art contest
June 15, 1998		Oop's lazy day
June 21, 1998	August 16, 1998	Earthquake
August 23, 1998	September 20, 1998	Alley gets amnesia
September 27, 1998	November 22, 1998	New fashions in Moo
November 29, 1998	January 17, 1999	Grug and Chongo kidnap Ooola
January 24, 1999	January 31, 1999	Oop and Ooola's failed picnic
February 7, 1999	February 21, 1999	Oop falls into a pterodactyl nest (February 14 and 21 retell November 24 and December 1, 1974)
February 28, 1999	March 14, 1999	The dancing dinosaurs' hat party
March 21, 1999	April 4, 1999	The Wizer fixes Alley up
April 11, 1999	June 6, 1999	Wazoo's cart
June 13, 1999	August 15, 1999	Guz's new dinosaur Rocky
August 22, 1999	October 17, 1999	Guz and Alley, the blue brothers (August 22 strip reprinted in Alley Oop Adventures #2, 1999)
October 24, 1999		Oop and Ooola's uneventful day
October 31, 1999	January 2, 2000	Guz's memorial portrait

==== 2000s ====
Start date	End date	Description
January 9, 2000	March 5, 2000	Guz invents shoes
March 12, 2000	March 19, 2000	Alley and Guz don't go fishing
March 26, 2000	April 30, 2000	The laughing drooptails
May 7, 2000	June 4, 2000	Guz and Umpa's drum dinner
June 11, 2000	July 9, 2000	Oop communes with nature
July 16, 2000	August 13, 2000	Babysitting and dino rides
August 20, 2000	September 17, 2000	Alley's land sailer
September 24, 2000	October 29, 2000	Clagget the Magnificent
November 5, 2000	December 17, 2000	Guz and Umpa's short vacation
December 24, 2000	December 31, 2000	Alley and Guz go fishing
January 7, 2001	January 28, 2001	The fish-head prank
February 4, 2001	March 4, 2001	Charity distribution
March 11, 2001	March 18, 2001	Oop hurts his foot
March 25, 2001		Stew Invaders: Alley Oop does Douglas Adams
April 1, 2001	April 8, 2001	The April Fool's party
April 15, 2001	May 13, 2001	Alley and Guz play golf
May 20, 2001	July 8, 2001	Guys against the gals race
July 15, 2001	August 26, 2001	Brutus the attack dinosaur
September 2, 2001	September 9, 2001	Dinny lives the good life (Carole and Jack Bender take over from Dave Graue starting with this story)
September 16, 2001	October 28, 2001	Medicine for little Danno (adapted from Alley Oop Adventures #2, 1999)
November 4, 2001	December 9, 2001	Oop gets Foozy's rhyming curse
December 16, 2001	December 23, 2001	Wootietoot's home for Christmas
December 30, 2001		Competing New Year's parties
January 6, 2002	January 20, 2002	How to find food in the jungle (reprinted from Alley Oop Adventures #1, 1999)
January 27, 2002		Mount Umpa (adapted from Alley Oop Adventures #2, 1999)
February 3, 2002		Alley's cave painting (Jack Bender tryout strip, also published in Alley Oop Adventures #1, 1999)
February 10, 2002	February 24, 2002	Oop's noisy neighbors
March 3, 2002	March 31, 2002	March Madness basketball
April 7, 2002		gag strip (red dino)
April 14, 2002	May 26, 2002	Roblio and Joliette
June 2, 2002	June 23, 2002	Guz and Oop's flying wings
June 30, 2002		gag strip (rain)
July 7, 2002	August 4, 2002	Summer vacation cruise
August 11, 2002		gag strip (dumb animals)
August 18, 2002	September 1, 2002	Lila meets Rocko
September 8, 2002	September 22, 2002	Dinny and the dinky dino (adapted from Alley Oop Adventures #3, 1998)
September 29, 2002	October 6, 2002	Oop gets a cold
October 13, 2002	November 3, 2002	Wizer's evil twin Wizzer
November 10, 2002	November 24, 2002	School-days memories
December 1, 2002	December 29, 2002	Earlie Oop arrives
January 5, 2003	January 19, 2003	gag strips
January 26, 2003	February 23, 2003	Oop's cart race
March 2, 2003	April 6, 2003	Foozy's alone time
April 13, 2003	May 11, 2003	Men and women swap jobs
May 18, 2003	July 13, 2003	Guz invents baseball
July 20, 2003	August 17, 2003	gag strips
August 24, 2003	September 14, 2003	Guz tries to get a new dino (August 24 and 31 redraw January 27, 1980, and February 3, 1980; September 7 retells January 13, 1980)
September 21, 2003	October 19, 2003	Oop's lucky clover
October 26, 2003	November 2, 2003	Umpa's spa concept
November 9, 2003	November 23, 2003	Thanksgiving with Moo and Lem
November 30, 2003	December 21, 2003	Moo's new orphans
December 28, 2003	January 18, 2004	Framevision
January 25, 2004	February 15, 2004	Guz and Alley's fish alarm
February 22, 2004	March 21, 2004	The Moovian reservoir (this story reprints the daily strips from August 22 to 26, 1995, with new panels added)
March 28, 2004	April 25, 2004	The circus comes to Moo
May 2, 2004	May 16, 2004	The mysterious monolith
May 23, 2004	June 6, 2004	Alley's dinosaur whistle
June 13, 2004	July 25, 2004	King Oop
August 1, 2004	August 22, 2004	Alley and Guz go fishing
August 29, 2004	October 10, 2004	The Wizer's chickenosaurus soup
October 17, 2004	November 7, 2004	Stew Invaders extended edition (October 17 strip reprints the second half of the March 25, 2001, strip)
November 14, 2004	December 26, 2004	Guz gets Scrooged
January 2, 2005		Happy New Year
January 9, 2005	February 27, 2005	Foozy as Guz's bodyguard
March 6, 2005		gag strip
March 13, 2005	April 3, 2005	Wizer's emergency clinic
April 10, 2005		gag strip
April 17, 2005	May 8, 2005	Dinny's solo outing
May 15, 2005		retells Oop and Ooola's uneventful day from October 24, 1999
May 22, 2005	June 12, 2005	retells Dubby's bait cakes (from October 15 to November 26, 1989)
June 19, 2005	July 17, 2005	The giant-feather bird
July 24, 2005	September 4, 2005	Mountain, strongest man in Moo (this sequence starts by reprinting daily strips from July 19 – September 2, 2005, but then ends the story on September 4 with new art while the daily story continues separately)
September 11, 2005		gag strip
September 18, 2005	October 9, 2005	Pterodactyls make bad pets
October 16, 2005		Happy autumn
October 23, 2005	November 13, 2005	Ooperman
November 20, 2005		Happy Thanksgiving
November 27, 2005		gag strip
December 4, 2005	December 25, 2005	One of our reindeer is missing

== Daily storylines ==
The following is a list of storylines featured in the daily comic strips. Actual story titles were not provided in the strips; the dates and story descriptions given here are, therefore, not official or definitive delineations but may serve as a rough index to the history of the strip.

Although the Bonnet–Brown strips appeared in daily comics sections, their distribution was erratic, so that the strips' handwritten dates did not always match their actual publication dates. Consequently, after February 6, 1933, the strips were not dated but were instead given a sequential number (from 55 through 120), presumably so that editors could run them whenever they were received. The dates given here may, therefore, not be precisely accurate for every newspaper in which the strip appeared.

=== Bonnet–Brown ===
Start date	End date	Description
December 6, 1932	December 12, 1932	Oop gets breakfast
December 13, 1932	January 14, 1933	Oop befriends Dinny
January 16, 1933	February 17, 1933	Introducing Dinny to the Moovians
February 19, 1933	April 29, 1933	Rescuing Ooola from the Cardiff Giant
May 1, 1933	May 6, 1933	A hero's welcome

=== Newspaper Enterprise Association ===
==== 1930s ====
Start date	End date	Description
August 7, 1933	September 2, 1933	Oop befriends Dinny
September 4, 1933	September 28, 1933	Introducing Dinny to the Moovians
September 29, 1933	October 21, 1933	Rescuing Ooola from the Cardiff Giant
October 23, 1933	November 4, 1933	A hero's welcome
November 6, 1933	November 17, 1933	Oop vs Cardiff Giant, round two
November 18, 1933	January 11, 1934	Umpa wants a baby dino
January 12, 1934	January 27, 1934	Foozy pretends to be Umpa's pet
January 29, 1934	March 12, 1934	Oop's rebellion
March 13, 1934	March 24, 1934	Tunk steals Dinny
March 26, 1934	April 27, 1934	Guz and Alley settle their differences
April 28, 1934	May 19, 1934	Oop is promised to Wootietoot
May 21, 1934	June 23, 1934	Rescuing Dinny from Lem
June 25, 1934	July 23, 1934	Alley and Ooola can't stop the wedding
July 24, 1934	August 1, 1934	Dinny is treed
August 2, 1934	September 3, 1934	Alley and Foozy are swept away
September 4, 1934	September 18, 1934	Alley and Foozy thrash Dootsy's gang
September 19, 1934	October 30, 1934	Wedding preparations
October 31, 1934	December 8, 1934	Dootsy kidnaps Ooola and Wootietoot
December 10, 1934	December 29, 1934	Lem conquers Moo
December 31, 1934	April 13, 1935	Moo drives out the invaders
April 15, 1935	May 6, 1935	Oop nominated for king
May 7, 1935	June 6, 1935	Oop and Guz prepare to duel but disappear underground
June 7, 1935	June 22, 1935	Foozy takes over Moo
June 24, 1935	August 6, 1935	Guz and Alley escape to the surface
August 7, 1935	September 20, 1935	Dootsy Bobo re-ignites the war
September 21, 1935	October 22, 1935	Ooola and Dinny help Alley get home
October 23, 1935	December 12, 1935	Moo vs Lem: final round
December 13, 1935	December 31, 1935	Guz's pterodactyl flight
January 1, 1936	January 17, 1936	Foozy comes home
January 18, 1936	April 10, 1936	Foozy vs the Grand Wizer
April 11, 1936	May 15, 1936	Oop vs the Grand Wizer
May 16, 1936	July 25, 1936	Oop and Ooola visit Sawalla
July 27, 1936	August 28, 1936	King Wur makes trouble
August 29, 1936	October 24, 1936	Return to Sawalla
October 26, 1936	January 22, 1937	Wur conquers Moo and Lem
January 23, 1937	February 25, 1937	Wur is deposed
February 26, 1937	March 9, 1937	Wur escapes
March 10, 1937	March 22, 1937	The hunters lose Foozy
March 23, 1937	April 3, 1937	Oop is jailed
April 5, 1937	May 4, 1937	Foozy and Oop join the Bighorn tribe
May 5, 1937	May 27, 1937	Dinny's new overcoat
May 28, 1937	June 19, 1937	The journey back to Moo
June 21, 1937	July 12, 1937	The mammoth hides and the Wizer
July 13, 1937	August 24, 1937	Foozy romances Ooola
August 25, 1937	November 19, 1937	The Grand Wizer conspires with Foozy
November 20, 1937	December 24, 1937	Umpa takes over
December 25, 1937	January 27, 1938	Eeny arrives in Moo
January 28, 1937	April 13, 1938	Dictator Eeny
April 14, 1938	April 29, 1938	Moo is flooded
April 30, 1938	June 25, 1938	Mootoo
June 27, 1938	July 11, 1938	Ooola and the Wizer return
July 12, 1938	August 3, 1938	Foozy, chief of police
August 4, 1938	September 1, 1938	Dinny is sick
September 2, 1938	September 23, 1938	Foozy meets Zel
September 24, 1938	November 4, 1938	Training Kakky
November 5, 1938	November 12, 1938	Foozy's new cave
November 14, 1938	January 18, 1939	Ooola's would-be suitors
January 19, 1939	March 4, 1939	Foozy's courtship and marriage
March 6, 1939	April 5, 1939	Guz eats Dinny's egg
April 6, 1939	July 21, 1939	Oop is the Phantom Ape
July 22, 1939	October 26, 1939	The Trojan War
October 27, 1939	February 24, 1940	The Odyssey

==== 1940s ====
Start date	End date	Description
February 26, 1940	July 29, 1940	Hercules and the Amazons
July 31, 1940	November 19, 1940	Cleopatra and the crocodile priests
November 20, 1939	April 2, 1940	Oscar Boom vs Cleopatra
April 3, 1941	September 6, 1941	Boom is Blackbeard the pirate
September 8, 1941	September 13, 1941	The Story So Far
September 15, 1941	November 21, 1941	Foozy in the 20th century (Jon quits the lab on October 16)
November 22, 1941	April 2, 1942	the Magna Carta
April 3, 1942	April 18, 1942	Dinny in the 20th Century
April 20, 1942	May 8, 1942	Oop tries to enlist (strip is reduced in size on April 20)
May 9, 1942	August 18, 1942	Fighting the Japanese with Boom
August 19, 1942	September 14, 1942	Dinny at the zoo
September 15, 1942	January 16, 1943	Dictator Eeny returns
January 18, 1943	January 26, 1943	Umpa tries 20th-century fashion
January 27, 1943	March 3, 1943	Shenanigans with Foozy's kids
March 4, 1943	March 25, 1943	The rubber vines
March 26, 1943	April 26, 1943	Oop wants a steak
April 27, 1943	August 26, 1943	Boom and Oop meet Archimedes
August 27, 1943	September 23, 1943	By rocket to China
September 24, 1943	December 31, 1943	Genghis Khan's sword
January 1, 1944	February 24, 1944	Gorilla warfare in Moo
February 25, 1944	April 6, 1944	Dinny is sick
April 7, 1944	April 15, 1944	Guz gets the magic belt
April 17, 1944	August 3, 1944	King Solomon's mines
August 4, 1944	November 24, 1944	The caveman rescue squad comes for Alley
November 25, 1944	February 14, 1945	Guz's replacement jewels
February 15, 1945	April 2, 1945	Oop, king of Lem
April 3, 1945	May 8, 1945	The time machine's new viewscreen (it first appears on April 3)
May 9, 1945	May 30, 1945	Wonmug meets the Grand Wizer
May 31, 1945	June 22, 1945	Oop gets shocked
June 23, 1945	September 17, 1945	From ancient China to Japan
September 18, 1945	October 26, 1945	Beach vacation (Alley gets a shave October 12)
October 27, 1945	January 23, 1946	Alley Oop as the pirate Davy Jones
January 24, 1946	March 8, 1946	Oop gets his whiskers back
March 9, 1946	March 29, 1946	Bud and Sixty join the lab
March 30, 1946	June 2, 1946	Ancient Lost Atlantis (This story integrated the daily strips with the Sundays from March 31 to June 2)
June 3, 1946	July 19, 1946	Oop vs the crooked carnies
July 20, 1946	October 15, 1946	Attack of the Cro-Mags
October 16, 1946	December 2, 1946	Assistant king
December 3, 1946	January 18, 1947	Gory Gulch gold
January 20, 1947	April 8, 1947	Nitro for Napoleon
April 9, 1947	May 3, 1947	Pirate waters
May 5, 1947	June 20, 1947	The Bashaw's pleasure
June 21, 1947	September 1, 1947	Robinson Crusoe
September 2, 1947	January 15, 1948	Public Enemy Number One
January 16, 1948	March 26, 1948	The fourth dimension
June 5, 1948	July 8, 1948	The Mighty Hu
July 9, 1948	August 30, 1948	Mystery of the Sphinx
August 31, 1948	November 25, 1948	Prince Pokababa woos Ooola
November 26, 1948	January 11, 1949	War between Moo and Lem
January 12, 1949	February 17, 1949	Oop woos Princess Zee
February 18, 1949	May 2, 1949	Pretenders to the thrones
May 3, 1949	July 5, 1949	Fishing with international gangsters (Sunday strips are integrated with the dailies starting May 8)
July 6, 1949	September 23, 1949	First trip to the moon
September 24, 1949	November 9, 1949	The Grand Wizer's cure
November 10, 1949	December 19, 1949	Oop's lecture tour
December 20, 1949	February 13, 1950	In the Land of the Amazons

==== 1950s ====
Start date	End date	Description
February 14, 1950	March 27, 1950	Oscar in Moo
March 28, 1950	May 8, 1950	Tiger hunt
May 9, 1950	June 30, 1950	The Grand Wizer's beads
July 1, 1950	August 23, 1950	With Caesar in Britain
August 24, 1950	October 31, 1950	Richard the Lion-Hearted (last integrated Sunday is October 29)
November 1, 1950	March 19, 1951	Voyage to Venus
March 20, 1951	May 12, 1951	The Great Train Robbery
May 14, 1951	July 27, 1951	Alley's new glasses
July 28, 1951	December 10, 1951	Foozy, emperor of Rome
December 11, 1951	December 25, 1951	Santa Claus takes Alley and Ooola home
December 26, 1951	January 21, 1952	Dinny in the 20th Century
January 22, 1952	March 15, 1952	John Smith and Pocahontas
March 17, 1952	June 21, 1952	Miner '49ers and Marryin' Marion
June 23, 1952	July 23, 1952	The Queen of Sheba
July 24, 1952	September 24, 1952	The genie's magic turban
September 26, 1952	November 1, 1952	Halloweenland
November 3, 1952	December 23, 1952	Degga Degga the witch
December 24, 1952	February 25, 1953	Wonmug in ancient Crete
February 26, 1953	March 10, 1953	Returning dinosaurs to Moo
March 11, 1953	March 28, 1953	The Wizer curses Oop
March 30, 1953	June 1, 1953	Macbeth
June 2, 1953	June 15, 1953	Alley tries to quit smoking
June 16, 1953	August 15, 1953	The Great Spirit of the Bubbling Mud
August 17, 1953	October 24, 1953	Baxter Blair in Moo
October 26, 1953	October 31, 1953	Degga Degga returns
November 2, 1953	March 11, 1954	The Battle of Hastings
March 12, 1954	April 28, 1954	The land of Foozys
April 29, 1954	May 22, 1954	Eustace vs Dinny
May 24, 1954	August 10, 1954	The dragon of Iron Castle
August 11, 1954	November 6, 1954	Wooing Brunnhilde
November 8, 1954	December 30, 1954	Liberating Moo
December 31, 1954	February 14, 1955	Boom's black-light projector
February 15, 1955	March 11, 1955	Rescuing Wonmug from the Picts
March 12, 1955	April 10, 1955	Moovian fishing trip
April 11, 1955	June 20, 1955	Guz's tiger tail
June 21, 1955	July 23, 1955	Ooola meets Helen of Troy
July 25, 1955	October 14, 1955	The tailless tiger and Wabba
October 15, 1955	November 28, 1955	C.O. Lossal and Alexander the Great
November 29, 1955	December 17, 1955	Alley complains to V.T. Hamlin
December 19, 1955	February 25, 1956	Doctor Miller's Miracle Misery Medicine Show
February 27, 1956	April 11, 1956	Blarney Goldfield racing (Oop meets young Wonmug)
April 12, 1956	May 16, 1956	Doctor Ennis wants a dinosaur
May 17, 1956	July 14, 1956	Amnesiac Oop and the old princess
July 16, 1956	August 29, 1956	Wonmug's buffalo ranch
August 30, 1956	September 14, 1956	Kicking the apes out of Moo
September 15, 1956	October 12, 1956	Dinny's offspring
October 13, 1956	November 12, 1956	The Mizoolian spook
November 13, 1956	December 1, 1956	Real-life melodrama
December 3, 1956	December 21, 1956	Abdul Abool Bool Emeer vs Ivan Skivinski Skivaar
December 22, 1956	January 24, 1957	Smith's giant bone
January 25, 1957	February 12, 1957	Alley recuperates
February 13, 1957	April 27, 1957	Alley's riverboat
April 29, 1957	July 18, 1957	The Wizer's hypnosis scheme
July 19, 1957	August 27, 1957	Ooola's gold mine
August 28, 1957	October 26, 1957	Selling Olympus
October 28, 1957	December 9, 1957	Whitey vs the Picts
December 10, 1957	February 3, 1958	Second trip to the moon
February 4, 1958	February 18, 1958	Jack and Ooola head to Natchez
February 19, 1958	March 21, 1958	Wonmug finds the astronauts
March 22, 1958	May 22, 1958	Jack and Alley vie for Ooola
May 23, 1958	June 13, 1958	The alien island colony
June 14, 1958	July 14, 1958	Moovian reunions
July 15, 1958	July 26, 1958	Tiger kitten
July 28, 1958	August 5, 1958	Freeloading from Foozy
August 6, 1958	August 22, 1958	Ta Boo and the new immigrants
August 23, 1958	October 18, 1958	The Wizer's rockslide mystery
October 20, 1958	November 10, 1958	The pterodactyl riders of Bul
November 12, 1958	March 7, 1959	Oxy Twenty-Four, the moonman
March 9, 1959	April 23, 1959	Guz is rescued from Bul
April 24, 1959	August 10, 1959	Mabacak and the million-dollar nugget
August 11, 1959	October 1, 1959	Oxy's mechanical man
October 2, 1959	December 24, 1959	Oxy and the Lemian occupation of Moo
December 25, 1959	January 29, 1960	Oxy's anti-gravity machine

==== 1960s ====
Start date	End date	Description
January 30, 1960	March 4, 1960	Catching up with Dinny's grandson
March 5, 1960	April 20, 1960	The fountain of youth
April 21, 1960	May 12, 1960	Oxy's trip to the moon
May 13, 1960	July 15, 1960	Young Doc and Brunnehilde
July 16, 1960	September 23, 1960	Dee Daily, reporter
September 24, 1960	November 3, 1960	The million-dollar nugget, round two
November 4, 1960	December 5, 1960	Diplodocus on the loose
December 6, 1960	January 14, 1961	Wonmug meets his ancestors
January 16, 1961	February 14, 1961	Retrieving Ooola from the Old West
February 15, 1961	March 31, 1961	Oop's commandos
April 1, 1961	April 14, 1961	Alley's odd jobs
April 15, 1961	May 5, 1961	Oxy's pirate adventure
May 6, 1961	August 29, 1961	Invasion of the moonmen
August 30, 1961	December 7, 1961	Professor Oop
December 8, 1961	January 18, 1962	Oop's new dinosaur Jefferson
January 19, 1962	February 26, 1962	Alley babysits Foozy's kids
February 27, 1962	April 7, 1962	Gold in Alder Gulch
April 9, 1962	August 17, 1962	Oop's brain transplant
August 18, 1962	October 20, 1962	Progress and coffee in Moo
October 22, 1962	November 19, 1962	Oop takes the throne
November 20, 1962	December 18, 1962	Stripes the tiger
December 19, 1962	February 19, 1962	The princess and the dragon
February 20, 1962	March 13, 1963	X-ray vision
March 14, 1963	June 29, 1963	Big Charley and Little Charley
July 1, 1963	August 6, 1963	Wonmug recruits Yakkahik
August 7, 1963	August 28, 1963	King Willie on the radio
August 29, 1963	November 7, 1963	King Yakkahik (Alley gets glasses again on September 5)
November 8, 1963	February 1, 1964	Gikky the Lemian
February 3, 1964	May 11, 1964	Nick Smith and the Olympians
May 12, 1964	June 19, 1964	Alley the weather god
June 20, 1964	July 18, 1964	Amnesiac Oop takes the Moovian crown
July 20, 1964	August 31, 1964	Cleopatra's dye job
September 1, 1964	October 3, 1964	The mini-mummy
October 5, 1964	November 30, 1964	Oscar and Doc visit Brunnehilde
December 1, 1964	January 30, 1965	Koozuh and her family
February 1, 1965	April 13, 1965	Robot IO2
April 14, 1965	May 25, 1965	Alley's hammock
May 26, 1965	August 20, 1965	Mariner 4 and the Martian picnic
August 21, 1965	September 28, 1965	Preparing for the ice age
September 29, 1965	November 22, 1965	Doctor Nottagotta's brain serum
November 23, 1965	December 18, 1965	Ooola on the throne
December 20, 1965	January 22, 1965	Time-traveler from 2166
January 24, 1966	February 21, 1966	Oop's asteroid
February 22, 1966	March 30, 1966	Young King Arthur and the dragon
March 31, 1966	May 9, 1966	Time-traveler from 2166, part two
May 10, 1966	July 15, 1966	The Moovian Men's Luncheon Club
July 16, 1966	October 15, 1966	Alley's weapons store
October 17, 1966	December 23, 1966	The king of Gee Whiz
December 24, 1966	February 14, 1967	The Neanderthals featuring Al "the beat" Oop
February 15, 1967	June 19, 1967	Moovian foreign aid
June 20, 1967	July 29, 1967	Moovian diplomacy
July 31, 1967	August 25, 1967	Moo's most eligible bachelor
August 26, 1967	October 21, 1967	The Princess of Neanderland
October 23, 1967	December 16, 1967	Umpa and King Baz
December 18, 1967	March 4, 1968	Youtopia
March 5, 1968	March 28, 1968	Building an asteroid deflector
March 29, 1968	May 27, 1968	Joe Keeno in Moo
May 28, 1968	June 24, 1968	Asteroid Icarus is deflected
June 25, 1968	August 22, 1968	Civil unrest in Moo
August 23, 1968	November 30, 1968	Ooola interviews Helen of Troy
December 2, 1968	March 14, 1969	Nefertiti's diet
March 15, 1969	April 23, 1969	Old comic-strip ghosts
April 24, 1969	June 17, 1969	Jason and the beanstalk
June 18, 1969	September 4, 1969	Oop and Ooola become astrologers
September 5, 1969	September 23, 1969	The brain machine
September 24, 1969	November 29, 1969	The Kiddy Korner franchise
December 1, 1969	February 27, 1970	King of the hill

==== 1970s ====
Start date	End date	Description
February 28, 1970	May 30, 1970	King Kingston of ancient Athens
June 1, 1970	September 12, 1970	The fabulous all-electric ghost car
September 14, 1970	November 27, 1970	Wonmug and the Gink
November 28, 1970	April 20, 1971	Carl the First, King of Lem (Wilberforce from The Born Loser appears in a cameo on 9/12)
April 21, 1971	June 10, 1971	Crown swapping with Guz and Tunk
June 11, 1971	August 23, 1971	Alley's new dinosaur KT
August 24, 1971	October 6, 1971	Clank, the far-out robot
October 7, 1971	January 8, 1972	The Zan of Zoron
January 10, 1972	January 29, 1972	Clank and Clink
January 31, 1972	March 23, 1972	Toko and Baldy's gang
March 24, 1972	May 4, 1972	Toko and Aunt Bella
May 5, 1972	June 22, 1972	The cook-off
June 23, 1972	July 24, 1972	Clank and Clunk
July 25, 1972	November 2, 1972	Clank at Ravensbeak Castle
November 3, 1972	December 12, 1972	Oop retrieves his ax from Bella
December 13, 1972	March 26, 1973	The giants of Dead Man's Lake
March 27, 1973	June 1, 1973	The plesiosaur hunt
June 2, 1973	September 15, 1973	Plesiosaurs in Loch Ness
September 17, 1973	December 21, 1973	The land of Dinnys
December 22, 1973	May 3, 1974	Booja berries and the Gink
May 4, 1974	August 2, 1974	Han Sin's kite
August 3, 1974	September 25, 1974	Orville Lurch and the Lurchmobile
September 26, 1974	November 30, 1974	In the land of Nerr
December 2, 1974	February 28, 1975	Kidnappers in Moo
March 1, 1975	March 8, 1975	On the road to Florida
March 10, 1975	June 2, 1975	The Thorn King of Nerr
June 3, 1975	November 12, 1975	Panamint City
November 13, 1975	June 15, 1976	The Texas Pterosaur Project
June 16, 1976	September 25, 1976	Alley meets Christopher Columbus
September 27, 1976	January 11, 1977	Alexander Dork's strength formula
January 12, 1977	February 28, 1977	Beebo and Harless
March 1, 1977	July 4, 1977	The Moovian migration
July 5, 1977	October 8, 1977	Princess Bahlinka
October 10, 1977	November 28, 1977	Doc's Uncle Peevill
November 29, 1977	February 17, 1978	The battle of Adrianople
February 18, 1978	May 26, 1978	Tunk's daughter Soooella
May 27, 1978	June 19, 1978	Time-machine modernized redesign
June 20, 1978	December 20, 1978	Delfon, land of living vegetables
December 21, 1978	March 2, 1979	Supersnoz, hero of Moo
March 3, 1979	April 10, 1979	Hooktooth the tyrannosaur
April 11, 1979	May 19, 1979	Ox and Mandy scout the lab
May 21, 1979	July 10, 1979	The land of cannibal giants
July 11, 1979	September 8, 1979	Otto Stain and the time-machine heist
September 10, 1979	November 26, 1979	Alley in Wonderland
November 27, 1979	December 6, 1979	The new lab
December 7, 1979	February 7, 1980	Lontoo, Sendak, and the Megawart

==== 1980s ====
Start date	End date	Description
February 8, 1980	April 17, 1980	The little people of Fog Island
April 18, 1980	July 15, 1980	The lost treasure of the Vinegar Bend Bunch
July 16, 1980	September 18, 1980	The seven cities of gold
September 19, 1980	December 12, 1980	Munda Wunch in Movieland
December 13, 1980	February 24, 1981	The Runt Brothers
February 25, 1981	April 6, 1981	Visitors from the 27th century
April 7, 1981	July 2, 1981	Senator Boozle in the Moovian government
July 3, 1981	September 7, 1981	Modern-age Dinny hunt
September 8, 1981	December 1, 1981	Draculina
December 2, 1981	February 5, 1982	Alley the stunt double
February 6, 1982	April 5, 1982	The Moovian zoo
April 6, 1982	June 12, 1982	Big Kaboom and the arms race
June 14, 1982	August 21, 1982	A visit to 2082
August 23, 1982	November 8, 1982	The Revolutionary War
November 9, 1982	January 15, 1983	Laabod's fitness classes
January 17, 1983	March 12, 1983	Melonball: Moo vs Lem
March 14, 1983	May 30, 1983	Moo elects a Congress
May 31, 1983	October 11, 1983	The Black Knight of WWI
October 12, 1983	January 16, 1984	Draculina returns
January 17, 1984	May 3, 1984	First Prehistoric International Olympics
May 4, 1984	August 15, 1984	Reforms in Upper Yorch
August 16, 1984	September 4, 1984	Brute's revenge
September 5, 1984	December 24, 1984	Ace Chung in Old San Francisco
December 25, 1984	March 23, 1985	Aliens on Fog Island
March 25, 1985	July 22, 1985	The holy-grail scam of Castle Blackrose
July 23, 1985	November 6, 1985	Cursed Queen Roweena of Redfern
November 7, 1985	January 20, 1986	The two-headed pterodactyl
January 21, 1986	April 21, 1986	Queen Mardo of the Land of No Return
April 22, 1986	August 11, 1986	King Koogie and Melba
August 12, 1986	September 29, 1986	Modernizing the time machine
September 30, 1986	January 31, 1987	Civil War: Confederate side
February 2, 1987	April 24, 1987	Larry Benn comes for Ava
April 25, 1987	August 15, 1987	Under the sea
August 17, 1987	November 20, 1987	Civil War: Union side
November 21, 1987	February 15, 1988	Zu Zu and the Lemian invasion
February 16, 1988	April 9, 1988	Alley becomes Grand Wizer
April 11, 1988	June 18, 1988	The search for Wizer's new beads
June 20, 1988	November 5, 1988	Corple and the Hubots of Talaxia
November 7, 1988	April 4, 1989	Redbeard and the Black Widow
April 5, 1989	May 9, 1989	Oop's new dinosaur Fang
May 10, 1989	September 18, 1989	Barry Nearside in Moo
September 19, 1989	January 15, 1990	The Moovian county fair

==== 1990s ====
Start date	End date	Description
January 16, 1990	May 24, 1990	The lost Frankenstank medallion
May 25, 1990	October 31, 1990	The Monarchs of Gorp
November 1, 1990	January 14, 1991	Two-Gun Jake in Colorado
January 15, 1991	July 4, 1991	K.T. Bono in witness protection
July 5, 1991	December 4, 1991	Marty and Nick in ancient Greece
December 5, 1991	February 4, 1992	Ava in Moo
February 5, 1992	May 16, 1992	King Garzak of Lem
May 18, 1992	October 5, 1992	The lost Zorax dragon
October 6, 1992	February 4, 1993	Contract Air-Mail Route Number Two (adapted in Alley Oop Adventures #3, March 2000)
February 5, 1993	June 25, 1993	Ontok, king of the Longtails
June 26, 1993	December 2, 1993	Pidali the artist thwarts the Lemian invasion
December 3, 1993	April 9, 1994	Catching baby dinos for the 20th-century zoo
April 11, 1994	April 26, 1994	Alley and Guz go fishing
April 27, 1994	June 28, 1994	Richard Petty helps corral an escaped dino
June 29, 1994	December 12, 1994	Orana's hypnosis stones
December 13, 1994	June 13, 1995	Blue-Two versus the Nightlings
June 14, 1995	July 17, 1995	Fruit and fishing in Moo
July 18, 1995	September 15, 1995	The Moovian reservoir
September 16, 1995	December 8, 1995	The Wizer's attraction extract
December 9, 1995	December 30, 1995	The Wizer needs a new hat
January 1, 1996	February 12, 1996	Alien fast food
February 13, 1996	April 8, 1996	Hunting the yellow-beaked blackwing
April 9, 1996	May 7, 1996	Pet-sitting
May 8, 1996	September 9, 1996	Seeking the Lemian star fendle
September 10, 1996	January 4, 1997	Granny in the Ghostlands
January 6, 1997	July 4, 1997	Theseus and the Minotaur
July 5, 1997	August 4, 1997	Ava and Alley vs two escaped felons
August 5, 1997	December 4, 1997	The Battle_of_Crécy
December 5, 1997	June 17, 1998	The Zan of Zoron returns
June 18, 1998	September 26, 1998	Umpa's Aunt Addy
September 28, 1998	November 30, 1998	Disposing of the Swamp Slug
December 1, 1998	February 6, 1999	Gillian Hoopster from 2153 visits Moo
February 8, 1999	February 27, 1999	Dermit the Hermit
March 1, 1999	April 6, 1999	A song for Umpa
April 7, 1999	December 6, 1999	"She" from the Land of Seven Peaks

==== 2000s ====
Start date	End date	Description
December 7, 1999	May 30, 2000	Ingarella and Socko the giant (May 27 is a tribute to Charles Schulz)
May 31, 2000	January 3, 2001	The Great Kafrak's colony
January 4, 2001	May 19, 2001	Vasco Da Gama
May 21, 2001	September 1, 2001	Gunfight at Dead Dog
September 3, 2001	September 10, 2001	Oop's surprise party (this is the Benders' first story)
September 11, 2001	January 23, 2002	Luke Slyme and the Moovian diamonds (featuring Harry Houdini)
January 24, 2002	July 1, 2002	Garzak and the Trojan dinosaur
July 2, 2002	July 12, 2002	Alley dreams of marriage
July 13, 2002	December 27, 2002	St George and Dinny the Dragon, alternating with Dave Wowee updating the time machine
December 28, 2002	July 16, 2003	Robert the Bruce and Dinny the Loch Ness monster (Robert is drawn to resemble Sean Connery)
July 17, 2003	September 30, 2003	Richard Feynman helps find time-lost Alley
October 1, 2003	November 1, 2003	Oscar and Alley leave
November 3, 2003	June 15, 2004	Dolf tries to conquer Moo and Lem
June 16, 2004	June 28, 2004	Alley proposes
June 29, 2004	September 10, 2004	Olympic wrestling history (featuring Milo of Croton, Frank Gotch, and Dan Gable)
September 11, 2004	September 30, 2004	Dave's new look
October 1, 2004	January 12, 2004	The Hunchback of Notre Dame alternating with Heck and Marko
January 13, 2004	February 18, 2005	Heck and Marko's Moovian oil scheme concludes
February 19, 2005	April 20, 2005	Jon Fish's tax scheme
April 21, 2005	July 14, 2005	Prisoners of Crimsonia
July 15, 2005	September 26, 2005	Mountain, strongest man in Moo
September 27, 2005	December 17, 2005	Tunk impersonates the Abdominal Snowman
December 19, 2005	March 6, 2006	Rudy Valentino's dance lessons
March 7, 2006	April 11, 2006	Tunk's lost crown
April 12, 2006	May 5, 2006	Moo's official historian
May 6, 2006	July 28, 2006	Moofest
July 29, 2006	December 8, 2006	Conquistadors in Moo (October 4 is a Dick Tracy 75th-anniversary salute)
December 9, 2006	December 29, 2006	Christmas Carol/Gift of the Magi
December 30, 2006	January 12, 2007	Oscar on the lam
January 13, 2007	March 14, 2007	Umpa for ruler
March 15, 2007	June 16, 2007	Oscar's revenge
June 18, 2007	July 27, 2007	Recovering Oscar and Dinny
July 28, 2007	September 21, 2007	The poisonous meteor
September 22, 2007	December 4, 2007	Will Rogers in Oklahoma Territory
December 5, 2007	December 17, 2007	Meet Earl Boom
December 18, 2007	April 26, 2008	Earlie Oop and the engagement ring
April 28, 2008	September 13, 2008	75th anniversary celebration
September 15, 2008	December 12, 2008	Dee's archeological expedition (November 24 is a 90th-anniversary tribute to Gasoline Alley)
December 13, 2008	December 29, 2008	Christmas with Ooola
December 30, 2008	January 19, 2009	Kids' dinosaur drawings
January 20, 2009	July 25, 2009	Ransoming the magic belt
July 27, 2009	January 25, 2010	Alley and Ooola don't get married

==== 2010s ====
Start date	End date	Description
January 26, 2010	May 24, 2010	The Lemian occupation
May 25, 2010	September 6, 2010	Building the Moovian border wall
September 7, 2010	February 12, 2011	Goob, replacement king
February 13, 2011	December 15, 2011	Earth-Two
December 16, 2011	March 31, 2012	Lola from Earth-Two in Moo
April 2, 2012	June 29, 2012	Lola heads to Mondovia
June 30, 2012	October 29, 2012	Mayan handball
October 30, 2012	January 1, 2013	Mayan doomsday prophecy
January 2, 2013	April 18, 2013	The Wizer's dinosaur invasion
April 19, 2013	July 11, 2013	Doowee, Moovian attorney
July 21, 2013	November 7, 2013	Villa Diodati
November 8, 2013	December 6, 2013	Alley's medical checkup
December 7, 2013	June 2, 2014	Ooola's Lemian adventure
June 3, 2014	May 18, 2015	Prehistoric World: the Movie (November 17 is a 50th-anniversary tribute to Wizard of Id)
May 19, 2015	July 20, 2015	Lost in Africa
July 21, 2015	September 1, 2015	Fixing the remote control
September 2, 2015	January 26, 2016	Lemian conquest of Moo
January 27, 2016	June 25, 2016	The Grand Wizer, Lemian spy
June 27, 2016	October 15, 2016	Oop as Grand Wizer
October 17, 2016	April 24, 2017	Volzon from Jantulle
April 25, 2017	July 31, 2017	The mind-control device
August 1, 2017	January 6, 2018	M.T. Mentis can't fix history
January 8, 2018	March 15, 2018	Outbreak and contagion in Moo
March 16, 2018	July 6, 2018	Hamilton and Washington
July 7, 2018	August 11, 2018	Modern conveniences
August 13, 2018	September 1, 2018	Back to Moo
September 2, 2018	January 5, 2019	reprints Villa Diodati and Alley's checkup from August 5 to December 10, 2013
January 6, 2019	May 20, 2019	The ransomed mixtape (this is Sayers and Lemon's first story)
May 21, 2019	June 1, 2019	Alley's new dinosaur Meggs
June 3, 2019	June 15, 2019	Wonmug catches up with Ava
June 17, 2019	September 5, 2019	Visiting Plato
September 6, 2019	November 8, 2019	Superintelligent prehistoric turtles

==== 2020s ====
The slug creature in the January 17, 2020, strip is an homage to V.T. Hamlin's Venusian beast from December 30, 1950.

Start date	End date	Description
November 9, 2019	February 1, 2020	On trial for time crimes
February 3, 2020	March 10, 2020	Boston Tea Party
March 11, 2020	April 25, 2020	Aliens and the Egyptian pyramids
April 27, 2020	June 24, 2020	Drew Copious tries to rule the multiverse
June 25, 2020	July 18, 2020	Finding Dinny
July 20, 2020	August 3, 2020	Ooola and the jewel thief
August 4, 2020	October 20, 2020	Future amusement park
October 21, 2020	November 2, 2020	Potato-chip rivalry
November 3, 2020	December 1, 2020	Ava and Zanzarr
December 2, 2020	January 30, 2021	The Coalition of Tiny Scientists
February 1, 2021	February 15, 2021	The cult of the Mighty Feather
February 16, 2021	April 10, 2021	The murder of Lady Worthington
April 11, 2021	June 16, 2021	The pinching chrabs of Universe 881
June 17, 2021	September 4, 2021	The Almighty Frodd on the moon
September 6, 2021	October 22, 2021	Prehistoric meteors

== See also ==
- Alley Award
- The Flintstones
- The Cavern Clan
