= Boys' Ranch =

Comic book series

Publication information
- Publisher: Harvey Comics
- Schedule: Bimonthly
- Format: Ongoing series
- Genre: Western
- Publication date: October 1950 – August 1951
- No. of issues: 6
- Main character(s): Clay Duncan; Dandy; Wabash; Angel; Wee Willie Weehawken; Happy Face; Palomino Sue; Geronimo

Creative team
- Created by: Joe Simon, Jack Kirby
- Artist(s): Mort Meskin; Marvin Stein

Collected editions
- Kid Cowboys of Boys' Ranch: ISBN 0-87135-859-X
- The Best of Simon and Kirby: ISBN 1-84576-931-7

Boys' Ranch is a six-issue American comic book series created by the veteran writer-artist team of Joe Simon and Jack Kirby for Harvey Comics in 1950. A Western in the then-prevalent "kid gang" vein popularized by such film series as "Our Gang" and "The Dead End Kids", the series starred three adolescents—Dandy, Wabash, and Angel—who operate a ranch that was bequeathed to them, under the adult supervision of frontiersman Clay Duncan. Supporting characters included Palomino Sue, Wee Willie Weehawken, citizens of the town Four Massacres, and various Native Americans, including a fictional version of the real-life Geronimo.

Noted for its use of single and double-page illustrations, the series has been lauded as one of Simon and Kirby's most significant creations. It was briefly revived through reprints in 1955, and all six issues were reprinted in a hardcover edition by Marvel Comics in 1991 with introductions by Jim Simon and Kirby.

== Publication history ==
Western-style adventures involving boys in ranch settings were already present in American popular culture with the juvenile fiction of authors such as Frank V. Webster and Dale Wilkins as well as the 1946 MGM film, Boys' Ranch. By the late 1940s, the writer-artist team of Joe Simon and Jack Kirby was enjoying the commercial success of the duo's Young Romance and Young Love romance comics titles, and had formed a studio that employed artists such as Mort Meskin, Steve Ditko, John Prentice, Marvin Stein, Bruno Premiani, George Roussos, Bill Draut, and others. In 1950, Simon & Kirby launched two new titles: Black Magic, for the Crestwood Publications imprint Prize Comics, and Boys' Ranch for Harvey Comics (which had previously published two short-lived Simon–Kirby titles, Stuntman and the Boy Explorers, in 1946).

According to a biographical page in one of the issues, Simon and Kirby claimed they had spent ten years researching what became Boys Ranch, traveling to Texas, Wyoming, and Arkansas. They were influenced by the films of early western actor and director William S. Hart. They had previously created the successful kid-gang features the Newsboy Legion and Boy Commandos for DC Comics.

Simon in his autobiography recounted a casual meeting in September 1950 with Superman co-creator Jerry Siegel, who had dropped by Harvey Comics' offices, and showing Siegel art from various upcoming series:

I reasoned it would do no harm to show him our products, since they were already in production. ... He lingered on the Boys' Ranch art. 'This is really a coincidence', he said ... 'I'm working on the same title'.

'Really?' I said. 'I'd like to see what you've done on it'.

'We'll be in touch', Jerry said. We shook hands and he departed.

Almost immediately after our Boys' Ranch went on sale, Harvey received a letter from Ziff-Davis Publications [for whom Siegel was working] accusing us of lifting the idea of Boys' Ranch from Jerry Siegel. [Harvey Comics head] Alfred Harvey requested to see their version. They had nothing to show. The matter ended there.

Joe Simon and Jack Kirby in their studio at work on the creation of the Boys' Ranch feature, 1950.

Launched in the wave of a western trend in American comic books, the series debuted with an October 1950 cover date as a 52-page, bimonthly series. It lasted six issues (Oct. 1950 – Aug. 1951). The original cover title was The Kid Cowboys of Boys' Ranch, shortened to Boys' Ranch after two issues; the subhead "Featuring Clay Duncan" remained throughout. Each issue featured a single page pinup at the beginning of the book along with a two-page centerspread. Each issue rounded off with various text and Western and Native American information pages such as "Boys' Ranch Club News", "How Cowboys Say It", "How To Ride a Horse", and "Now You Can Make Your Pair of Western Moccasins".

According to Harry Mendryk, Boys' Ranch comprises two distinct groups: "The first three issues featured work by Kirby (with one exception), had three stories per issue, and the stories were longer. For the final issues there is much less use of Kirby, only two stories per issue, and shorter stories. Actually each final issue had a single story, but broken into two chapters". The first three issues average around thirty story pages; the last three issues average about twenty. The last three feature special "theme" stories, the US Cavalry Army, the Pony Express, and the Great Train Robbery. At least one of the themes was inspired by John Ford films; issue #4 was thought to show an influence from Ford's 'Cavalry Trilogy'. Besides Simon and Kirby, Mort Meskin, Marvin Stein, and Charles Nicholas are credited as contributors in the latter issues, with Meskin given pencil and inks credits on "I'll fight you for Lucy!" and inks over Kirby pencils on "The Bugle Blows at Bloody Knife".

=== Reprints ===
The title was briefly revived through reprints in 1955. Penrod Shoes issued a giveaway coeval edition of Boys' Ranch #5 and #6, while issues #4 and #5 were reprinted by Harvey Thriller in Witches Western Tales (1955) #29–30, with further reprints in Western Tales #31–33.

Marvel Comics published Kid Cowboys of Boys Ranch, a hardcover reprint edition of all six issues in 1991 (ISBN 087135859X). A Boys' Ranch portfolio of illustrations from the original series' artwork appeared in Joe Simon's The Comic Book Makers in 2003. Some Boys' Ranch selections appeared in 2009 Titan Books anthology, The Best of Simon & Kirby (ISBN 1845769317).

== Characters and story ==
From left to right: Wabash, Wee Willie Weehawken, Angel, Happy Boy, Dandy, Palomino Sue, Clay Duncan

Clay Duncan is an Indian scout who serves as foreman at the Boys' Ranch. Modelled on frontiersman such as Kit Carson, Buffalo Bill Cody, and Davy Crockett, he serves as role model to the boy characters. While a young child, Duncan's parents were killed by bandits. He was rescued by a passing band of Apache Indians, and adopted by the Apache Running Bear, alongside his son, Geronimo. On reaching manhood, he left the Apache under the tutelage of Miles Freeman, a frontier scout. Running Bear's parting words were 'The war clouds darken once more over the white man and the Indian nations ... there is much need for warriors who talk peace to both sides! Freeman's words are that the great spirit has given you to us for such a mission'. He occasionally takes on other jobs such as army scout, mail delivery driver, and US Marshal. His horse's name is Ghost.

Dandy is a 'well-liked kid with a ready smile and a confident air' who served in the American Civil War. Usually depicted wearing a Union Army uniform, he left his adoptive parents from a small Ohio farm to explore the west. He has a noticeably greater active interest in the opposite sex, as exemplified in "I'll fight you for Lucy".

Wabash is an easy-going lad who "springs from the hill-folk" His dubious banjo-accompanied singing skills are a source of comedy relief. His family history is explicated in the Johnny Appleseed / Paul Bunyan-style tale "The Legend of Alby Fleezer".

Angel is a long-haired blond youth inspired by Billy the Kid. He is a skilled gunfighter, and possesses a fiery temper. Nicknamed 'the fire-eatin', lead-throwin' angel', when first meeting Clay Duncan, he presents himself thus: "Got not peeve! I live alone ... and I want to be left alone! I ain't like other kids! They got mothers and fathers to fuss over 'em! Well, I don't need nobody! Nobody! I kin handle myself against any man!" His horse's name is Paint.

Wee Willie Weehawken is the first arrival at Boys' Ranch. Styled the "oldest boy at Boys' Ranch" due to his advanced years, he cooks the meals at the ranch. "A very dangerous dude!", Boys' Ranch #1 reveals he had been a lawyer in his youth.

Happy Boy is a young Native American boy who appeared at the ranch one day. Never appearing on the cover, he does appear in one of the pin-up illustrations. He begins to communicate using sign language in Boys' Ranch #6 and plays a more prominent role in the story "Happy Boy carries the ball".

Palomino Sue hails from Abilene, Texas. Her father was a wagon master. She arrived at Boys' Ranch after a trip on the wagon her father was driving was intercepted by Indians. She was the only survivor. When expressing a desire to get involved in fighting, Clay Duncan insists that, because it is too dangerous for a woman, she must remain at the ranch. She agrees, but her acquiescence was a pretence, as she later joins the fray, offering opportune assistance. Similar scenes recur in her two subsequent appearances in issues #5 and 6.

Geronimo is portrayed as a fierce Apache military leader. As the son of Running Bear, he was a boyhood companion to Clay Duncan. Resentful of Duncan's position in the tribe, they become bitter rivals in "The Clay Duncan Story".

Various Native American tribes appear as protagonists throughout. The conflict between Caucasians and American Indians is often the result of manipulation and exploitation by dishonest Caucasians. For example, in issue #2, Comanche and Blackfoot tribes are falsely told by white traffickers that their land will be seized so they can sell them rifles. In issue #5, the Apache Indians are blamed for robbing mail wagons, but in reality the perpetrators were white robbers using subterfuge to place blame on the Apaches.

The début issue opens with the chance meeting of Dandy and Wabash, who had been on opposite sides of the then recent Civil War, but became friends and decided to head out West together. Meanwhile, Clay Duncan meets up with Angel and the four come together in the defence of a ranch belonging to Jason Harper against an attack by Apache warriors. The story reveals Geronimo is the leader of that band when he joins the fray to order the band's retreat. As his dying act, he bequeathed the ranch to the youngsters for use as a shelter for homeless boys. They are later joined by Wee Willie Weehawken, because he was a middle-aged man, cited the technicality that the will didn't specify the maximum age to qualify as a "boy". Happy Boy joins the ranch shortly after. The ranch is near a town called Four Massacres.

== Critical analysis ==
=== Series commentary ===
Boys' Ranch has become one of Simon and Kirby's most critically acclaimed creations and was held in high esteem by both creators. R. J. Vitone qualifies the series as having "much more depth than previous S & K kid-gang strips – the basic elements that had made the romance and crime books so thematically strong were applied here as well". Mendryk points out a certain drop of quality in later issues: "It was part of the Simon and Kirby modus operandi to make heavy use of Kirby's talents in the early issues of a new title and afterwards make more frequent use of other artists. For Boys' Ranch the change seems much more dramatic then in other titles. The last three issues are good, but they are not the masterpieces that the earlier issues were".

"Mother Delilah": Boys' Ranch #3, p. 7

According to Richard Morrissey, Simon and Kirby's final effort in the "kid gang" genre showed signs of evolving in new directions: "In Boys' Ranch, Kirby seemed to be attempting to be going beyond his previous limitations ... More and more, the team was abandoning adolescent adventure for more adult concerns ... more than one observer has noted the similarities between the kid gangs of the '40s and early '50s with the adult teams of the late '50s and early '60s".

=== Mother Delilah ===
The first story from issue #3, "Mother Delilah", has been singled out as one of Simon and Kirby's finest. Kirby has cited it as a personal favorite, and it has received accolades by critics, comic book professionals and fans alike.

A 20-page tale of betrayal, revenge, and redemption referencing the similarly themed biblical story of Samson and Delilah, the story features Clay Duncan, Angel, and Delilah Barker, a character influenced by Marlene Dietrich's character from Destry Rides Again. A character named Virgil Underwood provides a Greek chorus-like background commentary: "Those who find love are indeed fortunate, but woe betide them who demand it"; the story's final panel reads:

And thus it ends. But ever to repeat
Again and again in reality and rhyme –
Love's ever new as morning's dew,
And hate is as old as time".

Analyzing the story, R. C. Harvey concludes with: "From hate springs the desire for vengeance, and that desire, as Angel discovers, is debilitating. And even love can turn to hate unless love's motive is a giving spirit. But a giving love is the ultimate redemption".
