= Kirby Krackle =

Stylistic device commonly used in sci-fi, superhero and fantasy comics

Fantastic Four #72 (March 1968). Cover art by Jack Kirby and Joe Sinnott. The pseudo-fractal nature of the red light comes from the negative space created by the Kirby dots.

The Kirby Krackle (also known as Kirby Dots) is an artistic convention in superhero and science fiction comic books and similar illustrations, in which a field of black is used to represent negative space around unspecified kinds of energy. It is typically used in illustrations of explosions, smoke, blasts from ray guns, "cosmic" energy, and outer space phenomena.

== History ==
The effect is named after its creator, comic artist Jack Kirby. While the Kirby Krackle in its mature form first appeared in Kirby's work during 1965–1966 (in Fantastic Four and Thor), comics historian Harry Mendryk of the Jack Kirby Museum & Research Center has traced the earliest version of the stylistic device as far back as 1940 to Jack Kirby and Joe Simon's Blue Bolt #5. As Joe Simon was the inker on that comic, he may have been partially responsible for the look of the proto-Kirby Krackle. Examples of a transitional form of the Kirby Krackle appear in two of Kirby's stories from the late 1950s: The Man Who Collected Planets from 1957 (pencils and inks by Kirby) and The Negative Man from 1959 (inks attributed to Marvin Stein). The effects were used during the transformation sequences in the Ben 10 franchise.

Kirby Krackle is incorporated into the design of the Guardians of the Galaxy – Mission: Breakout! attraction in Avengers Campus at Disney California Adventure, and Moon Girl and Devil Dinosaur.

== Analysis ==
Philosophy professor and author Jeffrey J. Kripal wrote:

For Kirby, the human body is a manifestation or crystallization of finally inexplicable energies—a superbody. [...] What Mesmer called animal magnetism, Reichenbach knew as the blue od, and Reich saw as a radiating blue cosmic orgone becomes in Jack Kirby a trademark energetics signaled by "burst lines" and a unique energy field of black, blobby dots that has come to be affectionately known as the "Kirby Krackle" [...]. The final result was a vision of the human being as a body of frozen energy that, like an atomic bomb, could be released with stunning effects, for good or for evil. These metaphysical energies, I want to suggest, constitute the secret Source of Kirby's art.
