= Crime comics =

Comic genre

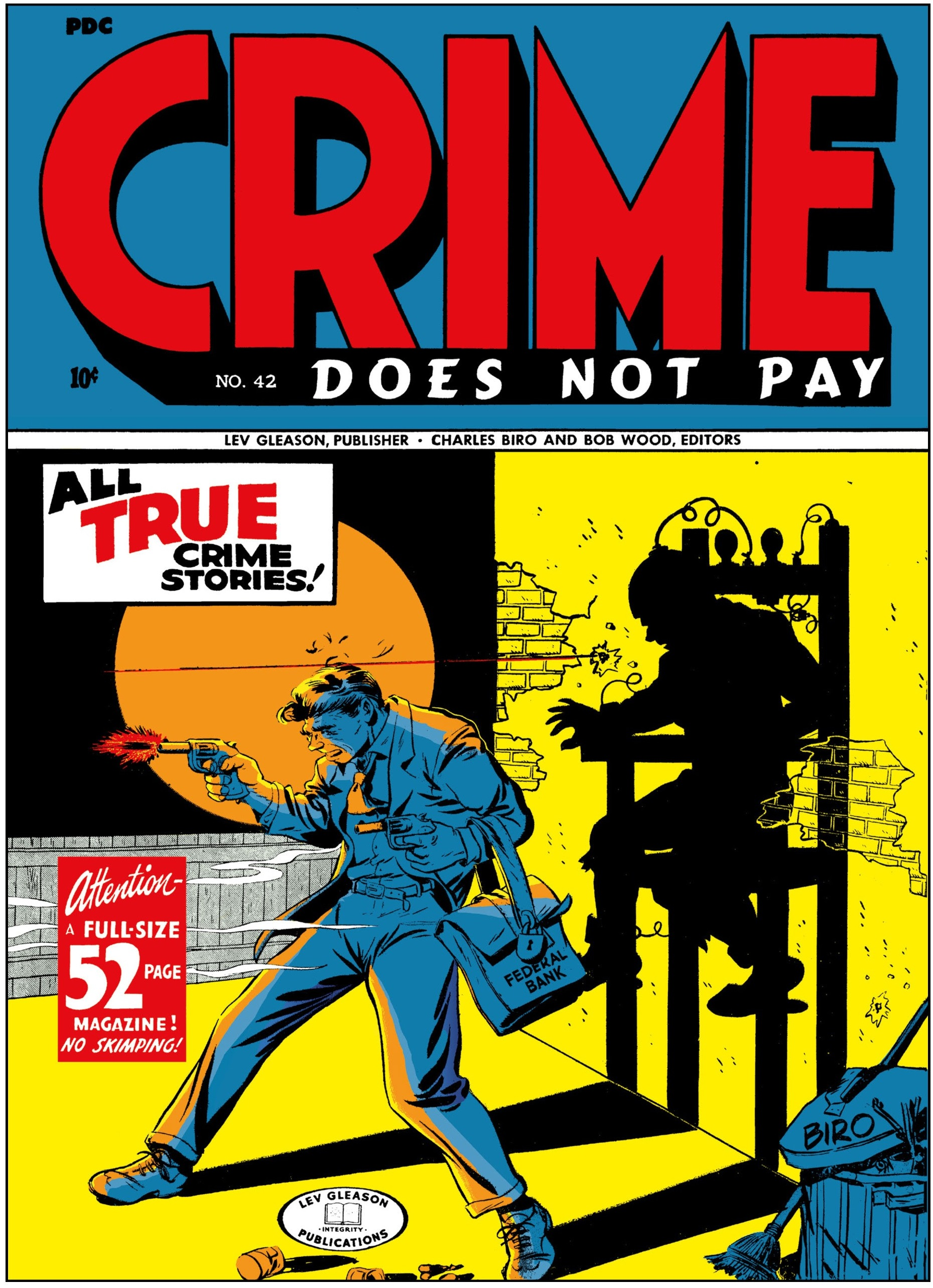
- Cover to an issue of Crime Does Not Pay, one of the earliest crime comics
- Publishers: EC Comics; Lev Gleason Publications
- Publications: Crime Does Not Pay; True Crime Comics; Crime SuspenStories; Shock SuspenStories; Sin City

Crime comics is a genre of American comic books and format of crime fiction. The genre was originally popular in the late 1940s and early 1950s and is marked by a moralistic editorial tone and graphic depictions of violence and criminal activity. Crime comics began in 1942 with the publication of Crime Does Not Pay published by Lev Gleason Publications and edited by Charles Biro. As sales for superhero comic books declined in the years after World War II, other publishers began to emulate the popular format, content and subject matter of Crime Does Not Pay, leading to a deluge of crime-themed comics. Crime and horror comics, especially those published by EC Comics, came under official scrutiny in the late 1940s and early 1950s, leading to legislation in Canada and the United Kingdom, the creation in the United States of the Comics Magazine Association of America and the imposition of the Comics Code Authority in 1954. This code placed limits on the degree and kind of criminal activity that could be depicted in American comic books, effectively sounding the death knell for crime comics and their adult themes.

== Precursors ==
Petty thieves, grifters, and outright crooks have existed in American comic books and strips since their inception, while books and strips devoted to them and their activities are relatively rare. The comic strip Dick Tracy was the first to focus on the character and plots of a vast array of gangsters. Chester Gould's strip, begun in 1931, made effective use of grotesque villains, actual police methods, and shocking depictions of violence. It inspired many features starring a variety of police, detectives and lawyers.

== Series ==
=== Crime Does Not Pay ===
As edited and mostly written by Charles Biro (with Bob Wood), Crime Does Not Pay was a 64-page (later 52-page) anthology comic book published by Lev Gleason Publications beginning in 1942 and running for 147 issues until 1955. Each issue of the series featured several stories about the lives of actual criminals taken from newspaper accounts, history books, and occasionally, as advertised, "actual police files." The stories provided details of actual criminal activity and, in making the protagonists of the stories actual criminals — albeit criminals who were eventually caught and punished, usually in a violent manner, by story's end — seemed to glorify criminal activity, according to several critics. An immediate success, the series remained virtually unchallenged in the field of non-fiction comic books for several years until the post-World War II decline in other genres of comic books, including superhero comic books, made it more viable to publish new genres.

=== Magazine Village, Prize and EC Comics ===
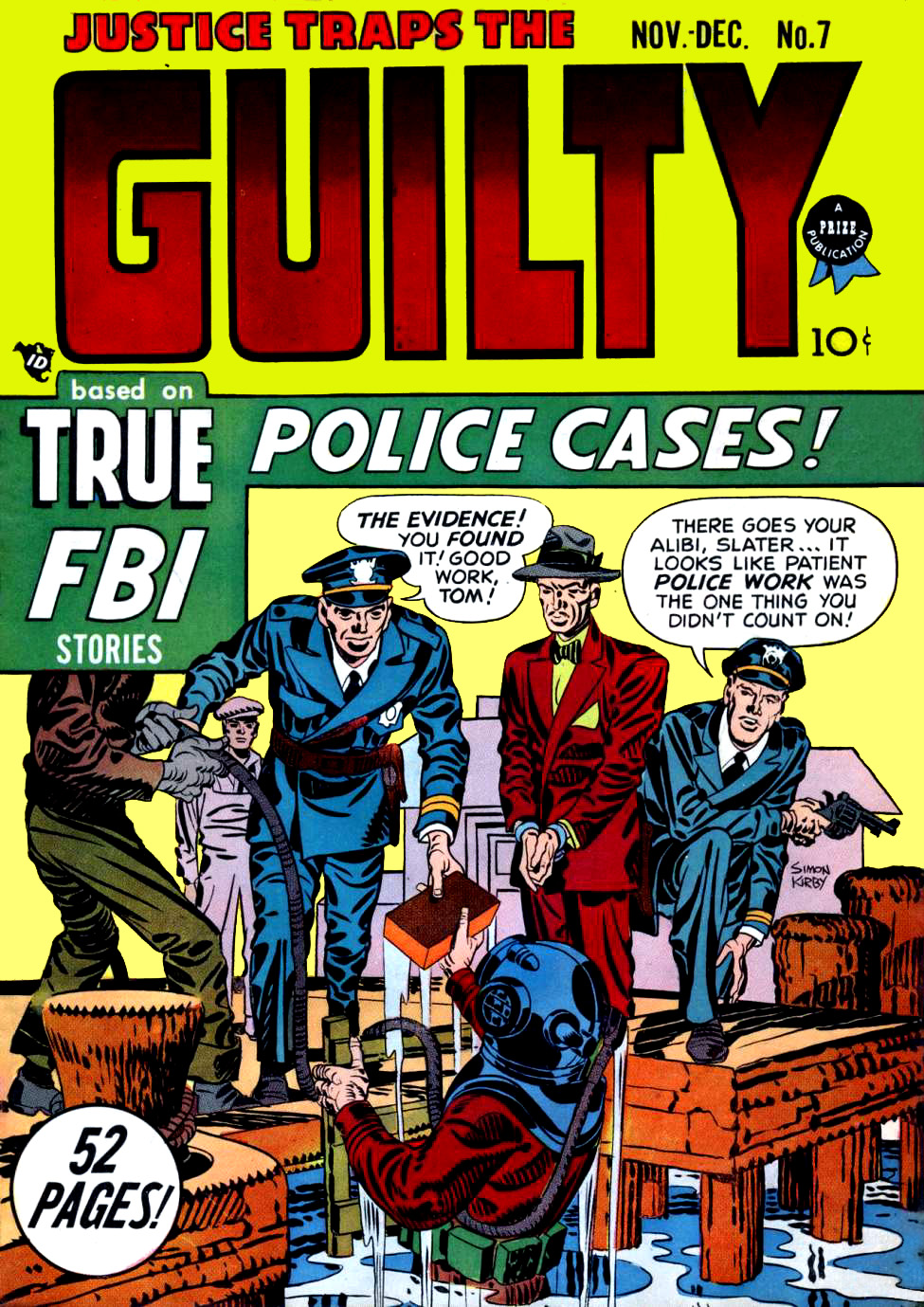
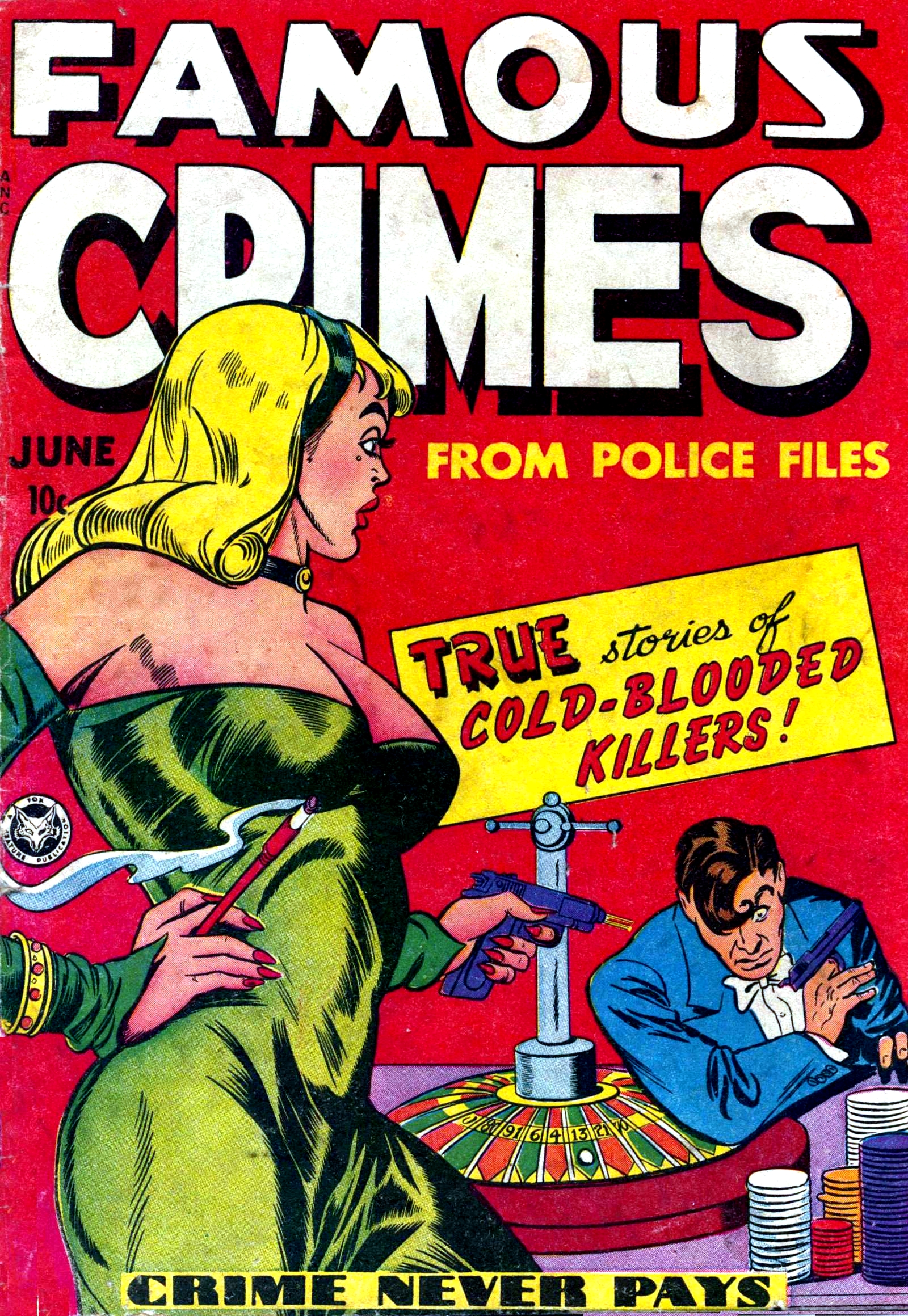
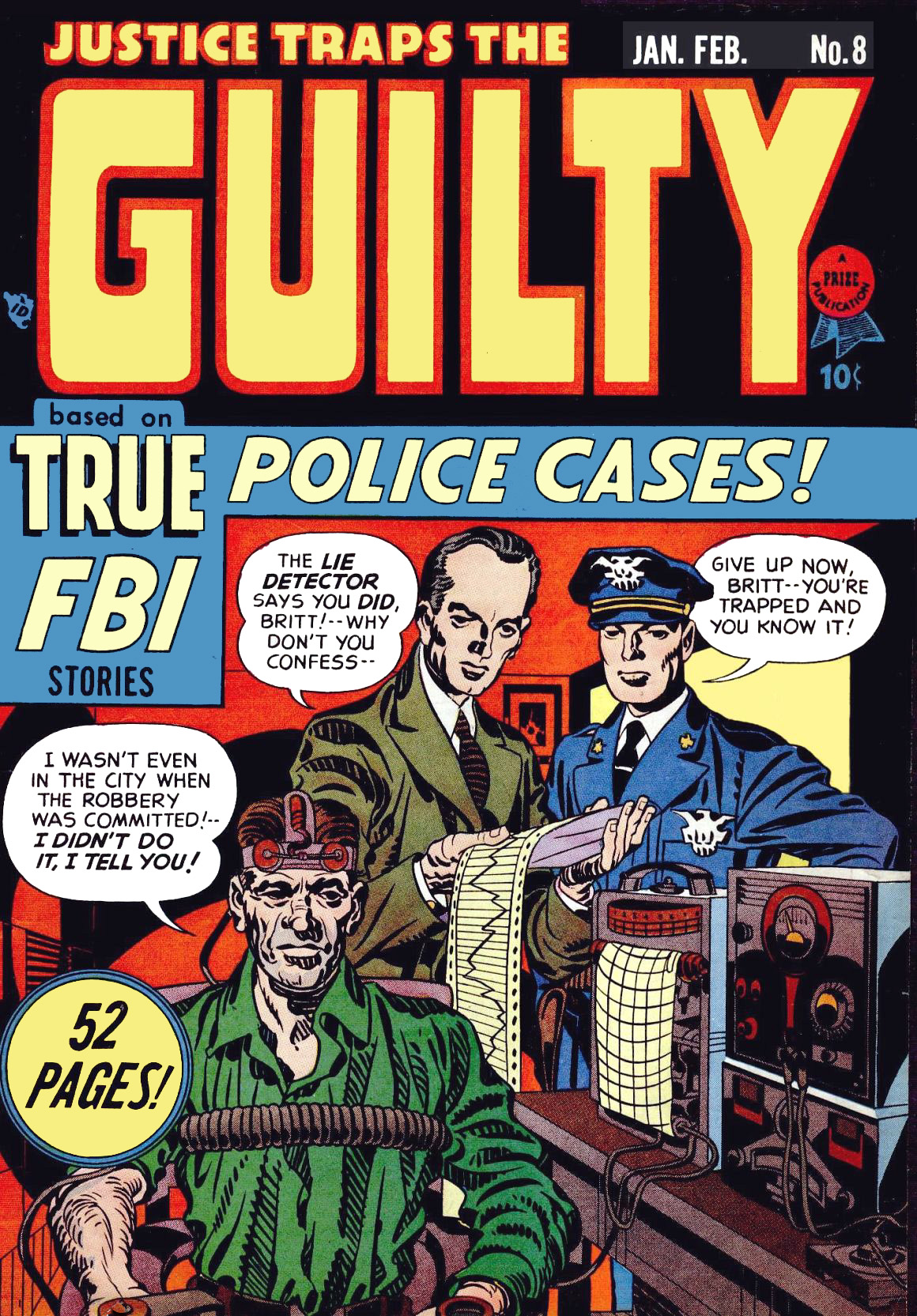

Beginning in 1947, publishers began issuing new titles in the crime comics genre, sometimes changing the direction of existing series but often creating new books whole cloth. Many of these titles were direct imitations of the format and content of Crime Does Not Pay.

In May, 1947, Arthur Bernhard's Magazine Village company published True Crime Comics, designed and edited by Jack Cole. The first issue (#2) featured Cole's "Murder, Morphine, and Me", the story of a young female drug addict who became involved with gangsters. The story would become one of the most controversial of the period and samples of the art, including a panel from a dream sequence in which the heroine has her eye held open and threatened with a hypodermic needle, would be used in articles and books (like Geoffrey Wagner's Parade of Pleasure) about the pernicious influence and obscene imagery of crime comics.

Later in 1947, the team of Joe Simon and Jack Kirby began packaging a pair of crime comics for the Prize Comics line. Headline Comics (with a cover date of March) was transformed from adventure to a crime theme. Published with a date of October/November, Justice Traps the Guilty was a full-fledged crime comic from the onset, and besides Simon and Kirby, featured art by Marvin Stein, Mort Meskin, and John Severin. At the same time, Simon and Kirby revitalized Real Clue Comics for Hillman Comics, giving the title a true-crime veneer and transforming it from a serial character-driven mystery title.

EC Comics began publishing Crime SuspenStories in 1950 and Shock SuspenStories in 1952. Both titles featured, in the manner of the EC horror comics, fictional noir-style stories of murder and revenge with stunning art and tightly plotted twist endings.

== Backlash ==
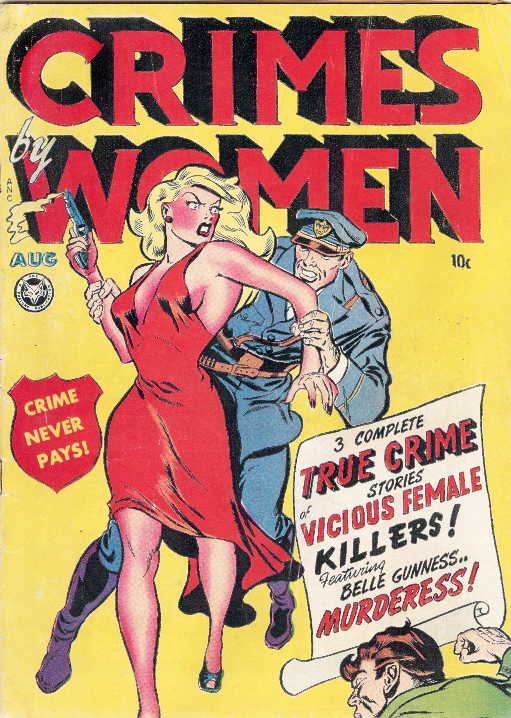
Crimes by Women, Aug 1948

In 1949, spearheaded by the campaigning of MP Davie Fulton, crime comics were banned in Canada in Bill 10 of the 21st Canadian Parliament's 1st session (informally known as the Fulton Bill). The Criminal Code defined crime comics as a magazine, periodical or book that exclusively or substantially comprises matter depicting pictorially (a) the commission of crimes, real or fictitious; or (b) events connected with the commission of crimes, real or fictitious, whether occurring before or after the commission of the crime and made it an offence to produce, publish or distribute them. The provisions remained in the Criminal Code until December 2018 when Bill C-51 was adopted during the 42nd Canadian Parliament. Previously, crime comics also could be ordered forfeited by the provincial courts.

== Post-Golden Age ==
Mystery, crime, and horror stories appeared in a number of anthology titles from various publishers but it was not until the advent of Warren Publishing's Creepy and Eerie in 1964 that the occasional crime story with a modicum of the style or violence that marked the comics of the late 1940s and early 1950s appeared.

Meanwhile, the genre had developed substantially in the hands of European and Japanese creators. In Europe, creators like Vittorio Giardino, Jacques Tardi, José Muñoz, Carlos Sampayo, William Vance and Jean Van Hamme have devoted substantial portions of their oeuvres to crime comics, especially to stories concerned with the trappings of detective fiction and police procedurals, often with a cynical, existentialist bent. Japanese creators like Osamu Tezuka (MW, The Book of Human Insects), Akimi Yoshida (Banana Fish), Takao Saito (Golgo 13), and Kazuo Koike (Crying Freeman) have explored subject matter ranging from the criminal mind to Yakuza gangs in manga form.

American crime comics of the 1970s included Jack Kirby's In the Days of the Mob and Gil Kane's Savage.

In the 1980s, Max Allan Collins and Terry Beatty created the Ms. Tree series about the adventures of a female private investigator. Collins would go on to write the Road to Perdition graphic novels about 1930s gangsters.

Beginning in the late-1980s and 1990s, several American and British comic book writers have created notable work in the crime comics genre, sometimes incorporating noir themes and novelistic storytelling into realistic crime dramas and even into superhero comics. These writers include Brian Azzarello (100 Bullets, Jonny Double), Brian Michael Bendis (Sam and Twitch, Jinx, Powers, Alias), Ed Brubaker (Gotham Central, Criminal), Frank Miller, David Lapham, John Wagner (A History of Violence, Button Man), and Paul Grist.
