= Marvin Stein =

- Born: February 11, 1925 Brooklyn, New York, U.S.
- Died: February 11, 2010 (aged 85) Florida, U.S.
- Area: Artist
- Spouse: Florence Lennowitz

Marvin Stein (February 11, 1925 – February 11, 2010) was an American comic book artist who also worked in animation, advertising, illustration and television broadcast graphics.

== Biography ==
Stein was born and raised in Brooklyn, New York, the son of a sign painter. Stein graduated from the Pratt Institute, and went to work for the Chesler Studio, which supplied comic stories and art to the comic book industry. Stein worked on Captain Valiant for Croyden Publications between 1944 and 1946, and the Funnyman daily and Sunday syndicated strip, and Superboy and Boy Commandoes for National Comics/DC. Stein joined the Simon & Kirby Studio and worked on myriad titles — Black Magic, Headline, Justice Traps the Guilty, Young Love and Young Romance — while freelancing for several other publishers, including Atlas, Feature Comics, Prize Comics, and Ziff Davis.

In 1958, he left comics to work in advertising and broadcast news graphics. From 1965 to 1969, he illustrated the syndicated McGurk's Mob with Bud Wexler for Newsday. Stein also worked illustrating children's books.
