= I Hate the Internet =

2016 novel by Jarett Kobek

- Author: Jarett Kobek
- Language: English
- Genre: Fiction
- Published: February 9, 2016
- Publisher: We Heard You Like Books
- Publication place: United States
- Pages: 288
- ISBN: 9780996421805

I Hate the Internet is a novel by Jarett Kobek published in 2016. The novel follows Adeline, a semi-famous, middle-aged comic book artist, and other San Francisco residents as they attempt to navigate a world increasingly liberated by the freedoms of speech provided through Twitter. After a video of Adeline voicing controversial opinions is posted on the Internet, she spends much of the novel attempting to remedy her negative online reputation. The novel is presented as a non-linear narrative with tangential commentary on real-world people and events, as well as the story of Adeline and her friends.

== Plot ==
Adeline, the protagonist, grew up in Pasadena, California with her mother Suzanne, who became an alcoholic after the death of her husband. During her time in California, Adeline adopts a transatlantic accent from watching Audrey Hepburn in Breakfast at Tiffany's. In 1986, she relocates to New York City, where she meets her soon-to-be best friend Baby. Baby saved her by beating up her cheating boyfriend. The two of them go back to live with Adeline's mother in Pasadena in 1988. Two years later Adeline graduates from Parsons University. In 1993, Adeline moves in with Jeremy Winterbloss and his wife Minerva when they go to San Francisco in 1996. While living with them, Adeline finds she is pregnant. The father was her boyfriend at the time, Nash Mac. Around this time, Jeremy and Adeline decide to produce a comic called Trill, a fictional story about an anthropomorphic cat. Jeremy writes, while Adeline illustrates.

Due to the perceived racist and sexist nature of the comic book industry, Adeline and Jeremy decide to write under the pseudonyms J.W. Bloss and M. Abrahamovic Petrovitch, respectively. The comic becomes somewhat successful, and is offered a movie deal. During movie production, Adeline meets writer J. Karacehennem and they become friends. Jeremy and Adeline's true identities remain a secret until a producer accidentally reveals them in a press conference. This projects Adeline and Jeremy into semi-fame. Meanwhile, Adeline gives birth and names her son Emil after her late brother who committed suicide. When Emil is 12, he decides that Adeline is weird with her funny way of speaking and odd opinions. He becomes embarrassed by her and asks to go live with his dad. Adeline agrees because she will still get to see him most weekends. That is until Emil is sent to live with Suzanne and Adeline is no longer able to get in contact with him. This leads to the Emil and Adeline becoming estranged.

Baby is a gay science fiction writer. One of his books, Annie Zero, receives a notable amount of success. At a party for the book, Adeline meets Christine, a transgender woman. The two instantly become friends, as neither have read Baby's book. Christine invites Adeline to a dinner party. There, Adeline meets Erik Willems. Willems recognizes Adeline from the movie production of Trill. The two begin a relationship.

J. Karacehennem moves to San Francisco in 2010 and takes Adeline to many social events where she meets Kevin Killian. They become good friends. In 2013, Kevin Killian asks Adeline to speak in front of one of his classes. In her talk, Adeline appears unable to remain on topic. She frequently switches from topic to topic, from women in technology to Beyoncé and Rihanna. These opinions are unpopular among youth and frequent Internet users, and she is a 45-year-old woman speaking out against things that the younger generation loves. Little does she know one of the students recorded her whole rant and posted it on YouTube.

The following morning, Adeline wakes to find she has begun to receive hate mail. She calls Jeremy about what to do. He tells her to get a Twitter and respond. Next, she calls J. Karacehennem. He tells her to just let it pass over, that at least it is boosting the sale of Trill after 10 years. Baby doesn't pick up the phone, Erik isn't really paying attention to what is happening, and Christine says that Twitter isn't her thing.

An article surfaces of an interview of when Adeline was still pretending to be a Russian man (under her pseudonym, M. Abrahamovic Petrovich). She is branded as misogynistic. Adeline, frustrated, decides to battle these claims and creates a Twitter account. She tweets her opinions. While some of them are agreeable, many of them are not and are quite embarrassing. Her use of Twitter causes Emil to reach out to her. Emil says he finds her use of Twitter embarrassing. The video of her speech has gone viral and people even come up to her in the streets asking if she is the woman from YouTube. She takes to lying to them and saying that she is actually Marina Abramović, as the two share a resemblance. Adeline finally tweets something that makes Jeremy tell her to stop tweeting and emails are flooding in yet again about Adeline.

J. Karacehennem tells Adeline that he and his girlfriend are moving because of the gentrification. Adeline is scared that if they are leaving, the others will soon follow. Adeline visits Christine. She tells Adeline that after she gets married, she, too, is moving out of San Francisco.

On J. Karacehennem's last night in San Francisco, he and Adeline go to the top of the Twin Peaks. He starts to scream at San Francisco, about everything he finds wrong with the city. Adeline simply watches.

Suddenly it's New Year's Eve and Adeline is at a party with people that she barely knows. She leaves and meets with Minerva and one of her partners, Salaam. Someone finally recognizes her as Adeline and she is unable to get away by pretending to be Marina Abramović. As Adeline leaves, she asks to meet up with Erik. Erik is annoyed with Adeline's strange style of speaking and leaves her standing on the street. Adeline starts walking. As a Google Bus passes her, her phone buzzes with a death threat on Twitter.

== Characters ==
Character Names	Description
Adeline	Adeline is a "central personage" of the novel. She is a mid-forty illustrator/comic book artist from Pasadena, California. Adeline came from a rich family. In the 90's, she adopted a transatlantic accent (using words such as "darling" frequently) after watching the film Breakfast at Tiffany's.
Jeremy Winterbloss	Jeremy worked with Adeline on their comic book series, Trill. He was the writer.
Felix Trill	Felix the main character of Adeline and Jeremy's comic series Trill. Felix is an anthropomorphic cat that moved through a quasi-medieval world, discovering haunting vistas while he battles other anthropomorphic animals.
J. Karacehennem	J is a friend and former lover of Adeline's whose last name is Turkish for “Black Hell.”
Baby	Baby is Adeline's gay best friend. He is a science fiction writer and author of Annie Zero.
Jack Kirby	Jack Kirby was a creative genius who never graduated from high school. He was Jewish, which led to him begin drawing comics about beating Nazis. He also helped create many of Marvel’s famous characters such as The Avengers, Black Panther, Doctor Doom, and Ant-Man.
Kevin Killian	Kevin is a talented narrative writer whose better known books were Shy and Impossible Princess. Kevin taught in the MFA program at the California College of Arts. He is the teacher of the student who posted the video of Adeline's rant on Internet.
Erik Willems	Erik works with information and Internet start-up companies. He is very wealthy and likes juvenile literature. He also has sexual relations with Adeline.
Ellen Flitcraft	Ellen is a twenty year old woman raised by her grandmother and lives in New Mexico. She attended UCLA and graduated from their film school.
Christine	Christine works as an assistant librarian at UCSF’s Parnassus campus.

== Themes ==
=== Race and gentrification ===
I Hate the Internet contains a single central theme: the Internet is the enemy of the intellect. The novel mentions the popularity of Twitter among the black community, which Kobek states is ironic because Twitter was responsible for "revitalizing" (gentrifying) a poor, primarily black neighborhood to house their headquarters. I Hate The Internet defines gentrification as "what happened to a city when people with an excess capital wanted their capital to produce more capital while not attributing any value to labor." As the use of Twitter, specifically in the black community, increased, Twitter's advertising revenue rose. Kobek explains the intellectual property of the "Black Twitter" users was profitable to a social media network that does not support the black community. In Chapter 32, J. Karacehennem discusses the perceived maliciousness of the Internet, and how protesting on the Internet is not going to be successful. The social media sites people use to protest are only making money for the sites.

=== Jack Kirby ===
Jack Kirby was the original creator of many notable Marvel characters and series, including The Fantastic Four, The Incredible Hulk, and Dr. Doom. Kirby is described as being “the individual most screwed by the American comic book industry. Kobek describes the American comic book industry as “the perfect distillation of all the corrupt and venal behavior inherent in unregulated capitalism.” He worked-for-hire for Marvel Comics. In the novel work-for-hire was described as “one of the many bad deals that businesses offered to creative people ... we pay you enough to eat and we keep everything you create.” While working for Marvel, Kirby created Captain America, the Fantastic Four, the original X-Men, the Avengers, Thor, Loki, Iron Man, the Incredible Hulk, and Ant-Man.

== Critical reception ==
I Hate the Internet has received generally positive reviews, including from both The New York Times and The Guardian. Dwight Garner of The New York Times offered his take on the book as well, “My advice? Log-off Twitter for a day. Pick this up instead." Steven Poole of The Guardian described the novel as an “enraged comedy” full of one-liners.
