= Black Magic (comics) =

1950 American comic book series

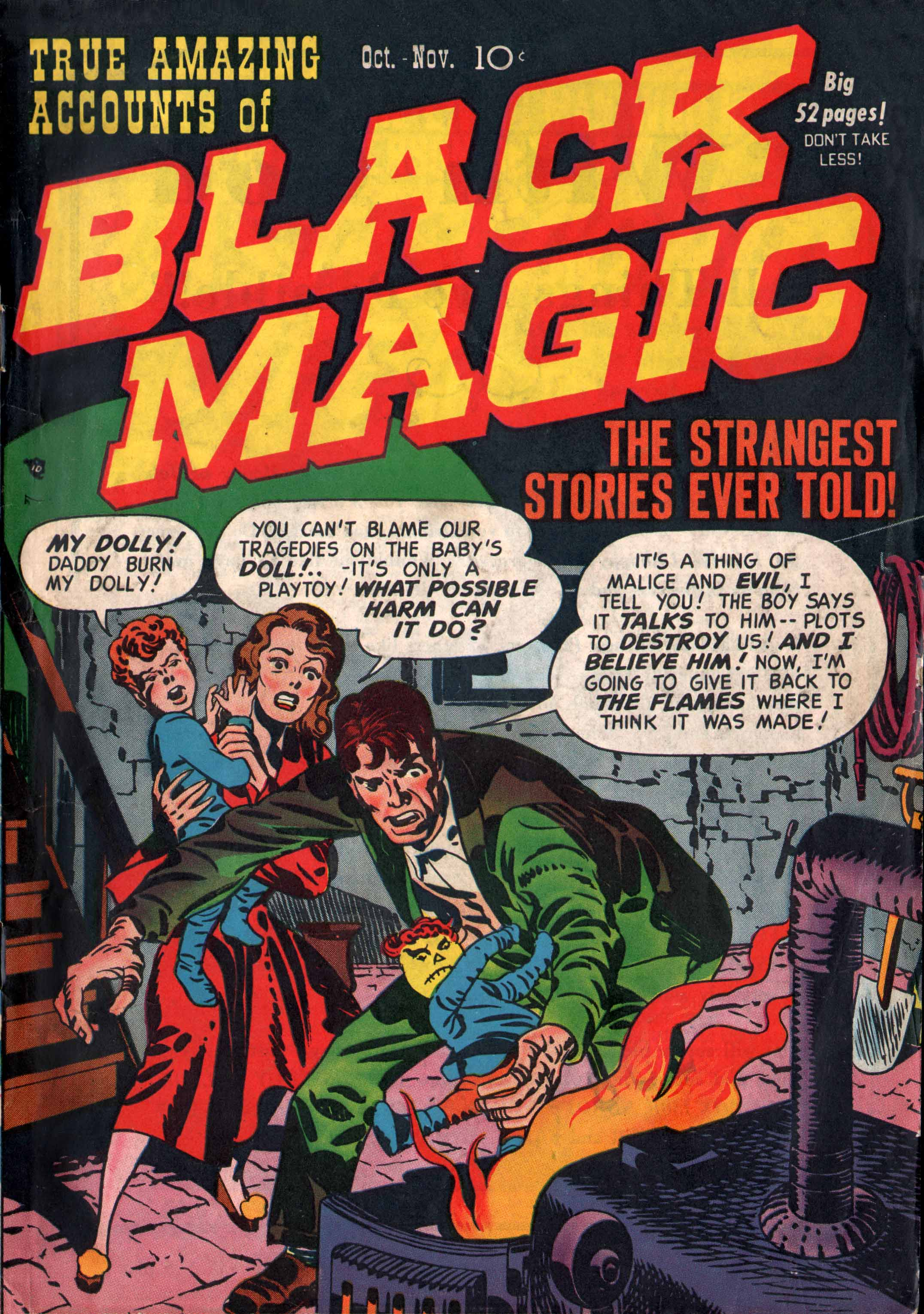
- Black Magic #1 (October–November 1950); Art by Jack Kirby

Publication information
- Publisher: Prize Comics; DC Comics
- Schedule: bimonthly
- Publication date: Oct./Nov. 1950-Nov./Dec. 1961 (Prize); Oct./Nov. 1973-Apr./May. 1975 (DC)
- No. of issues: 50 (Prize); 9 (DC)

Creative team
- Created by: Joe Simon; Jack Kirby

Black Magic was a horror anthology comic book series published by American company Prize Comics from 1950 to 1961. The series was packaged by the creative duo Joe Simon and Jack Kirby, and featured non-gory horror content.

After 50 issues as Black Magic, the title's numbering continued for three more issues as the humor comic Cool Cat before being canceled.

== DC reprint title ==
In 1973–1975, DC Comics published a nine-issue series reprinting Simon–Kirby material from the earlier series. The new incarnation featured new covers with the same logo as the earlier issues of the Prize series. The reprint issues generally grouped the stories by theme; for example, all the stories in issue #1 dealt with intolerance toward human oddities, while all the stories in #4 were about death.
