= Jack Kirby =

American comic book artist (1917–1994)

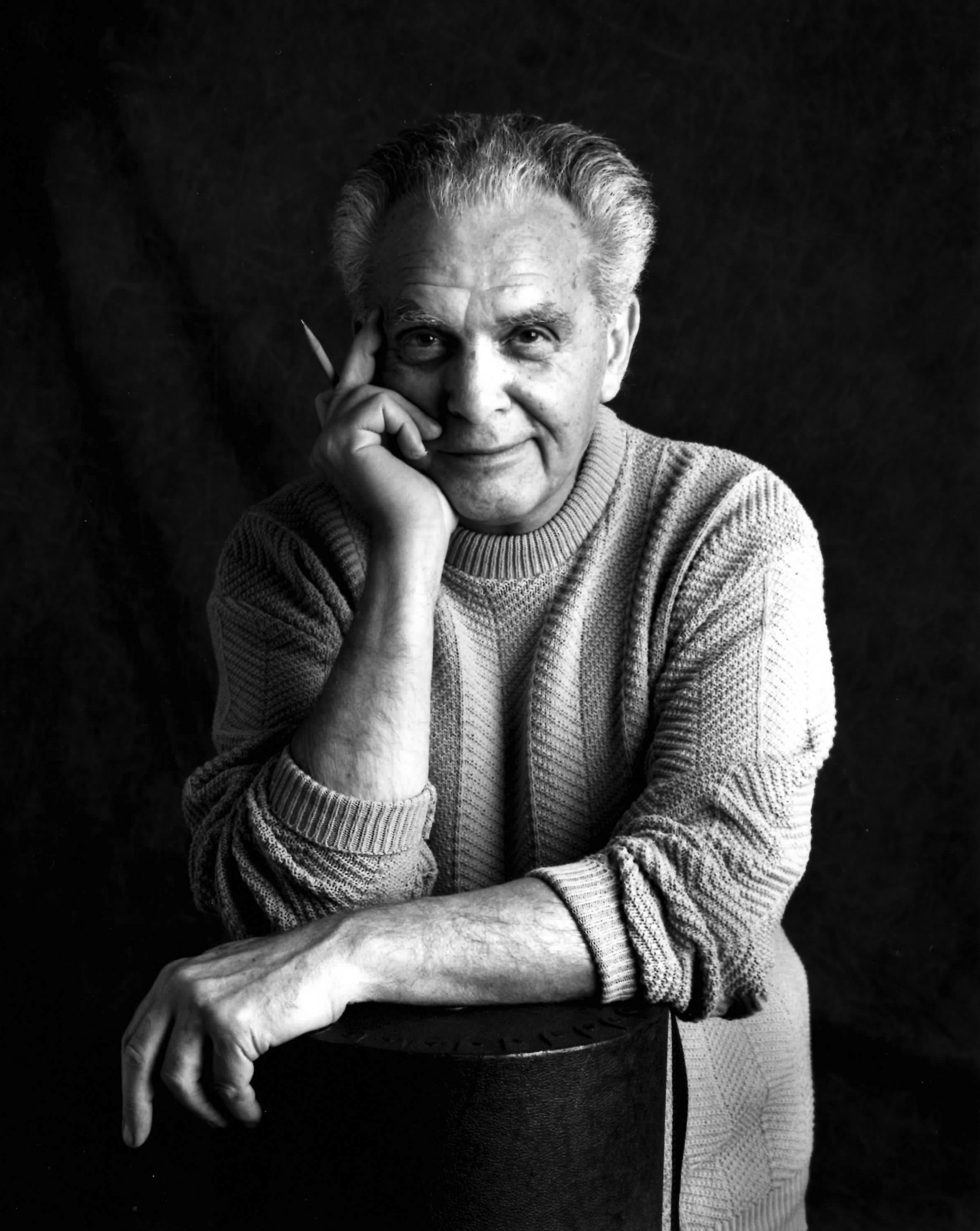
- Kirby in 1992
- Born: Jacob Kurtzberg; August 28, 1917 New York City, U.S.
- Died: February 6, 1994 (aged 76) Thousand Oaks, California, U.S.
- Pseudonyms: Jack Curtiss; Curt Davis; Lance Kirby; Ted Grey; Charles Nicholas; Fred Sande; Teddy; The King
- Notable works: Fantastic Four; Fourth World; Thor; Captain America; Eternals; New Gods; Black Panther
- Awards: Alley Award; Shazam Award; Inkpot Award; Will Eisner Hall of Fame; Bill Finger Award; Disney Legends
- Spouse: Rosalind Goldstein (m. 1942)
- Children: 4

Jack Kirby (/ˈkɜːrbi/; born Jacob Kurtzberg; August 28, 1917 – February 6, 1994) was an American comic book artist, widely regarded as one of the medium's major innovators and one of its most prolific and influential creators. He grew up in New York City and learned to draw cartoon figures by tracing characters from comic strips and editorial cartoons. He entered the nascent comics industry in the 1930s, drawing various comics features under different pen names, including Jack Curtiss, before settling on Jack Kirby. In 1940, he and writer-editor Joe Simon created the highly successful superhero character Captain America for Timely Comics, predecessor of Marvel Comics. During the 1940s, Kirby regularly teamed with Simon, creating numerous characters for that company and for National Comics Publications, later to become DC Comics.

After serving in the European Theater in World War II, Kirby produced work for DC Comics, Harvey Comics, Hillman Periodicals and other publishers. At Crestwood Publications, he and Simon created the genre of romance comics and later founded their own short-lived comic company, Mainline Publications. Kirby was involved in Timely's 1950s iteration, Atlas Comics, which in the next decade became Marvel. There, in the 1960s, Kirby co-created many of the company's major characters, including Ant-Man, the Avengers, the Black Panther, the Fantastic Four, the Hulk, Iron Man, the Silver Surfer, Thor, and the X-Men, among many others. Kirby's titles garnered high sales and critical acclaim, but in 1970, feeling he had been treated unfairly, largely in the realm of authorship credit and creators' rights, Kirby left the company for rival DC.

At DC, Kirby created his Fourth World saga which spanned several comics titles. While these series proved commercially unsuccessful and were canceled, the Fourth World's New Gods have continued as a significant part of the DC Universe. Kirby returned to Marvel briefly in the mid-to-late 1970s, then ventured into television animation and independent comics. In his later years, Kirby, who has been called "the William Blake of comics", began receiving great recognition in the mainstream press for his career accomplishments, and in 1987 he was one of the three inaugural inductees of the Will Eisner Comic Book Hall of Fame. In 2017, Kirby was posthumously named a Disney Legend for his creations not only in the field of publishing, but also because those creations formed the basis for The Walt Disney Company's financially and critically successful media franchise, the Marvel Cinematic Universe.

The Jack Kirby Awards and Jack Kirby Hall of Fame were named in his honor, and he is known as "The King" among comics fans for his many influential contributions to the medium.

== Early life (1917–1935) ==
Jack Kirby was born Jacob Kurtzberg on August 28, 1917, at 147 Essex Street on the Lower East Side of Manhattan in New York City; he grew up there. His parents, Rose (Bernstein) and Benjamin Kurtzberg, were Austrian-Jewish immigrants, and his father earned a living as a garment factory worker. In his youth, Kirby desired to escape his neighborhood. He liked to draw, and sought out places he could learn more about art. Essentially self-taught, Kirby cited among his influences the comic strip artists Milton Caniff, Hal Foster, and Alex Raymond, as well as such editorial cartoonists as C. H. Sykes, "Ding" Darling, and Rollin Kirby. He was rejected by the Educational Alliance because he drew "too fast with charcoal", according to Kirby. He later found an outlet for his skills by drawing cartoons for the newspaper of the Boys Brotherhood Republic, a "miniature city" on East 3rd Street where street kids ran their own government.

At age 14, Kirby enrolled at the Pratt Institute in Brooklyn, leaving after a week. "I wasn't the kind of student that Pratt was looking for. They wanted people who would work on something forever. I didn't want to work on any project forever. I intended to get things done".

== Career ==
=== Entry into comics (1936–1941) ===
Captain America Comics #1 (cover-dated March 1941); cover art by Kirby and Joe Simon

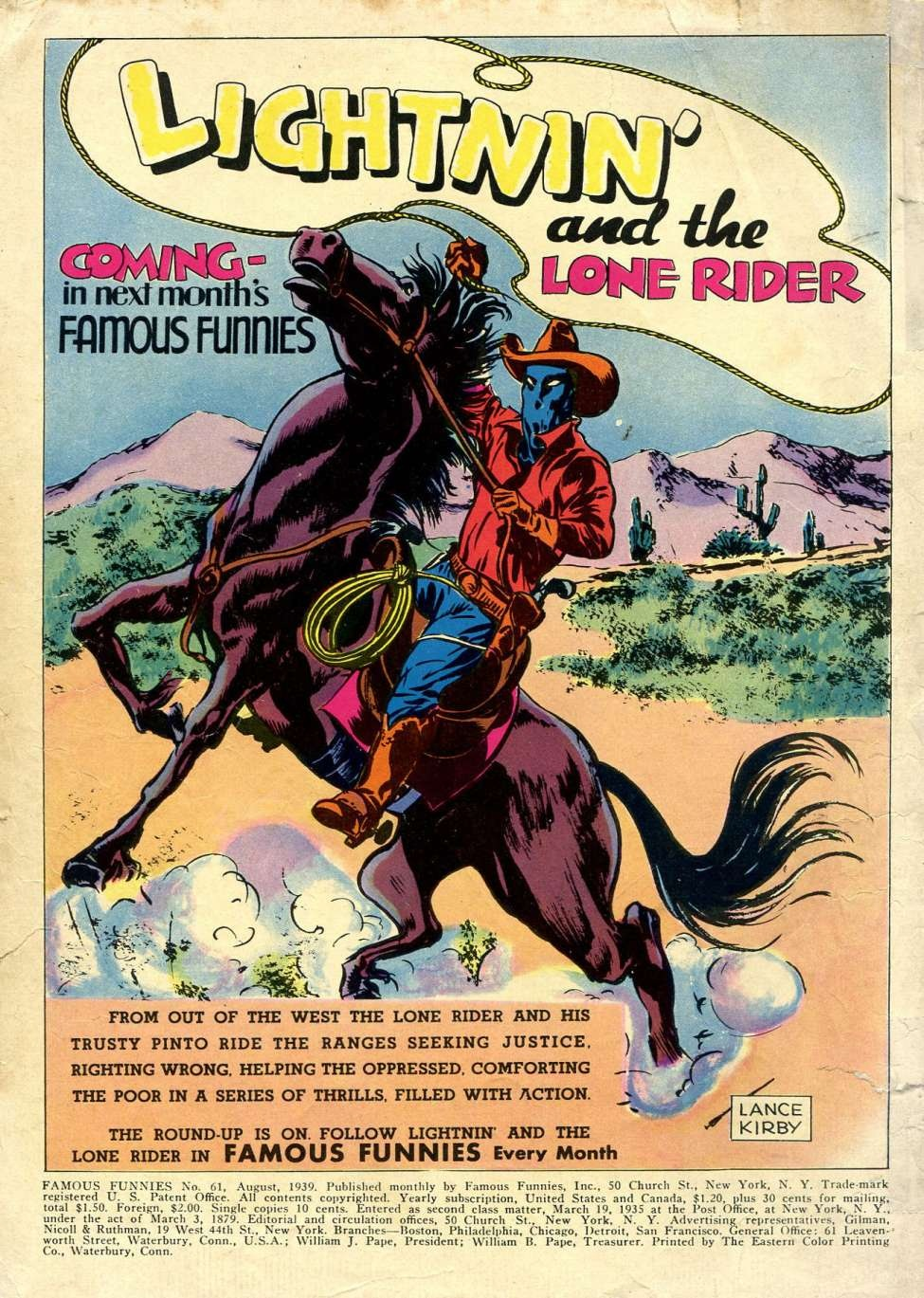
Lightnin' And The Lone Rider, ad from Famous Funnies #61 (August 1939)

Kirby joined the Lincoln Newspaper Syndicate in 1936, working there on newspaper comic strips and on single-panel advice cartoons such as Your Health Comes First!!! (under the pseudonym Jack Curtiss). He remained until late 1939, when he began working for the theatrical animation company Fleischer Studios as an inbetweener (an artist who fills in the action between major-movement frames) on Popeye cartoons at the same time in 1935. He left the studio before the Fleischer strike in 1937. "I went from Lincoln to Fleischer," he recalled. "From Fleischer I had to get out in a hurry because I couldn't take that kind of thing," describing it as "a factory in a sense, like my father's factory. They were manufacturing pictures."

Around that time, the American comic book industry was booming. Kirby began writing and drawing for the comic book packager Eisner & Iger, one of a handful of firms creating comics on demand for publishers. Through that company, Kirby did what he remembered as his first comic book work, for Wild Boy Magazine. This included such strips as the science fiction adventure "The Diary of Dr. Hayward" (under the pseudonym Curt Davis), the Western crimefighter feature "Wilton of the West" (as Fred Sande), the swashbuckler adventure "The Count of Monte Cristo" (again as Jack Curtiss), and the humor features "Abdul Jones" (as Ted Grey) and "Socko the Seadog" (as Teddy), all variously for Jumbo Comics and other Eisner-Iger clients.

For Robert W. Farrell's Associated Features Syndicate, he first used the surname Kirby as the pseudonymous Lance Kirby in the comic strip Lightnin' and the Lone Rider, written by Farrell in 1939 and later reprinted in Eastern Color Printing's Famous Funnies (1939-1940). He ultimately settled on the pen name Jack Kirby because it reminded him of actor James Cagney. However, he took offense to those who suggested he changed his name in order to hide his Jewish heritage.

=== Partnership with Joe Simon ===
Kirby moved on to comic-book publisher and newspaper syndicator Fox Feature Syndicate, earning a then-reasonable $15-a-week salary. During this time, Kirby met and began collaborating with cartoonist and Fox editor Joe Simon, who in addition to his staff work continued to freelance. Simon recalled in 1988, "I loved Jack's work and the first time I saw it I couldn't believe what I was seeing. He asked if we could do some freelance work together. I was delighted and I took him over to my little office. We worked from the second issue of Blue Bolt through... about 25 years."

After leaving Fox and collaborating on the premiere issue of Fawcett Comics' Captain Marvel Adventures ([March] 1941), the first solo title for the previously introduced superhero, and for which Kirby was told to mimic creator C.C. Beck's drawing style, the duo were hired on staff at pulp magazine publisher Martin Goodman's Timely Comics (later to become Marvel Comics). There Simon and Kirby created the patriotic superhero Captain America in late 1940. Simon, who became the company's editor, with Kirby as art director, said he negotiated with Goodman to give the duo 25 percent of the profits from the feature. The first issue of Captain America Comics, released in early 1941, sold out in days, and the second issue's print run was set at over a million copies. The title's success established the team as a notable creative force in the industry. After the first issue was published, Simon asked Kirby to join the Timely staff as the company's art director.

With the success of the Captain America character, Simon said he felt that Goodman was not paying the pair the promised percentage of profits, and so sought work for the two of them at National Comics Publications (later renamed DC Comics). Kirby and Simon negotiated a deal that would pay them a combined $500 a week, as opposed to the $75 and $85 they respectively earned at Timely. The pair feared Goodman would not pay them if he found they were moving to National, but many people knew of their plan, including Timely editorial assistant Stan Lee. When Goodman eventually discovered it, he told Simon and Kirby to leave after finishing work on Captain America Comics #10. Kirby was bitterly convinced it was specifically Lee who betrayed them, ignoring Simon's willingness to give him the benefit of the doubt.

Kirby and Simon spent their first weeks at National trying to devise new characters while the company sought how best to utilize the pair. After a few failed editor-assigned ghosting assignments, National's Jack Liebowitz told them to "just do what you want". The pair then revamped the Sandman feature in Adventure Comics and created the superhero Manhunter. In July 1942 they began the Boy Commandos feature. The ongoing "kid gang" series of the same name, launched later that same year, was the creative team's first National feature to graduate into its own title. It sold over a million copies a month, becoming National's third best-selling title. They scored a hit with the homefront kid-gang team, the Newsboy Legion, featuring in Star-Spangled Comics. In 2010, DC Comics writer and executive Paul Levitz observed that "Like Jerry Siegel and Joe Shuster, the creative team of Joe Simon and Jack Kirby was a mark of quality and a proven track record."

==== World War II (1943–1945) ====
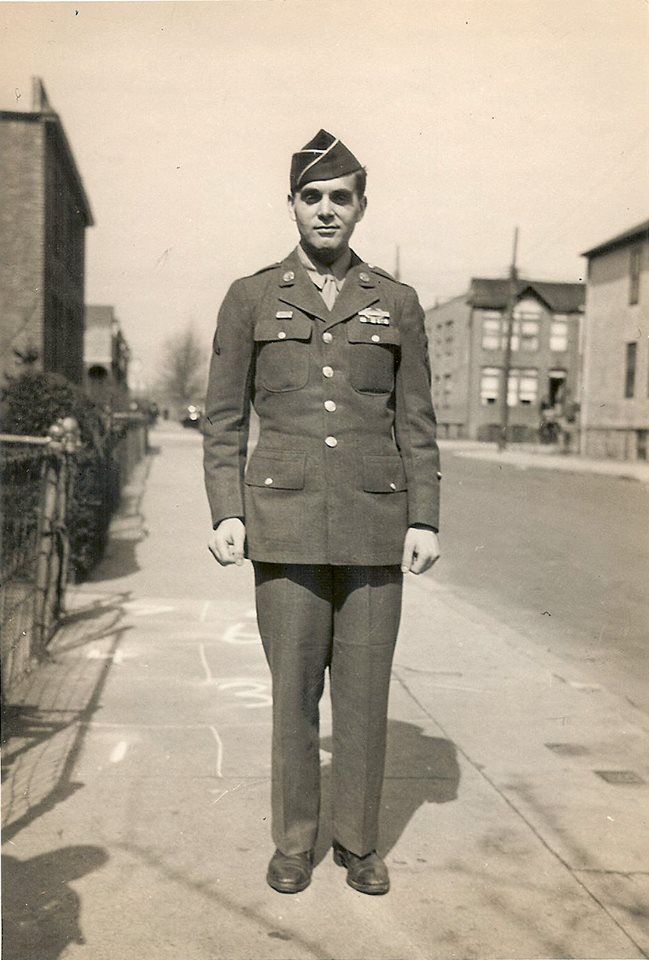
Kirby in the U.S. Army during World War II

With World War II underway, Liebowitz expected that Simon and Kirby would be drafted, so he asked the artists to create an inventory of material to be published in their absence. The pair hired writers, inkers, letterers, and colorists in order to create a year's worth of material. Kirby was drafted into the U.S. Army on June 7, 1943. After basic training at Camp Stewart, near Savannah, Georgia, he was assigned to Company F of the 11th Infantry Regiment. He landed on Omaha Beach in Normandy on August 23, 1944, 2 1/2 months after D-Day, although Kirby's reminiscences would place his arrival just 10 days after. Kirby recalled that a lieutenant, learning that comics artist Kirby was in his command, made him a scout who would advance into towns and draw reconnaissance maps and pictures, an extremely dangerous duty.

==== Postwar career (1946–1955) ====
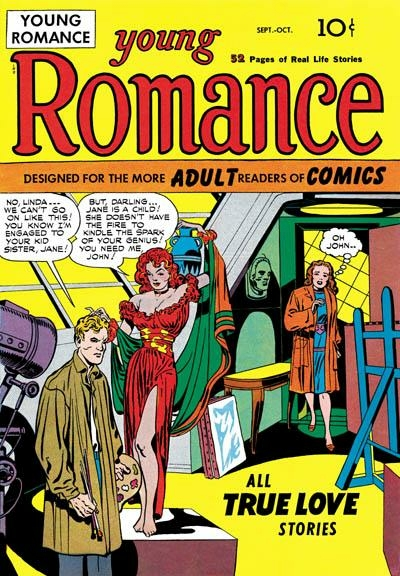
Young Romance #1 (Oct. 1947); cover art by Kirby and Simon

After the war, Simon arranged work for Kirby and himself at Harvey Comics, where, through the early 1950s, the duo created such titles as the kid-gang adventure Boy Explorers Comics, the kid-gang Western Boys' Ranch, the superhero comic Stuntman, and, in vogue with the fad for 3D movies, Captain 3-D. Simon and Kirby additionally freelanced for Hillman Periodicals (the crime-fiction comic Real Clue Crime) and for Crestwood Publications (Justice Traps the Guilty).

The team had its greatest success in the postwar period by creating romance comics. Simon, inspired by Macfadden Publications' romantic-confession magazine True Story, transplanted the idea to comic books and with Kirby created a first-issue mock-up of Young Romance. Showing it to Crestwood general manager Maurice Rosenfeld, Simon asked for 50% of the comic's profits. Crestwood publishers Teddy Epstein and Mike Bleier agreed, stipulating that the creators would take no money up front. Young Romance #1 (cover-date Oct. 1947) "became Jack and Joe's biggest hit in years". The first title sold a staggering 92% of its print run, inspiring Crestwood to increase the print run by the third issue to triple the initial number of copies. Initially published bimonthly, Young Romance quickly became a monthly title and produced the spin-off Young Love—together the two titles sold two million copies per month, according to Simon—later joined by Young Brides. Young Romance spawned dozens of imitators from publishers such as Timely, Fawcett, Quality, and Fox Feature Syndicate. Despite the glut, the Simon and Kirby romance titles continued to sell millions of copies a month.

Bitter that Timely Comics' 1950s iteration, Atlas Comics, had relaunched Captain America in a new series in 1954, Kirby and Simon created Fighting American. Simon recalled, "We thought we'd show them how to do Captain America". While the comic book initially portrayed the protagonist as an anti-Communist dramatic hero, Simon and Kirby turned the series into a superhero satire with the second issue, in the aftermath of the Army-McCarthy hearings and the public backlash against the Red-baiting U.S. Senator Joseph McCarthy.

=== After Simon (1956–1957) ===
At the urging of a Crestwood salesman, Kirby and Simon launched their own comics company, Mainline Publications, securing a distribution deal with Leader News in late 1953 or early 1954, subletting space from their friend Al Harvey's Harvey Publications at 1860 Broadway. Mainline, which existed from 1954 to 1955, published four titles: the Western Bullseye: Western Scout; the war comic Foxhole because EC Comics and Atlas Comics were having success with war comics, but promoting theirs as being written and drawn by actual veterans; In Love because their earlier romance comic Young Love was still being widely imitated; and the crime comic Police Trap, which claimed to be based on genuine accounts by law-enforcement officials. After the duo rearranged and republished artwork from an old Crestwood story in In Love, Crestwood refused to pay the team, who sought an audit of Crestwood's finances. Upon review, the pair's attorneys stated the company owed them $130,000 for work done over the past seven years. Crestwood paid them $10,000 in addition to their recent delayed payments. The partnership between Kirby and Simon had become strained. Simon left the industry for a career in advertising, while Kirby continued to freelance. "He wanted to do other things and I stuck with comics," Kirby recalled in 1971. "It was fine. There was no reason to continue the partnership and we parted friends."

At this point in the mid-1950s, Kirby made a temporary return to the former Timely Comics, now known as Atlas Comics, the direct predecessor of Marvel Comics. Inker Frank Giacoia had approached editor-in-chief Stan Lee for work and suggested he could "get Kirby back here to pencil some stuff." While freelancing for National Comics Publications, the future DC Comics, Kirby drew 20 stories for Atlas from 1956 to 1957: Beginning with the five-page "Mine Field" in Battleground #14 (Nov. 1956), Kirby penciled and in some cases inked (with his wife, Roz) and wrote stories of the Western hero Black Rider, the Fu Manchu-like Yellow Claw, and more. But in 1957, distribution troubles caused the "Atlas implosion" that resulted in several series being dropped and no new material being assigned for many months. The next year Kirby returned to the nascent Marvel.

For DC around that time, Kirby co-created with writers Dick and Dave Wood the non-superpowered adventuring quartet the Challengers of the Unknown in Showcase #6 (Feb. 1957), while contributing to such anthologies as House of Mystery. During 30 months freelancing for DC, Kirby drew slightly more than 600 pages, which included 11 six-page Green Arrow stories in World's Finest Comics and Adventure Comics that, in a rarity, Kirby inked himself. Kirby recast the archer as a science-fiction hero, moving him away from his Batman-formula roots, but, in the process, alienating Green Arrow co-creator Mort Weisinger.

He began drawing Sky Masters of the Space Force, a newspaper comic strip, written by the Wood brothers and initially inked by the unrelated Wally Wood. Kirby left National Comics Publications due largely to a contractual dispute in which editor Jack Schiff, who had been involved in getting Kirby and the Wood brothers the Sky Masters contract, claimed he was due royalties from Kirby's share of the strip's profits. Schiff successfully sued Kirby. Some DC editors had criticized him over art details, such as not drawing "the shoelaces on a cavalryman's boots" and showing a Native American "mounting his horse from the wrong side."

=== Marvel Comics in the Silver Age (1958–1970) ===
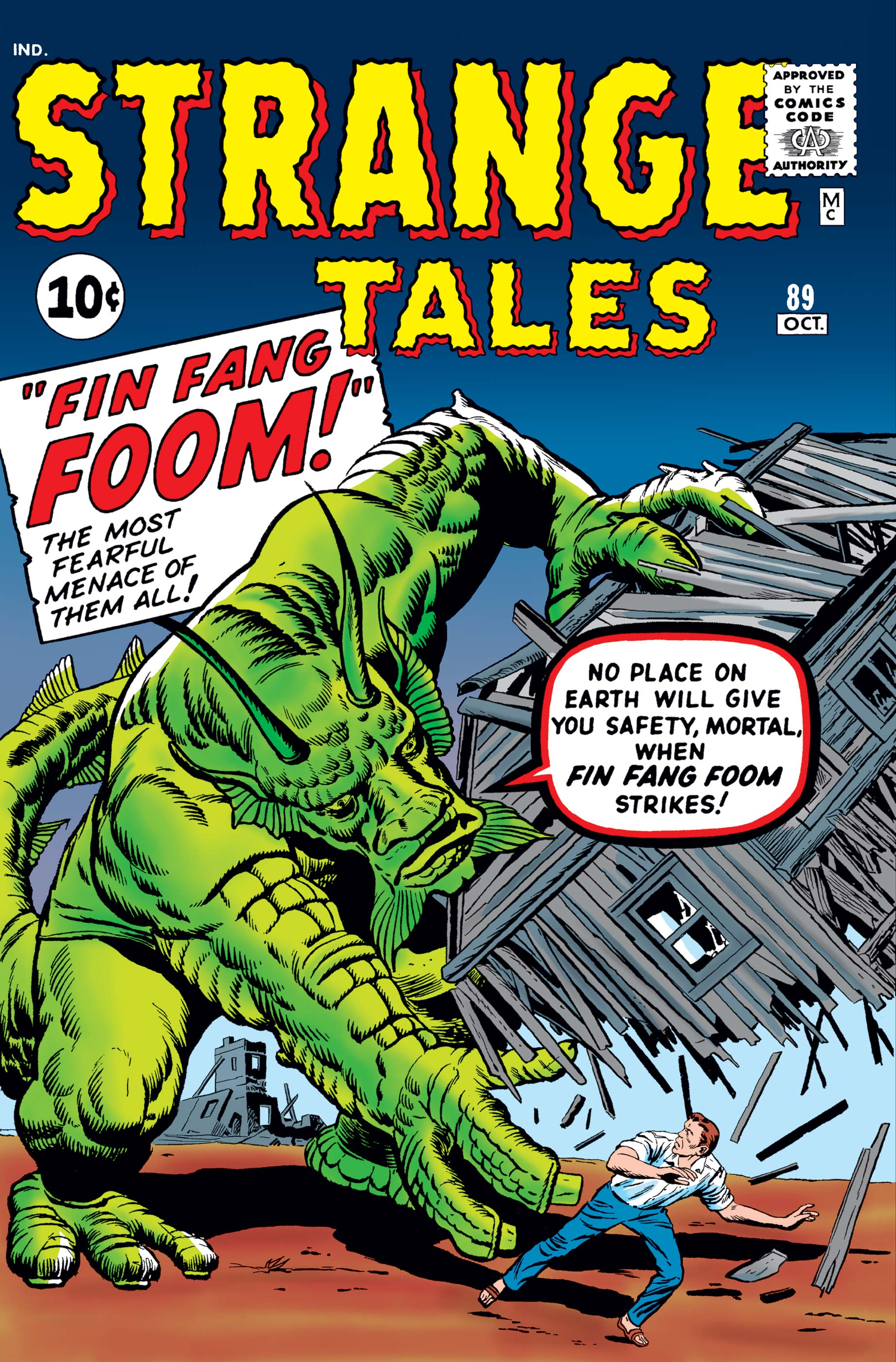
Fin Fang Foom on the cover of Strange Tales #89, pencils by Kirby

Several months later, after his split with DC, Kirby began freelancing regularly for Atlas despite harboring negative sentiments about Stan Lee (the cousin of Timely publisher Martin Goodman's wife), whom Kirby had always found annoying on top of his aforementioned betrayal he suspected in the 1940s. Because of the poor page rates, Kirby would spend 12 to 14 hours daily at his drawing table at home, producing four to five pages of artwork a day. His first published work at Atlas was the cover of and the seven-page story "I Discovered the Secret of the Flying Saucers" in Strange Worlds #1 (Dec. 1958). Initially with Christopher Rule as his regular inker, and later Dick Ayers, Kirby drew across all genres, from romance comics to war comics to crime comics to Western comics, but made his mark primarily with a series of supernatural-fantasy and science fiction stories featuring giant, drive-in movie-style monsters with names like Groot, the Thing from Planet X; Grottu, King of the Insects; and Fin Fang Foom for the company's many anthology series, such as Amazing Adventures, Strange Tales, Tales to Astonish, Tales of Suspense, and World of Fantasy. His bizarre designs of powerful, unearthly creatures proved a hit with readers. Additionally, he freelanced for Archie Comics around this time, reuniting briefly with Joe Simon to help develop the series The Fly and The Double Life of Private Strong. Additionally, Kirby drew some issues of Classics Illustrated.

At Marvel Kirby hit his stride once again in superhero comics, beginning with The Fantastic Four #1 (Nov. 1961), which some have observed, shares many elements of Kirby's Challengers of the Unknown. The landmark series became a hit that revolutionized the industry with its comparative naturalism and, eventually, a cosmic purview informed by Kirby's seemingly boundless imagination—one well-matched with the consciousness-expanding youth culture of the 1960s. For almost a decade, Kirby provided Marvel's house style, creating many of the Marvel characters and designing their visual motifs. At the editor-in-chief's request, he often provided new-to-Marvel artists "breakdown" layouts, over which they would pencil in order to become acquainted with the Marvel style of story-telling. As artist Gil Kane described:

Jack was the single most influential figure in the turnaround in Marvel's fortunes from the time he rejoined the company ... It wasn't merely that Jack conceived most of the characters that are being done, but ... Jack's point of view and philosophy of drawing became the governing philosophy of the entire publishing company and, beyond the publishing company, of the entire field ... [Marvel took] Jack and use[d] him as a primer. They would get artists ... and they taught them the ABCs, which amounted to learning Jack Kirby ... Jack was like the Holy Scripture and they simply had to follow him without deviation. That's what was told to me ... It was how they taught everyone to reconcile all those opposing attitudes to one single master point of view.

Highlights of Kirby's tenure also include the Hulk, Thor, the X-Men and Magneto, Doctor Doom, Uatu the Watcher, Ego the Living Planet, the Inhumans and their hidden city of Attilan, and the Black Panther (comics' first black superhero) and his Afrofuturist nation, Wakanda. Kirby initially was assigned to pencil the first Spider-Man story, but when he showed Lee the first six pages, Lee recalled, "I hated the way he was doing it! Not that he did it badly—it just wasn't the character I wanted; it was too heroic". Lee then turned to Steve Ditko to draw the story that would appear in Amazing Fantasy #15, for which Kirby nonetheless penciled the cover. Lee and Kirby gathered several of their newly created characters together into the team title The Avengers and brought back old characters from the 1940s such as the Sub-Mariner and Captain America. In later years, Lee and Kirby disputed over who deserved credit for such creations as The Fantastic Four.

Fantastic Four #72 (March 1968). Cover art by Kirby and Joe Sinnott, illustrating Kirby Krackle

The story frequently cited as Lee and Kirby's finest achievement is "The Galactus Trilogy" in Fantastic Four #48–50 (March–May 1966), chronicling the arrival of Galactus, a cosmic giant who wanted to devour the planet, and his herald, the Silver Surfer. Fantastic Four #48 was chosen as #24 in the 100 Greatest Marvels of All Time poll of Marvel's readers in 2001. Editor Robert Greenberger wrote in his introduction to the story that "As the fourth year of the Fantastic Four came to a close, Stan Lee and Jack Kirby seemed to be only warming up. In retrospect, it was perhaps the most fertile period of any monthly title during the Marvel Age." Comics historian Les Daniels noted that "[t]he mystical and metaphysical elements that took over the saga were perfectly suited to the tastes of young readers in the 1960s", and Lee soon discovered that the story was a favorite on college campuses. Kirby continued to expand the medium's boundaries, devising photo-collage covers and interiors, developing new drawing techniques such as the method for depicting energy fields now known as "Kirby Krackle", and other experiments.

In 1968 and 1969, Joe Simon was involved in litigation with Marvel Comics over the ownership of Captain America, initiated by Marvel after Simon registered the copyright renewal for Captain America in his own name. According to Simon, Kirby agreed to support the company in the litigation and, as part of a deal Kirby made with publisher Martin Goodman, signed over to Marvel any rights he might have had to the character.

At the same time, Kirby grew increasingly dissatisfied with working at Marvel, for reasons Kirby biographer Mark Evanier has suggested include resentment over Lee's media prominence, a lack of full creative control, anger over breaches of perceived promises by publisher Martin Goodman, and frustration over Marvel's failure to credit him specifically for his story plotting and for his character creations and co-creations. He began to both write and draw some secondary features for Marvel, such as "The Inhumans" in Amazing Adventures volume two, as well as horror stories for the anthology title Chamber of Darkness, and received full credit for doing so; but in 1970, Kirby was presented with a contract that included unfavorable terms such as a prohibition against legal retaliation. When Kirby objected, the management refused to negotiate any contract changes, bluntly dismissing his contribution to Marvel's success since they considered Lee solely responsible. Kirby, although he was earning $35,000 a year freelancing for the company (adjusted for inflation it was the equivalent of over $271,000 in 2024), then left Marvel in 1970 for rival DC Comics, under editorial director Carmine Infantino.

=== DC Comics and the Fourth World saga (1971–1975) ===
The New Gods #1 (March 1971) Cover art by Kirby and Don Heck.

Kirby spent nearly two years negotiating a deal to move to DC Comics, where in late 1970 he signed a three-year contract with an option for two additional years. He produced a series of interlinked titles under the blanket sobriquet "The Fourth World", which included a trilogy of new titles—New Gods, Mister Miracle, and The Forever People—as well as the extant Superman's Pal Jimmy Olsen. Kirby picked the latter book because the series was without a stable creative team and he did not want to cost anyone a job. Kirby was editor, writer and artist on each of these series.

The three books Kirby originated dealt with aspects of mythology he had previously touched upon in Thor. The New Gods would establish this new mythos, while in The Forever People Kirby would attempt to mythologize the lives of the young people he observed around him. The third book, Mister Miracle was more of a personal myth. The title character was an escape artist, which Mark Evanier suggests Kirby channeled his feelings of constraint into, although others have pointed out that it may have been based on comic book artist and escape artist Jim Steranko. Mister Miracle's wife was based in character on Kirby's wife Roz, and he even caricatured Stan Lee within the pages of the book as Funky Flashman, a depiction Lee found hurtful while Kirby tried to downplay the insult when confronted about it by Lee's protege, Roy Thomas, who was similarly insulted with Flashman's sidekick, Houseroy.

The central villain of the Fourth World series, Darkseid, and some of the Fourth World concepts, appeared in Jimmy Olsen before the launch of the other Fourth World books, giving the new titles greater exposure to potential buyers. The Superman figures and Jimmy Olsen faces drawn by Kirby were redrawn by Al Plastino, and later by Murphy Anderson. Les Daniels observed in 1995 that "Kirby's mix of slang and myth, science fiction and the Bible, made for a heady brew, but the scope of his vision has endured." In 2007, comics writer Grant Morrison commented that "Kirby's dramas were staged across Jungian vistas of raw symbol and storm ... The Fourth World saga crackles with the voltage of Jack Kirby's boundless imagination let loose onto paper."

In addition to his artistic efforts, Kirby proposed a variety of new formats for comics such as planning to collect his published Fourth World stories into square-bound books, a format that would later be called the trade paperback, which would eventually become standard practice in the industry. However, Infantino and company were not receptive and Kirby's proposals only went as far as producing the one-shot black-and-white magazines Spirit World and In the Days of the Mob in 1971, edited, written and drawn by Kirby.

Kirby later produced other DC series including OMAC, Kamandi, The Demon, and Kobra as well as working on such extant features as "The Losers" in Our Fighting Forces. Together with former partner Joe Simon for one last time, he worked on a new incarnation of the Sandman. Kirby produced three issues of the 1st Issue Special anthology series and created Atlas the Great, a new Manhunter, and the Dingbats of Danger Street.

Kirby's production assistant of the time, Mark Evanier, recounted that DC's policies of the era were not in sync with Kirby's creative impulses. Also Evanier said that he was often forced to work on characters and projects which he did not like. Meanwhile, some artists at DC did not want Kirby there, as he threatened their positions in the company; they also had bad blood from previous competition with Marvel and legal problems with him. Since he was working from California, they were able to undermine his work through redesigns in the New York office.

=== Return to Marvel (1976–1978) ===
At the comic book convention Marvelcon '75, in 1975, Stan Lee used a Fantastic Four panel discussion to announce that Kirby was returning to Marvel after having left in 1970 to work for DC Comics. Lee wrote in his monthly column, "Stan Lee's Soapbox", "I mentioned that I had a special announcement to make. As I started telling about Jack's return, to a totally incredulous audience, everyone's head started to snap around as Kirby himself came waltzin' down the aisle to join us on the rostrum! You can imagine how it felt clownin' around with the co-creator of most of Marvel's greatest strips once more."

Back at Marvel, Kirby both wrote and drew the monthly Captain America series as well as the Captain America's Bicentennial Battles one-shot in the oversized treasury format. He created the series The Eternals, which featured a race of inscrutable alien giants, the Celestials, whose behind-the-scenes intervention in primordial humanity would eventually become a core element of Marvel Universe continuity. He produced an adaptation and expansion of the film 2001: A Space Odyssey, as well as an abortive attempt to do the same for the classic television series The Prisoner. He wrote and drew Black Panther and drew numerous covers across the line.

Kirby's other Marvel creations in this period include Machine Man and Devil Dinosaur. Kirby's final comics collaboration with Stan Lee, The Silver Surfer: The Ultimate Cosmic Experience, was published in 1978 as part of the Marvel Fireside Books series and is considered Marvel's first graphic novel.

=== Film and animation (1979–1980) ===
Still dissatisfied with Marvel's treatment of him, and with an offer of employment from Hanna-Barbera, a job located in nearby Hollywood, Kirby left Marvel to work in animation. In that field for Ruby-Spears Productions he did designs for Turbo Teen, Thundarr the Barbarian and other animated series for television. In addition to a superior pay to his comics work, Kirby enjoyed excellent relations with the staff, especially with the younger artists who typically credited him as their inspiration. He worked on The New Fantastic Four animated series, reuniting him with scriptwriter Stan Lee and they kept their relations sufficiently cordial on a professional level. He illustrated an adaptation of the Walt Disney movie The Black Hole for Walt Disney's Treasury of Classic Tales syndicated comic strip in 1979–80.

In 1979, Kirby drew concept art for film producer Barry Geller's script treatment adapting Roger Zelazny's science fiction novel, Lord of Light, for which Geller had purchased the rights. In collaboration, Geller commissioned Kirby to draw set designs that would be used as architectural renderings for a Colorado theme park to be called Science Fiction Land; Geller announced his plans at a November press conference attended by Kirby, former American football star Rosey Grier, writer Ray Bradbury, and others. While the film did not come to fruition, Kirby's drawings were used for the CIA's "Canadian Caper", in which some members of the U.S. embassy in Tehran, Iran, who had avoided capture in the Iran hostage crisis, were able to escape the country posing as members of a movie location-scouting crew.

=== Final years (1981–1994) ===
Topps Comics' Bombast #1 (April 1993). Cover art by Kirby.

In the early 1980s, Kirby and Pacific Comics, a new, non-newsstand comic-book publisher, made one of the industry's earliest deals for creator-owned series, resulting in Captain Victory and the Galactic Rangers, and the six-issue miniseries Silver Star (later collected in hardcover format in 2007). This, together with similar actions by other independent comics publishers as Eclipse Comics (where Kirby co-created the character Destroyer Duck in a benefit comic-book series published to help Steve Gerber fight a legal case against Marvel), helped establish a precedent to end the monopoly of the work-for-hire system, wherein comics creators, even freelancers, had owned no rights to characters they created.

In 1983 Richard Kyle commissioned Kirby to create a 10-page autobiographical strip, "Street Code", which became one of the last works published in Kirby's lifetime. It was published in 1990, in the second issue of Kyle's revival of Argosy. Kirby continued to do periodic work for DC Comics during the 1980s, including a brief revival of his "Fourth World" saga in the 1984 and 1985 Super Powers miniseries and the 1985 graphic novel The Hunger Dogs. DC executives Jenette Kahn and Paul Levitz had Kirby re-design the Fourth World characters for the Super Powers toyline as a way of entitling him to royalties for several of his DC creations. In 1985, Kirby and Gil Kane helped to create the concept and designs for the Ruby-Spears animated television series The Centurions. A comic-book series based on the show was published by DC and a toy line produced by Kenner.

In the twilight of his life, Kirby spent a great deal of time sparring with Marvel executives over the ownership rights of his original page boards. At Marvel, many of these pages owned by the company (due to outdated and legally dubious copyright claims) were given away as promotional gifts to Marvel clients or simply stolen from company warehouses. After the passage of the Copyright Act of 1976, which greatly expanded artist copyright capabilities, comics publishers began to return original art to creators, but in Marvel's case only if they signed a release reaffirming Marvel's ownership of the copyright. In 1985, Marvel issued a release that demanded Kirby affirm that his art was created for hire, allowing Marvel to retain copyright in perpetuity, in addition to demanding that Kirby forego all future royalties. Marvel offered him 88 pages of his art (less than 1% of his total output) if he signed the agreement, but reserved the right to reclaim the art if Kirby violated the deal. After Kirby publicly slammed Marvel, calling the company thugs and claiming they were arbitrarily holding his creations, Marvel finally returned (after two years of deliberations) approximately 1,900 or 2,100 pages of the estimated 10,000 to 13,000 Kirby drew for the company.

For the producer Charles Band, Jack Kirby made concept art for the films Doctor Mortalis and Mindmaster, which were later released as Doctor Mordrid (1992) and Mandroid (1993), respectively. Doctor Mordrid began as a planned adaptation of the Marvel Comics character Dr. Strange, but Band's option expired.

For Topps Comics, founded in 1993, Kirby retained ownership of characters used in multiple series of what the company dubbed "The Kirbyverse". These titles were derived mainly from designs and concepts Kirby had kept in his files, some intended initially for the by-then-defunct Pacific Comics, and then licensed to Topps for what became the "Jack Kirby's Secret City Saga" mythos. Phantom Force was the last comic book Kirby worked on before his death. The story was co-written by Kirby with Michael Thibodeaux and Richard French, based on an eight-page pitch for an unused Bruce Lee comic in 1978. Issues #1 and 2 were published by Image Comics with various Image artists inking over Kirby's pencils. Issue #0 and issues #3–8 were published by Genesis West, with Kirby providing pencils for issues #0 and 4. Thibodeaux provided the art for the remaining issues of the series after Kirby died.

== Personal life and death ==
In the early 1940s, Kirby and his family moved to Brooklyn. Kirby met Rosalind "Roz" Goldstein, who lived in the same Brooklyn apartment building. The pair began dating soon afterward. Kirby proposed to Goldstein on her 18th birthday, and the two became engaged. They married on May 23, 1942. The couple had four children: Susan (b. December 6, 1945), Neal (b. May 1948), Barbara (b. November 1952), and Lisa (b. September 1960).

After being drafted into the U.S. Army and serving in the European Theater in World War II, Kirby corresponded with his wife regularly by v-mail, with Roz sending daily letters while she worked in a lingerie shop and lived with her mother at 2820 Brighton 7th Street in Brooklyn. During the winter of 1944, Kirby suffered severe frostbite and was taken to a hospital in London for recovery. Doctors considered amputating Kirby's legs, which had turned black, but he eventually recovered and was able to walk again. He returned to the United States in January 1945, assigned to Camp Butner in North Carolina, where he spent the last six months of his service as part of the motor pool. Kirby was honorably discharged as a private first class on July 20, 1945, having received a Combat Infantryman Badge, a European/African/Middle Eastern Campaign Medal with a bronze Battle Star.

In 1949, Kirby bought a house for his family in East Williston, New York, on Long Island. It was the family's home for the next 20 years; Kirby worked out of a basement studio just 10 feet (3.0 m) wide, which the family referred to jocularly as "The Dungeon". He moved the family to Southern California in early 1969, both to live in a drier climate for the sake of daughter Lisa's health and to be closer to the Hollywood studios Jack Kirby believed might provide work.

In an interview, Kirby's granddaughter Jillian Kirby said Jack Kirby was a "liberal Democrat". Jack Kirby held anti-communist views, once saying that "I was against the reds. I became a witch hunter. My enemies were the commies—I called them commies. In fact, Granny Goodness was a commie, Doubleheader was a commie."

On February 6, 1994, aged 76, Kirby died of heart failure in his Thousand Oaks, California home. He was buried at Valley Oaks Memorial Park in Westlake Village, California.

== Artistic style and achievements ==
Brent Staples wrote in the New York Times:

He created a new grammar of storytelling and a cinematic style of motion. Once-wooden characters cascaded from one frame to another—or even from page to page—threatening to fall right out of the book into the reader's lap. The force of punches thrown was visibly and explosively evident. Even at rest, a Kirby character pulsed with tension and energy in a way that makes movie versions of the same characters seem static by comparison.

Jack Kirby has been referred to as the "superhero of style", his artwork described by John Carlin in Masters of American Comics as "deliberately primitive and bombastic", and elsewhere has been compared to Cubist, Futurist, Primitivist and outsider art. His contributions to the comic book form, including the many characters he created or co-created and the many genres he worked on have led to him being referred to as the definitive comic book artist. Given the number of places Kirby's artwork can now be found, the toys based on his designs, and the success of the movies based upon his work, Charles Hatfield and Ben Saunders said he was "one of the chief architects of the American imagination." He was regarded as a hard working artist, and it has been calculated that he drew at least 20,318 pages of published art and a further 1,385 covers in his career. He published 1,158 pages in 1962 alone. Kirby defined comics in two periods: his work in the early 1940s with Joe Simon on the Captain America strip, and then his superhero comics of the 1960s and early 1970s, first with Stan Lee at Marvel Comics and then on his own at DC Comics. Kirby also created stories in almost every genre of comics, from the autobiographical Street Code to the apocalyptic science fiction fantasy of Kamandi.

=== Narrative approach to comics ===
Like many of his contemporaries, Kirby was hugely indebted to Milton Caniff, Hal Foster, and Alex Raymond who codified many of the tropes of narrative art in adventure comic strips. It has also been suggested that Kirby drew from Burne Hogarth, whose dynamic figure work may have informed the way Kirby drew figures; "his ferocious bounding, and grotesquely articulated figures seem directly descended from Hogarth's dynamically contorted forms." His style drew on these influences, all major artists at the time Kirby was learning his craft, with Caniff, Foster and Raymond between them imparting to the sequential adventure comic strip a highly illustrative approach based on realizing the setting to a very high degree. Where Kirby diverged from these influences, and where his style impacted on the formation of comic book art, was in his move away from an illustrated approach to one that was more dynamic. Kirby's artistic style was one that captured energy and motion within the image, synergizing with the text and helping to serve the narrative. In contrast, successors to the illustrative approach, such as Gil Kane, found their work eventually reach an impasse. The art would illustrate, but in lacking movement caused the reader to contemplate the art as much as the written word. Later artists such as Bryan Hitch and Alex Ross combined the Kirby and Kane approaches, using highly realistic backgrounds contrasted with dynamic characters to create what became known as a widescreen approach to comics.

Kirby's dynamism and energy served to push the reader through the story where an illustrative, detailed approach would cause the eye to linger. His reduction of the presentation of a given scene down to one that represents the semblance of movement has led Kirby to be described as cinematic in his style. Kirby had worked at Fleischer Studios before coming to comics and had a grounding in animation techniques for producing motion. He also realized that comic books were not subject to the same constraints as the newspaper strip. While other comic book artists recreated the layouts that format used, Kirby swiftly utilized the space a whole comic book page created. As Ron Goulart describes, "(h)e broke up the pages in new ways and introduced splash panels that stretched across two pages." Kirby himself described the creation of his dynamic style as a reaction both to the cinema and to the urge to create and compete: "I found myself competing with the movie camera. I had to compete with the camera. I felt like John Henry... I tore my characters out of the panels. I made them jump all over the page. I tried to make that cohesive so that it would be easier to read... I had to get my characters in extreme positions, and in doing so I created an extreme style which was recognizable by everybody."

=== Style ===
Fantastic Four #51 (June 1966) p. 14; collage and pencilled figure by Jack Kirby, inks by Joe Sinnott, letters by Artie Simek, dialogue by Stan Lee, illustrating Kirby's use of collage

In the early 1940s Kirby at times disregarded panel borders. A character was drawn in one panel, but their shoulder and arm would extend outside the border, into the gutter and sometimes on top of a nearby panel. A character may be punched out of one panel, feet being in the original panel and body in the next. Panels themselves would overlap, and Kirby found new ways to arrange panels on a comic book page. His figures were depicted as lithe and graceful, although Kirby would place them thrusting from the page towards the reader. In the late 1940s and 1950s Kirby moved away from superhero comics and with Joe Simon worked in a number of genres. Kirby and Simon created the romance comics genre, and working in this as well as the war, Western and crime genres saw Kirby's style change. He left behind the diverse panel framing and layouts. The nature of the genres enabled him to channel the energy into the posing and blocking of characters, forcing the drama into the constraints of the panel.

When Kirby and Stan Lee came together at Marvel Comics, his art developed again. His characters and representations became more abstract, less anatomically correct. He placed figures across three planes of a panel's depth to suggest three dimensions. His backgrounds were less detailed where he did not want the eye to be drawn. His figures moved actively along diagonals and he utilized foreshortening to make a character appear to recede more deeply into the panel, so that they appeared to move towards the reader off the page. During the 1960s Kirby also developed a talent for creating collages, initially utilizing them within the pages of The Fantastic Four. He introduced the Negative Zone as a place within the Marvel Universe that would only be illustrated via collage. However, the reproduction within the published comics of the collages, coupled with the low page rate he was being paid and the time they took to develop saw their use discarded. Kirby would later return to the use of collage in his Fourth World work at DC Comics. Here he used them most often in the pages of Superman's Pal, Jimmy Olsen.

Kirby's style in the late 1960s was regarded so highly by Stan Lee that he instituted it as Marvel's house style. Lee would instruct other artists to draw more like Jack, and would also assign them books to work on using Kirby's breakdowns of the story so that they could more closely hew to Kirby's style. Over time, Kirby's style has become so well known that imitations, homages and pastiche are referred to as Kirbyesque.

Kirby Krackle, also referred to as Kirby Dots, is Kirby's artistic convention of depicting the effect of energy. Within the drawing, a field of black, pseudo-fractal images is used to represent negative space around unspecified kinds of energy. Kirby Krackles are typically used in illustrations of explosions, smoke, the blasts from ray guns, "cosmic" energy, and outer space phenomena. The advanced technology Kirby drew, from the Afrofuturistic state of Wakanda through the Mother Boxes of the New Gods to the spaceships and design of the Celestials is gathered together under the collective term "Kirby Tech". John Paul Leon has described it as "It's tech; it's mechanical even if it's alien, but it's drawn in such an organic way that you don't question it. It's just an extension of his world. I'm not sure who else you could say did that." Kirby's depiction of technology is linked by Charles Hatfield to Leo Marx's idea of the technological sublime, specifically utilizing Edmund Burke's definition of the Sublime. Using this definition, Kirby's view and depiction of technology is that of it as something to be feared.

=== Working method ===
Jack Kirby's detailed pencils for the splash page to The Demon #1 DC Comics (September 1972)

Unlike many of his contemporaries, Kirby did not use preliminary sketches, rough work or layouts. He would instead start with the blank board and draw the story onto the page from top to bottom, start to finish. Many artists, including Carmine Infantino, Gil Kane and Jim Steranko have remarked on the unusual nature of his method. Kirby would rarely erase while working; the art, and therefore the story, would flow from him almost fully formed. Kirby's pencils had a reputation for being detailed, to the point that they were difficult to ink. Will Eisner remembers even in the early years that Kirby's pencils were "tight". Working for Eisner, Kirby initially inked with a pen, not confident enough in his ability to use the Japanese brushes Lou Fine and Eisner preferred. By the time Kirby worked with Joe Simon, Kirby had taught himself to use a brush, and would on occasion ink over inked work where he felt it was needed.

Due to the amount of work Kirby produced, it was rare for him to ink his own work. Instead the pencilled pages were sent on to an inker; different inkers left their own stylistic stamp on the published version. As Kirby noted, individual inkers were suited to different genres. Harry Mendryk has suggested that for a period in the 1950s, Kirby inked himself due to other work drying up. By the late 1960s, Kirby preferred to pencil, feeling that "inking in itself is a separate kind of art." Stan Lee recalls Kirby not really being too interested in who inked him: "I cared much more about who inked Kirby than Kirby did... Kirby never seemed to care who inked him... I think Kirby felt his style was so strong that it just didn't matter who inked him". Chic Stone, an inker of Kirby's during the 1960s at Marvel, recalled "(T)he two best [inkers] for Jack were Mike Royer and Steve Rude. Both truly maintained the integrity of Jack's pencils."

The size of the art board made a difference to Kirby's style. During the late 1960s the industry shrunk the size of the art board artists used. Prior to 1967, art boards were around 14 x 21 inches, being reproduced at 7 x 10 inches. After 1967 the size of the board shrunk to 10 x 15. This affected the way Kirby drew. Gil Kane noted that "the amount of space around the figures became less and less... The figures became bigger and bigger, and they couldn't be contained by a single panel or even a single page". Professor Craig Fischer asserts Kirby at first "hated" the new size. Fischer argues that it took Kirby around 18 months to negotiate a way of working at the smaller size. Initially he retreated to a less detailed, close up style, as seen in Fantastic Four #68. In adjusting to the new size, Kirby began utilizing depth to bring the pages to life, increasing his use of foreshortening. By the time Kirby had moved to DC, he started to incorporate the use of two-page spreads into his art more. These spreads helped define the mood of the story, and came to define Kirby's late era work.

=== Exhibitions and original art ===
Kirby's art has been exhibited as part of the Masters of American Comics joint exhibition by the Hammer Museum and Museum of Contemporary Art, Los Angeles from November 2005 to March 2006. In 2015 Charles Hatfield curated the "Comic Book Apocalypse" exhibition at the California State University, Northridge Art Galleries. The exhibition focused on Kirby's work from 1965 onward. In 2018 "A Jack Kirby Odyssey" was organized by Tom Kraft. The exhibition displayed photocopies of unpublished Kirby pencils for stories intended for publication in the 2001: A Space Odyssey comic book adaptation series as well as reproductions of the published work. In 1994 The Cartoon Art Trust organized an exhibition in London of Kirby art, "Jack Kirby: The King of Comic Books", in the wake of Kirby's death. In 2010 Dan Nadel and Paul Gravett curated "Jack Kirby: The House That Jack Built", a retrospective of Kirby's career from 1942 to 1985. The exhibition was part of the Fumetto International Comics Festival held in Lucerne, Switzerland.

Kirby's original art regularly sells at auction, with Heritage Auctions listing the cover of Tales of Suspense #84, inked by Frank Giacoia as realizing a price of $167,300 in a February 2014 auction. A large portion of Kirby's art remains unaccounted for. Work created around World War II would have been reused or pulped due to paper shortages. DC Comics had a policy of destroying original art in the 1950s. Marvel Comics also destroyed art until 1960, when it stored artwork prior to a policy which had art returned to the artist. In Kirby's case, it is reported that about 2,100 pieces of the estimated 10,000 pages drawn were returned to him. The whereabouts of the missing pages are unknown, although some do turn up for sale, provenance unknown.

== Kirby's estate ==
=== Subsequent releases ===
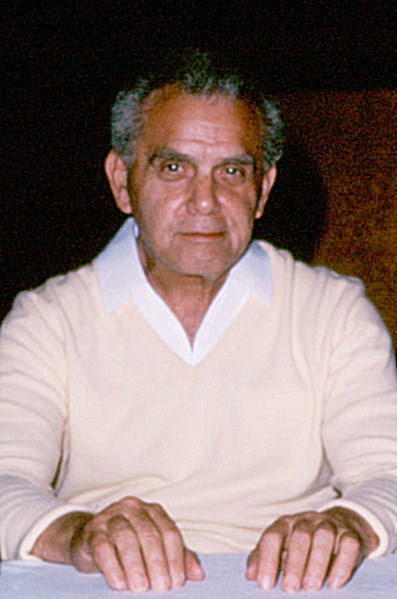
Kirby in the 1980s

Lisa Kirby announced in early 2006 that she and co-writer Steve Robertson, with artist Mike Thibodeaux, planned to publish via the Marvel Comics Icon imprint a six-issue limited series, Jack Kirby's Galactic Bounty Hunters, featuring characters and concepts created by her father for Captain Victory. The series, scripted by Lisa Kirby, Robertson, Thibodeaux, and Richard French, with pencil art by Jack Kirby and Thibodeaux, and inking by Scott Hanna and Karl Kesel primarily, ran an initial five issues (Sept. 2006–Jan. 2007) and then a later final issue (Sept. 2007).

Marvel posthumously published a "lost" Kirby/Lee Fantastic Four story, Fantastic Four: The Lost Adventure (April 2008), with unused pages Kirby had originally drawn for a story that was partially published in Fantastic Four #108 (March 1971).

In 2011, Dynamite Entertainment published Kirby: Genesis, an eight-issue miniseries by writer Kurt Busiek and artists Jack Herbert and Alex Ross, featuring Kirby-owned characters previously published by Pacific Comics and Topps Comics.

=== Copyright dispute ===
On September 16, 2009, Kirby's four children served notices of termination to The Walt Disney Studios, 20th Century Fox, Universal Pictures, Paramount Pictures, and Sony Pictures to attempt to gain control of various Silver Age Marvel characters. Marvel sought to invalidate those claims. In mid-March 2010 Kirby's children "sued Marvel to terminate copyrights and gain profits from [Kirby's] comic creations". In July 2011, the United States District Court for the Southern District of New York issued a summary judgment in favor of Marvel, which was affirmed in August 2013 by the United States Court of Appeals for the Second Circuit. The Kirby children filed a petition on March 21, 2014, for a review of the case by the Supreme Court of the United States, but a settlement was reached on September 26, 2014, and the family requested that the petition be dismissed. While the settlement has left uncertain the legal right to works governed by the Copyright Act of 1909 created before the Copyright Act of 1976 came into force, the Kirby children's attorney, Marc Toberoff, said (in 2014) that the issue of creators' rights to reclaim the work done as independent contractors remains, and other potential claims have yet to become ripe.

== Legacy ==
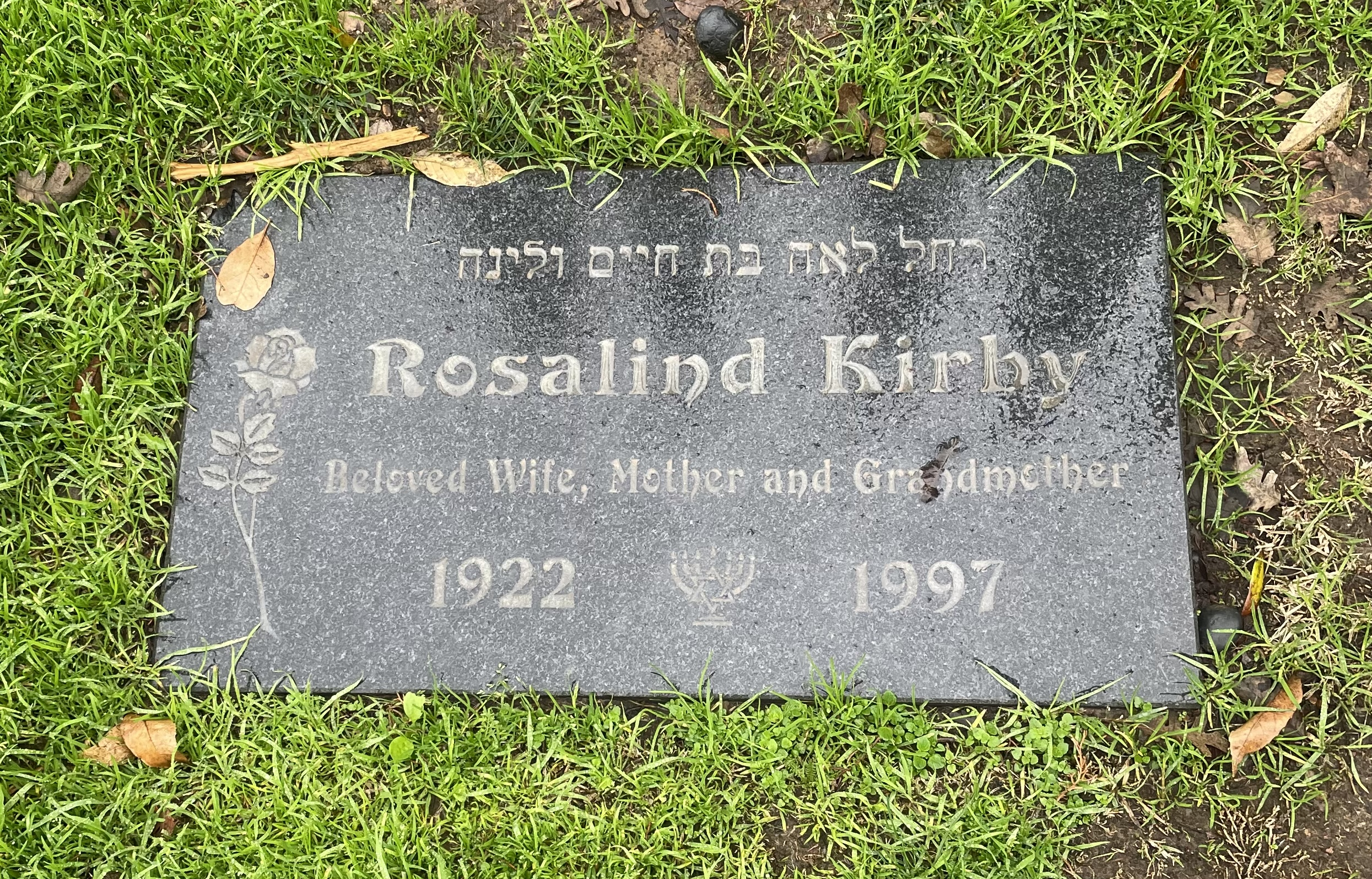
Gravestone of Rosalind "Roz" Kirby

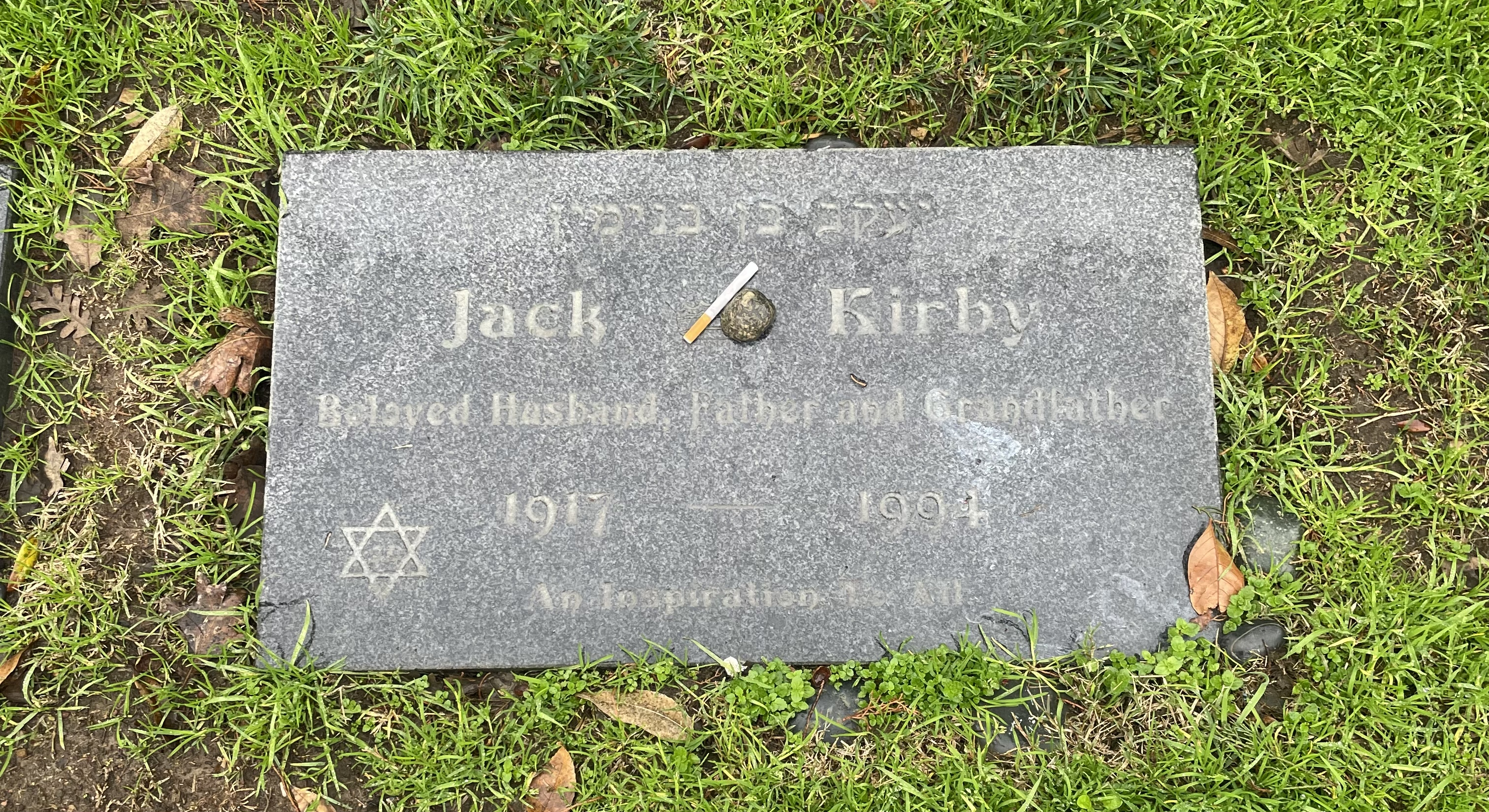
Gravestone of Jack Kirby

- Glen David Gold wrote in Masters of American Comics that, "Kirby elevates all of us into a realm where we fly among the beating wings of the immortal and the omnipotent, the gods and the monsters, so that we, dreamers all, can play host to the demons of creation, can become our own myths.
- Michael Chabon, in his afterword to his Pulitzer Prize-winning novel The Amazing Adventures of Kavalier & Clay, a fictional account of two early comics pioneers, wrote, "I want to acknowledge the deep debt I owe in this and everything else I've ever written to the work of the late Jack Kirby, the King of Comics."
- Director James Cameron said Kirby inspired the look of his film Aliens, calling it "not intentional in the sense I sat down and looked at all my favorite comics and studied them for this film, but, yeah, Kirby's work was definitely in my subconscious programming. The guy was a visionary. Absolutely. And he could draw machines like nobody's business. He was sort of like A. E. van Vogt and some of these other science-fiction writers who are able to create worlds that — even though we live in a science-fictionary world today — are still so far beyond what we're experiencing."
- Writer Marv Wolfman: "The imagination of Jack Kirby has no boundaries, no limits. ...When man eventually reaches the far end of the universe, he will undoubtedly find the name Jack Kirby signed on the lower right hand corner."
- Several Kirby images are among those on the "Marvel Super Heroes" set of commemorative stamps issued by the U.S. Postal Service on July 27, 2007. Ten of the stamps are portraits of individual Marvel characters and the other 10 stamps depict individual Marvel comic book covers. According to the credits printed on the back of the pane, Kirby's artwork is featured on: Captain America, The Thing, Silver Surfer, The Amazing Spider-Man #1, The Incredible Hulk #1, Captain America #100, The X-Men #1, and The Fantastic Four #3.
- In the 1990s Superman: The Animated Series television show, police detective Dan Turpin was modeled on Kirby.
- In the 1998 episode "The Demon Within" of The New Batman Adventures, Klarion has Etrigan break into the Kirby Cake Company. Both characters were created by Kirby.
- In 2002, jazz percussionist Gregg Bendian released a seven-track CD titled Requiem for Jack Kirby, inspired by Kirby's art and storytelling. Titles of the instrumental cuts include "Kirby's Fourth World", "New Gods", "The Mother Box", "Teaneck in the Marvel Age" and "Air Above Zenn-La".
- The Cartoon Network/Adult Swim series Minoriteam uses artwork as a homage to Jack Kirby (credited under Jack "The King" Kirby, who is credited under special thanks in the show's end credits).
- Various comic-book and cartoon creators have done homages to Kirby. Examples include the Teenage Mutant Ninja Turtles Mirage Comics series ("Kirby and the Warp Crystal" in Donatello #1, and its animated counterpart, "The King", from the 2003 cartoon series). The episode of Superman: The Animated Series entitled "Apokolips ... Now!, Part 2" was dedicated to his memory.
- As of June 2018, Hollywood films based on characters Kirby co-created have collectively earned nearly US$7.4 billion. Kirby himself is a character portrayed by Luis Yagüe in the 2009 Spanish short film The King & the Worst, which is inspired by Kirby's service in World War II. He is portrayed by Michael Parks in a brief appearance in the fact-based drama Argo (2012), about the Canadian Caper.
- A play based on Kirby's life, King Kirby, by Crystal Skillman and New York Times bestselling comics writer Fred Van Lente, was staged at Brooklyn's Brick Theater as part of its annual Comic Book Theater Festival. The play was a New York Times Critics' Pick selection and was funded by a widely publicized Kickstarter campaign.
- The 2016 novel I Hate the Internet frequently mentions Kirby as a "central personage" of the novel.
- To mark Jack Kirby's 100th birthday in 2017, DC Comics announced a series of one-shots involving characters that Kirby had created, including The Newsboy Legion and the Boy Commandos, Manhunter, Sandman, the New Gods, Darkseid, and ending with The Black Racer and Shilo Norman.
- In May 2004, in Fantastic Four issue #511 (written by Mark Waid and penciled by Mike Weiringo), Reed, Sue, and Johnny travel to Heaven to recover the soul of the deceased Ben Grimm. After passing a trial, they are allowed to meet God himself, who is depicted as Jack Kirby. God explains that he is seen by them as what he is to them, and that he considers the fact that they see him as Kirby to be an honor.
- Alan Moore delivers his tribute to Jack Kirby in his next-to-last issue of the Supreme series, Supreme #62 (The Return #6) "New Jack City" (March 2000), illustrated by Rob Liefeld and, for the Kirbyesque part, Rick Veitch. In this story Supreme enters a realm of pure ideas where he meets a gigantic floating Jack Kirby head, smoking a cigar. "This gigantic entity explains to him that he used to be a flesh and blood artist but now he is entirely in the realm of ideas, which is much better because flesh and blood has its limitations because he can only do four or five pages a day tops, where now he exists purely in the world of ideas".
- The Disney California Adventure attraction Guardians of the Galaxy – Mission: Breakout! is surrounded by markings on the ground that serve as a tribute to the Kirby Krackle.
- The 1995 video game Marvel Super Heroes was dedicated to Kirby.
- The 2025 Marvel movie The Fantastic Four: First Steps is set on Earth-828, which is derived from Kirby's birthday (August 28), and includes a quote in the end credits from Kirby about his presence in all of the stories he created.

== Filmography ==
- Kirby guest starred in the episode "Bounty Hunter" of Starsky & Hutch as a police officer.
- Kirby made an un-credited cameo appearance in the episode "No Escape" of The Incredible Hulk. He can be spotted in the hospital scene as a police sketch artist who is recreating, from the witness's description, a picture of the man he claimed to have saved his life. Instead of resembling the live-action Hulk, this illustration is instantly recognizable as the Hulk as he appeared in the original comics.
- Kirby appeared as himself in the episode "You Can't Win" of Bob.

== Awards and honors ==
Jack Kirby received a great deal of recognition over the course of his career, including the 1967 Alley Award for Best Pencil Artist. The following year he was runner-up behind Jim Steranko. His other Alley Awards were:

- 1963: Favorite Short Story – "The Human Torch Meets Captain America", by Stan Lee and Jack Kirby, Strange Tales #114
- 1964:
  - Best Novel – "Captain America Joins the Avengers", by Stan Lee and Jack Kirby, from The Avengers #4
  - Best New Strip or Book – "Captain America", by Stan Lee and Jack Kirby, in Tales of Suspense
- 1965: Best Short Story – "The Origin of the Red Skull", by Stan Lee and Jack Kirby, Tales of Suspense #66
- 1966: Best Professional Work, Regular Short Feature – "Tales of Asgard" by Stan Lee and Jack Kirby, in Thor
- 1967: Best Professional Work, Regular Short Feature – (tie) "Tales of Asgard" and "Tales of the Inhumans", both by Stan Lee and Jack Kirby, in Thor
- 1968:
  - Best Professional Work, Best Regular Short Feature – "Tales of the Inhumans", by Stan Lee and Jack Kirby, in Thor
  - Best Professional Work, Hall of Fame – Fantastic Four, by Stan Lee and Jack Kirby; Nick Fury, Agent of S.H.I.E.L.D., by Jim Steranko

Kirby won a Shazam Award for Special Achievement by an Individual in 1971 for his "Fourth World" series in Forever People, New Gods, Mister Miracle, and Superman's Pal Jimmy Olsen. He received an Inkpot Award in 1974 and was inducted into the Shazam Awards Hall of Fame in 1975. In 1987 he was an inaugural inductee into the Will Eisner Comic Book Hall of Fame. He received the 1993 Bob Clampett Humanitarian Award at that year's Eisner Awards.

His work was honored posthumously in 1998: The collection of his New Gods material, Jack Kirby's New Gods, edited by Bob Kahan, won both the Harvey Award for Best Domestic Reprint Project, and the Eisner Award for Best Archival Collection/Project. On July 14, 2017, Jack Kirby was named a Disney Legend for his part in the creation of numerous characters that would comprise Disney's Marvel Cinematic Universe.

The Jack Kirby Awards and Jack Kirby Hall of Fame were named in his honor. He was the posthumous recipient of the Bill Finger Award in 2017.

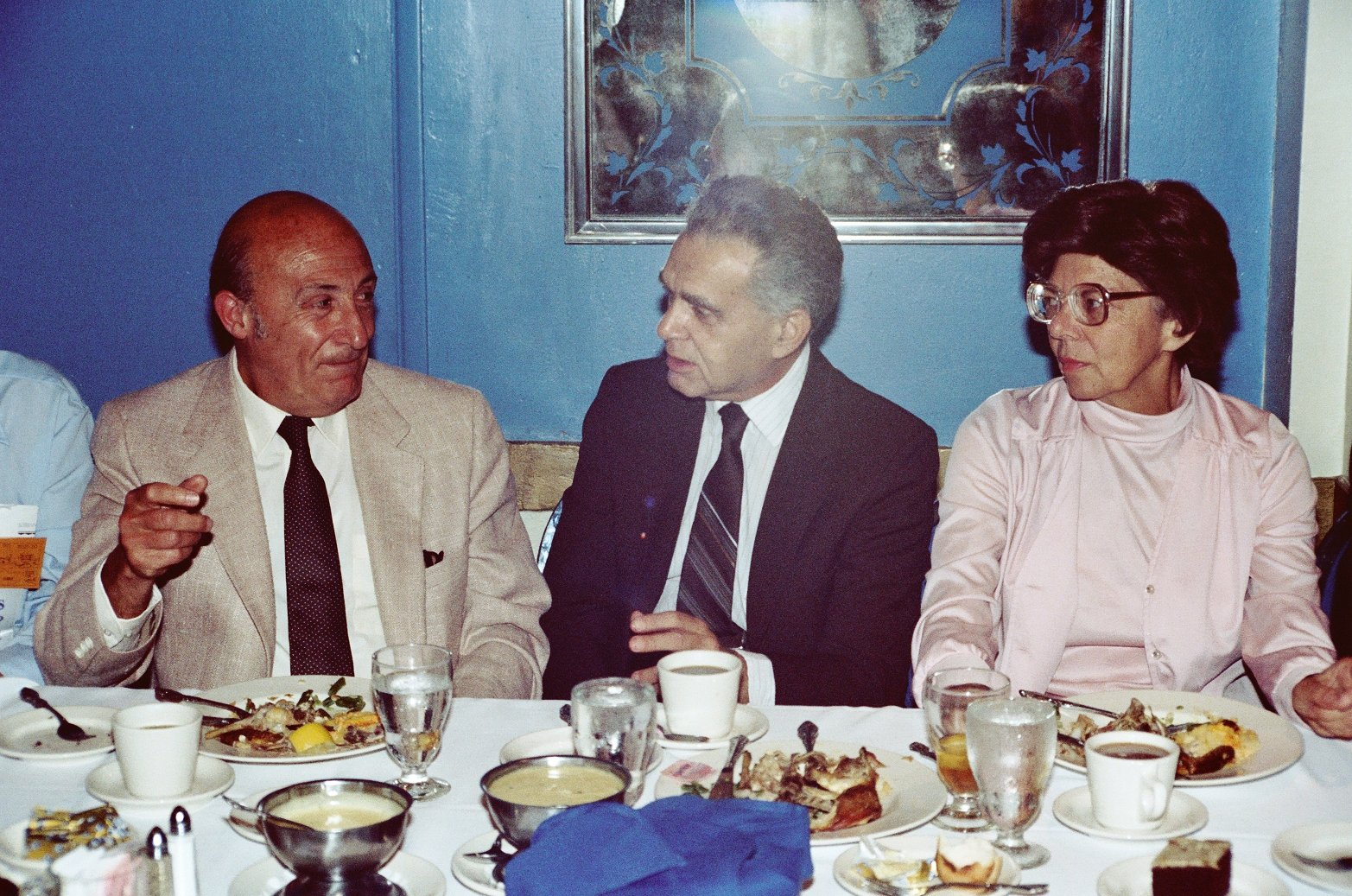
Will Eisner (left), Jack Kirby (middle), and Roz Kirby in 1982

With Will Eisner, Robert Crumb, Harvey Kurtzman, Gary Panter and Chris Ware, Kirby was among the artists honored in the exhibition "Masters of American Comics" at the Jewish Museum in New York City from September 16, 2006, to January 28, 2007.

Asteroid 51985 Kirby, discovered September 22, 2001, was named in his honor. A crater on Mercury, located near the north pole, was named in his honor in 2019.

== Bibliography ==
This is an abridged listing of Kirby's comics work (interior pencil art) for major comics publishers DC Comics and Marvel Comics. For his work at DC it lists any title Kirby worked on for eight or more issues between 1970 and 1976. Of his Marvel Comics work, it lists any title Kirby worked on for eight or more issues between 1959 and 1978.

=== DC Comics ===
- The Demon #1–16 (1972–1974)
- Forever People #1–11 (1971–1972)
- Kamandi: The Last Boy on Earth #1–40 (1972–1976)
- Mister Miracle #1–18 (1971–1974)
- New Gods #1–11 (1971–1972)
- O.M.A.C. #1–8 (1974–1975)
- Our Fighting Forces (The Losers) #151–162 (1974–1975)
- Superman's Pal Jimmy Olsen #133–139, 141–148 (1970–1972)

=== Marvel Comics ===
- Amazing Adventures #1–4 (Inhumans) (1970)
- Avengers #1–8 (full pencils), #14–17 (layouts only, pencils by Don Heck) (1963–1965)
- Black Panther #1–12 (1977–1978)
- Captain America #100–109, 112 (1968–1969); #193–214, Annual #3–4 (1976–1977)
- Devil Dinosaur #1–9 (1978)
- Eternals #1–19, Annual #1 (1976–1978)
- Fantastic Four #1–102, 108, Annual #1–6 (1961–1971)
- Incredible Hulk #1–5 (1962–1963)
- Journey into Mystery #51–52, 54–82 (1959–1962); (Thor): #83–89, 93, 97–125, Annual #1 (1962–1966)
- Machine Man #1–9 (1978)
- Silver Surfer #18 (1970)
- Strange Tales #67–70, 72–100 (1959–1962); (Human Torch): #101–105, 108–109, 114, 120, Annual #2 (1962–1964); (Nick Fury): #135, 141–142 (full pencils), 136–140, 143–153 (layouts only, pencils by John Severin, Jim Steranko and others) (1965–1967)
- Tales of Suspense #2–4, 7–35 (1959–1962); (Iron Man): #41, 43 (1963); (Captain America): #59–68, 78–86, 92–99 (full pencils), #69–75, 77 (layouts only) (1964–1968)
- Tales to Astonish #1, 5–34; (Ant-Man): #35–40, 44, 49–51 (1962–1964); (The Incredible Hulk): #68–72 (full pencils), #73–84 (layouts only, pencils by Bill Everett and others) (1965–1966); (Sub-Mariner): #82 (1966)
- Thor #126–177, 179, Annual #2 (1966–1970)
- 2001: A Space Odyssey #1–10 (1976–1977)
- X-Men #1–11 (full pencils) (1963–1965), #12–17 (layouts only, pencils by Alex Toth and Werner Roth) (1965–1966)
