= Joe Simon =

American comic book creator (1913–2011)

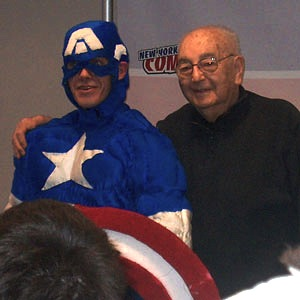
- Simon with a fan at the 2006 New York Comic Con
- Born: Hymie Simon; October 11, 1913 Rochester, New York, U.S.
- Died: December 14, 2011 (aged 98) New York City, U.S.
- Areas: Cartoonist, Writer, Penciller, Inker, Editor, Publisher, Letterer, Colourist
- Pseudonyms: Gregory Sykes; Jon Henri
- Notable works: Captain America, Fighting American, Sick, Young Romance, The Fly, Blue Bolt
- Collaborators: Jack Kirby
- Awards: Inkpot Award, 1998; Will Eisner Comic Book Hall of Fame, 1999; Inkwell Awards Joe Sinnott Hall of Fame (2014)
- Spouse: Harriet Feldman
- Children: 5

Joseph Henry Simon (born Hymie Simon; October 11, 1913 – December 14, 2011) was an American comic book writer, artist, editor, and publisher. Simon created or co-created many important characters in the 1930s–1940s Golden Age of Comic Books and served as the first editor of Timely Comics, the company that would evolve into Marvel Comics.

With his partner, artist Jack Kirby, he co-created Captain America, one of comics' most enduring superheroes, and the team worked extensively on such features at DC Comics as the 1940s Sandman and Sandy the Golden Boy, and co-created the Newsboy Legion, the Boy Commandos, and Manhunter. Simon and Kirby creations for other comics publishers include Boys' Ranch, Fighting American and the Fly. In the late 1940s, the duo created the field of romance comics, and were among the earliest pioneers of horror comics. Simon, who went on to work in advertising and commercial art, also founded the satirical magazine Sick in 1960, remaining with it for over a decade. He briefly published with DC Comics in the 1970s.

Simon was inducted into the Will Eisner Comic Book Hall of Fame in 1999.

== Early life ==
Joe Simon was born in 1913 as Hymie Simon and raised in Rochester, New York, the son of Harry Simon, who had emigrated from Leeds, England, in 1905, and Rose (Kurland), whom Harry met in the United States. Harry Simon moved to Rochester, then a clothing-manufacturing center where his younger brother Isaac lived, and the couple had a daughter, Beatrice, in 1912. A poor Jewish family, the Simons lived in "a first-floor flat which doubled as my father's tailor shop". Simon attended Benjamin Franklin High School, where he was art director for the school newspaper and the yearbook – earning his first professional fee as an artist when two universities each paid $10 publication rights for his art deco, tempera splash pages for the yearbook sections.

== Career ==
=== Beginnings ===
Upon graduation in 1932, Simon was hired by Rochester Journal-American art director Adolph Edler as an assistant, replacing Simon's future comics colleague Al Liederman, who had quit. Between production duties, he did occasional sports and editorial cartoons for the paper. Two years later, Simon took an art job at the Syracuse Herald in Syracuse, New York, for $45 a week, supplying sports and editorial cartoons there as well. Shortly thereafter, for $60 a week, he succeeded Liederman as art director of a paper whose name Simon recalled in his 1990 autobiography as the Syracuse Journal American, although the Syracuse Journal and the Syracuse Sunday American, were the separate weekday and Sunday papers, respectively. The paper soon closed, and Simon, at 23, ventured to New York City.

There, Simon took a room at the boarding house Haddon Hall, in the Morningside Heights neighborhood of Manhattan, near Columbia University. At the suggestion of the art director of the New York Journal American, he sought and found freelance work at Paramount Pictures, working above the Paramount Theatre on Broadway, retouching the movie studio's publicity photos. He also found freelance work at Macfadden Publications, doing illustrations for True Story and other magazines. Sometime afterward, his boss, art director Harlan Crandall, recommended Simon to Lloyd Jacquet, head of Funnies, Inc., one of that era's comic-book "packagers" that supplied comics content on demand to publishers testing the new medium. That day, Simon received his first comics assignment, a seven-page Western.

Four days later, Jacquet asked Simon, at the behest of Timely Comics publisher Martin Goodman, to create a flaming superhero like Timely's successful character the Human Torch. From this came Simon's first comic-book hero, the Fiery Mask. Simon used the pseudonym Gregory Sykes on at least one story during this time, "King of the Jungle", starring Trojak The Tiger Man, in Timely's Daring Mystery Comics #2 (Feb. 1940).

=== Simon and Kirby ===
1974 Comic Art Convention program, reprinting Simon's original 1940 sketch of Captain America.

During this time, Simon met Fox Feature Syndicate comics artist Jack Kirby, with whom he would soon have a storied collaboration lasting a decade-and-a-half. Speaking at a 1998 San Diego Comic-Con panel, Simon recounted the meeting:

I had a suit and Jack thought that was really nice. He'd never seen a comic book artist with a suit before. The reason I had a suit was that my father was a tailor. Jack's father was a tailor too, but he made pants! Anyway, I was doing freelance work and I had a little office in New York about ten blocks from DC [Comics]' and Fox [Feature Syndicate]'s offices, and I was working on Blue Bolt for Funnies, Inc. So, of course, I loved Jack's work and the first time I saw it I couldn't believe what I was seeing. He asked if we could do some freelance work together. I was delighted and I took him over to my little office. We worked from the second issue of Blue Bolt ...

and remained a team across the next two decades. In the early 2000s, original art for an unpublished, five-page Simon and Kirby collaboration titled "Daring Disc", which may predate the duo's Blue Bolt, surfaced. Simon published the story in the 2003 updated edition of his autobiography, The Comic Book Makers, co-authored with his son, Jim.

After leaving Fox and landing at pulp magazine publisher Martin Goodman's Timely Comics (the future Marvel Comics), where Simon became the company's first editor, the Simon and Kirby team created the seminal patriotic hero Captain America. Captain America Comics #1 (March 1941), going on sale in December 1940 – a year before the bombing of Pearl Harbor but already showing the hero punching Hitler in the jaw – sold nearly one million copies. They remained on the hit series as a team through issue #10, and were established as a notable creative force in the industry. After the first issue was published, Simon asked Kirby to join the Timely staff as the company's art director.

Despite the success of the Captain America character, Simon felt Goodman was not paying the pair the promised percentage of profits, and so sought work for the two of them at National Comics, (later named DC Comics). Simon and Kirby negotiated a deal that would pay them a combined $500 a week, as opposed to the $75 and $85 they respectively earned at Timely. Fearing that Goodman would not pay them if he found out they were moving to National, the pair kept the deal a secret while they continued producing work for the company. At some point during this time, the duo also produced Fawcett Comics' Captain Marvel Adventures #1 (1941), the first complete comic book starring Captain Marvel following the character's run as star of the superhero anthology Whiz Comics.

Kirby and Simon spent their first weeks at National trying to devise new characters while the company sought how best to utilize the pair. After a few failed editor-assigned ghosting assignments, National's Jack Liebowitz told them to "just do what you want". The pair then revamped the Sandman feature in Adventure Comics and created the superhero Manhunter. In July 1942 they began the Boy Commandos feature. The ongoing "kid gang" series Boy Commandos, launched later that same year, was the team's first National feature to graduate into its own title. It sold over a million copies a month, becoming National's third best-selling title. They also scored a hit with the homefront kid-gang team, the Newsboy Legion in Star-Spangled Comics. In 2010, DC Comics writer and executive Paul Levitz observed that "Like Jerry Siegel and Joe Shuster, the creative team of Joe Simon and Jack Kirby was a mark of quality and a proven track record."

Harry Mendryk, art restorer on Titan Books' Simon and Kirby series of hardcover collections, believes Simon used the pseudonym Glaven on at least two covers during this time: those of Harvey Comics' Speed Comics #22 and Champ Comics #22 (both Sept. 1942), though the Grand Comics Database does not independently confirm this. Mendryk also believes that both Kirby and Simon used the pseudonym Jon Henri on a handful of other 1942 Harvey comics, as does Who's Who in American Comic Books 1929–1999.

Simon enlisted in the U.S. Coast Guard during World War II. He said in his 1990 autobiography that he was first assigned to the Mounted Beach Patrol at Long Beach Island, off Barnegat, New Jersey, for a year before being sent to boot camp near Baltimore, Maryland, for basic training. Afterward, he reported for duty with the Combat Art Corps in Washington, D.C., part of the Coast Guard Public Information Division. He was stationed there in 1944 when he met New York Post sports columnist Milt Gross, who was with the Coast Guard Public Relations Unit, and the two became roommates in civilian housing. Pursuant to his unit's mission to publicize the Coast Guard, Simon created a true-life Coast Guard comic book that DC agreed to publish, followed by versions syndicated nationally by Parents magazine in Sunday newspaper comics sections, under the title True Comics. This led to his being assigned to create a comic book aimed at driving Coast Guard recruitment. With Gross as his writer collaborator, Simon produced Adventure Is My Career, distributed by Street and Smith Publications for sale at newsstands.

Returning to New York City after his discharge as a petty officer 2nd class, Simon married Harriet Feldman, the secretary to Harvey Comics' Al Harvey. The Simons and the now-married Kirby and his wife and first child moved to houses diagonally across from each other on Brown Street in Mineola, New York, on Long Island, where Simon and Kirby each worked from a home studio.

=== Crestwood, Black Magic and romance comics ===
As superhero comics waned in popularity after the end of World War II, Simon and Kirby began producing a variety of stories in many genres. In partnership with Crestwood Publications, they developed the imprint Prize Group, through which they published Boys' Ranch and launched an early horror comic, the atmospheric and non-gory series Black Magic. The team also produced crime and humor comics, and are credited as well with publishing the first romance comics title, Young Romance, starting a successful trend.

At the urging of a Crestwood salesman, Kirby and Simon launched their own comics company, Mainline Publications, in late 1953 or early 1954, subletting space from their friend Al Harvey's Harvey Publications at 1860 Broadway. Mainline published four titles: the Western Bullseye: Western Scout; the war comic Foxhole, since EC Comics and Atlas Comics were having success with war comics, but promoting theirs as being written and drawn by actual veterans; In Love, since their earlier romance comic Young Love was still being widely imitated; and the crime comic Police Trap, which claimed to be based on genuine accounts by law-enforcement officials. Bitter that Timely Comics' 1950s iteration, Atlas Comics, had relaunched Captain America in a new series in 1954, Kirby and Simon created Fighting American. Simon recalled, "We thought we'd show them how to do Captain America". While the comic book initially portrayed the protagonist as an anti-Communist dramatic hero, Simon and Kirby turned the series into a superhero satire with the second issue, in the aftermath of the Army-McCarthy hearings and the public backlash against the Red-baiting U.S. Senator Joseph McCarthy.

The partnership ended in 1955 with the comic book industry beset by self-imposed censorship, negative publicity, and a slump in sales. Simon "wanted to do other things and I stuck with comics," Kirby recalled in 1971. "It was fine. There was no reason to continue the partnership and we parted friends." Simon turned primarily to advertising and commercial art, while dipping back into comics on occasion. The Simon and Kirby team reunited briefly in 1959 with Simon writing and collaborating on art for Archie Comics, where the duo updated the superhero the Shield in the two-issue The Double Life of Private Strong (June–Aug. 1959), and Simon created the superhero the Fly; they went on to collaborate on the first two issues of The Adventures of the Fly (Aug.–Sept. 1959), and Simon and other artists, including Al Williamson, Jack Davis, and Carl Burgos, did four issues before Simon moved on to work in commercial art.

=== Silver Age of Comics and later ===
Through the 1960s, Simon produced promotional comics for the advertising agency Burstein and Newman, becoming art director of Burstein, Phillips and Newman from 1964 to 1967. Concurrently, in 1960, he founded the satirical magazine Sick, a competitor of Mad magazine, and edited and produced material for it for over a decade.

During this period, known to fans and historians as the Silver Age of Comic Books, Simon and Kirby again reteamed for Harvey Comics in 1966, updating Fighting American for a single issue (Oct. 1966). Simon, as owner, packager, and editor, also helped launch Harvey's original superhero line, with Unearthly Spectaculars #1–3 (Oct. 1965 – March 1967) and Double-Dare Adventures #1–2 (Dec. 1966 – March 1967), the latter of which introduced the influential writer-artist Jim Steranko to comics.

In 1968, Simon created the two-issue DC Comics series Brother Power the Geek, about a mannequin given a semblance of life who wanders philosophically through 1960s hippie culture. Superman editor Mort Weisinger harbored an admitted dislike for the hippie subculture of the 1960s and felt that Simon portrayed them too sympathetically which helped to bring a quick end to the title. Simon and artist Jerry Grandenetti then created DC's four-issue Prez (Sept. 1973 – March 1974), about America's first teen-age president and the three-issue Champion Sports (Nov. 1973 – March 1974). That same year, Simon returned to the romance genre as editor of Young Romance and Young Love and oversaw a Black Magic reprint series.

Simon and Kirby teamed one last time later that year, with Simon writing the first issue (Winter 1974) of a six-issue new incarnation of the Sandman. Simon and Grandenetti then created the Green Team: Boy Millionaires in the DC anthology series 1st Issue Special #2 (May 1975), and the freakish Outsiders in 1st Issue Special #10 (Jan. 1976).

In 1999, Joe Simon regained the rights to the Fly and Lancelot Strong thanks to copyright termination.

=== 21st century ===
In the 2000s, Simon turned to painting and marketing reproductions of his early comic book covers. He appeared in various news media in 2007 in response to Marvel Comics' announced "death" of Captain America in Captain America vol. 5, #25 (March 2007), stating, "It's a hell of a time for him to go. We really need him now".

For a concept called ShieldMaster (1998), created by Jim Simon, Joe Simon provided prototype art. Shieldmaster, under the direction of Joe's son, Jim, was also published in the comic books Futura and Étranges Aventures. A graphic novel format ShieldMaster was published in 2015 by Future Retro Entertainment. ShieldMaster comics have also been published by Jim's son, Jesse Simon.

Simon is among the interview subjects in Superheroes: A Never-Ending Battle, a three-hour documentary narrated by Liev Schreiber that premiered posthumously on PBS in October 2013.

Simon's grandchildren attended the Los Angeles premiere of Captain America: The First Avenger and phoned Simon from the red carpet when his name was announced as the creator of the character. Though not present at the premiere, Joe Simon got to see Captain America: The First Avenger before he died in December 2011.

In 2024, Shieldmaster encounters several Joe Simon characters in ShieldMaster: Blast to Past, a one-shot with Shieldmaster traveling to the year 1963 and encountering several characters created or co-created by Joe Simon such as Fighting American, The Fly, Lancelot Strong, Comics. Stuntman and Captain 3-D.

== Legacy of Captain America ==
In 2024, the National Museum of American History announced the landmark acquisition of a rare copy of Captain America Comics #1 (1941), co-created by artist-writer Joe Simon and artist Jack Kirby. The museum recognized the issue as a vital historical document of American wartime identity, specifically noting the significance of its cover depicting Captain America punching Adolf Hitler months before the United States entered World War II.

== Personal life ==
Simon was married to Harriet Feldman (June 18, 1923 – October 28, 1971). The Simons had two sons and three daughters.

Simon died in New York City on December 14, 2011, at the age of 98, after a brief illness. As a World War II veteran, he was interred next to his wife at Long Island National Cemetery two days later.

Marvel Comics dedicated Avenging Spider-Man #5 to Simon.

== Awards ==
- Inkpot Award, 1998
- Will Eisner Comic Book Hall of Fame, 1999
- Inkwell Awards Joe Sinnott Hall of Fame, 2014.

Preceded by n/a	Marvel Comics Editor-in-Chief; 1939–1941	Succeeded by Stan Lee
Preceded by n/a	Captain America Comics writer/artist (with Jack Kirby); 1941–1942	Succeeded by Stan Lee (as writer); Al Avison (as artist)
