= List of Big Bang Comics characters =

This is a list of major characters appearing in the Big Bang Comics universe, which encompasses most fictional characters created for the shared Big Bang universe and those characters owned by Big Bang Comics.

== Big Bang heroes ==
- The Badge (based on Guardian (DC Comics) and Captain America both created by Simon and Kirby)
  - During WWII, he fought the Nazis as the Supreme Allied Commando, later became top agent of B.A.D.G.E., a spin on Nick Fury and S.H.I.E.L.D.
- The Beacon (based on Green Lantern)
  - Beacon (Earth A): Dr. Julia Gardner
  - Beacon (Earth B): Scott Martin
- Blackjack and his Flying Aces (based on Blackhawk)
- The Blitz (based on The Flash)
  - The Blitz (Earth A): Jimmy Travis
  - The Blitz (Earth B): Mack Snelling
- Bluebird (appears to be inspired by Black Canary created by Robert Kanigher and Carmine Infantino)
- Cyclone (based on Kid Flash, the Blitz's sidekick from Earth A)
  - Marty Eastman was addicted to the Rocket Pills that gave him his power. Later becomes the cybernetic Overdrive after being damaged in the explosion that killed the Blitz.
- Dimensioneer (teleportation via dimension control)
- Dr. Stellar
  - Combines elements of Doctor Mid-Nite, Starman, and Adam Strange.
- Dr. Weird (created by Howard Keltner who was inspired by the comic book character Mr. Justice who appeared in Blue Ribbon Comics published by MLJ Magazines. It has some resemblance to Doctor Fate and the Spectre).
- The Human Sub (based on Aquaman)
  - Later became The Atomic Sub
- The Hummingbird (based on Silver Age version of The Atom created by Gardner Fox and Gil Kane)
- Jeena (pronounced Gina) the Jungle Girl
  - Mentioned by Venus in Caliber #1, but has yet to make an appearance.
- Jon Cosmos (based on both Flash Gordon and Adam Strange)
- Knight Watchman (based on the Batman created by Bob Kane and Bill Finger for DC Comics)
  - Kid Galahad (based on Robin created by Bob Kane and Bill Finger and Jerry Robinson)
- Mighty Man (from the Savage Dragon)
  - A tribute to the original C. C. Beck created Captain Marvel published by Fawcett Comics. Mighty Man was created by Erik Larsen.
- Mike Merlin/Ms. Merlin (resembles Mark Merlin/Prince Ra-Man and has some similarity to Snapper Carr)
  - Mascot to the Roundtable of America.
- Mr. Martian (based on DC Comics's Martian Manhunter created by Joseph Samachson and Joe Certa)
- Mister U.S. (based on Joe Simon and Jack Kirby's creation Captain America and Commander Steel of DC Comics)
  - Mister US was a generic hero shown in issue #8 in six different incarnations from six different decades. The purpose was to poke fun at all the clichés in comics during each major era: the "Glittering Golden Age", the "Silly Side of the Silver Age", the "Pseudo-Intellectual Pseventies", the "'Oity-Toity Eighties", and the "Nigh-Incomprehensible Nineties".
- Moray (similar to Aqualad and Wonder Girl)
  - The Sub's granddaughter and sidekick
- Protoplasman (based on Jack Cole's Plastic Man)
- Robo-Hood first appeared in Big Bang #21. Little is known about Robo-Hood, but he seems to tackle street-level crime like muggers and pickpockets. He is a combination of Robotman and Green Arrow, but his actual name seems to derive from the legend of Robin Hood, the English freedom fighter (or outlaw) well known for his clashes with Sheriff of Nottingham.
- Shadowhawk (Silver Age)
  - A parody of the 1960-era Batman comics complete with the Shadowcar, Lady ShadowHawkette, Shadowdog and kid sidekick, Squirrel aka Hawk Shadow. He is working with Knight Watchman.
- Shadow Lady (based on Phantom Lady created by the Eisner & Iger studio for Fox Feature Syndicate)
- Speed Queen (member of the RTA)
- The Sphinx (a hero from an Egypt-dominated alternate Earth, similar to Hawkman created by Gardner Fox and Dennis Neville)
  - Sphinx: Peter Chefren/Chefren Ra
  - Sphinx: Allison Kane
- Stars 'n' Stripes
  - Possibly a reference to the Star-Spangled Kid and Stripesy. He appeared on a mock-up cover of the metafictional Red Hot Comics, but haven't been seen since.
- Super Frankenstein (possibly based on the 1960s Frankenstein by Dell Comics)
- Teen Rex (based on Kamandi created by Jack Kirby for DC Comics with a hint of Kirby's Devil Dinosaur for Marvel Comics)
  - Billed as the "Last of the Dino Men".
- Thunder Girl (based on C. C. Beck's creation Mary Marvel)
- Ultiman (based on Superman created by Jerry Siegel and Joe Shuster for DC Comics)
  - Ultragirl (based on Supergirl created by Otto Binder and Al Plastino for DC Comics)
  - Ultiman's daughter (Earth B)
- US Angel (Golden Age winged hero)
- Venus (some resemblance to Wonder Woman)
- Vita-Man (based on Hourman created by Ken Fitch and Bernard Baily for DC Comics)
- Zhantika Princess of the Jungle (most likely based on Sheena but may just be a generic jungle girl)

== Big Bang hero teams ==
=== Round Table of America (RTA) Earth A ===
Based on the Justice League title published by DC Comics:

- Ultiman
- Knight Watchman
- Thunder Girl
- The Blitz: Jimmy Travis
- Beacon: Dr. Julia Gardner
- Human Sub
- Mike Merlin (team mascot, first appeared in Image issue #12)

=== Knights of Justice Earth B ===
Based on the Justice Society title published by DC Comics:

- Ultiman
- Dr. Weird
- The Blitz: Mack Snelling
- Beacon: Scott Martin
- Venus

=== Pantheon of Heroes Earth A ===
Based on the Legion of Super-Heroes title published by DC Comics:

- Clone Boy (founder)
- Gravity Girl (founder)
- Laughing Boy (founder)
- Galactic Lad: Noa Zark
- Snowstar
- Anglefish
- Nature Boy (deceased)
- Brain Boy
- Telegirl
- Ghost Girl
- Photon (formerly Lamp Lass)
- Jupiter Boy
- Dragonfist (formerly Combat Kid)
- Anti-Matter Lad
- Golden Girl
- Stacy & Tracy the Titan Twins
- Butterfly Queen
- Omega Boy
- Robo Kid
- Kid Warlock
- Lionclaw
- Aviatrix
- Manta Rae
- Ant Boy

=== Verdict ===
Based on the Outsiders title published by DC Comics:

- Psi-Mage
- Kuttar
- Hot-Wire
- Quintessence

=== Whiz Kids (Whizzards) Earth A ===
Based on the Teen Titans title published by DC Comics:

- Kid Galahad (based on Robin / Nightwing)
- Moray (based on Aqualad and Wonder Girl)
- Cyclone (based on Kid Flash / Flash)
- Thunder Girl (based on Mary Marvel)
- She-Borg (based on Cyborg)
- Black Power
- Totem
- Gargoyla
- Hot Pink

== Big Bang humor strips ==
- Op the Cop: A humour strip written by Gary Carlson, featured in Caliber Press #1. Op hasn't appeared since.
- Percy: The second and final humour strip in Big Bang Comics, this time satirising the older generation of science-fiction films. He appeared in Image Comics #1.
