= Robert Beerbohm =

American comic book historian and retailer (1952–2024)

- Born: Robert Lee Beerbohm; June 17, 1952; Long Beach, California, U.S.
- Died: March 27, 2024 (aged 71); Fremont, Nebraska, U.S.
- Education: University of Nebraska–Lincoln; California State University, Hayward
- Occupations: Comic book historian, publisher, distributor and retailer

Robert Lee Beerbohm (June 17, 1952 – March 27, 2024) was an American comic book historian and retailer who was intimately involved with the rise of comics fandom from 1966. Beginning as a teenager in the late 60s, he became a fixture in the growing comic convention scene, while in the 1970s and 1980s he was heavily involved in Bay Area comic book retailing and distribution.

Beerbohm was a consultant and author detailing the early history of comics in the United States, including rediscovering the first comic book in America, Rodolphe Töpffer's The Adventures of Mr. Obadiah Oldbuck. He has supplied data and visual aids as listed in the acknowledgements of over 200 books about comics.

Known as combination pugnacious businessman, archaeologist, and what cartoonist Art Spiegelman called a "feverishly enthusiastic fan," Beerbohm was an evangelist of the comics collecting hobby.

== Early life ==
Robert Lee Beerbohm was born June 17, 1952 in Long Beach, California. In his youth, he lived in Saudi Arabia for several years, before moving to Fremont, Nebraska, where he graduated from Fremont High School. He attended the University of Nebraska–Lincoln from 1970 to 1972.

== Career ==
=== Robert Beerbohm Comic Art ===
In October 1966, while still in junior high school, Beerbohm took out his first ad in Rocket's Blast Comicollector (a.k.a. RBCC) #47, launching what has eventually become known as Robert Beerbohm Comic Art. By the 21st century Beerbohm was selling vintage American popular culture artifacts (mostly comic books) via the Internet, and setting up shows across the United States.

Beerbohm set up a booth at his first comics convention June 16–18, 1967, at the first Houstoncon. Traveling 28 hours on a Greyhound bus, Beerbohm turned 15 the first day of that show.

Beerbohm was among the first generation of dealers to traffic in original comic book art, sourcing his originals from suppliers with sometimes questionable provenance, claiming to have bought hundreds of allegedly stolen pages of Marvel and DC art from dealers set up in a hotel room at the 1969 27th World Science Fiction Convention in St. Louis.

=== Comics and Comix ===
In late August 1972 (ten days after the first San Diego Comic-Con at El Cortez Hotel), with housemate Bud Plant and John Barrett, Beerbohm co-opened Comics and Comix on Telegraph Avenue in Berkeley, California.

In April 1973 Comics & Comix hosted the first Bay Area comics convention, Berkeleycon 73, in the Pauley Ballroom in the ASUC Building on the University of California, Berkeley campus. Berkeleycon was the first comic-con that highlighted underground comix.

During Berkeleycon, Beerbohm, Barrett, and Bud Plant purchased what became known as the Tom Reilly Pedigree collection of close to 4000 white-paper, never-opened "near mint/mint" comic books published between 1939 and 1945. Tom Reilly had enlisted in the Navy in 1941. His parents, in the affluent Piedmont section of Oakland, California, kept buying one of each comic, placing them untouched on shelves in their son's bedroom. Tom was killed during a kamikaze attack in the Pacific, in 1945. His parents sealed the room. They died in December 1972. Beerbohm and partners ended up with most of the collection through a protracted series of events taking place from April to June 1972. Within three months they had opened three more stores, calling the company Comics and Comix.

Beerbohm, Barrett, and Plant, as Comics & Comix, published the first three issues of Jack Katz' The First Kingdom beginning in 1974. They also published comics by Jim Pinkoski and Dan O'Neill during Beerbohm's involvement.

=== Best of Two Worlds ===
Beerbohm sold out in early 1975. He went 'solo' opening his first Best of Two Worlds early Nov 1976 at 1707 Haight St, San Francisco. By May 1977 he opened a 2nd Best of Two Worlds on Telegraph Ave near UC-Berkeley, taking over his ex-partner's old location a block apart.

On Oct 4, 1978, with partner Gary Wood, he opened The Funny Pages on Pier 30, the first high-traffic tourist location comic bookstore in America, according to Beerbohm. San Francisco's Fisherman's Wharf was then one of the largest tourist attractions in the world. This location sold high-end popular culture artifacts. In 1980 Beerbohm opened a third Best of Two Worlds on 4th St in Santa Rosa. In 1982 Gary Wood sold his 50% to Robert Borden. In early 1985 Borden and Beerbohm sold 14% to Rory Root.

In February 1986 snow-melt flood waters cascaded out of the Sierra Nevada mountains, causing widespread property damage in much of northern California. Best of Two Worlds central warehouse was mostly destroyed. It contained a million comic books, half a million cards, 10,000 concert posters, 3000 pages of original comic book art, plus 90% of Beerbohm's comics fandom archives 1966–1985.

=== Best Comics ===
After Best of Two Worlds was forced by natural disaster into bankruptcy, Beerbohm went solo again with a single store in Haight Ashbury, but moved to a better location at Masonic, a major bus transfer hub. Here Beerbohm rebuilt almost from scratch once again, with signings by notable comics artists like a December 1987 Bill Sienkiewicz event and a growing relationship with Rick Griffin, who moved into the neighbourhood in 1988.

=== Best Comics and Rock Art Gallery ===
On June 1, 1991, Beerbohm, with silent-partner Edward Walker, opened Best Comics and Rock Art Gallery, an art gallery initially centering on seminal rock poster illustrator Rick Griffin in Fisherman's Wharf at The Cannery. The store's grand opening party June 1, 1991, featured bands like Big Brother and The Holding Company, New Riders of the Purple Sage, members of Quicksilver Messenger Service, It's a Beautiful Day, the Irish band Phoenix, and others. Two and a half months later, Griffin was killed in a motorcycle accident. Immediately after, the Griffin family attempted through legal means to restrict the sale of artworks through the gallery, but the lawsuit was dropped. Beerbohm and Walker closed the gallery in 1992.

=== Historian ===
As a comics historian, Beerbohm rediscovered the first comic book in America, Rodolphe Töpffer's The Adventures of Mr. Obadiah Oldbuck, published on September 14, 1842, in New York City, as Brother Jonathan Extra No. IX, which is in the same format as a "modern" day comic book, sans staples, which had not yet been invented. For many years, Beerbohm was working on a massive history of comics retailing from the 19th Century through to the development of distribution networks for Underground Comics and the Direct market to be titled "Comic Book Store Wars" but the book remained unpublished at the time of his death. Beerbohm maintained a Facebook group with the same title and had published a 91-page book with the same title in 1994.

Beerbohm was also fundamental on the 1971 rediscovery of the first Superman cover pencilled by Joe Shuster in 1933. The cover was the last remaining art from the very first Superman comic book produced by Siegel and Shuster to be published by Chicago-based Humor Publishing. He received the art from Russ Cochran who got the art from Bill Gaines in 1969 who re-discovered the four torn up pieces jammed up behind a drawer in his father Max Gaines' desk which had sat untouched since August 1947. In 1975, Beerbohm had Joe Shuster validate the origins of the cover during San Diego Comic-Con.

According to comic book historian Charles Hatfield, Beerbohm's contribution to the study of the Direct Market was threefold: 1.the idea that dealer speculation was at the root of the new distribution system; 2. the idea that so-called affidavit return fraud created a need for better distribution on the part of publishers; and 3. the growth of head shops as an outlet for Underground comics and a model for the Direct Market.

== Death ==
Beerbohm died in Fremont, Nebraska from colorectal cancer on March 27, 2024, at the age of 71.

== Bibliography ==
- Comic Book Store Wars (Fremont, Nebraska : R.L. Beerbohm, 1994. -- 91 p.)
- "The first Superman cover ever" (Comics Buyer's Guide #1165, March 15, 1996, page 40)
- "The Big Bang Theory of Comic Book History" (Comic Book Marketplace, 1997)
- "The Mainline Comics Story: An Initial Examination" (Jack Kirby Collector #25, 1998)
- "Secret Origins of the Direct Market Part One: 'Affidavit Returns' - The Scourge of Distribution" (Comic Book Artist #6, Oct. 1999)
- "Secret Origins of the Direct Market Part Two: Phil Seuling and the Undergrounds Emerge," (Comic Book Artist #7, Mar. 2000)
- "The Illustrated Books of Frank King" (Comic Art #1, 2001)
- "Topffer in America" (Comic Art #3, 2003) (with Doug Wheeler and Leonardo De Sa)
- "The American Comic Book: 1929-Present: The Modern Comics Magazine Supplants the Earlier Formats" (Overstreet Comic Book Price Guide #27, 1997 thru 49, 2019) (with Richard Olson, PhD) — Three articles grew in size and scope which were continuously expanded and revised every year by the authors covering a "Victorian Age" (1842-1890s), a "Platinum Age" 1890s thru 1934 as well as an in-depth Origin of the Modern Comic Book 1921-1970s which ran thru #40.
