= Howard Who? =

1986 short story collection by Howard Waldrop

Cover of the first edition, published by Doubleday. Art by Margo Herr.

Howard Who? is a science fiction short story collection by American writer Howard Waldrop. It was released on July 1, 1986.

== Contents ==
- "Howard Who?" (introduction by George R. R. Martin)
- "The Ugly Chickens" (Nebula Award winner)
- "Der Untergang des Abendlandesmenschen"
- "Ike at the Mike"
- "Dr. Hudson's Secret Gorilla"
- "...The World, as We Know't"
- "Green Brother"
- "Mary Margaret Road-Grader"
- "Save a Place in the Lifeboat for Me"
- "Horror, We Got"
- "Man-Mountain Gentian"
- "God's Hooks!"
- "Heirs of the Perisphere"
