= Jake Saunders (writer) =

American comics writer and retailer

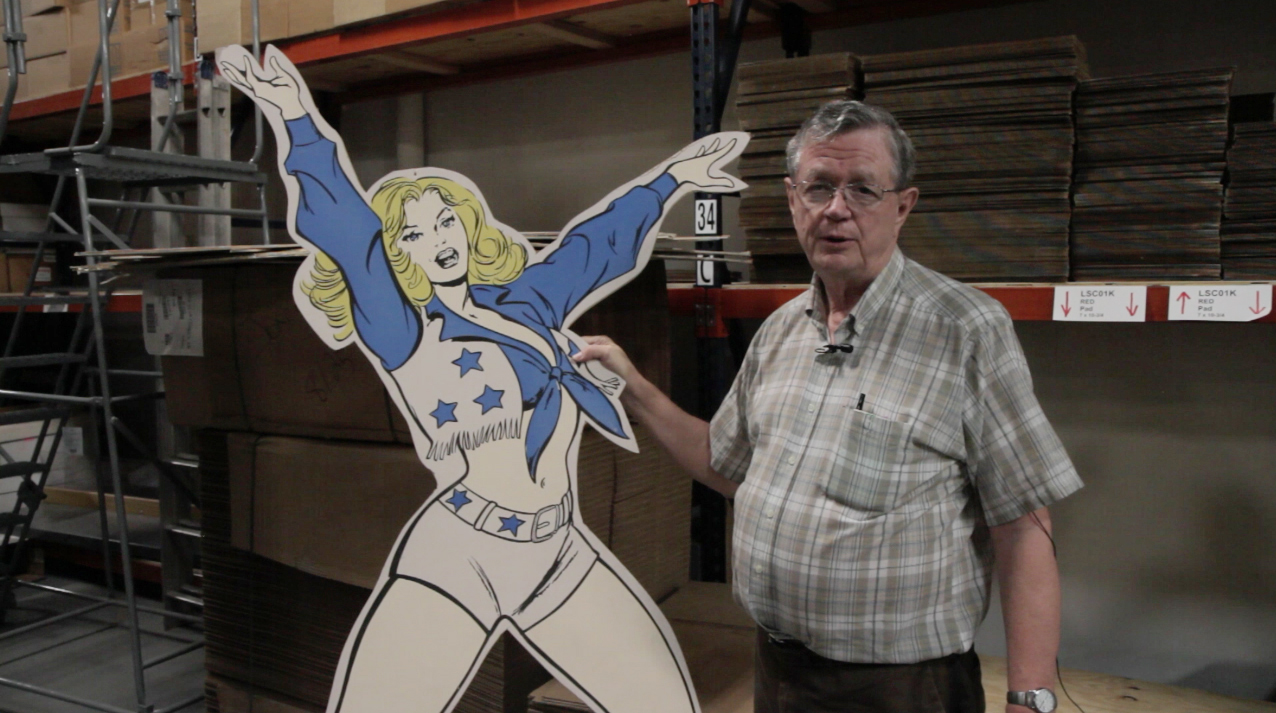
- Buddy Saunders (right) in his warehouse with Dallas Cowboy Cheerleader cutout during production of the short documentary "Dallas Marvels" in 2015
- Born: Jacob Saunders; 1947 (age 78–79)
- Occupations: Writer and businessman
- Spouse: Judy
- Children: 1
- Writing career
- Pen name: Buddy Saunders; Don Fowler
- Genre: Science fiction

Jake "Buddy" Saunders (born 1947) is an American author and businessman, working in the fields of comic books and science fiction.

== Work ==
Saunders started out in the world of fanzines. As part of the "Texas Trio" (with Larry Herndon and Howard Keltner), Saunders published the fanzine Star-Studded Comics from 1963 to 1972. It featured early work by George R. R. Martin, Grass Green, Jim Starlin, Roy Thomas, Sam Grainger, Alan Weiss, Dave Cockrum, Mike Vosburg, Biljo White, and Keltner, among others, and featured the early appearances of Dr. Weird, Xal-Kor, Wildman and The Eye. Saunders' cover for its second issue won an Alley Award in the amateur division in 1963. In addition, during this period Saunders was a regular contributor (as an artist) to the seminal comic book fanzine Rocket's Blast Comicollector (RBCC).

Saunders operated his own mail order service starting in 1961. He owned and operated Lone Star Comics, a chain of seven Texas comic book stores founded in 1977. With the sale of the Lone Star comic book store chain in 2013, Mr. Saunders and his family now operate the online Lone Star Comics, www.mycomicshop.com.

As a writer, he co-authored A Voice and Bitter Weeping with Howard Waldrop, later expanded into the 1974 novel The Texas-Israeli War: 1999, as well as Time and Variance, with Waldrop and Steven Utley. Saunders' story "Back to the Stone Age'" was nominated for a Nebula Award for Best Short Story in 1976. Saunders' recent work includes two novels based on the works of Edgar Rice Burroughs: The Martian Legion (2014) and Tarzan and the Cannibal King (2017).

In 2020, Saunders attracted controversy for sharing false information regarding COVID-19 via his mailing list, which he continued to do as recently as 2023. Saunders also made unsupported claims on his blog, Buddy's Soapbox, that the 2020 presidential election was stolen from Donald Trump via voter fraud.
