= Houstoncon =

Annual multi-genre fan convention

- Status: Defunct
- Genre: Comic books, television, movies, pop culture
- Locations: Houston, Texas
- Country: United States
- Inaugurated: 1967; 59 years ago
- Most recent: 1982; 44 years ago
- Organizer: Roy Bonario; Marc Schooley; Ed Blair, Jr.

Houstoncon was an annual multi-genre fan convention which was held between 1967 and 1982 in Houston, Texas. Houstoncon started out as a member of the Southwesterncon series of regional conventions, but eventually became an independent con. Most Houstoncons took place over three days in June, from Friday to Sunday. The founders of Houstoncon were Roy Bonario and Marc Schooley; Houston area entrepreneur Earl Blair, Jr. was also a key member of the organizing committee.

Houstoncon featured a large range of pop culture elements, primarily comic books but also radio and television serials, science fiction/fantasy (particularly Star Trek), film/television, animation, toys, and horror, as well as a costume contest. Nostalgia for times past played an important role: all Houstoncon events featured screenings of classic science fiction films and old television serials. The convention featured panels with comic book professionals, and floorspace for exhibitors, including comic book dealers and collectibles merchants. The show included an autograph area, as well as an Artists' Alley where comics artists signed autographs and sold or did free sketches. (Despite the name, Artists' Alley could include writers, celebrities, and even glamour models.)

The 1974, 1975, and 1976 Houstoncons were joint productions with the annual Star Trek convention. The final Houstoncon — really a Star Trek convention — was a debacle later dubbed the "Con of Wrath".

== History ==
=== Southwesterncon era ===
Roy Bonario, Gene Arnold, Marc Schooley and a group of Houston-based comic book fans founded the Houston Comic Collector's Association (HCCA) in 1965.

Houstoncon came out of a partnership between the HCCA and Larry Herndon, the Dallas-based organizer of Southwesterncon, which had debuted in Dallas in 1966. Houstoncon started out as an every-other-year affair; the initial plan was explained by Oklahoma Alliance of Fans co-founder Bart Bush: "Dallas held the first Southwesterncon in 1966, Houston held the second one in 1967, and then it went back to Dallas in 1968. The idea is that they would each do the con every other year."

The HCCA, spearheaded by Bonario and fellow enthusiasts Marc Schooley and Jerry Poscovsky, put on the first Houstoncon (officially known as the Houston Comic Convention) at the Ramada Inn on June 16–18, 1967. The first Houstoncon attracted 124 attendees.

Ed Blair, Jr. was chairman of Houstoncon from 1969 to 1975. Southwesterncon IV/ Houstoncon '69 took place June 20–22, 1969, at Houston's Ramada Inn.

=== Post-Southwesterncon ===
By 1971, territorial issues between Houston and Dallas had frayed the Southwesterncon alliance, and Houstoncon went out on its own, eventually becoming an annual event. The convention was now run by Blair with the help of legendary fandom publisher G. B. Love.

Houstoncon '71 — the first convention after the HCCA's split from Southwesterncon — took place June 17–20, 1971, and featured Superman actor Kirk Alyn at his first fan convention. (Alyn ended up appearing at five Houstoncons in total.) Southwesterncon VI, meanwhile, took place in Dallas on July 8–11, 1971.

Houstoncon 1973 was held June 21–24 at the Marriott Motor Hotel in Houston, attracting over 2,000 attendees; guests include Kirk Alyn, Frank Coghlan, Jr., William Benedict, William Witney, Dave Sharpe, Tom Steele, Jock Mahoney, Jim Harmon, Fred Fredericks, Al Williamson, and Don Newton. Vintage films and serials shown at the con featured Tarzan, Sherlock Holmes, Captain Marvel, and Dr. Jekyll & Mr. Hyde. Houstoncon 1973 became notorious for a major van crash involving Robert Beerbohm, Bud Plant, Terry Stroud and Dick Swan as they were leaving the show. From this point forward (through 1980), Houstoncon became an annual event.

Houstoncon 1974 was held June 20–23 at Houston's Sheraton-Lincoln Hotel, attracting over 2,500 attendees. That year the show merged with the local Star Trek convention and was co-produced by Earl Blair, Jr. with G. B. Love; guests included Walter Koenig, Al Williamson, Dan Adkins, Don Newton, Don Newton, Kenneth Smith, Fred Fredericks, Jock Mahoney, Kirk Alyn, Tom Steele, William Benedict, and stuntman Dave Sharpe.

The 1975 show, which took place June 25–29 at the Royal Coach Inn, was again merged with the Houston Star Trek convention; guests included C. C. Beck, George Takei, Jock Mahoney, John Wooley, and Don "Red" Barry. Beck and Barry served as judges for the costume contest.

For the 1976 and 1977 editions of Houstoncon, Schooley and Bonario resumed control, with Blair consulting. Guests of the 1976 show — which again doubled as "Star Trek '76" — included George Takei, Grace Lee Whitney, and Johnny Weissmuller. Houstoncon '77 guests included Frank Brunner, Spanky McFarland, Jock Mahoney, George Takei, Forrest J Ackerman, and Roy Rogers.

Houstoncon '78 guests include Frankie Thomas, Kirk Alyn, Ron Goulart, Gil Kane, Jenette Kahn, Frank Brunner, Ray Harryhausen, Greg Jein, Jim Newsome, and Paula Crist.

Houstoncon '79 guests included Walter Koenig, Chuck Jones, and George Pérez.

Houstoncon '80 took place June 20–22; featured guests included John Byrne and George Pérez. No Houstoncon took place in 1981.

=== Ultimate Fantasy/Con of Wrath ===
The final Houstoncon, held June 19–20, 1982, at The Summit, an indoor sports arena, was also known as "Ultimate Fantasy" (and later "The Con of Wrath", an allusion to Star Trek II: The Wrath of Khan). Organized by local fan Jerry Wilhite, and scheduled for shortly after the release of Star Trek II, Ultimate Fantasy assembled almost the entire main cast of the original Star Trek TV series as guests of the show, which was promoted with magazine advertising, laser light shows, billboards, a huge venue, and other promotional gimmicks. Due to poor sales, however, only a few hundred people attended the convention; the resulting debacle was later the subject of a documentary film.

== Dates and locations ==
- 1967 (June 16–18) Houston Comic Convention a.k.a. Southwesterncon II (Ramada Inn)
- 1969 (June 20–22) Houston Comic Convention a.k.a. Southwesterncon IV (Ramada Inn)
- 1971 (June 17–20) Houstoncon '71
- 1973 (June 21–24) Houstoncon (Marriott Motor Hotel)
- 1974 (June 20–23) Houstoncon '74/Star Trek '74 (Sheraton-Lincoln Hotel)
- 1975 (June 25–29) Houstoncon/Star Trek '75 (Royal Coach Inn)
- 1976 (June 17–20) Houstoncon '76 / Star Trek '76 (Royal Coach Inn)
- 1977 (June)
- 1978 (June 23–25) Houston Con
- 1979 (June 22–24) Houston Con
- 1980 (June 20–22) Houston Con 80
- 1982 (June 19–20) Ultimate Fantasy (Shamrock Hilton Convention Center/The Summit)

== Legacy ==
From 1983 to 1996, Houston was the site of the annual Comix Fair, a smaller-scale convention primarily focused on comic books.

On August 7–8, 1993, the University of Houston hosted the first annual "Houston Comic Book Festival", with official guests Chris Claremont, Matt Wagner, Kelley Jones, Joe St. Pierre, Evan Dorkin, and Mike Leeke.

In 2001 local retailer Bedrock City Comics produced a "Houstoncon" show on September 15–16 (shortly after the September 11 attacks) at the Holiday Inn. An homage to the original Houstoncon, guests include Harry Knowles, John Lucas, and Scott Gilbert.
