= Federal Aid Road Act of 1916 =

United States highway funding legislation

Federal Aid Highway Act of 1916
- Long title: An act to provide that the United States shall aid the States in the construction of rural post roads, and for other purposes.
- Nicknames: Bankhead–Shackleford Act; Good Roads Act
- Enacted by: the 64th United States Congress
- Effective: July 11, 1916

Citations
- Public law: Pub. L. 64–156
- Statutes at Large: 39 Stat. 355

Legislative history
- Signed into law by President Woodrow Wilson on July 11, 1916

The Federal Aid Road Act of 1916 (also known as the Bankhead–Shackleford Act and Good Roads Act), Pub. L. 64–156, 39 Stat. 355, was enacted on July 11, 1916, and was the first federal highway funding legislation in the United States. The rise of the automobile at the start of the 20th century, especially after the low-price Ford Model T in 1908, created a demand for better roads on a national level. The act provided federal subsidies to road-building efforts.

== Origin ==
The act was introduced by Rep. Dorsey W. Shackleford (D) of Missouri, then amended by Sen. John H. Bankhead (D) of Alabama to conform with model legislation written by the American Association of State Highway Officials (AASHO). It provided $75 million in federal 50–50 matching funds to the states to build up to 6% of their roads statewide over a five-year period.

President Woodrow Wilson signed the Federal Aid Road Act on July 11, 1916 at a ceremony attended by members of AASHO, American Automobile Association, and various farm organizations.

Wilson was an ardent advocate of good roads and made them a party platform in 1916: "The happiness, comfort and prosperity of rural life, and the development of the city, are alike conserved by the construction of public highways. We, therefore, favor national aid in the construction of post roads and roads for military purposes".

Under the act, federal funding was provided for rural post roads on the condition that they be open to the public at no charge. Funding was to be distributed to the states based on a formula incorporating each state's geographic area, population, and existing road network. To obtain the funding, states were required to submit project plans, surveys, specifications, and estimates to the United States secretary of agriculture.

== Effect ==
The Federal Aid Road Act, as the first federal highway funding law, was instrumental in extending and improving the country's road system. Prior to its passage (and for several decades afterward), the condition of many roads was deplorable. Richard F. Weingroff, the Federal Highway Administration's historian, wrote, "They were often little more than trails that were muddy in the rain and dusty the rest of the time. Any long trip by automobile required not only time, patience, and ingenuity, but tire-patching equipment, tools, spare parts, and emergency food and fuel". A growing interest in road improvements was spurred by farmers who needed roads to take their goods to market, the introduction of Rural Free Delivery by the Postal Service, and the burgeoning popularity of the personal automobile. The 1907 Supreme Court case Wilson v. Shaw also paved the way for passage of the roads act by holding that the Commerce Clause authorized Congress to construct interstate highways.

By 1917, every state had a highway agency to administer federal funds. World War I and its concomitant demands on personnel and materials impeded the implementation of the 1916 act, as did the act's small appropriation and its limit on federal funding to $10,000 per mile. These and other problems were addressed in the next national road bill, the Federal Aid Highway Act of 1921 (Phipps Act).
