= Protoplasman =

Publication information
- Publisher: Big Bang Comics
- First appearance: (in comics); Policemen Comics #1 (in reality); Big Bang Presents #1
- Created by: Mort Todd (artist); Gary Carlson (writer)

In-story information
- Alter ego: None
- Place of origin: Earth A
- Supporting character of: Knight Watchman (sometimes)
- Notable aliases: The Human Water Balloon
- Abilities: Body elasticity

Protoplasman is a Big Bang Comics superhero, who first appeared in Big Bang's self-published issue, Big Bang Presents #1, though his metafictional debut was in Policeman Comics (a tribute to Police Comics, where Plastic Man debuted), itself a division of Quantity Comics (a pastiche of Quality Comics), created by writer Gary Carlson and artist Mort Todd.

== Fictional character biography ==
Protoplasman is the comic-relief superhero of the Big Bang world, who works closely with Knight Watchman either as a partner or as an assistant. Although his powers are sometimes described as elasticity, that appears to be false information. When using his powers, Protoplasman seems to take on a liquid-like form, suggesting that his powers are derived from fluidity, rather than elasticity.

Since Big Bang Comics began self-publishing, Protoplasman has become a favourite with fans, with a sense of humor derived from Plastic Man (on whom he was based) and the zany attitude of Canadian actor Jim Carrey.

A collection of the Protoplasman comics was released in Spring 2009 called All-Protoplasman Color Cavalcade #1, co-published by Big Bang Comics and Comicfix.
