= Vita-Man =

Publication information
- Publisher: Big Bang Comics
- First appearance: Big Bang Comics #1
- Created by: Gary Carlson and Mark Lewis

In-story information
- Alter ego: Will Wheeler
- Abilities: Super strength, speed and constitution via Panacea Pills

Vita-Man is a superhero published by Big Bang Comics. He first appears in Big Bang Comics #1, and was created by Gary Carlson and Mark Lewis. He is based on Hourman.

== Publication history ==
Vita-Man first appears on the back cover of Big Bang #0 starring in the fictional Red Hot Comics #14. After numerous reader requests to see Vita-Man in action, he finally gets his own story in Big Bang Comics #27.

== Fictional character biography ==
Vita-Man is research scientist Will Wheeler, who discovered a new vitamin that gave him superpowers, which he named "Panacea Pills", the name given to the vitamins after his father created them. With this, he became the superhero Vita-Man (a play on the word vitamin), and later joined the Knights of Justice alongside Ultiman, Venus and Dr. Stellar.

== Powers and abilities ==
The three Panacea Pills that give Vita-Man his powers empower him with super strength, constitution and speed.
