= Comic Relief (disambiguation) =

Comic Relief is a United Kingdom charity for the needy.

Comic Relief may also refer to:

- Comic relief, the comedic term.
- Comic Relief, Inc., a United States charity working to break the cycle of poverty.
- Comic Relief USA, a defunct United States charity for the homeless.
- Comic Relief (retailer), a former comic book retail store run by Rory Root in Berkeley, California.
- "Comic Relief", a 2001 episode of Dexter's Laboratory.
