= Beacon (character) =

The Beacon
- Both Beacons and Hummingbird, artist Rich Buckler.

Publication information
- Publisher: Big Bang Comics
- First appearance: Big Bang Comics #3 (October 1994)
- Created by: Chris Ecker (writer); Gary S. Carlson (writer); Steve Adams (artist)

In-story information
- Alter ego: Julie Gardener; Scott Martin
- Abilities: Superstrength; Energy absorption Forcefield

Beacon is the name of two fictional characters published by Big Bang Comics. The Beacon of Earth-A (Julie Gardener) is a Silver Age character. The Beacon of Earth-B (Scott Martin) is a Golden Age character. Both characters first appear in Big Bang Comics #3 (October 1994), and were created by Bud Hanzel, Chris Ecker and Steve Adams.

The characters are a pastiche of the Golden Age and Silver Age Green Lanterns of DC Comics. Scott Martin is equivalent to Earth-2's Alan Scott and is named for him and his creator Martin Nodell, and Julie Gardener is equivalent to Earth-1's Hal Jordan (although her name may also be a reference to Guy Gardner, it is more likely a reference to Julius Schwartz who was frequently credited as Julie Schwartz and Gardner Fox).

== Fictional character biography ==
=== Earth-A Beacon ===
Born in 1943, Son of German Priests Julie Gardener discovered the crystal after it fell to Earth. By holding it in her hand. Julie could summon up whatever powers she desired. She realized that with the crystal, she could be invincible or even immortal.

When she met The Beacon on Earth-B during the Criss-Cross Crisis, the two drew the energy from similar stars to bridge the void between the two Earths to prevent them from colliding.

In 1989, the Roundtable of America disbanded, with Cyclone / Overdrive crippled, the Knight Watchman retired and The Blitz missing in action. The Hall of Heroes became a museum, and Julie Gardener moved from Gateway City to Capitol City to become its curator.

In Big Bang #4 (1994), an enemy of the Atomic Sub known as The Sub-Human returned to exterminate the Roundtable after a humiliating defeat by The Sub many years ago. In the process, he shattered The Beacon's crystal, causing her to die soon after.

=== Earth-B Beacon ===
Geologist Scott Martin discovered fragments of alien crystals in a cave that housed a massive underground city. The city itself was powered by the massive Ko-Dan crystal. Scott defeated the city's ruler Tyrnos in a battle of wills to gain control over a shard of the crystal, Scott won and the crystal embedded itself in his hardhat's lamp holder, and he later became The Beacon.

== Powers and abilities ==
Both Beacon's use alien Ko-Dan power crystals as a weapon. The crystals emit different colours for different actions:

- Red - absorb energy
- Green - superstrength
- Yellow - defense

When the Earth-A Beacon's crystal is shattered, a large explosion occurs as the energy begins to leak out. When all energy was released, all that remained was a pinkish-purple shell.
