= Bud Plant Inc. =

Comics distributor and retailer

Bud Plant, Inc.
- Company type: Comic book distributor
- Industry: Comics
- Founded: 1970; 56 years ago
- Founder: Bud Plant
- Defunct: 1988 (as distributor; still operates as mail-order business)
- Headquarters: San Jose, California, then Grass Valley, California

Bud Plant Inc. was a wholesale comics distributor active in the 1970s and 1980s during the growth of the direct market. The company also published a selection of comics and zines during the same period. Starting in 1970 as a mail-order distributor specializing in underground comix, Bud Plant absorbed some of his smaller rivals in the 1980s, and then sold his business to Diamond Comics Distributors in 1988. He still, as Bud Plant's Art Books, sells quality reprints and graphic novels.

== History ==
=== Origins ===
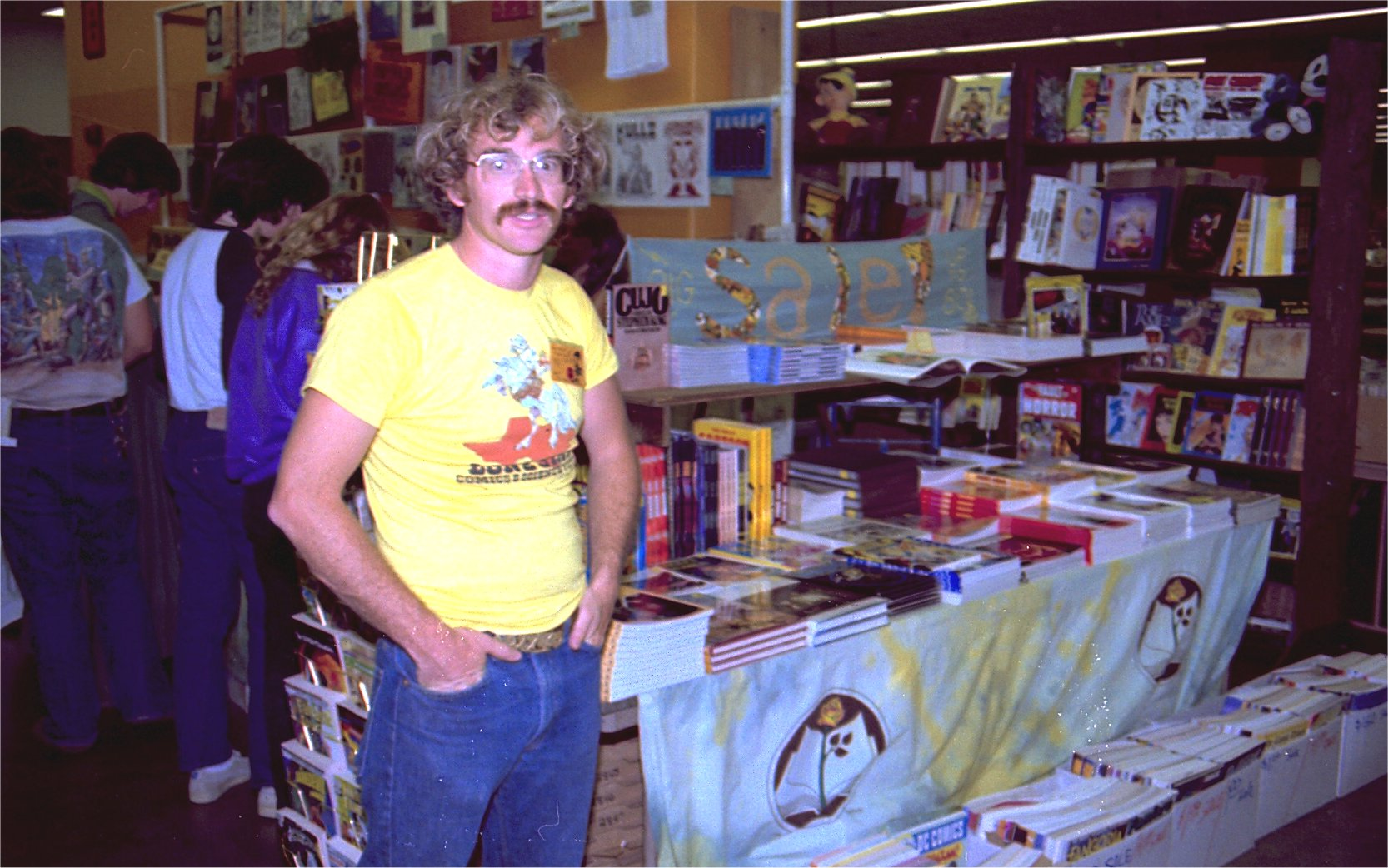
Bud Plant at the 1982 San Diego Comic-Con

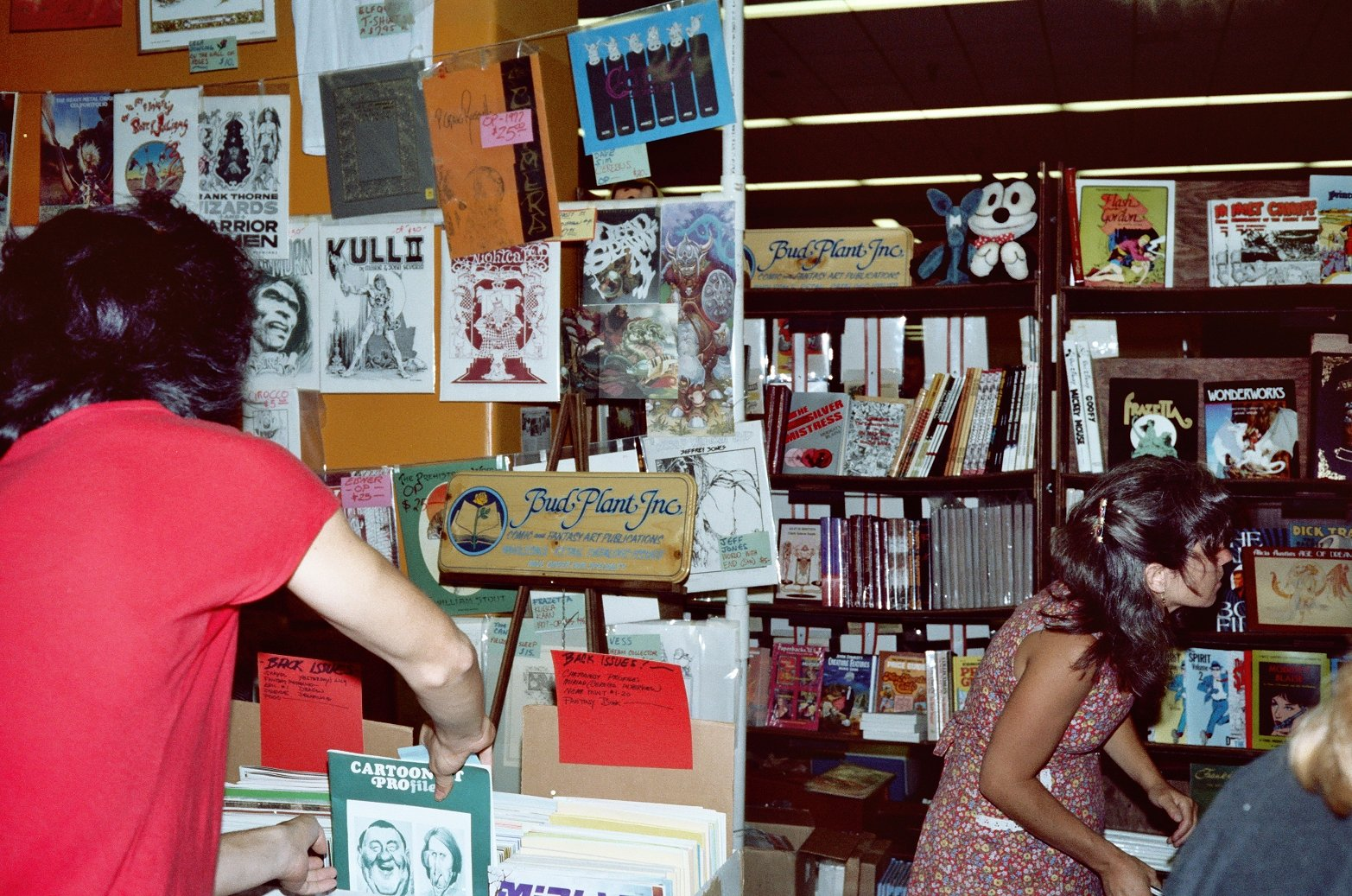
Bud Plant's booth at the 1982 San Diego Comic-Con

Plant (born 1952) was a comics and illustrated books enthusiast from San Jose, California, who throughout his high school years bought and sold back issue comic books through ads in fanzines such as Rocket's Blast/ComicCollector. In 1968 he co-founded Seven Sons Comic Shop with five friends, John Barrett, Jim Buser, Mike Nolan, Frank Scadina, and Tom Tallmon, in San Jose. Selling Seven Sons within a year, Plant along with Barrett, Buser, and Dick Swan later opened another San Jose-based comics shop called Comic World in 1969.

In 1970 Plant founded Bud Plant, Inc. as a mail order company specializing in underground comix. (His Holly Drive address appears as the publishing address of the first issue of Promethean Enterprises in 1969.) In 1971, Plant and five friends spent the summer dealing comics at conventions in Houston, New York, Dallas, San Diego, Miami, Boston, and Washington, D.C.

Plant had met direct market pioneer Phil Seuling at the New York ComicCon in 1970. Nolan had met Seuling at the New York convention the year before, and he convinced Barrett, Plant, and Scadina to drive around the country during the summer of '70 with their stash of comix for sale the next year. Scadina canceled at the last minute and Nolan recruited his co-worker Larry Strawther, a fellow sportswriter at the Redwood City Tribune, as a replacement. (Strawther would later go on to be a writer-producer on TV shows like Happy Days, Laverne & Shirley, Night Court, and MXC: Most Extreme Elimination Challenge.) The foursome traveled around the country in Barrett's pick-up tuck with a shell, attending cons in Oklahoma City, Cincinnati, New York and Houston;. In New York they became good friends with Seuling. They repeated the journey in 1971, with Dick Swann joining them this time. In late 1973 Seuling called Plant to inform him that he had just cut a deal to ship Archie, DC, Marvel, and Warren comic books from a new distribution center in Sparta, Illinois. Seuling offered the West Coast region to Plant, but Plant turned him down, preferring then to concentrate on the proliferating underground comix market.

=== Publishing ===
Plant entered the publishing field in 1969 as one of the three publishers, along with Al Davoren and Jim Vadeboncoeur, Jr., of Promethean Enterprises—a fanzine that attempted to straddle the comic/comix boundary. (Promethean Enterprises lasted from 1969 to 1974.) In 1972, Plant took over the publishing responsibilities of the fanzine Anomaly from Jan Strnad who had published three issues since 1969. Plant published issue #4 of Anomaly, evolving it into an underground comic.

As part of his retailing enterprise Comics & Comix (see below), in 1974 Plant co-published one issue of the underground/sword and sorcery hybrid Barbarian Killer Funnies; moving from there to the similarly themed The First Kingdom, written and illustrated by Jack Katz. (Under various publishing names, Plant published 24 issues of The First Kingdom, from 1974 to 1986.) Comics & Comix also published three issues of Jim Pinkoski's Spaced in 1974–1976; two issues of Dan O'Neill's Comics and Stories in 1975; and two issues of Alfredo Alcala's Magic Carpet in 1977–1978.

Around 1978, Plant was approached by Wendy & Richard Pini about publishing Elfquest, but he turned the couple down, as he was getting out of the comics publishing business. (The Pinis later successfully self-published their project.)

From 1980 to 1985, Plant's retail shop Comics & Comix also published the industry trade journal Telegraph Wire.

==== Titles published ====
- Promethean Enterprises (5 issues, 1969–1974)
- Anomaly #4 (Nov. 1972) – taking over from Jan Strnad
- Barbarian Killer Funnies (1974) – by Tom Bird
- The First Kingdom (24 issues, 1974–1986) – by Jack Katz
- Spaced (3 issues, 1974–1976) – by Jim Pinkoski
- Dan O'Neill's Comics and Stories vol. 2 (2 issues, 1975) – by Dan O'Neill; picked up from Company & Sons
- Magic Carpet (2 issues, 1977–1978) – by Alfredo Alcala
- Telegraph Wire (24 issues, 1980–Dec./Jan. 1985) – trade journal

=== Comics & Comix ===
In August 1972, while still an undergraduate at San Jose State University, Plant co-founded what became the comics retailer Comics & Comix in Berkeley, California, with John Barrett and Plant's housemate Robert Beerbohm. In 1973 Comics & Comix helped host the first Bay Area comics convention, Berkeleycon 73, in the Pauley Ballroom in the ASUC Building on the University of California, Berkeley campus. At that show, Comics & Comix acquired over 4,000 Golden Age comic books owned by Tom Reilly. The phenomenal sales of the Reilly collection enabled Comics & Comix to open more retail locations, first in San Francisco (May 1973), on Columbus Avenue (down from the North Beach area on the way to Fisherman's Wharf), and later in San Jose and Sacramento, making it the first comic book chain store in America.

=== Expansion ===
In the early 1980s Plant supplied product to Destiny Distributors, a sub-distributor based in Seattle and Vancouver, started by Phil Pankow (which was acquired by Diamond in 1990). In 1982, Plant bought out regional rival Charles Abar Distribution, based in Belmont, California.

The year 1985 brought two important developments in the distribution industry, the bankruptcy of Seuling's Sea Gate Distributors (Seuling himself had died in 1984), and the failure of Plant's West Coast rival Pacific Comics (which by that point was also a large independent comics publisher). Plant and Midwestern distributor Capital City Distributors opened "an expanded facility in Seagate's old space in Sparta, Illinois, alongside [Pacific's old] printing plant". In 1987, Plant acquired Alternate Realities Distributing, Inc., based in Denver, Colorado, a wholesale distribution operation run by Nanette Rozanski.

By 1988, Plant dominated distribution of comics in the West Coast, finally fulfilling Seuling's 1974 vision.

=== Sale to Diamond ===
In the summer of 1988, Steve Geppi of Diamond Comics Distribution bought Plant's distribution warehouses, allowing Diamond to go "national", "thereby assuming control of "40 percent of the direct-sales market".

Later in 1988, Plant also sold Comics & Comix.

=== Back to basics ===
After divesting himself of his distribution and brick-and-mortar retail businesses, Plant maintained a mail-order (and now Internet) presence in art books, trade paperbacks, and rare books. Plant is known for the colorful titles of his sales catalogs:

- Bud Plant's Incredible Catalog (1987–1996)
- Bud Plant Illustrated Books (1987–2005) – out-of-print/rare book catalog
- Bud Plant's Comic Art Update (1993–2002)
- Bud Plant Comic Art Wholesale Catalog (Winter 1996)
- Bud Plant's Incorrigible Catalog – pinup art, erotic comic books, etc. (Winter 2001–2002)
- Bud Plant's Incredible Update (2003–present) – continuation of Comic Art Update

=== Realignment ===
On July 5, 2011, Plant announced plans to sell his mail-order business and retire. Then in April 2012 (after failing to find a buyer) he announced plans to downsize (eliminating print catalogs) but continue operations.

After just under a year with no catalogs but email announcements, and just three people on staff, he began expanding again, beginning with color flyers. By 2013 Plant was back to doing smaller full-color bi-monthly catalogs. He also hired back several long-time employees, including Todd Wulf and LaDonna Padgett, who had been with him since before the wholesale business sold to Diamond in 1988.

The company exhibited at the first 48 editions of San Diego Comic-Con, stopping in 2018. Plant was a special guest at the 2019 San Diego Comic-Con, as part of their celebration of the dealers and fans who were at the first Comic-Con in 1970. He spoke on two panels. He was also a guest at the 2019 San Diego Comic Fest and served on two panels there as well.

As of April 2020, Bud Plant was back to producing bi-monthly full-color catalogs, weekly new item emails, and periodic special emails for various categories, such as out-of-print, adult, and clearance sales. The company had a staff of seven full-time employees, including Wulf and Padgett, and remained in the same warehouse of 34 years. 2020 was Plant's 50th year of operation.

== Awards ==
- 1985: Named as one of the honorees by DC Comics in the company's 50th anniversary publication Fifty Who Made DC Great.
- Plant was the recipient of an Inkpot Award at the 1994 San Diego Comic-Con.
- In 2026, Plant was selected for inclusion in the Eisner Hall of Fame.

== See also ==
- List of book distributors
