= Comics and Comix =

Comic Book Retailer and Publisher

- Company type: Private
- Industry: Comics; Pop Culture; Collectables
- Genre: Retail, Publishing
- Founded: Berkeley, California, U.S., 1972
- Founder: Bud Plant, Robert Beerbohm, John Barrett
- Fate: defunct (2004)
- Headquarters: Berkeley, California, U.S.
- Number of locations: 9
- Area served: Northern California
- Key people: Dick Swan, Jim Buser, Scott Maple,
- Products: Comics

Comics and Comix Co. (C&C) was a comic book retailer based in Berkeley, California, that for a short time also had a publishing division. The company was founded by Bud Plant, Robert Beerbohm, and John Barrett. Comics & Comix operated from 1972 to 2004. At its peak, C&C had nine retail locations, making it the first comic book chain store in America.

== History ==
In late August 1972, while still an undergraduate at San Jose State University, Bud Plant co-founded Comics & Comix with John Barrett (1950–2001) and Plant's housemate Robert Beerbohm. The store's first location was on Telegraph Avenue in Berkeley, California.

In 1973 Comics & Comix helped organize the first Bay Area comics convention, Berkeleycon 73, in the Pauley Ballroom in the ASUC Building on the University of California, Berkeley campus. At that show, C&C acquired over 4,000 Golden Age comic books owned by Tom Reilly. The phenomenal sales of the Reilly collection enabled Comics & Comix to open more retail locations, first in San Francisco (May 1973), on Columbus Avenue (down from the North Beach area on the way to Fisherman's Wharf), and later in San Jose and Sacramento, making it the first comic book chain store in America.

In 1974, Comics & Comix organized Berkeleycon 74, also held at Berkeley's Pauley Ballroom. A 48-page comic called Tales from the Berkeley Con, co-published by local underground comics publishers Rip Off Press and Last Gasp, was produced to promote the convention.

Founding partner Beerbohm left the company in 1975, soon opening his own store, Best of Two Worlds, in San Francisco.

As part of his distribution business, Plant supplied Comics & Comix with product while also handling distribution for much of the West Coast.

In 1987, Barrett founded the Wonderful World of Comics Convention (later known as WonderCon), which was first held at the Oakland Convention Center.

In 1988, Plant sold Comics & Comix to the company's comptroller; who ran it successfully until c. 1996. Retailer Ross Rojek acquired the chain of stores in 1996, during the speculation downturn, and by 2004 only two Comics & Comix stores remained open, in Berkeley and Sacramento. In April 2004, Rojek was indicted on eight counts of mail fraud, two counts of wire fraud, and three counts of money laundering, and was accused of cheating 112 investors out of $2.5 million. At that point, the two remaining Comics & Comics locations closed down; Rojek was sentenced to more than six years in federal prison in November 2004.

== Publishing ==
Comics & Comix operated as a comics publisher from 1974 to 1978. The company ventured into publishing with Jack Katz's underground/sword and sorcery hybrid The First Kingdom. The company published 6 issues of that title until 1977, at which point it was continued under various publishing names by Plant until 1986. Comics & Comix also published comics by Jim Pinkoski, Dan O'Neill, and Alfredo Alcala.

From 1980 to 1985, Comics & Comix also published the industry trade journal the Telegraph Wire (named after the street of their flagship location). Under store employee Diana Schutz starting circa 1981, the Telegraph Wire blossomed into a bimonthly, 32-page newsletter which was modeled on The Comics Journal, with each issue containing an interview, reviews, news, and ads.

=== Titles published ===
- The First Kingdom (6 issues, 1974–1977) — by Jack Katz; later issues published solely by Bud Plant
- Spaced (3 issues, 1974–1976) — by Jim Pinkoski
- Dan O'Neill's Comics and Stories vol. 2 (2 issues, 1975) — by Dan O'Neill; picked up from Company & Sons
- Magic Carpet (2 issues, 1977–1978) — by Alfredo Alcala
- Telegraph Wire (24 issues, 1980–Dec./Jan. 1985) — trade journal
