= Big Bang Comics =

American comic book series

- Cover of the first series trade paperback.

Publication information
- Publisher: Caliber Press; Image Comics
- Schedule: (Caliber): Quarterly (Image Comics): Monthly
- Format: (Caliber) Limited series (Image) Ongoing series
- Publication date: (Caliber); Spring 1994 – May 1995 (Image); May 1996 – Jan. 2001
- No. of issues: (Caliber): 5 (Image): 35
- Main characters: The Beacon; Dr. Weird; Knight Watchman; Protoplasman; Thunder Girl; Ultiman

Creative team
- Written by: Gary Carlson; Chris Ecker; Edward DeGeorge; Stan Timmons; Bill Fugate; Jeff Weigel
- Artist(s): Chris Ecker; Randy Zimmerman; Mark Lewis; Stan Timmons; Mike Obre; Steve Adams; Bart Schmitz; Bill Fugate; Stephanie Sanderson; Jeff Weigel; Ben Torres
- Editor: Gary Carlson

Collected editions
- Your Big Book of Big Bang Comics: ISBN 978-1887279888

Big Bang Comics is an American comic book anthology series, designed to be an homage to Golden Age and Silver Age comics. Most stories in Big Bang Comics take place either on "Earth-A" during the 1960s, or on "Earth-B" during the 1940s, featuring characters such as Ultiman, Thunder Girl, and Dr. Weird.

Big Bang Comics first appeared in 1994, with a five-issue limited series (numbered #1–4 and #0), published by Caliber Comics. A second series lasting 35 issues, set in the Image Universe, was published by Image Comics from 1996 to 2001.

== Publication history ==
Gary Carlson was exposed to Dr. Weird (who originally appeared in the fanzine Star Studded Comics #1 in 1963) in one of the character's earliest collected appearances, Comic Crusader Storybook #1 (Al Greim, 1977), in a story by Howard Keltner and Dennis Fujitake. The Comic Crusader Storybook was a trade paperback fanzine anthology which included short stories featuring the work of many independent artists and writers. In 1994, Carlson co-created the Big Bang anthology series, alongside artist/writer Chris Ecker. In the 1990s Carlson wrote Berzerker for Caliber Press; one of the first canonical appearances of a Big Bang Comics character was by the Knight Watchman in Berzerker #1 (Feb. 1993). In 1993, Carlson and Edward DeGeorge acquired all rights to Dr. Weird from Howard Keltner, eventually folded him into the Big Bang universe and making him the only character with a genuine pedigree.

=== Image Comics ===
Through 2005, Image Comics published 35 issues of Big Bang Comics set in the Image Universe, followed by seven one-shot comics.

=== Big Bang Presents ===
As of the 2010s, Carlson self-publishes Big Bang Presents. Like its predecessor series Big Bang Comics, this is an anthology featuring a rotating cast of new and established characters in a self-contained fictional universe, written by Carlson and drawn by Ecker and various other artists. The company has also begun reprinting earlier comics in trade paperback form through Pulp 2.0 press.

== Big Bang characters ==
Some of the iconic characters in the Big Bang Universe include:

- The Beacon
- Dr. Weird
- Knight Watchman
- Protoplasman
- Thunder Girl
- Ultiman

Superhero teams in the Big Bang Universe include the Round Table of America, the Knights of Justice, the Pantheon of Heroes, and the Whiz Kids.

== Metafictional imprints ==
To give more depth to the various characters, in the world of Big Bang Comics, several invented publishing imprints were created which supposedly existed in the Golden Age and the Silver Age (a device later used by Amalgam Comics).

All of these false covers appeared on the reverse of the Caliber Press limited series issues in scaled-down shots, and again as full-page replicas in Big Bang #0.

| Title | Description |
|---|---|
| Deductive Comics | A tribute to Detective Comics, right down to the lettering. This is supposedly where Knight Watchman entered the Big Bang world along with his sidekick, Kid Galahad. |
| Hi Octane Comics | The supposed introduction of Ultiman, but this was simply a retitled cover of Big Bang #2 of Caliber Press, using the lettering style of Action Comics. |
| Jolt Comics | The introduction of the Golden-Age Blitz (Mack Snelling) and a tribute to Flash Comics. |
| Policeman Comics | The supposed starting point of Protoplasman, inspired by Police Comics where Plastic Man began his superhero career. |
| Quantity Comics | Mentioned as being the umbrella-group for Policeman Comics. This itself is a pastiche of the Golden Age Quality Comics. |
| Red Hot Comics | A comic that starred Dr. Stellar, Vita-Man, Robo-Hood, The Badge and Stars 'n' Stripes. Red Hot Comics drew the most attention after fans saw the blown-up image in Big Bang #0. Many requests were sent in to see Robo-Hood and Vita-Man in action. Stars 'n' Stripes, however, have never appeared since. |
| Star Studded Comics | Mentioned as being the origin of Dr. Weird. The title suggests Star Spangled Comics, although the lettering seems to be a reference to All Star Comics. |
| Thunder Girl Adventures | Thunder Girl's solo title, based loosely on the old Fawcett Comics character Mary Marvel, with elements of Wonder Girl thrown in. |

== In other media ==
A TV movie named Knights of Justice was made in 2000. Although it featured the Golden Age versions of Ultiman and Thunder Girl and used the name of the company's Golden Age superteam, the team also included Knight Watchman and a heroine called Masker (who appeared in BB #21), both of whom are exclusively Silver Age heroes in the published version of the universe. The team's mission was to defeat a supervillain and prove their usefulness to the President or face being disbanded.

The film is loosely based on the hyperactive Saturday-morning shows of the 1970s that combined special effects with live action, yielding a clearly Silver Age feel to the action.

=== Big Bang Comics RPG ===
A pen-and-paper role-playing game has also been released for Big Bang Comics (Pisces All Media, 2006). The Big Bang Comics RPG uses a streamlined version of the d20 System.

== See also ==
- America's Best Comics
