= The Texas-Israeli War: 1999 =

1974 novel by Jake Saunders and Howard Waldrop

- First edition
- Authors: Jake Saunders; Howard Waldrop
- Cover artist: Dean Ellis
- Language: English
- Genre: Science fiction, War
- Publisher: Ballantine Books
- Publication date: 1974
- Publication place: United States
- Media type: Print (paperback)
- Pages: 209 pp
- ISBN: 0-345-27736-8

The Texas-Israeli War: 1999 is a 1974 science-fiction war novel by Jake Saunders and Howard Waldrop. Several early chapters appeared in Galaxy in 1973 under the title A Voice and Bitter Weeping.

== Backstory ==
In 1983, the nations of the world signed the Oslo Disarmament Treaty, severely limiting the size of nuclear arsenals. However, this led to a proliferation of biological and chemical weapons.

By the early 1990s, a fanatical Irish nationalist government led by Wyatt Harris had declared war on the UK, conquered Northern Ireland, and expelled the Protestants from that region. In August 1992, Irish commandos introduced LSD into the water supply of much of the UK. Under the influence of the drug, the Prime Minister and Parliament ordered the use of nuclear weapons against Ireland and her allies, South Africa and China. The Commonwealth backed the UK in the emerging World War III, and the United States joined the British side after Chinese missiles, targeting the Canadian Great Plains, struck inside the US. By this time, widespread biological warfare was in effect, with missile-borne pathogens doing extensive damage to both agriculture and human populations. One week after the beginning of the war, China invaded the Soviet Union. Israel remained the only major neutral great power. By the end of 1992, half of the world's population was dead; 90% had perished from plague and famine by 1994.

Later, Texas declared independence from the United States as the Second Republic of Texas; due to Texas' large oil reserves and refineries, the U.S. saw its recovery as an important strategic objective. During negotiations in Oklahoma City, U.S. President Clairewood was kidnapped by Texas Rangers and held captive in Texas, while the United States languished under the heavy-handed but ineffective leadership of Vice President William Mallow. The war between the two nations continued; a Texan offensive into Louisiana in May 1999 was repulsed, but only after war crimes were committed by Texan forces operating under the command of the Sons of the Alamo, a radical paramilitary group.

== Plot summary ==
Sol Inglestein is the commander of a tank squadron of Israeli mercenaries fighting for the United States government, promised land for their efforts. Their Centurion tanks, which Sol had radically redesigned, are powered by nuclear reactors and armed with Gatling-style laser cannons. His squadron is ordered across the Red River into Texas to take part in an assault on the Dalworthington metro area; his mercenaries dance the horah as they wait to cross the river. Encountering only light resistance, they push towards Dallas. Sol leads the column in his tank, the Wrath of Jehovah.

Master Sergeant William Brown, a Vietnam veteran commanding an armored car, is part of General Wilson's Union army simultaneously advancing on Dallas from Texarkana. Separated from his column's heavy armor when the Texans dynamite the dam holding back Lake Ray Hubbard, his contingent comes under heavy artillery fire as they near Dallas. With only his car remaining, Brown sights the source of the fire: a Texan heavy cruiser, the Judge Roy Bean, brought up a canal to Dallas.

Meanwhile, Sol's tank squadron, alerted by Brown, ambushes and sinks the ship. Sol is then given a new assignment: he will lead a push into the heart of Texas to rescue President Clairewood. Guided by Major Mistra, a Texas National Guard officer who defected to the Union, Sol will lead a column masquerading as Texan mercenary armor. Sol's girlfriend, Myra Kalan, also a tank commander, will separately lead the remaining Centurions south. Splevins, the CIA agent conducting the briefing, warns them that President Mallow's agents may try to sabotage the mission. Shortly thereafter, a squad of soldiers attempts to assassinate Sol and Myra.

Sol's brigade, along with Brown, departs for Fort Deaf Smith, a former prison near Crystal City where Clairewood is being held. En route they encounter a band of Indians with the Volkswagen logo painted on their chests. Mistra convinces the Texan units guarding Crystal City that they are Israeli mercenaries fighting on the Texan side, and they are ushered into the Fort to refuel and await new assignment.

Myra's tanks follow a parallel route to Sol's. They are nearly struck by a tornado and are attacked by a Texan infantry patrol, who are dispatched by one of the tanks. They arrive in position in the hills above Fort Deaf Smith, but Myra is captured while scouting. Despite playing the innocent she is tortured by the Sons of the Alamo chief at the fort, Kiburn, but is rescued from this mistreatment by the Texan commanding officer, General Fowler.

Meanwhile, General Wilson's Union forces have been advancing south towards Houston to draw the Texans away from Crystal City. Increased pressure from Cuban amphibious landings at Galveston and on Padre Island cause the Texan armored brigades to begin hurried preparations to leave Fort Deaf Smith.

At this point, Sol's forces strike. Faking a chemical weapons alert, they destroy the few remaining planes of the Texan Air Force and break into the prison where Clairewood and Myra are being held. Kiburn is killed, and as they escape Fowler destroys one of their tanks but he is also killed. Mistra is shot during the escape. As they leave, the mercenaries destroy much of the remaining Texan armor.

The column evades further Texan forces and makes its way to Albuquerque, from where Clairewood returns to Pittsburgh, the American capital, unannounced until Mallow encounters him in the President's office. Clairewood celebrates with Sol, Myra, and Brown over bottles of Coca-Cola, no longer manufactured in the United States but now imported from Israel.

== Critical reaction ==
A 2011 review in the Texas-based Jewish Herald-Voice claims the novel provides "an intriguing counterpoint to many of the assumptions that prevail in the historical study of Texas Jewry" and so this "profoundly unhistorical book thus serves a useful historical purpose". A 2013 review in Foreign Policy described the novel as "solid Grade B sci-fi: punchy, page-turning prose with lots of action and a fair bit of sex" while calling it "one of the most bizarre SF books ever written".
