= A Dozen Tough Jobs =

1989 novella by Howard Waldrop

- Author: Howard Waldrop
- Language: English
- Genre: Science fiction
- Publisher: Mark V. Ziesing
- Publication date: April 1989
- Publication place: United States
- Media type: Print (Hardcover)
- Pages: 135
- ISBN: 0-929480-02-3
- OCLC: 20408345

A Dozen Tough Jobs is a novella by Howard Waldrop which retells the Twelve Labors of Hercules in the Depression-era American South. It was a Nebula Award finalist.
