= Pantheon of Heroes =

- Pantheon of Heroes, art by Dave Cockrum.

Publication information
- Publisher: Big Bang Comics
- First appearance: Big Bang Comics #12

In-story information
- Base(s): Empire City
- Member(s): Angelfish, Anti-Matter Lad, Brain Boy, Butterfly Queen, Clone Boy, Devil Boy, Dragon Fist, Galactic Lad, Golden Girl, Ghost Girl, Gravity Girl, Jupiter Boy, Kid Warlock, Laughing Boy, Nature Boy, Photon, Snowstar, Tele-Girl, and Ultragirl

The Pantheon of Heroes (a.k.a. the Pantheon of Super Heroes) is a fictional team of superheroes, based on the Legion of Super-Heroes. The Pantheon first appeared in Big Bang Comics #12, with the cover for the first story drawn by former Legion artist Dave Cockrum. The Pantheon of Heroes appeared in Big Bang #12, #14 and #18, during the "TimeBomber Saga", guest-starring Erik Larsen's Savage Dragon. Big Bang's Mark Lewis designed some of the earliest characters, as well as the Butterfly Queen which appeared slightly later.

== Fictional team history ==
The Pantheon is a team in the 30th century, inspired by Ultragirl and based in Ultiman's hometown - Empire City. Their headquarters was a space craft and later a citadel. Each year, they held auditions for new members. They have time traveling technology (first "Time Pills" then "Time Belts"), allowing Ultragirl to join the group. She later came to the group via "time cube".

== Members ==
- Angelfish
- Anti-Matter Lad - Based on Wildfire and Mano.
- Brain Boy - He has superhuman intelligence (hence his over-sized head). He is based on Brainiac 5 and Evolvo Lad.
- Butterfly Queen - She is based on Insect Queen.
- Clone Boy - Dubba has pale blue-skin and antennae. He can clone himself and others. He is based on Chameleon Boy, Duplicate Boy, and Duo Damsel.
- Devil Boy - He can contact the dead via holding a seance. He is mentioned but not seen.
- Dragon Fist - Formerly known as Combat Kid, he is a martial artist, based on Karate Kid and Iron Fist.
- Galactic Lad - Noa Zark is able to increase his super strength to "level 10". He is based on Ultra Boy.
- Golden Girl
- Ghost Girl - Mariah Vesper was first able to project her "soul-self". Then, after being blasted with a ray gun, she is denied entrance into the afterlife. She becomes undead and is intangible. She is based on Phantom Girl, Deadman, and Doctor Strange.
- Gravity Girl - She can manipulate weight and density. She is based on Star Boy and Light Lass.
- Jupiter Boy - He is a "cathode giant" with electric powers. He was a founding member and died while saving the universe. He is based on Mon-El, Superboy and Lightning Lad.
- Kid Warlock has magical powers.
- Laughing Boy - Shemp Babbit has emotion manipulation, but when he does so he gets the appropriate facial expression. He is the Phaethon's "class clown" and is based on Psycho-Pirate and Psyche.
- Nature Boy - An ally that said to have died in 2988. It's unknown that he actually became a member. He is based on Chlorophyll Kid.
- Photon - She was first known as "Lamp Lass".
- Snowstar - She has cold manipulation usually manifested as blizzards and is based on Polar Boy.
- Tele-Girl - A mind-reading member that once visited the 20th century. She is based on Saturn Girl.
- Ultragirl - Thanks to being exposed to a radioactive meteor, she gained Ultraman-like powers and was the inspiration for the group. She is based on Superboy and Supergirl.
