= Howard Waldrop =

American author of science fiction (1946–2024)

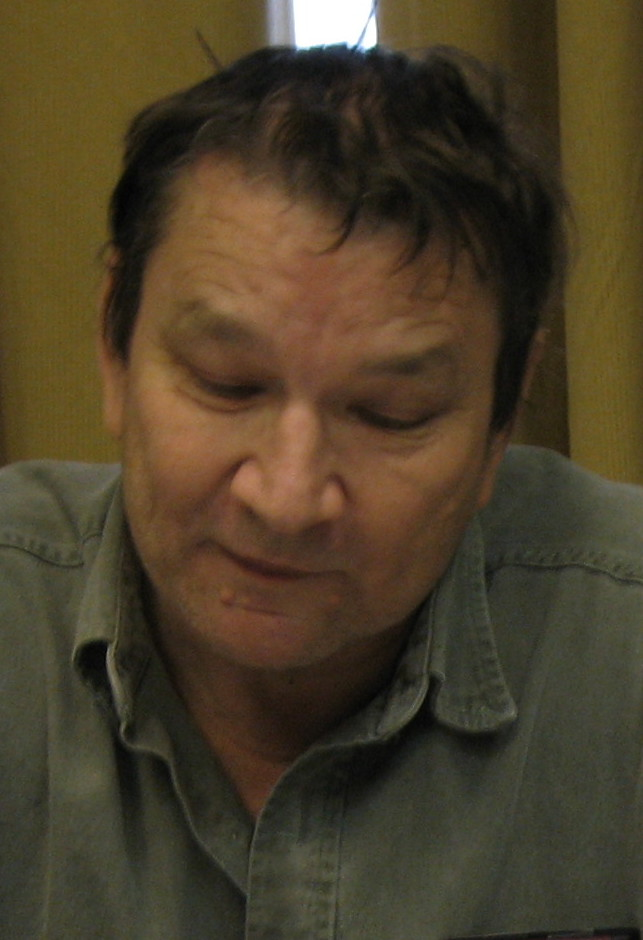
- Waldrop in 2007
- Born: September 15, 1946; Houston, Mississippi, U.S.
- Died: January 14, 2024 (aged 77); Austin, Texas, U.S.
- Occupation: Fiction writer
- Writing career
- Genre: Science fiction
- Notable works: "The Ugly Chickens", "Night of the Cooters"
- Notable awards: Nebula Award (1980); World Fantasy Award (1981)

Howard Waldrop (September 15, 1946 – January 14, 2024) was an American science fiction author who worked primarily in short fiction. He received the World Fantasy Award for Life Achievement in 2021.

== Early life ==
Born in Houston, Mississippi, Waldrop spent most of his life in Texas. He moved to Washington state for several years, but returned to Austin.

As a child, he corresponded with A Game of Thrones author George R. R. Martin about their shared love of comic books. He was an avid fly fisherman. He was a member of the Turkey City Writer's Workshop, attended the Rio Hondo Writing Workshop, and taught at the Clarion Workshop.

== Career ==
Waldrop was a frequent attendee of ArmadilloCon, the local science fiction convention held annually in Austin. He was the Toastmaster at the inaugural ArmadilloCon #1 (1979) and again at ArmadilloCon #29 (2007); he was Guest of Honor at ArmadilloCon #5 (1983).

Waldrop was one of three writer Guests of Honor at the 1995 World Fantasy Convention held in Baltimore and at Readercon 15 held in Burlington, Massachusetts, in 2003.

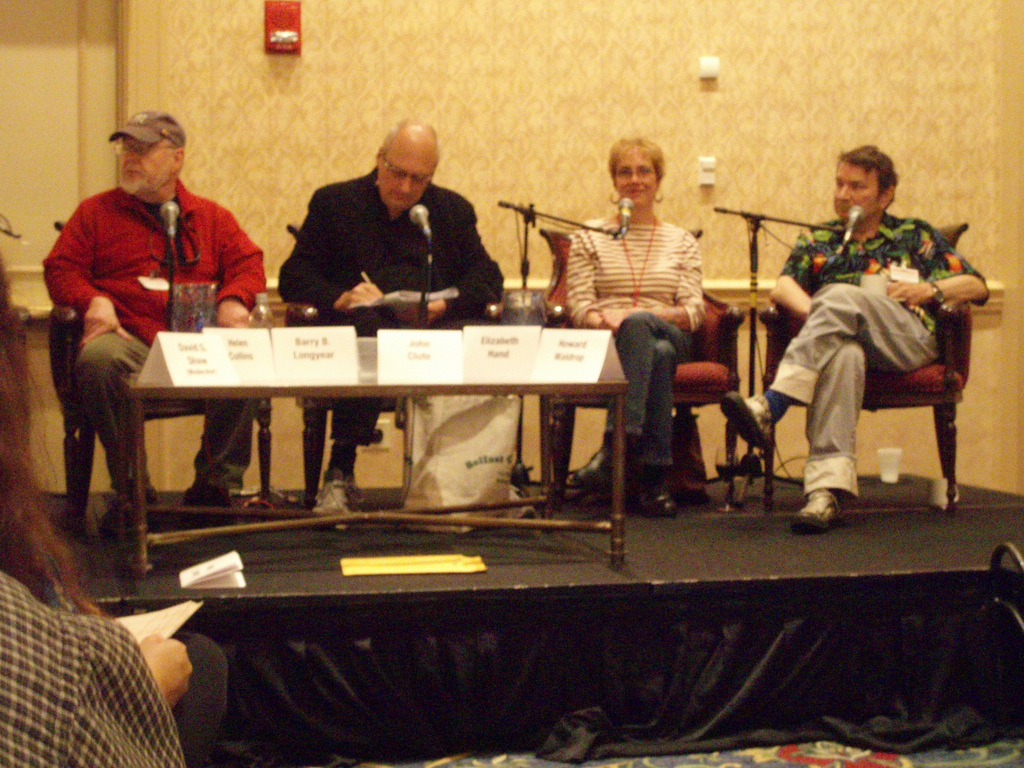
Barry Longyear, John Clute, Elizabeth Hand and Howard Waldrop at Readercon in Boston, 2009

Waldrop was Professional Writer Guest of Honor at Loscon 46 in Los Angeles, California, in 2019. In 2004 he started writing movie reviews with Lawrence Person for Locus Online.

Waldrop died from a stroke in Austin, on January 14, 2024, at the age of 77.

== Style ==
Waldrop's stories combine elements such as alternative history, American popular culture, the American South, old movies (and character actors), classical mythology, and rock 'n' roll music. His style is sometimes obscure or elliptical: Night of the Cooters is a pastiche of H. G. Wells' The War of the Worlds told from the perspective of a small town Texas sheriff (a homage to Slim Pickens) who faces a Martian cylinder crashing down near his town; "Heirs of the Perisphere" involves robotic Disney characters waking up in the far future; "Fin de Cyclé" describes the Dreyfus affair from the perspective of bicycle enthusiasts.

Waldrop's work is frequently out-of-print, though still available for sale online; several of his books have been reprinted in omnibus editions.

Several of his stories have been nominated for the genre's awards; "The Ugly Chickens" — about the extinction of the dodo — won a Nebula Award for best novelette in 1980, and also a World Fantasy Award for Short Fiction in 1981; this is perhaps his best known work. His collection Night of the Cooters: More Neat Stories won the Locus Award for Best Collection in 1992. In 2021, he won the World Fantasy Award for Life Achievement.

At least three novels remained unfinished/unpublished: I, John Mandeville, The Search for Tom Purdue and The Moone World.

== Film adaptations ==
Three of his stories ("The Ugly Chickens", "Mary Margaret Road Grader", and "Night of the Cooters"), have been adapted to film, while George R. R. Martin has signed on as producer for an animated adaptation of A Dozen Tough Jobs.

== Bibliography ==
=== Novels and novellas ===
- The Texas-Israeli War: 1999 (with Jake Saunders, 1974) (Ballantine mass market, 1986, ISBN 0-345-33994-0)
- Them Bones (Ace, 1984, ISBN 0-441-80557-4)
- A Dozen Tough Jobs (novella) (Mark V Ziesing hardcover, 1989, ISBN 0-929480-01-5)

=== Short story collections ===
- Howard Who? (Doubleday hardcover, 1986). Reprinted as 2006 trade paperback from Small Beer Press, ISBN 1-931520-18-6
- All About Strange Monsters of the Recent Past (Ursus Imprints, signed/numbered/slipcased hardcover, 1987)
- Strange Things in Close-Up (Arrow Books, 1989). Includes both Howard Who? and All About Strange Monsters of the Recent Past.
- Strange Monsters of the Recent Past (Ace mass market, 1991, ISBN 0-441-16069-7). Includes both All About Strange Monsters of the Recent Past and the novella A Dozen Tough Jobs.
- Night of the Cooters: More Neat Stories (Zeising/Ursus Imprints hardcover, 1990). Reprinted as Ace mass market, 1993, ISBN 0-441-57473-4. The 1991 Arrow Books edition also includes the novella A Dozen Tough Jobs.
- Going Home Again (Eidolon trade paperback, 1997, ISBN 0-9586864-0-8)
- Dream Factories and Radio Pictures (e-book, 2001 at ELECTRICSTORY; printed trade paperback from Wheatland Press, 2003)
- Custer's Last Jump and Other Collaborations (Golden Gryphon hardcover, 2003, ISBN 1-930846-13-4). Includes Waldrop's collaborations with Steven Utley, Bruce Sterling, Leigh Kennedy, George R. R. Martin, and others.
- Heart of Whitenesse (Subterranean Press, hardcover, 2005, ISBN 1-59606-018-2)
- Things Will Never be the Same: Selected Short Fiction 1980-2005 ("best of" collection from Old Earth Books, 2007, ISBN 1-882968-36-0, trade paperback; ISBN 1-882968-35-2 for 300-copy limited edition hardcover)
- Other Worlds, Better Lives: Selected Long Fiction 1989-2003 (Old Earth Books, 2008, ISBN 1-882968-38-7, trade paperback; ISBN 1-882968-37-9 for 300-copy signed/limited edition hardcover)
- Horse of A Different Color: Selected Stories (2008–2013) Small Beer Press trade paperback, ISBN 978-1-61873-073-2)
- H'ard Starts: The Early Waldrop (Subterranean Press, 2023, ISBN 978-1-64524-116-4 for 750-copy signed/limited edition hardcover)

=== Selected short stories ===
- "Thirty Minutes Over Broadway!" lead off story in Wild Cards I: Wild Cards, Bantam, 1986 (multiple volume ongoing series currently in print from Tor Books.)
- "Thin, On the Ground" in Cross Plains Universe, MonkeyBrain Books, 2006.
- "The Dead Sea-Bottom Scrolls" in Old Mars (anthology), Tor Books, 2013. Nominated for a Locus Award.
- "Ike at the Mike" (Omni, June 1982)

=== Chapbooks ===
- The Soul-Catcher (self-published, 1967)
- You Could Go Home Again (Cheap Street signed/numbered/tray cased very limited hardcover edition, 1993)
- Custer's Last Jump (with Steven Utley) (Ticonderoga Publications, 1996)
- Flying Saucer Rock and Roll (Cheap Street signed/numbered tray cased very limited hardcover edition, 2001)
- A Better World's in Birth! (Golden Gryphon, 2003)
- The Horse of a Different Color (You Rode In On)/The King of Where-I-Go (WSFA, 2006); saddle-stitched trade paperback given out to members of the 2005 Capclave, though not printed in time to be distributed there (not available/sold separately after publication)
