= Star Studded Comics =

Three different comics-related publications

Star Studded Comics is the name of three comics-related publications, including a comic from the Golden Age of Comics, a comics fanzine, and a modern comic homage to the previous.

== Cambridge House Publishers title ==
The first publication to use the name was published in 1945 by Cambridge House Publishers, and featured Captain Combat, Comandette, Red Rogue, Ghost Woman (the inspiration for the later Dark Horse Comics character, The Ghost), and several other characters.

In 1946, a comic of the same name was published in Canada by Superior Publishers Limited. Whether this was a reprint of Cambridge House's or not is uncertain.

== Fanzine ==
The second Star-Studded Comics was a fanzine that ran for 18 issues, from September 1963 to the summer of 1972. Published in the U.S. by the "Texas Trio" (Larry Herndon, Buddy Saunders, and Howard Keltner), it featured early amateur superhero comics drawn or written by George R. R. Martin, Grass Green, Jim Starlin, Roy Thomas, Sam Grainger, Alan Weiss, Dave Cockrum, Mike Vosburg, Biljo White, and Howard Keltner, among others, and featured the early appearances of Dr. Weird, Xal-kor the Human Cat, Wildman, and The Eye.

George R. R. Martin's prose story "Powerman vs. the Blue Barrier" won comic fandom's Alley Award in the amateur category. Earlier, in 1963, Buddy Saunders' cover artwork for the second issue also won an Alley Award in the amateur category. In 1967, the fanzine won three Alley Awards: Best All-Strip Fanzine, Best Fiction/Strip Fanzine, and Best Article on Comic Strip Material.

== Big Bang Comics title ==
The third Star Studded Comics is among the metafictional comics that tell the stories of the Big Bang Universe characters. As they featured Dr. Weird, however, this fictitious title is a clear homage to the 1960s fanzine, rather than an independent metafictional title.
