= Thunder Girl =

- Big Bang Comics #0, art by Alex Ross.

Publication information
- Publisher: Big Bang Comics
- First appearance: Big Bang Comics #2 (Summer 1994)
- Created by: Chris Ecker (writer); Sheldon Moldoff (artist)

In-story information
- Alter ego: Molly Wilson
- Team affiliations: Roundtable of America
- Abilities: Super strength; Invulnerability; Flight; Enhanced vision; Super speed; Great wisdom; Temporary power transference

Thunder Girl (AKA: Molly Wilson) is a superheroine in Big Bang Comics who first appeared in Big Bang Comics #2 (Summer 1994), created by Chris Ecker and Sheldon Moldoff. Thunder Girl is a pastiche of Mary Marvel of DC Comics.

== Fictional character biography ==
Molly Wilson is a young librarian who is transformed into Thunder Girl by shouting the magic word, "Alakazam!". She returns to normal by shouting this again. As Thunder Girl, Molly has the power to lift skyscrapers and fly at subsonic speeds. Sometimes, Thunder Girl refers to Molly in third person, suggesting that they are two different personalities.

=== The Criss-Cross Crisis ===
During the Criss-Cross Crisis, Thunder Girl discovered that her arch-foe, Dr. Hy Q. Binana (a super-intelligent monkey) was behind the clash of two worlds, but when the Crisis was over, Thunder Girl was trapped on the Silver Age Earth-A, unable to return home to the Golden Age Earth-B. She stayed on Earth-A as a member of the Roundtable of America.

=== Modern Age ===
In the Modern Age, Molly had upgraded her costume, and used her magic to keep herself young and beautiful. Her language had grown stronger, and she was dating Overdrive (previously Cyclone).

=== Powers and abilities ===
Molly Wilson is a superheroine who is powered by Nature herself. The primary power that she possesses is the ability to transform into her superpowered alter ego by saying the word "Alakazam" loudly. In her transformed state, Molly is incredibly strong and is able to lift skyscrapers. She is also able to fly and run at subsonic speeds. She is mostly invulnerable to damage, and possesses potent magical abilities. This allows her to retain her youth and beauty. She also possesses the "Wisdom of the Owl" which grants her a form of enhanced intellect, presumably heightening her memory and ability to process information. In addition, Molly is capable of using her transformative lightning bolts as unconventional weapons to strike opponents.
