= Richard F. Weingroff =

Richard F. Weingroff is an American writer and historian who serves as the official historian of the Federal Highway Administration (FHWA), an agency of the United States Department of Transportation (USDOT). He has written extensively on the history of the Interstate Highway System and U.S. transportation policy, with a particular focus on the legislative development of federal highway networks and urban infrastructure controversies such as the 1960s and 1970s freeway revolts in Washington, D.C.

== Early life and comic fandom ==
Weingroff was raised in Baltimore, Maryland. As a teenager in the 1960s, he participated in comic book fandom as a writer and publisher, being described as “one of the most intelligent commentators on the comic book scene of the day,” according to fandom expert Bill Schelly. In 1964, Weingroff won an Alley Award for best article in a fanzine, and he was among the approximately 50 attendees of the inaugural New York Comic Con.

Weingroff published the fanzine Slam-Bang and wrote articles for fan publications, including the Rocketeer Gossip column for Rocket's Blast Comicollector. Weingroff’s work focused on the Silver Age of Comic Books, including the early development of characters like Spider-Man by Stan Lee and Steve Ditko. Weingroff was known for providing in-depth analysis and thoughtful commentary, as well as offering some criticism, such as regarding the initially bulky appearance of Iron’s Man armor.

Weingroff studied at the University of Maryland, graduating with a Bachelor of Arts degree in English. After graduating from college, he served in the United States Air Force from 1968 to 1972. Stationed at Lackland Air Force Base in San Antonio, Texas, he worked as a reading skills instructor.

== History career ==
In 1973, Weingroff joined the Federal Highway Administration as a technical writer and information specialist, handling public inquiries, congressional correspondence, and agency speeches. In the 1980s, he began writing articles and historical overviews on American road development. His research addresses the U.S. highway systems, President Dwight D. Eisenhower's role in the Federal-Aid Highway Act of 1956, the Bureau of Public Roads, and local urban planning battles. The latter includes documenting how local citizen pushback and freeway revolts reshaped proposed highway routing through the District of Columbia. Weingroff’s works constitute the majority of FHWA's online "Highway History" repository.

Weingroff has been interviewed by media outlets about highway history, and his articles have served as reference material for news reports, academic research, legal filings, think tank assessments, and other materials discussing American history and infrastructure development. He has also contributed to books on transportation history, including Earl Swift's history of the Interstate System, The Big Roads. In addition, Weingroff has participated in media retrospectives on American urban transit and appeared on television documentary series such as the History Channel's Modern Marvels.

After serving as the agency's informal historian for several decades, Weingroff was officially appointed as the FHWA's agency historian in 2017 while continuing his duties as an information specialist.
