= Unknown Soldier (comics) =

Unknown Soldier, in comics, may refer to:

- Unknown Soldier (DC Comics), a DC Comics character
- Unknown Soldier (Ace Comics), an Ace Comics character

== See also ==
- Unknown Soldier (disambiguation)
