= Rocket's Blast Comicollector =

Comics advertising fanzine

- Cover of The Rocket's Blast and the Comicollector #29 (April 1964), the 1st issue of the merger. Art by Don Fowler (Buddy Saunders).
- Editor: The Comicollector: Jerry Bails; 1961–1962; Ronn Foss; 1962–1964; The Rocket's Blast; G. B. Love; 1961–1964; RBCC; G. B. Love; 1964–1974; James Van Hise; 1974–1983, 2002-2003
- Categories: Comic book Advertising; Strips; News; Reviews; Criticism
- Frequency: Monthly
- Publisher: G. B. Love (1964–1974); James Van Hise (1974–1981, 2002–2003); New Media Publishing (1981–1983)
- Total circulation: 3,300 (1979)
- First issue: April 1964 #29
- Final issue: June 1983 #153
- Company: S.F.C.A.
- Country: United States
- Based in: Miami, Florida
- Language: English

Rocket's Blast Comicollector (RBCC) was a comics advertising fanzine published from 1964 to 1983. The result of a merger with a similar publication, RBCC's purpose was to bring fans together for the purpose of adding to their comic book collections. It also proved to be a launching pad for aspiring comic book creators, many of whom corresponded and exchanged their work through RBCC, and published work in the fanzine as amateurs.

RBCC featured fan-generated art, original articles, and advertisements from comic book fans and dealers. Debuting in the pre-direct market era (before the proliferation of comics retailers), RBCC was one of the first and largest forums for buying and selling comics through the mail — often, the only way for fans to acquire back issues was through advertisements in RBCC. And, as ComicSource wrote, "RBCC was also an educational forum, with rich articles devoted to comics and creators long absent from the newsstands, such as EC Comics."

== History ==
=== Origins and merger ===
Inspired in part by the science-fiction fanzine/"adzine" The Fantasy Collector, in 1961, Jerry Bails, "the father of comics fandom," created The Comicollector as "a publication devoted primarily to the field" rather than the occasional advertisements of comics for sale that appeared in The Fantasy Collector. After publishing The Comicollector for a year, Bails passed it on to Ronn Foss.

Meanwhile, Miami-based comics and science fiction enthusiast G. B. Love had formed the Science Fiction and Comics Association (S.F.C.A.) and begun publishing his own fanzine, The Rocket's Blast (also debuting in 1961). In 1964 The Comicollector and The Rocket's Blast merged to form The Rocket's Blast and the Comicollector. The first issue of the new publication was #29 (continuing the numbering of The Rocket's Blast) and dated April 1964. (By about issue #50 [1966], the fanzine had shortened its title to Rocket's Blast Comicollector, and often just referred to itself as RBCC.)

=== Love era ===
Cartoonist Grass Green was an early and frequent contributor to RBCC, as was Buddy Saunders (later proprietor of the Lone Star Comics chain of comic book retailers), and Raymond L. Miller. Contributing writers during this era included science fiction author Howard Waldrop.

Between issues #25 (published Dec. 1963) and #50 (1966), the zine's circulation grew from about 200 to over 1,100. By RBCC #75 (1968), the circulation was 2,000. With issue RBCC #100 (1973), the circulation hit 2,250.

Between 1968 and 1973, comics artist Don Newton produced almost two dozen covers for the Rocket's Blast Comicollector. Newton's science fiction strip The Savage Earth ran from 1968 to 1970 in RBCC.

Joe Kubert serialized his strip "Danny Dreams" in the pages of RBCC in 1971.

From 1972–1975 comics historian James Van Hise serialized his (and Larry Bigman's) "Al Williamson Collector" in the pages of RBCC.

In the early 1970s, RBCC joined the WE Seal of approval program, a consumer protection/anti-mail fraud program.

Love published RBCC until 1974, when he moved from Miami to Houston, Texas, where he became involved with Star Trek fandom (and co-produced Houstoncon '74 and '75).

=== Van Hise era ===
With Love's departure (issue #113, published in Sept. 1974), long-time contributor James Van Hise took over the publishing duties of Rocket's Blast Comicollector. Van Hise introduced new features and columns to the zine, freshening its aesthetic for new audiences. Van Hise published four issues of RBCC under the auspices of the Science Fiction Comics Association in 1976–1977.

From 1976–1978, cartoonist Don Rosa serialized his adventure comic strip The Pertwillaby Papers in RBCC.

With the rise of the direct market system in the late 1970s and early 1980s, Rocket's Blast Comicollector was forced to shift its focus, as its readers could more easily find comics back issues in local comic shops rather than buying them through the mail. Competition from the likes of Comics Buyer's Guide pressured RBCC as well; after publishing on a monthly schedule for most of its existence, in 1978 RBCC went bimonthly. RRBC published four issues in 1979 (when their circulation hit a peak of 3,300), one issue in 1980, no issues in 1981, two issues in 1982, and its final issue, #153, in 1983. The last few issues were published by New Media Publications, which also published the fanzines Comics Feature and LOC (and published many works by editor Van Hise). RBCC's final issue was a parody issue titled "The Contentious Journal," which appeared to be satirizing one of its competitors, The Comics Journal.

=== 2002–2003 revival ===
In 2002–2003, James Van Hise temporarily revived The Rocket's Blast and the Comicollector, publishing four issues out of a new headquarters in Yucca Valley, California.

== Format ==
Starting out as a photocopied fanzine, RBCC eventually morphed into a magazine-size publication.

RRBC regular features included columns, articles, reviews, interviews, and cultural commentary; fan-generated art; a letter column (titled "Blasts from the Readers"); and classified comic book ads.

=== Columns ===
- "RB-CC Information Center" (later shortened to "Information Center") — question-and-answer feature originated by Raymond L. Miller dealing with readers' queries on all forms of pop entertainment, including comics, television, and movies. From 1974 to 1979, Don Rosa authored and illustrated the column (with Hilary Barta sometimes contributing illustrations).
- "Comic Collector's Comments" — news, reviews, and gossip by Howard P. Siegel, running from c. 1968–c. 1979
- "Comicopia" — R. C. Harvey feature on syndicated newspaper comic strips
- "Rocketeer Gossip" — a regular column from 1964–c. 1967 mostly written by Rick Weingroff, with occasional contributions by Paul Gambaccini
- "The Oddity Page" (later changed to "Oddities & Flashbacks") — c. 1967–1968, typically written by Raymond L. Miller
- "Eyeing the Egos" — late 1960s feature by Jan Strnad
- "The Keyhole" — Hamilton Benedict news & analysis feature debuting in 1973; later taken over by Gary Brown
- "Pulps Era of Adventure" — written by Keith Gebers and James Van Hise
- "A Twist of the Dial" — occasional column about the Golden Age of radio, usually by John Cooper
- "The EC Artist Collector" — occasional mid-70s column by James Van Hise, Larry Bigman, and others
- "Comics Commentary" — by James Van Hise (late 70s)

Other columns, most of which appeared a few times at most, were contributed by Bernie Bubnis, Phil Seuling, Paul Gambaccini, Calvin Castine, Tom Fagan, and Rick Weingroff.
