= Lone Star Comics =

Chain of comic book stores based in Texas

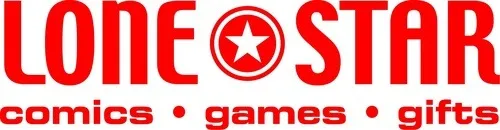
- Company type: Comics retailer
- Industry: Retail
- Founded: 1961 (as a mail order company); 1977 (as a brick-and-mortar store)
- Founder: Jake "Buddy" Saunders
- Defunct: 2013 (continues as online retailer)
- Headquarters: Dallas-Fort Worth metroplex, Texas, U.S.A.
- Products: Comics, collectibles
- Website: mycomicshop.com

Lone Star Comics was a chain of comic book stores located in the Dallas-Fort Worth area in north central Texas. The chain's offerings included comic books, action figures, gaming supplies, videos, and many other pop culture items.

Originally established as a quaint mail order company in 1961 by area fanzine publisher and entrepreneur Jake "Buddy" Saunders, Lone Star opened its first brick-and-mortar store in 1977, eventually operating a chain of nine retail outlets in the Dallas-Fort Worth metroplex. While still maintaining business locally, the company returned to its mail order roots in the early 2000s, this time as an online subscription and back-issue service. With the contraction of the overall economy beginning in 2008, the store sold off their various locations, closing the final one in the fall of 2013. The online store has expanded into a clearinghouse for sellers and buyers, mycomicshop.com.

== History ==
Saunders opened the first store in Arlington in 1977.

Lone Star was involved in the 1988 founding of the Harvey Awards, the first industry award voted on entirely by comics professionals. Lone Star employees tabulated the ballots for the first Harvey Awards, presented at the Chicago Comicon in July 1988.

Saunders closed the Irving location in 2008, the South Arlington location in 2011, and the Dallas store in October 2012.

In July 2013, Lone Star Comics sold off three of their five remaining stores, in Mesquite, Hurst, and Plano. In September 2013 Lone Star Comics sold off their remaining brick-and-mortar stores (the original Arlington location and the store in Fort Worth) to become solely an e-commerce business website.

== Former store locations ==
- Town East A location in the sublevel of Town East Mall below the central food court in the 1980s (unknown when this location closed.) The mall has been heavily renovated and this sublevel no longer exists.
- Central Arlington (sold September 2013; now Wild West Comics)
- Dallas (closed October 2012)
- Mesquite (sold July 2013; now Urban Legends)
- Hurst (sold July 2013; now Multiverse Games, Comics & Collectibles)
- Fort Worth (sold September 2013; now Wild West Comics)
- Plano (sold July 2013; now Collected Plano)
- Wichita Falls (closed some time before July 1998)
- Irving (closed February 24, 2008)
- South Arlington (closed June 2011)
