= Rory Root =

American comic book retailer

- Born: November 8, 1957; Oakland, California
- Died: May 19, 2008 (aged 50); Oakland, California
- Education: University of California, Berkeley
- Occupation: Comic book retailer

Rory D. Root (November 8, 1957 – May 19, 2008) was the owner of Comic Relief, a comic book retailer in Berkeley, California.

Comic Relief was one of the first stores to stock graphic novels, presaging their popularity by many years. Root also made a point of supporting self-publishers and minicomics artists. In 1993, Root was awarded the Will Eisner Spirit of Retailing Award in honor of his exemplary work in promoting the genre.

He influenced many in the comics field, including Eric Reynolds of Fantagraphics.

== Biography ==
Root attended the University of California, Berkeley, studying computer science, but dropped out of school just before graduating in order to pursue retailing. At first he managed a gaming store on Telegraph Avenue in Berkeley; after it closed he worked at Robert Beerbohm's comic book store, Best of Two Worlds, also on Telegraph Avenue.

Root and then-partner Michael Patchen opened Comic Relief on April 15, 1987, on University Avenue in Berkeley.

=== Death and demise of Comic Relief ===
Root had been dealing with ill health for some years before he died, after complications from hernia surgery. He told people in the years before his death that he had willed Comic Relief to long-time store manager Todd Martinez, but no will was ever found. Instead, the store and its assets went to Root's relatives, his siblings and mother.

Root's relatives had no prior retail experience and ran the store from afar. After Root's death, many long-time employees left and the store began to have cash flow problems. (Its 2005 move to a larger, more expensive, location, may have been a factor as well.), In December 2010, the store was basically bankrupt and was on the verge of closing its doors unless a new owner came in with a cash infusion. On February 14, 2011, the store went out of business.

== Legacy ==
In March 2011 it was announced that two separate comics retailers were opening to replace Comic Relief, one in its old location (Fantastic Comics) and one with the previous store's stock (The Escapist Comic Bookstore).

== In popular culture ==
Root was referenced in Jeff Smith's Bone, and his distinctive large cup of coffee was evoked in Neil Gaiman's Anansi Boys.

Due to their physical resemblance, Root had also been rumored to be the inspiration for Matt Groening's Comic Book Guy, although Root dismissed that, saying "I first met Matt long, long ago I was quite a bit thinner and beardless." Groening has also noted that Comic Book Guy was partly inspired by a clerk at the Los Angeles Amok book shop who often "[sat]" on the high stool, kind of lording over the store...."
