= Ike at the Mike =

1982 short story by Howard Waldrop

"Ike at the Mike" is an alternate history short story by Howard Waldrop. It was first published in Omni, in June 1982.

== Synopsis ==
Decades after he decided to pursue music rather than attend West Point, an elderly Dwight Eisenhower—now a legendary jazz clarinetist—performs at the White House and reminisces about his late friend, drummer "Wild" George S. Patton; in the audience, Senator Presley considers the path of his own life.

== Reception ==
"Ike at the Mike" was a finalist for the 1983 Hugo Award for Best Short Story.

In the Washington Post, Michael Dirda called it "comic and touching". Kirkus Reviews found it "amusing", while Graham Sleight, writing in Strange Horizons, noted that it is "more concise" and "less a prisoner of its own research" than some of Waldrop's other stories.
