= Gary Carlson =

American comic book writer

- Born: Gary Scott Carlson
- Areas: Writer, Editor, Publisher
- Notable works: Megaton anthology Big Bang Comics; Vanguard; Teenage Mutant Ninja Turtles

Gary Scott Carlson is an American comic book writer, editor and publisher, known for his work on his creator-owned comics, such as the 1980s anthology Megaton and Big Bang Comics. He has also worked on books for Image Comics, such as Vanguard, Teenage Mutant Ninja Turtles and Supreme, and on titles for DC Comics and Marvel Comics, such as Aquaman and Nova, respectively.

== Career ==
Gary S. Carlson self-published and created the black and white superhero anthology Megaton in the early 1980s, which introduced many new comic book talents including artists Erik Larsen, Rob Liefeld and Angel Medina (to name a few) as well as featuring the work of Butch Guice, Mike Gustovitch, Sam Grainger, Sam DeLaRosa and Gene Day. Carlson co-created Vanguard with comic book artist Erik Larsen.

Carlson later wrote Vanguard, Teenage Mutant Ninja Turtles and Supreme for Image Comics. He also co-wrote Aquaman and Nova with Erik Larsen.

Carlson is the creative force behind Big Bang Comics, serving as editor, writer and publisher. The series was originally published by Caliber Comics, then Image Comics, and is now self-published under the Big Bang Presents title.

== See also ==
- Big Bang Comics
- List of Big Bang Comics characters
