= Sam Grainger =

American comic artist

- Born: Samuel E. Grainger; June 14, 1930
- Died: July 25, 1990 (aged 60)
- Areas: Penciller, Inker

Samuel E. Grainger (June 14, 1930 – July 25, 1990) was an American comic book artist best known as a Marvel Comics inker during the 1960s and 1970s periods fans and historians call, respectively, the Silver Age and the Bronze Age of Comic Books. Series on which he worked include The Avengers, The Incredible Hulk and X-Men.

== Biography ==
=== Early career ===
Sam Grainger's first known credited comic book work was at the Derby, Connecticut-based publisher Charlton Comics. His seven-page backup story, " Behold...The Sentinels", which he both penciled and inked in Peter Cannon... Thunderbolt #54 (Oct. 1966), also marked the first superhero story by prominent 1960s comic-book writer Gary Friedrich. Grainger continued on the "Sentinels" feature through issue #59 (Sept. 1967).

Grainger sketch of his 1960s fanzine character Astral Man

Afterward, he drew the cover and writer Howard Keltner's eight-page story "The Adder", starring the superhero Astral Man, in the fanzine Star-Studded Comics #14 (Dec. 1968). Another issue's adaptation of the Gardner Fox novel Warrior of Llarn by writer Roy Thomas and artist Grainger was reprinted in the book The Best of Star-Studded Comics (Hamster Press, 2005). Grainger additionally drew and colored some covers for 1969 issues of the Edgar Rice Burroughs fanzine ERB-dom, and interior art beginning 1965.

=== Marvel Comics ===
Grainger made his Marvel Comics debut inking a backup story in X-Men #55 (April 1969), over penciler Werner Roth. He went on to ink further X-Men backups as well as covers and interior stories in The Avengers (over John Buscema, Sal Buscema, and Gene Colan); the satirical comic Not Brand Echh; The Incredible Hulk and Nick Fury, Agent of S.H.I.E.L.D. (both over Herb Trimpe); and the feature "Ka-Zar" in Astonishing Tales, over industry legend Jack Kirby.

Among his considerable amount of 1970s work, Grainger inked penciler Dave Cockrum on several issues of X-Men, a title whose revival in that decade led to its becoming one of comics' most popular series. Cockrum's successor, John Byrne, later stated that he had requested that Grainger be kept on as inker for his run so as to "soften the blow" of Cockrum's departure, but that this idea was rejected by editorial staff.

=== Later career ===
In the 1970s, Grainger inked for both Marvel and DC Comics, including on the latter's Ghosts, Unknown Soldier and House of Mystery. He also inked two issues of the independent comics series Southern Knights, from publisher The Guild, and various issues of and backup stories in Grimjack and Dreadstar, from First Comics.

Grainger moved to Charlotte, North Carolina, sometime before spring 1969. There he freelanced for the role-playing games company TSR, Inc.; his work there includes interior art for the "Endless Quest" series of gamebooks, including the Dungeons & Dragons book Under Dragon's Wing (Feb. 1984), the Hyborian Age book Conan and the Prophecy (June 1984), the Star Frontiers book Captive Planet (July 1984), and, with Jim Holloway, the Dungeons & Dragons book Knight of Illusion (June 1986).

Fantasy artist Clyde Caldwell described Grainger's later career, and his mentorship:

My dad was a printer and worked for a company called Radiator Specialty in Charlotte. Sam Grainger, an artist who did comics work for Marvel Comics, was employed by the same company. When I was a kid, I used to do drawings of superheroes and send them over to Sam for critiquing. After I graduated from college and decided that I wanted to become an illustrator, I did a little freelance work for Sam, who at that point in time had his own commercial animation studio in Charlotte. Later on, when I was working at TSR, Inc., Sam did some work for us on a freelance basis. He was a great guy. I learned a lot from him.

Grainger made guest appearances at the Charlotte comic book convention Heroes Convention. Before he succumbed to diabetes-related medical issues, Heroes Con in 1987 held a benefit auction for his medical expenses. Grainger's last work was penciling and inking the posthumously published, eight-page Volstagg story "The Thief of Asgard" in Marvel Comics Presents #66 (1990).

== Personal life ==
Grainger was living in North Carolina when he died on July 25, 1990.
