= Knight Watchman =

- The Knight Watchman, artist Ben Torres.

Publication information
- Publisher: Big Bang Comics
- First appearance: Berzerker #1 (February 1993, Caliber Comics)
- Created by: Chris Ecker (writer & artist)

In-story information
- Alter ego: Reid Randall
- Species: Normal human
- Team affiliations: Earth B: Knights of Justice; Earth A: Round Table of America
- Notable aliases: Twilight Paladin, Purple Pimpernel
- Abilities: World class athlete, skilled fighter, detective.

Knight Watchman (AKA: Reid Randall) is a fictional superhero from the Big Bang Comics universe, residing on Earth A during the Silver Age of comics. He first appeared in Berzerker #1 (February 1993), and was created by writer/artist Chris Ecker.

In the fictional history of Big Bang Comics, his first appearance was in Deductive Comics.

== Fictional character biography ==
Knight Watchman is based in Midway City (not to be confused with the city featured in Doom Patrol), where he fought crime for fifty years while maintaining a career as a fashion designer.

Reid Randall's crimefighting life started after receiving a telegram saying that his brother, Ted, was in the hospital, leaving no one to run the family business, a garment factory. Back home, his mother told him that Ted had gambling debts, and the people he owed wanted to take the business. The beating Ted had received was a warning; next time the factory would be destroyed. Later that evening a hood tells Ted to sign over the business; Reid walks in and the hood runs out. Later Ted and Janet (Ted's wife) are killed by a car bomb. Reid swears to find the men responsible, make them pay, and rid the world of their kind.

Knight Watchman trained in ninjutsu with Hamato Yoshi. As time goes on, he becomes more of an antihero. By the time Big Bang Comics had entered the modern day (the 1990s), Knight Watchman is reluctant to come out of retirement despite attempts by Ultiman to place Randall back in the cape.

Reid's nephew, Jerry Randall, becomes Knight Watchman's sidekick, Kid Galahad. As he grows up Jerry becomes a hero in his own right as Galahad (a reference to Dick Grayson's career as Robin and Nightwing). After Reid retires, Jerry fills both roles; as the publicly known and liked Galahad during the day, and as the mysterious and feared Knight Watchman at night. Reid later came out of retirement at the age of 55 when Jerry was hospitalized with a broken leg.

Although in comics continuity, Knight Watchman exists in Earth-A (Silver Age), Knight Watchman appeared alongside the Earth-B Golden Age heroes in the TV movie Knights of Justice.

== Enemies ==
Knight Watchman has an assortment of enemies:

- Baron Fledermaus
- Cheshire Cat
- El Diablo
- Faulty Towers
- Grandfather Clock is a supervillain that commits time-based crimes. He is loosely based on Clock King.
- Mr. Mask is a supervillain that can reshape his clay-like face. He is based on Clayface.
- Pink Flamingo is based on both Joker and Penguin.
- Quizmaster is a former quiz show question writer and is based on Riddler.
