= Ultiman =

- Ultiman Giant Annual #1, artist Jeff Weigel

Publication information
- Publisher: Big Bang Comics
- First appearance: Big Bang Comics #1 (Spring 1994)
- Created by: Gary S. Carlson

In-story information
- Alter ego: Chris Kelly
- Team affiliations: Round Table of America
- Abilities: Both: Superhuman strength and speed Invulnerability; Flight; Earth-A version: Fluoroscopic and laser visions Super hearing

Ultiman is a fictional character published by Big Bang Comics. First appearing in Big Bang Comics #1 (Spring 1994), he was created by Gary Carlson and drawn by his partner Chris Ecker, among others. There are two existing versions of Ultiman. Metafictionally, the first is from the Golden Age of comics on Earth-B, and the second from the Silver Age of comics on Earth-A. Ultiman has proven to be the most popular of all Big Bang Comics heroes.

== Fictional character biography ==
=== Earth-A ===
The Earth-A Ultiman is a member of the Roundtable of America, though he frequently battles evil in Empire City. His main foe is Reverso, a parody of Bizarro. The Earth-A Ultiman received his powers after surviving a Project Gemini spacecraft incident. The cosmic radiation gave him "ultrapowers" (rather than superpowers), and so Ultiman set out to do good in the world. Ultiman also has link to Lori Lake, a pastiche of Lois Lane.

By accident, Chris' daughter Christine got exposed to a radioactive meteor giving her his powers after his death.

=== Earth-B ===
His Earth-B counterpart is a member of the Knights of Justice, and was a 4-F reject from the army who received powers after his car was hit by a meteorite that gave Ultiman ultrapowers. The Earth-B equivalent also appeared in the Big Bang TV movie, Knights of Justice.

== Powers ==
Both forms of Ultiman have flight, ultrastrength, ultraspeed and laser-vision, and Ultiman himself is seen as a homage of Superman, and both go by the name of Chris Kelly. However, besides time-zones and origins, the Ultimen differ because of the costume. Earth-A has gloves, while Earth-B has a belt.

Ultiman must also recharge his powers from a meteorite. Repeated exposures appear to slowly poison him, causing him to experience steadily more severe symptoms each time before recovering with his powers restored.

== Enemies ==
Ultiman has an assortment of enemies:

- Dr. Dexter Cortex is a bald mad scientist who has a computer-linked brain. He is a mixture of Doctor Sivana, Lex Luthor and Brainiac.
- Reverso is a supervillain who comes from a reverse reality. He is a parody of Bizarro.
- Super Stormtrooper is a Nazi version of Ultiman.

== In other media ==
=== Miscellaneous ===
- An Ultiman pastiche, named Optiman, from Earth-36 was included in the two-page spread of the Supermen of the Multiverse in Final Crisis #7.
