= American Eagle (Standard Comics) =

Publication information
- Publisher: Standard Comics; AC Comics; America's Best Comics (DC)
- First appearance: America's Best Comics #2 (Sept 1941)
- Created by: Richard E. Hughes; Kin Platt

In-story information
- Alter ego: Tom Standish
- Team affiliations: SMASH
- Abilities: Enhanced strength Flight "Fighting qualities of America's national bird"

The American Eagle is a superhero from the Golden Age of Comics. He first appeared in America's Best Comics #2 (Sept 1942), published by Nedor Comics, an imprint of Standard Comics.

American Eagle was revived by two other comics publishers: first AC Comics, and then by America's Best Comics, by writer Alan Moore as part of his Tom Strong comics and its spin-off Terra Obscura.

== Nedor Comics ==
American Eagle was the secret identity of scientist Tom Standish. While performing experiments for the US government, he was accidentally exposed to a mysterious black ray infused with the blood of an eagle. The ray gave him the powers of the bald eagle — flight, strength and (of course) patriotism. Standish used his powers to fight the Nazis and other enemies during World War II. He was accompanied by his young companion Bud Pierce who, as "Eaglet", had powers similar to the American Eagle. His enemies include Dr. Amoto and the Red Mask. In one story, "The Machine That Raised the Dead", the Nazis use a machine to bring historical figures back to life, including Blackbeard, a Neanderthal and a Viking.

=== Nedor Comics bibliography ===
The American Eagle appeared in:

- America's Best Comics #2, 6-7, 10-12, 14 (Sept 1942 - June 1945)
- Exciting Comics #22-27, 29-38, 40-47, 49-50 (Oct 1942 - Aug 1946)
- The Fighting Yank #18 (Nov 1946)

== AC Comics ==
AC Comics has reused the Golden Age American Eagle in their revival of the Nedor Comics superheroes. He has appeared in issues of The Fighting Yank, set during the 1950s.

== America's Best Comics/DC ==
The Golden Age version of the American Eagle was also revived by Alan Moore for his Tom Strong comics, published by America's Best Comics. Moore used the Nedor Comics characters to populate Terra Obscura, the alternate universe version of Tom Strong's Earth. In Moore's story, the heroes had been placed in suspended animation in 1969, and were revived 30 years later by Tom Strong. The American Eagle made a brief appearance in Tom Strong #12 (June 2001).

The American Eagle is featured briefly in the Terra Obscura spin-off series. Issue #4 reveals that the American Eagle and Eaglet had been looking for the missing Captain Future, and had traced him to the lair of Dr. X. In the struggle that followed the American Eagle and Eaglet were both killed; their bodies were discovered three years later by the Scarab and the Liberator.
