= Terra Obscura =

2003 comic miniseries by Peter Hogan

- Cover to Terra Obscura #1, art by Yanick Paquette and Karl Story

Publication information
- Publisher: America's Best Comics
- Schedule: Monthly
- Format: Miniseries
- No. of issues: 12
- Main character: See Characters

Creative team
- Created by: Alan Moore
- Written by: Peter Hogan; Alan Moore
- Artist(s): Yanick Paquette; Karl Story

Terra Obscura is a 2003 comic book miniseries spin-off from Alan Moore's Tom Strong series. The stories are written by Peter Hogan, and drawn by Yanick Paquette and Karl Story with additional flashback sequences drawn by Eric Theriault. Each story is co-plotted by Alan Moore and Peter Hogan. It was published under Moore's America's Best Comics imprint through WildStorm, which is owned by DC Comics.

== Origin and backstory ==
Terra Obscura first appeared in Tom Strong #11 (January 2001). Terra Obscura is an alternate version of Tom Strong's Earth located on the far side of the galaxy, discovered by Strong in 1968. On his visit to Terra Obscura, Tom meets his counterpart Tom "Doc" Strange, and the team of science-heroes known as the Society of Major American Science Heroes (SMASH). All the members of SMASH are based on characters previously published by Nedor Comics in the 1940s. With the original publisher's collapse, copyrights on the characters were not renewed upon 28 years of creation and so lapsed into the public domain. One of Nedor's many titles was America's Best Comics, and when the coincidence of this was pointed out to Alan Moore, he decided to incorporate these characters into his Tom Strong series.

For their 2000 debut, Moore created a backstory for them, covering the time periods during which they were not actually being published. For the Terra Obscura spin-off, Moore worked out plots with Peter Hogan, who then wrote the scripts.

== Publishing history ==
- Collections:
  - Terra Obscura v1 (ISBN 1-4012-0286-1), collects issues #1–6, volume 1.
  - Terra Obscura v2 (ISBN 1-4012-0622-0), collects issues #1–6, volume 2.
- Special issue:
  - ABC A–Z: Terra Obscura and Splash Brannigan (published in January 2006): Background on SMASH and the superheroes of Terra Obscura.
- Trade Paper Back Collections:
  - "Terra Obscura: S.M.A.S.H. of Two Worlds" (ISBN 978-1-4012-4280-0) (published by Vertigo in 2014), collects: issues #1–6, volume 1; issues #1–6, volume 2, and "ABC A–Z: Terra Obscura and Splash Brannigan".

== Characters ==
=== SMASH members ===
- Doc Strange
- Mike Ellis (deceased): The young sidekick of Tom Strange, he was killed in 1969 when battling the invader from the Moon.
- The Terror / Terror 2000 (deceased/revived)
- Tim Roland: The Terror's loyal side-kick, his reflexes and strength have been augmented by energy-enhancing vapors discovered by Bob Benton.
- Pyroman
- Captain Future
- The Fighting Yank (I) (deceased)
- The Fighting Spirit, now the Fighting Yank II.
- Miss Masque
- The Ghost / The Green Ghost (deceased/revived)
- Princess Pantha
- American Crusader
- Lance Lewis, Space Detective (deceased)
- The Magnet
- The Liberator
- Adam the Ape: An enhanced ape.
- The Woman in Red
- Mystico: The mummy of the Egyptian pharaoh Smenkhkare, he is restored to life by a mad scientist's vita-ray machine in 1940. His magical powers are seemingly without limit.
- The Scarab
- The Grim Reaper (deceased): He is killed by the Terror 2000 program.

=== The Four Comrades ===
A science-hero team based in New Lancaster who were forced to try to maintain control after SMASH were left frozen in space and time in 1969. By the time the members of SMASH had been released from their captivity in 2000, they had aged and an original member, Tip, had died and been replaced by his sister, Tipper.

They encounter the revived heroes in the inverted city of 'Invertica':

- Pudge
- Buzz
- Tommy
- Tip (deceased)
- Tipper

=== Miscellaneous characters ===
- Dr. X: Occultist and physicist, apparently researching interdimensional travel at his base, Fort X, near the Hoover Dam, he is notoriously reclusive.
- The Oracle: He can see the future in his dreams and has a special chamber beneath the Pentagon where he is kept safe and his predictions are recorded.
- Theseus: Not seen since the 1960s.
- The Gremlin
- Spectro
- Black Satan
- Dr. Voodoo

== See also ==
- America's Best Comics
- Project Superpowers
