= Magnet (Nedor Comics) =

The Magnet

Publication information
- Publisher: Nedor Comics; America's Best Comics (DC)
- First appearance: Complete Book of Comics and Funnies #1 (1944)

In-story information
- Alter ego: Grant Halford
- Team affiliations: SMASH
- Abilities: Original (none); Revival (magnetic-based location powers)

The Magnet is a fictional character from the Golden Age of Comics. He first appeared in the Complete Book of Comics and Funnies #1 (1944), published by Nedor Comics. The character was later revived by writer Alan Moore for America's Best Comics.

== Nedor Comics ==
The Magnet is the secret identity of Grant Halford, inventor of the Geo-Locator. The Geo-Locator allows him to track down villains and Nazis. His foes include the Crimson Conqueror, Aztec mummies and treasure-hunters.

After his debut in Complete Book of Comics and Funnies, the Magnet appeared in all four issues of Mystery Comics (1944). Both titles were discontinued due to the wartime paper shortage. No creator for the character was credited, but most of the art was supplied by Ed Good.

== America's Best Comics ==
Alan Moore revived the Magnet, along with many other Nedor Comics characters, for his Tom Strong series. For the revival, the Magnet was given a new backstory: sometime during World War II, the Magnet met and became friends with the time travelling Lance Lewis, Space Detective. Shortly after this the Magnet gained magnetic powers after the Geo-Locator exploded in his face.

Grant Halford was one of the members of SMASH that had been placed in suspended animation after an alien invasion from the Moon in 1969. Awakened 30 years later, Halford joined his former comrades in the fight against the alien. After SMASH disbanded, Halford and Lance opened "The Magnet Detective Agency". Three years later, Halford (his magnetic powers now unreliable) discovered that his partner had been killed by the supervillain Mystico (Terra Obscura vol. 1 #2, September 2003). Halford and the other members of SMASH defeated Mystico's plan to conquer the world. Halford has since married Betty Chance, widow of the Green Ghost.
