= Princess Pantha =

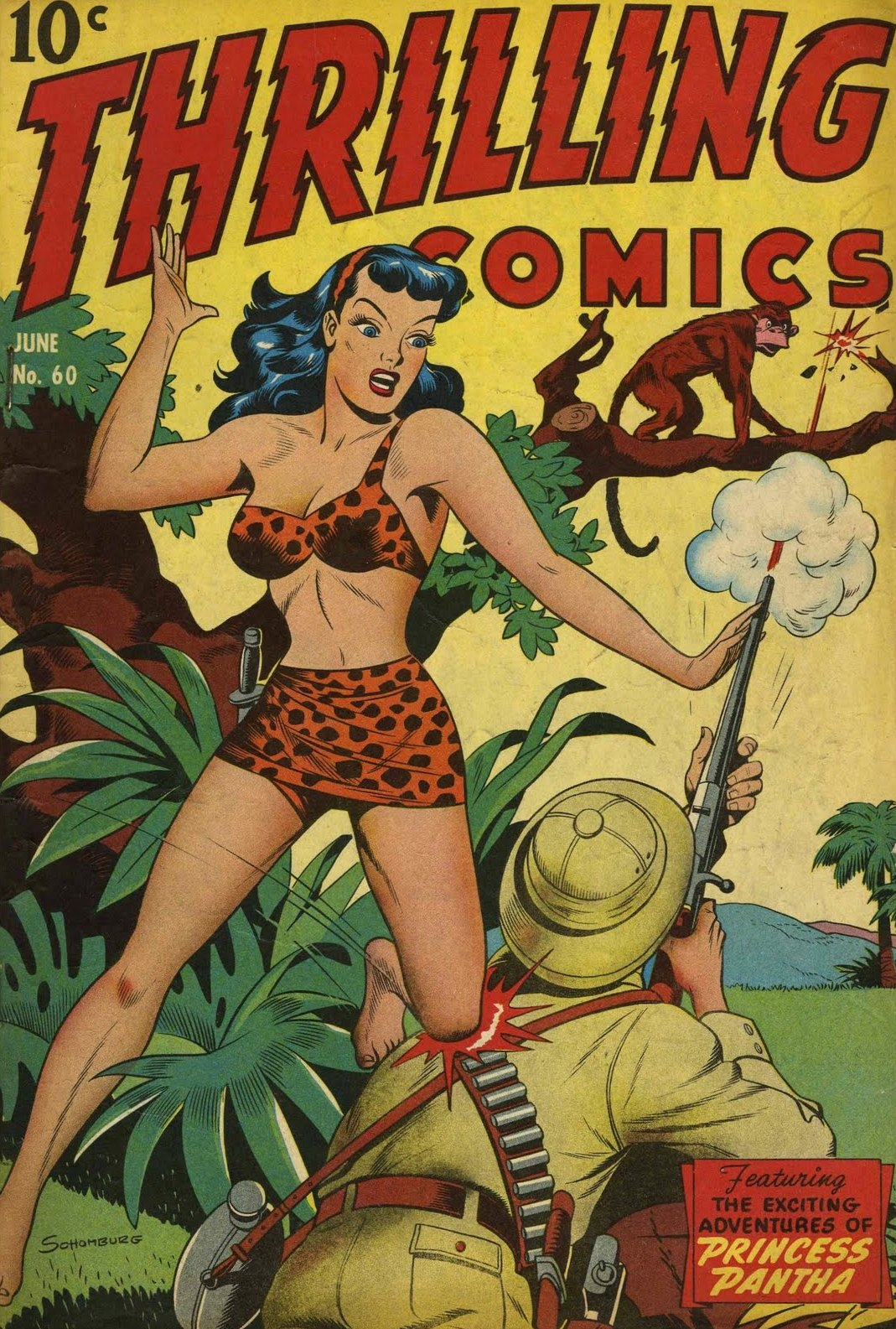
- Princess Pantha, on the cover of Thrilling Comics #60, art by Alex Schomburg.

Publication information
- Publisher: Nedor Comics
- First appearance: Thrilling Comics #56 (October 1946)
- Created by: Art Saaf (artist)

In-story information
- Place of origin: Terra Obscura
- Team affiliations: SMASH

Princess Pantha is a jungle heroine that appeared in comic books published by Nedor Comics. The character was revived twice; first by AC Comics, and then by writer Alan Moore for his Tom Strong spin-off, Terra Obscura. She first appeared in Thrilling Comics #56 (October 1946).

== Nedor Comics ==
Princess Pantha is one of the many characters inspired by Sheena, Queen of the Jungle that appeared in the 1940s. Her origin story is told in her first appearance: Pantha is a circus performer visiting Africa to find a legendary wild gorilla for her act. She was accidentally stranded in the jungles of Africa for several months, and survived by virtue of her ability to sound like a gorilla. She soon replaces her Western clothing with her trade-mark leopard-skin bikini. Even after being rescued by adventurer Dane Hunter, Pantha decides to stay in Africa to search for the mysterious white gorilla.

The adventures of Princess Pantha appeared in Thrilling Comics from issue #56 until #74 (October 1949), when she was replaced by stories about cowboy Buck Ranger. Art Saaf illustrated most of Pantha's stories, with Alex Schomburg drawing all her cover appearances.

One story, "The Land of the Black Python" (Thrilling Comics #66, June 1948), has been cited as an example of racial insensitivity: "a white Princess Pantha taught black Africans to overcome racial prejudice in a near-classic example of "blame-the-victim" mentality".

== AC Comics ==
During the 1990s, AC Comics reprinted the adventures of Princess Pantha, along with many other characters from the Golden Age of Comic Books. AC comics later published new adventures featuring Princess Pantha for their Jungle Girls: Wild Side series.

== America's Best Comics ==
Princess Pantha is one of the many Nedor Comics characters revived by Alan Moore for his Tom Strong spin-off, Terra Obscura. The stories were published by America's Best Comics, originally an imprint of Wildstorm, now an imprint of DC Comics.

In Tom Strong #11 (January 2001), Strong visits the alternate Earth of Tom Strange, which he names Terra Obscura. The superhero team of Terra Obscura, SMASH, had been imprisoned in suspended animation since facing an alien menace in 1969. Strong and Strange are able to overcome the alien menace thirty years later, and free SMASH. Princess Pantha is one of the heroes freed by the duo in Tom Strong #12 (June 2001).

Pantha appears in Terra Obscura vol. 2 (October 2004 - May 2005), as an associate member of SMASH. She also begins dating Doc Strange, as her husband Dale Hunter had died while she was in suspended animation. These stories were written by Peter Hogan, based on plots provided by Alan Moore. The artwork was supplied by Yanick Paquette.

The stories featuring Princess Pantha have been collected in several trade paperbacks:

- Tom Strong: Book Two, issues 8-14 (hardcover: ISBN 1-84023-456-3, paperback: ISBN 1-56389-880-2).
- Terra Obscura v2 (ISBN 1-4012-0622-0, 2005). Collects issues #7-12.

== Powers and abilities ==
Princess Pantha has no superhuman powers. She is highly athletic, skilled in hand-to-hand combat and has mastery of jiu-jitsu. She is also an accomplished animal trainer.
