= Grim Reaper (Nedor Comics) =

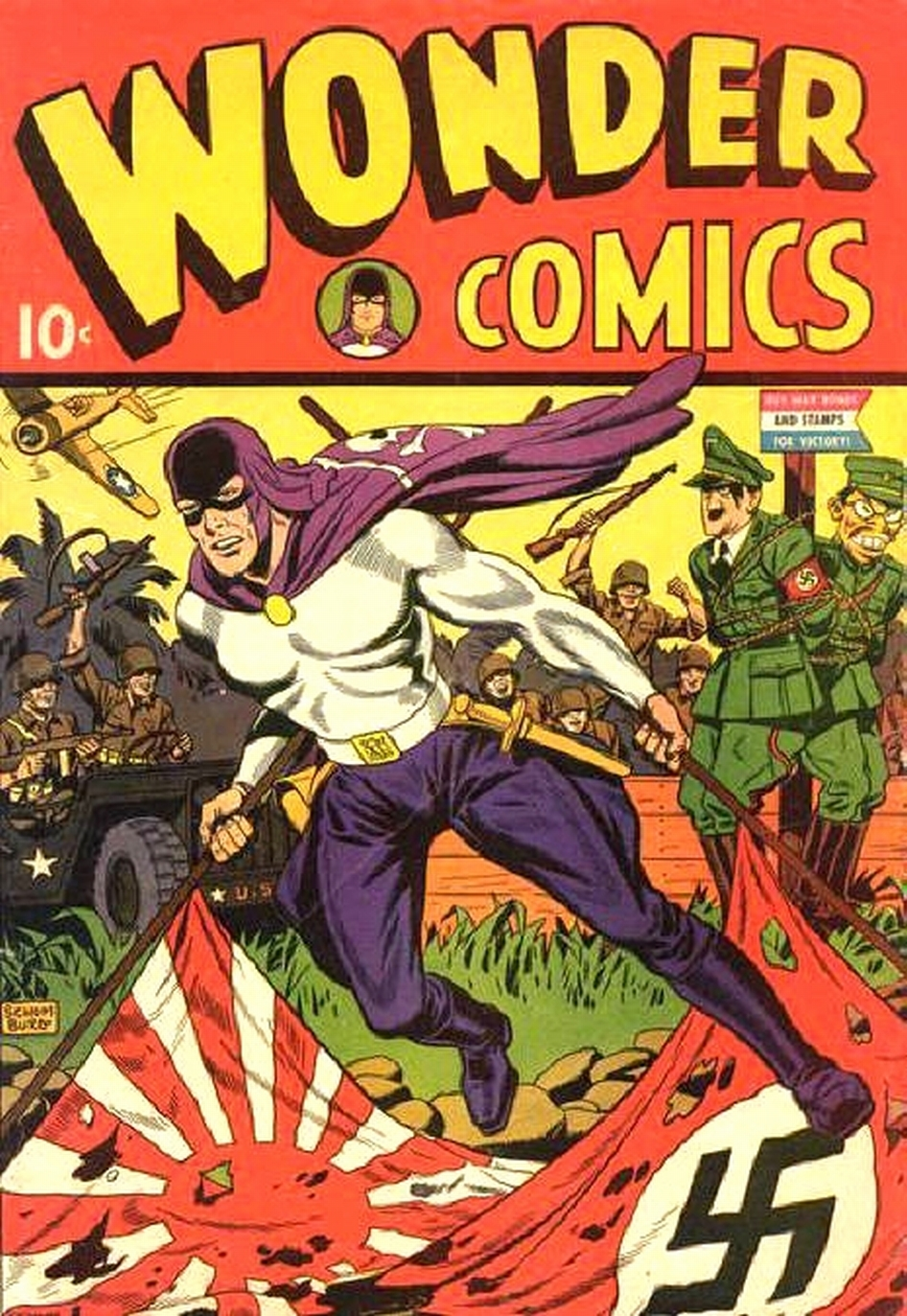
- Wonder Comics #1

Publication information
- Publisher: Nedor Comics; America's Best Comics
- First appearance: Fighting Yank #7
- Created by: Richard E. Hughes

In-story information
- Alter ego: William 'Bill' Norris
- Team affiliations: SMASH
- Abilities: Originally: Use of guns and a sword ABC revival: Electromagnetic blast projection via sword

Grim Reaper is a character and a superhero. Created by writer/editor Richard E. Hughes, he first appeared in Fighting Yank #7 (Feb 1944), and was quickly promoted to cover feature of Wonder Comics (Better Publications), beginning with #1 (May 1944). His origin story was told in Wonder Comics #2.

The character was revived in the modern age in Tom Strong #11 by Alan Moore and Chris Sprouse. He was killed by The Terror in the Terra Obscura miniseries.

== Character history ==
Bill Norris is studying at the Sorbonne in Paris, France when the Nazis occupy the city. Intervening in a Nazi harassment of a citizen, Norris is arrested and sent to a concentration camp. He helps an old man, who eventually confides to Norris that he's the leader of the French Underground and knows the location of an important French General, who has to be safely brought to Africa to continue the battle. Fashioning an all black Grim Reaper outfit, Norris, with help from the French citizenry, rescues the General. The Reaper regularly kills his Nazi foes with his bare hands.

He is, at one point, number one on the Gestapo's wanted list.

The Grim Reaper is often shown working behind enemy lines in the German underground. The Reaper makes his way to England in Wonder Comics #4.

In one adventure, the Reaper brings an armored Nazi super-zeppelin to England and wants nothing more than to go back to the continent: "The only reward I want is a chance to fight the Nazi beasts again and again... to spread terror among the foulest terrorists the world has ever known! Tremble, you Nazis! The Grim Reaper is coming back!"

After the war ended, Norris returned to America in Wonder Comics #8 (Oct 1946), and continued his superheroics. He battled Mr. Meek, the Robed Phantom, the Chameleon and the Crying Bandit. His final story was published in Wonder Comics #17 (April 1948).

== Revivals ==
=== America's Best Comics ===
The Grim Reaper, along with other heroes from Nedor Comics, were revived by Alan Moore in his series Tom Strong. This revival set the characters on a parallel world called Terra Obscura, which was also the title of the resulting mini-series.

This Reaper eventually opposed the goals of the revived Black Terror and was killed, during his own unsuccessful attempt to put an end to the Terror.

== Powers and abilities ==
The Grim Reaper has no superhuman powers, but in the Golden Age, he used guns and a sword to fight Nazis. When revived by ABC, his sword could project electromagnetic blasts.

== In other media ==
Grim Reaper appears in the seventh season of Arrow, portrayed by John DeSantis. This version is an unnamed criminal who works for Ricardo Diaz's criminal organisation, acting as his inside man at Slabside prison. His nickname comes from the tattoo on his neck. Reaper is later placed in Level Two of the prison, where he is experimented and tortured for weeks by Slabside's corrupt chief psychiatrist Jarrett Parker, losing his sense of identity and ultimately dying from stress.

== See also ==
- Tom Strong
- Terra Obscura
- Nedor Comics
- SMASH
