= American Crusader =

- American Crusader, from Project Superpowers vol. 1 #3.

Publication information
- Publisher: Nedor Comics; AC Comics; America's Best Comics
- First appearance: Thrilling Comics #19

In-story information
- Alter ego: Archibald "Archie" Masters
- Team affiliations: (AC Comics) Sentinels of Justice (ABC) SMASH
- Abilities: Super strength Super speed Flight; Bulletproof; Electromagnetic pulse

The American Crusader is a superhero who originally appeared in Thrilling Comics #19 (Better Publications, August 1941). He appeared in almost every issue until #41 (April 1944).

The character was revived in the Modern Age in Femforce #59, by AC Comics, and in Tom Strong #11, by Alan Moore and Chris Sprouse.

== Character history ==
His secret identity is Professor Archibald (Archie) Masters, an astronomy professor at an unnamed university in the Eastern United States.

The character debuted in 1941, his mousy alter-ego being similar to that of Superman's Clark Kent identity. He accidentally got caught in a room with a device called an atom smasher, and, inevitably, the experiment went awry. Instead of killing him, the accident blasted him with radiation, which endowed him with various superhuman abilities. He used these powers to fight crime as the American Crusader.

Cribbed from Superman's relationship with Lois Lane, Prof. Masters has a secretary named Jane Peters, who despised the professor but idolized the hero. The Crusader also briefly has a teen sidekick named Mickey Martin.

His enemies include Nazis, mad scientists, and Nazi mad scientists, as well as Nazi zombies.

The Crusader appeared in the following titles in the Golden Age:

- America's Best Comics #6
- Thrilling Comics #19-35, #37-39, #41

== Revivals ==
=== AC Comics ===
The American Crusader, along with other heroes from Nedor Comics, was revived by AC Comics through the Vault of Heroes, a suspended animation program for superheroes. He later joined the Sentinels of Justice.

=== America's Best Comics ===
Several heroes from Nedor Comics were revived by Alan Moore in his America's Best Comics continuity, starting withTom Strong #11. The next issue, #12, revealed the American Crusader was among these heroes. In the canon of America's Best Comics, the American Crusader and his comrades were all part of a team called SMASH. On Tom Strong's world, they were believed to be comic book characters, but in fact they were real people who inhabited another version of Earth occupying another area of the same universe. Tom Strong referred to this other Earth as "Terra Obscura". The American Crusader and other SMASH heroes then went on to star in Terra Obscura vol. 1 and Terra Obscura vol. 2.

In this canon, the Crusader operates as a powerful superhero while also dealing with alcoholism. He works alongside the other heroes of SMASH for many years until 1969, when he and his comrades are imprisoned by an alien device that capture them in localized time-loops. The only member of SMASH who isn't imprisoned is "Doc" Tom Strange, his world's version of Tom Strong. Doc Strange journeys to Tom Strong's Earth to recruit his help while his SMASH comrades remain frozen in time. In the year 2000, Tom Strong and Tom Strange finally free the American Crusader and other heroes from the time-loops. Having not aged since 1969, the members of SMASH resume their heroic activities, including the Crusader who now seeks help in managing his alcoholism.

=== Living Legends and Tales of the Living Legends ===
The American Crusader made a brief appearance in the prose story Living Legends, published by Metahuman Press. A flashback comic story featuring rescripted pages over the comic work has also been published as part of the Tales of the Living Legends webcomic.

=== Project Superpowers ===
The American Crusader appears in the mini-series Project Superpowers, by Alex Ross and Jim Krueger. He is kept imprisoned and unconscious by a totalitarian government, and clones called Crusaders are created from his DNA to function as super-powered soldiers.

In the related Black Terror series, the Black Terror finds Archie and helps him to lure the Crusaders and destroy them, using the last of Archie's energy in the process. The Crusaders all die, and an African-American soldier named Marcus Chamberlain, who was with Archie and the Terror at the last moment, gains the power and becomes the new American Crusader.

In the spin-off Project Superpowers: Fractured States, the original American Crusader is resurrected alongside other heroes lost in the void.

=== Heroes Inc. ===
Archibald Masters, the American Crusader, appears as a center character in the ongoing webcomic Heroes Inc., created in 2009 by Scott E. Austin. The webcomic takes place in an alternate reality where the allies of World War II lost the war. In present day, the American Crusader gathers DNA from Golden Age heroes in order to create a new generation of heroes.

=== DC Comics ===
A version of the character was used in the Multiversity series, where he was the leader of a superteam on a parallel Earth, called the Retaliators (a reference to Captain America and his Avengers). A second version of the character is killed at the beginning of the story to raise the stakes, and the character is shown on the cover of a comic read by a character during the story.

== Powers and abilities ==
The American Crusader is capable of flight, superhuman strength, invulnerability to bullets, and electromagnetic pulse generation. The full extent of his powers at this time is unknown.

== Short films ==
The American Crusader (played by Jesse Pattison) appears as a supporting player in the 2025 short film based on the Black Terror, directed by Chris R. Notarile.

In 2026, Notarile reused the character in the eponymous The American Crusder, starring Tyler Fleming as a darker version of the hero.

== See also ==
- Nedor Comics
- SMASH
- Terra Obscura
- Tom Strong
