= Scarab (Nedor Comics) =

The Scarab

Publication information
- Publisher: Nedor Comics; America's Best Comics (DC)
- First appearance: Startling Comics #34 (July 1945)

In-story information
- Alter ego: Peter Ward
- Team affiliations: SMASH
- Notable aliases: Thoth
- Abilities: Super-human strength, flight, invulnerability

The Scarab is a superhero from the Golden Age of Comics. He first appeared in Startling Comics #34 (July 1945), published by Nedor Comics. The character was later revived by writer Alan Moore for America's Best Comics.

== Nedor Comics ==
The Scarab was the secret identity of Egyptologist Peter Ward, who decoded a secret message in an ancient papyrus scroll. Ward was actually the reincarnation of an ancient Egyptian high priest; by rubbing his magic scarab ring Ward would instantly transform into the super-powerful Scarab. He was accompanied by Akh-Tu-Men, an intelligent black cat.

The Scarab debuted in Startling Comics #34, and became a regular backup feature in Exciting Comics from issue #42-48. His last Golden Age appearance was in The Black Terror #20 (October 1947).

== America's Best Comics ==
Alan Moore revived the Scarab, along with many other Nedor Comics characters, for his Tom Strong series. In Tom Strong #12 (June 2001), the Scarab was revealed to have been one of the members of SMASH that had been placed in suspended animation after an alien invasion from the Moon in 1969. Awakened 30 years later, the Scarab joined his former comrades in the fight against the alien. SMASH disbanded shortly thereafter, but reformed three years later. The Scarab is a member of the reformed group.

In the Terra Obscura spin-off series, the Scarab allows himself to be bonded with the ancient Egyptian god Thoth in order to control one-time superhero Mystico (who is himself bonded with the god Seth).

== Dynamite Entertainment ==
The Scarab

Publication information
- Publisher: Dynamite Entertainment
- First appearance: Project Superpowers #0 (cameo; January 2008)

In-story information
- Alter ego: Amon Khadul
- Team affiliations: The Superpowers
- Abilities: None; wears exoskeletal armor that lets him fly and gives him superhuman strength and speed, and is equipped with electronic jamming technology.

The 2008 miniseries Project Superpowers from Dynamite Entertainment introduced a new version of the Scarab. He is a loose interpretation of the Golden Age Scarab, with more differences from the source than other characters in the series, who are all characters who have fallen into the public domain.

=== Fictional biography ===
Ten years ago, Amon Khadul found a priceless stone shaped like a scarab, and he sold it for a fortune upon which he built a financial empire. Wanting to make a difference in the world, he built the Scarab armor to fight against the F-Troops who were invading the Middle East; electronic jammers in his armor prevented people from recording his existence. It was there that he met Samson, who convinced him to fight the enemy openly, and this encounter led to Scarab becoming an ally of The Superpowers. However, Amon Khadul is also a member of The Supremacy, a secret council that rules the world and considers the returned heroes a threat to their system; because he is opposed to The Supremacy's practices and lust for power, Khadul acts as a "double agent", keeping the Superpowers informed of The Supremacy's plans.

Unbeknownst to Khadul, the scarab-shaped stone he had found and sold was formerly part of a magic ring that once belonged to another hero known as the Scarab; the fact that Khadul has taken the same name and symbol is a coincidence... or perhaps fate.

=== Armor ===
The Scarab wears a suit of exoskeletal armor, which resembles a silver-colored humanoid scarab. The armor gives Scarab superhuman strength and speed, and its wings enable him to fly with great speed and maneuverability. The armor is also equipped with electronic jamming technology, which prevents people from electronically recording him.

== Film ==
A modernized version of the Scarab (played by Mark Courneyea) appears alongside other Golden Age superheroes in the independent film Avenging Force: The Scarab, a low-budget production likely attempting to capitalize on the success of the film Marvel's The Avengers. Other featured characters include the Woman in Red, Black Terror and Doubledare.
