= Judy of the Jungle =

Comic book character

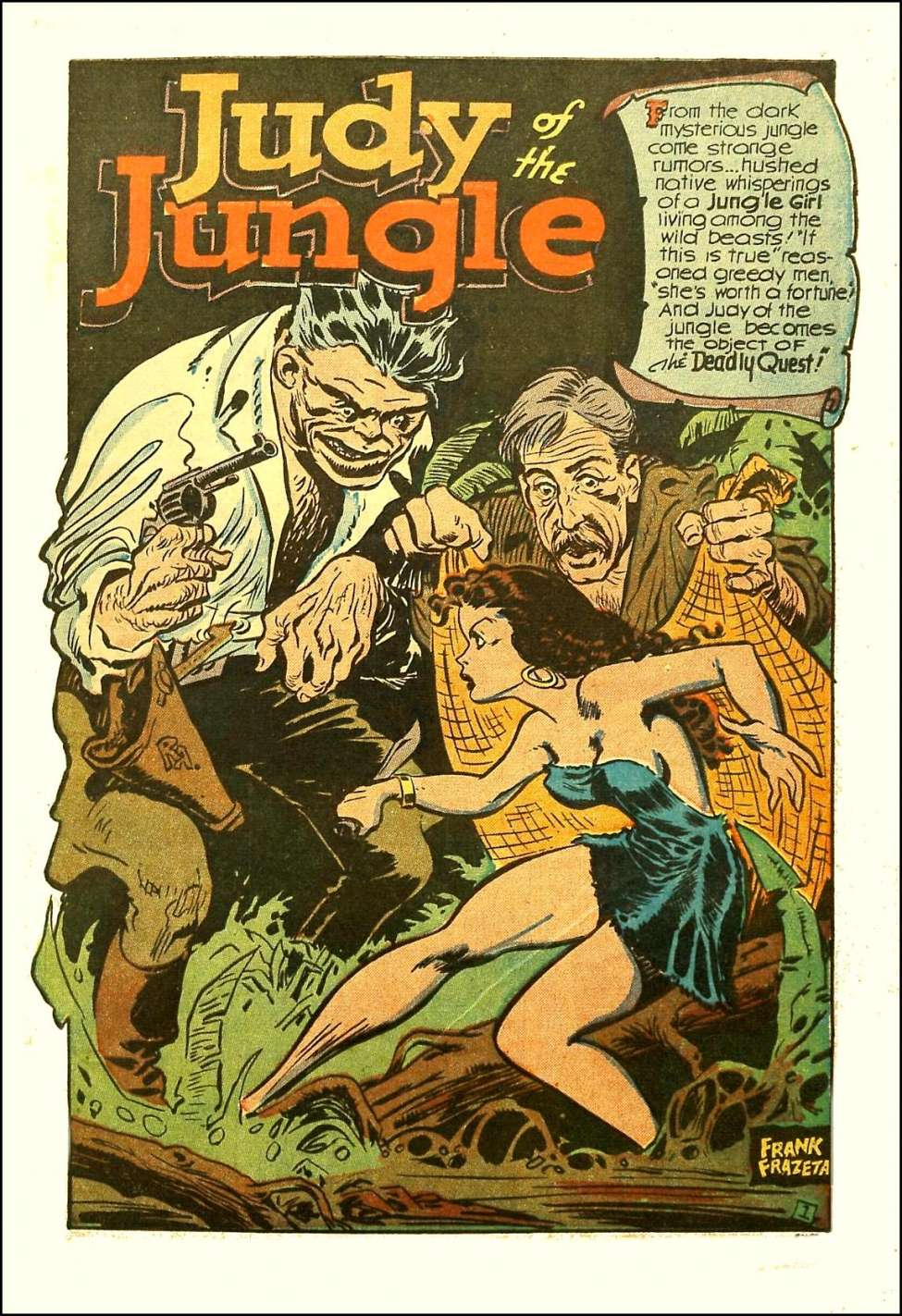

Publication information
- Publisher: Nedor Comics
- First appearance: Exciting Comics #55 (May 1947)
- Created by: Ralph Mayo (art)

In-story information
- Abilities: None

Judy of the Jungle is a fictional character from the Golden Age of Comics; she appeared in comic books published by Nedor Comics. She first appeared in print in Exciting Comics #55 (May 1947).

Judy is raised by her naturalist father in the African jungle. When he is shot, she avenges his death, and becomes a jungle girl hero. Her love interest is American G-man Pistol Roberts. She is assisted by her animal friends Chan (a monkey), Tanda (an elephant) and Kala (a black panther). According to Jess Nevins' Encyclopedia of Golden Age Superheroes, "she fights white murderers from outside the jungle, a Lost City of Pharaonic cultists, white treasure-hunters in search of Lobengula's treasure, the tribe of U'bongo, the Leopard Queen, and so on".

== Publication history ==
Judy appeared as a regular backup feature in Exciting Comics, displacing Miss Masque. She soon began appearing on the covers, with art provided by Alex Schomburg. Some of Judy's stories featured early work by Frank Frazetta. Judy's last Golden Age appearance was in Exciting Comics #69 (September 1949).

AC Comics reprinted several of Judy's adventures in 1993 and 1999.
