= Lance Lewis, Space Detective =

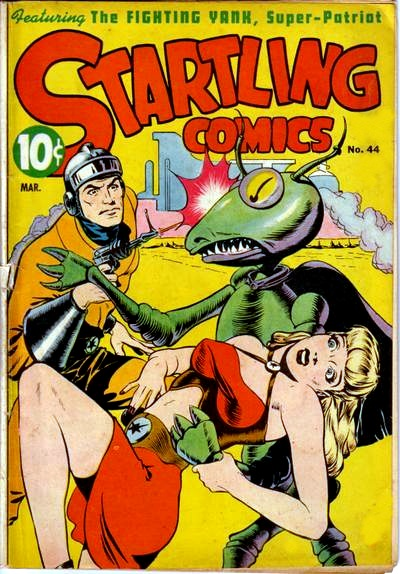
- Lance Lewis on the cover of Startling Comics #44. Art by Graham Ingels.

Publication information
- Publisher: Nedor Comics; America's Best Comics (DC)
- First appearance: Mystery Comics #3 (July 1944)

In-story information
- Alter ego: Lance Lewis
- Team affiliations: SMASH
- Abilities: No actual super powers, but was a scientific genius, who used his 22nd century knowledge to travel back in time, create ray guns, a jetpack to fly, and other high-tech gadgets to fight injustice. He was also athletic and skilled in hand-to-hand combat.

Lance Lewis, Space Detective is a superhero from the Golden Age of Comics. He first appeared in Mystery Comics #3 (1944), published by Nedor Comics. The character was revived by writer Alan Moore for America's Best Comics.

== Nedor Comics ==
Lance Lewis is a detective from the 22nd century. With his girlfriend Marna, Lance would solve mysteries involving Martians, rocket ships, and rayguns. According to Jess Nevins' Encyclopedia of Golden Age Superheroes, "with the help of his beautiful girlfriend Marna and his high-tech spaceship, Lewis fights telepathic amoebic Saturnian space pirates, alien crab men, and Anton Gregor, the Tyrant of Astra".

Lance Lewis's adventures debuted in Nedor's Mystery Comics, but later moved to Startling Comics, beginning with issue #44 (March 1947). No credits were given for the debut story; later stories were written and drawn by Graham Ingels and Bob Oksner Lance Lewis's last Golden Age appearance was in Startling Comics #53 (September 1948).

== America's Best Comics ==
Alan Moore revived Lance Lewis, along with many other Nedor Comics characters, for his Tom Strong series. In Tom Strong #12 (June 2001), Lance Lewis was given a new backstory. He had traveled back in time to take part in World War II, but found himself unable to return to his time. He became friends with Grant Halford (aka the Magnet), and the two of them joined SMASH. Lance Lewis was one of the members of SMASH that had been placed in suspended animation after an alien invasion from the Moon in 1969. Awakened 30 years later, Lance Lewis joined his former comrades in the fight against the alien. After SMASH disbanded, Lance and Halford opened The Magnet Detective Agency. Lance Lewis was killed three years later by Mystico (Terra Obscura #2, September 2003).
