= Death (comics) =

Death, in comics, may refer to:

== Characters ==
- The personification of death in comics:
  - Death (DC Comics)
  - Death (Marvel Comics)
- Death, a member of the Horsemen of Apocalypse
- Doctor Death (character), a DC Comics supervillain
- Lady Death, a Chaos! Comics, CrossGen Comics and Avatar Press character

== Other uses ==
- Comic book death, the deaths of characters in comic books
  - "The Death of Superman"
  - "The Death of Buffy"

== See also ==
- Death (disambiguation)
- Grim Reaper (Marvel Comics), a Marvel Comics supervillain and brother of Wonder Man
- Grim Reaper (Nedor Comics), a superhero from Nedor Comics
- Reaper (Marvel Comics), the name of multiple Marvel Comics characters
- Reaper (DC Comics), the name of multiple DC Comics characters
