= Doc Strange =

Golden Age comic book superhero by Nedor Comics

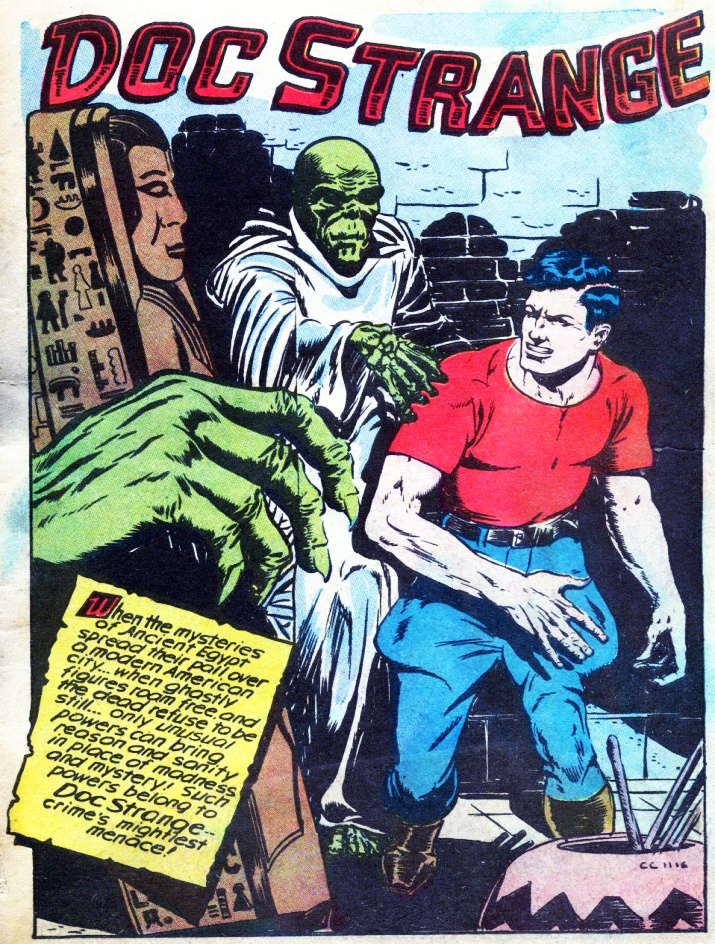
- Thrilling Comics #1

Publication information
- Publisher: AC Comics; Nedor Comics; America's Best Comics
- First appearance: Thrilling Comics #1 (February 1940)
- Created by: Richard E. Hughes; Alexander Kostuk

In-story information
- Alter ego: Doctor Thomas Hugo Strange
- Team affiliations: SMASH
- Notable aliases: Tom Strange
- Abilities: Scientific genius, super strength, flight, vacuum survival, super speed, invulnerability to bullets

Doc Strange is a Golden Age comic book superhero who originally appeared in Thrilling Comics #1 (Better Publications, also called Nedor Comics) in February 1940. The character continued in Thrilling Comics until issue #64 (Feb 1948). He also appeared in America's Best Comics #1-23 and 27.

Circa 2000, the character was revived and renamed 'Tom Strange' in Tom Strong #11 (published by America's Best Comics).

== Golden Age character history ==
Hugo Strange ("Dr. Strange", later "Doc Strange") is an American scientist who develops a serum called Alosun — described as a "distillate of sun atoms" — which when ingested gives him superhuman strength, the ability to fly, and invulnerability. Doc Strange is assisted by his girlfriend Virginia Thompson. In Thrilling Comics #24, he gains a teen sidekick, wealthy young wastrel Mike Ellis, who wears a costume identical to Strange's, along with a green cape. Though non-powered during the earlier adventures, Mike later gains the same powers as Doc Strange.

The character's name was "Doctor Strange" at first; his moniker changed to "Doc Strange" in issue #11 (Dec 1940).

According to Jess Nevins' Encyclopedia of Golden Age Superheroes, they confront villains like the Faceless Phantom (and his "delta ray gun"), the Yellow Peril Emperor (and his flame apes), and the black magic-empowered Mephisto.

== Revivals ==
=== AC Comics ===
Doc Strange was briefly revived in the pages of Femforce as part of the Vault Heroes, a group of Golden Age superheroes who volunteered to have themselves cryogenically frozen following World War II, so that they could be revived should the world need them. He died shortly after being unfrozen, making the heroes realize that the cryogenic process did not work perfectly on everyone.

AC Comics went on to reprint many of his Golden Age adventures in various anthologies.

=== Tom Strong ===
Doc Strange, along with other heroes from Nedor Comics, were revived by Alan Moore in his series Tom Strong. This revival set the characters on a parallel world called Terra Obscura, which was also the title of the resulting mini-series. The character was renamed "Thomas Hugo Strange" (or "Tom Strange"), presumably to set him apart from the Marvel Comics sorcerer Doctor Strange and Batman villain Hugo Strange, and to present him as a Terra Obscura version of Tom Strong.

In Tom Strong #11, Moore and co-creator Chris Sprouse more fully introduced the idea of Terra Obscura being a parallel Earth, "but in our own dimension. In our own galaxy". Tom Strong himself had found it while traveling space alone. He theorizes that the duplicate Earth (and duplicate solar system) "must be due to some near-inconceivable fluke of mathematics, of statistical probability".

In this issue, Tom Strange is revealed to have run across the Milky Way for 30 years to reach Strong for help in stopping an alien menace which killed or imprisoned most of the science-heroes of Terra Obscura. It is judged Strange had set off on his task soon after Tom had left. The stress of leaping from world to world temporarily drives Strange mad. He battles Tom before being subdued and sleeping—dreamlessly—for a fortnight. Once he awakens, he is of a much calmer mind. The two set off back home in Tom's new ship, Tom shows Strange an array of comic books, produced on his earth, which matches the history and events on Strange's Earth.

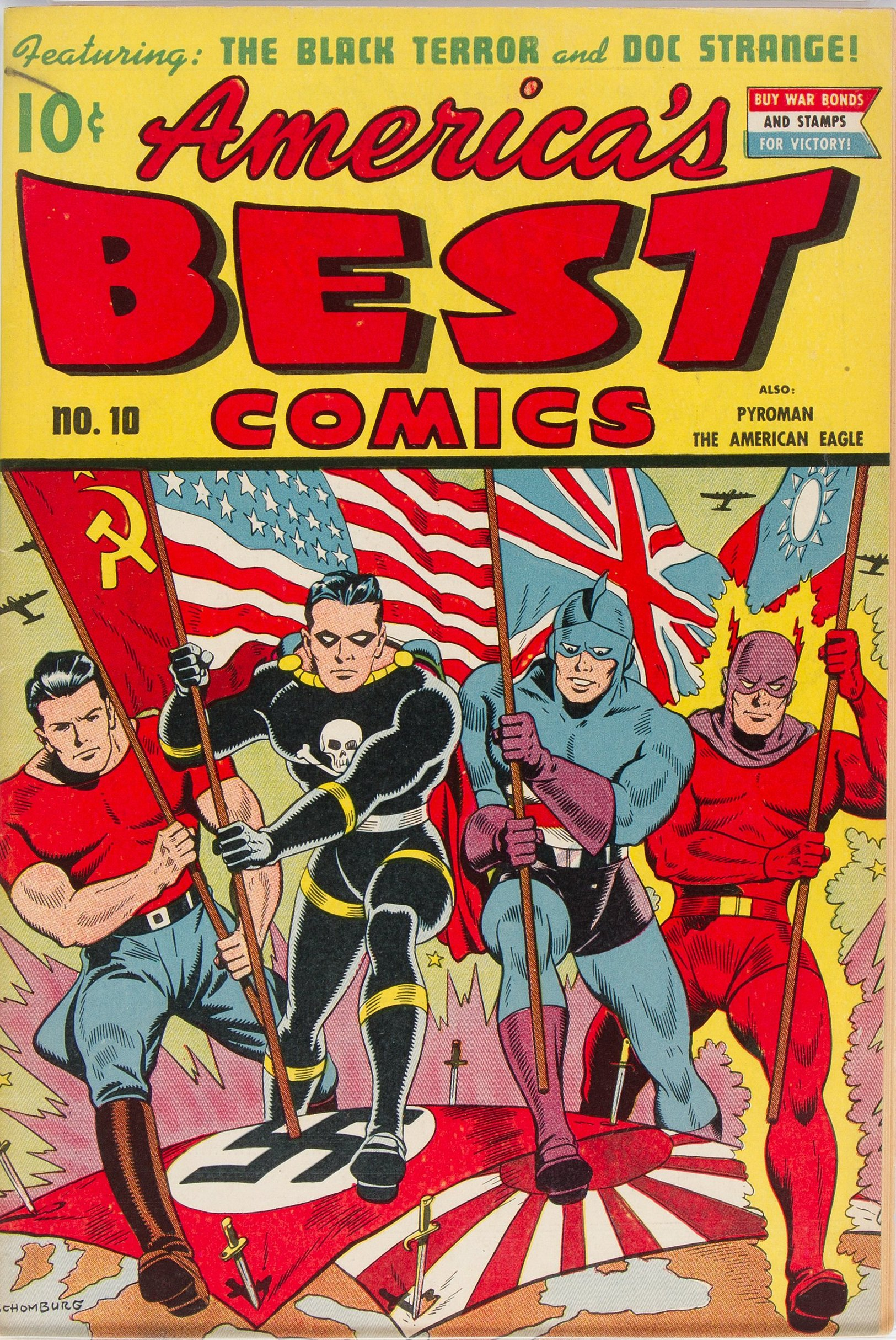
America's Best Comics #7, October 1943

Tom helps Strange revive his surviving allies, most of whom have been trapped in time by the alien menace for the thirty years, unaware and unaging. With the contents of a lab hidden deep in the inverted city of 'Invertica', the assembled superheroes manage to neutralize the alien menace.

He is described by Strong as the most powerful being he's ever met, and in a different league from Strong entirely.

He operates with the modern incarnation of SMASH.

In 2013, he appeared in limited series Tom Strong and the Planet of Peril by Vertigo.

=== Heroes, inc. ===
Doc Strange appears in the webcomic "Heroes, inc." along with a Golden Age Captain Future and Blue Beetle to save Diana Masters (Miss Masque) from an attack by futuristic soldiers. It's revealed in flashbacks that he is one of the scientists that were part of creating the original Golden Age heroes of World War II, under the direction of Archibald Masters (American Crusader). He developed a chemical called Alosun for the superhero project, but inspired by the heroes that they were creating, he tried it on himself first.

== Powers and abilities ==
Tom Strange is capable of flight (or at least vast Golden Age Superman-like leaps), superhuman strength, and surviving indefinitely in the vacuum of space (without air or water), and has invulnerability to re-entry, extreme impacts (falling to Earth from space) and bullets. He is also a scientist.
