= Captain Future (Nedor Comics) =

Nedor Comics superhero

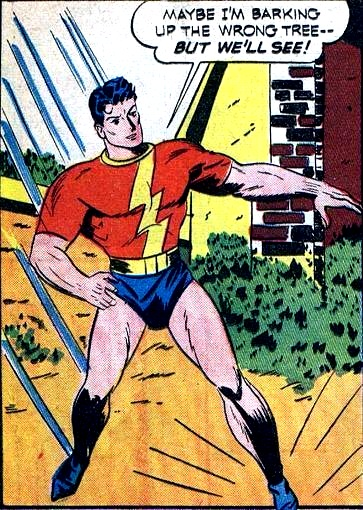
- Startling Comics #10 (Sep. 1941), art by Kin Platt.

Publication information
- Publisher: Nedor Comics
- First appearance: Startling Comics #1 (June 1940)
- Created by: Kin Platt

In-story information
- Alter ego: Andrew Bryant
- Abilities: Superhuman strength Flight; Energy bolt projection

Captain Future is a superhero (not to be confused with the pulp magazine character of the same name) who first appeared in Startling Comics #1 (June 1940) from Nedor Comics.

== Publishing history ==
Captain Future appeared in issues #1-40 of Startling Comics (June 1940 - July 1946). He also appeared in several issues of America's Best Comics.

In 2003, he appeared in AC Comics' Sentinels of America #1, along with Black Terror, Miss Masque, Fighting Yank, and The Scarab. In 2004 he appeared in Terra Obscura, Volume Two.

In 2008, Captain Future appeared in flashbacks in Dynamite Entertainment's miniseries Project Superpowers; in the one-shot Project Superpowers: Chapter Two Prelude, it was stated that he would appear in future issues in this line.

== Fictional biography ==
=== Nedor Comics ===
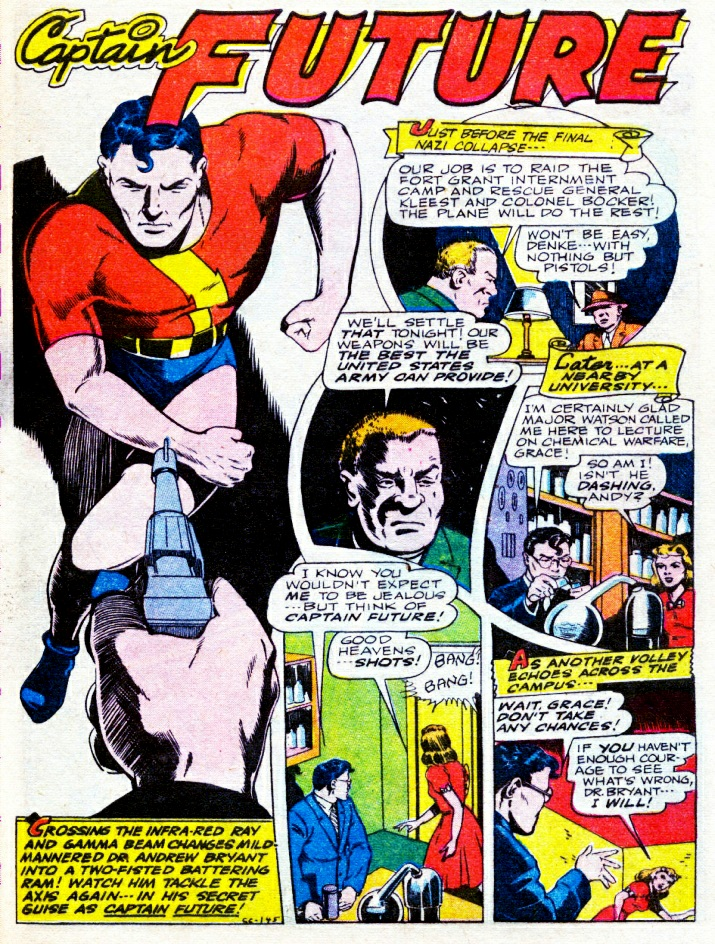
America's Best Comics #22, Page 43 June, 1947, art by Ken Battefield

In 1940, scientist Andrew Bryant discovers that bathing himself in a combination of gamma and infrared rays will grant him superpowers. He uses these powers to fight crime, with the help of his detective girlfriend, Grace Adams of the Agatha Detective Agency. While "powered up" Bryant is super-strong, can fly and hurl bolts of energy from his hands. Strong blows to the head, however, can render him unconscious, and he must frequently use his radiation machine to recharge his powers.

According to Jess Nevins' Encyclopedia of Golden Age Superheroes, "his enemies vary from German ("Nazonians") and Japanese agents to Dr. Allirog, a Moreau-like mad scientist who creates "fiendish monsters" and who transplanted his brain into the body of a bear with the head, hands and feet of a gorilla, to Dr. Bio, who creates horse-sized tarantulas with human faces, to kaiju-sized alligators".

=== Project Superpowers ===
At some point after World War II, Captain Future was trapped in the mystical Urn of Pandora by the misguided Fighting Yank, along with dozens of other heroes. Decades later, the Urn was broken and the heroes were freed.

In the second volume of Project Superpowers, it is revealed that Captain Future was actually the Greek god Zeus all along.

== Powers and abilities ==
After bathing himself in gamma and infrared rays, Captain Future gained superhuman strength, flight, and the ability to project energy bolts through his hands, although his powers are only temporary and he must expose himself to the radiation to recharge them.
