= Terror Twins =

Terror Twins may refer to:

== People ==
- Phil Collen and Steve Clark, of band Def Leppard
- Nikki Sixx and Tommy Lee, of band Mötley Crüe
- Damian Priest and Rhea Ripley, professional tag team wrestlers

== Fictional characters ==
- Tommy and Tuppence Terror, characters in the Young Justice TV series and related media
- Black Terror and his sidekick, comic book characters
