= Johnny Apollo =

Johnny Apollo may refer to:

- Johnny Apollo (film), a 1940 film starring Tyrone Power and Dorothy Lamour
- Johnny Apollo, a childhood friend and later enemy of comic book character Greyshirt
