= Ghost (Nedor Comics) =

Fictional superhero from the Golden Age of Comics

Publication information
- Publisher: Nedor Comics; America's Best Comics (DC)
- First appearance: Thrilling Comics #3 (April 1940)

In-story information
- Alter ego: George Chance
- Team affiliations: SMASH
- Notable aliases: The Green Ghost
- Abilities: Levitation; Astral projection Invisibility

The Ghost is a superhero that appeared in comic books published by Nedor Comics. His first appearance was in Thrilling Comics #3 (April 1940). The character is loosely based on the pulp hero created by G.T. Fleming-Roberts, who was variously known as the Ghost, the Ghost Detective, and the Green Ghost.

The character was later revived by writer Alan Moore for America's Best Comics.

== Nedor Comics ==
The Ghost's origin was revealed in his first appearance in Thrilling Comics. The Ghost is George Chance, an occult investigator. Years of studying the mystical arts have given him the power of levitation, astral projection, turning himself or others invisible, and other seemingly magical powers. The Ghost uses his powers to fight crime, which he does while accompanied by his wife, Betty.

According to Jess Nevins' Encyclopedia of Golden Age Superheroes, the Ghost's arch-enemy is "the evil (though not mad) scientist Dr. Fenton, who sends his kidnap victims (including America's greatest leaders) back to the Stone Age, and brings back monsters, villains, and women from the past. Chance also fights the super-hypnotist Dr. Volkan and Martians in a recap of Edgar Rice Burroughs' Barsoom novels".

The Ghost appeared as a backup feature in many issues of Thrilling Comics. His final Golden Age appearance was in issue #52 (February 1946).

== America's Best Comics ==
Alan Moore revived the Ghost, along with many other Nedor Comics characters, for his Tom Strong series. In Tom Strong #12 (June 2001), the Cavalier was revealed to have been a member of SMASH, a superhero team that had been placed in suspended animation after an alien invasion from the Moon in 1969. The Ghost was one of the heroes killed during that fight; however, thanks to his mystical powers he was able to remain in this reality in his astral form. He was revived 30 years later thanks to the efforts of Tom Strong. Now calling himself the Green Ghost, Chance reunited with his wife to continue his investigation of the paranormal. The Green Ghost has since joined the reunited SMASH.

Chance's widow later married science hero-turned detective Grant Halford (aka The Magnet).
