= Liberator (Nedor Comics) =

The Liberator
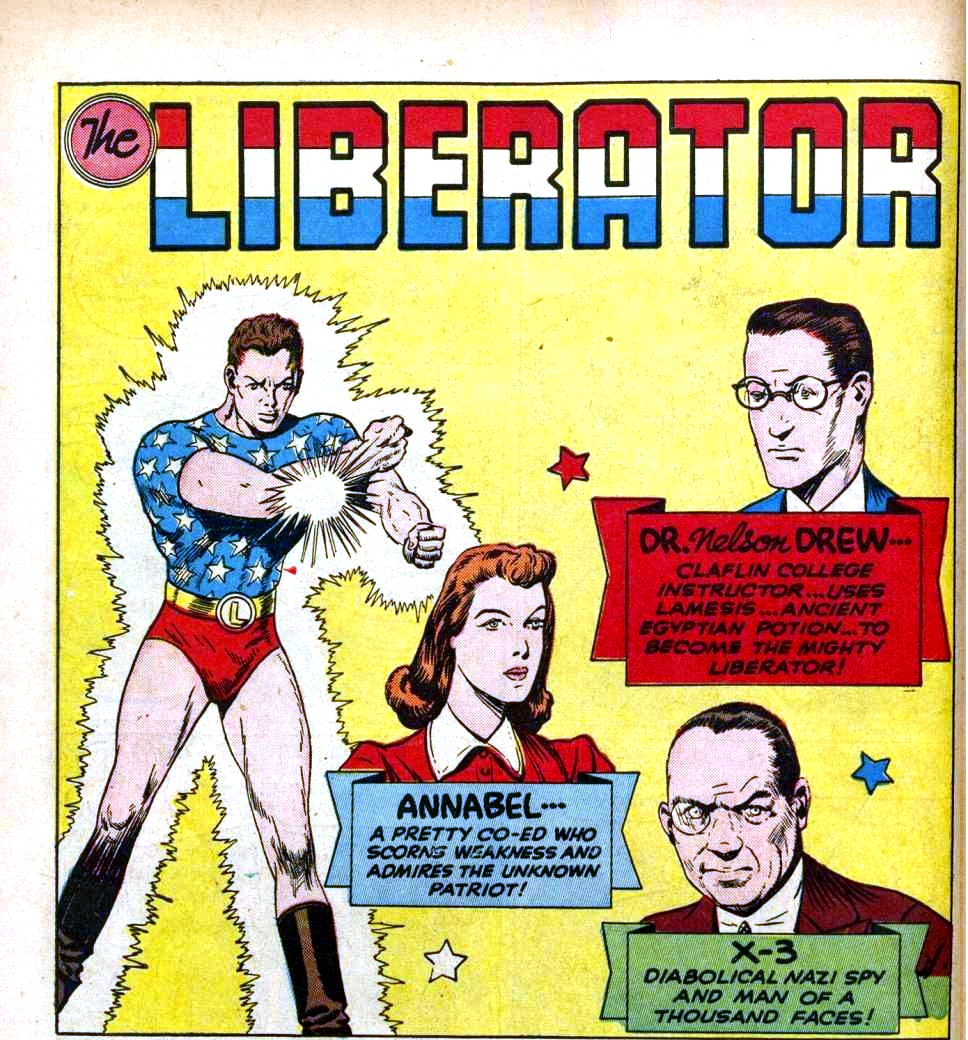

Publication information
- Publisher: Nedor Comics; America's Best Comics (DC)
- First appearance: Exciting Comics #15 (December 1941)

In-story information
- Alter ego: Dr. Nelson Drew
- Team affiliations: SMASH
- Abilities: Superhuman strength and speed

The Liberator is a superhero from the Golden Age of Comics. His first appearance was in Exciting Comics #15 (December 1941), published by Nedor Comics. The character was later revived by writer Alan Moore for America's Best Comics.

== Nedor Comics ==
The Liberator is the secret identity of Dr. Nelson Drew, a chemistry teacher at fictional Claflin University (as in, not to be confused with the historically black college affiliated with South Carolina State University). He discovers an ancient Egyptian formula called Lamesis that gives him superhuman strength and speed. Drew uses his powers as the Liberator to fight Nazi saboteurs during World War II. The formula sometimes wears off, turning the Liberator back into Dr. Drew at inopportune moments.

The Liberator debuted in Exciting Comics #15, and appeared regularly in that title and America's Best Comics (not to be confused with the later DC Comics imprint). His last Golden Age appearance was in Exciting Comics #35 (October 1944).

== America's Best Comics ==
Alan Moore revived the Liberator, along with many other Nedor Comics characters, for his Tom Strong series. In Tom Strong #12 (June 2001), the Liberator was revealed to have been one of the members of SMASH that had been placed in suspended animation after an alien invasion from the Moon in 1969. Awakened 30 years later, the Liberator joined his former comrades in the fight against the alien. SMASH disbanded shortly thereafter, but reformed three years later. The Liberator is a member of the reformed group.

== Dynamite Entertainment ==
Currently, The Liberator is one of dozens of Golden Age superhero characters appearing in Dynamite Entertainment's Project Superpowers line of comics. The basic premise is that The Fighting Yank spent years imprisoning all of his fellow heroes in the mystical Urn of Pandora, mistakenly thinking that it would bring about the end of all evil; The Liberator was one of those heroes. Decades later, the Urn was broken and the heroes freed. As seen in the Black Terror miniseries, The Liberator is now one of several patriotic-themed heroes who protect the U.S. president and America's interests, even if this pits them against their fellow heroes.

== See also ==
- Nedor Comics
