= George Mandel =

American writer (1920–2021)

George Mandel (11 February 1920 – 13 February 2021) was an American author and artist. His first novel Flee the Angry Strangers (1952) is considered to be an early work of the east coast Beat Generation. His novels, interviews, novellas, cartoons and short stories have been carried by major publishing houses, print magazines and collections. He was also active as a comic artist.

== Works ==
His first book, Flee the Angry Strangers (1952), was considered one of the first Beat novels. His subsequent works include The Breakwater (1960), a coming-of-age novel and Proustian examination of pre-war Coney Island; a 1961 war novella Into the Woods of the World, and The Wax Boom (1962), a war novel. His novella Scapegoats (1970) is a commentary on New York City's racial tension and urban renewal. He further explored the theme in Crocodile Blood (1985), an epic about the rape of a native American Seminole and the rising complex of cultures across three generations in Florida. His early short story "The Beckoning Sea" was included in the 1958 anthology Protest: The Beat Generation and the Angry Young Men.

His darkly humorous piece, "Adjustments", appeared in a 1963 Alfred Hitchcock horror anthology, and his short story "The Day the Time Changed" in a 1965 Saturday Evening Post. Also two of his cartoon books have been published: Beatville U.S.A. (1961) and Borderline Cases (1962). As a cartoonist, Mandel's inkings established the first (1940) masked female comicbook hero: The Woman in Red.

The National World War II Museum added to its collection his essay "Men Weep," which he wrote in September 2014, when he was 94. It is an account of his service and his reaction to the Battle of the Bulge.

== Personal life ==
Mandel was a native of New York City.

In 1968, he signed the "Writers and Editors War Tax Protest" pledge, vowing to refuse tax payments in protest against the Vietnam War.

He was a member of the Gourmet Club with Mel Brooks, and was friends with William Styron and was a childhood friend of Joseph Heller.

Mandel died New York City in February 2021, two days after turning 101.
