= Hilary Barta =

American comic book writer and artist

- Born: June 17, 1957 (age 69)
- Areas: Writer, artist

Hilary Barta (born June 17, 1957) is an American comic book writer and artist.

== Biography ==
Barta's first comics work came in June 1982, when he helped Marvel inkers Al Milgrom, Joe Sinnott and Sal Trapani provide inks for the pencils of Don Perlin on The Defenders #108. He inked #115 solo and then inked Dave Cockrum's artwork for a backup feature to the Giant Size X-Men #1-reprint X-Men Special Edition #1 in February 1983.

=== Marvel and First ===
Barta was the regular inker for most of the first 10 issues of John Byrne's The Thing during 1983–84, during-and-after which he moved from Marvel to First Comics to ink a couple of stories for their Warp comic (including some of the earliest work from Bill Willingham). Other inking work for First slowly saw Barta graduate from inks to pencils over a dozen issues of the John Ostrander-written Starslayer, while he also inked a couple of issues of Howard Chaykin's American Flagg! and drew back-ups for Mike Baron's Nexus. Barta also co-wrote and drew a number of stories for Munden's Bar, the back-up feature in Grimjack.

=== Eclipse and Plastic Man ===
Towards the end of 1986, Barta inked a couple of comics for Eclipse, including an issue of Airboy (#11), before heading back to Marvel to ink Power Pack and various issues of other titles for Eclipse, Marvel and First, notable among them Marvel's adaptation of the horror film House II: The Second Story (Oct 1987). Late 1988 saw Barta launch two series - Marvel's What The--?! and DC's 4-issue mini-series revival of Jack Cole's Plastic Man, on both as penciler rather than inker. His work has a distinctive cartoon-like feel, erring on the surreal and exaggerated side more than the often-realistic work found in other superhero comics. As a result, Barta's art style is very well suited to humor, and it is no surprise that his major non-inking art credits are on humor titles.

=== What Th--?! and Urban Legends ===
In 1989, Barta returned mostly to inking duties on Marvel's Alpha Flight and Power Pack, but was also one of several pencillers in their Marvel: Year in Review - 1989 (1990), alongside Bryan Hitch, Dale Keown, Bob McLeod, Mike Mignola, Herb Trimpe and Lee Weeks. From April to October 1990, he inked Rob Liefeld's art on Louise Simonson's The New Mutants, and over the next couple of years flitted between companies as penciller and inker, as well as writer and cover artist (in particular on What The--?!). In 1993, Barta co-wrote (with Doug Rice) and drew Stupid #1 for Image comics. He wrote, penciled, inked and lettered "The Winning Ticket" in Dark Horse Comics' June 1993 offering Urban Legends, and also contributed "The Wonder of Gas" to DC/Paradox Press's Big Book of Urban Legends in 1994. He inked for Malibu Comics and Image Comics (including Image-branded issues of Jim Lee's WildStorm title StormWatch) and provided stories for further volumes of Paradox Press' Big Book of series in 1996/7/8.

=== Elseworlds & America's Best ===
Also in 1998, he inked penciller Kieron Dwyer's artwork on two Elseworlds titles, both written by John Francis Moore: Elseworld's Finest #1-2 (set in the 1920s) and Superman: The Dark Side #1-3 (Superman as raised on Apokolips by Darkseid). In March 2000 he fully illustrated the first of several Splash Brannigan story in Alan Moore's America's Best Comics anthology title Tomorrow Stories, and later contributed to Moore's Tom Strong #14 and the ABC Sketchbook (Dec 2001). Around this time, Barta also wrote and/or illustrated short stories for Bongo Comics' Simpsons Comics and Treehouse of Horror titles, before moving back largely to inking duties for Rick Remender and Dark Horse Comics on Bruce Campbell's The Man with the Screaming Brain.

=== Current work ===
June 2006 saw him work with Remender again, writing back-ups for the latter's Fear Agent comic, and since then he has mostly contributed in various ways to the many different Simpsons titles. He also inked for Teenage Mutant Ninja Turtles comics/magazines for Mirage Comics and Titan Magazines. In 2009, he illustrated the Loathsome Lore feature in Creepy #1 for the book's revival at Dark Horse Comics, and in the fourth issue drew "Zombie Wedding at Slaughter Swamp", written by longtime comics writer Nicola Cuti. In 2011 Barta began drawing a series of stories for SpongeBob Comics.

== Bibliography ==
Comics work includes:

- New Mutants vol. 1 #88-91, 93-94 (inker)
- New Mutants Annual #5, 7 (inker)
- The Thing (1983-86 series) #3-8 (inker)
- Uncanny X-Men #243 (Inferno)
