= Tomorrow Stories =

American comic book series

- The 8th issue

Publication information
- Publisher: America's Best Comics
- Format: Ongoing series
- Genre: Superhero
- Publication date: 1999–2002
- No. of issues: 12
- Main character(s): Cobweb; First American; Greyshirt; Jack B. Quick; Splash Brannigan

Creative team
- Written by: Alan Moore
- Artist(s): Melinda Gebbie; Jim Baikie; Rick Veitch; Kevin Nowlan; Hilary Barta

Collected editions
- Book 1: ISBN 1-56389-660-5
- Book 2: ISBN 1-4012-0165-2

Tomorrow Stories is an American comic book series created by Alan Moore for his America's Best Comics (ABC) line, published by WildStorm (now a subsidiary of DC Comics).

== Overview ==
Tomorrow Stories started in August 1999 as a collection of short stories featuring the same characters (one or two) every issue. Many of these characters were often inspired by pulp magazine and comic book archetypes, such as the boy genius and the masked detective. They include:

- Cobweb – created by Moore and Melinda Gebbie
- First American – created by Moore and Jim Baikie
- Greyshirt – created by Moore and Rick Veitch
- Jack B. Quick – created by Moore and Kevin Nowlan
- Splash Brannigan – created by Moore and Hilary Barta

== Issues ==
=== Individual comics ===
| Issue | Publication date | Characters featured |
|---|---|---|
| 1 | 4 August 1999 | Cobweb, First American, Greyshirt, Jack B. Quick |
| 2 | 9 September 1999 | Cobweb, First American, Greyshirt, Jack B. Quick |
| 3 | 20 October 1999 | Cobweb, First American, Greyshirt, Jack B. Quick |
| 4 | 24 November 1999 | Cobweb, First American, Greyshirt, Jack B. Quick |
| 5 | 29 December 1999 | Cobweb, First American, Greyshirt |
| 6 | 9 February 2000 | Cobweb, First American, Greyshirt, Splash Brannigan |
| 7 | 12 April 2000 | Cobweb, First American, Greyshirt, Splash Brannigan |
| 8 | 15 November 2000 | Cobweb, First American, Greyshirt, Splash Brannigan |
| 9 | 28 December 2000 | Cobweb, First American, Greyshirt, Splash Brannigan |
| 10 | 18 April 2001 | Cobweb, First American, Greyshirt, Jack B. Quick |
| 11 | 29 August 2001 | Cobweb, First American, Greyshirt, Splash Brannigan |
| 12 | 27 February 2002 | Cobweb, First American, Greyshirt, Jack B. Quick |

=== 64-page specials ===
| Issue | Publication date | Characters featured |
|---|---|---|
| 1 | 26 October 2005 | Cobweb, Jack B. Quick, Greyshirt, Splash Brannigan and Jonni Future |
| 2 | 8 March 2006 | America's Best (Promethea, Tom Strong, Splash Brannigan, Fancy O'Keefe and Johnny Future), First American, Jonni Future and Little Margie |

=== Collected editions ===
The series has been collected into two volumes:

- Book 1 collects issues #1–6 (hardback: ISBN 1-56389-660-5, paperback: ISBN 1-56389-985-X).
- Book 2 collects issues #7–12 (hardback: ISBN 1-4012-0165-2, paperback: ISBN 1-4012-0166-0).

== Awards ==
- 2000: Won "Best Anthology" Eisner Award
