= Dodgem Logic =

UK magazine

Dodgem Logic was a bimonthly underground magazine edited and published by Alan Moore, which published eight issues from January 2010 to April 2011. Each issue featured comics, stories, and articles by Moore, including the regular feature "Great Hipsters in History". The general tone of the magazine was irreverent and subversive, after the manner of The East Village Other and the National Lampoon. Regular artists and writers included Dave Hamilton, Kevin O'Neill, Steve Aylett, Josie Long and LeJorne Pindling.

The first issue included a CD titled Nation of Saints: 50 Years of Northampton Music. Included with the second issue, as an insert, was an eight-page Alan Moore comic book, Astounding Weird Penises.

According to Cory Doctorow, "The mere fact that the Great Bearded Wizard of Albion, Mr Alan Moore, is behind a new journal, Dodgem Logic, should be enough to get a lot of us interested. But add in talents like the Josie Long, Graham Linehan, Kev O'Neill, Melinda Gebbie, Steve Aylett and others and I'm pretty much sold and I'd imagine so are most of us." Wired magazine describes Dodgem Logic as "an engaging, educational and often hilarious read".
