= Black Terror =

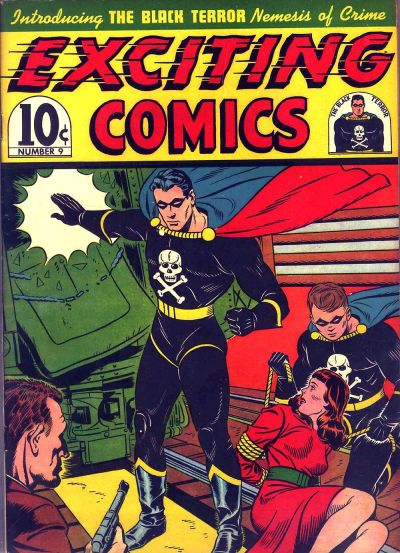
- Cover to Exciting Comics #9, art by Elmer Wexler.

Publication information
- Publisher: Nedor Comics; America's Best Comics; Dynamite Entertainment
- First appearance: Exciting Comics #9 (Jan. 1941)
- Created by: Richard E. Hughes; Don Gabrielson

In-story information
- Alter ego: Bob Benton
- Team affiliations: SMASH
- Abilities: Super strength Limited invulnerability

The Black Terror is a comic book superhero debuting in Exciting Comics #9, published by Nedor Comics in January 1941. The character was popular and, on the strength of the Black Terror's sales, Nedor made Exciting Comics a monthly magazine starting with issue #11 (July 1941).

The Black Terror was the most popular superhero in Nedor's stable, and appeared in a quarterly solo comic book as well as the lead feature in America's Best Comics and Exciting Comics until 1949.

Some Black Terror stories were written by Patricia Highsmith before she became an acclaimed novelist. The character has been revived by various publishers over the years, including AC Comics, Eclipse Comics, America's Best Comics, and Dynamite Entertainment.

== Exciting Comics ==
The Black Terror's secret identity was pharmacist Bob Benton, who formulated a chemical he called "formic ethers", which gave him various superpowers. He used these powers to fight crime with his sidekick, Tim Roland, together known as the "Terror Twins". His love interest is secretary Jean Starr, who initially despises Benton and loves the Black Terror, but later discovers that they are the same person.

According to Jess Nevins' Encyclopedia of Golden Age Superheroes, "The Black Terror has enemies ranging from Nazis to mad scientists like Thorg (he of the "million dollar death ray"), the femme fatale Lady Serpent (who has a hypnotic glance), and the Japanese scientist Hanura and his "electro-hypnotizer", which is used to assassinate American generals and admirals".

With the popularity of superheroes fading in the late 40s, the Black Terror's series ended with issue #27 (June 1949).

== Later appearances ==
=== AC Comics ===
In 1983, AC Comics revised the Black Terror, starting in their Americomics title. In it, now-retired Bob Benton (called Mark Benton in this version) returns to action after an attempt to shake him down for protection money leads to the death of his wife. He would operate as an over-the-top vigilante, now just called the "Terror". Later, most likely due to trademark issues, he became a criminal enforcer known as the "Terrorist".

=== Alter Ego ===
In Roy Thomas' Alter Ego mini-series from 1986, several Golden Age characters were used, but renamed. The Black Terror (renamed "The Holy Terror") made an appearance.

=== Darkline Comics ===
Bob Benton made a single appearance in the fourth issue of Darkline Comics' Dark Adventures. In the script by Vic Peterson and art by Thompson O'Rourke, Benton's exposure to his secret formula has made him ageless and sleepless, and he begins a new war on crime under the name "Terror Knight".

=== Eclipse Comics ===
Eclipse Comics did a three-issue mini-series "revival" of the Black Terror in 1989. In this series, the character is an undercover FBI agent operating against organized crime who would dress up like the Black Terror for certain operations. He had no superpowers or any connection to the original character.

=== America's Best Comics ===
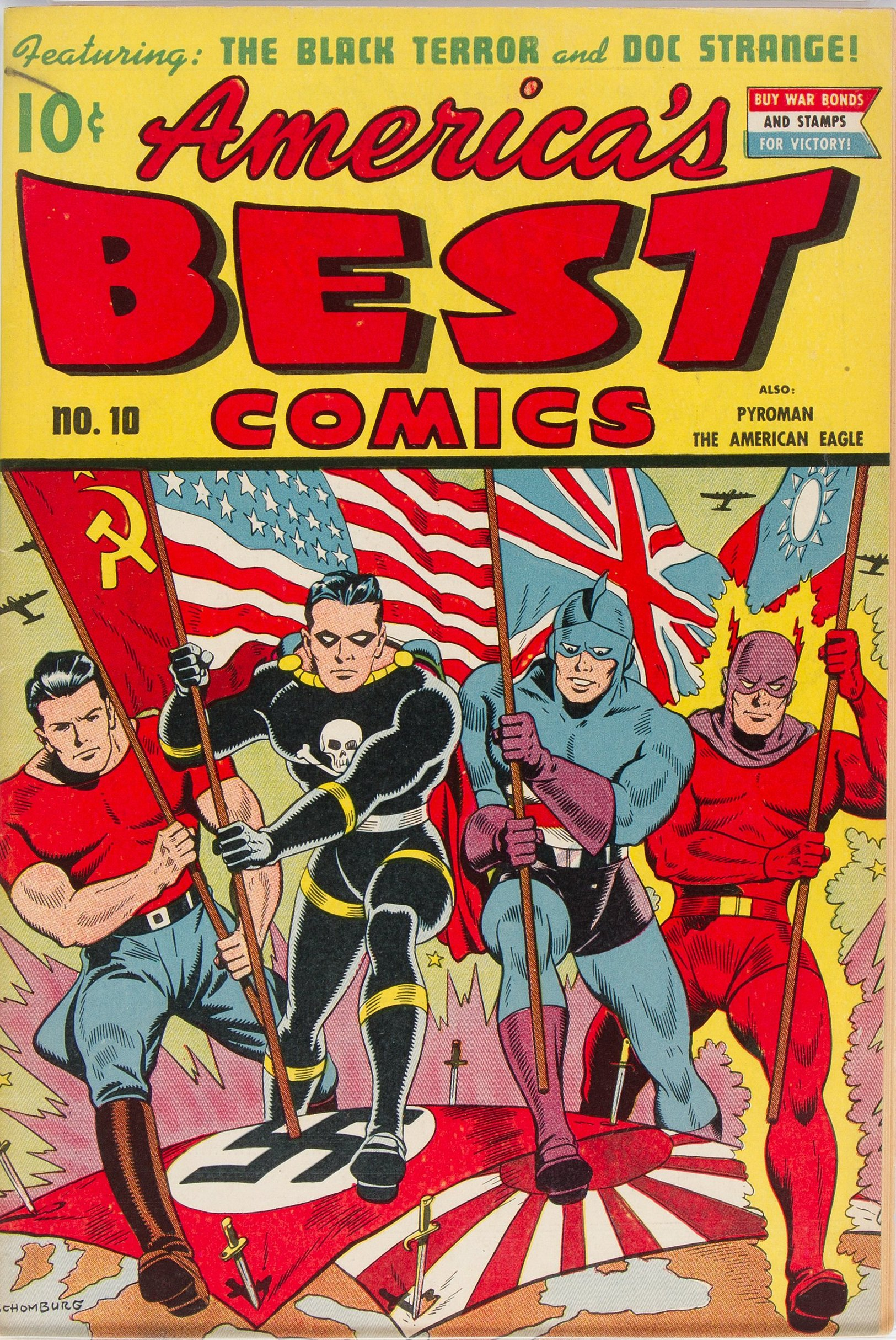
America's Best Comics #7, October 1943

The Black Terror, along with other heroes from Nedor Comics, were revived by Alan Moore in 2001 in his series Tom Strong, published by America's Best Comics. This revival set the characters on a parallel world called Terra Obscura, which was also the title of the resulting mini-series.

In Tom Strong #11, Moore and co-creator Chris Sprouse more fully introduce the idea of Terra Obscura being a parallel Earth, "but in our own dimension. In our own galaxy". In this issue, Tom Strange is revealed to have run across the Milky Way for 30 years to reach Strong for help in stopping an alien menace that killed or imprisoned most of the science heroes of Terra Obscura. Strong himself theorized that the duplicate Earth "must be due to some near-inconceivable fluke of mathematics, of statistical probability".

The parallel Earth, as revealed by Strange, was formed much as our own, except that once Earth had completely formed, something large collided and combined with it — a vast spacecraft. The pilot of the spacecraft survived in the Moon, until awakened by astronauts on July 20, 1969. It apparently followed them back to Earth, where it began construction of a ship to return home — by converting the entire Earth into a spaceship. In the process, it was engaged in battle by the members of SMASH. It killed some members, and trapped others in suspended animation for 30 years, until freed by the combined efforts of Tom Strong and Tom Strange.

In Tom Strong #12, it is revealed that the Black Terror had been killed in battle with the alien. However, Benton, a polymath, had transferred his consciousness into a computer program called Terror 2000.

In the Terra Obscura series, the Terror 2000 program institutes a crime prevention program in Invertica City, wherein technologically produced versions of the Black Terror (referred to as the Terror) fight crime. A corporation running the program tries to sell it to other cities in the US. Eventually, the Terror transfers its consciousness into the now deceased Tim and tries to acquire power from the returning Captain Future's spaceship. He is defeated by a time travelling version of his original self, the Black Terror.

=== Image Comics ===
The Black Terror is seen in the Mike Allred illustrated "Stardust the Super Wizard" story in Image Comics' Next Issue Project #1 (also known as Fantastic Comics #24, January 2008). He can be seen with many other notable Golden Age characters, including Daredevil, Miss Masque, the Green Lama, the Face, the Phantom, the Fighting Yank, and Samson, who headlines the book. He also made a small appearance on the cover and in some panels of Savage Dragon #141 (November 2008).

=== Wild Cat Books ===
In June 2008, pulp publisher Wild Cat Books released Legends of the Golden Age, a prose anthology featuring new stories of the Black Terror and Lev Gleason's Daredevil.

=== Dynamite Entertainment ===
Black Terror was one of several Golden Age characters to appear in the comic book series Project Superpowers, by writer Jim Krueger and artist Alex Ross. He was also the first in the series to get a spin-off series, written by Krueger with art by Mike Lilly. In the Black Terror series, which began in November 2008, the Terror leads a one-man assault on the White House in search of his lost partner, Tim. The series was cancelled at #14 in 2011. The character appears in the 2013 Masks series along other pulp heroes. He again had a solo series in 2019 entitled Black Terror which consisted of 5 issues unrelated to his previous Dynamite versions.

=== Metahuman Press ===
The 2009 Metahuman Press serial Out for Vengeance uses both the Black Terror and Black Fury as a basis for the character. He maintains the traditional secret identity and costume. The series is set in the modern day and involves Robert Benton suddenly finding himself young and semi-amnesiac in the city of New Salem.

=== Heroes Inc. ===
The webcomic Heroes Inc. started in 2009 and takes place in an alternate reality where the allies of World War II lost the war. In present day, the American Crusader gathers DNA from Golden Age heroes in order to create a new generation of heroes. One of these Golden Age heroes is the Black Terror (now going by the alias Duncan Boone), who is currently on death row for first degree murder.

=== Curse of the Black Terror ===
In February 2011, Broken Soul Press launched a webcomic called Curse of the Black Terror. The comic is described as a superhero/noir story. The webcomic follows a re-imagined version of the Black Terror. Writer Curtis Lawson has stated that the story keeps the original Black Terror's history mostly intact and that his new Black Terror is a Legacy Hero. This new Black Terror features a new costume, but the same powers as the original. His identity has not been revealed. The visual re-design of the Black Terror in this webcomic was the work of artist Kundo Krunch.

=== Moonstone Books ===
In 2011, Eric M. Esquivel and Ander Sarabia created a version of The Black Terror called "The Blackest Terror", who is more of an urban revolutionary, obsessed with social justice, than a status-quo-enforcing superhero. Theirs is the first version of Robert Benton to be portrayed as an African-American. Blackest Terror also appears in their book Thor: Unkillable Thunder Christ, also published by Moonstone Books.

== Film ==
The Black Terror appears alongside other Golden Age superheroes in the 2010 independent film Avenging Force: The Scarab, played by John E. McLenachan..

In 2025, filmmaker Chris .R. Notarile released THE BLACK TERROR, a subversive ode to 1930's serials, starring Tom Proprofsky as the caped hero.
