= Woman in Red (comics) =

Fictional character

The Woman in Red
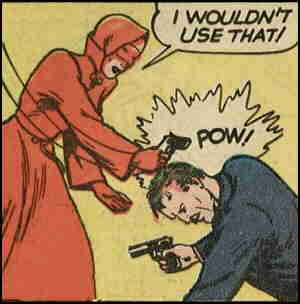
- Panel from Thrilling Comics.

Publication information
- Publisher: Nedor Comics; America's Best Comics
- First appearance: Thrilling Comics #2 (March 1940)
- Created by: Richard E. Hughes (writer); George Mandel (artist)

In-story information
- Alter ego: Peggy Allen
- Team affiliations: SMASH
- Abilities: Originally: Skilled hand to hand combatant and markswoman America's Best Comics: Flight; Energy projection

The Woman in Red is a fictional character that first appeared in the period known to comic book historians as the Golden Age of Comic Books. Created by writer Richard E. Hughes and artist George Mandel, she first appeared in Thrilling Comics #2 (March 1940), published by Nedor Comics. The character was later revived by writer Alan Moore for America's Best Comics. She would also be used by Dynamite Entertainment in Project Superpowers Chapter Two.

== Nedor Comics ==
The Woman in Red is the secret identity of policewoman Peggy Allen. Frustrated by the limitations of her job, Peggy creates a secret identity. As the Woman in Red, she wears a red, floor-length coat, hood, and mask. Among her opponents are the Spirit Killer, and cultists of the African death god Voa.

The Woman in Red made her debut in Thrilling Comics #2 (March 1940). Comics historian Trina Robbins has identified the Woman in Red as the first masked female crime fighter, preceding such better known characters as Wonder Woman, Phantom Lady, and Mary Marvel, with Fantomah, who debuted one month earlier, being one of the earliest superheroines. While the Woman in Red never made a cover appearance, she continued to appear regularly in issues of Thrilling Comics. Her last Golden Age appearance was in issue #46 (February 1945).

== Appearance ==
In the original 1940 comics, when working as a police officer, Peggy Allen is very rarely depicted in any sort of uniform. Instead, she wears fairly modest but smart clothes, such as a shirt and skirt. She styles her ginger hair in a bob cut just above her shoulders. When she becomes the Woman in Red, she dons a floor-length red coat with a hood and red domino mask and a pair of red heels. Through her revivals in various other comics, her outfit remains very similar.

== AC Comics ==
In 1990, the Woman in Red was revived by AC Comics in issue #29 of Femforce.

== Dynamite Entertainment ==
Dynamite used the character first in Project Superpowers Chapter Two, where she is shown teaming up with Miss Masque and Lady Satan. This team is explored more in the comic called Scarlett Sisters released in 2022.

== America's Best Comics ==
Alan Moore revived the Woman in Red, along with many other Nedor Comics characters, for his Tom Strong series. In Tom Strong #11 (January 2001), the Woman in Red is revealed to be a member of SMASH, a superhero team that had been placed in suspended animation after an alien invasion from the Moon in 1969. She is revived 30 years later thanks to the efforts of Tom Strong. SMASH disbands shortly thereafter. When SMASH reforms three years later, the Woman in Red rejoins the team.

Moore also changed the Woman in Red's history for this revival. Sometime after World War II, the Woman in Red came into the possession of a mysterious ruby crystal. This crystal gives her the powers of flight and energy projection. Prolonged contact with the crystal eventually turns her skin a shade of crimson. At first embarrassed by her skin color, she begins wearing a leather costume that covers her from head to toe. She eventually comes to terms with her condition and adopts a costume resembling a one-piece bathing suit.

== Powers and abilities ==
Originally, the Woman in Red had no superpowers but was a skilled hand-to-hand combatant and markswoman. When revived by ABC, after coming into possession of a ruby crystal, the Woman in Red acquires the ability to fly and project energy. Her body is turned into a shade of crimson after prolonged exposure with the crystal.

== Film ==
The Woman in Red appears alongside other Golden Age superheroes in the 2010 independent film Avenging Force: The Scarab, portrayed by Alix Pasquet.
