= Pyroman =

Nedor Comics superhero

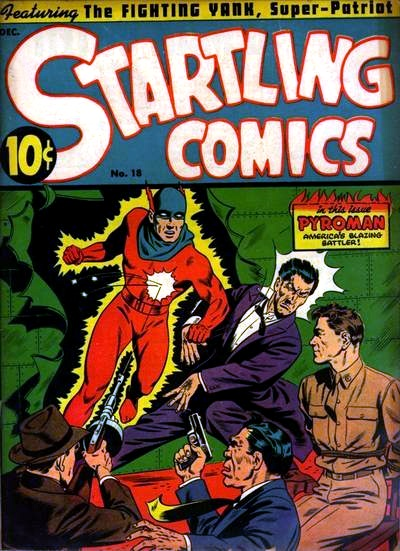
- Pyroman on the cover of Startling Stories #18

Publication information
- Publisher: Nedor Comics; AC Comics
- First appearance: Startling Comics #18 (December 1942)
- Created by: Jack Binder

In-story information
- Alter ego: Dick Martin
- Team affiliations: SMASH
- Abilities: Summon electricity Transmit electrical bolts Magnetize metal Electrical force field generation Electromagnetic pulses Flight via magnetic currents and radio waves

Pyroman is a superhero that appeared in comic books published by Nedor Comics. His first appearance was in Startling Comics #18 (December 1942), with art by Jack Binder. This character was later revived by both AC Comics and America's Best Comics.

== Nedor Comics ==
Pyroman is the secret identity of research student Dick Martin. Due to his work with high voltage electricity, his body develops the ability to store electrical current. He discovers this ability after he's framed for murder by a saboteur, and sentenced to die in the electric chair. After clearing his name, he decides to use his powers to fight crime.

According to Jess Nevins' Encyclopedia of Golden Age Superheroes, "Pyroman fights evil men like Venomi and his Black Boas, Schneubel (who uses a weapon to recreate Mars' environment in America), Dr. Fosfor and his semi-sentient living flame, and would-be world-conqueror Dr. Zucca and his city-destroying Tornado".

Pyroman appeared in numerous Nedor Comics titles during the 1940s. His last Golden Age Appearance was in America's Best Comics (no relation to the DC Comics imprint) #29 (January 1949). Many of his cover appearances were drawn by artist Alex Schomburg.

== AC Comics ==
Pyroman was one of the many Nedor Comics' characters revived by AC comics in the late 1990s. AC Comics reprinted Startling Comics #23 as Golden-Age Men of Mystery #9 (August 1998). His sole original appearance was in a new story written for All-Hero Retro Comics Annual #1 (1998).

== America's Best Comics ==
Alan Moore used Pyroman, along with many other Nedor Comics characters, for his Tom Strong series. In Tom Strong #12 (June 2001), Pyroman was revealed to have been a member of SMASH, a superhero team that had been placed in suspended animation after an alien invasion from the Moon in 1969 and revived 30 years later thanks to the efforts of Tom Strong. SMASH disbanded shortly thereafter. When SMASH reformed three years later, Pyroman rejoined the team.

== Dynamite Entertainment ==
In 2007, Pyroman was again one of several Golden Age characters used, this time in Dynamite Entertainment's Project Superpowers written by Jim Krueger and drawn by Alex Ross.
