= Jonni Future =

- Jonni Future, as realized by Arthur Adams.

Publication information
- Publisher: America's Best Comics
- First appearance: Tom Strong's Terrific Tales #1
- Created by: Steve Moore; Arthur Adams

In-story information
- Alter ego: Jonni Ray
- Abilities: No superhuman abilities, but is intelligent and brave. Possesses a universal translator helmet, a fish-shaped spaceship and a ray gun along with other 'pulp style' equipment.

Jonni Future is a fictional comic book heroine, who appeared in the pages of Tom Strong's Terrific Tales, a series published under writer Alan Moore's America's Best Comics line of comic books for WildStorm Comics. The stories were written by Steve Moore (no relation) and most of them were illustrated by Arthur Adams.

== Concept ==
Jonni Future was created in 2002 by writer Steve Moore and artist Arthur Adams, as a pastiche of a pulp science fiction series like Adam Strange and Barbarella. It was published in eight-page installments in the America's Best Comics anthology Tom Strong's Terrific Tales, the first ten issues of which Adams penciled from 2002 to 2004. Adams' work on "Jonni Future" has been characterized as exhibiting a romantic influence, with greater amounts realism and fine hatching, which Adams refers to as "noodling". Adams says he was inspired by sources such as Paolo Eleuteri Serpieri, Warren Publishing's Vampirella, and the character designs in Capcom video game character books when he drew "Jonni Future", and refrained from using straight edges or templates in order to achieve a more elegant, hand-drawn appearance. Adams drew the first three chapters of "Jonni Future" at twice the printed comic size, and also drew the fifth chapter, "The Garden of the Sklin", at a size larger than standard, in order to render more detail than usual in those stories. He regards "Jonni Future" as his best work.

Despite the well-endowed character's incredulity at the idea that her uncle intended her to wear the revealing costume that she wears in the series, Jonni nonetheless accepts her role as an adventurer, with much of the plots centering on or making mention of her attractive nature, or barely clothed damsels in distress in general. For example, in the second installment, "Moth Women of the Myriad Moons", Jonni battles a swarm of creatures with greatly exaggerated female characteristics like her own. In the third chapter, "The Seraglio of the Stars", Jonni is captured with the intent of making her a sex slave, but escapes with a plan in which she and the other slaves use their sexuality against their captors, one that includes Jonni being briefly nude.

In the fourth story, "The Witch of the World's End", a group of 16th century Christian witch-hunters are transported into the future, and encounter a city whose motifs indicate a liberated view of sexuality and nudity, causing them to conclude that they have reached the literal "end of the world", and that Jonni Future is a witch.

== Fictional character biography ==
Jonni's uncle came and went at his pleasure from the 20th century to the Crepusculum, a time billions of years in the future when the whole solar system teeters on the brink of collapse and several planets have already disintegrated in a maelstrom of asteroids. He made these journeys via a portal located in his home.

After his death, he leaves his home to his ethnobotanist niece, Jonni. She inherits the house, she learns, on the condition that she keep it, and resell it to no one. In her first night in the house (which is intended to resemble Norman Bates' house from the film Psycho), she finds her uncle's old magazines and starts reading about his fanciful exploits. Jonni encounters Jermaal Van Pavane, an anthropomorphic cheetah, who crossed from the pulp universe via a dimensional bridge in the attic. He brings her back to her uncle's old lair, explains to her the truth about him. Jermaal becomes her sidekick in the campy action, explaining that her uncle wished her to take up his mantle as a hero and protector of the Grand Array, the fantastic universe he lost his life defending. His legacy to Jonni includes trappings like the fish-shaped spaceship Coelacanth, a war suit and a "universal translator" helmet that enable Jonni to communicate with Jermaal and other aliens.

== Issues ==
- Tom Strong's Terrific Tales: Book One, issues #1-6 (hardcover: ISBN 1-4012-0030-3, paperback: ISBN 1-4012-0029-X)
- Tom Strong's Terrific Tales: Book Two, issues #7-12 (hardcover: ISBN 1-4012-0615-8, paperback: ISBN 1-4012-3265-5)

Tomorrow Stories 64-page specials

- Special #1 (26 October 2005)
- Special #2 (8 March 2006)
