= Steve Aylett =

English author

- Born: 1967 (age 58–59); Bromley, England
- Occupation: Novelist
- Writing career
- Period: 1994–
- Genres: Satirical science fiction, fantasy, and slipstream
- Website: www.steveaylett.com

Steve Aylett (born 1967 in Bromley, United Kingdom) is an English author of satirical science fiction, fantasy, and slipstream. According to the critic Bill Ectric, "much of Aylett’s work combines the bawdy, action-oriented style of Voltaire with the sedentary, faux cultivated style of Peacock." Stylistically, Aylett is often seen as a difficult writer. As the critic Robert Kiely suggests, his books tend to be "baroque in their density, speed, and finely crafted detail; they are overcrowded, they dazzle and distort and wait for us to catch up with their narrative world."

Although Aylett is best known for his novels, and for his transmedial metafiction Lint, he has also created comics, stand-up, performance, music, movies, and art, often working in appropriative and other avant-garde modes. Aylett is also one of the few UK authors associated with the largely US-based Bizarro literary movement.

== Writing ==
=== Beerlight ===
Aylett's Beerlight series includes the novels The Crime Studio (1994), Slaughtermatic (1997), Atom (2000) and Novahead (2011), as well as shorter fiction such as "The Siri Gun" (1998) and "Shifa" (1999). The setting of these works has been described as a "cyber-noir vision of a near-future metropolis with a comic-book aesthetic" and as "a crime-ridden urban-noir hell inhabited by a menagerie of grotesque, amoral characters and surreal, mind-bending technology."

Stylistically, the Beerlight series "marries the cyberpunk vision of William Gibson’s Sprawl trilogy or Neal Stephenson’s Snow Crash, William S. Burroughs’ talent for utterly weird but comprehensible description, and the hardboiled stylings of Raymond Chandler or Elmore Leonard." Aylett's Slaughtermatic is name checked in My Chemical Romance's "Danger Days: The True Lives of the Fabulous Killjoys", an album apparently inspired by the novel.

=== Accomplice ===
Only an Alligator (2001), The Velocity Gospel (2002), Dummyland (2002), and Karloff's Circus (2004) are set in Accomplice, a suburb on a tropical peninsula in a perhaps nuclear-blasted future, underneath which live demons; Aylett says he is in the tradition of "real satirists" such as Voltaire, Jonathan Swift and Mark Twain. The four books are collected in The Complete Accomplice (2010).

=== Jeff Lint ===
Lint (2005) is a satirical, Zelig-like biography of an imaginary author. The book traces Jeff Lint's career through thinly disguised satires on a number of well-known writers from the late 20th century, including Philip K. Dick, Hunter S. Thompson and Ken Kesey. As Paul Di Filippo remarks, Jeff Lint's work is sometimes not dissimilar to Aylett's. Jeff Lint is also a transmedial creation, incorporating a comic, The Caterer #3 (2008), purportedly written by Jeff Lint; a spoof Wikipedia page; a spoof collection of academic essays on Lint's work, And Your Point Is? (2014); and a mockumentary Lint: The Movie (2011), which features reminisces by "[Alan] Moore, Stewart Lee, Robin Ince, Mikey Georgeson, Josie Long, D. Harlan Wilson, Bill [Ectric], and many others on Lint’s outrageous and irritating career."

=== Comic books ===
Aylett has also written for comics, most notably the Jeff Lint title The Caterer (2008). Other projects include #27 of Tom Strong (2004), The Promissory for Arthur magazine’s "mimeo" line (2007), Get That Thing Away From Me (2014), and Johnny Viable, which appeared in Alan Moore's print magazine Dodgem Logic and was collected and expanded as the standalone Johnny Viable & His Terse Friends (2014). In 2021-22 Aylett's 3-part comic Hyperthick was published by Floating World Comics; Alan Moore described it as "a new dimension of poetic genius" and Grant Morrison said, "It's astonishing - like being riot-hosed with language, ideas and imagery!" In late 2022 Aylett produced the Aylett Tarot, and in 2023 another card deck called The Trickster Brick, which featured creativity prompts. Both were available through Etsy.

== Awards ==
Slaughtermatic was shortlisted for the 1998 Philip K. Dick Award. Aylett was the recipient of the 2006 Jack Trevor Story Award.

== Personal life ==
Aylett left school at the age of seventeen and worked in a book warehouse, and later in law publishing. A synesthete, Aylett claims to have books appear in his brain in one visual "glob" that looks like a piece of gum. Aylett also has Asperger syndrome.

== Bibliography ==
=== Novels ===
- The Crime Studio. Serif. 1994. ISBN 1897959125.
- Bigot Hall. Serif. 1995. ISBN 1897959206.
- Slaughtermatic. Four Walls Eight Windows. 1997. ISBN 1568581033.
- The Inflateable Volunteer. Serif. 1999. ISBN 1861591233.
- Atom. Four Walls Eight Windows. 2000. ISBN 1568581750.
- Shamanspace. Codex. 2001. ISBN 1899598200.
- Only an Alligator. Gollancz. 2001. ISBN 0575069066.
- The Velocity Gospel. Gollancz. 2002. ISBN 0575070889.
- Dummyland. Gollancz. 2002. ISBN 0575070870.
- Karloff's Circus. Gollancz. 2004. ISBN 0575070897.
- The Complete Accomplice. Scar Garden. 2010. ISBN 978-0-9565677-0-3.
- Novahead. Serif. 2011. ISBN 978-0956567727.
- Rebel at the End of Time. PS Publishing. 2011. ISBN 978-0956567741.
- Fain the Sorcerer - 2012
- Tao Te Jinx - 2023
- The Book Lovers - 2024

=== Short fiction ===
- Toxicology. Four Walls Eight Windows. 1999. ISBN 1568581319.
- Toxicology (expanded ed.). Gollancz. 2001. ISBN 0575071095.
- Smithereens. Scar Garden. 2010. ISBN 978-0956567710.

=== Other works ===
- Lint. Thunder's Mouth Press. 2005. ISBN 1560256842.
- The Caterer. Spoof Pearl Comics reprint. 2008.
- And Your Point Is?. Raw Dog Screaming Press. 2014. ISBN 978-1933293-28-8.
- Johnny Viable and His Terse Friends. Floating World Comics. 2014.
- Heart of the Original. Unbound. 2015. ISBN 978-1783520916.
