= Miss Masque =

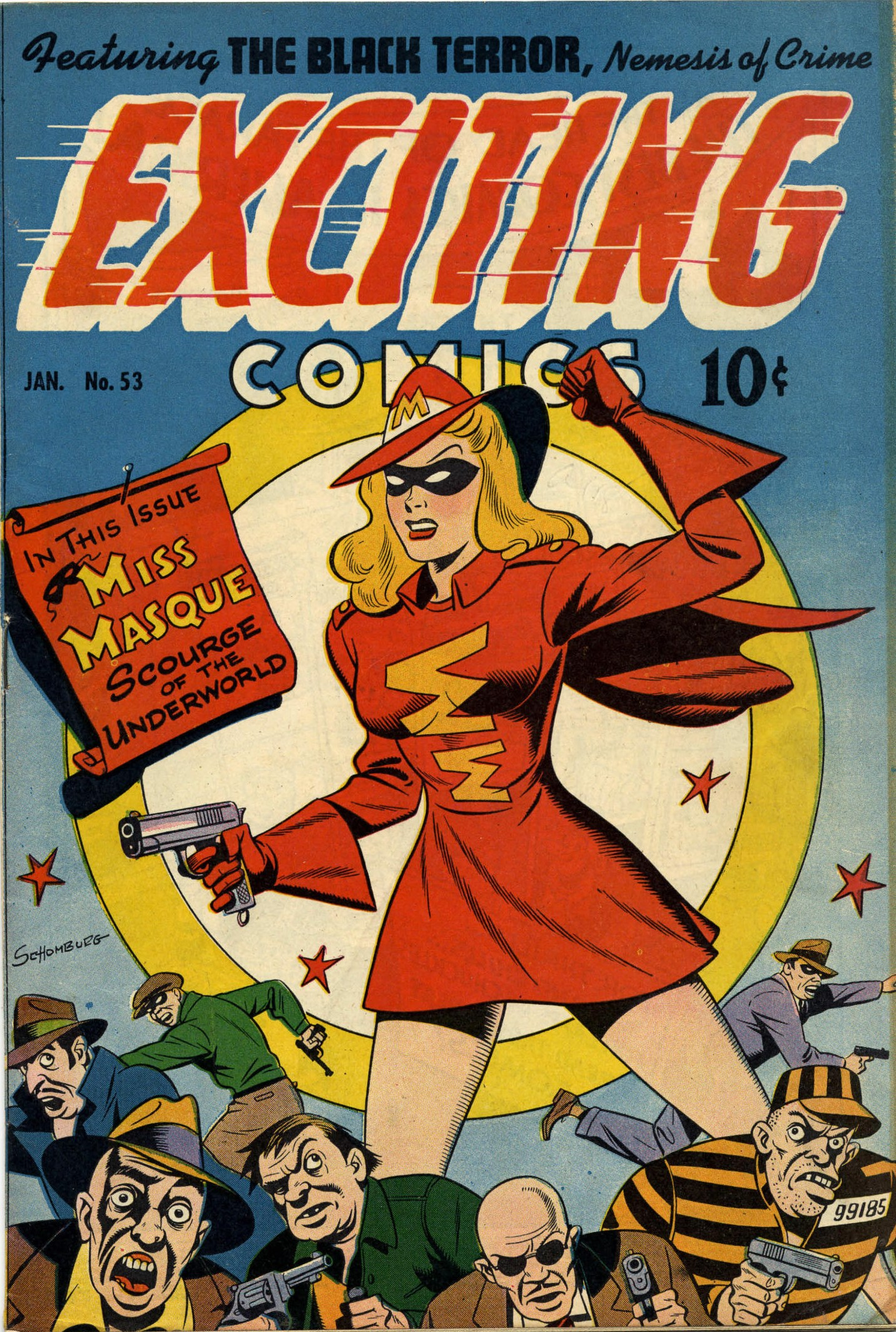
- Miss Masque, on the cover of Exciting Comics #53 (January 1947), art by Alex Schomburg.

Publication information
- Publisher: Nedor Comics; AC Comics; America's Best Comics
- First appearance: Exciting Comics #51 (September 1946)

In-story information
- Alter ego: Diana Adams
- Team affiliations: Sentinels of Justice (AC Comics); SMASH (America's Best Comics)
- Notable aliases: Ms. Masque; Masquerade

Miss Masque is a fictional masked crime-fighter. She originally appeared in comic books published by Nedor Comics, and was later revived by AC Comics, America's Best Comics, and Dynamite Entertainment.

== Nedor Comics ==
Miss Masque is the secret identity of Diana Adams, a young socialite who decides to fight crime and injustice in disguise. Miss Masque has no super powers, but relies on her wit and a pair of pistols. Her original costume was a mini-skirted red dress with red hat, gloves and cape, and a domino mask; yellow double "M" emblems on her chest and hat completed the ensemble. A later version of the costume had a bare midriff and shorter sleeves.

Miss Masque first appeared in Nedor Comics' Exciting Comics #51 (September 1946). She also appeared in America's Best Comics (not to be confused with the DC Comics imprint), Fighting Yank, and Black Terror; her final Golden Age appearance was America's Best Comics #31 (July 1949).

According to Jess Nevins' Encyclopedia of Golden Age Superheroes, "she takes on ordinary murderers, murderers who dress like the devil to do their dirty work, crooked fight promoters, the insane caretaker of an Egyptian museum, and so on".

There was no writer or artist credited for Miss Masque's first appearance. Alex Schomburg and Frank Frazetta provided art for later cover appearances, and Ralph Mayo penciled some splash pages.

The character's run in Exciting Comics ended with issue #54 (March 1947), and she then moved to America's Best Comics from issue #23 (Sept 1947) to #31 (July 1949).

== AC Comics ==
Miss Masque on the cover of AC Comics' Miss Masque #1 (2003).

Miss Masque is one of the many Golden Age characters revived by AC Comics in the early 1990s. The new version debuted in AC Annual #2 (1991). In AC continuity, Diana Adams is a Canadian socialite visiting New Orleans for Mardi Gras. Having forgotten to bring a costume for a party, she looks for one in a curio shop on Bourbon Street. The shop owner attempts to tell Adams that the costume is possessed by the "spirit of justice". As Adams is in a hurry, she ignores the warning, buys the outfit, and quickly leaves. When the party is interrupted by robbers, Adams stops the criminals and saves the life of a fellow partygoer. Finding herself strangely satisfied by the experience, she decides to make crime fighting her full-time occupation.

In her AC Comics debut story, Miss Masque is revealed to be one of a group of 1940s era crime fighters that agreed to enter the Vault of Heroes, a stasis chamber designed to keep the heroes in suspended animation until they are needed again. She is revived in the 1990s and joins the Femforce in their fight against the Shroud. She later becomes a member of the Sentinels of Justice.

Miss Masque has appeared in several AC Comics titles, including Femforce, Good Girl Art Quarterly, and her own self-titled comic book. AC Comics has also reprinted several Golden Age Miss Masque stories as part of their Golden Age Men of Mystery and Golden Age Greats titles.

== America's Best Comics/DC ==
The Golden Age version of Miss Masque was revived by Alan Moore for his Tom Strong comics, published by America's Best Comics (now an imprint of DC Comics). Moore used the Nedor Comics characters to populate Terra Obscura, the alternate universe version of Tom Strong's Earth. In Moore's story, the heroes had been placed in suspended animation in 1969 during an alien invasion, and are revived 30 years later by Tom Strong. Miss Masque made her first appearance in Tom Strong #12 (June 2001).

Miss Masque subsequently appeared in the Tom Strong spin-off Terra Obscura, written by Peter Hogan from plots developed by Hogan and Moore. Now calling herself Ms. Masque, she becomes a member of the reformed superhero team SMASH. Ms. Masque's costume has been modified, replacing the mini-skirt with a pair of skin-tight pants. She is in a romantic relationship with Carol Carter, also known as the Fighting Spirit (daughter of the deceased Fighting Yank).

== Dynamite Entertainment ==
Miss Masque has been revived once again as Masquerade in Alex Ross and Jim Krueger's new series from Dynamite Entertainment entitled Project Superpowers. This limited series features many Golden Age characters, revamped and updated for today in a story that shows Ross and Krueger's vision for the fate of these heroes.

Masquerade was one of the superheroes who had appeared after World War II, and was then trapped and imprisoned in the Urn of Pandora by the misguided Fighting Yank. When the Urn is broken decades later, she reappears (in Project Superpowers #3) in Japan. Her outfit has been drastically altered from when she first entered the Urn; she now wears a long red overcoat and wide-brimmed hat with a domino mask and two gun halters, and is suffering from amnesia. She finds another hero, V-Man, and the two of them are taken to New York — now New Shangri-La — along with other heroes who were freed from the Urn.

Her time in the Urn has given her literal masking powers — she can now replicate another person's appearance (although the seventh issue of the series shows her actually possessing the other person's body). In addition to a person's appearance, Masquerade also gains all their knowledge, including memories and skill sets. She also tends to briefly believe she is the person whose identity she is copying. It also caused her to fall in love with her teammate V-Man, having learned all about him.

In 2009, Dynamite Entertainment gave Masquerade her own mini-series, starting in February and tied in with the Project Superpowers storyline. In 2020, she appeared in the mini-series Die!namite fighting against a zombie plague.

She, Lady Satan and The Woman in Red will be getting their own comic called Scarlett Sisters.
