= Standard Comics =

Former comic book publisher

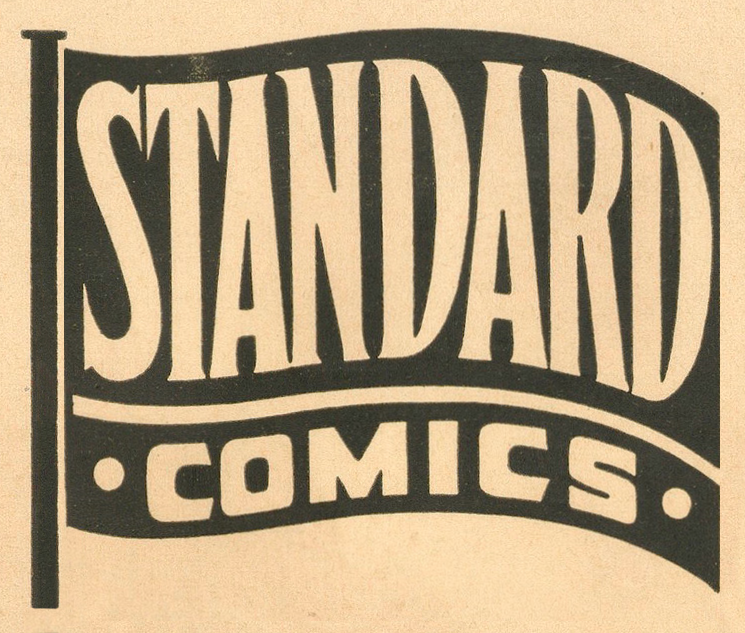
- Parent company: Pines Publications
- Founded: 1939; 87 years ago
- Founder: Ned Pines
- Defunct: 1959; 67 years ago
- Country of origin: United States
- Headquarters location: New York City
- Publication types: Comic books
- Fiction genres: Superhero
- Imprints: Better Publications; Nedor Publishing; Pines Comics

Standard Comics was a comic book imprint of American publisher Ned Pines, who also published pulp magazines (under a variety of company names that he also used for the comics) and paperback books (under the Popular Library name). Standard in turn was the parent company of two comic-book lines: Better Publications and Nedor Publishing (/ˈniːdɔːr/). Collectors and historians sometimes refer to them collectively as "Better/Nedor/Standard/Pines".

== History ==
In business from 1939 to 1959, Standard was a prolific publisher during the Golden Age of comic books. Its best-known character, initially published under the Better imprint, is the Black Terror. In June 1949, the Better and Nedor imprints were consolidated as the Standard Comics line, with a "Standard Comics" flag-like cover logo. The titles previously had no publisher logo. In 1956, Standard ended, and only three titles continued, published by Pines Comics. This last venture also incorporated several titles from the defunct St. John Publications. Most titles went to other publishers after the company folded in 1959.

Beginning in the 1980s, Standard/Better/Nedor characters have been revived by other publishers. Publisher Bill Black used many of them in his 1980s imprint Americomics (later shortened to AC Comics). Many of the female heroes are members of the AC Comics superhero team Femforce. In the 2000s, Standard/Better/Nedor characters have appeared in writer Alan Moore's comic book series Tom Strong and its spin-off Terra Obscura. Marvel Comics used the names American Eagle, Grim Reaper, and Wonder Man for its own, different characters.

The eight-issue comic book miniseries Project Superpowers #0–7 (Jan.–Oct. 2008), published by Dynamite Entertainment, resurrected a number of Golden Age superheroes, including those originally published by Fox Feature Syndicate, Crestwood Publications, and Standard/Better/Nedor, many of which are assumed to be in the public domain but may not be.

== Titles ==
=== Superheroes ===
- American Crusader
- American Eagle
- Black Terror
- Captain Future (not to be confused with the pulp hero)
- Cavalier
- Doc Strange (Tom Strange)
- Fighting Yank
- Four Comrades
- Ghost (also known as Green Ghost)
- Grim Reaper
- Judy of the Jungle
- Kara the Jungle Princess
- Lance Lewis, Space Detective
- Liberator
- Lone Eagle
- Magnet
- Major Mars
- Mask (based on the Black Bat)
- Masked Rider
- Mechano
- Miss Masque
- Mystico
- The Oracle
- The Phantom Detective (based on the pulp hero)
- Phantom Soldier
- Princess Pantha
- Pyroman
- Red Mask
- Rick Howard, Mystery Rider
- Scarab
- Silver Knight
- Spectro
- Supermouse
- Thesson (Nedor)
- The Woman in Red
- Wonder Man
