= SMASH (comics) =

Society of Modern American Science Heroes
- Splash page from Tom Strong #12 (June 2001). Script by Alan Moore, pencils by Chris Sprouse.

Publication information
- Publisher: America's Best Comics
- First appearance: Tom Strong #11 (January 2001)
- Created by: Alan Moore; Chris Sprouse

In-story information
- Base(s): Antarctica
- Member(s): American Crusader; Black Terror; Cavalier; Fighting Yank I (deceased); Fighting Yank II; Green Ghost; Liberator; Ms. Masque; Pyroman; The Scarab; Tom Strange; Tim Roland; The Woman in Red

The Society of Modern American Science Heroes, or SMASH, is a team of superheroes whose adventures are published by America's Best Comics and take place on the parallel world of Terra Obscura.

== History ==
SMASH first appeared in Tom Strong #11 (January 2001). In 1968, Tom discovers an alternate version of his Earth located on the far side of the galaxy, which he dubs "Terra Obscura", which has the same cities as Earth, but different names for them. Most notably, the big East Coast city is New Lancaster. It also shares a similar history as Earth.

On his visit to Terra Obscura, Tom meets his counterpart Tom "Doc" Strange, and the team of science-heroes known as the Society of Major American Science Heroes (SMASH). All the members of SMASH are based on characters previously published by Nedor Comics in the 1940s. With the original publisher's collapse, copyrights on the characters were not renewed upon 28 years of creation and so lapsed into the public domain. One of the Nedor's many titles was America's Best Comics, and when the coincidence of this was pointed out to Alan Moore, he decided to incorporate these characters into his Tom Strong series.

For their 2000 debut, Moore created a backstory for them, covering the time periods during which they were not actually being published. The history of the characters (both from Nedor and ABC) follow the conventions established by DC Comics and Marvel Comics: the Golden, Silver, and Modern Age of Comic Books.

=== Golden Age (Nedor Comics era) ===
The Golden Age heroes were published in various Nedor Comics titles, including America's Best Comics, the inspiration for reviving the characters. In the updated chronology, Tom Strong reveals that the Golden Age adventures of the Terra Obscura characters are portrayed in comic books on his world, in an echo of the old DC Multiverse Earth-1/Earth-2 relationship.

=== Silver Age (Moore's backstory) ===
In reality, the Nedor characters were not in print during the Silver Age, but flashback sequences in Terra Obscura reference the era. This includes sequences establishing Tom Strange and the Black Terror as the parallel of the Superman-Batman World's Finest team. This is the time period when Tom Strong made his first journey to Terra Obscura. After Tom returned to his own solar system, Terra Obscura came under attack when the Moon landings of 1969 awakened a deadly alien. The lunar invader's power was so great that several members of SMASH were killed (the first time Terra Obscura science-heroes had ever died in battle): The Black Terror, Tom Strange's side-kick Mike Ellis and The Ghost. The rest of SMASH were encased in stasis fields orbiting the Moon. Tom Strange was able to escape and ran through space for 30 years in order to reach his recent acquaintance and get help.

=== Modern Age (Terra Obscura) ===
The "Modern Age" stories begin when the two Toms return and free the remaining members of SMASH. After they had been freed, the remaining members of SMASH pooled their efforts for a final attack on the lunar alien, which had been building a giant construct in the Antarctic over the previous 30 years. Meanwhile, Tim Roland, the Black Terror's side-kick, initialized a system which Benton had been working on prior to his death: "Terror 2000", a computer generated version of Benton, able to combat crime using his complete integration into the world's computer networks.

Also making a return from the grave was the Ghost. Using his supreme yogic powers he was able to stay in a state of limbo, between this world and the next, and appears when he can as "The Green Ghost".

Together they fought and defeated the alien menace, which had been trying to turn the entire planet into a spaceship, with Terror 2000 delivering the final blow, but this final fight was not without its losses; Bruce Carter, the Fighting Yank, was killed in the melee.

With the alien menace destroyed, the members of SMASH find it difficult adjusting to life in the 21st century, and decide to disband. Three years later, a new menace arises that draws the former teammates together. A mysterious "technology plague" sweeps through the nation, rendering technology useless and threatens to return Terra Incognita to the Stone Age.

The source is traced to the Grand Canyon, where former SMASH member Mystico is using his mystical powers to fight the megalomaniacal Terror 2003, the computer intelligence based on the mind of the dead Black Terror. Mystico's plague also nullifies the science-based powers of the superheroes; only the Liberator and the Scarab, with their magic-based powers, are unaffected.

Mystico is at first able to overpower the Liberator and Tom Strange, and reveals that he is possessed by the spirit of the Egyptian god Set. Meanwhile, Fighting Yank II (who has regained her mystical powers) and Ms. Masque are able to find the source of Mystico's powers and de-activate it. The Scarab asks the goddess Maat for help, and is bonded to the god Thoth in order to act as a guardian over Mystico/Set. The Grand Canyon is given over to Mystico/Set as the domain of "New Egypt", while the Terror 2003 program is confined to Invertica City. Tom Strange convinces his friends to join him in reforming SMASH.

Several years later, SMASH is faced with a new challenge when former SMASH member Captain Future returns. His ship, the Thunderbolt, had been thrown through time after a battle with Dr. X in 1959, and is now causing the timelines to overlap. The Terror 2003, now upgraded to the Terror 2004, tries to use these timeslips as a way of taking over Terra Incognita. In the end, a time-traveling Black Terror from the past arrives and destroys the Terror 2004.

== Publishing history ==
After the Nedor Comics characters appeared in Tom Strong, Moore and Peter Hogan co-plotted a spin-off series that Hogan penned himself. As of 2007 two 6-issue series entitled Terra Obscura have been published by ABC, with a third possibly in the works. They take place five years after the end of Tom Strong #12.

Collections:

- Tom Strong (Book Two) (ISBN 1-56389-880-2): Contains Tom Strong issues #11 and 12, introducing SMASH.
- Terra Obscura v1 (ISBN 1-4012-0286-1): Collection of issues #1-6. Takes place five years after end of Tom Strong #12. Battle with Mystico and Terror 2003, reformation of SMASH.
- Terra Obscura v2 (ISBN 1-4012-0622-0): Collection of issues #7-12. Return of Captain Future.

Special issues:

- ABC A-Z: Terra Obscura and Splash Brannigan (published in January 2006): Background on SMASH and the superheroes of Terra Obscura.

== See also ==
- Terra Obscura
- Nedor Comics
