= America's Best Comics =

American comic book imprint

- Industry: Comics
- Founded: 1999; 27 years ago
- Founder: Alan Moore
- Defunct: 2010
- Headquarters: United States
- Key people: Alan Moore
- Parent: WildStorm (DC Comics)

America's Best Comics (ABC) was a comic book publishing brand. It was set up by Alan Moore in 1999 as an imprint of WildStorm, an idea proposed to Moore by WildStorm founder Jim Lee when it was still one of the studios whose books were published by Image Comics, of which Lee had been a founding member.

== History ==
Alex Ross' cover to America's Best Comics 64 Page Giant, featuring many of the characters created by Alan Moore for the imprint.

America's Best Comics was a prominent Standard/Better/Nedor title during the 1940s Golden Age of Comic Books, starring such heroes as the Black Terror and the Fighting Yank. Those characters were integrated into the Moore version under the ABC imprint, where Moore wrote series including The League of Extraordinary Gentlemen, a strip which merged several famous Victorian era fiction characters into one world; Tom Strong, an homage to pulp fiction heroes such as Tarzan and Doc Savage; Top 10, a police procedural set in a police precinct in a city where everyone has superpowers or is a costumed adventurer; and Promethea, one of Moore's most personal pieces which detailed his view on magic.

Peter Hogan and Rick Veitch had their own spin-off series, Terra Obscura and Greyshirt: Indigo Sunset respectively, and Steve Moore (no relation) co-wrote Tom Strong's Terrific Tales with Moore.

Regular contributing artists include Kevin O'Neill, Chris Sprouse, Rick Veitch, J. H. Williams III, Gene Ha, Zander Cannon, Kevin Nowlan, Hilary Barta, Melinda Gebbie, Jim Baikie, Yanick Paquette, and Arthur Adams.

All the lettering for the ABC line was done by Todd Klein, with the exception of The League of Extraordinary Gentlemen which was handled by Bill Oakley. The logo of ABC is mainly based on an idea from Alex Ross and was also done by Todd Klein.

In August 1998, Jim Lee sold WildStorm to DC Comics, unaware that due to past conflicts over the Watchmen copyright in the 1980s, Moore had vowed never to work for the publisher again.

According to the interview Moore gave George Khoury in the book The Extraordinary Works of Alan Moore, when Lee first saw Alan Moore after the takeover, the tall figure of Moore holding his snake-headed walking stick impressed Lee so, he was sure Moore – who was then still ignorant of the sale – was going to beat him senseless. Moore was reluctant at first, but ultimately decided to accept his new situation as he had promised work to a number of his artist friends from Rob Liefeld's defunct Awesome Comics line. In the same interview, he said that it was better to go back against a principle for the greater good, than to have no principles in life at all. He also expressed interest in eventually ending the line with a little apocalypse. Deliberately and permanently ending an entire comic line was something he felt had never been done before in comics.

Moore brought an end to the ABC Universe towards the conclusion of Promethea when she ushers in the apocalypse. Moore wrote the last issue of Tom Strong and two 64-page Tomorrow Stories specials offering a final farewell to most of ABC's characters.

Before those final stories, the ABC line continued a little while longer under other writers. Tom Strong, for example, had been written entirely by guest authors since November 2003. These authors have included Peter Hogan, Geoff Johns, Mark Schultz, Steve Aylett, Brian K. Vaughan, Ed Brubaker and Michael Moorcock. A sequel to Top 10 called Beyond The Farthest Precinct has been penned by novelist Paul Di Filippo and artist Jerry Ordway and another title, written by Peter Hogan and Steve Moore, was going to explore the remaining secrets of all of the major ABC characters. This mini-series America's Best Comics: A to Z, started in September 2005 but was canceled after four issues in July 2006.

Moore announced his semiretirement in 2003, after which ABC's output decreased considerably. An exception was The League of Extraordinary Gentlemen, which was owned by Moore and O'Neill, whose subsequent original installments were published by Top Shelf Comics.

WildStorm was shut down in 2010. Its disestablishment spelled the end of ABC; subsequently, reprints of ABC titles were published under DC's Vertigo imprint.

== Titles ==
- America's Best Comics: A to Z
- The League of Extraordinary Gentlemen
- Promethea
- Tomorrow Stories
  - Greyshirt: Indigo Sunset (a Tomorrow Stories mini-series spin-off, written and drawn by Rick Veitch)
- Tom Strong
  - Tom Strong's Terrific Tales (a twelve-issue anthology spin-off)
  - Tom Strong and the Robots of Doom (mini-series spin-off)
  - Terra Obscura (a Tom Strong spin-off based on old Nedor Comics characters, written by Peter Hogan)
- Top 10
  - Smax (a Top 10 mini-series spin-off)
  - Top 10: The Forty-Niners (a Top 10 graphic novel spin-off)
  - Top 10: Beyond the Farthest Precinct (a Top 10 mini-series)

=== America's Best Comics: A to Z ===
America's Best Comics: A to Z was to be a six-part miniseries written by Peter Hogan and Steve Moore. It planned to reveal secrets and unknown facts about the characters that have appeared thus far in the ABC line. The miniseries was canceled after issue #4. Work had begun on issue #5, but its unclear how complete it was before the plug was pulled. There are no plans at present to publish a collection of the issues.

Each issue features artwork from character's original designer/co-creator and a cover by Terry Dodson. It was expected to signal the end of the ABC line, and was planned as a farewell to the characters.

1. Featured Tom Strong and Jack B. Quick, with art by Chris Sprouse and Kevin Nowlan.
2. Featured Greyshirt and Cobweb, with art by Rick Veitch and Melinda Gebbie.
3. Featured Terra Obscura and Splash Brannigan.
4. Featured Top 10 and Teams (America's Best and America's Worst).
5. Would have focused on Smax (in the style of a holiday program) and First American.
6. Was never solicited, but the remaining topics that had not been covered include Promethea and Jonni Future.

=== Other one-off titles ===
- America's Best Comics Preview (Mar 1999) (a mini-comic preview, free with Wizard magazine #91)
- America's Best Comics 64 Page Giant (Dec 2000) (a collection of short stories involving all of the ABC characters)
- America's Best Comic's Sketchbook (Dec 2001) (a collection of sketches of main characters by ABC artists)
- The Many Worlds of Tesla Strong (May 2003) (a 64-page, single issue, Tom Strong spin-off, released with two covers, by Arthur Adams and Bruce Timm)

==== Other collected editions ====
- America's Best Comics (graphic novel collection of the 64 Page Giant, Sketchbook, and Many Worlds, paperback: ISBN 1-4012-0147-4)
- Promethea Covers Collection (a collection of all 32 Promethea covers)
