= Tom Strong =

American comic book series

Publication information
- Publisher: America's Best Comics (DC Comics)
- First appearance: America's Best Comics Preview (March 1999)
- Created by: Alan Moore; Chris Sprouse

In-story information
- Team affiliations: The Strongmen of America; America's Best
- Partnerships: Dhalua; Tesla; Pneuman; King Solomon; Val Var Garm
- Abilities: Super-strength; Inventive genius Virtually immortal

Tom Strong is an American comic book series created by writer Alan Moore and artist Chris Sprouse, initially published bi-monthly by America's Best Comics, an imprint of DC Comics' WildStorm division. Tom Strong, the title character, is a "science hero", with a wife, Dhalua, and a daughter, Tesla, both with enhanced physical and mental abilities and longevity. He lives in a building called The Stronghold in Millennium City. He is also helped by Pneuman, a steam-powered robot, and King Solomon, a gorilla with human characteristics. His greatest foe is tuxedo-clad "science villain" Paul Saveen. The series explores many different timelines and universes, which are a nod to different comic genres. The primary characters are tributes to and spoofs of early pulp heroes.

Spin-offs include Tom Strong's Terrific Tales, Terra Obscura, and the one-shot The Many Worlds of Tesla Strong. A limited series titled Tom Strong and the Planet of Peril was published in 2013 by Vertigo.

Tom Strong appears in The Terrifics, a DC Comics series about a group of the same name formed by Mr. Terrific, Metamorpho, Plastic Man and Phantom Girl.

== Fictional character biography ==
Tom is reared in a high-gravity chamber and given an intensive education by his eccentric scientist parents on the fictional West Indian island of Attabar Teru. His upbringing, plus ingesting a root used by the natives of the island for health and long life, makes him nearly physically and mentally perfect. Though born at the dawn of the 20th century, by the year 2000 he looks as if he is only in his 40s.

Tom Strong frequently has adventures alongside his younger self. There is also a parallel cartoon universe where a talking bunny is a version of Tom Strong, as well as a Western universe, and even "Tom Teen", where characters are similar to those from Archie Comics.

== Powers and abilities ==
Tom Strong has super-strength and is an inventive genius. Strong maintains his physical health and longevity through the regular consumption of a mysterious herb called Goloka Root. He is an explorer with vast personal wealth and has contributed greatly to the technology available in Millennium City.

== Publication history ==
=== Issues #1–7 ===
The following issues are collected in Tom Strong Book One:

| No | Title | Publication date | Creators |
|---|---|---|---|
| 1 | How Tom Strong Got Started | 7 April 1999 | w: Alan Moore p: Chris Sprouse i: Alan Gordon c: Tad Ehrlich |
Timmy Turbo receives his Strongmen of America membership, which also includes the story of How Tom Strong Got Started. As he reads of Tom Strong's origins and upbringing on Attabar Teru, Tom Strong defeats Blimp Bandit in the very cable car in which Timmy is riding, but Timmy is too engrossed in his reading to notice.
| 2 | Return of the Modular Man | 12 May 1999 | w: Alan Moore p: Chris Sprouse i: Alan Gordon c: Tad Ehrlich |
The Modular Man, the unique mechanical-molecular megalomaniac Tom first destroyed in 1987, returns to Millennium City after two nerds download Modular Man's plans from the internet and accidentally reactivate him. Tom must find a way to stop the Modular Man before he envelops the whole city.
| 3 | Aztech Nights | 8 July 1999 | w: Alan Moore p: Chris Sprouse i: Alan Gordon c: Tad Ehrlich |
When a mysterious Aztec building materialises in Millennium Park, Tom discovers that it belongs to a brutal futuristic race from an alternate Earth. These Aztecs worship a sentient computer program that models itself after Quetzalcoatl.
| 4 | Swastika Girls! | 1 September 1999 | w: Alan Moore p: Chris Sprouse, Arthur Adams (untold tale) i: Alan Gordon c: Tad Ehrlich |
Ingrid Weiss and her Nazi cohorts attack Tom Strong's home, The Stronghold, in Millennium City. When Tom attempts to defend his home and family, he finds himself drawn into a sinister plot. Untold Tale of Tom Strong shows Weiss and Strong first meeting in Berlin in 1945. This is the first sequence of a four-part arc.
| 5 | Memories of Pangaea, Escape from Eden! | 13 October 1999 | w: Alan Moore p: Chris Sprouse, Jerry Ordway (untold tale) i: Alan Gordon c: Tad Ehrlich |
Having been sent backwards through time to a primordial Earth, Tom Strong must defend himself from its single inhabitant, which spans the Earth's entire solitary continent: The Pangean. Tom's first expedition to ancient Earth, with his wife, Dhalua, in the 1950s, appears in the flashback, drawn to resemble an EC Comics story.
| 6 | Dead Man's Hand, The Big Heat? | 29 December 1999 | w: Alan Moore p: Chris Sprouse, Dave Gibbons (untold tale) i: Alan Gordon, Dave Gibbons c: Mike Garcia |
Trapped by villainous Paul Saveen, Tom must fight his way out of his captor's grasp; even if he succeeds, Ingrid Weiss has one last trump card to play: their son, Albrecht, who was conceived after she stole Tom's sperm while he was unconscious. Along the way the story shows first encounter between Tom and his arch-nemesis Saveen in the 1920s.
| 7 | Sons and Heirs, Showdown in the Shimmering City | 1 March 2000 | w: Alan Moore p: Chris Sprouse, Gary Frank (untold tale) i: Alan Gordon, Cam Smith c: Mike Garcia |
Held emotionally to ransom by Paul Saveen and Ingrid Weiss, Tom Strong must come to terms with his shocking piece of news. The story also shows futuristic Tom Strong in 2050 and is the conclusion of the four-part arc.

=== Issues #8–14 ===
The following issues are collected in Tom Strong Book Two:

| No | Title | Publication date | Creators |
|---|---|---|---|
| 8 | Riders of the Lost Mesa; The Old Skool!; Sparks | 17 May 2000 | w: Alan Moore p: Chris Sprouse, Alan Weiss i: Alan Gordon, Alan Weiss c: Wildstorm FX, Mike Garcia |
Riders of the Lost Mesa – A prospecting town in Arizona that disappeared on New Year's Eve of 1849 suddenly reappears again 150 years later. Tom Strong and King Solomon investigate. The Old Skool! – During a school trip, Timmy Turbo and other members of the Strongmen of America find themselves sucked into a warp dimension where harsh teaching methods are enforced by massive robots. Sparks – Tesla Strong investigates sudden unexpected volcano activity in San Mageo amid native talk of "fire-devils" and "salamanders", and finds a little more than she bargained for. First appearance of Val Var Garm.
| 9 | Terror Temple of Tayasal; Volcano Dreams; Flip Attitude! | 19 July 2000 | w: Alan Moore p: Chris Sprouse, Paul Chadwick i: Alan Gordon, Paul Chadwick c: Matt Hollingsworth |
Terror Temple of Tayasal – En route to meeting with his wife and his father-in-law on Attabar Teru, Tom Strong stops off to investigate an intriguing archaeological find amongst the ruins of the Mayan city of Tayasal. Volcano Dreams – Tom Strong arrives late on Attabar Teru to meet his wife, Dhalua, and father-in-law. Dhalua recounts the story of her "Vision Ordeal" (a rite of passage for Omotu women) on Attabar Teru. Flip Attitude! – Tesla Strong meets Kid Tilt, daughter of science-villain King Tilt who Tom Strong captured and placed in jail, while Tom and Dhalua are away.
| 10 | Tom Strong and his Phantom Autogyro; Funnyland!; Too Many Teslas? | 20 September 2000 | w: Alan Moore p: Chris Sprouse, Gary Gianni i: Alan Gordon, Gary Gianni c: Matt Hollingsworth |
Tom Strong and his Phantom Autogyro – In 1925 Tom makes a journey into the land of the dead using the late Foster Parallax's final invention and learns a little about his parentage. Funnyland! – Inspired by his visit to a parallel dimension in Aztech Nights, Tom builds and uses a "searchboard" capable of pan-dimension travel. His first stop takes him to the anthropomorphic animal world of Warren Strong. Too Many Teslas? – Eager to try out her father's new invention, Tesla sneaks into her father's laboratory and activates the "searchboard", but it seems like all the Teslas in the different dimension have the same idea at once. This issue marks the first appearance of several alternate Earths later featured in The Many Worlds of Tesla Strong.
| 11 | Strange Reunion | 20 December 2000 | w: Alan Moore p: Chris Sprouse i: Alan Gordon c: Matt Hollingsworth, David Baron |
Tom gets a surprising visit from old acquaintance Tom "Doc" Strange, who arrives all the way from Terra Obscura, an alternate version of Earth on the other side of the Milky Way galaxy which Strong visited in 1969. This is the first appearance of Terra Obscura, which would later have its own spin-off series.
| 12 | Terror on Terra Obscura! | 18 April 2001 | w: Alan Moore p: Chris Sprouse i: Alan Gordon c: Matt Hollingsworth |
Part two: Tom Strong and Doc Strange return to Terra Obscura together to battle the evil that threatens the planet, freeing many of the science-heroes that have been trapped for the past 30 years in the process.
| 13 | The Tower at Time's End! | 16 May 2001 | w: Alan Moore p: Chris Sprouse, Kyle Baker, Russ Heath, Pete Poplaski i: Alan Gordon c: Matt Hollingsworth |
The mysterious Time-Keeper at the End of Time itself is forced to split the ruby capstone of Eternity into three, and send it back through time to into the care of three different versions of Tom Strong, in the hope of saving it from the evil clutches of Paul Saveen and thus foiling his plans to dominate history.
| 14 | Space Family Strong; The Land of Heart's Desire!; Baubles of the Brain Bazaar! | 8 August 2001 | w: Alan Moore p: Chris Sprouse, Hilary Barta i: Alan Gordon, Hilary Barta c: Matt Hollingsworth |
Space Family Strong – Tom Strong's family go into space for their vacation of 1954, and everything goes wrong. This is a comedy episode, featuring a caricature of Tom Strong. The Land of Heart's Desire – During the Strong family vacation of 1955, Tom and Dhalua are drawn to a mysterious and dangerous planet. Baubles of the Brain Bazaar! – When the Strong family attempt to return home from their vacation they find themselves 40,000,000 years in the future alongside Johnny Future battling a heartless slaver of souls. This is the first appearance of Johnny Future, the predecessor of Jonni Future. This issue was most likely an inspiration for the spin-off series Tom Strong's Terrific Tales, featuring a comedic "untold tale", a story featuring Young Tom Strong and an adventure set in Jonni Future's universe.

=== Issues #15–19 ===
The following issues are collected in Tom Strong Book Three:

| No | Title | Publication date | Creators |
|---|---|---|---|
| 15 | Ring Of Fire! | 4 January 2002 | w: Alan Moore p: Chris Sprouse i: Karl Story c: Matt Hollingsworth |
Tesla Strong is kidnapped by the mysterious "fire devil" from Tom Strong #8 (story "Sparks") and it is up to her parents to rescue her.
| 16 | Some Call Him The Space Cowboy | 27 February 2002 | w: Alan Moore p: Chris Sprouse i: Karl Story c: Alex Sinclair |
Part One: While Tom Strong is struggling to come to terms with his daughter's new boyfriend, a mysterious three-eyed stranger arrives in Millennium City with a warning for Tom Strong
| 17 | Ant Fugue! | 3 July 2002 | w: Alan Moore p: Chris Sprouse i: Karl Story c: Alex Sinclair |
Part Two: Tom Strong and the Weird Rider attempt to prepare a force to tackle the impending invasion of Earth.
| 18 | The Last Roundup | 30 October 2002 | w: Alan Moore p: Chris Sprouse i: Karl Story c: Dave Stewart |
Part Three: Tom Strong and company defend Earth against the alien menace.
| 19 | Electric Ladyland!; Bad To The Bone; The Hero-Hoard Of Horatio Hogg! | 19 February 2003 | w: Alan Moore, Leah Moore p: Chris Sprouse, Howard Chaykin, Shawn McManus i: Karl Story, Howard Chaykin, Steve Mitchell c: Dave Stewart |
Electric Ladyland! – Dhalua is kidnapped by a secret society of women. Bad to the Bone – The details of Paul Saveen's death are revealed as he searches for the Temple of Everlasting Life. The Hero-Hoard of Horatio Hogg! – Tom and Tesla are trapped inside a booby-trapped comic-book by crazed collector Horatio Hogg.

=== Issues #20–25 ===
The following issues are collected in Tom Strong Book Four:

| No | Title | Publication date | Creators |
|---|---|---|---|
| 20 | How Tom Stone Got Started: Chapter One | 23 April 2003 | w: Alan Moore p: Jerry Ordway i: Karl Story c: Dave Stewart |
The Stronghold is invaded by a mysterious woman who claims to be an alternate-timeline version of Susan Strong, Tom's mother. She tells him of an alternate history in which Sinclair Strong, rather than the sailor Tomas, was killed in the landing on Attabar Teru.
| 21 | How Tom Stone Got Started: Chapter Two – Strongmen In Silvertime | 20 August 2003 | w: Alan Moore p: Jerry Ordway i: Trevor Scott, Karl Story, Richard Friend c: Wildstorm FX |
The greater emotional warmth and social skill of the mixed-race science-hero Tom Stone enable him to reform many of the villains who Tom Strong merely fought.
| 22 | How Tom Stone Got Started: Chapter Three – Crisis In Infinite Hearts | 8 October 2003 | w: Alan Moore p: Jerry Ordway i: Jerry Ordway, Sandra Hope, Richard Friend c: Dave Stewart |
The tragic collapse of Tom Stone's life is revealed, and Tom Strong helps Susan Stone to make a terrible decision.
| 23 | Moonday | 12 November 2003 | w: Peter Hogan p: Chris Sprouse i: Karl Story, John Dell c: Dave Stewart |
Svetlana X and Tom Strong travel to the Moon to rescue Svetlana's missing partner Dimi.
| 24 | Snow Queen | 2 January 2004 | w: Peter Hogan p: Chris Sprouse i: Karl Story, John Dell c: Dave Stewart |
Tom discovers that his first love Greta Gabriel, believed murdered by the villain Dr. Permafrost, is still alive in a mutated form.
| 25 | Tom Strong's Pal, Wally Willoughby | 25 February 2004 | w: Geoff Johns p: John Paul Leon i: John Paul Leon c: Dave Stewart |
Tom has to deal with Wally Willoughby, a socially crippled obsessive fan whose pain manifests itself through uncontrollable and destructive reality-warping powers.

=== Issues #26–30 ===
The following issues are collected in Tom Strong Book Five:

| No | Title | Publication date | Creators |
|---|---|---|---|
| 26 | The Day Tom Strong Renegotiated the Friendly Skies | 5 May 2004 | w: Mark Schultz p: Pasqual Ferry i: Pascual Ferry c: Wendy Fouts, Carrie Strachan |
When all Earth's heavier-than-air flying machines mysteriously stop working, Tom must follow in his father's footsteps to renew an old compact.
| 27 | Jenny Panic and the Bible of Dreams | 8 July 2004 | w: Steve Aylett p: Shawn McManus i: Shawn McManus c: Wildstorm FX |
Tom tries to put a non-violent end to the trail of deaths unknowingly caused by a young woman whose vengeful dreams assault their real-world targets.
| 28 | A Fire in His Belly | 22 September 2004 | w: Brian K. Vaughan p: Peter Snejbjerg c: Wildstorm FX |
Sad events cause Pneuman to make a shocking decision.
| 29 | The Terrible True Life of Tom Strong, Part 1 | 13 October 2004 | w: Ed Brubaker p: Duncan Fegredo i: Duncan Fegredo c: Carrie Strachan |
Tom Strong battles mad scientist Eldon Moravia for an ancient magical artefact.
| 30 | The Terrible True Life of Tom Strong, Part 2 | 29 December 2004 | w: Ed Brubaker p: Duncan Fegredo i: Duncan Fegredo c: Michelle Madsen |
Trapped in a hideously grim and gritty universe, Tom finds himself making increasingly horrific discoveries about his own past. This issue can be seen as a parody of elements of Moore's famous metafictional superhero comic Miracleman.

=== Issues #31–36 ===
The following issues are collected in the final volume Tom Strong Book Six:

| No | Title | Publication date | Creators |
|---|---|---|---|
| 31 | The Black Blade of the Barbary Coast, Part 1 | 16 February 2005 | w: Michael Moorcock p: Jerry Ordway i: Jerry Ordway c: Michelle Madsen |
Metatemporal investigator Sir Seaton Begg persuades Tom to travel to an alternate Earth's Golden Age of Piracy, to stop the albino Captain Zodiac unleashing Chaos on the Multiverse.
| 32 | The Black Blade of the Barbary Coast, Part 2 | 13 April 2005 | w: Michael Moorcock p: Jerry Ordway i: Jerry Ordway c: Michelle Madsen |
Tom and Zodiac fight over the mysterious Black Blade, while Solomon meets some distant relatives.
| 33 | The Journey Within | 8 June 2005 | w: Joe Casey p: Ben Oliver i: Ben Oliver c: Joe Mettler |
Pneuman's increasingly bizarre behaviour forces Tom and Solomon to engage in some very hands-on debugging.
| 34 | The Spires of Samakhara | 31 August 2005 | w: Steve Moore p: Paul Gulacy i: Jimmy Palmiotti c: Michelle Madsen |
Tom investigates an anomaly in China and encounters places and characters from a boyhood favourite pulp fantasy story.
| 35 | Cold Calling | 2 November 2005 | w: Peter Hogan p: Chris Sprouse i: Karl Story |
The second part to Hogan's "Snow Queen". Tom is shocked to discover that Greta is apparently the partner-in-crime of a new Dr. Permafrost.
| 36 | Tom Strong at the End of the World | 8 March 2006 | w: Alan Moore p: Chris Sprouse i: Karl Story c: José Villarrubia |
The final issue features a crossover with the final issues of Promethea – and the apocalypse depicted therein – from Tom's perspective. Guest appearances by characters from all the ABC series, including Top 10, Tomorrow Stories, Terra Obscura and Tom Strong's Terrific Tales.

=== Additional appearances ===
- America's Best Comics: 64 Page Giant features a Tom Strong story written by Steve Moore with pencils by Humberto Ramos and inks by John Totleben.
- The ABC Preview was polybagged with Wizard magazine and this story (with art by Chris Sprouse) is the actual first appearance of Tom Strong and King Solomon, albeit in a one-page cameo.
- Tom Strong also makes an appearance in The Many Worlds of Tesla Strong, a 64-page story written by Peter Hogan with various artists (the above stories are collected in the America's Best Comics trade-paperback).
- Promethea also has an appearance from Tom Strong, which is recounted from Strong's perspective in issue #36.
- Tomorrow Stories Special #2 includes an "America's Best" story, "The Lethal Luck of the Magister Ludi". This is set in the Silver Age of the ABC universe and features Tom Strong, the Cobweb, the William Woolcott version of Promethea, Splash Brannigan, Johnny Future (the uncle and predecessor of Jonni Future), and air-ace heroine Fancy O'Keefe (who previously appeared in the Young Tom Strong story in Tom Strong's Terrific Tales #11). The story is a pastiche, printed on deliberately aged-looking paper and with mock-1960s art, of Silver Age Justice League comics.
- Tom Strong's name is mentioned in Top 10: The Forty-Niners during an old World War II video as one of 'America's Science Heroes' who joined in the war effort to fight the Nazis.
- Tom Strong is featured as a recurring guest-star in the DC Comics series, The Terrifics (2018–2020).

== Tom Strong's Terrific Tales ==
Tom Strong's Terrific Tales was an anthology spin-off from the parent title. The series ran for twelve issues, and would be sporadically published over the space of a couple of years.

It usually featured three regular stories in each issue:

- One story would usually focus on Tom Strong, or on one of his supporting cast, and be either experimental or humorous in tone.
- Another would be a Young Tom Strong tale (set during Strong's formative years on Attabar Teru, and illustrated by Alan Weiss).
- A Jonni Future story (by Steve Moore and Arthur Adams) would often round out the issue.

Stories of note include:

- A silent story in which Tesla steals the keys to the Hyper-Saucer and parties on another planet (art by Jaime Hernandez; appeared in issue #1)
- King Solomon in a solo adventure (by Leah Moore and Sergio Aragonés; appeared in issue #5)
- A prose history of Millennium City, with illustrations by Michael Kaluta (appeared in issue #9)
- Another silent story, with art by Peter Kuper (appeared in issue #10)
- A collaboration between Alan Moore and Peter Bagge, which recasts the Strong family in a milieu not unlike the one used by Bagge in his Buddy Bradley stories. This was printed in the final issue (#12), and features appearances by characters resembling Dick Tracy, Fred Flintstone and the Kool-Aid Man.

== Limited series ==
In 2010, Peter Hogan and Chris Sprouse produced the six-issue series Tom Strong and the Robots of Doom, followed by six-issue story Tom Strong and the Planet of Peril in 2013.

== Collected editions ==
The Tom Strong series been collected in several formats:

Individual volumes

- Tom Strong: Book One, issues #1–7 (hardcover: ISBN 1-56389-654-0, paperback: ISBN 1-84023-228-5)
- Tom Strong: Book Two, issues #8–14 (hardcover: ISBN 1-84023-456-3, paperback: ISBN 1-56389-880-2)
- Tom Strong: Book Three, issues #15–19 (hardcover: ISBN 1-4012-0282-9, paperback: ISBN 1-4012-0285-3)
- Tom Strong: Book Four, issues #20–25 (hardcover: ISBN 1-4012-0571-2, paperback: ISBN 1-4012-0572-0)
- Tom Strong: Book Five, issues #26–30 (hardcover: ISBN 1-4012-0624-7, paperback: ISBN 1-4012-0625-5)
- Tom Strong: Book Six, issues #31–36 (hardcover: ISBN 1-4012-1108-9, paperback: ISBN 1-4012-1109-7)

Omnibuses

- Tom Strong: Deluxe Edition: Book 1, issues #1–12 (336 page, oversized hardcover: ISBN 1-4012-2536-5)
- Tom Strong: Deluxe Edition: Book 2, issues #13–24 (336 page, oversized hardcover: ISBN 1-4012-2680-9)
- Tom Strong Compendium, issues #1–36 (952 page, paperback: ISBN 9-781779-521729)

Limited series, spin-offs & cameos

- Tom Strong and the Robots of Doom, issues #1–6 (paperback: ISBN 1-4012-3174-8)
- Tom Strong and the Planet of Peril, issues #1–6 (paperback: ISBN 1-4012-4645-1)
- Tom Strong's Terrific Tales: Book One, issues #1–6 (hardcover: ISBN 1-4012-0030-3, paperback: ISBN 1-4012-0029-X)
- Tom Strong's Terrific Tales: Book Two, issues #7–12 (hardcover: ISBN 1-4012-0615-8, paperback: ISBN 1-4012-0029-X)
- Terra Obscura: S.M.A.S.H. of Two Worlds, Terra Obscura volume 1 #1–6, Terra Obscura volume 2 #1–6, and “ABC A–Z: Terra Obscura and Splash Brannigan” (paperback: ISBN 1-4012-4280-4)
- America's Best Comics, containing the short story Skull & Bones, the 64–page story The Many Worlds of Tesla Strong and the original one–page cameo from the ABC Preview (softcover: ISBN 1-84023-813-5)
- Tom Strong Compendium v. 2, Tom Strong's Terrific Tales #1–12, Tom Strong and the Robots of Doom #1–6, Tom Strong and the Planet of Peril #1–6, and The Many Worlds of Tesla Strong, and material from Americas Best Comics Special, ABC A–Z: Tom Strong and Jack B. Quick, ABC A–Z, Top 10 and Teams, and America's Best Comics ABC Sketchbook. (752 page, paperback)

== Awards ==
The story "How Tom Strong Got Started" in Tom Strong #1 was a top vote-getter for the Comics Buyer's Guide Fan Award for Favorite Story for 2000.
