= List of United States–themed superheroes =

The following is a list of superheroes with names or overt motifs relating to the United States, usually (though not necessarily) with an overtly patriotic character. Characters are listed alphabetically by publisher.

== A.C. Comics ==
- Captain Freedom
- Fighting Yank
- Miss Victory
- Yankee Girl

== Amalgam Comics ==
- American Belle
- Super-Soldier

== Archie Comics ==
- Captain Flag
- Shield
- Lancelot Strong

== Battle Fever J ==
- Miss America (Diane Martin)
- Miss America (Maria Nagisa)

== Cartoon Network ==
- Major Glory (Dexter's Laboratory)

== Crestwood Publications ==
- Yank & Doodle (Prize Publications)

== Dark Horse Comics ==
- The American

== DC Comics ==
- Agent Liberty
- American Eagle (Zoo Crew member)
- The Americommando (Crusaders member)
- The Americommando (Tex Thompson)
- The Comedian
- Commander Steel
- Fighting American
- General Glory
- Lady Liberty
- Liberty Belle
- Major Victory
- Mayflower
- Minute-Man
- Miss America
- Mister America
- Peacemaker
- Red, White and Blue
- Silent Majority
- Skyman
- Skyrocket
- Sparkler
- Stars/Stargirl
- Star-Spangled Kid
- Stripesy/S.T.R.I.P.E.
- Superman
- Uncle Sam
- Wonder Woman
- Yankee Poodle
  - See also Freedom Fighters, Freedom's Ring, Force of July, Justice League of America, Justice Society of America.

== Dynamite Entertainment ==
- Homelander

== Fox Features Syndicate ==
- The Eagle
- U.S. Jones

== G-Man Comics ==
- American Eagle
- Champion of Liberty²
- Lady Victory
- Sgt. Flag
- Simon N. Kirby, The Agent

== Heroic Publications ==
- Liberty Girl

=== Homage Comics ===
- The All American (Astro City)
- The Frontiersman (Astro City)
- The Old Soldier (Astro City)

== Impact Comics ==
- American Shield
- Original Shield
- Shield

== Image Comics ==
- The Badge (Big Bang Comics)
- The Defender of Liberty (Battle Hymn)
- Liberty & Justice
- Mister U.S. (Big Bang Comics)
- Patriot/Flagg (Jason Miller) (Rising Stars)
- Sgt. States, America's Fighting Foot Soldier (Jack Staff)
- Superpatriot
- The Proud American (Battle Hymn)

== Marvel Comics ==
- American Ace
- American Dream
- American Eagle
- Battlestar
- Blue Eagle
- Bucky/Captain America
- Captain America
- Captain America (Isaiah Bradley)
- Citizen V
- Defender (Private Don Stevens) Timely Comics
- Falcon/Captain America
- Free Spirit
- Iron Patriot
- Jack Flag
- Josiah X
- Miss America (America Chavez)
- Miss America (Madeline Joyce)
- Nuke
- Old Soldier (Supreme Power)
- Patriot
- Patriot (Jeffrey Mace)
- Phantom Eagle
- Rusty (Defender's Sidekick) Timely Comics
- The Spirit of '76
- The Spirit of '76 (Crusaders member))
- U.S. Agent
- US Archer
- The Yankee Clipper
  - See also Liberty Legion, Young Allies

== Nedor Comics/Terra Obscura ==
- American Crusader
- American Eagle
- The Fighting Yank
- The Fighting Spirit
- The Liberator
  - See also Society of Modern American Science Heroes

== Organic Comix ==
- ShieldMaster

== New England Comics ==
- American Maid (The Tick supporting character)

== Multiple publishers ==
- Fighting American (Awesome Entertainment, DC Comics, Harvey Comics, Marvel Comics, Prize Comics, Titan Comics)

== Overwatch ==
- Soldier 76

== Samurai Flamenco ==
- Mr. Justice

== Street Fighter ==
- Guile

== Wildstorm ==
=== America's Best Comics ===
Miss America

- The First American (Tomorrow Stories)
- U.S.Angel (Tomorrow Stories)
- Spirit of '76 (Top 10: The Forty-Niners)
  - See also America's Best, The Strongmen of America, Society of Modern American Science Heroes and Nedor Comics above.

== Weekly Shonen Jump ==
- Star and Stripe
