= List of romance comics =

List of romance comments

Starting in the late 1940s, several American comic book publishers sought out older audiences by creating a new genre: romance comics. Although the genre had waned in popularity by the 1970s, romance comics continue to be produced in the 2000s. Postwar Britain was also a market for romance comics.

== Titles ==
- 100% (DC/Vertigo, 2002 – 2003)
- All True Romances (1955-1958)
- Boy Loves Girl (1952-1956)
- Brides in Love (Charlton Comics, 1956 – 1965)
- Career Girl Romances (Charlton Comics, 1964 - 1973)
- Cinderella Love (Ziff Davis/St. John Publications, 1950 – 1955) — acquired by St. John in 1953
- Cindy Comics (Marvel Comics, 1947 – 1950)
- Date with Debbi (DC, Jan./Feb. 1969 – 1972)
- A Date with Judy (79 issues, Oct./Nov. 1947-Nov. 1960)
- Diary Loves/G.I. Sweethearts/Girls in Love (Quality Comics, 1949 – 1956)
- Dotty Comics (Ace Magazines, 1948–1949) — Title changes to "Glamorous Romances" at issue #41
- Falling in Love (DC Comics, 1949 – 1973)
- First Love Illustrated (Harvey Comics, 1949 - 1963)
- Flaming Love (Quality Comics, 1949 – 1950)
- Forbidden Tales of Dark Mansion (DC Comics, 1971–1974) — started out as Gothic romance
- Girl Comics vol. 1 (Timely/Atlas, 1949 - 1954)
- Girls' Love Stories (DC Comics, 1949 – 1973)
- Girls' Romances (DC Comics, 1950 – 1971)
- Glamorous Romances (Ace Magazines, 1949–1956) — Formerly titled "Dotty Comics"
- Haunted Love (Charlton Comics, 1973 – 1975) — Gothic romance
- Heart Throbs (Quality Comics/DC Comics, 1949 – 1972) — acquired by DC in 1957
- Hi-School Romances (1949)
- Hollywood Romances/For Lovers Only (Charlton Comics, 1966 – 1976)
- I ♥ Marvel (Marvel Comics, 2006)
- I Love You (Charlton Comics, 1955 - 1980)
- Ideal Romance (Quality Comics, 1954 – 1955)
- Just Married (Charlton Comics, 1958 - 1976)
- Lore Olympus (WEBTOON, 2018–Present)
- Love and Romance (Charlton Comics, 1971 - 1975)
- Love Confessions (Quality Comics, 1949 – 1956)
- Love Diary (Charlton Comics, 1958 - 1976)
- Love Lessons (Harvey Comics, 1949 – 1950)
- Love Letters (Quality Comics, 1949 - 1956)
- Love Romances (Marvel Comics, 1949 - 1963)
- Love Scandals (Quality Comics, 1950)
- Lovelorn/Confessions of the Lovelorn (American Comics Group, 1949 - 1960)
- Millie the Model (Marvel Comics, 1945 - 1973)
- Modern Love (1949)
- My Date Comics (Hillman Periodicals, 1947–1948) — romance/humor mixture by Simon & Kirby
- My Love Life (Fox Comics, 1949 – 1951)
- My Love Secret... (Fox Comics, 1949 – 1950)
- My Only Love (Charlton Comics, 1975 - 1976)
- My Secret Life (Charlton Comics, 1957 - 1962)
- Night Nurse (Marvel Comics, 1972 – 1973)
- Our Love Story (Marvel Comics)
- Patsy Walker (Marvel Comics, 1945 - 1965)
- Popular Teen-Agers (Star Publications, 1950 – 1954)
- Radiant Love (Key Publications, 1953 – 1954)
- Range Romances (Quality Comics, 1949–1950) — Western/romance mix
- Romantic Adventures/My Romantic Adventures (American Comics Group, 1949 – 1964)
- Romance Tales (Marvel Comics, 1949 – 1950)
- Romantic Marriage (Ziff Davis/St. John Publications, 1950 – 1954) — acquired by St. John in 1953
- Romantic Secrets (Fawcett Comics/Charlton Comics, 1949 – 1964) — acquired from Fawcett in 1953
- Romantic Story (Fawcett Comics/Charlton Comics, 1949 - 1973) — acquired from Fawcett in 1954
- Secret Hearts (DC, 1949 - 1971)
- Secret Love Stories (Fox Comics, 1949)
- Secret Romance (Charlton Comics, 1968 - 1980)
- Secrets of Love And Marriage (Charlton Comics, 1956 - 1961)
- Sleepless (Image Comics, 2017–2019)
- Strange Confessions (Ziff Davis, 1952)
- Strange Love (Fox Comics, 1950)
- Superman's Girl Friend, Lois Lane (DC Comics, 1958 – 1974)
- Sweetheart Diary (Charlton Comics, 1955 - 1962)
- Sweethearts (Fawcett Comics/Charlton Comics, 1948 - 1973) — acquired from Fawcett in 1954
- Teen Confessions (Charlton Comics, 1959 - 1976)
- Teen-Age Confidential Confessions (Charlton Comics, 1960 - 1964)
- Teen-Age Love (Charlton Comics, 1958 - 1973)
- Teen-Age Romances (St. John Publications, 1949 – 1955)
- Teen-Age Temptations (St. John Publications, 1952 - 1954)
- Tender Romance/Ideal Romance/Diary Confessions (Key Publications, 1953 – 1956)
- Time for Love vol. 2 (Charlton Comics, 1967 - 1976)
- Trouble (Epic Comics, 2003)
- True Life Secrets (Charlton Comics, 1951 – 1956)
- True Stories of Romance (Fawcett Comics, 1950)
- True War Romances/Exotic Romances (Quality Comics, 1952 - 1956) — romance/war mix
- Untamed Love (Quality Comics, 1950)
- Wedding Bells (Quality Comics, 1954–1956)
- Young Love (Crestwood Publications, 1947 – 1956, 1960 – 1963; DC Comics, 1963 – 1977)
- Young Romance (Crestwood Publications/DC Comics, 1947 – 1975) — acquired from Crestwood in 1963

== See also ==
- List of romance manga
