= Frankenstein (Prize Comics) =

1940-1954 American comic book series

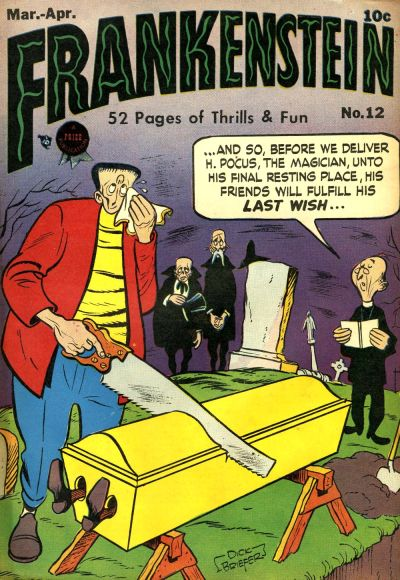
- The monster, from Prize Comics' Frankenstein #12 (April 1948), art by Dick Briefer.

Publication information
- Publisher: Crestwood Publications
- First appearance: Prize Comics #7 (Dec. 1940)
- Created by: Dick Briefer

There have been many comic book adaptations of the monster story created by Mary Shelley in her 1818 novel Frankenstein; or, The Modern Prometheus. Writer-artist Dick Briefer presented two loose adaptations of the story in publisher Prize Comics' successive series Prize Comics and Frankenstein from 1940 to 1954. The first version represents what comics historians call American comic books' first ongoing horror feature.

== Publication history ==
=== Comics' first horror feature ===
In Prize Comics #7 (cover-dated Dec. 1940), writer-artist Dick Briefer (using the pseudonym "Frank N. Stein" in the latter role) introduced the eight-page feature "New Adventures of Frankenstein", an updated version of 19th-century novelist Mary Shelley's much-adapted Frankenstein monster. Considered by comics historians to be "America's first ongoing comic book series to fall squarely within the horror genre", the feature, set in New York City circa 1930, starred a guttural, rampaging creature actually dubbed "Frankenstein" (unlike Shelley's nameless original monster).

In Prize Comics #11 (June 1941), Briefer dropped the "Frank N. Stein" pen name of the previous three stories and introduced the doctor's adopted son Denny "Bulldog" Dunsan as Frankenstein's ongoing antagonist. Prize Comics #24 (Oct. 1942) pitted the monster against Bulldog and publisher Prize Comics' superheroes the Black Owl, the Green Lama, and Dr. Frost; the non-superpowered teens Yank and Doodle ("America's Fighting Twins"); and the namesake characters from the humor feature "General and the Corporal". In some stories, the monster also teamed up with two other occult menaces, the Witch and the Mummy.

As with many comics characters of the time, the monster found himself in the European theater of World War II fighting Nazis. In 1942, scientist Dr. Ullrich offers a bride for Frankenstein, in exchange for the monster resolving to aid humans instead of fighting them, but an angry mob burns down the lab, killing both Ullrich and the bride.

=== Horror to humor ===
Prize Comics #33 (Aug 1943) brought an abrupt change to the strip. Another scientist, Professor Carroll, performs another experiment that makes Frankenstein look and act more human. A caption explains, "Frankenstein has left behind him a trail of wrecks, disaster, tragedy and murder – but, as we said, he has left it behind him, for thanks to the miraculous work of a great scientist, Frankenstein is a changed person! With a new suit of clothes, a haircut and a facial, he goes out to become a part of human society!" The humanized monster spends a few issues helping with national defense, and then enrolls in grade school.

The character shifted back to horror for a brief period in 1944, beginning with February's Prize Comics #39. The monster was brainwashed by the Nazis to destroy the resistance in occupied territory. The character managed to break free of his conditioning and destroy the Germans' hypnosis machine, but then rampaged through Europe for a while with a female vampire, Zora, and a male zombie, Rollo. After a while, the three characters moved to New York City and opened a hotel for monsters.

Eight-page Frankenstein stories by Briefer appeared in every issue of Prize Comics from #7-68 a.k.a. vol. 7, #1 (Dec. 1940 - March 1948), with the exception of issues #10 and #55.

=== Solo comic ===
Briefer's better-known version of the Frankenstein monster, however, developed upon the monster's return from the war. The character was so popular at that point that they gave him his own series, with Frankenstein #1 (1945).

Like many returning veterans, Frankenstein settled into small-town life, becoming a genial neighbor who "began having delightful adventures with Dracula, the Wolfman and other horrific creatures. The only two times he was featured on the Prize Comics cover (both in 1947), he was referred to as 'The Merry Monster'". Briefer, with his trademark "loose and smooth ink and brush skills" began telling stories that would "straddle some amorphous line between pure children's humor and adventure and an adult sensibility about the world".

In his book Art Out of Time: Unknown Comics Visionaries 1900-1969, author Dan Nadel described Briefer as

...one of the few guys in the 1940s who had that loose, gestural art style that's funny. The drawing is inherently funny. Which is really unusual for humor comics of the time ... [in that] it's tight drawing. It's self-contained and beautiful. But Briefer is all over the place. When he does these swooping pratfalls that Frankenstein takes, the lines actually reflect the gag. It's nice. [...] And they're funny as comics. They read well and are beautifully drawn; they're full of unforgettable images, like the wizard eating Frankenstein on a hot dog. You'll never forget it, for better or for worse.

Briefer's humorous Frankenstein ran through Prize Comics #68 (March 1948), and his humorous Frankenstein ran through issue #17 (Feb. 1949). Three years later, Briefer (1915–1980) revived the series with his original, horrific Frankenstein from #18-33 (March 1952 - Nov. 1954).

Following the cancellation of Frankenstein during an era that put much pressure on horror comics and other violent comic books, leading to the creation of the Comics Code, Briefer left the comic industry for commercial advertising art.

== Reprint collections ==
- Briefer, Dick. The Monster of Frankenstein (Idea Men Productions, 2006) ISBN 1-4196-4017-8, ISBN 978-1-4196-4017-9
- Briefer, Dick. Dick Briefer's Frankenstein (Library of Horror Comics' Masters, IDW/Yoe Books, 2010) ISBN 1-60010-722-2

== See also ==
- Frankenstein (comics)
