= Young Love (comics) =

Romance comics title

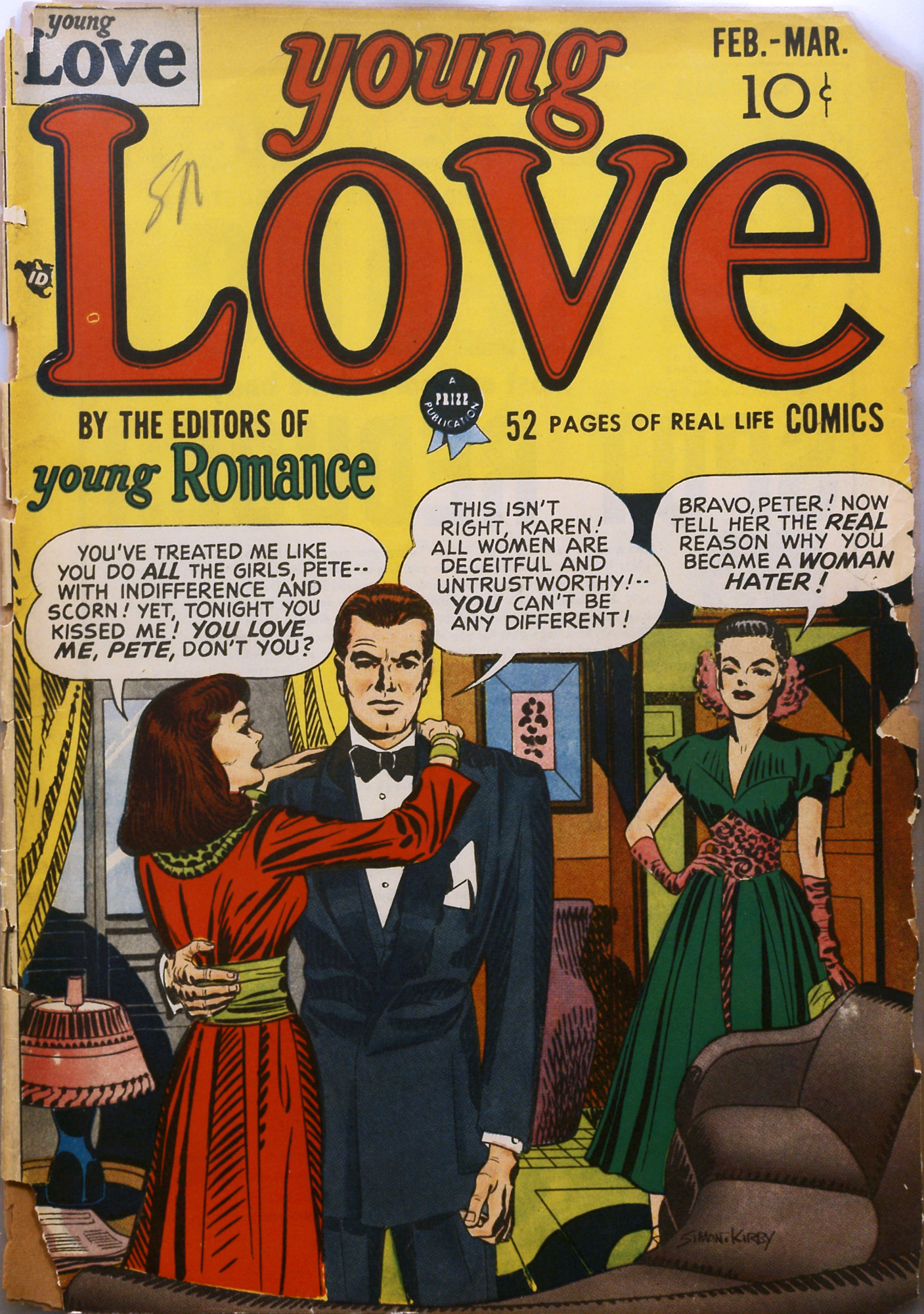
- Cover to Young Love #1 (February 1949), art by Joe Simon & Jack Kirby.

Publication information
- Publisher: Crestwood/Prize; DC Comics
- Schedule: Monthly/bi-Monthly
- Publication date: (vol. 1): 1949–56; All for Love: 1957–59 (vol. 2) (Cr./Pr.): 1960–63 (vol. 2) (DC): 1963–77
- No. of issues: (vol. 1): 73 (#1–73); All for Love: 17 (#1–17) (vol. 2) (Cr./Pr.): 21 (#18–38) (vol. 2) (DC): 88 (#39–126)

Creative team
- Created by: Joe Simon & Jack Kirby
- Written by: various, inc. (Joe Simon)
- Artist(s): various, inc. (Joe Simon, Jack Kirby, Mort Meskin, Leonard Starr, John Romita Sr.)

Young Love is one of the earliest romance comics titles, and was published by Crestwood/Prize and later sold to DC Comics.

== History ==
After the Sept./Oct. 1947 release of Crestwood/Prize's genre-launching Young Romance comic (arguably the first romance comic) by the prolific team of Simon & Kirby sold "millions of copies", the company (and duo) swiftly prepared a separate spin-off title to capitalise on the success of this new genre. Launched amid imitators from (among others) Quality Comics, Fawcett Publications, Fox Features Syndicate and Timely Comics, Crestwood/Prize's companion title Young Love was released "less than a year and a half" after the debut of Young Romance, and it also sold well.

== Publication history ==
Launched in February 1949, Young Love ran initially for 73 issues, until December 1956. Four months later (Apr/May 1957), Prize launched All for Love, which ran for 17 issues until Feb/Mar 1959, when it went on a year's hiatus, returning the following year and retitled Young Love. This retitled series then ran for 21 issues between February 1960 and June 1963, whereupon Crestwood/Prize sold this and other titles to DC Comics, who produced a further 88 issues between 1963 and 1977.

=== Declining sales ===
DC's Young Love #39, art by John Romita Sr.

Criticised somewhat (as was the whole comics industry) during the mid-1950s Seduction of the Innocent-inspired Comic Book Hearings (part of the Senate Subcommittee hearings on the causes of juvenile delinquency), "love" or "romance" comics began to sell less well, and by 1963, Crestwood/Prize "got out of the comic book business", selling many of their titles (including Young Romance and Young Love) to DC Comics.

=== DC Comics ===
DC gained Crestwood/Prize's titles when Crestwood Publications stopped producing comics in 1963, and they continued publishing their romance comics as "part of a reasonably popular romance line aimed at young girls" for nearly 15 years.

Taking over publication of Young Love after 17 issues of All for Love and 21 of Young Love vol. 2, DC continued the original numbering, launching the newly branded title with Sept.-Oct. 1963's issue #39. Issues #107 (Dec. 1973-Jan. 1974) to #114 (Feb.-March 1975) of the series were in the 100 Page Super Spectacular format. The revised series ran for almost 15 years, finally ceasing publication with July 1977's issue #126.

== Awards ==
Young Love won the 1969 Alley Award for "Best Romance Title".

=== Reprints ===
In 2012, #39–56 was reprinted in Showcase Presents Young Love Volume 1.

== See also ==
- Young Lust
