= 1947 in comics =

Notable events of 1947 in comics.

== Events and publications ==
=== January ===
- January 11: The Crab with the Golden Claws premiers, a stop-motion film directed by Claude Misonne (pseudonym for Simone Swaelens). This is the first animated film based on Hergé's popular comics series The Adventures of Tintin.
- January 13: Milton Caniff's Steve Canyon makes its newspaper debut.
- January: Jean-Michel Charlier and Victor Hubinon's Buck Danny makes its debut in Spirou.
- Captain America Comics (1941 series) #60 - Timely Comics
- Marvel Mystery Comics (1939 series) #80 - Timely Comics
- Eerie, a one-shot horror comic book published by Avon Periodicals as Eerie #1. The book holds the distinction of being the first true, stand-alone horror comic book and is credited with establishing the horror comics genre.

=== February ===
- Joker Comics (1942 series) #26 - Timely Comics

=== March ===
- March 10: Marten Toonder's Tom Poes is resyndicated in the Dutch newspapers De Nieuwe Rotterdamsche Courant and De Volkskrant after being interrupted since the Liberation in 1944.
- Captain America Comics (1941 series) #61 - Timely Comics
- Marvel Mystery Comics (1939 series) #81 - Timely Comics
- The first episode of Harry Hanan's comic series Louie is published. The series will run until 1976.

=== April ===
- April 3: The Flemish comics magazine 't Kapoentje makes its debut. It wil run until 1989.
- April 11: Peyo first publishes his comic strip Johan in La Dernière Heure, which will become Johan and Peewit in 1954.
- April 14: The first issue of the Filipino comics magazine Bulaklak Magazine is published.
- April 14: Charles Kuhn's newspaper comic Grandma makes its debut.
- April 26: Marten Toonder's Tom Poes story De Watergeest is first published. Halfway the story major Dirk Dickerdack and Markies de Canteclaer make their debut.
- Captain America Comics (1941 series) #62 - Timely Comics
- Human Torch Comics (1940 series) #26 - Timely Comics
- Sub-Mariner Comics (1941 series) #22 - Timely Comics
- The first episode of Lib Abrena's Ipo-Ipo is published.

=== May ===
- Joker Comics (1942 series) #27 - Timely Comics
- Marvel Mystery Comics (1939 series) #82 - Timely Comics

=== June ===
- June 8: The first episode of Charles M. Schulz' Li'l Folks is published. It will run until 1950.
- June 21: Marten Toonder's Tom Poes story De Talisman is first published. Halfway the story the antagonist Joris Goedbloed makes his debut. He will later also become a recurring character in Panda.
- June 29: Marc Sleen first publishes his gag cartoon series De Ronde van Frankrijk, in which he chronicles every tournament of the annual Tour de France. He will continue this series up and until July 1964.
- The Dutch comics magazine Sjors, which was already published between 1936 and 1942, reappears but every two weeks instead of each week.
- Sub-Mariner Comics (1941 series) #23 - Timely Comics

=== Summer ===
- Joker Comics (1942 series) #28 - Timely Comics

=== July ===
- July 1: Willy Vandersteen leaves newspaper De Nieuwe Gids and takes his successful comics series Suske en Wiske with him. About 25.0000 readers instantly subscribe to De Standaard, the paper where the series will be published from now on.
- July 23: Mars Ravelo and Nestor Redondo 's superheroine Varga (renamed Darna from 1950 on) makes her debut in Bulaklak Magazine.
- Captain America Comics (1941 series) #63 - Timely Comics
- Human Torch Comics (1940 series) #27 - Timely Comics
- Marvel Mystery Comics (1939 series) #83 - Timely Comics

=== August ===
- August 24: In one episode of Will Eisner's The Spirit the Spirit is temporarily blinded and remains to for several episodes.
- Malang's Kosme the Cop makes its debut.

=== September ===
- September 22: In the Mickey Mouse story The Man of Tomorrow by Billy Walsh and Floyd Gottfredson Eega Beeva makes his debut.
- Hoppy the Marvel Bunny, with issue #15, canceled by Fawcett Comics.

=== Fall ===
- Joker Comics (1942 series) #29 - Timely Comics

=== October ===
- October 2: Marc Sleen's comic strip De Avonturen van Detectief Van Zwam starring Detective Van Zwam makes its debut in the newspaper De Nieuwe Gids. Halfway the story Van Zwam meets Nero who will soon become his sidekick and eventually the main protagonist of the series, which will then be known as The Adventures of Nero. It will run uninterruptedly until 2002 and is drawn singlehandedly by Sleen for its first 45 years.
- Captain America Comics (1941 series) #64 - Timely Comics
- Human Torch Comics (1940 series) #28 - Timely Comics
- Marvel Mystery Comics (1939 series) #84 - Timely Comics

=== November ===
- November 6: After Willy Vandersteen's departure 't Kapoentje lets Bob De Moor create a replacement comic for Vandersteen's De Vrolijke Bengels, which becomes the long-running series De Lustige Kapoentjes. De Moor's version will continue until December 1949.
- November 28: The Dutch comics magazine Tom Poes Weekblad based on the popularity of Marten Toonder's Tom Poes makes its debut, but will only last until June 1951. One of the features to debut in the magazine is the comic series Bas en Van der Pluim by Frits Godhelp.
- Human Torch Comics (1940 series) #29 - Timely Comics
- More Fun Comics, with issue #127 (November/December cover date), is cancelled by DC Comics.
- Sub-Mariner Comics (1941 series) #24 - Timely Comics

=== December ===
- The Donald Duck story Christmas on Bear Mountain is published, which marks the debut of Scrooge McDuck.
- The first issue of the Dutch comics magazine Okidoki is published, which in 1949 will change its name to Jumbo. It will run until 1951.

=== Winter ===
- Joker Comics (1942 series) #30 - Timely Comics

=== Specific date unknown ===
- Helge Hall Jensen's long-running comics series Hans og Grete makes its debut.
- The Girl Guides make their debut in Rupert Bear.
- In the Kapitein Rob story Het Pinguïnland van Professor Lupardi Kapitein Rob's mortal enemy Professor Lupardi makes his debut.
- Larry Alcala's Siopawman and the long-running series Kalabog & Bosyo makes their debut.

== Births ==
=== April ===
- April 22: Steve Englehart, American comic book writer (Green Lantern, Justice League, Captain America, Fantastic Four).

=== August ===
- August 25: Michael Kaluta, American comic book artist and writer (House of Mystery, The Shadow).
- August 30: Jack C. Harris, American comic book writer (Detective Comics, Wonder Woman, House of Mystery, Sgt. Rock).

=== September ===
- September 13: Mike Grell, American comic book writer and artist (Action Comics, Green Lantern, Legion of Super-Heroes).
- September 20: Steve Gerber, American comic book writer (Marvel Comics, DC Comics, creator of Howard the Duck), (d. 2008).

=== November ===
- November 12: Carlos Ezquerra, Spanish comics artist (Judge Dredd), (d. 2018).

== Deaths ==
=== February ===
- February 10: Charles A. Voight, American comics artist (Betty), dies at age 60.
- February 13: Wiley Padan, American illustrator and comics artist (It's True!), dies at age 46 from a heart condition.
- February 27: Cemal Nadir Güler, Turkish comics artist (Amcabey, Efruz Bey, Dalkavuk, Akla Kara, Yeni Zengin), dies at age 44.

=== March ===
- March 24: Frank Fiegel, American tramp and bar bouncer (inspiration for Popeye), dies at age 79.

=== April ===
- April 1: Crawford Young, American comics artist (Clarence, Pearl Button, The Tutts), dies at age 61.

=== May ===
- May 2: William Moulton Marston, American psychologist and comics writer (Wonder Woman), dies at age 53.
- May 16: Reginald Perrott, British illustrator and comics artist (worked for Amalgamated Press and Mickey Mouse Weekly), dies at age 32 from throat cancer.

=== August ===
- August 20: Max Gaines, American comics publisher (founder of All-American Publications, nowadays EC Comics), dies at age 52 in a boat accident.

=== October ===
- October 10: Joseph Jacinto Mora, Uruguayan-American illustrator, photographer, writer, sculptor, comics artist (Animaldom), dies at age 60.
- November 16: John Prentiss Benson, American painter, architect, illustrator and comics artist (The Woozlebeasts), dies at age 82.

=== Specific date unknown ===
- Mabel Francis Taylor, British illustrator and comics artist (The Little Sparrowkins, continued Jungle Jinks), dies at age 80 or 81.
- Rocha Vieira, Portuguese comics artist (Fitas de Juca e Zeca, As Proezas de Necas e Tonecas), dies at age 63 or 64.
- Joan D'Ivori, aka Joan Vila i Pujol, Spanish illustrator, painter and publisher (made some sequential illustrations), dies at age 56 or 57.

== First issues by title ==
- A Date with Judy (cover dated October–November) by DC Comics

== First appearance by character name ==
- Black Canary in Flash Comics #86 (August), created by Robert Kanigher and Carmine Infantino - DC Comics
- Casey the Cop by DC Comics in Action Comics
- Dagar, the Desert Hawk by Fox Feature Syndicate in All Great Comics #13 (December)
- Gentleman Ghost in Flash Comics #88 (October), created by Robert Kanigher and Joe Kubert - DC Comics
- Harlequin in All American Comics #89 (September), created by Robert Kanigher - DC Comics
- Paula Brooks in Sensation Comics #68 (August), created by Mort Meskin - DC Comics
- Icicle (comics) in All-American Comics #90 (October), created by Robert Kanigher and Irwin Hasen - DC Comics
- Per Degaton in All Star Comics #35 (June), created by John Broome and Irwin Hasen - DC Comics
- Sportsmaster in All-American Comics #85 (May), created by John Broome and Irwin Hasen - DC Comics
- Thorn in Flash Comics #89 (November), created by John Broome and Carmine Infantino - DC Comics
- Tomahawk in Star-Spangled Comics #69 (June) created by Joe Samachson and Edmond Good - DC Comics
- Tommy Tomorrow in Real Fact Comics #6 (January), created by Jack Schiff and George Kashdan - DC Comics
- Wizard (DC Comics) in All Star Comics #34 (April), created by Gardner Fox and Irwin Hasen - DC Comics
