= Atomic-Man =

Atomic Man

Publication information
- Publisher: Prize Comics
- First appearance: Headline Comics #16 (1945)
- Created by: Charles Voight

In-story information
- Alter ego: Adam Mann
- Species: Human
- Place of origin: Earth
- Abilities: Enchanted strength; Flight; Projecting energy beams

Atomic-Man is an American superhero created by Charles Voight who appeared in Headline Comics from issue #16 (Nov/Dec 1945) to #21 (Sept/Oct 1946) which were published by Prize Comics. He is often credited for being the first atomic superhero.

== Origin story ==
Dr. Adam Mann is experimenting with uranium-235 in the aftermath of the first atomic bomb being used in Hiroshima. During the experiment he finds himself being subjected to a strange side effect which changes his body. He finds that he has been changed into a new type of being, a being who was not only immune to most lethal radiations but was also immune to electricity, flame and even bullets.

In addition to the change in his body he also found he now possessed many different powers. These superpowers of his included the ability to see radiations which were previously invisible to normal humans. His right hand also now also emitted a large amount of Gamma radiation which allowed him to perform a number of superhuman deeds like punching through brick walls using energy blasts and controlling the minds of other people. When not using his powers he wore a lead glove in his hand to curtail the powers of radiation so as not to harm others.

Knowing that the element that had given him his powers could and would be used by others for evil he took the identity of Atomic-Man and dedicated himself to fighting those who might who would try to pervert its use, along with any other criminals, mad scientists or communists who fell under the glow of his right hand.
