= DC 100 Page Super Spectacular =

Comic book series

DC 100-Page Super Spectacular
- DC 100-Page Super Spectacular #DC-13 (June 1972), art by Neal Adams.

Publication information
- Publisher: DC Comics
- Schedule: Varied
- Format: Ongoing series
- Publication date: 1971 - November 1973
- No. of issues: 19; DC 100-Page Super Spectacular #4–6; DC 100-Page Super Spectacular #DC–7 – DC–13; 100-Page Super Spectacular #DC–14 – DC–22
- Editor: E. Nelson Bridwell

DC 100 Page Super Spectacular is an American comic book series published by DC Comics from 1971 through 1973, featuring only reprints initially and later including new stories. The "100 Page" count included both sides of the front and back covers as pages. Each numbered issue appearing under this title featured a wrap-around cover with all editorial content and no advertisements. Versions after late 1973 included advertisements.

== Publication history ==
The DC 100 Page Super Spectacular series was the "next wave" of "Giant" comics featuring reprint stories in the company's vast trove of tales during a 1971 editorial transition at DC Comics, when the Superman titles were taken over by Julius Schwartz after the retirement of Mort Weisinger, who had overseen all Superman-related comics since the early 1950s. The first DC Giant was the "80 Page Giant", which ran as an annual and then alternately as its own title and as part of regular, ongoing titles throughout the 1960s. Comics prices increased quickly in the early part of the 1970s. As page count dropped to accommodate the 25¢ price, the 80 Page Giant became simply "Giant" comics and DC then quickly switched to a monthly 52-page format at the 25¢ price point and DC 100 Page Super Spectacular series became the standard for "Giant" comics.

== Editorial ==
This comic series is one of E. Nelson Bridwell's contributions to DC's history and its growing array of characters. As DC acquired the rights to Quality Comics characters, Fawcett Comics characters, and other folded comics companies' characters, a quick way to secure their rights was by publishing reprints featuring these characters. DC characters such as Johnny Quick made reappearances in these reprints and sometimes gained some popularity among readers. These were stand-alone stories, all written to capture any first-time reader when they were originally published, so the reader needed no real introduction to many of these characters. There were brief synopses provided on the inside cover, identifying and giving background to the characters shown on the wraparound cover and a table of contents that provided any information one would need on Golden Age characters that had not been seen in a while. Johnny Quick makes the first of what will turn out to be numerous appearances in many of the 100 Pagers. Quality Comics characters such as Max Mercury (known in the Golden Age as "Quicksilver", and named such on the wraparound cover of DC-11), the Black Condor, the Ray and Doll Man made their first DC Comics appearances in these books.

== Collectibility ==
The books languished in relative obscurity in the collector's market for the first 20-odd years of their existence, their Overstreet Comic Book Price Guide estimated value from 1973–1995 not exceeding $3.00. However, these titles - particularly the first three issues - have now become some of the most sought-after Bronze Age books. Their Overstreet Comic Book Price Guide estimated value has increased from approximately $45.00 to hundreds of dollars each in the 1997-2006 editions. The first three issues were published in relatively small numbers and were entirely editorial content. DC-5, which was a romance comic and, therefore, published in very small numbers, has been heralded as the "rarest of all Bronze Age books" by the Overstreet Comic Book Price Guide. The first issue to feature super-heroes was DC-6 which had a wraparound cover by Neal Adams featuring the Justice League of America and Justice Society of America. This issue also listed every comic book character that DC owned in all of the spaces that otherwise would have been occupied by house ads. For the remainder of the series, super-heroes would dominate the title.

== Numbering ==
The series is numbered oddly. There were no issues 1, 2, or 3. The first three issues published (4, 5, and 6) had subtitles — the first two of which were later used for ongoing comics series. The title ran as a part of regular, ongoing series titles for seven issues with the prefix "DC" added to the numbering (DC-7 through DC-13) in addition to the masthead title's own numbering (e.g., Superman #245 was also DC-7). It reverted to its own title again (DC-14 through DC-22) utilizing as cover titles the existing titles of regular, ongoing series, but not being part of those regular series' numbering. A planned "DC-23" was mentioned in the letters column of DC-22 by editor E. Nelson Bridwell, but it became Shazam! #8 and the Super Spectacular's own numbering disappeared, while advertisements were added. The "DC 100 Page Super Spectacular" title itself was used on another 96 issues of varying regular, ongoing titles through 1975. It began to become a regular version of selected ongoing titles for about a year and then increased its cost to 60¢ with the publishing date of April–May 1974 and continued this pricing until its end. The last 100-Page Super Spectaculars were published with a cover date of March–April 1975.

== The issues ==
Issue	Date	Title	Notes
4	1971	Weird Mystery Tales	Reprints stories from My Greatest Adventure #8, 12, 14, 15, and 20; Sensation Mystery #110 and 116; House of Secrets #2; The Phantom Stranger #1; Tales of the Unexpected #15 and 24; and House of Mystery #49.
5	1971	Love Stories	Reprints stories from Young Love #60 and Girls' Romances #99, 100, and 130.
6	1971	World's Greatest Super-Heroes	Reprints stories from Justice League of America #21 and 22; More Fun Comics #55; Adventure Comics #190; Action Comics #146; The Brave and the Bold #36; and a previously unpublished Golden Age Wildcat story.
DC-7	December 1971– January 1972	Superman #245	Reprints stories from Superman #87 and 167; Kid Eternity #3; The Atom #3; All-Star Western #117; Detective Comics #66; and Mystery in Space #89.
DC-8	January 1972	Batman #238	Reprints stories from Batman #70 and 75; My Greatest Adventure #80; Police Comics #14; Sensation Comics #57; Adventure Comics #276 and 324; and a previously unpublished Golden Age Atom story.
DC-9	February 1972	Our Army at War #242	Reprints stories from G.I. Combat #44, 64, 68, and 108; Captain Storm #3; All-American Men of War #87; Our Fighting Forces #57; and Our Army at War #58.
DC-10	March 1972	Adventure Comics #416	Reprints stories from Action Comics #309, 310, and 324; Flash Comics #86; Wonder Woman #28; Police Comics #17; and Star Spangled Comics #90.
DC-11	April 1972	The Flash #214	Reprints stories from The Flash #122, 145, and 155; National Comics #67; Adventure Comics #179; Showcase #37; and a previously unpublished Golden Age Flash story.
DC-12	May 1972	Superboy #185	Reprints stories from Adventure Comics #208, 289, and 323; Star-Spangled Comics #55; The Brave and the Bold #60; Hit Comics #46; and Sensation Comics #1.
DC-13	June 1972	Superman #252	Reprints stories from Action Comics #47; Superman #17 and 146; More Fun Comics #57; Flash Comics #24; Crack Comics #18; Adventure Comics #67; and Smash Comics #17.
DC-14	March 1973	Batman	Reprints stories from Detective Comics #31, 32, and 156; Showcase #34; Blackhawk #10; Sensation Comics #4 and 6; and Doll Man #31.
DC-15	March 1973	Superboy	Reprints stories from Adventure Comics #81, 270, and 273; Detective Comics #65; Superboy #57, 63, and 130; The Hawk and the Dove #3; and House of Mystery #164.
DC-16	April 1973	Sgt. Rock	Reprints stories from Our Army at War #136; Captain Storm #1; All-American Men of War #82; Star Spangled War Stories #84; Our Fighting Forces #46; and G.I. Combat #88.
DC-17	June 1973	Justice League of America	Reprints stories from Justice League of America #23 and 43; All Star Comics #37; and Adventure Comics #65.
DC-18	July 1973	Superman	Reprints stories from Superman #25, 97, and 162; Flash Comics #90; The Atom #8; World's Finest Comics #5; Adventure Comics #57; and Crack Comics #42.
DC-19	August 1973	Tarzan	Reprints stories from the Tarzan newspaper strip by Russ Manning.
DC-20	September 1973	Batman	Reprints stories from Detective Comics #66, 68, and 80; All-American Comics #88; Flash Comics #95; Adventure Comics #66; Blackhawk #13; More Fun Comics #66; Sensation Comics #71
DC-21	October 1973	Superboy	Reprints stories from Superboy #50 and 94; Action Comics #313; Adventure Comics #117 and 332; Kid Eternity #9; and The Brave and the Bold #54.
DC-22	November 1973	The Flash	Reprints stories from The Flash #134 and 135; Adventure Comics #129; All-Flash #13; and Detective Comics #359.

== Other comics in the Super Spectacular format ==
Issues of on-going series which used the 100 Page Super Spectacular format include:

- Action Comics #437 (July 1974), 443 (January 1975)
- Batman #254–261 (January–February 1974 – March–April 1975)
- The Brave and the Bold #112–117 (April–May 1974 – February–March 1975)
- Detective Comics #438–445 (December 1973–January 1974 – February–March 1975)
- The Flash #229 (September–October 1974), 232 (March–April 1975)
- House of Mystery #224–229 (April–May 1974 – February–March 1975)
- Justice League of America #110–116 (March–April 1974 – March–April 1975)
- Our Army at War #269 (June 1974), 275 (December 1974)
- Shazam! #8 (December 1973), 12–17 (May–June 1974 – March–April 1975)
- Superboy #202 (June 1974), 205 (December 1974)
- Superman #272 (February 1974), 278 (August 1974), 284 (February 1975)
- The Superman Family #164–169 (April–May 1974 – February–March 1975)
- Tarzan #230–235 (April–May 1974 – February–March 1975)
- The Unexpected #157–162 (May–June 1974 – March–April 1975)
- The Witching Hour #38 (January 1974)
- Wonder Woman #211 (April–May 1974), 214 (October–November 1974)
- World's Finest Comics #223–228 (May–June 1974 – March 1975)
- Young Love #107–114 (December 1973–January 1974 – February–March 1975)
- Young Romance #197–204 (January–February 1974 – March–April 1975)

== Revival: DC 100-Page Comic Giant ==
In 2018, DC revived the 100-page format, featuring several concurrently running titles focusing on various DC characters, as well as a handful of one-shot issues. Monthly titles often feature between four and six separate serialized stories, reprinting previous material and providing new stories. One-shots may feature as many as nine stories, though they may all be reprinted material.

The revival titles were initially a Wal-Mart exclusive, which ended in October 2019. Certain issues still continue to have location exclusive covers. Titles include:

- Aquaman #1-4 (Oct. 2019 - June 2020)
- Batman Vol. 1 #1-14 (June 2018 - Aug. 2019)
- Batman Vol. 2 #1-5 (Nov. 2019 - July 2020)
- Batman: The Caped Crusader (one-shot) (Jan. 2020)
- Batwoman/Supergirl Worlds Finest (one-shot) (Dec. 2019)
- Birds of Prey (one-shot) (Jan. 2020)
- Crisis on Infinite Earths #1-2 (Jan. 2020)
- The Flash Vol. 1 #1-7 (Feb. 2019 - Aug. 2019)
- The Flash Vol. 2 #1-4 (Oct. 2019 - March 2020)
- From Beyond the Unknown (one-shot) (March 2020)
- Green Lantern 80th Anniversary 100-Page Super Spectacular (one-shot) (Aug. 2020)
- Ghosts (one-shot) (Oct. 2019)
- Justice League of America #1-7 (July 2018 - Jan. 2019)
- Our Fighting Forces (one-shot) (June 2020)
- Primal Age (one-shot) (Jan. 2019)
- Scooby-Doo (one-shot) (Sept. 2019)
- Super Hero Girls #1-2 (Nov. 2019 - March 2020)
- Superman Vol. 1 #1-16 (June 2018 - Oct. 2019)
- Superman Vol. 2 #1-3 (Jan. 2020 - May 2020)
- Swamp Thing Vol. 1 #1-7 (Feb. 2018 - Aug. 2018)
- Swamp Thing Vol. 2 #1-4 (Oct. 2019 - May 2020)
- Swing Thing Halloween Horror (one-shot) (Oct. 2018)
- Teen Titans #1-7 (July 2018 - Jan. 2019)
- Titans #1-7 (Feb. 2019 - Aug. 2019)
- Teen Titans Go! (one-shot) (Nov. 2019)
- Villains (one-shot) (Oct. 2019)
- Wonder Woman Vol. 1 #1-7 (Feb. 2019 - Aug. 2019)
- Wonder Woman Vol. 2 #1-4 (Oct. 2019 - April 2020)
- World's Greatest Super-Heroes Holiday Special (one-shot) (Nov. 2018)
