= Elmer Wexler =

Cartoonist

Elmer Wexler (August 14, 1918 - October 3, 2007) was an American illustrator and cartoonist. He is most famous for his work on comic strips and comic books in the 1940s, including being the inventor of the DC comic hero Miss America in 1941. He is credited with being the first artist to draw a soap-opera style comic strip, Vic Jordan, from 1941. Later he made his living from illustration, including books, magazines and record covers. He has also been credited as a co-creator of the obscure comic book character The Fighting Yank. He is the illustrator on a number of books about sports.

Wexler's record cover work was mainly for Grand Award Records, for whom he did almost as many illustrations as did Tracy Sugarman. These date from the late 1950s.
