= Fighting Yank =

Comic book character (from 1941)

Fighting Yank (Nedor Comics)
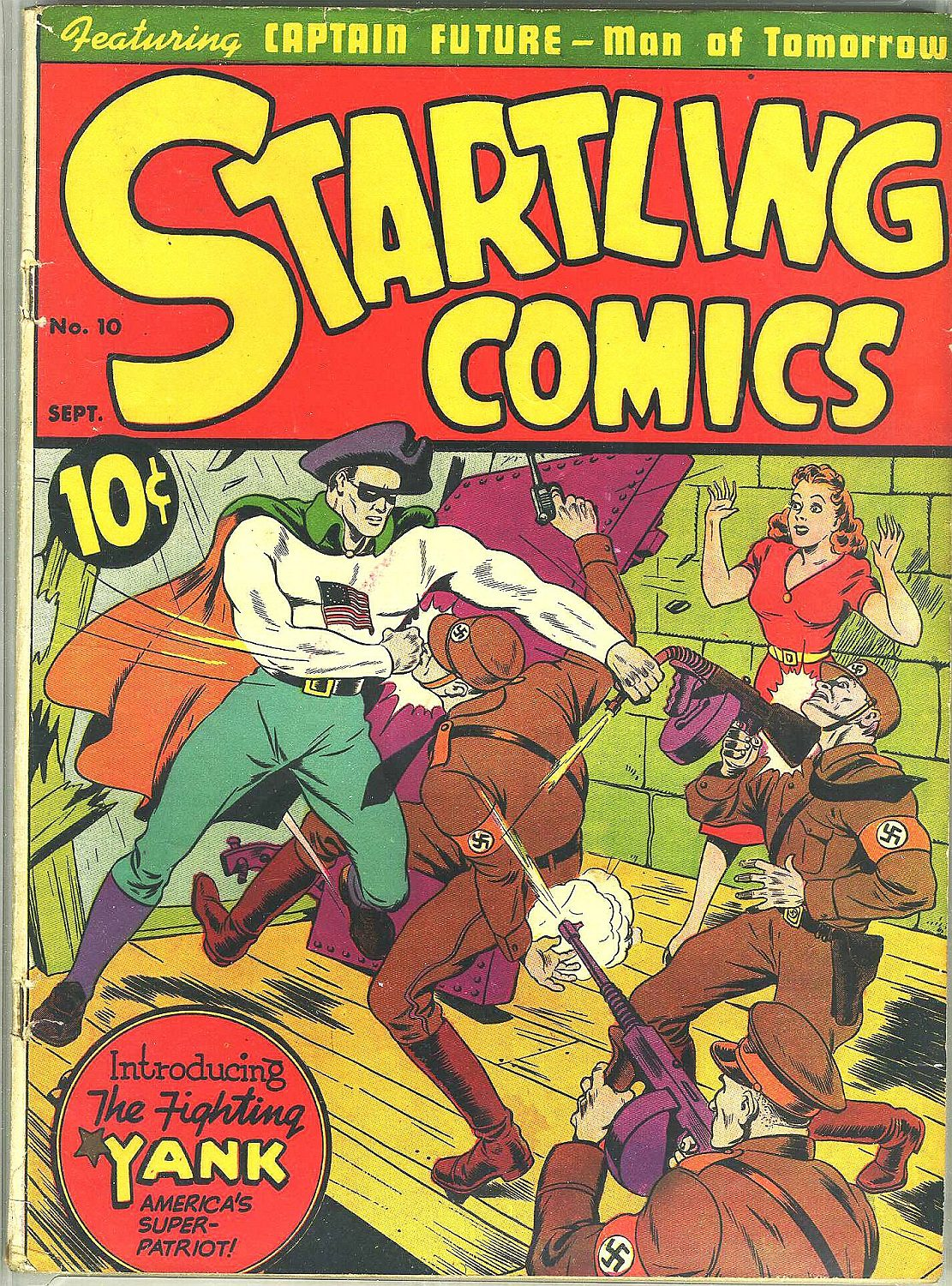
- Startling Comics #10 (September 1941), art by Elmer Wexler.

Publication information
- Publisher: Nedor Comics
- First appearance: Startling Comics #10 (September 1941)
- Created by: Richard E. Hughes; Jon L. Blummer

In-story information
- Alter ego: Bruce Carter III
- Team affiliations: SMASH
- Abilities: Superhuman strength; Invulnerability; Flight (with the aid of a magical cloak)

The Fighting Yank is the name of several superheroes, first appearing in Startling Comics #10 (Sept 1941).

Fall 1941 was a boom period for patriotic superheroes as the country prepared to enter World War II; during this period, comic book publishers also launched Miss Victory, Miss America, the Star-Spangled Kid, U.S. Jones, the Flag, Captain Flag and Yank and Doodle, among others.

== Nedor Comics ==
=== Publication history ===
The Fighting Yank first appeared in Nedor Comics' Startling Comics #10 (September 1941). He was created by writer Richard E. Hughes and artist Jon L. Blummer.

One of Nedor's more successful characters, the Yank outlived the war, ending his run in Startling Comics with issue #49 (Jan 1948). He also appeared in America's Best Comics from issue #9 (Nov 1944) through #25 (Feb 1948). Later artwork was produced by Jack Binder's studio, and by Elmer Wexler.

He also got his own title, billed as "America's Bravest Defender", starting in September 1942 and ending with issue #29 in August 1949. In issue #25 (July 1948), the character was given a facelift by artists Jerry Robinson and Mort Meskin, who worked together on The Black Terror. In the new version, the character lost the mask and wore a white pomaded wig. His bulletproof cloak and ability to call on his ancestor remained, but he lost his other powers.

=== Fictional character biography ===
Bruce Carter III obtains his superhuman powers when the ghost of his ancestor Bruce Carter I, a hero from the American War of Independence, appears to him and shows him the location of a magical cloak that could give the wearer invulnerability and super strength. Only Carter III's girlfriend, Joan Farwell, knows of his dual identity. Along with this magical cloak, Fighting Yank's outfit also includes a tri-corner hat, square buckles, an American flag on his chest, a white shirt, and blue pants.

The Yank's arch-nemesis, appearing for the first time in Startling Comics #13 (Feb 1942), is the evil scientist Dr. Mavelli, who has a device that erases men's faces and turns them into mindless slaves called the Faceless Legion. He also fights the Nazi Dr. Fantom and his werewolves, and Nitro-Man, who has nitroglycerin in his veins and has exploding punches.

=== Reception ===
In Secondary Superheroes of the Golden Age, Lou Mougin writes that "the Fighting Yank was a satisfying patriotic hero without seeming to be a Shield or Captain America knockoff. Symbolizing the Spirit of '76, drawing strength from a Revolutionary War ancestor, the Yank confirmed that America still had what it took to win a war... and it would need every bit of it in the current one".

== Timely Comics ==
The 1940s precursor of Marvel Comics had a character also named Fighting Yank who made a single appearance in Captain America Comics #17 (August 1942), in the story "The China Road", by writer-artist Jimmy Thompson. This Fighting Yank was American espionage agent Bill Prince, who fought Japanese agents in China under the code name Fighting Yank. Apart from a mention in the modern day U.S. Agent mini-series and unfinished All-Winners Squad: Band of Heroes miniseries (where he is a member of the Crazy Sues), he has not been seen since.

== AC Comics ==
AC Comics reprinted some of the Nedor Comics' Fighting Yank adventures beginning in 1994. The company then briefly revived the character, who made some appearances in the series Femforce before being killed in Femforce #35. Later on, in issue #71, the Golden Age hero known as the Hood was murdered, and Bruce Carter III's spirit was brought back to inhabit the Hood's body. With the help of Reddevil, Carter designed a new costume based on his old outfit, and the Hood's.

In 2001, the company launched a new series. Set in 1950s America, it found Fighting Yank and sidekick Kid Quick defending the U.S. from Cold War Communist enemies. The stories were written and drawn by Eric Coile in a style the creator said was an homage to Captain America and Fighting American co-creator Jack Kirby. Fighting Yank's costume was changed to resemble Fighting American.

== America's Best Comics/DC Comics ==
=== Bruce Carter III ===
Writer Alan Moore revived the original Nedor Comics Fighting Yank, Bruce Carter III, along with other Nedor characters, for his series Tom Strong, on the DC Comics imprint America's Best Comics. In Tom Strong #12 (June 2001), he revealed the Fighting Yank as a member of SMASH, a superhero group that had been placed in suspended animation after an alien invasion from the Moon in 1969. Awakened 30 years later, Fighting Yank joined his former comrades against those extraterrestrials. In the fight against the aliens, he was killed while trying to protect his daughter, Carol.

Fighting Yank (Carol Carter)
- Fighting Spirit, the successor to Fighting Yank (center) on the cover of ABC: A-Z, Terra Obscura and Splash Brannigan (2006). Art by Rachel Dodson and Terry Dodson.

Publication information
- Publisher: America's Best Comics
- First appearance: Tom Strong #11 (January 2001)
- Created by: Alan Moore (writer); Chris Sprouse (artist)

In-story information
- Alter ego: Carol Carter
- Team affiliations: SMASH
- Abilities: Superhuman strength; Invulnerability; Flight (with the aid of a magical cloak)

=== Carol Carter ===
Tom Strong #11 (January 2001) revealed that when Carol Carter had reached adulthood, she had gained the same powers as her father, and joined him in his fight against evil. In 1969, the two were placed in suspended animation alongside other members of the superhero team SMASH, and were awakened 30 years later. Carol lost her powers when her father was killed trying to save her life. With the disbanding of SMASH, she left her superhero career behind and became a teacher.

Moore's Terra Obscura spin-off series revealed that Carter III's spirit remained on Earth, but was unable to be seen or heard. Eventually, SMASH returns to action when the planet is threatened by hero-turned-villain Mystico. Acting on a suggestion from the Green Ghost, Carol tries on her late father's tri-corner hat. This allows her to see the ghost of her father, who gives her his mystical cloak, bestowing his former powers upon her once more. Bruce Carter III now aids Carol just as Bruce Carter I had done for him. Uncomfortable with the name Fighting Yank, since it was her father's identity, Carol finally decided on the hero name of "Fighting Spirit". She also entered into a romantic relationship with fellow superhero Ms. Masque.

== Dynamite Entertainment ==
Dynamite Entertainment announced in 2007 that Fighting Yank would be the protagonist among several other Golden Age characters appearing in the comic book series Project Superpowers, by writer Jim Krueger and cover artist and co-plotter Alex Ross.

During World War II, The Fighting Yank was ordered to retrieve Pandora’s Box from the clutches of Hitler (who had opened the box and ignited World War II as a result of the released evils). Under orders by the government and his ancestor's ghost, the Yank has to trap not only the evils of Pandora's Box (actually an urn), but also his fellow superheroes.

Decades after accomplishing his mission, Bruce Carter III, now an old man, is confronted by the American Spirit, who chastises him for his actions. Carter realized that his actions have only allowed evil to flourish instead and Bruce Carter I had manipulated him so as to free himself from the curse, and set out to free his former teammates. Fighting Yank succeeds in freeing his teammates, but is mortally wounded in a battle.

As he died, the Yank took on his ancestor's curse and became a partly solid ghost. This allowed him to arrive in time to save the other heroes. Yank then arrives to empower the Green Llama, allowing him to destroy the F-Troops.

== In other media ==
Mego Toy Company released an action figure named Fighting Yank in the late 1960s. The toy line was dropped in the 1960s after Mego was sued by Hasbro. The right hand had an imperfection that was intentionally left on production figures of Hasbro's G.I. Joe action figure. The District Court of New York found in Hasbro's favor. Fighting Yank resurfaced with an all new body in the early 1970s.
