= The Flag (Ace Comics) =

Ace Comics character

The Flag is a comic book superhero, first seen in Our Flag #2 (October 1941) (Ace Comics). The character continued in Our Flag until issue #5 (April 1942), and also appeared in Four Favorites #6 (July 1942). He was given two stories per issue — an expression of the publishers' confidence in the character — but he lasted for less than a year.

Fall 1941 was a boom period for patriotic superheroes as the country prepared to enter World War II; during this period, comic book publishers also launched Miss Victory, Miss America, the Star-Spangled Kid, U.S. Jones, the Fighting Yank, Captain Flag and Yank and Doodle, among others.

== Publication history ==
Lou Mougin writes that for the Flag's first issue in Our Flag #2, "Jim Mooney drew him on the cover, winging his way past busted Nazi planes, tanks, and Nazis. Behind him, he left a red-white-and-blue trail with stars. Can't be much more patriotically inclined than that". Mougin described the debut of the Flag as "a good origin, a good costume, good powers, a good weakness, and so-so art for the first story", and said that the further stories, drawn by Harry Anderson, were an improvement.

== Character biography ==
Disabled war veteran and flag-maker John Courtney ("Old Glory") finds a baby boy with a birthmark that resembles an American flag on his doorstep, on Flag Day. Believing there's something special about this child, he names him Jim and raises him as his son.

On Jim's 21st birthday, he has a vision of George Washington and Abraham Lincoln, telling him that "his life was selected by us to perform hard and dangerous tasks". He has the gift of super speed and the strength of 100 men, and he can't be hurt by any weapons. He can activate these powers by touching his birthmark. Jim takes on the alias "the Flag" and uses his powers to help others.

According to Jess Nevins' Encyclopedia of Golden Age Superheroes, "Jim uses these powers to fight enemies of America, whether domestic (crooked businessmen who seek to control the country) or foreign (Germans and Japanese)".
