= Dick Briefer =

American comic-book artist (1915-1980)

- Born: January 9, 1915
- Died: December 1980 (aged 65) Hollywood, Florida
- Areas: Penciller, Inker
- Pseudonyms: Richard Norman, Dick Hamilton, Frank N. Stein
- Notable works: Frankenstein

Richard Briefer (January 9, 1915 – December 1980) was an American comic-book artist best known for his various adaptations, including humorous ones, of the Frankenstein monster. Under the pseudonym Dick Hamilton, he also created the superhero team the Target and the Targeteers for Novelty Press.

== Biography ==
=== Early life and career ===
Dick Briefer studied at the Art Students League in Manhattan, New York City, and debuted in comic books in 1936 with work in Wow, What A Magazine!, one of the era's proto-comics "Comic books": tabloid-sized collections of comic strip reprints in color, which would later include occasional new comic strip-like material. Wow was edited by Jerry Iger, and when the comic ceased publication with issue #4 (cover-dated Nov. 1936), Briefer freelanced for the newly formed Eisner & Iger, one of the earliest "packagers" that produced complete comics on demand for publishers entering the fledgling medium.

Briefer's earliest recorded credit is as writer and artist of a five-page story beginning an adaptation of the 1831 Victor Hugo novel The Hunchback of Notre-Dame, in Jumbo Comics #1-8 & 10 (Sept. 1938 - July 1939 & Nov. 1939), for the Eisner-Iger client Fiction House. Other seminal work includes drawing and possibly writing the science-fiction adventure feature "Rex Dexter of Mars", which ran in several issues of Fox Comics' Mystery Men Comics; "Dynamo" in Fox's Science Comics; "Biff Bannon" in Harvey Comics' Speed Comics; "Storm Curtis" in Prize Comics' Prize Comics; and "Crash Parker" in Fiction House's Planet Comics. For Timely Comics, the precursor of Marvel Comics during the 1930s to 1940s period fans and historians call the Golden Age of Comic Books, Briefer created or co-created (writer credit unknown) the single-appearance superhero the Human Top in Red Raven #1 (Aug. 1940).

Also during this time he also drew the comic strip Pinky Rankin, about a Nazi-fighter, for the American Communist Party newspaper The Daily Worker.

=== Target and the Targeteers ===
Briefer, using the pen name Dick Hamilton, created the superhero team the Target and the Targeteers for Novelty Press in 1940. The Target first appeared in Target Comics #10 (Nov. 1940), and the Targeteers the following issue. The team starred in Target Comics through issue #95 / vol. 9, #5 (July 1948). Target itself ran 10 more issues.

=== Frankenstein ===
In Prize Comics #7 (Dec. 1940), writer-artist Briefer (using the pseudonym "Frank N. Stein" in the latter role) introduced the eight-page feature "New Adventures of Frankenstein", an updated version of the much-adapted Frankenstein monster created by Mary Shelley in her 1818 novel Frankenstein. Considered by comics historians to be "America's first ongoing comic book series to fall squarely within the horror genre", the feature, set in New York City circa 1930, starred a guttural, rampaging creature actually dubbed "Frankenstein" (unlike Shelley's nameless original monster).

Briefer's better-known version of the Frankenstein monster, however, developed upon the monster's return from the war, in Frankenstein #1 (undated, 1945), Frankenstein settled into small-town life, becoming a genial neighbor who "began having delightful adventures with Dracula, the Wolfman and other horrific creatures. Briefer, with his trademark "loose and smooth ink and brush skills" began telling stories that would "straddle some amorphous line between pure children's humor and adventure and an adult sensibility about the world".

In his book Art Out of Time: Unknown Comics Visionaries 1900-1969, author Dan Nadel described Briefer as

...one of the few guys in the 1940s who had that loose, gestural art style that's funny. The drawing is inherently funny. Which is really unusual for humor comics of the time ... [in that] it's tight drawing. It's self-contained and beautiful. But Briefer is all over the place. When he does these swooping pratfalls that Frankenstein takes, the lines actually reflect the gag. It's nice. [...] And they're funny as comics. They read well and are beautifully drawn; they're full of unforgettable images, like the wizard eating Frankenstein on a hot dog. You'll never forget it, for better or for worse.

Briefer's humorous Frankenstein ran through Prize Comics #68 (March 1948), and his humorous Frankenstein ran through issue #17 (Feb. 1949). Three years later, Briefer revived the series with his original, horrific Frankenstein from #18-33 (March 1952 - Nov. 1954).

=== Later life and career ===
Following the cancellation of Frankenstein during an era that put much pressure on horror comics and other violent comic books, leading to the creation of the Comics Code, Briefer left the comic industry for commercial advertising art.

At the time of his death, Briefer was living in the Hollywood / Pembroke Pines area of Broward County, Florida.

== Reprint collections ==
- Briefer, Dick. The Monster of Frankenstein (Idea Men Productions, 2006) ISBN 1-4196-4017-8, ISBN 978-1-4196-4017-9
- Briefer, Dick. Dick Briefer's Frankenstein (Library of Horror Comics' Masters, IDW/Yoe Books, 2010) ISBN 1-60010-722-2
