= Charles A. Voight =

American cartoonist

- Charles A. Voight in 1923.
- Born: April 28, 1887 New York City, U.S.
- Died: February 10, 1947 (aged 59) New York City, U.S.
- Area: Cartoonist
- Notable works: Betty
- Spouse: Nina Greenleaf Clark (m. 1911; div. 1940)

Charles Anthony Voight (April 28, 1887 – February 10, 1947) was an American cartoonist, best known for his comic strip Betty.

== Early life ==
Born in Brooklyn, New York City, Voight was 14 when he dropped out of school and became an art staffer at the New York World. During this period, he also did advertising art.

== Comic strips ==
In 1908, he drew his first comic strip, Petey Dink, for the Boston Traveler. When it moved to the New York Herald it became simply Petey (sometimes titled Poor Little Petey). He also drew for the New York World, and for Life, he created a series titled The Optimist.

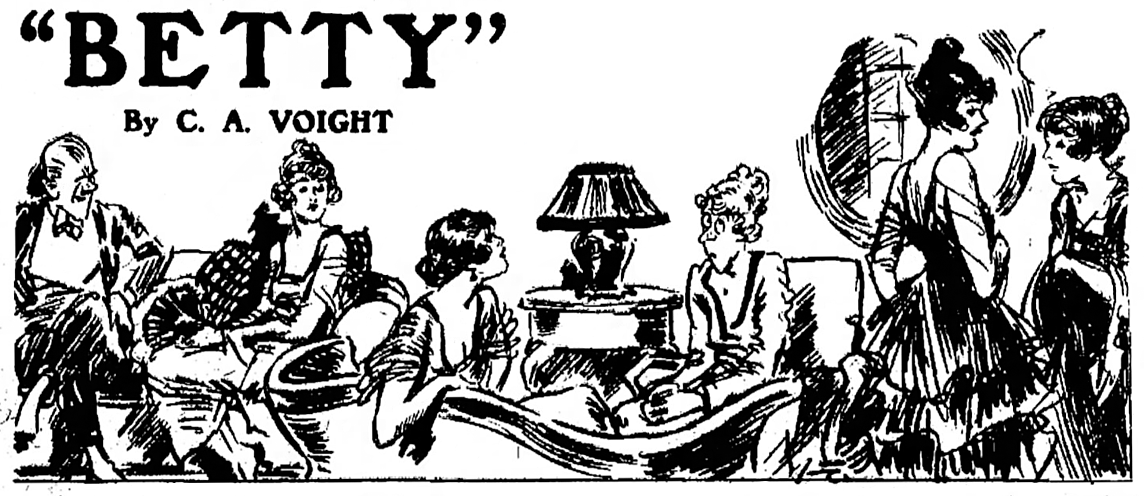
Main character Betty is third from left

His popular glamour girl Sunday strip Betty began in 1919 with the McClure Syndicate, moving to the New York Herald Syndicate with the April 4, 1920, edition. Comics historian Don Markstein described the strip and characters:

Betty Thompson's life was filled with cocktail parties, cotillions and affairs of that nature. She wore all the latest high-class fashions, amply displayed by Voight's lush, stylish and highly individual illustration. While Tillie the Toiler, very much a working girl, may seem to have little in common with Betty, they had one strong point of similarity. Both went through handsome, dashing men by the carload, but through the years stuck with one short, dumpy, seemingly uninteresting guy. Betty's equivalent of Tillie's Mac was Lester DePester, who had little going for him besides loyalty... During the 1930s, heyday of the adventure comic (lesser ones including Dan Dunn and Red Barry), Voight experimented with storylines about crime and sci-fi. But this didn't stop the page from looking like a 1920s period piece. Its datedness may have had something to do with the fact that despite the obvious quality of the work, Betty never moved out into other media, such as movies and radio shows. Or it may have been more attributable to the times, in which stories about rich people didn't speak to the American public.

Betty was an influential strip, notably for the illustrator and comic book artist Bernard Krigstein. Jerry Robinson, in his book The Comics: An Illustrated History of the Comic Strip, commented:

The classic beauty was seen in Betty. Charles Voight employed an exquisite pen style in defining the visual delights of the long-legged, cool sophisticate in the extreme fashion of the day, including beachwear that revealed areas not previously shown in the comic pages.

Voight continued to do artwork for advertising agencies, such as his 1932 Rinso Soap ads.

== Comic books ==
After Betty ended its run in 1943, Voight began drawing for comic books, including He-Man in Tally-Ho Comics (Baily Publishing Company, 1944) and work for Prize Comics (1945). In 1945 he created the superhero Atomic-Man in Headline Comics, and in 1946, drew Impossible Man for Captain Wizard and the superhero satire Captain Milksop for Atomic Bomb Comics #1.

Voight lived for a time in Pelham, New York. When Fontaine Fox first came to visit his friend Voight, he rode the Pelham trolley that inspired him to create the Toonerville Trolley for his long-running cartoon panel, Toonerville Folks.

== Death ==
Voight died on February 10, 1947, in Brooklyn, New York City.
