= Black Owl =

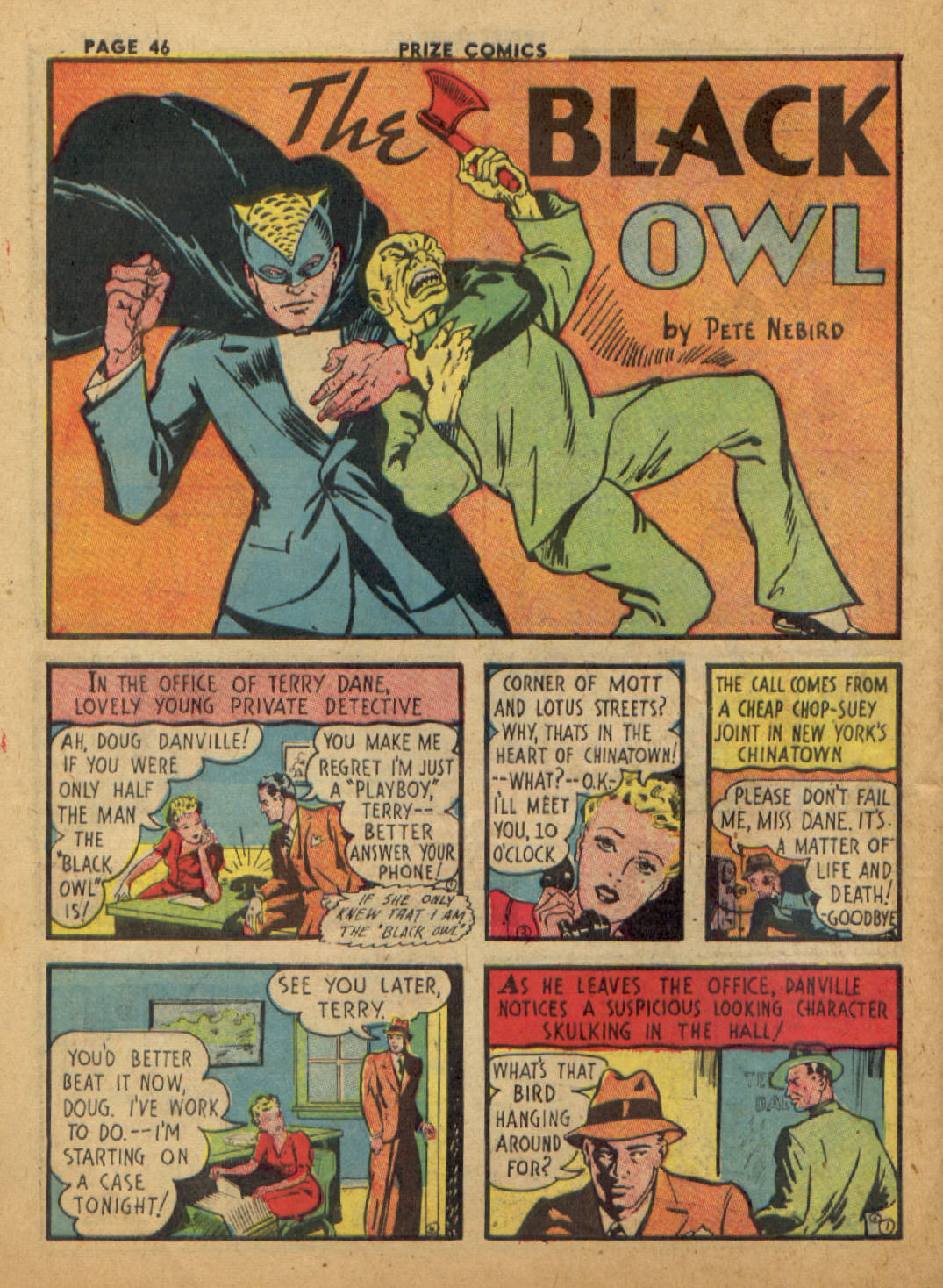
- The Black Owl, 1940

Publication information
- Publisher: Prize Publications
- First appearance: Prize Comics #2 (April 1940)

In-story information
- Alter ego: Doug Danville
- Notable aliases: K the Unknown
- Abilities: None

Black Owl

Publication information
- Publisher: Prize Publications
- First appearance: Prize Comics #34 (Sept. 1943)

In-story information
- Alter ego: Walt Walters
- Partnerships: Yank & Doodle
- Abilities: None

The Black Owl is the name of two superhero characters. Both appeared in the Prize Publications title Prize Comics in the 1940s.

== Publication history ==
In 1940, Prize Publications, which was already established as a producer of pulp magazines, began publishing superhero comic books with a new title, Prize Comics. The first issue featured "K the Unknown", whose name was changed to the Black Owl in issue #2 (April 1940). The lead character, like many in superhero comics at the time, was a bored, wealthy sophisticate who fought crime to pass the time.

In issues #7-9, the Black Owl stories were written and drawn by legends-to-be Joe Simon and Jack Kirby. This was Kirby's first superhero feature.

In issue #24 (Oct. 1942), the Black Owl was part of a large, one-time crossover story called "Utter Failure!!" in which a group of heroes, including Yank & Doodle, Doctor Frost and the Green Lama, fought together against Frankenstein's monster.

In issue #34 (Sept. 1943), the identity of the Black Owl was passed on from Doug Danville to Walt Walters, a character who was already established as the father of Yank & Doodle; the two series were merged. In issue #64 (June 1947), the father was sidelined by means of a bullet, and the focus was almost entirely on Yank & Doodle.

In Superhero Comics of the Golden Age, Mike Benton says that making a connection between these two features was a clever move:

"By making the Black Owl the father of Yank and Doodle, the editors found a logical way to combine their best heroes into one popular feature with intriguing results. For the first year after assuming the mantle of the Black Owl, Walt Walters never told his sons his secret identity. After they learn their father is the Black Owl (Prize Comics, September 1944), the boys and dad are just one happy crime-fighting family — a healthy outlet for any father-son or sibling rivalry".

With issue #69 (April 1948), Prize Comics became Prize Comics Western, and everything that didn't fit the new Western format — including Yank, Doodle, and the Black Owl — was discarded. The three characters have since fallen into the public domain.

In 2008, the online superhero fiction site Metahuman Press debuted the series Living Legends which featured the first Black Owl as part of its cast. The second Black Owl appeared briefly in Fantastic Comics #24, the first issue of the Next Issue Project. In issue #6 of Project Superpowers, the Black Owl and Yank & Doodle were included in a two-page layout of Golden Age character sketches. In the one-shot Project Superpowers: Chapter Two Prelude, it was stated that the three of them would appear in the second volume of this comic title, and that the Black Owl (which one is not yet known) would be transformed into a living black hole.

== Fictional biography ==
=== Doug Danville ===
In 1940, Doug Danville, being a bored and wealthy playboy, decided to add meaning to his seemingly pointless life by fighting the criminal element hand to hand. Originally calling himself "K the Unknown", he quickly changed his identity to that of the Black Owl. His original outfit was a tuxedo and an owl mask, but he soon switched to a blue and red costume.

According to Jess Nevins' Encyclopedia of Golden Age Superheroes, "his Rogues Gallery includes ordinary criminals, Axis agents, the Whistler, the femme fatale Madame Mystery, the murderous Reaper, Chief Skullface (a white man posing as a legendary Native American), the jolly evil prankster the Laughing Head, and the superhumanly strong and clever circus dwarf the Terrible Midge, who hates everything big".

At one point during his career, the Black Owl fought alongside The Green Lama, Yank & Doodle, and several other heroes to defeat Frankenstein's monster.

Finally, after more than three years of crimefighting, Danville decided to do something even more meaningful with his life; he joined the army and fought in World War II. Before leaving, he passed on the costume and identity of the Black Owl to Walt Walters. Whatever became of Danville after the war is not yet known.

=== Walt Walters ===
Walt Walters was already indirectly connected to superheroing; his twin sons, Rick and Dick, were the costumed heroes Yank & Doodle. After Walt took up the mantle of the Black Owl in 1943, he and his sons worked as a team, with Rick and Dick essentially being his sidekicks.

In 1947, Walt suffered a bullet wound and found himself reconsidering being an active superhero; from that point on, he simply served as an adviser to Yank & Doodle.
