= Captain Flag =

Patriotic superhero

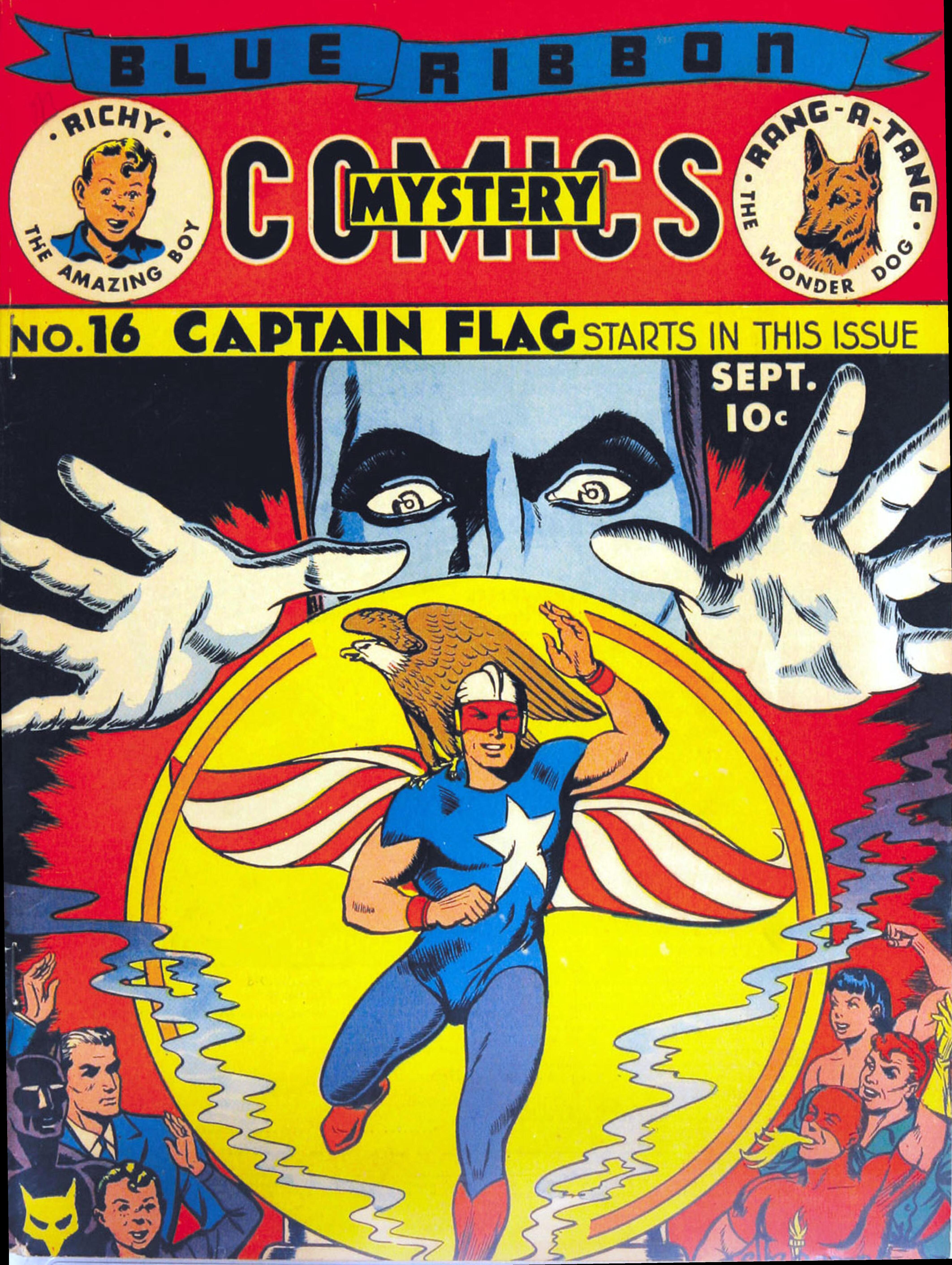
Captain Flag on the cover of Blue Ribbon Comics #16, art by Sam Cooper

Captain Flag is a superhero created by MLJ Comics' writer Joe Blair and artist Lin Streeter. He first appeared in September 1941, in issue #16 of Blue Ribbon Comics. He continued until the last issue, Blue Ribbon Comics #22 (March 1942).

Fall 1941 was a boom period for patriotic superheroes as the country prepared to enter World War II; during this period, comic book publishers also launched Miss Victory, Miss America, the Star-Spangled Kid, U.S. Jones, the Fighting Yank, the Flag and Yank and Doodle, among others. Captain Flag was the "only one" of the various patriotic-themes superheroes to be "trained by an actual bald eagle".

== Publication history ==
Captain Flag debuted in Blue Ribbon Comics #16 (Sept 1941), as a possible headliner for MLJ's superhero stable. In his first story, written by Joe Blair and drawn by Lin Streeter, the character faced off against the Black Hand, a super-criminal working for the Nazis. The character's story in the next issue was drawn by Warren King, and introduced the strip's first supporting character, blonde secret service agent Veronica Darnell. The Black Hand reappeared as a recurring menace several times, including Captain Flag's final 1940s story, in Blue Ribbon Comics #21 (Feb 1942).

The character was revived two decades later, when MLJ (renamed Archie Comics) launched a "camp" superhero line inspired by the popular Batman TV show. In The Mighty Crusaders #4 (April 1966), the company brought back all of their patriotic 1940s heroes in a story called "Too Many Superheroes". Of the 18 superheroes who returned in that story, Captain Flag teamed up with Web and the Fox to form the Ultra-Men in Mighty Crusaders #5.

== Fictional character biography ==
His secret identity is Tom Townsend, the wealthy playboy son of an inventor father. A villain called the Black Hand kidnaps him and his father, intending to torture Tom's father in order to obtain the secret of his latest invention – a new bomb sight. Tom's father dies resisting the questioning but before Tom, too, can be killed, a great eagle crashes through the window and carries him off.

Training with the eagle's aerie at the top of the mountain, the healthy environment and hard living makes him an elite physical specimen. When the eagle brings a US flag, Tom takes it on as his namesake, and makes a costume out of the flag. He names his animal savior-turned-sidekick Yank the Eagle, and goes on to thwart the Black Hand, hanging him from a ship's yardarm.
