= Human Top =

Human Top may refer to three Marvel Comics characters who have used the name:

- Human Top (Bruce Bravelle), Bruce Bravelle, who first appeared in Red Raven Comics #1 (1940)
- Human Top (David Mitchell), David Mitchell, who first appeared in The Invaders vol. 1, #27 (1978)
- Human Top (Davey Cannon), Davey Cannon, a supervillain, introduced in the 1960s, who is better known as Whirlwind
