= Miss America (DC Comics) =

Fictional character

- Art by Daniel Acuña.

Publication information
- Publisher: DC Comics; Quality Comics
- First appearance: Military Comics #1 (August 1941)
- Created by: Elmer Wexler

In-story information
- Alter ego: Joan Dale Trevor
- Species: Metahuman
- Team affiliations: Freedom Fighters; Justice Society of America; All-Star Squadron
- Abilities: Post-Crisis: Molecular transmutation; Flight; Immortality; Pre-Crisis: Superhuman strength, durability, and speed; Psychokinesis; Teleportation; Extended longevity

Miss America is a superheroine from the DC Comics Universe. She was first created by Quality Comics in Military Comics #1 (August 1941), and was carried over to DC Comics when they purchased Quality in the 1950s. While the original Golden Age character is in public domain, the subsequent versions created by DC Comics are not.

Fall 1941 was a boom period for patriotic superheroes as the country prepared to enter World War II; during this period, comic book publishers also launched Miss Victory, the Star-Spangled Kid, U.S. Jones, the Fighting Yank, the Flag, Captain Flag and Yank and Doodle, among others.

== Fictional character biography ==
=== Pre-Crisis history ===
Miss America is originally Joan Dale, a courageous reporter who had a dream in which the Statue of Liberty appeared to her and, giving her the power to transmute elements, instructed her to battle evil. Joan awakes to find that she now has these powers. Adopting a patriotically-themed costume, she begins fighting evil as Miss America.

She had a brief run in Military Comics #1-7, then faded into obscurity to a degree that Timely Comics (later Marvel Comics) soon felt free to create an unrelated character with the same name.

Initially, Miss America did not have a superhero costume, largely using her powers surreptitiously. In later stories she wears a costume consisting of a sleeveless red blouse, a red-and-white striped skirt, and a blue cape fastened with a silver star. This costume continually changes in appearance, possibly because she uses her powers to create it. Following her initial run, later appearances of the character add a red domino mask.

In the 1980s, writer Roy Thomas revived the character. She is briefly referenced in the first appearance of the Freedom Fighters in the pages of All-Star Squadron, when she is said to have been a member of that group who was thought to have had been killed when Uncle Sam attempted to prevent the attack on Pearl Harbor from occurring on Earth-X.

=== Post-Crisis history ===
In post-Crisis on Infinite Earths continuity, Miss America gained superpowers after being abducted and experimented on by the secret government agency Project M. They believed the experiment to be a failure and had returned her to whence she had been taken, leaving her none the wiser.

Miss America in Secret Origins #26.

Later that year, the Japanese plot their attack on Pearl Harbor. Uncle Sam learns of the attack and assembles the Freedom Fighters to prevent it. The mission is doomed and all but Uncle Sam are seemingly killed in the fight. Sam later discovers that three of his allies had survived, Miss America among them. After the mission, she is reclaimed by Project M.

When Robotman and the Young All-Stars visit Project M, they discover that Miss America is indeed alive, albeit comatose. A battle with the Ultra-Humanite breaks out, which awakens Joan from her coma. She promptly returns to the defense of her country and in late May 1942, she joins the Justice Society of America as the group's secretary.

==== Retirement ====
Eventually, Joan Dale's powers fade and she retires as Miss America. She marries Admiral Derek Trevor, and eventually they become the adoptive parents of Hippolyta "Lyta" Trevor Hall, who becomes the modern-day Fury in Infinity, Inc.

Lyta becomes pregnant with the child of her teammate and lover, Hector Hall, but the latter later dies. She moves back home with her adoptive parents, Joan and Derek Trevor, and is soon reunited with Hector, who has become the new Sandman. Learning that Hector can only exist for one hour outside the Dream Dimension, Lyta and Hector marry and Lyta joins Hector in the Dream Dimension.

==== One Year Later ====
A much older Joan Dale returns in the fifth issue of Uncle Sam and the Freedom Fighters (January 2007) to confront a youthful imposter bearing the mantle who has, under the orders of Father Time, managed to neutralize and capture the new team of Freedom Fighters.

In issue #6, Joan reveals that she never lost her powers, but used them to create the illusion that she had aged in order to retire and live a normal life with her husband. Now that Derek Trevor has died, she lets the illusion slip and resumes her youthful, heroic guise to aid Uncle Sam and his new team. While fighting the impostor Miss America, Joan discovers that the impostor is a gynoid and destroys her.

==== Miss Cosmos ====
In the 2007 Uncle Sam and the Freedom Fighters series, Red Bee mutates into an insect-like creature and mind-controls Joan into absorbing Human Bomb's energy and taking it into space. Joan then explodes, presumed to be dead. Unbeknownst to her allies, Joan manages to keep her consciousness alive, rebuilding a new, young body from extant space materials. Evolved into a new form of life, she discards her Miss America identity and becomes Miss Cosmos.

=== The New 52 ===
In 2011, "The New 52" rebooted the DC universe. Joan Dale makes her debut in Human Bomb #1. Depicted as a telepath, she helps Michael Taylor to control his powers and gather information about the criminal organization C.R.O.W.N.

=== The New Golden Age ===
"The New Golden Age" storyline retroactively reveals that Miss America had two sidekicks, Betsy Ross and Molly Pitcher, until they mysteriously disappeared.

== Powers and abilities ==
Miss America has the powers of transmutation on a molecular level. Her own inexperience with the physical sciences initially curtailed her use of the powers early in her career, usually using it for simple changes that were not permanent. There appeared to be an upper limit to the size of matter, and the duration of its transmutation, but this was never made specific.

Following her return, Miss America appears to have become much more proficient with her powers, claiming that she would be able to transform an enemy's organs to glass or shrink them to microscopic size. Joan grew so proficient in the use of her abilities that she could change her own age at will, from an elderly woman of considerable age to a younger one in her physical prime.

The impostor version who appears in Uncle Sam and the Freedom Fighters #5-6 could fire energy blasts and possessed the ability to psionically neutralize the Freedom Fighters' powers. Both boasted flight powers and increased physicality but it was never clarified if these were separate aspects of it or not.

Her powers grew so strong that her disembodied consciousness reconstructed a new physical body out of Star Stuff from the universe after dying from absorbing an explosive detonation. This bestowed her with cosmic powers, enough to tear through alien warships, which seem to have faded with time. It also hinted at a form of regeneration and immortality through her total conversion abilities.

== Other versions ==
=== Princess Diana ===
In Wonder Woman (vol. 2) #184-185, Wonder Woman is transported back in time to 1943. To avoid significantly altering the timeline, she assumes the identity of Miss America as a disguise.

=== Elseworlds ===
An alternate universe version of Miss America appears in The Golden Age. This version is the girlfriend of Tex Thompson, also known as Mr. America. Disturbed by the increasingly moody and abusive actions of her lover, Joan steals Thompson's journal and learns that Thompson is really the villain Ultra-Humanite. Before she can publicly expose Ultra-Humanite, Miss America is murdered by Robotman.
