= Miss Victory =

American comic book superheroine

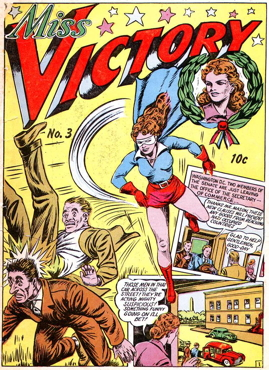
- Miss Victory on the cover of Holyoke One-Shot #3 (1944).

Publication information
- Publisher: Originally: Helnit; 1984–present: A.C. Comics
- First appearance: Captain Fearless #1 (August 1941)
- Created by: artist Charles Quinlan and an unknown writer

In-story information
- Alter ego: Joan Wayne
- Species: Empowered human
- Place of origin: Earth
- Team affiliations: Femforce
- Notable aliases: Ms. Victory; Rad
- Abilities: Superhuman strength; Limited invulnerability; Flight; Agelessness

Miss Victory is an American superheroine who first appeared in Captain Fearless #1 (Aug. 1941), published by Frank Z. Temerson's Helnit Publishing Co. Ceasing to be published after 1946, she was revived and updated in 1984 as a central character in the Femforce comic-book series published by A.C. Comics.

Fall 1941 was a boom period for patriotic superheroes as the country prepared to enter World War II; during this period, comic book publishers also launched Wonder Woman, Captain America, Miss America, the Star-Spangled Kid, U.S. Jones, the Fighting Yank, the Flag, Captain Flag and Yank and Doodle, among others.

== Publication history ==
Introduced during the period fans and historians term the Golden Age of Comic Books, the original Miss Victory was created in Captain Fearless #1 (Aug. 1941) in an untitled, five-page story generally indexed with its opening words, "Introducing Miss Victory", probably written by Alberta Tews and drawn by Charles Quinlan. She went on to appear in the second and final issue of Captain Fearless. Contrary to some sources, she did not appear in Helnit's first issue of Captain Aero, but after Holyoke Publishing took over the series from Helnit her second story was reprinted in vol. 1 #12 (#6 on cover) and in new stories beginning with the following issue, vol 2 #1 (#7 on cover).

Given no formal origin story, it was left unexplained as to how Miss Victory was able to survive explosions, break free of ropes, or knock down walls, but is clear that in her introduction she had superhuman strength and durability.

According to Jess Nevins' Encyclopedia of Golden Age Superheroes, "her opponents range from ordinary criminals to Germans to pretend talking apes to Japanese Yellow Peril femmes fatale".

She remained as star of a backup feature in the sporadically published Captain Aero Comics as the title returned to Temerson's control in 1943. In 1944, the strip was drawn by Nina Albright, who redesigned her costume in issue #14 (April 1944) to increase the character's sex appeal, trading in the blouse for a halter top.

The character last appeared in Captain Aero Comics' final issue, #26 (Aug. 1946).

In 1984, the character was revived by writer Bill Black and penciler Mark Heike in AC Comics' Femforce Special #1 (Fall 1984).

== Fictional character biography ==
Miss Victory was secretly stenographer Joan Wayne, whose work in a Government department, coupled with her desire to help the war effort, led her to don the patriotic guise of Miss Victory: a tight-fitting, red-white-and-blue costume with a plunging neckline and a V emblem across her chest.

The 1984-revival version also possesses superhuman strength, as well as the ability to fly over short distances. Her true identity is Dr. Joan Wayne, a research scientist in the United States Department of Defense, who in the 1940s developed the "V-47 formula" to increase the strength/stamina of allied troops. The formula, however, only worked on Joan herself, and she became a superheroine. The formula also prevented her from aging, so that the Miss Victory of today is still a young, attractive woman.

Miss Victory received an overdose of the related but faulty V-45 formula from the Black Commando which affected her personality, transforming her into the villainous Rad. Eventually, the V-45 formula was removed from her system and she returned to Femforce. In the mid 1990s, Wayne temporarily resigned her leadership of Femforce, and was replaced by her grown daughter Jennifer, the only other person on whom the V-47 formula would work. Jennifer was referred to as the second Miss Victory. After Joan returned to the Miss Victory role, Jennifer eventually took V-45 and became the second Rad. Jennifer (as Rad) is not really a villain, but more of an anti-hero. In addition to her daughter, Miss Victory's family consists of husband, fellow hero Captain Paragon and a cloned son of the couple created by an enemy.

A new ORIGIN OF MISS VICTORY was released in 2024. Miss Victory's first suit was discovered in a locked trunk at a thrift store in 2019 in which her origin was revealed via a document that fell from a concealed pocked within the suit.
