= Leonard Starr =

American cartoonist (1925–2015)

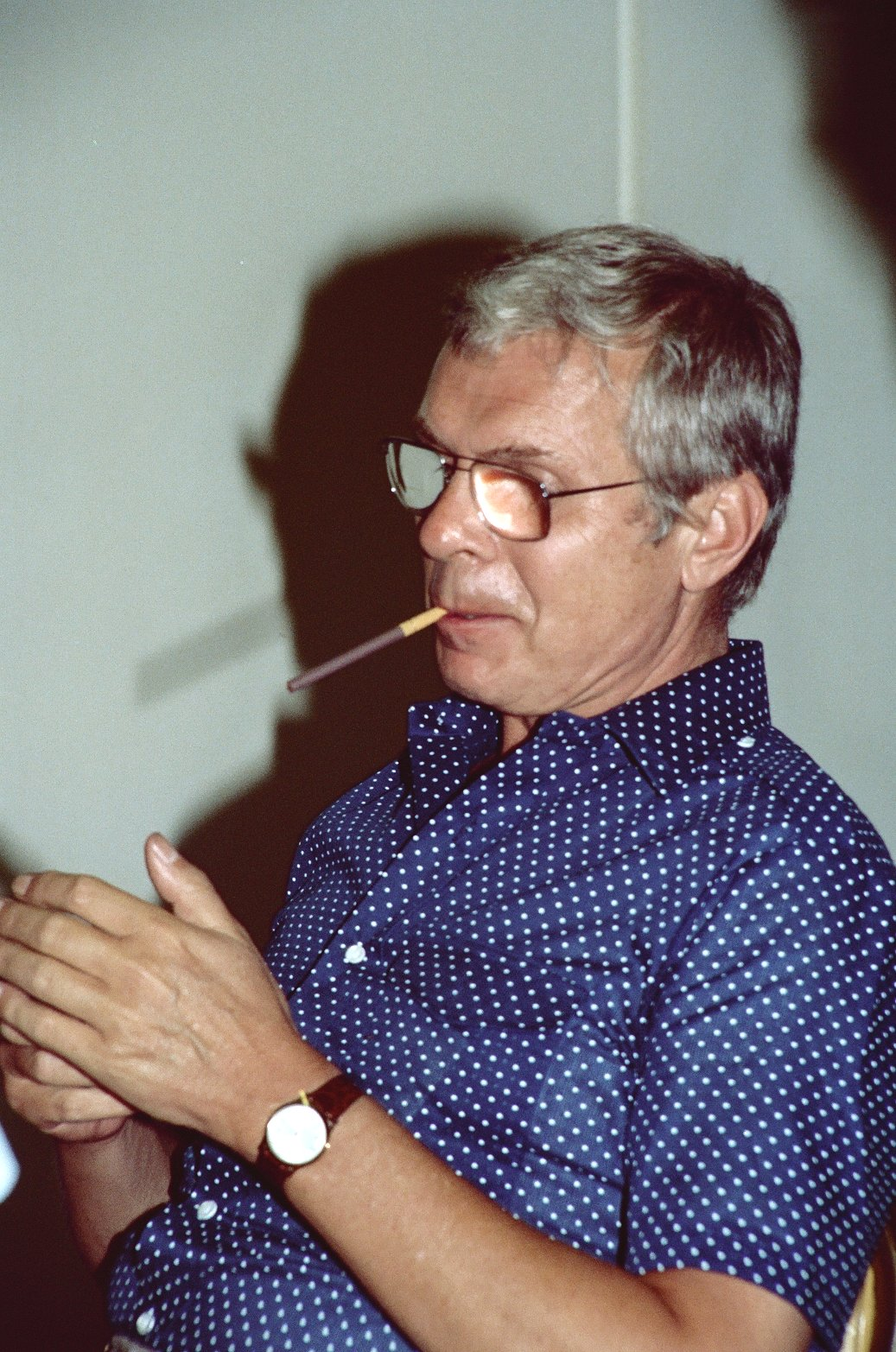
- Starr in 1982
- Born: October 28, 1925 New York City, U.S.
- Died: June 30, 2015 (aged 89)
- Areas: Writer, editor, publisher, producer
- Notable works: On Stage; Little Orphan Annie

Leonard Starr (October 28, 1925 – June 30, 2015) was an American cartoonist, comic book artist, and advertising artist, best known for creating the newspaper comic strip On Stage and reviving Little Orphan Annie.

== Early life ==
Born in 1925 in New York City, Starr graduated from Manhattan's High School of Music and Art and then studied at Pratt Institute.

== Career ==
While attending Pratt during between 1942 and 1943, Starr worked for the Harry "A" Chesler and the Funnies, Inc. studios, contributing to the early comic-book features produced at these studios. For Funnies, he began as a background artist, eventually inking Bob Oksner's pencils. He graduated to drawing for early Timely/Marvel Comics titles, including the Human Torch and the Sub-Mariner.

Throughout the 1940s, Starr worked for a plethora of publishers of both comic books and pulps, including Better Publications, Consolidated Book, Croyden Publications, E. R. Ross Publishing, Fawcett Comics (doing Don Winslow of the Navy, 1944–46), Hillman Periodicals and M. C. Combs. He worked with Joe Simon and Jack Kirby on their earlier romance comics titles, in particular the Crestwood/Prize title Young Romance.

In the late 1940s, he drew for EC Comics, including War Against Crime, before working both as an advertising artist and producing a large amount of work for both the American Comics Group (ACG) and DC Comics titles during the early to mid-1950s. His DC work spanned a large number of covers, and work on titles as diverse as Doctor 13, House of Mystery, Gang Busters, Pow-Wow Smith, Indian Lawman and Star-Spangled War Stories, mainly prior to 1957. For ACG, he worked on Adventures into the Unknown, Operation Peril and Soldiers of Fortune among other titles. Between 1955 and 1956, he moved from comic books to comic strips with uncredited work on King Features' Flash Gordon.

Leonard Starr's Mary Perkins, On Stage (November 7, 1974)

== Mary Perkins, On Stage ==
In 1957, Starr created the comic strip On Stage, later titled Mary Perkins, On Stage, for the Chicago-Tribune-New York News Syndicate. Characterized by a mix of soap opera, adventure and humor, the strip featured tight, realistic graphics and, from the beginning, strong layouts, design and storytelling. He received the National Cartoonists Society's Story Comic Strip Award for On Stage in 1960 and 1963, and their Reuben Award in 1965. He continued producing Mary Perkins, On Stage until 1979. Starr later cited the work of Alex Raymond and Milton Caniff as influences on the strip's artwork.

== Other work ==
Starr returned to comic books briefly during the 1970s and 1980s, working on "Morbius, the Living Vampire" for Marvel in 1975 and providing art for DC's Who's Who in the DC Universe (1986) and for a Superman and Lois Lane story in Action Comics. For Dargaud in Paris, he created Kelly Green with Stan Drake in 1980. This series of graphic novels about the sexy and capable female action heroine Kelly Green, were illustrated by Drake. In 1985, he wrote and illustrated an action/adventure graphic novel published only in France Operation Psy featuring Cannonball Carmody. That same year, he was enlisted by artist Frank Bolle to take over writing the strip Winnie Winkle (without credit) which he did until its end in 1996. He also ghost wrote Rip Kirby as a favor to his friend, artist John Prentice, in the strip's final years.

Starr expanded into animation in the 1980s, as he noted, "Started writing television scripts in the early 1970s, and in 1984 I was asked to develop and write the bible for the Rankin Bass animated television show ThunderCats, and also act as the story editor and head writer. Moved to Westport, Connecticut, in 1970 where I still live today." Starr wrote 23 episodes for ThunderCats. He also worked on the Rankin Bass series Ghost Warrior (1985).

In the 1980s, Starr attended as a guest several comic conventions held in New York. Also, he was a guest at the 1982 San Diego Comic-Con, at which he received an Inkpot Award.

== Little Orphan Annie ==
Leonard Starr's Little Orphan Annie

In 1979 he revived the comic strip Little Orphan Annie. The strip had been in reprints since 1974 after a string of unsuccessful artists had succeeded the famous creator Harold Gray, who had died in 1968. Retitled Annie, Starr's incarnation of the strip received the National Cartoonists Society's Story Comic Strip Award in 1983 and 1984. Starr continued it successfully until his retirement in 2000.

== Later life ==
Beginning in 2006, Starr produced new artwork for the covers to the ongoing series of On Stage reprint volumes published by Classic Comics Press. To publicize the reprints he was a guest at the 2008 New York Comic Con and 2009 San Diego Comic-Con. He died in 2015, aged 89.

== Screenwriting ==
=== Television ===
- Festival of Family Classics (1972)
- ThunderCats (1985–1987): seasons 1–2 head writer
- SilverHawks (1986)
- The Comic Strip (1987)

=== Film ===
- The Red Baron (1972)
