= Mary Perkins, On Stage =

American comic strip by Leonard Starr

- Leonard Starr's On Stage (November 17, 1957)
- Author: Leonard Starr
- Current status/schedule: Concluded daily strip
- Launch date: February 1957
- End date: September 9, 1979
- Alternate name(s): On Stage; Mary Perkins
- Syndicate: Chicago Tribune-New York News Syndicate
- Publisher: Classic Comics Press
- Genre(s): Soap opera, action-adventure, humor

Mary Perkins, On Stage (originally titled simply On Stage) is an American newspaper comic strip by Leonard Starr for the Chicago Tribune-New York News Syndicate. It ran from February 10, 1957, to September 9, 1979, with the switch to the longer title in 1961. Some papers carried the strip under the shortened title Mary Perkins.

The strip came to a conclusion when Starr left in 1979 to take over Little Orphan Annie.

== Origins ==
Having previously worked on comic books, Starr decided to try to publish a newspaper comic strip. Starr submitted his concepts to Moe Riley, a vice president at the Chicago Tribune Syndicate. Riley chose two of Starr's ideas: one about a missionary who worked in foreign countries and the other about a young woman who comes to New York to become an actress. The syndicate chose the second idea, and Starr was hired to produce On Stage.

== Characters and story ==
Starr's scripts mixed soap opera, adventure and broad humor, while the art was characterized by a studied line and often innovative storytelling. The strip offered a Broadway backstage drama as it followed the career of actress Mary Perkins in New York, Hollywood and on various international film sets and locations. A host of supporting characters joined Mary, including (in early September 1957) her photographer beau, Pete Fletcher. The two married on December 13, 1959.

The first On Stage Sunday strip was launched February 10, 1957. That is generally considered the start date for the strip, but in 1970, comics historian Raymond Miller wrote that internal evidence in the first Sunday page suggested the strip had at least a week's worth of prior daily strips.

== Awards ==
On Stage comic book published by Dell

Starr won the National Cartoonists Society Story Comic Strip Award for the series in 1960 and 1963, and its Reuben Award in 1965.

== Reception ==
Discussing On Stage, comics historian Bob Bindig wrote that "the artwork is excellent...Starr likes to draw and it shows in his work. Each panel is a well developed planned illustration." Writer Dennis Wepman stated "On Stage transcended the conventions of the sentimental romance and tearjerker, incorporating elements of high comedy and often gripping adventure and suspense."

== Reprints ==
Classic Comics Press announced in February 2006 that it had an agreement with Tribune Media Services to release chronological collected volumes of On Stage. The first appeared in June 2006, reprinting the strips of February 10, 1957 to January 11, 1958. The second volume was released later in 2006, the third in 2007 and the fourth in 2008. By 2016, the entire run of the strip had been reprinted in fifteen volumes.
