= Major Victory =

Major Victory, in comics, may refer to:

- Major Victory (DC Comics), three DC Comics characters:
  - William Vickers, the original Major Victory and leader of defunct 1980s superhero team Force of July
  - A second Major Victory, who appeared in Metropolis and the Superman titles in 2003
  - Major Victory, agent of S.H.A.D.E. and member of Force of July-remake Freedom's Ring
- Major Victory (Marvel Comics), a name used by Marvel Comics character Vance Astro of the Guardians of the Galaxy
  - Major Victory, a character mentioned in Invaders (1975–1979) as being an actively Marvel-published comic book during the early and mid 20th Century
- Major Victory, a Golden Age superhero published by Harry "A" Chesler Comics
- Major Victory, the superhero identity of Chris Watters, a character from the first season of Stan Lee's television show Who Wants to Be a Superhero?
