= Fighting American =

1954-1955 superhero comic book

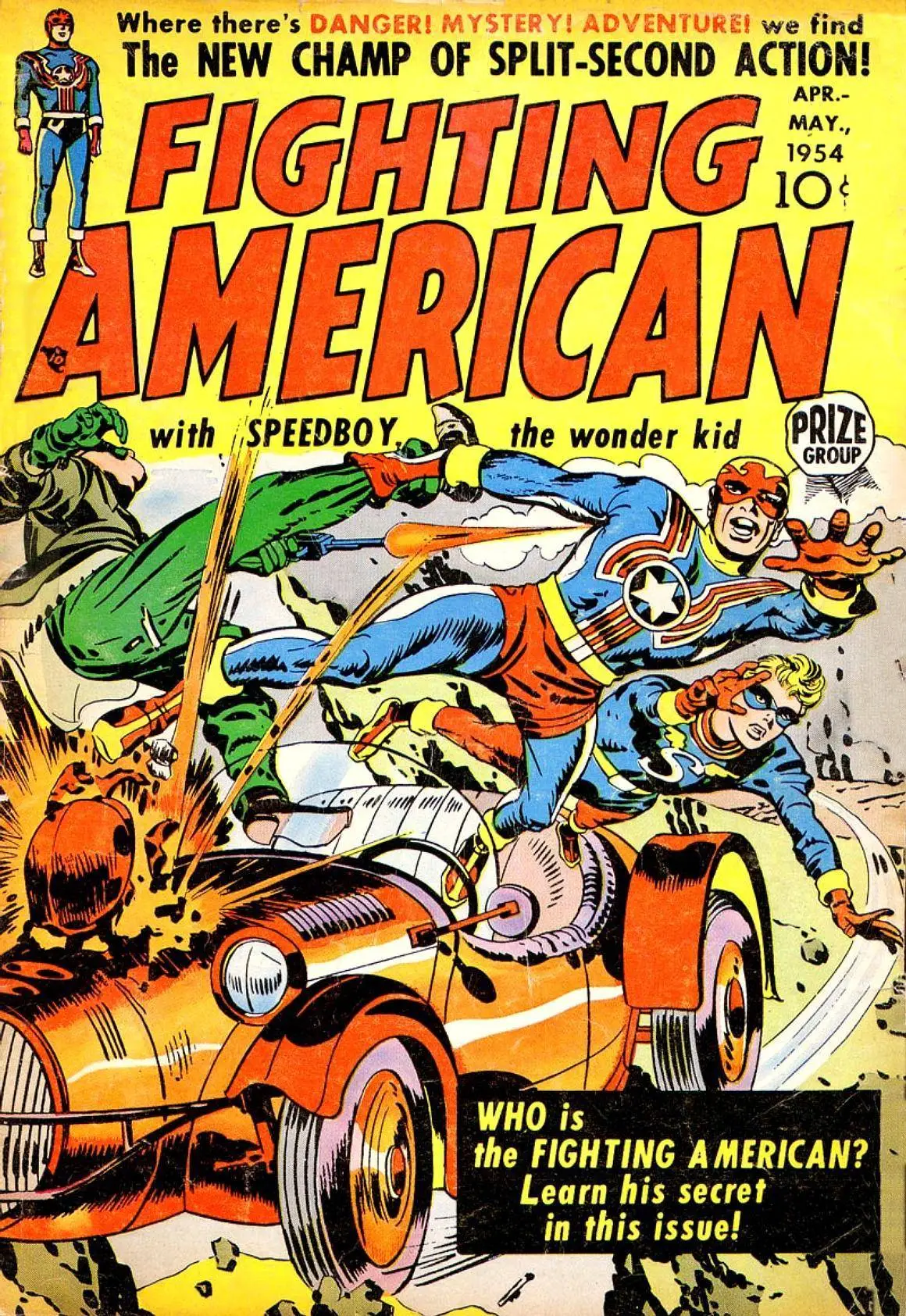
- Fighting American #1 (cover dated April-May 1954), depicting the title character and his sidekick Speedboy, art by Jack Kirby

Publication information
- Publisher: Prize Group, Harvey Comics, Marvel Comics, DC Comics, Awesome Entertainment
- First appearance: Fighting American #1 (May 1954)
- Created by: Joe Simon (writer, artist); Jack Kirby (artist)

In-story information
- Alter ego: Nelson Flagg; John Flagg
- Partnerships: Speedboy
- Abilities: Artificially enhanced strength, speed, endurance, and agility Master hand-to-hand combatant Longevity

Fighting American is a superhero created in 1954 by the writer-artist team of Joe Simon and Jack Kirby. Published by the Crestwood Publications imprint Prize Comics, it was, contrary to standard industry practices of the time, creator-owned. Harvey Comics published one additional issue in 1966. One final inventoried tale was published in 1989, in a Marvel Comics hardcover collection of all the Fighting American stories.

Subsequent publishers have had short runs of Fighting American stories with the permission of the owners' estates. The character gained some notoriety due to a lawsuit in the late 1990s when Awesome Entertainment founder Rob Liefeld announced intentions to publish a mini-series that was allegedly similar to that artist's run on Marvel's Captain America title. After settling the dispute, Awesome released three Fighting American series.

== Publication history ==
Bitter that Timely Comics' 1950s iteration, Atlas Comics, had relaunched their superhero Captain America in a new series in 1954, the writer-artist team of Joe Simon and Jack Kirby created another patriotically themed character, Fighting American. Simon recalled, "We thought we'd show them how to do Captain America". While the comic book initially portrayed the protagonist as an anti-Communist dramatic hero, Simon and Kirby turned the series into a superhero satire with the second issue, in the aftermath of the Army–McCarthy hearings and the public backlash against the Red-baiting U.S. Senator Joseph McCarthy. Simon specified for a panel audience at the 1974 Comic Art Convention in New York that the character was not so much inspired by Captain America as it was simply a product of the times.

Simon said in 1989 that he felt the anti-Communist fervor of the era would provide antagonists who, like the Nazis who fought Captain America during World War II, would be "colorful, outrageous and perfect foils for our hero":

The first stories were deadly serious. Fighting American was the first [C]ommie-basher in comics. We were all caught up in Senator McCarthy's vendetta against the 'red menace.' But soon it became evident that McCarthy ... had gone too far, damaging innocent Americans. ... Then, the turnaround, [as] his side became talked of as the lunatic fringe .... Jack and I quickly became uncomfortable with Fighting American's cold war. Instead, we relaxed and had fun with the characters.

Published bimonthly by Prize Group, an imprint of Crestwood Publications, Fighting American lasted through issue #7 (May 1955). The following decade, for Harvey Comics, Simon packaged a single issue of Fighting American (October 1966) consisting of "reprints and unpublished material" from the 1950s run, with some changes made to comply with the since-instituted Comics Code. A final inventoried Fighting American story, the three-page "The Beef Box", not drawn by Kirby, appeared in Marvel Comics' 1989 hardcover collection of the 1950s and 1960s stories.

The character was revived by Titan Comics in a new series starting in October 2017.

== Fictional character biography ==
In the 10-page story "First Assignment: Break the Spy Ring" in Fighting American #1 (May 1954), Nelson Flagg was the unathletic younger brother of star athlete and war hero Johnny Flagg, and served as the writer for popular TV news commentator Johnny at station USA. When outspoken anti-Communist Johnny is killed by one of the many enemies his commentary has earned him, Nelson makes a deathbed promise to hunt down his brother's murderers. Recruited for the U.S. military's "Project Fighting American", Nelson has his mind and life force transferred to Johnny's "revitalized and strengthened" corpse. Assuming Johnny's identity, he adopts the costumed alter ego Fighting American to battle Communist threats. In the premiere issue's second story, the six-page "Second Assignment: Track Down the Baby Buzz Bombs", an unnamed, blond-haired teenager working as a page at Flagg's network assists the hero and is rewarded with own costume and the name Speedboy.

The two went on to battle an array of mostly Communists with physical deformities and colorful names, such as the two-headed criminal Doubleheader, the redheaded battle-axe weilder Rhode Island Red, the Russian dwarf Sawdoff, Super-Khakhalovitch, the bouncing bank robber Round Robin, and Invisible Irving, the Great Nothing.

== Powers and abilities ==
Though not specified, Fighting American's powers are shown to be increased strength, agility, endurance, and speed. His aging was also slowed to the point where a fellow WWII vet notes he hasn't "aged a day".

== Alternate versions ==
=== DC Comics ===
In a six-issue miniseries (February–July 1994), published by DC Comics and written by Dave Rawson and Pat McGreal, with art by Greg LaRocque, the character was a former TV host bent on avenging his brother's death.

=== Awesome Entertainment ===
A two-issue miniseries (August–October 1997) from Awesome Entertainment, written by Rob Liefeld (story) and Jeph Loeb (script), penciled by Liefeld and Stephen Platt. Here, Fighting American was a retired superhero coping with the death of his partner. The miniseries came about, Liefeld said in 2007, while he was packaging a Captain America series for Marvel. In early 1997, the company, which had filed for bankruptcy, asked Liefeld to accept lower payment for his studio's work. He refused and was removed from the series. Liefeld called Fighting American co-creator Joe Simon and Roz Kirby, widow of co-creator Jack Kirby, who agreed to license the character to him, but at a price Liefeld would not accept. Liefeld created the similar character Agent America, drawing "maybe three pinups and one poster image", but withdrew the character, he said, when Simon threatened to sue. Liefeld negotiated a new deal for Fighting American, but was then sued by Marvel. During the course of the trial, he said, his version of Fighting American acquired a shield. As one of the terms of the settlement, however, Fighting American was forbidden from throwing his shield like a weapon, to distinguish him from Captain America.

In later comics published by Awesome Entertainment, Fighting American was John Flagg, a former soldier who gained powers through an unspecified experiment "never to be duplicated" (namely, the periodic transference of his brother Nelson's mind into John's body for crime-fighting purposes). A subsequent miniseries, Rules of the Game, written by Loeb with art by Ed McGuinness, reintroduced some of the original Simon & Kirby villains. It was followed by the miniseries Dogs of War, written by Jim Starlin and penciled by Platt. While Awesome was legally prohibited from having him throw the shield, Rules and Dogs showed several additional weapons are built into it, including multiple spike projectiles, a Gatling gun and a mini-missile. This version has also used throwing stars tipped with tranquilizers.

In this iteration, Fighting American was given a new sidekick to replace Speedboy, code-named S.P.I.C.E. which stood for Super Prototype Intelligent Cyborg Entity. Described as a weapon of mass destruction in the form of a sixteen-year-old girl, she had extendable titanium limbs, laser-blasters built into her fingers, and a gung-ho attitude.

=== Dynamite Entertainment ===
In 2009, Dynamite Entertainment's Nick Barrucci revealed that his company would publish the character with creative contributions from artist Alex Ross, although character co-creator Joe Simon contended he never gave his approval: "There are some penciled covers of Fighting American by Mr. Ross that are printed in the story without copyright notice. I find that damaging, as is the whole fake story". Kirby-estate attorney Paul S. Levine countered that Simon's attorney, Tedd Kessler, had been informed and approving of Fighting American negotiations involving Barrucci "from the very beginning", including the drafting of contracts among Dynamite, the Kirby estate, and Simon, which were unsigned at the time of Barrucci's announcement. Following this disagreement between Simon and Barrucci, the Kirby estate withdrew its own participation.

=== Titan Comics ===
In 2017, Titan Comics brought back Fighting American and Speedboy for a new monthly book. The first four issues were written by Gordon Rennie, drawn by Duke Mighten and PC De La Fuente, inked by Jed Dougherty, coloured by Tracy Bailey and edited by David Leach. The plot, taken from an outline written by David Leach, saw Fighting American and his sidekick Speedboy arriving through a time warp in the present day New York and getting marooned in the present, whilst on the trail of a gang of his worst enemies brought through time by the mysterious Madame Chaos. This was followed up by a second four-issue mini series called The Ties That Bind, written again by Gordon Rennie and drawn by Andie Tong, with colouring by Tracy Bailey.
