= Yank & Doodle =

Publication information
- Publisher: Crestwood Publications
- First appearance: Prize Comics #13 (Aug. 1941)
- Created by: Paul Norris

In-story information
- Alter ego: Rick Walters and Dick Walters
- Partnerships: The Black Owl
- Abilities: When together, super-strength and invulnerability; when apart, none.

Yank & Doodle is a pair of superheroes who first appeared in the Prize Publications title Prize Comics in August 1941. They were revived by Dynamite Entertainment in the 2000s.

Identical twins Rick and Dick Walters, being too young to enlist in the army during World War II, fight spies and saboteurs in the United States as the costumed heroes Yank (Rick) and Doodle (Dick). When near each other, the duo possess super-strength and invulnerability, but they have no superpowers when apart.

== Publication history ==
Fall 1941 was a boom period for patriotic superheroes as the country prepared to enter World War II; during this period, comic book publishers also launched Miss Victory, Miss America, the Star-Spangled Kid, U.S. Jones, Fighting Yank, the Flag and Captain Flag, among others.

Created by an unremembered writer and artist Paul Norris, Yank & Doodle first appeared in Prize Comics #13 (cover-dated Aug. 1941) as two superheroes who were too young to enlist in the army, but were still able to make a difference in the war effort. Their costumes were identical, except that Yank's had a letter Y on the front, and Doodle's a letter D. Their names were derived from the patriotic song Yankee Doodle. A recurring enemy was the Limping Man.

In issue #24 (Oct. 1942), the duo took part in a crossover of all the Prize Comics heroes, including the Black Owl.

Prize Comics shrank by eight pages starting with issue #34 (Sept. 1943), so the Yank and Doodle strip was merged with the Black Owl. The Owl turned out to be the kids' father Walt, and they began adventuring together. When dad was sidelined in issue #64 (June 1947), the boys once again had the spotlight to themselves.

With issue #69 (April, 1948), Prize Comics became Prize Comics Western, and everything that didn't fit the new Western format — including The Black Owl and Yank & Doodle — was discarded. The three characters have since fallen into the public domain.

In issue #6 of Project Superpowers, The Black Owl and Yank & Doodle were included in a two-page layout of Golden Age character sketches; in the one-shot Project Superpowers: Chapter Two Prelude, it was stated that the three of them would appear in the second volume of this comic title, and that Yank & Doodle would be part of a team of kid sidekicks and young superheroes.

== Fictional biography ==
At one point during their career, they teamed up with the Green Lama, the first Black Owl, and many other heroes to fight Frankenstein's monster.

Later, their father Walt became the second Black Owl, having been made the successor of the first one; for the next three years, father and sons worked together as a team, with Yank & Doodle basically being the Owl's sidekicks. When a bullet wound convinced Walt to retire from active crime-fighting, he became an adviser to the boys, who were once again fighting as a duo.
