= Headline Comics (For The American Boy) =

1943 American comic book series

Headline Comics (for The American Boy)
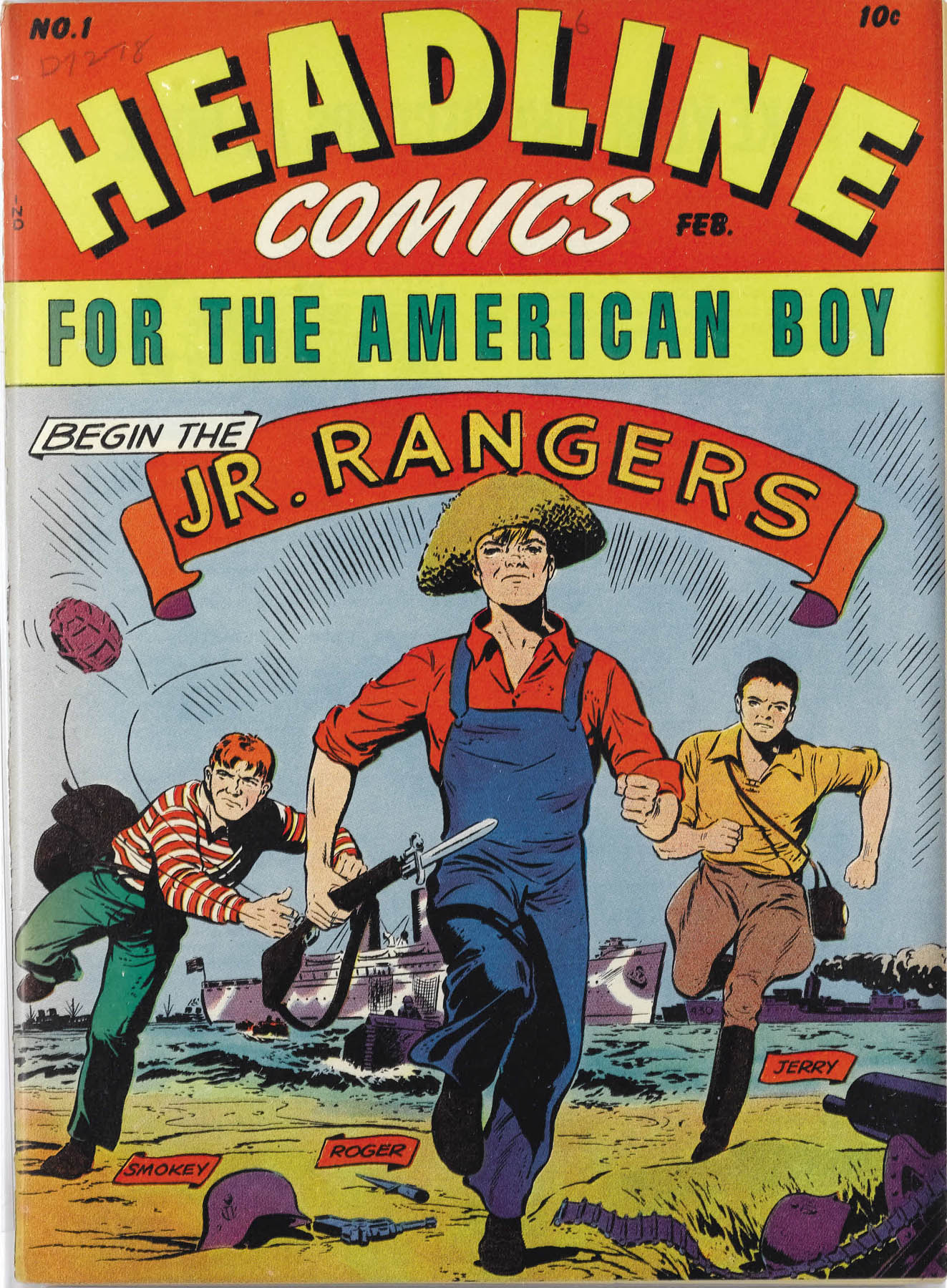
- Cover art for Headline Comics #1 (December 1942), artist unknown.

Publication information
- Publisher: Prize Comics
- Schedule: Irregular
- Format: Standard Golden Age
- Genre: Superhero/adventure (issues #1-22); Crime (issues #23–77)
- Publication date: February 1943 - September–October 1956
- No. of issues: 77

Headline Comics (For The American Boy) was an American comics magazine published by Prize Comics (under the indicia titles American Boys' Comics, Inc. for 21 issues, and Headline Publications, Inc. for 26 issues) from February 1943 – October 1956. The comic was transformed from a boy superhero/adventure title to a crime comic in 1947, with issue #23 (March). The publication became an anthology of the deeds of gangsters and murderers.

The original focus of the comic was the Junior Rangers.

The alteration was the work of Joe Simon and Jack Kirby. The first feature which Simon and Kirby did for Headline Comics was the St. Valentine's Day Massacre. The popularity of the switch in comic genres was sufficient to introduce a companion crime comic, Justice Traps the Guilty, in October/November 1947.

Simon and Kirby differed from other comic competitors by turning out a crime comic which showed restraint in regard to sex and violence.
