= Mort Meskin =

American comic book artist (1916-1995)

- Born: Morton Meskin; May 30, 1916 Brooklyn, New York, U.S.
- Died: March 29, 1995 (aged 78) Yonkers, New York, U.S.
- Area: Artist
- Awards: Will Eisner Hall of Fame Award (2013)

Morton Meskin (May 30, 1916 – March 29, 1995) was an American comic book artist best known for his work in the 1940s Golden Age of Comic Books, well into the late-1950s and 1960s Silver Age.

== Early life ==
Meskin was born in Brooklyn, New York, to parents Max and Rose Meskin. His family was Jewish. He was a childhood fan of pulp magazines, especially The Shadow, and his interests led him to become the art editor of his high school newspaper, and later to attend the Art Students League of New York and Brooklyn's Pratt Institute, from which he graduated in 1938.

== Comics work ==
After finishing school, Meskin went to work for Eisner & Iger, one of the most prominent "packagers" who supplied complete comic books to publishers testing the waters of the emerging medium. There he did pencils for Fiction House's "Sheena, Queen of the Jungle" in Jumbo Comics. In late 1939, he also worked for the packager Harry "A" Chesler, producing material for the MLJ/Archie Comics characters as Ty-Gor son of Tiger, The Press Guardian, Bob Phantom, Mr. Satan, The Shield, Wizard, and Dick Storm between 1939 and 1942.

In 1941, Meskin started at National Comics, drawing stories for the characters Vigilante, Wildcat, Starman and Johnny Quick. He told comics historian and artist Jim Steranko that during this period his art style was heavily influenced by film: "Citizen Kane (1941) influenced us a great deal, all of us. We were very excited about it and spent quite a bit of time discussing it, employing its elements in our work. There was a contest as to who saw it the most times".

In his "Johnny Quick" superhero feature, which appeared from Sept. 1941 through Jan. 1946 in More Fun Comics, Meskin uniquely conveyed the flash-like quick moving actions of Johnny Quick by drawing close knit snapshot-like drawings one next to the other, of the hero in motion. He did not copy DC Comics' "The Flash" or Timely Comics' "The Whizzer" rendering technique of blurred windstreams following those superheroes' every move.

During his time at National, Meskin also did work for Marvel Comics, Gleason and Nedor Comics, Spark Publications, and other publishers. At Spark, he created Golden Lad. At Nedor he worked on the Black Terror as well as on the Fighting Yank together with Jerry Robinson. From 1944 to 1946, he and Robinson formed a studio which produced material for the short-lived publisher Spark Publications.

In 1949, Meskin left National and joined the Simon & Kirby studio where he worked on a variety of titles such as Boys' Ranch and Prize Comics.

He returned to National in 1956, where he created the feature "Mark Merlin" and also worked on a large number of war, science fiction and horror titles.

In 1965, Meskin left the comics world and became a commercial illustrator and storyboard artist in the advertising industry, working at BBD&O until his retirement in 1982. For the next 13 years, he worked as a volunteer at St. Josephs Nursing Home in Yonkers. He died in New York in 1995 at 78.

== Awards ==
In July 2013, during San Diego Comic-Con, Meskin was one of six inductees into the Will Eisner Hall of Fame. The award was presented by Mad magazine cartoonist and Groo the Wanderer creator Sergio Aragonés. The award was accepted posthumously by his son, Peter Meskin. The other inductees were Lee Falk, Al Jaffee, Spain Rodriguez, Joe Sinnott, and Trina Robbins.
