= Der Fuehrer's Face =

1943 Donald Duck cartoon

- Theatrical release poster
- Directed by: Jack Kinney
- Story by: Joe Grant; Dick Huemer
- Produced by: Walt Disney
- Starring: Clarence Nash; Cliff Edwards; Charles Judels
- Music by: Oliver Wallace
- Animation by: Bob Carlson; Les Clark; Bill Justice; Milt Neil; Charles Nichols; John Sibley
- Layouts by: Don DaGradi; Andy Engman
- Color process: Technicolor
- Production company: Walt Disney Productions
- Distributed by: RKO Radio Pictures
- Release date: January 1, 1943
- Running time: 8 minutes
- Country: United States
- Language: English

Der Fuehrer's Face (originally titled Donald Duck in Nutziland or A Nightmare in Nutziland) is an American animated anti-Nazi propaganda short film produced by Walt Disney Productions, created in 1942 and released on January 1, 1943, by RKO Radio Pictures. The cartoon, which features Donald Duck in a nightmare setting working at a factory in Nazi Germany, was made in an effort to sell war bonds and is an example of American propaganda during World War II. The film was directed by Jack Kinney and written by Joe Grant and Dick Huemer. Spike Jones released a version of Oliver Wallace's theme for the short before the film was released.

Often considered one of the greatest animated shorts of the 20th century, Der Fuehrer's Face won the Oscar for Best Animated Short Film at the 15th Academy Awards. It is the only Donald Duck film to receive the honor, although eight other films have also been nominated. In 1994, it was voted Number 22 of "the 50 Greatest Cartoons" of all time by members of the animation field. However, because of the propagandistic nature of the short and the depiction of Donald Duck as a Nazi (albeit a deeply reluctant one), Disney kept the film out of general circulation after its original release. Its first home release came in 2004 with the release of the third wave of the Walt Disney Treasures DVD sets.

== Plot ==
An oom-pah band – composed of Axis leaders Hideki Tojo on the sousaphone, Hermann Göring on the piccolo, Joseph Goebbels on the trombone, Benito Mussolini on the bass drum and Heinrich Himmler on the snare drum – marches while singing the virtues of the Nazi doctrine. They are in a caricature of a German town, where the trees, windmill blades, fences, telephone poles and even clouds are all shaped like swastikas, while the houses resemble Adolf Hitler's face.

Donald Duck, apparently a German citizen in this world, is awoken by his pickelhaube-wearing alarm clock at 4 a.m. He smashes the clock with his fist. His cuckoo clock chimes with a Hitler-esque bird, only for Donald to throw a shoe at it. The rooster outside does the Nazi salute and crows "Heil Hitler". Passing by Donald's house, the band members poke him out of bed with a bayonet. Donald faces and salutes the portraits of Hitler, Hirohito, and Mussolini, then tries to go back to bed, only for someone to splash him with water while yelling angrily in German.

Donald goes to make breakfast. Because of wartime rationing, it consists of bread that's so stale and hard it resembles wood (and must be cut with a saw), coffee brewed from a single hoarded coffee bean, and a bacon-and-egg-flavored breath spray. The band shoves a copy of Mein Kampf in front of him for a moment of reading, then marches into his house and escorts him to a factory, with Donald now carrying the bass drum and Göring kicking him.

Donald "heil[s] right in Der Fuehrer's face".

Upon arriving at the factory (at bayonet-point), Donald starts his "48 hours a day" shift of screwing caps onto artillery shells on an assembly line. Mixed in with the shells are portraits of Der Fuehrer, so Donald must perform the Nazi salute for each portrait, all while screwing the caps on with his other hand, much to his disgust. Each new batch of shells is of a different size, ranging from individual bullets to massive shells larger than Donald. The pace of the assembly line intensifies (as in the Charlie Chaplin comedy Modern Times), and Donald finds it increasingly hard to complete all the tasks. The band's song intermittently resumes, but is now more cynical, saying that Der Fuehrer "lies and rants and raves", the citizens "work like slaves" and that they'd like to see Hitler blown up. A different German-accented voice shouts propaganda messages about the superiority of the Aryan race and the glory of working for Der Fuehrer. When Donald momentarily grumbles in frustration, the guards overhear him and point their bayonets at him, forcing him to fearfully recant his complaints.

Donald has "paid vacation" which consists of forced exercise (contorting his arms into swastika shapes and quickly Nazi-saluting) in front of a painting of the Alps. This only lasts for a few seconds before the voice declares that Donald, "by special decree of Der Fuehrer", must work overtime. The work resumes at an even faster pace while the voice constantly screams orders. Donald has a nervous breakdown with hallucinations of artillery shells, including snake- and bird-shaped shells, army boot shells crushing Donald, and marching band shells that hiss the music. (Some of the animation in this sequence is recycled from the "Pink Elephants on Parade" sequence from Dumbo.)

When the hallucinations are cleared, Donald wakes up in another bed (wearing stars-and-stripes patterned pajamas), only to see the shadow of a figure holding its right hand up. Believing it to be a Nazi salute, he begins to do so himself until he sees that it's actually the shadow of a miniature Statue of Liberty on his windowsill. Donald realizes that the whole thing was a nightmare and he lives in the United States. He kisses and embraces the statue, saying, "Am I glad to be a citizen of the United States of America!"

The short ends with a caricature of Hitler's angry face and a tomato is thrown at it, with the splatter forming the words The End.

== Voice cast ==
- Clarence Nash as Donald Duck
- Cliff Edwards as Nazi lead singer
- Charles Judels as Off-stage Nazi

== Song ==
"Der Fuehrer's Face"

Single by Spike Jones and His City Slickers
- Recorded: 1942
- Songwriter: Oliver Wallace

Before the film's release, the popular band Spike Jones and His City Slickers, noted for their parodies of popular songs of the time, released a version of Oliver Wallace's theme song, "Der Fuehrer's Face" (also known informally as "The Nazi Song"), itself a parody of the Horst-Wessel-Lied, in September 1942 on the RCA Victor Bluebird label. Unlike the version in the cartoon, some Spike Jones versions contain the sound effect of an instrument he called the "birdaphone", a rubber razzer (also known as the Bronx Cheer) with each "Heil!" to show contempt for Hitler (instead, the cartoon version features the sound of a tuba). The so-called "Bronx Cheer" was a well-known expression of disgust in that time period and was not deemed obscene or offensive. The sheet music cover bears the image of Donald Duck throwing a tomato in Hitler's face. In the Jones version, the chorus line, "Ja, we is the supermen—" is answered by a soloist's "Super-duper super men!" effeminately delivered suggesting the prevalence of epicenes among Nazis; in the Disney version, these lines are delivered flatly but with effeminate gestures by Hermann Göring. The recording was very popular, peaking at No. 3 on the U.S. chart.

=== Other versions ===
- Johnny Bond recorded the song in July 1942 on the OKeh label.
- Arthur Fields recorded the song in July 1942 on the Hit Records label.
- Tommy Trinder recorded the song in the United Kingdom soon after the cartoon's release.
- Harry Turtledove adapted the song in one of his Colonization novels, in tune with the novel's theme of an alternate history alien invasion during World War II.

== Political themes ==
Although the film portrays events in Nazi Germany, its release came while the United States also was on total war footing. Coffee, meat and food oils were being rationed, civilians were heavily employed in military production, and propaganda in support of the war effort (such as the film itself) was pervasive. The film's criticism therefore emphasizes violence and terror under the Nazi government, as compared with the dull grind that all the warring nations faced.

== Censorship ==
In 2010, Der Fuehrer's Face was ruled by a local court in Kamchatka, Russia to be included in the national list of extremist materials, which was first created in 2002. This was due to a local who received a suspended sentence of six months for uploading it to the internet and "inciting hatred and enmity". In July 2016, another Russian court reversed the ruling of the local court, removing the short film from the list. The court highlighted that the film's portrayal of Nazism through caricature form cannot be deemed "extremist" in nature.

== In popular culture ==
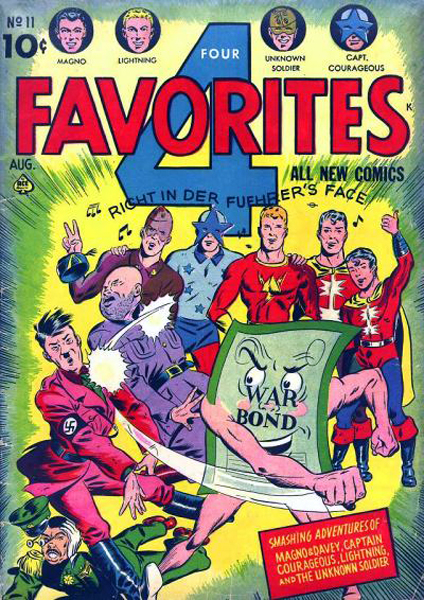
Four Favorites #11, August 1943

- In August 1943, the cover of the comic book Four Favorites #11 depicted The Unknown Soldier, Captain Courageous, Lightning, Magno, and Magno's sidekick Davey all singing "Right in Der Fuehrer's face!" while an anthropomorphic war bond simultaneously knocks out Hirohito, Hitler, and Mussolini in one punch.

== Home media ==
The short was released on May 18, 2004 on Walt Disney Treasures: Walt Disney on the Front Lines.

== See also ==
- Education for Death
- Blitz Wolf
- Commando Duck
- List of World War II short films
