= Raven (Ace Comics) =

The Raven

Publication information
- Publisher: Ace Comics
- First appearance: Sure-Fire Comics #1 (June 1940)

In-story information
- Alter ego: Danny Dartin
- Team affiliations: The Super-Mysterymen
- Abilities: None

The Raven is a superhero who first appeared in the Ace Comics title Sure-Fire Comics. He is based on the pulp hero "The Moon Man" published by Periodic House, the pulp publisher connected to Ace Comics.

== Publication history ==
The Raven was inspired by the pulp hero Moon Man, created by Frederick C. Davis, published in Ten Detective Aces magazine. At least the first story was based on the first Moon Man story. His companions are Lola Lash, the daughter of the police chief, and his chauffeur Mike.

The Raven first appeared in Sure-Fire Comics #1 (June 1940), as did Lash Lightning.

According to Jess Nevins' Encyclopedia of Golden Age Superheroes, "the Raven's enemies are corrupt bankers, racketeers, the police (led by Police Chief Lash, who loathes the Raven), and the odd costumed villain such as the Eel".

In 2008, The Raven (now renamed Mr. Raven to avoid a trademark conflict with DC Comics) appeared in flashback in Project Superpowers #0; in the one-shot Project Superpowers: Chapter Two Prelude, it's stated that Mr. Raven will appear in this line as a member of a team called The Super-Mysterymen (presumably named after the Ace title Super-Mystery Comics).

In 2018, publisher Pulp 2.0 put out a complete collection of Raven stories, The Raven Collection.

== Fictional biography ==
=== Ace ===
In 1940, New York City Detective Sergeant Danny Dartin, tired of seeing criminals manipulate the law to escape justice, became a masked vigilante called The Raven and acted as a modern "Robin Hood", stealing money from criminals and redistributing it to the poor. He was aided in this by Lola Lash, the police chief’s daughter.

=== Project Superpowers ===
At some point after World War II, Mr. Raven was imprisoned in the mystical Urn of Pandora, along with many other crime-fighters, by the misguided Fighting Yank; decades later, the Urn was broken and the heroes freed. Mr. Raven, along with seven other heroes (including Captain Courageous, Lash Lightning and Lightning Girl, Soldier Unknown), Vulcan and the Sword, was then recruited to form a team called The Super-Mysterymen, whose purpose is not yet known.
