= Captain Courageous =

Captain Courageous may refer to:

- Captain Courageous (comics), a comic book character
- Paul Kelly (Australian rules footballer) (born 1969), Australian Rules footballer

== See also ==
- Captains Courageous, an 1897 novel by Rudyard Kipling
