= A. A. Wyn's Magazine Publishers =

American magazine publishing house

Magazine Publishers was a pulp magazine publishing house established by Harold Hersey and later owned by A. A. Wyn in 1929. Under Wyn, it was known as "Ace Magazines", hence titles such as Ace Mystery and Ace Sports. They also used the name "Periodical House", and also branched out to publishing comic books as Ace Comics. In the 1940s the company also began publishing books.

In 1952 Wyn founded Ace Books, and by the mid-fifties Wyn had sold most or all of his hardback rights, and may also have ceased publishing magazines by that time to focus on Ace Books.

== Magazines ==
External images
- via The Internet Archive
- Secret Agent X (September 1934)
- Ten Detective Aces (February 1935)
- Western Trails (September 1942)

- Ace Detective Magazine
- Ace Mystery
- Ace Sports
- Detective Digest
- Detective-Dragnet (later changed to Ten Detective Aces)
- Detective Romances
- Eerie Stories
- Flying Aces (later became Flying Models and sold off)
- Gold Seal Detective
- Lone Wolf Detective
- Love Fiction Weekly
- Secret Agent X
- Spy Novels Magazine
- Spy Stories
- Sure-Fire Detective Magazine
- Variety Detective Magazine
- Western Trails

== Pulp heroes ==
- Captain Hazzard
- Moon Man
- Secret Agent X
- Wade Hammond
