= Ace Magazines =

American comic book publishing company

- Type: Comic book publisher
- Industry: Publishing
- Genre: Superheroes Horror Crime Romance
- Founded: 1940; 86 years ago
- Founder: Aaron A. Wyn, Rose Wyn
- Defunct: 1956; 70 years ago
- Fate: Defunct
- Headquarters: Springfield, Massachusetts, United States
- Products: Comics
- Parent: Periodical House, Magazine Publishers

Ace Magazines was a comic book and pulp magazine publishing company headed by Aaron A. Wyn and his wife Rose Wyn. The Wyns had been publishing pulp fiction under the Periodical House and A. A. Wyn's Magazine Publishers names since 1928, and published comics between 1940 and the end of 1956.

== Overview ==
Its most successful and longest-running superhero title was Super-Mystery Comics featuring Magno the Magnetic Man and his boy partner Davey, who appeared in 28 issues of the title's 48-issue run. Magno is nearly unique among superheroes for having neither an origin for his powers or any apparent secret identity. Horror comics included Baffling Mysteries, Hand of Fate, and Web of Mystery, while their contribution to the crime comics was Crime Must Pay the Penalty (the title later shortened to Penalty for the final two issues). Ace's longest running series were the company's romance comics Glamorous Romances, Love At First Sight, Love Experiences, and Real Love, which began in the late 1940s as the superhero books faded away, and continued until the company ceased publishing comic books in 1956. Other long running romance titles such as Complete Love Magazine and Ten Story Love began as pulp-magazine titles before switching to comics format in the early 1950s.

A number of Ace stories were used as examples of violent and gruesome imagery in the 1950s U.S Congressional inquiries into the influence of comic books on juvenile delinquency that led to the Comics Code Authority, namely Challenge of the Unknown #6, Crime Must Pay the Penalty #3 and Web of Mystery #19. Western Adventures Comics #3 was used as an example in Fredric Wertham's Seduction of the Innocent, and in the United Kingdom Atomic War #4, Beyond #18 and World War III #2 were cited as examples by Geoffrey Wagner's 1954 book on the same subject, Parade of Pleasure — A Study of Popular Iconography in the U.S.A.

Although characters with the same names as Ace Comics characters have appeared elsewhere (most notably Jack Kirby's Captain Victory in an early 1980s series, and several DC Comics villains called the Black Spider), after the early 1950s all their characters remained unused until 2008, when Lash Lightning and Lightning Girl appeared in flashback in Dynamite Entertainment’s Project Superpowers. In the one-shot Project Superpowers: Chapter Two Prelude, it was stated that the two of them will appear in this line as part of a team called The Super-Mysterymen (presumably named after the Ace title Super-Mystery Comics).

== Comics published ==
=== Imprints ===
Ace Magazine comic-book series were published through at least 17 affiliated entities:

- A. A. Wyn, Inc.
- Ace Books, Inc.
- Ace Magazines, Inc.
- Ace Periodicals, Inc.
- Ace Publications
- Ace Publications, Inc.
- Current Books, Inc.
- Humor Publications, Inc.
- Junior Books, Inc.
- Junior Magazines, Inc.
- L. B. Fischer Publishing Corp.
- Periodical House, Inc.
- Publishers Specialists, Inc.
- RAR Publishing Co., Inc.
- Readers' Research, Inc.
- Red Seal Publications, Inc.
- Unity Publishing Corp.

=== Titles ===
- All Love Romances #26 (May 1949); from Ernie Comics, see All Love - under Ace Periodicals / Current Books imprint
- All Love #27–32 (July 1949–May 1950);l from All Love Romances - under Ace Periodicals / Current Books imprint
- All Romances #1–6 (August 1949–June 1950); see Mr. Risk - under AA Wyn / Ace Periodicals & Humor Publications imprints
- Andy Comics #20–21 (June 1948–August 1948); from Scream Comics, see Ernie Comics - under Current Publications imprint
- Atomic War! #1–4 (November 1952–April 1953) - under Ace Periodicals / Junior Books imprint
- Baffling Mysteries #5–8 (November 1951–October 1955); from Indian Braves, see Heroes of the Wild Frontier - under Periodical House imprint
- Banner Comics #3–5 (September 1941–January 1942) - under Ace Periodicals / Periodical House imprint
- The Beyond #1–30 (November 1950–January 1955) - under Ace Magazines, Unity Publishing, and Periodical House imprints
- Captain Courageous Comics #6 (March 1942); from Banner Comics - under Periodical House imprint
- Challenge of the Unknown #6 (September 1950); from Love Experiences - under Ace Magazines imprint
- Complete Love Magazine #158–191 [v26 n2–v32 n4] (May 1951–September 1956); continued from the pulp magazine - under Ace Periodicals / Periodical House imprint
- Crime Must Pay the Penalty #1 [numbered 33]–46 (February 1948–June 1955); from Four Favorites, see Penalty! - under Current Books imprint
- Dotty #35–40 (June 1948–May 1949); from Four Teeners, see Glamorous Romances - under AA Wyn imprint
- Ernie Comics #22–25 (September 1948–March 1949); from Andy Comics, see All Love Romances - under Current Books imprint
- Four Favorites #1–32 (September 1941–December 1947); see Crime Must Pay the Penalty and Four Teeners
- Four Teeners #34 (April 1948); from Four Favorites via Crime Must Pay the Penalty #33
- Fun Time #1–4 (Spring 1953–Winter 1953) - under Ace Periodicals imprint
- Glamorous Romances #41–90 (July 1949–October 1956); from Dotty - under AA Wyn imprint
- The Hand of Fate #8–26 [numbered 25] (December 1951–December 1954); from Men Against Crime
- Hap Hazard Comics #1–24 (Summer 1944–February 1949); see Real Love - under Reader Research imprint
- Heroes of the Wild Frontier #27–28 (January 1956–April 1956); from Baffling Mysteries - under Ace Periodicals imprint
- Indian Braves #1–4 (March 1951–September 1951); see Baffling Mysteries - under Ace Magazines imprint
- Lightning Comics #1–13 [v1 n4–v3 n1] (December 1940–June 1942); from Sure-Fire Comics
- Love At First Sight #1–43 (October 1949–November 1956) - Under RAR Publishing Co / Periodical House imprints
- Love Experiences #1–38 (October 1949–June 1956) - under AA Wyn / Periodical House imprint
- Men Against Crime #3–7 (February 1951–October 1951); from Mr. Risk, see The Hand of Fate - under Ace Magazines imprint
- Monkeyshines Comics #1–27 (Summer 1944–July 1949) - under Ace / Publishers Specialists / Current Books / Unity Publishing imprints
- Mr. Risk #1–2 (October 1950–December 1950); see Men Against Crime - under Ace Magazines imprint
- Our Flag Comics 1–5 (August1941–April 1942)
- Penalty #47–48 (November 1955–January 1956); cover titled Penalty!
- Real-Life Secrets (#September 1, 1949) - under Ace Periodicals imprint
- Real Love #25–76 (April 1949–November 1956); from Hap Hazard Comics - under AA Wyn imprint
- Real Secrets #2–5 (November 1950–May 1950); from Real-Life Secrets - under Ace Periodicals imprint
- Real-Life Secrets #1 (September 1949); see Real Secrets - under Ace Books imprint
- Revealing Romances #1–6 (September 1949–August 1950) - under Ace Periodicals imprint
- Science Comics #10û5 (January 1946–September 1946) - under Humor Publications imprint
- Scream Comics #1–19 (Autumn 1944–April 1948); see Andy Comics - under Humor Publications / Current Books / Ace imprint
- Space Action Comics #1–3 (June 1952–October 1952) - under Junior Books imprint
- Super-Mystery Comics #1–48 [v1 n1–v8 n6] (July 1940–July 1949) - under Periodical House and Ace Periodicals imprints
- Sure-Fire Comics #1–4 [numbered #3] (June 1940–October 1940); see Lightning Comics - includes 2 issues #3's
- Ten-Story Love #177–210 [v29 n3–v36 n6] (June 1951–September 1956); continued from the pulp magazine - under Ace Periodicals imprint
- Trapped! #1–4 (October 1954–April 1955) - under Periodical House imprint
- Vicky Comics #1–5 (October 1948–June 1949) - under Ace Magazines imprint
- War Heroes #1–8 (May 1952–April 1953) - under Ace Magazines imprint
- Web of Mystery #1–29 (February 1951–February 1955) - under AA Wyn imprint
- Western Adventures Comics #1–6 (October 1948–August 1949); see Western Love Trails - under Ace Magazines imprint
- Western Love Trails #7–9 (November 1949–March 1950) - under AA Wyn imprint
- World War III #1–2 (#March 1953–May 1953) - under Ace Periodicals imprint

== Characters ==
- Ace McCoy (in Sure-Fire Comics)
- The Black Ace (in Four Favourites, Super-Mystery Comics)
- The Black Spider (in Super-Mystery Comics)
- Buckskin (in Super-Mystery Comics)
- Buck Steele (in Sure-Fire Comics)
- The Clown (in Super-Mystery Comics)
- Captain Courageous (in Banner Comics, Captain Courageous Comics, Four Favourites)
- Captain Victory (in Our Flag Comics)
- Corporal Flint of the RCMP (in Super-Mystery Comics)
- Doctor Nemesis (in Lightning Comics, Super-Mystery Comics). A version of this character has been adapted to Marvel Comics stories.
- The Flag (in Four Favourites, Our Favourites)
- Green Arrowhead (in Indian Braves)
- Hap Hazard (in Four Favourites, Hap Hazard Comics)
- The Lancer (in Super-Mystery Comics)
- Lash Lightning and Lightning Girl (in Lightning Comics, Sure-Fire Comics (as Flash Lightning))
- Lone Warrior and Sidekick Dicky (in Banner Comics, Captain Courageous Comics)
- Magno the Magnetic Man (in Four Favourites, Super-Mystery Comics)
- Marvo the Magician (in Sure-Fire Comics)
- Mr. Risk (in Four Favourites, Men Against Crime, Mr. Risk, Our Favourites, Super-Mystery Comics)
- The Raven (in Sure-Fire Comics and Lightning Comics) based on Ace pulp character Moon Man.
- The Sword (in Captain Courageous Comics, Lightning Comics, Super-Mystery Comics)
- The Unknown (in Four Favourites)
- The Unknown Soldier (in Our Flag Comics)
- Vulcan (in Four Favourites, Super-Mystery Comics)
- Whiz Wilson, Time Traveler (in Sure-Fire Comics)
- X The Phantom Fed (in Sure-Fire Comics and Lightning Comics) based on Ace pulp character Secret Agent X.

== See also ==
List of Golden Age of Comics publishers
