= Rebel Love =

- VHS cover
- Directed by: Milton Bagby
- Written by: Milton Bagby
- Produced by: Shirley Fulton Crumley; John D. Quenelle
- Starring: Jamie Rose; Terence Knox; Thom Gossom Jr. Charles Hill; Harry Howell; Rick Waln; Carl Spurlock; Fran Ryan
- Cinematography: Joseph A. Whigham
- Edited by: Mellena Bridges
- Music by: Bobby Horton
- Distributed by: Troma Entertainment
- Release date: 1985
- Running time: 90 minutes
- Country: United States
- Language: English

Rebel Love is a 1985 drama film written and directed by Milton Bagby and starring Jamie Rose and Terence Knox. It was distributed by Troma Entertainment.

Set during the American Civil War, the film follows a Yankee war widow (played by Rose) who takes an injured Confederate spy (played by Knox) into her home out of pity, only to find herself falling in love with him.

The picture was shot on locations in Birmingham and Bessemer, Alabama during the summer of 1983, with many scenes filmed at the Tannehill Ironworks Historical State Park. The producers utilized local crews and talent as much as possible.

The film was a finalist in the 1985 USA Film Festival in Dallas. Despite a modest theatrical run, Rebel Love enjoyed a cable release on Showtime and was later distributed on video by Vestron. Rose, who started on television in the series Falcon Crest, went on to star in her own 1980s crime drama series, Lady Blue. Knox, who first gained fame as the villainous Dr. Peter White on the series St. Elsewhere, later starred for three years as the lead character on the popular series Tour of Duty, a Vietnam War drama.
