= Moon Man (character) =

Publication information
- Publisher: Aces Magazine
- First appearance: Ten Detective Aces (June 1, 1933)
- Created by: Frederick C. Davis

In-story information
- Alter ego: Stephen Thatcher

The Moon Man is a fictional pulp magazine character who appeared in Ten Detective Aces magazine, published by A.A. Wyn's Ace Magazines. He was a pulp hero in the Robin Hood mold. Frederick C. Davis (1902–1977) created the character and wrote all the original stories under his own name. Davis, who after his time as a pulp writer had a long career as a mystery novelist, generally wrote under various pen names.

== Character ==
The Moon Man was so named because he concealed his identity with a spherical helmet of Argus (one-way mirror) glass, which gave a mirrored appearance. The one-of-a-kind helmet was hinged to allow him to don it, and it had a built-in disperser so his breath did not fog up the inside of it. He also wore a black robe with black gloves. Though the Moon Man robbed mainly villains, he was viewed by the police as a criminal and was wanted for numerous burglaries, two kidnappings and a murder. All the loot he took was distributed secretly to the poor of Great City (it was in the midst of the Great Depression) by the Moon Man's ally, Ned "Angel" Dargan, an ex-boxer he had saved from starvation and sickness.

The Moon Man was really Detective-Sergeant Stephen Thatcher, son of Great City's Police Chief, Peter Thatcher. His main opponent was (Plain Clothes) Detective Lieutenant, Gil McEwen, who worked to capture the Moon Man and send him to the Electric Chair. Sue McEwen, Gil's daughter was engaged to Steve Thatcher and at first did not know his secret.

Steve Thatcher killed off the Moon Man at the end of the Silver Death story but he was forced to bring him back to battle The Red Ring, a group of blackmailers who used tetanus as a weapon of death, over the next three issues because they knew his secret identity and forced him and Sue to do their criminal bidding.

== Stories ==
1. "The Sinister Sphere", 06/01/33
2. "Blood on the Moon", 07/01/33
3. "Moon Wizard", 08/01/33
4. "The Silver Secret", 09/01/33
5. "Black Lightning", 10/01/33
6. "Night Nemesis", 11/01/33
7. "Murder Moon", 12/01/33
8. "Silver Death", 01/01/34
9. "Mark of the Moon Man", 02/01/34
10. "Crimson Shackles", 03/01/34
11. "Blood Bargain", 04/01/34
12. "The White Lash", 05/01/34
13. "The Murder Master", 06/01/34
14. "Moon Doom", 07/01/34
15. "Calling 'Car 13'", 08/01/34
16. "Fingers of Fear", 09/01/34
17. "Corpse's Alibi", 10/01/34
18. "The Sinister Snatch", 11/01/34
19. "Badge of Blood", 12/01/34
20. "Ghoul's Gamble", 01/01/35
21. "The Silver Snare", 02/01/35
22. "The Crimson Snare", 03/01/35
23. "Satan's Stepson", 04/01/35
24. "The Silver Spectre", 05/01/35
25. "The Dial of Doom", 06/01/35
26. "The Masked Scourge", 08/01/35
27. "The Master of Murder River", 09/01/35
28. "Counterfeit Corpse", 10/01/35
29. "Homicide Dividends", 11/01/35
30. "Robe of Blood", 12/01/35
31. "The Whispering Death", 01/01/36
32. "Death's Last Bargian", 02/01/36
33. "Corpse's Plunder", 03/01/36
34. "Preview to Murder", 05/01/36
35. "Ghoul's Carnival", 07/01/36
36. "Skeleton's Snare", 09/01/36
37. "Murder for a Pastime", 11/01/36
38. "Whitejack Jury", 01/01/37

== Comics ==
Comic book stories of the Moon Man appeared in Ace Comics' Sure-Fire Comics and Lightning Comics under the name "The Raven". He appeared in all issues of these titles. At least the first story was based on the first Moon Man story.

== Reprints and new stories ==
A few Moon Man stories were reprinted in later years, with a proposal in the mid-1980s to reprint all the stories in two volumes from "Purple Prose Press". Only the first volume, Night Nemesis, saw print. More recently, the small press Battered Silicon Dispatch Box published the two volumes as a set. Altus Press is now reprinting the entire series in 6 volumes, the first came out in late 2015.

A few new Moon Man stories have also appeared in pulp fanzines. Longer works include The Hounds of Hell, published by Airship 27, which pitted the Moon Man against pulp villain Doctor Satan. The newer stories were written by Ken Janssens, Gary Lovisi, Erwin K. Roberts and Andrew Salmon. Airship 27 published Paperback, eBook and Audiobook collections of these stories, called The Moon Man Volume One, in 2012. Moon Man Volume Two, with stories by Gene Moyers, Greg Hatcher, Terry Alexander and Tim Holter Bruckner was published by Airship 27 in 2018.

Anderfam Press is currently reprinting the stories under the title The Moon Man Archives, available through Amazon on their Kindles. Of the five ebooks (21 stories) so far reprinted, books 1–3 and 5 are not available in the UK. Only in the US. 1 and 2 were originally available in Britain. The Moon Man Omnibus, available through Kindle from the same company now reprints all 38 of the Moon Man stories.
