= Milton Bagby =

American actor

- Born: Birmingham, Alabama
- Occupations: Voice Actor and Author

Milton Bagby is an Audie Award-winning American voice actor and author who has recorded over 350 audiobooks and dozens of short stories, narratives and commercials.

A veteran voice over talent in radio and television commercials, Bagby produced his first ACX title, "Organizational Culture and Leadership" for Audible's ACX system in 2011. He has also produced a number of titles for Radio Archives, a distributor of old time radio programs and pulp fiction reprints.

In addition to producing and recording audiobooks, Bagby has written or co-written five novels and a stage play, all published with Amazon through KDP/Createspace.

A native of Alabama, Bagby has lived in Nashville, Tennessee, for over 20 years.

== Audiobooks ==
=== Non-Fiction ===
Year	Title	Genre	Subject	Publisher	Author
2009	Parenting Beyond Belief	Non-Fiction	Family	Amacom Press	Dale McGowan
2009	The Birth of Modern Politics	Non-Fiction	History	Oxford University Press	Lynn Hudson Parsons
2009	This Is Your Country On Drugs	Non-Fiction	Sociology	John Wiley & Sons	Ryan Grim
2011	Organizational Culture and Leadership	Non-Fiction	Business	Jossey-Bass	Dr. Edgar H. Schein
2011	They Have Killed Papa Dead	Non-Fiction	History	Steerforth	Anthony Pitch
2012	Cutthroats	Non-Fiction	History	Presidio Press	R. C. Dick
2015	The Art of Living	Non-Fiction	Speech	StudySync	Mark Twain
2015	The Insurrection	Non-Fiction	Article	StudySync	Wm Lloyd Garrison
2015	The Challenger Disaster	Non-Fiction	Speech	StudySync	Peggy Noonan
2016	The Awakening of H. K. Derryberry	Non-Fiction	Biography	Thomas Nelson	Jim Bradford and Andy Hardin
2016	Texas Declaration of Independence	Non Fiction	Historical	StudySync	Various
2017	Giving It All Away	Non Fiction	Biography	Zondervan	David Green with Bill High
2017	Eyewitness to Miracles	Non Fiction	Inspirational	Thomas Nelson	Randy Clark
2018	Stories I Love to Tell	Non Fiction	Inspirational	Thomas Nelson	Gene Edwards
2018	Johnny Cash: Forever Words	Non Fiction	Poetry	Blackstone	Edited by Paul Muldoon
2018	The Luckiest Man	Non Fiction	Biography	Thomas Nelson	John R. Paine with Seth Haines
2018	Waiting on God	Non Fiction	Inspirational	Gault Media	Andrew Murray
2018	Simply Faulkner	Non Fiction	Biography	Simply Charly	Philip Weinstein
2018	The Paris Husband	Non Fiction	Biography	Simply Charly	Scott Donaldson

=== General Fiction ===
Year	Title	Genre	Subject	Publisher	Author
2009	The Dealer	Fiction	Novel	Books in Motion	Mark Jenest
2010	Island Life	Fiction	Novel	Books in Motion	Michael W. Sherer
2010	Poacher's Moon	Fiction	Novel	Books in Motion	John D. Nesbit
2011	Trailin'	Fiction	Novel	Books in Motion	Max Brand
2013	Coffin Blues	Fiction	Novel	Crossroad Press	Tom Piccirilli
2013	Drummer Boy	Fiction	Novel	Haunted Computer	Scott Nicholson
2013	Man Killer Book 1	Fiction	Novel	Signet	Thom Nicholson
2013	Man Killer Book 2	Fiction	Novel	Signet	Thom Nicholson
2013	Man Killer Book 3	Fiction	Novel	Signet	Thom Nicholson
2013	Unhinged	Fiction	Short Stories	Crossroad Press	Ronald Kelly
2013	Burial To Follow	Fiction	Novella	Haunted Computer	Scott Nicholson
2013	The Wolf Ace	Fiction	Short Story	Radio Archives	various
2013	The Blue Scorpion	Fiction	Novella	Radio Archives	various
2014	They Hunger	Fiction	Novel	Haunted Computer	Scott Nicholson
2014	Horror Stories	Fiction	Short Stories	Radio Archives	Frederick C. Davis
2014	The Monster of the Lagoon	Fiction	Novel	Radio Archives	George F. Worts
2014	The Secret Six	Fiction	Short Stories	Radio Archives	Various
2014	The Curved Sword	Fiction	Novel	Radio Archives	Harold Lamb
2014	The Strangers	Fiction	Novel	Radio Archives	Mort Castle
2014	The Pecos Kid	Fiction	Novel	Radio Archives	Dan Cushman
2014	Minions of the Moon	Fiction	Novel	Radio Archives	William Grey Beyer
2014	The Complete Cases of Max Latin	Fiction	Novellas	Radio Archives	Norbert Davis
2015	Beg For Mercy	Fiction	Novel	CreateSpace	Milton Bagby
2015	Dr. Yen Sin	Fiction	Short Stories	Radio Archives	various
2015	Dusty Ayres, Vol. One	Fiction	Short Stories	Radio Archives	various
2015	Dusty Ayres, Vol. Two	Fiction	Short Stories	Radio Archives	various
2015	Dead Man's Kiss	Fiction	Novel	Radio Archives	Robert Weinberg
2015	Wild West Detective	Fiction	Novel	Radio Archives	James Clay
2015	Lie Catchers	Fiction	Novel	Radio Archives	Paul Bishop
2015	Home	Fiction	Short Story	StudySync	Anton Chekov
2015	The Monsters Are Due on Maple Street	Fiction	TV Script	StudySync	Rod Serling
2015	The Nose	Fiction	Short Story	StudySync	Nikolai Gogol
2015	The Celebrated Jumping Frog of Calaveras County	Fiction	Short Story	StudySync	Mark Twain
2015	To Build a Fire	Fiction	Short Story	StudySync	Jack London
2016	Songbird of the West	Fiction	Novel	Radio Archives	James Clay
2016	The Most Dangerous Game	Fiction	Short Story	StudySync	Richard Connell
2016	A Sound of Thunder	Fiction	Short Story	StudySync	Ray Bradbury
2016	The Looking Glass	Fiction	Short Story	StudySync	Anton Chekov
2016	Kill Me Again	Fiction	Novel	Radio Archives	Paul Bishop
2017	Paint by Numbers	Fiction	Novel	Elephant Audiobooks	Mark Sublette
2017	Kayenta Crossing	Fiction	Novel	Elephant Audiobooks	Mark Sublette
2017	Hidden Canyon	Fiction	Novel	Elephant Audiobooks	Mark Sublette
2017	Stone Men	Fiction	Novel	Elephant Audiobooks	Mark Sublette
2017	The Butterfly Twins	Fiction	Novel	Elephant Audiobooks	Mark Sublette
2017	Grave Sins	Fiction	Novel	Radio Archives	Paul Bishop
2018	Between the White Lines	Fiction	Novel	Elephant Audiobooks	Mark Sublette
2018	Indian School Days	Fiction	Novel	Elephant Audiobooks	Mark Sublette
2018	Lie Catchers	Fiction	Novel	Radio Archives	Paul Bishop
2018	All We Ever Wanted	Fiction	Novel	Random House Audio	Emily Giffin
2018	Gunfighter's Revenge	Fiction	Novel	Radio Archives	James Clay

=== The Secret Agent X Series ===
Year	Title	Genre	Subject	Publisher	Author
2014	The Torture Trust	Fiction	Novel	Radio Archives	Paul Chadwick
2014	The Spectral Strangler	Fiction	Novel	Radio Archives	Paul Chadwick
2014	The Death Torch Terror	Fiction	Novel	Radio Archives	Paul Chadwick
2014	The Ambassador of Doom	Fiction	Novel	Radio Archives	Paul Chadwick
2015	City of the Living Dead	Fiction	Novel	Radio Archives	Unknown
2015	Hand of Horror	Fiction	Novel	Radio Archives	Emile C. Tepperman
2015	Octopus of Crime	Fiction	Novel	Radio Archives	Paul Chadwick
2015	The Hooded Hordes	Fiction	Novel	Radio Archives	Paul Chadwick
2015	Servants of the Skull	Fiction	Novel	Radio Archives	Emile C. Tepperman
2015	The Murder Monster	Fiction	Novel	Radio Archives	Emile C. Tepperman
2015	The Sinister Scourge	Fiction	Novel	Radio Archives	Paul Chadwick
2015	The Curse of the Waiting Death	Fiction	Novel	Radio Archives	Paul Chadwick
2016	Devils of Darkness	Fiction	Novel	Radio Archives	Paul Chadwick
2016	Talons of Terror	Fiction	Novel	Radio Archives	Emile C. Tepperman
2016	The Corpse Cavalcade	Fiction	Novel	Radio Archives	G. T. Fleming-Roberts
2016	The Golden Ghoul	Fiction	Novel	Radio Archives	G. T. Fleming-Roberts
2016	Monarch of Murder	Fiction	Novel	Radio Archives	Paul Chadwick
2016	Legion of the Living Dead	Fiction	Novel	Radio Archives	G. T. Fleming-Roberts
2016	Horde of the Damned	Fiction	Novel	Radio Archives	Paul Chadwick
2016	Ringmaster of Doom	Fiction	Novel	Radio Archives	G. T. Fleming-Roberts
2016	Kingdom of Blue Corpses	Fiction	Novel	Radio Archives	Paul Chadwick
2016	Brand of the Metal Maiden	Fiction	Novel	Radio Archives	G. T. Fleming-Roberts
2016	Dividends of Doom	Fiction	Novel	Radio Archives	G. T. Fleming-Roberts
2016	The Fear Merchants	Fiction	Novel	Radio Archives	Paul Chadwick
2016	Faceless Fury	Fiction	Novel	Radio Archives	G. T. Fleming-Roberts
2016	Subterranean Scourge	Fiction	Novel	Radio Archives	G. T. Fleming-Roberts
2016	The Doom Director	Fiction	Novel	Radio Archives	G. T. Fleming-Roberts
2016	Horror's Handclasp	Fiction	Novel	Radio Archives	G. T. Fleming-Roberts
2016	City of Madness	Fiction	Novel	Radio Archives	G. T. Fleming-Roberts
2016	Death's Frozen Formula	Fiction	Novel	Radio Archives	G. T. Fleming-Roberts
2016	The Murder Brain	Fiction	Novel	Radio Archives	G. T. Fleming-Roberts
2016	Slaves of the Scorpion	Fiction	Novel	Radio Archives	G. T. Fleming-Roberts
2016	Satan's Syndicate	Fiction	Novel	Radio Archives	G. T. Fleming-Roberts
2016	The Assassins' League	Fiction	Novel	Radio Archives	G. T. Fleming-Roberts
2016	Plague of the Golden Death	Fiction	Novel	Radio Archives	Wayne Rogers
2016	Curse of the Mandarin's Fan	Fiction	Novel	Radio Archives	G. T. Fleming-Roberts
2016	Claws of the Corpse Cult	Fiction	Novel	Radio Archives	G. T. Fleming-Roberts
2016	The Corpse That Murdered	Fiction	Novel	Radio Archives	G. T. Fleming-Roberts
2016	Curse of the Crimson Horde	Fiction	Novel	Radio Archives	Paul Chadwick
2016	The Corpse Contraband	Fiction	Novel	Radio Archives	G. T. Fleming-Roberts
2016	Yoke of the Crimson Coterie	Fiction	Novel	Radio Archives	G. T. Fleming-Roberts

=== The Operator #5 Series ===
Year	Title	Genre	Subject	Publisher	Author
2015	The Melting Death	Fiction	Novel	Radio Archives	Frederick C. Davis
2015	Cavern of the Damned	Fiction	Novel	Radio Archives	Frederick C. Davis
2015	Master of Broken Men	Fiction	Novel	Radio Archives	Frederick C. Davis
2015	Invasion of the Dark Legions	Fiction	Novel	Radio Archives	Frederick C. Davis
2015	The Green Death Mists	Fiction	Novel	Radio Archives	Frederick C. Davis
2015	Legions of Starvation	Fiction	Novel	Radio Archives	Frederick C. Davis
2015	The Red Invader	Fiction	Novel	Radio Archives	Frederick C. Davis
2015	League of War Monsters	Fiction	Novel	Radio Archives	Frederick C. Davis
2015	The Army of the Dead	Fiction	Novel	Radio Archives	Frederick C. Davis
2015	March of the Flame Marauders	Fiction	Novel	Radio Archives	Frederick C. Davis
2015	Blood Reign of the Dictator	Fiction	Novel	Radio Archives	Frederick C. Davis
2015	Invasion of the Yellow War Lords	Fiction	Novel	Radio Archives	Frederick C. Davis
2015	Legions of the Death Master	Fiction	Novel	Radio Archives	Frederick C. Davis
2015	Hosts of the Flaming Death	Fiction	Novel	Radio Archives	Frederick C. Davis
2015	Invasion of the Crimson Death Cult	Fiction	Novel	Radio Archives	Frederick C. Davis
2015	Attack of the Blizzard Men	Fiction	Novel	Radio Archives	Frederick C. Davis
2015	Scourge of the Invisible Death	Fiction	Novel	Radio Archives	Frederick C. Davis
2015	Raiders of the Red Death	Fiction	Novel	Radio Archives	Emile C. Tepperman
2015	War Dogs of the Green Destroyer	Fiction	Novel	Radio Archives	Emile C. Tepperman
2015	Rockets from Hell	Fiction	Novel	Radio Archives	Emile C. Tepperman
2015	War Masters from the Orient	Fiction	Novel	Radio Archives	Emile C. Tepperman
2015	Crime's Reign of Terror	Fiction	Novel	Radio Archives	Emile C. Tepperman
2017	Death's Ragged Army	Fiction	Novel	Radio Archives	Emile C. Tepperman
2017	Patriots' Death Battalion	Fiction	Novel	Radio Archives	Emile C. Tepperman
2017	The Bloody Forty-Five Days	Fiction	Novel	Radio Archives	Emile C. Tepperman
2017	America's Plague Battalions	Fiction	Novel	Radio Archives	Emile C. Tepperman
2017	Liberty's Suicide Legions	Fiction	Novel	Radio Archives	Emile C. Tepperman
2017	The Siege of the Thousand Patriots	Fiction	Novel	Radio Archives	Emile C. Tepperman
2017	Patriots' Death March	Fiction	Novel	Radio Archives	Emile C. Tepperman
2018	Revolt of the Lost Legions	Fiction	Novel	Radio Archives	Emile C. Tepperman
2018	Drums of Destruction	Fiction	Novel	Radio Archives	Emile C. Tepperman
2018	The Army Without a Country	Fiction	Novel	Radio Archives	Emile C. Tepperman
2018	The Bloody Frontiers	Fiction	Novel	Radio Archives	Emile C. Tepperman
2018	The Coming of the Mongol Hordes	Fiction	Novel	Radio Archives	Emile C. Tepperman
2018	The Siege That Brought the Black Death	Fiction	Novel	Radio Archives	Emile C. Tepperman
2018	Revolt of the Devil Men	Fiction	Novel	Radio Archives	Emile C. Tepperman

=== The Captain Future Series ===
Year	Title	Genre	Subject	Publisher	Author
2016	The Space Emperor	Fiction	Novel	Radio Archives	Edmond Hamilton
2016	Calling Captain Future	Fiction	Novel	Radio Archives	Edmond Hamilton
2016	Captain Future's Challenge	Fiction	Novel	Radio Archives	Edmond Hamilton
2016	The Triumph of Captain Future	Fiction	Novel	Radio Archives	Edmond Hamilton
2016	The Seven Space Stones	Fiction	Novel	Radio Archives	Edmond Hamilton
2016	Star Trail to Glory	Fiction	Novel	Radio Archives	Edmond Hamilton
2016	Magician of Mars	Fiction	Novel	Radio Archives	Edmond Hamilton
2017	The Lost World of Time	Fiction	Novel	Radio Archives	Edmond Hamilton
2017	Quest Beyond the Stars	Fiction	Novel	Radio Archives	Edmond Hamilton
2017	Outlaws of the Moon	Fiction	Novel	Radio Archives	Edmond Hamilton
2017	The Comet King	Fiction	Novel	Radio Archives	Edmond Hamilton
2017	Planets in Peril	Fiction	Novel	Radio Archives	Edmond Hamilton
2017	The Face of the Deep	Fiction	Novel	Radio Archives	Edmond Hamilton
2017	Worlds to Come	Fiction	Novel	Radio Archives	Brett Sterling
2017	The Star of Dread	Fiction	Novel	Radio Archives	Brett Sterling
2017	Magic Moon	Fiction	Novel	Radio Archives	Brett Sterling
2017	Days of Creation	Fiction	Novel	Radio Archives	Brett Sterling
2017	Red Sun of Danger	Fiction	Novel	Radio Archives	Brett Sterling
2017	Outlaw World	Fiction	Novel	Radio Archives	Edmond Hamilton
2017	The Solar Invasion	Fiction	Novel	Radio Archives	Manly Wade Wellman

=== Educational/Explainer ===
Year	Title	Genre	Subject	Publisher	Author
2012-2016	64 Healthcare Information Technology Training Modules	Educational	Audio	United States Department of Health and Human Services	Dr. Eta S. Berner

== Works Written by Milton Bagby ==
Year	Title	Genre	Subject	Publisher	Author
1998	Private Soldiers and Public Heroes	Non-Fiction	US Civil War	Rutledge Hill Press	Milton Bagby
2006	Frank Lloyd Wright's Rosenbaum House	Non-Fiction	Architecture	Pomegranate Press	Milton Bagby
2011	The Orphan (Rick Burkhart #1)	Fiction	Detective	CreateSpace/KDP	Milton Bagby
2012	Multi Platinum (Rick Burkhart #2)	Fiction	Detective	CreateSpace/KDP	Milton Bagby
2013	Playin' Possum	Fiction	Crime	Haunted Computer	Milton Bagby and Scott Nicholson
2014	Beg For Mercy	Fiction	Crime	CreateSpace/KDP	Milton Bagby
2015	Duck Hook (Russell Collins #1)	Fiction	Crime	CreateSpace/KDP	Milton Bagby
2016	Hotel/Motel	Fiction	Stage Play	CreateSpace/KDP	Milton Bagby
n/a	The Black Diamond	Fiction	Screenplay	Unpublished	Milton Bagby
n/a	First Lieutenant	Fiction	Screenplay	Unpublished	Milton Bagby

List of all works by Milton Bagby
