= Hydroman =

Publication information
- Publisher: Eastern Color Printing
- First appearance: Reg'lar Fellers Heroic Comics #1 (Aug. 1940)
- Created by: Bill Everett

In-story information
- Alter ego: Bob Blake
- Team affiliations: The Superpowers
- Partnerships: Rainbow Boy
- Notable aliases: Hydro
- Abilities: Shapeshifting; Ability to transform any part of his body into water

Hydroman is a superhero who first appeared in American comic books from Eastern Color Printing in 1940.

Created by Bill Everett, Hydroman first appeared in the premiere issue of Reg'lar Fellers Heroic Comics (August 1940).

== History ==
In Superhero Comics of the Golden Age, Mike Benton wrote:

Everett recalled that when a boyhood friend suggested the idea of Hydroman to him, I thought it was utterly preposterous. It was so ridiculous that I couldn't do anything with it. And he said, 'Why, sure! He could change himself into water, he can run through the sewers of New York and water mains. You could turn on the tap in the kitchen, and out comes Hydroman!" Steve Douglas, the editor of Heroic, liked the idea, and Everett came up with the first Hydroman story. I used the name Bob Blake for Hydroman's alter ego, because the guy that created the idea, his name was Bob. It was one way I could give him credit for giving me the story without having to pay him. His hero's last name, Blake, was taken from Everett's middle name".

Issue #14 (Sept. 1942) introduced Rainbow Boy, who would be Hydroman's sidekick. Hydroman's last appearance in this title was in issue #29 (March 1945).

In 2008, Hydroman appeared in the Dynamite Entertainment miniseries Project Superpowers; here he was referred to by the nickname "Hydro", possibly to avoid any conflicts with Marvel Comics who by now had a supervillain character called Hydro-Man.

== Fictional biography ==
In 1940, a young chemical engineer named Harry Thurston accidentally created a compound that could convert human flesh into water, and he spilled some on his hand. He called out to his friend Bob Blake, who was then accidentally doused with a large amount of the substance and turned completely into "living water". Harry found an antidote and poured it into Bob. Restored to human form, Bob soon discovered that he could now transform any part of his body into water and control its form and movement. Deciding to put his new abilities to good use, Bob became a costumed crimefighter and called himself Hydroman. Originally his outfit was shirtless, but later he wore a see-through shirt.

According to Jess Nevins' Encyclopedia of Golden Age Superheroes, "Hydroman defeats spies, an alien invasion led by the Great One, Yellow Perils, fifth columnists, the Phantom, the Alchemist, and the Native American murderer Black Bird".

Later, Hydroman gained a partner in the form of Jay Watson, a young employee of the Wizard Kid Radio Program. When exposed to sunlight, Jay could fly at the speed of light, leaving a rainbow-like trail in his wake which he could shape and control (much like Green Lantern's ring power). In his costumed identity of "Rainbow Boy", Jay worked with Hydroman and also went on solo adventures.

=== Project Superpowers ===
At some point after World War II, Hydroman and Rainbow Boy were each trapped and imprisoned in the mystical Urn of Pandora (along with scores of other heroes) by the misguided Fighting Yank. Decades later, the Urn was broken and the heroes freed. Hydroman found himself allied with a group of heroes called The Superpowers, who were determined to counteract the totalitarian actions and agenda of the current rulers of the world. Rainbow Boy, on the other hand, joined a group of kid heroes and sidekicks called The Inheritors, who are at odds with the adult heroes.

== Powers and abilities ==
After being doused with a chemical compound, Hydroman can transform any part of his body into water, and control its form and movement.
