= Secret Agent X =

Pulp magazine

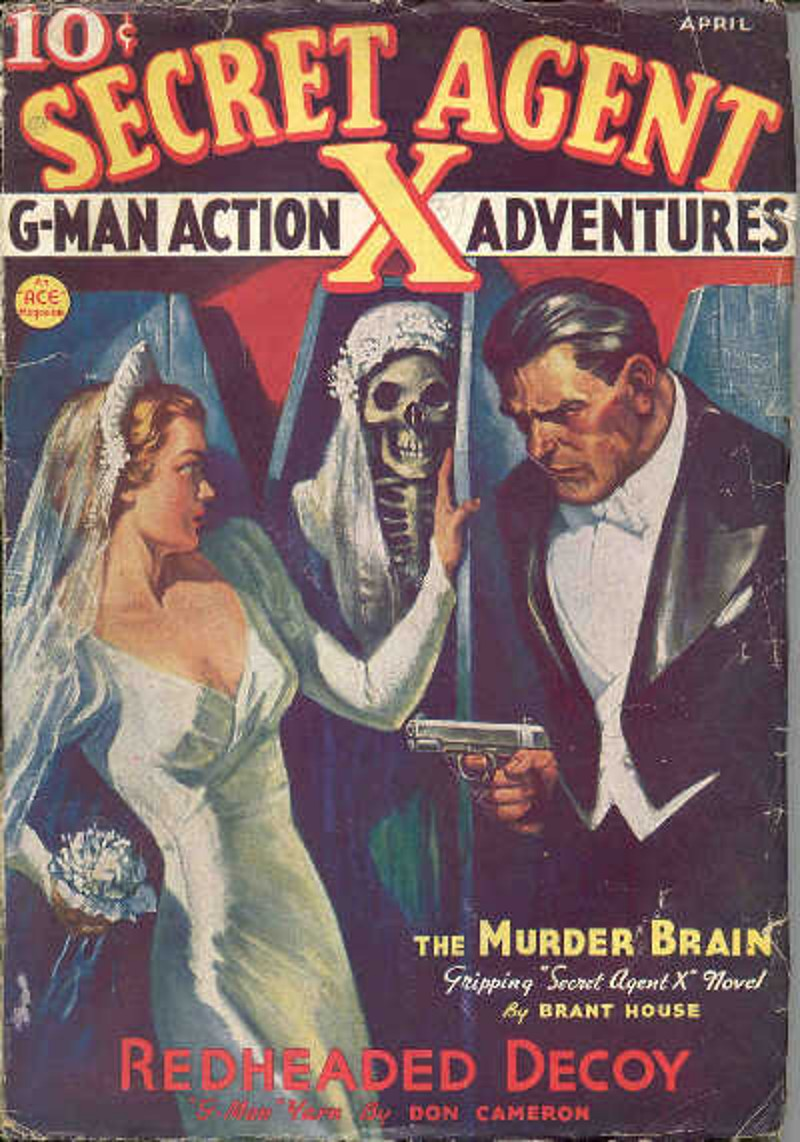
- Cover of "Secret Agent" Magazine for April 1937 showing inclusion of story about Secret Agent X.

Publication information
- Publisher: Ace Magazines
- First appearance: Secret Agent X #1
- Created by: Paul Chadwick

In-story information
- Alter ego: Unknown
- Supporting character of: Betty Dale; Jim Hobart; Harvey Bates; Thaddeus Penny
- Abilities: Genius-level intellect, expert knowledge of physical and biological sciences, master of hand-to-hand fighting (jiu-jitsu, boxing, and karate), master detective, master of disguise, ventriloquism, voice mimicry

Secret Agent X was the title of a U.S. pulp magazine published by A. A. Wyn's Ace Magazines, and the name of the main character featured in the magazine. The magazine ran for 41 issues between February 1934 and March 1939.

The Secret Agent X stories were written by more than one author, but they all appeared under the "house name" of Brant House. The first Secret Agent X story, The Torture Trust was written by Paul Chadwick, d. 1971, who went on to write at least fifteen others. Later stories were produced by G. T. Fleming-Roberts (born George Thomas Roberts, 1910-1968), Emile C. Tepperman (1899-1951) and Wayne Rogers (pen name of Archibald Bittner (1897-1966).

== Character ==
In the stories, the true identity of Secret Agent X is never revealed. He is a master of disguise, known as "the man of a thousand faces", who adopts several different identities in each story. Although he is a dedicated crime-fighter working undercover for the U.S. government, this is unknown to the police who consider him an outlaw. His true role is known only to newspaper reporter Betty Dale and his mysterious Washington controller, K-9. Agent X came close to being undone once by a woman who could recognise him no matter his disguise. She turned out to be blind and recognised his manner of walking.

Originally X was bank-rolled by an anonymous group of millionaires who made any amount of money he might need available. He maintained a number of identities and had bank-rolled a failing detective business into a thriving business where alongside their usual work, they did work for him, gathering news reports, getting information, leg work, guarding people, etc. They did not know his real identity. Later X became more of a mysterious government figure. His weapon of choice was a gas gun which quickly rendered people unconscious for a short time without any side effects.

Although ostensibly in the crime genre, the Secret Agent X stories were situated at the more far-fetched end of the spectrum, with a number of science fiction elements such as futuristic weapons and mad scientists. They were generally given highly sensational titles such as The Ambassador of Doom (May 1934), Servants of the Skull (November 1934), The Golden Ghoul (July 1935), Satan’s Syndicate (August 1937) and Curse of the Crimson Horde (September 1938). There were a number of similarities between Secret Agent X and other pulp heroes of the time such as The Shadow, the Green Lama and Operator No. 5. Authors such as Tepperman and Rogers produced stories for Operator No. 5 magazine as well as for Secret Agent X.

Ace Comics also published a short-lived character based on Secret Agent X, but called him "X- The Phantom Fed". All stories were based on early novels.

== Stories ==
1. The Torture Trust, 02/01/34 01/1 - Paul Chadwick
2. The Spectral Stranglers, 03/01/34 - Paul Chadwick
3. The Death-Torch Terror, 04/01/34 - Paul Chadwick
4. The Ambassador of Doom, 05/01/34 - Paul Chadwick
5. City of Living Dead, 06/01/34 - Emile C. Tepperman
6. Octopus of Crime, 09/01/34 - Paul Chadwick
7. The Hooded Hordes, 10/01/34 - Paul Chadwick
8. Hand of Horror, 08/01/34 - Emile C Tepperman
9. Servants of the Skull, 11/01/34 - Emile C Tepperman
10. The Murder Monster, 12/01/34 - Emile C Tepperman
11. Talons of Terror, 04/01/35 - Emile C Tepperman
12. Sinister Scourge, 01/01/35 - Paul Chadwick
13. Curse of the Waiting Death, 02/01/35 - Paul Chadwick
14. Devils of Darkness, 03/01/35 - Paul Chadwick
15. The Corpse Cavalcade, 05/01/35 - G. T. Fleming-Roberts
16. The Golden Ghoul, 07/01/35 - G. T. Fleming-Roberts
17. The Monarch of Murder, 08/01/35 - Paul Chadwick
18. Legion of the Living Dead, 09/01/35 - Paul Chadwick
19. Horde of the Damned, 10/01/35 - Paul Chadwick
20. Ringmaster of Doom, 11/01/35 - G. T. Fleming-Roberts
21. Kingdom of Blue Corpses, 12/01/35 - Paul Chadwick?
22. Brand of the Metal Maiden, 01/01/36 - G. T. Fleming-Roberts
23. Dividends of Doom, 02/01/36 - G. T. Fleming-Roberts
24. The Fear Merchants, 03/01/36 - Paul Chadwick
25. Faceless Fury, 04/01/36 - G. T. Fleming-Roberts
26. Subterranean Scourge, 06/01/36 - G. T. Fleming-Roberts
27. The Doom Director, 08/01/36 - G. T. Fleming-Roberts
28. Horror's Handclasp, 10/01/36 - G. T. Fleming-Roberts
29. City of Madness, 12/01/36 - G. T. Fleming-Roberts
30. Death's Frozen Formula, 02/01/37 - G. T. Fleming-Roberts
31. The Murder Brain, 04/01/37 - G. T. Fleming-Roberts
32. Slaves of the Scorpion, 06/01/37 - G. T. Fleming-Roberts
33. Satan's Syndicate, 08/01/37 - G. T. Fleming-Roberts
34. The Assassin's League, 10/01/37 - G. T. Fleming-Roberts
35. Plague of the Golden Death, 12/01/37 - G. T. Fleming-Roberts
36. Curse of the Mandarin's Fan, 02/01/38 - G. T. Fleming-Roberts
37. Claws of the Corpse Cult, 04/01/38 - G. T. Fleming-Roberts
38. The Corpse that Murdered, 06/01/38 - G. T. Fleming-Roberts
39. Curse of the Crimson Horde, 09/01/38 - Paul Chadwick
40. Corpse Contraband, 12/01/38 - G. T. Fleming-Roberts
41. Yoke of the Crimson Coterie, 03/01/39 - G. T. Fleming-Roberts?

== Reprints and new stories ==
Several Secret Agent X novels have been reprinted over the years. In the 1960s, at the height of the camp craze and the success of the Doc Savage reprints, Corinth Press (an imprint of soft porn publisher Regency) issued seven Secret Agent X adventures in paperback. Their low distribution made them collector's items almost from the very first, but didn't generate enough sales to continue the series. Since then, several other small presses have reprinted different stories. Small press Altus Press has begun an ambitious reprinting of the entire Secret Agent "X" series in nine volumes. All nine volumes have appeared.

Beginning in 1996 Secret Agent X became the latest in a series of pulp heroes to be revived. In Tom Johnson's short story "Horror's Monster", published in Classic Pulp Fiction Stories #9, Agent X's saga moved into the early days of World War II. Here he squared off against criminals who employed giant spiders to achieve their nefarious ends. Since publication of Johnson's tale, Stephen Payne has penned three novels starring the Secret Agent: The Freezing Fiends (CPFS #12-17), Master of Madness (Double Danger Tales #1-3), and Halo of Horror (Double Danger Tales #21-23), all appearing under the aegis of Tom Johnson's Fading Shadows books. Halo of Horror and Master of Madness has since been reprinted in a pulp facsimile format by Altus Press.

Altus Press has also published other Secret Agent X material: The Stolen Formula, a rewrite of a Secret Agent X story written specifically for the Greek audience and published in their "magazine" Triple Detective #1, and published a revised and updated The Secret Agent X Companion, a comprehensive history of the character by Tom Johnson and Will Murray.

In addition, Wild Cat Books issued two collections of novellas showcasing the Agent; Secret Agent X Volumes 1 & 2. These were edited by pulp historian/writer, Ron Fortier and are currently Airship 27 Productions and published by Cornerstone Books Publisher. It is a continuing series of all new stories with future volumes in production. The third, fourth, and fifth volumes have already appeared, with Frank Schildiner's take on the hero as the cover tale. Airship 27 has since put brought out seven volumes in print of new stories.

Stephen Payne wrote a fourth new Secret Agent X novel, The Resurrection Ring, which revealed new facts about the origin of the Man of a Thousand Faces. It also starred some old friends and even an old enemy who had not been featured since the 1930s. Altus Press released it in Summer 2014, at Pulpfest. More recently, Payne has completed his fifth novel of the Secret Agent, League of the Seventh Son. Set in New Orleans in 1932, it showcases an adventure from before the Agent's recorded career, wherein the Man of a Thousand Faces battles the terrible Mister Seven, a variant of an ancient European legend. In addition it shows the specific reason that Agent X faked his own death, in order to become a nameless, faceless crime-buster. The novel was released in 2017. Payne is also writing his sixth novel, Agents of Apollyon. In this crossover tale set in 1938, X battles a 19th-century villain who has somehow survived to the 20th century. In the process the character has gained a deadly weapon with which he can bring the entire world to its knees. Payne will follow this novel with The Satan of the Sky, wherein the Agent faces an airborne menace in 1940 Phoenix. Future tales will include a pair of Cold War adventures: Fear's Flotilla and Time of the Terrible People. Also Payne is working on the outline for a story tentatively entitled Silence for Sale. In it the Man of a Thousand Faces will battle the Man of Silence, a weird villain who does not speak, but uses a form of sign language to communicate with his underlings.

Age of Adventure published a full-length Secret Agent X novel set during World War II, The Sea Wraiths by Sean Ellis. This has been reprinted by Retrograde Press recently.

== See also ==
- Science fiction magazine
- Fantasy fiction magazine
- Horror fiction magazine
