= Vulcan (Ace Comics) =

Comic character

Vulcan the Volcanic Man is a superhero from the Golden Age of Comic Books. He first appeared in Super-Mystery Comics #1, published by Ace Comics in July 1940. His creator is unknown, but some of his stories were written by Otto Binder, with Maurice Gutwirth and Jack Alderman illustrating.

Vulcan is the descendant of the Roman god of Fire, born in a volcano in the South Sea Islands. His powers include fire manipulation, flight, super-strength, and invulnerability. The character appeared in Super-Mystery Comics #1-14, and also in Ace's team book, Four Favorites #1-4.

According to Jess Nevins' Encyclopedia of Golden Age Superheroes, Vulcan "fights arsonists, costumed criminals looking to profit from drought, Nazis, and the Man of a Thousand Faces". In one issue, he visited Berlin and burned off Adolf Hitler's mustache.

He last appeared in 1942. When the company went out of business, the hero fell into the public domain.
