= Lash Lightning =

Publication information
- Publisher: Ace Comics
- First appearance: Sure-Fire Comics #1 (June 1940)

In-story information
- Alter ego: Robert Morgan
- Team affiliations: The Super-Mysterymen
- Partnerships: Lightning Girl
- Notable aliases: Flash Lightning, Lightning
- Abilities: Super-strength, super-speed, flight, limited invulnerability; able to generate electricity, radiate heat, and track Lightning Girl

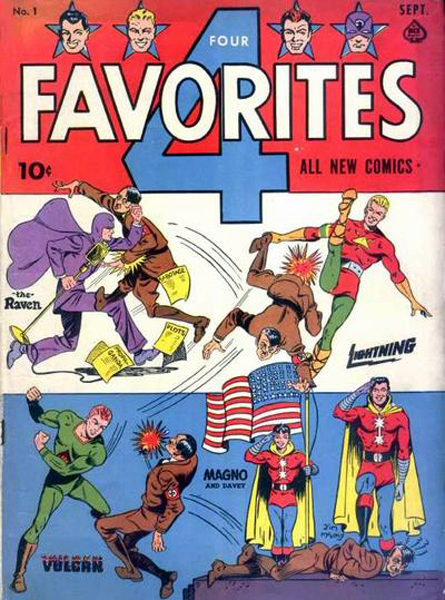
Cover of Four Favourites in September 1941

Lash Lightning is a superhero who first appeared in Sure-Fire Comics #1 (June 1940) from Ace Comics, which was renamed Lightning Comics with issue #4 to take advantage of the new character's popularity. Originally called Flash Lightning, the character's name was changed to Lash Lightning in issue #7 to avoid confusion with DC Comics' the Flash.

Lightning Comics ended with issue #13 in June 1942. In this final issue, he was joined by a sidekick, Lightning Girl.

Lash also appeared in issues #1 to 22 (Sept 1941 – March 1946) of the Ace title Four Favorites; about halfway through this run the "Lash" was dropped and he was simply named Lightning. Lightning Girl joined him in issue #6.

== Fictional biography ==
=== Ace ===
In 1940, explorer Robert Morgan is delving into an Egyptian pyramid when he encounters an ancient mystic called The Old Man of the Pyramids. The mystic teaches Morgan ancient secrets, and gives him the Amulet of Annihilation, on the condition that he uses his powers to fight evil.

Morgan's powers include super-strength, super-speed, flight, the ability to generate electricity and radiate "lightning heat" and a measure of invulnerability (e.g., he can contain the explosion of a grenade with his bare hands); his powers can be recharged by electricity. Returning to the United States, Morgan dons a costume and changes his name to Lash Lightning (as opposed to maintaining a secret identity). His emblem is a triangle with a thunderbolt emerging from each of its three sides.

His early foes include the Mummy, an insane college professor wrapped in bandages infused with radium, and the mad scientist Mastermind. His recurring villains also include a werewolf, the zombie-raising Dr. Diablo, and the Maestro, who wears a bee costume.

Later, Lash's friend Isobel Blake gains powers identical to his when he accidentally charges her with thousands of volts of electricity; she dons a costume similar to his and becomes his partner, Lightning Girl. The two of them are able to track each other via their “lightning impulses.”

=== Project Superpowers ===
At some point after World War II, both Lash Lightning and Lightning Girl were imprisoned in the mystical Urn of Pandora, along with many other heroes, by the misguided Fighting Yank; decades later, the Urn was broken and the heroes released. The duo were then recruited, along with six other heroes (including Magno and Davey Captain Courageous, Mr. Raven, Soldier Unknown), and The Sword, to form a team called The Super-Mysterymen; the purpose of this team has not yet been revealed.

=== Living Legends ===
Lightning Girl is one of the sixteen heroes to have hopped sixty years into the future in the pages of the Metahuman Press serial Living Legends. She was the only one of the characters to return to college in an attempt to regain a normal life, but the return of a still-young Robert Morgan has complicated matters in the still-ongoing serial.

== Revival ==
In 2008, Lash Lightning and Lightning Girl appeared in flashback in Dynamite Entertainment’s Project Superpowers #0; in the one-shot Project Superpowers: Chapter Two Prelude, they appear in this line as part of a team called The Super-Mysterymen (presumably named after the Ace title Super-Mystery Comics).
