= Unknown Soldier (Ace Comics) =

The Unknown Soldier
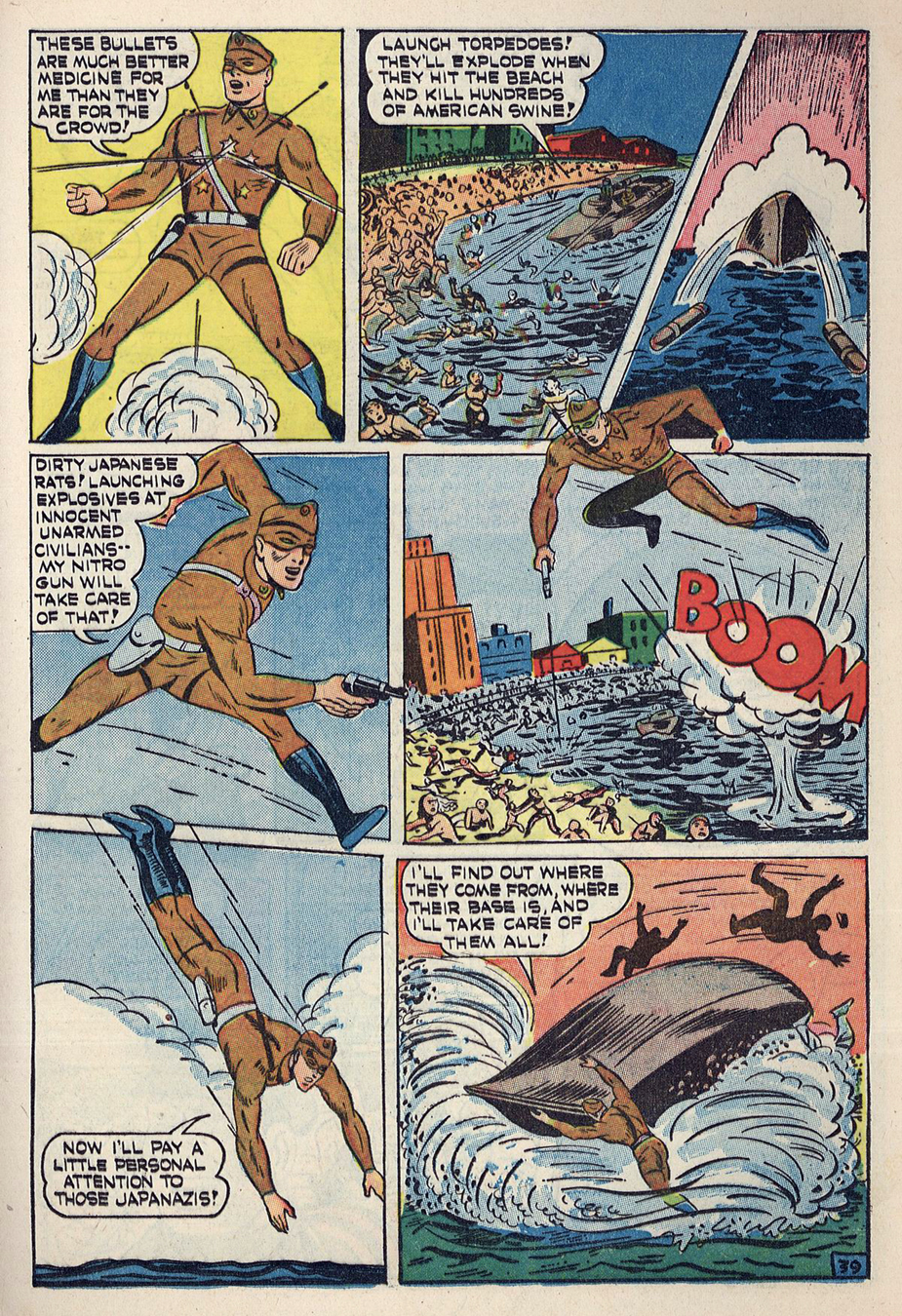
- Four Favorites #18, December 1942.

Publication information
- Publisher: Ace Comics
- First appearance: Our Flag Comics #1 (August 1941)

In-story information
- Team affiliations: The Super-Mysterymen
- Notable aliases: Soldier Unknown
- Abilities: Flight, super-strength; armed with a "nitro gun" that fires explosive rounds.

The Unknown Soldier is a superhero who first appeared in Our Flag Comics #1 (August 1941) from Ace Comics. The comic was devoted to patriotic superheroes, and also included Captain Victory and the Three Cheers.

== Publishing history ==
Our Flag Comics only lasted for five issues — the last issue was dated April 1942 — but by then the Unknown Soldier was transferred to the Ace title Four Favorites, appearing from issue #4 (March 1942) to #20 (November 1945). After that, he fell into the public domain.

In 2008, the character appeared in the second volume of the Dynamite Entertainment one-shot Project Superpowers: Chapter Two Prelude, now renamed Soldier Unknown, to avoid trademark hassles with DC Comics, as part of a team of Ace heroes called The Super-Mysterymen (named after the defunct Ace title Super-Mystery Comics).

== Fictional biography ==
=== Ace Comics ===
The Unknown Soldier is a mysterious being who claims to be the physically manifested spirit of all who died to protect the United States; during World War II, he came to the aid of American soldiers whenever they needed his help. He wears a costume patterned after a U.S. soldier's uniform (complete with garrison cap) and a mask; he possesses super-strength and the ability to fly, and he carries a "nitro gun" that fires explosive bullets. In his first story, he defeats Adolf Hitler.

According to Jess Nevins' Encyclopedia of Golden Age Superheroes, "the Unknown Soldier shows up wherever things look worst for democracy, whether that involves fighting bank robbers who use invisible ink and a special suit to turn invisible, cold-wielding villains like the Icicle, or Nazi mad scientists like Dr. Oxyo".

=== Project Superpowers ===
At some point after the war, the Soldier was trapped in the mystical Urn of Pandora by the misguided Fighting Yank, along with dozens of other heroes; decades later, the Urn was broken and the prisoners freed. The Soldier and seven other heroes — Captain Courageous, Lash Lightning & Lightning Girl, Mr. Raven, The Sword, Magno, and Vulcan — were then recruited by unknown forces to form a team called The Super-Mysterymen; what part they play in the modern world is not revealed.
