= Project Superpowers =

Comic book limited series

- Promotional image by Alex Ross.

Publication information
- Publisher: Dynamite Entertainment
- Schedule: Monthly
- Format: Limited series
- Genre: Superhero
- Publication date: (vol. 1); January–October 2008 (vol. 2); June 2009 – September 2010 (Vol.3); July 2018 January – 2019
- No. of issues: (vol. 1); 9 (vol. 2); 12 (vol.3); 7

Creative team
- Created by: Jim Krueger; Alex Ross
- Written by: Jim Krueger
- Artist(s): Alex Ross (co-plotter and covers)
- Penciller: Doug Klauba
- Inker: Stephen Sadowski
- Letterer: Simon Bowland
- Colorist: Adrian Moreno

Collected editions
- Hardcover: ISBN 1-933305-91-6
- Softcover: ISBN 1606900145

Project Superpowers is a comic book limited series published by Dynamite Entertainment beginning January 2008. It was co-plotted by Jim Krueger and Alex Ross, with scripts by Jim Krueger, covers by Alex Ross, and interior art by Doug Klauba and Stephen Sadowski for issue #0, and Carlos Paul for the remainder of the series. Ross is also art director, which includes sketched pages, color guides, and redesigns of most of the characters. There was a new series in 2018 with Rob Williams as the writers and Sergio Davila as the artist. A new series called Project Superpowers: Fractured States will debut in April with writers Ron Marz, Andy Lanning and artist Emilio Utrera. Another series called Scarlett Sisters with Women in Red, Lady Satan and Miss Masque is scheduled for September 2022.

The series resurrects a number of Golden Age superheroes originally published by companies including Fox Comics, Crestwood Publications, and Nedor Comics, many of whom are in the public domain, including the protagonist, Fighting Yank.

== Setting ==
The story is set in a present-day world that is different from our own; it is implied that the absence of the world's heroes allowed the United States to become a virtual dictatorship, with the Dynamic Forces corporation manipulating world events for the sake of order and profit. The Police Corps consists of armored officers who show no mercy, wars are being waged for nothing more than business reasons, and even free speech is heavily restricted. In addition to all this, a terrorist movement called "The Claw" (which may or may not be related to the Golden Age villain of the same name) is active around the world. It is into this setting that the released heroes first emerge.

== Plot ==
=== Chapter One ===
==== "Last Gleaming" (issue #0) ====
Bruce Carter III, formerly the World War II-era hero Fighting Yank, is now an elderly man. As he sits quietly in his home, thinking and wrestling with his regrets, he's confronted by an apparition. Carter mistakes the ghost for that of his colonial-era ancestor, a spirit which guided and advised him throughout his WWII adventures. The ghost, shrouded in an American flag, is instead an amalgamation of the spirits of patriots, heroes, and martyrs who fought and died for their country. The apparition has come to accuse Carter of betrayal and warn him of his impending death. Carter flees from The American Spirit (for that is the name of this Dickensian apparition). Through a series of flashback sequences, Fighting Yank's WWII backstory is explored. In a meeting between an unidentified general, Fighting Yank, Green Lama, Black Terror, The Flame, and "Big Blue" (1), it is revealed that Adolf Hitler has come into possession of a mystical object which is the original source of all the world's evil: Pandora's Box (actually an urn) described in the ancient Greek myth. Bruce Carter in his guise as The Fighting Yank, is tasked by the U.S. Government to parachute into Nazi Germany and steal the urn. Pandora's urn introduced evil into the world, but also released hope; while the Axis powers are the representatives of that evil, the 1940s "mystery men" are conversely the embodiment of hope. The mystical creatures released when the urn was opened are visible as physical entities when special goggles (invented by Alan Oppenheimer and other atomic scientists) are worn. Yank puts on the goggles and is immediately attacked by the creatures. After he removes the goggles, Yank's "spirit guide" (the ghost of his colonial-era ancestor, Bruce Carter I) tells him that since hope was the last thing released from the urn the only way to reimprison its evil is to first trap his fellow mystery men within it.

Fighting Yank attempts to convince his allies to enter the urn voluntarily, but they refuse. Carter determines to imprison them one at a time. Three days after the bombing of Hiroshima, the mystery men are in Kokura, Japan, the intended target of the second atomic bomb. Their purpose is to stop the bombing by obtaining a Japanese surrender. Instead of surrendering, the Japanese army attacks the heroes, resulting in a large-scale battle. The U.S. military, in the mistaken belief that the resulting dust and debris are cloud cover obscuring the city, switch the target city to Nagasaki. Meanwhile, Carter takes advantage of the confusion to trap The Flame within the urn; it was necessary to imprison The Flame first as his power would help the other mystery men survive within the urn.

The Flame is presumed killed, ironically, by the fires of Kokura. The Fighting Yank imprisons Flame Girl after The Flame's memorial service. In the years following World War II, Carter continues to imprison his fellow mystery men, one by one, including the newer heroes which spring up after the war. One of the few heroes to escape this fate is The Green Lama, who returned to Tibet immediately after The Flame's memorial.

Now, in Carter's twilight years, The American Spirit has come to indict Carter for this betrayal. Carter's ancestor arrives to argue with The American Spirit, to convince Carter that he did indeed do the right thing. The patriotic apparition counters with a catalogue of the world's ills which have occurred since the mystery men were imprisoned in the urn: the rise of Dynamic Forces, a mega-corporation that plays on the world's greed and sloth by offering material creature comforts to the masses; a fascist police forces that cows the population and keeps them in line; a zombie army made from the decomposing bodies of America's dead military men, sent to the Middle East to fight on the government's behalf, forced to battle and be reconstructed over and over endlessly, while the soldiers' souls languish in limbo. The American Spirit argues: "How can you say you've done anything to stop or contain evil?...All you've done...is to stop those who might have helped keep this from happening".

Carter makes his decision. He asks The American Spirit what he must do to make amends. The answer lies in Tibet; despite his advanced age, Carter must journey there and seek counsel from The Green Lama, even though Carter suspects that Green Lama will kill him for what he's done.

==== "The Rumors of My Demise..." (issue #1) ====
In New York City, atop the Dynamic Forces skyscraper headquarters, Dynamic Man and Dynamic Woman look down upon the city. Godlike, they regard humanity as little more than the ants they appear to be from atop their glass and steel eyrie. As Bruce Carter, the former Fighting Yank, struggles through the snows of Tibet, he is beginning to realize that he has been badly misled by the ghost of his ancestor and namesake, that his ancestor might well be a traitor with his own hidden agenda. Reaching Shangri-La, Carter is greeted by Tsarong, Green Lama's manservant, who takes him to his master. Jethro "Jet" Dumont, the Green Lama, who has apparently not aged since the 1940s, greets Carter warmly. Carter confesses to Lama that he's trapped all of their former allies inside Pandora's Urn, and is surprised by Lama's nonchalance at the revelation.

Lama explains to Carter and The American Spirit that he's discovered the power of the "meta-natural" world. It has provided him with new abilities, one of which he immediately demonstrates. Leafy vines suddenly spring up from the ground and engulf the trio; when the vines peel away, they find themselves in New York City. The American Spirit tells Carter that Pandora's Urn will be found in the possession of Dynamic Man, a former ally who, like the Green Lama, wasn't "chosen" to be trapped in the urn.

At Dynamic Forces headquarters, Carter and Green Lama are ushered into the presence of the Dynamic Family who, like Jet Dumont, have also not aged. Dynamic Man is the caretaker of numerous artifacts, mystical and otherwise, left over from the dark days of World War II. Lama asks if Carter may see the urn. Dynamic Man makes to hand the urn to Carter but deliberately drops it instead. With surprising agility for one so elderly, Carter makes a diving catch. Carter himself breaks the urn open and is surprised when nothing happens. Dynamic Man laughs as he informs the duo that he'd had the urn exorcised, while Dynamic Woman hints that the Family may be something more/other than human. Then the Family members grab Carter and Green Lama and throw them down an elevator shaft, despite the fact that the Lama can fly. The elevator car, its cables cut, hurtles down at them; Lama smashes through it and the heroes exit onto the rooftop. Carter puts on his power cloak and mask to again become The Fighting Yank.

The Dynamic Family attacks the heroes on the rooftop, while hundreds of Dynamic Forces employees rush into the fray. Suddenly another mystery man bursts through the rooftop and comes to the aid of Yank and Lama. He is The Black Terror, who has determined that no one but he should have the privilege of killing The Fighting Yank as revenge for Terror's decades-long imprisonment in the urn. During the fight, Black Terror accidentally punches Dynamic Man too hard and discovers, to everyone's surprise, that Dynamic Man is actually a robot. The robot responds by hurling Black Terror from the rooftop. Cat-like, Black Terror lands on his feet on the sidewalk below, cratering it in the process. The Terror then shakes his fist at the rooftop and howls in rage: "OK, Bruce, Fighting Yank gets a reprieve – I'm not going to kill you until after I kill Dynamic Man!"

==== "...The Whites of Their Eyes" (issue #2) ====
Mystery men of the 1940s, released from Pandora's Urn, are popping up all over the globe. A red-and-blue clad, boomerang wielding figure emerges from the fabled sewers of Paris in time to see a street riot in progress.

Meanwhile, in New York City, the Fighting Yank and the Green Lama fight for their lives against the robotic Dynamic Family and their mechanical hordes. The Black Terror claws his way back up the side of the skyscraper and rejoins the fray, but seems just as concerned with the fate of his kid sidekick Tim (Kid Terror) as he does with the struggle at hand. Now that they know their opponents are robots instead of flesh and blood, the heroes battle with furious abandon. With a massive rumbling, huge trees and vines suddenly sprout from the heart of the Dynamic Forces headquarters; the Green Lama is using his meta-natural abilities to transport himself and his allies away from the lopsided fight.

In Paris, the mysterious stranger saves a law enforcement officer from the rioters, taking down a few members of the mob in the process. After their escape it's revealed that the officer is a woman who identifies the mob as a group of terrorists and herself as Justine. The stranger remains ever silent.

Back in Shangri-La after their escape from the Dynamic Family, the heroes discuss what they've experienced. The American Spirit is of the belief that the urn's destruction has released the imprisoned mystery men who are likely to reappear randomly around the globe. The Black Terror continues to threaten Fighting Yank's life, while the ghostly Bruce Carter I continues to try to sway his descendant away from The American Spirit.

War is being waged in the Middle East. The United States has replaced its traditional human soldiers with the F-Troop: the reanimated corpses of soldiers killed in previous wars. The war's goal is to destroy the world's petroleum source, which will prompt industrialized nations to switch to a new synthetic fuel created and monopolized by Dynamic Forces. Not coincidentally, Dynamic Forces also controls the U.S. military and is fighting the war with the undead F-Troop soldiers which are also Dynamic's patented creation. Acting as a pair of thorns in Dynamic's side are the heroes Samson (possessed of superhuman strength and the ability to repel ballistic missiles) and The Scarab (clad in powered stealth armor), who meet and join forces to battle the F-Troop.

The Flame appears in Hollywood, California; disoriented and frantic to find Flame Girl (Linda), he accidentally sets the famous "Hollywood" sign on fire with his flame pistol. In Shangri-La, Black Terror, also frantic to find his old sidekick, argues with The American Spirit and decks Fighting Yank. In New York, the Dynamic Family is unable to destroy the meta-natural greenery that has overrun their skyscraper; they've called on The Crusaders to deal with the returned heroes.

==== "Proof Through the Night" (issue #3) ====
Shangri-La is under attack. The Crusaders, a U.S. military strike force (under the control of the Dynamic Family) is flying in en masse to destroy buildings, kill citizens, and essentially level the city. Led to the scene by Dynamic Forces micro-transmitters which were secretly placed on Black Terror's uniform, the Crusaders wreak havoc as the vastly outnumbered heroes (Green Lama, Black Terror, and Fighting Yank) struggle to stop them.

In a Middle Eastern bazaar, Samson tells Scarab the tale of how he lost his eyes. Samson was among the heroes who'd gone on a peace mission to Kokura, Japan, a mission gone horribly wrong. Kokura had been slated as the target of the second atomic bomb in 1945, so the costumed mystery men travelled there to convince the Japanese to surrender before the bomb could be dropped. The mission instead became a battle which created so much smoke and dust that the U.S. military switched the bomb's target to Nagasaki instead. Samson flew off from Kokura to intercept the bombing mission. Arriving too late to prevent the bomb's deployment, Samson is caught in the air burst and the blast literally melts his eyes.

In Paris, the mute mystery man uses a pad and pencil to introduce himself to his new ally Justine, a French law enforcement anti-terrorism operative. On the pad, he writes the word "Devil".

More heroes released from the urn are popping up around the globe. In California, The Flame runs to the seashore, leaving a path of burning devastation in his wake. Placing his flame pistol to his head, he's about to commit suicide when a sudden tidal wave hits the beach and stops him. The wave is caused by his old friend Hydro who has also recently been released from the urn.

The scene shifts to Asia, where a disoriented, amnesiac Masquerade wanders the streets of a town in which the residents have been afflicted by a mysterious plague. There she encounters her former ally and lover V-Man, who is apparently the plague's unwitting source; just after they meet, Masquerade's face breaks out in angry red boils.

Mr. Face and a nameless companion sit drinking in a Mexican cantina. In the 1940s, Mr. Face was just an unpowered adventurer in a fright mask, but his time in the urn has transformed him (as it did many of his fellow mystery men): now his mask causes others to experience their worst fears. As the village's inhabitants run screaming through the streets outside, Mr. Face and his drinking buddy confess their own worst fears. The nameless companion fears falling "off the wagon" back into alcoholism. Mr. Face's fear has already come true: he can't remove the mask.

In Shangri-La, the fight is going badly for the heroes. The city is dying; snow falls in Shangri-La for the first time in thousands of years. Green Lama's friend and manservant Tsarong is fried by a Crusader ray blast, while another Crusader burns a gaping hole in Fighting Yank's chest (which matches the hole Black Terror punched in the chest of Dynamic Man). Yank's power cloak keeps him alive, but he's left behind as Green Lama uses one of his meta-natural "leaf piles" to transport the heroes back to New York. After the departure Fighting Yank falls face first into the snow as The American Spirit flutters down and covers him like a star-spangled shroud.

==== "...Undimmed by Human Tears" (issue #4) ====
Dynamic Forces' headquarters (and all of New York City) has been overrun by Green Lama's meta-natural foliage. The Dynamic Family abandons New York and relocates to Philadelphia. While there, they see the television coverage of the destruction inadvertently caused by The Flame and Hydro. The recently released heroes are bombarded by media questions (including "Are you a couple?"; it would seem that many things have changed over the sixty years of their imprisonment within Pandora's Urn). Dynamic Man decides to change his strategy for combating the heroes; he will call out the nationwide Police Corp, a fascistic cadre of stormtroopers, and use them to manipulate the media, making martyrs of the Dynamic Family.

Shangri-La has been destroyed. The Crusaders carry the Fighting Yank through the snow, while Yank's spirit guide realizes that he's lost and truly damned.

Green Lama has renamed New York City "New Shangri-La". His meta-natural greenery has taken over the city; huge vines and foliage wrap around the skyscrapers. Unable to remove the Dynamic Family's micro-transmitters from the Black Terror, Green Lama decides to send Black Terror across the globe to gather up the newly released superheroes as they appear and bring them back to New Shangri-La.

In the Middle East, Scarab shows Samson a "Black Cross" facility, where the undead F-Troop soldiers are reconstituted and sent back into battle. The political goal of using these zombie troops is to make war "acceptable" to the masses; Samson recognizes that the soldiers' souls are thereby trapped and that the F-Troop is an abomination. He charges through the tents and begins the work of destroying the undead soldiers, releasing their souls.

In Tibet, the dying Fighting Yank begins to understand how he was misled by his ancestor; it was never about "doing the right thing" but was instead about releasing Bruce Carter I's soul from the curse it labored under. Inspired by The American Spirit, who reassures Yank that his misguided betrayal of his allies has not damned him, Fighting Yank challenges his Crusader captors to "do their worst".

Events are moving too quickly even for the Dynamic Family. Communications have been cut with their Tibetan Crusader squadron, a Middle Eastern F-Troop unit has been totally destroyed (even beyond the ability to reanimate the corpses), and Black Terror's location is constantly changing as Green Lama sends him around the globe to gather together the reemerging heroes. Dynamic Woman muses: "How could one old man have started this?"

In Paris, the Death Defying 'Devil and Justine's "ad hoc" alliance is strengthened as 'Devil' learns of a terrorist organization called The Claw, and realizes there might be a connection with his old archenemy of the same name. Just then the Black Terror (accompanied by Masquerade and V-Man) arrives to gather up 'Devil'.

Back in California, The Flame and Hydro have given themselves up to the Police Corp, unaware of the organization's stormtrooper tactics. As the Police Corp begin to savagely beat the handcuffed heroes, Pyroman arrives to lend the heroes a hand. It's goes badly for the Corp when Dynamic Boy suddenly appears and lends the Corp a hand.

==== "Let Slip the Dogs of War" (issue #5) ====
After wiping out his Crusader captors, the Fighting Yank continues to argue with his ancestor's spirit; Yank has come to realize that his ancestor advised him to commit a hideous wrong for purely selfish reasons. The ghost says he's in Hell; Yank merely replies, "Good".

Dynamic Boy ambushes The Flame and Hydro. Pyroman arrives and electrocutes Dynamic Boy, apparently killing him (of course, the reader knows that Dynamic Boy is a robot). Just as the Police Corp prepare to attack the heroes, Black Terror appears in a riot of meta-natural greenery to whisk the trio away to New Shangri-La where they are greeted by the Green Lama (who believes Fighting Yank to be dead).

V-Man, unable to control his new "plague" power, is under quarantine in a plexiglass room. While there, Masquerade comes to visit him; it seems that removing her mask somehow cured her of the plague.

The Dynamic Family makes a televised media circus of Dynamic Boy's funeral. Dynamic Man accuses the superheroes of being "terrorists", while Dynamic Woman calls for the nations of the planet to unite for a war against the "Superpowers".

The Target, another released hero, makes an appearance. The Police Corp attempt to take him down, but his ability to split into three separate beings confuses the fascist troops.

In the Middle East, Black Terror joins with Samson and the Scarab in a brutal battle against F-Troop zombies. Black Terror indicates that the other Superpowers will likely join later in an effort to destroy the F-Troop abomination.

Back in Tibet, the Fighting Yank is slipping fast; only his power cloak is keeping him (barely) alive. Suddenly three arrows slam into the gaping wound in Yank's chest, fired by the Arrow, another hero released from the urn.

=== Wizard #½: All Part of the Design (issue #½) ===
In December 2008, Dynamite partnered with Wizard Magazine to produce a special #½ issue. The story takes place at Dynamic Boy's funeral (between issues #5 and #6 of the first series) and sees Dynamic Man reflecting on the past. Dynamic Man and Dynamic Boy in WWII Germany are admiring what Hitler has accomplished before playing the role of heroes when their super-powered allies arrive. Back in the present, Dynamic Boy emerges from his grave and the next part of the Dynamic Family's plan is revealed.

==== "...The Perilous Fight" (issue #6) ====
A flashback sequence shows Bruce Carter I during the American Revolution promising that he'd "be damned" if he failed to deliver a vital message. Stopping for a drink on his journey, Carter is ambushed and killed in the tavern by British soldiers who subsequently find the message he is carrying; Carter is indeed damned as a result. As it later transpires, Carter I's guidance of his descendant and namesake, the Golden Age hero known as The Fighting Yank, is some sort of atonement for his misdeed, but it seems that he's no more competent in death than he was in life. The Arrow's three shots appear to have been accidental, but also seem to be finishing off Yank.

In New Shangri-La, Masquerade visits the quarantined V-Man and informs him that her "possession" power will also allow her to recover from the plague he carries; she can freely enter his "bubble", but V-Man is so consumed with self-pity that he rejects her. More importantly, she informs V-Man that Green Lama intends to use him as a "secret weapon" should the need arise. Lama arrives to round up Masquerade, as the Superpowers are bound for the Middle East to help Samson and Scarab in their battle against the F-Troop.

Scarab, meanwhile, reveals his identity to Samson and tells of how he once sold a scarab-shaped stone he found, used the money to establish a financial empire, and then built the powered armor he now wears.

Dynamic Man appears before the shadowy cabal known as The Supremacy, petitioning them for full membership. Dynamic Forces has been working for The Supremacy, following their orders, but Dynamic Man believes the time has come for him to become a member instead of a pawn. The Supremacy rejects his request, but not before informing him that more F-Troop forces are being dispatched to the Middle East. The ground there is also being sown with a defoliating treatment that will prevent Green Lama's transportation powers from working; if the Superpowers appear there, they will be trapped.

The Superpowers prepare to leave for the Middle East, but Green Lama first tells the team what they are about to do and what to expect. The world's governments have become corrupt, and the Superpowers will need to operate without them, outside the law if needed. The team will likely be vilified by governments, in the press, and by the public. They vanish, reappearing in the Middle East in time to aid Scarab and Samson in their fight against (and efforts to save the souls of) the F-Troop forces there.

Meanwhile, American Spirit tells the dying Fighting Yank that his friends will die unless he saves them—by taking his ancestor's curse and damnation upon himself.

The Superpowers' battle is going badly. Heavily outnumbered by F-Troop forces (with more being airdropped), the team decides a retreat is in order. But Green Lama has collapsed; when he rises, he appears to have aged a half-century or more.

==== "...Throughout All the Land Unto All the Inhabitants Thereof..." (issue #7) ====
The battle between the Superpowers and F-Troop rages on. As more and more undead soldiers parachute down from the sky, the rapidly aging Green Lama tells Black Terror that "all of them" (the F-Troop) must arrive before Lama will spring a trap on them.

Fighting Yank chooses to accept his ancestor's curse in order to help his endangered teammates. His sole request of the American Spirit is that he would be able to keep his magical cloak so that he would be able to affect the world with more than just his words, a request which was granted. Wrapped in his cloak, the Fighting Yank dies.

As the members of The Supremacy watch remotely, the Superpowers continue to fight for their lives. On the verge of springing their "trap" (a mysterious figure covered in leaves), they suddenly discover that Green Lama is unable to transport them away. In desperation, Lama flies Masquerade up to one of the planes airdropping the F-Troop, where Masquerade uses her "possession" power on the pilot. She learns that The Supremacy has treated the ground with a chemical that neutralizes Lama's meta-natural powers and that they've been lured into a trap. Lama urges the heroes with flight powers to escape, but his teammates refuse to go. As the Superpowers prepare for death (and glory), Fighting Yank (or his spirit) appears; his cloak strengthens Green Lama who is then able to use his meta-natural abilities to transport the team to safety.

The mysterious leafed figure stays behind. Bursting forth from the greenery that protected the other Superpowers from his plague powers, V-Man springs Lama's "trap", walking impervious among the undead F-Troop soldiers and sending them to the final reward that they've previously been denied by Dynamic Forces' blasphemous reanimation technology.

With Green Lama as their spokesman, the Superpowers appear on television to address the public: "The nations of this world have grown corrupt with their own power...It is with this in mind that we shall become a check to balance the corruption of the nations of the world. You may call us terrorists, but we're not. We are Americans. And we are your friends".

The members of The Supremacy watch the broadcast and realize that the Superpowers have just declared war. Unknown to the heroes, one of their number is a Supremacy member: Amon Khadul, The Scarab.

Fighting Yank and Black Terror patch their differences as more heroes, responding to the worldwide broadcast, begin to arrive in New Shangri-La. The first on the scene is The Owl.

=== Free Comic Book Day Special ===
In May 2008, there was a Free Comic Book Day special edition of Project Superpowers released. In the story, which takes place after issue #7 of the first series, the heroes wonder if the Claw is still alive and reflect on 'Devil's history with him.

=== Chapter Two Prelude ===
Released in October 2008 as a teaser to Project Superpowers: Chapter Two, this one-shot showcases a number of drawings of heroes and groups who will presumably be featured in the next chapter. The groups are: "The Inheritors", led by the Boy King and his Giant, and composed of many of the young sidekicks of the heroes, including the Black Terror's sidekick, Tim; "The Patriots", a team of flag-wearing heroes who return to the service of the American government, and are mentioned to come into conflict with the Black Terror; "The Supremacy", a secret cabal who were introduced previously, who include a "President West", and numerous villain characters, plus the Scarab's secret identity; "The Scarlet Sisters", a team-up between Masquerade, the Woman in Red, and Lady Satan; "The Big Shots", a trio composed of Mr. Face, Skyman, and Marvelo, all of whose abilities are hinted to be dangerous and difficult to control; and "The Super-Mysterymen", a group of heroes who are said to have been tracked and captured immediately after the destruction of the urn to be used for an unknown party's purposes. Furthermore, several single heroes were shown, including: Captain Future, Cat-Man (now a partially feline character, called Man-Cat), Burning Eagle (who is constantly aflame), Black Owl (whose body now contains a black hole), Silver Streak, the Ghost, and a newly created hero pair, Truth and Dare, who are said to be inspired by the return of the Superpowers. Chapter Two Prelude also contains small previews of the Black Terror, Death Defying 'Devil, and Masquerade mini-series.

=== Chapter Two ===
Following the events of Project Superpowers and Black Terror, the members of The Supremacy decide to launch a nuclear assault on New Shangri-La; The Scarab, who is secretly a member of The Supremacy, informs The Superpowers of this, and they invade The Pentagon and abduct U.S. President Gene West (who is a former superhero called Power Nelson) before the attack begins. The Green Lama travels to the Supremacy's headquarters and warns them to leave America alone.

The Inheritors, disturbed by what they see as their adult partners running amok, decide to gather other heroes who've escaped from the Urn of Pandora in order to oppose the Superpowers. They find Cat-Man, who now acts like a feral beast, and The Eagle, who is now constantly burning from within.

Later, Captain Future—who is now possessed by Zeus, who had originally created the Urn—appears in the Caribbean, leading people to engage in drunken orgies with him and attacking anyone who opposes him; two new heroes called Truth and Dare try to fight him, and fail. The Superpowers try to get Captain Future under control, and they also fail. It turns out the Captain is working with The Supremacy, who have The Flame's partner Flame Girl prisoner; he steals her flame powers, and prepares to wage war on the Superpowers.

Meanwhile, Tim the Kid Terror is attacked by Cat-Man, who had broken out of his cage; the other Inheritors don't see that the gash in Tim's face reveals machinery. "Tim" is actually Dynamic Boy, who had killed Tim two months earlier in order to assume his identity.

=== Project Superpowers: Fractured States ===
A new series taking place in the future where most of the Project heroes are dead, with just one man that holds the key in figuring out what causes this

== Characters ==
The characters of Project Superpowers include:

- The American Spirit
- The Arrow (Ralph Payne)
- The Black Terror (Bob Benton)
- The Claw (now a multi-bodied terrorist organization)
- The Crusaders (soldiers with the same powers as the American Crusader)
- The Death-Defying 'Devil (Bart Hill)
- Dynamic Man (Bert McQuade)
- Dynamic Boy
- Dynamic Woman
- Fighting Yank (Bruce Carter III)
- The Flame (Gary Preston)
- The F-Troops (based on the design of Frankenstein's monster)
- Lady Satan
- Green Lama (Jethro "Jet" Dumont)
- Hydro (Bob Blake)
- Masquerade (Diana Adams)
- Mister Face (Tony Trent)
- The Owl (Nick Terry)
- Pyroman (Dick Martin)
- Samson
- The Scarab (Amon Khadul; loosely based on the Scarab from Nedor Comics)
- The Supremacy
- The Target (Niles Reed, Dave Brown, and Tom Foster)
- Woman in Red (Peggy Allen)

=== Character sketches ===
Issues #1–6 include a two-page layout in each issue, of Golden Age character sketches by Alex Ross and inLight Studio. Most of the layouts feature over a dozen characters each, some of whom now have altered names or nicknames to avoid trademark conflicts (e.g., "Hydro-Man" is now the name of a Spider-Man villain, so the original Hydroman is now called Hydro):

- Issue #1: Hydro (Hydroman), Fighting Yank, Silver Streak, Captain Future, the Woman in Red, the Target and the Targeteers, Cat (Cat-Man) and Kitten, the Owl, Strongman, Major Victory, and Dynamic Man and Dynamic Boy.
- Issue #2: The Green Mask and Domino, U.S. Jones, Blue Bolt, Sub-Zero Man, Captain Battle and Captain Battle, Jr., Death-Defying 'Devil (Daredevil), Black Terror and Tim, Amazing-Man, the Arrow, Vulcan, Pyroman, and the Liberator.
- Issue #3: Lash Lightning and Lightning Girl, Mr. Raven (The Raven), Unknown Soldier, the Sword, the Flag, the Green Lama, the American Crusader, the American Eagle, Skyman, Mr. Face (The Face), Marvelo, Captain Courageous, and the Super-American.
- Issue #4: The Flame and Flame Girl, "Big Blue" (Blue Beetle) and Sparky, Samson and David, V-Man and the V-Boys, Cyclone, Grim Reaper, Jack (Yellowjacket), Black Venus, the Hood, and Rocketman and Rocketgirl.
- Issue #5: The Green Giant, Phantasmo, the Boy King and his Giant, and the Claw.
- Issue #6: Man O' Metal, the Boy King, Golden Lad, Rainbow Boy, Airman, Radior, Man of War, the Black Owl, Yank & Doodle, Sparkman, Doc (Doc Strange), and the Dart and Ace.

The collected edition includes all of the above sketches, plus the Masked Marvel, Sky Wizard, Brad Spencer (Wonderman), Martan the Marvel Man and Vana, Professor Supermind and Son, and Power Nelson (the Futureman).

== Collected editions ==
Project Superpowers: Chapter One

In December 2008, the first series was released as a hardcover collected edition (ISBN 1933305916), in which a few minor corrections were made (i.e., the title to issue #5 was included, and Dynamic Man's name was correctly given as Bert McQuade instead of Curt Cowan). A trade paperback was released in May 2009 (ISBN 1606900145).

Project Superpowers: Chapter Two

The second series was collected into two trade paperback volumes:

- Volume 1 (collects issues #0–6), July 2009, ISBN 1-60690-134-6
- Volume 2 (collects issues #7–12), November 2010, ISBN 1-60690-184-2

In 2018 Project Superheroes had their first omnibus, in the following years after two more were printed:

- Project Superpowers Omnibus Vol 1: Dawn of Heroes TP (ISBN 1524107433)
  - Collects Chapter One #0–6, Chapter Two #0–12, and #1/2
- Project SuperPowers Omnibus Volume 2: Black Terror TP (ISBN 1524109339)
  - Collects Black Terror (2008) #1–14
- Project Superpowers Omnibus Vol. 3: Heroes and Villains (ISBN 1524113018)
  - Collects The Death-Defying 'Devil (2008) #1–4, FCBD 2008, Masquerade #1–4, Project Superpowers: Meet the Bad Guys #1–4, Project Superpowers X-Mas Carol Special, and The Owl #1–4.

== Spin-offs ==
There are a number of spin-off limited series from this series including:

- Black Terror Volume 1 (written by Jim Krueger with art by Mike Lilly)
- Black Terror Volume 2 (written by Max Bemis with art by Matt Gaudio and Ruairi Coleman)
- Masquerade (written by Phil Hester with art by Carlos Paul)
- Death-Defying 'Devil Volume 1 (written by Joe Casey with art by Edgar Salazar)
- Death-Defying 'Devil Volume 2 (written by Gail Simone with art by Walter Geovanni)
- The Owl (written by J.T. Krul with art by Heubert Khan Michael)
- Blackcross (written by Warren Ellis with art by Colton Worley)
- Scarlet Sisters (written by Alex Segura with art by Emiliana Pinna)
- Cat-man and Kitten (written by Jeff Parker with art by Joseph Cooper)
- Rocketman & Rocketgirl (written by Jacob Edgar with art by Jordi Perez)

== See also ==
- Superpower (ability)
- Terra Obscura
