= Four Favorites =

1940s comic series

Four Favorites is a Golden Age American comics series that ran for 32 issues from September, 1941 through December, 1947. It was published by Ace Publications.

Upon cancellation the magazine continued as Crime Must Pay the Penalty for one issue #33, then as Four Teeners for issue 34. Though the series started as a superhero comic it abandoned that genre after issue 26.

Ace's output of a few dozen issues of costume hero interest bursts with generic patriotic energy — nothing really creative, but still typical of the period and generally written and drawn a cut above better known companies of the era. It took collectors a long time to discover the Ace heroes because most of them were gone well before the end of World War II. Ace became much better known for its pulps (1930s and 40s) and paperbacks (beginning with the classic Ace Double Novels in 1952). Yet the company was a significant second-tier comic book outfit from 1940-56, especially in the romance field from 1949-56.

== Publication history ==
Four Favorites was numbered consecutively for 32 issues. Although the covers are generally not as cool as Lightning, this is your best bet if you want to get all the major Ace heroes in one book. Magno ran through #26; Lash Lightning through #22 (with Lightning Girl in #19-22); The Unknown Soldier in #4-20; The Raven through #4; Vulcan through #3; Captain Courageous in costume in #5-21 except #6; and The Flag in #6. The best issues are the first 18, since you get four full-length super hero stories in every issue of 10 to 16 pages. These 18 issues of Four Favorites are prime Golden Age examples of patriotic heroes.

These comics are in the public domain, and various publishers and creators have used them since.

== Cover gallery ==
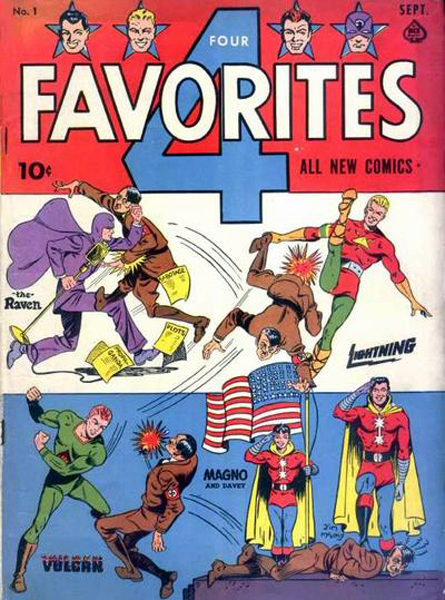
Issue 1: September, 1941

Issue 2:

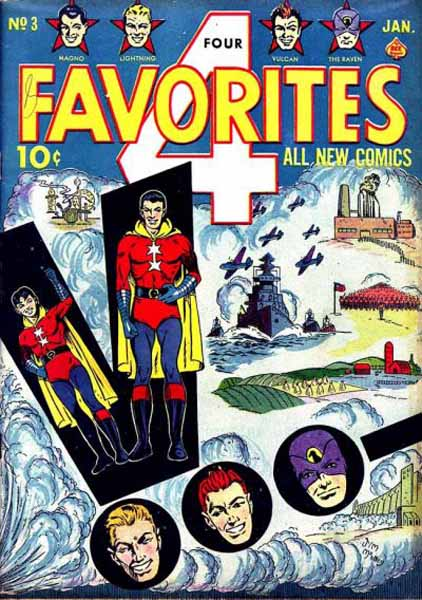
Issue 3: January, 1942

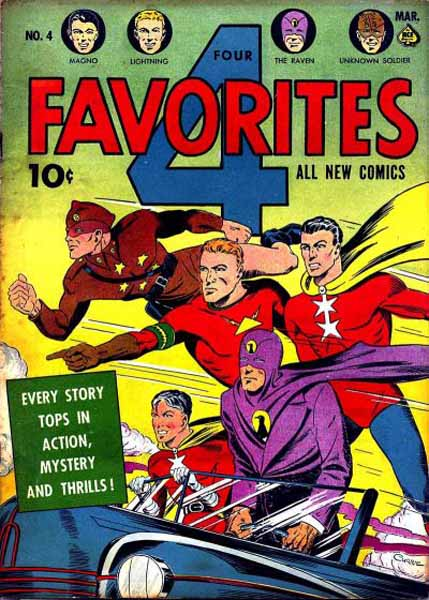
Issue 4: March, 1942

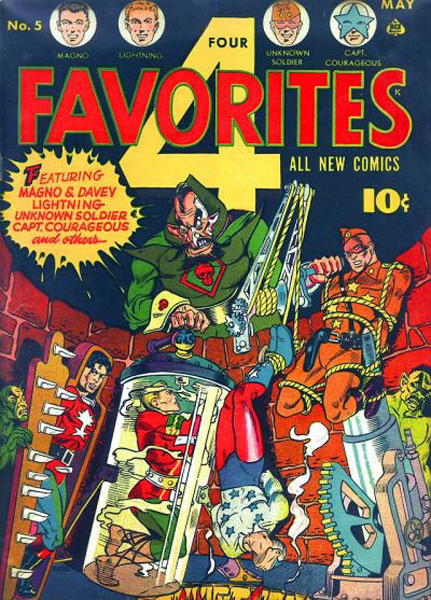
Issue 5: May, 1942

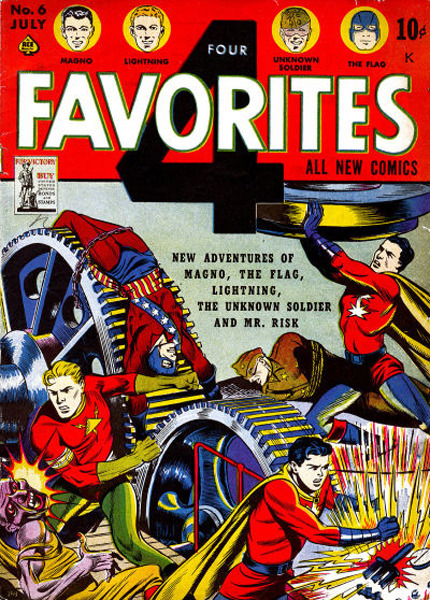
Issue 6: July, 1942

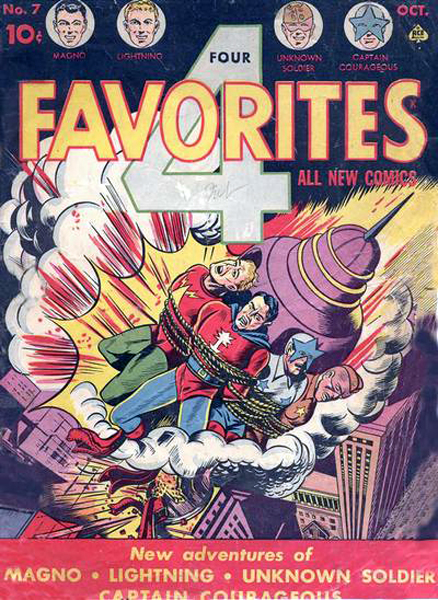
Issue 7: October, 1942

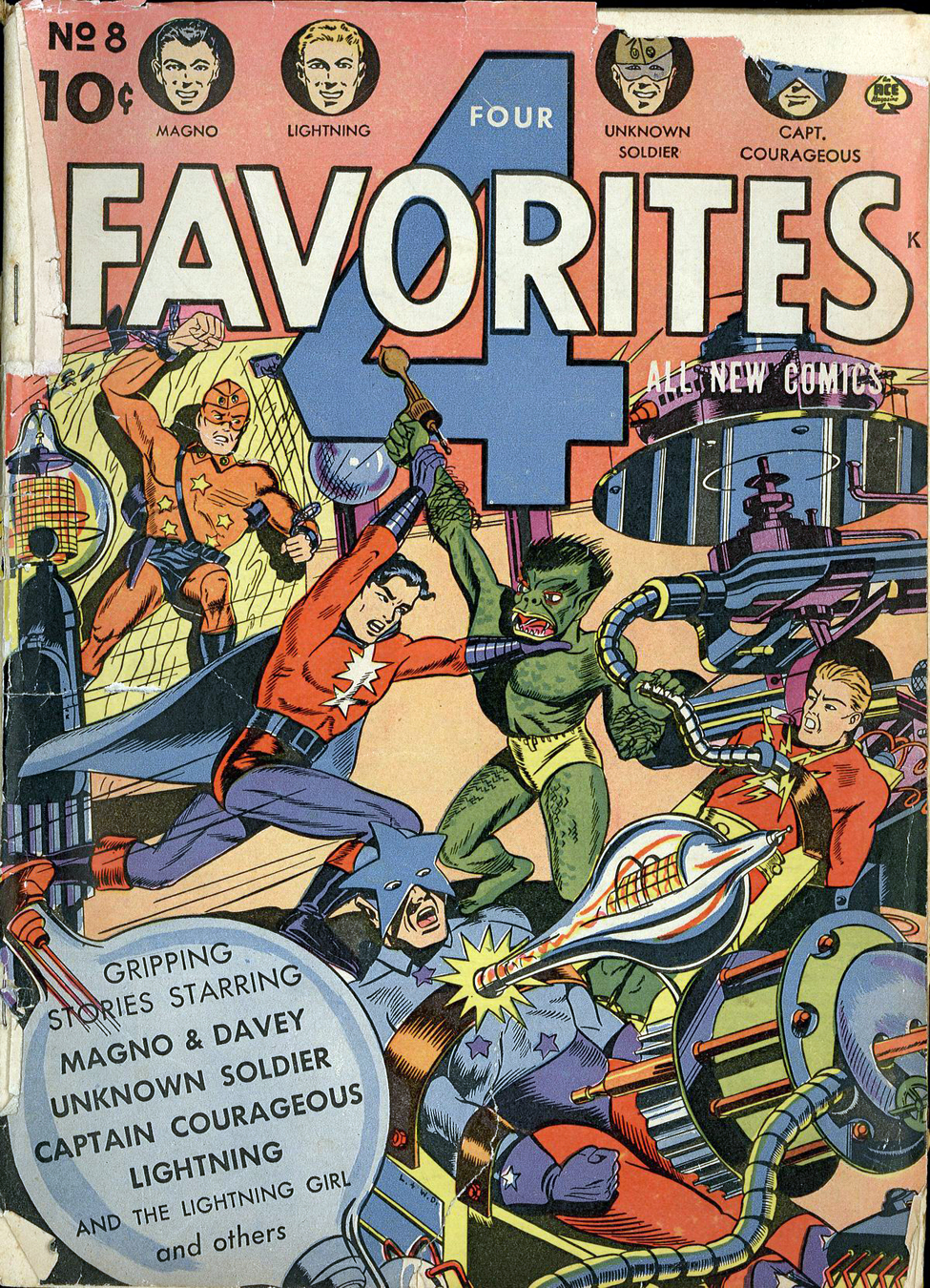
Issue 8: December, 1942

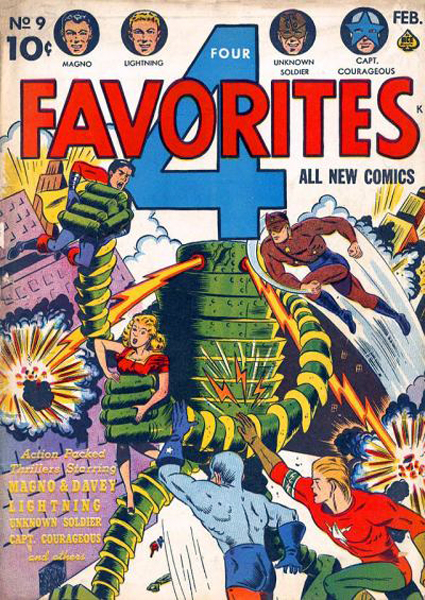
Issue 9: January, 1943

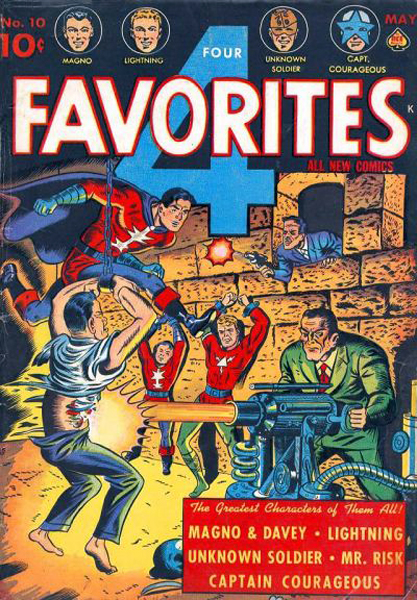
Issue 10: May, 1943

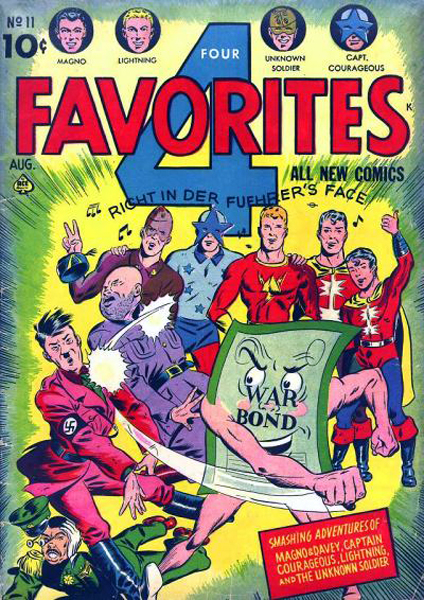
Issue 11: August, 1943

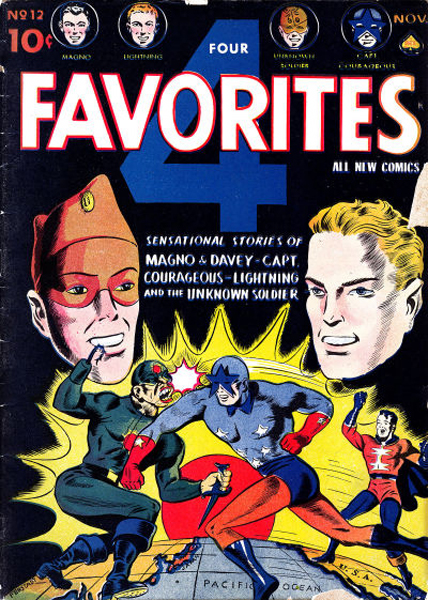
Issue 12: November, 1943

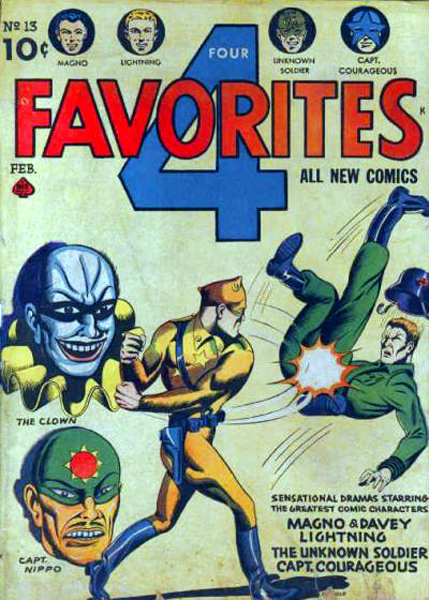
Issue 13: February, 1944

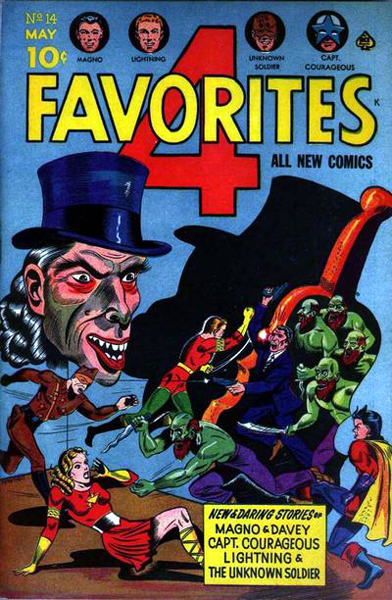
Issue 14: May, 1944

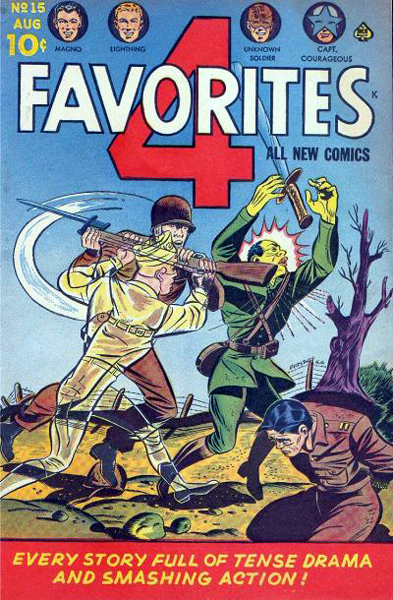
Issue 15: August, 1944

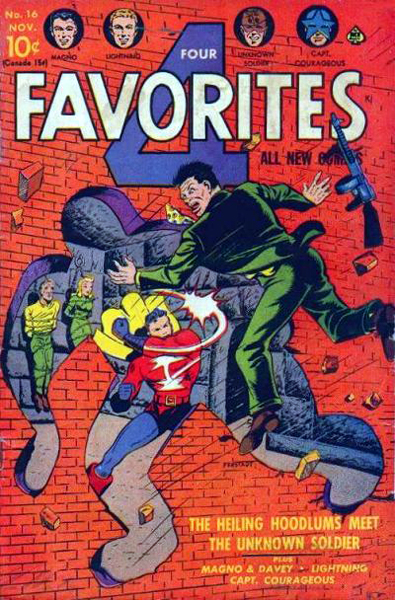
Issue 16: November, 1944

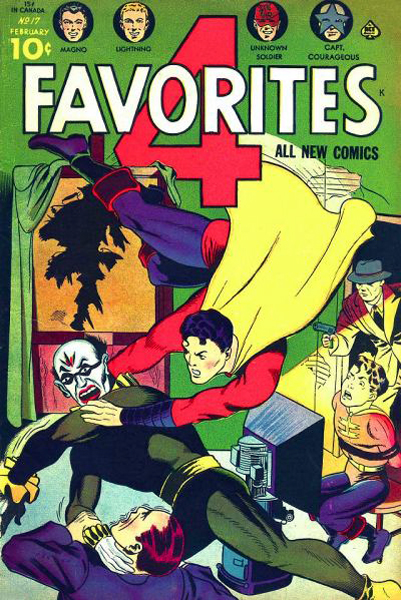
Issue 17: February, 1945

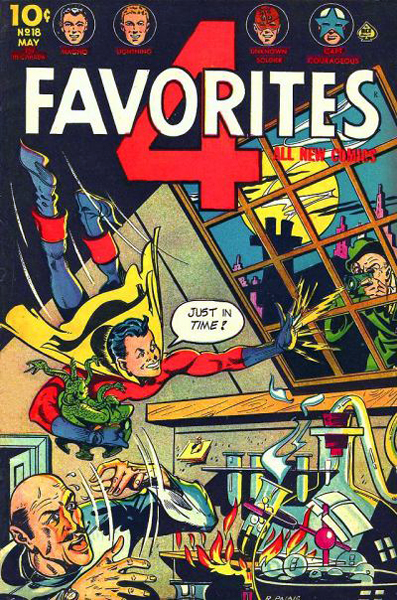
Issue 18: May, 1945

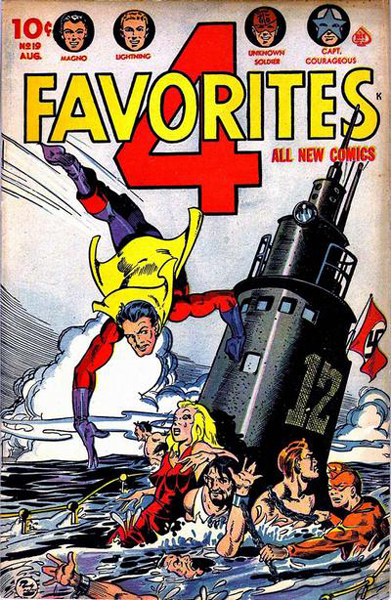
Issue 19: August, 1945

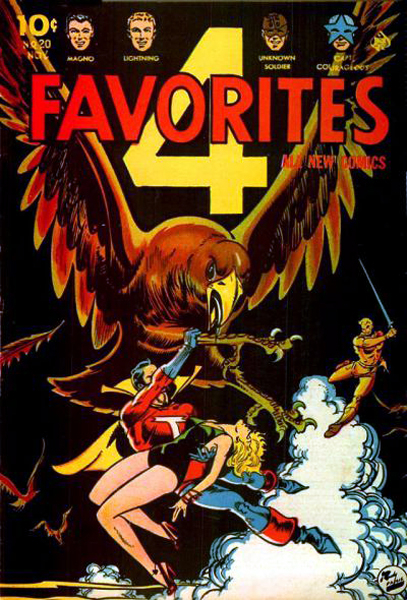
Issue 20: November, 1945

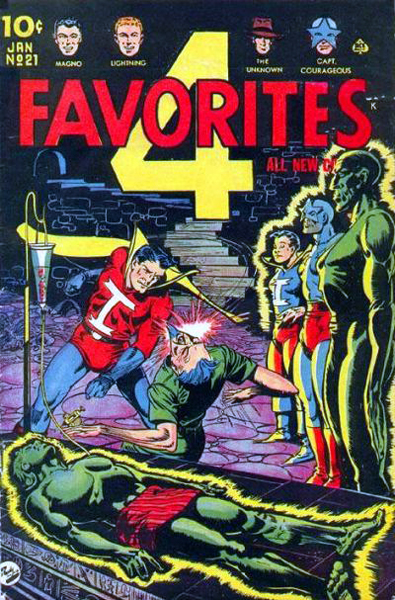
Issue 21: January, 1946

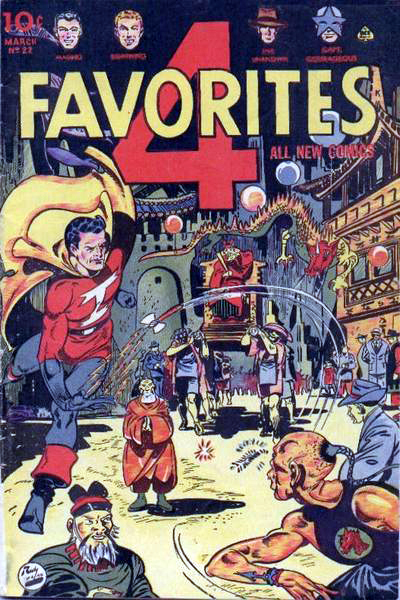
Issue 22: March, 1946

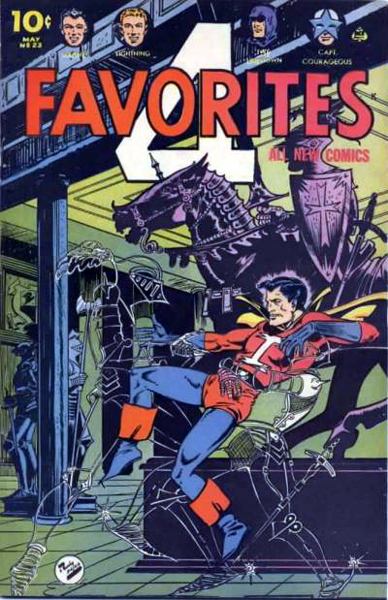
Issue 23: May, 1946

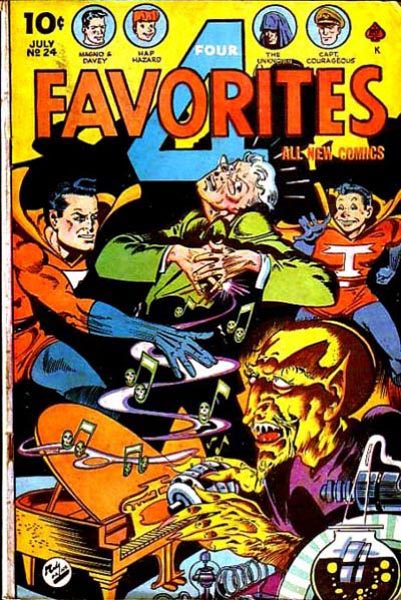
Issue 24: July, 1946

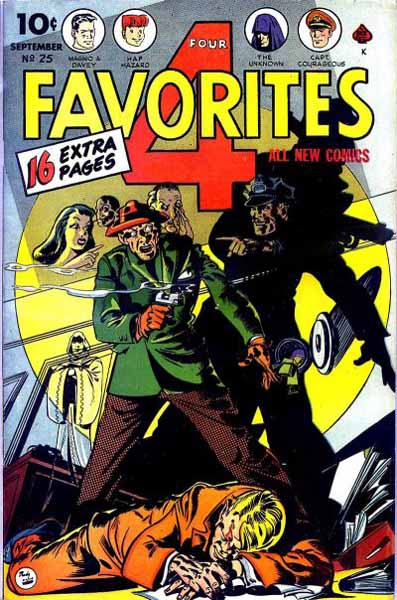
Issue 25: September, 1946

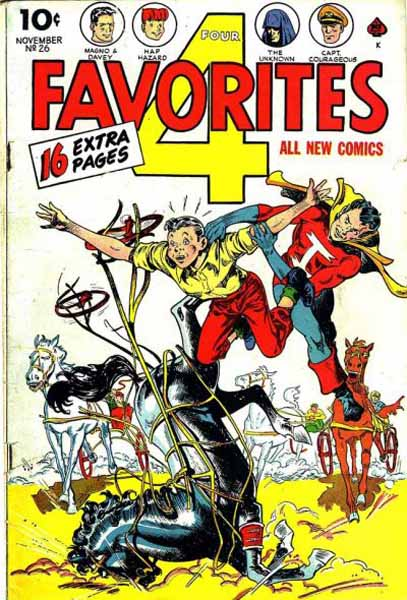
Issue 26: November, 1946

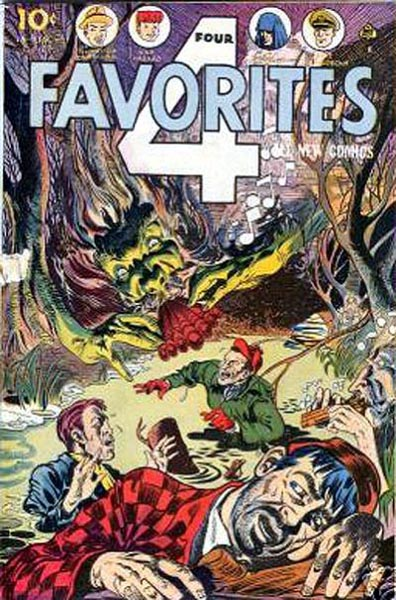
Issue 27: January, 1947

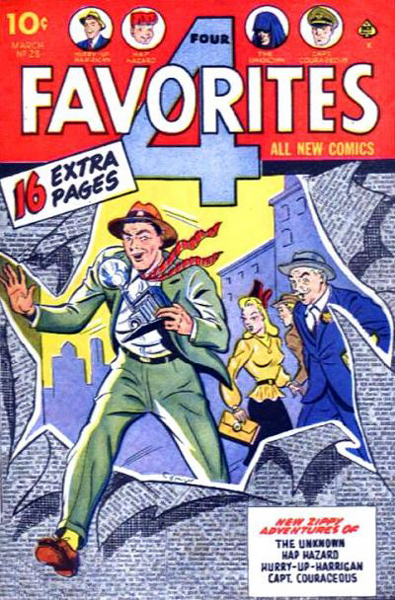
Issue 28: March, 1947

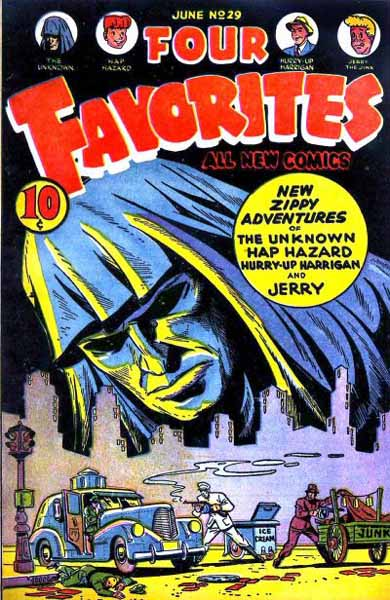
Issue 29: June, 1947

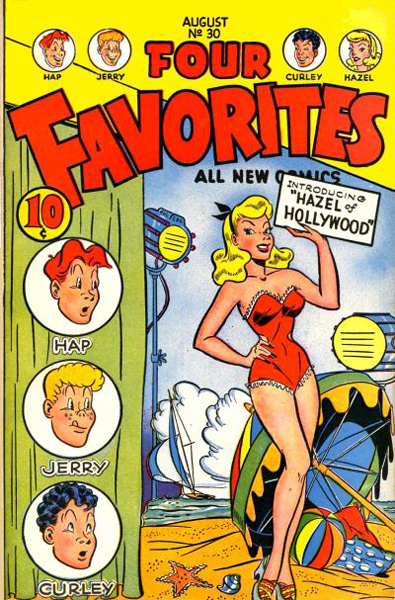
Issue 30: August, 1947

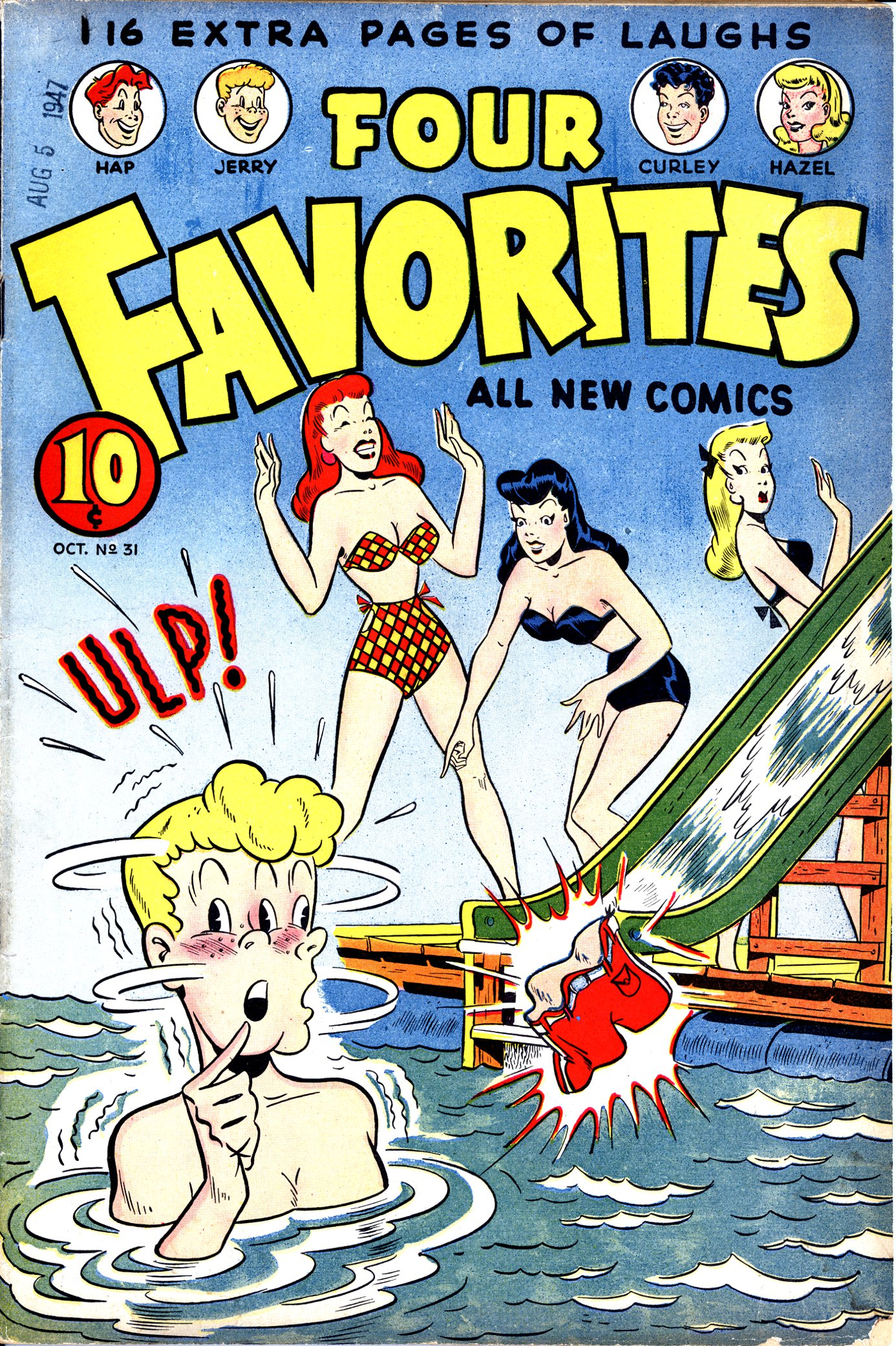
Issue 31: October, 1947

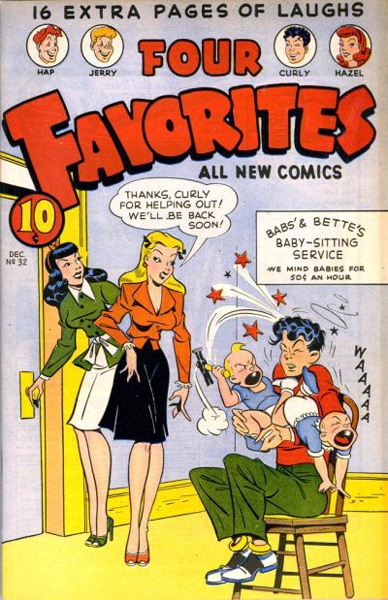
Issue 32: December, 1947
