= Paul Chadwick (author) =

American magazine author (1902–1972)

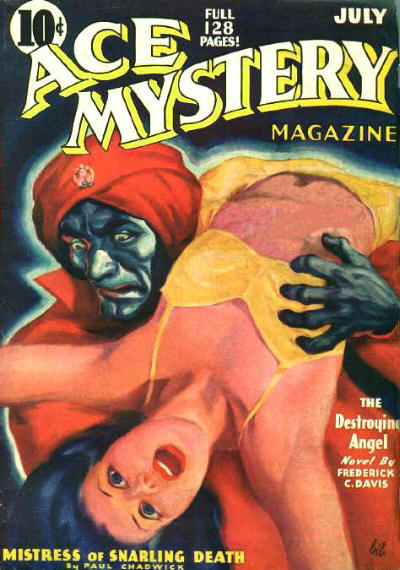
Chadwick's "Mistress of Snarling Death" was cover-featured on the July 1936 issue of Ace Mystery

Paul Chadwick (1902–1972) was a pulp magazine author who wrote many stories under his own name and various pseudonyms. As was the case with many prolific contributors to the pulps, he wrote in a number of different genres including detective stories, science fiction and westerns. He created Secret Agent X, published under the "house name" of Brant House, and also wrote the one and only issue of the Doc Savage clone Captain Hazzard (May 1938) under the name of Chester Hawks.

Many of Chadwick's detective stories feature the hardboiled character Wade Hammond, who first appeared in Detective-Dragnet/Ten Detective Aces magazine in 1931. The Hammond stories were notable in combining three emerging genres of the time: science fiction and weird menace as well as hardboiled detectives.

His publishing record is sparse for the years during World War II and immediately following. In the late 1940s, he re-emerged as writer for the western pulps. His stories appear into the mid-1950s, particularly in Ranch Romances. After that, he went into newspaper work for the remainder of his career.
