= Captain Courageous (comics) =

Publication information
- Publisher: Ace Comics
- First appearance: Banner Comics #3 (September 1941)

In-story information
- Alter ego: None
- Species: Supernatural being
- Team affiliations: The Super-Mysterymen
- Abilities: Super-strength, flight, limited invulnerability; can exist underwater unaided.

Captain Courageous is a superhero character who first appeared in Banner Comics #3 (cover-dated September 1941) from Ace Comics.

== Publishing history ==
Captain Courageous appeared in Banner Comics from issue #3 to #6 (September 1941 - March 1942); issue #6 was renamed Captain Courageous Comics. He then moved to the Ace title Four Favorites in issue #5 (May 1942) to #21 (January 1946).

In 2008, Captain Courageous appeared in flashback in Project Superpowers #0. The one-shot Project Superpowers: Chapter Two Prelude shows the Captain as part of a group called The Super-Mysterymen.

== Fictional biography ==
=== Ace ===
Captain Courageous is an omnipresent supernatural being who comes to the aid of brave people who ask for courage; during the Second World War he aids the Allied forces. He appears as a man dressed in a red-and-blue costume with stars on it and a star-shaped mask. His powers include super-strength, flight, limited invulnerability, and the ability to exist underwater unaided. According to Jess Nevins' Encyclopedia of Golden Age Superheroes, "he assaults Nazis who have catapult planes concealed in a skyscraper and planes disguised as American planes, as well as man-eating locusts and Yellow Peril superhumans like the costumed Captain Nippo, a recurring character". Nippo, who had a hook hand and commanded an army of white apes, first appeared in Four Favorites issue #9 (Feb 1943) and was finally tried and executed by a military court in issue #24 (July 1946).

From Super-Mystery Comics #23 onward, the Captain trades his costume for civilian clothes and stops displaying any powers.

=== Project Superpowers ===
At some point after the war, the misguided Fighting Yank trapped the Captain and other heroes in the mystical Urn of Pandora; decades later, the Urn was broken and its inhabitants freed. Captain Courageous and seven other heroes — including Lash Lightning and Lightning Girl, Mr. Raven, Soldier Unknown, and the Sword — are then brought together to form a team called the Super-Mysterymen.
