= A. A. Wyn =

American publisher

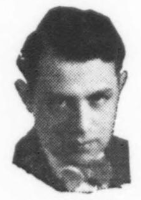
A. A. Wyn in 1932

Aaron A. Wyn (born Aaron Abraham Weinstein, May 22, 1898 – November 3, 1967), known as A. A. Wyn, was an American publisher.

== Biography ==
Wyn was born as Aaron Abraham Weinstein in New York City. Wyn's father was Jacob Weinstein, born in 1864 in Russia. His mother, Rebecca Weinstein, was born in 1865 in Russia. The Weinsteins were both of Jewish ancestry and married in 1883 in Russia and had four children, two of whom died young. The family migrated to America in 1891, where Jacob worked as a cigar packer. Six more children were born in New York City. Jacob became a naturalized alien citizen in 1913.

After graduating in June 1916 from public high school in the Bronx, Aaron took on the name "Aaron A. Wyn", and it was under this name that he enrolled as a Freshman at City College of New York (C.C.N.Y.) in the fall of 1916.

Wyn did not finish college, but in 1919 he got work as a proofreader in the printing industry. By 1930 he was editing pulp magazines for Harold Hersey's Magazine Publishers, in association with Warren A. Angel. When Hersey departed the company in the summer of 1929, Wyn, after a brief interlude from Harold S. Goldsmith, took charge of the company. Hersey's swastika logo was dropped to be replaced by an ace of spades playing card symbol.

Wyn's company took on the brand names Ace Magazines, Periodical House, and A. A. Wyn's Magazine Publishers. Assisted by his wife, Rose Schiffman Wyn, whom he had married in 1926, he produced titles such as Detective-Dragnet (later changed to Ten Detective Aces), Western Trails, Secret Agent X, and Love Fiction Monthly.

Wyn also published comics between 1940 and 1956 under the Ace Comics name. Some of these were edited by Rose Wyn. Titles included Super-Mystery Comics, Four Favorites, Crime Must Pay the Penalty, and Baffling Mysteries.

Wyn branched out into book publishing in 1945. He founded Ace Books, which specialized in genre paperback books, in 1952.

Wyn was famous for paying his authors as little as he could get away with, which prompted David McDaniel to encode a comment on Wyn into one of his The Man from U.N.C.L.E. novelizations, The Monster Wheel Affair. The first letters of each chapter's title in the book's table of contents, when lined up, spell out "A.A. Wyn is a tightwad".

Wyn remained an observant Jew all of his life. In 1966, he contributed $50,000 to the New York Federation of Reformed Synagogues in support of a Counseling Center for Teenage Drug Addicts.
