= Bill Benulis =

American comic book artist

- Born: November 5, 1928 Brooklyn, New York, United States
- Died: May 30, 2011 (aged 82) Fort Pierce, Florida, United States
- Areas: Penciller, Inker

Bill Benulis (November 5, 1928 – May 30, 2011) was an American comic book artist in the 1950s. His style is distinctive, and he signed his work, he drew 146 stories in a variety of genres. He was associated with artist Jack Abel who inked much of his work. His work appears in war comics, horror comics, and science fiction comics, and was reprinted in the Marvel Comics reprint series, War Is Hell, as well as in several of the reprints of fifties comic books published under the IW imprint in the sixties. His work is also collected in several reprints in the Marvel Masterworks: Atlas Era series (Strange Tales, Battlefield and Journey into Mystery).

== Biography ==
Benulis was born in 1928 in Brooklyn, New York. He married in 1959, and has three children and two grandchildren.

Between 1952 and 1956 he drew 146 comic stories, mostly for Atlas Comics, but also for Fiction House, Lev Gleason, Simon and Kirby, American Comics Group, Superior, Prize and Premier Magazines. In 1952 he drew his only superhero stories, two Captain America tales in Captain America Comics #76. Although most of the comic stories that he drew did not credit the writer, he illustrated many written by Carl Wessler and several by Stan Lee, Frank Kelly, Hank Chapman and Burt Frohman. About a third of his stories were inked by Jack Abel.

He decided not to pursue his art further past the end of 1956 in order to provide for his family by working in the post office. Despite living with the after-effects of childhood polio, he worked many years on foot as a letter carrier in the post office and retired from it around 1993. Sadly, he never drew any more after his short time in comics—a time in which he was able to work alongside others he admired like Will Eisner and Stan Lee. He illustrated a cover for an early science fiction book by Scientology founder L. Ron Hubbard.

== Bibliography ==
- Adventures Into Mystery 2, Atlas Comics
- Adventures Into Terror 11, 22–27, 31, Atlas Comics
- Adventures Into Weird Worlds 9, 12, 16, 24, 27, Atlas Comics
- Amazing Detective Cases 4, Atlas Comics
- Astonishing 21, 29, 41, 45, 48, Atlas Comics
- Battle 20, 40, 41, Atlas Comics
- Battle Action 23, Atlas Comics
- Battlefield 10, Atlas Comics
- Battlefront 30, 34, 37, Atlas Comics
- Battleground 12, 14, Atlas Comics
- Black Magic (1950 series) Vol. 4, 4, Prize
- Captain America Comics 76, Atlas Comics
- Combat 10, 11, Atlas Comics
- Combat Casey 10–14, Atlas Comics
- Crime Does Not Pay (1942 series) 123, Lev Gleason
- Ghost Comics 4–11, Fiction House
- Girl Confessions 31, Atlas Comics
- Journey into Mystery 3, 10, 21, 24, 31, 33, 38, Atlas Comics
- Journey into Unknown Worlds 33, 34, Atlas Comics
- Jumbo Comics 163, Fiction House
- Jungle Comics 163, Fiction House
- Justice Traps the Guilty Vol. 8, 2 Prize
- Marines in Action 8, Atlas Comics
- Marvel Tales 110, 111, 139, 141, Atlas Comics
- Marked Ranger 7, Fiction House
- Men's Adventures 19, Atlas Comics
- Monster 2, Fiction House
- Mystery Tales 2, 8, 15, 19, 28, 34, 35, 38, Atlas Comics
- Mystic 15, 30, 42, 45, 47, 481, Atlas Comics
- Navy Action 1, 2, 3, 5, 8, Atlas Comics
- Outlaw Fighters 3, Atlas Comics
- Planet Comics 71, 72, 73, Fiction House
- Police Against Crime 2, 5, 6, Premier Magazines
- Rangers 67-69 Fiction House
- Romantic Adventures 40, American Comics Group
- Rugged Action 40, Atlas Comics
- Sinister Tales 56, Alan Class
- Spaceman 2, 6, Atlas Comics
- Spellbound 10, 11, 15, 23, 24, 26, Atlas Comics
- Strange Suspense Stories 6, Atlas Comics
- Strange Tales 9, 10, 22, 30, 31, 36, 40, 50, Atlas Comics
- Strange Tales of the Unusual 3, 4, Atlas Comics
- Tales of Justice 54, Atlas Comics
- Uncanny Tales (comics) 11, 21, 22, 25, 26, 28, 30, 33, 38, 41, 42, 45, Atlas Comics
- War Comics 13, 21, 33, 37, 40, Atlas Comics
- Western Outlaws 2, Atlas Comics
- Wild Western 32, Atlas Comics
- Wings Comics 124, Fiction House
- Young Brides Vol.2, 5, Prize
- Young Love Vol. 5, 11, Prize
