= Alex Blum =

Hungarian-American comic book artist

- Born: Blum Sándor Aladár; February 7, 1889 Hungary
- Died: September 1969 (aged 80) Rye, New York
- Area: Artist
- Pseudonym: Alex Boon
- Notable works: Classics Illustrated
- Spouse: Helen

Blum illustration from Classics Illustrated issue 87, A Midsummer Night's Dream

Alexander Anthony Blum (February 7, 1889 – September 1969) was a Hungarian-American comic book artist best remembered for his contributions in the 1940s and 1950s to the long-running comic book series Classics Illustrated.

== Biography ==
Born Sándor Aladár Blum in Hungary, into a Jewish family, Blum studied at the National Academy of Design in New York before moving with his young family to the Germantown section of Philadelphia, where he worked as a portrait painter.

During the Great Depression, Blum's career as a portrait painter evaporated, leading the family to move to New York City, seeking work. He signed with the comic book packager Eisner & Iger, and in the 1930s and 1940s his work appeared in comics published by Fox Comics, Quality Comics, Fiction House and Fawcett Comics. He occasionally worked in collaboration with his daughter, Toni Blum, born in 1918, who wrote comics during that period for Eisner & Iger.

For Fox Feature Syndicate (as "Alex Boon"), he illustrated the debut of the fictional superhero Samson, in Fantastic Comics #1 (Dec. 1939). He drew The Red Comet in Planet Comics #6–10 (Fiction House, 1940–1941).

Later, in the period 1948 to 1955, he worked for the publisher Gilberton, illustrating almost twenty-five Classics Illustrated titles, as well as Snow White and the Seven Dwarfs, the debut issue of Classics Illustrated Junior. Along with Henry C. Kiefer, he was one of the leading Classics Illustrated artists.

== Personal life and death ==
Blum and his wife Helen had two children, a son and a daughter, Audrey Anthony "Toni" Blum (1918–c. 1972), who also became a comic book creator.

Blum died in 1969 in Rye, New York.

== Bibliography ==
- Samson (Fox, 1939–c. 1941)
- The Eagle (Fox, 1941–1942)
- Neon the Unknown in Hit Comics (Quality, 1940–1941)
- The Purple Trio in Smash Comics (Quality, 1940–1942)
- The Strange Twins in Hit Comics (Quality, 1940–1942)
- Captain Nelson Cole in Planet Comics (Fiction House, 1940–1941)
- The Red Comet in Planet Comics #6–10 (Fiction House, 1940–1941)
- Kaänga Comics (Fiction House)
- Midnight the Black Stallion in Jumbo Comics (Fiction House, 1941–1942)
- Greasemonkey Griffin in Wings Comics (Fiction House)
- Classics Illustrated (Gilberton, 1948–1955):
  - Alice in Wonderland — #49 (1948)
  - The Song of Hiawatha — #57 (1949)
  - The Woman in White — #61 (1949)
  - Treasure Island — #64 (1949)
  - The Scottish Chiefs — #67 (1950)
  - The Pilot — #70 (1950)
  - The Man Who Laughs — #71 (1950)
  - The Black Tulip — #73 (1950)
  - The Iliad — #77 (1950)
  - Cyrano de Bergerac — #79 (1951)
  - White Fang — #80 (1951)
  - The Jungle Book, with William Bossert — #83 (1951)
  - The Gold Bug and Other Stories — #84 (1951)
  - The Sea Wolf — #85 (1951)
  - A Midsummer Night's Dream — #87 (1951)
  - Green Mansions — #90 (1951)
  - The Courtship of Miles Standish and Evangeline — #92 (1952)
  - Daniel Boone — #96 (1952)
  - Hamlet — #99 (1952)
  - The White Company — #102 (1952)
  - From the Earth to the Moon — #105 (1953)
  - Knights of the Round Table — #108 (1953)
  - Macbeth — #128 (1955)
- Classics Illustrated Junior (Gilberton, 1953–1954):
  - Snow White and the Seven Dwarfs — #501 (1953)
  - Jack and the Beanstalk — #507 (1954)
- Classics Illustrated Special Edition (Gilberton, 1955):
  - The Story of Jesus — #129A (with William A. Walsh) (1955)
