= Ruth Atkinson =

Canadian American comic book writer and artist

- Born: June 2, 1918 Toronto, Ontario, Canada
- Died: June 1, 1997 (aged 78) Pacifica, California, U.S.
- Areas: Writer, Penciller
- Notable works: Millie the Model; Patsy Walker

Ruth Atkinson Ford, née Ruth Atkinson and a.k.a. R. Atkinson (June 2, 1918 – June 1, 1997), (Note: There is some dispute as to Atkinson's date of death, with the Ink Blots column of the Comic Artists Professional Society monthly newsletter and Comics Buyer's Guide giving the date as June 1, 1997. Lambiek Comiclopedia and The Comics Journal, however, both give the date of death as May 31, 1997. Finally, Atkinson's Social Security Death Index entry gives a date of June 15, 1997, and states verification came per a family member or someone acting on behalf of a family member, rather than an observed death certificate. Family members sometimes inadvertently submit filing dates or burial dates.) was an American cartoonist and pioneering female comic book writer-artist who created the long-running Marvel Comics character Millie the Model and co-created Patsy Walker.

== Biography ==
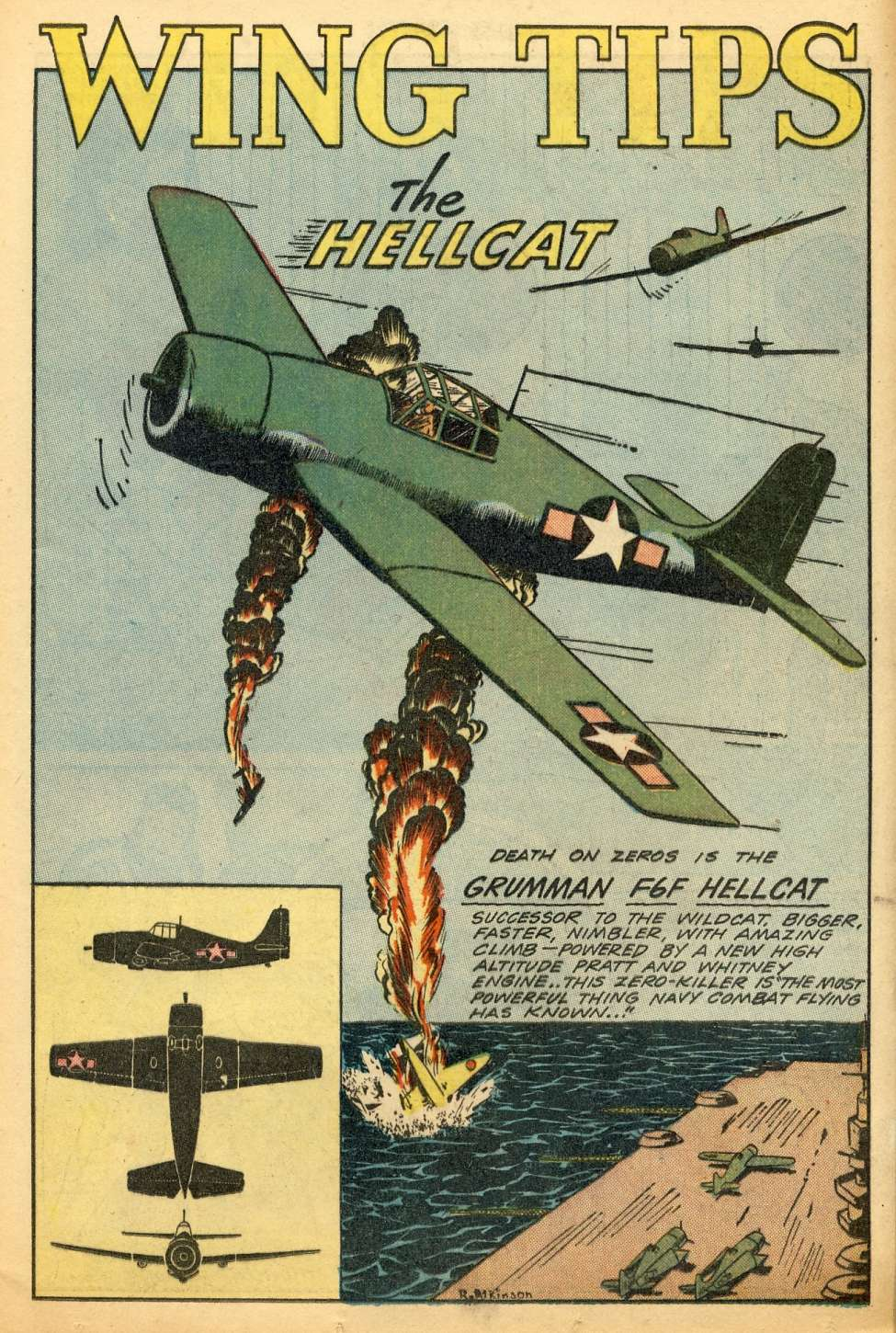
Her creation Patsy Walker would become the superheroine Hellcat in 1976, but Ruth Atkinson was drawing Hellcats long before then. From Wings Comics #45 (Nov. 1944).

Born in Toronto, Ontario, Canada, Ruth Atkinson as an infant moved with her family to upstate New York.

One of the first female artists in American comic books, she entered the field doing work for the publisher Fiction House beginning either 1942 or 1943, and either on staff or, as noted by the Connecticut Historical Society, through the Iger Studio, a comic book packager that produced comics for publishers on an outsource basis. Fellow female artists Fran Hopper, Lily Renée, and Marcia Snyder also worked for Iger, where one of the business partners was a woman, Ruth Roche. Atkinson's first confirmed, signed work is the single-page "Wing Tips" featurette in Wings Comics #42 (Feb. 1944).

Atkinson continued to pencil and ink that airplane-profile featurette, as well such Fiction House features as "Clipper Kirk" and "Suicide Smith" in Wings Comics, "Tabu" in Jungle Comics, and "Sea Devil" in Rangers Comics. At some point, she became the Fiction House art director, but left the position to freelance after finding that the managerial position left little time for her art.

With writer Otto Binder, she went on to draw and co-create the feature "Patsy Walker", for Marvel Comics predecessor Timely Comics in Miss America Magazine #2 (Nov. 1944). She would draw that humor/romance feature for two years, as well write and draw the premiere issue of the long-running series Millie the Model.

Atkinson later drew true-life adventures for Eastern Color Printing's Heroic Comics, as well for some of the first romance comics, including Lev Gleason Publications' Boy Meets Girl and Boy Loves Girl, through the early 1950s.

Atkinson retired from comics sometime after her marriage. She was living in Pacifica, California, at the time of her death from cancer.

== Personal ==
Her brother, horse-racing Hall of Fame jockey Ted Atkinson, died in 2005.

== Bibliography ==
- Miss America (Vol. 1, #2, #4; 1944–45)
- Patsy Walker (#1, 2, 4; 1945–46)
- Miss America (Vol. 3, #1, 4; 1945)
- Andy Comics (#20, 1948)
- Juke Box Comics (#3–4; 1948)
- Lovers' Lane (#1, 3, 4, 6–7, 9–11, 14, 16, 24, 26, 27; 1949–52)
- Boy Meets Girl (#1, 6–7, 12, 16, 18–22; 1950–52)
- Boy Loves Girl (#25–26, 28; 1952)
- A Century of Women Cartoonists (1993) - Chapters 4 and 5

== See also ==
- List of women in comics
