= Howard Larsen =

American cartoonist

Howard Larsen's art for EC's Crime Patrol #11 (1949)

Howard Larsen was an American comic book illustrator for EC Comics and other publishers during the 1940s and 1950s.

== Crime and Western comics ==
Specializing in crime and Western stories, Larsen contributed to several comics publishers, including American (Spy-Hunters), Avon (Romantic Love, Slave Girl, Wild Bill Hickok), Charlton Comics (Marvels of Science), Et-Es-Go (Suspense), Fiction House (Jungle Comics, Planet Comics, Wings Comics), Novelty (Blue Bolt), St. John Publications (The Texan) and Victory (X-Venture).

== EC Comics ==
His stories for EC were in Crime Patrol #11 ("The Werewolf's Curse!"), Crime Patrol #12 ("The Hanged Man’s Revenge"), The Vault of Horror #21 ("That’s a ‘Croc’!") and Tales from the Crypt #26 ("The Borrowed Body").
