= Art Saaf =

American comics artist

- Born: Arthur Saaf; December 4, 1921 Brooklyn, New York, U.S.
- Died: April 21, 2007 (aged 85)
- Areas: Penciller, Inker
- Notable works: Highlights for Children; Princess Pantha; Supergirl

Arthur Saaf (December 4, 1921 – April 21, 2007) was an American comics artist from the Golden Age of Comics who also worked in television. He commonly went by Art or Artie.

== Career ==
Art Saaf was born in Brooklyn, New York in 1921 and developed his art skills working at Macfadden Publishing in 1938 and built his first art table using schematics from Mechanics Illustrated. He then majored in pictorial illustration at Pratt Institute from 1941 to 1942, then attended the School of Arts and Mechanics and the Art Students League of New York.

During World War II Saaf worked on titles including Commando Rangers and Phantom Falcons as well as covers and features (like "Clipper Kirk") for Wings Comics and Jumbo Comics. He "ghosted" Hap Hopper, providing art credited to Drew Pearson. After the war, Saaf worked for Timely Comics and Dell Comics as well as drawing autobiographical comics including "The Clown of Baseball" for Real Life Comics. He drew the first appearance of Princess Pantha in Thrilling Comics #56 (Oct. 1946) and drew the character's feature until its end in 1949.

While still doing comic book work, Saaf ventured into television. In 1954 he worked for the Kudner Agency as an assistant television director and provided storyboards for The Jackie Gleason Show, and followed that in 1956 working for Dancer, Fitzgerald and Sample Agency. Around 1959, Saaf began working at a freelancer, stating "the pace was too fast, and I wanted time to think about what I was doing." Into the 1960s he worked for numerous agencies providing many advertisements for products ranging from Post Cereal, Crest, Zest, Maxwell House, Life Savers and many others.

In the 1970s, he worked for DC Comics illustrating romance stories until finally leaving comic books. He drew Supergirl stories in the character's original solo series in 1972. He continued drawing in other publishing fields and provided work for Highlights for Children magazine as well as various newspapers and other publications.

Saaf died April 21, 2007, from the effects of Parkinson's disease at age 85.

== Bibliography ==
=== DC Comics ===
- Adventure Comics #409, 412–413 (Supergirl) (1971)
- Angel and the Ape #5 (1969)
- Binky #72 (1970)
- DC Special Series #7 (1977)
- Falling in Love #102, 110–111, 115–117, 121–122, 127, 139, 141 (1968–1973)
- Ghosts #5–7, 29, 74 (1972–1979)
- Girls' Love Stories #144, 152, 154, 156–157, 159, 166, 168, 177 (1969–1973)
- Girls' Romances #154, 157 (1971)
- Heart Throbs #132–133, 146 (1971–1972)
- Love Stories #149–152 (1973)
- Meet Angel #7 (Angel and the Ape) (1969)
- Our Fighting Forces #118–122 (1969)
- Supergirl #1–4, 6–10 (1972–1974)
- The Superman Family #165 (Supergirl) (1974)
- Superman's Girl Friend, Lois Lane #105, 132 (1970–1973)
- Swing with Scooter #30–31, 33 (1970–1971)
- Teen Titans #40–43 (1972–1973)
- The Unexpected #112, 114, 116, 125, 130, 135–136, 138 (1969–1972)
- The Witching Hour #15, 31–32, 39 (1971–1974)
- Young Love #60, 84–85, 91, 120 (1967–1976)
- Young Romance #171–172, 175, 191 (1971–1973)

=== Fiction House ===
- Fight Comics #4, 7, 13, 17, 21–22, 28–29 (1940–1943)
- Jumbo Comics #17, 21–35, 39, 55–65 (1940–1944)
- Jungle Comics #12, 15, 42, 44, 48, 54–55, 161 (1940–1953)
- Planet Comics #11, 14, 18–23, 66–67, 69 (1941–1952)
- Rangers Comics #8–20 (1942–1944)
- Rangers of Freedom Comics #4–7 (1942)
- Sheena, Queen of the Jungle #3 (1943)
- Wings Comics #7, 15, 19–57, 98 (1941–1948)

=== Gold Key Comics ===
- Boris Karloff Tales of Mystery #24–25 (1968–1969)
- Mystery Comics Digest #7, 17–18, 21, 26 (1972–1975)
- Ripley's Believe It or Not! #12, 77, 80 (1969–1978)
- The Twilight Zone #27, 29 (1968–1969)

=== Harvey Comics ===
- Champ Comics #14–17 (1941)
- First Romance Magazine #47, 52 (1957–1958)
- Speed Comics #13 (1941)

=== Quality Comics ===
- National Comics #17–18 (1941–1942)

=== Standard Comics ===
- Adventures into Darkness #5, 7, 10 (1952–1953)
- America's Best Comics #28 (1948)
- Best Romance #5–7 (1952)
- Broncho Bill #8, 12 (1948–1949)
- Crime Files #6 (1952)
- Date with Danger #6 (1953)
- Dear Beatrice Fairfax #8–9 (1951)
- Exciting Comics #66, 68–69 (1949)
- Fantastic Worlds #6 (1952)
- Fighting Yank #27 (1949)
- Intimate Love #12, 14–16, 18, 21, 24–28 (1951–1954)
- Joe Yank #5–6, 9 (1952)
- Kathy #11–17 (1952–1953)
- Lost Worlds #6 (1952)
- Mel Allen Sports Comics #1, 6 (1949–1950)
- My Real Love #5 (1952)
- New Romances #5–6, 8, 10, 13–16, 18, 20–21 (1951–1954)
- Out of the Shadows #5 (1952)
- Ozark Ike #19 (1950)
- Popular Romance #9, 12, 14, 17–18, 23, 27–29 (1950–1954)
- Real Life Comics #50–52, 54 (1949–1950)
- Startling Comics #52–53 (1948)
- This Is War #8 (1953)
- Thrilling Comics #56, 58, 62–66, 68–74, 76–78 (1946–1950)
- Thrilling Romances #5, 12–13, 15–19, 22–26 (1949–1954)
- Today's Romance #8 (1952)
- The Unseen #6–7, 9–10 (1952–1953)

Preceded by Mike Sekowsky	"Supergirl" feature in Adventure Comics artist 1971	Succeeded by Bob Oksner
Preceded by George Tuska	Teen Titans artist 1972–1973	Succeeded by Pablo Marcos (in 1976)
