= Wings Comics =

Aviation-themed anthology comic book

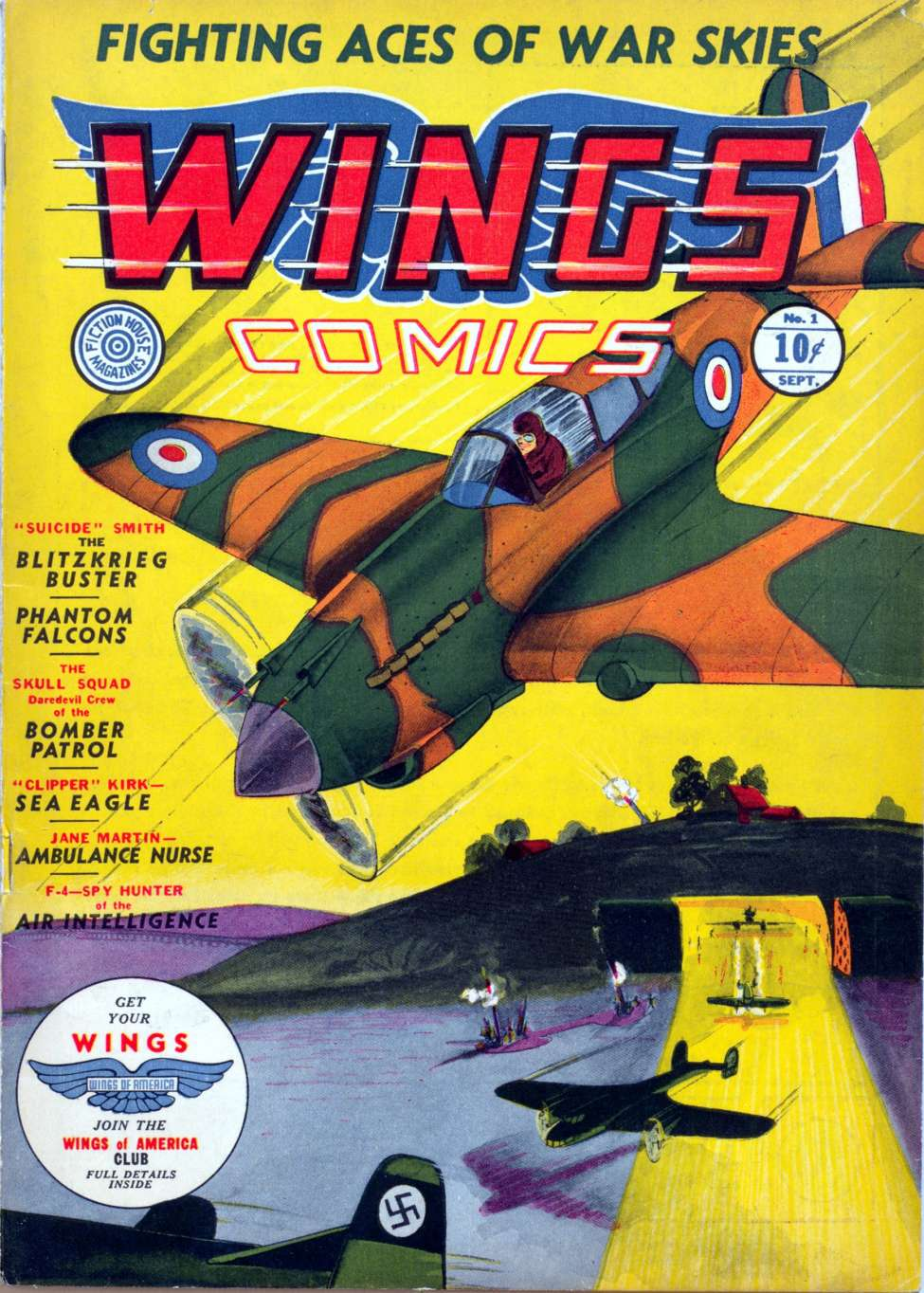
- Wings Comics #1 (Sept 1940). Cover artist(s) unknown.

Publication information
- Publisher: Fiction House
- Schedule: ongoing monthly
- Format: standard
- Genre: Adventure anthology
- Publication date: Sept. 1940–Summer 1954
- No. of issues: 124

Creative team
- Artist(s): Murphy Anderson, Ruth Atkinson, Alex Blum, John Celardo, Gene Colan, George Evans, Tom Gill, Alvin Hollingsworth, Howard Larsen, Klaus Nordling, Lily Renée, Art Saaf, George Tuska
- Editor: Jerry Iger

Wings Comics was an aviation-themed anthology comic book published by Fiction House from 1940 to 1954. Wings Comics was one of Fiction House's "Big 6" comics titles (which also included Jumbo Comics, Jungle Comics, Planet Comics, Fight Comics, and Rangers Comics).

== Overview ==
Fiction House started out as a pulp magazine publisher, with one of their more popular titles being Wings (which ultimately ran 133 issues [11+ volumes], from January 1928 to Spring 1953). Wings Comics, which was produced by the Eisner and Iger Studio, took its title and themes from the pulp title.

The title initially targeted "flight enthusiasts, with articles about the history of flight and aerobatics, such as wing walking." With the U.S entry into World War II, Wings Comics began emphasizing "patriotic war stories," similar to those of Captain Midnight and Quality Comics' Blackhawk. With the end of the war, Wings Comics returned its focus to historical stories, "real-life heroes of aviation," and text pieces on model aircraft.

Long-running recurring features in Wings Comics were "Jane Martin" and "Suicide Smith."

== Publication history ==
Wings Comics started out as a 68-page-monthly, eventually settling on 52 pages per issue until issue #106. The title went to 36 pages for the duration of its run; also becoming quarterly with issue #110 (Winter 1949).

Ultimately, Fiction House published 124 issues of Wings Comics from September 1940 to Summer 1954.

== Contributors ==
During the 1940s, John Celardo was an assistant art director and a major contributor to the Fiction House line, notably for Wings Comics.

Art Saaf produced covers for issues #7, 15, 19-57, and 98.

Pioneering female cartoonist Lily Renée worked on the "Jane Martin" feature in 1943–1944. Similarly, Ruth Atkinson's first confirmed, signed work is the single-page "Wing Tips" featurette in issue #42 (Feb. 1944). Atkinson continued to pencil and ink that featurette, as well as "Clipper Kirk" and "Suicide Smith."

Long-time Superman inker Murphy Anderson's first confirmed credit is the two-and-two-thirds-page nonfiction aviation featurette "Jet Propulsion" in Wings Comics #48 (cover-dated Aug. 1944), and his first fiction feature was an eight-page "Suicide Smith" story in issue #50 (Oct. 1944).

Gene Colan's first illustration work was in 1944 for Wings Comics ("[J]ust a summertime job before I went into the service"). This led to Colan's the one-page "Wing Tips" non-fiction filler "P-51B Mustang" (issue #52, Dec. 1944). His first comics story was a seven-page "Clipper Kirk" feature in the following month's issue.

Pioneering black cartoonist Alvin Hollingsworth produced "Suicide Smith" at least sporadically from 1946 to 1950.

Howard Larsen, George Evans, Tom Gill, George Tuska, and Klaus Nordling (under the pseudonym "Clyde North") were also Wing Comics contributors.

== Recurring features ==
"Clipper Kirk" — ran issues #1–70 (1940–1946); contributors included Art Saaf, Ruth Atkinson, and Gene Colan

"Greasemonkey Griffin" — ran issues #1–96 (1940–1948); contributors included Alex Blum

"Jane Martin" — espionage feature starring a female pilot working in the male-dominated aviation industry, which ran throughout the title's entire run. Drawn by female artists Lily Renée from issues #31 to 48 (March 1943–Aug. 1944) and Fran Hopper from issue #67 to issue #84 (March 1946–August 1947). George Tuska was also a contributor; scripts for the feature are credited to the possibly pseudonymous "F.E. Lincoln."

"Jet Propulsion" — featurette

"Parachute Patrol" — ran issues #1–23; artists included Henry C. Kiefer

"Suicide Smith and the Air Commanders" — title's other most enduring feature; contributors included Ruth Atkinson, Alvin Hollingsworth, Murphy Anderson, and Jack Keller. "Suicide Smith" also appeared in Fiction House's Jungle Comics and Rangers Comics.

"Wing Tips" — nonfiction airplane profile featurette produced by, among others, Ruth Atkinson and Gene Colan

"Yank Aces of World War II" — biographical feature; contributors included Fran Hopper
