= Murphy Anderson =

American comics artist (1926–2015)

- Anderson in the 2010s.
- Born: July 9, 1926 Asheville, North Carolina
- Died: October 22, 2015 (aged 89) Somerset, New Jersey
- Areas: Penciller, Inker
- Notable works: Action Comics; Hawkman; Superboy; Superman
- Awards: Alley Award 1962, 1963, 1964, 1965; Inkpot Award, 1984; Jack Kirby Hall of Fame, 1988; Inkwell Awards Joe Sinnott Hall of Fame (2013)

Murphy C. Anderson Jr. (July 9, 1926 – October 22, 2015) was an American comics artist, known as one of the premier inkers of his era, who worked for companies such as DC Comics for over fifty years, starting in the Golden Age of Comic Books in the 1940s. He worked on such characters as Hawkman, Batgirl, Zatanna, the Spectre, and Superman, as well as on the Buck Rogers daily syndicated newspaper comic strip. Anderson also contributed for many years to PS, the preventive maintenance comics magazine of the U.S. Army.

== Early life and career ==
Murphy Anderson was born on July 9, 1926, in Asheville, North Carolina, and while in grade school moved with his family to Greensboro, North Carolina. After graduating high school in 1943, he briefly attended the University of North Carolina before moving to New York City seeking work in the comics industry, and was hired by Jack Byrne as a staff artist at the pulp magazine publisher Fiction House, first drawing illustrations for their magazines and later for their comic book line. His first confirmed credit is the two-and-two-thirds-page nonfiction aviation featurette "Jet Propulsion" in Wings Comics #48 (cover-dated Aug. 1944), and his first fiction feature was an eight-page "Suicide Smith and the Air Commanders" story in Wings Comics #50 (Oct. 1944). By the following month he was the regular artist on the Planet Comics features "Life on Other Worlds" and "Star Pirate". Anderson continued doing comics work, as well as illustrations for science-fiction pulp magazines, during his stateside postings while serving in the United States Navy from 1944 to 1945.

From 1947 to 1949, Anderson was the artist on the Buck Rogers comic strip, a feature he had loved since he was a child, and felt like he had "made it!". During the 1950s, Anderson worked for several publishers including Pines Comics, St. John Publications, Ziff Davis, DC Comics, and Atlas Comics, that decade's predecessor of Marvel Comics.

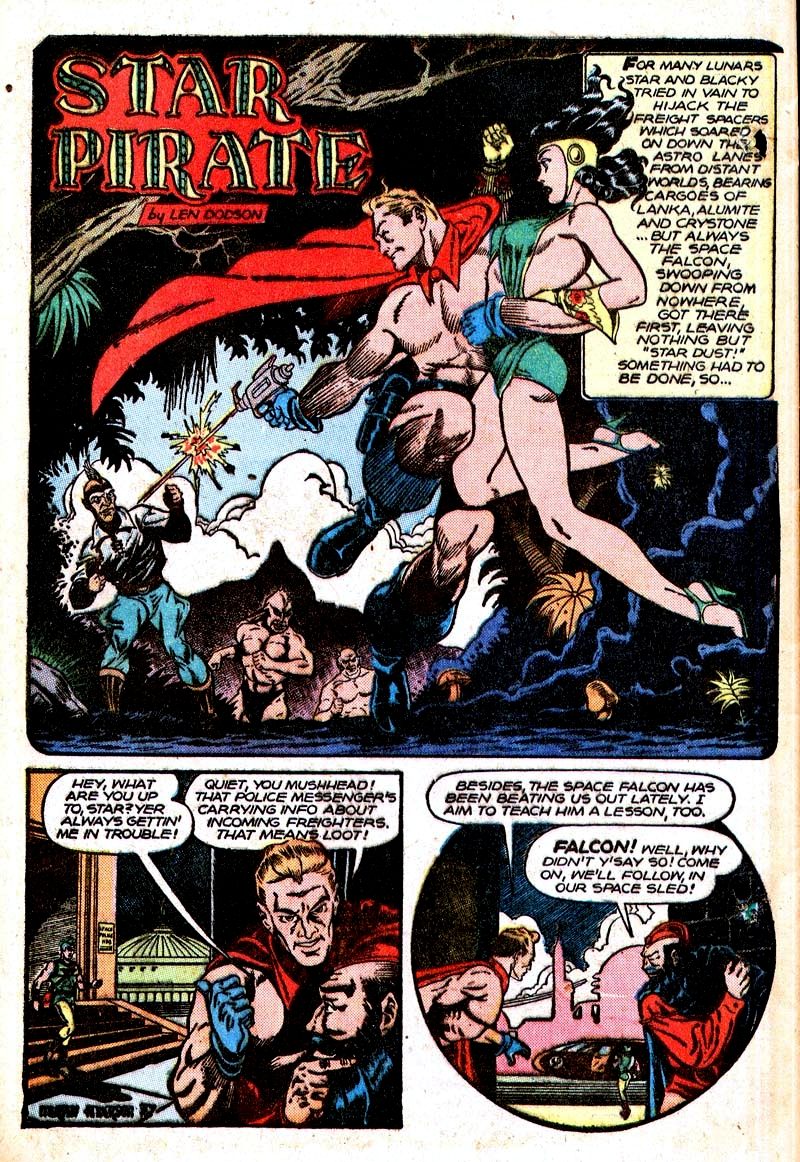
"Star Pirate" splash page, Planet Comics #50 (Sept. 1947), penciled and inked by Anderson

Anderson succeeded artist and co-creator Carmine Infantino on the superhero feature "Captain Comet" beginning with the story "The Girl from the Diamond Planet" in Strange Adventures #12 (cover-dated Sept. 1951). Years later, Anderson and writer John Broome created the feature "Atomic Knights" in Strange Adventures #117 (June 1960), which Anderson later described as his favorite assignment. Anderson and writer Gardner Fox launched the Hawkman series in May 1964 and introduced the Zatanna character in issue #4 (Nov. 1964). Comics historian Les Daniels noted that "Hawkman really took off when artist Murphy Anderson took over... Anderson came into his own with his elegantly ornamental version of the Winged Wonder." The Spectre was revived by Fox and Anderson in Showcase #60 (Feb. 1966) and was given his own series in December 1967. In the 1960s Anderson proposed that comics pages be drawn at 10x15 inches rather than the prevailing standard of 12x18 inches, which allowed two pages to be photographed at the same time, and this subsequently became the industry standard.

Anderson designed the costume of Adam Strange. With his frequent collaborator, penciler Curt Swan, the pair's artwork on Superman and Action Comics in the 1970s came to be called "Swanderson" by fans. He often hid his initials somewhere within the stories he inked. In the early 1970s, DC assigned Anderson, among other artists, to redraw the heads of Jack Kirby's renditions of Superman and Jimmy Olsen, fearing Kirby's versions were too different from the established images of the characters. In 1972, he drew Wonder Woman for the cover of the first issue of Ms. Magazine. In 1973, he established Murphy Anderson Visual Concepts, which provided color separations and lettering for comic books.

Beginning in 1967, Anderson also contributed for many years to PS Magazine, the preventive maintenance comics magazine of the U.S. Army, working under a childhood favorite artist, Will Eisner.

== Personal life ==
Anderson and his wife of 67 years, Helen, had two daughters, Sophie and Mary, and a son, Murphy III. Anderson died in Somerset, New Jersey on October 22, 2015, at the age of 89, of heart failure.

== Awards ==
Anderson's accolades include the 1962 Alley Award for "Best Inker"; a 1963 Alley for "Artist Preferred on Justice League of America"; 1964 Alleys for "Best Inking Artist" and for "Best Comic Book Cover" (Detective Comics #329, with penciler Carmine Infantino); 1965 Alleys for, again, "Best Inking Artist" and "Best Comic Book Cover" (The Brave and the Bold #61), as well as for "Best Novel" ('Solomon Grundy Goes On A Rampage') in Showcase #55, with writer Gardner Fox.

Anderson received an Inkpot Award in 1984 and was inducted into the Jack Kirby Hall of Fame in 1998 the Will Eisner Hall of Fame in 1999, and the Inkwell Awards Joe Sinnott Hall of Fame in 2013.

== Bibliography ==
Comics work as full artist (pencils and inks, except where noted) includes:

=== Aardvark-Vanaheim ===
- Cerebus Jam #1 (1985)

=== Aida-Zee Comics ===
- Aida-Zee #1 (inker, assisted by Dan Zolnerowich; also color separations) (1990)

=== Comico Comics ===
- Jonny Quest #9 (1987)

=== DC Comics ===
- Action Comics (Legion of Super-Heroes) #379 (inks over Win Mortimer pencils); (Superman) #393–424, 426–428, 430–433, 485, 544, 600, 700 (inks over Curt Swan) (1969–94)
- Action Comics Weekly #613–641 (inks over Curt Swan) (1988–89)
- Adventure Comics (Supergirl) #383 (inks over Win Mortimer); (Superboy) #453 (inks over John Calnan) (1969–77)
- Amazing World of Superman, Metropolis Edition (inks over Curt Swan) (1973)
- The Atom #1–11, 13 (inks over Gil Kane) (1962–64)
- The Atom and Hawkman #39–41, 43–44 (1968–69)
- Batman #254 (Robin) (inks over Dick Dillin) (1974)
- Batman: A Word to the Wise (inks over Curt Swan) (1992)
- The Brave and the Bold (Justice League) #28 (inks over Mike Sekowsky); (Strange Sports) #47 (inks over Carmine Infantino); (Starman / Black Canary) #61–62 (1960–65)
- DC Comics Presents #5, 8; #67–68 (inks over Curt Swan); #95 (inks over Richard Howell) (1979–86)
- DC Special Series (Flash (Jay Garrick)) #11 (inks over Kurt Schaffenberger) (1978)
- DC Super Stars (Superboy) #12 (inks over Curt Swan) (1977)
- Detective Comics (Elongated Man) #357, 359–360, 377; (Batgirl) #384–385, 388–389, 392–393, 396–397 (inks over Gil Kane ); (Robin) #390–391, 394–395 (inks over Gil Kane); (Batman) #431–432 (inks over Irv Novick and Bob Brown); (Jason Bard) #431, 433 (inks over Don Heck); (The Atom) #432 (1973); (Hawkman) #480 (1966–78)
- Falling in Love #118 (1970)
- The Flash #110–111, 114–115, 117–119, 121, 148–150, 152 (inks over Carmine Infantino); #195 (inks over Gil Kane), #200–204, 206–208 (inks over Irv Novick) (1959–71)
- From beyond the Unknown #7–8 (1970)
- Fury of Firestorm Annual #4 (inks) (1986)
- Girls' Love Stories #150 (inks over Werner Roth) (1970)
- Girls' Romances #149, 151 (1970)
- Green Lantern vol. 2, #1, 4, 9–10, 16, 21, 71, 73–74 (inks over Gil Kane); #137 (Adam Strange) (inks over Carmine Infantino) (1960–1981)
- Hawkman #1–21 (1964–67)
- Heroes Against Hunger #1 (inks over Carmine Infantino) (1986)
- House of Mystery #37 (full art); #212 (inks over John Calnan), #302 (inks over Curt Swan) (1955–82)
- House of Secrets #91 (1971)
- Korak, Son of Tarzan #52–56 (1973–74)
- My Greatest Adventure #42 (1960)
- Mystery in Space #2, 4, 7–17, 45–48; (Adam Strange) #56, 57, 63–70, 72, 74–83, 85, 90, 91 (inker) (1951–64)
- The New Teen Titans, vol. 2, (Tales of Tamaran) #15 (inks over Chuck Patton) (1985)
- Our Army at War #28, 31 (1954–55)
- Phantom Stranger #1, 4–6 (1952–53)
- Phantom Stranger, vol. 2, #4–5 (1969–70)
- Robotech Defenders #1–2 (inks over Judith Hunt); #2 (inks over Mike Manley) (1985)
- Secret Hearts #45 (1958)
- Secret Origins (Doll Man) #8; (Uncle Sam) #19; (Black Condor) #21 (full art); (The Flash) Annual #4 (inks over Carmine Infantino) (1986–87)
- Sensation Mystery #110–111, 113, 115–116 (1952–1953)
- Showcase (The Atom) #34–36 (inks over Gil Kane); (I-Spy) #50 (inks over Carmine Infantino); (Doctor Fate) #55–56; (Spectre) #60–61, 64 (1965–1966)
- Spectre #1; 6–8 (inks over Jerry Grandenetti) (1967–69)
- Star Spangled War Stories #28, 42 (1954–1956)
- Strange Adventures #9–11, 44, 53, 55, 94, 96, 99, 115, 119, 121–122, 124, 127–128, 131, 133, 135, 137, 139–140, 142–143, 145, 151–152, 154–155, 161, 227 (full art); #111, 124, 136 (inks over Mike Sekowsky); #125, 141–142, 146, 149, 163 (inks over Carmine Infantino); #130, 146, 148, 159 (inks over Gil Kane) (Captain Comet); #155, 162 (inks over Sid Greene) #12–44; (Atomic Knights) #117, 120, 123, 126, 129, 132, 135, 138, 141, 144, 147, 150, 153, 156, 160; (Adam Strange) #222 (inks over Gil Kane), 226 (1951–70)
- Strange Sports Stories #2 (inks over Curt Swan) (1970)
- Superboy #167–172, 175–184, 186–195, 197 (inks over Bob Brown); (Legion of Super-Heroes) #184, 188, 190 (inks over Dave Cockrum) (1970–73)
- Superboy & the Legion of Super-Heroes #245–246 (inks over Joe Staton) (1978)
- Superman #233–238, 241–244, 246–251, 253–270, 411, Annual #10 (inks over Curt Swan); #233 ("Fabulous World of Krypton"); (Note: In this issue, Anderson inked the Superman lead story (penciled by Curt Swan) as well as provided full art for a "The Fabulous World of Krypton" backup story.) #270 ("Private Life of Clark Kent"; full art); #243 (inks over Bob Brown); #246 (inks over Rich Buckler); #268 (inks over Dick Dillin) (1970–85)
- The Superman Family #186 (inks over Curt Swan) (1977)
- Superman's Pal Jimmy Olsen (full art) #129–130, 132; (Superman and Jimmy Olsen heads re-drawn over Jack Kirby layouts) #136–139, 141–145, 148 (1969–72)
- Superman: The Wedding Album #1 (inks over Kerry Gammill) (1996)
- Tales of the Unexpected #50 (1960)
- Tarzan (backup stories) #207, 209, 217–218 (1972–73)
- The Unexpected #116, 119, 122, 208 (full art); #118 (inks over John Calnan) (1970–81)
- Weird Worlds (John Carter of Mars) #1–3 (1972–73)
- Witching Hour #38 (1974)
- World of Krypton #1–2 (inks over Howard Chaykin) (1979)
- World's Finest Comics (Tommy Tomorrow) #121–122; (Super-Sons) #216, 221 (inks over Dick Dillin); (Superman and Batman) #217, 220 (inks over Dillin), 244–246 (inks over García-López, Swan & Schaffenberger), 256; (Hawkman) #256 (1961–79)

=== Dell Comics ===
- Men into Space (1960)

=== Image Comics ===
- Shadowhawk #9 (1993)

=== Marvel Comics ===
- Suspense #7 (1951)
- The Official Handbook of the Marvel Universe #19 (1987)

Preceded by n/a	Hawkman artist 1964–1967	Succeeded by Dick Dillin
Preceded by Mike Esposito	Superboy inker 1970–1973	Succeeded by Vince Colletta
Preceded by Mike Esposito	Action Comics inker 1970–1974	Succeeded by Vince Colletta
Preceded by Dan Adkins	Superman inker 1971–1973	Succeeded by Bob Oksner
Preceded by John Beatty	Action Comics Weekly inker 1988–1989	Succeeded by various
