= Tops in Science Fiction =

US pulp science fiction magazine

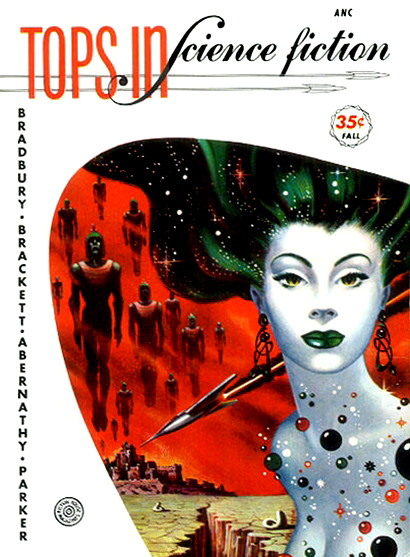
The second issue; cover artwork by Kelly Freas.

Tops in Science Fiction was an American pulp science fiction magazine launched in 1953. The publisher, Love Romances Publishing, created it as a vehicle to reprint stories from Planet Stories. It was unsuccessful and only lasted for two issues. Although it contained no original stories, it did print some original artwork, including some of Kelly Freas's early work. A British reprint edition appeared in the mid-1950s.

== Publication history ==
The early 1950s saw dramatic changes in the history of U.S. science fiction publishing. At the start of 1949, all but one of the major magazines in the field were in pulp format; by the end of 1955, almost all had either ceased publication or switched to digest format. Despite the rapid decline of the pulp market, several new science fiction magazines were launched in pulp format during these years; Tops in Science Fiction was one of the last of these. The publisher, Love Romances Inc., also published Planet Stories, and Malcolm Reiss, Planet's editorial director, decided to try to take advantage of the backfile of stories and artwork from Planet's 14 years of publication. He may have been inspired by the example of Fantastic Story Magazine, which was published by Standard Magazines as a vehicle to reprint their extensive backfile of science fiction. If so, he was evidently not aware that by 1953 Fantastic Story was not doing well financially.

The first issue was dated Spring 1953, and was edited by Jack O'Sullivan. The cover, by Alexander Leydenfrost, was reprinted from a 1942 issue of Planet Stories. The fiction included "Black Friar of the Flame" by Isaac Asimov, and "The Million Year Picnic", by Ray Bradbury—the first of his "Martian Chronicles" stories. Interior art included some of Kelly Freas' earliest work. The issue was only modestly successful, and on the advice of his distributor, who told Reiss that they were having trouble getting the magazine distributed, Reiss decided to switch to the digest format for the second issue: digests were starting to become more popular than the pulps, which would be almost completely gone from the market within only a couple more years. The second issue was dated Fall 1953; the cover, by Freas, illustrated "Lorelei of the Red Mist", by Bradbury and Leigh Brackett. Freas also did the interior illustrations for the story, and later commented that he was delighted by the results but felt he was "never quite able to repeat it. A hex, of course." Interior artists for the second issue also included Emsh; the fiction included stories by Fredric Brown and Horace Gold. However, this issue received only limited distribution, and Reiss decided against continuing with the magazine.

== Bibliographic details ==
Tops in Science Fiction's two issues were dated Spring and Fall 1953; the first in pulp format, and the second a digest. There was a single volume of two numbers. The publisher was Love Romances Publishing, based in Stamford, Connecticut. The magazine was priced at 25 cents for the pulp issue, and 35 cents for the digest issue. Both issues were 128 pages long. The first issue was edited by Jack O'Sullivan; the second by Malcolm Reiss.

A British reprint edition appeared, with three 128-page digest editions published by Top Fiction Ltd. These were released in Autumn 1954, Winter 1955 and Summer 1956, though none of them were dated. The first two reprinted stories from the first U.S. issue; the third reprinted material from the second U.S. issue. They were each priced at 1/6.

== Sources ==
- Ashley, Michael (1976). The History of the Science Fiction Magazine Vol. 3 1946–1955. Chicago: Contemporary Books, Inc. ISBN 0-8092-7842-1.
- Ashley, Mike (1985). "Fantastic Story Quarterly". In Tymn, Marshall B.; Ashley, Mike (eds.). Science Fiction, Fantasy, and Weird Fiction Magazines. Westport CT: Greenwood Press. pp. 249–250. ISBN 0-313-21221-X.
- Ashley, Mike (2000). The Time Machines:The Story of the Science-Fiction Pulp Magazines from the beginning to 1950. Liverpool: Liverpool University Press. ISBN 0-85323-865-0.
- Ashley, Mike (2005). Transformations:The Story of the Science-Fiction Magazines from 1950 to 1970. Liverpool: Liverpool University Press. ISBN 0-85323-779-4.
- Casebeer, E.F. (1985). "Tops in Science Fiction". In Tymn, Marshall B.; Ashley, Mike (eds.). Science Fiction, Fantasy, and Weird Fiction Magazines. Westport CT: Greenwood Press. pp. 675–677. ISBN 0-313-21221-X.
