= Henry C. Kiefer =

American artist from the Golden Age of Comic Books

- Born: Henry Carl Kiefer; April 15, 1890 Cincinnati, Ohio, U.S.
- Died: May 10, 1957 (aged 67) Bronx, New York
- Area: Artist
- Pseudonyms: De Keroset, A. De Keroset, de Kerosett, Carl Kief, Karl Kief, Karl Kiev, H. C. Kiefer, H. C.
- Notable works: Wambi; Classics Illustrated

Henry C. Kiefer (April 15, 1890 – May 10, 1957) was an American artist from the Golden Age of Comic Books. Best remembered for his contributions to the long-running comic book series Classics Illustrated, Kiefer was a prolific artist who drew features for just about every publisher of his era.

== Career ==
Kiefer trained with the Atelier Julian in Paris. His first professional work was as an illustrator in the pulp magazine industry.

By 1935, he was working in the burgeoning comics field, for a variety of studios and packagers, including the Chesler Studio (1937–c. 1940), the Iger Shop (c. 1939–c. 1953), the Sangor Studio (1942–1948), and Funnies Inc. (c. 1943–1955). During the period 1939–c. 1953, Kiefer rented workspace at Majestic Studios, while also occasionally doing work for them.

He began with art in features for National Comics Publications (DC Comics), Centaur Publications, and Fox Feature Syndicate. By the early 1940s he was illustrating comics features for Fiction House, Harvey Comics, Quality Comics, Novelty Press, and Parents Magazine Press. For Fiction House, he drew Wambi in Jungle Comics from 1940 to 1948. In 1940–1941, Kiefer drew the feature Spurt Hammond, human defender of the Planet Venus, for Fiction House's Planet Comics.

In the period 1947–1953, Kiefer was the main artist for many issues of Classic Comics and Classics Illustrated, and his work came to define the "look" of the series. For Classic Comics, he illustrated the second cover for The Prince and the Pauper, issue #29, cover for The Adventures of Sherlock Holmes, issue #33, and the first Classics Illustrated issue, The Last Days of Pompeii, issue #35. For Classics Illustrated, he drew the majority of at least 20 issues from the series, including Twenty Thousand Leagues Under the Seas, Around the World in 80 Days, The Adventures of Sherlock Holmes, and A Christmas Carol.

In the period 1949–1953, Kiefer worked for Youthful on a number of different Western comics titles. In the period 1951–1955, Kiefer worked for Trojan Magazines on such titles as Beware, Attack!, Crime Smashers, and Western Crime Busters.

Kiefer signed his work with a variety of aliases and signatures, including "de Kerosett," "H. C. K.," "H. C. Kiefer," "HC Kiefer," "HCK," "Henry Calr Kiefer," "Henry Carl Kiefer," "Kark Kief," and "Roy L. Smith." He was related to fellow comics artist A. D. Kiefer.

Kiefer died in 1957 at age 67.

== Bibliography ==
- Wing Brady in New Fun Comics (National/DC), 1935–1936)
- Just Suppose in New Fun Comics/More Fun Comics (National/DC), 1935–1937)
- Famous Poems Pictured in New Adventure Comics (National/DC), 1936–1937)
- Multiple features in Star Comics #1–2 (Centaur Publications, 1937)
- Liberty Lads in Champion Comics (Harvey Comics, 1939–1942)
- Sub Saunders in Fantastic Comics #1–17 (Fox Feature Syndicate, 1939–1941)
- Red Torpedo: Submariner Jim Lockhart in Crack Comics #1–20 (Quality Comics, May 1940–Jan. 1942)
- Spurt Hammond in Planet Comics #1–11 (Fiction House, 1940–1941)
- Parachute Patrol in Wings Comics (Fiction House, 1940–1942)
- Wambi in Jungle Comics (Fiction House, 1940–1948)
- Lion Boy in Hit Comics (Quality Comics, 1940–1942)
- Old Cap Hawkins' Tales in Blue Bolt (Novelty Comics, 1940–1942)
- Fearless Fellers in Blue Bolt (Novelty Comics, 1943–1944)
- Real Heroes (Parents' Magazine Press, c. 1941–c. 1946)
- True Comics (Parents' Magazine Press, early 1940s)
- It Really Happened (Standard/Better/Nedor, mid-1940s)
- Real Life Comics (Standard/Better/Nedor, mid-1940s)
- Heroic Comics/New Heroic Comics (Eastern Color Printing, mid-1940s)
- Shakespeare adaptations (D.S. Publishing, mid-1940s)
- Junior Rangers in Headline Comics #6–22 (Feature Publications, 1943–1946)
- Steel Fist in Blue Circle Comics (Rural Home, 1944)
- Musical Key Series in Key Comics (Consolidated, 1945–1946)
- The Arabian Knight in Treasure Comics #2–8 (Feature Publications, 1945–1946)
- Crime Patrol (EC Comics, 1948–1949)
- Gunfighter (EC Comics, 1948–1949)
- Saddle Justice (EC Comics, 1948)
- War Against Crime (EC Comics, 1949)
- Beware (Trojan Magazines, 1953–1955)
- Classic Comics / Classics Illustrated (Gilberton, 1947–1953):
  - The Adventures of Sherlock Holmes (A Study in Scarlet, The Hound of the Baskervilles) — #33 (January 1947)
  - The Last Days of Pompeii — #35 (March 1947)
  - The Swiss Family Robinson — #42
  - Great Expectations — #43 (November 1947)
  - Mysteries of Paris — #44
  - Twenty Thousand Leagues Under the Seas — #47
  - David Copperfield — #48
  - A Christmas Carol — #53 (November 1948)
  - Wuthering Heights — #59
  - Western Stories — #62 (August 1949)
  - The Man without a Country — #63
  - The Cloister and the Hearth — #66 (December 1949)
  - Julius Caesar — #68
  - Around the World in 80 Days — #69
  - The Oregon Trail — #72
  - The Lady of the Lake — #75 (September 1950)
  - The Prisoner of Zenda — #76
  - Joan of Arc — #78
  - Pudd'nhead Wilson — #93
  - King Solomon's Mines — #97
  - Bring 'Em Back Alive — #104
