= Detective Book Magazine =

American pulp detective fiction magazine

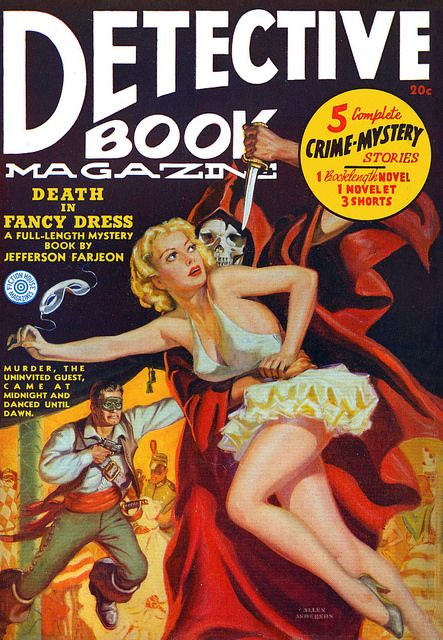
Detective Book Magazine volume 3, number 5 (Fall, 1940). Artwork by Allen Anderson.

Detective Book Magazine was an American pulp detective fiction magazine, published by Fiction House in 1930 to 1931 and from 1937 to 1952. Each edition of Detective Book Magazine contained the complete text of a detective novel. Most editions also contained one or more shorter detective fiction stories. Its main competitor was Street & Smith's Detective Story Magazine.

== Publication history ==
Detective Book Magazine was first published in April 1930 and monthly issues followed until the magazine was discontinued after the September 1931 edition.

The magazine was revived with the publication of an issue in 1937, and until 1952 the magazine was published as a quarterly (though in some years, only three issues were published, and in each of 1950 through 1952 only one issue was published). In total, 65 editions of Detective Book Magazine were published.
