= Thrilling Comics =

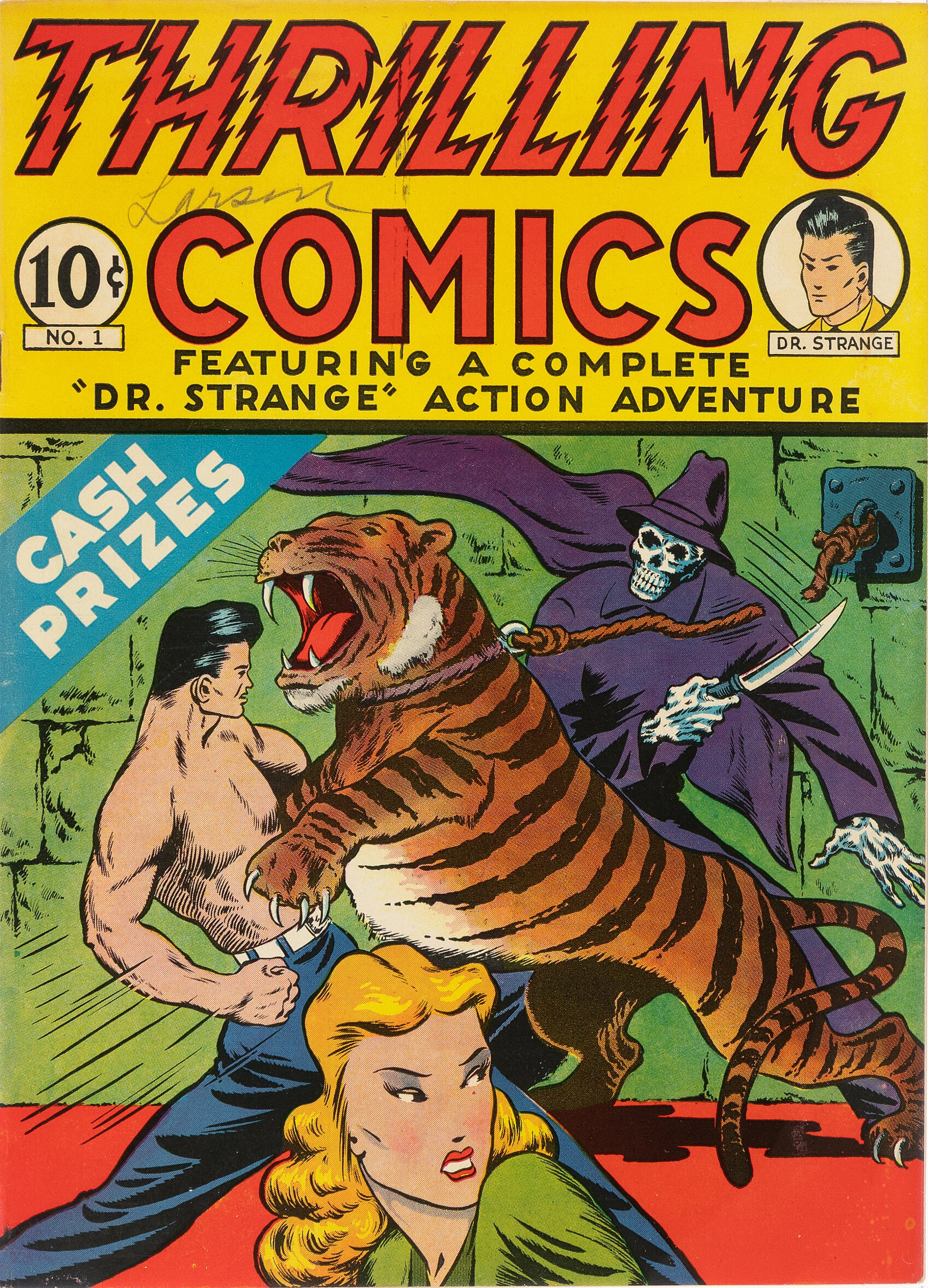
- Thrilling Comics #1

Publication information
- Publisher: Standard Comics
- Publication date: February 1940–April 1951
- No. of issues: 80
- Main character: See Characters

Thrilling Comics is the title of a comic book series published by Standard Comics for 80 issues from 1940 to 1951. The first issue is the first appearance of the comic-book character Doc Strange, who debuted in a 37-page origin story.

The "Thrilling Comics" title was used again in 1999 by DC Comics for one issue of the Justice Society Returns storyline.

== Characters ==
1. Thrilling Comics #1: Doc Strange
2. Thrilling Comics #2: Woman in Red (Nedor)
3. Thrilling Comics #3: The Ghost
4. Thrilling Comics #19: American Crusader
5. Thrilling Comics #56: Princess Pantha
