= Lily Renée =

Austrian-born American artist (1921–2022)

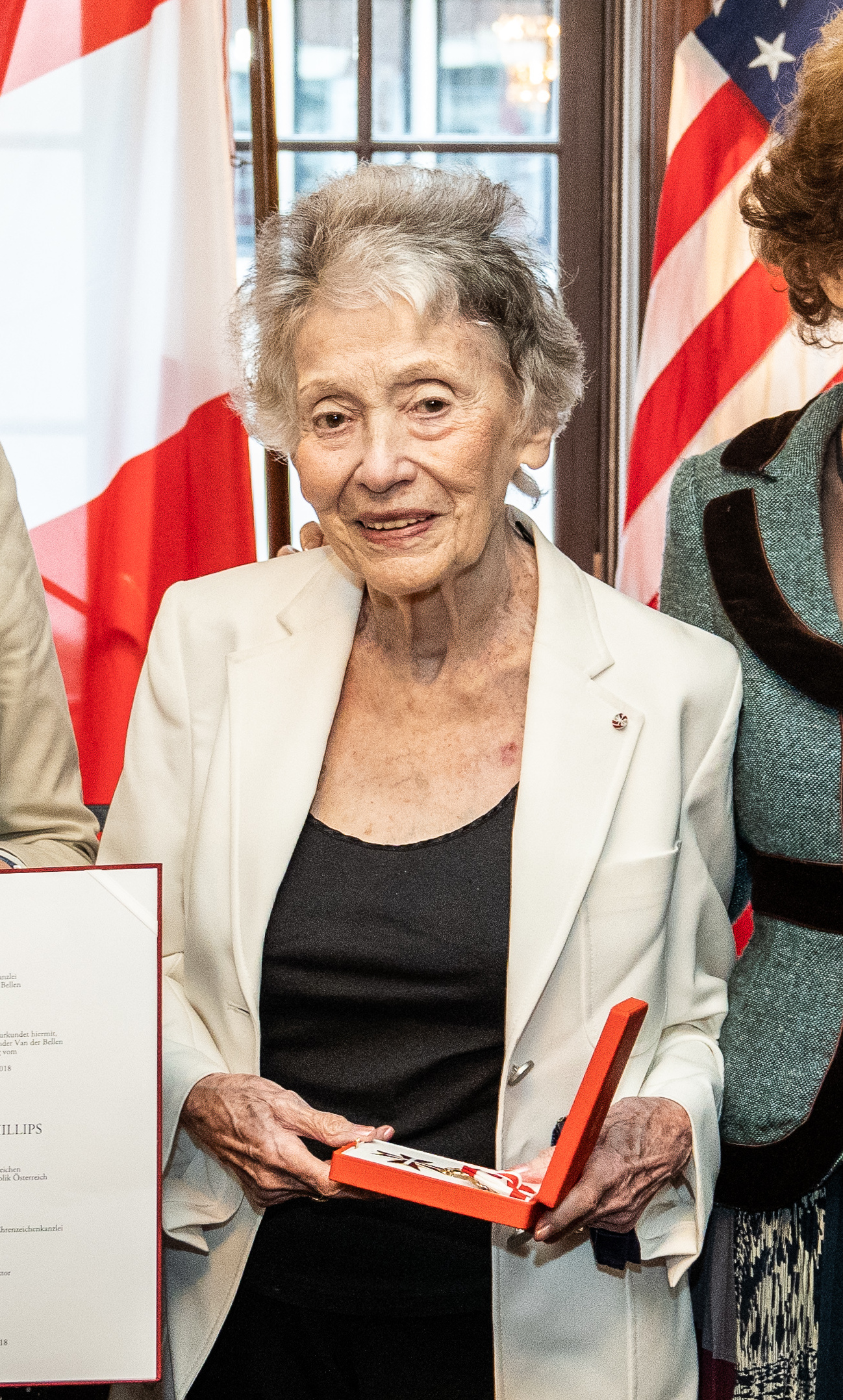
- Renée in 2018
- Born: Lily Renée Willheim; May 12, 1921 Vienna, Austria
- Died: August 24, 2022 (aged 101) New York City, U.S.
- Pseudonyms: L. Renée; Lily Renée; Reney
- Notable works: Jane Martin; The Werewolf Hunter; The Lost World; Señorita Rio; Abbott & Costello Comics
- Awards: Comic-Con International Hall of Fame

External image
- Lily Renée, Books of Wonder, New York City, 2011. Archived from the original on December 6, 2017.

Lily Renée Phillips (née Willheim; May 12, 1921 – August 24, 2022), often credited as L. Renée, Lily Renée, or Reney, was an Austrian-born American artist best known as one of the earliest women in the comic-book industry, beginning in the 1940s period known as the Golden Age of Comics. She escaped from Nazi-occupied Vienna to England and later New York City, whereupon she found work as a penciller and inker at the comics publisher Fiction House, working on such features as "Jane Martin", "The Werewolf Hunter", "The Lost World" and "Señorita Rio".

== Early life ==
Willheim was raised by well-to-do Jewish parents in Vienna, Austria, in the 1930s. Her father, Rudolf Willheim, worked as a manager at the Holland America line, a transatlantic steamship company. As a child, she frequented art museums and often drew as a hobby.

In 1939 or 1938, Willheim boarded the Kindertransport, leaving her parents behind in Nazi-occupied Austria. She arrived in Leeds, England, and lived there for two years, working as a servant, nanny, and candy striper while waiting for her parents' escape. When Willheim was 16, she received a letter from her parents saying they had emigrated to the United States. After joining them, living in a rooming house on West 72nd Street on Manhattan's Upper West Side, she took up art again. In a 2006 interview, she explained,

At that time, I was painting Tyrolean designs on wooden boxes, and then I got a job on the 46th floor of Rockefeller Center at Reiss advertising agency. They paid me 50 cents an hour to draw catalogs for Woolworth's. And so I was making some money too and I was going to night school, and then I think I told you that my mother saw an ad in the paper for comic artists? I went to [the comic-book publisher] Fiction House and I was hired on a trial basis, and they kept me. And then after a year-and-a-half, I was doing covers and I got a big Christmas bonus....

At some point, she studied at the Art Students League of New York and the School of Visual Arts.

== Career ==
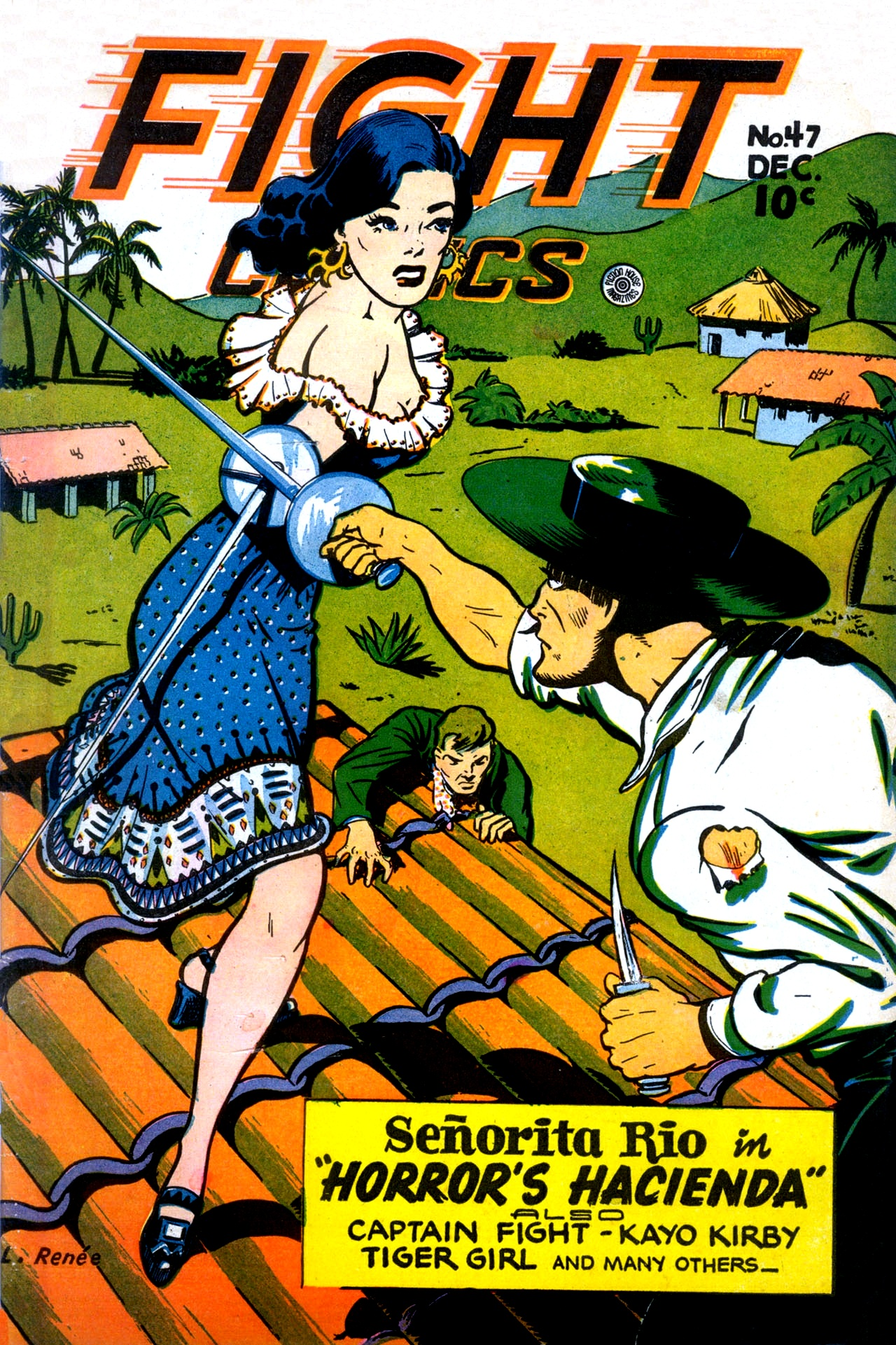
Fight Comics #47 (Dec. 1946), featuring Señorita Rio. Cover art by Renée.

At Fiction House, which had sought women to replace its male artists who had been drafted into World War II, she worked as a penciler and inker alongside other female comic illustrators and writers including Nina Albright and Fran Hopper.

By late 1942 or early 1943, by now using her first and middle names as a pen name, Renée was assigned the Fiction House feature "Jane Martin", starring a female pilot working in the male-dominated aviation industry. Her work on the feature, whose scripts are credited to the possibly pseudonymous "F.E. Lincoln", ran in Wings Comics #31-48 (March 1943 - Aug. 1944).

She also illustrated the feature "The Werewolf Hunter", with scripts credited to "Armand Weygand" and "Armand Broussard", in Rangers Comics #14-38, 40 (Dec. 1943 - April 1948). She said in 2011 she had worked with the feature's writer to steer it from lycanthropy toward more general gothic horror, concerned that she could not properly draw wolves. Her other work included the science-fiction feature "The Lost World", with scripts credited to "Thornecliffe Herrick", in Planet Comics #32-49 (Sept. 1944 - July 1947); and "Señorita Rio", about a South-of-the-border adventuress doing wartime espionage for the U.S. government, with scripts credited to "Morgan Hawkins" and appearing in Fight Comics #34-44, 47-51 (Oct. 1944 - Aug. 1947). While Señorita Rio, a.k.a. actress Rita Farrar, was designed by artist Nick Cardy in 1942, "Renée," writes historian Don Markstein, "was probably the one who became most strongly associated with the character."

In 1948, after Fiction House moved out of New York, Renée and her artist husband, Eric Peters, began working at St. John Publications. They shared penciling and inking duties on Abbott & Costello Comics, illustrating the majority of issues from #2-34 (April 1948 - Dec. 1955), and Renée additionally drew romance stories in issues of St. John's Teen-Age Diary Secrets and Teen-Age Romances. The two also drew comic books for the dairy company Borden, starring mascot Elsie the Cow.

After she left comics, Renée said she "did some children's books and I also wrote some plays", with at least one, the black comedy Superman in Sleep's Embrace, produced at Hunter College in Manhattan. She designed textiles for Lanz of California, and jewelry for Willy Woo.

In 2007, Renée attended Comic-Con International in San Diego, where Friends of Lulu nominated her to its Hall of Fame.

== Personal life and death ==
Renée had an early first marriage that was annulled. She later married Eric Peters, another Viennese refugee and a cartoonist whose work appeared in such glossy magazines as Collier's and The Saturday Evening Post. That marriage ended, and, she said in 2006, "My only real marriage was to Randolph Phillips," a politically active financial consultant who in the 1940s directed the American Civil Liberties Union's national committee for conscientious objectors, and in 1972 chaired the National Committee for Impeachment. The couple had a daughter, Nina, and a son, Rick. As of 2010, Renée had lived 40 years in an apartment on Madison Avenue in New York City. She celebrated her 100th birthday in May 2021, and died in New York City on August 24, 2022, at the age of 101.
