= Atlas Comics =

Atlas Comics may refer to:

- Atlas Comics (1950s), one of the two comic publishing companies that would be the forerunner of Marvel Comics
- Atlas/Seaboard Comics, founded by Timely/Atlas (1950s)/Marvel founder, a short-lived comic publisher that published under the Atlas Comics name and referred to as Atlas/Seaboard Comics

== See also ==
- Atlas (disambiguation)#Arts, entertainment, and media
