= Jumbo Comics =

Adventure anthology comic book

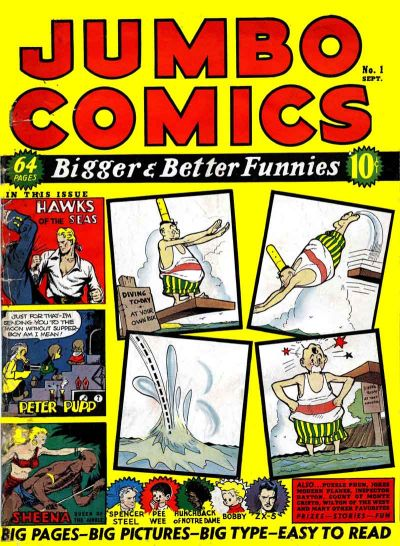
- Jumbo Comics #1 (Sept. 1938), cover artist(s) unknown

Publication information
- Publisher: Fiction House
- Schedule: Monthly
- Format: Tabloid (issues #1-8); standard (issues #9–167)
- Genre: Adventure anthology
- Publication date: Sept. 1938–Mar. 1953
- No. of issues: 167
- Main character(s): Sheena, Queen of the Jungle; Inspector Dayton; ZX-5, Spies in Action; Ghost Gallery; Sky Girl; Long Bow

Creative team
- Written by: Ruth Roche
- Artist(s): Jack Kirby, Bob Kane, Matt Baker, Mort Meskin, Lou Fine, Bob Powell, Mort Leav, Art Saaf, Dick Briefer, Lily Renée
- Editor(s): Malcolm Reiss (issues #1-35), John F. "Jack" Byrne (issues #49–77), Claude E. Lapham (issues #62–162)

Jumbo Comics was an adventure anthology comic book published by Fiction House from 1938 to 1953. Jumbo Comics was Fiction House's first comics title; the publisher had previously specialized in pulp magazines. The lead feature for Jumbo Comics' entire run was Sheena, Queen of the Jungle.

Notable creators who worked on Jumbo Comics include Jack Kirby (working under a variety of pseudonyms), Bob Kane, Matt Baker, Mort Meskin, Lou Fine, Bob Powell, Mort Leav, Art Saaf, Dick Briefer, Lily Renée, and Ruth Roche. Jerry Iger was Jumbo Comics' art director for its entire run.

== Publication history ==
By the late 1930s, Fiction House publisher Thurman T. Scott expanded the company from pulp magazines to comic books, an emerging medium that began to seem a viable adjunct to the fading pulps. Receptive to a sales call by Eisner & Iger, one of the prominent "packagers" of that time that produced complete comic books on demand for publishers looking to enter the field, Scott published Jumbo Comics #1 (Sept. 1938), just a couple months after Action Comics #1, under Fiction House's Real Adventures Publishing Company imprint.

Sheena, Queen of the Jungle appeared in that initial issue. The character had debuted in 1937 in the British magazine Wags. Indeed, all the material Eisner & Iger prepared for Jumbo Comics #1 (and the subsequent seven issues) had originally appeared in Wags, which was a tabloid-sized publication. For this reason, Jumbo Comics #1-8 were oversize (10-1/2" x 14-1/2") and exclusively in black and white. The name "Jumbo" was derived from the oversized publication size. With issue #9, the title reverted to standard Golden Age comic size (8-1/2" x 10-1/2") and was printed in color.

Bob Powell's first published comic-book art is tentatively identified as the uncredited three-page story "A Letter of Introduction", featuring the famed ventriloquist Edgar Bergen and his dummy, Charlie McCarthy, in Jumbo Comics #2 (Oct. 1938). Lou Fine's first published comics art was the strip "Wilton of the West" in Jumbo Comics #4 (Dec. 1938), signed with the house pen name "Fred Sande" (which strip originator Jack Kirby had used in previous issues).

Ultimately, Fiction House published 167 issues of Jumbo Comics from September 1938 to March 1953.

== Recurring features ==
Three features were featured in Jumbo Comics #1 that represent Jack Kirby's first comic-book work following his debut in Wild Boy Magazine:

- "The Diary of Dr. Hayward" — science fiction strip under the pseudonym "Curt Davis"; the strip was later continued by other artists until issue #9
- "Wilton of the West" — modern-West crimefighter strip as "Fred Sande"; the strip was later continued by other artists until c. issue #24
- Alexandre Dumas's The Count of Monte Cristo — serialized adaptation as "Jack Curtiss"

In addition, Dick Briefer produced a serialized adaptation (in five-page installments) of Victor Hugo's 1831 novel The Hunchback of Notre-Dame which ran in the first 8 issues.

Other recurring features:

Sheena, Queen of the Jungle — soon became the company's star character, and her adventures appeared in every issue of Jumbo Comics. Over the years the Sheena feature was worked on by notable creators like Bob Powell, Mort Meskin, and Matt Baker.

ZX-5 Spies in Action — ran for almost the entire run of the title.

Ghost Gallery — ran from issue #42 until the book was cancelled.

Inspector Dayton — another recurring feature that debuted in the first issue and ran until issue #60 (Feb. 1944).

Hawks of the Seas — period adventure continuing a story from Quality Comics' Feature Funnies #12, after Eisner-Iger and Quality had had a falling out; the strip lasted about ten issues.

Peter Pupp — originally by Bob Kane; ran for the first 25 issues.

Spencer Steel — ran for the first 12 issues; also appeared in Fiction House's Fight Comics.

Sky Girl — by Matt Baker; ran in issues #69-139 (November 1944–December 1952), with some of the later stories being reprints.

Long Bow — Western feature which ran in issues #141-160 (Nov. 1950–June 1952), roughly concurrent with Fiction House's Long Bow series (which ran nine issues from 1951–Winter 1952/1953).
