= Marcia Snyder =

- Born: Marcia Louise Snyder; May 13, 1907; Kalamazoo, Michigan
- Died: February 27, 1976 (aged 68); Lauderdale, Florida
- Known for: Cartoonist
- Notable work: Jungle Comics feature "Camilla"

Marcia Louise Snyder (sometimes spelled "Snider") was a comic book artist and newspaper cartoonist who worked for the Binder Studio, Timely Comics, Fawcett Comics, and Fiction House during the Golden Age of Comic Books.

== Biography ==
Snyder was born in Kalamazoo, Michigan on May 13, 1907. Her parents were Charles r. Snyder, a clerk in a shoe store, and Louise P. Underwood. She graduated from Western Normal High School in 1925.

Around the time she started working for Timely, she lived in Greenwich Village with her girlfriend, Mickey. At Fiction House, a publisher known for its female adventure heroes, she worked on such titles as "Camilla", a jungle girl feature in Jungle Comics. The 1930 Census lists Marcia's profession as an independent artist.

In the late 1970s, she "assisted" on the police comic Kerry Drake. What exactly that role entailed is unclear, though it is known that the original and credited creator was relying on ghostwriters and artists at that point.

She died on February 27, 1976, in Fort Lauderdale, Florida.
