= Fran Hopper =

- Born: Frances R. Deitrick; July 13, 1922 Maryland, US
- Died: November 29, 2017 (aged 95) New Jersey, US
- Area: Artist
- Notable works: Fiction House titles

External image
- Hopper in 2012, beside a 1940s portrait of her. Archived from the original on December 14, 2017.

Fran Hopper (July 13, 1922 – November 29, 2017), née Frances R. Deitrick, was an American comic-book artist active during the 1930s–1940s period known as the Golden Age of Comic Books. One of the earliest women in the field, she drew primarily for the publisher Fiction House on features, including "Jane Martin", "Glory Forbes", "Camilla", "Mysta of the Moon", and "Gale Allen and Her All Girl Squadron".

== Early life ==
Hopper was born in Maryland as the second oldest of five children of Stapelton C. and Emily R. Dietrick, and by age 7 was living in Rutherford, New Jersey. By 1940, the family was living in Nutley, New Jersey.

== Career ==
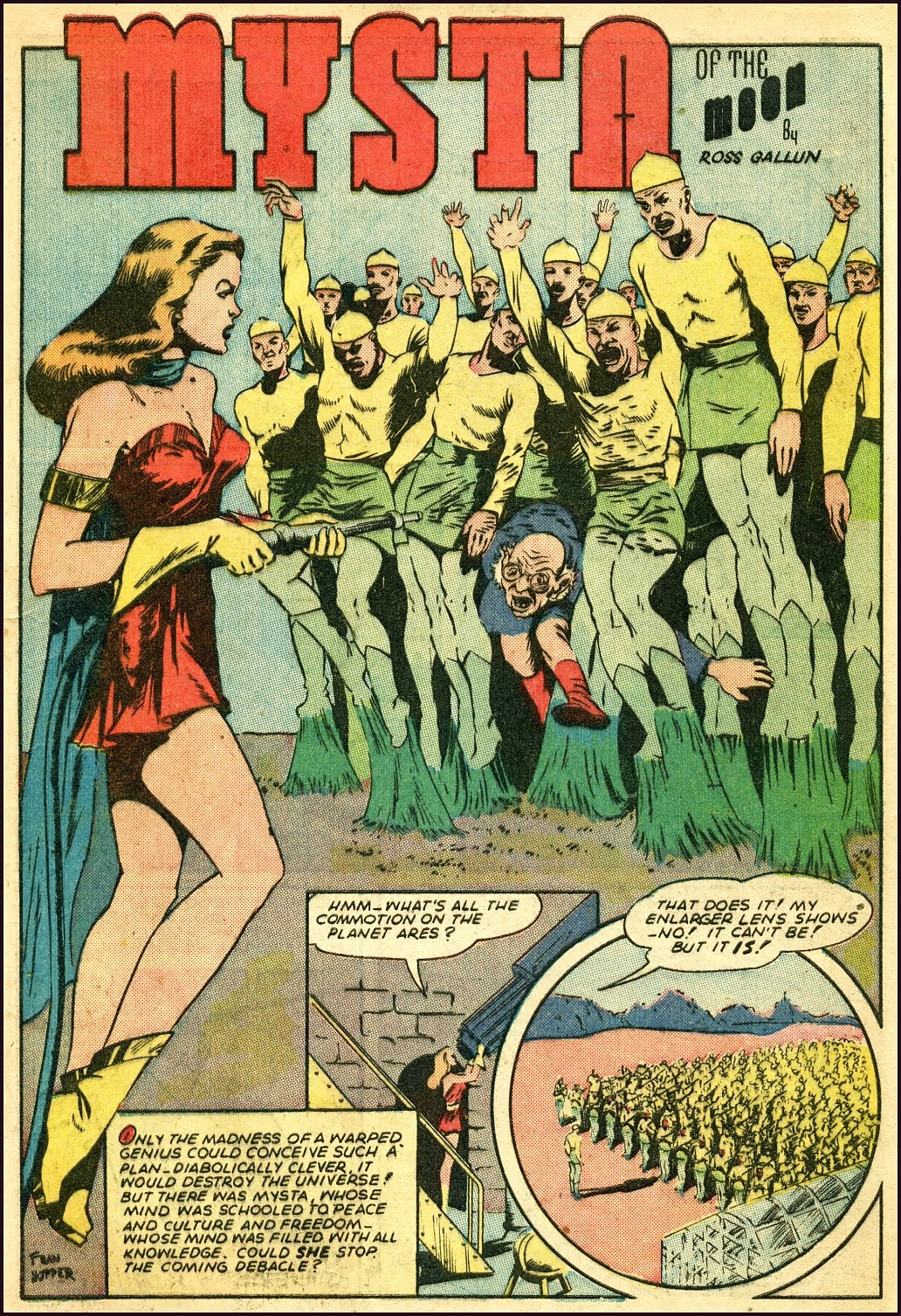
Signed Hopper page, "Mysta of the Moon", Planet Comics #37 (July 1945)

Hopper entered the comic-book field in 1943 through the S. M. Iger Studio, one of the era's "packaging studios" that produced outsourced comics for publishers. Because comics creators were not routinely credited at the time, Hopper's first comics work is undetermined. Her first confirmed credit, under the name Fran Dietrick, is as penciler and inker of the six-page science-fiction feature "Norge Benson" in publisher Fiction House's Planet Comics #24 (cover-dated May 1943). For the same publisher, she went on to do the humor feature "Private Elmer Pippin and the Colonel's Daughter" and the adventure feature "Glory Forbes" in Rangers Comics; the biographical feature "Yank Aces of World War II" in Wings Comics; the science-fiction feature "Gale Allen and the Girl Squadron" in Planet Comics; and the nature features "African Wild Life" and "Jungle Facts" in Jungle Comics.

Following her marriage, her first known work signed Fran Hopper is in two comics both cover-dated May 1944: "Monkey Business — The Tree-Folk of Africa" in Jungle Comics #53, and an illustrated text story plus the "Gale Allen" feature in Planet Comics #30.

She is most associated with three features. In Planet Comics, she quickly took over art for the science-fiction feature "Mysta of the Moon", created by pseudonymous writer Ross Gallun and artist Joe Doolin in issue #35 (March 1945), drawing it from #37–40, 42, 48–49 (July 1945 — July 1947). In Jungle Comics, she drew the jungle-girl adventure feature "Camilla", created by an unknown writer and artist C.A. Winter in issue #1 (Jan. 1940), from issue #70-92 (Oct. 1945 – Aug. 1947). And in Wings Comics, she drew the espionage feature "Jane Martin", created by pseudonymous writer Fred Hawk and an unconfirmed artist in issue #1 (Sept. 1940), from #67–84 (March 1946 – August 1947).

One source gives her last credited work as appearing in 1948, though the Grand Comics Database gives it as the "Jane Martin" story in Wings Comics #84 (Aug. 1947). As well, one source says Hopper drew some Patsy Walker teen-humor stories from Atlas Comics, the 1950s forerunner of Marvel Comics, but gives no specifics and no such work is listed at that database.

== Personal life ==
She married Dr. John B. Hopper II (October 3, 1920–Feb. 19, 2010) in 1944 and started signing her name as "Fran Hopper." They had three children: John B. Hopper III, Peter B. Hopper, and his twin sister Dr Anne R. Knutson. she married Dr Eric Knutson. Her daughter Anne had four children Jonathan knutson, Elizabeth knutson, Mark Knutson and David Knutson. Peter hopper had two sons Andrew and Tim. The family lived in Mendham, New Jersey, until 1955, when they moved to Chester, New Jersey, where they raised and showed Arabian horses. They returned to Mendham in 1955, then moved to Thornton, New Hampshire, in 1974. In 2006, Hopper and her husband moved to the retirement home The Pines in the Whiting section of Manchester Township, New Jersey.

Hopper died in New Jersey on November 29, 2017.

== Accolades ==
In 2000, Hopper was nominated to the Friends of Lulu Hall of Fame.

== Bibliography ==
- Jungle Comics (1940) #53–55, 58–62, 64, 66–68, 70–92
- Movie Comics (1946) #1
- Planet Comics (1940) #23–26, 28–42, 48–49, 68
- Rangers Comics (1941) #11–18, 25–27, 31
- Wings Comics (1940) #41–44, 46–47, 49, 67–84
