= Fiction House =

American publisher of magazines and comics

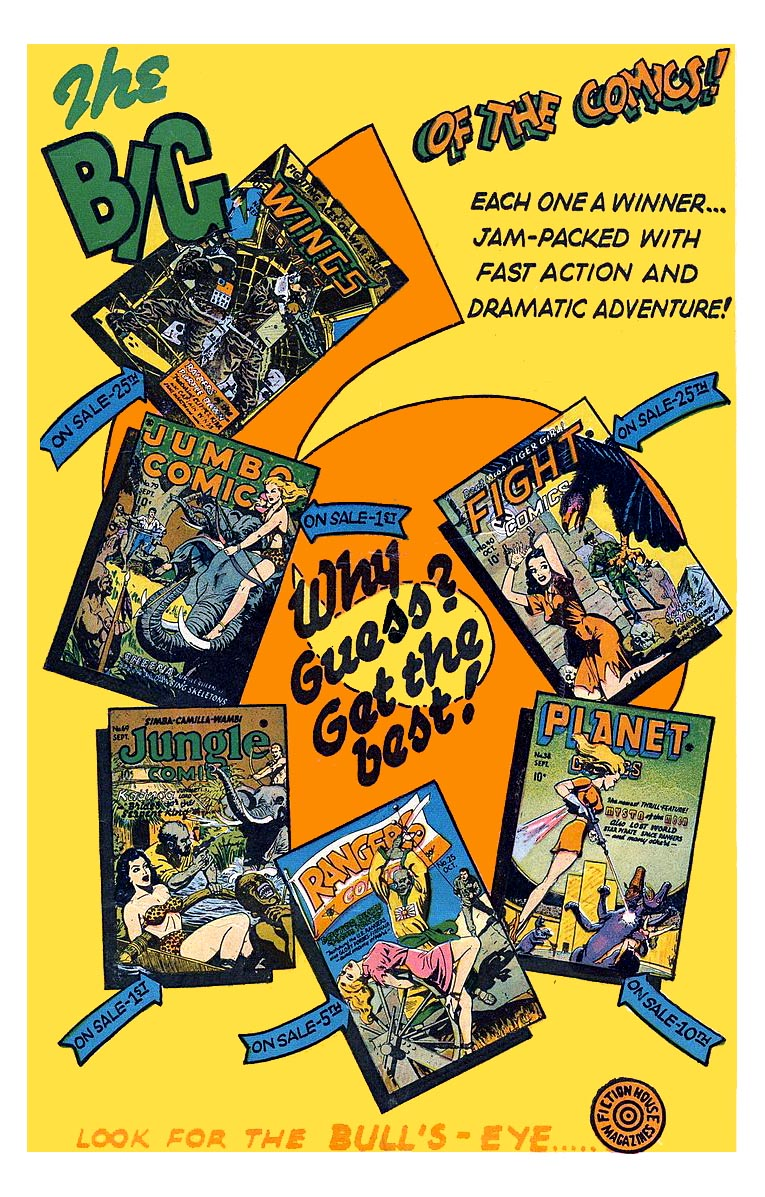
- House ad for "The Big 6 of the Comics!" advises, "Look for the Bull's-Eye..... Fiction House Magazines".
- Founded: 1921; 105 years ago
- Founders: John B. Kelly and John W. Glenister
- Defunct: 1955; 71 years ago
- Headquarters location: New York City
- Distribution: American News Company
- Key people: Thurman T. Scott
- Publication types: Comic books Pulp magazines
- Fiction genres: Aviation, detective, jungle, sports, Western, science fiction
- Imprints: Real Adventures Publishing Company; Love Romances Publishing

Fiction House was an American publisher of pulp magazines and comic books that existed from the 1920s to the 1950s. It was founded by John B. "Jack" Kelly and John W. Glenister. By the late 1930s, the publisher was Thurman T. Scott. Its comics division was best known for its pinup-style good girl art, as epitomized by the company's most popular character, Sheena, Queen of the Jungle.

== Leadership and location ==
The company's original location was 461 Eighth Avenue in New York City. At the end of 1929, a New York Times article referred to John B. Kelly as "head" of Fiction House, Inc., and a new location of 271 Madison Avenue.

In late 1932, John W. Glenister was president of Fiction House and his son-in-law, Thurman T. Scott, was secretary of the corporation. By the end of the 1930s Scott had risen to the title of publisher.

In January 1950, the Manhattan-based company signed a lease for office space at 130 W. 42nd Street.

== History ==
=== Pulp fiction ===
Fiction House began in 1921 as a pulp-magazine publisher of primarily aviation, Western, and sports pulps. According to co-founder John W. Glenister:

In association with J. B. Kelly, I put out our first fiction magazine devoted to adventure stories. That was in 1921. Within four years the magazine sold 150,000 copies an issue and we began four other outdoor magazines and several others."

During its first decade, Fiction House produced pulp magazines such as Action Stories, Air Stories, Lariat Stories, Detective Classics, The Frontier, True Adventures, Wings, and Fight Stories. Fiction House occasionally acquired other publishers' magazines, such as its 1929 acquisition of Frontier Stories from Doubleday, Doran & Co.

By the 1930s, the company had expanded into detective mysteries. In late 1932, however, in the midst of the Great Depression, Fiction House canceled 12 of its pulp magazines — Aces, Action Novels, Action Stories, Air Stories, Detective Book Magazine, Detective Classics, Fight Stories, Frontier Stories, Lariat, Love Romances, North-West Stories and Wings — with the stated goal of eventually reviving them.

After a hiatus, Action Stories resumed publishing through this period (lasting until late 1950). In addition, Fiction House relaunched its pulp magazines in 1934, finding success with a number of detective and romance pulp titles. The canceled pulps Fight Stories and Detective Book Magazine were revived in the spring 1936 and in 1937 respectively, with both magazines publishing continuously into the 1950s. Fiction House's first title with science fiction interest was Jungle Stories, which was launched in early 1939; it was not primarily a science fiction magazine, but often featured storylines with marginally science fictional themes, such as survivors from Atlantis. At the end of 1939 Fiction House decided to add an SF magazine to its lineup; it was titled Planet Stories, and was published by Love Romances, a subsidiary company that Fiction House created to publish the company's romance titles.

=== Comic books ===
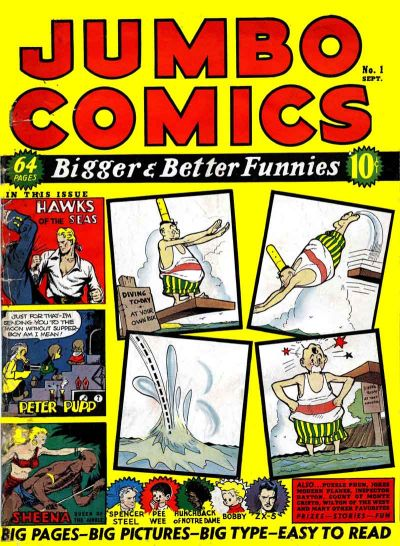
Jumbo Comics #1 (Sept 1938). Cover artist(s) unknown.

By the late 1930s, publisher Thurman T. Scott expanded Fiction House into comic books, an emerging medium that began to seem a viable adjunct to the fading pulps. Receptive to a sales call by Eisner & Iger, one of the prominent "packagers" of that time which produced complete comic books on demand for publishers looking to enter the field, Scott published Jumbo Comics #1 (Sept. 1938) under the company's Real Adventures Publishing Company imprint.

Sheena, Queen of the Jungle appeared in that initial issue, soon becoming the company's star character. Sheena appeared in every issue of Jumbo Comics (Sept. 1938 – April 1953), as well as in her 18-issue spin-off, Sheena, Queen of the Jungle (Spring 1942 – Winter 1952), the first comic book to title-star a female character. Other features in Jumbo Comics #1 included three by future industry legend Jack Kirby, representing his first comic-book work following his debut in Wild Boy Magazine: the science fiction feature The Diary of Dr. Hayward (under the pseudonym "Curt Davis"), the modern-West crimefighter strip Wilton of the West (as "Fred Sande"), and Part One of the swashbuckling serialization of Alexandre Dumas, père's The Count of Monte Cristo (as "Jack Curtiss"), each four pages long.

Jumbo proved a hit, and Fiction House would go on to publish Jungle Comics; the aviation-themed Wings Comics; the science fiction title Planet Comics; Rangers Comics; and Fight Comics during the early 1940s — most of these series taking their titles and themes from the Fiction House pulps. Fiction House referred to these titles in its regular house ads as "The Big Six," but the company also published several other titles, among them the Western-themed Indians and Firehair, jungle titles Sheena, Queen of the Jungle and Wambi, and five issues of Eisner's The Spirit.

Quickly developing its own staff under editor Joe Cunningham followed by Jack Burden, Fiction House employed either in-house or on a freelance basis such artists as Mort Meskin, Matt Baker (the first prominent African-American artist in comics), Nick Cardy, George Evans, Bob Powell, and the British Lee Elias, as well as such rare female comics artists as Ruth Atkinson, Fran Hopper, Lily Renée, and Marcia Snyder.

The popularity of Sheena led to numerous other Fiction House "jungle girls":

- Ann Mason (Jungle Comics) — the mate of Ka'a'nga, Jungle King; like Sheena, wears a leopard skin dress
- Jessie (Jungle Comics) — replaces Ann as the mate of Ka'a'nga
- Camilla, Wild Girl of the Congo (Jungle Comics) — wears a zebra skin dress
- Fantomah, Mystery Woman of the Jungle (Jungle Comics) — one comics' earliest super-powered heroines, created by Fletcher Hanks
- Princess Taj (Jungle Comics) — rides an elephant
- Tiger Girl (Fight Comics)
- Princess Vishnu (Fight Comics)

Feminist comics historian Trina Robbins, writes that:

...most of [Fiction House's] pulp-style action stories either starred or featured strong, beautiful, competent heroines. They were war nurses, aviatrixes, girl detectives, counterspies, and animal skin-clad jungle queens, and they were in command. Guns blazing, daggers unsheathed, sword in hand, they leaped across the pages, ready to take on any villain. And they did not need rescuing.

Despite such pre-feminist pedigree, Fiction House found itself targeted in psychiatrist Dr. Fredric Wertham's book Seduction of the Innocent (1954), which in part blamed comic books for an increase in juvenile delinquency. Aside from the ostensible effects of gory horror in comic books, Wertham cast blame on the sexy, pneumatic heroines of Fiction House, Fox Comics and other companies. A subsequent, wide-ranging investigation by the Senate Subcommittee on Juvenile Delinquency, coupled with outcry by parents, a downturn in comics sales, the demise of the pulps, and the rise of television and paperback novels competing for readers and leisure time, Fiction House faced an increasingly difficult business environment, and soon closed shop.

== List of Fiction House pulps ==
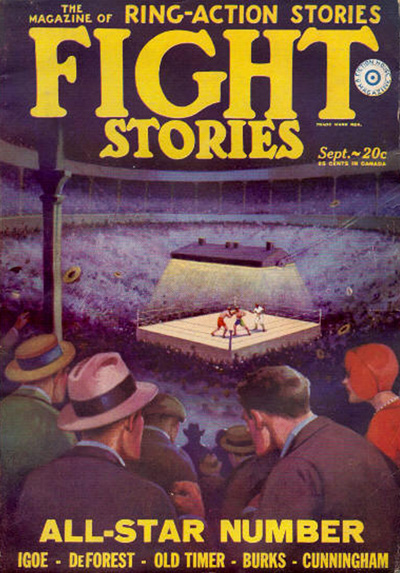
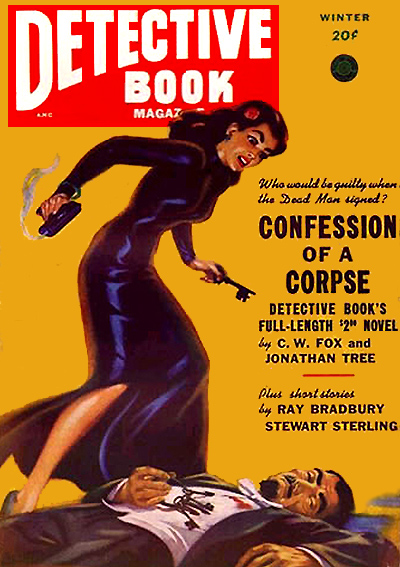
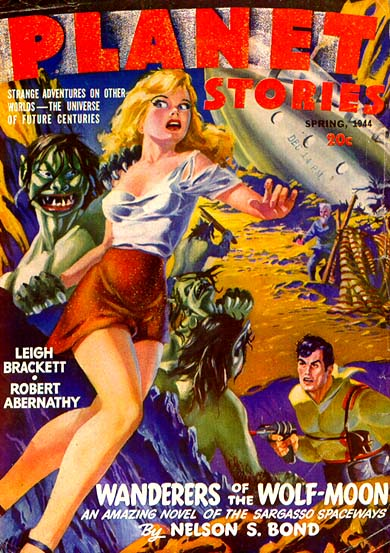
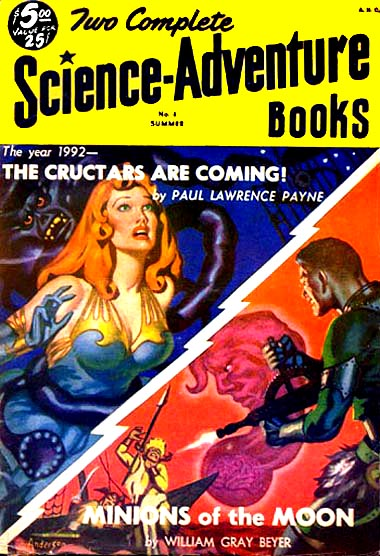
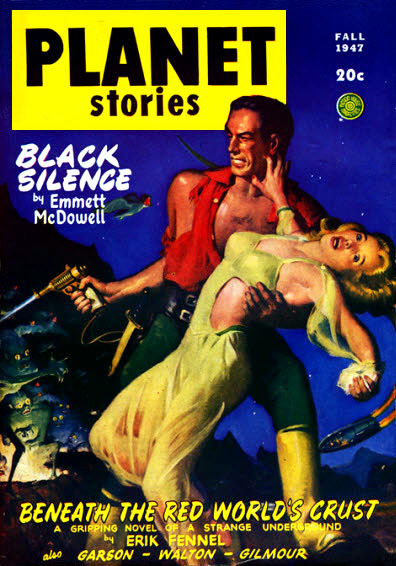
Fiction House pulp titles.
- Aces
- Action Novels
- Action Stories (225 issues, September 1921 - Fall 1950)
- Air Stories
- Detective Book Magazine (65 issues, Apr. 1930–Sept. 1931; 1937–Winter 1952/1953)
- All Adventure Action Novels
- All-American Football Magazine
- Baseball Stories
- Basketball Stories
- Black Aces
- Bull's-Eye Detective
- Bull's-Eye Sports
- Bull's-Eye Western Stories
- Civil War Stories
- Detective Classics
- Fight Stories (47 issues, June 1928 – May 1932; 59 issues, Spring 1936 - Spring 1952)
- Football Action
- Football Stories
- Frontier Stories
- George Bruce's Aces (Glen-Kel)
- George Bruce's Air Novels
- Illustrated Football Annual
- Jungle Stories
- Lariat
- Love Romances
- North-West Romances
- North-West Stories
- Planet Stories (71 issues, Dec. 1939 - June 1955)
- Soldier Stories
- Tops in Science Fiction (2 issues, Spring–Fall 1953) — vehicle to reprint stories from Planet Stories
- True Adventures
- Two Complete Detective Books (Real Adventure)
- Two Complete Science-Adventure Books (11 issues, 1950–1954)
- Two Western Books
- Two Western Romances
- Wings (133 issues [11+ volumes], Jan. 1928–Spring 1953)

== List of Fiction House comic books ==
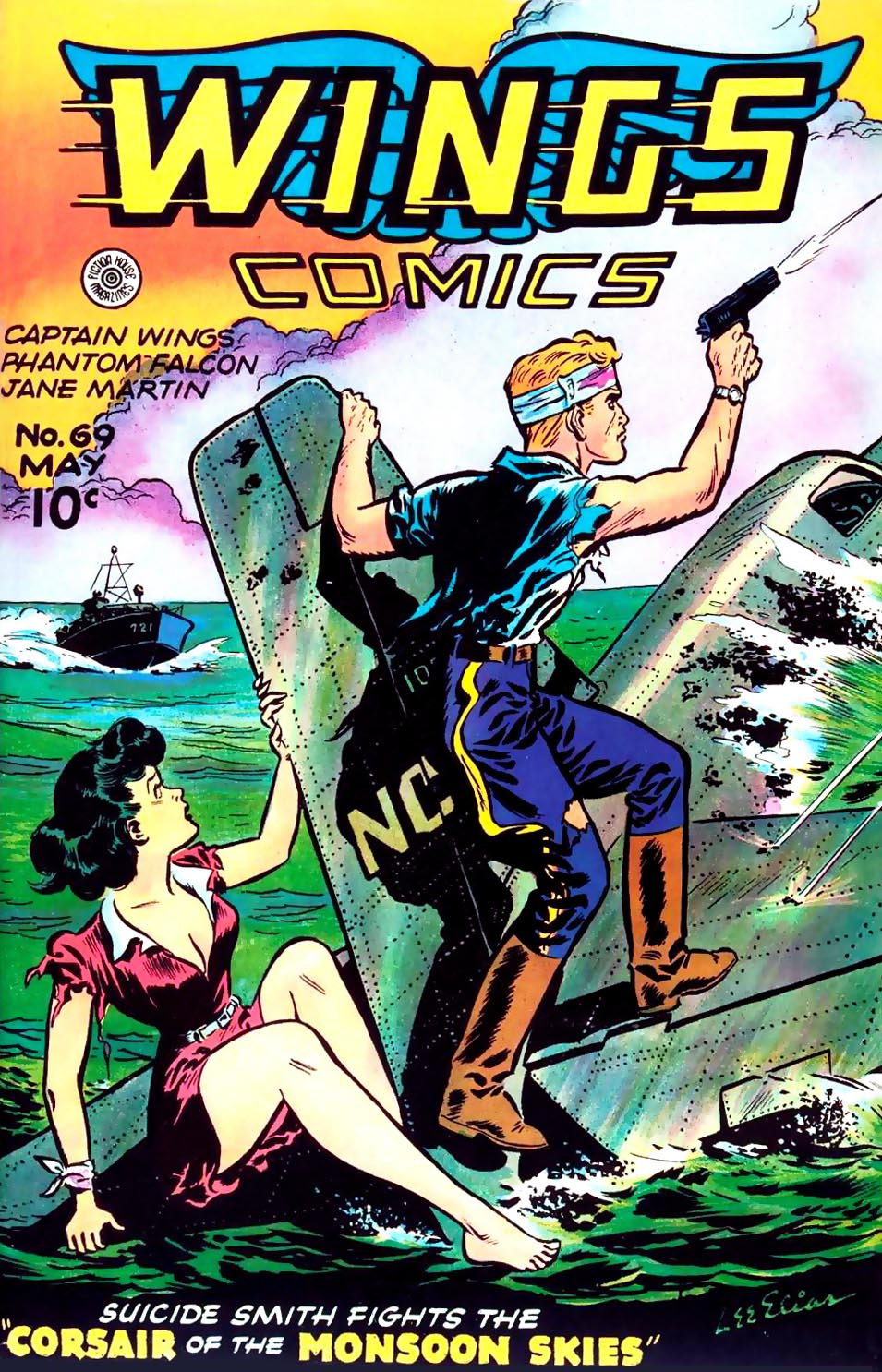
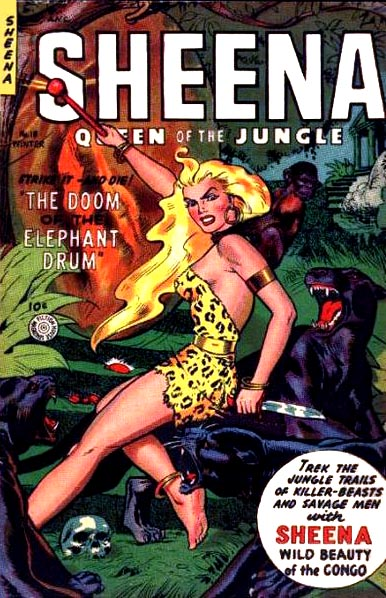
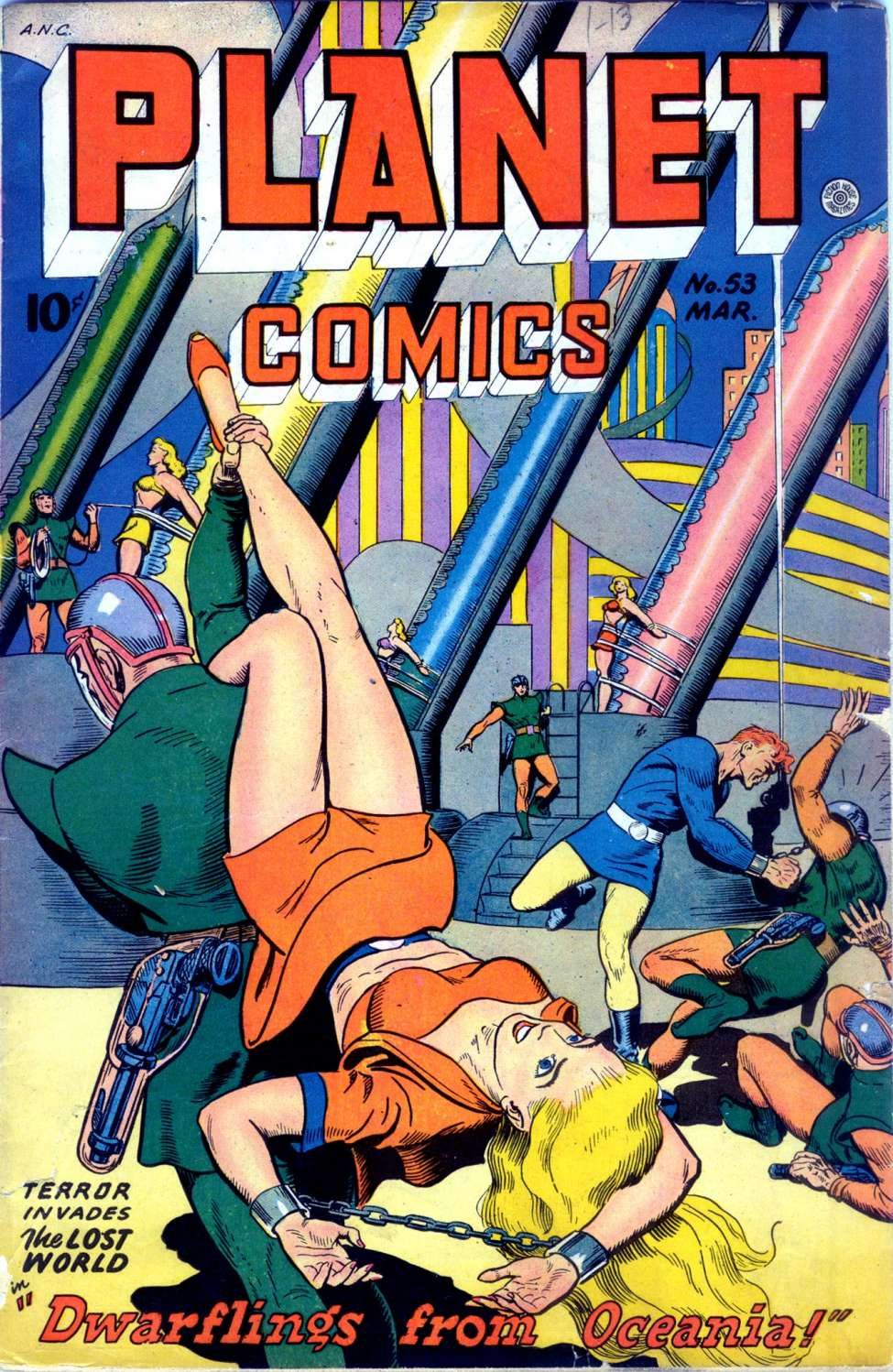
Typical cover art from Fiction House.

=== "The Big Six" ===
- Fight Comics (86 issues, Jan. 1940–[Jan.] 1954)
- Jumbo Comics (167 issues, Sept. 1938–Mar. 1953)
- Jungle Comics (163 issues, Jan. 1940–Summer 1954)
- Planet Comics (73 issues, Jan. 1940–Winter 1953)
- Rangers of Freedom Comics / Rangers Comics (69 issues, October 1941–Winter 1953)
- Wings Comics (124 issues, Sept. 1940–1954)

=== Other titles (selected) ===
- 3-D Circus (1 issue, 1953)
- Cowgirl Romances (12 issues, 1950–Winter 1952/1953)
- The First Christmas (1 issue, 1953; 3-D)
- Ghost Comics (11 issues, 1951–1954)
- Indians (17 issues, 1950–1953)
- Ka'a'nga, Jungle King (20 issues, Spring 1949–Summer 1954)
- Long Bow (9 issues, 1951–Winter 1952/1953)
- Man O' Mars (1 issue, 1953)
- Movie Comics (4 issues, Dec. 1946–1947)
- Pioneer West Romances / Firehair (11 issues, Spring 1950–Spring 1952)
- Sheena, Queen of the Jungle (18 issues, Spring 1942–Winter 1952/1953)
- The Spirit (5 issues, 1952–54)
- Wambi, Jungle Boy (18 issues, Spring 1942–Winter 1952)
