= Crack Comics =

Publication information
- Publisher: Quality Comics
- Schedule: various
- Format: Anthology
- Genre: crime, superhero, humor
- Publication date: May 1940 – Sept. 1949
- No. of issues: 62
- Main character(s): The Clock, Black Condor, Captain Triumph, Alias the Spider, Madame Fatal, Jane Arden, Molly the Model, Red Torpedo

Creative team
- Artist(s): Alfred Andriola, George Brenner, Gill Fox, Jack Cole, Paul Gustavson, Klaus Nordling, Art Pinajian
- Editor(s): Ed Cronin, John Beardsley, Gill Fox, George Brenner

Crack Comics is an anthology comic book series published by Quality Comics during the Golden Age of Comic Books. It featured such characters as The Clock, Black Condor, Captain Triumph, Alias the Spider, Madame Fatal, Jane Arden, Molly the Model, and Red Torpedo. The title "crack" referred to "being at the top of one's form", like a "crack sharpshooter".

Notable contributors to Crack Comics included Alfred Andriola, George Brenner, Gill Fox, Jack Cole, Paul Gustavson, Klaus Nordling, and Art Pinajian.

Quality Comics published 62 issues of Crack Comics from 1940 to 1949; the title was temporarily revived in 2011, when the Next Issue Project published issue "#63".

== Publication history ==
Crack Comics #5 (Sept. 1940), first use of the "Quality Comic Group" logo (to right of "COMICS"). Cover art by Gill Fox.

Crack Comics started off as a monthly anthology of 68 pages, often with as many as 15 features. At first edited by Ed Cronin, much of its material was originally "packaged" by the Eisner and Iger Studio. "The Clock", as well as such newspaper strip reprints as "Rube Goldberg's Side Show", "Jane Arden", and "Ned Brant", moved over from Quality's Feature Comics.

The first use of the publisher name "Quality Comic Group" was on the cover of Crack Comics #5 (Sept. 1940).

With issue #26 (Nov. 1942), at the height of World War II, the title dropped down to a bi-monthly schedule due to wartime paper shortages; with issue #33 (Spring 1944) it became quarterly, also reducing its page-count to 60. It was around this time that publisher Arnold dropped Eisner & Iger as a "packager" and began producing much of the material in-house. The syndicated newspaper strip reprints "Jane Arden" and "Ned Brant" disappeared during this period, as well as such recurring features as "Black Condor", "Don Q", and "Snappy".

Cartoonist George Brenner became editor of Crack Comics with issue #31 (Oct. 1943) (Cronin having left the post in Feb. 1942), a few issues before Brenner's character The Clock stopped appearing in the book's pages. Beginning with issue #42 (May 1946) the title went back to a bimonthly schedule, which it maintained until its cancellation with issue #62 (during this time, the title also gradually reduced its page-count from 60 to 52 to 36). Brenner stayed on as editor almost to the end, leaving the post after issue #61 (July 1949).

=== Crack Western and Jonesy ===
As comics readers' tastes changed in the years following World War II, Quality publisher Arnold responded. Starting with issue #63 (Nov. 1949), Crack became a Western comic, changing its name to Crack Western. This format lasted 22 issues until #84 (May 1953), when the title changed again, to Jonesy. Jonesy published one issue with the old numbering system and then restarted (from #2), publishing until issue #8 (Oct. 1954), when it was cancelled for good.

=== Next Issue Project ===
Following the demise of Crack Comics and later the publisher itself, many of Quality Comics' characters lapsed into the public domain. In November 2011, as part of editor Erik Larsen's "Next Issue Project", Image Comics published Crack Comics "#63", containing the following stories:

- Captain Triumph, written and penciled by Alan Weiss
- The Space Legion, written and illustrated by Chris Burnham
- The Clock, written and illustrated by Paul Maybury
- Molly the Model, written and illustrated by Terry Austin
- Alias the Spider, written and illustrated by Adam McGovern and Paolo Leandri
- Spitfire, written and illustrated by Herb Trimpe
- Slap Happy Pappy, written and illustrated by Joe Keatinge
- Hack O'Hara (with a cameo by the Space Legion), written and illustrated by Erik Larsen
- Red Torpedo, written and illustrated by B. Clay Moore, Frank Fosco, and Erik Larsen

== Recurring features ==
- The Clock: Moving over from Feature Comics, George Brenner's the Clock was the cover feature of Crack Comics #1, alternating cover appearances with the Black Condor until issue #19. He was a regular feature in the title — usually as the final story in each issue — until his last appearance, in issue #35 (Autumn 1944). The Clock's spot was taken over by Floogy the Fiji, a jungle comics feature which lasted from issue #36 (Winter 1944) until issue #59 (Mar. 1949).
- Black Condor: A mystery man with the power of flight, the character's adventures were originally written by Will Eisner and drawn by Lou Fine. The Black Condor was the lead feature of Crack from issue #1–26, and a regular feature until issue #31 (Oct. 1943).
- Lee Preston of the Red Cross: Newspaper strip reprints of Lee Preston, a heroic Red Cross nurse, and her friend Rick Royce, were a feature from issues #1–9 (Jan. 1941), when the strip was replaced by Paul Gustavson's Tor the Magic Master. Jim Slade was a photojournalist whose superhero persona was a backward-speaking magician. This feature lasted from issue #10 (Feb. 1941) until issue #26 (Nov. 1942). Beginning with issue #27 (Jan. 1943), Tor's spot was taken by Alfred Andriola's Captain Triumph. Stories of the merged twins (one alive, one dead) who formed the Golden Age superhero were a recurring item — mostly as the cover feature — through to Crack Comics final issue, #62.
- Alias the Spider: Paul Gustavson's crime-fighting bowman was a regular feature in Crack from issue #1–29 (May 1943), eventually replaced by Bernard Dibble's humor feature Beezy Bumble. Beezy lasted through the rest of Crack Comics' run, ending with issue #62.
- Molly the Model: Bernard Dibble's one-page humor strips were featured in every issue of Crack Comics from #1–62.
- Eric Vale: Two-page text stories of the adventuresome pilot of a black plane were a regular feature, only missing a few issues, from #1–50 (Sept. 1947).
- Slap Happy Pappy: Created by Quality editor Gill Fox, most of the hillbilly character's humorous one-page strips were done by Jack Cole, and were a regular feature from issues #1–49 (July 1947).
- Madame Fatal: Art Pinajian's cross-dressing detective debuted in issue #1, continuing as a feature until issue #22 (Mar. 1942), when it was replaced by Pen Miller, who came over from National Comics. Klaus Nordling's cartoonist/detective and his "Chinese houseboy Chop Chu" solved crimes and helped the war effort, lasting as a regular feature from issue #23 (May 1942) until issue #60 (May 1949).
- Red Torpedo: Submariner Jim Lockhart, created by Henry C. Kiefer, first appeared in Crack Comics #1 and was a regular feature until issue #20 (Jan. 1942), when he was replaced by Hack O'Hara. O'Hara was a tough New York taxi driver who used his muscles to take down criminals. Hack's stories, illustrated by Witmer Williams, were featured from #21 (Feb. 1942) through issue #62.
- Space Legion: Vernon Henkel's science fiction adventures starring Rock Braddon and Commander Crosby were a regular feature from issues #1–18 (Nov. 1941), replaced by Henkel's own Don Q: Don was a crime-fighter whose secret identity was a diplomatic courier for the American government. His adventures appeared in issues #19 (Dec. 1941)–26 (Nov. 1942).
- Wizard Wells: Harry Campbell's Wells was a former All-American athlete and a talented inventor who used science to outwit crooks. Wells' sidekicks included Tug, a punch-drunk jack-of-all-trades and Wells' would-be girlfriend Mary Perry. Wells was featured in issues #1–14 (July 1941), when he was replaced by Al McWilliams' Spitfire. The adventures of heroic fighter pilot Tex Adams lasted from issue #15 (Aug. 1941) until issue #27 (Jan. 1943). Spitfire was in turn replaced by Al Stahl's Inkie, who lasted as a feature from #28 (Mar. 1943) until issue #60 (May 1949).
- Rube Goldberg's Side Show: Reprints of the cartoonist's newspaper strips were a regular two-page feature in every issue from #1–40 (Winter 1945).
- Jane Arden: Reprints of the popular newspaper strip featuring a spunky gal reporter were a regular Crack Comics feature from issues #1–25 (continuing the tradition of Feature Comics #21-31).
- Ned Brant: A regular feature from issues #1–25 (Sept. 1942), the sports-related stories were syndicated newspaper strip reprints by writer Robert Zuppke and artist Walt Depew.
- Snappy: Arthur Beeman's one-pager humor strips debuted in issue #5 (Sept. 1940), lasting until #26 (Nov. 1942).

Other characters of note who appeared in Crack Comics included Batch Bachelor, Biff Banks, Black Shark, Dewey Drip, Kiki Kelly, and Yankee Guerilla.
