= Next Issue Project =

- Cover of Next Issue Project 1 (Fen 2008 Image Comics), art by Erik Larsen

Publication information
- Publisher: Image Comics
- Schedule: Irregular
Title(s)
Fantastic Comics #24
Silver Streak Comics #24
Crack Comics #63
Speed Comics #45
- Formats: Original material for the series has been published as a set of one-shot comics.
- Genre: Science fiction, superhero
- Publication date: February 2008

The Next Issue Project is a series of American comic-book anthology one-shots published by Image Comics beginning in February 2008. The multi-title project, edited by Erik Larsen, creator of Savage Dragon, features comic book characters that have fallen into the public domain.

The premise behind the series, according to Larsen, is:

... for any fan of comics, not just fans of Golden Age books. Often, the promise of Golden Age comics—where creators were making up the rules as they went along and were blazing new trails—was more exciting than the reality..., where creators were essentially mimicking some of the same dull formulaic writing found in other mediums at the time. Everyone who contributes to [the Next Issue Project] was intent on fulfilling the promise of the Golden Age and delivering a book that was more than a mere homage, but also a thrilling glimpse of what comics could be—if only creators were allowed to run wild with the characters they were handed!

== Publication history ==
Each issue of the Next Issue Project utilizes features from a title published during the 1930s and 1940s period historians and fans call the Golden Age of Comic Books, with similar dimensions and page count, both larger than the modern-day standard. Each issue continues the name and numbering of each title.

The first issue, Fantastic Comics #24 came out in February 2008. It was followed by Silver Streak Comics #24 in December 2009 and later Crack Comics #63.

== Issues ==
=== Fantastic Comics #24 ===
Continuing from Fox Feature Syndicate's Fantastic Comics. This issue was released on February 13, 2008. It contained the following stories:

- Samson, written and illustrated by Erik Larsen
- Flip Falcon, written by Joe Casey and illustrated by Bill Sienkiewicz, with colors by Erik Larsen and lettering by Chris Eliopoulos
- Golden Knight, co-written and illustrated by Thomas Yeates and co-written by Bryan Rutherford, with colors by Erik Larsen
- Yank Wilson, written and illustrated by Andy Kuhn, with lettering by Thomas Mauer
- Space Smith, written and illustrated by Tom Scioli
- Captain Kidd, co-written and illustrated by Jim Rugg and co-written by Brian Maruca
- Professor Fiend, written and illustrated by Fred Hembeck, with colors by Erik Larsen
- Stardust the Super Wizard, written by Joe Keatinge and illustrated by Mike Allred, with colors by Laura Allred and lettering by Van Nunez
- Sub Saunders, written and illustrated by Ashley Wood
- a prose piece featuring Carlton Riggs by B. Clay Moore with illustration by Jason Latour

=== Silver Streak Comics #24 ===
Continuing from Lev Gleason Publications' Silver Streak Comics. Released in December, 2009. It contained the following stories:

- Daredevil, written and illustrated by Erik Larsen
- Silver Streak, written and illustrated by Paul Grist, with colors by Erik Larsen
- Kelly the Cop, written and illustrated by Joe Keatinge, with colors by Erik Larsen
- The Claw, written and illustrated by Michael T. Gilbert
- Captain Battle, written by Steve Horton and illustrated by Alan Weiss, with colors by Derek Muthart and lettering by John Lowe

=== Crack Comics #63 ===
Continuing from Quality Comics' Crack Comics. This issue was released on November 2, 2011. It contained the following stories:

- Captain Triumph, written and penciled by Alan Weiss, inked by Jim Fern, with colors by Lovern Kindzierski and lettering by John Workman
- The Space Legion, written and illustrated by Chris Burnham
- The Clock, written and illustrated by Paul Maybury
- Molly the Model, written and illustrated by Terry Austin
- Alias the Spider, written and illustrated by Adam McGovern and Paolo Leandri, with colors by Dominic Regan
- Spitfire, written and illustrated by Herb Trimpe
- Slap Happy Pappy, written and illustrated by Joe Keatinge
- Hack O'Hara (with a cameo by the Space Legion), written and illustrated by Erik Larsen
- Red Torpedo, written by B. Clay Moore and illustrated by Frank Fosco and Erik Larsen

=== Speed Comics #45 ===
Advertised in Fantastic Comics #24 but never released, this issue was to continue from Harvey Comics' Speed Comics, and would heave featured Shock Gibson, Captain Freedom and War Nurse on the cover.
