= Joe Keatinge =

American comic book writer and editor (born 1982)

- Born: June 11, 1982 (age 44) Santa Monica, California
- Area: Comics
- Notable works: Popgun (comics) Shutter (comics)
- Awards: 2008 Harvey Award for Best Anthology; 2010 Eisner Award for Best Anthology

Joe Keatinge is an American comic book writer and editor, best known for his writing work with Marvel Comics and Image Comics, as the co-editor of Popgun with Mark Andrew Smith, and co-creating the cult-favorite comic Shutter with Leila Del Duca.

== Early life ==
Joe Keatinge was born on June 11, 1982, in Santa Monica, California. He attended school in Portland, Oregon.

== Career ==
After finishing school, Keatinge left for San Francisco, California, to pursue a career in comics, eventually working with Savage Dragon creator Erik Larsen, leading to his hiring at Image Comics shortly after Larsen became Publisher.

Keatinge's career at Image spanned various positions including Public Relations and Marketing, as well as Sales and Licensing.

He has contributed to anthology titles such as Negative Burn with artist Evan Bryce and Fantastic Comics #24 with artists Michael Allred and Laura Allred, which was part of The Next Issue Project. In 2018, Keatinge collaborated with artist Bret Blevins on the Stellar limited series published by Image Comics.

He is most well known for his work on the anthology, PopGun with co-editor Mark Andrew Smith.

== Awards ==
- 2008 Harvey Award for Best Anthology (for PopGun Volume 1, with Mark Andrew Smith; Image Comics)
- 2010 Eisner Award for Best Anthology (for Popgun Volume 3, with Mark Andrew Smith and D. J. Kirkbride; Image Comics)

=== Nominations ===
- 2009 Harvey Award for Best Anthology for PopGun Volume 2

== Bibliography ==
=== As a writer ===
- Adventures of Superman #16: "Strange Visitor" (October, 2014)
- Ant #8: "Moving On: Part Four" (with Mario Gully, 2006)
- The CBLDF Presents Liberty Annual 2012: "Lumière" (with Chynna Clugston-Flores, 2012)
- Negative Burn #6: "Me, Myself, and Time" (with Evan Bryce, 2006)
- Next Issue Project:
  - Fantastic Comics #24: "Stardust the Super Wizard" (with Mike Allred, in #1, 2008)
  - Silver Streak Comics #24: "Kelly the Cop" (script, art and lettering, in #2, 2009)
  - Crack Comics #63: "Slap Happy Pappy" (script, art, lettering and coloring, in #3, 2011)
- PopGun Volume 1: "Afterword: Graphic Music" (with Val Nunez, 2007)
- Savage Dragon #171: "Twisted Savage Dragon Funnies: Finale" (with Erik Larsen, Simon Fraser, Tim Hamilton, George O'Connor, Mike Cavallaro and Joe Infurnari, 2011) collected in Twisted Savage Dragon Funnies (tpb, 128 pages, 2011, ISBN 1-60706-402-2)
- Glory #23-#34 (with Sophie Campbell, Extreme Studios, 2012-2013)
- Hell Yeah #1-ongoing (with Andre Szymanowicz, 2012-...)
- Shutter #1-30 (with Leila del Duca, Image Comics, 2014-2017)

=== As an editor ===
- Popgun (anthology, 2007–2010):
  - Volume One (with Mark Andrew Smith, 450 pages, 2007, ISBN 1-58240-824-6)
  - Volume Two (with Mark Andrew Smith, 472 pages, 2008, ISBN 1-58240-920-X)
  - Volume Three (Executive Editor, edited by Mark Andrew Smith and DJ Kirkbride, 472 pages, 2009, ISBN 1-58240-974-9)
  - Volume Four (Executive Editor, edited by DJ Kirkbride, Adam P. Knave and Anthony Wu, 512 pages, 2010, ISBN 1-60706-188-0)
- One Model Nation (with co-editor Mike Allred, written by C. Allbritton Taylor, illustrated by Jim Rugg, graphic novel, 144 pages, 2010, ISBN 1-60706-157-0)
- 50 Girls 50 #1-4 (written by Frank Cho and Doug Murray, illustrated by Axel Medellin Machain, 2011)

=== As a colorist ===
- Jack Staff #11 (with co-colorists Erik Larsen and Eric Stephenson and writer/artist/letterer Paul Grist, 2006)
- Masters of the Universe #4 ( with co-colorists Thomas Mason, James Offredi, Rex Stabbs, Ali "Haplo" Tavakoly, Deidre Lynn "Kookie" Vance and Larry Jámal Walton, 2004, reprinted in issue #17 of the UK series in 2005)
- Savage Dragon #115: "Freak Force: Together Again for the First Time!" (with co-colorist Dash Martin, writer Erik Larsen, artist Mark Englert, and letterer Chris Eliopoulos, 2004)
- Savage Dragon: God War #1-2 (with co-colorists Dash Martin and Josh Richardson, writer Robert Kirkman, artist Mark Englert, and letterer Rus Wooton, 2004-2005)

=== As an artist ===
- Bedtime Stories for Impressionable Children #1: "Life Stinks" (written by James Anthony Kuhoric, 2010)
