= Klaus Nordling =

American comics creator (1910-1986)

- Born: May 29, 1910 Pori, Finland
- Died: November 19, 1986 (aged 76) Ridgefield, Connecticut, U.S.
- Areas: Writer, Penciller
- Pseudonyms: F. Klaus, Ed Norris, Clyde North, Fred Nordley
- Notable works: Lady Luck; Thin Man

Klaus Nordling (May 29, 1910 – November 19, 1986) was an American writer-artist for American comic books. He is best known for his work on the 1940s masked-crimefighter feature "Lady Luck", and as co-creator of the Marvel Comics superhero the Thin Man. Some of the early Nordling's pen names are Fred Nordley, F. Klaus, Ed Norris, and Clyde North.

== Biography ==
=== Early life and career ===
Born in Pori, Finland, Klaus Nordling moved to the United States as a toddler in 1912. He broke into art professionally as a gag cartoonist for Americana Magazine in the 1930s. From 1935 to 1937, he wrote and drew the weekly newspaper comic strip Baron Munchausen for Van Tine Features, under the pen name Fred Nordley. In 1939, he joined the studio Eisner & Iger, a prominent comic book packager that produced comics on demand for publishers entering the new medium during the late-1930s and 1940s period fans and historians call the Golden Age of Comic Books.

Due to Golden Age comics work often going unsigned, comprehensive credits are difficult if not impossible to ascertain. Nordling's tentative credits begin with script and art for the naval adventure feature "Spark Stevens" in Fox Comics' Wonderworld Comics #3-4 (July-Aug. 1939). His first confirmed credit is as penciler-inker of the six-page feature "Lt. Drake of Naval Intelligence" in Fox's Mystery Men Comics #1 (Aug. 1939). Nordling, who is confirmably credited as the "Spark Stevens" writer-artist in Wonderworld Comics #5-#15 (Sept. 1939 - July 1940), also wrote and drew the humor features "Strut Warren" (in Fiction House's Fight Comics), "Bob Swab" (Quality Comics' Hit Comics), "Shorty Shortcake" in Wonderworld Comics, and "The Barker" (Quality's National Comics), plus the aviation feature "Shot and Shell" (Quality's Military Comics), among others. Some of his early comics are signed under the pen names F. Klaus, Ed Norris, and Clyde North.

Quality Comics editor Gill Fox recalled Nordling as "a little guy. Good-looking. And involved in local theatre. He had a very vivid imagination and was a good writer. In later years I'd send some work in his direction. But if you did something for him, he'd think you wanted something back. We got to know each other socially, but he still mistrusted people. Even me. But I admired his cartooning. And he was a great guy to sit and talk to".

Nordling created the feature "The Three Aces", also known as "Crash, Cork, and the Baron", in Harvey Comics' Speed Comics #1 (Oct. 1939), and the detective feature "Pen Miller" in National Comics #1 (July 1940). For Marvel Comics predecessor Timely Comics, Nordling and an unknown writer created the Thin Man, one of comics' first "stretching" superheroes, in Mystic Comics #4 (July 1940).

=== Lady Luck ===
Lady Luck. Art by Nordling.

In 1942, Nordling began his best-known comics work, "Lady Luck", which appeared as a four-page weekly feature in a Sunday newspaper insert colloquially called "The Spirit Section". This 16-page, tabloid-sized, newsprint comic book, sold as part of eventually 20 Sunday newspapers with a combined circulation as high as five million, starred Will Eisner's masked detective the Spirit. The titular crimefighting adventuress Lady Luck had been created and designed in 1940 by Eisner (who wrote her first two stories under the pseudonym "Ford Davis"), with artist Chuck Mazoujian. Writer Dick French then took over scripting. Writer-artist Nicholas Viscardi (later known as Nick Cardy) took over the feature beginning with the May 18, 1941 strip. Nordling succeeded him from the March 1, 1942 to March 3, 1946, strip, when "Lady Luck" was temporarily canceled. After briefly being replaced by the humor feature "Wendy the Waitress" by Robert Jenny, "Lady Luck" returned from May 5 to November 3, 1946, under cartoonist Fred Schwab.

As historians at the Chicago, Illinois, comics retailer Atlas Comics noted in "The Top 100 Artists of American Comic Books", which listed Nordling at #78,

Was there ever a better-dressed, better-looking heroine in comics than Lady Luck? Elegant and glamorous in the extreme, she was Nordling's crowning glory in scores of light, amusing adventure stories during the 1940s. His delicate, fine line style was a perfect compliment to the tone of the strip, both adventurous and whimsical.

"Lady Luck" stories were reprinted in the Quality Comics comic book Smash Comics #42-85 (April 1943 - Oct. 1949), whereupon the series changed its title to Lady Luck for five more issues. Nordling providing new seven- to 11-page stories in Lady Luck #86-90 (Dec. 1949 - Aug. 1950), with Gill Fox drawing the covers. Lady Luck #90 was Nordling's last known original comics work.

Nordling assisted Eisner on "The Spirit" pencil art from 1948 until 1951, sometimes doing full ghost-art penciling.

=== Later life and career ===
Following the end of "The Spirit Section" in 1952, Nordling worked for Eisner's American Visuals Corporation through the 1970s. There he helped design instructional publications and other materials for a variety of clients. For the U.S. Army, he contributed to the instructional "Joe Dope" feature in PS, The Preventive Maintenance Monthly, which American Visuals produced. Working with Eisner, he wrote and drew the comic Job Scene, designed to teach job-seeking skills to economically disadvantaged youth.

At some point, as well, Nordling penciled and inked a promotional comic book for Borden, Inc. He also was ghost artist on Guy Gilchrist's Register and Tribune Syndicate comic strip The Rock Channel.

Nordling died at his home in Ridgefield, Connecticut, survived by his wife, Tel, as well as by a son and a daughter.

== Reprint collections ==
- Ace Comics Presents #3: The Golden Age of Klaus Nordling (2000)

Includes "Bob and Swab" and "The Barker" stories, and January 21, 1982 Nordling letter to Jerry DeFuccio

- Lady Luck (Kitchen Sink Press, 1977–1978)
- Lady Luck (Ken Pierce, Inc. trade paperback, 1980)
