= Merlin the Magician (character) =

Merlin

Publication information
- Publisher: Quality Comics
- First appearance: National Comics #1 (July 1940)

In-story information
- Alter ego: Jock Kellog
- Team affiliations: All-Star Squadron
- Abilities: Magic manipulation via magic cloak

Merlin the Magician is a superhero in the publications of Quality Comics in the 1940s and, briefly in the 1990s, by DC Comics. Merlin first appeared in National Comics #1 (July 1940). The character is a direct descendant of the Arthurian wizard Merlin and spent most of his time fighting Nazis, using, as his title page frequently read, "occult powers to aid democracies in their fight against oppression".

== Fictional character biography ==
In 1940, while unhappily contemplating his waning fortunes, playboy Jock Kellog is contacted by a messenger who tells him his eccentric, wealthy uncle is ill and might be dying. Kellog races to the scene in rural England, hoping his financial troubles will be ameliorated by a great inheritance. Instead of the palatial residence he expected, Jock arrives at a modest cottage. Upon entering, he discovers it is filled with numerous antiques of Arthurian vintage. Kellog's uncle is indeed dying, and he tells the young playboy that he is the last of a line of men who can trace their descent directly from Merlin. Before dying, the old man gives Kellog a green, hooded cloak and tells him that, while wearing it, he will inherit all the powers of Merlin himself.

At first, Kellog disbelieves his uncle's story. However, while wearing the cloak, Kellog instinctively uses magic to save a woman falling from a building, and comes to accept his uncle's story as true. He thereafter resolves to use his newfound abilities to aid mankind. Kellog assumes the name of his magical ancestor, Merlin, and goes about roaming Europe, fighting Nazis wherever he encounters them.

In 1945, Merlin the Magician was one of several magic and occult heroes who were contacted by Hourman to help defeat an entity known as "Stalker". Although the heroes were victorious, Merlin was killed in the battle. The disposition of his cloak remains unknown, perhaps because there is no one left of Merlin's line to use it, making the cloak useless.

== Powers and abilities ==
Merlin possessed somewhat ill-defined but reputedly powerful magical abilities when wearing his magic cloak. He was shown able to produce virtually any effect that he could conceive. He could battle gods single-handedly, instantaneously teleport anywhere in the world, or summon mythological creatures to do his bidding. He also possessed astral projection, telekinesis, reality manipulation, and the ability to bring anyone back to life. Often, he could use his magic by speaking backwards.

== Similarity to other occult heroes ==
Like numerous other magical heroes of the era, Merlin the Magician shares some similarities with Lee Falk's popular Mandrake the Magician strip, particularly in his appearance, which was a stereotypical prewar "stage magician" look, with a suit, mustache and cape. Like Zatara, who was similarly descended from a famous predecessor (Leonardo da Vinci), Merlin the Magician frequently invoked his magical effects by speaking them backwards (this attribute was given to him in National Comics #12 by writer-artist Fred Guardineer, who had himself previously created the backwards-talking Zatara for Action Comics).

== Appearances ==
Merlin the Magician's final Quality Comics appearance was in National Comics #45. The last Merlin feature in National Comics appeared in issue #26. and thereafter followed an almost fifty-year hiatus for Merlin during which Quality Comics (or a large part of its stable of characters) was essentially folded into DC Comics. He made an appearance in All Star Comics v.2 #1 (May 1999), as a part of the 'Justice Society Returns' storyline. In that two-part arc, it was revealed that Merlin the Magician had actually died in battle with the supernatural entity known as "Stalker" in 1945.

In 1985, Blackthorne Publishing released some black and white reprints of early issues of National Comics, including Merlin the Magician's appearances.

=== Partial bibliography ===
- National Comics #1-45 (1940–1945)
- All-Star Squadron #31-32 (1984)
- All-Star Comics v. 2, #1 (1999)
