= Street Angel =

Street Angel(s) may refer to:

== Film ==
- Street Angel (1928 film), an American synchronized sound film
- Street Angel (1937 film), a Chinese film
- Street Angel (2009 film), an Australian short film based on the comic of the same name
- Street Angels (1991 film), an Australian television film
- Street Angels (1996 film), a Hong Kong film
- Street Angels (1999 film), a Singaporean film

== Music ==
- Street Angel (album), a 1994 album by Stevie Nicks
- "Street Angel", a 2016 song by Paul Simon from Stranger to Stranger

== Other uses ==
- Street Angel (comics), an alternative comic book series by Jim Rugg and Brian Maruca
