= Captain Triumph =

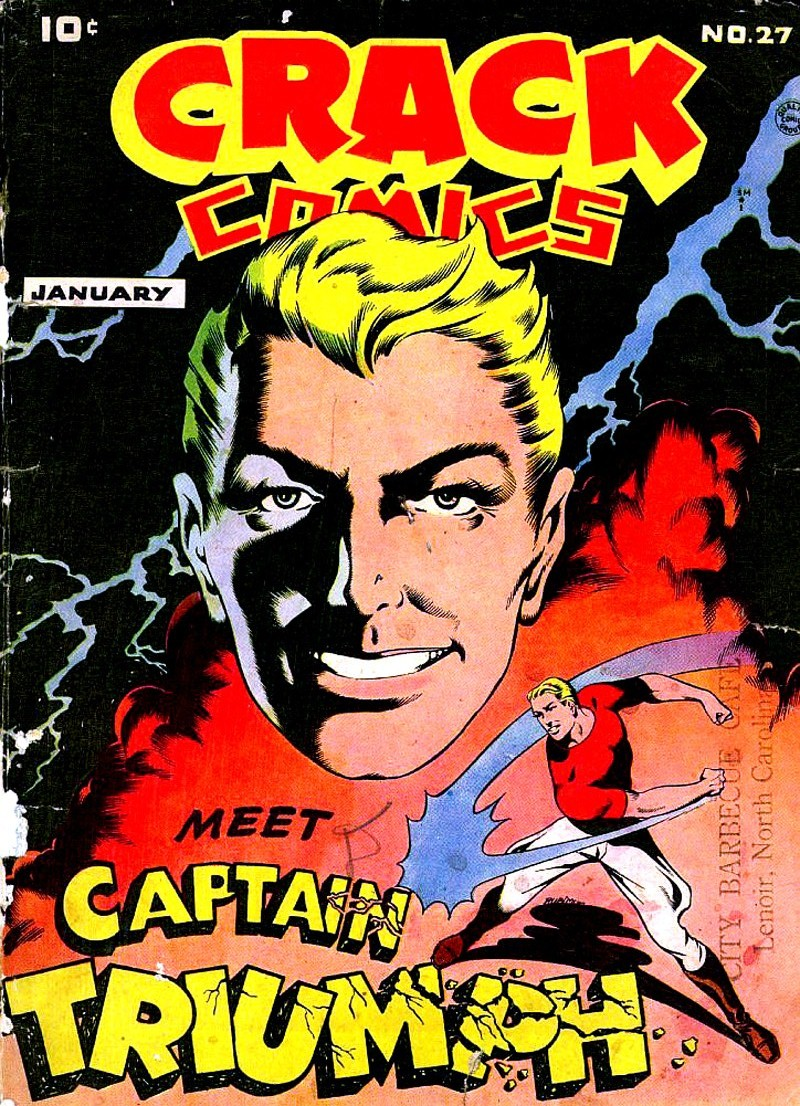
- Crack Comics #27, the first appearance of Captain Triumph. Art by Ruben Moreira.

Publication information
- Publisher: Quality Comics
- First appearance: Crack Comics #27 (January 1943)
- Created by: Alfred Andriola

In-story information
- Alter ego: Lance and Michael Gallant
- Abilities: Flight; Near invulnerability Invisibility; Limited superhuman strength Ability to alter his physical appearance, shape and size, and voice

Captain Triumph is a superhero from the Golden Age of Comics who first appeared in Crack Comics #27 (January 1943) which was published by Quality Comics. He continued to appear until the end of the series in Crack Comics #62 (September 1949).

The character was later obtained by DC Comics, though by that time he had already lapsed into the public domain. Some of his Golden Age adventures were reprinted by AC Comics in the Men of Mystery anthology. He is not to be confused with another DC Comics property named Triumph.

An original version of the character appears in the DC Universe series Peacemaker.

== Creative teams ==
Alfred Andriola was initially the artist on Captain Triumph, with the writer remaining unknown. Andriola only remained with Captain Triumph for six months, leaving to work on Kerry Drake. The artists in the middle issues of Captain Triumph's Crack Comics run are mostly a matter of conjecture, as Golden Age artists frequently did not sign their work. Beginning in Crack Comics #46 and ending with the book's cancellation, Captain Triumph's stories were penciled and inked by Reed Crandall.

== Costume ==
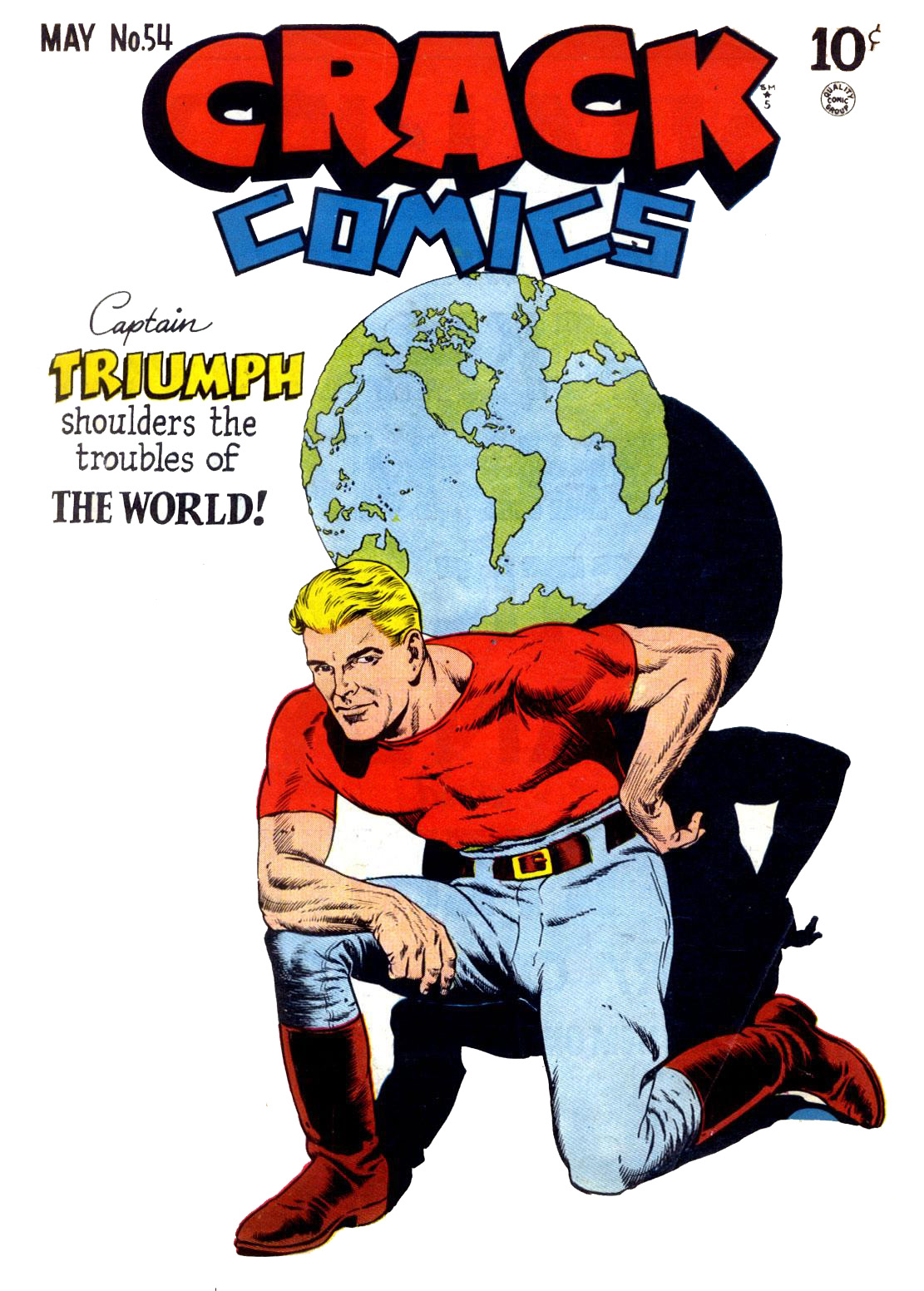
The cover to Crack Comics #54, one of only four times the character was shown with light blue jodhpurs; art by Reed Crandall.

Captain Triumph has a minimal costume consisting of a plain, red, short-sleeved, crew neck T-shirt, ordinary white jodhpurs, a brown belt, brown riding boots, and no mask. Comic book historian Don Markstein commented: "By the time Cap appeared in 1943, the tide of superhero comic book characters was receding somewhat. Captain Triumph's costume was just enough to get across the idea he was a superhero, but since the genre was fading did not emphasize the fact".

== Publication history ==
=== Crack Comics ===
Crack Comics started out as a monthly title, like most 1940s anthology comic books, but dropped down to bi-monthly shortly after World War II began due to wartime paper shortages. It switched to quarterly about a year after Captain Triumph joined the lineup. When the war was over, most surviving anthologies ramped back up to monthly, but Crack Comics only ever got back to bi-monthly (coming out in odd-numbered months). It did outlast most of the others, ending with its 62nd issue, dated September 1949.

Captain Triumph's only appearances during the Golden Age were within 36 issues of Crack Comics, from his introduction in #27 until the book's cancellation with #62. He was the lead feature within, and appeared on the cover of, every one of those issues.

=== The end of Quality Comics ===
By the mid-1950s, with television and paperback books drawing readers away from comic books in general and superheroes in particular, interest in Quality's characters had declined considerably. After a foray into other genres such as war, humor, romance and horror, the company ceased operations with comics cover dated December 1956. Many of its properties were sold to National Periodical Publications (now DC Comics) which chose to keep only a few titles running, such as Blackhawk and G.I. Combat. Though it owned the rights to Captain Triumph, DC would not use the character for several more decades.

=== The All-Star Squadron ===
Captain Triumph appears on the cover of the first issue of All-Star Squadron as one of a group of photos spread over a table, along with the tag line "Who Will Be the Heroes of the....All-Star Squadron" although he does not actually appear within the issue - or anywhere else in the series, for that matter. Writer Roy Thomas stated that he always intended to use Captain Triumph in All-Star Squadron, but never got around to it before the title was cancelled.

=== The Titans ===
Captain Triumph retires from action at an unknown time. Lance later appears in The Titans as a friend of Libby Lawrence. Michael is still present as a spirit, but has apparently gone psychotic in the many years of inactivity. The twins discover Libby's young fiancé's love affair. Lance tries to confront the fiancé on the matter but is taken over by Michael's ghost who quickly murders the man for infidelity to his friend.

Jim Shelley on Flashback Universe refers to this tale of an insane, murdering version of Captain Triumph as "his last appearance…probably best forgotten".

=== Female version ===
A female version of Captain Triumph debuts in Uncle Sam and the Freedom Fighters. This version only demonstrates super-strength and the ability to fly.

=== Next Issue Project ===
In November 2011, Captain Triumph appears, as part of Image Comics' Next Issue Project, in Crack Comics #63, written and penciled by Alan Weiss.

== Fictional character biography ==
=== Lance Gallant and Michael Gallant ===
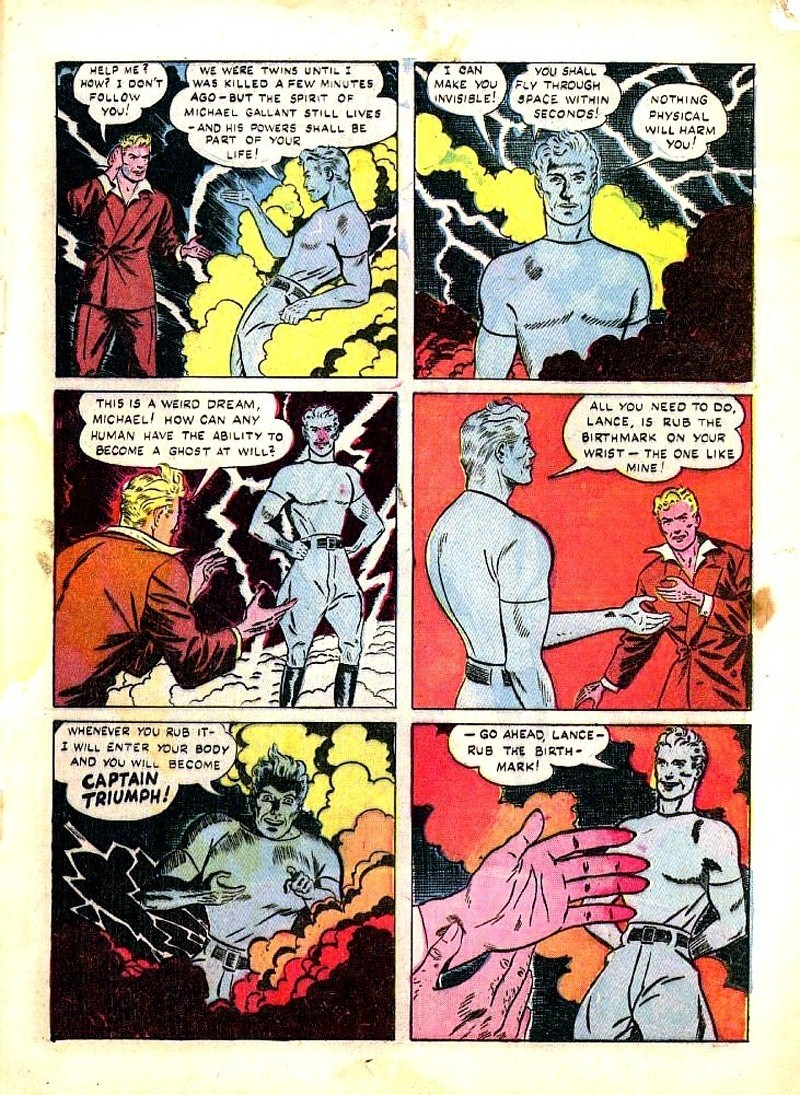
Lance Gallant meets his dead brother Michael Gallant. Crack Comics #27, art by Alfred Andriola.

==== Quality Comics history ====
In 1919, twin brothers Lance Gallant and Michael Gallant are born in New York City. They are so alike, even down to a T-shaped birthmark on their left wrists, that their own mother cannot tell them apart. The two remain close, even for twins, as they grow up.

When America is drawn into the Second World War, Michael enlists in the U.S. Army Air Corps as a pilot while Lance "crusaded with his own weapons – the word and pen" as a journalist. However, on Michael's 23rd birthday as he brings his plane in to land, the hangar he is entering explodes. His fiancée Kim Meredith and brother Lance witness this act of sabotage, and the latter races into the burning structure, managing to find his badly-injured sibling, only for Michael to die in his arms.

Lance swears vengeance on the murderers and those like them. Unknown to him, creatures of myth called the Fates are watching all this. Impressed, the Fates decide to create a champion. Soon afterwards, Lance receives a shocking visitation from Michael's ghost who reveals that they remain linked together. If Lance touches his birthmark, they will merge gaining superpowers as a result. Touching the mark a second time will separate them again. Calling himself Captain Triumph, Lance is a crimefighter.

==== DC Comics history ====
In DC Comics, Captain Triumph is revealed to have been a member of the All Star Squadron alongside Liberty Belle.

Michael's ghost later gained control of Lance's body when Lance started to get emotional. Lance learns that Phillip Geyer is seeing Jesse Quick, so Michael takes control of Lance's body and kills Phillip. The Titans and the aged heroine Libby Lawrence later investigate the murder as Lance states that he knows who did it. Michael attacks Jesse Quick, only to be defeated by Nightwing. Lance told the Titans and Libby that Michael had killed Phillip and surrenders to the police.

When Harley Quinn breaks DC continuity, Captain Triumph falls from the sky and is separated from his brother's ghost. When he confronts Mayor LaGuardia, Harley helps him get away from Checkmate agents. After learning that Harley was responsible for him being transported to the 21st century, Captain Triumph grabs her by the neck. This leads to a fight in a construction site, where Captain Triumph decides not to kill Harley and storms off. Captain Triumph is found at his favorite hot dog stand, so Harley takes him to the airfield where Michael died. He sees Michael's ghost as they disappear into the timestream.

=== Second version ===
An unnamed female operated as Captain Triumph and was a member of the Crusaders.

== Powers and abilities ==
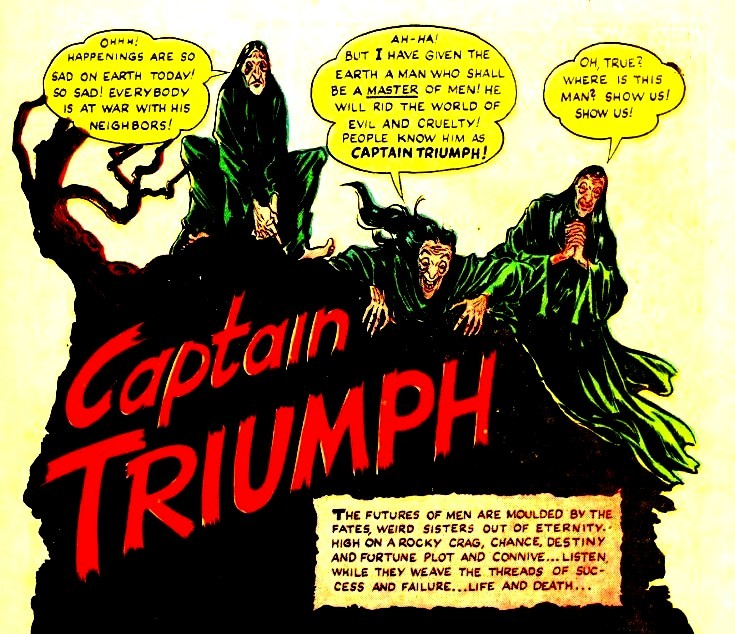
The Fates discuss the state of the world, and their newly created champion, Captain Triumph. Crack Comics #28, art by Alfred Andriola.

Lance Gallant merges with the ghost of his brother, and the two form Captain Triumph.

Within the context of this series, the Fates are presented as three hag-like crones, sisters named Chance, Destiny and Fortune. They give Captain Triumph three "ghostly" powers: flight, invisibility and near-invulnerability. Michael Gallant says his spirit first appears to his brother: "I can make you invisible! You shall fly through space within seconds! Nothing physical will harm you!"

When the brothers are separated into two individuals, Michael's ghost can move through walls, spy invisibly, and then report back to Lance. On the initial occasion when Michael reveals his existence to Kim, she is able to see and hear him. Thereafter, though Lance can always definitely see and hear Michael, whether Kim or Biff can do so is inconsistently presented throughout the series - and sometimes within the same story.

With intense concentration, Michael is able to communicate with, and influence the actions of, other people and creatures. When the Jacksons are threatened, Michael is able to influence April, the daughter of the family, to write to Lance Gallant for help. In "The Castle of Shadows!", he controls a rat to gnaw through ropes binding Kim and compels a criminal to not search the hiding place of an important document.

Captain Triumph has the ability to alter his physical appearance, shape and size, and at the same time change his voice, a power that comes in very handy when his adventures require impersonation.

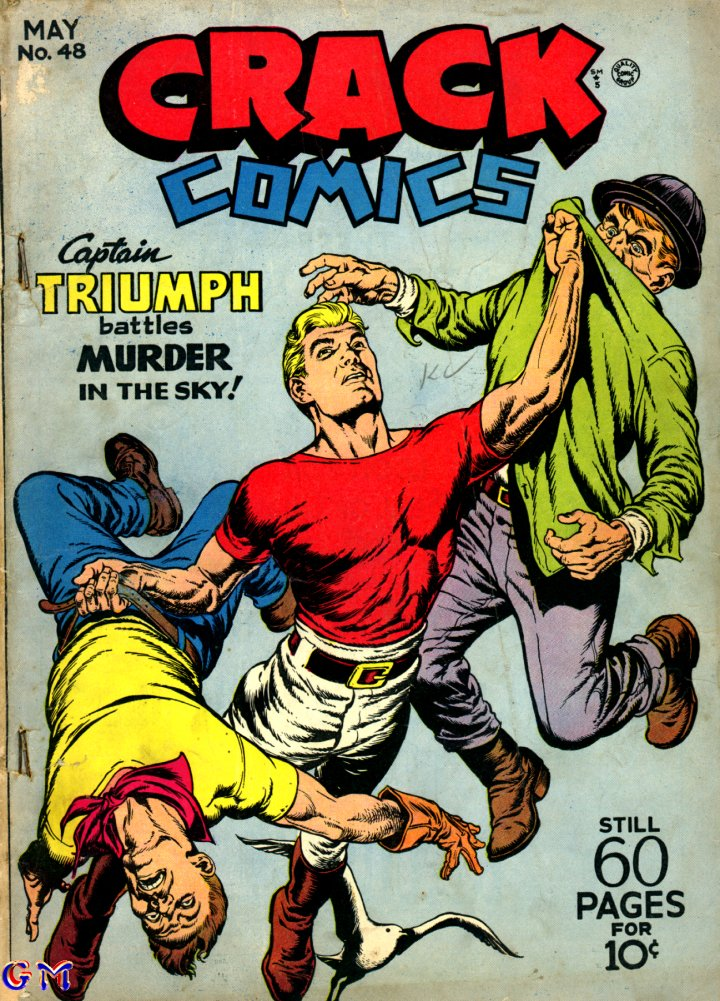
One of the powers given to Captain Triumph by the Fates is the ability to fly. Crack Comics #47, art by Reed Crandall.

Captain Triumph also has limited super-strength. He can stop a racing car by either grabbing its bumper or standing in front of it and punching it, bend rifle barrels, break chains, and snap rifle bayonets with his bare hands. He can also punch through a brick wall, steel bank vault doors, and jail bars, and routinely holds his own in physical confrontations against multiple, normal human attackers much larger than he is. However, his opponents are never seriously injured, and sometimes not even disabled, by his full-power blows.

Captain Triumph is almost but not completely invulnerable. On numerous occasions he is shot repeatedly, and the bullets have no effect. Attempts to kill him with sharp weapons, such as knives and axes, see them bend or break on his body. He survives a point-blank bazooka blast with no damage. Being shot with an atomic beam that can cut through anything only causes him to laugh and say, "I’m ticklish!" When faced with a powerful "explosive pill" about to go off and wreck a defense factory, his solution to the problem is to simply swallow the pill.

The second Captain Triumph has super-strength.

== Personality ==
Before Michael's death, and his merging with Lance to become Captain Triumph, the two are extraordinarily close, and alike, even for twins: "As they grew, the bonds of love and companionship that existed between them became stronger than any bond of steel or cable of strength that man could manufacture. So close were they, that in their work, their play, and the exciting adventures that filled their lives, their bodies responded but to one mind".

Both twins are intelligent, daring, and athletic. Though they are presented as being very similar, throughout the series it becomes obvious that Lance is the more thoughtful, and intellectually inclined of the two, while Michael is more the daredevil, witness their differing vocations of journalist and military pilot, respectively.

When the twins merge into Captain Triumph, they form a composite personality, with neither obviously dominant, and when they split apart again they are both aware of everything that has occurred to the composite as Captain Triumph.

== Supporting cast ==
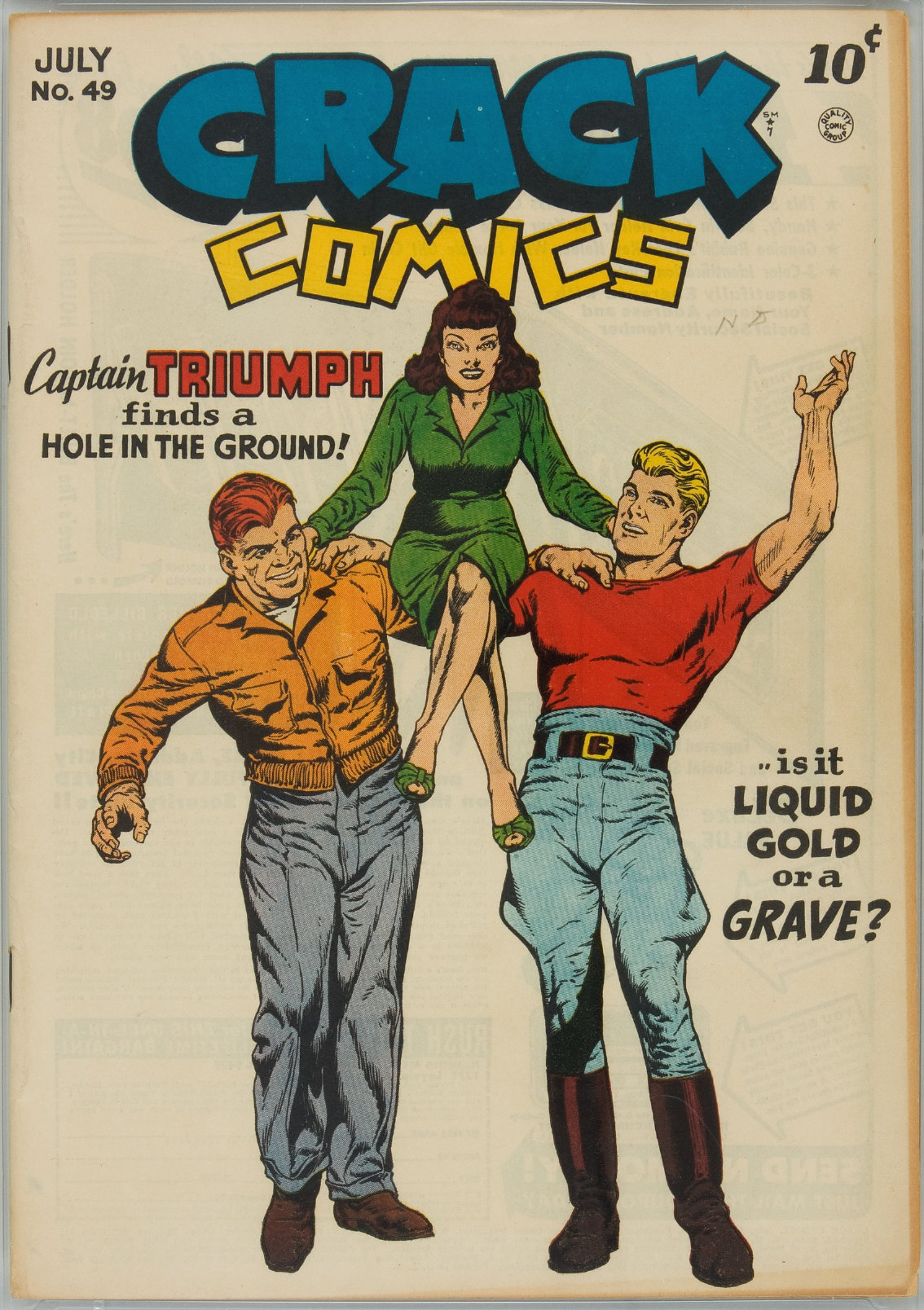
Captain Triumph with his partners in adventure, Kim Meredith and Biff (and another appearance of the light blue jodhpurs). Crack Comics #49, art by Reed Crandall.

- Kim Meredith is introduced in Captain Triumph's first appearance as Michael Gallant's fiancée. In his second appearance, both Michael's ghost and Lance jointly tell her the secret of Captain Triumph. An extremely strong-willed young woman, thereafter she is Cap's devoted and trustworthy helper and confidante. In one adventure, after being kidnapped, she refuses to give her captor any information on Captain Triumph even though she is beaten "…until [her] face is covered with blood and welts and open wounds". Eventually she becomes Lance's fiancée, as well.
- In his fourth appearance, Captain Triumph encounters a down-on-his-luck professional clown named Biff who is on the verge of being fired from his job. Sympathizing, Cap uses his powers of flight and invisibility to ensure that Biff's next show is spectacular. Even though in the aftermath his job as a clown is at least temporarily assured, after being drawn into one of Cap's adventures, and thoroughly enjoying it, Biff readily accepts Lance Gallant's offer to become his personal assistant. Though Lance is presented as being born into "a middle-class family" and at the time supposedly has as income only his journalist's pay, he has no problem affording a personal, live-in assistant. Thereafter the burly former clown serves as Lance, Michael and Captain Triumph's steadfast friend and backup muscle. Eventually Lance, Kim and Biff wind up co-owners in a successful gold mine, and Biff buys shares in a "record-breaking" oil well, but though this makes them all independently wealthy they continue to stay, and adventure, together.

== Enemies ==
According to Jess Nevins' Encyclopedia of Golden Age Superheroes, Captain Triumph's enemies include:

- Sydney Greenstreet-like Spade the Ruthless.
- The mad scientist Dr. Vossburg ("the Man Who Conquered Flame").
- The Nazi spy the Raven (and his stolen sonic death grenades).
- The unspeaking criminal mastermind known only as "Silent".

== Other versions ==
An alternate universe version of Captain Triumph appears in The Golden Age. This version retired to pursue a normal life, despite his brother's ghost urging him to be a hero again. He later meets the reformed supervillain Tigress who he falls in love with. He refuses to listen to his brother and dies defending Tigress from Robotman.

== In other media ==
An alternate universe version of Captain Triumph, Keith Smith, appears in the second season of Peacemaker, portrayed by David Denman. This version is an alternate universe counterpart of Peacemaker's brother, and a member of the Top Trio.
