= National Comics =

National Comics may refer to:

- National Comics (series), a 1940s comic book series published by Quality Comics
- National Comics Publications, the predecessor of DC Comics
