= Black Condor =

Fictional characters in the DC Comics universe

Publication information
- Publisher: DC Comics
- First appearance: (Grey); Crack Comics #1 (May 1940) (Kendall); Black Condor #1 (June 1992) (Trujillo); Uncle Sam and the Freedom Fighters #3 (Nov. 2006)
- Created by: (Grey); Will Eisner (writer); Lou Fine (artist) (Kendall); Brian Augustyn (writer); Rags Morales (artist) (Trujillo); Jimmy Palmiotti (writer); Justin Gray (writer); Daniel Acuña (artist)

In-story information
- Alter ego: Richard Grey Jr.; Ryan Kendall; John Trujillo
- Species: Metahuman
- Team affiliations: (All); Freedom Fighters (Grey); All-Star Squadron; Justice League (Kendall); Primal Force; Justice League International; Black Lantern Corps; Justice League
- Notable aliases: (Grey); Thomas "Tom" Wright
- Abilities: See below

Black Condor is the superhero name used by three different fictional characters in the DC Comics universe. All three incarnations of Black Condor have been members of the Freedom Fighters and each has been featured in Freedom Fighters comic books published by DC Comics.

The first Black Condor, Richard Grey Jr., was created by Quality Comics writer Will Eisner and artist Lou Fine. He first appeared in Crack Comics #1 (May 1940), and continued through issue #31 (Oct 1943). He also appeared in Uncle Sam Quarterly #2 (Dec 1941). He moved to the DC universe when DC Comics bought the rights to Quality Comics characters. The first Black Condor was a World War II era super hero along with the rest of the Freedom Fighters.

The second Black Condor, Ryan Kendall, gained the power of flight due to genetic manipulation and initially did not believe he was a superhero. He would later join the Freedom Fighters, but was killed at the beginning of the Infinite Crisis storyline.

The third Black Condor, John Trujillo, is of Mayan descent and was given his powers by the Mayan Spider Goddess Tocotl. Seeing himself as a protector of the universe, he joins forces with the Freedom Fighters.

== Fictional character biography ==
=== Richard Grey Jr. ===
==== Quality Comics ====
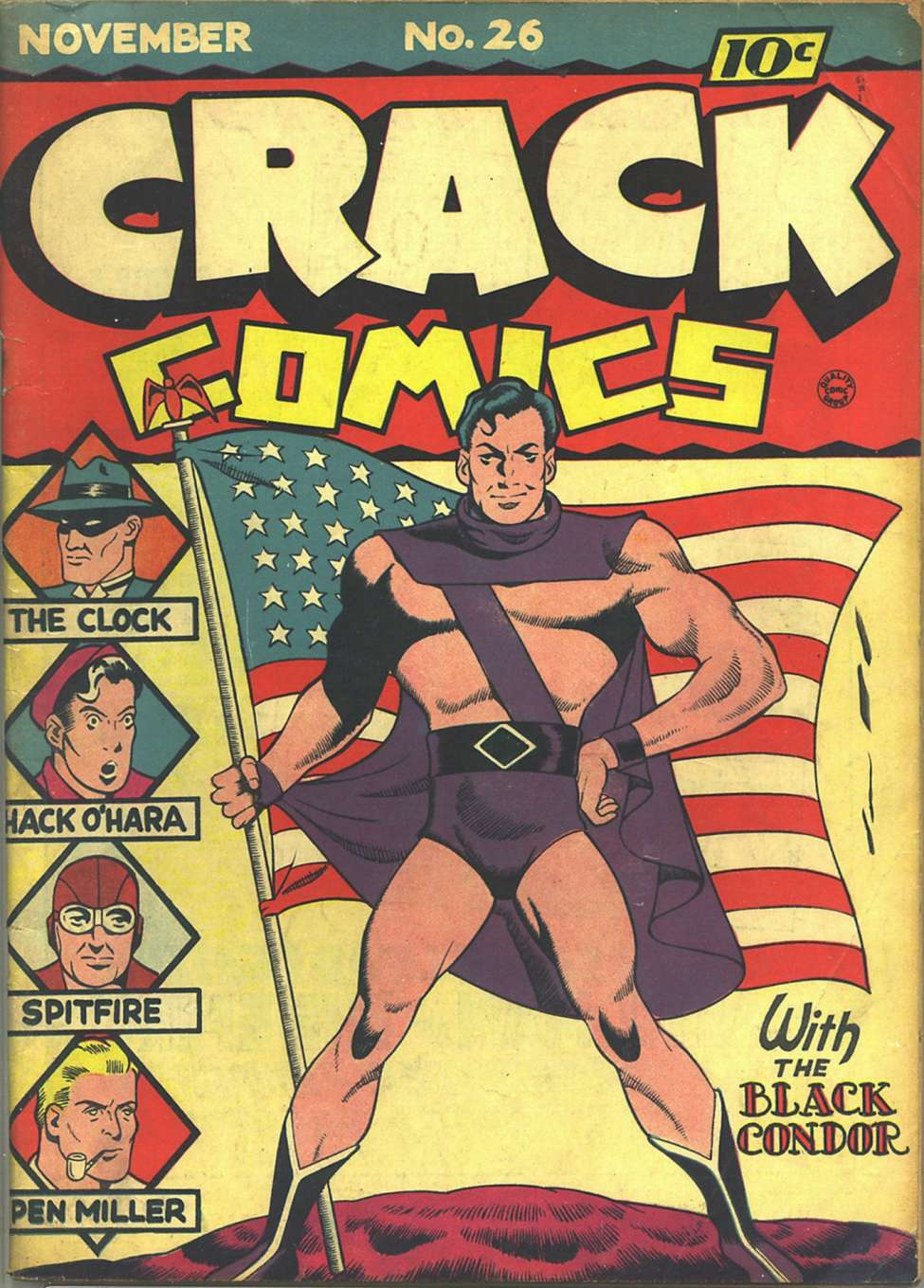
Crack Comics #26, art by Gill Fox.

A Golden Age superhero who possesses the power of flight, the Black Condor was created by writer Will Eisner under the pseudonym Kenneth Lewis, and artist Lou Fine in Crack Comics #1 (cover-dated May 1940). Initially alternating with the Clock as the cover-featured character, he became the solo cover feature from issues #20-26 (Jan.-Nov. 1942). Fine drew the first 24 stories, and his feature continued to run through issue #31.

As an infant traveling with his parents on an archaeological expedition thorough Outer Mongolia, Richard Grey Jr. survives after his family is killed by the bandit Gali Kan and his men. Rescued by a condor who raises him as her own, he learns to fly, as the origin story states, by "studying the movement of wings, the body motions, air currents, balance and levitation" of his avian siblings. A mountain hermit, Father Pierre, eventually discovers and civilizes the feral child, and teaches him to speak English. Richard tracks down and kills the Mongolian bandits who killed his parents and then departs for the United States where he uncovers a plot to kill United States Senator Thomas Wright. He is too late to save Wright from assassination, and so begins to use his identity. He adopts the guise of Black Condor to fight crooked politicians, rum-running bootleggers, and racketeers.

The strip was popular, and became Crack Comics' featured story starting in issue #3. In American Comic Book Chronicles: 1940-1944, Kurt Mitchell writes: "The Asian backdrop was deemphasized by the end of the year in favor of urban settings or ornately rendered lost cities, bandits and jewel thieves giving ground to mad scientists, living statues, and sentient weapons of mass destruction. Scene after scene of the Condor in flight, his lithe figure soaring across backgrounds seen from dizzying perspectives with a grace Joe Shuster's barrel-chested Superman could not hope to match, made the series irresistible".

According to Jess Nevins' Encyclopedia of Golden Age Superheroes, "Black Condor fights femmes fatale, the Eagle Battalion, Yellow Perils, Kite-Men (Japanese agents on flying kites), a Chinese mad scientist, a golem, and killer robots known as the Spinning Deaths".

==== DC Comics ====
In the DC Universe, his power was retconned to being caused by exposure to a radioactive meteor. Here he meets Uncle Sam and joins the latter's group, the Freedom Fighters, and later the All-Star Squadron.

He is among a group of Golden and Silver Age heroes who help the JLA repel an Appellaxian invasion in the JLA: Year One miniseries by Mark Waid. He appeared more recently as an ethereal "spirit guide" in Ryan Kendall's Black Condor series.

=== Ryan Kendall ===
Black Condor #1, cover by Rags Morales.

The second Black Condor, Ryan Kendall, derives his powers of flight, telekinesis, and healing from the genetic experiments of his grandfather, Creighton. A member of an organization called the Society of the Golden Wing, Creighton and his allies were attempting to create a man who could fly. After numerous attempts, Kendall is the only success. Kendall eventually rebels and escapes from Creighton., who makes frequent attempts to recapture the youth in order to study and reproduce his abilities.

A mysterious telekinetic who keeps to himself, Ryan Kendall is adamant when he first appears as the Black Condor that he is not a superhero. However, time proves him wrong, and he fights alongside other superheroes, notably Primal Force and Justice League International (for a brief time). Eventually, he goes to Opal City, where he feels at home.

In his solo adventures, Kendall seeks out Hawkman in hopes of gaining insight into the role of a superhero. He helps in his battle against Lion-Mane.

In Infinite Crisis #1, Kendall, as part of the Freedom Fighters, was killed by Sinestro during an ambush by the Secret Society of Super Villains.

=== John Trujillo ===
John Trujillo, the third Black Condor, art by Daniel Acuña.

Uncle Sam and the Freedom Fighters #3 introduced a third Black Condor named John Trujillo whose home turf is the Arizona desert. John was given the hereditary powers of the Black Condor by Tocotl, a Mayan spider goddess.

Trujillo sees himself as a protector of the universe. He first appears when he single-handedly rescues Uncle Sam and the other Freedom Fighters, who had been defeated by agents of S.H.A.D.E. Trujillo is very serious and seems somewhat uncomfortable interacting with other people.

In issue #6, he rebuffs romantic overtures by the Phantom Lady, correctly (as she realizes later) assuming that she does not really mean it.

The full extent of Trujillo's powers remains unrevealed. He can fly at extremely high speeds, control the wind, and may possess moderate superhuman strength and speed.

== Powers and abilities ==
The first Black Condor has the mutant ability to fly, although no limits are known as to speed, duration or altitude. Sometime after arriving on Earth-X, it became apparent that his mutant powers also included limited telekinesis abilities, most notably mind-over-matter. At times, the Black Condor carries a ray gun, the origin of which is unknown. When used, it fires a black force beam of adjustable power capable of stunning a man or breaking a brick wall. He is a skilled hand-to-hand combatant and an Olympic level athlete.

The second Black Condor possesses telekinesis which he also used to fly, as well as limited empathic abilities and a rapid healing rate.

The third Black Condor has so far only demonstrated the abilities of flight and wind/air-current control, but has been credited by Tocotl as an elemental of the sky and Earth. He also has a moderate level of superhuman strength and speed, and seems quite ruthless.

== Other versions ==
- An alternate universe version of Black Condor appears in Superman #349. This version is a gender-flipped version of Black Canary.
- An alternate universe version of Black Condor appears in 52. This version is from Earth-10, a universe similar to Earth-X.
- New Super-Man features a character named the Blue Condor (an analog of the Black Condor).
- Multiversity: The Mastermen features an African-American Black Condor as one of Uncle Sam's Freedom Fighters.

== In other media ==
=== Television ===
The Richard Grey Jr. incarnation of Black Condor appears in the Batman: The Brave and the Bold episode "Cry Freedom Fighters!", voiced by Jason Charles Miller.

=== Film ===
The John Trujillo incarnation of Black Condor appears in Justice League: Crisis on Infinite Earths.

=== Miscellaneous ===
- The Richard Grey Jr. incarnation of Black Condor appears in Justice League Unlimited #17.
- The John Trujillo incarnation of Black Condor appears in Freedom Fighters: The Ray, voiced by Jason Mitchell. This version is an openly gay member of the Freedom Fighters from Earth-X. Additionally, a non-metahuman Earth-1 incarnation makes minor appearances throughout the series.
