= Lorraine Fox =

American illustrator

- Born: May 22, 1922; Brooklyn, New York, United States
- Died: 1976 (aged 53–54)
- Education: Pratt Institute (1944); Brooklyn Museum Art School (1960s)
- Known for: Illustrator
- Spouse: Bernard D'Andrea
- Elected: Hall of Fame, Society of Illustrators; 1979

Lorraine Fox, illustration for "That Certain Kind of Miracle" article, March 1961, Woman's Day

Lorraine Fox (1922–1976) was an American illustrator and commercial artist who illustrated magazines, book covers, and advertisements. Among the magazines she illustrated for were Woman's Day, Good Housekeeping, Redbook, McCall's, and Cosmopolitan. She was inducted into the Society of Illustrators' Hall of Fame in 1979.

== Early life ==
Fox was born in Brooklyn on May 22, 1922. She was the daughter of Theodore, an accountant, and Florence Gatto Fox. (Note: Her grandparents were immigrants from Ireland and Germany. Her father, Theodore Fox, was the son of William Rohadinsky, who immigrated to the United States from Germany in 1887. The family—including William, Sr.; William, Jr.; Theodore; and Augusta—changed their surname from Rohadinsky to Fox in 1900.) Lorraine Fox's brother was the cartoonist and comic book artist Gill Fox, who gave Lorraine confidence to explore her artistic talents and was inspired by Lorraine to create illustrations. Her mother cleaned houses to pay for her daughter's tuition to Pratt Institute.

== Education ==
Lorraine Fox graduated from Pratt Institute in 1944. She met fellow illustrator Bernard D'Andrea at Pratt and they inspired each other's talent. Beginning in 1961, she studied painting for four years at Brooklyn Museum Art School with Reuben Tam and her work took on a more mature and deeper emotional quality.

== Career ==
While working for Keiswetter Agency, Fox also produced freelance work for Seventeen and Better Homes and Gardens. Her works, including full illustrations and a regular column of drawings, appeared in Woman's Day.

In 1951, she married D'Andrea in New York. That year, she also joined the Charles E. Cooper studio with a collection of illustrators, including D'Andrea, Coby Whitmore, and Jon Whitcomb. According to The New School, it was "one of the most influential studios for photography and commercial art" at the time. Fox, one of the most notable female illustrators of the mid-20th century, illustrated books, book covers, advertisements, and she continued to illustrate for magazines, such as Good Housekeeping, Redbook, McCall's, and Cosmopolitan. Women illustrators were often hired to create illustrations of children, who were portrayed as innocent and wholesome, or as naughty, like Fox's dark, young Sherlock made in the 1960s. As magazines relied increasingly on photography to fill their pages, it became difficult to remain competitive as an illustrator into the 1960s, but Fox was one of the artists, like Bernard Fuchs and Austin Briggs, to create their own new and unique style.

Fox taught for a home-school art program at the Famous Artists School, along with other successful artists like Norman Rockwell, Al Capp and Bernard Fuchs. Students submitted their works to professional illustrators, cartoonists, and painters, who critiqued them and returned comments and drawings to the students. From 1965 to 1976, Fox taught at Parsons School of Design. She often exhibited her works—made with oils, watercolors, or other media—with her husband at galleries and museums.

Murray Tinkelman, who was also an instructor at Parsons, said in a 1977 American Artist article that Fox was able to have a successful career as an illustrator when photography was a major form for illustration. Like Fox, Tinkelman studied under Reuban Tam and worked at Charles E. Cooper studio. He admired her use of abstract shapes, color, and symbolism and was determined as an illustrator to be "the second best Lorraine Fox". Fox was described as "an elegant, quiet woman, highly imaginative, gifted in design and a standout artist in a field overbearingly populated by men" by journalist Don Stewart.

Fox died in 1976 of lung cancer. (Note: According to the primary source, the Social Security Death Index, Lorraine Dandrea, born May 22, 1922 in Brooklyn, New York, died in March 1976. Her permanent residence at the time was Great Neck, Nassau, New York.) In 1979, three years after her death, she became the first female inductee of the Society of Illustrators' Hall of Fame. The New School and Smithsonian American Art Museum / National Portrait Gallery Library maintain an artist file of documents related to her career. Her work was included in the "Here's Looking at You, Kid" exhibition from January 31 to March 31, 2012, at the Society of Illustrators' Museum.

== Published works ==
- Lorraine Fox (illustrator) (1953). Better Homes and Gardens Baby Book: A Handbook for Parents. New York: Meredith Publishing Company.
- Jennie Grossinger, Lorraine Fox (illustrator) (1958). The Art of Jewish Cooking. New York: Random House. ASIN B00IV9HO9W.
- Lorraine Fox (1960). The Nursery Book: Pictures. New York: McLoughlin Brothers. OCLC 15164112.
- Lorraine Fox (illustrator); Shirley Jackson (1963). 9 Magic Wishes. New York: Crowell-Collier. OCLC 773899613.
- Lorraine Fox (illustrator); Mark VanDoren (1966). Somebody Came. New York: Quist. OCLC 773898694.
