= Arthur Pinajian =

Armenian-American comics artist

- Born: Arthur Ashod Pinajian; March 28, 1914
- Died: August 19, 1999 (aged 85) Bellport, New York
- Areas: Writer, Artist
- Pseudonyms: Art Gordon; Art Franklin; Jay Fletcher; Tohm Dixon; Tomm Dixon
- Notable works: Madame Fatal; Invisible Hood

Arthur A. (Art) Pinajian (March 28, 1914 – August 19, 1999) was an Armenian American comic book writer. He was active as a comic book creator from the late 1930s throughout the 1950s, during the Golden Age of Comic Books, and as an artist from the 1950s until his death in 1999. He was a member of the Eisner-Iger Studio in 1938-39 and of Funnies, Inc. in 1939-42. Pinajian created the Quality Comics characters Madame Fatal and the Invisible Hood, also known as Hooded Justice and Invisible Justice.

== Early life ==
Born in 1914, Pinajian grew up in an Armenian community in West Hoboken, New Jersey (now Union City, New Jersey), and was a self-trained cartoonist. His parents survived the 1915 Armenian genocide and subsequently made their way to the United States. Pinajian's poetic color combinations are linked to the tonalities of his fellow Armenian, Arshile Gorky.

== Career and legacy ==
Pinajian worked on many 1930s Centaur Publications titles and features, including 'Captain Juan', 'Egbert the Great', and 'Tim Roberts'. He subsequently joined Funnies Inc. Pinajian also drew 'Captain Terry Thunder' for Fiction House, 'Inspector Bancroft' for Fox Comics, 'The Wasp' for Lev Gleason Publications, and 'Jungle Terror' for Timely Comics. He was a regular at Quality Comics with 'Hooded Justice', 'Invisible Justice', 'Madam Fatal' and 'Reynolds of the Mounted'. In the 1950s he worked on Western stories for Atlas/Marvel.

He served in the U.S. Army in World War II and received the Bronze Star Medal for valor.

Pinajian also painted portraits, landscapes and some abstract works. He has been cited for his work in the field of abstract expressionism. Pinajian had instructed that the works be thrown away when he died. His wishes were ignored, and $30 million worth of his art was found in the garage of the Bellport, Long Island home where Pinajian lived from 1973 until his death in 1999. Two investors purchased the home in 2007 with the intent of renovating it, not knowing the art that was stored there. A collection of Arthur Pinajian's work, discovered in 2007, generated interest in the art community. A day school showed the paintings in March 2013.

At the first gallery exhibit, one painting sold for $100,000, so far the highest price paid for one of Pinajian's paintings although works are usually listed for around $5,000. Thomas Schultz, who helped save the collection, is the full-time registrar. American art historian Peter Hastings Falk is the exhibitions director and chief curator and values the collection at around 30 million dollars. In 2019, an updated estimate put the value of the collection at $90 million.

A 2015 book by Pinajian's cousin Pete Najarian, "The Paintings of Art Pinajian, A Family Story," alleges that Pinajian had verbally left his paintings to Najarian, but left no written will. The book seeks to prove that Pinajian never wanted his work “thrown into the garbage,” as was stated by Falk in his book, Pinajian, Master of Abstraction Discovered, which states, "Pinajian left instructions for his collection to be discarded in the town dump."

== Death ==
Pinajian died in 1999. He is buried in Calverton National Cemetery, Calverton, Suffolk County, New York.
