= George Brenner =

American cartoonist

George E. Brenner (1913–1952) was an American cartoonist in the mid 20th-century. He created comics such as The Clock, Bozo the Iron Man, and 711.

Brenner was first employed by the Comics Magazine Company before moving to Everett "Busy" Arnold's Quality Comics group in late 1937, attaining the title of Executive Editor. He subsequently worked on titles such as Crack Comics, Doll Man Quarterly, Feature Comics, Police Comics, and Smash Comics. The cover for Smash Comics #22 was drafted by Brenner. One of the pseudonyms he used was "Wayne Reid".

He also had a small part as a guest in the 1946 movie The Razor's Edge.

The circumstances of his death are unknown, but Brenner is remembered as creator of the first (1936) masked hero in comics (other masked heroes like the Shadow and Zorro had previously appeared in pulps); the face covering worn by The Clock was nothing more than a simple black cloth with a flounce on the bottom.
