= Madam Fatal =

- Madam Fatal in Crack Comics #22.

Publication information
- Publisher: Quality Comics; DC Comics
- First appearance: Crack Comics #1 (May 1940)
- Created by: Art Pinajian

In-story information
- Alter ego: Richard Stanton
- Abilities: Skilled hand to hand combatant Expert cane fighter Peak physical condition High-level intellect and intuition Superior investigative skills Professional acting, disguise and theatric skills

Madam Fatal is a fictional character and a comic book superhero active during the Golden Age of Comic Books. Madam Fatal was created and originally illustrated by artist/writer Art Pinajian and the debut of the character was in the Crack Comics #1 (May 1940), a crime/detective anthology series published by Quality Comics. Madam Fatal continued as a feature in that title but when the character was not well received, Madam Fatal made a last appearance in #22 (March 1942).

The character later appeared in some publications by DC Comics when DC Comics bought the rights to the character in 1956, along with a bulk buy of all Quality Comics. Madam Fatal has made scarce appearances since.

Madam Fatal is notable for being a male superhero who dressed up as an elderly woman and as such is the first cross-dressing hero. The original incarnation of the Red Tornado would become the first cross-dressing heroine later that year.

Australian punk band Madam Fatale took their name from the character.

== Fictional character biography ==
"She" was actually Richard Stanton, a handsome, pipe-smoking, dapper, middle-aged blonde Caucasian man who is exceptionally intelligent and intuitive, as well as being at the peak of his physical abilities. He had made a vast fortune successfully playing the Wall Street stock market of the late 1920s, a time of economic unrest, which incurred the jealousy of many of those close to him. In his private life, Stanton was also a widower and a single father, being the parent of a two-year-old (unnamed) girl. As well as being a successful financial investor, Stanton is also a lover of theatrics and a world-famous stage, theatre, radio and film actor living in Manhattan, until his wealthy and prominent celebrity status brought unwanted attention from costumed villains. Stanton's daughter was kidnapped by them and the police were unable to uncover their identities, but Stanton was, relying on his wits and superior investigative skills. As such, Stanton decided to take matters into his own hands after he deduced that the leader of the gang was John Carver, a crime kingpin who had been running extortion rackets in various cities.

As a civilian, Stanton had already been searching for Carver for eight years, after a fight they had and the threats that Carver had made. Prior to this, Carver had been the first man to love Stanton's late wife, and Carver had been jilted when she chose Stanton instead. After the kidnapping of Stanton's daughter, and when the police got nowhere, Stanton's wife was riddled with guilt as it was her previous connection with Carver which had brought about the whole scenario. She died of a broken heart.

Stanton was able to infiltrate the John Carver gang due to his convincing acting and stage disguise as an old, helpless, red-cloaked woman with a yellow walking cane which doubled as a sly quarterstaff. Once inside their lair Stanton then used his natural athleticism and physical abilities to wipe out the unsuspecting gang, and revealed his true identity to Carver. In the ensuing fight, Carver (a formidable fighter himself) knocked Stanton to the ground and attempted to shoot him with a revolver, but Stanton quickly pulled out a rug from underneath Carver, tripping him up, and Carver accidentally shot himself instead. In his dying breaths, the crime kingpin told Stanton his daughter was still alive, although held captive by another villain. He never revealed who before dying.

Stanton decided to retire from acting and continue down the path of a crime-fighter and bring other villains to justice, inspired by his first success, adopting the alter-ego Madam Fatal. Stanton made his last appearance on Broadway on May 1, 1930, as an old woman, which garnered Stanton praise and acclaim from the audience. After that he disappeared from public view altogether and became "Madam Fatal" full-time. Stanton would also use the alternate identity to attempt to locate his captive daughter, whom Carver had passed on to other villains. When the character rights were sold to DC Comics and DC decided not to continue the character, this plot point was not resolved contemporaneously, and it was not revealed which villain was actually holding Stanton's daughter until The Shade #4 in 2012.

The old woman disguise was aided strongly by his expert acting skills, being a former professional actor and female impersonator. This same disguise also often raised Stanton above suspicion, and made him an expert in confidence trickery, infiltration, stealth, information gathering, and melting anonymously into crowds. Madam Fatal was also aided on occasion by his pet parrot, Hamlet, his only connection to his previous life. Hamlet was named so because he was intelligent enough to recite Shakespeare, and would inspire and help Stanton remember important information.

== Powers and abilities ==
Although Stanton had no actual super powers to speak of, he was a strong, agile and athletic man at his physical peak and a skilled fighter with a powerful punch. He had a high level of intelligence and intuition which aided his investigative abilities and locating criminals. Madam Fatal often came up against criminal masterminds and supervillains such as Doctor Prowl (a black-masked, hat-wearing gentlemanly murderer with metal claws) and the Jester (a violent clown-themed thief who laughs at death) and their henchmen. However, Madam Fatal's disguise gave him an edge in physical combat as his foes would underestimate his strength and speed. Madam Fatal's yellow walking cane was also a formidable weapon in Stanton's hands as he was adept at using the cane as a weapon.

== Controversy and ridicule ==
Madam Fatal was never a popular character given the cross-dressing angle, which is perhaps part of the reason why DC Comics decided not to further run with the character and limited him to light-hearted jibes made by other comic book heroes.

The character has often been ridiculed, such as in an article on Cracked.com which listed the character as one of the "7 crappiest super heroes in comic book history".

== Madam Fatal at DC Comics ==
DC Comics acquired the rights to all the former Quality Comics characters in 1956, but Madam Fatal has rarely surfaced.

Outside of regular DC Universe continuity, comix writer Kim Deitch (Hollywoodland) did a story in 1972 that purported to be about Madam Fatal.

James Robinson and Paul Smith featured Madam Fatal in a cameo in 1993's The Golden Age #4. The character appears in a panel surrounded by the Fiddler, and the Gambler, who all appear to be courting the cross-dressing hero while other characters (including Wildfire, Harlequin, and the Psycho-Pirate) stand around giggling (apparently knowing Madam Fatal's true gender).

In a scene in JSA #1 (Aug. 1999) depicting the funeral of the first Sandman, Wildcat wonders whether his own funeral will "be like the time they buried Madam Fatal here, and no one turned up for the funeral but the touring cast of La Cage aux Folles?"

James Robinson gives the character a prominent role in The Shade #4 (2012), set in 1944. In this issue Madam Fatal finally learns the location of his daughter.

== See also ==
- The novel Madame Doubtfire and subsequent comedy film adaptation
