= Jim Rugg =

American cartoonist and illustrator

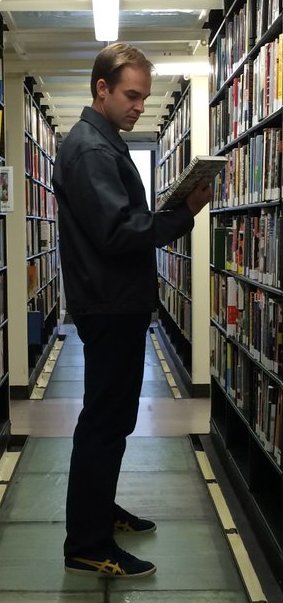
- Rugg in 2019
- Born: February 1, 1977 (age 49)
- Areas: Cartoonist, Writer, Penciller, Inker, Letterer, Colourist
- Notable works: Street Angel; Afrodisiac

Jim Rugg (born February 1, 1977) is an American cartoonist and illustrator from Pittsburgh known for his tongue-in-cheek evocation of 1970s-era comics and pop culture. His graphic novels and comics collections include Street Angel, Afrodisiac, The P.L.A.I.N. Janes and Janes in Love, One Model Nation, and The Guild.

Rugg has also produced short comics for VH1, New York magazine, True Porn, Meathaus, Cinema Sewer, Strange Tales, the SPX Annual, Project: Superior, Dark Horse Presents, and the Next Issue Project.

Rugg also co-hosted the YouTube channel Cartoonist Kayfabe with fellow Pittsburgh native cartoonist Ed Piskor.

== Biography ==
A time lapse drawing by Rugg of Gen13, from 2011

Rugg was born in the town of Connellsville, Pennsylvania and moved to Pittsburgh. His art influences include Frank Miller, Erik Larsen, David Lapham, Jack Kirby, David Mazzuchelli, Mike Mignola, the Hernandez brothers, Robert Crumb, Dan Clowes, Chris Ware, and Julie Doucet. Rugg is also inspired by television shows like The Office and Arrested Development, the films of Wes Anderson, Kōbō Abe’s writing, Todd Hido’s photography, and Toba Khedoori's drawings and paintings. He has a BFA in graphic design and painting from a small liberal arts college.

While working as a graphic designer, Rugg met and began working with writer Brian Maruca. The result, Street Angel, was self-published as a mini-comic, where it eventually found its way to the publisher Slave Labor Graphics. The first five issues of Street Angel were collected as a trade paperback by SLG Publishing in 2005.

After the cancellation of a video game project and The P.L.A.I.N. Janes series in 2008, Rugg considered leaving the comics business. His fortunes began turning around in 2009, when he began working on Image Comics' One Model Nation and Dark Horse Comics' The Guild.

In 2010 Rugg (along with co-writer Maruca) released Afrodisiac, collecting stories previously published in anthologies along with new material. (The character first appeared in the pages of Street Angel). The book is a detailed pastiche of 1970s "trash" culture, especially the blaxploitation heroic archetype. The titular hero is an over-the-top '70s-era, kung fu-fighting pimp character depicted in adventures that cross multiple comics styles, from space aliens and flying saucers to dinosaurs to Richard Nixon to Hercules to giant monsters to Dracula. Afrodisiac's production design faithfully evokes the visual style of old comic books, down to faded color schemes and wrinkled, creased covers.

On March 30, 2024, Rugg announced that he had decided to end his professional relationship, such as Cartoonist Kayfabe, with Ed Piskor as a result of allegations against Piskor. Because of a number of factors, Piskor committed suicide two days later.

Rugg currently teaches in the MFA Visual Narrative program at the School of Visual Arts.

== Cartoonist Kayfabe and comic historian ==
Ed Piskor and Rugg discussing Cartoonist Kayfabe in 2019

The Cartoonist Kayfabe series created by Ed Piskor and Jim Rugg, significantly impacted the comic book community by revisiting classic comic books, discussing the processes and stories behind them, and featuring notable figures from the industry. The YouTube show has produced over 1,800 videos in its library since its creation. One of the achievements of the series was bringing together Kevin Eastman and Peter Laird for commentaries on their Teenage Mutant Ninja Turtles comics. Eastman and Laird, who had not collaborated in years, were invited to discuss their original TMNT comics, providing insights into their creation and evolution of the series. This reunion was particularly special for fans and scholars of comics, as it not only highlighted the creative synergy between the two but also explored the cultural impact of TMNT. The episodes served as a deep dive into the artistic and narrative choices that shaped the TMNT universe, offering fans a rare behind-the-scenes look at the making of a franchise that has remained popular across decades.

== Awards ==
Rugg was nominated for a 2010 Ignatz Award for Outstanding Minicomic for Rambo 3.5. In 2011, Afrodisiac was nominated for an Eisner Award in the humor category, and in 2015, Rugg won the Eisner for best publication design for Little Nemo: Dream Another Dream.

He served on the Ignatz Award jury in 2006.

== Bibliography ==
- Street Angel (SLG Publishing, 2005) ISBN 1-59362-012-8 – co-written with Brian Maruca
- The P.L.A.I.N. Janes (DC Comics/Minx, 2007) – written by Cecil Castellucci
- Janes in Love (DC/Minx, 2008) – written by Cecil Castellucci
- Afrodisiac (Adhouse Books, 2010) ISBN 1-935233-06-8 – co-written with Brian Maruca
- One Model Nation (Image Comics, 2010) – written by Courtney Taylor
- The Guild (3-issue limited series, Dark Horse Comics, 2010) – written by Felicia Day
- Hulk: Grand Design (2 issues, Marvel Comics, May–June 2022)

== Sources ==
- Jim Rugg at the Comic Book DB (archived from the original)
- Manning, Shaun. "Rugg Raps About Afrodisiac," Comic Book Resource (October 27, 2009).
