= Clock (character) =

Hero from the Golden Age of Comics

The Clock
- Funny Picture Stories #1 (November 1936) by Comic Magazine Company

Publication information
- Publisher: Comics Magazine Company; Ultem Publications; Quality Comics
- First appearance: Funny Pages #6 and Funny Picture Stories #1 (November 1936)
- Created by: George Brenner

In-story information
- Alter ego: Brian O'Brien
- Partnerships: Pug Brady; Butch

The Clock is a fictional masked crime-fighter character created in 1936, during the Golden Age of Comic Books. He was the first fully-masked hero to appear in American comic books.

== History ==
Created by cartoonist George Brenner, the Clock first appeared in the Comics Magazine Company publication Funny Picture Stories #1 (Nov 1936). According to Secondary Superheroes of Golden Age Comics:

The Clock appeared on the first cover, wearing a hat, a tux, and a black handkerchief-style face mask, holding a cane, both arms up as he was frisked by a gang of bad guys... The hero was a variation on the masked detectives of the pulps and radio. He hung out in "a sub-cellar located below the heart of the city", and got a villain to talk by showing him some of the furnishings he had around: an iron maiden, a rack, and a thumb-hanging device. Helped out by a gimmick in his cane, the Clock nabbed the gang of jewel thieves he was after and turned them in to the police. A note he left for a police captain burst into flames shortly after it was read.

A hypnotist with a secret underground lair, his minimalist costume as a master of disguise was a three-piece suit and mask. The Clock used a number of gadgets (including a cane whose head becomes a projectile, and a diamond stud which fires tear gas), and customarily left a calling card with a clock face and "The Clock Has Struck". The Clock's secret identity was eventually disclosed as Brian O'Brien, a wealthy member of high society.

According to Jess Nevins' Encyclopedia of Golden Age Superheroes, "the criminals he fights are usually ordinary gangsters and Nazis, but there is also the occasional mad scientist and superhuman (like the massive, bullet-proof idiot Stuporman)".

The character appeared in Funny Pages #6–11 and other titles from the Comics Magazine Company, including Detective Picture Stories and Keen Detective Funnies. In 1937 the company was bought by Ultem Publications, which encountered financial difficulties and sold the Clock (and other characters) to Quality Comics. Ultem was purchased and renamed Centaur Publications; despite the sale to Quality, Centaur continued to reprint old Clock stories.

The Clock continued to be written and drawn in new stories by Brenner in Feature Funnies (later retitled Feature Comics) from #3 (December 1937) through #31 (April 1940), and was featured on the cover of issues #25, #28 and #29. The Clock feature was moved to Crack Comics #1 (May 1940).

When Centaur sold the Clock to Quality, he acquired a sidekick. He was first assisted by Pat "Pug" Brady, a former boxer who looked exactly like Brian O'Brien; they met when picking each other's pockets in Crack Comics #1. Pug's disguise was even more minimal, consisting of a handkerchief worn like a bandanna. In his first story with the Clock, Pug discovered his secret identity and killed another character who made the same discovery.

In Crack Comics #21 Pug disappeared without explanation as the Clock, shot, crawled into a basement to die. A young girl, Butch Buchanan, was squatting in the basement and nursed him back to health. She became his "moll", and from issue #22 his costume was similar to that of the Spirit. The Clock alternated appearances on the cover of Crack Comics with the Black Condor until #19, continuing as a backup feature of that title until his final appearance in Crack Comics #35 (Autumn 1944).

After Quality Comics ceased operations in 1956, DC Comics acquired the rights to its characters. It did not renew the copyright for most of its characters (including the Clock), allowing them to fall into the public domain, and has not used the Clock apart from a few mentions. In the DC Universe, the Clock was initially said to have been killed in 1944 (the year of his final appearance). In Starman Vol. 2 #19 the Shade wrote in his journal: "Brian O'Brien told me the reports of his death were greatly exaggerated". In Starman #20 O'Brien was said to be active in Chicago, despite several Golden Age references to his home city as a seaport.

== Other versions ==
In 1992, Malibu Comics published 20 issues of The Protectors, starring a superhero team including several characters from the Centaur line. In this universe, Brian O'Brien was the first costumed hero. With the advent of super-powered heroes, he gave up crimefighting and joined the army. O'Brien rose through the ranks, eventually becoming President of the United States.

In 2013, Dynamite Entertainment published an eight-issue miniseries, Masks, with several pulp and comic-book characters fighting the Justice Party (which has taken over New York State). In issue #7, Brian O'Brien is revealed as the shadowy figure behind the Party.
