= Spider (DC Comics) =

Alias the Spider

Publication information
- Publisher: Originally Quality Comics; Later DC Comics
- First appearance: Tom; Crack Comics #1 (May 1940); Lucas; Starman vol. 2, #47 (Oct. 1998); Thomas; Seven Soldiers #0 (April 2005)
- Created by: Tom; Paul Gustavson; Lucas; Geoff Johns; James Robinson; Thomas; Grant Morrison

In-story information
- Alter ego: Tom Ludlow Hallaway; Lucas Ludlow-Dalt; Thomas Ludlow Dalt
- Team affiliations: (Tom, Thomas); Seven Soldiers of Victory (Tom); All-Star Squadron
- Notable aliases: Thomas; I, Spyder

"Alias the Spider" is a superhero feature from the Golden Age of Comic Books that appeared in Quality Comics' Crack Comics for nearly three years, starting with issue #1 in 1940. He was created by writer-artist Paul Gustavson.

The original Golden Age version of the character is in the public domain, but the rights to all subsequent versions are currently owned by DC Comics.

== Publication history ==
Only one adventure of the Spider has ever been reprinted by DC Comics, which acquired the Quality Comics stable of characters when that company went out of business in 1956: the story from Crack Comics #25, in Detective Comics #441.

The Spider later made sporadic cameo appearances in All-Star Squadron and The Young All-Stars. As a Quality Comics character, he was one of the heroes who went with Uncle Sam to protect Earth-X during World War II, becoming part of the Freedom Fighters. This was the fulfillment of a storyline that began in Justice League of America #107-108, which introduced most of Quality Comics' characters to the DC Universe. Previously only Plastic Man and Blackhawk had been used.

== Fictional character biography ==
=== Tom Hallaway ===
==== Quality Comics version ====
The Spider is playboy Tom Hallaway, who had tired of seeing criminals have their own way harassing and murdering honest citizens, so he adopts the guise of the Spider to settle the score. The Spider fights crime in a yellow shirt and blue shorts. He is armed with a bow and arrows, a special car known as the Black Widow, and the assistance of his valet Chuck (who helps Hallaway in both of his identities without anyone making any sort of connection). Hallaway uses a special arrow called the "Spider's Seal", which has a flat disc on the end; he shoots it at thugs' hands to disarm them.

According to Jess Nevins' Encyclopedia of Golden Age Superheroes, the Spider "fights enemies like the Crow, the pirate Falcon, Iggie the Yogi, and the Yellow Peril Yellow Scorpion".

==== DC Comics version ====
In the continuity that followed DC Comics' "Crisis on Infinite Earths" company-crossover storyline, the Spider is not heroic. Now given the full name Tom Ludlow Hallaway, he did not become the Spider out of an altruistic motive, but rather because he was a smuggler, kidnapper and murderer who used the guise of a superhero as a cover to help him eliminate the competition. Though originally based in St. Louis, Missouri, he is a member of the Ludlow clan from New England. The family had a history of ill-gotten gains, having originally amassed its vast wealth by killing their partners in a business enterprise.

Instead of working with the Freedom Fighters, this revised Spider is a member of the Seven Soldiers of Victory, taking the place of Green Arrow and Speedy. During the final case of the Seven Soldiers, the Spider betrays them to their old enemy, the Iron Hand. The Spider kills the Vigilante's friend Billy Gunn, but is stopped by Wing.

With the only people who knew him to be a criminal dead, the Spider continues his heroic facade. He becomes the hero-in-residence of Keystone City, but his Ludlow heritage catches up with him, as does the Shade. The Spider had been planning to face the Shade for quite a while. He had saved fragments of the Shade's shadow substance, intending to plant them at the scene of a double murder, that of Jay Garrick (the Flash) and his wife Joan. Shade is able to prevent the Garricks' murders, but convinces his old enemy the Flash not to publicize his role.

=== Lucas Ludlow-Dalt ===
The Spider's son, Lucas Ludlow-Dalt, takes up the bow and arrow (and his original yellow and blue costume) in the pages of Starman, helping other villains lay siege to Opal City during the "Grand Guignol" storyline. This Spider had trained all his life for revenge on the Shade, and comes close to getting it. Matt O'Dare prevents the Spider from killing Shade, and he is chased off to parts unknown.

The Spider takes up his bow again in the series Hawkman series, facing off against Hawkman, Hawkgirl, and Green Arrow. Green Arrow shoots the Spider in his aiming eye with an arrow, hoping to end the criminal's career by maiming him. The Spider manages to rapidly relearn archery from a new perspective.

=== I, Spyder ===
Seven Soldiers #0 introduced a third Spider, although he spelled the name "I, Spyder". This character, named Thomas Ludlow Dalt, was one of five heroes brought together by the Vigilante to form a new incarnation of the Seven Soldiers of Victory. Prior to this, he was abducted by the Seven Unknown Men of Slaughter Swamp after accepting a contract to kill them at their home base. It was revealed that the Seven had hired him in order to lure him into their headquarters so they could hopefully prepare him to defeat the Sheeda. Thomas was given several augmentations in terms of his abilities and gear which included new clothes, a jet-black helicopter with a black widow hourglass symbol on its base as well as 'cold blood and perfect aim'. This Spyder is the son of Thomas Hallaway and the brother of Lucas, who usurps the identity by killing his brother. His glory is short lived however, as he is killed by the Sheeda and resurrected as their agent.

== Other characters named Spider ==
Frank Stacy is a scientist who operated as a spider-themed criminal and fought Plastic Man.

== In other media ==
A character loosely based on the Frank Stacy version of Spider appears in The Plastic Man Comedy/Adventure Show episode "The Spider Takes a Bride".
