= One Model Nation =

Book by Jim Rugg

- Author: Courtney Taylor-Taylor
- Illustrator: Jim Rugg
- Cover artist: Jim Rugg
- Language: English
- Publisher: Image Comics
- Publication date: 11 November 2009
- Publication place: United States
- Media type: Print
- ISBN: 1-60706-157-0

Totalwerks, Vol. 1 (1969–1977)

Studio album by One Model Nation
- Released: 31 January 2012
- Genre: Krautrock
- Label: The End

One Model Nation is a graphic novel written by Dandy Warhols frontman Courtney Taylor-Taylor and illustrated by Jim Rugg about a fictional 1970s German krautrock band. It was released on 11 November 2009. An accompanying studio album titled Totalwerks, Vol. 1 (1969–1977), a greatest hits album by the fictional band, was released on 31 January 2012.

== Critical reception ==
Wired called it "intriguing and humorous". Film director Gus Van Sant called it an "Awesomely executed story by Courtney Taylor-Taylor. Great art – you must read it." Ain't It Cool News wrote that it was "worth a look if you haven't read it already, especially if you're an indie comics fan. It's a good story that should appeal to those who like comics that have realistic characters along with a small bit of socio-political history mixed in."

== Track listing ==
No.	Title	Length
1.	"Transmission"	3:07
2.	"East Berlin"	4:24
3.	"Mission to Mars (There's No Need to Mess Up the Trip)"	4:07
4.	"Russian Standard Time"	1:34
5.	"The Dominator"	4:02
6.	"Bicycles"	4:26
7.	"What Is the Plan?"	3:11
8.	"Throaty Neumann"	3:26
9.	"Midnight Now You're Walking"	5:14
10.	"Universal Time"	3:18
11.	"Gypsum Noggur"	7:57
