= Street Angel (comics) =

Alternative comic book limited series

Publication information
- Publisher: Slave Labor Graphics (2004–2005); Tapas (2016–2017); Image Comics (2017–2019)
- Schedule: Irregular
- Publication date: March 2004 – March 2005; October 2016 – October 2017; April 2017 – October 2019
- No. of issues: 5

Creative team
- Created by: Jim Rugg; Brian Maruca
- Written by: Jim Rugg; Brian Maruca
- Artist: Jim Rugg
- Letterer: Jim Rugg

Collected editions
- Street Angel: ISBN 1-59362-012-8

Street Angel is an alternative comic book limited series by Jim Rugg and Brian Maruca. It was published in 2004 by Slave Labor Graphics, and lasted five issues. In 2016 Jim Rugg would start posting new and old street angel comics online as webcomics, both to his personal website and the Tapas syndicate. Five graphic novels and a one shot were later released by Image Comics between 2017 and 2018, two of them being re-releases of web comics. These books were printed at a larger scale than the original issues, hard cover and full color. They were collected as a single trade paperback in 2019.

== Plot ==
The story takes place in Wilkesborough, the worst ghetto in Angel City. The title character is 12-year-old Jesse Sanchez (13-year-old after a bout of time travel), "a dangerous martial artist... and the world's greatest homeless skateboarder." She handles ninjas, pirates and hunger with skill, aplomb, and help from her friends. Street Angel is an unironic alternative take on comics, mixing a variety of styles, inspirations and genres to "bring the fantastical to the mundane". None of the comics share any continuity.

== Film ==
A live-action short film titled Street Angel was produced in 2008 and released in March 2009, starring Kate Bell as Jesse. It is written and directed by Lucas Testro and produced by Adam Bishop, adapting Issue 1 of the comic series. The film score was composed by Benjamin Speed.

The film was nominated for a 2009 MPSE Golden Reel Award for best sound editing in a student film. as it was made by students at the Australian Film, Television and Radio School in Sydney. It screened at many festivals, won several other awards, including the Best Action Short Film at the Maelstrom International Fantastic Film Festival in 2010, Best International Film at the Phoenix Comic-Con Film Festival in 2010; and Best Director at the 2010 Phoenix Comic-Con Film Festival.

== Bibliography ==
- Street Angel #1–5
- Comics Festival, a one-shot published by the Toronto Comic Arts Festival for Free Comic Book Day, 2005
- Street Angel: After School Kung Fu Special (Image Comics, hard cover, 2017, ISBN 978-1-5343-0287-7)
- Ghost Monster (Self published online, 2016)
- Xmas Special (Self published online, 2016)
- The Street Angel Gang (Image Comics, hard cover, 2017, ISBN 978-1-5343-0366-9)
- Street Angel: Superhero For A Day (Image Comics, hard cover, 2017, ISBN 978-1-5343-0726-1)
- Street Angel Goes To Juvie (Image Comics, hard cover, 2018, ISBN 978-1-5343-0800-8)
- Street Angel's Dog (Image Comics, a one-shot for Free Comic Book Day, 2018)
- Street Angel Vs Ninjatech (Image Comics, hard cover, 2018, ISBN 978-1-5343-0856-5)

=== Collected editions ===
- Street Angel (Slave Labor Graphics, trade paperback collecting limited series, FCBD story, 208 pages, July 2005, ISBN 1-59362-012-8)
- Street Angel: Princess of Poverty (AdHouse Books, hard cover collecting all Street Angel comics made prior to 2015, 2015, ISBN 1-935233-32-7)
- Street Angel: Deadliest Girl Alive (Image Comics, trade paperback collecting the hard cover books, Street Angel's Dog, Ghost Monster and Xmas Special, 240 pages, 2019, ISBN 978-1-5343-1350-7)
