= Alan Weiss (comics) =

American comics artist and writer (born 1948)

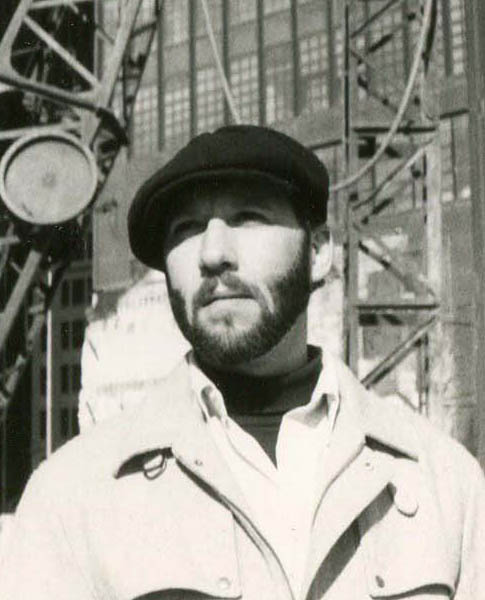
- Weiss in 1984
- Born: Alan Lee Weiss; March 7, 1948 (age 78) Chicago, Illinois, US
- Areas: Writer, Penciller, Inker
- Notable works: Warlock, The Avengers, KISS, Captain America and Spider-Man
- Spouse: Pauline Bigornia Weiss

Alan Weiss (born March 7, 1948) is an American comics artist and writer known for his work for DC Comics and Marvel Comics.

== Career ==
Alan Weiss began his professional comics career at Warren Publishing by drawing the story "Gunsmoke Charly!" in Creepy #35 (Sept. 1970). The following year, he began working for Marvel Comics as well where he drew The Avengers, Captain America, Daredevil, Sub-Mariner, and The Amazing Spider-Man.

Weiss recalled in a 2006 interview there was a "lost" Adam Warlock story, which if completed would have been reminiscent of the Jonathan Swift novel Gulliver's Travels. Portions of it were printed in the second volume of Marvel Masterworks: Warlock. The remainder of the artwork was lost in a New York City taxicab in 1976.

In 1977, Weiss was one of the artists on the first issue of Marvel Comics Super Special which featured the rock band Kiss in a 40-page fictional adventure written by Steve Gerber. Kiss reappeared in an occult adventure in issue #5 (1978) which was co-written by Weiss. In April 1978, Weiss and writer E. Nelson Bridwell revamped the Captain Marvel character for DC with Weiss providing more realistic art for the series. Dennis O'Neil and Weiss created the character Calypso in The Amazing Spider-Man #209 (Oct. 1980).

Weiss created the Steelgrip Starkey and the All-Purpose Power Tool limited series for Marvel Comics' Epic Comics comics line in 1986 and War Dancer for Defiant Comics in 1994. Weiss has worked on DC Comics' alternate universe series Elseworlds, co-writing and pencilling the Batman graphic novel The Blue, the Grey and the Bat as well as Paradox Press' The Big Book Of series, doing many pages on a variety of historical topics. From 2002 to 2005, he contributed work to Tom Strong's Terrific Tales published by America's Best Comics.

His work has appeared in the comic books The Human Drama, Big Apple Comix, The Twilight Zone, Boris Karloff Tales of Mystery, and Our Love Story; in Warren Publishing's black-and-white horror comics magazines Creepy and Eerie; and the satirical magazines National Lampoon and Blast.

Inker Joe Rubinstein called Weiss "the most difficult guy in the business to ink, without exception." He added that this also made him one of his favorite artists to ink, because Weiss's work was so intricate that he couldn't tell what the final art would look like until he had finished inking it.

== Bibliography ==
=== Archie Comics ===
- Lancelot Strong, the Shield #1 (1983)

=== Atlas/Seaboard Comics ===
- Brute #3 (1975)

=== Big Apple Productions ===
- Big Apple Comix #1 (1975): "The Battery's Down" pencils and inks

=== DC Comics ===
- All-Star Western (El Diablo) (1971) #5 "The Devil Rides for Vengeance!" pencils; #7 "The Gypsy Curse" pencils
- Armageddon: Alien Agenda #3 (1992) "The West Years of Our Lives" pencils
- Batman: The Blue, the Grey, and the Bat graphic novel (1993) co-writer, pencils
- Heroes Against Hunger #1 (Superman and Batman) (1986)
- House of Mystery #205 (1972) "Over the High Side" pencils
- House of Secrets (1971) #92 "It's Better to Give" pencils; #94 "A Bottle of Incense...A Whiff of the Past!" pencils and co-inks
- Korak, Son of Tarzan #46 (1972)
- Mystery in Space #112 (1980) "Howl" pencils
- Richard Dragon, Kung-Fu Fighter #2 (1975) "If You've Got to Die...Die Fighting!" "A Dragon Fights Alone" pencils
- Secret Origins vol. 2 #34 (Captain Atom); #50 (1988–1990)
- Shazam #34 (1978)
- The Superman Family #186 (Supergirl) (1977) "Rendezvous with Reality" penciller
- Super-Team Family #11 (The Flash and Supergirl) (1977)
- Weird Worlds #1–3 (1972)
- Who's Who: The Definitive Directory of the DC Universe #4 (1985)
- Young Love #94, 124 (1972–1977)

==== America's Best Comics ====
- Tom Strong #8 (2000) cover and "Riders of the Lost Mesa" pencils and inks
- Tom Strong's Terrific Tales #1–12 (2002–2005) "Young Tom Strong" series: pencils and inks #1–7, 12; pencils #8–12, covers #3, #11

==== Paradox Press ====
- The Big Book of Urban Legends (1994) "The Bullet Through the Balls" pencils and inks
- The Big Book of Freaks (1996) "Omi the Great" pencils and inks
- The Big Book of Little Criminals (1996) "The Royal Moll" pencils and inks
- The Big Book of Losers (1997) "The Dalton Gang's Last Raid" pencils and inks
- The Big Book of Scandal (1997) "Death of a Mystery Man" pencils and inks
- The Big Book of the Weird Wild West (1998) "Ned Buntline: King of the Dime Novelists" pencils and inks

=== Defiant ===
- Defiant Genesis #1 (1993) cover pencil and ink
- War Dancer #1–6 (1994–1995) creator, writer #1–6; pencils #1–3, #5–6, covers #1–6

=== Gold Key Comics ===
- Boris Karloff Tales of Mystery #36 (1971) "Troll Bridge" pencil and ink
- The Twilight Zone #39 (1971)

=== Marvel Comics ===
- Amazing High Adventure #2 (1985) "Palm Sunday" pencils and inks
- The Amazing Spider-Man #209 (1980) cover and "To Salvage My Honor" pencils
- The Avengers #215 (1982) cover and "All the Ways of Power!" pencils; #216 (1982) cover and "...To Avenge the Avengers!" pencils
- Captain America #164 (1973) "Queen of the Werewolves" pencils and inks
- The Cat #4 (1973)
- Daredevil #83 (1972) "The Widow Accused" pencils
- Deadly Hands of Kung Fu #2 (1974)
- Dracula Lives #1 (1973) "Suffer Not A Witch" pencils; #3 (1973) "Castle of the Undead" pencils
- Heroes for Hope Starring the X-Men #1 (1985)
- Iron Man #136 (1980)
- John Carter, Warlord of Mars Annual #3 (1979)
- Kull and the Barbarians #2–3 (Solomon Kane) (1975)
- Marvel Comics Super Special #1 (penciller), #5 (writer) (Kiss) (1977–1978)
- Marvel Fanfare #14 (Inhumans); #49 (Doctor Strange) (1984–1990)
- Official Handbook of the Marvel Universe #3, 8–10 (1983)
- Official Handbook of the Marvel Universe Deluxe Edition #3, 9 (1986)
- Our Love Story #15–17 (1972)
- Power Man and Iron Fist #69 (1981)
- The Spectacular Spider-Man Annual #3 (1981)
- Sub-Mariner #54 (1972)
- What If...? #37 (Beast) (1983)

==== Epic Comics ====
- Steelgrip Starkey #1–6 (1986–1987) creator, writer; pencils #1–2, #6, covers #1–6
- Video Jack #5 (1988) "Wipeout Wipeout Wipeout" pencils

=== Image Comics ===
- Daring Escapes featuring Houdini #1–4 (1998–1999) pencils, covers #1–4
- Next Issue Project: Silver Streak Comics #24" (2009) "Captain Battle" pencils and inks
- Next Issue Project: Crack Comics #63" (2011) "Captain Triumph" writer and pencils, alternate cover
- Spawn #75 (1998) "Daring Escapes Preview" pencils

=== National Lampoon ===
- National Lampoon November 1982 "Robbers of the Lost Crock" pencils and inks

=== Warrant Publishing ===
- The Creeps #4 (2015) "Off to Feed the Wizard" writer, pencils and inks

=== Warren Publishing ===
- Creepy #35 (1970) "Gunsmoke Charly" writer, pencils and inks
- Eerie #34 (1971) "Lair of the Horned Men" writer, pencils and inks
