= Gill Fox =

American cartoonist

- Born: November 29, 1915
- Died: May 15, 2004 (aged 88) Redding Ridge, Connecticut, U.S.
- Areas: political cartoonist, comic book artist and editor, and animator
- Awards: Inkpot Award, 1978
- Spouse: Helen (née Fittipaldi)

Gilbert Theodore Fox (November 29, 1915 – May 15, 2004) was an American political cartoonist, comic book artist and editor, and animator.

== Biography ==
Fox began his career in animation at Max Fleischer's studio, but left due to labor unrest associated with a 1937 strike. He entered the comic book industry, working for a number of studios and companies, including DC Comics. During this period he was an editor and a cover artist for Quality Comics, with his work gracing the covers of such titles as Torchy and Plastic Man. In 1941, he wrote several weeks of continuity for the Spirit daily newspaper strip. A 1941 comic book written by Gill Fox, describing a German attack on Pearl Harbor, was published one month before the real-life Japanese attack on that U.S. naval base.

He left his editorial position at Quality in 1943 to serve in World War II, where he worked for Stars and Stripes. Once discharged from military service, Fox freelanced for Quality Comics until the early 1950s.

Fox later moved to advertising, working for the Johnstone and Cushing advertising agency. There he met Dik Browne, and assisted him on Browne's comic strip Hi and Lois. He also assisted/ghosted on several other strips as favors to friends.

Fox later worked as a political cartoonist for the Connecticut newspapers The Fairfield Citizen and the Connecticut Post; he was nominated for two Pulitzer Prizes. In the late 1980s, Fox created illustrations of the Teenage Mutant Ninja Turtles that were used on many licensed products.

He died in Redding Ridge, Connecticut, at age 88.

== Personal life and family ==
Fox was the brother of the illustrator Lorraine Fox.

Circa 1940, Gill Fox married Helen Fittipaldi, who died in 1998. They had two children, daughters Donna Morency and Susan Fox.
