= Quality Comics =

1937–1956 American comic book publisher

- Genre: Superhero, war, humor, romance, horror
- Predecessor: Comic Favorites, Inc.
- Founded: 1937; 89 years ago
- Founder: Everett M. "Busy" Arnold
- Defunct: December 1956; 69 years ago
- Fate: acquired to DC Comics
- Successor: DC Comics
- Headquarters: New York City, U.S.
- Key people: Eisner & Iger
- Products: Comic books
- Parent: Comic Magazines, Inc.

Quality Comics was an American comic book publishing company which operated from 1937 to 1956 and was a creative, influential force in what historians and fans call the Golden Age of Comic Books.

Notable, long-running titles published by Quality include Blackhawk, Feature Comics, G.I. Combat, Heart Throbs, Military Comics/Modern Comics, Plastic Man, Police Comics, Smash Comics, and The Spirit. While most of their titles were published by a company named Comic Magazines, from 1940 onwards all publications bore a logo that included the word "Quality". Notable creators associated with the company included Jack Cole, Reed Crandall, Will Eisner, Lou Fine, Gill Fox, Paul Gustavson, Bob Powell, and Wally Wood.

== History ==
Quality Comics was founded by Everett M. Arnold, a printer who saw the rapidly rising popularity of the comic book medium in the late 1930s. Deducing that Depression-era audiences wanted established quality and familiar comic strips for their hard-earned dimes, in 1937 the enterprising Arnold formed Comic Favorites, Inc. (in collaboration with three newspaper syndicates: the McNaught Syndicate, the Frank J. Markey Syndicate, and Iowa's Register and Tribune Syndicate).

Comic Favorites, Inc.'s first publication was Feature Funnies, which began primarily with color reprints of hit strips from all three co-owning syndicates (including Joe Palooka, Mickey Finn, and Dixie Dugan [all three from McNaught]) alongside a small number of original features. The original material came from various sources, including the company's in-house staff and freelancers (from the first issue) and the Eisner & Iger shop (from issue #3).

A frequent point of confusion is whether and how comic packaging shop Harry "A" Chesler was involved with the company's early days. Several sources list Chesler as the publisher of Feature Funnies, but the only primary source to mention Chesler is an interview with Arnold in which he describes purchasing content from the shop for Military Comics and Police Comics, neither of which began until 1941. An interview with Will Eisner quoted in The Quality Companion indicates that Arnold did not always own Comic Favorites, Inc., but the authors of that reference were unable to find any corroborating evidence amidst a large volume of evidence to the contrary.

In 1939, Arnold and the owners of the Register & Tribune Syndicate's parent company, brothers John Cowles Sr. and Gardner Cowles Jr., bought out the McNaught and Markey interests. Arnold became 50% owner of the newly formed Comic Magazines, Inc., the corporate entity that would publish the Quality Comics line. That year Quality released Smash Comics #1 (Aug. 1939), the company's first comic book with exclusively new material.

Initially buying features from Eisner & Iger, a prominent "packager" that produced comics on demand for publishers entering the new medium, Quality introduced such superheroes as Plastic Man and Kid Eternity, and non-superhero characters including the aviator hero Blackhawk. Quality also published comic-book reprints of Will Eisner's "The Spirit", the seven-page lead feature in a weekly 16-page, tabloid-sized, newsprint comic book, known colloquially as "The Spirit Section", distributed through Sunday newspapers.

Crack Comics #5 (Sept. 1940), first use of the "Quality Comic Group" logo (to right of "COMICS"). Cover art by Gill Fox.

The name Quality Comics debuted on the cover of Crack Comics #5 (Sept. 1940; see at right). "Seemingly never an official publishing title," the Connecticut Historical Society noted, "the Quality Comics Group is a trademarked name (presumably taking its name from Stamford's nickname of 'the Quality City') encompassing Comic Favorites Inc., E.M. Arnold Publications, Smash Comics, and any other imprints owned by Arnold". A 1954 federal document noted that the Quality Romance Group, owned by Everett M. and Claire C. Arnold, with an office at 347 Madison Avenue, in New York City, published two titles as Arnold Publications, Inc., two titles as Comic Favorites, Inc., and 14 titles as Comic Magazines, Inc.

By the mid-1950s, with television and paperback books drawing readers away from comic books in general and superheroes in particular, interest in Quality's characters had declined considerably. After a foray into other genres such as war, humor, romance and horror, the company ceased operations with comics cover-dated December 1956.

== Continuation of characters at other publishers ==
Many of Quality's character and title trademarks were sold to National Comics Publications (now DC Comics), which chose to keep only four series running: Blackhawk, G.I. Combat, Heart Throbs (each for another 100 or more issues), and Robin Hood Tales (for 8 issues).

There has been much confusion over whether the original Quality Comics and their characters are in public domain. The original copyrights for Quality's publications were never renewed, leaving them in the public domain. The trademarks to the characters were sold to DC, which has periodically published stories with them to renew the trademark.

Over the decades, DC revived other Quality characters. Plastic Man has starred in several short-lived series starting in 1966, as well as a Saturday morning cartoon from 1979–1981. The character went on to become a member of the Justice League in the 1990s.

According to DC canon, the Quality characters, before the 1985-1986 DC revamping event called Crisis on Infinite Earths, existed on two separate realities in the DC Multiverse: Earth-Quality and Earth-X. While Earth-Quality followed much the same history as the main Earths, Earth-X was radically different from most Earths, in that World War II continued there until 1973, enabling the Freedom Fighters to continue their fight against the Nazis. Following the Crisis, the Quality characters are transported to the main universe.

New, successor versions of the characters Black Condor and The Ray were introduced in 1992. Both were recruited into the Justice League. The new Ray had his own 1994–1996 series and occasionally appears as a reserve Justice League member. Yet another version of the Ray was introduced in 2011.

Some Quality Comics titles, including Blackhawk and Plastic Man, have been reprinted by DC, while lesser-known ones have been reprinted by AC Comics.

== Characters/features ==
- #711
- Alias the Spider
- Atomictot
- Black Condor
- Blackhawk
- Blue Tracer
- Bozo the Iron Man
- Captain Triumph
- The Clock
- Destiny
- Doll Man
- Espionage
- Firebrand
- Ghost of Flanders
- Human Bomb
- Invisible Hood
- Jester
- Kid Eternity
- Lady Luck
- Madam Fatal
- Magno the Magnetic Man
- Manhunter
- Merlin the Magician
- Midnight
- Miss America
- Mouthpiece
- Neon the Unknown
- Phantom Lady
- Plastic Man
- Quicksilver (later DC's Max Mercury)
- Raven
- Ray
- Red Bee
- Red Torpedo
- Spider Widow
- Spirit
- Stormy Foster
- Torchy
- Uncle Sam
- Wildfire
- Wonder Boy

== List of titles published by Quality Comics ==
Quality published comics from 1939 to 1956.

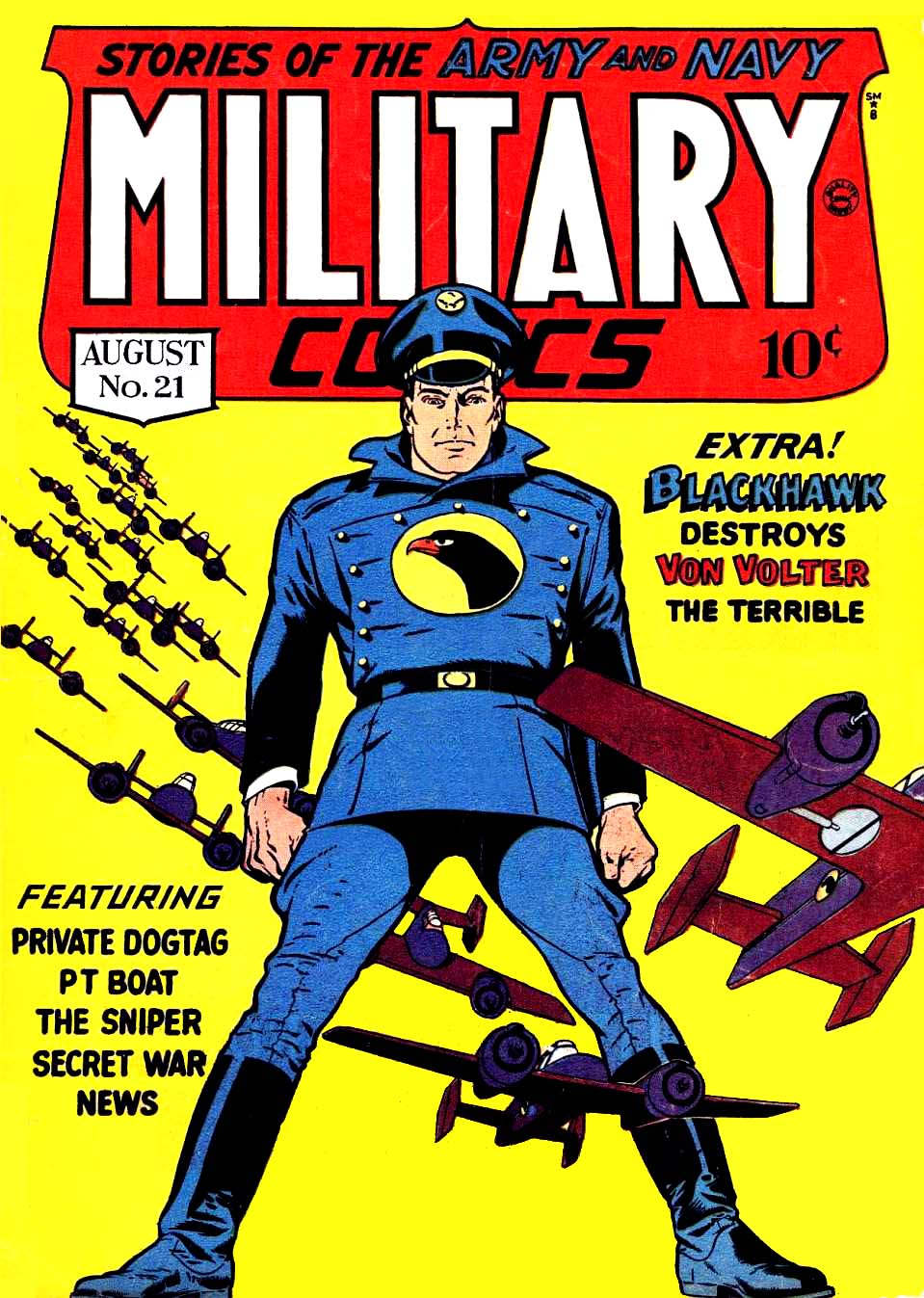
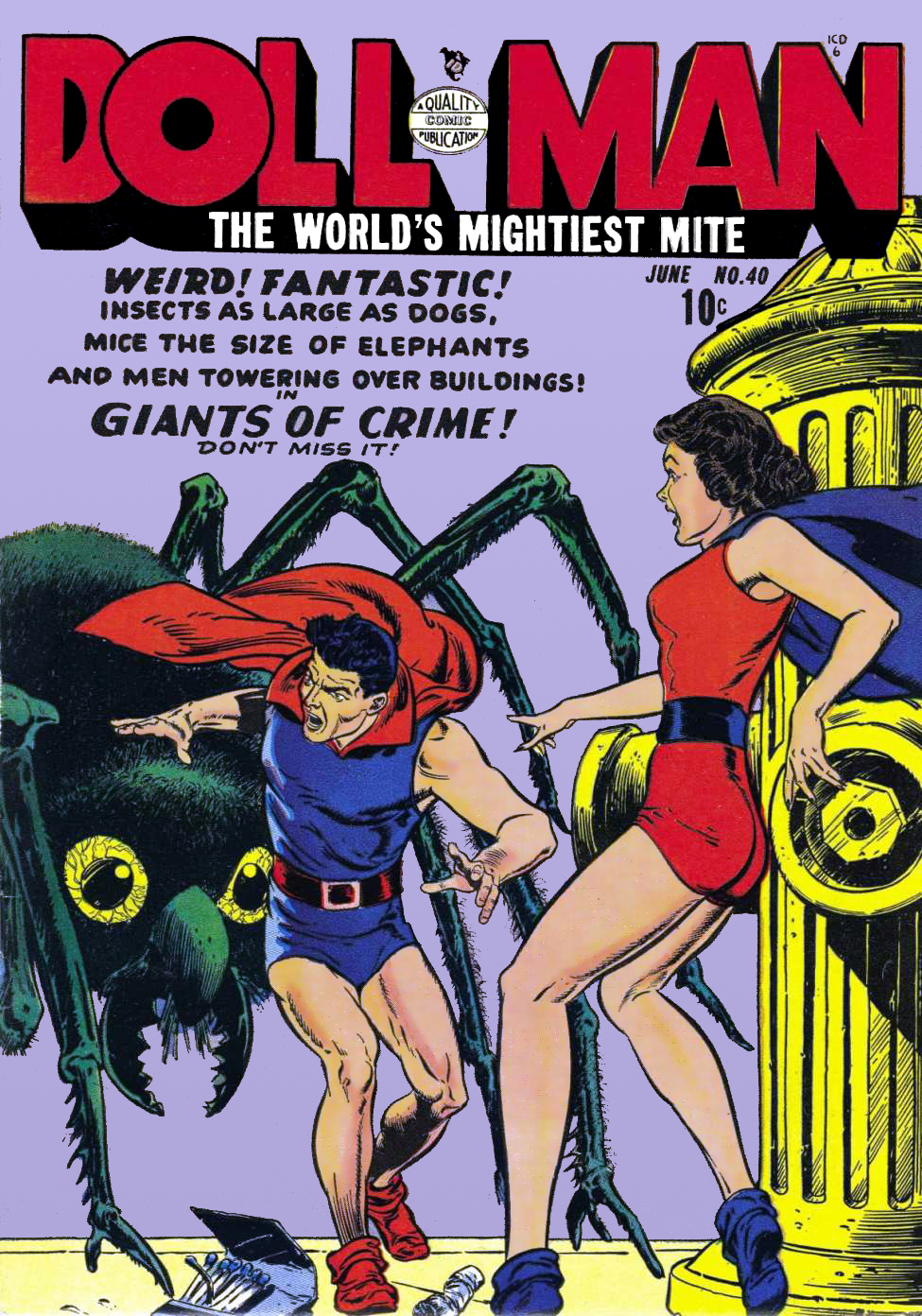
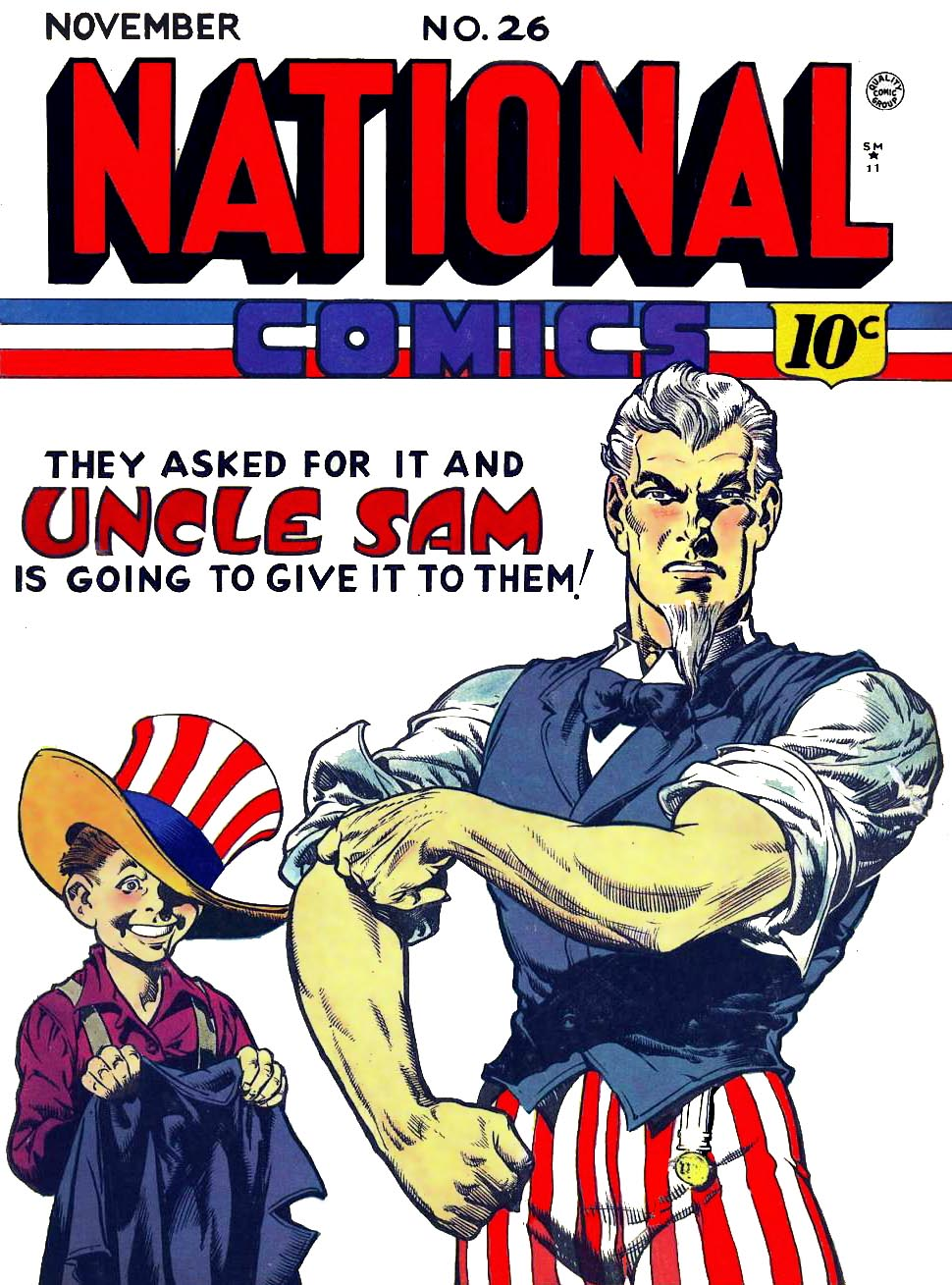
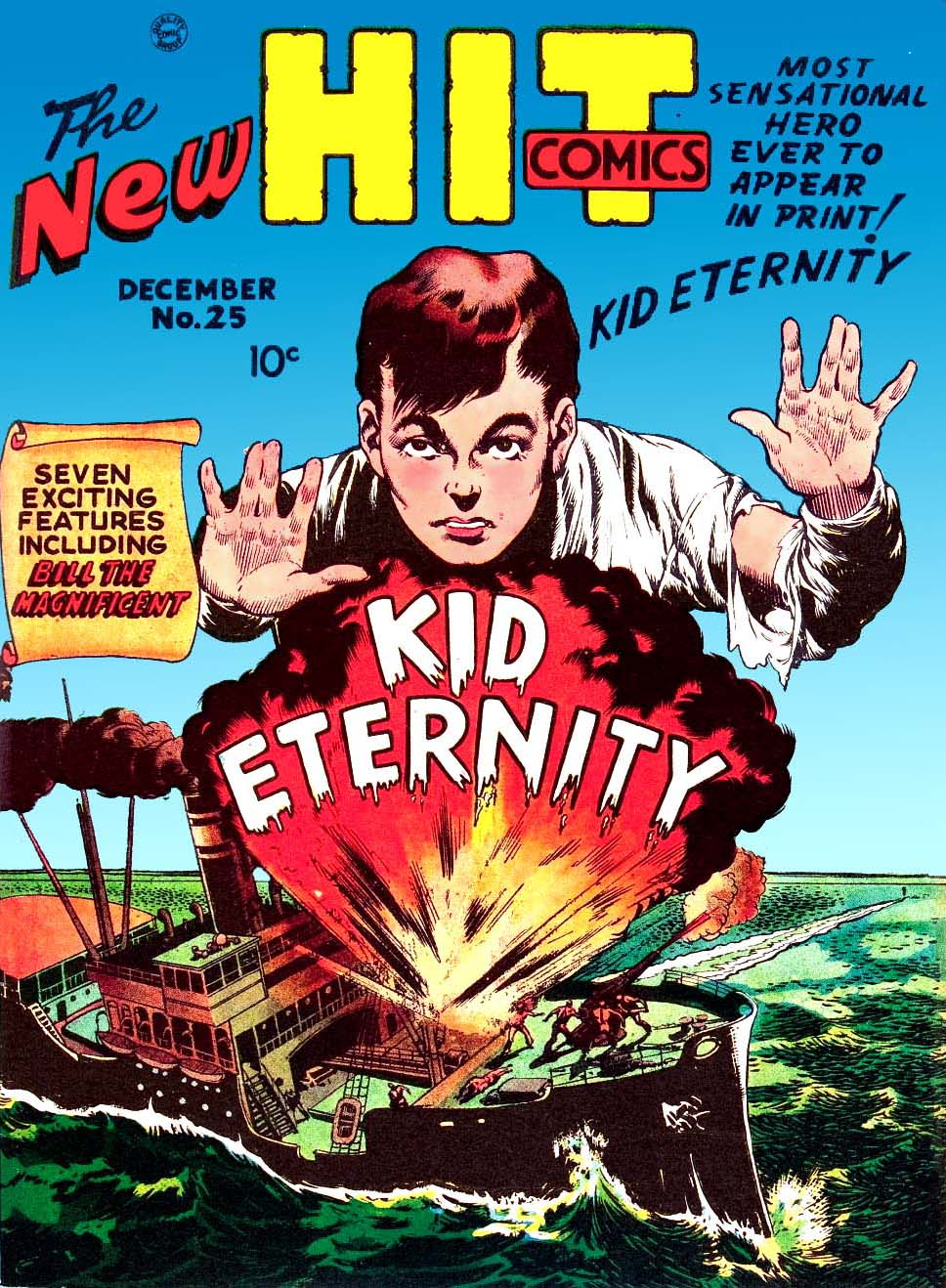
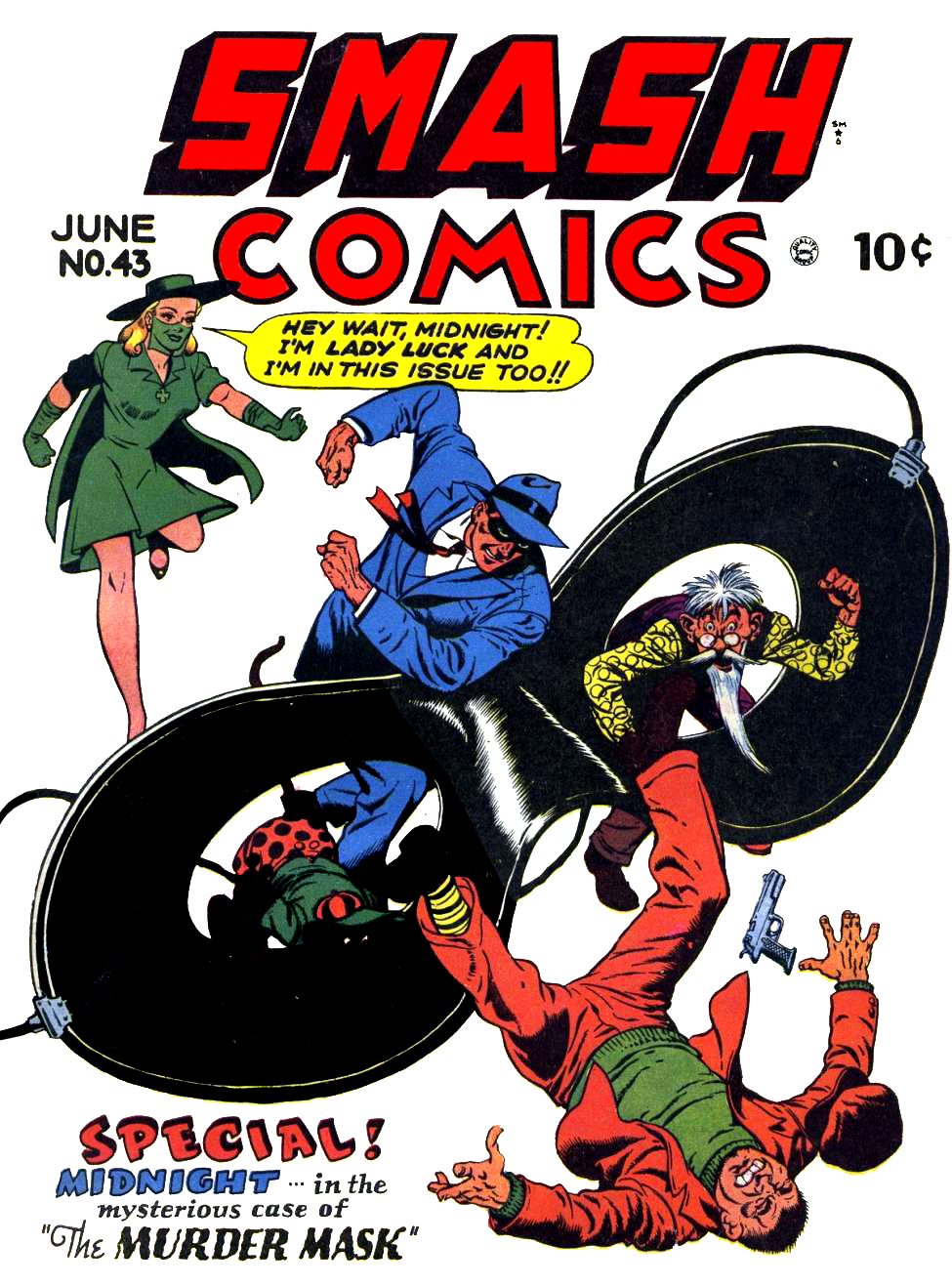
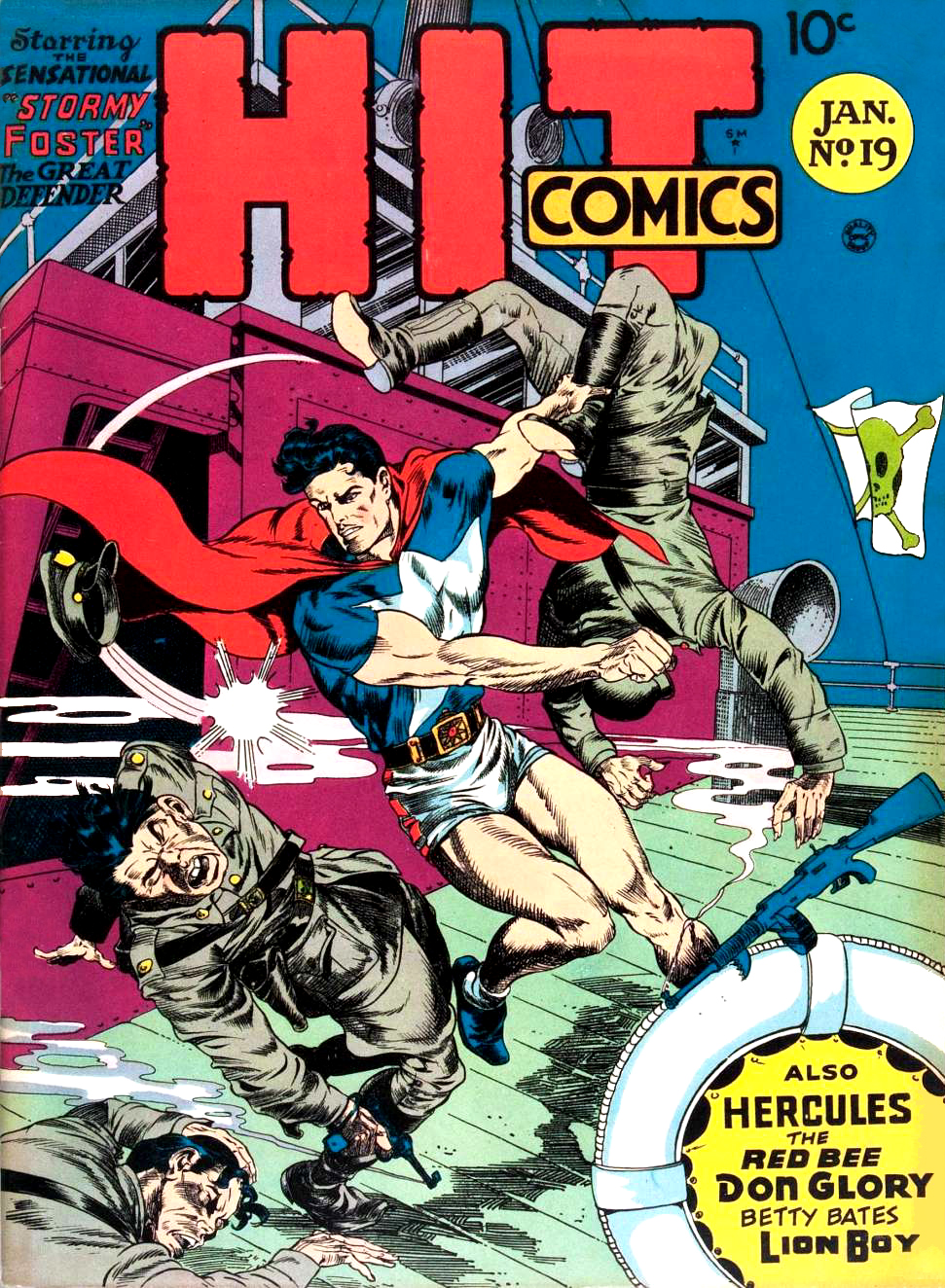
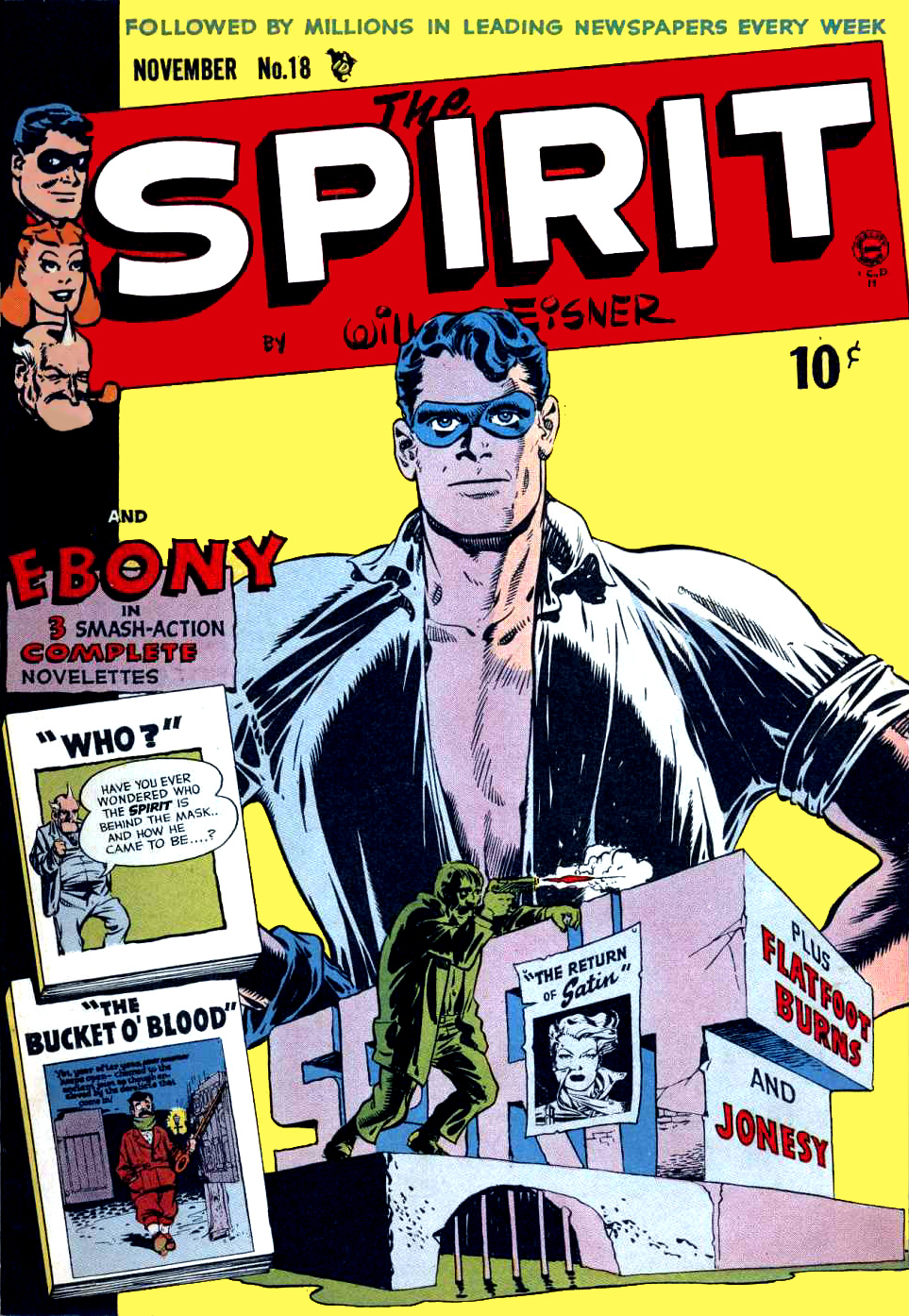
Quality characters and titles.
- All Humor Comics #1–17 (1946–1949)
- The Barker #1–15 (1946–1949)
- Blackhawk #9–107 (1944–1956; formerly Uncle Sam Quarterly #1–8; Blackhawk #108–273 subsequently published by DC Comics, 1957–1983)
- Bride's Romance #1–23 (1953–1956)
- Broadway Romances #1–5 (1950)
- Buccaneers #19–27 (1950–1951; formerly Kid Eternity #1–18)
- Buster Bear #1–10 (1953–1955)
- Campus Loves #1–5 (1949–1950)
- Candy #1–64 (1947–1956)
- Crack Comics #1–62 (1940–1949; Crack Comics[Ashcan] #1)
- Crack Western #63–84 (1949–1953; formerly Crack Comics #1–62; Jonesy #85(1) 2-8)
- Diary Loves #2–31 (1949–1953; formerly Love Diary #1; G.I. Sweethearts #32-45 Girls in Love #46-57)
- Doll Man #1–47 (1941–1953)
- Egbert #1-20 (1946–1950)
- Exotic Romances #22–31 (1955–1956; formerly True War Romances #1–21)
- Exploits of Daniel Boone #1–6 (1955–1956)
- Feature Funnies #1–20 (1937–1939); Feature Comics #21-144 (1939–1950)
- Flaming Love #1–6 (1949–1950)
- Forbidden Love #1–4 (1950)
- Gabby #11; issue numbering restarts, #2–9 (1953–1954; formerly Ken Shannon #1-10)
- G.I. Combat #1–43 (1952–1956; #44-288 subsequently published by DC Comics, 1957–1987)
- G.I. Sweethearts #32–45 (1953–1955; formerly Diary Loves #2–31; #46 onward Girls in Love #46-57)
- Girls in Love #46–57 (1955–1956; formerly G.I. Sweethearts #32–45)
- Heart Throbs #1–46 (1949; #47–146 subsequently published by DC Comics, 1957–1972; retitled Love Stories, #147–152, 1972–1973)
- Hickory #1-6 (1949–1950)
- Hit Comics #1–65 (1940–1950)
- Hollywood Diary #1–5 (1949–1950)
- Hollywood Secrets #1–6 (1949–1950)
- Intrigue #1 (1955)
- Jonesy #85; issue numbering restarts, 2–8 (1953–1954; formerly Crack Western #1–84)
- Ken Shannon #1–10 (1951–1953; Gabby #11 onward)
- Kid Eternity #1–18 (1946–1949; Buccaneers #19 onward)
- Lady Luck #86–90 (1949–1950; formerly Smash Comics #1–85)
- Love Confessions #1–54 (1949–1956)
- Love Diary #1 (1949; Diary Loves #2 onward)
- Love Letters #1–51 (1949–1956)
- Love Scandals #1–5 (1950)
- Love Secrets #32–56 (1953–1956)
- Marmaduke Mouse #1–65 (1946–1956)
- Military Comics #1–43 (1941–1945; Modern Comics #44 onward)
- Modern Comics #44–102 (1945–1950; previously Military Comics #1–43)
- National Comics #1–75 (1940–1949)
- Plastic Man #1–64 (1943–1956)
- Police Comics #1–127 (1941–1953)
- Range Romances #1–5 (1949–1950)
- Robin Hood Tales #1–6 (1956; #7–14 subsequently published by DC Comics, 1957–1958)
- Secret Loves #1–6 (1949–1950)
- Smash Comics #1–85 (1939–1949; Lady Luck #86 onward)
- The Spirit #1–22 (1944–1950)
- T-Man #1–38 (1951–1956)
- Torchy 1–6 (1949–1950)
- True War Romances #1–21 (1952–1955; Exotic Romances #22 onward)
- Uncle Sam Quarterly #1–8 (1941–1943; Blackhawk #9 onward)
- Untamed Love #1–5 (1950)
- Web of Evil #1–21 (1952–1954)
- Wedding Bells #1–19 (1954–1956)
- Yanks in Battle #1–4 (1956)

== See also ==
- Everett M. "Busy" Arnold
- Eisner & Iger
- Infinite Crisis
