= National Comics (series) =

National Comics #1 (July 1940); cover art by Lou Fine.

National Comics was an anthology comic book series published by Quality Comics, from July 1940 until November 1949. It ran for 75 issues.

National Comics #1 introduced Will Eisner's Uncle Sam, a superhero version of the national personification of the United States. Other running features in the title included Wonder Boy, The Barker, and Quicksilver (later revamped by DC Comics as Max Mercury). In addition to Eisner, other comic artists and writers who contributed to National Comics included Jack Cole, Lou Fine, and Reed Crandall.

National Comics #18 (December 1941), which hit the stands in November 1941, notably depicted an "Oriental" attack on Pearl Harbor, a month before the actual Japanese attack on the U.S. naval base.

== Other uses ==
National Comics #1 (May 1999) was a one-shot comic published by DC Comics as part of the Justice Society Returns storyline.

=== The New 52 ===
National Comics was revived in 2012 as part of The New 52 relaunch. It focused on lesser-known characters, such as Eternity, Madame X, Rose and Thorn, and Looker.
