= 1941 in comics =

Notable events of 1941 in comics.

== Events and publications ==
- Stan Lee becomes editor-in-chief at Timely Comics.
- Adventures of Captain Marvel, a twelve-chapter film serial adapted from the popular Captain Marvel comic book character for Republic Pictures, debuts. It was the first film adaptation of a comic book superhero.

=== January ===
- January 9: In The Adventures of Tintin story The Crab With the Golden Claws, prepublished in the juvenile supplement of Le Soir, Tintin and Captain Haddock first meet.
- January 10: The first issue of the Turkish children's magazine Cemal Nadir ve Arkadaş is launched, by Cemal Nadir Güler. It nevertheless only lasted 17 weeks.
- Action Comics (1938 series) #32 - National Periodical Publications
- Adventure Comics (1938 series) #58 - National Periodical Publications
- All-American Comics (1939 series) #22 - National Periodical Publications
- Crack Comics (1940 series) #9 - Quality Comics
- Detective Comics (1937 series) #47 - National Periodical Publications
- Fantastic Comics (1939 series) #14 - Fox Feature Syndicate
- Flash Comics (1940 series) #13 - National Periodical Publications
- Hit Comics (1940 series) #7 - Quality Comics
- Human Torch Comics (1940 series) #3 – Timely Comics
- Marvel Mystery Comics (1939 series) #15 - Timely Comics
- Master Comics (1940 series) #10 - Fawcett Comics
- More Fun Comics (1936 series) #63 - National Periodical Publications
- Mystery Men Comics (1939 series) #18 - Fox Feature Syndicate
- Smash Comics (1939 series) #18 - Quality Comics
- Target Comics (1940 series) #12 - Novelty Press
- Weird Comics (1940 series) #10 - Fox Feature Syndicate
- Whiz Comics (1940 series) #12 - Fawcett Comics
- Wonderworld Comics #21 - Fox Feature Syndicate

=== February ===
- Action Comics (1938 series) #33 - National Allied Publications
- Adventure Comics (1938 series) #59 - National Allied Publications
- All-American Comics (1939 series) #23 - National Allied Publications
- Crack Comics (1940 series) #10 - Quality Comics
- Detective Comics (1937 series) #48 - National Allied Publications
- Fantastic Comics (1939 series) #15 - Fox Feature Syndicate
- Flash Comics (1940 series) #14 - National Allied Publications
- Green Mask (1940 series) #4 - Fox Feature Syndicate
- Hit Comics (1940 series) #8 - Quality Comics
- Marvel Mystery Comics (1939 series) #16 - Timely Comics
- Master Comics (1940 series) #11 - Fawcett Comics
- More Fun Comics (1936 series) #64 - National Allied Publications
- Mystery Men Comics (1939 series) #19 - Fox Feature Syndicate
- Samson (1940 series) #3 - Fox Feature Syndicate
- Smash Comics (1939 series) #19 - Quality Comics
- Superman (1939 series) #8 - National Allied Publications
- The Flame (1940 series) #4 - Fox Feature Syndicate
- Weird Comics (1940 series) #11 - Fox Feature Syndicate
- Whiz Comics (1940 series) #13 - Fawcett Comics
- Wonderworld Comics #22 - Fox Feature Syndicate

=== March ===
- March 16: Marten Toonder's Tom Poes makes its debut.
- Action Comics (1938 series) #34 - National Allied Publications
- Adventure Comics (1938 series) #60 - National Allied Publications
- All-American Comics (1939 series) #24 - National Allied Publications
- Better Comics (Maple Leaf) #1. In the first issue Vernon Miller's Iron Man makes his debut, the first Canadian superhero.
- Captain America Comics (1941 series) #1 - Timely Comics
- Crack Comics (1940 series) #11 - Quality Comics
- Detective Comics (1937 series) #49 - National Allied Publications
- Fantastic Comics (1939 series) #16 - Fox Feature Syndicate
- Flash Comics (1940 series) #15 - National Allied Publications
- Green Hornet Comics (1940 series) #2 - Helnit Publishing
- Hit Comics (1940 series) #9 - Quality Comics
- Marvel Mystery Comics (1939 series) #17 - Timely Comics
- Master Comics (1940 series) #12 - Fawcett Comics
- More Fun Comics (1936 series) #65 - National Allied Publications
- Mystery Men Comics (1939 series) #20 - Fox Feature Syndicate
- Mystic Comics (1940 series) #5 - Timely Comics
- Smash Comics (1939 series) #20 - Quality Comics
- Target Comics (1941 series) #1 - Novelty Press
- Weird Comics (1940 series) #12 - Fox Feature Syndicate
- Whiz Comics (1940 series) #14 - Fawcett Comics
- Whiz Comics (1940 series) #15 - Fawcett Comics
- Wonderworld Comics #23 - Fox Feature Syndicate

=== April ===
- April 14: First strip of Love trouble, by Floyd Gottfredson and Merrill De Maris. First and only appearance of the Mickey Mouse’s female cousin Madeleine, who temporarily replaces Minnie as girlfriend of the hero.
- Action Comics (1938 series) #35 - National Allied Publications
- Adventure Comics (1938 series) #61 - National Allied Publications. In this issue Gardner Fox and Jack Burnley's Starman debuts.
- All-American Comics (1939 series) #25 - National Allied Publications
- All-Star Comics (1940 series) #4 - National Allied Publications
- Batman (1940 series) #5 - National Allied Publications
- Blue Beetle (1939 series) #6 - Fox Feature Syndicate
- Captain America Comics (1941 series) #2 - Timely Comics
- Captain Marvel Adventures (1941 series) #1 - Fawcett Comics
- Crack Comics (1940 series) #12 - Quality Comics
- Daring Mystery Comics (1940 series) #7 - Timely Comics
- Detective Comics (1937 series) #50 - National Allied Publications
- Fantastic Comics (1939 series) #17 - Fox Feature Syndicate
- Flash Comics (1940 series) #16 - National Allied Publications
- Green Hornet Comics (1940 series) #3 - Helnit Publishing
- Hit Comics (1940 series) #10 - Quality Comics
- Human Torch Comics (1940 series) #4 - Timely Comics
- Marvel Mystery Comics (1939 series) #18 - Timely Comics
- Master Comics (1940 series) #13 - Fawcett Comics
- More Fun Comics (1936 series) #66 - National Allied Publications
- Mystery Men Comics (1939 series) #21 - Fox Feature Syndicate
- Samson (1940 series) #4 - Fox Feature Syndicate
- Smash Comics (1939 series) #21 - Quality Comics
- Sub-Mariner Comics (1941 series) #1 - Timely Comics
- Superman (1939 series) #9 - National Allied Publications
- Target Comics (1941 series) #2 - Novelty Press
- Weird Comics (1940 series) #13 - Fox Feature Syndicate
- Whiz Comics (1940 series) #16 - Fawcett Comics
- Wonderworld Comics #24 - Fox Feature Syndicate
- World's Best Comics (1941 series) #1 - National Allied Publications

=== May ===
- May 12: The first episode of R.B. Clark's Boofhead is published.
- Action Comics (1938 series) #36 - National Allied Publications
- Adventure Comics (1938 series) #62 - National Allied Publications
- All-American Comics (1939 series) #26 - National Allied Publications
- Big 3 (1940 series) #3 - Fox Feature Syndicate
- Captain America Comics (1941 series) #3 - Timely Comics
- Cat-Man Comics (1941 series) #1 - Helnit Publishing
- Detective Comics (1937 series) #51 - National Allied Publications
- Fantastic Comics (1939 series) #18 - Fox Feature Syndicate
- Flash Comics (1940 series) #17 - National Allied Publications
- Green Hornet Comics (1940 series) #4 - Helnit Publishing
- Hit Comics (1940 series) #11 - Quality Comics
- Marvel Mystery Comics (1939 series) #19 - Timely Comics
- Master Comics (1940 series) #14 - Fawcett Comics
- More Fun Comics (1936 series) #67 - National Allied Publications
- Mystery Men Comics (1939 series) #22 - Fox Feature Syndicate
- Smash Comics (1939 series) #22 - Quality Comics
- Target Comics (1941 series) #3 - Novelty Press
- Weird Comics (1940 series) #14 - Fox Feature Syndicate
- Whiz Comics (1940 series) #17 - Fawcett Comics
- Wonderworld Comics #25 - Fox Feature Syndicate

=== June ===
- Action Comics (1938 series) #37 - National Allied Publications
- Adventure Comics (1938 series) #63 - National Allied Publications
- All-American Comics (1939 series) #27 - National Allied Publications
- All-Winners Comics (1941 series) #1 - Timely Comics
- Blue Beetle (1939 series) #7 - Fox Feature Syndicate
- Captain America Comics (1941 series) #4 - Timely Comics
- Cat-Man Comics (1941 series) #2 - Helnit Publishing
- Crack Comics (1940 series) #13 - Quality Comics
- Detective Comics (1937 series) #52 - National Allied Publications
- Fantastic Comics (1939 series) #19 - Fox Feature Syndicate
- Flash Comics (1940 series) #18 - National Allied Publications
- Green Hornet Comics (1940 series) #5 - Helnit Publishing
- Green Mask (1940 series) #5 - Fox Feature Syndicate
- Hit Comics (1940 series) #12 - Quality Comics
- Human Torch Comics (1940 series) #5 - Timely Comics
- Marvel Mystery Comics (1939 series) #20 - Timely Comics
- Master Comics (1940 series) #15 - Fawcett Comics
- More Fun Comics (1936 series) #68 - National Allied Publications
- Mystery Men Comics (1939 series) #23 - Fox Feature Syndicate
- Smash Comics (1939 series) #23 - Quality Comics
- Sub-Mariner Comics (1941 series) #2 - Timely Comics
- Superman (1939 series) #10 - National Allied Publications
- Target Comics (1941 series) #4 - Novelty Press
- The Flame (1940 series) #5 - Fox Feature Syndicate
- Weird Comics (1940 series) #15 - Fox Feature Syndicate
- Whiz Comics (1940 series) #18 - Fawcett Comics
- Wonderworld Comics #26 - Fox Feature Syndicate
- Young Allies Comics (1941 series) #1 - Timely Comics

=== July ===
- July 12: In Marten Toonder's Tom Poes story In De Tovertuin Olivier B. Bommel makes his debut.
- Action Comics (1938 series) #38 - National Allied Publications
- Adventure Comics (1938 series) #64 - National Allied Publications
- All-American Comics (1939 series) #28 - National Allied Publications
- All-Flash Comics (1941 series) #1 - National Allied Publications
- All-Star Comics (1940 series) #5 - National Allied Publications
- Big 3 (1940 series) #4 - Fox Feature Syndicate
- Bulletman (1941 series) #1 - Fawcett Comics
- Captain Marvel Adventures (1941 series) #2 - Fawcett Comics
- Cat-Man Comics (1941 series) #3 - Helnit Publishing
- Crack Comics (1940 series) #14 - Quality Comics
- Detective Comics (1937 series) #53 - National Allied Publications
- Fantastic Comics (1939 series) #20 - Fox Feature Syndicate
- Flash Comics (1940 series) #19 - National Allied Publications
- Hit Comics (1940 series) #13 - Quality Comics
- Marvel Mystery Comics (1939 series) #21 - Timely Comics
- Master Comics (1940 series) #16 - Fawcett Comics
- More Fun Comics (1936 series) #69 - National Allied Publications
- Mystery Men Comics (1939 series) #24 - Fox Feature Syndicate
- Samson (1940 series) #5 - Fox Feature Syndicate
- Smash Comics (1939 series) #24 - Quality Comics
- Target Comics (1941 series) #5 - Novelty Press
- The Eagle (1941 series) #1 - Fox Feature Syndicate
- Weird Comics (1940 series) #16 - Fox Feature Syndicate
- Whiz Comics (1940 series) #19 - Fawcett Comics
- Wonderworld Comics #27 - Fox Feature Syndicate
- World's Finest Comics (1941 series) #2 - National Allied Publications - Changed from "World's Best Comics"
- Wow Comics (1940 series) #2 - Fawcett Comics

=== August ===
- August 14: Marten Toonder's Tom Poes story De Geheimzinnige Roverhoofdman is first published. Halfway the story Tom Poes' home town Rommeldam makes its debut, as do the recurring characters Bulle Bas and Brigadier Snuf.
- Action Comics (1938 series) #39 - National Allied Publications
- Adventure Comics (1938 series) #65 - National Allied Publications
- All-American Comics (1939 series) #29 - National Allied Publications
- Blue Beetle (1939 series) #8 - Fox Feature Syndicate
- Captain America Comics (1941 series) #5 - Timely Comics
- Captain Fearless Comics (1941 series) #1 - Helnit Publishing
- Crack Comics (1940 series) #15 - Quality Comics
- Detective Comics (1937 series) #54 - National Allied Publications
- Fantastic Comics (1939 series) #21 - Fox Feature Syndicate
- Flash Comics (1940 series) #20 - National Allied Publications
- Green Hornet Comics (1940 series) #6 - Helnit Publishing, Final Issue
- Green Mask (1940 series) #6 - Fox Feature Syndicate
- Hit Comics (1940 series) #14 - Quality Comics
- Marvel Mystery Comics (1939 series) #22 - Timely Comics
- Master Comics (1940 series) #17 - Fawcett Comics
- Military Comics (1941 series) #1 - Quality Comics - It marks the debut of Will Eisner and Bob Powell's Blackhawk.
- More Fun Comics (1936 series) #70 - National Allied Publications
- Mystery Men Comics (1939 series) #25 - Fox Feature Syndicate
- Police Comics (1941 series) #1 - Quality Comics - This marks the debut of Jack Cole's Plastic Man.
- Smash Comics (1939 series) #25 - Quality Comics
- Superman (1939 series) #11 - National Allied Publications
- Target Comics (1941 series) #6 - Novelty Press
- The Flame (1940 series) #6 - Fox Feature Syndicate
- U.S.A. Comics (1941 series) #1 - Timely Comics
- Weird Comics (1940 series) #17 - Fox Feature Syndicate
- Whiz Comics (1940 series) #20 - Fawcett Comics
- Wonderworld Comics #28 - Fox Feature Syndicate

=== September ===
- September 16: Marten Toonder's Tom Poes story De Drakenburcht is first published. Halfway the story Olivier B. Bommel's castle Bommelstein and his car, De Oude Schicht, make their debut.
- September 23: The Belgian children's comics magazine Le Soir-Jeunesse, a supplement of the Nazi-controlled newspaper Le Soir, disappears after hardly a year of publication. The Adventures of Tintin, which was published in its pages since 1940, moves within Le Soir itself.
- Action Comics (1938 series) #40 - National Allied Publications
- Adventure Comics (1938 series) #66 - National Allied Publications
- All-American Comics (1939 series) #30 - National Allied Publications
- All-Flash Comics (1941 series) #2 - National Allied Publications
- All-Star Comics (1940 series) #6 - National Allied Publications
- All-Winners Comics (1941 series) #2 - Timely Comics
- Batman (1940 series) #6 - National Allied Publications
- Big 3 (1940 series) #5 - Fox Feature Syndicate
- Bulletman (1941 series) #2 - Fawcett Comics
- Captain America Comics (1941 series) #6 - Timely Comics
- Captain Fearless Comics (1941 series) #2 - Helnit Publishing, Final Issue
- Captain Marvel Adventures (1941 series) #3 - Fawcett Comics
- Cat-Man Comics (1941 series) #4 - Helnit Publishing
- Crack Comics (1940 series) #16 - Quality Comics
- Detective Comics (1937 series) #55 - National Allied Publications
- Doll Man (1941 series) #1 - Quality Comics
- Fantastic Comics (1939 series) #22 - Fox Feature Syndicate
- Flash Comics (1940 series) #21 - National Allied Publications
- Green Lantern (comic book) (1941 series) #1 - National Allied Publications. This marks the debut of Bill Finger and Martin Nodell's Green Lantern.
- Hit Comics (1940 series) #15 - Quality Comics
- Human Torch Comics (1940 series) #5 - Timely Comics - This is #5b. Human Torch has its own numbering now.
- Marvel Mystery Comics (1939 series) #23 - Timely Comics
- Master Comics (1940 series) #18 - Fawcett Comics
- Military Comics (1941 series) #2 - Quality Comics
- Minute-Man (1941 series) #1 - Fawcett Comics
- More Fun Comics (1936 series) #71 - National Allied Publications
- Mystery Men Comics (1939 series) #26 - Fox Feature Syndicate
- Police Comics (1941 series) #2 - Quality Comics
- Samson (1940 series) #6 - Fox Feature Syndicate, Final Issue
- Smash Comics (1939 series) #26 - Quality Comics
- Spy Smasher (1941 series) #1 - Fawcett Comics
- Sub-Mariner Comics (1941 series) #3 - Timely Comics
- Target Comics (1941 series) #7 - Novelty Press
- The Eagle (1941 series) #2 - Fox Feature Syndicate
- Uncle Sam Quarterly (1941 series) #1 - Quality Comics
- Weird Comics (1940 series) #18 - Fox Feature Syndicate
- Whiz Comics (1940 series) #21 - Fawcett Comics
- Wonderworld Comics #29 - Fox Feature Syndicate
- World's Finest Comics (1941 series) #3 - National Allied Publications
- Wow Comics (1940 series) #3 - Fawcett Comics

=== October ===
- October 18: Marten Toonder's Tom Poes story Het Verdwijneiland is first published. Halfway the story the characters Wal Rus and professor Joachim Sickbock make their debut.
- October 23: On Nazi orders two Dutch comics magazines, namely De Humorist and Sjors, are banned from publication. Sjors will nevertheless still be published but within the pages of the magazine Panorama until it finally vanishes in March 1942 and won't return until after the war in June 1947.
- Specific date in October unknown: The first gag of Ronald Searle's St. Trinians is printed in the magazine Liliput. Since Searle is drafted, it will only become a genuine series after his return from the war, in 1946.
- Action Comics (1938 series) #41 - National Allied Publications
- Adventure Comics (1938 series) #67 - National Allied Publications
- All-American Comics (1939 series) #31 - National Allied Publications
- Blue Beetle (1939 series) #9 - Fox Feature Syndicate
- Captain America Comics (1941 series) #7 - Timely Comics
- Captain Marvel Adventures (1941 series) #4 - Fawcett Comics
- Crack Comics (1940 series) #17 - Quality Comics
- Detective Comics (1937 series) #56 - National Allied Publications
- Flash Comics (1940 series) #22 - National Allied Publications
- Green Mask (1940 series) #7 - Fox Feature Syndicate
- Hit Comics (1940 series) #16 - Quality Comics
- Marvel Mystery Comics (1939 series) #24 - Timely Comics
- Master Comics (1940 series) #19 - Fawcett Comics
- Military Comics (1941 series) #3 - Quality Comics
- More Fun Comics (1936 series) #72 - National Allied Publications
- Mystery Men Comics (1939 series) #27 - Fox Feature Syndicate
- Mystic Comics (1940 series) #6 - Timely Comics
- Police Comics (1941 series) #3 - Quality Comics
- Smash Comics (1939 series) #27 - Quality Comics
- Star Spangled Comics (1941 series) #1 - National Allied Publications
- Superman (1939 series) #12 - National Allied Publications
- Target Comics (1941 series) #8 - Novelty Press
- The Flame (1940 series) #7 - Fox Feature Syndicate
- Whiz Comics (1940 series) #22 - Fawcett Comics
- Whiz Comics (1940 series) #23 - Fawcett Comics
- Wonderworld Comics #30 - Fox Feature Syndicate

=== November ===
- November 24: Gus Arriola's Gordo makes its debut.
- Action Comics (1938 series) #42 - National Allied Publications
- Adventure Comics (1938 series) #68 - National Allied Publications
- Air Fighters Comics (1941 series) #1 - Hillman Periodicals
- All-American Comics (1939 series) #32 - National Allied Publications
- All-Flash Comics (1941 series) #3 - National Allied Publications
- All-Star Comics (1940 series) #7 - National Allied Publications
- Batman (1940 series) #7 - National Allied Publications
- Big 3 (1940 series) #6 - Fox Feature Syndicate
- Captain America Comics (1941 series) #8 - Timely Comics
- Crack Comics (1940 series) #18 - Quality Comics
- Detective Comics (1937 series) #57 - National Allied Publications
- Fantastic Comics (1939 series) #23 - Fox Feature Syndicate, Final Issue
- Flash Comics (1940 series) #23 - National Allied Publications
- Hit Comics (1940 series) #17 - Quality Comics
- Green Lantern (comic book) (1941 series) #2 - National Allied Publications
- Human Torch Comics (1940 series) #6 - Timely Comics
- Leading Comics (1941 series) #1 - National Allied Publications
- Marvel Mystery Comics (1939 series) #25 - Timely Comics
- Master Comics (1940 series) #20 - Fawcett Comics
- Military Comics (1941 series) #4 - Quality Comics
- Minute-Man (1941 series) #2 - Fawcett Comics
- More Fun Comics (1936 series) #73 - National Allied Publications: This issue marks the debut of Paul Norris and Mort Weisinger's Aquaman as well as Green Arrow and Speedy.
- Mystery Men Comics (1939 series) #28 - Fox Feature Syndicate
- Police Comics (1941 series) #4 - Quality Comics
- Smash Comics (1939 series) #28 - Quality Comics
- Spy Smasher (1941 series) #2 - Fawcett Comics
- Star Spangled Comics (1941 series) #2 - National Allied Publications
- Sub-Mariner Comics (1941 series) #4 - Timely Comics
- Target Comics (1941 series) #9 - Novelty Press
- The Eagle (1941 series) #3 - Fox Feature Syndicate
- Uncle Sam Quarterly (1941 series) #2 - Quality Comics
- U.S.A. Comics (1941 series) #2 - Timely Comics
- U.S. Jones (1941 series) #1 - Fox Feature Syndicate
- Weird Comics (1940 series) #19 - Fox Feature Syndicate
- Whiz Comics (1940 series) #24 - Fawcett Comics
- Wonderworld Comics #31 - Fox Feature Syndicate
- World's Finest Comics (1941 series) #4 - National Allied Publications
- Wow Comics (1940 series) #4 - Fawcett Comics
- Xmas Comics (1941 series) #1 - Fawcett Comics
- Young Allies Comics (1941 series) #2 - Timely Comics

=== December ===
- The couple Betsy and Stanley Baer launch their own comic strip The Toodles, drawn by Rod Ruth, which debuts in The Chicago Sun. It will run until 1965.
- Action Comics (1938 series) #43 - National Allied Publications
- Adventure Comics (1938 series) #69 - National Allied Publications
- All-American Comics (1939 series) #33 - National Allied Publications
- All-Winners Comics (1941 series) #3 - Timely Comics
- America's Greatest Comics (1941 series) #1 - Fawcett Comics
- Blue Beetle (1939 series) #10 - Fox Feature Syndicate
- Captain Aero Comics (1941 series) - Helnit Publishing
- Captain America Comics (1941 series) #9 - Timely Comics
- Captain Marvel Adventures (1941 series) #5 - Fawcett Comics
- Cat-Man Comics (1941 series) #5 - Helnit Publishing
- Crack Comics (1940 series) #19 - Quality Comics
- Detective Comics (1937 series) #58 - National Allied Publications: First appearance of Batman villain The Penguin.
- Flash Comics (1940 series) #24 - National Allied Publications
- Gene Autry Comics (1941 series) #1 - Fawcett Comics
- Green Mask (1940 series) #8 - Fox Feature Syndicate
- Hit Comics (1940 series) #18 - Quality Comics
- Marvel Mystery Comics (1939 series) #26 - Timely Comics
- Master Comics (1940 series) #21 - Fawcett Comics
- Military Comics (1941 series) #5 - Quality Comics
- More Fun Comics (1936 series) #74 - National Allied Publications
- Mystery Men Comics (1939 series) #29 - Fox Feature Syndicate
- Mystic Comics (1940 series) #7 - Timely Comics
- Pep Comics #22 - marks the debut of Bob Montana's Archie Comics, who will receive their own title a year later.
- Police Comics (1941 series) #5 - Quality Comics
- Smash Comics (1939 series) #29 - Quality Comics
- Star Spangled Comics (1941 series) #3 - National Allied Publications
- Superman (1939 series) #13 - National Allied Publications
- Target Comics (1941 series) #10 - Novelty Press
- Whiz Comics (1940 series) #25 - Fawcett Comics
- Wonderworld Comics #32 - Fox Feature Syndicate
- Wow Comics (1940 series) #4 - Fawcett Comics

=== Specific date unknown ===
- In Norway, Jostein Øvrelid and Hallvard Sandnes start the long-running science fiction series Ingeniør Knut Berg på eventyr. It will run until 1960.
- Mutt and Jeff (1938 series) #3 - National Allied Publications.
- Roberto Sgrilli's Formichino ends.

== Births ==
=== April ===
- April 24: Gomaa Frahat, Egyptian political cartoonist, (d. 2021).

=== June ===
- June 2: Charlie Watts, British rock drummer (The Rolling Stones) (made comic strips for his band's U.S. tour program and the back sleeve of their album Between the Buttons), (d. 2021).
- June 15: Neal Adams, American comic book artist (Batman, Superman vs. Muhammad Ali, Green Lantern), (d. 2022).

=== July ===
- July 13: Tom Palmer, American comic artist and inker (Marvel Comics), (d. 2022).
- July 25: S. Clay Wilson, American underground comix artist (The Checkered Demon, Captain Pissgums and His Pervert Pirates), (d. 2021).

=== September ===
- September 26: Tom Veitch, American comic book writer (The Light and Darkness War, Animal Man, Star Wars), (d. 2022).

=== October ===
- October 20: Leopold Lippens, Belgian politician (namesake of the Leopold Lippens Prize at the Comics Festival of Knokke-Heist), (d. 2021).

=== November ===
- November 25: Philippe Honoré, French cartoonist (Charlie Hebdo), (d. 2015)

== Deaths ==
=== January ===
- January 4: George Roller, British illustrator and comics artist, dies at age 84.
- Specific date in January unknown: Jaime Tomás, Spanish comics artist, dies at age 31 or 32.

=== February ===
- February 13: J.B. Lowitz, American comics artist (The Captain Kiddis Kids, Swifty and his Wonderful Dream), dies at age 57.

=== August ===
- August 13: John Stuart Blackton, British animator and film director (The Enchanted Drawing, Humorous Phases of Funny Faces), dies at age 66.
- August 19: Caumery, French comics writer (Bécassine), dies at age 64.

=== October ===
- October 8: Win Smith, Canadian-American animator and comics artist (Penguin Pete, Looney Luke, continued Mickey Mouse, worked on Looney Tunes comics), dies at age 53.
- October 14: Leoncio Martínez, aka Leo, Venezuelan journalist, playwright, illustrator, caricaturist and comics artist, dies at age 52.
- October 22: Louis Markous, Ludwig Markous and/or Louis Marcoussis, French illustrator, painter and comics artist, dies at age 63.

=== November ===
- November 26: Patrick Kroon, Dutch caricaturist, painter, illustrator and comics artist, dies at age 69.

=== December ===
- December 4: Axel Bäckman, Swedish comics artist (Påhittiga Johansson, Rulle Rustibus), dies at age 73.
- December 21: Arthur Racey, Canadian illustrator, caricaturist, advertising and comics artist (An Englishman in Canada), dies at age 70 or 71.
- December 31: Sol Hess, American comics writer (The Nebbs), dies at age 59.

== First issues by title ==
- All-Flash (Summer, National Comics)
- All Winners Comics (Summer, Timely Comics)
- Air Fighters Comics (November, Hillman Periodicals)
- Captain Aero Comics (December, Helnit Publishing)
- Captain America Comics (March, Timely Comics)
- Captain Fearless Comics (August, Helnit Publishing)
- Captain Marvel Adventures (March, Fawcett Comics)
- Cat-Man Comics (May, Helnit Publishing)
- Classics Illustrated (Gilberton)
- Gene Autry Comics (Fawcett Comics)
- Green Lantern (Fall, National Comics)
- Leading Comics (Winter, National Comics)
- Police Comics (August, Quality Comics)
- Spy Smasher (September, Fawcett Comics)
- Star-Spangled Comics (October, DC Comics)
- Sub-Mariner Comics (Fall, Timely Comics)
- The Eagle (July, Fox Feature Syndicate)
- U.S. Jones (November, Fox Feature Syndicate)
- World's Finest Comics (Spring, DC Comics)
- Xmas Comics (November, Fawcett Comics)
- Young Allies (Marvel Comics) (Summer, Timely Comics)

== Initial appearances by character name ==
- Anita Diminuta, created by Jesús Blasco, in Mis Chicas
- Aquaman, created by Mort Weisinger and Paul Norris, in More Fun Comics #73 (November), published by DC Comics
- Archie Andrews, created by Bob Montana, in Pep Comics #22, published by MLJ Magazines
- Beast-Ruler, created by George Tuska, in Captain Marvel Adventures #3 (September), published by Fawcett Comics
- Blackhawk, created by Chuck Cuidera with input from both Bob Powell and Will Eisner, in Military Comics #1 (August), published by Quality Comics
- Bucky Barnes, created by Joe Simon and Jack Kirby, in Captain America Comics #1 (March), published by Timely Comics
- Captain America, created by Joe Simon and Jack Kirby, in Captain America Comics #1 (March), published by Timely Comics
- Captain Marvel Jr., created by France Herron and Mac Raboy, in Whiz Comics #25 (December), published by Fawcett Comics
- Captain Nazi, created by C. C. Beck and Bill Parker, in Master Comics #21 (December), published by Fawcett Comics
- Cat-Man, created by Irwin Hason, in Cat-Man #1 (May), published by Helnit Publishing
- Doctor Mid-Nite, created by Charles Reizenstein and Stanley Aschmeier, in All-American Comics #25 (April), published by DC Comics
- Dummy, created by Mort Weisinger and Mort Meskin, in Leading Comics #1 (December), published by DC Comics
- Firebrand, created by S. M. Iger and Reed Crandall, in Police Comics #1 (August), published by Quality Comics
- Green Arrow, created by Mort Weisinger and George Papp, in More Fun Comics #73, published by DC Comics
- Human Bomb, created by Paul Gustavson, in Police Comics #1 (August), published by Quality Comics
- Ian Karkull, created by Gardner Fox and Howard Sherman, in More Fun Comics #69 (August), published by DC Comics
- Jester, created by Paul Gustavson, in Smash Comics #22 (May), published by Quality Comics
- Johnny Quick, created by Mort Weisinger, in More Fun Comics #71 (September), published by DC Comics
- Midnight created by Jack Cole, in Smash Comics #18 (January). published by Quality Comics
- Minute-Man, created by Charlie Sultan, in Master Comics #11 (February), published by Fawcett Comics
- Miss America, created by Elmer Wexler, in Military Comics #1 (August), published by Quality Comics
- Nabu, created by Gardner Fox and Howard Sherman, in More Fun Comics #67 (May), published by DC Comics
- Nelvana of the Northern Lights, created by Adrian Dingle, in Triumph-Adventure Comics #1 (August), published by Hillborough Studios
- Pat Dugan (Stripesy), created by Jerry Siegel, in Action Comics #40 (September), published by DC Comics
- Paul Kirk / Manhunter, in Adventure Comics #58 (January), published by National Allied Publications
- Penguin, created by Bill Finger and Bob Kane, in Detective Comics #58, published by National Allied Publications
- Phantom Lady, created by Arthur Peddy, in Police Comics #1 (August), published by Quality Comics
- Plastic Man, created by Jack Cole, in Police Comics #1, published by Quality Comics
- Queen Bee, created by Ken Fitch and Bernard Baily, in Action Comics #42 (November), published by DC Comics
- Red Skull, created by Joe Simon and Jack Kirby, in Captain America Comic #7 (October), published by Timely Comics
- Sandy Hawkins, created by Mort Weisinger and Paul Norris, in Adventure Comics #69 (December), published by National Allied Publications
- Sargon the Sorcerer, created by Steve Niles and Scott Hampton, in All-American Comics #26 (May), published by DC Comics
- Scarecrow, created by Bill Finger and Bob Kane, in World's Finest Comics #3 (September), published by DC Comics
- Seven Soldiers of Victory, created by Mort Weisinger and Mort Meskin, in Leading Comics #1, published by National Allied Publications
- Shade, created by Mort Weisinger and Mort Meskin, in Action Comics #43 (December), published by DC Comics
- Shining Knight, created by Creig Flessel, in Adventure Comics #66 (September), published by DC Comics
- Speedy, created by Mort Weisinger and Paul Norris, in More Fun Comics #73 (November), published by National Allied Publications
- Starman, created by Jack Burnley, in Adventure Comics #61 (April), published by DC Comics
- Star-Spangled Kid, created by Jerry Siegel, in Action Comics #40 (September), published by DC Comics
- Tarantula, created by Mort Weisinger, in Star-Spangled Comics #1 (October), published by National Allied Publications
- Vigilante, created by Mort Weisinger and Mort Meskin, in Action Comics #42 (November), published by National Allied Publications
- Wildfire, created by Robert Turner and Jim Mooney, in Smash Comics #25, published by Quality Comics
