= List of Freedom Fighters members =

The Freedom Fighters is a team of comic book superheroes, as published by DC Comics.

The roster of the team has changed a great deal over the years. These roster lists are of the members during the team's various incarnations by team iteration.

The codenames listed under Character are those used during the time frame of the particular iteration. Characters with more than one codename for that period have them listed chronologically and separated by a slash (/). Bolded names in the most recent iteration published are the current team members.

First Appearance is the place where the character first appeared as a member of a particular iteration. It is not necessarily the first appearance of the character in print, nor the story depicting how the character joined the team.

All information is listed in publication order first, then alphabetical.

== First roster ==
This roster covers the iteration of the team introduced in the early 1970s and later modified by retcons in the 1980s.

Character	Real name	First appearance	Notes
Black Condor	Richard Grey, Jr.	Justice League of America #107 (September/October 1973)	Former member of the All-Star Squadron.
Doll Man	Darrell Dane	Justice League of America #107 (September/October 1973)	Former member of the All-Star Squadron.
Human Bomb	Roy Lincoln	Justice League of America #107 (September/October 1973)	Former member of the All-Star Squadron.
Phantom Lady	Sandra Knight	Justice League of America #107 (September/October 1973)	Former member of the All-Star Squadron.
The Ray	Langford "Happy" Terrill	Justice League of America #107 (September/October 1973)	Former member of the All-Star Squadron.
Uncle Sam	N/A	Justice League of America #107 (September/October 1973)	Founding member
Firebrand	Rod Reilly	Freedom Fighters #12 (January/February 1978)	
Hourman	Rex Tyler	All-Star Squadron #31 (March 1984)	Founding member due to retcon.; Former and later member of: All-Star Squadron; Justice Society of America
Invisible Hood	Kent Thurston	All-Star Squadron #31 (March 1984)	Founding member due to retcon.; Apparent death in All-Star Squadron #31 (March 1984)
Magno	Tom Dalton	All-Star Squadron #31 (March 1984)	Founding member due to retcon.; Apparent death in All-Star Squadron #31 (March 1984)
Miss America	Joan Dale	All-Star Squadron #31 (March 1984)	Later member of: All-Star Squadron; Justice Society of America
Neon the Unknown	Tom Corbet	All-Star Squadron #31 (March 1984)	Founding member due to retcon.; Apparent death in All-Star Squadron #31 (March 1984).; Revealed to have survived Freedom Fighters (2008).
Red Torpedo	Jim Lockhart	All-Star Squadron #31 (March 1984)	Founding member due to retcon.; Apparent death in All-Star Squadron #31 (March 1984).; Revealed to have survived in Starman (vol. 2) #77 (May 2001).
The Red Bee	Rick Raleigh	All-Star Squadron #33 (May 1984)	Apparent death in All-Star Squadron #35 (July 1984).
Alias the Spider	Thomas Hallaway / Thomas Ludlow	All-Star Squadron #50 (October 1985)	Former member of the All-Star Squadron.; Later member of the Seven Soldiers of Victory.; Apparent death in The Shade #3 (June 1997).
Blackhawks	N/A	All-Star Squadron #50 (October 1985)	
Jester	Chuck Lane	All-Star Squadron #50 (October 1985)	Former member of the All-Star Squadron.
Manhunter	Dan Richards	All-Star Squadron #50 (October 1985)	Former member of the All-Star Squadron.
Quicksilver	Max Crandall	All-Star Squadron #50 (October 1985)	Former member of the All-Star Squadron.
Plastic Man	Patrick "Eel" O'Brian	All-Star Squadron #50 (October 1985)	Former member of the All-Star Squadron.; Later member of the Justice League of America.
The Red Bee	unknown / unclear	JSA #42 (January 2003)	It is not clear if this is a retcon or someone who took up the role of the deceased Red Bee.

== Second roster ==
This roster covers the iteration of the team introduced in 2001.

Character	Real name	First appearance	Notes
Black Condor	Ryan Kendall	JSA: Our Worlds at War #1 (September 2001)	Former member of Primal Force.; Apparent death in Infinite Crisis #1 (October 2005).
Damage	Grant Emerson	JSA: Our Worlds at War #1 (September 2001)	Former member of: Titans; Young Justice; Later member of the Justice Society of America.
Human Bomb	Roy Lincoln	JSA: Our Worlds at War #1 (September 2001)	Apparent death in Infinite Crisis #1 (October 2005).
Iron Munro	Arn Munro	JSA: Our Worlds at War #1 (September 2001)	Former member of: Young All-Stars; All-Star Squadron
The Patriot / Uncle Sam	N/A	JSA: Our Worlds at War #1 (September 2001)	
Phantom Lady	Dee Tyler	JSA: Our Worlds at War #1 (September 2001)	Apparent death in Infinite Crisis #1 (October 2005).
The Ray	Ray Terrill	JSA: Our Worlds at War #1 (September 2001)	Former member of: Justice League Task Force; Justice League of America; The Titans; Young Justice; Forgotten Heroes

== Third roster ==
This roster covers the iteration of the team introduced in 2006 after Infinite Crisis.

Character	Real name	First appearance	Notes
**Firebrand**	Andre Twist	Uncle Sam and the Freedom Fighters #1 (September 2006)	
**Uncle Sam**	N/A	Uncle Sam and the Freedom Fighters #1 (September 2006)	Resurrected in Crisis Aftermath: The Battle for Blüdhaven #5
**Doll Man**	Lester Colt	Uncle Sam and the Freedom Fighters #2 (October 2006)	Former operative of S.H.A.D.E.; Seemingly retires to have a civilian life and start a family; continues to aide the Freedom Fighters in the Heartland.
**Human Bomb**	Andy Franklin	Uncle Sam and the Freedom Fighters #2 (October 2006)	Former operative of S.H.A.D.E.
**Phantom Lady**	Stormy Knight	Uncle Sam and the Freedom Fighters #2 (October 2006)	Former operative of S.H.A.D.E.; Retired from being a superheroine to be an actress.
The Ray	Stan Silver	Uncle Sam and the Freedom Fighters #2 (October 2006)	Double-agent revealed as a traitor; operative of S.H.A.D.E.
**Black Condor**	John Trujillo	Uncle Sam and the Freedom Fighters #3 (November 2006)	
Red Bee	Jenna Raleigh	Uncle Sam and the Freedom Fighters #5 (January 2007)	Evolved into an alien bug/human hybrid and betrayed the Freedom Fighters whilst under the alien bug queen's mind control.; Left the Freedom Fighters after being cured by Neon the Unknown.
Invisible Hood	Ken Thurston	Uncle Sam and the Freedom Fighters #5 (January 2007)	Killed by Stan Silver in Uncle Sam and the Freedom Fighters #6.
**Miss America / Miss Cosmos**	Joan Dale	Uncle Sam and the Freedom Fighters #6 (February 2007)	Evolved into **Miss Cosmos** after her seemingly heroic sacrifice fighting an alien bug invasion.
**The Ray**	Ray Terrill	Uncle Sam and the Freedom Fighters #7 (March 2007)	
**Captain Triumph**	N/A	Uncle Sam and the Freedom Fighters v2 #4 (February 2008)	Former member of the Crusaders while under Director Robbins' mind control.
Citizen X	N/A	Uncle Sam and the Freedom Fighters v2 #4 (February 2008)	Former member of the Crusaders while under Director Robbins' mind control.; Killed by Red Bee after she evolved into an alien bug/human hybrid.
The Libertine	N/A	Uncle Sam and the Freedom Fighters v2 #4 (February 2008)	Former member of the Crusaders while under Director Robbins' mind control.; Died fighting the second alien bug invasion.
**Magno**	N/A	Uncle Sam and the Freedom Fighters v2 #4 (February 2008)	Former member of the Crusaders while under Director Robbins' mind control.
Neon the Unknown	Langford "Happy" Terrill	Uncle Sam and the Freedom Fighters v2 #6 (April 2008)	Became the second Neon the Unknown after Uncle Sam sent him to recruit the first one.; Left the Freedom Fighters to rebuild a relationship with his son, Ray.
