= Millennium Edition (DC Comics) =

Millennium Edition was the umbrella title of 62 (Note: Five issues (All Star Comics #3, Batman #1, Crisis on Infinite Earths #1, Justice League #1, and Superman #1) also had chromium cover variants.) one-shot comic books published by DC Comics in 2000 and 2001. It reprinted key issues from the history of the company such as the first appearance of notable characters, the relaunch of existing characters, or the start of major storylines. The oldest issue reprinted was Detective Comics #1 (March 1937) and the most recent was JLA #1 (January 1997). Each issue of Millennium Edition had a gold foil logo stamped onto the front cover and a brief essay on the inside covers detailing the significance of the issue reprinted.

== The issues ==
Title	Date	Notes
Action Comics #1	June 1938	First appearance of Superman
Action Comics #252	May 1959	First appearance of Supergirl
Adventure Comics #61	April 1941	First appearance of Starman (Ted Knight)
Adventure Comics #247	April 1958	First appearance of the Legion of Super-Heroes
All Star Comics #3	Winter 1940	First appearance of the Justice Society of America
All Star Comics #8	December 1941–January 1942	First appearance of Wonder Woman
All-Star Western #10	February–March 1972	First appearance of Jonah Hex
Batman #1	Spring 1940	Debut issue of series; first appearance of the Joker and the Catwoman
Batman: The Dark Knight Returns #1	March 1986	First issue of mini-series by Frank Miller
The Brave and the Bold #28	February–March 1960	First appearance of the Justice League of America
The Brave and the Bold #85	August–September 1969	Redesign of Green Arrow by Neal Adams
Crisis on Infinite Earths #1	April 1985	First issue of maxi-series by Marv Wolfman and George Pérez
Detective Comics #1	March 1937	Debut issue of series
Detective Comics #27	May 1939	First appearance of the Batman
Detective Comics #38	April 1940	First appearance of Robin (Dick Grayson)
Detective Comics #225	November 1955	First appearance of the Martian Manhunter
Detective Comics #327	May 1964	"New-look" for Batman by John Broome and Carmine Infantino
Detective Comics #359	January 1967	First appearance of Batgirl (Barbara Gordon)
Detective Comics #395	January 1970	First Batman story by Dennis O'Neil and Neal Adams
The Flash #123	September 1961	"Flash of Two Worlds" by Gardner Fox and Carmine Infantino
Flash Comics #1	January 1940	First appearance of the Golden Age Flash (Jay Garrick) and Hawkman
Gen^{13} #1	February 1994	First issue of mini-series
Green Lantern #76	April 1970	First Green Lantern/Green Arrow story by Dennis O'Neil and Neal Adams
Hellblazer #1	January 1988	Debut issue of series
House of Mystery #1	December 1951–January 1952	Debut issue of series
House of Secrets #92	June–July 1971	First appearance of the Swamp Thing by Len Wein and Bernie Wrightson
JLA #1	January 1997	1990s relaunch of the Justice League
Justice League #1	May 1987	1980s relaunch of the Justice League
Kingdom Come #1	May 1996	First issue of mini-series by Mark Waid and Alex Ross
Mad #1	October–November 1952	Debut issue of series
The Man of Steel #1	October 1986	1980s relaunch of Superman by John Byrne
Military Comics #1	August 1941	First appearance of Blackhawk
More Fun Comics #73	November 1941	First appearance of Aquaman and Green Arrow
More Fun Comics #101	January–February 1945	First appearance of Superboy
Mysterious Suspense #1	October 1968	One-shot featuring the Question by Steve Ditko
New Gods #1	February–March 1971	First appearance of the New Gods by Jack Kirby
New Teen Titans #1	November 1980	Debut issue of series by Marv Wolfman and George Pérez
Our Army at War #81	April 1959	First appearance of Sgt. Rock
Plop! #1	September–October 1973	Debut issue of series
Police Comics #1	August 1941	First appearance of Plastic Man
Preacher #1	April 1995	First appearance of Jesse Custer by Garth Ennis and Steve Dillon
Saga of the Swamp Thing #21	February 1984	"The Anatomy Lesson" by Alan Moore, Stephen R. Bissette, and John Totleben
The Sandman #1	January 1989	First appearance of Dream of the Endless by Neil Gaiman, Sam Kieth, and Mike Dringenberg
Sensation Comics #1	January 1942	Wonder Woman feature begins. First appearance of Mister Terrific and Wildcat
The Shadow #1	October–November 1973	The Shadow by Dennis O'Neil and Michael W. Kaluta
Showcase #4	October 1956	First appearance of the Silver Age Flash (Barry Allen)
Showcase #9	August 1957	Featuring Lois Lane
Showcase #22	September–October 1959	First appearance of the Silver Age Green Lantern (Hal Jordan)
Spirit #1	May 1944	The Spirit by Will Eisner
Superboy #1	March–April 1949	Debut issue of series
Superman #1	Summer 1939	Debut issue of series
Superman #76	July–August 1952	First team-up of Superman and Batman; regular team-ups began in World's Finest Comics #71
Superman #233	January 1971	1970s relaunch of Superman by Dennis O'Neil, Curt Swan, and Murphy Anderson; first chapter of the Sandman Saga
Superman vol. 2 #75	January 1993	"The Death of Superman" by Dan Jurgens
Superman's Pal Jimmy Olsen #1	September–October 1954	Debut issue of series
Watchmen #1	September 1986	Debut issue of maxi-series by Alan Moore and Dave Gibbons
Whiz Comics #2	February 1940	First appearance of Captain Marvel
WildC.A.T.S: Covert Action Teams #1	August 1992	First comic book published by Wildstorm Productions
Wonder Woman #1	Summer 1942	Debut issue of series
Wonder Woman vol. 2 #1	February 1987	1980s relaunch of Wonder Woman by Greg Potter and George Pérez; first chapter of the "Gods and Mortals" storyline.
World's Finest Comics #71	July–August 1954	Regular team-ups of Superman and Batman begin; first team-up was in Superman #76
Young Romance Comics #1	September–October 1947	Joe Simon and Jack Kirby create the romance comics genre

== See also ==
- List of DC Comics publications
