= Red Bee =

Red Bee can refer to:

- Ericsson Broadcast and Media Services — a United Kingdom based media management company, formerly known as Red Bee Media
  - Red Bee, a creative division of the above company that retains the brand
- Red Bee (character) — a Quality Comics superhero from the 1940s revived by DC Comics
