= Modern Comics =

Modern Comics may refer to:

- Modern Comics, an imprint of Charlton Comics
- Modern Comics, an imprint of Millennium Publications
- Military Comics (later Modern Comics), a comic book published by Quality Comics
- The Modern Age of Comic Books, comics published since the mid-1980s
