= Kid Eternity =

Fictional character

- The various incarnations of Christoper "Kit" Freeman as Kid Eternity. Art by Rafael Del Latorre. Colors by Luis Guerrero.

Publication information
- Publisher: Quality Comics; DC Comics
- First appearance: Chistopher Freeman; Hit Comics #25 (December 1942); Second version JSA (vol. 2) #3 (January 2025)
- Created by: Christopher Freeman; Otto Binder (writer); Sheldon Moldoff (artist); Second version Jeff Lemire (writer); Diego Olortegui (artist)

In-story information
- Full name: Christopher "Kit" Freeman (I); Unrevealed (second version)
- Species: Ghost
- Place of origin: Kit Freeman; England; New York City (current)
- Team affiliations: Lords of Chaos and Order
- Partnerships: Mister Keeper; Marvel Family
- Supporting character of: Shazam; Teen Titans
- Abilities: Divine empowerment grants Necromancy, Spirit Summoning, & Chronokinesis; Ghostly form grants Invisibility, Intangibility, & Flight; Self-sustenance; Dimension travel

Kid Eternity is the name of several superheroes published by originally Quality Comics and then DC Comics. The character debuted in Quality Comic's Hit Comics #25 (December, 1942), written by Otto Binder and drawn by Sheldon Moldoff. In the 1980s, Kid Eternity was folded into the Shazam! series. Kid Eternity was rebooted in 1991 by Grant Morrison with a new focus and backstory, appearing sporadically since then and became associated with the Teen Titans. A new, female version debuted in JSA (vol. 2) #3, written by Jeff Lemire and illustrated by Diego Olortegui.

The first version of Kid Eternity is Christopher "Kit" Freeman, a teenager whose death in the 1940s was considered too soon due a to a supernatural mishap. The supernatural entity Mr. Keeper rectified this by returning Kit to life as a superhero upholding good in the world while bestowing the power to summoning mythological or historical figures by saying "Eternity" and granting him ghost-like powers. Subjected to various revisions, the character, is retroactively connected as an agent of the Lords of Chaos. Following the New 52 reboot, he is instead a young coroner able to resurrect the dead. The second Kid Eternity is an unrevealed, teenage ghost girl whom happens upon Hawkman while the JSA battles the Injustice Society and helps the hero while learning of her origins. This version is alternatively an agent for the Lords of Order.

== Publication history ==
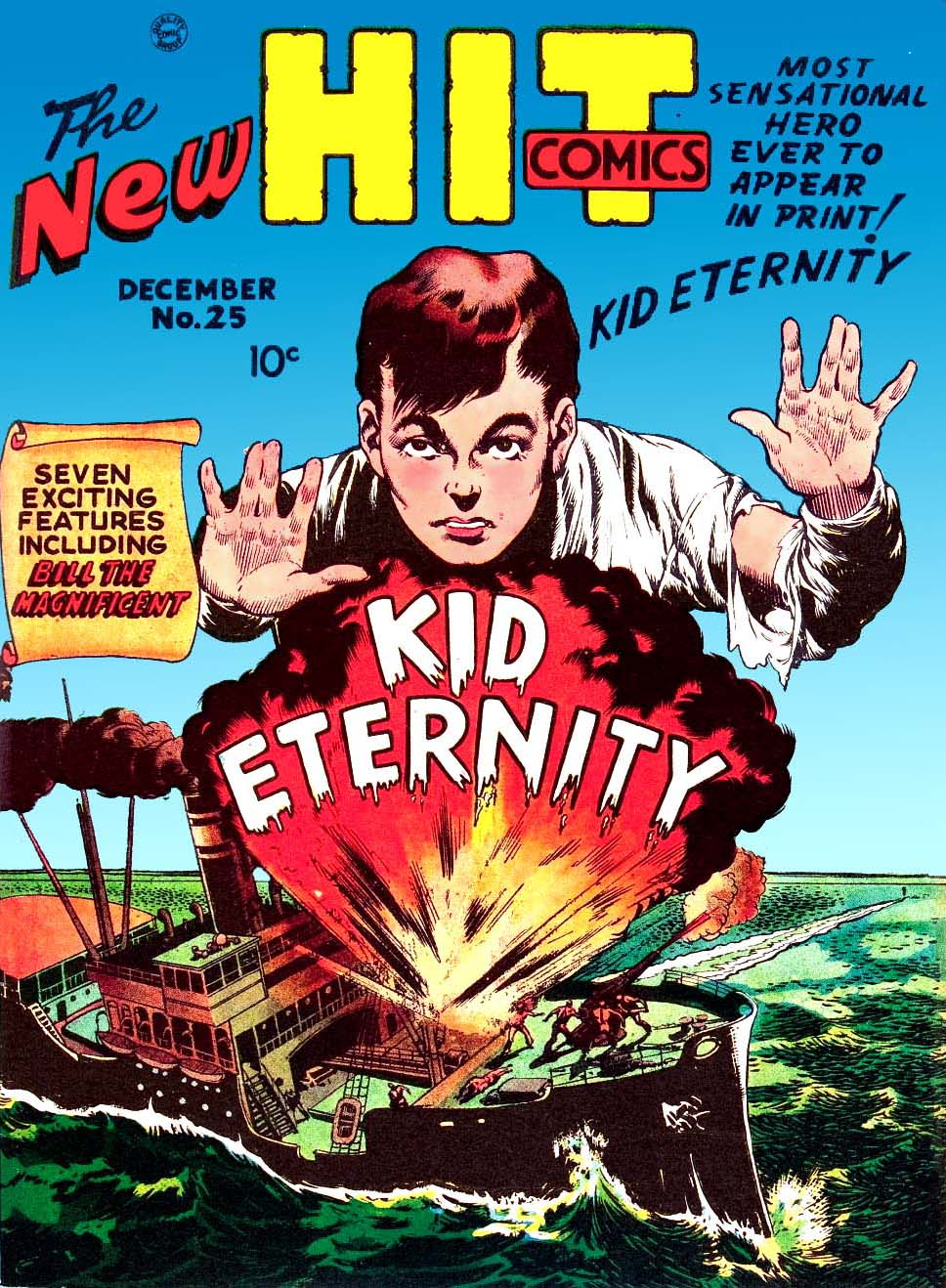
Kid Eternity's debut issue.

Prior to issue #25, Hit Comics had a series of rotating cover features, including Hercules, the Red Bee, Stormy Foster and Neon the Unknown. However, December 1942 saw the entire line-up of comics at Quality change their features (if not always the cover feature). Kid Eternity was brought in from the start as the new cover feature for Hit. The character may have been based on the 1941 film Here Comes Mr. Jordan, in which a prizefighter dies too soon in a plane crash and is given a new life by a celestial guide. Kid Eternity received a self-titled solo series in spring 1946. His antagonists, Her Highness and Silk were given their own strip in Hit Comics #29 through #57. By the late 1940s, however, Quality Comics was experiencing the post-war bust that most superhero comics were. In November 1949, Kid Eternity's self-titled magazine was discontinued and his lead slot in Hit Comics was given to Jeb Rivers, a riverboat captain.

In 1991, DC Comics' Vertigo line debuted a three-issue self-titled mini-series, written by Grant Morrison and illustrated by Duncan Fegredo, in which Kid Eternity must free Mr. Keeper from Hell. In 1993, a second volume began publication, written by Ann Nocenti and illustrated by Sean Phillips. It ran for sixteen issues.

== Fictional character biography ==
=== Christopher Freeman ===
==== Quality Comics ====
Kid Eternity was originally a nameless boy (who remembered being called only "Kid" by his "Gran'pa") who was killed when a U-boat sank his grandfather's fishing boat during World War II. Due to a supernatural mix-up however, he was killed 75 years too soon. To rectify the error, the Kid is brought back to life for another 75 years with the mission of upholding good in the world. He is given the power to summon any good historical or mythological figure or animal by saying the word "Eternity" as well as to use the same word to make himself intangible and invisible. Kid Eternity is assisted on his duties by the clerk who had made the error, Mr. Keeper. He is sometimes shown summoning fictional figures, like Jean Valjean or the Three Witches. According to Jess Nevins' Encyclopedia of Golden Age Superheroes, "with the help of people like Sir Launcelot, Merlin and Hercules, [Kid Eternity] fights against crime, evil, the Germans, the super-strong Mr. Puny, Master Man (Satan's personal servant, who can summon history's greatest villains), and Dr. Pain, the master of agony".

==== DC Comics ====
===== Earth-S background and history =====
Following DC's acquiring the character and later revived his title in the 1980s, the character was made a sibling of Captain Marvel Jr. (Freddy Freeman) with a similar background. Upon the death of their parents, both would be raised by their separate grandfathers. While Freddy lived with their paternal grandfather Jacob Freeman, Kitt is given to their maternal grandfather Daniel Troop, a merchant captain who's best friends with the ship's owner. A few years later, during World War II, Kit and Daniel are attacked by a German U-bot and their ship is sunk, killing them in the process. When their bodies were washed ashore, Daniel's cause of death is blood loss but Kit's death was notably unusual due to his healthy appearance. While Daniel is let into the afterlife, the Wizard Shazam prevents Kit and alerts Mister Keeper, who learns Freddy was originally fated to be killed and Kit was to live to be over 75. Unable to be sent back to the living, Mister Keeper instead empowers him as a superhero and occasionally, he assists the Marvel Family while keeping his brotherhood a secret from Freddy, a fact he eventually learns alongside the Marvel Family.

===== Post-Crisis on Infinite Earths =====
In post-Crisis continuity, Kid Eternity is a servant of the Lords of Chaos, who manipulated him into serving them. Furthermore, the entities he summons are demons who assume the form of the figures he desires. In JSA, Kid Eternity is killed by Mordru.

He returns in Teen Titans #31 (2006) having been used by Brother Blood to wedge open the doorway between life and death to which he was chained. This doorway appears as an actual doorway, with "life and death" written on it, as it is seen from Beast Boy's perspective and that was all his mind is able to comprehend. He returns and finally defeats Blood, who has been plaguing the Titans for some time using the souls of all the previous Brother Bloods, and is active once again.

In Teen Titans #74, Kid Eternity is kidnapped by the Calculator and forced to summon the spirit of Marvin White repeatedly. The Calculator some time later acknowledges Kid Eternity as "burned out", without explanation. Kid Eternity was beaten to death by the Calculator after he could not get the results he wanted from him.

=== The New 52 ===
In 2011, "The New 52" rebooted the DC universe. Kid Eternity is a police coroner who can resurrect the dead.

=== Second Kid Eternity ===
In the series JSA, there is a ghostly girl calling herself Kid Eternity. She encounters Hawkman in Hell after he is captured by Wotan and the Demons Three. She helps to free Hawkman and reunites him with Hawkgirl as they work to avoid the demons. Kid Eternity enters the afterlife and encounters Wildcat. She follows him into the afterlife, where Wildcat and fellow JSA members Atom, Doctor Fate (Kent Nelson), Doctor Mid-Nite, Hourman, and Sandman tell her that the JSA is in danger and that they need her help.

Mister Keeper explains to Kid Eternity that there were many people who went by the name of Kid Eternity and she is the most important incarnation right now. Kid Eternity does not know who she was prior to assuming the mantle and has brief memories of her mother. Mister Keeper states that he cannot give Kid Eternity answers until she fulfills her duties. Doctor Fate gives Kid Eternity the ability to harness the powers of the dead JSA members, which she uses to save Hawkman and Hawkgirl from Gentleman Ghost, Solomon Grundy, and the Demons Three. Kid Eternity helps Doctor Fate (Khalid Nassour) vanquish the Unnamed Ones and later officially joins the JSA. She is called into the afterlife by a chained-up Spectre, who is in need of her service. The Spectre bonds with Kid Eternity, who states that "vengeance is coming".

== Powers and abilities ==
=== Christopher Freeman ===
While empowered by Mister Keeper and able to use power by saying the term "Eternity", Kid Eternity can travel to and from Earth, possess ghostly powers such as intangibility and invisibility, time travel, and can call upon the spirit of the deceased, especially those originating of historical or mythological prominence, to advise him.

=== Second Kid Eternity ===
Kid Eternity has ghost-based abilities and can sense when someone has died. She later gains the ability to channel the powers of the deceased JSA members like Doctor Fate's magic and Johnny Quick's super-speed.

== Supporting cast ==
=== Villains ===
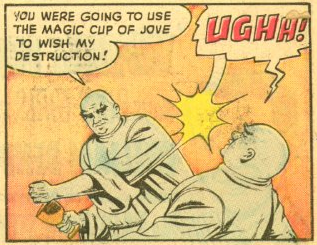
Mr Keeper fights his evil twin in a 1948 edition of the comic

- Her Highness and Silk: An elderly woman and her young, attractive assistant. Thieves and confidence scammers, the characters were humorous in nature, almost never succeeding in their plans but always willing to try another "get rich quick" scheme. Their first appearance was in Hit Comics #27 (April 1943). They were quickly spun off into their own feature; in the next issue, Her Highness was on the cover, and their spin-off lasted until issue #57. In 1982, she and Silk appeared in a Captain Marvel story guest-starring Kid Eternity (World's Finest #282).
- Master Man: Kid Eternity's opposite number, Master Man was given powers similar to the Kid's by the Devil. When Master Man said "Stygia", he could summon any evil historical or mythological figure from Stygia.
- Thuggoths: Evil creatures, part man, part beast, who were imprisoned in a pyramid 3000 years ago by Tutankhamun, but escape and plan to take over the world, killing experts on Egyptology so it is not known how to kill them. Kid Eternity tracks them to the pyramid, is attacked by one but summons up William Tell who slays it with an arrow, and later summons up Tut, who finally destroys them with fire. He only appears in Kid Eternity #1.
- Dr. Marko: A world-renowned scientist who after being paid by foreign agents to set off radio controlled mines in a city harbour, thus killing hundreds of people, is sentenced to hanging. He decides to travel through time to attack America when it was smaller and weaker, and invents a time-globe to travel to the past, although he takes the Kid with him after they realise a mortal is meddling with Eternity, not realising who he is. Marko attempts to change history twice but is foiled. Mr. Keeper then take Marko back to the day of his execution, where he is hanged, and sends the globe far into the future, where men will learn to use its great powers. Dr. Marko appeared only in Kid Eternity #2.
- Mr. Keeper's evil brother: An evil twin brother of Mr. Keeper, who was banished to Stygia by Mr. Keeper using the Cup of Jove, for rewarding evil and punishing good, but escapes to get revenge and uses his powers to help criminals. He fights Mr. Keeper, distracting him and knocks him out, before binding him and impersonating him. He is banished once more with the Cup of Jove.
- Frank Malone: Leader of a group of kidnappers who kidnap a rich girl, called Kathryn, the Greenbriar heiress, and demand a $50,000 ransom. The Kid foils the Kidnappers, and saves the girl from a fire in the car, even though she was supposed to die that day.

== In other media ==
- Kid Eternity appears as a character summon in Scribblenauts Unmasked: A DC Comics Adventure.
- Kid Eternity appears in Batman: The Brave and the Bold #6.
