= Anita Diminuta =

- Anita Diminuta first release frontpage, from 1941.

Character information
- Created by: Jesús Blasco

Publication information
- Publisher: Mis Amigas
- Formats: Original material for the series has been published as a set of graphic novels.
- Original language: Spanish
- Genre: Fantasy; Anthropomorphic
- Publication date: 1941–[[1950 in comics|1950 ]]

Creative team
- Writer(s): Jesús Blasco
- Artist(s): Jesús Blasco and family

Anita Diminuta is a Spanish comics character created in 1941 by Jesús Blasco for the feminine magazine Mis Chicas, where it held the forefront throughout the decade. In the story's creation, his brothers also collaborated, constituting the Factoría Blasco.

In 1974, the comic strip was published in a book. Also, a doll based in the character was released.

== Author ==
Blasco debuted in 1935 in the Spanish magazine Mickey, at the age of fifteen. For the magazine Boliche, however, he created the series and character named Cuto (Cutter). Originally a strip in the vein of Percy Crosby's Skippy, the character became a globe trotting and time-travelling boy adventurer, casually handling firearms and hot wiring sports cars, and romancing adult women.

Blasco's art veered from cute animal cartoons to the shadow play realism of Milton Caniff and Noel Sickles. He created strips for various audiences, and in 1941, he started working on Anita Diminuta, a girl strip.

== Description ==
Anita Diminuta was a blonde and orphan girl with braids that faced numberless hazards and horrible enemies like witches, wizards, octopuses and other dark animals.

Her partners were Soldadito (a tin soldier, lame, evidently incarnation of the Steadfast Tin Soldier, from the Hans Christian Andersen tales), Pet Mate or Mateo, a teddy bear, and Del Bosco, a curious dwarfish.

Anita fought with the two antagonists: the Carraspia Witch and the Caralampio Wizard.

She lived in a cottage with her grandmother, and with Mateo.

== Style ==
Its authors were inspired in the popular imagery, specially in the childish tales. For Salvador Vázquez de Parga, its graphism reflects influences from Arthur Rackham and William Heath Robinson.
