= Invisible Hood =

DC Comics superhero

The Invisible Hood
- New Invisible Hood from Uncle Sam and the Freedom Fighters #5, artist Daniel Acuña.

Publication information
- Publisher: Quality Comics (1940–1956); DC Comics
- First appearance: (Kent) Smash Comics #1 (August 1939) (Ken) Uncle Sam and the Freedom Fighters #5
- Created by: Art Pinajian

In-story information
- Alter ego: Kent Thurston; Ken Thurston
- Team affiliations: (Kent) Freedom Fighters; All-Star Squadron
- Notable aliases: (Kent) Invisible Justice
- Abilities: Invisibility via chemically treated cloak

The Invisible Hood is a superhero who appears in American comic books published by DC Comics. He was originally owned by Quality Comics, but was later acquired by DC Comics. He first appeared in Smash Comics #1 (August 1939), and was created by Art Pinajian, who illustrated the story under the pseudonym "Art Gordon".

== Publication history ==
The character first appeared in Smash Comics #1 in 1939, as published by Quality Comics in a story titled "Hooded Justice".

Years after the character was acquired by DC Comics, a retroactive fictional history was developed.

== Fictional character biography ==
=== Kent Thurston ===
Little is known about Kent Thurston's early history except that he was a wealthy former private detective who originally fought crime as the Invisible Hood while wearing a hooded red cloak and carrying a gas-gun. Despite his name, the Invisible Hood did not originally have the power to become invisible in his first appearance in Smash Comics #1.

In his second appearance, the Invisible Hood's robe is treated with an invisibility solution invented by a famous chemist named Professor Hans Van Dorn, who is kidnapped by a criminal and later murdered after refusing to cooperate with his kidnappers. Thurston reveals that he is the Invisible Hood to the dying Van Horn, and promises to use the power of invisibility only for good.

According to Jess Nevins' Encyclopedia of Golden Age Superheroes, "he fights enemies like the evil shaman Dr. Moku, the Green Lizard (who has a giant pet crocodile), the Voodoo Master, and Dr. Robb, who has Tutankhamen's jewel, which projects antigravity".

Although the character was always known as the Invisible Hood, the name of his series was originally titled Hooded Justice in Smash Comics #1, but was changed to Invisible Justice as of Smash Comics #2. He was featured in Smash Comics #1-32, often sharing the book with other characters, such as Archie O'Toole and Wings Wendall.

Hours before the attack on Pearl Harbor, Thurston was recruited by Uncle Sam to join the Freedom Fighters in defending the base. The entire team, except for Uncle Sam, appeared to be killed. It was later revealed that all of the team except for Magno had lived (Secret Origins #26).

The Invisible Hood survived until 1974, when he was apparently murdered by Icicle and the Mist (Starman (vol. 2) #2). Tyson Gilford (Blindside) from the superhero team Relative Heroes believes that Kent Thurston is his grandfather.

=== Ken Thurston ===
A modern version of the Invisible Hood debuts in Uncle Sam and the Freedom Fighters #5. He assists the group in escaping from S.H.A.D.E., an evil governmental organization with control of the White House. In issue #6, it is revealed that he is Ken Thurston, the great grandson of the original Invisible Hood and that he's using the same hood that the original Golden Age Hood used. Uncle Sam had used telepathy to direct Ken to the item. Later, Ken is killed by the traitorous Ray (Stan Silver), just as he is about to leave the superhero profession.

== Powers and abilities ==
Both Kent and Ken Thurston have no superpowers but they wear a chemically treated cloak that grants them invisibility.
