= Wildfire (Carol Vance Martin) =

Quality Comics superheroine

Publication information
- Publisher: Quality Comics; DC Comics
- First appearance: Smash Comics #25 (1941)
- Created by: Robert Turner; Jim Mooney

In-story information
- Alter ego: Carol Vance Martin

Wildfire (Carol Vance Martin) is a superheroine appearing in American comic books. One of the first female superheroes, she was originally published by Quality Comics during what comics historians and fans called the Golden Age of comic books. With her luxurious mane of red hair and revealing costume, she has been called "the sexiest super-hero of 1941".

According to Jess Nevins' Encyclopedia of Golden Age Superheroes, "her opponents are mostly ordinary criminals and Axis agents, although there are a few name villains, like the Frog, Mad Merlin, and the Dean of Darkness".

== Publication history ==
Wildfire appears in Smash Comics #25-37, in solo adventures drawn by Jim Mooney. She, along with many other Quality Comics superheroes, was purchased by DC Comics after Quality went out of business in the mid-1950s.

Wildfire was a redhead, who wore red pants. Her powers were gifted to her by the god of fire.

Speculation that Wildfire was originally intended to play a major role in the All-Star Squadron series, but DC objected on the basis of her name, which she shared with the Legion of Super-Heroes member is inaccurate - Roy Thomas confirmed in Tomorrows' Quality Companion that he, not DC, took the decision not to use the character. A female incarnation of Firebrand was introduced into the series with similar abilities.

== Fictional character biography ==
Her only appearance in a DC comic is in The Golden Age miniseries, by writer James Robinson and artist Paul Smith. In issue #4, the male cross-dressing character Madame Fatal appears in a panel surrounded by the Fiddler, and the Gambler, who all appear to be courting "her" while other heroes (including Wildfire) stand around giggling, evidently aware of Madame Fatal's true gender.

She also inspired another character named Wildfire in the JLA: Destiny miniseries.
