= Police Comics =

Comic book anthology

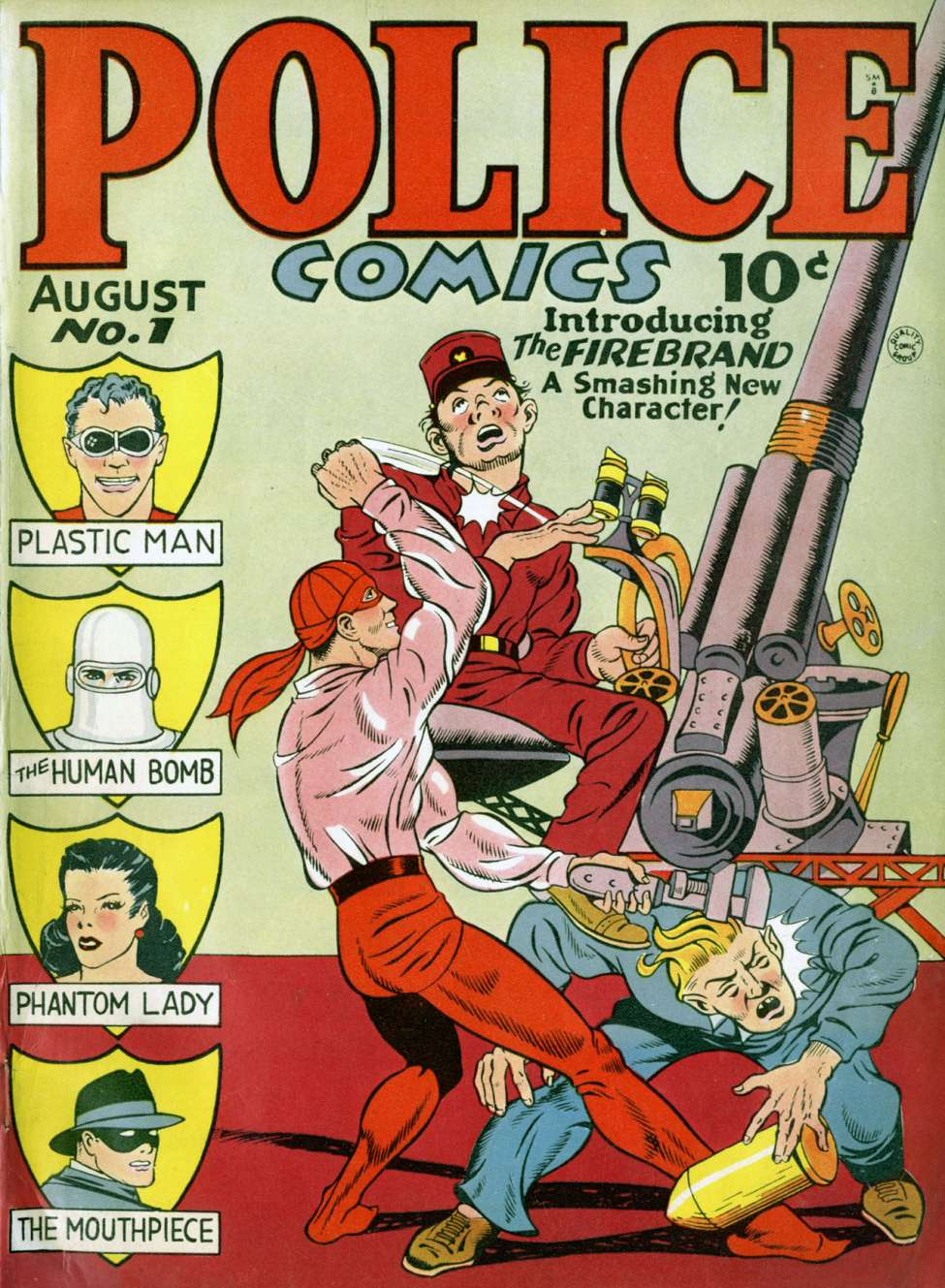
- Police Comics #1 (August 1941), art by Gil Fox

Publication information
- Publisher: Quality Comics
- Schedule: Monthly
- Format: Standard
- Publication date: August 1941 – October 1953
- No. of issues: 127
- Main characters: Mouthpiece; Plastic Man; Phantom Lady; Human Bomb; Firebrand #711

Creative team
- Written by: Jack Cole; Will Eisner; Paul Gustavson
- Artist(s): Jack Cole; Reed Crandall; Will Eisner; Gil Fox

Police Comics is a comic book anthology title published by Quality Comics (under its imprint "Comic Magazines") from 1941 until 1953. It featured short stories in the superhero, crime and humor genres.

== Publication history ==
The first issue of Police Comics featured the debuts of Plastic Man, Phantom Lady, Human Bomb, Firebrand, and Mouthpiece, all of which (except the latter) are characters that continued to be published decades later by DC Comics after it acquired Quality's properties. Firebrand, the initial lead feature, was soon eclipsed by Jack Cole's popular Plastic Man, who took the cover and the lead from issues #5–102. Other notable characters featured in Police Comics include Manhunter, who was introduced in Police Comics #8; 711, who was introduced in Police Comics #1; and Will Eisner's The Spirit, in the form of reprints of the character's newspaper comic strips.

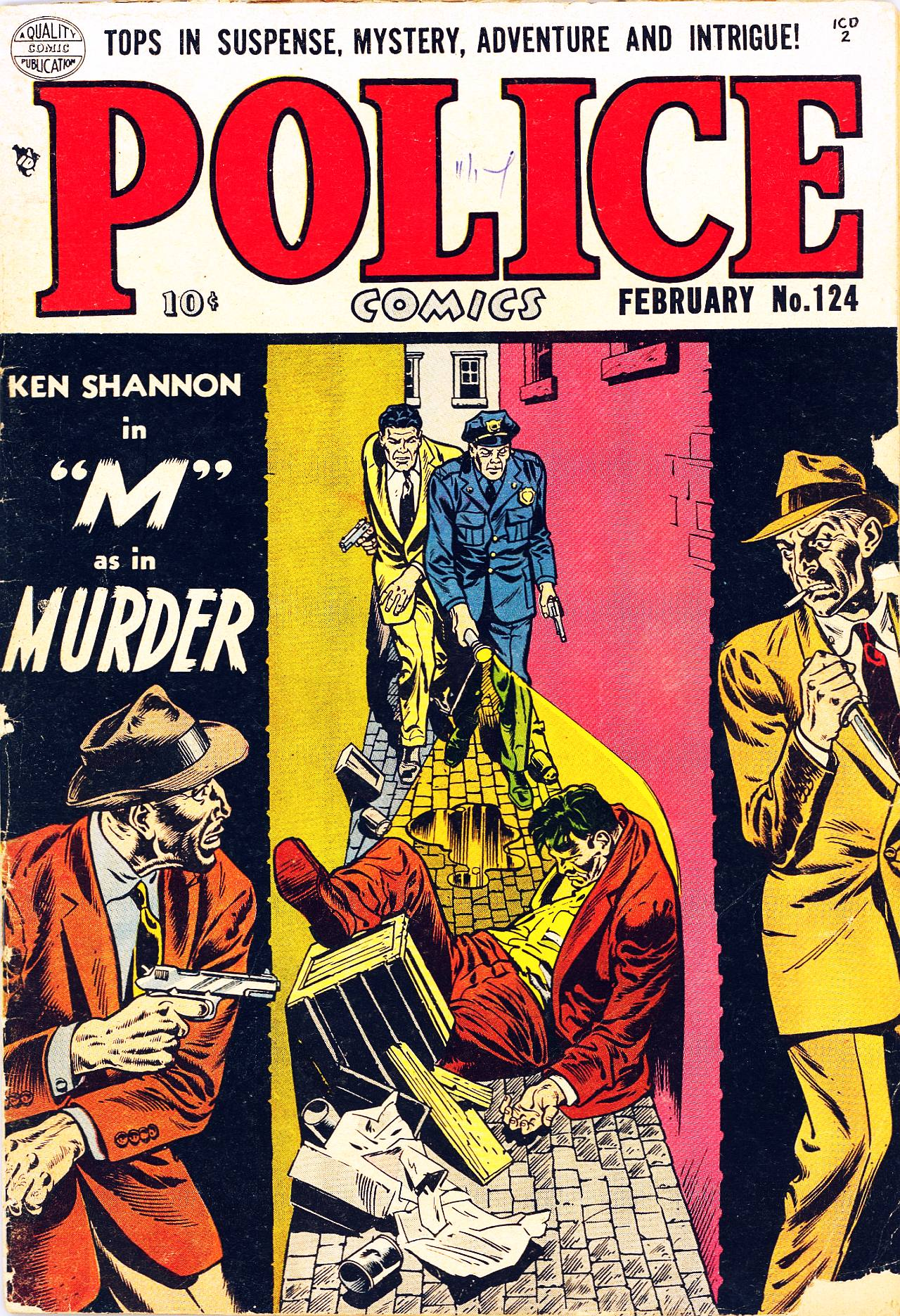
Police Comics #124 (Feb, 1953), pencils by Reed Crandall, inks by Chuck Cuidera

After the popularity of superhero comics waned, Police Comics shifted with issue #103 (December 1950) to more naturalistic detective and crime-themed stories. The series ended in October 1953 with issue #127.

== Character runs ==
- Firebrand (#1–13)
- Mouthpiece (#1–13)
- 711 (#1–15)
- Chic Carter (#1–18)
- Eagle Evans (#1–19)
- Phantom Lady (#1–23)
- Human Bomb (#1–58)
- Plastic Man (#1–102)
- Manhunter (#8–101)
- The Spirit (#11–102)
- Destiny (#16–36)
- Flatfoot Burns (#24–67)
- Candy (#37–102)
- Honeybun (#59–88)
- Ken Shannon (#103–#127)
