= Bozo the Iron Man =

Fictional character appearing in Quality Comics

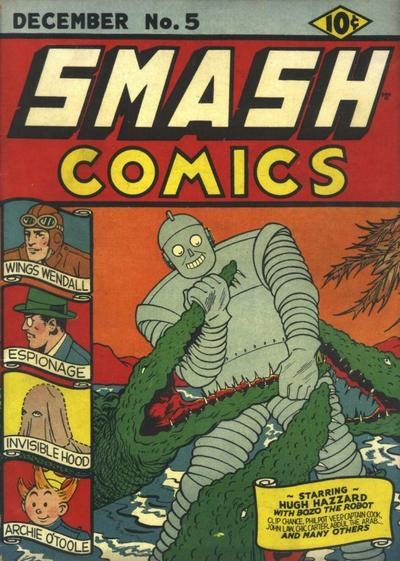
- Bozo on cover of Smash Comics #4 (Dec. 1939), art by Gill Fox.

Publication information
- Publisher: Quality Comics
- First appearance: Smash Comics #1 (Aug. 1939)
- Created by: George Brenner

In-story information
- Full name: Hugh Hazzard
- Abilities: Flight

Bozo the Iron Man is a fictional character, first appearing in Quality Comics series, Smash Comics #1 (Aug. 1939). The character's adventures were written and drawn by Quality Comics editor George Brenner, using the name "Wayne Reid".

== Publication history ==
The character was introduced in the story Hugh Hazzard and His Iron Man, and he appeared under that billing for the first 11 issues. Starting with issue #12 (July 1940), the cover billing changed to Bozo the Robot with Hugh Hazzard, and further stories were titled Bozo the Iron Man or Bozo the Robot for the remainder of his run.

Bozo and Hazzard made their last appearance in Smash Comics #41 (March 1943).

== Fictional character biography ==
In the first installment, Commissioner Hunt contacts Hugh Hazzard by signal flare and brings him into the investigation of crimes committed by a mysterious robot. Seeing the robot robbing a jewellery store, Hazzard manages to temporarily deactivate it and climbs inside its hollow chest to hitch a ride to the robot's home base. This turns out to be the laboratory of an evil scientist, Dr Von Thorp who is taken to the police by his own robot and later declared insane. The robot is again deactivated and placed on a garbage scow for disposal at sea, but Hazzard has ideas of using the robot as a crime-fighting tool. He saves the robot from its watery fate, then names it Bozo.

In the next installment, Hazzard is shown examining the robot's blueprints, and stating that the robot can be modified to fly. The modified robot, shown flying with a tiny spinning propeller on its head, is again used to foil a crime. Flying would be a part of all subsequent appearances; at times, the robot could fly faster than 400 miles an hour. The robot can also run at 70 miles an hour, and can walk on the bottom of the ocean floor.

Hazzard's method of operating Bozo varied—in some appearances, Hazzard operates the robot remotely; in others, he travels inside the robot and controls it directly, or travels on the robot's back.

After the pattern of the first adventure, Hugh Hazzard tended to encounter criminals committing crimes with scientific gadgetry, and these criminals tended to become the victims of their own weapons.

As World War II began, Quality Comics addressed the world situation by introducing villain surrogates into their fictional universe. Hugh and Bozo fought "Hitlin" and "the Batzis" in Smash Comics #8 (March 1940), and then ended the war the next month in #9 (April 1940) by traveling to "Hatvia" and defeating Dictator "Motler" and his associate, "Fritz Goeing". The wish-fulfillment story ends with a newspaper headline: "World Peace Proclaimed".

The character's final story, in Smash Comics #41, was called "Collecting Scrap". At the end of the story, neighborhood kids collecting scrap metal for the war chase Bozo, intending to reduce him to scrap.

In 1956, Quality Comics characters were sold to DC Comics. Quality's Blackhawk continued to be published without interruption, but most of their other characters languished. While most of the classic Quality superheroes have seen print again over the years, Hugh Hazzard has not, though a robot resembling Bozo did make a single-panel appearance in an issue of James Robinson's Starman (issue #64, April 2000), where the inactive robot was in a store-room among a Japanese collector's hoard of Golden Age superhero artifacts.

In Robinson's Superman run, Bozo appears alongside other robots including Mekanique, Robotman, and various G.I. Robot models. The robots are part of Sam Lane's Project 7734.

== Influence ==
Gonzo the Mechanical Bastard, a robot supervillain created for DC's 2006 One Year Later event, was derived from a character proposal by Grant Morrison updating Bozo. The final Gonzo character eventually became something very different: a psychotic android that can impersonate a world leader.
