= Cuto (comic) =

Series of comics by Jesús Blasco

Cuto is a series of comics created by Jesús Blasco in 1935 and published during 1940 and 1950 in the magazine called Chicos. Cuto is the most emblematic comic character in the history of Spanish comics, it has been compared to Tintin.

== Fictional character biography ==
Cuto is a Spanish boy, living in San Francisco, California. He works as a journalist, fact that leads him to getting caught up in police intrigues or international espionage. His adventures take place in exotic places and there are no or a few references to Spain, other than the character's nationality.

== Publishing trajectory ==
Blasco returns to Barcelona in 1940 after a period in a French concentration camp, starts working in the magazine "Chicos", directed by Consuelo Gil. The cartoonist reuses the character for this publication. Because of the lack of paper, he will produce three quarters of the series without being able to delete or retouch any page. A lot of these series were lost.

The first adventure of Cuto is "El Pequeño Policía" (16 p., number 143 to 158 of Chicos, 1940 to 3/41), where he works as a newsboy in New York City. The next comic was "Sin Rumbo" (, number 161 to 202 of "Chicos", 2/04/1941 to 25/02/42), takes place in India and Alaska, "El Pájaro Azul (Cuto héroe del aire)" (comic of 44 p., Ediciones Chicos, 1942) and "El Mundo Perdido" (59 p., number 206 to 267 of "Chicos", 25/03/1942 to 15/09/43), where Cuto travels to Egypt.

In the mid-1940s, "Tragedia en Oriente" (numbers 343 to 383 of "Chicos", 7/03/1945 to 28/04/1946) and "En los dominios de los sioux" (numbers 385 to 448 of "Chicos", 12/05/1946 to 3/08/1947) are published. Cuto is a teenager and the comic was a national phenomenon.
