= List of Quality Comics characters =

Quality Comics was a comic book company from the Golden Age of Comic Books. It operated from 1937 to 1956 and sold many anthology comic books that starred superheroes, many of which were adopted by DC Comics when they purchased Quality Comics, and others were not, entering the public domain.

== 711 ==
711 was created by George Brenner and published by Quality Comics. 711 first appeared in Police Comics #1 (August 1941) and lasted until #15 (January 1943), when he was killed.

Daniel Dyce was a District Attorney who was almost an exact twin of his friend, Jacob Horn. Jacob was soon to be sent to prison, but wanted to see his wife give birth, so Daniel agreed to become a prisoner in Jacob's place. However, Jacob is killed in a car crash on the way to the hospital, so Daniel was stuck in jail. Daniel was able to tunnel himself free, but instead of escaping, he decided to return to his cell. Each night he uses his tunnel to go outside and fight crime, then returns before the morning. Dyce adopts the name 711, a reference to his prisoner number. One of his enemies is the costumed villain Brickbat.

After two years of adventures Daniel Dyce was killed by the mobster Oscar Jones. The hero Destiny sees this take place, and starts his crime fighting career when 711 died, replacing his feature in Police Comics.

Like many early comic book heroes, 711 did not wear a traditional costume but rather was modeled after the traditional pulp magazine heroes. He wore a green cape, a brown business suit, and a wide-brimmed fedora which cast his eyes in shadow. 711's trademark was a calling card made of a mirror with bars painted over it; when an unlucky criminal would look at the card, they would see themselves behind bars.

Brenner replaced 711 with a new hero — a mysterious figure who discovers that he has the powers of clairvoyance and teleportation, and uses them to bring 711's murderer to justice. The new hero christens himself "Destiny", and continues the series.

Following the Golden Age, many of the Quality Comics characters were purchased by DC Comics, while others lapsed into the public domain. DC has used 711 only once in their publications, a Millennium Edition reprint of his first appearance.

== Abdul the Arab ==
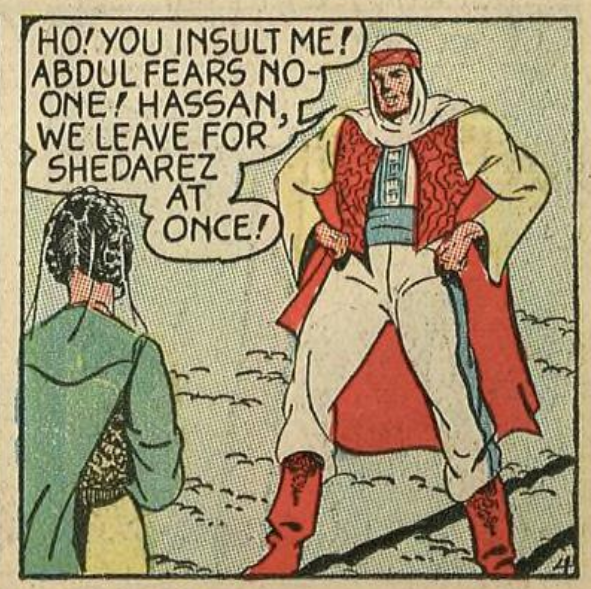
Abdul the Arab in Smash Comics #12

Abdul the Arab first appeared in Smash Comics #1 (August 1939). Abdul is an Arab sheikh who is aligned with the British intelligence agencies in the Middle East. He was originally created by Vernon Henkel.

== Ace of Space ==
The Ace of Space first appeared in Feature Comics #38 (November 1940).

== Angles O'Day ==
Angles O'Day first appeared in Ken Shannon #1 (October 1951).

== Archie Atkins ==
Archie Atkins, Desert Scout first appeared in Military Comics #1 (August 1941).

== Arizona Ames / Arizona Raines ==
Arizona Ames first appeared in Crack Western #63 (November 1949). His name was changed to Arizona Raines without explanation in issue #66 (May 1950).

== Atomictot ==
Atomictot first appeared in All Humor Comics #2 (Summer 1946).

== The Barker ==
Carnie Calahan was a circus barker who first appeared in National Comics #42 (May 1944).

== Betty Bates ==
Betty Bates, Lady-at-Law first appeared in Hit Comics #4 (October 1940). She is a tough criminal defense attorney in 1940's New York who relied on unconventional (and dubiously legal) methods. She was notably one of the only female attorneys practicing at the time.

=== Betty Bates in other media ===
Elizabeth Bates appears in the Creature Commandos episode "Chasing Squirrels", voiced by Linda Cardellini.

== Bill the Magnificent ==
Bill the Magnificent first appeared in Hit Comics #25 (December 1942).

== Black Condor ==
The Black Condor first appeared in Crack Comics #1 (May 1940).

== Blackhawk ==
The Blackhawks first appeared in Military Comics #1 (August 1941).

== Black Roger ==
Black Roger first appeared in Buccaneers #19 (January 1950).

== Black X ==
Black X (Richard Spencer) is a secret agent who first appeared in Quality's Feature Funnies #13 (1938). In August 1939, Black X moved from Feature to Smash Comics. In the first five issues of Smash Comics, the character was called Black Ace, then he reverted to the original name. His sidekick is Batu, a telepathic Indian.

According to Jess Nevins' Encyclopedia of Golden Age Superheroes, his enemies include "the foreign spy Baron Basil, the Death Squadron and their Suicide Torpedoes, Proxoss the Revolutionary, the Hunchback of Notre Dame, the Legion of Living Bombs, and the femme fatale Madame Doom."

In 1939, Black X tangled with the seductive spy Madame Doom, and over the course of several stories, he fell in love with her, wondering if he could betray his country to be with the agent of an enemy nation. Discovering that she's building an army of exploding human bombs in a 1940 story, Black X renounced his affection, and Madame Doom apparently died in an explosion—although she continued to return periodically through 1943.

The character continued in Smash Comics until issue #85 (Oct 1949).

== Blaze Barton ==
Blaze Barton first appeared in Hit Comics #1 (July 1940).

== Blimpy ==
Blimpy first appeared in Feature Comics #64 (January 1943).

== The Blue Tracer ==
Captain Bill Dunn and Boomerang Jones, crew of The Blue Tracer, first appeared in Military Comics #1 (August 1941). The Blue Tracer is the name of Bill Dunn's super-vehicle, which can become a tank, airplane, or submarine.

The Blue Tracer appeared in issues #1 through #16 of Military Comics. The characters were acquired by DC Comics, along with the rest of Quality Comics' properties in the 1950s. However, these characters had lapsed into public domain before that.

The Blue Tracer's origin story is told in the first appearance, in Military Comics #1. William "Wild Bill" Dunn is an American engineer working with the British Army in a secluded section of Ethiopia. While working, his team is attacked by a group of supernatural beings named the M'bujies. The M'bujies wound Dunn and kill his teammates. Dunn is rescued by "Boomerang" Jones, an Australian soldier who had been given up for dead and is now fighting his own private war against the Nazis. After Dunn regains his strength, the two men create a super-vehicle out of captured Nazi equipment that they name the Blue Tracer. It can become a tank, airplane, or submarine. They then use it to destroy the M'bujies and escape the jungle. The two travel the world and fight the Axis forces during the rest of the war, with Dunn at the head and Jones as his sidekick.

According to Jess Nevins' Encyclopedia of Golden Age Superheroes, the Blue Tracer's foes "range from Nazis to the Yellow Butcher of Koko Nor to Dr. Schwein, who has created a regeneration formula for German soldiers."

The last appearance of the Blue Tracer was in Military Comics #16, according to the Grand Comics Database.

The Blue Tracer would later appear many years later in the 2018 Freedom Fighters series. The vehicle is portrayed as the Freedom Fighters mobile base and is piloted by a man named Cache.

== Bob and Swab ==
Bob Masters and Swab Decker first appeared in Hit Comics #1 (July 1940).

== Bozo the Iron Man ==
Bozo the Iron Man and Hugh Hazzard first appeared in Smash Comics #1 (August 1939).

== Bruce Blackburn ==
Bruce Blackburn first appeared in Feature Comics #32 (May 1940). He became The Destroying Demon in issue #39 (December 1940).

== Burp the Twerp ==
Burp the Twerp first appeared in Police Comics #2 (September 1941).

== Candy O'Connor ==
Candace "Candy" O'Connor first appeared in Police Comics #37 (December 1944).

== Captain Cook ==
Captain Cook of Scotland Yard first appeared in Feature Funnies #13 (October 1938).

== Captain Daring ==
Captain Daring first appeared in Buccaneers #19 (January 1950).

== Captain Flagg ==
Captain Jim Flagg first appeared in Hit Comics #22 (June 1942).

== Captain Triumph ==
Captain Triumph first appeared in Crack Comics #27 (January 1943).

== Casey Jones ==
Casey Jones first appeared in Hit Comics #1 (July 1940).

== Chic Carter ==
Chic Carter first appeared in Smash Comics #1 (August 1939). He became The Sword in issue #24 (July 1941).

== Choo Choo and Cherry ==
Choo Choo LaMoe and Cherry Lane first appeared in Military Comics #35 (January 1945).

== Clip Chance ==
Clip Chance, student athlete at Cliffside College, first appeared in Feature Funnies #7 (April 1938).

== The Clock ==
The Clock first appeared simultaneously in Funny Pages v1#6 (November 1936) and Funny Picture Stories v1#1 (November 1936) published by the Comics Magazine Company. He debuted at Quality Comics in Feature Funnies #3 (December 1937).

== Comet Kelly ==
Lt. Douglas "Comet" Kelly first appeared in Hit Comics #22 (June 1942).

== Cyclone ==
Cyclone first appeared in National Comics #1 (July 1940).

== Daffy Dill ==
Daffy Dill first appeared in Smash Comics #41 (March 1943).

== The Death Patrol ==
The Death Patrol first appeared in Military Comics #1 (August 1941).

== Destiny ==
Destiny first appeared in Police Comics #15 (January 1943).

== Destroyer 171 ==
Lt. Commander Harvey Blake, the skipper of the U.S.S. Pawnee (Destroyer 171), and Executive Officer Fred Conroy first appeared in National Comics #23 (June 1942). Blake's name was given as "Lake" in issues #23-24, #26 and #29, and as "Blake" in issues #25, #27-28 and #30-53.

== Doll Girl ==
Martha Roberts first appeared in Feature Comics #27 (December 1939). She became Midge in Feature Comics #77 (April 1944), followed by Doll Girl in Doll Man #37 (December 1951).

== Doll Man ==
Doll Man first appeared in Feature Comics #27 (December 1939).

== Don Glory ==
Don Glory first appeared in Hit Comics #8 (February 1941).

== Eagle Evans ==
Eagle Evans first appeared in Police Comics #1 (August 1941).

== Eric Falcon ==
Eric Falcon first appeared in Buccaneers #19 (January 1950).

== Ezra Jones ==
Ezra Jones first appeared in Blackhawk #9 (Winter 1944).

== The Fargo Kid ==
The Fargo Kid first appeared in Feature Comics #47 (August 1941).

== Fear ==
Fear first appeared in Modern Comics #49 (May 1946).

== Firebrand ==
Firebrand first appeared in Police Comics #1 (August 1941).

== Frontier Marshal ==
U.S. Marshal Bob Allen first appeared in Crack Western #63 (November 1949).

== G-2 ==
G-2 first appeared in National Comics #27 (December 1942).

== The Gallant Knight ==
Sir Tyrone Neville first appeared in Feature Funnies #7 (April 1938).

== Ghost of Flanders ==
The Ghost of Flanders first appeared in Hit Comics #18 (December 1941).

== The Hawk ==
The Hawk (T. James Harrington II) first appeared in Feature Funnies #2 (November 1937).

== Hawks of the Seas ==
The Hawk first appeared in the U.K. in Wags #17 (April 23, 1937). This story was reprinted in the U.S. in Feature Funnies #3 (December 1937). This character is different from the 'T. James Harrington II' version (see above).

== Her Highness and Silk ==
Her Highness and Silk first appeared in Hit Comics #27 (April 1943).

== Human Bomb ==
The Human Bomb first appeared in Police Comics #1 (August 1941). Hustace Throckmorton first appeared in Police Comics #15 (January 1943). The Bombardiers first appeared in Police Comics #21 (August 1943).

== Inferior Man ==
Inferior Man first appeared in Military Comics #7 (February 1942).

== Invisible Hood ==
The Invisible Hood first appeared in Smash Comics #1 (August 1939).

== Jack and Jill, Super Sleuths ==
Jack Doe and his wife Jill Doe first appeared in Hit Comics #1 (July 1940).

== Jester ==
The Jester first appeared in Smash Comics #22 (May 1941).

== Joe Hercules ==
Joe Hercules first appeared in Hit Comics #1 (July 1940).

== Johnny Doughboy ==
Johnny Doughboy first appeared in Military Comics #14 (December 1942).

== Just 'n' Right ==
Just 'n' Right first appeared in The Doll Man Quarterly #1 (Autumn 1941).

== Ken Shannon ==
Ken Shannon first appeared in Police Comics #103 (December 1950).

== Kid Dixon ==
Danny "Kid" Dixon first appeared in National Comics #1 (July 1940).

== Kid Eternity ==
Kid Eternity first appeared in Hit Comics #25 (December 1942).

== The Kid Patrol ==
The Kid Patrol first appeared in National Comics #1 (July 1940).

== Lady Luck ==
Lady Luck first appeared in The Spirit Section #1 (June 2, 1940). Her adventures were reprinted in Quality Comics beginning with Smash Comics #42 (April 1943).

== Lee Preston ==
Lee Preston of the Red Cross first appeared in Crack Comics #1 (May 1940).

== Lion Boy ==
Lion Boy first appeared in Hit Comics #6 (December 1940).

== Loops and Banks ==
Loops McCann and Banks Barrows first appeared in Military Comics #1 (August 1941).

== Madam Fatal ==
Madam Fatal first appeared in Crack Comics #1 (May 1940).

== Magno the Magnetic Man ==
Magno the Magnetic Man appeared in Quality Comics from 1940 to 1956. The character was created by Paul Gustavson. His first appearance was in Smash Comics #13 (August 1940). He was one of the characters that were purchased by DC Comics when Quality Comics sold their assets. However, the copyright on these comics expired before that, making them public domain.

Tom Dalton was a lineman for an electric company until he was shocked and killed by 10,000 D.C. volts of electricity. He was brought back to life by a coworker, who used 10,000 A.C. volts. Tom Dalton became Magno. He was powered by the very electricity that saved his life, and he used it to fight crime with his magnetic and electrical abilities. He sometimes ran out of power and had to recharge himself by touching exposed wires. He was featured in Smash Comics until issue #21 (April 1941). He then moved to two Ace Magazines comics: Super-Mystery Comics, from v1 #1 to v6 #4 (July 1940–February 1947, 34 issues); and to Four Favorites, from issue #1 to #26 (Sept 1941-Nov 1946).

In his fourth story, Magno was joined by a sidekick—Davey, a young man with the powers of magnetic attraction and repulsion who is the younger brother of female private eye Carole Landis. Davey's powers had no origin in particular. Magno and Davey became partners, and worked for the government on secret missions.

According to Jess Nevins' Encyclopedia of Golden Age Superheroes, "Magno and Davey take on a variety of foes: human-sacrificing Aztec cultists, the four-armed, fanged Yellow Peril Professor Octopus, and Magno and Davey's recurring foe, the Clown, who works out of a traveling circus and uses hyper-intelligent trained rats to carry out his crimes".

Magno was briefly revived in 1984 for two issues of All-Star Squadron, #31 and 32 (March–April 1984). In this story, Magno is contacted by Uncle Sam hours before the attack on Pearl Harbor to join the Freedom Fighters and defend the base. Magno accepts, and dies while fighting the Japanese, along with the other members of the Freedom Fighters. While most of the other members are later revealed to have survived, Magno is not. He's also seen in Secret Origins vol 2 #26 (May 1988), in the origin story for Miss America.

=== Second Magno ===
An unnamed, second Magno appeared in Uncle Sam and the Freedom Fighters v2 #3. Also having the power of electrokinesis, Magno was under mind control from Director Robbins' and was a member of his Crusaders team. After Red Bee evolved into an alien bug hybrid, she killed Director Robbins which allowed the Crusaders to be free from his mind control. Magno and the Crusaders then joined the Freedom Fighters' team.

== Manhunter ==
Manhunter first appeared in Police Comics #8 (March 1942).

== Margo the Magician ==
Margo the Magician first appeared in Uncle Sam Quarterly #2 (Winter 1941).

== The Marksman ==
The Marksman first appeared in Smash Comics #33 (May 1942).

== Marmaduke Mouse ==
Marmaduke Mouse, art by Ernie Hart.

Marmaduke was a talking animal character created by Ernie Hart in 1944 and was Quality Comics' third longest-running title behind Blackhawk and Plastic Man. He first appeared in Hit Comics #35 (Spring 1945) where he was a minor character for several issues, eventually receiving his own series in 1946 which ran for 65 issues, until December 1956. According to the Encyclopedia of Comic Books and Graphic Novels, the series "was, in the beginning, were solidly drawn and reasonably funny, but lacked a convincing sense of action and character."

== Merlin the Magician ==
Merlin the Magician first appeared in National Comics #1 (July 1940).

== Midnight ==
Midnight first appeared in Smash Comics #18 (January 1941).

== Miss America ==
Miss America first appeared in Military Comics #1 (August 1941). She did not don a costume until issue #4 (November 1941).

== Mitymite ==
Mitymite first appeared in All Humor Comics #1 (Spring 1946).

== Molly the Model ==
Molly Maloney first appeared in Crack Comics #1 (May 1940).

== Monsieur X ==
Monsieur X first appeared in Military Comics #6 (January 1942).

== The Mouthpiece ==
The Mouthpiece first appeared in Police Comics #1 (August 1941) and lasted until #13. He was created by Fred Guardineer. Although, like all Quality characters, he is ostensibly owned by DC Comics after it acquired Quality's assets, he lapsed into public domain prior to the said acquisition.

Bill Perkins was a District Attorney who thought that the law was not strong enough. He decided to don a costume to apprehend criminals that escaped justice, and became the Mouthpiece. He carries a gun and handcuffs. He was ruthless, and was prepared to kill criminals when he needed to. Once, he even threw a harpoon into the back of a fleeing opponent (he'd run out of bullets), rather than let him get away.

He was a skilled brawler and marksman, an above-average detective and an expert in criminal law.

== Neon the Unknown ==
Neon the Unknown first appeared in Hit Comics #1 (July 1940).

== The Old Witch ==
The Old Witch first appeared in Hit Comics #1 (July 1940).

== The Orchid ==
The Orchid first appeared in Detective Picture Stories #2 (January 1937) published by the Comics Magazine Company. She debuted at Quality Comics in Feature Funnies #3 (December 1937).

== Pen Miller ==
Pen Miller first appeared in National Comics #1 (July 1940).

== The Phantom Clipper ==
Tiger Shark and Captain Seth Perkins, crew of The Phantom Clipper, first appeared in Military Comics #9 (April 1942).

== Phantom Lady ==
Phantom Lady first appeared in Police Comics #1 (August 1941).

== Plastic Man ==
Plastic Man first appeared in Police Comics #1 (August 1941).

== Poison Ivy ==
Poison Ivy first appeared in Feature Comics #32 (May 1940).

== Private Dogtag ==
Private Dogtag first appeared in Military Comics #14 (December 1942).

== Prop Powers ==
Captain Prop Powers of the U.S. Coast Guard first appeared in National Comics #1 (July 1940).

== The Purple Trio ==
The Purple Trio first appeared in Smash Comics #13 (August 1940).

== Quicksilver ==
Quicksilver first appeared in National Comics #5 (November 1940).

== The Raven ==
The Raven first appeared in Feature Comics #60 (September 1942).

== The Ray ==
The Ray first appeared in Smash Comics #14 (September 1940).

== Red Bee ==
The Red Bee first appeared in Hit Comics #1 (July 1940).

== Red Torpedo ==
The Red Torpedo first appeared in Crack Comics #1 (May 1940).

== Robin Hood ==
Robin Hood first appeared in Robin Hood Tales #1 (February 1956).

== Rookie Rankin ==
Rookie Rankin first appeared in Smash Comics #25 (August 1941).

== Rusty Ryan ==
Rusty Ryan first appeared in Feature Comics #32 (May 1940). He first donned a costume in issue #45 (June 1941). The Boyville Brigadiers first appeared in Feature Comics #45 (June 1941).

== Sally O'Neil ==
Sally O'Neil, policewoman first appeared in National Comics #1 (July 1940).

== Samar ==
Samar first appeared in Feature Comics #32 (May 1940).

== The Scarlet Seal ==
The Scarlet Seal first appeared in Smash Comics #16 (November 1940).

== Shot and Shell ==
Colonel Sam Shot and Slim Shell first appeared in Military Comics #1 (August 1941).

== The Sniper ==
The Sniper first appeared in Military Comics #5 (December 1941).

== The Space Legion ==
Captain Rock Braddon of The Space Legion first appeared in Crack Comics #1 (May 1940).

== The Spider ==
The Spider first appeared in Crack Comics #1 (May 1940).

== Spider Widow ==
The Spider Widow first appeared in Feature Comics #57 (June 1942).

== The Spirit ==
Will Eisner's The Spirit (Denny Colt) first appeared in Iowa's Register and Tribune Syndicate newspaper insert The Spirit Section #1 (June 2, 1940). Two years later, on July 3, 1942, The Spirit made his first actual comic book appearance in Police Comics #11 (September 1942); it reprints his 1940 origin from strip #1. The Spirit's Quality Comics appearances end in issue #102 (November 1950).

== Spitfire ==
Tex Adams, ace test pilot, first appeared in Crack Comics #15 (August 1941). He was nicknamed Spitfire in issue #16 (September 1941).

== Steele Kerrigan ==
Steele Kerrigan first appeared in Police Comics #1 (August 1941).

== Stormy Foster the Great Defender ==
The Great Defender first appeared in Hit Comics #18 (December 1941).

== The Strange Twins ==
Inspector Douglas Strange of Scotland Yard and his criminal twin brother Rodney Strange first appeared in Hit Comics #1 (July 1940). They learned that they were brothers in issue #7 (January 1941).

== Swing Sisson ==
Swing Sisson first appeared in Feature Comics #49 (October 1941).

== The Swordfish ==
Ensign Jack Smith, who piloted an electric battery driven one-man submarine named The Swordfish for the U.S. Navy, first appeared in Hit Comics #22 (June 1942).

== T-Man ==
Treasury Agent Pete Trask first appeared in Police Comics #103 (December 1950).

== Tommy Tinkle ==
Tommy Tinkle first appeared in Hit Comics #1 (July 1940).

== Tor the Magic Master ==
Tor first appeared in Crack Comics #10 (February 1941).

== Torchy Todd ==
Torchy Todd first appeared in Doll Man Quarterly #8 (Spring 1946).

== Two-Gun Lil ==
Two-Gun Lil first appeared in Crack Western #63 (November 1949).

== Uncle Sam ==
Uncle Sam first appeared in National Comics #1 (July 1940).

== The Unknown ==
The Unknown first appeared in National Comics #23 (June 1942).

== USA the Spirit of Old Glory ==
USA the Spirit of Old Glory first appeared in Feature Comics #42 (March 1941).

== The Voice ==
The Voice first appeared in Feature Comics #32 (May 1940).

== The Whistler ==
After the murder of his brother in National Comics #48 (June 1945), Mallory Drake became The Whistler.

== Wildfire ==
Wildfire first appeared in Smash Comics #25 (August 1941).

== Will Bragg ==
Will Bragg first appeared in Modern Comics #47 (March 1946).

== Wings Wendall ==
Wings Wendall first appeared in Smash Comics #1 (August 1939). He first donned a costume in issue #24 (July 1941).

== Wizard Wells ==
Wizard Wells first appeared in Crack Comics #1 (May 1940).

== Wonder Boy ==
Wonder Boy first appeared in National Comics #1 (July 1940).

== X of the Underground ==
X of the Underground first appeared in Military Comics #8 (March 1942).

== X-5 / G-5 ==
X-5, Super Agent first appeared in Hit Comics #1 (July 1940). His codename was changed to G-5 in issue #5 (November 1940).

== Yankee Eagle (Jerry Noble) ==
Jerry Noble, The Yankee Eagle first appeared in Military Comics #1 (August 1941).

== Yankee Eagle (Larry Noble) ==
Larry Noble, The Yankee Eagle first appeared in Smash Comics #38 (December 1942).

== Zero the Ghost Detective ==
Zero first appeared in Feature Comics #32 (May 1940).
