= Hit Comics =

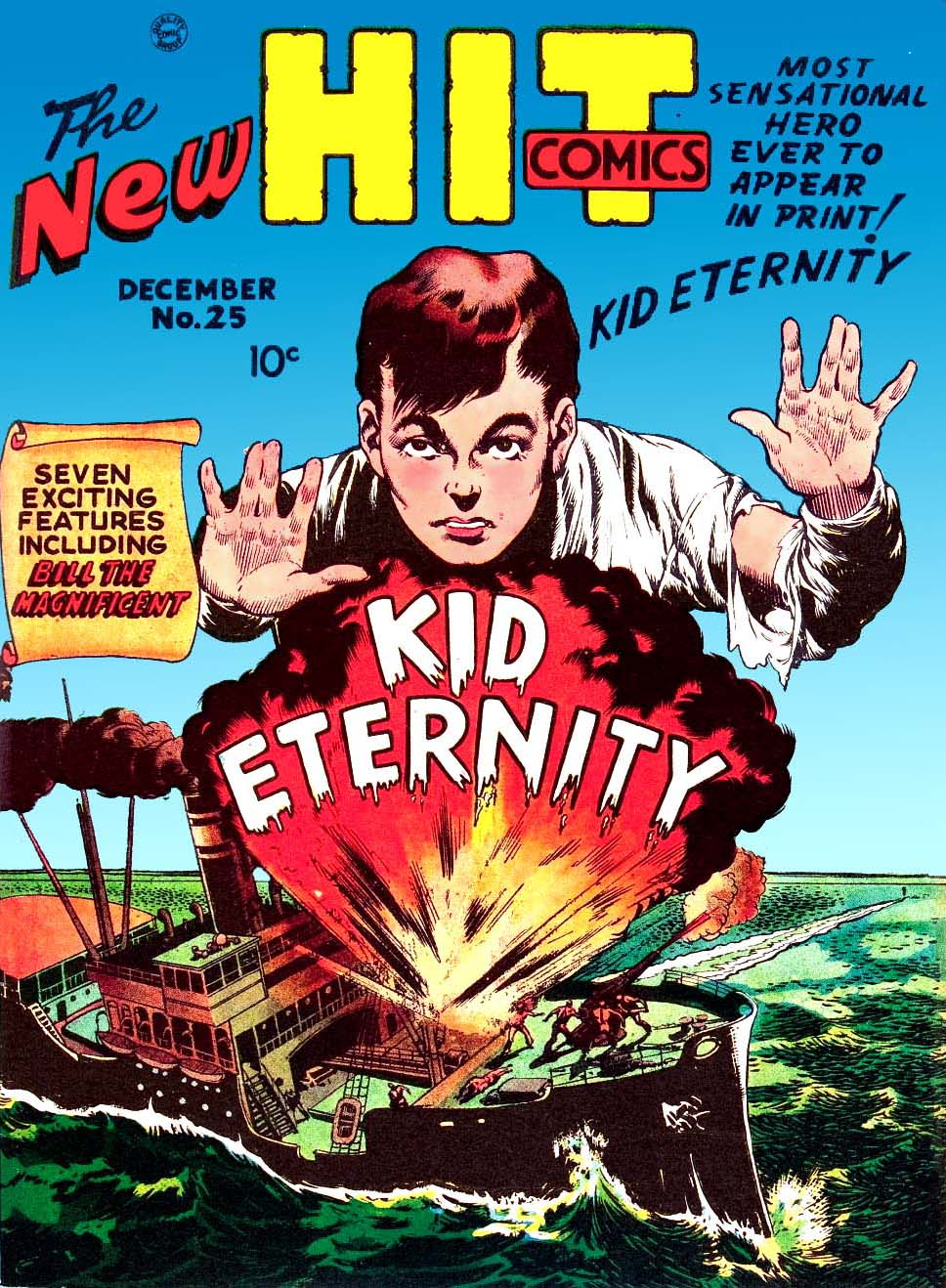
- Issue #25 (December 1942)

Publication information
- Publisher: Quality Comics
- Schedule: Monthly
- Format: Standard
- Publication date: July 1940 – July 1950
- No. of issues: 65
- Main character(s): Hercules; Red Bee; Neon the Unknown; Lion Boy; Stormy Foster; Kid Eternity

Creative team
- Written by: Toni Blum, Jerry Iger, Otto Binder
- Artist(s): Charles Nicholas, Lou Fine, Henry C. Kiefer, Sheldon Moldoff

Hit Comics is a comic book anthology title published by Quality Comics during the Golden Age of Comic Books from 1940 until 1950.

The first issue of Hit Comics featured the debut of Red Bee and Neon the Unknown, among others. The comic book series had a series of other rotating cover features, including Hercules, Stormy Foster, and Lion Boy.

In December 1942 (issue #25), the entire line-up of features at Hit Comics changed, with a new additional character called Kid Eternity. The character proved to be popular enough that even his antagonists, Her Highness and Silk, were given their own strip in Hit Comics issues #29 through #57. When Quality Comics began expanding their post-war line of titles in the spring of 1946, Kid Eternity got his own self-titled comic book.

By the late 1940s, however, Quality Comics experienced the same post-war bust that most superhero comics were. In November 1949, Kid Eternity's self-titled magazine was discontinued (with issue #18) and his lead slot in Hit Comics was given over to Jeb Rivers, a riverboat captain (with issue #61). The anthology title would end in July 1950.
