= Firebrand (DC Comics) =

Characters created by DC Comics

Publication information
- Publisher: Quality Comics; DC Comics
- First appearance: Police Comics #1 (August 1941)
- Created by: (Rod); S.M. Iger; Reed Crandall (Danette); Roy Thomas; Danette Thomas; Jerry Ordway; Rich Buckler (Sanchez); Brian Augustyn; Sal Velluto (Twist); Justin Gray; Jimmy Palmiotti; Dan Jurgens

In-story information
- Alter ego: Rod Reilly; Danette Reilly; Alexander "Alex" Sanchez; Andre Twist; Janet Fals
- Team affiliations: (Rod, Twist); Freedom Fighters (Danette); All-Star Squadron
- Abilities: (Rod): Olympic-level athlete Superb hand to hand combatant Peak physical condition (Danette): Plasma projection Ability to control heat (Sanchez): Enhanced strength and speed and green flame generation due to surgical implants and advanced armor (Twist): Control over fire

Firebrand is a name of several characters appearing in American comic books published by DC Comics.

== Fictional character biography ==
=== Rod Reilly ===
Firebrand (Rod Reilly), cover to Police Comics #2 (September 1941).

Published by Quality Comics from August 1941 to November 1942, Rod Reilly was the bored and wealthy socialite son of a steel tycoon, who decided to fight crime with his servant and friend, "Slugger" Dunn. Originally drawn by Reed Crandall, Firebrand appeared in Police Comics, issues #1 through 13, at which time his series was canceled. Firebrand's costume consisted of a transparent shirt and red pants, with a bandana mask covering the top half of his face. He uses a lariat, and can climb buildings using vacuum cups.

After DC purchased Quality Comics, Firebrand was largely left on the sidelines until the mid-1970s, when he joined the Freedom Fighters. He was killed in a fight with the Silver Ghost, but that occurred only in a photocopied issue of Cancelled Comic Cavalcade, which was never released to public and thus unsure as to whether it is considered part of the current DC Universe.

When DC collected most of their characters into the All-Star Squadron, it was retconned that Rod had been injured in the surprise attack and replaced by his sister, Danette Reilly.

In All-Star Squadron #5 (1981), Danette discovers that Rod is Firebrand while staying at his penthouse. Musing about Rod's relationship with his bodyguard, Slugger Dunn, she wonders "though what a confirmed bachelor playboy like my brother needed with a bodyguard, I never understood", and then finds a hidden closet that leads her to think that "from the look of these clothes, I didn't know my brother quite as well as I thought I did!".

=== Danette Reilly ===
Firebrand (Danette Reilly), from the cover to All-Star Squadron #5 (January 1982).

Volcanologist Danette Reilly is the sister of Rod Reilly, the first Firebrand. First introduced in a special "All-Star Squadron" preview in Justice League of America #193 (August 1981), Danette was studying volcanos north of Hawaii when she was kidnapped by the time-travelling villain Per Degaton and the sorcerer Wotan. During her escape, Wotan hit her with a magical blast and hurled her into a pit of lava. The combination of his magic and the lava not only allowed her to survive, but gave her the power to control heat and project fire blasts . Her powers surfaced after she discovered her brother Rod's costume and put it on. As Rod had been injured during the attack, Danette decided to become the new Firebrand. Due to Degaton going back to future when he was defeated, the All-Star Squadron forgot his attack. Originally, she was quite racist towards the Japanese, but she visited her brother in hospital and he revealed he had been saved from death by a soldier whose parents were from Japan, and who later died from his wounds. Firebrand realized she had been racist and would show more respect towards those from Japan.

Danette appeared in Crisis on Infinite Earths, wherein she was briefly rejoined by her former lover, the reluctant supervillain Cyclotron. Cyclotron, although deceased, phased into her time to assist her. Danette assumed partial custody of his daughter Terri, along with fellow hero the Atom.

In Stars and S.T.R.I.P.E. (2000), Firebrand was revealed to have been killed by the Dragon King. She has largely remained dead since. During the Absolute Power event (2024), Firebrand's spirit is revealed to be held inside the Well of Souls in Themyscira and is used as a power source by the Amazo android Paradise Lost.

Her name is a homage to creator Roy Thomas' wife, Danette Thomas.

The Quality Comics heroine Wildfire was originally intended to play a major role in the All-Star Squadron but DC objected on the basis of her name, which she shared with the Legion of Super-Heroes member. Instead, Danette Reilly was introduced into the series.

Firebrand was ranked 67th in Comics Buyer's Guide's "100 Sexiest Women in Comics" list.

=== Alex Sanchez ===
Cover of Firebrand #1, art by Sal Vellutto.

In February 1996, DC introduced a third Firebrand, former police detective Alejandro 'Alex' Sanchez. After nearly dying in an explosion that destroyed his apartment, Sanchez undergoes experimental surgery to restore his mobility. The surgery is paid for by local philanthropist Noah Hightower, who later approaches Sanchez with a special opportunity. Hightower offers Sanchez a suit of advanced armor which, when combined with the implants, gives him enhanced strength and speed for up to four hours. After Sanchez's partner is attacked during an investigation, he agrees to become the superhero Firebrand. In addition to enhanced strength, Sanchez's armor emits green flame, which gives him a demonic appearance.

Sanchez's storyline reflected concerns about racial injustice in America, and violence suffered by people of color.

Sanchez's tenure as Firebrand lasted only nine issues of his self-titled comic. He reappears in JSA: Secret Files #2, where he is killed by a Checkmate knight in Roulette's arena.

=== Andre Twist ===
Firebrand (Andre Twist) in The Battle For Blüdhaven #2 (January 2006), art by Dan Jurgens and Jimmy Palmiotti.

In April 2006, Andre Twist was introduced in The Battle for Blüdhaven. He gains control over fire after his exposure to Chemo being dropped on the city. He also appears in the limited series, Uncle Sam and the Freedom Fighters, as a member of the new Freedom Fighters. Andre carries a bo staff, and has some measure of athletic and martial arts ability.

In the 2007 Freedom Fighters series, Firebrand strikes up a relationship with Red Bee and is distraught when she is taken over by an alien insectoid race. Together, the Freedom Fighters save Red Bee and repel the insectoid's invasion. In the 2010 Freedom Fighters series, Firebrand is killed by Charles Lane, the grandson of the Jester.

=== Janet Fals ===
The fifth Firebrand, Janet Fals, appeared in The Unexpected, released in June 2018.

Janet was a paramedic killed during the Dark Multiverse invasion, but her father used his CIA connections to bring her back to life, releasing her remains to Civil Solutions, a futurist arms developer, who resurrected her with a new heart called the "Conflict Engine". The device requires her to get into a fight at least once ever twenty four hours in order to stay alive, meaning she could not return to her old life or identity. She quenches her needs by fighting in underground matches as Firebrand.

She had a flirtation with Joy, a female receptionist at V.A. Hospital in Mammoth City. Janet Fals/Firebrand's creator Steve Orlando has confirmed that she is a lesbian.

== Powers and abilities ==
An olympic-level athlete and superb hand-to-hand combatant, the Rod Reilly Firebrand possessed no true super-powers, but he was personally trained by ex-heavyweight boxer "Slugger" Dunn to the height of physical perfection.

== In other media ==
- A character based on Danette Reilly / Firebrand appears in the Young Justice episode "Humanity", voiced by Vanessa Marshall. This version is an android codenamed Red Inferno that T. O. Morrow created to infiltrate the Justice Society of America in the 1930s, though she overcame her programming and seemingly died taking an energy blast from Dragon King meant for the Flash. In the present, an android double of Morrow rebuilds Red Inferno and sends her alongside Red Torpedo to capture Red Tornado. However, Red Tornado convinces his fellow androids to stop Red Volcano before he causes the Yellowstone Caldera to erupt. Red Inferno and Torpedo sacrifice themselves to help Red Tornado avert the eruption.
- The Rod Reilly, Danette Reilly, and Alex Sanchez incarnations of Firebrand appear as character summons in Scribblenauts Unmasked: A DC Comics Adventure.
