= Jesús Blasco =

Spanish author and artist of comic books (1919–1995)

- Born: Jesús Monterde Blasco; 3 November 1919 Barcelona, Spain
- Died: 21 October 1995 (aged 75)
- Areas: Writer, Artist
- Notable works: Cuto; Capitán Trueno
- Awards: 1982 Yellow Kid award

Jesús Blasco (3 November 1919 – 21 October 1995) was a Spanish author and artist of comic books, whose career covered most of the conventional history of comic strips. He worked extensively in British comics in the 1960s and 1970s.

== Career ==
Blasco debuted in 1935 in the Spanish magazine Mickey, at the age of fifteen. For the magazine Boliche, however, he created the series and character named Cuto (translation: Cutter). Originally a strip in the vein of Percy Crosby's Skippy, the character became a globe trotting and time-travelling boy adventurer, casually handling firearms and hot wiring sportscars, and romancing adult women.

Blasco's art veered from cute animal cartoons to the shadowplay realism of Milton Caniff and Noel Sickles. He created strips for various audiences, including Anita Diminuta, a girl strip.

His career was interrupted during the Spanish Civil War when he fought on the side of the republicans.

In the 1960s, he landed a deal with Fleetway that brought him continental exposure. In 1968, he co-created the cartoon Los Guerilleros for the Belgian publication Spirou, With the strips Steel Claw and Buffalo Bill, events lead to a collaboration with Pat Mills to create Invasion! in the first issue of 2000AD (1977). The 1970s saw more Alex Toth-esque Westerns such as Tex Willer. Blasco also co-created the strip Capitán Trueno, which has influenced the look of many other Japanese and Euro creations, such as The Mysterious Cities of Gold. Blasco also did fairy tale illustrations and tarrocci cards.

His work is relatively unknown in the United States, with his main exposure being three appearances in Warren Publishing's Creepy, which were all miscredited to other artists.
