= Hercules (comics) =

The mythological hero Hercules or Heracles appears in several comics.

- Hercules (DC Comics), a DC Comics character
- Hercules (Marvel Comics), a Marvel Comics character
- Hercules (Radical Comics), a Radical Comics character
- Hercules, a character in the comic strip Pif le chien
- Hercules, a member of the Marvel Comics team The Order
- Hercules, a comic book by Dell Comics adapting the 1958 film Hercules
  - Hercules Unchained, a comic book by Dell Comics adapting the 1959 film Hercules Unchained
- Hercules, a Topps Comics series based on the television series Hercules: The Legendary Journeys
- Hercules: Adventures of the Man-God, a comic book series by Charlton Comics
- Hercules Algethi, a character in the manga series Saint Seiya
- Joe Hercules, a Quality Comics character who debuted in Hit Comics #1 (July 1940)
- The Mighty Hercules, a comic book series by Gold Key Comics based on the animated television series The Mighty Hercules

== See also ==
- Hercules (disambiguation)
