= Smash Comics =

1939–1949 anthology comic book

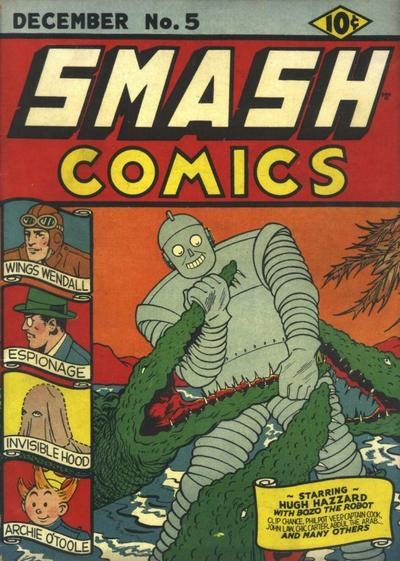
- Smash Comics #5, 1940

Publication information
- Publisher: Quality Comics
- Schedule: Monthly
- Format: Ongoing series
- Genre: Action/adventure, crime, superhero
- Publication date: August 1939 – Nov. 1949
- No. of issues: 85
- Main characters: Ray; Midnight; Invisible Hood; Magno the Magnetic Man; The Jester; Black X Bozo the Iron Man

Smash Comics is the title of an American Golden Age comic book anthology series, published by Quality Comics for 85 issues between 1939 and 1949. It became the series Lady Luck for #86-90 (Dec 1949–Aug 1950).

Smash Comics had the distinction of being the company's first title with exclusively new material. Originally, it starred a variety of superheroes and other crimefighters, including the Ray, Midnight, the Invisible Hood, Magno the Magnetic Man, the Jester, Black X, and the robot Bozo the Iron Man.

The title later came to include a number of syndicated comic strips that had previously been appearing in Feature Comics. About halfway through Smash's run, reprints of the four-page crimefighter feature "Lady Luck" — originally published in the Sunday-newspaper insert colloquially called "The Spirit Section" — also began appearing. Eventually, the Smash Comics title changed names to Lady Luck for its final five issues, #86–90.

The title Smash Comics was used again in 1999 as a part of the DC Comics crossover story arc "Justice Society Returns".
