= Human Bomb =

- The Human Bomb (center) on the cover of Freedom Fighters #1 (April 1976), artist Ernie Chan.

Publication information
- Publisher: Quality Comics, later DC Comics
- First appearance: (Lincoln); Police Comics #1 (August 1941) (Franklin); Crisis Aftermath: The Battle For Blüdhaven #1 (June 2006) (Taylor); Human Bomb #1 (February 2013)
- Created by: (Lincoln); Paul Gustavson (creator) (Franklin); Justin Gray (writer); Jimmy Palmiotti (writer); Dan Jurgens (artist) (Taylor); Justin Gray (writer); Jimmy Palmiotti (writer); Jerry Ordway (artist)

In-story information
- Alter ego: Roy Lincoln; Andy Franklin; Michael Taylor
- Team affiliations: (Lincoln, Franklin); Freedom Fighters (Lincoln); All-Star Squadron; Black Lantern Corps; Justice League (Franklin); S.H.A.D.E. (Taylor); United States Marine Corps
- Abilities: Talented chemist Fine hand to hand combatant Biochemical explosion generation Prolonged lifespan

The Human Bomb is a superhero appearing in American comic books published by DC Comics. He first appeared in Police Comics #1 (August 1941), and was created by writer and artist Paul Gustavson.

== Publication history ==
The Human Bomb was first published by Quality Comics in the 1940s, and decades later by DC Comics after it acquired Quality's characters. Police Comics #1 also featured the first appearances of Plastic Man and the Phantom Lady, among others.

== Fictional character biography ==
=== Roy Lincoln ===
==== Quality Comics ====
Roy Lincoln is originally a scientist working with his father on a special explosive chemical called "27-QRX". When Nazi spies invade his lab and kill his father, he ingests the chemical to prevent it from falling into their hands. As a result, Lincoln gains the ability to cause explosions in any object he touches, particularly through his hands. He can only control his abilities using special asbestos gloves, which were retconned to be "Fibro-wax" gloves after asbestos was discovered to be harmful. Donning a containment suit to prevent accidental explosions, Lincoln becomes the "Human Bomb", removing his gloves only to expose his explosive powers against Nazi and Japanese enemies, as well as ordinary criminals. He also fights the invisible Mr. Chameleon, the pied piper of destruction Herman Stingmayer, and Yarboe, who shares the Human Bomb's explosive ability.

He later gains enough control over his powers to be able to remove the containment suit, though the gloves are always necessary.

In 1943, the Bomb briefly has a comedy sidekick, Hustace Throckmorton, who has similar powers to him but only on the soles of his feet. Following this, Lincoln shares his formula with three friends — Swordo the Sword Swallower, Montague McGurx, and Red Rogers. They become "the Bombardiers", and work behind enemy lines for a few issues targeting Japanese and German soldiers. The Human Bomb drops his new team soon after and returned to the States alone.

A Human Bomb feature continued in Police Comics through issue #58, published in September 1946.

==== DC Comics ====
After Quality Comics went out of business in 1956, DC Comics acquired the rights to the Human Bomb, among other Quality Comics properties. The Human Bomb remained unpublished until he and several other former Quality properties were re-launched in Justice League of America #107 (October 1973) as the Freedom Fighters. As was done with many other characters DC had acquired from other publishers or that were holdovers from Golden Age titles, the Freedom Fighters were located on Earth-X, an alternate universe where Nazi Germany won World War II. The team were featured in their own series for fifteen issues (1976–1978), in which the team temporarily left Earth-X for "Earth-1" (where most DC titles were set). The Human Bomb was then an occasional guest star of All-Star Squadron, a superhero team title that was set on "Earth-2", the locale for DC's WWII-era superheroes, at a time prior to when he and the other Freedom Fighters were supposed to have left for Earth-X.

The character then appeared in Crisis on Infinite Earths, a story that was intended to eliminate the similarly confusing histories that DC had attached to its characters by retroactively merging the various parallel worlds into one. This erased the Human Bomb's Earth-X days and merged the character's All-Star Squadron and Freedom Fighter histories so that the Freedom Fighters were merely a splinter group of the Squadron.

Lincoln was shown as retired and frail in several issues of Damage in the mid-1990s, but appears as the Human Bomb in several issues of JSA in 2003. At the beginning of the Infinite Crisis storyline (2005), he is killed by Bizarro.

Roy is temporarily reanimated as a Black Lantern during the Blackest Night crossover. He and his fellow Black Lantern Freedom Fighters attack the JSA. They mostly target their former teammate Damage, admonishing him for surviving the Society's attack when they did not.

"The New Golden Age" one-shot revealed that Human Bomb had a sidekick named Cherry Bomb who took a recreated version of the formula that gave Human Bomb his powers. Due to it growing dangerous, Human Bomb had Cherry Bomb continue wearing her special containment costume to avoid an unexpected explosion. It was stated that Human Bomb worked on finding a way to cure Cherry Bomb until she mysteriously vanished.

=== Andy Franklin ===
Andy Franklin. Art by Daniel Acuña.

The series Crisis Aftermath: The Battle for Blüdhaven introduces Andy Franklin, a former scientist who was caught in the blast that destroyed Blüdhaven and held for experimentation in the secret internment camps in the remains of the city. In Uncle Sam & the Freedom Fighters #2, Uncle Sam remarks that a drop of Franklin's sweat would be sufficient to level Manhattan. Franklin is highly emotional, and is hurt deeply because his teammates refer to him as a freak because of his destructive powers. He has a higher sense of morality than his teammates, but has shown that he will use lethal force when he sees his friends hurt. Franklin's condition requires him to take special medication developed by S.H.A.D.E., otherwise he will involuntarily explode.

=== Michael Taylor ===
In 2011, "The New 52" rebooted the DC universe. A four-issue mini-series helmed by Battle for Bludhaven creators Justin Gray and Jimmy Palmiotti introduces a new Human Bomb. Michael Taylor is an ex-Marine and veteran who uncovers a plot to use "human bombs" to destroy the United States.

== Powers and abilities ==
Lincoln could generate a biochemical explosion with just a touch. If he increased the kinetic force by hitting the object harder, the explosive force was also increased. Lincoln was also a fine hand-to-hand combatant and a talented chemist. The changes to his body chemistry seemed to have prolonged his life. Lincoln wore from head to toe, a containment suit made of "Fibro wax", which inhibited his biochemical explosive reaction. When he wanted to use his powers, he simply removed his gloves.

== Other versions ==
- The Human Bomb makes a minor appearance in Kingdom Come #2.
- An alternate universe version of Roy Lincoln / Human Bomb from Earth-10 appears in 52 #52. This version comes from a universe that is similar to, yet distinct from, the pre-Crisis Earth-X.
- An alternate universe version of Roy Lincoln / Human Bomb appears in Multiversity: Mastermen. Still a member of the Freedom Fighters, he undertakes a solo mission to sabotage and deorbit the New Reichsmen (Nazi Justice League) satellite the Eagles Eyrie, and effectively does so, killing millions in the Nazi-dominated American city of Metropolis as it impacts there.

== In other media ==
- The Roy Lincoln incarnation of Human Bomb makes a non-speaking appearance in the Batman: The Brave and the Bold episode "Cry Freedom Fighters!".
- The Roy Lincoln incarnation of Human Bomb appears in Justice League Unlimited #17.
