= Jester (Quality Comics) =

Superhero in Quality / DC Comics

The Jester
- The Jester as depicted in Who's Who: The Definitive Directory of the DC Universe #11 (January 1986).

Publication information
- Publisher: Quality Comics; DC Comics
- First appearance: Smash Comics #22 (May 1941)
- Created by: Paul Gustavson

In-story information
- Alter ego: Charles "Chuck" Lane
- Team affiliations: All-Star Squadron; Freedom Fighters; The Arcadians
- Abilities: Olympic-level athlete Brilliant hand-to-hand combatant Skilled detective

Jester (Charles "Chuck" Lane) is a character, a Golden Age superhero created by Paul Gustavson and published by Quality Comics.

== Publication history ==
The Jester first appeared in Smash Comics #22 (May 1941). Like most of Quality's characters, the Jester was later purchased by DC Comics and incorporated into their universe. Though little used by the company, he appeared in All-Star Squadron #31 and #60 and Starman #46. The character's last Golden Age appearance was in Smash Comics #85 (Oct 1949).

== Fictional character biography ==
Rookie cop Chuck Lane learns that he is a direct descendant of a medieval court jester. Because of this, and the fact that he feels he is not doing enough good as a cop alone, he becomes a colorfully costumed adventurer known as the "Jester". The Jester is a comical crime fighter who makes laughing-stocks out of the criminals he fights. He is known to be an unpredictable hero whose eerie laugh and jingling bells are an ominous sign to his enemies. His costume is worn under his police uniform.

According to Jess Nevins' Encyclopedia of Golden Age Superheroes, "most of the Jester's enemies are ordinary humans, but there is the occasional name villain like the stoic gangster Stoneface and the femme fatale Lady Satan".

The Jester becomes a member of both the All-Star Squadron and Uncle Sam's Freedom Fighters. His last recorded mission is in 1952, and sometime after that he gives up being the Jester to become a normal cop again.

In modern times, the aged Lane is the head of The Arcadians, a group of patriotic radicals seeking to "cleanse" America of its "corrupt" governments. To this end, he has his underlings (among whom is his grandson who has taken on the Jester identity) kidnap the Vice President and his wife, with the ransom being the recovering of mystical artifacts by the Freedom Fighters. When government agents track the group's communications to his home, Lane sets off powerful explosives, killing the agents and himself along with them.

== Powers and abilities ==
The Jester is an Olympic-level athlete and a skilled hand-to-hand combatant and detective. In later appearances, he possesses a small flying sphere with a smiling face and handles on the side called "Quinopolis".

== Other versions ==
An alternate universe equivalent of the Jester, initially known as the Jokester, is the heroic doppelgänger of the Joker.

== In other media ==
An alternate universe variant of the Jester appears in Justice League: Crisis on Two Earths, voiced by James Patrick Stuart. This version is a heroic doppelgänger of the Joker and an ally of Lex Luthor.
