= Military Comics =

Comic book

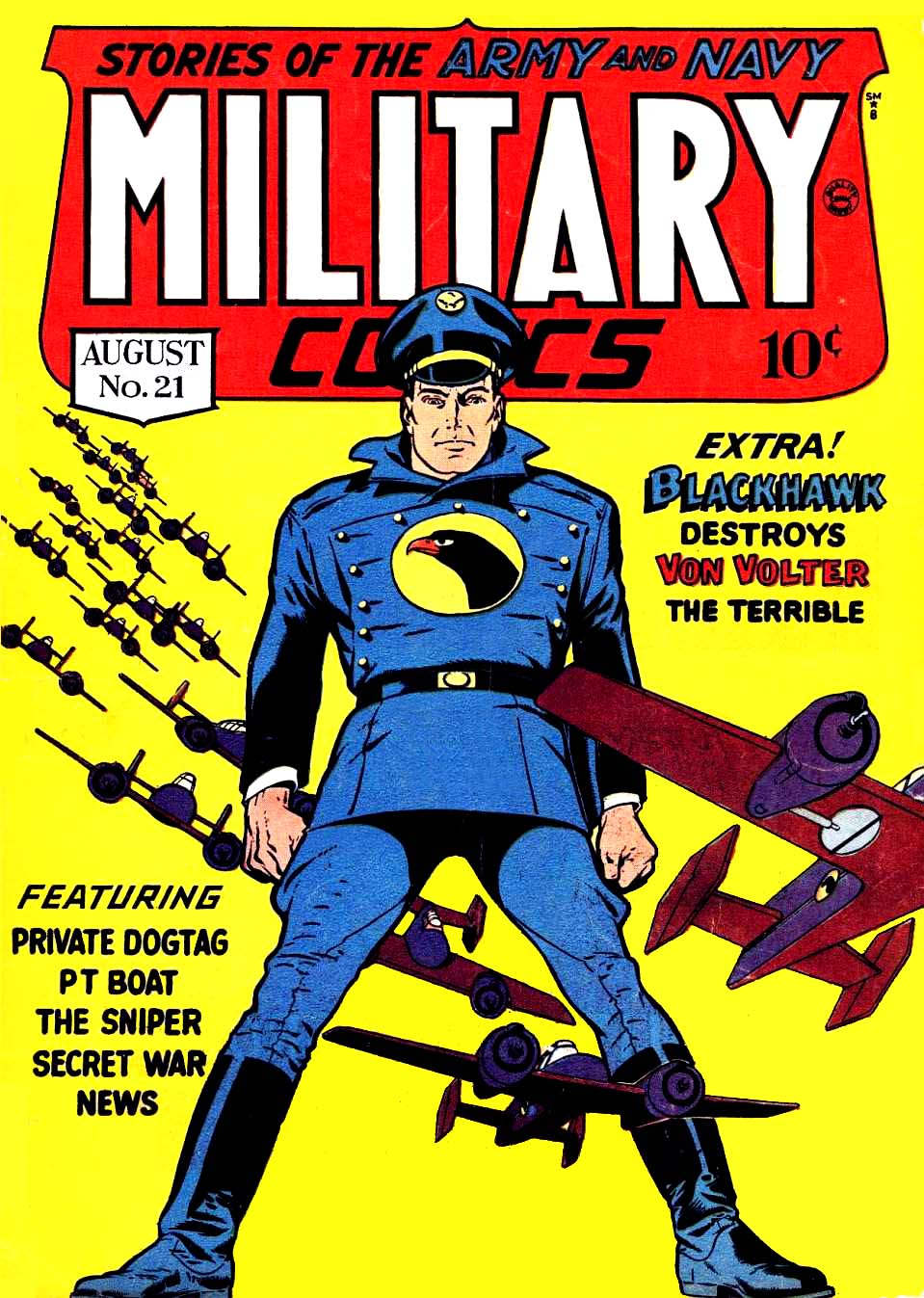

Publication information
- Publisher: Quality Comics
- Schedule: Monthly
- Format: Standard
- Publication date: August 1941 – October 1945
- No. of issues: 43
- Main character(s): Blackhawk; Blue Tracer; Miss America

Military Comics, later Modern Comics, was a comic book anthology title published by Quality Comics during the Golden Age of Comic Books from 1941 until 1950. The first issue of Military Comics is notable for featuring the debut of Blackhawk, Blue Tracer, and Miss America.

With issue #44 (Nov. 1945), the title of the series was changed to Modern Comics. The series ended with issue #102 (Oct. 1950).

Creators involved with the title include Reed Crandall, Chuck Cuidera, Everett M. "Busy" Arnold, Klaus Nordling, Bob Powell, Fred Guardineer, Elmer Wexler, and Al McWilliams.
