= Red Bee (character) =

- The Jenna Raleigh incarnation of Red Bee as depicted in Uncle Sam and the Freedom Fighters #5 (January 2007). Art by Daniel Acuña.

Publication information
- Publisher: DC Comics
- First appearance: (Rick); Hit Comics #1 (July 1940) (Jenna); Uncle Sam and the Freedom Fighters #5 (January 2007)
- Created by: Toni Blum; Charles Nicholas

In-story information
- Alter ego: Richard Raleigh; Jenna Raleigh
- Species: (Richard Raleigh); Human (Jenna Raleigh); Bee/human hybrid
- Team affiliations: (Rick); All-Star Squadron (Both); Freedom Fighters
- Abilities: (Rick); Carries a special "Stinger Gun"; Use of trained bees (Jenna); Uses robotic bees which fire electricity blasts Wields mechanized battle suit that grants enhanced strength and flight Formerly: Human/insect biology that grants enhanced physical attributes and tracking abilities

Red Bee is the name of two superheroes appearing in American comic books.

The first Red Bee debuted in Hit Comics #1, published in July 1940 by Quality Comics. The character was obtained by DC Comics in 1956 and has since fallen into public domain.

The second, written as the grandniece or granddaughter of the original, first appeared in Uncle Sam and the Freedom Fighters #5.

== Fictional character biography ==
=== Richard Raleigh ===
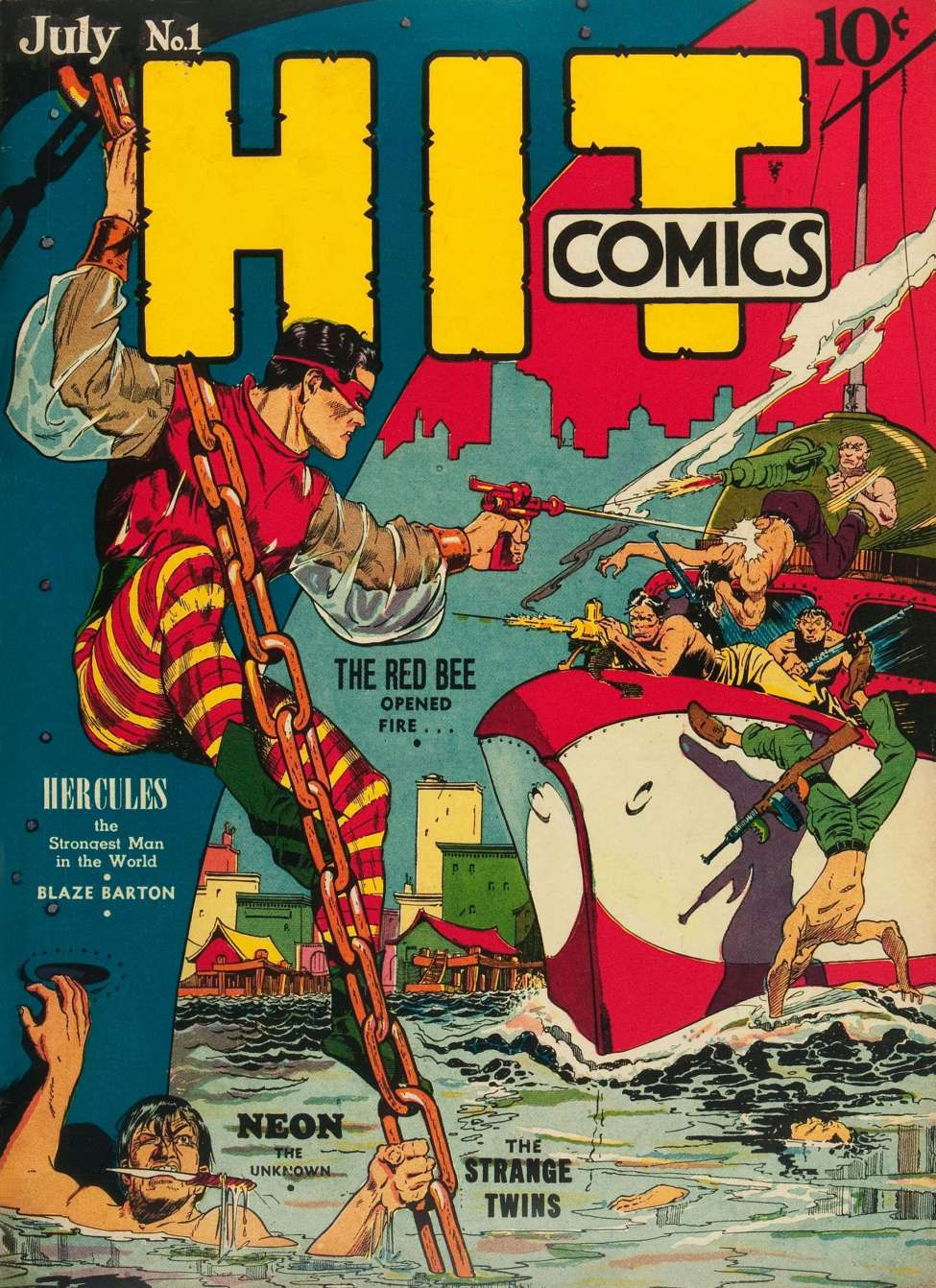
Cover to Hit Comics #1 (July 1940).

The Red Bee's secret identity is Rick Raleigh, assistant district attorney in Superior City, Oregon. As Red Bee, he utilizes trained bees and a "stinger gun". His favorite bee is named Michael and lives inside his belt buckle for use in special circumstances. He has a series of adventures which lasts until issue #24 (Oct 1942).

According to Jess Nevins' Encyclopedia of Golden Age Superheroes, "he fights enemies like the evil spiritualist Dr. Marah, the Swordsmen (who use electrified swords), and Yellow Peril hatchet men".

Red Bee proved to be unpopular and was largely forgotten before reappearing in DC Comics' All-Star Squadron. This series reveals that Red Bee had been killed by Baron Blitzkrieg in battle. The Freedom Fighters was formed out of the Squadron, with Red Bee being made an honorary member.

"The New Golden Age" storyline retroactively reveals that Red Bee had a sidekick named Ladybug. Ladybug was kidnapped by Childminder before being rescued by Stargirl and Hourman and transported to the present day.

=== Jenna Raleigh ===
Rick's grandniece Jenna becomes the second Red Bee, using a mechanized battle suit and two robotic bees that can fire electricity. She assists the group in fighting S.H.A.D.E., an evil governmental organization. She soon learns that the leader of the Freedom Fighters, Uncle Sam, has assisted with the development of her technology. She decides to stay and fight with the group.

Over the course of Uncle Sam and the Freedom Fighters vol. 2 (2007), Jenna is mutated by an alien insect colony into a human/bee hybrid. Her mind is later completely overtaken by her mutation. After trying to colonize Earth, she is cured of her affliction by Ray, returning her to her human form. Jenna retires as a hero to continue work in the research field.

== Powers and abilities ==
Richard Raleigh had no superpowers but carried a special "Stinger Gun" and he specialized in the use of trained bees.

Jenna Raleigh possesses a human/insect biology which grants her enhanced physical attributes (i.e. superhuman strength), pheromone production, and the ability to "mark" people for later tracking.

Jenna formerly wore a mechanized battle suit which granted her enhanced strength, flight, and used two large robotic bees that could fire electricity blasts.

== Reception ==
In American Comic Book Chronicles: 1940-1944, comics historian Kurt Mitchell calls the Golden Age strip "inane", and describes it in a dismissive way: "... a masked mystery-man aided by the trained bees he stored in his belt buckle. No, that's not a typo. Bees. Trained bees. In his belt buckle".

== In other media ==
The Richard Raleigh and Jenna Raleigh incarnations of Red Bee appear as character summons in Scribblenauts Unmasked: A DC Comics Adventure.

Richard Raleigh makes a notable appearance in the 2023 DC Black Label six-issue mini-series Peacemaker Tries Hard!
