= Silver Streak (character) =

Fictional superhero character

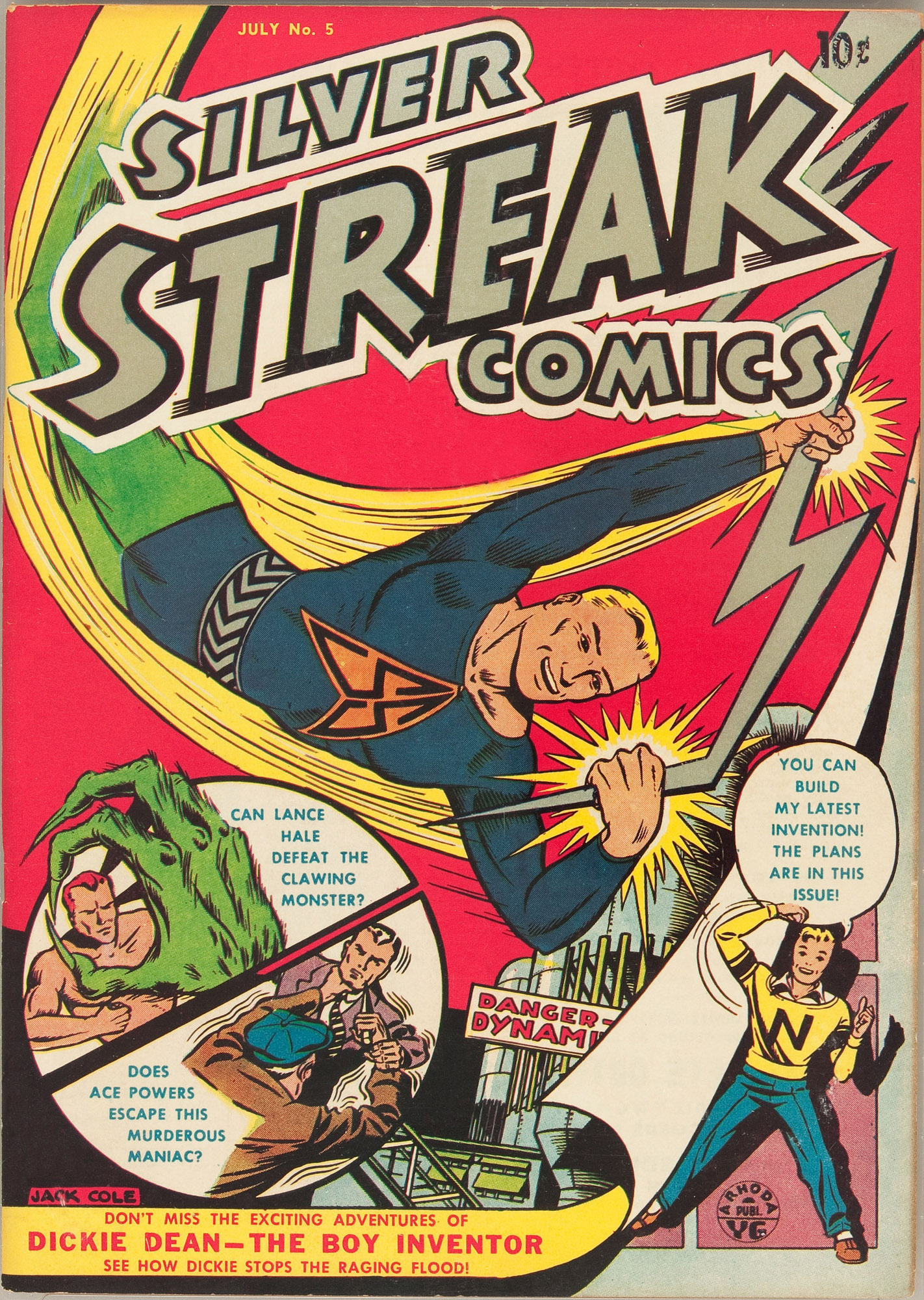
- Cover of Silver Streak Comics #5 (July 1940), art by Jack Cole.

Publication information
- Publisher: Lev Gleason Publications
- First appearance: Silver Streak Comics #3 (March 1940)
- Created by: Joe Simon (writer); Jack Binder (artist)

In-story information
- Partnerships: Meteor, Whiz (falcon)
- Abilities: Super-speed; Flight
Silver Streak Comics
Publication information
- Publisher: Rhoda Publications; Lev Gleason Publications
- Schedule: Monthly; bimonthly
- Format: Ongoing series
- Genre: Superhero, adventure
- Publication date: Dec. 1939 – Nov. 1946
- No. of issues: 23
- Main character(s): Silver Streak; Daredevil; The Claw; Captain Battle; Dickie Dean; Lance Hale; Pirate Prince
Creative team
- Written by: Otto Binder
- Artist(s): Jack Binder, Dick Briefer, Jack Cole, Don Rico, Bob Wood
- Editor: Lev Gleason

Silver Streak is a superhero created by Joe Simon that first appeared in Silver Streak Comics #3 (cover-dated March 1940), from Lev Gleason Publications. He is believed to be the second-ever comic book superhero whose primary power is speed; All-American Publications' The Flash preceded him by two months. However, Silver Streak beat out National Allied Publications' Johnny Quick (who debuted in 1941) as the first superhero whose two powers were speed and flight. Silver Streak has a kid sidekick called "Mercury" (soon changed to "Meteor"); he is also assisted by a falcon named "Whiz".

== Publication history ==
Silver Streak Comics was originally published by Arthur Bernhardt's Rhoda Publications, and the title was inspired by Bernhardt's car, a Pontiac Silver Streak. With issue #3, the title was taken over by Lev Gleason Publications and Silver Streak himself first appeared. Silver Streak appeared in Silver Streak Comics until issue #19 (March 1942); the title itself ended with #21, and was renamed Crime Does Not Pay. Also during this run, Silver Streak appeared in Lev Gleason's Daredevil #1.

In 1945, Silver Streak appeared in the only issue of Dime Comics, and in 1946 he appeared in the 22nd and 23rd final issues of the briefly revived Silver Streak Comics. Since then, the character has fallen into the public domain. In the mid-1980s, Roy Thomas featured the "Scarlet Streak" in his limited series Alter Ego.

In 2008, he appeared in issue #141 of The Savage Dragon, along with a score of other Golden Age heroes. Also in 2008, Silver Streak appeared in flashbacks in issue #0 of Dynamite Entertainment's Project Superpowers, a title that uses mostly public domain Golden Age characters. In the one-shot Project Superpowers: Chapter Two Prelude. He later appeared in the related Dynamite miniseries The Death-Defying ’Devil. Editor Erik Larsen's "Next Issue Project" (Image Comics) published Silver Streak Comics "#24" (Dec. 2009), featuring Silver Streak in one story, written and illustrated by Paul Grist.

== Fictional biography ==
=== Lev Gleason Publications ===
In Supermen! The First Wave of Comic Book Heroes, Greg Sadowski says that "Silver Streak's origin... is one of the most contrived and convoluted stories of the early golden age, and that's saying something". In 1940, a taxicab driver (name unknown) applied for a position as a race car driver (all of the previous drivers of the "Silver Streak" having been killed by a giant fly sent by a mad scientist named Dr. Katan) and was hypnotized by a mysterious swami (name unknown) into believing: "You are the Silver Streak—the strongest, bravest, fastest man in the world". The cab driver was apparently killed in a crash caused by the fly and was buried, but the swami believed it was "merely a hypnotic trance" and used his mystical powers to bring him back to life, after which the swami declared: "It is as I feared, the hypnosis has become part of his mind... he is now all-powerful, a man to be feared!" Motivated by a strong desire to make the world a better place, he donned a colorful costume and fought against crime, Nazi spies, and The Claw, calling himself "Silver Streak". He changed costumes a few times over the years, but one detail that remained constant was the arrowhead-shaped emblem on his chest with the shape-fitting "SS" inside it; Don Markstein emphasized that the Silver Streak's costume "didn't contain a single silver-colored thread".

He later learned that anyone who receives a transfusion of his blood gains super-speed when a sheik steals it to inject a pet falcon (given the name "Whiz" in the next issue) who immediately gained speed and kinship with the Silver Streak, and to Mickey O'Toole, a kid sidekick initially called "Mercury" but who quickly became "Meteor".

In Silver Streak Comics #5 (July 1940), Jack Cole, who by this time was writing and drawing the character's adventures, directly addressed the readers and explained the hero's motivations:

"His purpose in life is to help others — to help those in need. Silver Streak does his best to make this world an ideal place to live in — a world in which you and I will have the things we most desire.

And he is out to get those forces that stand in the way of his ideals. He fights hard!! He is strong because he is right—he is fast because he needs speed to conquer his enemies.

Silver Streak is my hero, and I hope he is your hero, too, for he does the things that you and I would do if we had his powers!"

The Streak wears a ring emblazoned with a "V" for Victory; in one story, he rescues Mercury from the Nazis, and punches Adolf Hitler in the face, leaving a "V" mark on the dictator's face.

=== Project Superpowers ===
At some point after World War II, Silver Streak and other heroes were imprisoned in the mystical Urn of Pandora by the misguided Fighting Yank. Decades later the Urn was broken and the heroes released; Silver Streak emerged (wearing a red and silver costume similar to his original one) just in time to aid his former ally The Death-Defying ’Devil against a terrorist attack. Exactly what part this hero will play in the modern world remains to be seen.

=== Living Legends ===
The Metahuman Press serial Living Legends has introduced a new version of Silver Streak. This character is an Asian female, native to the fictional city of Riccapoor, home of The Claw.
