= Harry "A" Chesler =

Publisher

- Chesler in undated photo
- Born: Harry Chesler; January 12, 1897 or January 12, 1898 (sources differ) Kaunas, Vilna Governorate or Jersey City, New Jersey, U.S. (sources differ)
- Died: December 29, 1981 Succasunna, New Jersey, U.S.
- Areas: Editor, Publisher

Harry Chesler (January 12, 1897, or January 12, 1898 (sources differ) – December 29, 1981), often credited as Harry "A" Chesler, with the "A" an affectation rather than a true initial, was the entrepreneur behind the first comic book packager of the late-1930s to 1940s Golden Age of comic books, supplying comics features and complete comic books to publishers testing the waters of the emerging medium.

Chesler's studio, which began in either 1935 or 1936, provided early work to artists and writers including Jack Cole, Jack Binder, Otto Binder, Charles Biro, Mort Meskin, and many others.

== Biography ==
=== Early life and career ===
Chesler was born either in Kaunas, Vilna Governorate on January 12, 1897, or, as given by his United States Social Security data, on January 12, 1898, in Jersey City, New Jersey. One source gives his birth name as Aaron Czesler, nicknamed Ari, the phonetic equivalent of Harry. That source says his parents, who were Jewish, married in 1895 and had two other children, Lena (b. 1896) and Sadie (b. 1900); the family immigrated to the U.S. in 1903, changing their name to Chesler.

Most often credited as Harry "A" Chesler — the "A" was an affectation rather than a true initial, and Chesler sometimes quipped it stood for "anything" — Chesler grew up in East Orange, New Jersey where he graduated from East Orange High School in June 1915. He worked in his father's grocery and in the furniture business. He moved with his family to The Bronx, New York City in 1917. There his father bought a grocery wholesale firm at 1493 Zerega Avenue, with the family living nearby at 2903 Lyon Avenue. Harry Chesler registered for the draft on September 12, 1918, and served as a U.S. Army private during World War I.

In 1919, after his discharge, Chesler returned to New Jersey, where he sold ads for The Jersey Journal and lived at 1463 East 100th Street in Jersey City. He also worked for a time at the Philadelphia Public Ledger, where he picked up his fictitious middle initial. By April 1923, he owned the outdoor advertising firm the Harry "A" Chesler Company of 15 Beecher Street in Newark, New Jersey. In 1928, he bought a 90-acre summer-home property in the Succasunna section of Roxbury Township, New Jersey, and opened a side-business dairy store. He would later live in Succasunna full-time.

=== Publishing career ===
In 1935 (Note: Saunders, without citation of original source, quotes Chesler saying, "I moved into the comics business in New York in 1935. My first space was at Fifth Avenue and 32nd Street. I commuted from New Jersey for $6.45 a week. We put out a sixty-four page, four-color, comic book that sold for ten cents. In those days, paper was forty to fifty dollars a ton. I paid about a thousand dollars for the four-color plates for sixty-four pages. At one time, there were forty artists working for me.") or 1936, Chesler established a studio in Manhattan to supply comic-book content to publishers testing the waters of the emerging medium. The "Chesler shop", as it was informally called, was the first such "packager", later to be followed by companies including Eisner & Iger and Funnies Inc. Chesler in 1976 recalled it was located first at Fifth Avenue and 32nd Street, and later at Seventh Avenue and 23rd Street. George Tuska, a comic-book artist who had worked for Chesler in the late 1930s, recalled, "Chelser had his office on the fourth floor of a building on 23rd Street between Sixth and Seventh Avenue[s]". (One source lists the studio at 28th Street and Fifth Avenue.) During this time, Chesler commuted from his home in Dover, New Jersey.

Chesler's early publications Star Comics and Star Ranger were produced through his own Chesler Publications, Inc. These were bought by Ultem Publications in 1937, where he continued as editor until Ultem was in turn bought by Centaur Publications in 1938. By the late 1930s, Chesler's packaging business was flourishing. As Tuska recalled, Chesler "did alright with comics. Bought a lot of property in Jersey. Made his own lake".

Chesler employees remembered him as a tough but warm boss who always wore a hat and smoked a big cigar. Artist Joe Kubert recalled Chesler paying him $5 a week, at age 12 (c. 1938) to apprentice at his studio after school. Similarly, artist Carmine Infantino remembers that, c. 1940, he was paid by Chesler "a dollar a day, just [to] study art, learn, and grow. That was damn nice of him, I thought. He did that for me for a whole summer" while Infantino was in high school.

Chesler's later imprints included Dynamic Publications, Harry "A" Chesler Jr. Publications, and Harry "A." Chesler Feature Jr. Syndicate. The covers of many of his 1940s comics bear the phrase "Harry 'A' Chesler Jr. Features Syndicate, N.Y.". or "Harry 'A' Chesler, Jr. World's Greatest Comics". Comic-book historians sometimes label all such imprints informally "Harry A Chesler Comics." In his heyday, Chesler recalled in a 1976 profile, "besides about 75 of my own titles, we produced comics for some 50 different publishers. At one time, there were 40 artists working for me and I had 300 comic titles on the newsstands." However, the Grand Comics Database records only 19 distinct titles directly published by Chesler between 1937 and 1946, leaving the meaning of "my own titles" in this quote unclear.

His shop employed "a growing group of men who produced scores of strips [and] entire books (often first issues) for nearly every publisher," including Chesler's own Star Comics, Star Ranger, Dynamic Comics, Punch Comics and Yankee Comics. The studio also "[p]roduced the early issues of MLJ Publications Zip Comics, Pep Comics and Top-Notch Comics, Captain Marvel, Master Comics," as well as features for Centaur Comics. Alumni of the Chesler Shop "went on to form the nuclei of various comics art staffs" for a number of different early comics companies; they include Jack Cole, Jack Binder, Otto Binder, Charles Biro, Mort Meskin, Creig Flessel (briefly), Ken Ernst, Bob McCay, Otto Eppers, and many others.

Chesler's comics enterprise was severely affected by World War II. Chesler's main pre-war editor, Phil Sturm, was on active duty for most of the war, severely curtailing the company's ability to produce comics. Chesler's son, Harry A. Chesler, Jr., although listed in the business records as a co-owner in name, was never involved in the publishing business. Evidence from Chesler publications' statements of ownership during the war indicate that Chesler, Jr. was "on leave to the US Army."

Chesler was briefly a partner with Archer St. John in St. John Publications in 1953.

The studio was active through 1940, after which it reorganized and ran through at least 1953, though a former Marvel Comics editor-in-chief said in 1981 that from c. 1971–1975, the Chesler studio produced material for the Marvel Comics line of black-and-white magazines.

== Personal life ==
Chesler married Hannah "Betty" Northay (b. 1897; d. October 16, 1977) on January 4, 1921, with the couple taking up residence at 165 Park Avenue in East Orange, New Jersey. They had two children, sons Harry A. Chesler Jr. (b. December 9, 1921) and Arthur Bernard Chesler (b. January 26, 1923).

In 1976 Chesler donated over 4,000 pieces of original comic book and comic strip art, much of it dating from the turn of the 20th century, to Fairleigh Dickinson University's Friendship Library. He died in December 1981, still living in Succasunna.

== Titles published ==
Chesler Publications / Dynamic Publications / Harry "A" Chesler Jr. Publications and related companies

Chesler Publications, Inc., 276 Fifth Avenue, New York City, New York
Dynamic Publications, 163 23rd Street, New York City, New York
Harry A. Chesler Jr. Publications, Inc., 163 23rd Street, New York City, New York

- Bulls Eye Comics #11 (1944)
- Captain Battle Comics #3 (Winter 1942; numbering continued from Lev Gleason Publications' Captain Battle Comics #2; continued as Picture Scoop's Captain Battle Comics #5 [no issue #4 published])
- Carnival Comics [no number] (1945; numbering continues from Kayo Comics; continued as Red Seal Comics)
- Cocomalt Book of Comics #! (1938; one-shot giveaway)
- Dynamic Comics #1-3, 8-20 (Oct. 1941 - Oct. 1946; no issues #4-7; continued as Superior Publishers Limited's Dynamic Comics)
- Jest Comics #10-11 (c. 1944–1945; numbering continued from Snap Comics; continued as Kayo Comics)
- Kayo Komics #12 (March 1945; numbering continues from Jest Comics; continued as Carnival Comics)
- Komik Pages #1/10 (#1 in postal indicia, #10 on cover; April 1945)
- Major Victory Comics #1-3 (1944 - Summer 1945)
- Punch Comics #1-2, 9-19 (Dec. 1941 - Oct. 1946; continued as Superior Publishers Limited's Punch Comics)
- Red Seal Comics #14-18 (Oct. 1945 - Oct. 1946); numbering continued from Carnival Comics; continued as Superior Publishers Limited's Red Seal Comics
- Scoop Comics #1-3 (Nov. 1941 - March 1942; continued as Remington Morse's Yankee Comics), #8 (1944; continued as Snap Comics; no issues #4-7)
- Skyrocket Comics [no number] (c. 1944)
- Snap Comics #9 (1944; numbering continued from Scoop Comics; continued as Jest Comics
- Spotlight Comics #1-3 (Nov. 1944 - March 1945)
- Star Comics #1-6 (Feb.-Sept. 1937; continued as Ultem's Star Comics)
- Star Ranger #1-6 (Feb.-Sept. 1937; continued as Ultem's Star Ranger)
- Yankee Comics #1-4 (Sept, 1941 - March 1942)

=== Erroneously attributed to Chesler ===
- Feature Funnies #1-20 (1937–1939); actually published by Quality Comics and subsequently continued as Feature Comics #21-144 by that publisher

== Chesler/Dynamic characters ==
- Alias the Dragon
- Black Dwarf
- Dynamic Boy
- Dynamic Man
- Green Knight
- Lady Satan
- Major Victory
- Master Key
- Mister E
- Rocketboy
- Rocketgirl
- Rocketman
- Scarlet Sentry
- Spider Woman (Chesler version)
- Veiled Avenger
- Wonder Boy (Chesler version)
- Yankee Girl

== See also ==
- Eisner & Iger
- Everett M. "Busy" Arnold
- Funnies Inc.
