= Don Rico =

American writer and comic book creator (1912-1985)

- Don Rico circa 1942
- Born: Donato Francisco Rico II; September 26, 1912 Rochester, New York, U.S.
- Died: March 27, 1985 (aged 72) Los Angeles, California, U.S.
- Areas: Writer, Penciller
- Pseudonyms: Dan Rico; Donella St. Michaels; Donna Richards; Joseph Milton; N. Korok
- Notable works: Jann of the Jungle; Lorna the Jungle Queen; Daredevil (1940s)

Donato "Don" Francisco Rico II (/ˈriːkoʊ/; September 26, 1912 – March 27, 1985) was an American paperback novelist, screenwriter, wood engraver and comic book writer-artist, who co-created the Marvel Comics characters the Black Widow (Natasha Romanova) with plotter Stan Lee and artist Don Heck; Jann of the Jungle with artist Arthur Peddy; Leopard Girl with artist Al Hartley; and Lorna the Jungle Girl with an artist generally considered to be Werner Roth. His pen names include Dan Rico, Donella St. Michaels, Donna Richards, Joseph Milton, and N. Korok.

== Biography ==
=== Early life and career ===
Don Rico was born in Rochester, New York, the eldest of nine children. His parents were emigrants from Italy: Father Alessandro was a shoe designer from Celano, Abruzzi, and mother Josephine was from the Basilicata region. At age 12, Rico received a scholarship to study drawing at the Memorial Art Gallery of the University of Rochester. The following year, his family moved to The Bronx, New York City.

At 16, under artist H. J. Glintenkamp, Rico learned to make wood engravings. Prints of his engravings of Depression-era life for the W.P.A. Federal Art Project in the mid-to-late 1930s, under the supervision of Lynd Ward would eventually become part of the permanent collections of the Metropolitan Museum of Art, The Library of Congress, the New York Public Library, and elsewhere.

He began his comics career in 1939, during the period fans and historians call the Golden Age of Comic Books, beginning at Victor A. Fox's Fox Publications. There he penciled and inked the six-page "Flick Falcon" feature in Fantastic Comics #1 (Dec. 1939). He continued on that feature through issue #8 (July 1940 ), by which time the hero's name and the feature's title had been changed to "Flip Falcon". He drew the features "Blast Bennett" and "Sorceress of Zoom" for Fox's Weird Comics, and did stories for Fiction House's Planet Comics and Fight Comics. Beginning with Silver Streak Comics #11 (June 1941), he worked on some of the earliest stories of Lev Gleason Publications' 1940s superhero Daredevil (unrelated to Marvel Comics' Daredevil), helping lay the foundation for a character that would go on to a celebrated run in his own title under Charles Biro.

Leopard Girl, created by Rico and artist Al Hartley, for Atlas Comics, the 1950s forerunner of Marvel Comics. Cover detail, Jungle Action #2 (Dec. 1954), art by Joe Maneely.

His first story for Timely Comics, a forerunner of Marvel Comics, was an eight-page backup feature starring a hero called the Secret Stamp in Captain America Comics #13 (April 1942); another, uncredited adventure of the Secret Stamp was published in U.S.A. Comics #7 (Feb. 1943). Other early work for the company included a story of the superhero the Terror and co-creating, with an unknown writer, the obscure Jekyll-and-Hyde-like feature "Gary Gaunt", both in Mystic Comics #9 (May 1942). After inking Al Avison on a Captain America story in All Winners Comics #5 (Summer 1942), Rico soon became one of the regular pencilers for that cornerstone hero of the publisher's, starting with the 16-page "The Mikado's Super Shell" in Captain America Comics #18 (Sept. 1942). By the following year, Rico was variously writing/drawing stories featuring such characters as the Human Torch, the Whizzer, the Destroyer, the Blonde Phantom, Venus, and the Young Allies.

Timely artist Allen Bellman recalled in 2005, "Don and some of the other artists didn't bother with [artist] Syd Shores, who was the unofficial bullpen director. Rico was the ringleader of this 'ignore Shores' group. He was always causing small problems in the office and publisher [Martin] Goodman knew this, and hence the name 'Rat Rico' he referred to Don with." Artist Gil Kane recalled that, "Timely was my second job after MLJ. ... Stan [Lee] was the editor at 19 years old but all the day-to-day managing of the work was done by Don Rico, who also did most of the hiring and firing."

Other credits during the 1940s include Fawcett Publications' America's Greatest Comics and Bulletman; MLJ's Black Hood Comics and the dual-hero Shield-Wizard Comics; Lev Gleason's Captain Battle and Captain Battle Junior; Quality Comics' National Comics, and Smash Comics; and Et-Es-Go Magazines' Terrific Comics. From 1946 to 1948, he worked primarily for Novelty Press, on that publisher's Blue Bolt Comics and Target Comics.

=== 1950s ===
In 1949, Rico began working again for Timely Comics as a writer-editor as the company was transitioning to become Marvel's 1950s predecessor, Atlas Comics. Around this time, he became one of at least five staff writers (officially titled editors) there under editor-in-chief Stan Lee, along with Hank Chapman, Ernie Hart, Paul S. Newman, Carl Wessler, and, doing teen-humor comics, future Mad cartoonist Al Jaffee. Among the Atlas titles for which Rico wrote are the horror comics series Adventures into Terror, Astonishing, Marvel Tales, Suspense and Strange Tales. He co-created Jann of the Jungle with artist Jay Scott Pike in Jungle Tales #1 (Sept. 1954), and co-created Leopard Girl with artist Al Hartley in Jungle Action #1 (Oct. 1954), and wrote virtually every story and feature in those two titles. Marvel Comics reprinted several of his jungle stories in the 1970s. Rico briefly returned to comic art as an illustrator on the Atlas series Bible Tales for Young Folk. His last published story for Atlas was the four-page anthological Western tale "The Bushwhacker", with artist Angelo Torres, in Rawhide Kid #16 (Sept. 1957).

In 1958, Rico moved to Los Angeles, where he began writing for film and television.

Splash page, Tales of Suspense #53 (Jan. 1964), scripted by Rico as "N. Korok"

=== 1960s ===
In California, Rico began writing paperback novels, eventually penning more than 60 for a variety of publishers including Lancer Books and Paperback Library. His pseudonyms included Donna Richards, Joseph Milton, and Donella St. Michaels.

Rico wrote only thrice for Marvel during the Silver Age of Comics in the 1960s, with a Doctor Strange story in Strange Tales #129 (Feb. 1965), and scripting two Iron Man plots by Stan Lee in Tales of Suspense #52–53 (April–May 1964), the former introducing the Black Widow. On both, he used the pseudonym N. Korok, later explaining he hadn't wanted his paperback-book publisher to know he was taking on lower-paying comic-book work.

=== Later career ===
Rico co-wrote, with Don Henderson, the story basis for the bisexual-vampiress horror movie Mary, Mary, Bloody Mary (U.S.-Mexico, 1975), by director Juan Lopez Moctezuma and scripter Malcolm Marmorstein. He also drew movie and television production illustrations, including two years at Hanna-Barbera Productions drawing storyboards for TV shows.

In 1977, Rico, Sergio Aragones, and television and comic-book writer Mark Evanier co-founded the Comic Art Professional Society (CAPS). Rico also worked with Aragones as scripter for the artist-plotter's female-detective strip "T.C. Mars" in Joe Kubert's magazine Sojourn. Also in 1977, Rico drew a six-page chapter starring Captain America in the World War II-superhero flashback series The Invaders Annual #1. In 1977, Rico drew the cover and wrote an introduction for a 128-page anthology of black-and-white reprints, The Magnificent Superheroes of Comics [sic] Golden Age #1 (Vintage Features).

During the mid-1970, Rico taught a college course on comic books at UCLA, titled "The Theory, History and Technique of Comic Books". In the early 1980s, he taught drawing at Cal State Northridge.

=== Death ===
Rico lived in Los Angeles at the time of his death in 1985. He was survived by his second wife, Michele Hart-Rico; his son, Donato "Buz" Rico III; and his daughter, Dianne Marie Rico Tran (1933–2007).

== Awards ==
- Inkpot Award at the 1976 Comic-Con International in San Diego.
- The Comic Art Professional Society - CAPS presents the Don Rico Award, named in his honor that is awarded for an organization member who goes above and beyond to support CAPS.
- In 2022, Rico was chosen as one of two winners of the Bill Finger Award for Excellence in Comic Book Writing.

== Bibliography ==
Paperback novels

- Nikki (Midwood Books, 1963)
- The Unmarried Ones (Beacon Signal Sixty, 1964)
- The Sad Gay Life (Lancer Books imprint Domino Books, 1964; under pseudonym Donna Richards)
- The Odd World (Domino Books, 1965; under pseudonym Donna Richards)
- The Last of the Breed (Lancer/Magnum, 1965)
- The Big Blue Death (Lancer Books, 1965; under publishing-house pseudonym Joseph Milton)
- Lorelei (Belmont Books, 1966)
- The Prisoner (Lancer Books, 1966; under pseudonym Donella St. Michaels)
- The Girls of Sunset (Lancer Books, 1966)
- Counterspy (Lancer Books, 1966)
- Nightmare of Eyes (Lancer Books, 1967)
- The Man From Pansy (Lancer Books, 1967; Buzz Cardigan series)
- The Daisy Dilemma (Lancer Books, 1967; Buzz Cardigan series)
- The Passion Flower Puzzle (Lancer Books, 1968, Buzz Cardigan series)
- Casey Grant Caper #1: The Ring-A-Ding Girl (Paperback Library, 1969)
- Casey Grant Caper #2: the Swinging Virgin (Paperback Library, 1969)
- Casey Grant Caper #3: So Sweet, So Deadly (Paperback Library, 1970)
- The House of Girls (New English Library, 1969)

Other work

- Copyright: How to Register Your Copyright and Introduction to New and Historical Copyright Law by Walter E. Hurst, illustrated by Don Rico (Seven Arts Press, 1977)
