= Crimebuster (Boy Comics) =

Comic book hero

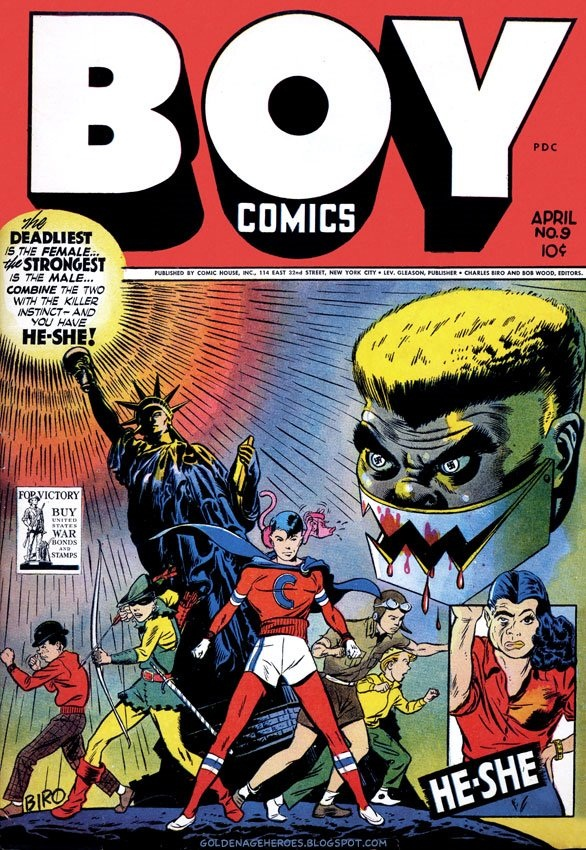
- Boy Comics #9, featuring Crimebuster and Iron Jaw along with other characters appearing in the publication; art by Charles Biro

Publication information
- Publisher: Lev Gleason Image comics
- First appearance: Boy Comics #3 (April 1942)
- Created by: Charles Biro, Bob Wood

In-story information
- Alter ego: Chuck Chandler
- Abilities: military cadet training

Crimebuster (Chuck Chandler) is a fictional boy hero, appearing as the lead feature in Boy Comics in the 1940s and 1950s. Dressed in a hockey uniform and cape, and accompanied by a performing monkey named Squeeks, he fights crime to avenge his parents' deaths. He is described by Joe Brancetelli in The World Encyclopedia of Comics as "a hero, yes, but first a boy... arguably the best-handled boy's adventure feature ever to appear in comics." Some sources credit the character solely to Charles Biro; others co-credit Bob Wood, co-credited on the first cover of the new Boy Comics title.

== Publication history ==
Crimebuster was introduced in Boy Comics #3 (April 1942, the first issue of the periodical following a revamp, after two issues as Captain Battle Jr.). In that issue the character's father, a heroic war correspondent, is killed by a Nazi criminal called Iron Jaw (due to his metallic prosthetic lower face). Iron Jaw has also abducted Chuck's mother, so the boy travels to France to rescue her, but during their escape she is killed by Germans. Chuck adds his military school's cape to the contemporary hockey uniform he is wearing at the time this adventure begins (which conveniently features the school's initial "C" on the chest), and takes on the name "Crimebuster".

He pursues Iron Jaw until issue #15, in which the character is killed, but continues his crusade. (Iron Jaw returns later in the series.) Chuck also tangles with a hermaphroditic serial killer named the He-She in issue #9.

Although his initial adventures focused on his "crimebusting" agenda, as the superhero genre became less popular, stories focused more on the character's school life. With the war over, the school changed from Custer Military Academy to Curtis High School. He stopped wearing the costume, explained in-story by a girl suggesting that it looked silly. He dropped the "Crimebuster" name altogether after issue #111 (May 1955) (his friends continued to call him "C.B.") when the Comics Code Authority – with its restrictions on the use of the word "crime" – was established. He continued as "Chuck Chandler" until Boy Comics ceased publication, with issue #119 (March 1956).

The character was revived briefly in 1990 by AC Comics, a publisher focusing on Golden Age superheroes, in their series Femforce.

== In popular culture ==
The cover of Rage Against the Machine's album Evil Empire features a painting by Mel Ramos of a boy costumed as Crimebuster, with the letter on his chest changed to a lowercase "e".
