= Crime Does Not Pay (comics) =

Comic book published by Lev Gleason Publications

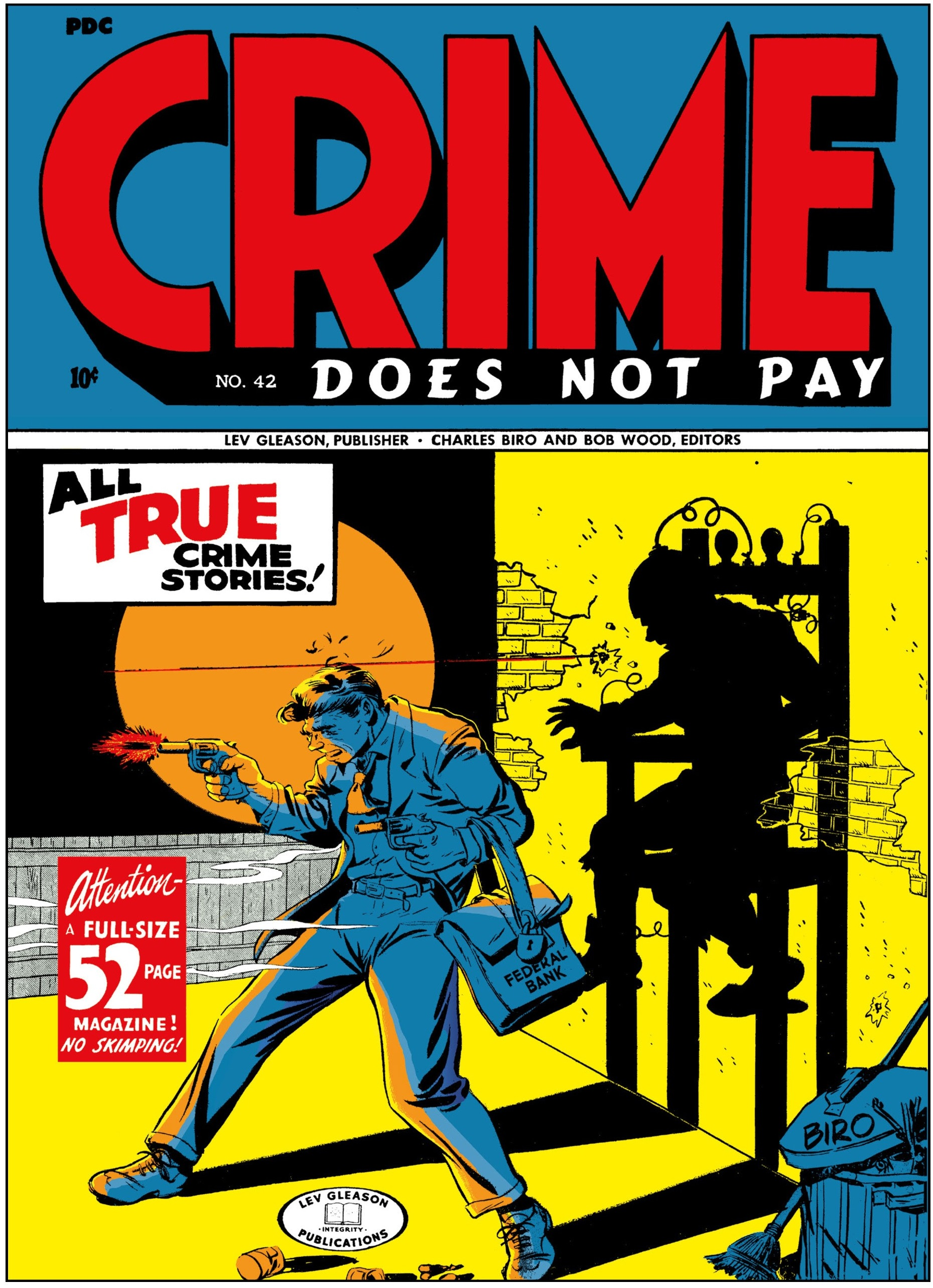
- Electrocution cover, issue 42

Publication information
- Publisher: Lev Gleason Publications
- Schedule: Monthly
- Format: Ongoing series
- Publication date: July 1942 – July 1955

Creative team
- Created by: Charles Biro; Bob Wood
- Written by: Charles Biro; Bob Wood
- Artist(s): Charles Biro; George Tuska

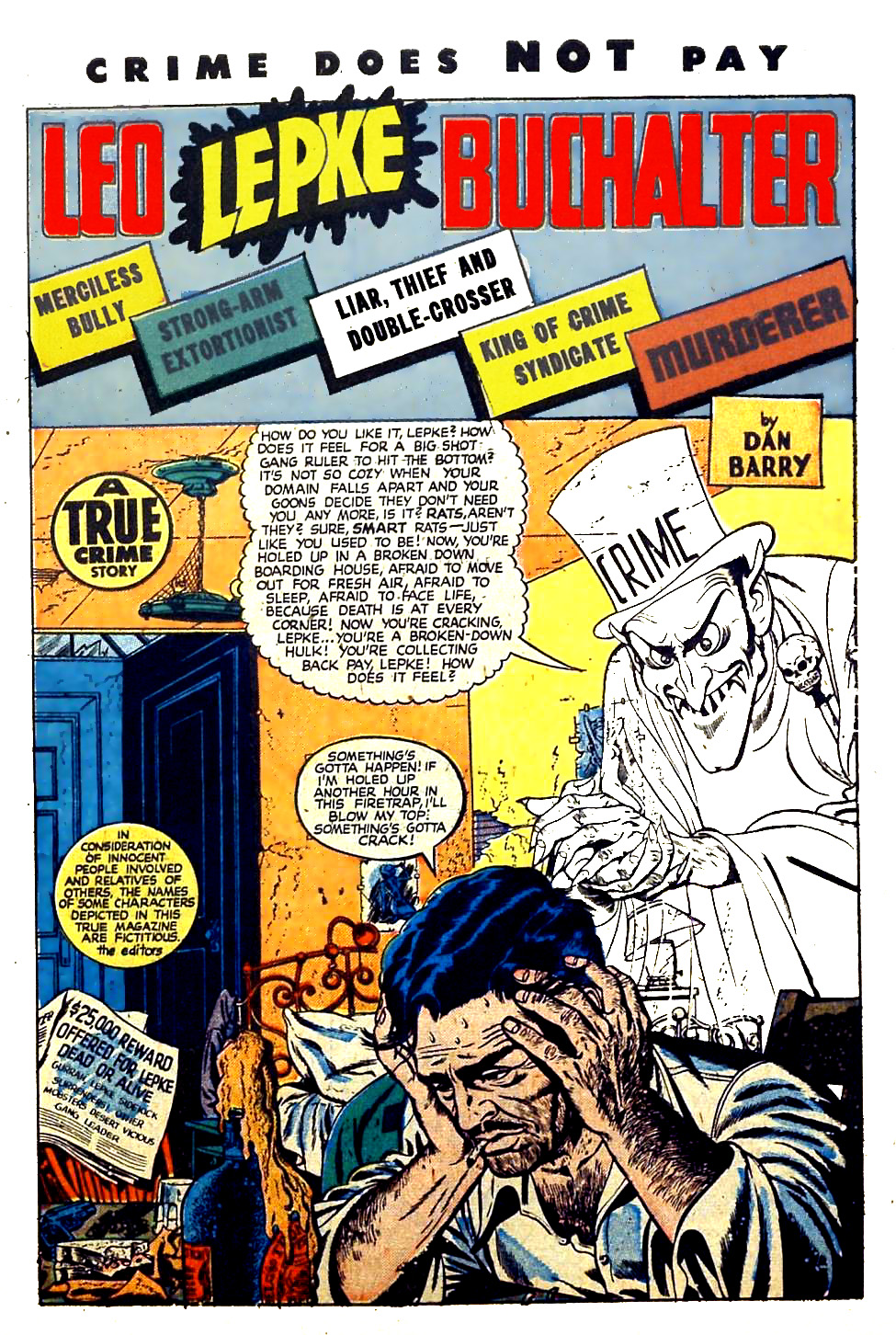
Splash panel from Crime Does Not Pay number 55, September 1947. Artwork by Dan Barry.

Crime Does Not Pay is an American comic book series published between 1942 and 1955 by Lev Gleason Publications. Edited and chiefly written by Charles Biro, the title launched the crime comics genre and was the first "true crime" comic book series. At the height of its popularity, Crime Does Not Pay would claim a readership of six million on its covers. The series' sensationalized recountings of the deeds of gangsters such as Baby Face Nelson and Machine Gun Kelly were illustrated by artists Bob Wood, George Tuska, and others. Stories were often introduced and commented upon by "Mr. Crime", a ghoulish figure in a top hat, and the precursor of horror hosts such as EC Comics's The Crypt Keeper. According to Gerard Jones, Crime Does Not Pay was "the first nonhumor comic to rival the superheroes in sales, the first to open the comic book market to large numbers of late adolescent and young males."

== Origin ==
When Lev Gleason hired Bob Wood and Charles Biro to edit Daredevil and Silver Streak comics in 1941, he rewarded the two cartoonists with a profit-sharing program and creator credits on the covers of the comics. In addition, Gleason urged the pair to create new titles for his company under the understanding that they would share in the profits. Biro and Wood discussed the matter and eventually came up with a concept that would become Crime Does Not Pay, a comic book series chronicling the lives of murderers and gangsters based in part on real world people. Biro is reputed to have been inspired by a meeting with a kidnapper and pimp one night in a bar, although publisher Arthur Bernhard has stated that the entire concept was created by Gleason. The title was based on a popular radio and MGM film series.

== First issues ==
Heralded by ads in other Gleason tiles, Crime Does Not Pay took over the numbering of Silver Streak comics with issue 22 cover dated July 1942. The first issue featured articles and comic stories about real criminals and was written by Biro and Wood. Biro designed and drew the first cover and wrote stories about mobsters Louis Buchalter and "Diamond Joe" Esposito, and gunfighter Wild Bill Hickok.

Initial issues sold approximately 200,000 copies each, a healthy number for the time, but by the end of World War II the title was selling 800,000 per issue. When sales reached one million in 1948, the editors added the claim "More Than 5,000,000 Readers Monthly" to the cover, a reference to the pass-along effect of comics circulation.

== Content ==
Mostly written by Charles Biro, the stories in Crime Does Not Pay became known for their lurid detail, confessional tone, and exceptional, violent artwork. The stories often dealt frankly with adult relationships, drug use and sex, in addition to the depictions of physical violence, torture, and murder that were standard for every issue.

Recurring features included "Officer Common Sense", beginning with issue 41, "Chip Gardner", issue 22, and "Who Dunnit", puzzle mystery series with art by Fred Guardineer, beginning with issue 39.

== Mr. Crime ==
Issue 24 introduced the Biro-designed figure of Mr. Crime, the cartoon mascot of the series, who narrated and commented on the action depicted in the comics, addressing his readers in a joking, conspiratorial tone. Mr. Crime dressed in a white top hat (labeled "Crime") and white sheet. His bizarre visage resembled a gremlin, with pointed ears, nose and teeth. In many ways he was similar to the character of Mr. Coffee Nerves from a series of print ads for Postum designed by cartoonists Milt Caniff and Noel Sickles. The character of Mr. Crime pre-dated the Horror Hosts of EC Comics and other publishers, and his ghostly presence is very similar to that effected by Rod Serling on The Twilight Zone television series and of Raymond Edward Johnson on the Inner Sanctum radio program.

Mr. Crime's attitude toward the tales he narrated was ambivalent at best. In some panels he seemed to approve of and even encourage the crimes of a story's miscreants (acting as a sort of anti-conscience, invisible to the characters), while in others he was openly contemptuous of criminals, rarely failing, as the story's protagonists met their end in the denouement, to remind readers that, as the title indicated, "Crime Does Not Pay".

== Other crime comics ==
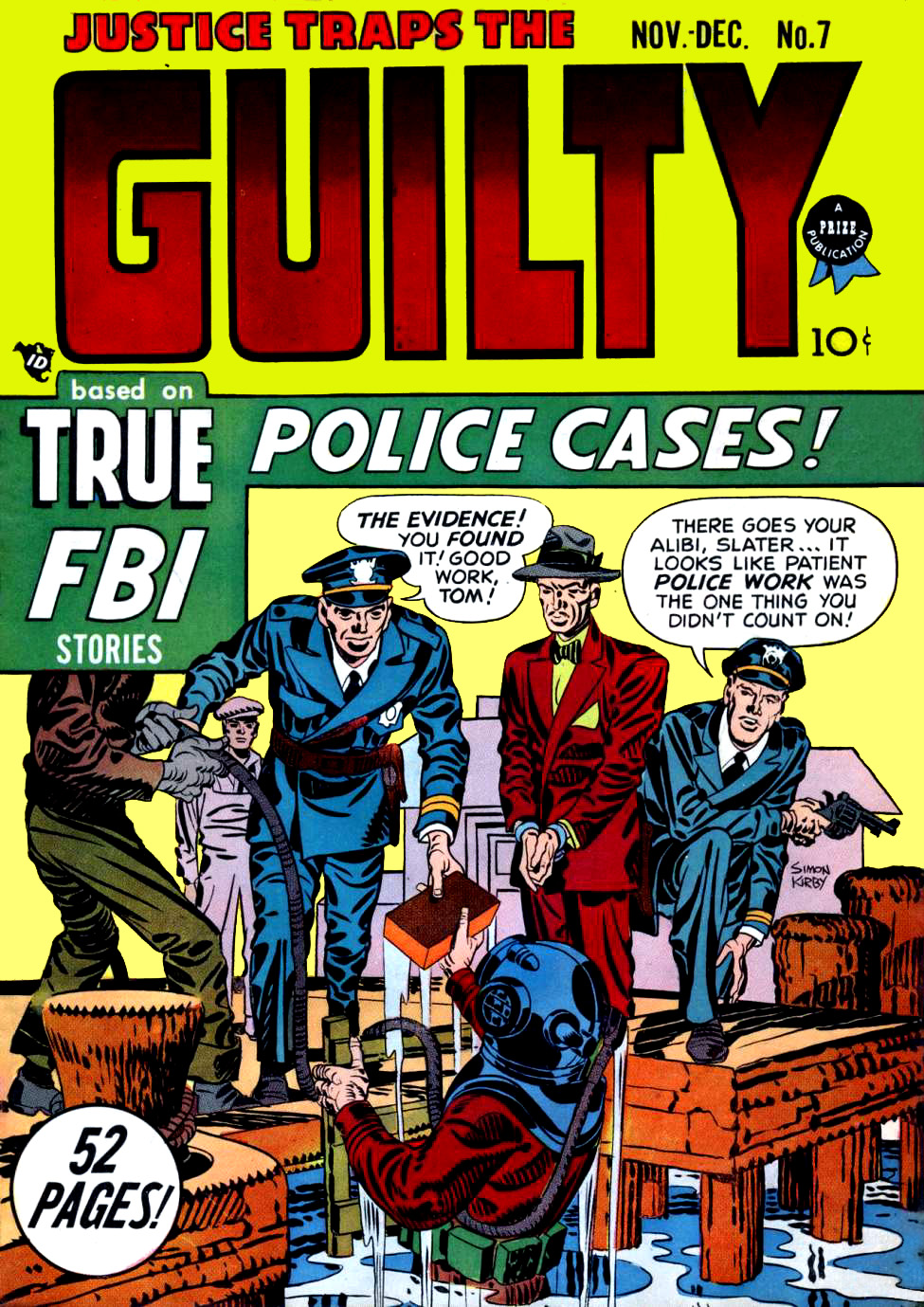
Justice Traps the Guilty number 7 (Prize Comics, November 1947). Artwork by Joe Simon and Jack Kirby.

The series remained essentially alone in its choice of subject matter for most of the 1940s but eventually inspired a host of imitators, including Jack Kirby and Joe Simon's Headline Comics and Real Clue for Hillman Periodicals (1947), Marvel's Official True Crime Cases (1947), DC's Gang Busters (1947), and Fox's Crimes by Women (1948). In response, Gleason and Biro ran attack ads in their own comics and launched a companion title to Crime Does Not Pay, called Crime and Punishment, in 1948. However, 1948 also saw more publishers enter the genre, with the result that, by one estimate "thirty different crime comics were on the stands by the end of 1948 and by 1949 roughly one in seven comics was a crime comics."

== Demise ==
Although continuously popular in terms of sales, Crime Does Not Pay and other crime comics increasingly became the targets of concerned parents, clergy, and other groups who were disturbed by the content of the comics and saw the stories as one of the root causes of a variety of social ills, including illiteracy and juvenile delinquency. In the wake of books such as Dr. Fredric Wertham's Seduction of the Innocent and the investigations of the Senate Subcommittee on Juvenile Delinquency, many publishers, including Lev Gleason, censored their own comics and adopted a strict code administered by the Comics Code Authority. The sanitized Crime Does Not Pay that resulted lasted only a few issues before being canceled with issue #147 in 1955.

== Spinoffs ==
Crime and Punishment
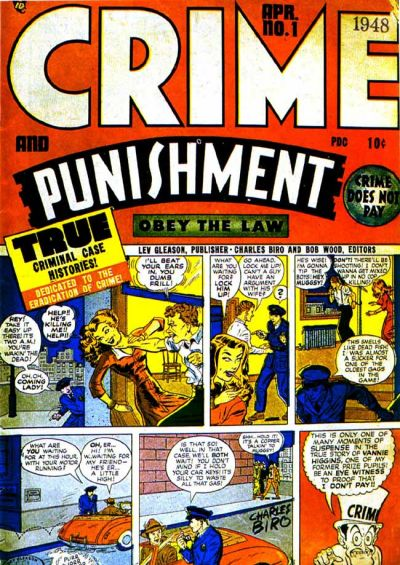
- Cover of Crime and Punishment #1 (April 1948) by Charles Biro.

Publication information
- Publisher: Lev Gleason Publications
- Format: Ongoing series
- Genre: True crime
- Publication date: April 1948 – August 1955
- No. of issues: 74
- Editor(s): Charles Biro; Bob Wood

The success of CDNP inspired Gleason and company to release Crime and Punishment, which ran from 1948 until 1954. The series ran for 74 issues and was primarily overseen by the same creative team from CDNP, Charles Biro and Bob Wood. The series differed from CDNP in that it featured less violent editorial content and featured stories that more prominently depicted police officers. The series' ghostly narrator, instead of the ghoulish Mr. Crime, was a policeman killed in the line of duty.

== Reprints ==
In Fall 2011, Dark Horse Comics published a collection called Blackjacked and Pistol-Whipped: A Crime Does Not Pay Primer which went on to become nominated for a 2012 Harvey Award (for Best Domestic Reprint Project). Also in 2012, Dark Horse began a complete archives series of the original hard-to-find Crime Does Not Pay issues. This ongoing series was nominated for an Eisner Award for Best Archival Collection/Project in 2013 with 10 volumes released. Dark Horse has scuttled plans to continue the line, although Volumes 11 and 12 were announced but never published.
