= Claw (Lev Gleason Publications) =

Lev Gleason Publications supervillain

The Claw
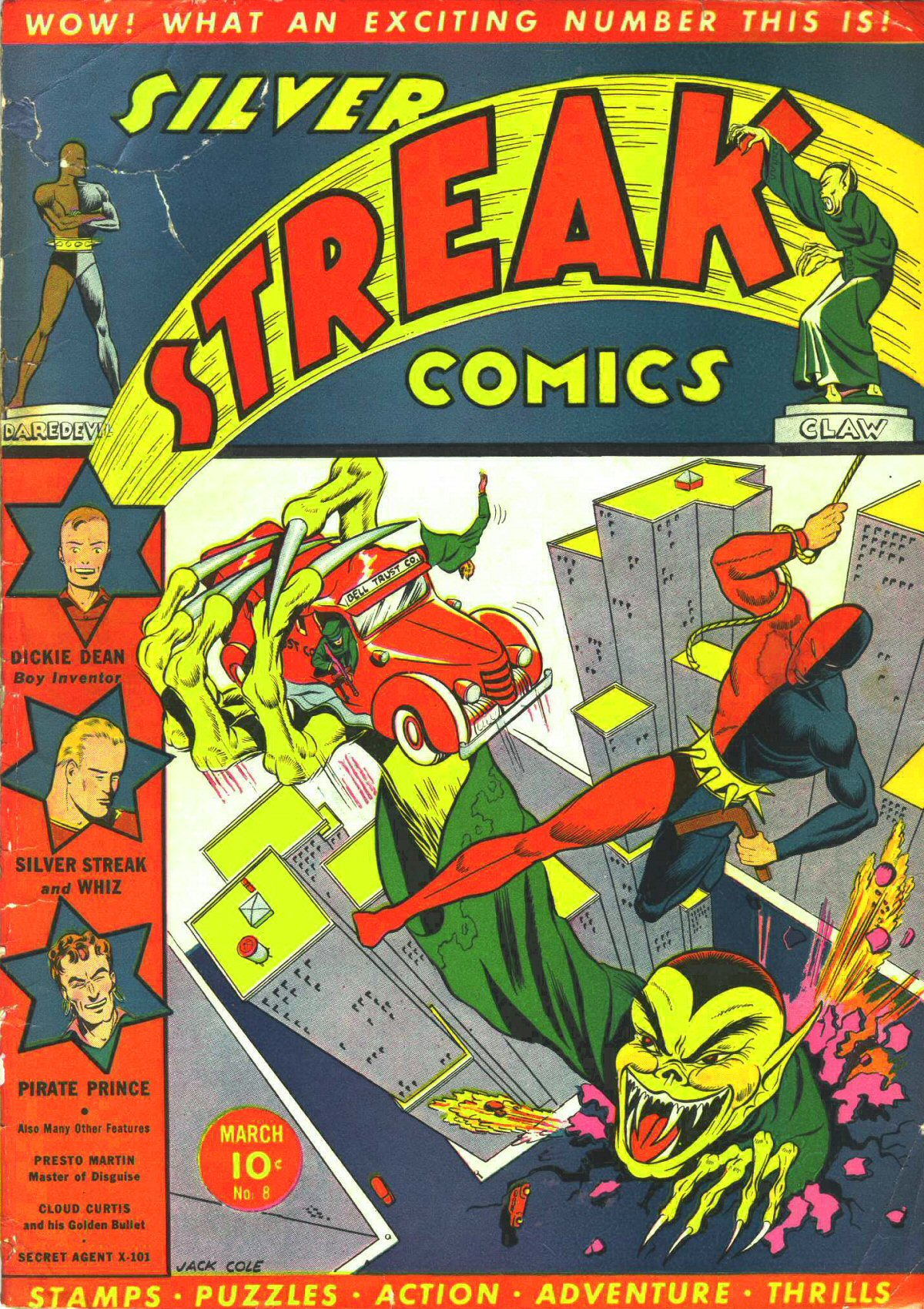
- Cover of Silver Streak Comics #8 (March 1941), art by Jack Cole.

Publication information
- Publisher: Lev Gleason Publications
- First appearance: Silver Streak Comics #1 (December 1939)
- Created by: Jack Cole

In-story information
- Alter ego: Unknown
- Species: Unknown
- Abilities: Can grow to gigantic size; sharp talons and fangs; other powers less defined. Has a vehicle that can bore through the ground.

The Claw is a supervillain who first appeared in Silver Streak Comics #1 (December 1939), from Lev Gleason Publications and later Savage Dragon from Image Comics. He is "a grotesque sorceror bent on world conquest".

== Publishing history ==
Created by Jack Cole (who would later create Plastic Man), the Claw first appeared as a monstrous supervillain in Silver Streak without any regular hero to oppose him. In issue #2, he offered to help Adolf Hitler conquer the world, in return for "half of Europe". He reappeared in #6; in #7 (January 1941), Lev Gleason's Daredevil went up against him for the first time. The Claw was then moved from Silver Streak to Daredevil Comics, and there he stayed until issue #31 (July 1945), when he was apparently killed off.

This wasn't quite the end of the Claw, however; he returned in Boy Comics #89 (May 1953), in which he was rewritten as the leader of an invasion force from another planet and was opposed by a hero named Rocky X; their battle lasted three issues. After that, The Claw fell into the public domain.

In the mid-1980s, Roy Thomas used "The Crimson Claw" as the main antagonist for his limited series Alter Ego.

In 2008, he started appearing in flashbacks in Dynamite Entertainment's Project Superpowers, in which Daredevil (now renamed The Death-Defying 'Devil) is a regular character; it's hinted that The Claw may be behind a worldwide terrorist movement of the same name. What the connection is between the villain and the terrorists remains to be seen.

In 2011, he appeared in stories in Barry Reese's "Lazarus Gray" volume 1, set in the 1930s.

In 2012, he was featured as the main villain in Jack Leventreur's Teen Trickster's Adult Adventures Volume 3: The Claw Reborn. Another public domain villain, MLJ's Ah Ku was also revealed to be his daughter.

== Fictional biography ==
=== Lev Gleason Publications ===
The Claw first appeared in 1939 as the ruler of a Pacific island nation called Ricca, and the leader of a band of pirates; throughout eastern Asia he's called the God of Hate. Although he may appear human from a distance, his hands have long bony talons, and his large animal-like mouth contains long razor-sharp teeth. He has the ability to become large enough to tower over skyscrapers, and has other powers (which aren't clearly defined) which wax and wane with the phases of the moon. He has a vehicle that can travel underground, boring through solid rock.

He's battled against many superheroes over the years, most often Daredevil. In 1945, it appeared that the Claw was finally killed from a combination of poison gas and a death ray.

=== Project Superpowers ===
In the modern world, a terrorist movement calling itself The Claw is causing death and destruction around the world; the recently returned 'Devil and his allies are uncertain if the monster they'd fought decades earlier is somehow behind it, and possibly still alive. Whether or not this is the case remains to be seen.

=== Savage Dragon ===
In Erik Larsen's Savage Dragon (which has also incorporated the Golden Age Daredevil since issue #140) it was revealed that the Claw was brought back to life by Wargod's Born Again Machine and now has plans for world domination. In issue #184 (Jan 2013) the Claw reveals himself and takes another reoccurring villain Thunderhead as a minion. Upcoming storylines appear to include The Claw as a major new villain for the Savage Dragon cast. The current storyline appears to pick up where the Claw's Golden Age appearance left off in Daredevil Comics #31 (1945) and disregards any further appearances until his resurrection in Savage Dragon #183 (Nov 2012).
