= Daredevil (Lev Gleason Publications) =

Lev Gleason Publications superhero

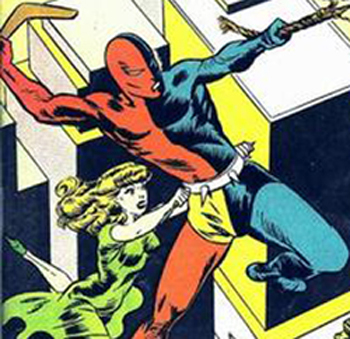
- Daredevil, from the cover of Daredevil Comics #5 (November 1941), art by Charles Biro.

Publication information
- Publisher: Lev Gleason Publications; AC Comics; Image Comics; Dynamite Entertainment
- First appearance: Silver Streak #6 (September 1940)
- Created by: Jack Binder (writer-artist); Don Rico; Revamped by Jack Cole

In-story information
- Alter ego: Bart Hill; Bill Hart
- Team affiliations: Little Wise Guys (AC Comics) Sentinels of Justice
- Notable aliases: The Dynamic Daredevil, Reddevil, Doubledare, Death-Defying 'Devil
- Abilities: Highly athletic Superior reflexes Skilled acrobat, boxer and martial artist Expert boomerang marksman

Daredevil, a superhero created by Jack Binder, starred in comics from Lev Gleason Publications during the 1930s–1940s period that historians and fans call the Golden Age of comic books. The character was retroactively established into the Image Universe by Image Comics in the 1990s as its first character. The character is unrelated to Marvel Comics' Daredevil, and recent renditions of the character have often renamed him Doubledare or The Death-Defying Devil to avoid confusion and potential lawsuits.

As a child, Bart Hill had been rendered mute by the shock of seeing his father murdered and himself being branded with a hot iron. Orphaned, he grew up to become a boomerang marksman, in homage to the boomerang-shaped scar left on his chest. Like Batman, introduced a year earlier, he took up a costume to wage vigilante vengeance.

Editor Jack Cole, who would create the classic Plastic Man a year later, revamped the character in the next issue as Bill Hart, pitting him against Silver Streak's lead character, the villainous Claw, for a five-issue battle that made Daredevil a star.

== Publication history ==
=== Lev Gleason Publications ===
This original Daredevil was created by Jack Binder for an eight-page backup feature in Lev Gleason Publications' Silver Streak Comics #6 (Sept. 1940). Upon his partial revamping in the issue following his debut, only Hill's identity, spiked belt, and the boomerang remained; the mute angle was dropped without explanation, and his original symmetrically divided bodysuit of pale yellow and dark blue was redesigned to a dark red and blue. The final installment was written by Don Rico, who would write the character through Silver Streak #17 (Dec. 1941).

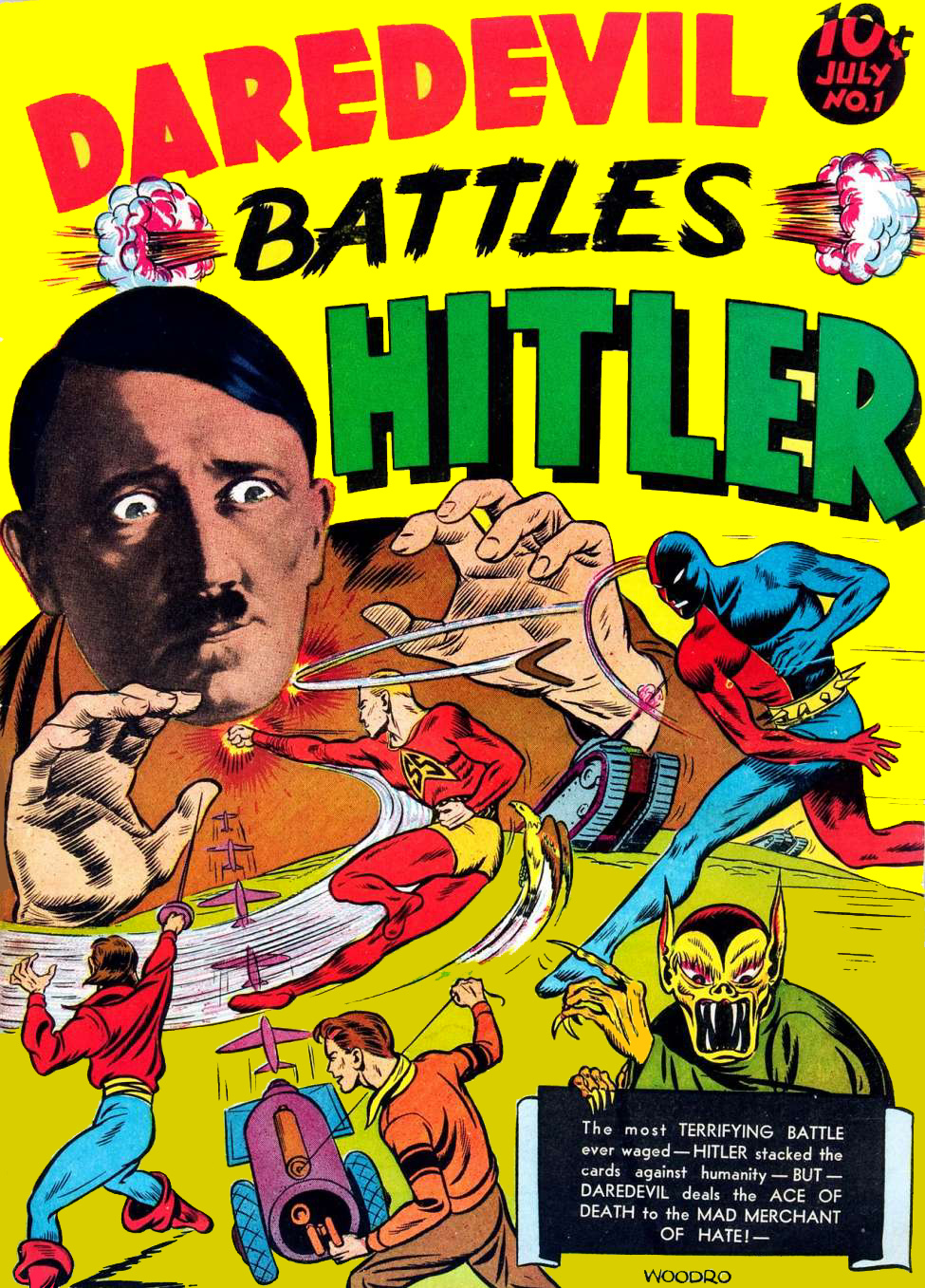
Daredevil Battles Hitler (July 1941), the premiere issue of Daredevil Comics; art by Charles Biro and Bob Wood.

By this time, publisher Lev Gleason had already launched Daredevil's own comic with Daredevil Battles Hitler #1 (July 1941), in which Daredevil and other Silver Streak heroes fought the German chancellor. As with Captain America Comics #1 (March 1941), in which Hitler also gets an ignominious sock in the jaw, the comic anticipated U.S. involvement in World War II. It was written and partially drawn by Charles Biro, who continued on the book when its title changed to Daredevil Comics with issue #2, and who in his 16-year run would make the character one of the most acclaimed of the Golden Age. Biro rewrote Daredevil's origin in issue #18 (August 1943), now depicting Daredevil's real identity, Bart Hill, as having been raised by aborigines in the Australian Outback.

According to Jess Nevins' Encyclopedia of Golden Age Superheroes, "his arch-enemy is the Claw, but there are Nazis to be fought, mad scientists, the Deadly Dozen, Wolf Carson (a wolf with a human brain), the Ghoul, Reve Venge (the Phantom of Notre Dame), and Crepto, the imbecile with the strength of fifteen men".

Biro introduced popular supporting characters the Little Wise Guys in Daredevil #13 (Oct. 1942). A "kid gang" similar to DC Comics' Newsboy Legion and many others, the group consisted of Curly, Jocko, Peewee, Scarecrow, and Meatball – the last of whom, with remarkable daring, was killed two issues later. By the late 1940s, with superheroes going out of fashion, the Little Wise Guys took center stage, edging out Daredevil altogether with issue #70 (Jan. 1950). The series lasted through #134 (Sept. 1956).

=== Image Comics ===
Daredevil is one of several public domain Golden Age characters to appear in Image Comics' Next Issue Project, spearheaded by Image's Erik Larsen, returning to Silver Streak, the book which introduced him to the public.

Daredevil also appeared in issue #141 of Larsen's Savage Dragon comic series. That issue served to resurrect a slew of public domain Golden Age characters. Savage Dragon #148 debuted The Dynamic Daredevil as a regular supporting cast member in the series. That issue also brought back the Little Wise Guys. Daredevil becomes deeply involved in the problems of Dragon's ravaged Chicago; he becomes severely injured battling a murderous version of Dragon. In 2021, the Dynamic Daredevil appeared as supporting character in a new Ant comic series, which was published in June, written and drawn by Larsen.

=== Other publishers ===
Daredevil is now in the public domain, and as a result many publishers have used him to varying degrees, most opting to make name changes in an effort to have something to own and to get around Marvel's Daredevil trademark.

==== AC Comics ====
In the late 1980s, AC Comics revived Daredevil as part of that publisher's superhero universe. Renamed Reddevil, he appeared as a guest character in Femforce #45 and #50 before starring in the one-shot title Reddevil #1 (1991).

==== First Publications ====
Daredevil was one of the many Golden Age heroes who showed up in Roy Thomas' Alter Ego mini-series. He is renamed as Doubledare.

==== Dynamite Entertainment ====
A variation on Daredevil appeared in the comic-book series Project Superpowers, by writer Jim Krueger and artist Alex Ross. In this series, he is billed and trademarked as The Death-Defying 'Devil. In 2008, Dynamite Entertainment spun off a solo miniseries for the character, written by Joe Casey with art by Edgar Salazar. In this series, someone from 'Devil's past – wearing a green version of 'Devil's costume and calling himself "Dragon" – believes that the returned hero is an impostor, and is determined to expose him. The Dragon turns out to be Curly, who reveals that the actual 'Devil died in 1987. Within the main series itself, the 'Devil is eventually revealed to be Bart Hill's costume, which had in fact always been sentient and was placed in the urn along with a single boomerang as part of a pact between Hill and the Fighting Yank. The costume does not explicitly reveal its nature to its allies, but eventually discards its pretense of being human by handing the Black Terror the dentures it had been using to create the illusion of a mouth. It possesses additional powers, such as the ability to grow new spike-like branches and the knowledge of an ancient language needed to banish the Claw, and is implied to have its own, sinister agenda.

==== Wild Cat Books ====
Daredevil also appears in Legends of the Golden Age (ISBN 0982087292), an anthology featuring prose tales of Daredevil and the Black Terror. Barry Reese contributed one of the stories in this anthology, which was released in January 2009 by Wild Cat Books.

== Golden Age appearances ==
The Daredevil appeared in:

- Silver Streak Comics #6–17 (Sept 1940 – Dec 1941)
- Daredevil Comics #1–69, 79, 80 (July 1941 – Nov 1950)

== Legacy ==
The costume worn by the Charlton Comics character Peter Cannon, Thunderbolt was inspired by Daredevil's, according to creator Pete Morisi. The initial similarities were taken even further when artist Alex Ross gave Thunderbolt a redesigned costume that more closely resembled Daredevil's in DC Comics' Kingdom Come series.

Roy Thomas based the costume of the Marvel Comics character 3-D Man on Daredevil, only colored red and green instead of red and blue, and with a chest symbol. In further homage to the Golden Age Daredevil, Marvel's own Daredevil would wear a similar costume in the alternate-reality Mutant X series in Mutant X Annual 2001. In addition, the 2000 Marvels Comics: Daredevil special had a group based on the Little Wise Guys.

== Film ==
Bart Hill (played by Andre Givogue) appears alongside other Golden Age superheroes in the independent film Avenging Force: The Scarab, where he's renamed as Doubledare possibly in order to avoid trademark issues with Marvel's Daredevil.

Ryan Hart stars as the character appears in the 2026 short The Dare-Devil directed by Chris R. Notarile. Here, he is rendered unable to speak after having his throat cut in an attack that also killed his girlfriend. He dons the costumed persona to seek bloody vengeance on their attackers.
