= Little Wise Guys =

Comic book characters

The Little Wise Guys is a group of fictional characters, created by Charles Biro, who first appeared in comic books from Lev Gleason Publications in the 1940s and Image Comics in the 2010s.

== Publication history ==
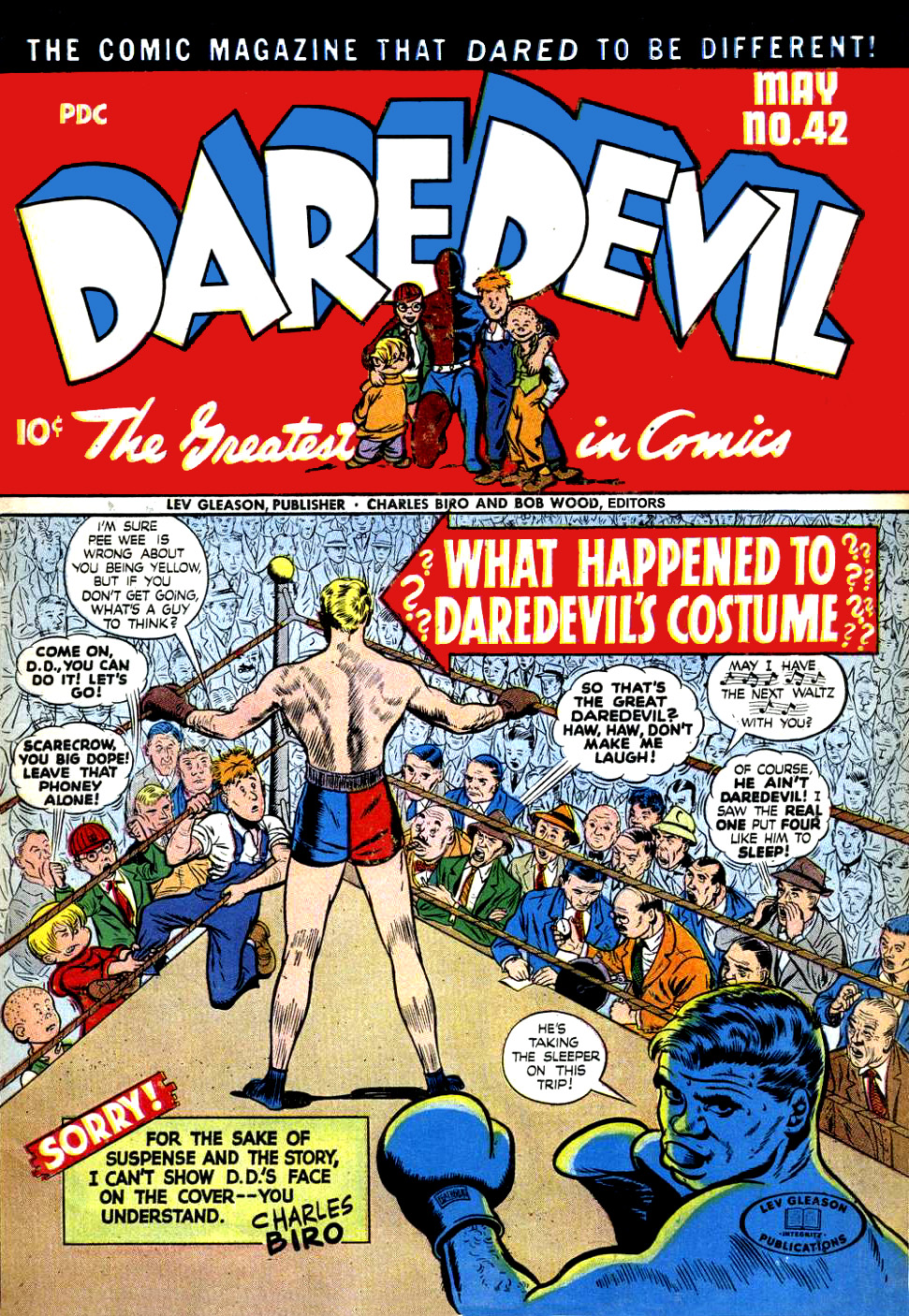
Daredevil and the Little Wise Guys on the cover of Daredevil number 42 (May 1947); artwork by Dan Barry.

The four original Little Wise Guys first appeared in Daredevil Comics #13 (Oct. 1942) and became the sidekicks of the title character. The original lineup included Scarecrow, Pee Wee, Jock and Meatball. Two issues later, one of them—Meatball—was killed off, and in issue #16 Curly was added.

As superheroes declined in popularity, Daredevil's role was gradually reduced to introducing the Wise Guys at the beginning of their stories. Starting with issue #70 (January 1951), he disappeared completely; the book was still called Daredevil Comics, but only the Little Wise Guys remained. The titular star briefly reappeared in issues #79 and 80, but that was the end of him.

Daredevil Comics ended with issue #134 (Sept. 1956), and the Little Wise Guys vanished along with it.

In 2009, however, the Little Wise Guys and Daredevil became supporting characters in the Image Comics series Savage Dragon, beginning with issue #148. These five characters, along with dozens of other Golden Age characters, had been brought back to life in an earlier issue of Savage Dragon (#141), although the Little Wise Guys didn't appear until this later issue.

Also that year, Curly was brought back in the Dynamite Entertainment miniseries The Death-Defying 'Devil as The Dragon.

== Fictional biography ==
=== Lev Gleason Publications ===
In the early 1940s, a group of young orphans and runaways called the Little Wise Guys encountered the superhero Daredevil while he was fighting a German-American cult. The four boys—Meatball, Jock, Scarecrow, and Peewee—soon became Daredevil's sidekicks. Later, Meatball was killed in action, and his place in the gang was soon taken over by a bald kid called Curly. When the four kids weren't helping Daredevil to battle crime, they were having rambunctious adventures of their own.

=== Image Comics ===
It was revealed that the Little Wise Guys, along with their mentor Daredevil, were captured by Solar Man and put in suspended animation. Their life force, along with those of dozens of other superpowered characters from the Golden Age of comics were used to augment Solar Man's in his fight against crime. Years later, ShadowHawk released the captured heroes from captivity and restored them to life. Now in the present, they have relocated to Chicago, Illinois, and frequently accompany Daredevil, Angel and Malcolm Dragon on adventures. When Savage Dragon faced Dart, she was knocked unconscious and the unaware Wise Guys, along with Daredevil took her into their care. Dart brutally murdered Jock who was watching when the others were away. Later she murdered the last three.

=== Dynamite Entertainment ===
Decades later, an elderly Curly saw a television broadcast announcing that the superheroes who had mysteriously vanished years ago had now returned, and that 'Devil was among them. Curly knew the original Daredevil had died in 1987, and on his deathbed had given Curly one of his boomerangs. Determined to expose the fraud, Curly obtained a drug on the black market that returned him to peak physical condition, and donned a green and purple version of 'Devil's costume; calling himself The Dragon, he then sought out 'Devil and exposed the fraud.
