= Jack Cole (artist) =

American cartoonist (1914-1958)

- Born: Jack Ralph Cole; December 14, 1914 New Castle, Pennsylvania, U.S.
- Died: August 13, 1958 (aged 43) Woodside Township, Sangamon County, Illinois, U.S.
- Areas: Cartoonist, Writer, Editor
- Pseudonyms: Geo. Nagle; Ralph Johns; Jake
- Notable works: Plastic Man
- Awards: Jack Kirby Hall of Fame (1991); Will Eisner Award Hall of Fame (1999)

Jack Ralph Cole (December 14, 1914 – August 13, 1958) was an American cartoonist best known for creating the comedic superhero Plastic Man, and his cartoons for Playboy magazine.

He was posthumously inducted into the comic book industry's Jack Kirby Hall of Fame in 1991 and the Will Eisner Award Hall of Fame in 1999.

== Early life ==
Police Comics No. 24 (Nov. 1943). Cover art by Jack Cole

Born in New Castle, Pennsylvania, Cole—the third of six children of a dry goods-store owner and amateur-entertainer father and a former elementary school-teacher mother—was untrained in art except for the Landon School of Illustration and Cartooning correspondence course. At age 17, he bicycled solo cross-country to Los Angeles, California and back. Cole recounted this adventure in an early self-illustrated professional sale "A Boy and His Bike" (which has often been cited as appearing in Boys' Life magazine, but in fact the source of this article is unknown, but speculated to have likely appeared in Cole's hometown newspaper). Cole graduated from high school in 1933 and took a job at American Can. In July 1934, he eloped with Dorothy Marie Mahoney.

== Career ==
=== Early work ===
In 1936, having married childhood sweetheart Dorothy Mahoney soon after graduating high school, Cole moved with his wife to New York City's Greenwich Village. After spending a year attempting to break in as a magazine/newspaper illustrator, Cole began drawing for the studio of Harry "A" Chesler, one of the first comic-book "packagers" who supplied outsourced stories to publishers entering the new medium. There, Cole drew such features as "TNT Todd of the FBI" and "Little Dynamite" for Centaur Publications comics such as Funny Pages and Keen Detective Funnies. He produced such additional features as "King Kole's Kourt" (under the pseudonym Geo. Nagle), "Officer Clancy", "Ima Slooth", "Peewee Throttle", and "Burp the Twerp: The Super So-An'-So" (the latter two under the pseudonym Ralph Johns).

=== Golden Age of Comic Books ===
Lev Gleason Publications hired Cole in 1939 to edit Silver Streak Comics, where one of his first tasks was to revamp the newly created superhero Daredevil. Other characters created or worked on by the prolific tyro include MLJ's The Comet in Pep Comics—who in short order became the first superhero to be killed—and his replacement, the Hangman.

After becoming an editor at Lev Gleason and revamping Jack Binder's original Golden Age Daredevil in 1940, Cole was hired at Quality Comics. He worked with Will Eisner, assisting on the writer-artist's signature hero The Spirit—a masked crime-fighter created for a weekly syndicated newspaper Sunday supplement and reprinted in Quality Comics. At the behest of Quality publisher Everett "Busy" Arnold, Cole later created his own satiric, Spirit-style hero, Midnight, for Smash Comics No. 18 (Jan. 1941). Midnight, the alter ego of radio announcer Dave Clark, wore a similar fedora hat and domino mask, and partnered with a talking monkey—questionably in place of the Spirit's young African-American sidekick, Ebony White. During Eisner's World War II military service, Cole and Lou Fine were the primary Spirit ghost artists; their stories were reprinted in DC Comics' hardcover collections The Spirit Archives Vols. 5 to 9 (2001–2003), spanning July 1942 – Dec. 1944. In addition, Cole continued to draw one and two-page filler pieces, sometimes under the pseudonym Ralph Johns, and a memorable autobiographical appearance in "Inki," which appeared in Crack Comics #34.

=== Plastic Man ===
Sample of Cole's original art for Humorama

Cole created Plastic Man for a backup feature in Quality's Police Comics #1 (Aug. 1941). While Timely Comics' quickly forgotten Flexo the Rubber Man had preceded "Plas" as comics' first stretching hero, Cole's character became an immediate hit, and Police Comics' lead feature with issue #5. As well, Cole's offbeat humor, combined with Plastic Man's ability to take any shape, gave the cartoonist opportunities to experiment with text and graphics in groundbreaking manner—helping to define the medium's visual vocabulary, and making the idiosyncratic character one of the few to endure from the Golden Age to modern times. Plastic Man gained his own title in 1943.

By the decade's end, however, Cole's feature was being created entirely by anonymous ghost writers and artists—including Alex Kotzky and John Spranger—despite Cole's name being bannered. One last stint by Cole himself in 1949 and 1950 could not save the title. Plastic Man was cancelled in 1956 after several years of reprinting the Cole material, and new stories by others.

Additionally, Cole and writer Joe Millard created the lighthearted feature "The Barker", starring carnival barker Carnie Callhan. Introduced in National Comics #42 (May, 1944), the feature spun off into a 15-issue comic of its own (Autumn 1946 - Dec. 1949)

=== Playboy ===
Cole's career by that time had taken on another dimension. In 1954, after having drawn slightly risqué, single-panel "good girl art" cartoons for magazines, using the pen name "Jake", Cole became a cartoon illustrator for Playboy. Under his own name, he produced full-page, watercolored gag cartoons of beautiful but dim girls and rich but equally dim old men. Cole's art first appeared in the fifth issue; he would have at least one piece published in Playboy each month for the rest of his life. So popular was his work that the second item of merchandise ever licensed by Playboy (after cufflinks with the famous rabbit-head logo) was a cocktail-napkin set, "Females by Cole", featuring his cartoons. Cole biographer Art Spiegelman said, "Cole's goddesses were estrogen soufflés who mesmerized the ineffectual saps who lusted after them."

=== Millie & Terry ===
Around the same time he started at Playboy, or possibly just before that, Jack Cole created a new comic strip for the faux army Sunday section The American Armed Forced Features, which was produced between 1955 and 1965 by the W.B. Bradbury Co. (which, according to comic and magazine historian Steven Rowe was "an ad agency, selling ads for college magazines in the 40s-50s, before branching out to ad inserts for the military") "Jack Cole's 1956 Mystery Comic Strip, comments section". February 21, 2010. as a ready made Sunday comic section that army newspapers could add to their own Saturday or Sunday paper (with room left for their own masthead). Called Millie & Terry, it told the humorous adventures of two friends who move to an army town, where they are constantly pursued by the wolfish soldiers. Stylistically, it fits right in between the style he used for his "Jake" cartoons and the later "Betsy and Me". Starting with three one page gags, Cole continued the series with half page gags until September 1957. Not much has been written about this unknown series, except for a short piece on Alan Holtz' The Stripper's Guide "American Armed Forces Features - Wha?"., a discussion by Jack Cole expert Paul Tumey "Jack Cole's Mystery 1956 Comic Strip". February 21, 2010. and a discussion with lot of samples by The Fabulous Fifties "Back To The Cole Mine". May 28, 2022.

=== Betsy and Me ===
In 1958, Cole created his own daily newspaper comic strip, Betsy and Me, which he sold to the Chicago Sun-Times Syndicate. The strip began on May 26 and chronicled the domestic adventures of nebbishy Chester Tibbet as narrator, his wife Betsy, and their 5-year-old genius son, Farley. For it, Cole utilized "a simplified style," historian Ron Goulart wrote, "reminiscent of the drawing in the UPA animated cartoons." Betsy and Me ran for 2 1/2 months before Cole's self-inflicted death; his last daily was published on September 6 and his last Sunday on September 14. In the final Cole daily, Betsy and Chester are seen signing up for a brand-new tract house in Sunken Hills. To continue the strip, the syndicate hired advertising artist Dwight Parks, who had been trying to sell his own strip about a philosophical hobo.

=== Death ===
On August 13, 1958, Cole got in his Chevy station wagon, purchased a rifle, and fatally shot himself in the head. On the day he died, Cole mailed a suicide note explaining the reasons for his suicide to his wife Dorothy. The coroner deemed that letter too personal and did not enter it as evidence at the ensuing inquest. The only explanation Dorothy Cole publicly gave was "We had had an argument before." She subsequently remarried, and disappeared from public view. Cole also wrote a suicide note to his editor and father figure, Hugh Hefner, which was printed in Art Spiegelman's biography of Cole, Jack Cole & Plastic Man: Forms Stretched To Their Limits. The note reads:

"Dear Hef, When you read this I shall be dead. I cannot go on living with myself and hurting those dear to me. What I do has nothing to do with you."

Gravett notes that while Cole owed Hefner money, his estate would cover this debt. Cole did not participate in the Playboy lifestyle, though the evening before his suicide, he did drink a substantial amount at a Playboy office party.

The reason why the 43-year-old Cole killed himself remains one of the greatest mysteries in 20th century American cartooning, according to journalist Paul Gravett. Cole was in the prime of a celebrated cartooning career, complete with praise for his sophisticated gag cartoons in Playboy, and gaining increasing visibility for his newspaper strip Betsy and Me. R. C. Harvey described the suicide as "one of the most baffling events in the history of cartooning".

== Legacy ==
Cole was posthumously inducted into the comic book industry's Jack Kirby Hall of Fame in 1991 and the Will Eisner Award Hall of Fame in 1999.

Cole's story "Murder, Morphine and Me", which he illustrated and possibly wrote for publisher Magazine Village's True Crime Comics No. 2 (May 1947), became a centerpiece of psychiatrist Dr. Fredric Wertham's crusade against violent comic books. Wertham, author of the influential study Seduction of the Innocent, cited a particular panel of the story's dope-dealing narrator about to be stabbed in the eye with a hypodermic needle as an example of the "injury-to-the-eye" motif.

In 2001, writer-artist Art Spiegelman and artist Chip Kidd collaborated on a Cole biography, Jack Cole and Plastic Man: Forms Stretched to Their Limits, a portion of which had been published in The New Yorker magazine in 1999.
