= Otto Eppers =

American cartoonist

Otto Eppers was an American cartoonist and illustrator active from the 1920s to 1950s. He is also known for a 1910 stunt in which he jumped off the Brooklyn Bridge.

== Biography ==
In 1910, at the age of 17, Otto Eppers jumped off the Brooklyn Bridge and emerged from the East River unscathed. He had coordinated with the tug Florence to retrieve him from the river. Upon making shore, he was arrested by a New York City policeman on the charge of attempted suicide. He was arraigned before a Magistrate Appelton, who dismissed the charges after commenting to the NYPD's Captain Burke, "Well, he seems very much alive, doesn't he?"

The Bradford Era July 4, 1910 24 days after jumping off the bridge, Otto submitted his picture and diagram to newspapers. His story was nationwide from New Hampshire to Oregon to California to Alabama and in between.

Eppers contributed characters to QSL cards for ham radio operators. He was a resident of Clearfield, Pennsylvania, where he was active in the ham radio community with the callsigns W8EA and W2EA.

He later worked for the Harry "A" Chesler studio. and for Timely Comics. His contributions as penciler and-or inker or include stories for these features or in these series:

- "Scottie" (penciler-inker), 1942, Timely Comics
- "Happy Landings' (penciler-inker), 1945, Chesler Publications
- "IMA Slooth" (penciler-inker), 1945, Chesler Publications
- "Punch and Cutey" (penciler-inker), 1945 (pen/ink), Chesler Publications
- Gay Comics (inker), 1946, Timely Comics
- "Inspector Fumble" (inker), 1963, reprint, I.W. Publications
- Gunsmoke Western (inker), 1963, Marvel Comics

Eppers died December 22, 1955, at the age of 62.
