= Real Clue Crime Stories =

Comic book series

The Real Clue Crime Stories comics series debuted in June 1947, following three issues as Clue Comics. The first cover was done by Joe Simon and Jack Kirby. The comic title came about following the huge success of Crime Does Not Pay (comics), which had a circulation of more than two million monthly by 1947.

Simon and Kirby convinced Ed Cronin, the editor of Hillman Comics, to let them do stories which appealed to a similar audience as the Gleason publication. The first cover of Real Clue Crime Stories was Volume 2, #4. The Simon and Kirby cover featured a quote from Ralph Waldo Emerson which said Commit a crime and the world is made of glass. This became a continuing slogan of the comic, appearing in the top right hand corner of front covers.

Inside each issue featured three stories by Simon and Kirby, along with a regular feature character, Gunmaster, by Dan Barry. Among the stories adapted by Simon and Kirby was "Come With Me and Diel", about a criminal who targeted his victims during The Blitz, in London, England. In the opening panel the reader is introduced to the comic's narrator, Inspector Greeno of Scotland Yard. Greeno solves the crime because of an ID tag which the killer inadvertently dropped during an attempted homicide.
