= Jack Binder (artist) =

Golden Age comics creator and art packager

Jack King
- Born: August 11, 1902 Austria-Hungary
- Died: March 6, 1986 (aged 83)
- Areas: Cartoonist, Penciller, Inker, Publisher
- Notable works: Daredevil (Lev Gleason Publications); Jack Binder Studio

John Binder (/ˈbɪndər/; August 11, 1902 – March 6, 1986) was a Golden Age comics creator and art packager. A fine artist by education, Binder had a prolific comics career that lasted primarily from 1937 to 1953, through his most concentrated work was through 1946. He was the creator of the original comic book Daredevil, for Lev Gleason Publications. Binder is credited with coining the term zero gravity as part of a 1938 article in Thrilling Wonder Stories. Binder's younger brothers were Earl and Otto Binder, collectively known as Eando Binder when writing science fiction.

== Biography ==
Born into a German-Lutheran family in Austria-Hungary, Binder emigrated to America in 1910, where he settled with his parents and five siblings in Chicago.

Six months after the debut of Thrilling Wonder Stories, its June 1937 issue contained a picture feature by Jack Binder entitled If---!. Binder's earlier training as a fine artist helped him create detailed renderings of space ships, lost cities, future cities, landscapes, indigenous peoples, and even ancient Atlantis. If---!'s pen and ink drawings are hand-lettered and rendered in black and white. These one-to-two page studies presented readers with possible outcomes to early 20th-century scientific quandaries. In the October 1938 issue of the pulp magazine, Binder's article "If Science Reached the Earth's Core" is the first attested use of the phrase "zero gravity".

Moving to New York City, Binder worked for three years for the Harry "A" Chesler studio, one of the early comic-book "packagers" that supplied complete comics on demand for publishers entering the new medium. Binder left the Chesler studio in 1940 as the firm's art director.

In the early 1940s Binder drew for Fawcett Comics, Lev Gleason Publications, and Timely Comics; during this period he created the Golden Age character Daredevil (not to be confused with the Marvel character of the same name) for an eight-page backup feature in Lev Gleason Publications' Silver Streak #6 (September 1940), and along with Stan Lee, co-created the Destroyer in Timely's Mystic Comics #6 (October 1941).

=== Jack Binder Studio ===
By 1942 Binder had formed his own studio, with over 50 artists, in a Fifth Avenue loft in Manhattan. Later, Binder moved his studio to Englewood, New Jersey, to the upstairs loft of a barn, where it produced material for publishers like Fawcett, Nedor Comics, and Lev Gleason Publications. Features the studio worked on included the Fighting Yank, Mister Scarlet and Pinky, Bulletman, Ibis the Invincible, Captain Battle, the Black Owl, and the adapted pulp magazine features Doc Savage and The Shadow. In addition to running the studio, Binder drew layouts for Fawcett Comics stories which other artists finished for him.

Artists employed by Jack Binder Studios included Ken Bald, Carmine Infantino, Gil Kane, Pete Riss, Kurt Schaffenberger, and Bill Ward. Bald eventually became the studio art director. As Kane recalled, "Binder had a loft on Fifth Avenue and it just looked like an internment camp. There must have been 50 or 60 guys up there, all at drawing tables. You had to account for the paper that you took."

After closing his studio in 1946, Binder continued to work casually in the industry until he fully retired in 1953 and returned to fine and commercial art. He lived in Chestertown, New York, at the time of his death.

=== Erroneous Pseudonym ===
Some reference works erroneously state Charles Maxwell Plaisted was a pseudonym for Binder when in fact Plaisted was a real person.
