= Captain Battle =

Fictional superhero from the Golden Age of Comics

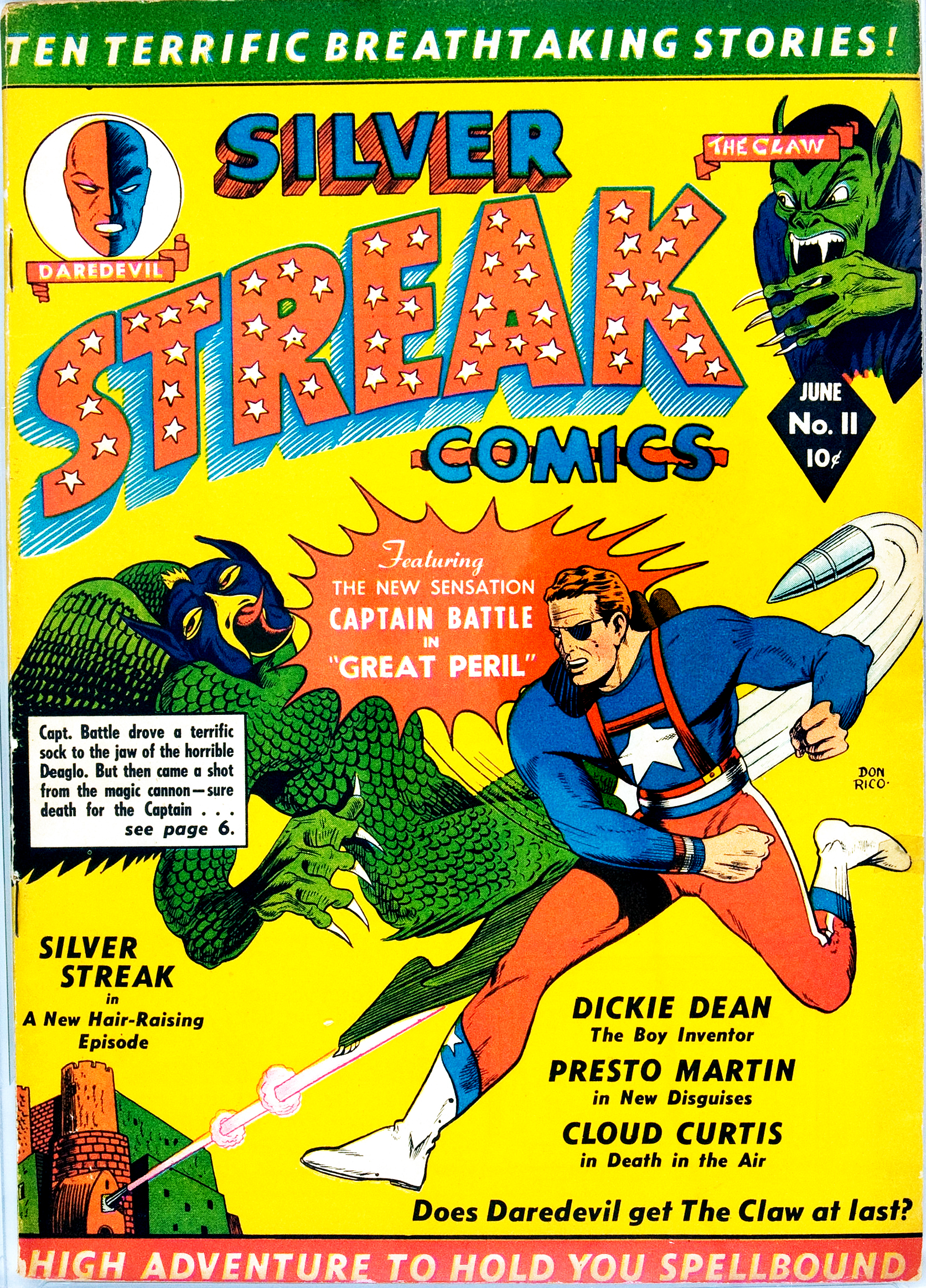
- Art by Don Rico.

Publication information
- Publisher: Lev Gleason Publications; Image Comics
- First appearance: Silver Streak Comics #11 (May 1941)

Captain Battle is a fictional hero and one of the features in Lev Gleason's Silver Streak Comics, from the period known as the "Golden Age of Comic Books". The character is a wounded World War I veteran who has devoted his life to stopping war. He was created by Carl Formes and Jack Binder.

== Publication history ==
The character appeared in Silver Streak Comics from issue #10 (May 1941) to #21 (May 1942).

The character was popular enough to get a brief solo series, published in Summer and Fall 1941.

Captain Battle is one of the four features in the second issue of Image Comics' Next Issue Project, Silver Streak Comics #24.

== Fictional character biography ==
Jonathan Battle was the youngest combatant in World War I, and lost his eye. Since then, Jonathan Battle uses his jet-pack, called a luceflyer, and a series of fantastic inventions to prevent World War II from taking place, including a Curvoscope, which allows him to see anywhere on the Earth by following the curvature of the Earth, and Dissolvo, which breaks down nerve and bone tissue into gelatin.

In his first three-part story, Captain Battle fought an Asian wizard known as the Black Dragon, and his army of Deaglos, humans that the Dragon had transformed into angry bird-men. At the end of the story, the surviving Deaglos were changed back to human — including an orphan, Nathan Hale, who became Battle's ward and teenage sidekick.

During his run he had three sidekicks: Hale, Kane and Captain Battle, Jr. (his son, William Battle).

The villains that Captain Battle faces include Dr. Dracula, Herr Skull, Herr Death, Sir Satan, Baron Doom, and Friar Diablo.

== Film ==
In 2013, the film Captain Battle: Legacy War was released.

The film Captain Battle: Legacy War is titled Captain USA vs. Nazi Fighters and Dark Skies in German markets

== Notes ==
- In the second story of Captain Battle #1, Captain Battle fights a group of German spies who steal a film about to be shown to a military audience. The Captain apprehends the spies and brings them to an agent friend of his - who doesn't recognize him in costume even though the Captain wears no mask! - then returns to the theatre, where he claims to have slept through the film. Clearly this story was meant to feature another character entirely, as the Captain normally doesn't use a dual identity.
