= Barry Reese =

American writer (born 1972)

Barry Reese (born November 11, 1972) is an American writer. He is best known for his work on The Official Handbook of the Marvel Universe for Marvel Comics, D6 Space: Fires of Amatsumara Worldbook for West End Games and his pulp adventure universe series of novels. He has one son, Julian Reese.

Reese was born in Milledgeville, Georgia.

== Career ==
In 2003 Reese began work for Marvel Comics on volume five of their Marvel Encyclopedia series. Reese was responsible for handling the Blade and Ghost Rider sections of the book. Following this, Reese worked on both the ongoing The Official Handbook of the Marvel Universe series and on D6 Space: Fires of Amatsumara Worldbook for West End Games. Amongst the issues of the Handbook that Reese worked on were Marvel Legacy: 1960s, Marvel Legacy: 1970s, Spider-Man 2006, Teams 2006, A-Z volumes 1-7 and Horror 2006. Reese also contributed to the New Avengers: Most Wanted and Marvel Monsters: From the Files of Ulysses Bloodstone books.

Reese then contributed to USER'S Most Wanted, a villains supplement for the Godsend Agenda game belonging to Khepera Publishing. USER'S Most Wanted was published in May 2007.

In 2003 Reese began work for Marvel Comics on volume five of their Marvel Encyclopedia series. Following this, Reese worked on both the ongoing The Official Handbook of the Marvel Universe series and on D6 Space: Fires of Amatsumara Worldbook for West End Games. Amongst the issues of the Handbook that Reese worked on were Marvel Legacy: 1960s, Marvel Legacy: 1970s, Spider-Man 2006, Teams 2006, A-Z volumes 1-7 and Horror 2006. Reese also contributed to the New Avengers: Most Wanted and Marvel Monsters: From the Files of Ulysses Bloodstone books.

Reese then contributed to USER'S Most Wanted, a villains supplement for the Godsend Agenda game belonging to Khepera Publishing. USER'S Most Wanted was published in May 2007.

Since 2006, Reese has primarily written in the pulp adventure genre. He has won numerous awards for his various series featuring heroes like Lazarus Gray, The Gravedigger and The Peregrine.

== Bibliography ==
=== The Peregrine series ===
- The Peregrine: Volume One Omnibus Edition (2015 re-release)
- The Peregrine: Volume Two Omnibus Edition (2016 re-release)
- The Peregrine: Volume Three Omnibus Edition (2016 re-release)

=== The Lazarus Gray series ===
- The Adventures of Lazarus Gray (2011)
- The Adventures of Lazarus Gray, Volume 2: Die Glocke (2012)
- The Adventures of Lazarus Gray, Volume 3: Eidolon (2013)
- The Adventures of Lazarus Gray, Volume 4: Satan's Circus (2014)
- The Adventures of Lazarus Gray, The Omnibus Edition (2014)
- The Adventures of Lazarus Gray, Volume 5 (2015)
- The Adventures of Lazarus Gray, Volume 6 (2017)
- The Adventures of Lazarus Gray, Volume 7 (2017)
- The Adventures of Lazarus Gray, Volume 8 (2020)
- The Adventures of Lazarus Gray, Volume 9 (2020)
- The Adventures of Lazarus Gray, Volume 10 (2021)

=== The Gravedigger series ===
- The Adventures of Gravedigger Volume One (2013)
- The Adventures of Gravedigger Volume Two (2014)
- The Adventures of Gravedigger Volume Three (2018)

=== Miscellaneous fiction ===
- The Conquerors of Shadow (2005)
- Legends of the Golden Age (2008)
- Tales of the Norse Gods (2009)
- Guan-Yin and the Horrors of Skull Island (2009)
- Savage Tales of Ki-Gor, Lord of the Jungle (2009)
- 818 (2009) - Reprints Guan-Yin and the Horrors of Skull Island as part of a larger anthology
- Rabbit Heart (2010)
- How the West Was Weird (2010)
- Mystery Men (And Women) Volume One (2010)
- The Damned Thing (2011)
- How the West Was Weird II (2011)
- The Green Hornet Casefiles (2011)
- The Avenger: Justice Inc. Files (2011)
- Rabbit Heart Pro Se Press Re-release (2013)
- The Damned Thing Pro Se Press Re-release (2014)
- Bishop and Hancock's Pulse Fiction (2014)
- Box Thirteen - Adventure Wanted! (2015)
- Legends of New Pulp Fiction (2015)
- Monster Aces (2016)
- Gotterdammerung (2016)
- Restless: An Anthology of Mummy Horror (2017)
- Captain Action: Cry of the Jungle Lord (2017)

=== Marvel Comics work ===
- Marvel Encyclopedia Vol. 5: The Marvel Knights (2004)
- Marvel Knights 2005 (2005)
- Spider-Man 2005 (2005)
- Ultimate Marvel Universe Fantastic Four and Spider-Man 2005 (2005)
- Horror 2005 (2005)
- Teams 2005 (2005)
- Marvel Monsters: From the Files of Ulysses Bloodstone (2005)
- New Avengers: Most Wanted (2005)
- All-New Official Handbook of the Marvel Universe (2006) - issues 1-7
- Marvel Legacy: The 1960s (2006)
- Marvel Legacy: The 1970s (2006)
- Marvel Legacy: The 1980s (2006)
- Marvel Monsters Hardcover (2006) - reprints the work from Marvel Monsters: From the Files of Ulyssess Bloodstone
- Ghost Rider: Finale (2007) - reprints the Dan Ketch entry from Marvel Knights 2006
- Marvel Legacy: The 1960s-1990s Handbook (2007) - reprints the individual 1960s, 1970s and 1980s volumes in a trade paperback format
- All-New Official Handbook Of The Marvel Universe A To Z (2008) - reprints the individual entries from the various Official Handbook oneshots and A-Z series

=== Roleplaying game work ===
- D6 Space: The Fires of Amatsumara (2006)
- Godsend Agenda: USER's Most Wanted (2007)

=== Miscellaneous nonfiction ===
- History of the Baldwin County Public Library (2008)
