= Lev Gleason Publications =

Canadian comic book publisher

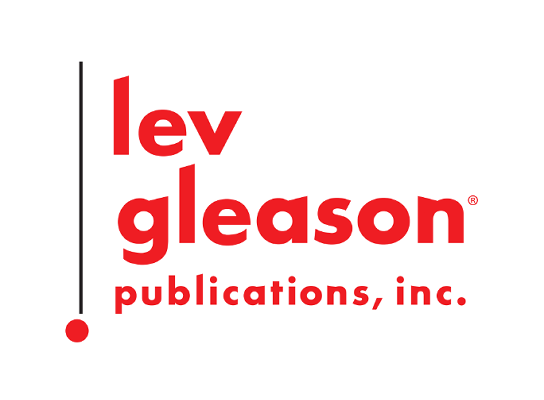
- Lev Gleason Publications logo, as of 2021.
- Founded: 1939; 2021 (Revived)
- Founder: Leverett Stone Gleason
- Defunct: 1956
- Country of origin: United States
- Headquarters location: Toronto, Ontario, Canada; Denton, Texas, US; Former: New York City
- Distribution: Diamond Comic Distributors; Ingram Content Group
- Key people: Lev Gleason; Fadi Hakim; Keith WTS Morris; Joseph Eastwood
- Publication types: Comic books Novels
- Fiction genres: Superhero, Action, Adventure, Horror, Fantasy
- Imprints: Comic House; Comic House Archives; New Friday; Lev Gleason Library

Lev Gleason Incorporated, formerly known as Lev Gleason Publishing, is a Canadian comic book company founded by Leverett Stone Gleason (1898–1971). They were the publisher of a number of popular comic books during the 1940s and early 1950s, including Daredevil Comics, Crime Does Not Pay, and Boy Comics. In 2021, Lev Gleason was revived by Fadi Hakim, and acquired the former Chapterhouse Comics and characters from Anglo-American Publishing.

== Background ==
Lev Gleason Publications was an influential comic book publisher active from the late 1930s to the mid-1950s. Founded by Leverett Stone Gleason, a pioneer in the comic book industry, the company was best known for its crime comics, particularly the best-selling series Crime Does Not Pay (1942–1955). Gleason began his publishing career after working with Charles Max Gaines at Eastern Color Printing, which played a significant role in the early days of comic books. He labelled some of his books ""illustories"" to suggest they were a new, unique form.

Gleason had a keen eye for talent, hiring notable creators such as Jack Cole and Charles Biro. Biro was instrumental in shaping the company’s creative direction. Gleason and Biro worked on various genres, including superhero, mystery, romance, comedy, western, and children's comics, reflecting their readership's diverse interests.

Gleason's career began in 1931 as an artist and advertising director for Open Road for Boys magazine. From 1932 to around 1934, he served as advertising manager under Harry Wildenberg at Eastern Color Printing, which became a comics-publishing pioneer in 1933 with the first American comic books. Gleason later worked as an editor at United Feature, where he launched Tip Top Comics in 1936. He then became business manager at Your Guide Publications, affiliated with Gilmor's Friday, Inc. and New Friday, Inc.

Around 1942, Gleason, then treasurer of New Friday, purchased the comic book series Silver Streak Comics and Daredevil Comics from the company. Under the imprint Comic House Inc., Gleason continued Silver Streak Comics with a crime comic, Crime Does Not Pay, which premiered with issue #22 in July 1942. That year, Gleason briefly published the left-wing political magazine Reader's Choice.

The success of Crime Does Not Pay led to numerous imitators and increased criticism of comic books' influence. This pressure resulted in the formation of the Association of Comics Magazine Publishers (ACMP) in 1948 to avoid external regulation, with Gleason as a founding member. The ACMP was the precursor to the Comics Code Authority, established in 1954.

In April 1949, Lev Gleason Publications, then located at 114 East 32nd Street in Manhattan, began publishing Tops, a comics magazine for adults. Despite its commercial success, Gleason's career was marked by controversy due to his progressive political views. As a member of the Communist Party in the 1930s, Gleason used his platform to promote social justice issues, making him a target during the post-WWII anti-communist campaigns, which contributed to the decline of his business.

Lev Gleason Publications went out of business in 1956. Its final publications were the teen-humor comic Jim Dandy #3 (Sept. 1956) and the children's Western comedy Shorty Shiner #3 (Oct. 1956), both published under the imprint Dandy Magazines Inc.

=== Revival ===
Lev Gleason Incorporated emerged as a new entity, spearheaded by Fadi Hakim, then CEO of Chapterhouse Comics. They introduced several imprints: Comic House, Comic House Archives, Lev Gleason Library, and New Friday. These imprints manage distribution through Diamond Comics, Diamond Books, and Ingram Content Group.

Lev Gleason Incorporated debuted in 2020 with the release of American Daredevil, a comprehensive biography of Lev Gleason published by Chapterhouse Publishing and authored by Brett Dakin, Gleason’s great-nephew. The biography delves into Gleason's life and his role as a progressive activist, drawing from family archives and FBI files.

The Lev Gleason Library, inspired by Gleason’s eponymous imprint, focuses on prose works. Its first release, Death Takes Centre Stage featuring Daredevil by D.K. Latta, was launched in April 2021.

New Friday serves as a platform for creator-owned books, paying homage to one of Lev Gleason’s early companies. The imprint debuted with HΩME Volume 1 by the Michaud Brothers.

=== Comic House ===
The Comic House universe is a continuation of the Chapterhouse "Chapterverse", which ended with Captain Canuck Season 4: Invasion. It introduced modern versions of iconic Lev Gleason golden age characters, including Captain Battle, Crimebuster, Silver Streak, and Daredevil. Many of the series deal with the fallout of the alien attack on Earth by the Borealis, the alien race who bestowed Captain Canuck his powers.

==== Characters and Creators ====
| Character | Debut | Modern Age Debut | Creator |
|---|---|---|---|
| Captain Battle | Silver Streak Comics #11 (as Jonathon Battle; May 1941) | Captain Battle Season 4 Issue 3 (as Juan Baca; September 2020) | Jack Binder & Carl Formes |
| Captain Battle Jr. | Captain Battle Jr. 001 (as William Battle; Fall 1943) | Captain Canuck Canada yDay Special 2018 (as Jesus "Chuy" Baca; Jul 2018) | Lev Gleason, Joseph Greene, & Don Rico |
| Black Diamond | Black Diamond Western #9 (as Bob Vale; March 1949) | Captain Canuck Season 5 Issue 0 (as Ruth West; January 2020) | William Overgard |
| Captain Canuck (Tom Evans) | Captain Canuck #1 (July 1975) | Captain Canuck Season 1 Issue 1 (May 2015) | Richard Comely & Ron Leishman |
| Captain Canuck (Darren Oak) | Captain Canuck: Reborn #0 (September 1993) | Captain Canuck Season 4 Issue 5 (November 2020) | Richard Comely |
| Captain Canuck (David Semple) | Captain Canuck: Unholy War #1 (October 2004) | West Coast Canuck Season 1 Issue 1 (December 2022) | Riel Langlois |
| The Claw | Silver Streak Comics #1 (December 1939) | Captain Canuck Year One Issue 1 (as Adriaan and Willem Cronje; May 2017); Captain Canuck Season 5 Issue 4 (as The Claw) | Jack Cole |
| Commander Steel | Grand Slam Comics Vol. 3 #9 (33), (August 1944) | Captain Canuck Season 1 Issue 1 (as Bryan Dwyer; May 2015); West Coast Canuck Season 1 Issue 4 (as Commander Steel) | Ted McCall and Ed Furness (Commander Steel); Kalman Andrasofszky (Bryan Dwyer) |
| Crimebuster (Chuck Chandler) | Boy Comics #3 (April 1942) | Captain Canuck Season 4 Issue 3 (September 2020) | Charles Biro & Bob Wood |
| Daredevil (Bart Hill) | Silver Streak Comics #6 (September 1940) | ""The Greatest Name in Comics"" Daredevil Season 1 Issue 1 (August 2022) | Jack Binder & Don Rico |
| Dr. Destine | Grand Slam Comics Vol 3 #10 (September 1944) | Fantomah Season 2 Issue 1 (January 2018) | Ed Furness |
| Fantomah | Jungle Comics #2 (February 1940) | Fantomah Season 1 Issue 1 (as Paz Gallegos; May 2017) | Fletcher Hanks |
| Freelance | Freelance Vol. 1 #1 (as Lance; July/August 1941) | Freelance Season 1 Issue 1 (as Lance Valiant; January 2017) | Ted McCall & Ed Furness |
| Lance Hale | Silver Streak Comics #2 (January 1940) | Freelance Season 2 Issue 3 | John Hampton |
| Northguard (Phil Wise) | New Triumph Featuring Northguard #1 (September 1984) | Captain Canuck Season 2 Issue 1 (February 2016) | Mark Shainblum & Gabriel Morrissette |
| Silver Streak | Silver Streak Comics #3 (March 1940) | Freelance Season 1 Issue 3 (as Harriet Sparks; March 2017) | Joe Simon & Jack Binder |
| Young Robinhood | Boy Comics #3 (as Billy Lackington; April 1942) | Crimebuster Season 1 Issue 2 (as Billy Lackington-Yung) | George Mandel |

== Personnel ==
- Fadi Hakim, Founder, Chief Executive Officer & Publisher
- Keith WTS Morris, Publisher & Editor-In-Chief
- Joseph Eastwood, Chief Financial Officer
- Frances Bell, Controller
- Tony White, Managing Editor
- Josh Rose, Senior Editor
- Rian Hughes, Trade Dress Design
- Cindy Leong, Production & Design
- Neil Rantala, Website & Social Media Manager, Design/Production
- Kevin King, Archives Director
- Morgan Wyatt, Funding Director
- Nader Arafat, Investor Relations
- Russell Brown, Licensing Director

=== Former ===
- Lev Gleason, Founder & President (1939–1956)
- E.A. Piller, Vice President (1945–1953)
- Charles Biro, Editorial Director, Chief Writer & Cover Artist (1941–1956)
- Gilbert G. Southwick, Advertising Director (1947–1948)
- Richard Comely, Editor-In-Chief, Creative Director (2015–2017)
- Kalman Andrasofszky, Editor-In-Chief (2015–2020)
- George Zotti, Chief Creative Officer, Retail Manager (2015–2017)
- Walter Durajlija, Executive Editor (2015–2017)
- Ryan Wilson, Design/Production (2015–2017)
- Andrew Wheeler, Director of Marketing (2017–2019)
- Jay Baruchel, Chief Creative Officer (2017–2020)
- Andrew Thomas, Social Media Manager & Fan Relations (2020–2024)

== Notable Contributors ==
- Ruth Atkinson (Boy Meets Girl, Boy Loves Girl)
- Jack Cole (The Claw, Daredevil)
- Jack Binder (Daredevil, Captain Battle, Silver Streak)
- Charles Biro (Crimebuster, Little Wise Guys)
- Fred Kida (Crime Does Not Pay, Boy Loves Girl)
- William Overgard (Black Diamond)
- Don Rico (Daredevil)
- Joe Simon (Silver Streak)
- Bob Wood (Crimebuster)
- Kalman Andrasofszky (Captain Canuck)
- Jay Baruchel (Captain Canuck)
- Leonard Kirk (Captain Canuck)
- Jason Loo (The Pitiful Human-Lizard)
- Van Jensen (Captain Canuck)

== List of Lev Gleason Publications titles ==
=== Comic House ===
- Captain Canuck (2015–Present)
  - Captain Canuck: Year One (2017)
- The Pitiful Human-Lizard (2015–2018)
- Northguard (2016–Present)
- Agents of P.A.C.T. (2017)
- Fantomah (2017–Present)
- Freelance (2017–Present)
- Fallen Suns (2017–Present)
- Canuck Beyond (2020–Present)
- Captain Battle (2020–Present)
- ""The Greatest Name in Comics"" Daredevil (2021 – Present)
- Silver Streak (2021 – Present)
- Equilibrium (2022 – Present)
- West Coast Canuck (2023 – Present)
- Crimebuster (2023 – Present)
- PACT Academy (Upcoming)
- Paradox Arms (Upcoming)
- Pirate Prince Sabre (Upcoming)
- The Deadly Dozen (Upcoming)
- Young Robinhood (Upcoming)
- Star Rise (Upcoming)
- Kane's Crusaders (Upcoming)
- Crime: The Casefiles of Dr. Destine (Upcoming)
- The Completely Ordinary Family Hale (Upcoming)

=== New Friday ===
- Fantomesque
- Hero Business Compendium
- 1903 Manhunt
- Red Leaves
- Frog Boy
- The Pursuer
- Scratcher
- The 5100
- Home
- The Fourth Planet
- Celery Stalks
- Minerva's Map
- Blood & Motor Oil
- Frankenaut
- Eki
- I Escaped a Chinese Internment Camp
- Pieces of Hate
- Overshare (Upcoming)
- Black Sheep (Upcoming)
- Good Bastard (Upcoming)
- Nash (Upcoming)

=== Lev Gleason Library ===
Non-Fiction

- American Daredevil: Comics, Communism, and the Battles of Lev Gleason (2021 Eisner nominated for Best Comics-Related Book)
- Charles Biro Legacy (Upcoming)

Fiction

- Death Takes Center Stage: A Lev Gleason Daredevil Novel
- The ""I"" of the Needle: A Captain Canuck Novel
- Deadly Waters: A Silver Streak Novel

=== Golden Age Archives ===
| Title | Vol. | Issues | Date | Notes | Source |
|---|---|---|---|---|---|
| Adventures in Wonderland | | # | | | |
| Black Diamond Western | | # | | | |
| Boy Comics [Boy Illustories] | | # | | | |
| Boy Loves Girl | | # | | | |
| Boy Meets Girl | | # | | | |
| Buster Crabbe | | # | | | |
| Capt. Battle Comics [Captain Battle Comics] | | # | | | |
| Captain Battle Jr. | | # | | | |
| Crime and Punishment | | # | | | |
| Crime Does Not Pay | | # | | | |
| Crime Does Not Pay 1953 (Annual) | | # | | | |
| Cutie Pie | | # | | | |
| Daredevil Comics | | # | | | |
| Desperado | | # | | | |
| Dilly | | # | | | |
| Dime Comics | | # | | | |
| Giant Boy Book of Comics | | # | | | |
| Horsefeathers | | # | | | |
| Jim Dandy | | # | | | |
| Lovers' Lane | | # | | | |
| Shorty Shiner | | # | | | |
| Silver Streak Comics | | # | | | |
| Slugger | | # | | | |
| Spooky Mysteries | | # | | | |
| Squeeks | | # | | | |
| Tops | 1 | #1-2 | July 1949 - September 1949 | Imprints: Top Magazine Inc. | |
| Uncle Charlie's Fables | 1 | #1- 5 | January-February 1952 - September-October 1952 | Adapted from an index by Sam Kujava. | |

== Lev Gleason Studios ==
=== Web Series ===
Captain Canuck: The Web Series
The first season was a 5-part series that debuted on July 1, 2013 and featured Captain Cancuk (Kris Holden-Ried), aided by Redcoat (Tatiana Maslany) and Horse Wilson (Mark Meer) attempting to defeat Mr. Gold (Paul Amos) and Bluefox (Laura Vandervoort). The series featured cameos by Richard Comely and Ajay Fry.

A second season debuted on February 14, 2016, but only lasted a single episode and was left on a cliffhanger.

Illustories
Illustories is a series of motion comics featuring Captain Canuck, Daredevil, Silver Streak, and Crimebuster.

=== Television series ===
==== Animated ====
Camp Canuck
Camp Canuck is an upcoming animated series that is a reimagining of the Comic House Universe as a summer camp for the world's future heroes and villains, with Captain Canuck and Mr. Gold as camp councillors. The project will be produced along with Little Blackstone Studios and Big Studios.

==== Live-action ====
Several live-action television shows are currently in production including Captain Canuck, Freelance, and Fantomah.

=== Films ===
Going In
Going In was released in 2023 and starred Ira Goldman and Evan Rissi, who also directed it. Two former best friends, Leslie and Reuben, are forced to reconnect when their city is flooded with a dangerous new drug, compelling them to infiltrate a deadly underground network to survive.

Upcoming
Two upcoming films are in production based on the New Friday books The Pursuer and Red Leaves.
