= Bob Wood (comics) =

- Born: June 14, 1917 Boston, Massachusetts, U.S.
- Died: 7 November 1966 (aged 49) New York City, New York, U.S.
- Notable works: Crime Does Not Pay
- Collaborators: Charles Biro; Lev Gleason

Robert L. Wood (June 14, 1917 – November 7, 1966) was an American comics illustrator. Wood worked for the Harry "A" Chesler Company and provided art for multiple companies, including MLJ Magazines and Lev Gleason Publications. In 1942, Wood and Charles Biro co-created Crime Does Not Pay, a series largely credited with beginning the "crime comics" trend in the industry. Wood's personal life was marred by drinking and gambling addictions, and he served a total of three years and eight months in prison between 1958 and 1963 for manslaughter. A few years after his release, Wood was struck by a car and killed.

== Career profile ==
According to David Hajdu's The Ten-Cent Plague: The Great Comic Book Scare and How It Changed America, Wood was "[u]nderstood to have grown up in blue-collar South Boston", but he "rarely discussed his background or life outside of comics." Wood worked for the Harry "A" Chesler Group, which provided artwork for Lev Gleason Publications, MLJ Magazines, and Novelty Press. In 1942, Wood left the Chesler Group and went to work full-time for Gleason, where he co-created Crime Does Not Pay with Charles Biro, serving as editor and sometimes artist. Crime Does Not Pay would go on to become one of the best-selling crime comics in history, and was credited as the title that pushed the comics industry toward darker, crime-oriented titles.

== Manslaughter charge and death ==
In 1958, after the cancellation of Crime Does Not Pay, Wood's drinking and gambling problems worsened, culminating in his arrest for manslaughter. After spending several days with a prostitute in a Gramercy Park hotel, Wood beat and killed her in an argument. After hailing a taxi, Wood told the driver, "I'm in terrible trouble. I'm going to get a couple of hours sleep and jump in the river." The cabbie responded "What happened? Did you kill somebody?", to which Wood replied "Yes, I killed a woman who was giving me a bad time in Room 91 of the Irving Hotel. Why don't you call someone at a newspaper and make yourself a few dollars?". The cabbie reported Wood's actions to the police, who arrested him at his Greenwich Village residential hotel. According to Joe Simon's account of the murder, "Wood's clothes were so bloodied, police borrowed a pair of pants from the hotel manager to take Wood in for questioning." Wood was sentenced to three years in prison for first-degree (voluntary) manslaughter. He was paroled after two years and eight months, then arrested six months later on a parole violation, finally being released for good in July 1963. Three years after his release from prison, he was struck by a car while attempting to cross the Garden State Parkway.
