= Golden Age of Comic Books =

Era of American comic books (1938–1956)

- Superman, catalyst of the Golden Age: Superman #14 (Feb. 1942); Cover art by Fred Ray
- Time span: 1938 – 1956

Related periods
- Preceded by: Platinum Age of Comic Books (1897–1938)
- Followed by: Silver Age of Comic Books (1956–1970)

The Golden Age of Comic Books describes an era in the history of American comic books from 1938 to 1956. During this time, modern comic books were first published and rapidly increased in popularity. The superhero archetype was created and many well-known characters were introduced, including Superman, Batman, Robin, Captain Marvel, Captain America, and Wonder Woman.

== Etymology ==
The first recorded use of the term "Golden Age" was by Richard A. Lupoff in an article, "Re-Birth", published in issue one of the fanzine Comic Art in April 1960.

== History ==
An event cited by many as marking the beginning of the Golden Age was the 1938 debut of Superman in Action Comics #1, published by Detective Comics (predecessor of DC Comics). Superman's popularity helped make comic books a major arm of publishing, which led rival companies to create superheroes of their own to emulate Superman's success.

=== World War II ===
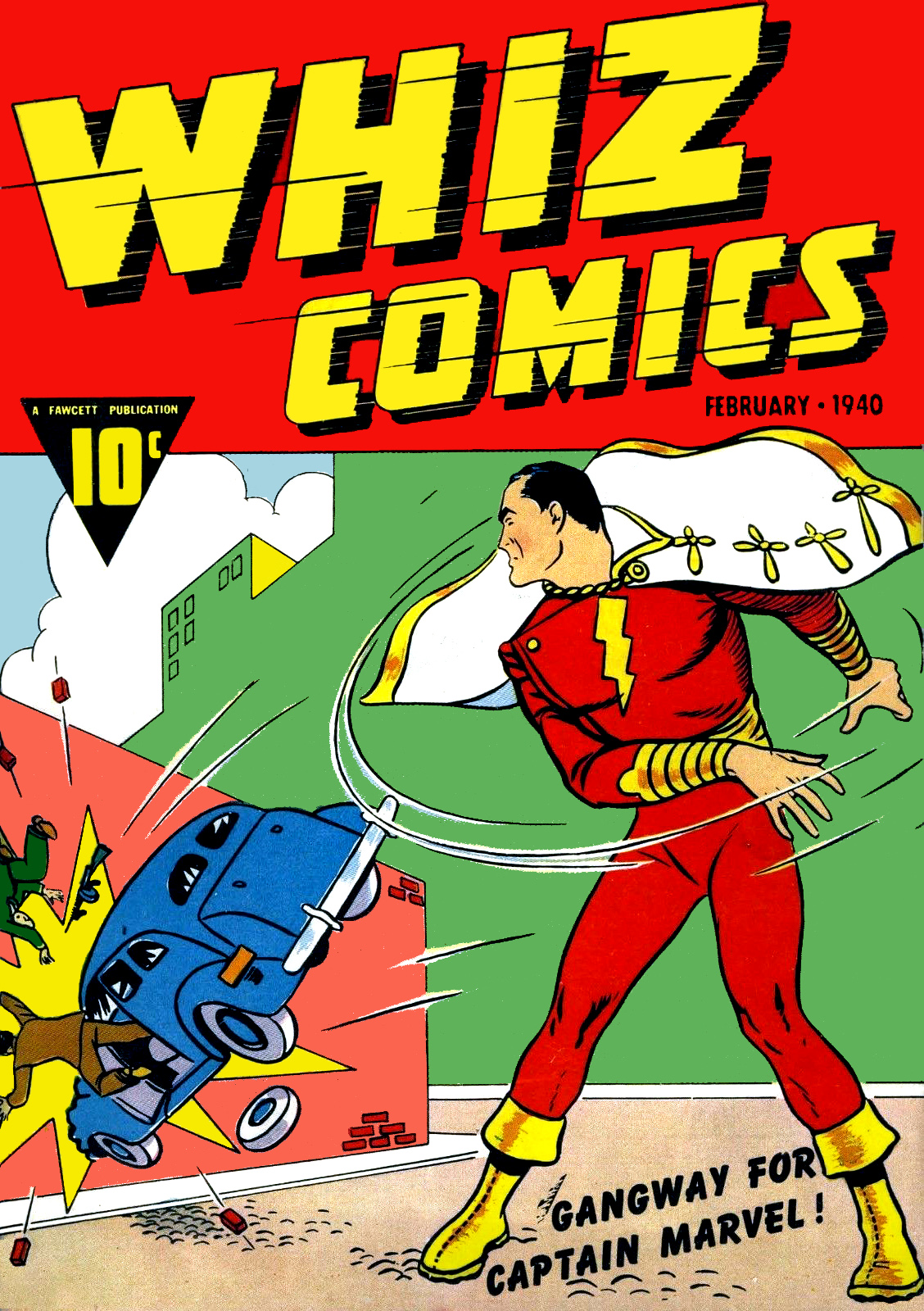
Whiz Comics #2 (Feb. 1940), with the first appearance of Captain Marvel Cover art by C. C. Beck

Between 1939 and 1941 Detective Comics and its sister company, All-American Publications, introduced popular superheroes such as Batman and Robin, Wonder Woman, The Flash, Green Lantern, Doctor Fate, the Atom, Hawkman, Green Arrow and Aquaman. Timely Comics, the 1940s predecessor of Marvel Comics, had million-selling titles featuring the Human Torch, the Sub-Mariner, and Captain America. Although DC and Timely characters are well remembered today, circulation figures suggest that the best-selling superhero title of the era was Fawcett Comics' Captain Marvel Adventures with sales of about 1.4 million copies per issue. The comic was published biweekly at one point to capitalize on its popularity. Another notable series was The Spirit by Will Eisner, which deviated from the usual publishing model of the period as a weekly multi-page supplement in the Register and Tribune Syndicate newspapers for which Eisner held the copyright, a rare consideration for creators of that period.

Patriotic heroes donning red, white, and blue were particularly popular during the time of the Second World War following the Shield's debut in 1940. Many heroes of this time period battled the Axis powers, with covers such as Captain America Comics #1 (cover-dated March 1941) showing the title character punching Nazi leader Adolf Hitler.

As comic books grew in popularity, publishers began launching titles that expanded into a variety of genres. Dell Comics' non-superhero characters (particularly the licensed Walt Disney animated-character comics) outsold the superhero comics of the day. The publisher featured licensed movie and literary characters such as Mickey Mouse, Donald Duck, Roy Rogers and Tarzan. It was during this era that noted Donald Duck writer-artist Carl Barks rose to prominence. Additionally, MLJ's introduction of Archie Andrews in Pep Comics #22 (December 1941) gave rise to teen humor comics, with the Archie Andrews character remaining in print well into the 21st century.

At the same time in Canada, American comic books were prohibited importation under the War Exchange Conservation Act, which restricted the importation of non-essential goods. Canadian publishers responded to this lack of competition by producing titles of their own, informally called the Canadian Whites. While these titles flourished during the war, they did not survive the lifting of trade restrictions afterwards.

=== Post-war and shift from superheroes ===
The term Atomic Age of Comic Books is sometimes used to describe a brief time period, starting with either the end of World War II in 1945 or in 1948 with the first outcry of Fredric Wertham, and lasting until the mid-1950s. Some authors consider this an interregnum period or an era in its own right, but most regard it as still part of the Golden Age. During this time, the popularity of superhero comics waned. To retain reader interest, comic publishers diversified into other genres, such as war, Westerns, science fiction, romance, crime and horror. Many superhero titles were canceled or converted to other genres.

In 1946, DC Comics' Superboy, Aquaman and Green Arrow were switched from More Fun Comics into Adventure Comics so More Fun could focus on humor. In 1948 All-American Comics, featuring Green Lantern, Johnny Thunder and Dr. Mid-Nite, was replaced with All-American Western. The following year, Flash Comics and Green Lantern were canceled. In 1951 All Star Comics, featuring the Justice Society of America, became All-Star Western. The next year Star Spangled Comics, featuring Robin, was retitled Star Spangled War Stories. Sensation Comics, featuring Wonder Woman, was canceled in 1953. The only superhero comics published continuously through the entire 1950s were Action Comics, Adventure Comics, Batman, Detective Comics, Superboy, Superman, Wonder Woman and World's Finest Comics. Plastic Man appeared in Quality Comics' Police Comics until 1950, when its focus switched to detective stories; his solo title continued bimonthly until issue 52, cover-dated February 1955.

Timely Comics' The Human Torch was canceled with issue #35 (March 1949) and Marvel Mystery Comics, featuring the Human Torch, with issue #93 (Aug. 1949) became the horror comic Marvel Tales. Sub-Mariner Comics was canceled with issue #42 (June 1949) and Captain America Comics, by then Captain America's Weird Tales, with #75 (Feb. 1950). Harvey Comics' Black Cat was canceled in 1951 and rebooted as a horror comic later that year—the title would change to Black Cat Mystery, Black Cat Mystic, and eventually Black Cat Western for the final two issues, which included Black Cat stories. Lev Gleason Publications' Daredevil was edged out of his title by the Little Wise Guys in 1950. Fawcett Comics' Whiz Comics, Master Comics and Captain Marvel Adventures were canceled in 1953, and The Marvel Family was canceled the following year.

Also during this period, the mass media with the advent of television were forcing media companies to put out comics that reflected the popular culture of the time period. Comic books focused on space, mystery, and suspense that television and other forms of media were turning to in the march toward scientific progress. According to historian Michael A. Amundson, appealing comic-book characters helped ease young readers' fear of nuclear war and neutralize anxiety about the questions posed by atomic power. It was during this period that long-running humor comics debuted, including EC Comics' series Mad and Dell's series Uncle Scrooge (both in 1952).

=== End of the era ===
In 1953, the comic book industry hit a setback when the United States Senate Subcommittee on Juvenile Delinquency was created in order to investigate the problem of juvenile delinquency. After the publication of Fredric Wertham's Seduction of the Innocent the following year that claimed comics sparked illegal behavior among minors, comic book publishers such as EC's William Gaines were subpoenaed to testify in public hearings. As a result, the Comics Code Authority was created by the Association of Comics Magazine Publishers to enact self-censorship by comic book publishers. At this time, EC canceled its crime and horror titles and focused primarily on Mad. The Silver Age of Comic Books is recognized by some as beginning with the debut of the first successful new superhero since the Golden Age, DC Comics' new Flash, in Showcase #4 (Oct. 1956).

== See also ==
- Silver Age of Comic Books
- Bronze Age of Comic Books
- Modern Age of Comic Books
- List of Golden Age comics publishers
- List of Marvel Comics Golden Age characters
- Golden Age of Science Fiction
