= 1943 in comics =

Notable events of 1943 in comics.

== Events and publications ==
=== January ===
- January 24: Milton Caniff's Male Call makes its debut. It will run until 3 March 1946.
- Action Comics (1938 series) #56 - DC Comics
- Adventure Comics (1938 series) #82 - DC Comics
- Air Fighters Comics (1941 series) #4 - Hillman Periodicals
- All-American Comics (1939 series) #46 - DC Comics
- All-Flash (1941 series) #8, previously quarterly - DC Comics
- All-Winners Comics (1941 series) #7 - Timely Comics
- Captain Aero Comics (1941 series) #10 - Holyoke Publishing
- Captain America Comics (1941 series) #22 - Timely Comics
- Cat-Man Comics (1941 series) #17 - Holyoke Publishing
- Crack Comics (1940 series) #27 marks the debut of Captain Triumph. - Quality Comics
- Detective Comics (1937 series) #71 - DC Comics
- Flash Comics (1940 series) #37 - DC Comics
- Gene Autry Comics (1941 series) #4 - Fawcett Comics
- Human Torch Comics (1940 series) #10 - Timely Comics
- Joker Comics (1942 series) #6 - Timely Comics
- Krazy Komics (1942 series) #5 - Timely Comics
- Marvel Mystery Comics (1939 series) #39 - Timely Comics
- More Fun Comics (1936 series) #87 - DC Comics
- Sensation Comics (1942 series) #13 - DC Comics
- Star Spangled Comics (1941 series) #16 - DC Comics
- Superman (1939 series) #20 - DC Comics
- Target Comics (1942 series) #11 - Novelty Press
- Young Allies Comics (1941 series) #6 - Timely Comics

=== February ===
- February 19: Hergé's Tintin story Red Rackham's Treasure is prepublished in Le Soir.
- Edgar P. Jacobs draws Le Rayon U in Bravo magazine, which is the first Belgian science fiction comic.
- Action Comics (1938 series) #57 - DC Comics
- Adventure Comics (1938 series) #83 - DC Comics
- Air Fighters Comics (1941 series) #5 - Hillman Periodicals
- All-American Comics (1939 series) #47 - DC Comics
- All-Star Comics (1940 series) #15 - DC Comics
- Batman (1940 series) #15 - DC Comics
- Captain America Comics (1941 series) #23 - Timely Comics
- Detective Comics (1937 series) #72 - DC Comics
- Flash Comics (1940 series) #38 - DC Comics
- Gene Autry Comics (1941 series) #5 - Fawcett Comics
- Joker Comics (1942 series) #7 - Timely Comics
- Marvel Mystery Comics (1939 series) #40 - Timely Comics
- More Fun Comics (1936 series) #88 - DC Comics
- Sensation Comics (1942 series) #14 - DC Comics
- Star Spangled Comics (1941 series) #17 - DC Comics
- Target Comics (1942 series) #12 - Novelty Press
- U.S.A. Comics (1941 series) #7 - Timely Comics

=== March ===
- March 4–5: Halfway the Tintin story Red Rackham's Treasure Professor Calculus makes his debut.
- Action Comics (1938 series) #58 - DC Comics
- Adventure Comics (1938 series) #84 - DC Comics
- Air Fighters Comics (1941 series) #6 - Hillman Periodicals
- All-American Comics (1939 series) #48 - DC Comics
- All-Flash (1941 series) #9, previously quarterly - DC Comics
- Captain America Comics (1941 series) #24 - Timely Comics
- Crack Comics (1940 series) #28 - Quality Comics
- Detective Comics (1937 series) #73 - DC Comics
- Flash Comics (1940 series) #39 - DC Comics
- Gene Autry Comics (1941 series) #6 - Fawcett Comics
- Marvel Mystery Comics (1939 series) #41 - Timely Comics
- More Fun Comics (1936 series) #89 - DC Comics
- Sensation Comics (1942 series) #15 - DC Comics
- Star Spangled Comics (1941 series) #18 - DC Comics
- Target Comics (1943 series) #1 - Novelty Press
- Superman (1939 series) #21 - DC Comics

=== Spring Issue ===
- World's Finest Comics (1941 series) #9 - DC Comics

=== April ===
- René Bonnet's comic strip Fripounet debuts in the magazine Lettres aux Jeunes. The boy character Fripounet will receive a female friend in 1945, named Marisette.
- Action Comics (1938 series) #59 - DC Comics
- Adventure Comics (1938 series) #85 - DC Comics
- Air Fighters Comics (1941 series) #7 - Hillman Periodicals
- All-American Comics (1939 series) #49 - DC Comics
- All-Star Comics (1940 series) #16 - DC Comics
- All-Winners Comics (1941 series) #8 - Timely Comics
- Batman (1940 series) #16: marks the debut of Batman's faithful butler Alfred Pennyworth. - DC Comics
- Captain America Comics (1941 series) #25 - Timely Comics
- Detective Comics (1937 series) #74 - DC Comics
- Flash Comics (1940 series) #40 - DC Comics
- Gene Autry Comics (1941 series) #7 - Fawcett Comics
- Human Torch Comics (1940 series) #11 - Timely Comics
- Joker Comics (1942 series) #8 - Timely Comics
- Marvel Mystery Comics (1939 series) #42 - Timely Comics
- More Fun Comics (1936 series) #90 - DC Comics
- Sensation Comics (1942 series) #16 - DC Comics
- Star Spangled Comics (1941 series) #19 - DC Comics
- Sub-Mariner Comics (1941 series) #9 - Timely Comics
- Target Comics (1943 series) #2 - Novelty Press
- U.S.A. Comics (1941 series) #8 - Timely Comics
- Young Allies Comics (1941 series) #7 - Timely Comics

=== May ===
- May 10: Jack Sparling's Claire Voyant makes its debut. It will run until 1948.
- May 16: The final issue of the Italian comics magazine L'Avventuroso is published.
- Action Comics (1938 series) #60 - DC Comics
- Air Fighters Comics (1941 series) #8 - Hillman Periodicals
- All-Flash (1941 series) #10, previously quarterly - DC Comics
- Captain America Comics (1941 series) #26 - Timely Comics
- Crack Comics (1940 series) #29 - Quality Comics
- Detective Comics (1937 series) #75 - DC Comics
- Flash Comics (1940 series) #41 - DC Comics
- Gene Autry Comics (1941 series) #8 - Fawcett Comics
- Marvel Mystery Comics (1939 series) #43 - Timely Comics
- More Fun Comics (1936 series) #91 - DC Comics
- Sensation Comics (1942 series) #17 - DC Comics
- Star Spangled Comics (1941 series) #20 - DC Comics
- Superman (1939 series) #22 - DC Comics
- Target Comics (1943 series) #3 - Novelty Press

=== June ===
- June 20: Harry Haenigsen's Penny makes its debut. It will run until 1970.
- Action Comics (1938 series) #61 - DC Comics
- Adventure Comics (1938 series) #86 - DC Comics
- Air Fighters Comics (1941 series) #9 - Hillman Periodicals
- All-American Comics (1939 series) #50 - DC Comics
- All-Star Comics (1940 series) #17 - DC Comics
- All-Winners Comics (1941 series) #9 - Timely Comics
- Batman (1940 series) #17 - DC Comics
- Captain America Comics (1941 series) #27 - Timely Comics
- Detective Comics (1937 series) #76 - DC Comics
- Flash Comics (1940 series) #42 - DC Comics
- Human Torch Comics (1940 series) #12 - Timely Comics
- Joker Comics (1942 series) #9 - Timely Comics
- Marvel Mystery Comics (1939 series) #44 - Timely Comics
- Sensation Comics (1942 series) #18 - DC Comics
- Star Spangled Comics (1941 series) #21 - DC Comics
- Sub-Mariner Comics (1941 series) #10 - Timely Comics
- Target Comics (1943 series) #4 - Novelty Press

=== Summer Issue ===
- World's Finest Comics (1941 series) #10 - DC Comics

=== July ===
- July 4: Jimmy Hatlo's Little Iodine receives her own spin-off comic. It will run until 1985.
- July 18: Kathleen O'Brien's Wanda the War Girl first appears in print.
- July 24:
  - Steve Dowling's Garth makes its debut. It will run until 22 March 1997.
  - Gilbert Lawford Dalton and Jack Glass's Wilson the Wonder Athlete makes its debut.
- July 26: Bombing of Hanover in World War II: During Allied bombings of the city center of Hanover the Wilhelm Busch Museum is destroyed, but it will be rebuilt after the war.
- July: In Walt Disney's Comics and Stories, Good deeds, by Carl Barks; debut of Neighbor Jones (the character gets his definitive shape four month later, in the story Good Neighbours).
- July: Helnit Publishing regains the publishing rights for Captain Aero Comics and Cat-Man Comics from Holyoke Publishing.
- Action Comics (1938 series) #62 - DC Comics
- Air Fighters Comics (1941 series) #10 - Hillman Periodicals
- All-American Comics (1939 series) #51 - DC Comics
- All-Flash (1941 series) #11, previously quarterly - DC Comics
- Captain America Comics (1941 series) #28 - Timely Comics
- Cat-Man Comics (1941 series) #18 - Helnit Publishing
- Detective Comics (1937 series) #77 - DC Comics
- Flash Comics (1940 series) #43 - DC Comics
- Gene Autry Comics (1941 series) #9 - Fawcett Comics
- Jolly Jingles #10 - MLJ Comics - marks the debut of Al Fagaly's Super Duck.
- Marvel Mystery Comics (1939 series) #45 - Timely Comics
- More Fun Comics (1936 series) #92 - DC Comics
- Sensation Comics (1942 series) #19 - DC Comics
- Star Spangled Comics (1941 series) #22 - DC Comics
- Superman (1939 series) #23 - DC Comics
- U.S.A. Comics (1941 series) #9 - Timely Comics
- Wonder Woman (1942 series) #5 - DC Comics: marks the debut of the villain Doctor Psycho.
- Young Allies Comics (1941 series) #8 - Timely Comics

=== August ===
- Action Comics (1938 series) #63 - DC Comics
- Adventure Comics (1938 series) #87 - DC Comics
- Air Fighters Comics (1941 series) #11 - Hillman Periodicals
- All-Star Comics (1940 series) #18 - DC Comics
- Batman (1940 series) #18 - DC Comics
- Captain America Comics (1941 series) #29 - Timely Comics
- Crack Comics (1940 series) #30 - Quality Comics
- Detective Comics (1937 series) #78 - DC Comics
- Flash Comics (1940 series) #44 - DC Comics
- Joker Comics (1942 series) #10 - Timely Comics
- Marvel Mystery Comics (1939 series) #46 - Timely Comics
- Sensation Comics (1942 series) #20 - DC Comics
- Star Spangled Comics (1941 series) #23 - DC Comics
- Target Comics (1943 series) #5 - Novelty Press

=== September ===
- September 10: The final episode of the Italian comics magazine Bertoldo is published.
- September 27: In Bob Karp and Al Taliaferro's Donald Duck comic strip Grandma Duck makes her debut as a character (before she had only been seen in a framed picture, on 11 August 1940).
- Action Comics (1938 series) #64, with Toyman vs Superman - DC Comics
- Air Fighters Comics (1941 series) #12 - Hillman Periodicals
- All-American Comics (1939 series) #52 - DC Comics
- All-Winners Comics (1941 series) #10 - Timely Comics
- Captain Aero Comics (1941 series) #11 - Helnit Publishing
- Captain America Comics (1941 series) #30 - Timely Comics
- Cat-Man Comics (1941 series) #19 - Helnit Publishing
- Detective Comics (1937 series) #79 - DC Comics
- Flash Comics (1940 series) #45 - DC Comics
- Gene Autry Comics (1941 series) #10 - Fawcett Comics
- Marvel Mystery Comics (1939 series) #47 - Timely Comics
- More Fun Comics (1936 series) #93 - DC Comics
- Sensation Comics (1942 series) #21 - DC Comics
- Star Spangled Comics (1941 series) #24 - DC Comics
- Sub-Mariner Comics (1941 series) #11 - Timely Comics
- Superman (1939 series) #24 - DC Comics
- U.S.A. Comics (1941 series) #10 - Timely Comics
- Young Allies Comics (1941 series) #9 - Timely Comics

=== Fall Issue ===
- All-Flash (1941 series) #12, previously quarterly - DC Comics
- World's Finest Comics (1941 series) #11 - DC Comics

=== October ===
- October 4: Alfred Andriola and Allen Saunders' Kerry Drake makes its debut. It will run until 1983.
- October 17: In an episode of Milton Caniff's Terry and the Pirates Filip Corkin gives a patriotic speech about comradery in the U.S. army. The next day politician John Carl Hinshaw reads it to the Congressional Record. The page becomes a classic and will often be reprinted.
- October 23: Péricles de Andrade Maranhão, a.k.a. Péricles, launches the comic strip O Amigo da Onça.
- Action Comics (1938 series) #65 - DC Comics
- Adventure Comics (1938 series) #88 - DC Comics
- Air Fighters Comics (1941 series) #13 - Hillman Periodicals
- All-American Comics (1939 series) #53 - DC Comics
- All-Star Comics (1940 series) #19 - DC Comics
- Batman (1940 series) #19 - DC Comics
- Captain America Comics (1941 series) #31 - Timely Comics
- Cat-Man Comics (1941 series) #20 - Helnit Publishing
- Crack Comics (1940 series) #31 - Quality Comics
- Detective Comics (1937 series) #80 - DC Comics
- Flash Comics (1940 series) #46 - DC Comics
- Human Torch Comics (1940 series) #13 - Timely Comics
- Joker Comics (1942 series) #11 - Timely Comics
- Marvel Mystery Comics (1939 series) #48 - Timely Comics
- Sensation Comics (1942 series) #22 - DC Comics
- Star Spangled Comics (1941 series) #25 - DC Comics
- Target Comics (1943 series) #6 - Novelty Press

=== November ===
- November 1: The first episode of Roy Crane's Buz Sawyer is published. It will run until 21 April 1979.
- The first episode of Albert Chartier's newspaper comic Onésime is published, continuously for 59 years, until 2002.
- The final issue of the Italian comics magazine Giornale dei Ragazzi is published.
- Action Comics (1938 series) #66 - DC Comics
- Air Fighters Comics (1941 series) #14 - Hillman Periodicals
- All-Winners Comics (1941 series) #11 - Timely Comics
- Captain Aero Comics (1941 series) #12 - Helnit Publishing
- Captain America Comics (1941 series) #32 - Timely Comics
- Cat-Man Comics (1941 series) #21 - Helnit Publishing
- Detective Comics (1937 series) #81 - DC Comics
- Flash Comics (1940 series) #47 - DC Comics
- Joker Comics (1942 series) #12 - Timely Comics
- Marvel Mystery Comics (1939 series) #49 - Timely Comics marks the debut of Otto Binder and Al Gabriele's Miss America.
- More Fun Comics (1936 series) #94 - DC Comics
- Sensation Comics (1942 series) #23 - DC Comics
- Star Spangled Comics (1941 series) #26 - DC Comics
- Sub-Mariner Comics (1941 series) #12 - Timely Comics
- Superman (1939 series) #25 - DC Comics
- Target Comics (1943 series) #7 - Novelty Press
- In Walt Disney’s Comics and stories, Panchito, by Kent Hultgren; debut in comics of Panchito Pistoles.

=== December ===
- December 21: In Chester Gould's Dick Tracy the villain Flattop makes his debut.
- December 26: Joseph Hughes Newton's Tullus makes its debut. It will run until 1976.
- December: Gene Autry Comics publisher changes from Fawcett to Dell Comics.
- Action Comics (1938 series) #67 - DC Comics
- Adventure Comics (1938 series) #89 - DC Comics
- Air Fighters Comics (1941 series) #15 - Hillman Periodicals
- All-American Comics (1939 series) #54 - DC Comics
- All-Star Comics (1940 series) #20 - DC Comics
- Batman (1940 series) #20 - DC Comics
- Captain America Comics (1941 series) #33 - Timely Comics
- Cat-Man Comics (1941 series) #22 - Helnit Publishing
- Crack Comics (1940 series) #32 - Quality Comics
- Detective Comics (1937 series) #82 - DC Comics
- Flash Comics (1940 series) #48 - DC Comics
- Gene Autry Comics (1941 series) #11 - Dell Comics
- Joker Comics (1942 series) #13 - Timely Comics
- Marvel Mystery Comics (1939 series) #50 - Timely Comics
- Sensation Comics (1942 series) #24 - DC Comics
- Star Spangled Comics (1941 series) #27 - DC Comics
- Suspense Comics (1943 series) #1 - Et-Es-Go Magazines
- Target Comics (1943 series) #8 - Novelty Press
- Young Allies Comics (1941 series) #10 - Timely Comics

=== Winter Issue ===
- All-Flash (1941 series) #13, previously quarterly - DC Comics
- World's Finest Comics (1941 series) #12 - DC Comics

== Births ==
=== January ===
- January 7: Liz Berube, American comics artist and colorist, known for romance comics, (d. 2021).
- January 29: Steve Skeates, American comic writer (DC Comics, Marvel Comics, Charlton Comics), (d. 2023).

=== November ===
- November 11: Dave Cockrum, American comics artist (X-Men, The Avengers, Superboy), (d. 2006).

=== Specific date unknown ===
- Asher Dikstein, Israeli comic artist (The Spaceship of Time, Mysteries of the Lost Continent), (d. 2021).

== Deaths ==
=== January ===
- January 28: Eddie Eks, American comics artist, dies at age 60.

=== March ===
- March 3:
  - Otto Luihn, Norwegian journalist, poet and comics writer (Sjur Sjursen vil bli kapitalist), dies from heart failure at age 52.
  - Karóly Mühlbeck, Slovakian-Hungarian painter, graphic artist, caricaturist and comics artist (Mühlbeck headlines), dies at age 73.
- March 28: Pete Llanuza, American comics artist (Jack Ofalltrades, continued Joe Jinks), dies at age 70.

=== April ===
- April 3: Joe Cunningham, American actor, sports writer and comics artist (Rufus McGoofus), dies at age 52 from coronary disease.
- April 9: Felix Hess, Dutch illustrator, painter, etcher and comics artist (Uit Het Kladschrift van Jantje, De Wonderlijke Reis van Jan Klaassen, De Ongelooflijke Avonturen van Bram Vingerling, Uit Mijn Kladboek), dies at age 64 in concentration camp Sobibor.
- April 26: Frank Ladendorf, a.k.a. Lads, American comics artist (Posey County, Farmer Oatcake, Mischievous Willie, Herr Toughluck Dotty Dimple, The Joys and Sorrows of Mister and Mrs. Newlywed), dies at age 82.

=== June ===
- June 16: Nicholas Afonsky, Russian-American comics artist (continued Minute Movies, Little Annie Rooney and Secret Agent X-9), dies at age 51.

=== July ===
- July 8: Jean Moulin, French resistance fighter and cartoonist, dies at age 44, after being captured by the Gestapo.

=== September ===
- September 14: John R. Neill, American illustrator and comics artist (Life Among the Macaronis, The Fate of a Crown, Children's Stories That Never Grow Old, The Little Journeys of Nip and Tuck), dies at age 65.

=== October ===
- October 10: Charlotte Salomon, German painter and comics artist (Leben? oder Theater?: Ein Singspiel), is gassed to death in Auschwitz at age 26.
- October 18: A.M. de Jong, Dutch novelist and comics writer (Bulletje en Boonestaak) is murdered by two SS soldiers at age 55.

=== December ===
- December 29: Enrico Novelli, a.k.a. Yambo, Italian journalist, writer, illustrator and comics artist, dies at age 69.

=== Specific date unknown ===
- Herbert Sydney Foxwell, British comics artist (continued The Bruin Boys (better known as Tiger Tim) and Teddy Tail, created The Bunty Boys), dies at age 52 or 53.
- Worden Wood, American comics artist (ghostdrew Buster Brown), dies at age 62 or 63.

== First issues by title ==
- Suspense Comics (December) - Et-Es-Go Magazines

== Initial appearances by character name ==
- Alfred Beagle in Batman #18 (April), created by Bob Kane, Bill Finger and Jerry Robinson - DC Comics
- Henry King in All Star Comics #15 (February), created by Gardner Fox and Joe Gallagher - DC Comics
- Captain Triumph in Crack Comics #27 (January), Created by Alfred Andriola - DC Comics
- Cavalier in Detective Comics #81 (November), created by Don Cameron and Bob Kane - DC Comics
- Cheetah in Wonder Woman #06 (Fall Issue), William Moulton Marston - DC Comics
- Crime Doctor in Detective Comics #77 (July), created by Bill Finger and Bob Kane - DC Comics
- Doctor Psycho in Wonder Woman #5 (July), created by William Moulton Marston and Harry G. Peter - DC Comics
- King Bee in All-Star Comics #18 (August), created by Gardner Fox - DC Comics
- Sabbac in Captain Marvel Jr. #4 (July), created by Otto Binder and Al Carreno - DC Comics
- Thinker in All Flash #12 (September), created by Gardner Fox and E.E. Hibbard - DC Comics
- Toyman in Action Comics #64 (September), created by Don Cameron and Ed Dobrotka - DC Comics
- Tweedledum and Tweedledee in Detective Comics #74 (April), created by Bob Kane, Don Cameron and Jerry Robinson - DC Comics
- Uncle Marvel in Wow Comics #18 (October), created by Otto Binder and Marc Swayze - DC Comics
- Vandal Savage in Green Lantern #10 (December), created by Alfred Bester and Martin Nodell - DC Comics
