= 1944 in comics =

Notable events of 1944 in comics.

== Events and publications ==
=== Year overall ===
- EC Comics was established by Max Gaines.

=== January ===
- January 1: Debut of Dudley D. Watkins' Jimmy and his Magic Patch in The Beano.
- January 19: Marten Toonder's Tom Poes story De Superfilm-onderneming is first published. Halfway through the story, the antagonists Bul Super and Hiep Hieper make their debut.
- Captain Aero Comics (1941 series) #13 - Helnit Publishing
- Captain America Comics (1941 series) #34 - Timely Comics
- Human Torch Comics (1940 series) #14 - Timely Comics
- Marvel Mystery Comics (1939 series) #51 - Timely Comics
- Target Comics (1943 series) #9 - Novelty Press
- Terrific Comics (1944 series) #1 - Et-Es-Go Magazines
- U.S.A. Comics (1941 series) #11 - Timely Comics

=== February ===
- February 6: The first episode of Jacques Gagnier's La Vie en Images is published. It will run until 1944.
- February 10: The Italian comics magazine L'Audace is discontinued, after nearly ten years.
- Adventure Comics (Volume 1 1944) #90 - DC Comics
- Captain America Comics (1941 series) #35 - Timely Comics
- Gene Autry Comics (1941 series) #12 - Dell Comics, Final Issue
- Joker Comics (1942 series) #14 - Timely Comics
- Marvel Mystery Comics (1939 series) #52 - Timely Comics
- Suspense Comics (1943 series) #2 - Et-Es-Go Magazines
- Target Comics (1943 series) #10 - Novelty Press

=== March ===
- March 6: Debut of the long-running gag cartoon series This Funny World.
- Bomber Comics (March 1944) #1 . The issue marks the debut of Omar Tahan's Kismet, Man of Fate.
- Captain America Comics (1941 series) #36 - Timely Comics
- Cat-Man Comics (1941 series) #23 - Helnit Publishing
- Marvel Mystery Comics (1939 series) #53 - Timely Comics
- Target Comics (1943 series) #11 - Novelty Press
- Terrific Comics (1944 series) #2 - Et-Es-Go Magazines
- Young Allies Comics (1941 series) #11 - Timely Comics
- Young Allies Comics (1941 series) #12 - Timely Comics

=== April ===
- April: First publication of Jon St. Ables' Brok Windsor.
- All-Winners Comics (1941 series) #12 - Timely Comics
- Captain Aero Comics (1941 series) #14 - Helnit Publishing
- Captain America Comics (1941 series) #37 - Timely Comics
- Human Torch Comics (1940 series) #15 - Timely Comics
- Joker Comics (1942 series) #15 - Timely Comics
- Marvel Mystery Comics (1939 series) #54 - Timely Comics
- Sub-Mariner Comics (1941 series) #13 - Timely Comics
- Suspense Comics (1943 series) #3 - Et-Es-Go Magazines
- Target Comics (1943 series) #12 - Novelty Press
- U.S.A. Comics (1941 series) #12 - Timely Comics

=== May ===
- May 21: The first episode of André LeBlanc's Intellectual Amos is published.
- Captain America Comics (1941 series) #38 - Timely Comics
- Cat-Man Comics (1941 series) #24 - Helnit Publishing
- Marvel Mystery Comics (1939 series) #55 - Timely Comics
- Target Comics (1944 series) #1 - Novelty Press
- Terrific Comics (1944 series) #3 - Et-Es-Go Magazines

=== June ===
- June 5: Frank Robbins' newspaper comic strip Johnny Hazard makes its debut.
- June 25: The death of George Herriman signifies the discontinuation of Krazy Kat after nearly 31 years.
- June 26: Debut of Jim McMenamy's newspaper comic Dotty Dripple, which will run until October, after which it will be continued by Buford Tune.
- June 28: In Frank King's Gasoline Alley Skeezix marries Nina Clock.
- Captain Aero Comics (1941 series) #15 - Helnit Publishing
- Captain America Comics (1941 series) #39 - Timely Comics
- Joker Comics (1942 series) #16 - Timely Comics
- Marvel Mystery Comics (1939 series) #56 - Timely Comics
- Suspense Comics (1943 series) #4 - Et-Es-Go Magazines
- Target Comics (1944 series) #2 - Novelty Press
- Young Allies Comics (1941 series) #13 - Timely Comics
- Dan Gordon's Superkatt makes his debut in issue #9 of Giggle Comics.

=== July ===
- July 1: The first episode of Hilda Terry's Teena is published.
- Captain America Comics (1941 series) #40 - Timely Comics
- Cat-Man Comics (1941 series) #25 - Helnit Publishing
- Contact Comics #1 - Aviation Press
- Marvel Mystery Comics (1939 series) #57 - Timely Comics
- Mystery Comics #3 - In this issue Lance Lewis, Space Detective makes his debut.
- Terrific Comics (1944 series) #4 - Continental Magazines
- U.S.A. Comics (1941 series) #13 - Timely Comics

=== August ===
- August 5: In issue #272 of the British comics magazine The Dandy Jack Glass' The Amazing Mr. X makes his debut.
- August 13: Barbara Shermund publishes the first episode of her cartoon feature Shermund's Sallies, which will run in Pictorial Review until 2 June 1957.
- Captain Aero Comics (1941 series) #16 - Helnit Publishing
- Captain America Comics (1941 series) #41 - Timely Comics
- Green Mask (1940 series) #10 - Fox Feature Syndicate
- Suspense Comics (1943 series) #5 - Continental Magazines
- Target Comics (1944 series) #3 - Novelty Press

=== September ===
- September 10: In a Sunday table of Hubie Karp and Bill Wright, first apparition of Grandma Goofy.
- September 23: The entire editorial staff of Belgian newspaper Le Soir is arrested for Nazi collaboration. Hergé's Tintin story The Seven Crystal Balls, which ran in the paper, is discontinued and won't be resumed until 1946, albeit in the magazine Tintin. Hergé is jailed for a night, but freed again without any further charges. Nevertheless, he is unable to draw comics for about two years.
- September 30: In issue #30 of Superman recurring villain Mister Mxyzptlk makes his debut..
- All-Winners Comics (1941 series) #13 - Timely Comics
- Cat-Man Comics (1941 series) #26 - Helnit Publishing
- Marvel Mystery Comics (1939 series) #58 - Timely Comics
- Sub-Mariner Comics (1941 series) #14 - Timely Comics
- Terrific Comics (1944 series) #5 - Continental Magazines

=== October ===
- October 1: In Carl Barks' Donald Duck story Tight-Wire Walkers the city of Duckburg is first mentioned.
- October 5: The liberation of Belgium a year earlier lifts the Nazi ban on the Belgian comics magazine Spirou from a year earlier. The magazine now reappears in stores. Its main series Spirou et Fantasio is naturally continued and Spirou's sidekick Fantasio (a creation of Jijé) is now firmly established as a main cast member.
- October 16: Buford Tune takes over Jim McMenamy's family comic Dotty Dripple and will continue it for the next forty years.
- The Belgian comics magazine Bimbo also returns to the market, after being banned by the Nazis in 1943.
- Captain Aero Comics (1941 series) #17 - Helnit Publishing
- Captain America Comics (1941 series) #42 - Timely Comics
- Daring Comics (1940 series) #9 - Timely Comics (Daring Mystery Comics was renamed to Daring Comics)
- Human Torch Comics (1940 series) #16 - Timely Comics
- Marvel Mystery Comics (1939 series) #59 - Timely Comics
- Miss America Comics #1 - Timely Comics
- Suspense Comics (1943 series) #6 - Continental Magazines
- Target Comics (1944 series) #4 - Novelty Press
- U.S.A. Comics (1941 series) #14 - Timely Comics
- The first issue of the Belgian comics magazine Franc Jeu is published.

=== November ===
- November 16:
  - The first issue of the Argentine comics magazine Rico Tipo is published.
  - Russian-Serbian comics artist Ivan Šenšin is executed at age 47 by a Communist firing squad on the incorrect suspicion of being a Nazi collaborator.
- November 18: Bulgarian cartoonist Rayko Aleksiev dies at age 51, after being brutally interrogated by officers of the newly established Communist regime.
- November 20: Marten Toonder cancels Tom Poes halfway a story in the newspaper De Telegraaf, after being informed that the new chief editor will be a member of the Dutch SS. He even asks a doctor to declare him "too manic depressive to continue working." The series will not be continued until 10 March 1947.
- All-Winners Comics (1941 series) #14 - Timely Comics
- Cat-Man Comics (1941 series) #26a - Helnit Publishing
- Green Mask (1940 series) #11 - Fox Feature Syndicate
- Human Torch Comics (1940 series) #17 - Timely Comics
- Sub-Mariner Comics (1941 series) #15 - Timely Comics
- Target Comics (1944 series) #5 - Novelty Press
- Terrific Comics (1944 series) #6 - Continental Magazines, Final Issue

=== December ===
- December 24: Marc Sleen publishes his first adventure comic De Avonturen van Neus and a gag comic named Piet Fluwijn. The latter will prove to be more durable when a year later the new character Bolleke is introduced and the series will be renamed Piet Fluwijn en Bolleke.
- December 30: Marjorie Henderson Buell's newspaper comic Little Lulu comes to a close.
- Captain Aero Comics (1941 series) #21 - Helnit Publishing, there are no issues numbered 18-20.
- Captain America Comics (1941 series) #43 - Timely Comics
- Marvel Mystery Comics (1939 series) #60 - Timely Comics
- Suspense Comics (1943 series) #7 - Continental Magazines
- Target Comics (1944 series) #6 - Novelty Press
- Young Allies Comics (1941 series) #14 - Timely Comics

=== Winter ===
- Blackhawk #9, taking over the numbering of Uncle Sam Quarterly — first issue of Blackhawk's own title (Quality Comics)
- Joker Comics (1942 series) #17 - Timely Comics
- Wonder Woman, volume 1, issue #11 (DC Comics). This also marks the debut of recurring villain Hypnota.

== Births ==
=== January ===
- January 6: Claude Lacroix, a.k.a. Tartemption, Alias, French comics artist and illustrator (Farfelune, Yann Le Migrateur, Fariboles Sidérales, Cyann), (d. 2021).
- January 24: Robin Wood, Paraguayan-Argentine comics writer (Nippur de Lagash, Dago, Gilgamesh el inmortal,...), (d. 2021).

== Deaths ==
=== January ===
- January 2: Orville Peter Williams, A.K.A. O.P. Williams, American comic artist (Gasoline Gus), dies at age 67.
- January 9: Döes, Swiss illustrator and comics artist, dies at age 84 or 85.
- January 20: Arthur LeMay, Canadian caricaturist, illustrator and comics artist (continued Les Aventures de Timothée), dies at age 43 or 44.
- Specific date unknown: Bernie Klein, American comics artist (worked for DC Comics, Quality Comics, Lev Gleason), dies in battle at age 23.

=== February ===
- February 4: Will B. Johnstone, American lyricist, screenwriter and comics artist (You Know Me Al), dies at age 62.
- February 27: Henri Cassiers, Belgian illustrator, poster artist and comics artist, dies at age 85.

=== March ===
- March 30: Lucien Laurent-Gsell, French painter, comics artist and illustrator, dies at age 83.

=== April ===
- April 6: Rose O'Neill, American comics artist, illustrator and novelist (Kewpies), dies at age 69 from paralysis and heart failure.
- April 25: George Herriman, American comics artist (Krazy Kat), dies at age 63.

=== June ===
- June 6: John Hix, American comic writer and artist (Strange as It Seems), dies at age 36.

=== September ===
- September 2: Jan Feith, Dutch illustrator and comics artist (De Geschiedenis des Vaderlands), dies at age 80.
- September 13: William Heath Robinson, British cartoonist, dies at age 72

=== October ===
- October 10: Antoni Utrillo, Spanish illustrator, writer, lithographer, painter, comics artist and poster designer (La Rondalla del Dijous), dies at age 76 or 77.
- October 15: Melitón González, Spanish illustrator and comics artist, dies at age 89.
- October 21: Nell Brinkley, American illustrator and comics artist (Brinkley Girls), dies at age 68.
- October 23: Gerrit Rotman, Dutch teacher and comics artist (Snuffelgraag en Knagelijntje, Meneer Pimpelmans), dies at age 51.
- Specific date unknown: Robert L. Dickey, American painter and comics artist (Mr. and Mrs. Beans, Buster Beans, Buckey and his Pals), dies at age 82 or 83.

=== November ===
- November 16: Ivan Šenšin, Russian-Serbian comics artist (illegal Mickey Mouse comics, furthermore made comic strip adaptations of novels), is executed at age 47.
- November 18: Rayko Aleksiev, Bulgarian caricaturist, cartoonist, illustrator and comics artist, dies at age 51, after beaten up during interrogations.
- Specific date in November unknown: Veljko Kockar, Croatian comic artist (Kaktus Bata), dies at age 24.

=== December ===
- December 22: Louis Briault, British comics artist (The Comical Capers of Billie Reeves, the Scream of the Screen, The Psychic Trip), dies at age 59.

=== Specific date unknown ===
- Vlastimir Belkic, Yugoslavian comics artist (Hari Vilsa, illegal Mickey Mouse comics), dies at age 47 or 48.
- Paul Fung, American comics artist (Innocent Hing, A Guy from Grand Rapids, Big House Fables, Gus and Gussie, continued Dumb Dora), dies at age 56 or 57.
- Henry Thol, American comics artist (Adamson's Adventures), dies at age 57 or 58.

== First issues by title ==
- Miss America Comics (October) - Timely Comics
- Terrific Comics (January) - Et-Es-Go Magazines

== Initial appearances by character name ==
- Gambler in Green Lantern #12 (June), created by Henry Kuttner and Martin Nodell - DC Comics
- Giganta in Wonder Woman #9 (June), created by William Moulton Marston - DC Comics
- Green Mask (Johnny Green) in Green Mask #10 (August) - Fox Feature Syndicate
- Mister Mxyzptlk in Superman #30 (September) created by Jerry Siegel and Joe Shuster - DC Comics
- Psycho-Pirate in All-Star Comics #23 (December), created by Gardner Fox and Joe Gallagher - DC Comics
- Professor Carter Nichols in Batman #24 (August), created by Joe Samachson and Dick Sprang - DC Comics
- Queen Clea in Wonder Woman #8 (March), created by William Moulton Marston - DC Comics
- Solomon Grundy in All-American Comics #61 (October), created by Alfred Bester and Paul Reinman - DC Comics
