= Nina Albright =

American comic book artist (1907–1997)

- Born: Nina Dorothy Albright; February 15, 1907 Manhattan, New York, U.S.
- Died: February 7, 1997 (aged 89) New York City, U.S.
- Area: Artist
- Notable works: Miss Victory

Nina Dorothy Albright (February 15, 1907 – February 7, 1997) was an American comic book artist for nine years during the Golden Age of Comic Books. She was one of the few women illustrating and writing comic books during the period.

== Early life ==
Arthur Gustave Abrecht (Father), Mary Stuart (mother) and Nina moved to Brooklyn in 1902 from Manhattan while Arthur worked as a reporter for a German newspaper New Yorker Staats-Zeitung. She decided to become an artist after receiving an honorable mention for her submissions to drawing contests in children's magazine St. Nicholas Magazine in 1922. In addition, at 16 she received both first prizes and the "Gold Badge" in 1923. After Nina Albright graduated a catholic high school, in June 1924. During that same year in September, she enrolled in the School of Art at the Pratt Institute in Brooklyn.

== Early career ==
After graduating college in 1927, she continued to live with her parents while she worked as a freelance artist. In the 1930’s she joined a company as a director of entertainment, she was also advertising her skills as a portrait and landscape artist on several cruise tours of the West Indies. in the 1940's Albright got her start in the comics industry by answering a classified ad placed by packager Jerry Iger. She worked in studios like Majestic Studios, Funnies Inc., L.B. Cole, and Bernard Baily in the 1940s. While employed at Novelty Press in New York, she worked on such features as Young King Cole, Lem the Grem, Contact Comics, Dr. Doom, Bull's Eye Bill, and The Cadet (mostly backup features in the Novelty titles 4 Most and Target Comics). She also worked on Fiction House features, including Captain Terry Thunder, Hooks Devlin, Inspector Dayton and Senorita Rio.

== World War II and Miss Victory ==
In 1940, Albright was hired alongside several other female comic book artists by Fiction House, a pulp publishing company. Albright and her contemporaries, including Lily Renée and Fran Hopper, were hired to replace male artists who had been drafted.

In 1945, Albright and an unknown writer created Comandette, a heroine featured in Star Studded Comics #1, published by Cambridge House Publishers. At Holyoke Publications, she worked on Miss Victory. She also worked for Aviation Press on their Black Venus, and illustrated romance stories for Timely, such as Junior Miss. In 1947, Albright illustrated The Cadet for Target Comics. Although the comic featured a male protagonist, it notably included several complex female characters.

Albright worked for Archie Publications, St. John Publications, and Ziff-Davis. Albright worked in comics for a total of nine years.

== Later career ==
In the 1950s, Albright turned to illustrating, and worked for magazines such as American Girl Magazine and the Polly French book series written by Francine Lewis and published by the Whitman Publishing Company. She contributed illustrations to a number of educational text books, including Joyce Jackson's Guide To Dating, Manual for Second Year Readers, and This Is Chicago. In the 1960s she contributed book covers for the Signal Books Publishing Company, for example Bonnie by Lee Wyndham published in 1961.
