= The Adventures of Dick Cole =

Comic book series

Dick Cole
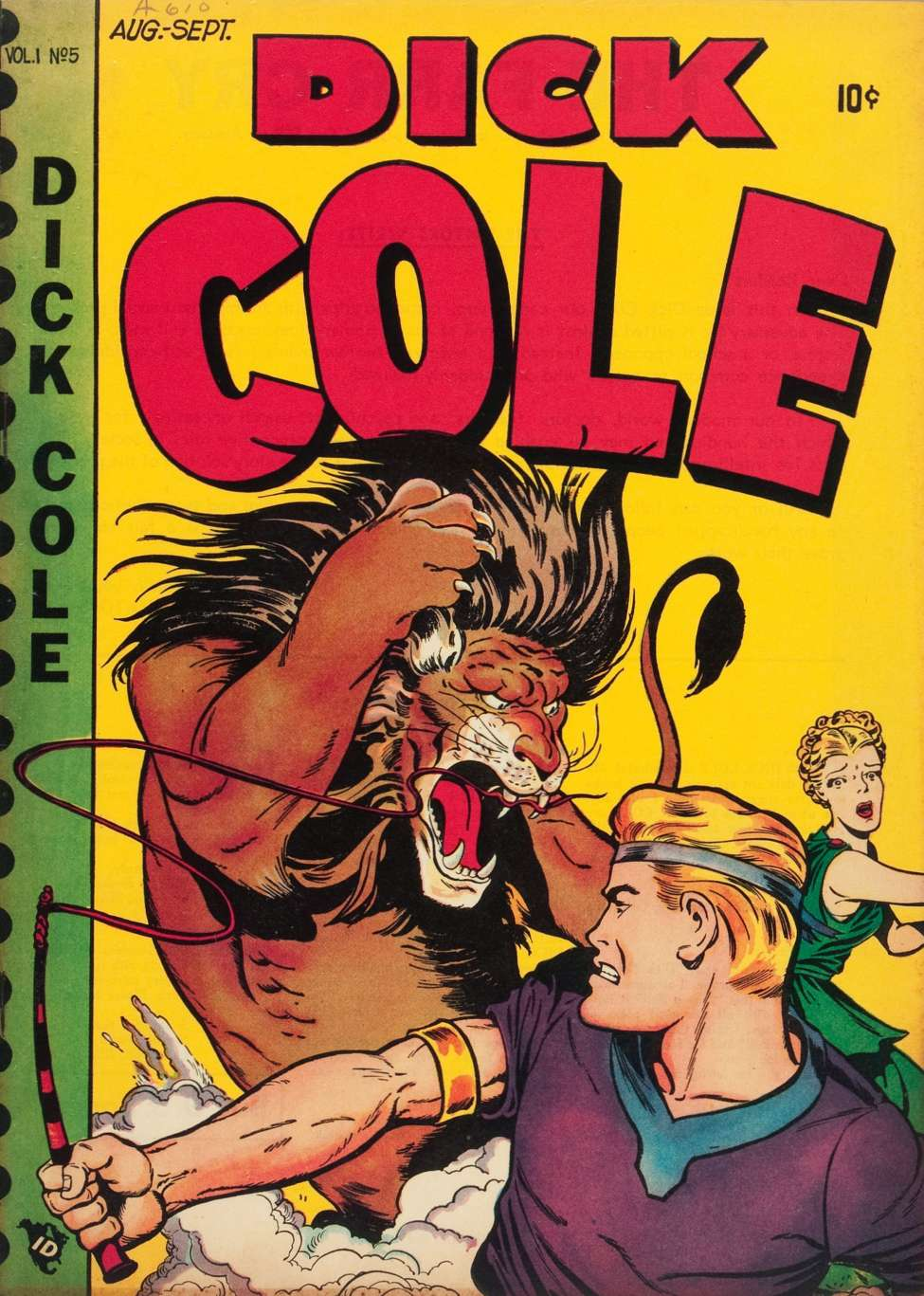
- Joe Certa's cover illustration for Dick Cole #5 (Novelty Press, Aug./Sept. 1949)

Publication information
- Publisher: Novelty Press; Star Publications
- First appearance: Blue Bolt Comics #1 (June 1940)
- Created by: Bob Davis
Dick Cole
Publication information
- Schedule: Monthly
- Format: Ongoing series
- Genre: Adventure
- Publication date: Dec./Jan. (1949) 1948 – June/July 1950
- No. of issues: 10
Creative team
- Artist(s): Bob Davis, Al McWilliams, Joe Certa, Jim Wilcox, Al Fagaly, Jack Hearne
- Editor: L. B. Cole

The Adventures of Dick Cole was a 1940s comic book series, created by Bob Davis. It was published by Novelty Press, and later, Star Publications. Dick Cole is a heroic cadet at the fictional Farr Military Academy. The character was introduced in the "Origin of Dick Cole," in the first issue of Novelty Press' Blue Bolt Comics (cover-dated June 1940).

== Publication history ==
Billed as "America's Number One School Star", Dick Cole starred in a backup feature in Novelty Press' Blue Bolt (and later 4 Most), with regular stories about the young hero appearing until 1949. The character got his own book with five issues of Dick Cole (Novelty Press/Star Publications, 1948–1949), illustrated by L. B. Cole, Joe Certa, Jim Wilcox, Al Fagaly, Jack Hearne, and others. L. B. Cole continued the title for five more issues at Star Publications in 1949–1950. (Many of the stories published in the Star issues were reprints from Blue Bolt and another Novelty Press title, Target Comics.)

== Fictional character biography ==
Dick was an orphan left at the Farr Military Academy, and taken in by Professor Blair, who wants to bring him up to be a physical marvel. After years of training, Dick becomes super-strong and acrobatic. He uses these skills to fight crime.

== Radio ==
In 1942, the Dick Cole feature was adapted into a 30-minute syndicated juvenile adventure radio program that followed the adventures of Dick (Leon Janney) at the Farr Military Academy. When Cole wasn't winning football games, he tracked evildoers with an assist from his Academy pals Simba and Ted. The announcer was Paul Luther. Lew White provided the background music. The program was transcribed and syndicated by the World Broadcasting System.

Radio Daily's 1946 publication, Shows of Tomorrow, listed the transcribed series Adventures of Dick Cole at Farr Military Academy as being available for the 1946-1947 radio season. The series, produced by Charles Michelson Inc., consisted of 52 half-hour episodes.
