= Fred Schwab =

American cartoonist

- Born: August 25, 1917 New York City, U.S.
- Died: May 13, 2000 (aged 82) New York City, U.S.
- Areas: Penciler, Inker, Cartoonist
- Notable works: Marvel Comics #1 (Oct. 1939) "Lady Luck"

Fred Schwab (August 25, 1917 – May 13, 2000) was an American cartoonist whose humor panels and short features were published in a wide variety of comic books from at least 1938 to 1950, during a period fans and historians call the Golden Age of Comic Books. His notable comic-book appearances include Timely Comics' Marvel Comics #1 (Oct. 1939), the first publication of the company that would become Marvel Comics; and some of the earliest publications of the companies that would become DC Comics.

== Biography ==
Fred Schwab was born in New York City and educated there at the Art Students League; his influences included cartoonists Billy DeBeck and Milt Gross. Schwab broke into the nascent field of comic books as a teenager in 1936, at Manhattan's Harry "A" Chesler studio, the first of the comic book "packagers" that supplied complete comics to publishers testing the waters of the emerging medium. In 1939, Schwab began freelancing for two other packagers: the Eisner-Iger studio, and Funnies, Inc. He signed his work both with his own name and a variety of pseudonyms that included Boris Plaster, Fred Wood, Fist E. Cuffs, Stockton Fred, Fred Ricks, Fred West, and Fred Watt. For this reason, and because creator credits were not routinely given during the early days of comic books, a comprehensive list of his credits is difficult if not impossible to compile.

Whether for a packager or on his own, Schwab supplied gag cartoons in 1938 and 1939 to the glossy magazine Boys' Life, and in the early 1940s to the military magazine Yank. Schwab's first known comic-book credit is as writer and artist of the two-page "Tenderfoot Joe" Western-humor feature in Centaur Comics' Star Ranger #1 (Feb. 1937). Other early work includes the one-page "Silly Sleuths" in Detective Comics #1-2, 5 and 7 (March–April, July, Sept. 1937), from Detective Comics Inc., one of the predecessors of DC Comics; the two-page "The Great Boodini" in Centaur's Funny Pages vol. 2, #3 (Nov. 1937); the one-page "Butch the Pup" in More Fun Comics #33-35 (July-Sept. 1938), from DC predecessors National Allied Publications/National Comics; a Sherlock Holmes parody feature for Fox Comics' Mystery Men Comics #1-2 (Aug.-Sept. 1939); and much more in issues of National's Adventure Comics, Action Comics, and others.

For Funnies, Inc., in 1939, either Schwab or Martin Filchock drew the cover of Motion Picture Funnies Weekly #1 (sources differ), an unpublished series designed to be a promotional giveaway in movie theaters. That comic is best known for the first appearance of the superhero the Sub-Mariner, created by fellow Funnies, Inc. freelancer Bill Everett. When Funnies, Inc. then supplied the contents of Marvel Comics #1 (Oct. 1939), the first comic book published by Marvel Comics predecessor Timely Comics, the packager included both an expanded version of the Sub-Mariner story plus five one-panel gags by Schwab that appear on the inside front cover under the rubric "Now I'll Tell One".

Schwab also supplied humor pieces and features in the 1940s for Columbia Comics' Big Shot Comics; Fiction House's Fight Comics; Four Star Publications' Captain Flight Comics; Fox's Fantastic Comics; Novelty Press' Target Comics; and Timely's Daring Mystery Comics, in addition to much work for National. He served in World War II as a photojournalist.

In 1948, Schwab drew in a more adventure-oriented vein when he began ghosting for Klaus Nordling on the lighthearted adventure feature "Lady Luck", which originated in Will Eisner's syndicated Sunday-newspaper comic-book insert, The Spirit Section. Schwab, under Nordling's byline, drew a number of Lady Luck stories later reprinted in Quality Comics' Smash Comics #79 (Oct. 1948) and in the last four of the publisher's five issues of Lady Luck, which took over Smash Comics' numbering from issues #86-90 (Dec. 1949 - Aug. 1950).

From 1947 until his retirement in 1979, he worked in the art department of The New York Times, as a graphic designer.

== Personal life ==
Schwab married Barbara Frick, who predeceased him. He lived at 411 East 53rd Street in Manhattan at the time of his death.

== Reprints ==
Schwab's work has been reprinted in publisher Ken Pierce's two-issue Lady Luck (1980); DC's Millennium Edition: Detective Comics 1 (2001); and Marvel Comics #1: 70th Anniversary Edition (2009). A handful of his humor pieces appear in DC's first three volumes of Superman Archives reprints of Golden Age Superman comics (1989–1991).
