= Lloyd Jacquet =

Founder of Funnies, Inc., one of the first comic book "packagers"

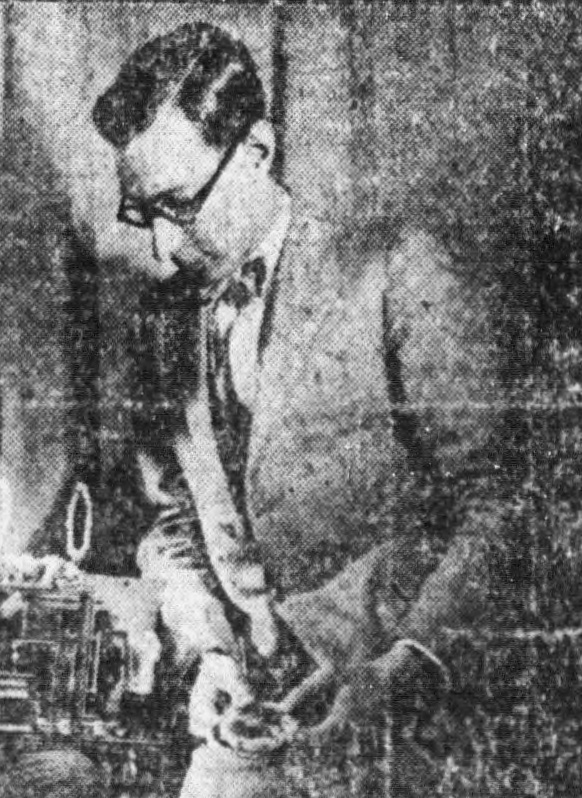
- in 1925
- Born: Lloyd Victor Jaquet; March 7, 1899 Brooklyn, New York, U.S.
- Died: March 1970 (aged c. 71) New York State, U.S.
- Areas: Editor, Publisher
- Notable works: Funnies, Inc.

Lloyd Victor Jacquet (/ˈdʒækɪt/; March 7, 1899 – March 1970) was the founder of Funnies, Inc., one of the first and most prominent of a handful of comic book "packagers" established in the late 1930s that created comics on demand for publishers testing the waters of the emerging medium. Among its other achievements, Funnies, Inc. supplied the contents of Marvel Comics #1, the first publication of the company that would evolve into Marvel Comics. Characters created by Jacquet's company include the Sub-Mariner and the original Golden Age Human Torch.

== Biography ==
=== Early life and career ===
Lloyd Jacquet was born in Brooklyn to a father who had emigrated from France. After serving as a colonel in World War I, Jacquet worked as an editor for Major Malcolm Wheeler-Nicholson's National Allied Magazines (the future DC Comics) on some of the first comic books — including the landmark New Fun: The Big Comic Magazine (Feb. 1935), the first such publication with solely original material rather than any newspaper comic strip reprints. Jacquet remained through its first four issues, later becoming art director of the George Matthew Adams Service in c. 1936–1937, and then art director of Centaur Publications — where some sources credit him with co-creating writer-artist Bill Everett's superhero Amazing Man — before leaving to start Funnies, Inc.

The company was founded as First Funnies, Inc. in an attempt to publish a promotional giveaway comic, Motion Picture Funnies Weekly, but that idea proved unsuccessful.

Novelist Mickey Spillane, who began his career in comics and worked at Funnies, Inc., recalled in 2006 that, "Our boss, Lloyd Jacquet, a dead ringer for Douglas MacArthur (corncob pipe and all), was a wonderful man, but could never understand living among wildcat writers and artists. All of us were pretty much freelance people, so firing us would have been a useless gesture".

As Captain America co-creator Joe Simon further described, "Jacquet's office was painted battleship gray. The furnishing were sparse, his desk ancient but scrubbed and neat. His black, high-topped shoes, polished to a high sheen, reflected a military presence as he sat upright in a straight-back chair...."

=== Later life and career ===
After Funnies, Inc. ended, Lloyd Jacquet Studios continued to package comics through at least 1949, when Jacquet hired artist Joe Orlando to do work for Treasure Chest, the Catholic-oriented comic book distributed in parochial schools. Other Lloyd Jacquet Studios projects included Your United States, an educational, giveaway comic produced for publisher Fred W. Danner in 1946, with art by Sid Greene and Tex Blaisdell.

Jacquet was living in the borough of Queens, New York when he died in March 1970 at c. age 71. His wife was named Grace.
