= Blue Bolt =

Comic book superhero created in 1940

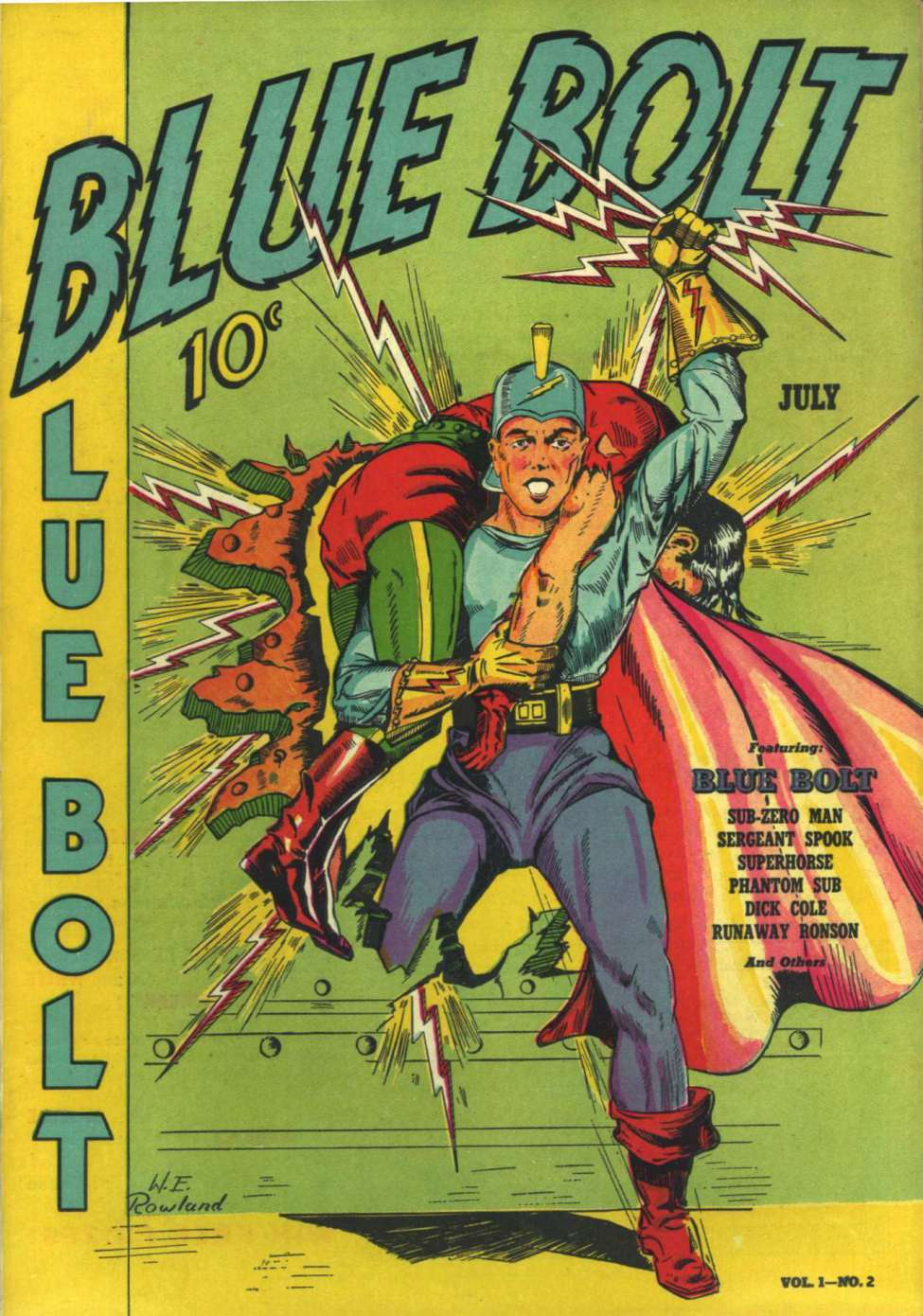
- Blue Bolt Comics #2 (July 1940), cover art by W. E. Rowland.

Publication information
- Publisher: Novelty Press
- First appearance: Blue Bolt Comics #1 (June 1940)
- Created by: Joe Simon

In-story information
- Alter ego: Fred Parrish
- Abilities: Lightning bolt projection Use of a "lightning gun"

Blue Bolt is a fictional American comic book superhero created by writer-artist Joe Simon in 1940, during the period fans and historians refer to as the Golden Age of Comic Books.

== Publication history ==
Initially published by Novelty Press, Blue Bolt Comics, one of the earliest comic books titled after a single character, ran 101 issues, cover-dated June 1940 to August 1951. Its namesake hero was created by writer-artist Joe Simon for Funnies Inc., one of the earliest comic-book "packagers" that produced outsourced comics on demand for publishers entering the fledgling medium. By the second issue, Simon had enlisted Jack Kirby as the series co-writer/artist, starting the first pairing of the future comic book legends who shortly thereafter created Captain America and other characters. As Simon recalled in a 1998 Comic-Con International panel in San Diego, California:

I was doing freelance work and I had a little office in New York about ten blocks from DC [Comics]' and Fox [Feature Syndicate]'s offices, and I was working on Blue Bolt for Funnies Inc. So, of course, I loved Jack's work and the first time I saw it I couldn't believe what I was seeing. He asked if we could do some freelance work together. I was delighted and I took him over to my little office. We worked from the second issue of Blue Bolt...

The two teamed until issue #10, turning over the book to successors including Dan Barry, Tom Gill, and Mickey Spillane (before Spillane's creation of the detective character Mike Hammer in novels).

Other enduring features in Blue Bolt included Dick Cole, The Wonder Boy, Sub-Zero Man, Sgt. Spook, Old Cap Hawkin's Tales, White Rider and Super Horse, Edison Bell, Runaway Ronson, Phantom Sub, Krisko and Jasper, Fearless Fellers, and Rick Richards.

As the popularity of superheroes began to fade in the post-World War II era, the character of Blue Bolt was transformed from a superhero into a plainclothes type of hero.

In 1949, Novelty Press sold its assets, including Blue Bolt, to series cover artist L. B. Cole due to the growing criticism over violence in comic books. Using his new assets, Cole began his own company, Star Publications.

=== Transition to horror title ===
By 1951, Blue Bolt Comics' name had been changed to Blue Bolt Weird Tales of Terror and featured the type of horror covers epitomized by EC Comics. A couple of issues after the name change, the Blue Bolt was dropped in favor of horror stories. With issue #120 (published in 1953) the title was changed to Ghostly Weird Stories, which published four more issues under that title before folding after issue #124 (September 1954).

=== Later usage of the Blue Bolt name ===
Hero Comics (now known as Heroic Publishing) launched a superhero series called Captain Thunder and Blue Bolt by writers Roy and Dann Thomas in 1987, by which time Star Publications' trademark had long since expired. Roy Thomas has acknowledged that he took the name Blue Bolt from the Joe Simon character, and that in their later conversations Joe Simon was upset over this, even half-jokingly saying that he would take the Thomases to court over the use of the name. The series was cancelled in 1988 after ten issues, though two further issues were published in 1992.

In 2025 Marvel Comics began using a character named Blue Bolt in West Coast Avengers. Joe Simon's grandson alerted Roy Thomas about this, and since Thomas had already been advertising the upcoming publication of a volume reprinting the entire Captain Thunder and Blue Bolt series, he contacted Marvel Comics to negotiate the potential trademark conflict. Marvel Comics agreed to change their character's name, though due to lead times several issues would appear with the character being called Blue Bolt.

== Fictional character biography ==
The college football star Fred Parrish is struck by lightning during practice, and then boards a plane in order to seek help. This plane is struck by a second lightning bolt, causing the plane to crash. Finding himself underground, Parrish is found by a scientist named Bertoff who heals him using an experimental radium treatment. This treatment gives Parrish super powers. Using his powers and a lightning gun given to him by Bertoff, Parrish takes up the name the Blue Bolt and battles the underground forces of his arch-enemy, the evil Green Sorceress.

After a year, the Blue Bolt discovers that World War II has started. He journeys back to the surface to fight against the Nazis.

After the war, Blue Bolt becomes a pilot for Glimpses, the picture magazine, and works with daring photographer Snap Doodle.

== Powers and abilities ==
After being struck by lightning twice and being healed via an experimental treatment, Fred Parrish gained the ability to project lightning bolts. He also possessed a lightning gun which could shoot lightning bolts.
