= Funnies Inc. =

American comic book packager of the late 1930s-1940s

- Funnies, Inc. supplied the contents of Marvel Comics #1 (cover-dated Oct. 1939), the first publication of Marvel predecessor Timely Comics
- Founded: Late 1930s
- Founder: Lloyd Jacquet
- Defunct: 1949
- Headquarters location: 45 West 45th Street, New York City
- Key people: Carl Burgos, Bill Everett, Mickey Spillane, Leonard Starr
- Publication types: Comic books

Funnies, Inc. was an American comic book packager of the late 1930s to 1940s period collectors and historians call the Golden Age of Comic Books. Founded by Lloyd Jacquet, it supplied the contents of early comics, including that of Marvel Comics #1 (cover-dated Oct. 1939), the first publication of what would become the multimedia corporation Marvel Comics.

== Company history ==
=== Founding ===
American comic books originated as oversized magazines that reprinted newspaper comic strips in color. These strips, coming from "the funny pages", were colloquially called "the funnies". Gradually, new material began to be created for the emerging medium of comic books. In the late 1930s, with the huge sales success of Superman, many magazine publishers and entrepreneurs jumped on the trend.

One of the many comics companies founded during this time was Centaur Publications, where Lloyd Jacquet was art director and where comic creators included writer and artist Bill Everett. Jacquet then broke off to form Funnies, Inc., initially called First Funnies, Inc. Located at 45 West 45th Street in Manhattan, New York City, it was one of that era's "comic book packagers" that would create comics on demand for publishers. Its competitors included two other comics packagers formed around this time: Eisner & Iger, founded by Will Eisner and Jerry Iger, and the quirkily named Harry "A" Chesler's studio.

Everett recalled in the late 1960s that,

When Lloyd split with [Centaur partner] John [Harley], he offered me and a fellow by the name of Max Neill a chance to go in with him and two other guys, John Mahon and Frank Torpey ... We took a small loft office on 45th Street. The idea was to become publishers. But we didn't have the money or credit to publish our own books so we became an art service. We'd put the whole book together, deliver the package to the publisher and get paid for it.

Torpey was Centaur's sales director, and Mahon a publisher for one of Centaur's early iterations. Other Centaur staffers who followed Jacquet, on at least a freelance basis, included artists Carl Burgos, Paul Gustavson, and Ben Thompson; writer Ray Gill; and business manager Jim Fitzsimmons. Others who worked for Funnies, Inc. included future novelist Mickey Spillane; Leonard Starr, future creator of the comic strip On Stage; and artist Bob Davis, who for Funnies, Inc. created the boy hero Dick Cole in Novelty Press' Blue Bolt Comics.

As Everett described, "Lloyd ... had an idea that he wanted to start his own art service — to start a small organization to supply artwork and editorial material to publishers. ... He asked me to join him. He also asked Carl Burgos. So we were the nucleus ..." I don't know how to explain it, but I was still on a freelance basis. That was the agreement we had. The artists, including myself, at Funnies, worked on a freelance basis." Comics historian Hames Ware added that,

Planned premiere issue of Motion Picture Funnies Weekly. Cover art, possibly colorized in this scan, generally attributed to Fred Schwab.

The Jacquet shop was distinct from the other major shops. It was set up more like a clearinghouse that a conventional shop. While at the other classic shops there were actually buildings and offices housing ... many artists who often collaborated on jobs, most of Jacquet's artists worked from home and did solo work and, also unlike other shops, got credit for whatever job they did. (Jacquet also allowed writer credits from time to time).

Funnies, Inc.'s first known project was Motion Picture Funnies Weekly, a promotional comic planned for giveaway in movie theaters. The idea proved unsuccessful, and seven of the only eight known samples created to send to theater owners were discovered in an estate sale in 1974. Additionally, proof sheets were found there for the covers of issues #2–4. The "Comic Books on Microfiche" collection of the University of Tulsa's McFarlin Library lists Centaur Publications' Amazing Man Comics #5 (Sept. 1939), the premiere issue, as continuing the numbering of Motion Picture Funnies Weekly, but this is unconfirmed.

=== The first Marvel comic ===
Funnies, Inc.'s first actual sale was to pulp magazine publisher Martin Goodman. As Everett recalled, Funnies, Inc., sales manager Frank Torpey "had a friend, Martin Goodman, who was in the publishing business, and Frank talked Martin into going into publishing comics ..." For what would be called Marvel Comics #1 (Oct. 1939), Funnies, Inc. created a set of features that included two nascent star characters: Burgos' original Human Torch and Everett's Sub-Mariner, expanding an origin story Everett had created for the never-released Motion Picture Funnies Weekly #1. Among the other characters introduced was Gustavson's the Angel, a modest hit who would appear in more than 100 Golden Age stories. Goodman, whose business strategy involved having a multitude of corporate entities, eventually used Timely Comics as the umbrella name for his comic-book division.

Other early companies that bought material from Funnies, Inc. include Centaur, Fox Feature Syndicate, and Hillman Periodicals. For the Novelty Press division of the Premium Service Company, writer-artist Joe Simon created Blue Bolt and Basil Wolverton devised Spacehawk.

Simon said that his Funnies, Inc. rate for a completed comic-book page — written, drawn and lettered — was $7. For comparison, he recalled that at Eisner-Iger — where Eisner wrote the features and created characters, hiring novice artists — the page rate was approximately $3.50 to $5.50; publishers were charged $5 to $7 per finished page.

Funnies, Inc. was eventually made obsolete by the growing medium's success, allowing publishers to hire their own staffs. As Simon recalled, he stopped freelancing for the company when he became Timely Comics' editor: "Soon, we were buying only 'The Human Torch' and 'Sub-Mariner' from Jacquet and irritating the hell out of him with demands for script and art changes in the hopes that he would resign the features he had helped to build".

Toward the end of 1940, Jacquet sold Goodman the rights to the characters. Business relations evidently remained cordial; in an Aug. 14, 1942, photo given to attendees and widely published by the comics press in the 2000s, Jacquet was seated next to Goodman at a Hotel Astor luncheon Goodman hosted for the Timely and Funnies staffs, followed by a showing of the new Disney movie Bambi. Others at the table included Torpey, Gill, Timely editor Stan Lee, and such artists/writers as Vince Alascia, Ernie Hart, Jack Keller, George Klein, Jim Mooney, Don Rico, Mike Sekowsky, and Syd Shores.

=== Demise ===
After Funnies, Inc. ended, Lloyd Jacquet Studios continued to package comics through at least 1949.
