= Motion Picture Funnies Weekly =

1939 American comic book

- Planned premiere issue (1939); Cover art by Fred Schwab

Publication information
- Publisher: First Funnies, Inc.
- Format: Anthology
- Publication date: 1939
- No. of issues: 1 (unpublished)
- Main character(s): Sub-Mariner, American Ace

Creative team
- Written by: Bill Everett; Paul J. Lauretta
- Artist(s): Bill Everett; Paul J. Lauretta

Motion Picture Funnies Weekly is a 36-page American comic book created in 1939, and designed to be a promotional giveaway in movie theaters. While the idea proved unsuccessful, and only a handful of sample copies of issue #1 were printed, the periodical is historically important for introducing the enduring Marvel Comics character Namor the Sub-Mariner, created by writer-artist Bill Everett.

== Production history ==
Motion Picture Funnies Weekly was produced by First Funnies, Inc., one of the 1930s–1940s Golden Age of comic books "packagers" that would create outsourced comics on demand for publishers. The company, founded by Centaur Publications art director Lloyd Jacquet and later named Funnies Inc., planned to be a publisher itself, with Motion Picture Funnies Weekly as its initial product. While the postal indicia gives the publisher as First Funnies, Inc., the back cover, a house ad, directs interested parties to contact Funnies, Inc.

The comic, with black-and-white pages and a color cover and designed to be distributed to children in movie theaters, was never published, although samples were printed to show theater-owners. Either eight or nine samples exist (sources differ). All but one were discovered at the late Jacquet's estate sale in 1974. One sample, dubbed the "Pay Copy", contains written payment information for the various creators who contributed to the comic. Additionally, proof sheets were found there for the covers of issues #2–4.

The discovery of the hitherto forgotten Motion Picture Funnies Weekly rewrote an early part of the history of comics, and caused a sensation at the time. Marvel Comics, in 1978, describing the creation of its superhero the Sub-Mariner, wrote:

Sub-Mariner's first story, eight pages long, was written, penciled, inked and lettered by the late William Blake "Bill" Everett, for publication in the pilot issue of a small giveaway comic book titled Motion Picture Funnies Weekly. This comic was the first item produced by the Lloyd V. Jacquet art shop, Funnies, Inc. (then called First Funnies, Inc.); the Sub-Mariner story was dated April 1939. It was the idea of those who operated Funnies, Inc. to distribute Motion Picture Funnies Weekly through movie theaters to attract customers. Apparently the theater owners thought little of the venture and the project was unsuccessful.

The "Comic Books on Microfiche" collection of the University of Tulsa's McFarlin Library lists Centaur Publications' Amazing Man Comics #5 (Sept. 1939), the premiere issue, as continuing the numbering of Motion Picture Funnies Weekly, but this is unconfirmed.

No copy was filed with the Library of Congress.

== Contents ==
The back cover.

The first issue included Bill Everett's original eight-page Sub-Mariner origin story, which was expanded by four pages when it eventually saw print in Marvel Comics #1 (Oct. 1939) – the first publication of Marvel Comics' Golden Age predecessor, Timely Comics, the contents for which were supplied by Funnies, Inc. The final panel on page 8 contained a box reading "Continued Next Week", as well as a notation indicating an April 1939 date for the art. The box remained, sans words and colored in, when reprinted as part of the 12-page story in Marvel Comics #1 (Oct. 1939), and reprinted as the original eight-page story in Marvel's The Invaders #20 (Sept. 1977). As historian Les Daniels writes,

Early in 1939 a bizarre character called The Sub-Mariner ... had been featured in the black-and-white Motion Picture Funnies Weekly, a failed promotional giveaway that Funnies, Inc. had produced. The creator of that story was a struggling young artist from Massachusetts named Bill Everett. ... [The character] became the first Marvel hero: he was created by Everett before any other comic book character published by the [Martin] Goodman group. Everett and his fish-man might have been dead in the water, but happily for all concerned, the story from the theater giveaway was repackaged for the first issue of Goodman's first comic book."

Another Timely character that debuted in Motion Picture Funnies Weekly was writer-artist Paul J. Lauretta's aviator hero the American Ace, whose origin eventually appeared in two six-page stories in Marvel Mystery Comics #2–3 (Dec. 1939 – Jan. 1940), following the renaming of Marvel Comics after issue #1.

Additional features in Motion Picture Funnies Weekly #1 were "Spy Ring", starring a masked, non-costumed crimefighter, the Wasp, drawn and likely written by Arthur Pinajian under the pseudonym Jay Fletcher and reprinted as the feature "The Wasp" and the story titled "The Spy Ring Case" in Silver Streak Comics #1 (Dec. 1939); "Kar Toon and his Copy Cat" by Martin Filchock, and an activity page, "Fun-o-graphs," by Vernon Miller, both reprinted in Pelican Publications' Green Giant Comics #1 (1940); and "Jolly the Newsie" by George Peter.

Cartoonist Fred Schwab drew the cover. (Note: One source, Marvel Comics Index (see below), credits Martin Filchock, without attribution; Filchock signed his confirmed covers, for issues #2 and #4. The Grand Comics Database entry for issue #1 notes, "[T]he mustachioed cowboy on the 'now playing' posters and (to a lesser degree) the surprise lines coming from the fellow on top of the ladder's head are dead giveaways for Schwab. ... " The Official Overstreet Comic Book Price Guide (see below) credits Schwab.) Another cartoonist, Martin Filchock, drew the covers of #2 and #4, and Max Neill the cover of #3, with each of these latter covers signed by the artist.
