= Star Publications =

Defunct American comic book publisher

- Founded: 1949
- Founder: L. B. Cole; Gerhard Kramer
- Defunct: 1954
- Country of origin: United States of America
- Headquarters location: New York City (1949–1950); Buffalo, New York (1950–1954)
- Key people: L. B. Cole
- Publication types: Comic books
- Fiction genres: Crime, romance, horror, funny animal

Star Publications, Inc. was a Golden Age American comic book publisher, operating during the years 1949–1954. Founded by artist/editor L. B. Cole and lawyer Gerhard Kramer, Star specialized in horror, crime, and romance comics — but also published funny animal stories. Star was originally based in New York City before relocating to Buffalo, New York.

Notable creators who contributed to Star Publications titles included Nina Albright, Tex Blaisdell, Frank Frazetta, Milt Hammer, Alvin Hollingsworth, Joe Kubert, Pat Masulli, and Wally Wood. Co-owner Cole contributed many of his distinctive cover illustrations. Bruno Premiani worked as an editor at the company.

== History ==
In 1949, publisher Novelty Press sold its characters and artwork to Blue Bolt cover artist L. B. Cole. Using his new assets, Cole and partner Kramer began Star Publications. The company's first title was Blue Bolt, which continued the numbering of the Novelty Press title (starting with issue #102). By 1951, inspired by the popularity of horror comics like EC Comics' Tales from the Crypt, Cole shifted the Blue Bolt comic to horror, renaming it Blue Bolt Weird Tales of Terror. (The title was eventually changed again, to Ghostly Weird Stories, lasting five more issues before being canceled.)

Other notable titles published by Star included All-Famous Police Cases, Frisky Animals, Shocking Mystery Cases, and the romance titles Popular Teen-Agers, Top Love Stories, and True-To-Life Romances. The company also published a line of coloring books in comic book format (mostly with titles like The Star Coloring Book of...), consisting of full-page drawings with no word balloons and no narrative.

Due to the grisly nature of titles like Blue Bolt Weird Tales of Terror, The Horrors, and Startling Terror Tales, Star Publications was singled out in Fredric Wertham's 1954 book Seduction of the Innocent. Like many comic book publishers of the time, faced with the public outcry against the industry, and the pressures of the 1954 hearings by the United States Senate Subcommittee on Juvenile Delinquency — as well as the 1955 death of publisher Kramer — the company shut down shortly thereafter.

== Notable titles published ==
- All-Famous Police Cases (11 issues, 1952–1954)
- Blue Bolt/Blue Bolt Weird Tales of Terror/Ghostly Weird Stories (23 issues, 1949–1954)
- Frisky Animals (15 issues, 1951–1954)
- Popular Teen-Agers (19 issues, 1950–1954)
- Shocking Mystery Cases (11 issues, 1952–1954)
- Top Love Stories (17 issues, 1951–1954)
- True-To-Life Romances (21 issues, 1950–1954)
