= Holyoke Publishing =

American publishing company

Holyoke Publishing Company
- Founded: 1942
- Defunct: 1948
- Country of origin: United States
- Headquarters location: Holyoke and Springfield, Massachusetts
- Key people: Joe Kubert, Charles Quinlan, Allen Ulmer, Carmine Infantino, Dan Barry
- Publication types: Comic books
- Fiction genres: Superhero, war, humor

The Holyoke Publishing Company was an American magazine and comic-book publisher with offices in Holyoke, and Springfield, Massachusetts, and New York City, Its best-known comics characters were Blue Beetle and the superhero duo Cat-Man (later rendered as Catman, sans hyphen) and Kitten, all inherited from defunct former clients of Holyoke's printing business.

Holyoke is sometimes confused with companies owned by Frank Z. Temerson, including Helnit, Et-Es-Go, and Continental; with Worth Carnahan's Bilbara Publishing Company; and with Temerson's art director L. B. Cole's packaging clients Narrative Publishers and Aviation Press.

== Publication history ==
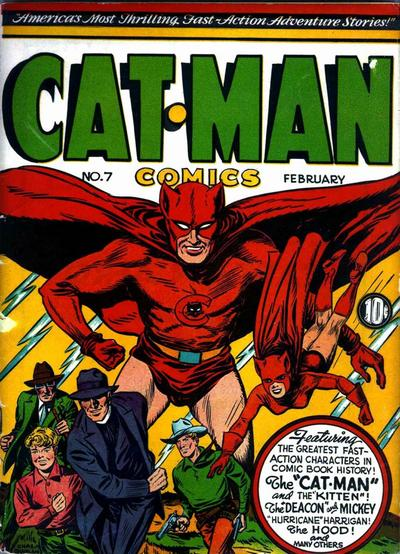
Cat-Man Comics vol. 1, #12 (7) (Feb. 1942), featuring Cat-Man and Kitten; the Deacon and Mickey; The Hood; and Hurricane Harrigan. Cover art by Charles Quinlan.

Holyoke Publishing originated with Sherman Bowles, who had taken over his family's Springfield, Massachusetts newspaper dynasty, consisting of The Republican and other papers. He entered comic-book publishing through his printing division, which took over two existing titles from Frank Z. Temerson's Helnit Publishing Company: the superhero series Cat-Man Comics and the war comics series Captain Aero Comics. This occurred in late 1941, with comics cover-dated January 1942 and February 1942. Temerson's staff, including artist Charles Quinlan, continued to produce both series. Quinlan had previously partnered with publisher Worth Carnahan in the companies Bilbara Publishing and Hit Publishing, leading them to often be erroneously grouped with Holyoke. Holyoke's next acquisition was the superhero series Blue Beetle, taking it over from Victor A. Fox's bankrupt Fox Publications beginning with issue #12 (June 1942).

The two titles acquired from Heinit reverted to Temerson's new company Et-Es-Go Magazines (later Continental Magazines) following Holyoke's Cat-Man Comics vol. 3, #7, the overall 17th issue, and Captain Aero Comics vol. 2, #4, the overall 10th issue (both Jan. 1943). Later that year, Fox won Blue Beetle back in a lawsuit; Holyoke's final issue was #30 (Feb. 1944).

By 1949, Holyoke Publishing was based in Springfield, Massachusetts and published The Open Road for Boys magazine. Holyoke Publishing leased commercial space at 1475 Broadway in Manhattan in April 1944.

== Confusion with Temerson titles ==
Because of incomplete documentation of the early days of the American comic book, some sources misstate Holyoke's role. One common resource, for example, erroneously refers to Holyoke "imprints including Et-Es-Go Mags, Continental Magazines, Helnit Publishing Co. and Tem Publishing Co." The book The Comic Book in America erroneously states that Holyoke "entered the comic-book superhero business with Crash Comics (May 1940)....", though Crash Comics Adventures was a Temerson title predating Holyoke. That book also erroneously claims Temerson as the Holyoke founder, writing, "Temerson also changed his company's name to Holyoke Publishing," and additionally claims, "By 1943, Holyoke was known as Continental Publishing." Howard Keltner's Golden Age Comic Index 1935-1955 (Revised Edition) groups Bilbara, Tem, Helnit, Et-Es-Go, Narrative Publishers and Aviation Press with Holyoke. Narrative and Aviation were both clients of Temerson's art director, L. B. Cole, giving their publications a similar look.

As well, notes the standard reference the Grand Comics Database, the Bilbara Publishing Company, one of publisher Worth Carnahan's companies, "has often been erroneously tied to Holyoke and to Frank Z. Temerson's companies because [artist] Charles Quinlan was involved in this and other Carnahan ventures, and took the character name 'Volton' (but not any other aspect of the character) with him to Helnit/Holyoke. Also, Bilbara's Cyclone Comics (featuring a character called Tornado Tom) appeared at the same time that one of Temerson's earlier companies produced Whirlwind Comics (featuring a character called Cyclone)."

== Creators ==
Among comics creators who did some of their earliest work at Holyoke are Joe Kubert, on features starring Volton, Flagman and Alias X for Cat-Man Comics and Captain Aero Comics. Dan Barry drew the Hood and Tiger Squadron. Carmine Infantino drew "Hell's Angels", a war series, for Sparkling Stars.

== Sherman Bowles ==
Sherman Hoar Bowles was the scion of three generations of men named Sam Bowles who ran the Springfield, Massachusetts newspaper The Republican and other periodicals from 1797 to 1919, when Sherman took the reins. His mother, Elizabeth Hoar, of Concord, Massachusetts, was the Beth of Louisa May Alcott's novel Little Women. Bowles attended Springfield High School; Phillips Academy, in Andover, Massachusetts; and Harvard, from which he graduated in 1912 after having served as business manager of The Harvard Crimson. After working a year at The Republican, he spent two years as circulation manager of the Philadelphia, Pennsylvania Public Ledger, then two years with the Springfield Daily News, his family's weekday-evening paper. After two years with the US Marine Corps during World War I, he became publisher of his family newspapers, which also included the Morning Union, and Sunday's The Springfield Union and Republican.

Bowles later also became an official of the Atlas Tack Company in Fairhaven, Massachusetts, and the Longchamps and Buffet Exchange restaurant chains, and held interests in Bell Aircraft, the Reo Motors, Inc., the Bowles Agawam Airport in Agawam, Massachusetts, and Western Union, as well as Alliance Manufacturing of Alliance, Ohio. He eventually turned over his holdings to a beneficial trust for his 500 newspaper employees.

Bowles died March 3, 1952, age 61, or 62 (accounts differ). He had suffered a heart attack at a friend's apartment while in New York City on business; after being treated by a physician, he returned to his own apartment at 201 East 47th Street where a building superintendent found him dead the following morning. He was survived by wife Esther Johnson Bowles, with whom he had sons Francis T. and John, and daughters Elizabeth and Amy. A cousin of the siblings was Chester Bowles, a governor of Connecticut and ambassador to India.

== Titles ==
Comic books

- Blue Beetle — 19 issues, #12-30 (June 1942 – Feb. 1944)
- Captain Aero Comics — 9 issues, vol. 1, #8 (2) - vol. 2, #4 (10) (Feb. 1942 – Jan. 1943)
- Cat-Man Comics — 12 issues, vol. 1, #11 (6) - vol. 3, #7 (17) (Jan. 1942 - Jan. 1943)
- Sparkling Stars — 32 issues, #1-33 (no #32 published) (June 1944 - March 1948)

Uncertain:

- Holyoke One-Shot — A series of 10 comics, individually titled but sequentially numbered, are listed under this name in the Overstreet Comic Book Price Guide. Published in 1944 and possibly 1945, they consist of reprints of prewar material originally published by Frank Z. Temerson companies. Undated, they contain no publishing information and it is unclear who published them.
- Veri Best Sure Fire — The Grand Comics Database notes, "Exact publication date is unknown. Several stories are continued in Captain Aero #11. Thus, this is most likely a renamed inventory issue of Captain Aero Comics with hitherto unpublished stories." "Same as Veri Best Sure Shot Comics?"
- Veri Best Sure Shot — As noted above under Veri Best Sure Fire

== Characters ==
=== Originated at Holyoke ===
- Ali Baba
- Blackout (continued at Frank Temerson's companies)
- Boxie Weaver
- Gargoyle
- Hell's Angels
- Phantom Falcon
- Red Cross (continued at Frank Temerson's companies)
- Tiger Squadron
- Volton (unrelated to Bilbara's Volton the Human Generator (Guy Newton))

=== Originated at Frank Z. Temerson companies ===
- Alias X
- Captain Aero
- Cat-Man
  - Kitten
- Commandos of the Devil Dogs
- Deacon
- Flagman
- The Hood (unrelated to Marvel Comics' Hood)
- Miss Victory
- Pied Piper (published by Helnit and Holoyoke only)
- Ragman (unrelated to DC Comics' Ragman)
- Solar (last published by Holyoke before Temerson reclaimed characters)

=== Originated at Fox Publications ===
- Blue Beetle

=== Appearing in Temerson titles and Holyoke One Shot ===
- Captain Fearless
