= Contact Comics =

American comic book series

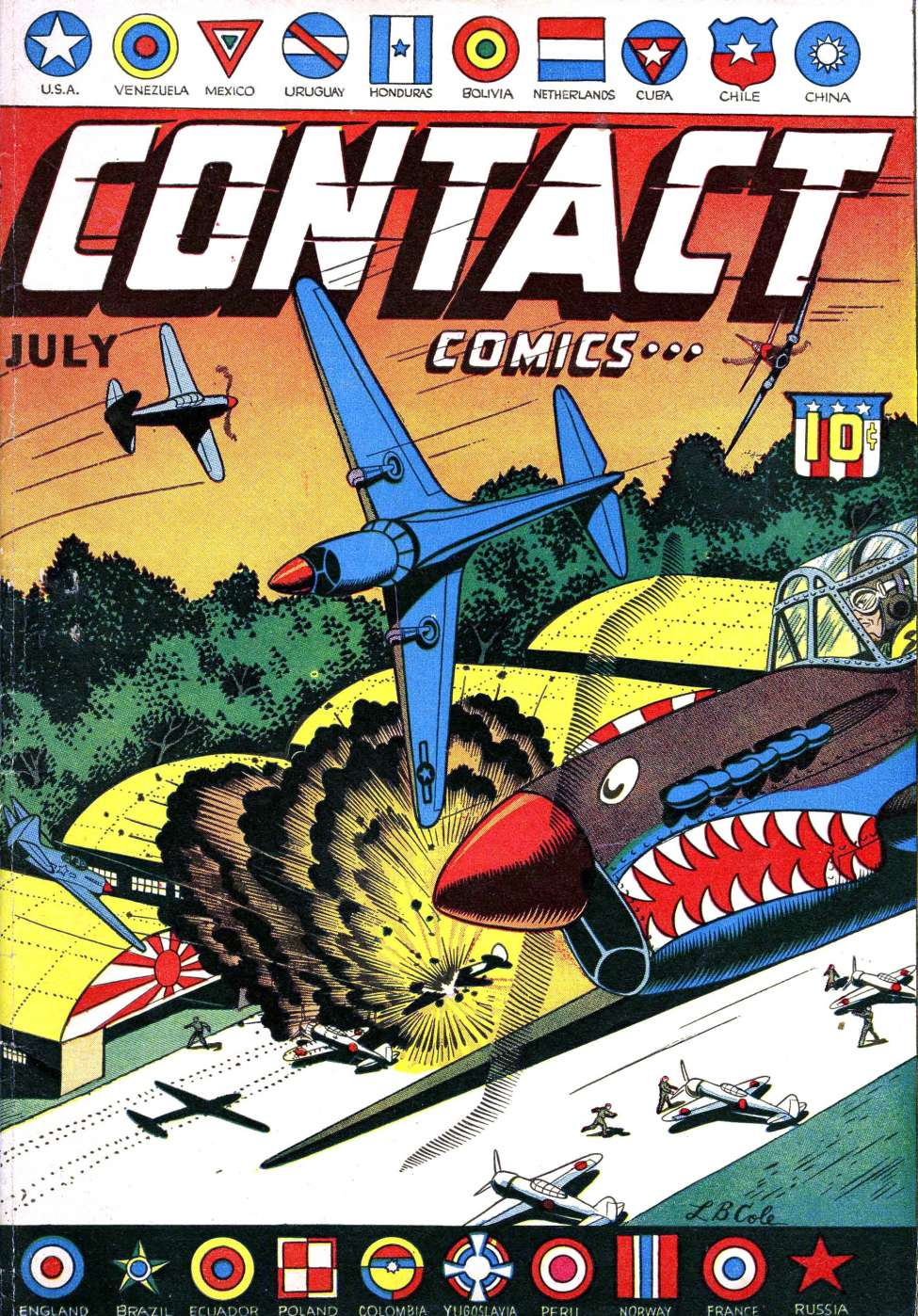
- Cover to Contact Comics #1. Art by L. B. Cole.

Publication information
- Publisher: Aviation Press
- Schedule: bimonthly
- Format: Anthology
- Publication date: July 1944 - July 1946
- No. of issues: 12
- Main character(s): Golden Eagle, Blazing Venus, Tommy Tomahawk.

Creative team
- Artist(s): Rudy Palais, Alvin Hollingsworth, Nina Albright, George Appel, Robert Sale, Paul Parker

Contact Comics is an American comic book series published during what is known as the Golden Age of Comic Books by Aviation Press. All of the stories printed in Contact Comics dealt with modern aviation.

Regular features included Golden Eagle, Blazing Venus, and Tommy Tomahawk. Contributors to the title included Rudy Palais, Alvin Hollingsworth, Nina Albright, Carmine Infantino, Harvey Kurtzman, George Appel, Robert Sale (a.k.a. Bob Q. Siege), and Paul Parker. Covers were by L.B. Cole.

A total of twelve issues were published.

== Publication history ==
Contact Comics was first issued by Aviation Press in July 1944 . Regular features in Contact Comics were : Blazing Venus, Tommy Tomahawk and Golden Eagle .
