= Cat-Man and Kitten =

1940–1946 comic book superhero

Cat-Man
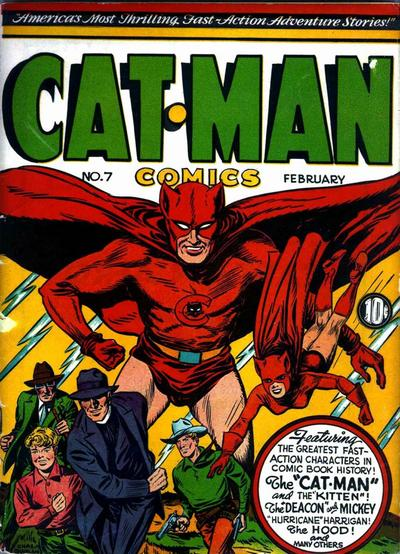

Publication information
- Publisher: Frank Z. Temerson; Holyoke Publishing
- First appearance: Crash Comics Adventures #4 (Sept. 1940)
- Created by: Artist Irwin Hasen and an unknown writer

In-story information
- Alter ego: David Merryweather
- Partnerships: Kitten
- Abilities: Super-strength, agility, night vision, nine lives

Kitten
- Kitten, in her classic costume.

Publication information
- Publisher: Frank Z. Temerson, Holyoke Publishing
- First appearance: Cat-Man Comics vol. 1 #10 (#5 on cover) (Dec. 1941)
- Created by: Artist Charles M. Quinlan and an unknown writer

In-story information
- Alter ego: Katie Conn
- Partnerships: Cat-Man
- Abilities: Trained fighter, acrobat

Cat-Man and Kitten (also Catman and Kitten) are a pair of fictional superhero characters created by artists Irwin Hasen (Cat-Man) and Charles M. Quinlan (Kitten) with unremembered writers. Cat-Man was first published in 1940 by various Frank Z. Temerson companies. Due to circumstances during World War II, an altered version of Cat-Man was published in Australia and reprinted in the 1950s. AC Comics later revived the characters in the 1980s.

Raised in the Burmese jungle by tigers and then returning to America to fight crime in the big city, the character has been described as "an odd amalgam of Batman and Tarzan".

== Golden Age ==
=== Publishing history ===
In 1940, Tem Publishing Co. (one of Temerson's several companies) published a periodical titled Crash Comics. Issue #4 featured the origin and first appearance of the Cat-Man.

Crash Comics was replaced by Cat-Man Comics in May 1941, although, like its predecessor, this new title was a superhero and adventure anthology merely headlined by the titular character. In 1942, Holyoke Publishing acquired the character, and continued publishing Cat-Man Comics.

Cat-Man Comics ran for 33 issues (12 published by Holyoke Publishing) with the last issue being numbered 32 due to some numbering inconsistencies, through 1946, when Temerson's Continental Magazines folded. Eventually, the characters fell into the public domain.

=== Fictional character biography ===
David Merrywether (Cat-Man) was raised in Burma by a tigress after his parents had been killed. From living with tigers for years, he gained superhuman abilities, such as super-strength, enhanced agility, natural night vision, and the legendary "nine lives" of cats. Eventually, David returned to the United States, where he was horrified by criminals preying on the innocent. To stop this, he became a private investigator. Later, he would become an officer in the US Army. Assigned to stateside duties, he donned a green and orange costume with a black cat-head symbol and became Cat-Man.

In Cat-Man Comics vol. 1, issue #10 (#5 on the cover), Cat-Man encountered Katie Conn, an 11-year-old circus acrobat who fell under the guardianship of her unscrupulous uncle after her parents died in a fire. The uncle forced Katie to steal things for him. Cat-Man intervened on her behalf and made sure her uncle was brought to justice. Since she no longer had a guardian, David adopted Katie. She tried to help him fight crime, sewing a matching red and yellow costume and calling herself the Kitten. At first, David tried to keep her from helping him, but Katie eventually proved herself as his sidekick and the two became partners. As the series continued, Katie matured and David was promoted to the rank of captain.

According to Jess Nevins' Encyclopedia of Golden Age Superheroes, Cat-Man "fights everything from jungle natives, ordinary criminals, and Nazis to the Bridge Destroyer, a lost city of the Aztecs, ghouls, and the runty Nazi crime-master Doctor Sinister".

Cat-Man Comics vol. 2 #13 (#8 on cover), began a new feature called "Little Leaders", again illustrated by Quinlan with an unknown writer. Cat-Man sent Katie to a summer camp where she ran into Mickey Mathews, sidekick of the Deacon, another hero featured in Cat-Man Comics. When Cat-Man and Kitten moved to Central City (the Deacon's home town) they continued having adventures both in and out of costume. The "Little Leaders" feature lasted until Cat-Man Comics' cancellation.

== Australian revision ==
Cat-Man would appear in a radically altered, black-and-white version by Australian publisher Gordon & Gotch when American import laws during World War II hindered access to the Holyoke comics. In this Australian revision, Cat-Man had no secret identity or super-powers, and continued to wear the Crash Comics outfit. However, Cat-Man was a superb fighter and a brilliant inventor, armed with a Luger pistol, a pair of night vision goggles with the ability to temporarily blind foes with a light that emanated from the goggles, and a utility belt similar to Batman's.

Cat-Man was based in a mountaintop headquarters, with his primary area of operations being that of the Australian outback. However, when situations needed, he would range all over the globe to fight crime. When he did so, he was assisted by his male sidekick, Kit; his fiancée, Terri West, an employee of the United Nations; and her father, Professor West, a famous scientist.

The Australian Cat-Man would run for a shorter period than its predecessor, spanning twelve issues. In the 1950s, Tricho would reprint them as Catman Comics #13–22. The characters also appeared in the Giant Phantom Comics series.

== Modern Age ==
=== AC Comics ===
AC Comics' revival of Cat-Man and Kitten.

In the 1980s, publisher AC Comics created a retconned version of the characters as part of their universe. In this version, Katie's change from a young girl to an adult was given an explanation: mortally wounded by one of their enemies, Katie's life was saved when Cat-Man transferred one of his 9 lives into her. However, this had the effect of automatically aging her into adulthood, although she still retained a child's mentality, causing Cat-Man some consternation in his secret identity. Eventually, her emotional maturity caught up with her physical form, and the pair were married. They soon after decided to enter the Vault of Superheroes, a suspended animation program being run by the US government to preserve heroes should they be needed in the future.

Released from the Vault in the 1980s, they adapted to modern life and became allies to Miss Victory and the members of Femforce. Their primary nemesis, Dr. Macabre, was also revived from a similar hibernation and continues to pose a threat to the Merryweathers.

AC Comics has printed modern stories of Cat-Man and Kitten in its Men of Mystery anthology; it also reprints some of the Holyoke stories that do not contradict its current continuity.

Due to the female-oriented nature of the AC Comics universe, the duo is sometimes billed as Kitten and Cat-Man.

=== Dynamite Entertainment ===
In 2008, Cat-Man and Kitten appeared in flashbacks in Dynamite Entertainment's Project Superpowers. In the Project Superpowers: Chapter Two Prelude one-shot, it was stated that the two heroes would appear in future issues in this line — Cat-Man as a feral being called Man-Cat and Kitten as part of a team of kid heroes and sidekicks.

Project Superpowers: Chapter Two showcased an increasing line of public domain superheroes including Cat-Man and Kitten. After being freed from the urn, the Kitten finds herself allied with several teen sidekicks, including the Boy King and his Giant. The group of young heroes sets out to find some of their missing mentors and begin to discover they were not just blessed with increased abilities, but in some instances cursed by them. Kitten discovers Cat-Man living like a feral beast in the jungle. His senses, strength and agility increased to the level of the great cats he emulated, but his intelligence and demeanor regressed to a similar state and the teen heroes had to snare Cat-Man like a wild beast.

Cat-Man and Kitten become pivotal characters in one of the side stories throughout this series. By series end, Cat-Man regains enough of his senses for Kitten to know the man is still inside the beast.

A new series titled Cat-man and Kitten was announced in July 2022, with the creative team consisting of Jeff Parker and Joseph Cooper.

== In other media ==
In September 2023, YouTuber Austin McConnell released a pilot for an animated web series on YouTube titled The Sensational Cat-Man based on the public-domain comic.
