= L. B. Cole =

American cartoonist

- Born: Leonard Hildebrandt Cohen; August 28, 1918 Bronx, NY
- Died: December 5, 1995 (aged 77) Fresh Meadows, Queens, U.S.
- Areas: Artist, Editor, Publisher
- Notable works: Star Publications
- Awards: Inkpot Award (1981); The Will Eisner Award Hall of Fame (1999)

Leonard Brandt Cole (August 28, 1918 – December 5, 1995), commonly known as L. B. Cole, was a comic book artist, editor, and publisher who worked during the Golden Age of Comic Books, producing work in various genres. Cole was particularly known for his bold covers, featuring what he referred to as "poster colors"—the use of primary colors often over black backgrounds. In addition to his covers, Cole did interior art for comics published by Holyoke Publications, Gilberton, and Ajax/Farrell. He also worked as an editor for Holyoke in the 1940s.

== Biography ==
Before entering the comic book industry, Cole worked as an art director in the lithography industry.

Cole's comic book career started in the early 1940s, mainly as a cover artist for titles such as Suspense Comics (Et-Es-Go Magazines) and Contact Comics (Aviation Press). He soon became known for his distinctive covers: examples include the covers to Mask Comics #1, Mask Comics #2 (Rural Home), Contact Comics #12, and Captain Flight Comics #11 (Four Star Publications). An avid science fiction fan, Cole was known for slipping in sci-fi elements even when they weren't appropriate, such as rocket ships and ray guns appearing on the covers of Captain Flight Comics and Contact Comics. (Both titles were supposed to be devoted to contemporary aviation.) During this time, Cole created the character "Wiggles the wonderworm" who appeared in five issues of Taffy Comics, published by Rural Home/Orbit Publications.

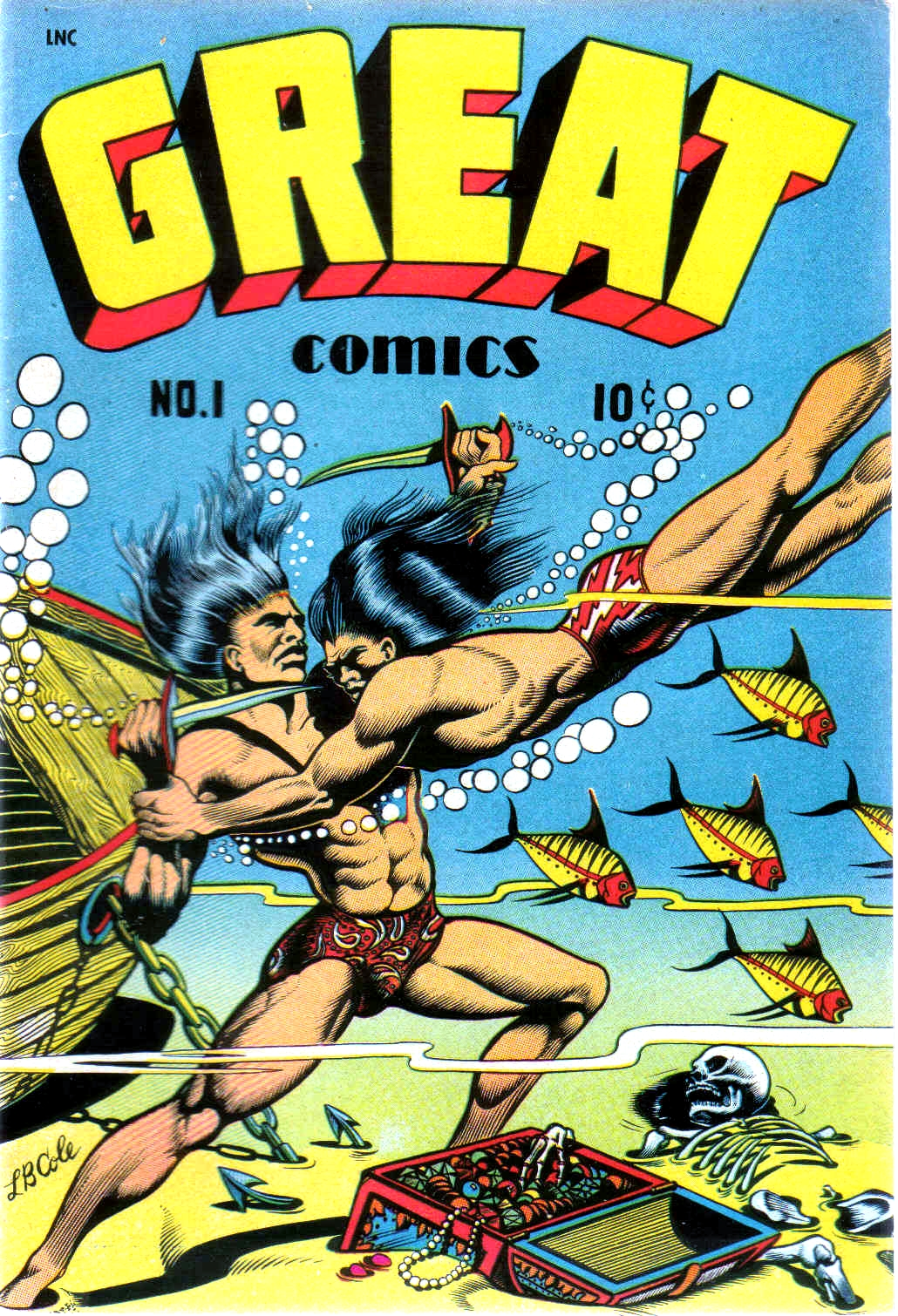
Great Comics 1 (1945) Cover art by L. B. Cole

From 1942 to 1948, Cole ran his own comics studio, often packaging work for a variety of publishers, including Ace Magazines, Aviation Press, Chesler Publications, Farrell Publications, Fawcett Comics, Holyoke Publishing, Magazine Enterprises, Spotlight Comics, Novelty Press, Orbit Publications, and Rural Home Publishing.

In 1949, publisher Novelty Press sold its characters and artwork to Cole, who was the cover artist for Novelty's Blue Bolt Comics. Using his new assets, Cole began Star Publications, which operated from 1949 to 1955.

After the closure of Star, Cole continued doing cover illustrations, many for Classics Illustrated Junior. In the early 1960s, Cole was art director and editor at Dell Comics. From the mid-1960s through the 1970s, Cole created instructional materials and audio-visuals for University Films.

He gained further recognition when comic fandom grew in the late 1960s and through the 1970s. In 1981, he created a new painting that was featured on the cover of the 11th edition of the Overstreet Comic Book Price Guide. During this same time, he began selling re-creations of his classic covers. In the early 1990s, Ernie Gerber published his two-volume Photo Journal Guide to Comic Books which featured on its covers a number of Cole's covers. As a result, the demand for Cole's work increased dramatically.

Cole married Ellen Kovack in 1942; she later became a proficient letterer in her own right.

Cole died of a heart attack on December 5, 1995.

== Awards ==
An Inkpot Award recipient in 1981, Cole was posthumously inducted into the Will Eisner Award Hall of Fame in 1999.
