= Dan Barry (cartoonist) =

American cartoonist (1923–1997)

Daniel Barry (July 11, 1923 – January 25, 1997) was an American cartoonist. Beginning in comic books during the 1940s with Leonard Starr, Stan Drake and his brother Sy Barry, he helped define and exemplify a particular kind of "New York Slick" style which dominated comics until the Marvel Revolution brought attention to the Jack Kirby style. This style was characterized by careful attention to lines and the clear delineation of textures.

== Work ==
Excerpt from Flash Gordon daily strip. Art by Dan Barry.

Barry's early comics work included Airboy, Doc Savage, Blue Bolt, as well as covers for the Captain Midnight comic book. After a period serving in the Air Force, Barry returned to comics. Barry assisted Burne Hogarth with the Tarzan daily strip; from 1947 to 1948 Barry took over the Tarzan strip. In 1951 Barry revived the Flash Gordon daily strip. Barry was initially assisted with the strip by Harvey Kurtzman, who wrote the scripts while Barry provided the illustrations. Comics historian Drew Friedman noted "Barry and Kurtzman had a famously uneasy and brief partnership, but their version of Flash Gordon remains outstanding". Later, other writers including Harry Harrison, Bob Kanigher, Sid Jacobson, Larry Shaw and Bill Finger contributed scripts to Barry's Flash Gordon series. In addition, at various times during his tenure, he was assisted in his artwork by a number of artists including Bob Fujitani, Fred Kida, and Frank Frazetta. When artist Mac Raboy died in 1967, Barry assumed responsibility of the Flash Gordon Sunday strip also. He also drew The Amazing Spider-Man from July 1986 to January 1987. He created the official poster for the 1980 movie version of Flash Gordon. After moving to Cleveland, Georgia, he was assisted in his work by artist Gail Beckett. In 1990, he left Flash Gordon altogether when the syndicate, King Features, asked him to take a cut in pay. He drew the daily Spider-Man comic strip for two weeks in 1986.

His last work was for Dark Horse Comics, where he wrote and drew many Indiana Jones and Predator comic books. In recognition for his work, he was awarded the Inkpot Award in 1991.

=== Inspiration ===
Between 1954 and 1957, Leopoldo Ortiz and José Ortiz published a Western adventure comic strip Dan Barry el Terremoto (es) at the Spanish publisher Editorial Maga. They named the main character after the American artist.
