= Frank Z. Temerson =

American comic book publisher (1890–1963)

- Born: Frank Zelig Temerson; July 4, 1890 Warsaw, Poland
- Died: July 25, 1963 (aged 73) Birmingham, Alabama, U.S.
- Area: Comic book publishing
- Notable works: Ultem Publications; Helnit Publishing; Et-Es-Go Magazines; Continental Magazines

Frank Z. Temerson (1890–1963) was a comic book publisher from the Golden Age of Comic Books. Temerson's imprints included Ultem Publications, Brookwood Publications, Helnit Publishing, Et-Es-Go Magazines, and Continental Magazines.

Notable titles published by Temerson included Captain Aero Comics, Cat-Man Comics, and Suspense Comics; notable characters included Cat-Man and Kitten and Miss Victory. L. B. Cole worked as an art director for many of Temerson's earliest comics; other notable creators associated with Temerson included Tony DiPreta, Irwin Hasen, Gil Kane, Don Rico, and Charles M. Quinlan.

Temerson often used the names of family members and associates as proxies for companies which he actually owned and operated.

== Biography ==
Temerson was born in Warsaw, Poland, the third child of Jacob (a dry goods merchant) and Mindel Temerson. In 1892, when Frank was two years old, his family moved to the United States, settling in Birmingham, Alabama. Frank's parents subsequently had four additional children, including Frank's younger sisters Esther, Goldie, and Ethel. The family were members of Birmingham's Temple Emanu-El synagogue, whose founding president was businessman, poet, and humanitarian Samuel Ullman.

Temerson finished school after the eighth grade, going to work at his father's dry goods store. In 1913, despite never having gone to high school or college, Temerson was enrolled at the Chattanooga College of Law, which was not an accredited law school but which offered courses in legal studies. In 1914 Temerson was working as a "lawyer" (although he never graduated from the Chattanooga College of Law or passed the state bar exam). Temerson worked as an attorney in Birmingham for a couple of years before moving to Detroit in 1917. Shortly thereafter he registered with the draft board (where he was described as "short, stout, with brown eyes, brown hair, and partly bald"). Temerson served overseas with the Army during World War I from 1918 to 1919.

Returning to Birmingham after the war, he soon connected with his old synagogue's president's nephew, I. W. (Isaac Wise) Ullman (1873–1947), who was also in the distribution business. Temerson and Ullman became business partners, moving into pulp magazine printing and distribution. Companies they jointly owned, under the name Ultem Publications (a combination of the first syllables from both names, Ullman and Temerson), included Vamos Color Printing and Inspirational Publications. By 1935, Ultem was headquartered in New York City, at 381 Fourth Avenue, and in 1937 the company was located at 404 Fourth Avenue. Ultem published Modern Movies, Movie Stars Handies, Movie Humor, High Heel Magazine, and Silk Stocking.

In 1937, Ultem moved into the burgeoning comic book business. That year Ultem bought out Harry "A" Chesler's comic book titles Star Comics and Star Ranger. In September 1937, Ultem acquired the Comics Magazine Company's titles Funny Pages and Funny Picture Stories, retaining Chesler as the packager for both his own previous titles and the two that were continued from the Comics Magazine Co. Financial difficulties forced Ultem to sell some of its properties, including The Clock, to Everett M. "Busy" Arnold's Quality Comics. By January 1938, Ultem was bought out by Centaur Publications.

Beginning in 1939, Temerson went solo, publishing comics during the period 1939–1941 under the names Tem Publishing, Nita Publishing, and, most prominently, Helnit Publishing. Temerson also published with Isaac W. Ullman, under the name Brookwood Publications, known for the only title under the collaboration, Speed Comics, before being sold to Leo Greenwald, then eventually turned to Harvey Comics. Helnit published six issues of Green Hornet Comics, with the writing attributed to Fran Striker, starting in December 1940. Assets from Helnit — including the superhero series Cat-Man Comics and the war comics series Captain Aero Comics — were acquired by Holyoke Publishing in late 1941, with comics cover-dated January 1942 and February 1942. Temerson's staff, including artist Charles Quinlan, continued to produce both series.

In 1943, the two titles acquired from Heinit reverted to Temerson's new company Et-Es-Go Magazines (likely named after Temerson's younger sisters Ethel, Esther, and Goldie), which soon transitioned to Continental Magazines. Pioneering female publisher, editor, and cartoonist Ray Herman started her career as an assistant to Temerson in 1943. Other titles published by Temerson in the period 1943–1946 were Suspense Comics and Terrific Comics.

Some sources indicate Temerson was behind Continental Publications in 1950.

Temerson died in 1963 at age 73.

== Comic book titles published ==
- Captain Aero Comics [Helnit, Et-Es-Go, Continental Magazines] (14 issues, Dec. 1941–Aug. 1946) — published by Holyoke Publishing in 1942–1943
- Captain Fearless Comics [Helnit] (2 issues, Aug.–Sept. 1941)
- Cat-Man Comics [Helnit, Et-Es-Go, Continental Magazines] (21 issues, May 1941–Aug. 1946) — published by Holyoke Publishing in 1942–1943
- Crash Comics Adventures [Tem] (5 issues, May–Nov. 1940)
- Foodini [Continental Publications] (4 issues, March–Aug. 1950)
- Funny Pages [Ultem] (5 issues, Sept. 1937–Jan. 1938) — taken over from Comics Magazine Company; continued by Centaur Publications
- Funny Picture Stories [Ultem] (5 issues, Sept. 1937–Jan. 1938) — taken over from Comics Magazine Company; continued by Centaur Publications
- Green Hornet Comics [Helnit] (6 issues, Dec. 1940–Aug. 1941) — continued by Harvey Comics
- Speed Comics [Brookwood] (11 issues, Oct. 1939–Aug. 1940) — continued by Greenwald Publications (later known as Harvey Comics)
- Star Comics [Ultem] (3 issues, Oct./Nov. 1937–Jan. 1938) — taken over from Chesler/Dynamic; continued by Centaur Publications
- Star Ranger [Ultem] (3 issues, Oct./Nov. 1937–Jan. 1938) — taken over from Chesler/Dynamic; continued by Centaur Publications
- Suspense Comics [Et-Es-Go Magazines, Continental Magazines] (12 issues, Dec. 1943–Sept. 1946)
- Terrific Comics [Et-Es-Go Magazines, Continental Magazines] (6 issues, Jan–Nov., 1944)
- Whirlwind Comics [Nita] (3 issues, June–Sept. 1940)

== Comic book characters published by Temerson companies ==
- Alias X
- Captain Aero
- Captain Fearless
- Cat-Man
  - Kitten
- Commandos of the Devil Dogs
- Deacon
- Flagman
- The Hood (unrelated to Marvel Comics' Hood)
- Miss Victory
- Pied Piper (published by Helnit and Holoyoke only)
- Ragman (unrelated to DC Comics' Ragman)
- Solar (last published by Holyoke before Temerson reclaimed characters)

== See also ==
- Holyoke Publishing
