= Captain Aero Comics =

Comic book series

Captain Aero Comics is a comic book from the Golden Age of Comics, originally published by Helnit Publishing and acquired by Holyoke Publishing in 1942. Issue #1 was published in December 1941, and it ran through issue #26 (August 1946).

Captain Aero's first adventure was written by Allen Ulmer and illustrated by Ray Willner. Captain Aero is a Flying ace for the US Army, who patrols the skies with "his little Chinese pal, Chop Suey". In his first adventure, he tests out an experimental P-60 plane and escorts a flight of Canadian flyers taking planes to England, as America had not yet entered World War II. According to Jess Nevins' Encyclopedia of Golden Age Superheroes, "he fights Yellow Perils like the Tibetan Black Lama, evil German pilots like the Black Baron, and death-ray-wielding mad scientists".

He also had a fan club, The Sky Scouts, which was advertised on the comic's cover.
