= Novelty Press =

Defunct American comic book publishing company

- Parent company: Curtis Publishing Company
- Founded: 1940
- Defunct: 1949
- Country of origin: United States
- Headquarters location: New York City
- Key people: Dick Briefer, Joe Simon, Jack Kirby
- Publication types: Comic books
- Fiction genres: Superhero, Crime

Novelty Press (a.k.a. Premium Service Co., Inc.; a.k.a. Novelty Publications; a.k.a. Premier Group) was an American Golden Age comic-book publisher that operated from 1940 to 1949. It was the comic book imprint of Curtis Publishing Company, publisher of The Saturday Evening Post. Among Novelty's best-known and longest-running titles were the companion titles Blue Bolt and Target Comics.

During its nine-year run, Novelty had a roster of creators that included Al Avison, Dan Barry, Carl Burgos, L.B. Cole, Bill Everett, Al Gabriele, Joe Gill, Tom Gill, Jack Kirby, Tarpé Mills, Al Plastino, Don Rico, Joe Simon, Mickey Spillane, and Basil Wolverton.

Although published in Philadelphia, Novelty Press's editorial offices were in New York City.

== History ==
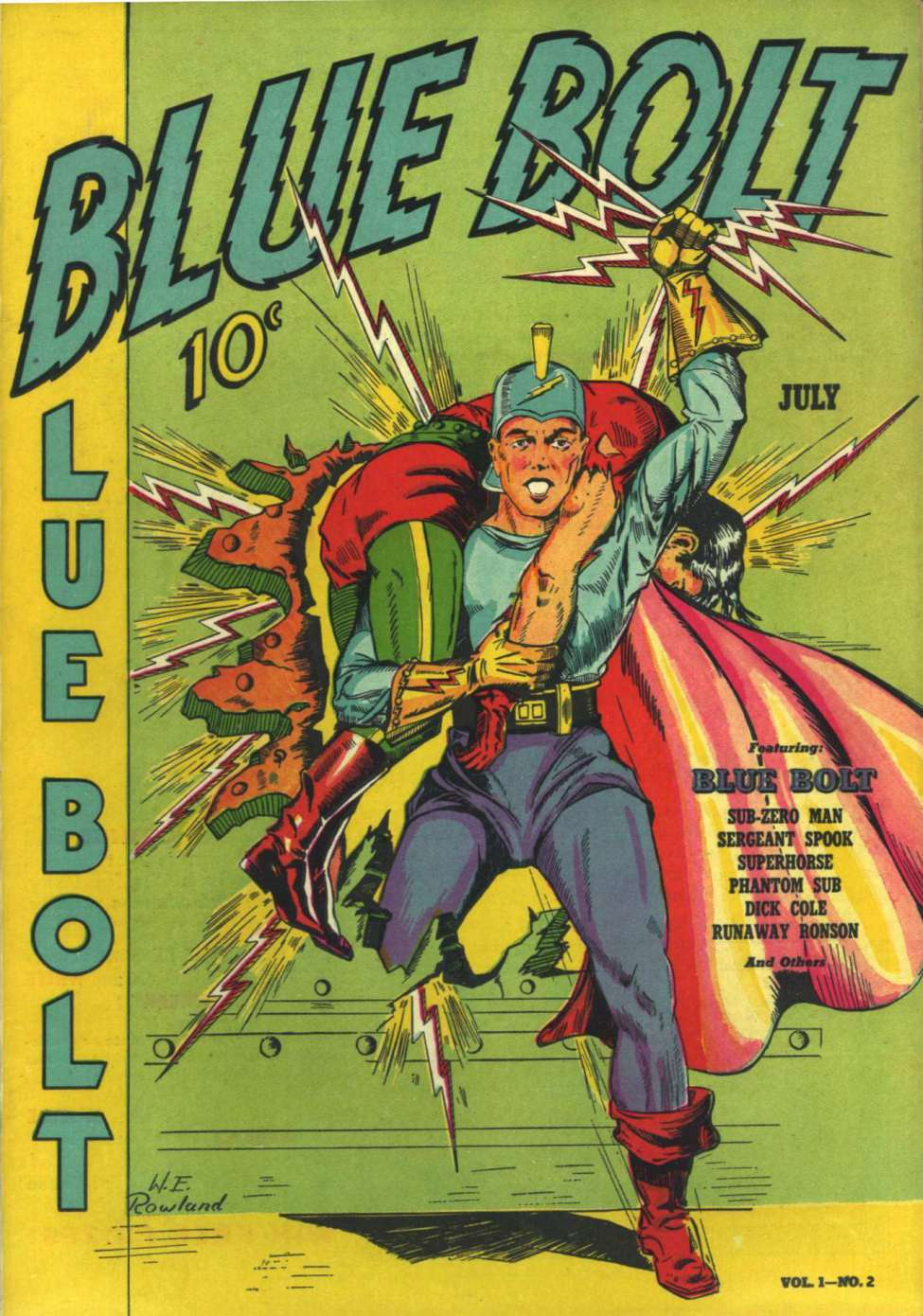
Blue Bolt Comics #2 (July 1940). Cover art by W.E. Rowland

Novelty Press launched its first title, Target Comics, debuted with a cover date of February 1940, followed shortly thereafter by Blue Bolt.

Target Comics featured such stars as Bull's-Eye Bill, Lucky Byrd, and The White Streak (Target's first superhero). Material for the book was supplied by Funnies, Inc., a packager also responsible for many of Marvel Comics' early characters. Creators included Bill Everett, Joe Simon, and Tarpé Mills. Basil Wolverton's Spacehawk (which originated in Circus comics) made its Target Comics debut with issue #5, and ran for many issues. The superhero Target, created by cartoonist Dick Briefer under the pen nam "Dick Hamilton", was introduced in issue #10 (Nov. 1940), accompanied by the Targeteers the following issue. The Overstreet Comic Book Price Guide suggests that the first comic book letter column may have appeared in Target Comics #6. The page in question also has an early mention of comic-book collecting.)

Blue Bolt's title character superhero was created by Joe Simon, and Blue Bolt #2 (July 1940) featured the first pairing of the longstanding and pioneering creative team of Simon and Jack Kirby.

4 Most, launched in 1941, was Novelty's answer to DC Comics' omnibus title World's Finest Comics and All American's Comic Cavalcade.

Young King Cole, debuting in 1945, was an anthology title headlined by one of the comic genre's first private detectives.

In 1949, due to the growing criticism over violence in comic books, Novelty Press sold its assets to Blue Bolt cover artist L.B. Cole. Using his new assets, Cole began his own company, Star Publications.

== Titles ==
- 4 Most (36 issues, 1941–1949) — Regular features included Cadet, Dan'l Flannel, Edison Bell, and Lem the Grem, the "Trouble-Loving Gremlin".
- Blue Bolt (110 issues, 1940–1951) — Joe Simon and Jack Kirby teamed for fewer than 12 issues, turning over the book to successors including Dan Barry, Tom Gill, and Mickey Spillane Malcolm Kildale's Sgt. Spook, an undead detective, was a regular backup feature for most of its run. Blue Bolt ran for 110 issues, the first 102 published by Novelty Press, and the rest published by Star Publications.
- Dick Cole, The Wonder Boy (10 issues, 1948-1949) — A popular backup feature in Blue Bolt (and later 4 Most), "Dick Cole" was spun off into its own title from 1948 to 1950 (the first five issues published by Novelty Press, the rest by Star Publications). Dick Cole was created by cartoonist Bob Davis but others who handled the character include Al Fagaly (Super Duck), James Wilcox (Dolly O'Dare), and Jack Hearne (The Cadet).
- Frisky Fables — 37 issues, 1945–49
- Guns Against Gangsters — 7 issues, 1948–1949
- Humdinger — 8 issues, 1946–1947
- Target Comics (105 issues, 1940–1949)
- Young King Cole (title later changed to Criminals on the Run) (23 issues, 1945-1948) — Regular backup features included Doctor Doom, "The Resourceful Professor of Criminology"; Foxy, "Office Boy in the Detective Bureau"; Homer K. Beagle, "The Demon Detective"; Larry Broderick, "City Detective"; and Tony Gayle, "Glamorous Detective Model".

=== Regular backup features ===
- Bull's-Eye Bill (Target Comics)
- Cadet (4 Most)
- Dan'l Flannel (4 Most)
- Dick Cole, The Wonder Boy (4 Most and Blue Bolt)
- Doctor Doom (Young King Cole)
- Edison Bell (4 Most)
- Foxy (Young King Cole)
- Homer K. Beagle (Young King Cole)
- Larry Broderick (Young King Cole)
- Lem the Grem (4 Most)
- Lucky Byrd (Target Comics)
- Sgt. Spook (Blue Bolt)
- Target and the Targeteers (4 Most and Target Comics)
- Tony Gayle (Young King Cole)
- The White Streak (Target Comics)
