= Marvel Mystery Comics =

American comic book series

Marvel Comics Marvel Mystery Comics Marvel Tales
- First cover appearance, the Sub-Mariner: Marvel Mystery Comics #4 (Feb. 1940); art by Alex Schomburg

Publication information
- Publisher: Marvel Comics
- Format: Ongoing series
- Genre: Superhero (#1–92); Horror (#93–159)
- Publication date: October 1939 – August 1957
- No. of issues: 159

Marvel Mystery Comics (first issue titled simply Marvel Comics) is an American comic book series published during the 1930s–1940s period known to fans and historians as the Golden Age of Comic Books. It was the first publication of Marvel Comics' predecessor, Timely Comics, a division of Timely Publications.

In 1949, with the popularity of superheroes having waned, the book was converted into the horror anthology Marvel Tales from issue #93–159 (Aug. 1949 – Aug. 1957), when it ceased publication.

== Publication history ==
=== Premiere issue: Marvel Comics #1 ===
In 1939, pulp magazine publisher Martin Goodman expanded into the newly emerging comic book field by buying content from comics packager Funnies, Inc.

On August 31, 1939, his first effort, Marvel Comics #1 (cover-dated Oct. 1939), from his company Timely Publications, was published. This featured the first appearances of writer-artist Carl Burgos' android superhero the Human Torch, Paul Gustavson's costumed detective the Angel, and the first generally available appearance of Bill Everett's mutant anti-hero Namor the Sub-Mariner. The Sub-Mariner was created for the unpublished movie-theater giveaway comic Motion Picture Funnies Weekly earlier that year, with the eight-page original story now expanded by four pages. Also included were Al Anders' Western hero the Masked Raider (Jim Gardley), canceled after appearing in the first twelve issues; the jungle lord feature "The Adventures of Ka-Zar the Great", with Ben Thompson beginning a five-issue adaptation of the story "King of Fang and Claw" by Bob Byrd (pseudonym of Martin Goodman) in Goodman's pulp magazine Ka-Zar #1 (Oct. 1936); the non-continuing-character story "Jungle Terror", featuring an adventurer named Ken Masters and Professor John Roberts, written by the quirkily named Tohm Dixon; "Now I'll Tell One", five single-panel, black-and-white gag cartoons by Fred Schwab, on the inside front cover; and "Burning Rubber", a two-page prose story by Ray Gill about auto racing. A painted cover by veteran science fiction pulp artist Frank R. Paul featured the Human Torch, looking much different than in the interior story.

That initial magazine quickly sold out 80,000 copies, prompting Goodman to produce a second printing, cover-dated November 1939 and identical except for a black bar in the inside-front-cover indicia over the October date and the November date added at the end. That sold approximately 800,000 copies. With a hit on his hands, Goodman began assembling an in-house staff, hiring Funnies, Inc. writer-artist Joe Simon as editor. Simon brought along his collaborator, artist Jack Kirby, followed by artist Syd Shores.

=== As Marvel Mystery Comics ===
The Human Torch and the Sub-Mariner would continue to star in the long-running title even after receiving their own solo comic-book series shortly afterward. The Angel, who was featured on the covers of issues #2–3, would appear in every issue through #79 (Dec. 1946).

Other characters introduced in the title include the aviator the American Ace (#2, Dec. 1939), with part one of his origin reprinted, like the first part of the Sub-Mariner's, from Motion Picture Funnies Weekly #1; the private detective the Ferret (Leslie Lenrow) by writer Stockbridge Winslow and artist Irwin Hasen (issues 4-9, February 1940-July 1940); and writer-artist Steve Dahlman's robot hero Electro, the Marvel of the Age (appearing in every issue from #4–19, Feb. 1940 – May 1941). Issue #13 saw the first appearance of the Vision, the inspiration for the same-name Marvel Comics superhero created in 1968. The original Vision appeared in solo stories through Marvel Mystery Comics #48. Also featured in the title was Terry Vance, The School Boy Sleuth by Ray Gill and Bob Oksner (debuting in issue #10, August 1940 until #57, July 1944, as well as appearing in the first two issues of the revived Mystic Comics shortly thereafter).

The serials appearing in Marvel Mystery Comics include (in order of appearance):

- The Human Torch (October 1939 – June 1949)
- The Angel (October 1939 – December 1946)
- The Sub-Mariner (October 1939 – April 1949)
- The Masked Raider (October 1939 – October 1940)
- Ken Masters/Professor John Roberts (October 1939)
- The Adventures of Ka-Zar the Great (October 1939 – January 1942)
- American Ace (December 1939 – January 1940)
- Electro, the Marvel of the Age (February 1940 – May 1941)
- Ferret, Mystery Detective (February 1940 – July 1940)
- Terry Vance, The School Boy Sleuth (August 1940 – July 1944)
- The Vision (November 1940 – October 1943)
- The Patriot (July 1941 - June 1949)
- Jimmy Jupiter (February 1942 - October 1943)

=== Marvel Tales (1949–1957) ===
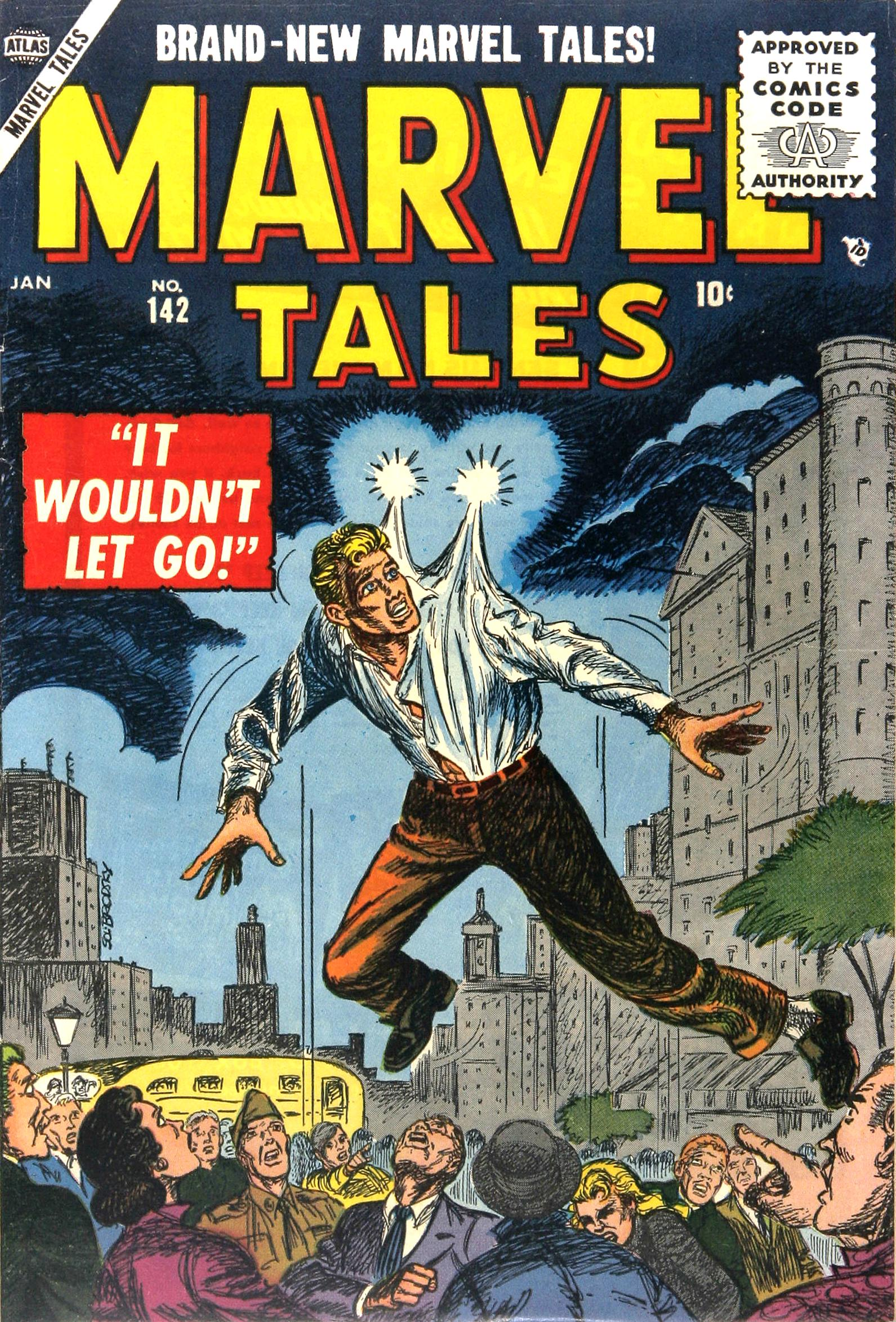
Cover of Marvel Tales #142 (Jan. 1956), art by Sol Brodsky and Carl Burgos.

The first Marvel Tales was the direct continuation of the superhero anthology Marvel Mystery Comics, published by Marvel Comics' initial iteration, Timely Comics. This series ran through issue #92 (cover-dated June 1949). Beginning with issue #93 (Aug. 1949), it became Marvel Tales, an anthology of horror, fantasy, and science fiction stories. The bulk of this series was published under the company name Atlas Comics.

Marvel Tales included among its contributors writer and editor-in-chief Stan Lee and such comics artists as Golden Age veterans Harry Anderson, Carl Burgos, Bill Everett, Fred Kida, Mike Sekowsky, Syd Shores, and Ogden Whitney, and, early in their careers, Dick Ayers, Gene Colan, Tony DiPreta, Mort Drucker, Russ Heath, Bernard Krigstein, Joe Maneely, Joe Sinnott, and Basil Wolverton, among others. Issue #147 featured one of Steve Ditko's first stories for Marvel, "The Vanishing Martians". The series ran 67 issues under the new title, through #159 (Aug. 1957). It ended because of the collapse of Atlas's distributor, American News Company, and the subsequent restructuring that limited the number of comics the company could publish in a month.

An issue of Marvel Tales was included in a display of covers representative of the "Crime, Horror & Weird Variety" at the April 1954 hearings of the United States Senate Subcommittee on Juvenile Delinquency.

Marvel published a different series of the same name in the 1960s, primarily reprinting Spider-Man stories.

== Reprints ==
- Marvel Comics #1 (50th anniversary edition; reprints #1, 1990; ISBN 0-87135-729-1)
- Marvel Comics #1: 70th Anniversary Edition (reprints #1 with modern coloring, 2009)
- Golden Age Marvel Comics Omnibus (Marvel Comics #1; Marvel Mystery Comics #2–12)
- Golden Age Marvel Comics Omnibus Vol. 2 (Marvel Mystery Comics #13-24)
- Marvel Masterworks: Golden Age Marvel Comics Vol. 1 (Marvel Comics #1, Marvel Mystery Comics #2–4)
- Marvel Masterworks: Golden Age Marvel Comics Vol. 2 (Marvel Mystery Comics #5–8)
- Marvel Masterworks: Golden Age Marvel Comics Vol. 3 (Marvel Mystery Comics #9–12)
- Marvel Masterworks: Golden Age Marvel Comics Vol. 4 (Marvel Mystery Comics #13–16)
- Marvel Masterworks: Golden Age Marvel Comics Vol. 5 (Marvel Mystery Comics #17–20)
- Marvel Masterworks: Golden Age Marvel Comics Vol. 6 (Marvel Mystery Comics #21–24)
- Marvel Masterworks: Golden Age Marvel Comics Vol. 7 (Marvel Mystery Comics #25-28)

== See also ==
- Marvel Science Stories
- Miss America (Marvel Comics)
