= Target and the Targeteers =

The Target
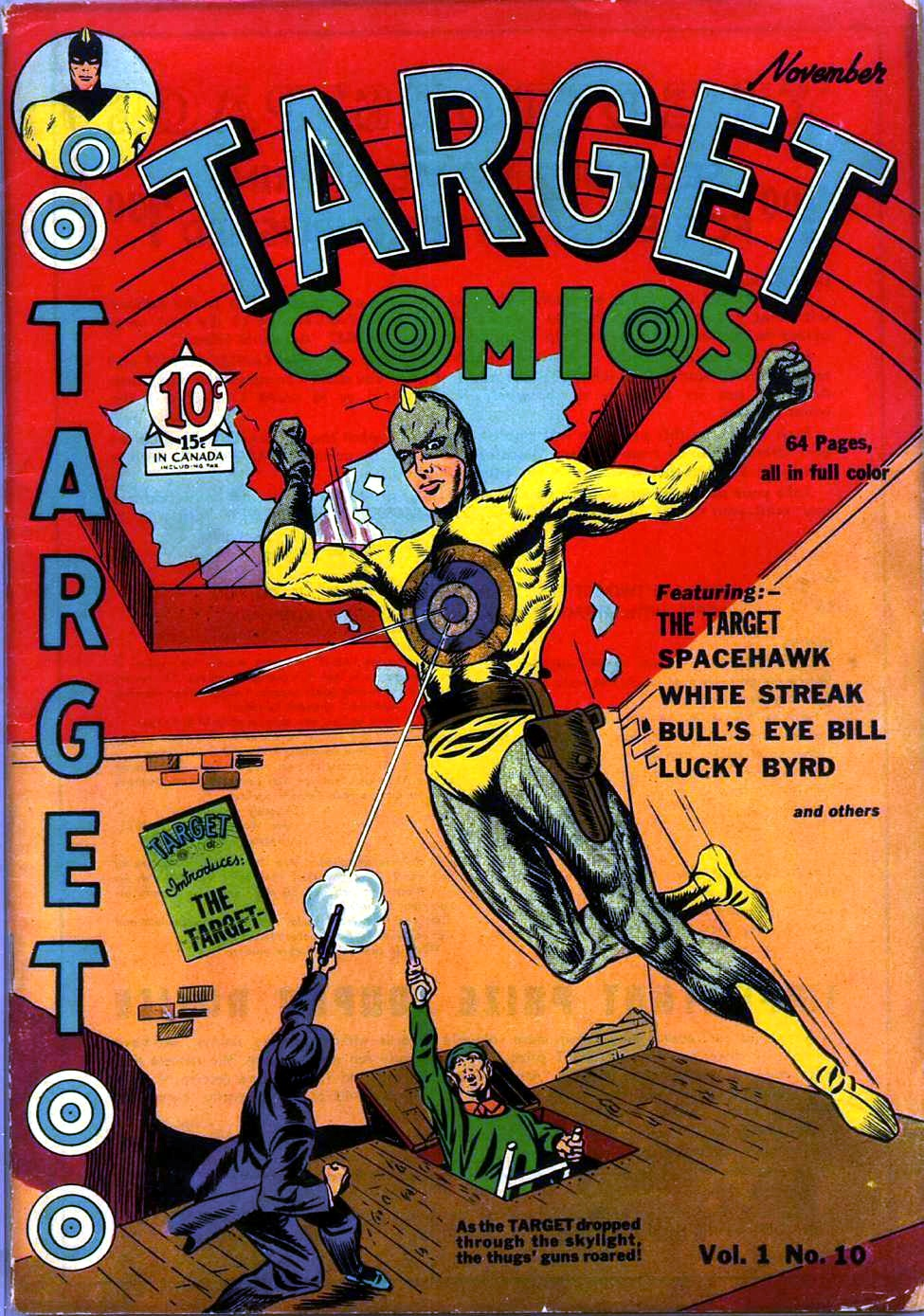
- Cover for Target Comics #10 (November 1940), art by Joe Simon.

Publication information
- Publisher: Novelty Press
- First appearance: Target Comics #10 (Nov. 1940)
- Created by: Dick Hamilton

In-story information
- Alter ego: Niles Reed
- Partnerships: The Targeteers
- Abilities: Bond with teammates (see below); espionage skills, scientific knowledge; wears a bulletproof costume.

The Target and the Targeteers are fictional characters, a trio of superheroes who first appeared in 1940, in Target Comics (after which the characters were named) from Novelty Press.

== History ==
Target Comics debuted with a premiere issue cover-dated February 1940, but it was not until issue #10 (Nov. 1940) that the Target first appeared; the two Targeteers were introduced the following issue. The characters were created by Dick Briefer, using the pseudonym Dick Hamilton. The Targeteers appeared in Target Comics through issue #95; Target itself ended with issue #105.

The series was penciled by Bob Wood, with Jerry Robinson and George Roussos providing inks, backgrounds, and letters during the early issues. Roussos recalled "Bob was just starving at the time trying to meet his deadlines, so I used to stay up all night for 2 or 3 days in a row while everyone fell asleep, helping out."

In 1999, the Target appeared without his partners in issue #24 of the AC Comics title Men of Mystery Comics. In 2008, the Target and the Targeteers were among the many public domain characters to appear in Project Superpowers, a miniseries from Dynamite Entertainment. The heroes were given new powers in this series. Also in 2008, issue #2 of the Age of Adventure comic Legendary Heroes featured reprints of Golden Age stories of Target and the Targeteers.

== Fictional biography ==
=== Target Comics ===
Metallurgist and U.S. spy Niles Reed created the identity of the Target, using a bulletproof costume with a bullseye on the chest, to save the life of his brother Bill, who had been wrongfully convicted of murder and sentenced to be executed. Bill was killed during the jailbreak, and Niles avenged himself on the gangsters responsible for Bill's conviction, after which he continued to fight evil as The Target.

Later, Niles' associates Dave Foster and Tom Brown, who had both been orphaned by criminals, became his wisecracking sidekicks The Targeteers. The three of them wore indestructible costumes that were identical except for the colors; one was mostly yellow, one red, one blue (who wore which wasn't always consistent, although The Target usually wore yellow).

The Target's foes include gang boss Hammerfist and the beautiful Princess Hohohue.

The characters all enlisted in the military to fight in World War II in Target Comics #29 (July 1942).

=== Project Superpowers ===
A few years after World War II, the Target and the Targeteers were trapped and imprisoned in the Urn of Pandora by the misguided Fighting Yank; decades later, the Urn was broken and they were freed. Imprisonment in the mystical Urn, however, had transformed them; they were now somehow bonded together and given superpowers, including super-speed.
