= Jack Frost (Marvel Comics) =

Marvel Comics fictional character

- Detail from cover of The Invaders #6 (May 1976). Art by Jack Kirby and Joe Sinnott.

Publication information
- Publisher: Marvel Comics
- First appearance: U.S.A. Comics #1 (August 1941)
- Created by: Stan Lee; Charles Wojtkoski

In-story information
- Alter ego: Isabrot
- Species: Ice Giant-Elder God hybrid
- Team affiliations: Liberty Legion
- Notable aliases: The God in the Ice
- Abilities: Cold and ice manipulation Superhuman stamina and durability

Jack Frost is a fictional superhero appearing in American comic books published by Marvel Comics. The character first appeared in 1941 in U.S.A. Comics published by Marvel's 1940s forerunner Timely Comics, during the period fans and historians call the Golden Age of comic books.

== Publication history ==
First appearing in U.S.A. Comics #1 (cover-dated August 1941) from Marvel predecessor Timely Comics, Jack Frost was one of the first creations of future Marvel editor-in-chief and publisher Stan Lee, who collaborated with penciler Charles Wojtkoski. Another of the Jack Frost stories was written by Carmine Infantino and drawn by Frank Giacoia. Attribution for the other stories has been debated. The character appeared in four issues (U.S.A. Comics #1-4), before he was swept aside by a more popular headliner, Captain America.

Jack Frost outwardly recalls the folklorish spirit of winter Jack Frost, with icy blue skin and blue shorts. His powers and appearance resemble Iceman, another Stan Lee creation who appeared twenty years later, in 1963's The X-Men.

Jack Frost's four stories were originally untitled, but comics historians refer to them as "The Origin of Jack Frost", "The Mechanical Octopus Pirates", "The Ambulance Racketeers" and "The Adventure of the Frozen Corpses".

In addition to the four comics stories in U.S.A. Comics, Jack also appeared in a two-page text feature written by Lee in issue #2, "When U.S.A. Heroes Meet!" In this story, there's a gathering at the home of Dan Kane (also known as the superhero Captain Terror) of that issue's heroes: Jack Frost, Rockman, the Whizzer, the Defender and the Vagabond. Jack makes friends with the other heroes, although at one point he does call them "a bunch of sissies". The group agrees to meet next issue and present the tale that they've decided is the best story of the month. The conceit was dropped, and the group did not reassemble in the next issue.

More than three decades after Jack Frost's final appearance, Marvel launched The Invaders in 1975, an intentionally nostalgic comic featuring star characters from the Golden Age — Captain America, Bucky Barnes, the Human Torch and the Sub-Mariner — in World War II-era adventures. Writer and editor Roy Thomas wanted to expand the franchise, so he created a second superteam — the Liberty Legion — with a group of second-string Golden Age heroes including Jack Frost, along with Miss America, the Whizzer, the Patriot, the Thin Man, Red Raven and the Blue Diamond.

Thomas said that he chose Jack Frost for the team because the character fit an archetype that Thomas was looking for: "I felt I should have a Sub-Mariner type and, in a way, Jack Frost kind of fit that bill", he said. He chose not to explore Jack's backstory, although there are indications that he may be an alien: "His background was vague in the original stories, so I wanted to keep it vague", said Thomas.

Jack fought with the Legion in five stories in 1976. The team was introduced in Marvel Premiere #29 and 30 (April and May 1976), as well as an issue of The Invaders and two issues of Marvel Two-in-One. The Liberty Legion returned for another four issues of The Invaders in 1978-1979, and then the team disappeared from the canvas. Thomas said that there were plans for a Liberty Legion series, but by that point, the sales figures on the Invaders comic were dropping, and Marvel decided against launching a spin-off.

Frost came back for one issue in April 1991 — Captain America #384, "Lair of the Ice Worm" — and then went back into hibernation. He made another two appearances in 2009, in the Golden Age nostalgia series Avengers/Invaders #10 and 12 (June & Aug 2009).

In a 2025 issue of the Scarlet Witch series, Jack Frost was finally rescued by the Scarlet Witch from within his ice worm prison.

== Fictional character biography ==
Jack Frost resembles a young man made of ice, and can create and withstand extremely cold temperatures and generate large amounts of ice.

The introduction in his first story implies that he is a mythical creature, a lonely figure existing in the Arctic landscape: "The far north! Challenging! Mysterious! Foreboding! The land that no man really knows... in this great, frozen waste, surrounded by an eternal, deathly quiet, lives a person we have all heard of but few men have seen — the King of the Cold — Jack Frost!"

This spirit was awoken by the cries of a dying prospector, who's been shot by a claim-jumper. In his final moments, the man pleads with Jack to protect his daughter in New York City, and Jack — horrified by the crime — transports himself to America to confer with the police. They do not believe his story, so he determines to fight evil wherever he can find it.

During World War II, he joined with other superheroes to form the team Liberty Legion and protect the United States from Axis home-front infiltration. The Liberty Legion was initially assembled by Bucky to rescue the Invaders brainwashed by the Red Skull. With the Legion, Jack Frost battled Namor the Sub-Mariner and the original Human Torch, and protected bystanders from shrapnel with an ice umbrella.

Jack Frost was seen again in a 1991 issue of Captain America, in which it was explained that he had sacrificed himself by melding with a powerful Arctic "ice-worm" monster, in order to neutralize it and keep it from savaging innocent people. Jack Frost was briefly freed during an encounter with Captain America, before willingly being swallowed by and joining with the ice-worm once more. Thor speculates that Jack Frost may be the diminutive child of a Norse mythology Frost giant. This was subsequently confirmed in Scarlet Witch vol.4 #8 (2025) wherein it is revealed he is the son of Buri and an ice giant.

== Powers and abilities ==
Jack Frost has the ability to generate sub-freezing temperatures. Combined with ambient water vapor, he can create snow, sleet, and ice for various effects such as propelling snow flurries at hurricane wind-speeds or fashioning ice into various simple constructs such as spheres, bridges, or walls. He also has superhuman stamina and durability. Jack Frost has bluish-white skin that glistens from the glaze of frost that covers it. His skin temperature is 32 °F (0 °C).

== Related characters ==
- In modern Marvel continuity, an unrelated, human scientist, Professor Gregor Shapanka, using technological means to generate incapacitating ice which he first planned to use to prolong life, became the supervillain Jack Frost in Tales of Suspense #45 (Sept 1963). He was introduced as an antagonist of the superhero Iron Man, as he was a former Stark employee who was fired for attempted robbery. He later took on the name Blizzard.
