= Blue Diamond (character) =

Marvel Comics Golden Age superhero

The Blue Diamond
- Panel from Marvel Premiere #30 (June 1976); Art by Don Heck and Vince Colletta

Publication information
- Publisher: Marvel Comics
- First appearance: Daring Mystery Comics #7 (April 1941)
- Created by: Ben Thompson

In-story information
- Alter ego: Elton T. Morrow
- Team affiliations: Liberty Legion; Crazy Sues; New Invaders
- Abilities: Superhuman strength Nigh-invulnerability; Diamond hard skin Flight; Slow aging Ability to survive the vacuum of space

Blue Diamond is a superhero appearing in American comic books published by Marvel Comics, debuting under the company's 1940s forerunner, Timely Comics. The character was created in 1941 by Ben Thompson, who also drew the first comic book adventures of Ka-Zar the Great and Citizen V for Timely, as well as the Masked Marvel for Centaur Publications and Dr. Frost for Prize Comics.

An unrelated supervillain called the Blue Diamond appears as an antagonist in Timely's The Human Torch #11 (Spring 1943).

== Publication history ==
The Blue Diamond first appeared in Daring Mystery Comics #7 (April 1941), published by Marvel's 1940s predecessor, Timely Comics, during the period fans and historians call the Golden Age of Comic Books. During that time, he appeared only in that issue and its subsequent, final issue, #8 (January 1942).

More than thirty years later, Marvel launched The Invaders in 1975, an intentionally nostalgic comic featuring star characters from the Golden Age — Captain America, Bucky Barnes, the Human Torch and the Sub-Mariner — in World War II-era adventures. Writer and editor Roy Thomas wanted to expand the franchise, so he created the Liberty Legion with a group of second-string Golden Age heroes, including the Blue Diamond, along with Miss America, the Whizzer, the Patriot, the Thin Man, Red Raven and Jack Frost.

In a 2018 interview, Thomas said, "I played around a little bit with the Blue Diamond. I made him bigger and stronger. In the original comics, he's just a guy about the same size as everyone else, and I bulked him up to make him a little more unique for that series."

The Blue Diamond fought with the Legion for five stories in 1976. The team was introduced in Marvel Premiere #29 and 30 (April and May 1976), as well as an issue of The Invaders and two issues of Marvel Two-in-One. The Liberty Legion returned for another four issues of The Invaders in 1978–1979, and then the team disappeared from the canvas. Thomas said that there were plans for a Liberty Legion series, but by that point, the sales figures on the Invaders comic were dropping, and Marvel decided against launching a spin-off. He returned in 1981 for a one-on-one team-up with the Thing in Marvel Two-in-One #79 (Sept 1981).

In the 2000s, the Blue Diamond returned in two issues of New Invaders (2004-2005), and Citizen V and V Battalion: The Everlasting #1 (March 2002). He also appears in flashbacks as a member of the Crazy Sues in All-Winners Squad: Band of Heroes (2011).

== Fictional character biography ==
Elton T. Morrow is an archaeologist who finds a mysterious blue diamond on an expedition to Antarctica. The diamond is a piece of the Lifestone Tree, which powers the alien Chosen Eight of Fate. A German sub attacks Morrow's ship on the way home and Morrow is the only survivor. An explosion shattered the diamond during the battle, forcing innumerable tiny diamond particles into Morrow's body. After he is rescued by a British ship, he finds that the shards of the diamond gave him diamond-hard skin, giving him superhuman strength and nigh-invulnerability. Dubbing himself the Blue Diamond, he battles Nazi spies during World War II as part of the Crazy Sues.

After spending years in retirement, the Blue Diamond returns to assist the Fantastic Four's Thing against Shanga the Star-Dancer, a crystal based alien. Shanga falls in love with Blue Diamond, and turns him into a living humanoid diamond creature as her consort. Morrow returns to Earth to join the new Invaders.

== Powers and abilities ==
The strange blue diamond particles embedded in Blue Diamond's body have made his skin as strong as a diamond, giving him superhuman strength and nigh-invulnerability. After his body was altered by Shanga, Blue Diamond gains the power of flight and the ability to survive in the vacuum of space. The alterations to his body also reversed the effects of aging.

== Reception ==
In Golden Age Daring Mystery Masterworks Vol. 2, journalist and comics writer Will Murray describes the Blue Diamond as "an obvious attempt to imbue some of Superman's strength and invulnerability to a lawsuit-proof character".
