= Miss America (Marvel Comics) =

Comic book superheroine

Miss America Ms. America
- Madeline Joyce / Miss America. Variant cover of Miss America Comics 70th Anniversary Special #1 (June 2009). Art by Marcos Martin.
- Publisher: Marvel Comics
- First appearance: Marvel Mystery Comics #49 (November 1943)
- Created by: Otto Binder (writer); Al Gabriele (art)
- Characters: List: Madeline Joyce Frank Erika Kelley America Chavez

Miss America

Series publication information
- Publisher: Marvel Comics
- Format: List: (vol 1) One-shot (vol 2–9) Ongoing series (vol 10) One-shot
- Publication date: List: (vol 1) May 1944 (one-shot) (vol 2) September 1944 – January 1945 (vol 3) February 1945 – July 1945 (vol 4) September 1945 – March 1946 (vol 5) April 1946 – September 1946 (vol 6) October 1946 – March 1947 (vol 7) April 1947 – June 1947 (vol 8) July 1947 – February 1952 (vol. 9) April 1952 – June 1958 (vol 10) June 2009 (one-shot)
- Number of issues: List: (vol 1): 1 (vol 2): 6 (vol 3): 6 (vol 4): 6 (vol 5): 6 (vol 6): 6 (vol 7): 3 (vol 8): 45 (vol 9): 48 (vol 10): 1
- Main character(s): List: (vol 1–2) Madeline Joyce (vol 2–9) Patsy Walker (vol 10) Madeline Joyce

Creative team
- Writer(s): List: (vol 1) Bill Finger Otto Binder (vol 10) Jen Van Meter Allen Bellman
- Penciller(s): List: (vol 1) Ken Bald (vol 10) Andy MacDonald Alan Mandel Allen Bellman
- Inker(s): List: (vol 1) George Klein (vol 10) Andy MacDonald Bob Oksner Allen Bellman
- Letterer(s): List: (vol 10) Dave Lanphear
- Colorist(s): List: (vol 10) Nick Filardi
- Editor(s): List: (vol 10) Stephen Wacker Tom Brennan Tom Brevoort Vincent Fago

Miss America (also spelt as Ms. America) is the name of several superheroines appearing in American comic books published by Marvel Comics. The first incarnation of Miss America, Madeline Joyce, first appeared in Marvel Mystery Comics #49 (November 1943). The second incarnation, Erika Kelley, debuted as Ms. America in Avengers: The Initiative Annual #1 (January 2008). The third incarnation, America Chavez, made her first appearance in Vengeance #1 (September 2011).

Since their original introductions in comics, characters using the Miss America codename have appeared in a range of Marvel-licensed media, including films, television series, video games, and merchandise.

== Development ==
=== Concept and creation ===
Comic book publishers tried to explore new types of stories, characters, and audiences, since superheroes began to fade out of fashion in the post-World War II era. Comic companies started introducing more female superheroes in an attempt to appeal to young female readers. American comic book publisher Timely Comics released Marvel Mystery Comics #49 (November 1943) featuring a new superheroine known as Miss America. According to American author Jess Nevins and his Encyclopedia of Golden Age Superheroes, Miss America "fights ordinary criminals, Axis agents, Baron Shinto the Gouger, the murderous teen the Cherub, King Cobra, and the human electric eel the Shocker."

=== Publication history ===
==== Miss America ====
Madeline Joyce received the Miss America Comics #1 (May 1944) one-shot, her first solo comic book. According to some sources, illustrator Ken Bald served as the cover and interior artist, although Vincent Fago, interim editor of Timely Comics for the drafted writer Stan Lee, asserted, "I hired a friend from the animation business, Pauline Loth, and she did the art for the first Miss America book." Fago also stated, "I hired her at Timely when she left Fleischer's and came to New York. She did "Miss America" for us and created her costume." Fago, speaking in an interview with Jim Amash, recalled that Miss America Comics played a key role in Timely Comics' subscription strategy during his tenure as editor. He explained that the comic included a subscription notice offering 12 issues for $1, and within a few weeks the company received $20,000 payments in response. Fago described placing the money among the artwork bins and noted that the resulting revenue allowed everyone working for him to earn a good income.

The Miss America Comics series changed its format with its second issue to become a larger magazine-sized Miss America Magazine, though with the conventional comic book combination of glossy covers and newsprint interior. Initiating this format as vol. 1 #2 (November 1944), the publication relegated its superhero to a secondary role and began focusing on teen-romance comics stories and articles on such topics as cooking, fashion, and makeup. This second issue, which featured a photo cover of an unknown model dressed in the Miss America costume, also introduced the long-running, teen-humor comics feature Patsy Walker.

The Miss America Magazine series was renamed Miss America starting with issue #46 (April 1952). Alongside the single superhero comic, Miss America ran 126 issues in a complicated numbering that continued through vol. 7 #50 (December 1952), the 83rd issue. It then reverted to comic book format as Miss America vol. 1 #51–93 (April 1953 – November 1958).

The magazine format used photo covers of everyday teens. In 1951, starting with vol. 7 #42, the logo changed to Patsy Walker Starring in Miss America, with covers now depicting high schooler, Patsy, boyfriend Buzz Baxter, and romantic-rival Hedy Wolfe, in cartoon art by artists Al Jaffee and Morris Weiss.

Madeline Joyce received the Miss America Comics 70th Anniversary Special #1 (June 2009) one shot, her second solo comic book. Diamond Comic Distributors reported that the issue was the 136th bestselling comic book in June 2009.

==== Other series ====
Madeline Joyce appeared as Miss America in several Marvel series, including All Winners Comics (1941), Blonde Phantom (1946), Giant-Size Avengers (1974), and X-Statix Presents: Dead Girl (2006). Erika Kelley appeared as Ms. America in Fear Itself: Youth in Revolt (2011).

== Fictional character biography ==
=== Madeline Joyce ===
The first Miss America is Madeline Joyce. Created by writer Otto Binder and artist Al Gabriele, the character first appeared in Marvel Mystery Comics #49 (November 1943).

Madeline Joyce Frank is a socially aware heiress born in Washington, D.C. who is the niece of the millionaire radio mogul James Bennet. She acquired a range of superpowers after being exposed to an electrical discharge from an unknown experimental piece of equipment. Joyce possesses the "Strength of a Thousand Men," allowing her to lift weights far heavier than a normal human would be capable of lifting. Her superhuman durability makes her resistant to different forms of damage. She has the ability to levitate herself through psionic means. By using her levitation ability in connection with carefully planned leaps, she is able to fly. She married fellow Golden Age superhero Robert Frank / Whizzer. Because the two had been exposed to radiation, their first child was the radioactive mutant Nuklo. Joyce died of complications stemming from childbirth with her second, stillborn child due to radiation poisoning from her first child.

=== Erika Kelley ===
The second Ms. America is Erika Kelley. Created by writers Dan Slott, Christos N. Gage, and artist Patrick Scherberger, the character debuted in Avengers: The Initiative Annual #1 (January 2008).

Erika Kelley was a member of the Liberteens under the codename of Ms. America. Madeline Joyce served here as an inspiration. She battled Flag-Smasher when he intended to destroy the Liberty Bell. Kelley subsequently left the team alongside her former teammates to found a new one called the Fantastix. She decided to abandon the mantle of Ms. America and took the codename of Ms. Fantastix.

=== America Chavez ===
The third Miss America is America Chavez. Created by writer Joe Casey and artist Nick Dragotta, the character was introduced in Vengeance #1 (September 2011).

Chavez was originally depicted as an extraterrestrial from the Utopian Parallel, a dimension outside of time and space. Her origin was later revised to establish that she was born on Earth to scientists who sought to cure her of a disease. The Utopian Parallel was reinterpreted as a medical facility where experimental procedures ultimately granted her superpowers.

== Supporting characters ==
=== Allies ===
List of allies appearing in comic books with Miss America as the protagonist
Name / alter ego	Creator(s)	First appearance	Description
James Bennett	Otto Binder, Alfred Gabriele	Marvel Mystery Comics #49 (November 1943)	James Bennett is the uncle of Madeline Joyce. He is a rich radio mogul who takes cares of his niece.
Robert Frank / Whizzer	Al Avison	USA Comics #1 (August 1941)	Robert Frank is the husband of Madeline Joyce. He is a speedster with superhuman strength.
Elton Morrow / Blue Diamond	Ben Thompson	Daring Mystery Comics #7 (February 1941)	Elton Morrow is a friend of Madeline Joyce. He is an archaeologist with superhuman strength and durability.
Kate Bishop / Hawkeye	Allan Heinberg, Jim Cheung	Young Avengers #1 (April 2005)	Kate Bishop is a friend of America Chavez. She is a skilled archer and swordswoman.
David Alleyne / Prodigy	Nunzio DeFilippis, Christina Weir, Keron Grant	New Mutants vol. 2 #4 (October 2003)	David Alleyne is a friend of America Chavez. He is a mutant genius with telepathic abilities that allow him to replicate the knowledge of those near him.

=== Enemies ===
List of enemies appearing in comic books with Miss America as the protagonist
Name / alter ego	Creator(s)	First appearance	Description
Stefan Halpern / Pinhead Killer	Charles Nicholas	Marvel Mystery Comics #52 (December 1943)	Stefan Halpern is a Nazi who battled Madeline Joyce.
Unknown / Flaming Hate	Charles Nicholas	Marvel Mystery Comics #53 (January 1944)	Flaming Hate is an antagonist of Madeline Joyce. He is a murderer who attacks firefighters to avenge the death of his wife.
Dalt Kendall / Shocker	Bill Finger, Pauline Loth	Miss America Magazine #2 (September 1944)	Dalt Kendall is an antagonist of Madeline Joyce. He is a scientist with an obsession with electric eels. He gained the power to generate electricity while experimenting with them. He used his superhuman abilities to rob banks and murder people.
Unknown / The Spiderman	Syd Shores	Blonde Phantom Comics #12 (December 1946)	The Spiderman is an antagonist of Madeline Joyce. He is a scientist who is obsessed with spiders. He possessed huge spiders who feed on human blood. He invented a web-shooting device to kidnap his victims.
Oubliette Midas / Exterminatrix	Grant Morrison – J.G. Jones	Marvel Boy vol. 2 #1 (June 2000)	Oubliette Midas is an antagonist of America Chavez. She is the leader of the supervillain organization known as the Midas Foundation.
Guy Thierrault / Flag-Smasher	Zeb Wells – Stefano Caselli	Civil War: Young Avengers and Runaways #1 (July 2006)	Guy Thierrault is an antagonist of Erika Kelley. He is an anti-nationalist who terrorizes the population to spread his views.

== Impact ==
- Madeline Joyce became one of the first female costumed heroes introduced in comic books in 1943. The character was the third female comic book female hero to get her own solo book in 1944, after DC Comics' Wonder Woman and Fiction House's Sheena, Queen of the Jungle.
- America Chavez has been the subject of comparisons with some characters in the comic book industry regarding her representation and abilities. In 2016, she was compared to the protagonist of a one-shot in development by writer Joe Casey (who created Chavez) and artist Dustin Nguyen for Image Comics, inspiring discussions among journalists about her influence on the new character. Several critics noted that Chavez served as an inspiration for the comic book publisher's latest protagonist, highlighting their similarities. This connection was further emphasized in subsequent years, particularly with the release of All-America Comix #1 (July 2020), where additional journalists asserted that Chavez inspired Casey and Nguyen for the creation of Image Comics' new character. Years later, in 2023, several critics noted similarities between the newly acquired superpowers of DC Comics' character Power Girl and those of Chavez.
  - The representation of the character has led to notable achievements and recognition. In 2017, Chavez was featured as the titular character in her own comic book series, America (2017–2018). She made history as the first Latin-AmericanLGBT character in Marvel Comics to star in a solo comic book series as the eponymous character. In 2018, Supreme Court Justice Sonia Sotomayor wrote to America series writer Gabby Rivera, acknowledging the significance of the character. She stated, "You have created a powerful female character in the production of America, and I know you will forever inspire many individuals by continuing to invent America Chavez's story. Indeed, it is important to remind readers to take time to honor themselves and embrace their differences as strengths." Several journalists have also identified the character as the first Latin-American LGBT superhero to star in the Marvel Cinematic Universe (MCU) media franchise.
  - Chavez has generated significant public interest. She notably garnered media attention in March 2018 when American actress Gina Rodriguez expressed her enthusiasm to audition for the role of Chavez, declaring herself a fan of the character. This interest was echoed in May by Argentine-American actress Stephanie Beatriz, who also shared her desire to portray Chavez on Twitter. Chavez further captured the public's attention in October 2018 when Beatriz dressed up as Chavez for Halloween, generating significant media coverage. In September 2022, Chavez placed third in a popularity contest held by Multiversity Comics, where readers elected their "Favorite Latin American Superhero."
  - The character has been referenced in other media as well. In 2022, the comic book America Chavez: Made in the USA #1 (March 3, 2021) appeared as an easter egg in a display case in the final episode of the miniseries She-Hulk: Attorney at Law.
  - Chavez won Favorite Queer Character at the 2014 Autostraddle Comic and Sequential Art Awards. In 2018, the America series was nominated for Outstanding Comic Book at the 29th GLAAD Media Awards. Chavez was also nominated for Best First Appearance at the 2022 Golden Issue Awards.

== Other versions ==
An alternate version of Miss America, with elements of DC Comics character Liberty Belle, appears in the Amalgam Comics universe. This version is known as Madeline Lawrence / American Belle. She is a member of the All-Star Winners Squadron.
