= Thin Man (character) =

Fictional superhero in Marvel Comics

Publication information
- Publisher: Marvel Comics
- First appearance: Mystic Comics #4, June 1940
- Created by: Unknown writer Klaus Nordling (artist)

In-story information
- Alter ego: Bruce Dickson
- Team affiliations: Invaders; Liberty Legion; New Invaders
- Abilities: Accomplished airplane pilot Elasticity; Shapeshifting; Intense superhuman water pressure resistance Eternal youth Immunity to all known diseases Advanced knowledge of Kalahian science and technology Ability to become nearly two-dimensional

The Thin Man is a superhero appearing in American comic books published by Marvel Comics. The character was created by artist Klaus Nordling and an unknown writer in Mystic Comics #4 (August 1940), and published by Marvel predecessor Timely Comics during the time fans and historians call the Golden Age of Comic Books. The Thin Man was one of the first "stretching" superheroes, predating Quality Comics's more famous Plastic Man by more than a year and DC Comics's Elongated Man and Marvel Comics's Mister Fantastic by more than twenty years.

== Publication history ==
In his origin story, explorer Bruce Dickson climbs Mount Kalpurthia in Tibet, and finds the lost city of Kalahia, where everyone can turn themselves super-thin at will. He learns their secrets, and leaves the valley to fight crime in America, with Olalla, a pretty Kalahian girl, at his side. Using his special skill, he can slip under doors and surprise criminals. He made no further Golden Age appearances following his debut.

The Thin Man next appeared in 1970s comics in World War II flashback stories, beginning with Marvel Premiere #29 (April 1976). This story, by writer Roy Thomas and penciller Don Heck, retcons the Thin Man as a founding member of the superhero team the Liberty Legion. His costume was changed in this revival from blue and red to green and yellow, because the red and blue ensemble looked too much like other, better-known members of the superteam. The team made a handful of appearances in 1976 and 1979.

The Thin Man was revived in 1993 for a brief Invaders series, and then co-starred in the 2004–2005 series The New Invaders.

== Fictional character biography ==
In the 1930s, scientist and explorer Dr. Bruce Dickson attempts to climb Mount Kalpurthia in the Himalayas. There, he encounters the lost civilization of Kalahia, which possessed extremely advanced technology. The Kalahian people expose him to a mutagenic substance which alters his body to give him the same physical abilities as they had: eternal youth, and tremendous physical resilience and flexibility, including the ability to become "thin", or rather, flat.

Dickson learns much of their advanced technology, and falls in love with Olalla, daughter of the Kalahians' leader. The Thin Man, which Dickson has adopted as his superhero name, becomes a member of the stateside team the Liberty Legion during World War II. The Liberty Legion begins battling Nazi agents in the United States. With the Liberty Legion, the Thin Man the Invaders, who are hypnotically controlled by the Red Skull. In 1942, the Liberty Legion encounters the Thing who has traveled back in time, and they aid them in battling Master Man, U-Man, and Skyshark. The Liberty Legion also battled Iron Cross.

At some point, the Thin Man reveals to Captain America that Olalla, whom he has married, has returned to Kalahia. The Thin Man remains in order to serve his country, and when he returns to Kalahia after the war he finds that the Nazis have located the valley and slaughtered all its inhabitants, including his wife. After this, he becomes an obsessed Nazi hunter for decades, eventually discovering that an old foe, the Nazi's Agent Axis, was responsible for Kalahia's destruction. With assistance from Captain America, he tracks down and confronts Agent Axis. The war criminal brags that since he had been brought to America under Operation Paperclip, he cannot be prosecuted for his wartime activities. The Thin Man becomes so outraged that he wraps his pliable body around Agent Axis and snaps his neck. Shocked, Captain America immediately brings him to the authorities for murder.

He eventually is pardoned so that the U.S. government can obtain his knowledge of advanced Kalahian technology. He is made a member of the New Invaders, and begins to contribute his knowledge to the group. Unfortunately, the entire operation was actually a ruse by the ex-Nazi villain the Red Skull, who has disguised himself as the Secretary of Defense. Once this deception is revealed, Dickson forges ahead with the plan to create a new Invaders unit armed with Kahalian technology, specifically to thwart the Red Skull and his organization, the Axis Mundi. Dickson designs the battleship Infiltrator, which can travel through multi-dimensional space, effectively allowing it to teleport long distances; the Infiltrator is sacrificed when it is rammed into a doomsday weapon in order to protect the Earth from another World War II-era supervillain, U-Man.

== Powers and abilities ==
Bruce Dickson has been genetically modified through a scientific process developed by the people of Kahalia, to be able to convert the mass of his entire body into a highly malleable state at will, enabling him to stretch, deform, expand, or compress all or any part of his body into any shape. His costume is made of an unknown Kahalian fabric that stretches and contracts in size as he does. He most often uses his power to elongate portions of his body to the thinness of an average sheet of typing paper, enabling him to pass under a shut door. The limits on the Thin Man's powers are unknown. He can absorb the impact of a projectile shot at him or of any concussive force, within certain unknown limits, by deforming his body. When underwater he can resist intense water pressure to a superhuman extent for a period of minutes. He can become nearly two-dimensional, while his limbs can effectively become blades in the process.

He does not age and is seemingly immune to all known diseases. The Thin Man has tremendous knowledge of the advanced sciences and technology of Kalahia, but only what he could memorize or take with him.

The Thin Man is a good hand-to-hand combatant who has received coaching from the Patriot and Miss America. He is also an accomplished airplane pilot.
