= All-New Invaders =

Marvel comic book series

Publication information
- Publisher: Marvel Comics
- Schedule: Monthly
- Format: Ongoing series
- Genre: Superhero
- Publication date: January 2014 – April 2015
- Main character(s): Captain America (Sam Wilson); Namor; Winter Soldier; Human Torch

Creative team
- Created by: James Robinson; Steve Pugh
- Written by: James Robinson
- Artist(s): Steve Pugh; Mukesh Singh (cover artist)

All-New Invaders was a reboot of the classic comic book series Invaders.

== Publication history ==
The series was published by Marvel Comics between 2014–15. It was created by James Robinson, Mukesh Singh and Steve Pugh. It featured many of the original Invaders but also a Japanese heroine named Radiance (the granddaughter of Golden Girl), who joined the team during the book's second arc, and Iron Cross's daughter, who joined in issue #10. With issues 6 and 7, the series tied in with the Original Sin storyline. The series also has many references to classic comic characters and teams, such as Kid Commandos, Freedom's Five and Killraven. In issues 14 & 15, Sam Wilson (Falcon) replaces Steve Rogers on the team. The series was canceled after 15 issues.

== Plot ==
The Kree empire intends to conquer the universe using a weapon called the God's Whisper that will allow them to control any god-like creature. The Supreme Intelligence sends Tanalth, the new leader of the Pursuer Corps, to Earth to capture Jim Hammond (the original Human Torch) and Namor to unlock the power of the God's Whisper. Hammond had faked his death and is living as a mechanic in a small rural Illinois town. Tanalth destroys the town looking for Hammond, until Captain America and Winter Soldier come to help and drive Tanalth away. It was later revealed that, during World War II, the Invaders faced off against Hela, who was being controlled by the Nazis who were using the God's Whisper. After the Invaders win the battle, they agree to break the weapon into five pieces and not share the locations with each other, then wipe their memories of the events. The Kree found the locations and then kidnapped Namor. The Invaders recruit Aarkus (the original Vision), then travel to Kree to save him but are quickly captured. The Supreme Intelligence has no need for Bucky, so he has him killed. Aarkus is also captured and experimented on. The Supreme Intelligence needs Hammond, Namor and Captain America to test the might of the God's Whisper, which is controlling the Eternal Ikaris. Ikaris is powerless and is forced to fight the three. But unbeknownst to the Kree, Bucky faked his death and skulked away to free Aarkus, while everyone was distracted watching the fight between the three Invaders and Ikaris. As it turns out, Captain America had planned the capture of the team all along in order to get close enough to plant a virus into the Kree Supreme Intelligence, who then, because of the virus, allows the Invaders and their friends to leave. Ikaris leaves with Aarkus and takes the God's Whisper with him. Captain America convinces Hammond to come out of hiding and join S.H.I.E.L.D. Namor quips that this was the most fun he has had in a long time and suggests they team up again.

Hammond's first mission as a S.H.I.E.L.D. agent is to quell a hostage situation caused by the original Invaders. Radiance, the granddaughter of Golden Girl, attacked a S.H.I.E.L.D. base because she wanted to know why the Invaders allowed the atom bombs to be dropped on Japan. Hammond explained that they were busy preventing the military from using a Tsunami Bomb, which would have created more collateral damage. He even tells how Golden Girl led the Kid Commandos against the Invaders. In a panic, Radiance detonates a light bomb, but Hammond takes the blame for it since Radiance is continuing to honor her grandmother's legacy as a super hero.

During the debriefing of the hostage situation, Hammond is attacked by a Deathlok. Hammond, Namor and Bucky track down arms dealer Kurt Dagmar, who has an army of Deathloks at his command because of a special hacking device he has used. During this time, Bucky finds an Inhuman named Clare Gruler, the daughter of the Iron Cross, who was fused with her father's armor when her Inhuman powers manifested. She is grateful to Namor, who cleared her father's name of any war crimes during the Nuremberg Trials. Unfortunately, Hammond is struck by an AI scrambling beam and flies away in a mad rage. The team tracks him down and urges him to find his humanity and that he has a team that loves him. Hammond flies up into the stratosphere to reboot his hard drive, which had worked before, but he lost his powers and died. Namor promises to follow him and catch him this time.

In a flashback story, Union Jack, Spitfire, and Destroyer read about when the Freedom's Five — Phantom Eagle, Sir Steel, Union Jack, Crimson Cavalier and Iron Fist—battled aliens similar to those in The War of the Worlds. They enlist the help of Killraven to battles the aliens.

Toro is eventually freed from his Inhuman cocoon, so the Invaders go to Germany to assist Iron Cross in battling Neo-Nazis. They are interrupted by the Inhuman Lash, who is attempting to recruit Iron Cross, Toro, and the Neo-Nazis leader, who had no idea he was an Inhuman. Medusa and the Inhuman Royal Court appear, so Lash leaves with the Neo-Nazi, who abandons the Nazi cause since he does not have pure Aryan blood. Toro agrees to join the Inhumans in Attilan and the rest of the Invaders agree to return to their home countries. Hammond then returns to Camp Hammond and adopts Speedball's cat, Niels.

== Collected editions ==
Title	Material collected	Year	ISBN
All-New Invaders Vol. 1: Gods and Soldiers	All-New Invaders #1-5 and material from All-New Marvel Now Point One #1	August 2014	978-0785189145
All-New Invaders Vol. 2: Original Sin	All-New Invaders #6-10	December 2014	978-0785189152
All-New Invaders Vol. 3: The Martians are Coming	All-New Invaders #11-15	June 2015	978-0785192473
