= Daring Mystery Comics =

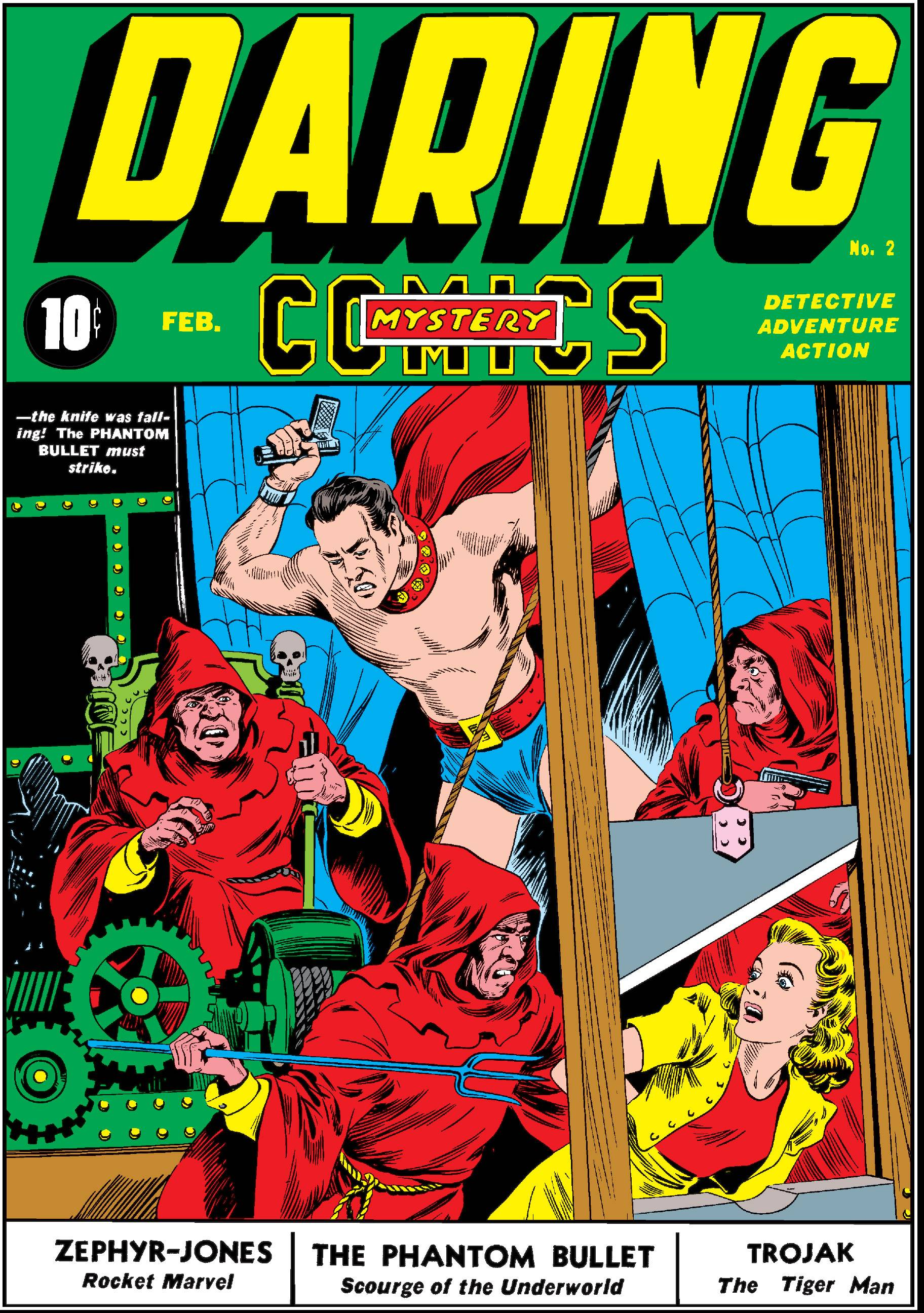
- Cover of Daring Mystery Comics #2 (Feb. 1940), art by Alex Schomburg

Publication information
- Publisher: Timely Comics
- Schedule: Varied (nominally monthly or bimonthly)
- Format: Ongoing series
- Publication date: January 1940 – January 1942
- No. of issues: 8

Creative team
- Written by: Joe Simon, Bill Everett, Jack Kirby
- Artist(s): Carl Burgos, Bill Everett, Alex Schomburg, Joe Simon, Jack Kirby
- Editor(s): Martin Goodman, Joe Simon

Daring Mystery Comics is an American comic-book series published by Timely Comics, a predecessor of Marvel Comics, during the 1930–40s period fans and historians call the Golden Age of Comic Books. Primarily a superhero anthology, it ran eight issues from 1940 to 1942, and is notable for work by Carl Burgos, Bill Everett, Alex Schomburg, and the team of Joe Simon & Jack Kirby.

Daring Mystery Comics #8 (Jan. 1942) features the first appearance of the Golden Age superhero Citizen V, who decades later appears in flashback in the Marvel series Thunderbolts, where his family and the Citizen V identity play a major part. A small handful of other Daring Mystery superheroes have been revived or have made guest appearances in modern-day titles, such as the World War II-set flashback series The Invaders and the feature "Liberty Legion" in Marvel Premiere.

== Publication history ==
Daring Mystery Comics came from publisher Martin Goodman's Timely Comics, which by the early 1960s would evolve into Marvel Comics. The first five issues were nominally edited by Goodman, but were in fact mixtures of material bought from Funnies, Inc. or the Harry "A" Chesler studio, both prominent comic-book "packagers" who produced stories or even complete, outsourced comics on demand for publishers entering the fledgling medium. Timely's first in-house editor, Joe Simon, relaunched the series with issue #6 as his second project for Goodman and remained for the last few issues.

Following Daring Mystery Comics #1-8 (Jan. 1940 - Jan. 1942) and a publishing hiatus, the series' numbering continued under different titles. In a quirk of publishing involving U.S. Postal Service regulations and mailing costs, and a World War II, paper-supply-related moratorium on launching new series, publisher Goodman somehow continued the series numbering as both Daring Comics for four issues from 1944 to 1945, and as Comedy Comics for 26 issues from 1942-1946, both of which launched with an issue #9.

== Characters ==
Daring Mystery Comics #8 (Jan. 1942). Left to right: Captain Daring, the Fin, the Thunderer, Citizen V, the Blue Diamond, and (inset) the Silver Scorpion. Cover art by Jack Kirby & Joe Simon.

An anthology with no regular star, the series included a number of obscure, mostly single-appearance features. Due to Golden Age comics work often going unsigned, comprehensive credits are difficult if not impossible to ascertain, and in many early cases, a feature's artist is also the uncredited writer.

The best known superheroes to debut in its pages were the Blue Diamond, by artist co-creator Ben Thompson; writer-artist Bill Everett's the Fin; and the Thunderer, created by writer John H. Compton and notable for artist co-creator Carl Burgos. All three heroes were introduced in issue #7 (April 1941).

In the 1970s, the Blue Diamond resurfaced in period stories in Marvel Premiere, as a member of the homefront World War II team the Liberty Legion. He also appeared in writer Paul Jenkins' 2011 miniseries All-Winners Squad: Band of Heroes (2011). Two characters introduced here, writer-artist Joe Simon's Fiery Mask, and writer Will Harr and artist Maurice Gutwirth's Laughing Mask, who became the Purple Mask, appeared in present-day stories after awakening from suspended animation alongside 10 other Timely heroes in Marvel Comics' 2007-2008 and 2012 miniseries The Twelve.

Other heroes included the Challenger, drawn by Charles Nicholas Wojtkoski under the pseudonym Nick Karlton; Dynaman, by artist and possibly writer Steve Dahlman; and the superheroine the Silver Scorpion, created or co-created by artist and sometime-writer Harry Sahle using the pen name Jewell, which comics historian Michael J. Vassallo believes marked a collaboration with another, unknown artist.

Daring Mystery Comics #6 (Sept. 1940), debut of the first 1940s Marvel Boy. Cover art by Jack Kirby & Joe Simon

The final three issues contained work by the commercially popular team of writer-inker Joe Simon and penciler and sometimes co-scripter Jack Kirby. They collaborated on the covers of #6 (July 1940) and #8 (Jan. 1942), the former of which also featured a 10-page Simon & Kirby story introducing the single-appearance superhero Marvel Boy (the first of several Marvel Universe characters to take that name), and 10-page story starring the previously introduced Fiery Mask. Issue #7 (April 1941) contained an eight-page Simon & Kirby story introducing the obscure Captain Daring (taken over for the next and last issue by artist Frank Borth, and continuing as Captain Dash in Comedy Comics #9). One of the first superhero parodies — Stuporman, by Harry Douglas who signed his name "Harry / Douglas" leading to much confusion and many theories over the possibility of two creators — debuted in issue #6 (Sept. 1940).

Non-superhero features included "G-Man, Don Gorman", a single-issue cover character by unknown creators, though inked by future notable Dick Briefer; "Soldier of Fortune, John Steele" and "Monako the Master Magician" a.k.a. "Monako, Prince of Magic", both by artist co-creator Larry Antonette (under the pseudonym Dean Carr for "John Steele"); "K-4 and the Sky Devils", by uncertain creators; "Whirlwind Carter of the Interplanetary Secret Service", by writer-artist Fletcher Hanks; the jungle-lord adventure "Trojak the Tiger Man", by artist co-creator Joe Simon using the byline Gregory Sykes; artist co-creator Ben Thompson's single-appearance Western "Robin Hood of the Range", featuring the first of two Marvel characters called the Texas Kid; and the college football-set Flash Foster at Midwestern, by writer and artist Bob Wood.

The comic's first five covers were by artist Alex Schomburg.

=== Complete list of features ===
- The Fiery Mask (January 1940; June 1940; September 1940)
- John Steele, Soldier of Fortune (January 1940) [final]
- The Texas Kid (January 1940) [final]
- Monako, Prince of Magic (January 1940; May 1940-September 1940) [final]
- Flash Foster at Midwestern (January 1940) [final]
- Doyl Denton, Phantom of the Underworld (January 1940) [final]
- Barney Mullen – Sea Rover (January 1940) [final]
- Zephyr Jones and His Rocket Ship (February 1940)
- The Phantom Bullet, Scourge of the Underworld (February 1940) [final]
- Trojak, the Tiger-Man (February 1940-June 1940) [final]
- K-4 and His Sky Devils (February 1940-June 1940) [final]
- Mr. E. (February 1940) [final]
- The Laughing Mask/The Purple Mask (February 1940-May 1940) [final]
- Dale of the FBI (April 1940) [final]
- Breeze Barton (April 1940-June 1940) [final]
- The Phantom Reporter (April 1940) [final]
- Marvex the Super Robot (April 1940-June 1940) [final]
- Captain Strong of the Foreign Legion (April 1940) [final]
- Whirlwind Carter of the Interplanetary Secret Service (May 1940-June 1940) [final]
- G-Man Don Gorman (May 1940) [final]
- Little Hercules (June 1940) [final]
- The Falcon (June 1940-September 1940) [final]
- Marvel Boy (September 1940) [final]
- Stuporman (September 1940)
- The Flying Flame (September 1940)
- Dynaman (September 1940) [final]
- Tigerman (September 1940) [final]
- The Thunderer (April 1941; January 1942) [final; revamped as Black Avenger]
- The Fin (April 1941; January 1942)
- Blue Diamond (April 1941; January 1942) [final]
- Officer O’Krime (April 1941; January 1942)
- The Silver Scorpion (April 1941; January 1942)
- The Challenger (April 1941)
- Mr. Million (April 1941) [final]
- Captain Daring (April 1941; January 1942) [final; revamped as Captain Dash]
- Citizen V (January 1942)
- The Li’l Professor and the Robot (January 1942)
- Tubby an’ Tack (January 1942)

== Collected editions ==
- Marvel Masterworks: Golden Age Daring Mystery Vol. 1 (collects Daring Mystery Comics #1-4)
- Marvel Masterworks: Golden Age Daring Mystery Vol. 2 (collects Daring Mystery Comics #5-8)

== In other media ==
The Thunderer appeared in the "Six Forgotten Warriors" episode of one of the Spider-Man animated television series.
