= Liberty Legion =

Marvel Comics superhero team

- Marvel Premiere #29 (April 1976). Cover art by Jack Kirby & Frank Giacoia.

Publication information
- Publisher: Marvel Comics
- First appearance: Marvel Premiere #29 (April 1976)
- Created by: Roy Thomas

In-story information
- Base(s): United States
- Member(s): Blue Diamond; Bucky; Jack Frost; Miss America; Patriot; Red Raven; Thin Man; Whizzer

The Liberty Legion is a superhero team appearing in American comic books published by Marvel Comics. The team was first created in 1976 and set during World War II. Composed of existing heroes from Marvel's 1940s Golden Age of Comic Books predecessor, Timely Comics, the team was assembled and named by writer Roy Thomas in a story arc running through The Invaders #5–6 (March & May 1976) and Marvel Premiere #29–30 (April & June 1976). Inspired by the Liberty Legion, a second fictional team called the Liberteens was published in 2007 as part of the Avengers Initiative.

== Publication history ==
The genesis of the Marvel Comics superhero team the Liberty Legion came in the 1970s' World War II-set The Invaders, starring a team composed of Captain America, the Sub-Mariner, and the original Human Torch, plus sidekicks Bucky and Toro, all characters that had appeared in Marvel's 1940s predecessor, Timely Comics. The Invaders #5 (cover-dated March 1976) featured cameo appearances by fellow Timely characters Miss America, Patriot, and Whizzer, who would go on to the Liberty Legion, and Fin, who would not. The team was formally assembled and named the following month in Marvel Premiere #29 (April 1976), with additional Timely superheroes Blue Diamond, Jack Frost, Red Raven, and Thin Man joining. The team went on to star in two more installments of this four-story arc, in The Invaders #6 and Marvel Premiere #30 (June 1976), all written by Roy Thomas and illustrated by various artists.

A new, unrelated version of the Liberty Legion, known as the Liberteens, based in modern-day Pennsylvania, debuted in Avengers: The Initiative Annual #1 (2008).

== Fictional team histories ==
"America's Homefront Heroes of World War II", the Liberty Legion differed from the Invaders by confronting Axis plots and influence in and around the United States as well as fifth columnists, rather than in the overseas theaters of war. It also differed by consisting of mostly obscure Timely Comics superheroes, rather than stars Captain America, the Sub-Mariner, and the original Human Torch, and their sidekicks. The Liberty Legion included only two of even the company's secondary tier – the Whizzer and Miss America, who in late-1940s comics were members of Timely's first super-team, the All-Winners Squad.

In the team's modern-day retcon origin, the Liberty Legion was assembled in 1942 by Captain America sidekick Bucky, the only Invaders member to escape a brainwashing trap by the Red Skull. To rescue his teammates, he gathered:

- Blue Diamond (introduced in Daring Mystery Comics #7, April 1941)
- Jack Frost (U.S.A. Comics #1, Aug. 1941)
- Miss America (Marvel Mystery Comics #49, Nov. 1943)
- Patriot (Human Torch Comics #3, Spring 1941)
- Red Raven (Red Raven Comics #1, Aug. 1940)
- Thin Man (Mystic Comics #4, July 1940)
- Whizzer (USA Comics #1, Aug. 1941)

Blue Diamond (a super-strong, superhumanly durable anthropologist), Jack Frost (the mythological spirit of winter), and the Thin Man (comics' first stretching hero, predating Plastic Man by just over a year) were here reintroduced into Marvel continuity, appearing for the first time since the Golden Age. Unofficial team leader the Patriot had appeared as a simulacrum projected from the mind of Rick Jones in The Avengers #97 (March 1972), but was otherwise reintroduced here. The winged Red Raven, who had starred in the single issue of a namesake title in 1940, had re-entered the modern Marvel universe with The X-Men #44 (May 1968). The Whizzer had returned as an older character in Giant-Size Avengers #1 (Aug. 1974), relating how he and the since-deceased Miss America had married each other years before.

== Liberteens ==
Liberteens
- The Liberteens. Art by Patrick Scherberger.

Publication information
- Publisher: Marvel Comics
- First appearance: Avengers: The Initiative Annual #1

In-story information
- Base(s): Pennsylvania, United States
- Member(s): The Blue Eagle; Hope; The Iceberg; Ms. America; The Revolutionary; The Whiz Kid; 2-D

The Liberteens, whose name is a homophone of "libertine", is a young group of superhumans inspired by the Liberty Legion and formed as part of the Fifty State Initiative of government-sanctioned superhero teams. The group is first seen as the Pennsylvania-based Initiative team.

The team consists of:

- Revolutionary: A swordsman who is inspired by the Patriot, and is the leader of the Liberteens. He was briefly replaced by a Skrull.
- Blue Eagle: He is inspired by the Red Raven, and possesses artificial blue wings that grand him flight. He also wears goggles to protect his eyes from high velocities and carries two handguns.
- Hope: Inspired by the Blue Diamond, Hope has a diamond body that grants her super-strength, enhanced durability, speed, stamina, and agility, invulnerability, indestructibility, flight, and space vacuum adaption. However, she does have a weak point similar to diamonds.
- Iceberg: Inspired by Jack Frost, his icy body provides him with super-strength and enhanced durability.
- Ms. America: Inspired by Miss America, she has superhuman strength, speed, stamina, agility, durability, reflexes, and high-speed flight.
- Whiz Kid: She was inspired by the Whizzer. The character had previously appeared as the super-speedster courier for the law firm Goodman, Lieber, Kurtzberg & Holliway in She-Hulk (vol. 2).
- 2-D: Inspired by the Thin Man, he has a flat, malleable body.

In public, the Liberteens use "liberty"- and "America"-based puns. In private, the group is shown celebrating victory with debauchery, with the exception of the seemingly straitlaced leader, the Revolutionary, who is revealed to be a Skrull sleeper agent involved in preparations for that shape-shifting alien race's Secret Invasion. During the invasion, upon the beginning of overt hostilities, a loosely organized band of Initiative members, including the Liberteens, join forces with the Skrull Kill Krew to identify and defeat the Skrulls within their own ranks, the Revolutionary among them. Afterward, the Whiz Kid saves her fellow Initiative members from the Skrulls' poisonous gas, before succumbing to it herself.

During the "Fear Itself" storyline, representative of the Liberteens are called by Prodigy when the Initiative is restarted and briefed on the hammers that the Serpent summoned to Earth.

Ms. America, 2-D, Hope, and the Iceberg later leave the Liberteens and come together as the Fantastix after the Fantastic Four disbanded following the Secret Wars storyline. While Ms. America took up the name of Ms. Fantastix, they also gained ownership of the Baxter Building. The Fantastix' first mission sees them thwarting the Wrecking Crew's jewelry store robbery. When the Fantastic Four return, they revealed that the Wrecking Crew's robbery was staged by their manager/publicist Brenda Bannicheck as part of a plan to boost their popularity. The Fantastix got the Fantastic Four's blessing to continue using the Baxter Building.

== See also ==
- Crusaders (Marvel Comics)
