= Red Raven (Marvel Comics) =

Red Raven is the name of three separate fictional characters appearing in American comic books published by Marvel Comics. These characters are the original Red Raven, a flying superhero, who appeared in print once in 1940, then not again until 1968, and occasionally since then; the second Red Raven, named Dania, who is a flying superhero and daughter of the original Red Raven, who first appeared in print in 1992, and occasionally since then; and Redford Raven, a Wild West villain who owned a set of medicine-enchanted wings, was also called Red Raven, and has appeared in print three times, in 1964, 1985, and 1987.

== Publication history ==
The first Red Raven, created by writer Joe Simon and artist Louis Cazeneuve, first appeared in Red Raven Comics #1 (cover-dated Aug. 1940), published by Marvel's predecessor, Timely Comics, during the Golden Age of Comic Books. The title was canceled after its premiere issue. When the unnamed character was a baby, his parents were killed when an airplane flew through a cloud and ran into the airborne island of the Bird People. The birds raised him as their own, and gave him artificial wings.

The character remained unused for more than two decades before returning as an antagonist in the story "Red Raven, Red Raven" in X-Men #44 (May 1968). The Red Raven then battled Namor, the Sub-Mariner in Sub-Mariner #26 (June 1970). In Marvel Premiere #29 (April 1976), Red Raven was shown to have been a member of the stateside World War II-era superhero team the Liberty Legion. In that capacity he and his teammates guest-starred in Marvel Two-In-One Annual #1 (1976) and The Invaders #6 (May 1976). He appeared in flashback cameos in Thor Annual #12 (1984) and Fantastic Four #405 (Oct. 1995). Although presumed dead for years, he eventually returned in Nova vol. 3 #4-5 (Aug.-Sept. 1999), and guest-starred in The Defenders #6-7 (Aug. - Sept. 2001) and The Order #2 (May 2002).

Dania first appeared in Marvel Super-Heroes #8 (January, 1992) and was created by Scott Lobdell and Chris Wozniak. She has also appeared in Nova vol. 3 #7, The Defenders vol. 2 #6, and New Invaders #2, and is mentioned in Civil War: Battle Damage Report. The character appears briefly in Avengers Arena, but is killed in the second issue.

Redford Raven appeared in Rawhide Kid #38 (February 1964), and West Coast Avengers Volume 2 #18 (March 1987). He also appeared in a dream sequence in Rawhide Kid vol. 2 (four-issue limited edition) #4 (November, 1985).

== Fictional character biography ==
=== Original Red Raven ===
Red Raven

Publication information
- Publisher: Marvel Comics
- First appearance: Red Raven Comics #1 (Aug. 1940)
- Created by: Joe Simon (Writer); Louis Cazeneuve (Artist)

In-story information
- Team affiliations: Liberty Legion
- Abilities: Flight using mechanical wings Access to alien technology Skilled hand-to-hand combatant

Sky-Island, also known as Aerie, is an "island" which floats in the sky above the Atlantic Ocean, inhabited by the Bird-People or Winged Ones, an avian offshoot of the human-alien hybrid race known as the Inhumans, who had long ago left the hidden Inhuman city Attilan and built their own abode. The island is kept aloft by antigravity drives and hidden from human civilization by artificial clouds.

An airplane crashes into the Sky-Island, killing all passengers except a small boy. The Bird-People raise the boy, equip them with a uniform outfitted with anti-gravitons for flight and artificial wings for navigation, and return him to human society as Red Raven.

In 1942, Bucky Barnes forms the Liberty Legion with Red Raven and other superheroes, battling foes such as the Red Skull. The Liberty Legion disbands in 1945. Red Raven travels to Europe, where he is one of many superheroes involved in the capture of Berlin.

Disillusioned by war, Red Raven returns to Sky-Island, where he discovers that the Bird-People plan to conquer human civilization. Red Raven foils their plot by using gas to place the tribe, including himself, in suspended animation. Sky-Island sinks to the bottom of the ocean, where it will resurface and reawaken the Bird-People after several years. When the island resurfaces near the end of the suspended-animation cycle, Angel stumbles upon the island and encounters Red Raven. Angel believes that it would be more humane to revive the Bird-People, but Red Raven disagrees. He sinks the island once more to protect the secret of the Bird-People, continuing the suspended animation process, and sets Angel adrift on a raft.

Sometime later, following an undersea earthquake, Red Raven's suspended-animation capsule breaks loose and floats to the surface, where Red Raven is found by his old wartime ally Namor. The imperfect suspended-animation technology that he had used, however, had driven Red Raven insane. He tries to awaken the Bird-People to join their crusade against humanity, but is thwarted by Namor. His condition worsens when he discovers that the Bird-People had all died. In a mad rage, Red Raven accidentally causes an explosion that engulfs him and the entire island.

Red Raven eventually reappears alive, revealing that he had faked his own death, that of the Bird People, and the sinking of the island.

After capturing Medusa, Red Raven reveals that the Bird-People are an ancient offshoot of the Inhumans who had learned how to develop powers without the need of the Terrigen Mist. When Black Bolt activates the Terrigenesis Bomb, the Bird-People are exposed to the Terrigen Mist, causing Red Raven's wife Vera and many others to undergo monstrous transformations. Red Raven attempts to destroy New Attilan. However, Captain America manages to reach Vera and show that her mind is still intact inside her deformed body. Red Raven stands down while Medusa volunteers to help restore the Bird People to normal.

=== Dania ===
Red Raven

Publication information
- Publisher: Marvel Comics
- First appearance: Marvel Super-Heroes #8 (1992)
- Created by: Scott Lobdell; Chris Wozniak

In-story information
- Species: Human/Bird-People hybrid
- Abilities: Flight

Dania is a Bird-Person who was hatched on the floating island of Aerie. By age 14, Dania had spent most of her life watching video feeds of Namor and believed him to be responsible for the death of her father (presumed to be the original Red Raven).

Namor's company Oracle Inc. seeks to study the sunken Sky-Island and its technology. However, the workers are attacked by Diablo, who seeks to harness the technology for himself. Dania flies there to protect her people while Diablo awakens the Bird-People from their suspended animation, leaving Dania and Namor to fight them off. Diablo departs after rigging a set of explosives to destroy Sky-Island. Dania's father organizes his people in building a new Sky-Island.

In the series Avengers Arena, Dania is among the teenage superheroes who are captured by Arcade and forced to fight to the death in Murderworld. Dania attempts to escape the arena, but is killed after hitting an invisible force field and breaking her neck.

=== Redford Raven ===
Red Raven

Publication information
- Publisher: Marvel Comics
- First appearance: Rawhide Kid #38 (Feb. 1964)
- Created by: Stan Lee; Dick Ayers

In-story information
- Alter ego: Redford Raven
- Team affiliations: Circus of Crime
- Abilities: Gliding on artificial wings.

In the Wild West, Redford Raven is a bank robber who leads his own gang in a series of robberies until they encounter Rawhide Kid, who defeats the bank robbers and hands them over to the authorities. While in prison, Raven shares a cell with a dying Navajo medicine man, who decides to share his secrets with him. He had designed a winged harness that, treated with a secret herb, would allow the user to glide upon the winds. After the medicine man dies, Raven utilizes the harness to escape prison.

Red Raven surprises Rawhide Kid with his new abilities, managing to shoot him and leave him for dead. Rawhide Kid is saved and nursed back to health by a young Navajo, who is the son of the Navajo medicine man who gave Raven his powers. After recovering, Rawhide Kid is given a flying harness of his own to be on equal grounds with Red Raven. After Red Raven is defeated, both flying harnesses are destroyed to protect their secret.

Redford Raven later obtains a new pair of wings and joins forces with Iron Mask's gang as they form a gang called the Circus of Crime. The time-traveling West Coast Avengers, along with contemporary heroes Rawhide Kid, Two-Gun Kid, and the Phantom Rider, confront and stop the criminals in their tracks. Red Raven ends up fighting Iron Man, who tears off his wings. Red Raven and the other criminals are arrested and handed over to authorities.

== Powers and abilities ==
Red Raven's costume was reinforced synthetic stretch fabric containing miniature anti-gravity mechanisms, as well as large artificial wings which allowed Red Raven to fly. He was armed with the Bird-People's advanced weaponry, including a ray gun and an anti-gravity gun. He was proficient in basic hand-to-hand combat techniques, uniquely styled to make use of his advantage of flight.

As a Bird-Person, Dania was born with operative wings, hollow bones, and other adaptions for flight.

Redford Raven had no inherent superpowers. He possessed a pair of artificial wings and used them to glide in the wind.
