= Jeffrey Mace =

Marvel Comics fictional character

- Portion of the cover of Captain America: Patriot #1 (December 2010) featuring Jeffrey Mace as the Patriot. Art by Mitch Breitweisera.

Publication information
- Publisher: Marvel Comics
- First appearance: Human Torch Comics #4 (March 1941)
- Created by: Ray Gill; George Mandel

In-story information
- Alter ego: Jeffrey Solomon Mace
- Species: Human
- Team affiliations: Daily Bugle; Liberty Legion; All-Winners Squad
- Partnerships: Miss Patriot
- Notable aliases: Patriot, Captain America
- Abilities: Exceptional athlete Superb hand to hand combatant Licensed pilot As Captain America: Carries a titanium shield

Jeffrey Solomon Mace, also known as the Patriot and Captain America, is a superhero appearing in American comic books published by Marvel Comics. The character was created during the 1940s, a period fans and historians call the Golden Age of Comic Books. As the Patriot, he first appeared in Human Torch Comics #4 (March 1941; mis-numbered #3 on cover), published by Marvel's 1940s precursor, Timely Comics.

In 1976, Marvel revealed via retroactive continuity that Mace had become the third Captain America some time after his World War II era adventures. He is also the uncle-by-marriage of Thunderbolt Ross.

The character was adapted into the Marvel Cinematic Universe TV series Agents of S.H.I.E.L.D., portrayed by Jason O'Mara.

== Publication history ==
The superhero the Patriot debuted in The Human Torch #4 (March 1941; mis-numbered #3 on cover), with both a two-page text story by writer Ray Gill, with a spot illustration by artist Bill Everett, and a 10-page comics story by writer Gill and artist George Mandel. The character went on to appear in the first of two Human Torch issues both inadvertently numbered #5, and known to collectors as #5[a] (Summer 1941), in a story by Gill and artist Sid Greene. Concurrently, the Patriot began as regular feature in the superhero anthology Marvel Mystery Comics, appearing in issues #21–44 (July 1941 – June 1943) and #49 -74 (Nov. 1943 – July 1946), making him one of Timely's most popular characters in the second tier beneath stars Captain America, the Human Torch, and the Sub-Mariner. The Patriot story "Death Stalks the Shipyard", from Marvel Mystery Comics #29, was reprinted during the Silver Age of Comic Books in Marvel Super-Heroes #16 (Sept. 1968).

In The Avengers #97 (March 1972), Rick Jones summons Jeffrey Mace, among other Golden Age heroes, to assist the Avengers during the Kree-Skrull War.

The Patriot appeared in a four-part flashback story running through The Invaders #5–6 (March & May 1976) and Marvel Premiere #29–30 (April & June 1976), set during World War II which retconned him as a member of a newly created superhero team, the Liberty Legion. That team later appeared alongside Fantastic Four member the Thing in a two-part time travel story, set during World War II, in Marvel Two-in-One #20 (Oct. 1976) and Marvel Two-in-One Annual (1976).

When Marvel Comics had revived the character Captain America in 1964, the story explained that he had been missing in action and in suspended animation since 1945. This discrepancy with his postwar comic-book appearances was later explained as the result of replacement heroes taking on the mantle. As the third Captain America, Jeffrey Mace would have been behind the mask in Captain America Comics #59–75 (Nov. 1946 – Feb. 1950) and other comics during that period. Mace succeeded the second Captain America, William Naslund (formerly the Spirit of '76), who was shown in What If? vol. 1, #4 (Aug. 1977) as having been killed in 1946.

Mace appeared briefly in a flashback in Captain America #215 (Nov. 1977), then as a guest-star in Captain America Annual #6 (1982) with his death depicted in #285 (Sept. 1983). In a flashback, the Patriot co-starred in a World War II adventure with Captain America in Captain America Annual #13 (1994) and in a post-war adventure with the All Winners Squad in All Winners Squad 70th Anniversary Special (2009).

A retelling of Jeffrey Mace's origin and time as Captain America is told in the 2010 mini-series Captain America: Patriot. This was collected with the All Winners Squad 70th Anniversary Special and What If? #4 in 2011. What If? #4 was also collected that same year in a Captain America Legacy volume collecting the debuts of the Captain America replacements.

== Fictional character biography ==
Jeffrey Mace was born in Brooklyn, New York. He was a reporter at the Daily Bugle, who was inspired to become a superhero after seeing Captain America in action. As the Patriot, Mace becomes one of several superheroes who fight Nazi saboteurs and supervillains during World War II, sometimes alongside his sidekick Mary Morgan, a.k.a. Miss Patriot. He helps found the superhero team known as the Liberty Legion, billed as "America's home front heroes" who fight saboteurs, fifth columnists and other wartime threats within the United States.

After the war, the Patriot continues to fight crime on a regular basis, eventually helping the All-Winners Squad prevent the assassination of a young John F. Kennedy in 1946. The skirmish costs the life of the second Captain America, William Naslund (formerly the Spirit of '76). Mace is recruited to be the third Captain America, retiring in 1949. He marries Betsy Ross who, as the superhero Golden Girl, had briefly been the post-war sidekick of his Captain America, and eventually succumbs to cancer at an old age.

== Powers and abilities ==
Jeffrey Mace had no superpowers but he was an exceptional athlete, a superb hand-to-hand combatant and a licensed pilot. As Captain America, he carried a shield, similar to that used by his predecessors, that was made of enhanced titanium.

== Reception ==
In American Comic Book Chronicles: 1940-1944, Kurt Mitchell and Roy Thomas call the Patriot "a bargain-basement Captain America with an uncanny knack for stumbling into Axis conspiracies. Though Arthur "Art" Gates and Sidney "Sid" Greene did their best to replicate Jack Kirby's frenetic fight scenes, the feature had none of the charisma of its inspiration."

== In other media ==
- Jeffrey Mace appears in Agents of S.H.I.E.L.D., portrayed by Jason O'Mara. This version is an ex-journalist and the director of S.H.I.E.L.D. who gained superhuman strength and durability from a serum derived from Calvin Johnson's formula as part of "Project Patriot". However, he is initially believed to be an Inhuman. While living in a virtual reality called the Framework, Mace's personal history is rewritten to "correct" his most potent regret, making him an Inhuman. In the Framework, Mace sacrifices himself to save Phil Coulson's team and Inhumans from a Hydra attack, causing his real body to die.
- Jeffrey Mace appears in the prequel digital series Agents of S.H.I.E.L.D.: Slingshot, with Jason O'Mara reprising the role.
