= Captain America: Super Soldier =

2011 video game

- North American cover art
- Developers: Next Level Games; High Voltage Software (Wii/3DS); Griptonite Games (DS)
- Publisher: Sega
- Director: Brandon Gill
- Producers: Edoardo De Martin; William King; Paul Martin; Bjorn Nash; Tania Poulter
- Designers: Jeff King, Ian Christy; Kenneth Bowen, G. Kelly Toyama, Dylan Kelly (NDS)
- Programmers: Darwin Chau, Travis Brown-John; Zak Arntson (NDS)
- Artists: Barret Chapman; James Lutz (NDS)
- Writers: Christos Gage (story)(also NDS w Lester Milton); Barret Chapman (additional); Ian Christy (additional); Brandon Gill (additional)
- Composers: Bill Brown, Maarten Spruijt; Jacob Winkler (NDS)
- Engine: Infernal Engine (Wii)
- Platforms: Nintendo DS; PlayStation 3 Wii; Xbox 360; Nintendo 3DS
- Release: Nintendo DS, PlayStation 3, Wii, Xbox 360: EU: July 15, 2011; NA: July 19, 2011; Nintendo 3DS: EU: October 21, 2011; NA: October 25, 2011
- Genres: Action, Beat 'em up
- Mode: Single-player

Captain America: Super Soldier is a 2011 third-person single-player action-adventure video game published by Sega for Nintendo DS, PlayStation 3, Wii, Xbox 360, and Nintendo 3DS. It is based on the film Captain America: The First Avenger. The story of the game takes place during the events of the film, telling Captain America's adventures against the Red Skull and Hydra.

Hydra's castle appears in the game, as Captain America has to fight many henchmen, such as the infamous Iron Cross, the forces of Hydra, and Red Skull. Arnim Zola also appears in the game as players will have to stop his evil experiments.

Chris Evans, Neal McDonough, Hayley Atwell, Sebastian Stan, Kenneth Choi and JJ Feild reprise their roles from the film. The version for iOS is titled Captain America: Sentinel of Liberty.

== Gameplay ==
Captain America: Super Soldier combines a combat system inspired by the Batman: Arkham series with platforming elements. The character can use a variety of shield attacks that can be used to defeat enemies, solving puzzles, and climbing up walls. Captain America can also deploy a Tactical Vision that reveal the position of interactable surfaces.

The controllable character can be upgraded through Intel points. Intel points can be collected by beating soldiers or retrieving items on the battlefield.

=== Stereoscopic 3D ===
The Xbox 360 and PlayStation 3 versions of Captain America: Super Soldier include a stereoscopic 3D mode for 3D HDTVs and for 2D HDTVs via Inficolor 3D glasses. It uses TriOviz for Game Technology for stereoscopic 3D support. All Captain America: Super Soldier gameplay and cinematics have S3D support.

== Plot ==
In 1944, France, a unit of U.S. soldiers is ambushed by Hydra forces. Captain America intervenes, neutralizing the threat and notifying Howard Stark regarding the advanced enemy weaponry recovered from the field.

During a radio briefing with Peggy Carter, Captain America learns the recovered munitions contain rare metals traced to the Bavarian mountains. He is briefed on the Hydra scientist Dr. Arnim Zola's "Project: Master Man," which seeks to unlock the human genome and achieve immortality. Approaching Castle Zemo, heavy anti-aircraft fire forces Captain America to para-drop directly into the complex. He successfully disables the defensive batteries and an adjacent armory to facilitate a safe deployment for the Invaders

As the Invaders arrive, Hydra deploys a specialized energy cannon. Captain America attempts to sabotage the radar dish directing the weapon and engages Baron Wolfgang von Strucker in combat. After witnessing the Invaders' transport being struck by the cannon, Rogers is incapacitated by Strucker in a surprise attack. He awakens in Zola’s laboratory, restrained by Iron Cross and Madame Hydra. Zola reveals he has extracted blood samples to replicate Dr. Abraham Erskine's Super-Soldier Serum before joining the Captain in the castle dungeons.

Captain America escapes his cell, retrieves his equipment, and liberates Bucky Barnes. Barnes informs him that Dum Dum Dugan and James Falsworth are being held nearby. After coordinating a mass escape for the POWs, Captain America rescues Dugan and pursues Madame Hydra, who has taken Falsworth. Following a brief confrontation, Madame Hydra manages to escape.

Upon learning that the Red Skull is arriving with the Cosmic Cube to oversee Zola's research, Captain America infiltrates the primary laboratory. He prevents the administration of a perfected serum to the Red Skull and defeats Iron Cross. However, the Red Skull activates the Sleeper, a massive automaton that destroys the lab to cover his escape, while Zola transfers his consciousness into a robotic vessel.

Surviving the destruction, Captain America tracks Falsworth to a nearby village, where he destroys Zola’s robotic body and secures Falsworth's release. Reuniting with Barnes and Dugan, Captain America leads the Invaders in a final assault against the Sleeper and remaining Hydra reinforcements. Following the destruction of the automaton and the complex, Captain America and the liberated forces successfully withdraw from the area.

== Reception ==
Reception

Aggregate score
Aggregator	Score		
Aggregator	PS3	Wii	Xbox 360
Metacritic	61/100	57/100	60/100

Review scores
Publication	Score		
Publication	PS3	Wii	Xbox 360
G4			4/5
GameSpot	6.5/10	6.0/10	6.5/10
IGN	5/10	5.5/10	5/10
PlayStation Official Magazine – UK	7/10		

The game received mixed reviews upon release, with review aggregation site Metacritic giving the Xbox 360 version an average score of 60/100, the PlayStation 3 a 61/100, and the Wii a 57/100.

IGN gave the game a 5/10, praising the "solid and varied combat", but criticizing the lack of cinematic experience. GameSpot gave 6.5/10, stating "Captain America bashes enemies with style, but a dull story and bland visuals keep Super Soldier from being a star-spangled success". Some reviews were generally positive with G4 giving the game a 4/5, offering praise for rising above then-recent comic book adaptations Thor: God of Thunder and Iron Man 2, and the UK's PlayStation Official Magazine giving the game 7 out of 10, praising the combat and general tone of the game but criticizing elements of the presentation and reliance on 'Quick Time Events'.
