= U.S.A. Comics =

American comic-book series

- U.S.A. Comics #1 (Aug. 1941), featuring the Defender. Cover art by Joe Simon and Jack Kirby (pencilers) & Joe Simon (inker).

Publication information
- Publisher: Timely Comics
- Schedule: Monthly (1941–44); Quarterly (1944–45)
- Publication date: August 1941 – Fall 1945
- No. of issues: 17

Creative team
- Created by: Joe Simon
- Written by: Joe Simon; Stan Lee
- Artist(s): Joe Simon; Jack Kirby; Alex Schomburg; Basil Wolverton

U.S.A. Comics is an American comic-book series that was published by Marvel Comics' 1930–1940s predecessor, Timely Comics, during the period fans and historians call the Golden Age of comic books.

A superhero anthology running 17 issues cover-dated August 1941 to Fall 1945, it showcased early work by industry legends Joe Simon, Jack Kirby, and Stan Lee, and famed cartoonist Basil Wolverton, introduced the Whizzer and other characters, and for much of its run starred Captain America during that long-running character's World War II height of popularity.

== Publication history ==
U.S.A. Comics came from publisher Martin Goodman's Timely Comics, which by the early 1960s would evolve into Marvel. It was initially edited by Joe Simon, Timely's first editor, followed briefly by future Marvel chief Stan Lee very early in his career, and then by interim editor Vincent Fago during Lee's U.S. military duty from early 1942 through 1945. The series was first announced in Captain America Comics #1 with an expected sale date of January 20, and the features Mr. Liberty, Sky Devil, Young Allies, United States Man, Headline Hunter: Foreign Correspondent, The Black Ace, and The Star.

A superhero anthology with no regular starring feature until Captain America began headlining with issue #6 (Dec. 1942), U.S.A. Comics introduced at least two notable characters: super-speedster the Whizzer and mythological ice-king Jack Frost, both in issue #1 (Aug. 1941). Both heroes were revived in 1970s Marvel Comics, generally but not exclusively in flashback stories depicting them in retroactive continuity as members of the World War II superhero team called the Liberty Legion. The first Jack Frost story, penciled by Charles Nicholas, is the leading contender for Lee's first published comics script, as opposed to a text story.

Additional superheroes introduced in U.S.A. Comics include the Defender, by co-creators Joe Simon and Jack Kirby, Mr. Liberty (renamed Major Liberty the following issue) by Syd Shores, Rockman by Basil Wolverton, and Young Avenger by Mike Roy, all in issue #1; Captain Terror by Mike Suchorsky, and the Vagabond by Ed Winiarski in issue #2 (Nov. 1941); crusading reporter Tom Powers in the feature "Powers of the Press" by Ed Winiarski in issue #3 (Jan. 1942); the American Avenger by Vince Alascia in issue #5 (Summer 1942); and the war-hero feature "Jap Buster Johnson" in issue #6 (Dec. 1942).

The first several appearances of Captain America in U.S.A. Comics were bullpen collaborations involving multiple pencilers likely including Al Avison, Syd Shores, Mike Sekowsky, Ernie Hart and a young Carmine Infantino, with inkers including Hart and George Klein. As of early 2013, comics historians have not identified the creative teams behind the character's appearances in issue #9 or #11 onward.

Alex Schomburg, Timely's most prolific early cover artist, drew the covers of issues #4, 6–7, 12–13, and 15. Unusually, Schomburg provided interior artwork for the Captain Daring story in #7. This Captain Daring is not the character who appeared in later issues of Daring Mystery Comics, but is instead a continuation of the "G-Man Don Gorman" feature from Daring Mystery Comics #4.

== List of features ==
- The Defender #1-4 (August 1941-May 1942)
- The Whizzer #1, 2, 4, 6, 8-10, 12, 14, 16, 17 (August 1941, November 1941, May 1942, December 1942, May 1943-September 1943, March 1944, September 1944, June 1945, September 1945)
- Mr. Liberty/Major Liberty #1-4 (August 1941-May 1942)
- Rockman: Underground Secret Agent #1-4 (August 1941-May 1942)
- Young Avenger #1 (August 1941)
- Jack Frost #1-4 (August 1941-May 1942)
- Captain Terror #2-4 (November 1941-May 1942)
- The Vagabond #2-4 (November 1941-May 1942)
- Unsolved Mysteries #3 (January 1942)
- Powers of the Press #3 (January 1942)
- Corporal Dix/Sergeant Dix #4-6, 8-13 (May 1942-December 1942, May 1943-June 1944)
- Victory Boys #5 (June 1942)
- Black Widow #5 (June 1942)
- Lamb/Powers #5 (June 1942)
- The Fighting Hobo #5 (June 1942)
- The Blue Blade #5 (June 1942)
- Roko the Amazing #5 (June 1942)
- Gypo, the Gypsy Giant #5 (June 1942)
- American Avenger #5 (June 1942)
- Captain America #6-17 (December 1942-September 1945)
- Terror Squad #6 (December 1942)
- The Destroyer #6, 8-14, 16, 17 (December 1942, May 1943-September 1944, June 1945, September 1945)
- Edward A. Flaherty #6 (December 1942) [one-shot biography]
- Jeep Jones #6-9, 12, 13 (December 1942-July 1943, March 1944, June 1944)
- Tommy Colt #6 (December 1942)
- Jap Buster Johnson #6-14 (December 1942-September 1944)
- Captain Daring and His Sky-Sharks #7 (March 1943)
- Marvel Boy #7 (March 1943)
- Disk-Eyes the Detective #7 (March 1943)
- Secret Stamp #7-8 (March 1943-May 1943)
- Private Albert A. Schmidt #8 (May 1943) [one-shot biography]
- Barney Ross #9 (July 1943) [one-shot biography]
- Thunderbird #10 (September 1943) [one-shot biography]
- Detective Mike Trapp #13, 16 (June 1944, June 1945)

== Collected editions ==
- Marvel Masterworks: Golden Age USA Comics Vol. 1 (U.S.A. Comics #1-4)
- Marvel Masterworks: Golden Age USA Comics Vol. 2 (U.S.A. Comics #5-8) ISBN 9780785133650
