= Al Avison =

American comic book artist

- Born: Alfred Dean Avison; July 7, 1920 Norwalk, Connecticut, U.S.
- Died: December 1984 (aged 64) Darien, Connecticut, U.S.
- Areas: Penciller, Inker
- Notable works: Whizzer

Alfred Dean Avison (July 7, 1920 – December 1984) was an American comic book artist known for his work on the Marvel Comics characters the Whizzer, which he co-created, and Captain America during the 1930–1940s period known to fans and historians as the Golden Age of comic books.

== Biography ==
=== Early life and career ===
Born in Norwalk, Connecticut, the son of artist and WPA muralist George Avison, Al Avison was influenced by the work of his father and of commercial illustrator Albert Dorne. He studied art at Pratt Institute in Brooklyn. His first known comics work is co-inking Jack Kirby's lead story in Novelty Press' Blue Bolt Comics #4 (cover-dated Sept. 1940).

=== Timely Comics ===
For Marvel Comics' 1940s predecessor, Timely Comics, penciler Avison and an unknown writer co-created super-speedster the Whizzer in U.S.A. Comics #1 (Aug. 1941). The character would appear in most issues of that comic, and was part of Timely/Marvel's first superhero team, the All-Winners Squad.

After Captain America creators Jack Kirby and Joe Simon moved on following Captain America Comics #10 (Jan. 1942), Avison and Syd Shores became regular pencilers of the title, with one generally inking over the other. Avison had been the inker over penciler Kirby on Captain America Comics #4-6 (June-Sept. 1941), and had penciled or inked that character's stories in All Winners Comics as early as issue #3 (Winter 1941-42). Shores would take over as regular penciller, inked by Vince Alascia, while Avison did his World War II military service.

Avison also worked as a penciler or, more often, as inker on characters including the Vision (in Marvel Mystery Comics); the Blonde Phantom; the Young Allies (in Amazing Comics, Kid Komics and Mystic Comics); the Black Marvel (in All Winners Comics); and Tommy Tyme (in Mystic Comics). With Joe Simon, he was one of two inkers on the Kirby-drawn debut of Marvel Boy in Daring Mystery Comics #6 (Sept. 1940). Avison's Timely work appears as late as Captain America Comics #71 (March 1949).

=== Other work ===
Avison additionally worked on the original Captain Marvel for Fawcett Comics in 1941-42. He also freelanced for Harvey Comics both during and after his Timely stint, on such features as "The Red Blazer" (introducing him in Pocket Comics #1, Aug. 1941), "Casper the Friendly Ghost", "Captain Freedom" (including inking Jack Kirby's cover art on Speed Comics #16 & #18, Jan. & May 1942), "Joe Palooka", "The Green Hornet", "Humphrey", "Little Dot" and "Shock Gibson" (including the cover of Speed Comics #14, Dec. 1941), through at least the early 1950s.

Avison's last known work is penciling and inking the cover of Harvey's horror anthology Chamber of Chills #26 (Dec. 1954).

Avision was married to Margaret Bernice Callaway, and had children Todd Christopher Avison and Kimberly Dean Avison. According to his son and widow, Avison was at least one of the artists who contributed to the design of Mr. Met, the New York Mets mascot that debuted in 1963.

Avison died in December 1984 in Darien, Connecticut.
