= Iron Cross (Marvel Comics) =

Iron Cross is the name of two fictional characters appearing in American comic books published by Marvel Comics.

== Publication history ==
The Helmut Gruler version of Iron Cross first appears in The Invaders #35 (Dec. 1978) and was created by Roy Thomas and Don Heck.

The Clare Gruler version of Iron Cross first appeared in All-New Invaders #9 (Aug. 2014) and was created by James Robinson and Steve Pugh.

== Fictional character biography ==
=== Helmut Gruler ===
Iron Cross

Publication information
- Publisher: Marvel Comics
- First appearance: The Invaders #35 (Dec. 1978)
- Created by: Roy Thomas; Don Heck

In-story information
- Alter ego: Helmut Gruler
- Team affiliations: V-Battalion
- Abilities: Armored suit grants: Superhuman strength and durability Flight via boot jets Limited longevity Several offensive weapons

Helmut Gruler is a World War II German soldier who first appears in the title Invaders. Gruler volunteers to wear armor created by Professor Franz Schneider for use against the Allied forces. Using the alias "Iron Cross", the character creates havoc until he is apparently killed during a battle with superhero team the Invaders.

Iron Cross reappears in the modern Marvel universe in the title Midnight Sons Unlimited, having apparently been saved and sustained by his armor.

Iron Cross is later revealed to have been a founding member of the V-Battalion, a secret group dedicated to hunting down war criminals. Iron Cross apparently dies while stopping Hydra from spreading nanotechnology across Earth.

=== Clare Gruler ===
Clare Gruler is the daughter of Helmut Gruler who took on her father's legacy and became a hero in Germany. Claire previously wielded the Iron Cross armor, but was fused with the suit when her Inhuman gene activated, transforming her into a cyborg.

She later battles Neo-Nazi forces in Germany and requests help from the All-New Invaders. They are interrupted by the Inhuman Lash, who is attempting to recruit Iron Cross, Toro, and the Neo-Nazi leader, who did not know he was an Nuhuman. Medusa and the Inhuman Royal Court appear and Lash leaves with the Neo-Nazi, who abandons the Nazi cause since he does not have pure Aryan blood. The Invaders later disband and Iron Cross returns to Germany to protect it from evil.

== Powers and abilities ==
Helmut Gruler wears an advanced suit of armor that provides superhuman strength and durability, and flight via boot jets. The armor also has several offensive features, and is capable of releasing electric current, sleeping gas and an inky fluid similar to that discharged by an octopus. The suit provides some longevity by sustaining Gruler's body.

Clare Gruler's Iron Cross armor grants her flight and energy discharge. As an Inhuman, she possessed the ability of molecular bonding; however, this power only worked once when her Inhuman gene activated, fusing her with her armor.

== In other media ==
The Helmut Gruler incarnation of Iron Cross appears as a boss in Captain America: Super Soldier, voiced by Michael Donovan. This version works for Hydra under the Red Skull and Arnim Zola.
