= Nuklo =

- Nuklo makes his first cover appearance, from The Avengers Annual #6.

Publication information
- Publisher: Marvel Comics
- First appearance: Giant-Size Avengers #1 (August 1974)
- Created by: Roy Thomas; Rich Buckler; Dan Adkins

In-story information
- Alter ego: Robert Frank, Jr
- Species: Human mutant
- Team affiliations: V-Battalion
- Abilities: Superhuman strength Radiation generation Ability to project an aura that absorbs force used against him and divide himself into three bodies

Nuklo (Robert Frank, Jr.) is a fictional character, a mutant appearing in American comic books published by Marvel Comics. He is the son of two characters featured in the Golden Age of Comic Books, the Whizzer and Miss America.

== Publication history ==
Nuklo first appeared in Giant-Size Avengers #1 (August 1974), and was created by Roy Thomas, Rich Buckler and Dan Adkins.

== Fictional character biography ==
Nuklo is the son of Robert Frank and Madeline Joyce, also known as the Whizzer and Miss America. Robert and Madeline had previously retired from heroics after the end of World War II, married, revealed their identities to the government, and took jobs at an early nuclear power plant. While pregnant, Madeline is exposed to high levels of radiation. This causes her son, Robert Frank Jr., to be born a mutant with the ability to generate radiation. The government persuades Robert's parents to place him in a special capsule that will drain his radiation and slow his aging process.

The capsule containing Robert is placed in the basement of a government building for several decades until the building collapsed and the capsule was recovered by the Avengers. The Whizzer attempts to reclaim the capsule, but is stopped by the Avengers. Shortly thereafter, the Avengers accidentally release Robert, who has since grown to the age of 12. He is still highly radioactive and is disoriented by his reawakening. Following a battle with the Avengers, Nuklo is rendered unconscious by a hex cast by Scarlet Witch.

Nuklo is taken to the government facility Project Pegasus for treatment and study. There, he is educated and has his radiation levels reduced to a safe level. The Whizzer's enemy Isbisa, disguised as radiologist Ira Bishoff, drains Nuklo's radiation to empower himself and seek revenge against the Whizzer. Isbisa attacks Robert Frank as he is working on a court order to gain custody of Nuklo. The Whizzer dies from a heart attack while rescuing Nuklo, who is permanently cured of his excess radiation.

Following the Whizzer's death, Nuklo is placed in the custody of Linda Hyams, his psychologist, with whom he lives in upstate New York. He later becomes a member of the Penance Council of the V-Battalion.

== Powers and abilities ==
Nuklo has superhuman strength and can project an aura that absorbs force used against him. He can emit dangerous radiation, and can divide himself into three bodies united by a single mind.
