= Whizzer (Robert Frank) =

- The Whizzer (Robert Frank), as depicted on the cover of Invaders #35 (December 1978). Art by Alan Kupperberg.

Publication information
- Publisher: Marvel Comics
- First appearance: USA Comics #1 (Aug. 1941)
- Created by: Al Avison (penciller; writer unknown)

In-story information
- Alter ego: Robert L. Frank
- Species: Human mutant (latent)
- Team affiliations: Liberty Legion; Invaders; All-Winners Squad; Avengers
- Abilities: Self-taught hand to hand combatant Superhuman speed and reflexes

The Whizzer (Robert L. Frank) is a superhero appearing in American comic books published by Marvel Comics. He first appeared during the period called the Golden Age of Comic Books.

The Whizzer has super-speed powers, which (in his original origin story) he acquired from an infusion of mongoose blood. He appeared in both USA Comics and All Winners Comics from 1941 to 1946, and was revived by Marvel in the 1970s.

== Publication history ==
Robert Frank / Whizzer first appeared in U.S.A. Comics #1 (August 1941), published by Timely Comics. The character was created by penciller Al Avison and an uncredited writer. One source credits Stan Lee as the writer, but there are no other sources to support the credit. The Whizzer appeared regularly in U.S.A. Comics through issue #17 (September 1945).

At the same time, Whizzer also appeared regularly in All Winners Comics, from issue #2 (September 1941) through #21 (December 1946). In issues #19 and #21, he was part of the All Winners Squad, a superteam that also included Captain America, Bucky Barnes, the Human Torch, Toro, the Sub-Mariner and Miss America. These were the character's last appearances during the 1940s.

Writer Roy Thomas reintroduced the Golden Age Whizzer in Giant-Size Avengers #1 (August 1974). Two years later, in The Avengers Annual #6 (November 1976), writer Gerry Conway retconned the character to be a mutant whose abilities were activated by the mongoose blood transfusion. In The Invaders (March–May 1976) and Marvel Premiere (April–June 1976), written by Thomas, the Whizzer joined the Invaders and the Liberty Legion.

== Fictional character biography ==
Robert L. Frank was born in St. Louis, Missouri. After the mobster Granno frames him and his father Emil for murder, they flee to Africa, where Robert develops a fever (originally, his was depicted as being bitten by a cobra). Emil saves him with a transfusion of mongoose blood (the same mongoose that killed the cobra in the initial story), but dies soon after from stress. After developing superhuman speed from the transfusion and defeating Granno, Frank then decides to fight crime and eventually accepts the offer of Invaders member Bucky, who forms the superhero team the Liberty Legion to rescue the other Invaders from the Red Skull. When the Liberty Legion and Invaders disband after World War II, the Whizzer joins the All-Winners Squad.

The Whizzer afterward spent some years battling alcoholism and depression and was, for some time, homeless in the Bowery section of Manhattan. He also works as a nuclear laboratory technician.

In 1942, the Whizzer acquired a new sidekick, a stereotyped African-American friend named Slow-Motion Jones. Slow-Motion always had a phone in his hat available in order to contact The Whizzer immediately when there is trouble. Pre-dating modern cell phones by decades and looking just like a hand-held receiver, how it works goes unexplained. In the second of these stories, it is attached to a folding gadget inside his hat, but no obvious wire. The Whizzer also began using the alias "Jack Robinson," as in "faster than you can say Jack Robinson" and expanded the wings on his headdress to show a full bird rather than simply wings. He wrote about how he received his powers in his diary. Frank Rone, a burglar who robbed his safe was able to duplicate his powers and became a formidable foe, but lacked Whizzer's experience.

In the modern age, the Whizzer reappears as an aging hero who had married fellow superhero Miss America. The Whizzer encounters and briefly serves with the Avengers, who aid him in controlling his son Nuklo. He is reunited with Nuklo, but suffers a heart attack. At the end of this adventure, the Whizzer erroneously believes himself to be the father of Quicksilver and Scarlet Witch.

The Whizzer was later duped by the Living Laser into battling the Avengers, and suffers a second heart attack. He then battled the Atlanteans and Namor alongside the Avengers. After a humbling defeat at the hands of the supervillain Count Nefaria the Whizzer retires.

He later returns to fight a final battle against his old enemy Isbisa. The Whizzer dies after suffering a fatal heart attack while fighting Isbisa, but his sacrifice enables Nuklo to be cured of his excessive radiation and begin a normal life.

Arnim Zola later creates a clone of Whizzer who is killed by Deadpool.

== Powers and abilities ==
Due to a reaction between his latent genetic mutation and an injection of mongoose blood, Robert Frank has the ability to move at superhuman speed and has superhuman reflexes. He can create cyclones by running in circles, and can run up walls and across water. Even in middle age, he could run at approximately 100 mph.

The Whizzer uses a unique, self-taught fighting style that exploits the ability to move at superhuman speeds.

== Enemies ==
Whizzer has had his own group of enemies during his superhero career:

- Granno - The mobster that forced him and his father to leave the country through frame-up.
- Black - Don Reinman is the prison warden of Tolegate Prison who became the skull-masked Black to set off a prison riot after discovering oil underneath Tolegate Prison.
- Frank Rone, brother of police office Arthur Rone, burgled the Whizzer's apartment and found his diary in his safe and was able to duplicate the Whizzer's powers, which he used against his brother and sister-in-law (Sally) before the Whizzer used his greater experience with speed powers to stop him.
- League of Petty Crime - A quartet of criminals led by the corrupt prison warden Balew.
- Leet Brannis - Leet Brannis was a gangster who operated from a local pawn shop. He and his men typically robbed jewelry stores and other places where they could get their hands on easy cash. Eventually, Whizzer caught onto Brannis and his men and foiled their plans.
- Lens - A Nazi spy who smuggled jewelry into North America that were tainted with a poison.
- Mr. Tho - The owner of radio relay stations who the Nazis swayed to their side and forced to bomb his own radio relay stations.
- Paul Smythe - A department store general manager who worked with Lens.
- Riko - A mob leader who led his mob into robbing a bank and trapping its employees in a vault.
- Triple Destruction - A Nazi saboteur who led his minions into blowing up the munitions plants.

== Reception ==
- In 2018, Comic Book Resources (CBR) ranked Whizzer (Robert Frank) 25th in their "25 Fastest Characters In The Marvel Universe" list.
- In 2022, CBR ranked Whizzer 19th in their "Marvel: The 20 Fastest Speedsters" list.

== Other versions ==
- An alternate universe version of Robert Frank / Whizzer, amalgamated with DC Comics character Jay Garrick / Flash, called the Whiz appears in the Amalgam Comics one-shot Super Soldier: Man of War (June 1997). He is a member of the All Star Winners Squad.
- A zombified, alternate universe version of the Whizzer appears in Marvel Zombies 3 #3.

== In other media ==
- Robert Frank / Whizzer appears in Spider-Man: The Animated Series, voiced by Walker Edmiston in the present and Cain DeVore in flashbacks. This version, along with the Black Marvel, the Destroyer, Miss America, and the Thunderer, obtained his powers from a flawed attempt at recreating the process that empowered Captain America during World War II, which he regulates with a special ring.
- Robert Frank / Whizzer appears in the Ultimate Spider-Man episode "S.H.I.E.L.D. Academy", voiced by Robert Patrick. This version operated during World War II before becoming a teacher at the titular school.
