= Miss America (Madeline Joyce) =

Marvel Comics superhero

Madeline Joyce Miss America
- Artwork from Miss America Comics #1 (1944). Art by either Ken Bald or Pauline Loth (sources vary).

Publication information
- Publisher: Marvel Comics
- First appearance: Marvel Mystery Comics #49 (November 1943)
- Created by: Otto Binder (writer); Al Gabriele (artist)

In-story information
- Alter ego: Madeline Joyce Frank
- Species: Human mutant (latent)
- Team affiliations: All-Winners Squad; Liberty Legion; V-Battalion; Invaders
- Abilities: Superhuman strength, durability, and stamina; Flight

Miss America (Madeline Joyce Frank) is a superhero appearing in American comic books published by Marvel Comics. Created by writer Otto Binder and artist Al Gabriele, the character first appeared in Marvel Mystery Comics #49 (November 1943) in the Golden Age of Comic Books. Madeline Joyce is the first incarnation of Miss America. The character has also been a member of the Invaders, Liberty Legion, and All-Winners Squad at various points in her history.

== Publication history ==
As superheroes began to fade out of fashion in the post-World War II era, comic-book publishers scrambled to explore new types of stories, characters, and audiences. In an attempt to appeal to young female readers, comics companies began introducing more female superheroes, including Timely's Blonde Phantom, Golden Girl, Namora, Sun Girl, and Venus, and its teen-humor star Millie the Model. Fox Comics' revival of Quality Comics' Phantom Lady and DC's Black Canary.

Quality Comics had featured an unrelated character called Miss America in Military Comics in 1941 and 1942. In November 1943, Timely Comics published Marvel Mystery Comics #49, featuring a new character by the name "Miss America."

Following two appearances in Marvel Mystery, Timely's Miss America received her own book, Miss America Comics (no cover date) in early 1944. Some sources list Ken Bald as the cover and interior artist, though Vincent Fago, Timely's interim editor for the drafted Stan Lee, recalled, "I hired a friend from the animation business, Pauline Loth, and she did the art for the first Miss America book." Fago has also stated, "I hired her at Timely when she left Fleischer's and came to New York. She did "Miss America" for us and created her costume."

The series changed its format with its second issue to become the larger, magazine-sized Miss America Magazine (renamed Miss America starting with issue #46, July 1952), though with the conventional comic book combination of glossy covers and newsprint interior. Initiating this format as vol. 1 #2 (Nov. 1944), the publication relegated its superhero to a secondary role and began focusing on teen-romance comics stories plus articles on such topics as cooking, fashion, and makeup. This second issue—which featured a photo cover of an unknown model dressed in the Miss America costume—also introduced the long-running, teen-humor comics feature "Patsy Walker."

According to Jess Nevins' Encyclopedia of Golden Age Superheroes, Miss America "fights ordinary criminals, Axis agents, Baron Shinto the Gouger, the murderous teen the Cherub, King Cobra, and the human electric eel the Shocker."

Together with the single superhero comic, Miss America ran 126 issues in a complicated numbering that continued through vol. 7 #50 (March 1953), the 83rd issue. It then reverted to comic book format as Miss America vol. 1 #51–93 (April 1953 – Nov. 1958). The magazine format used photo covers of everyday teens. In 1951, starting with vol. 7 #42, the logo changed to Patsy Walker Starring in Miss America, with covers now depicting high schooler, Patsy, boyfriend Buzz Baxter, and romantic-rival Hedy Wolfe, in cartoon art by, variously, Al Jaffee or Morris Weiss.

The character appeared in a posthumous flashback in the Marvel Comics publication Giant-Size Avengers #1 (August 1974).

== Fictional character biography ==
Socially aware teenage heiress Madeline Joyce was born in Washington, D.C., and was the niece and ward of radio mogul James Bennet, who was sponsoring Professor Lawson, a scientist claiming to have gotten superpowers through a device that had been struck by lightning. Joyce, secretly tampering with the contraption during a thunderstorm that night, herself gained the ability to fly and great strength after lightning similarly struck, knocking her unconscious (she originally had x-ray vision, as well as other powers, but after her few early appearances they were retconned). The panicky scientist, seeing the apparently dead young woman, destroyed the device and then killed himself. Joyce survived to fight crime as the patriotically garbed Miss America, appearing regularly in Marvel Mystery Comics and All Winners Comics.

Cover detail, All Winners Comics #21 (Winter 1946–47): In a superhero rarity, Miss America wears glasses.

In the latter, she was a member of Timely's superhero team the All-Winners Squad, fighting alongside Captain America and Bucky, the original Human Torch and Toro, the Sub-Mariner, and the Whizzer in the group's two Golden Age adventures. In the second of these, she wore glasses, one of the few superheroes to require them. Miss America made her final Golden Age appearance in Marvel Mystery Comics #85 (Feb. 1948).

Joyce was later revealed to have married fellow Golden Age superhero Robert Frank (the Whizzer). Because the two had been exposed to radiation, their first child was the radioactive mutant Nuklo. However, Joyce died of complications stemming from childbirth with her second, stillborn child due to radiation poisoning from her first offspring while at Mount Wundagore, Transia. It was also suggested during this time that Joyce and Frank were the parents of Avengers members Quicksilver and the Scarlet Witch, although this was ultimately refuted when it was revealed that Magneto and his wife Magda were those twins' biological parents. Miss America was then retconned in 1976 as a member of the World War II super-team the Liberty Legion, set between the creation of the Invaders and the post-war All-Winners Squad. As a member of the Liberty Legion, she battled the Red Skull, and alongside the Liberty Legion and Invaders, she batted the Nazi super-team Super-Axis.

Miss America returned from the dead for 24 hours in the 2006 miniseries X-Statix Presents: Dead Girl, where she was revealed to be spending an eternity in Hell. However, in the All-New Official Handbook of the Marvel Universe A-Z, select entries of characters featured in that miniseries, including that of the Ancient One, state that the characters in hell were impostors.

Miss America's reanimated corpse later appears as a cyborg resident of the Core, a subterranean city populated by advanced robots. The cyborg does battle with Miss America's former teammate, the Human Torch, and attempts to lull him into a false sense of security. The Torch however, realizes that the cyborg is not really his old friend, merely a puppet using her body.

== Powers and abilities ==
Madeline Joyce acquired a range of superpowers after her latent mutation was activated upon being exposed to an electrical discharge from an unknown experimental piece of equipment. She possesses the "Strength of a Thousand Men," allowing her to lift weights far heavier than a normal human would be capable of lifting. Her superhuman durability makes her resistant to different forms of damage. She has the ability to levitate herself through psionic means. By using her levitation ability in connection with carefully planned leaps, Miss America could use her power to fly. She could attain any height at which she could still breathe (approximately 20,000 feet). Fatigue poisons accumulate much slower in Madeline Joyce's body than that of a normal human, giving her a heightened "vitality."

== Reception ==
=== Critical response ===
Deirdre Kaye of Scary Mommy called Madeline Joyce a "role model" and a "truly heroic" female character. Mat Elfring of GameSpot included Madeline Joyce in their "20 Most Patriotic Comic Book Characters" list. Steven Schneider of Screen Rant ranked Madeline Joyce 1st in their "First Female Comic Book Superheroes In History" list, writing, "The original Miss America was, in a lot of ways, the quintessential World War II superheroine: she fought alongside heroes like Captain America and Bucky, battled the Axis Powers and somehow wore a skirt while fighting crime." Megan Nicole O'Brien of Comic Book Resources ranked Madeline Joyce 3rd in their "Marvel: 10 Best Golden Age Heroines" list.

=== Impact ===
Madeline Joyce was the third female comic book heroine to get her own solo book, after Wonder Woman and Sheena, Queen of the Jungle.

== In other media ==
- Madeline Joyce / Miss America was loosely adapted for the Japanese television series Battle Fever J as part of a collaboration between Marvel Comics and the Japanese studio Toei. Despite retaining the codename, the costume and character were changed for the series.
- Madeline Joyce / Miss America appears in the Spider-Man: The Animated Series five-part episode "Six Forgotten Warriors", voiced by Kathy Garver. This version, along with the Black Marvel, the Destroyer, the Thunderer, and the Whizzer, obtained her powers from a flawed attempt at recreating the process that empowered Captain America during World War II, which she regulates with a special ring.
- Madeline Joyce / Miss America makes a non-speaking cameo appearance in a flashback in the Ultimate Spider-Man episode "S.H.I.E.L.D. Academy" as a member of the Invaders.
