= Invaders (comics) =

Marvel Comics superhero team

- Cover of The Invaders #1 (August 1975); Art by John Romita Sr.

Publication information
- Publisher: Marvel Comics
- First appearance: The Avengers #71 (December 1969)
- Created by: Roy Thomas; Sal Buscema

In-story information
- Base(s): Various
- Member(s): Current members: Captain America (Sam Wilson); Human Torch; Iron Cross (Clare Gruler); Namor; Radiance; Toro; Bucky Barnes; Former members: Blazing Skull; Blonde Phantom; Bucky (Fred Davis); Captain America (William Nasland); Captain America (Steve Rogers); The Fin; Major Mapleleaf; Miss America; Nia Noble; Silver Scorpion; Spitfire; Tara; Thin Man; Union Jack (Joseph Chapman); Union Jack (Brian Falsworth); Union Jack (James Falsworth); U.S. Agent; Vision (Aarkus); Whizzer

The Invaders is the name of two superhero teams appearing in American comic books published by Marvel Comics.

== Publication history ==
The original team was created by writer Roy Thomas and artist Sal Buscema in The Avengers #71 (December 1969).

A present-day incarnation was introduced by writer Chuck Austen and artist Scott Kolins in The Avengers (vol. 3) #82 (July 2004).

== Fictional team history ==
The prototype for the Invaders, the All-Winners Squad, created by publisher Martin Goodman and scripter Bill Finger, was a comic book feature published in the Golden Age with only two appearances, in All Winners Comics #19 (Fall 1946) and #21 (Winter 1947; there was no issue #20).

This team had much of the same membership as the Invaders, but had its adventures in the post–World War II era, the time that their adventures were published.

This group was also notable as its members did not entirely get along, prefiguring the internal conflicts of the Fantastic Four in the 1960s.

=== World War II ===
The Invaders team first appeared in flashback stories set during World War II, and comprised existing characters from Timely Comics, the 1940s predecessor of Marvel. Originally, Captain America (Steve Rogers), his sidekick Bucky Barnes, the original android Human Torch ("Jim Hammond"), the Torch's sidekick Toro (Thomas Raymond) and Namor were together as heroes opposing the forces of Nazism. When these superheroes saved British Prime Minister Winston Churchill from Master Man, Churchill suggested that they should become a team, known as the Invaders.

The Invaders fight the Axis powers over the world until eventually finding themselves in England, where they meet James Falsworth, the original Union Jack. He joins the team and provides them with a base of operations in England. Eventually, Falsworth's children Brian (Union Jack) and Jacqueline (Spitfire) become members. The team later adds Miss America (Madeline Joyce) and super-speedster the Whizzer (Bob Frank), during a battle with the Super-Axis. Later, against the threat of the Battle-Axis, the team is assisted by the Blazing Skull and the Silver Scorpion.

The team continues to fight against several threats, (including a Nazi occupation of Atlantis and the emergence of HYDRA backed by the time-travelling Baron Strucker) and faces an emotional trauma with the apparent deaths of Captain America and Bucky in a drone aircraft's explosion near the end of World War II, as first described in The Avengers #4 (March 1964). After the war's end, several members—including the second Bucky and Captain America (respectively, Fred Davis and William Naslund, formerly the superhero known as the Spirit of '76)—created a new team, the All-Winners Squad. When that team dissolves, Marvel retroactively changes the continuity ("retcon") of several members, having them join Citizen V's V-Battalion.

After the Invaders' introduction in the pages of The Avengers, the team appeared in its own try-out title, Giant-Size Invaders #1 in 1975, followed by the ongoing series; The Invaders later that year, and a single Annual in 1977. Issues #5–6 of the series introduced another retroactively changed World War II team, the Liberty Legion, in a two-part story arc, "The Red Skull Strikes", interlaced with another two-part story in Marvel Premiere #29–30.

=== New Invaders ===
New Invaders #2, cover art by Scott Kolins

In 2004, a new Invaders team was created in the four-issue story arc "Once an Invader...", beginning with The Avengers (vol. 3) #82, written by Chuck Austen. The revived team was spun off into its own title, The New Invaders, running 10 issues (August 2004 – June 2005) beginning with issue #0. It was written by Allan Jacobsen with artwork by C. P. Smith.

The new team consisted of the Blazing Skull (Mark Todd), a flame-generating girl named Tara, former Liberty Legion member Thin Man (Bruce Dickson), U.S. Agent (John Walker, a.k.a. Captain America), Union Jack (Joey Chapman) and returning members Namor and Spitfire. Later, the android the Human Torch joins the team, feeling an affinity for Tara, revealed as an android herself. The Invaders are also assisted by former Golden Age hero the Fin and his Atlantean wife Nia, although they did not officially join the team.

They are formed by the supposed U.S. Secretary of Defense Dell Rusk—in actuality the Red Skull—who coerces the Thin Man into gathering this new team, which the Skull intends to use for his own goals. The new Invaders eventually learn of the plan, however, and thwart it. The apparent "death" of the android Human Torch came as a result of the betrayal of the Skull-planted Tara. The majority of the members quit the team after this incident.

=== Avengers/Invaders ===
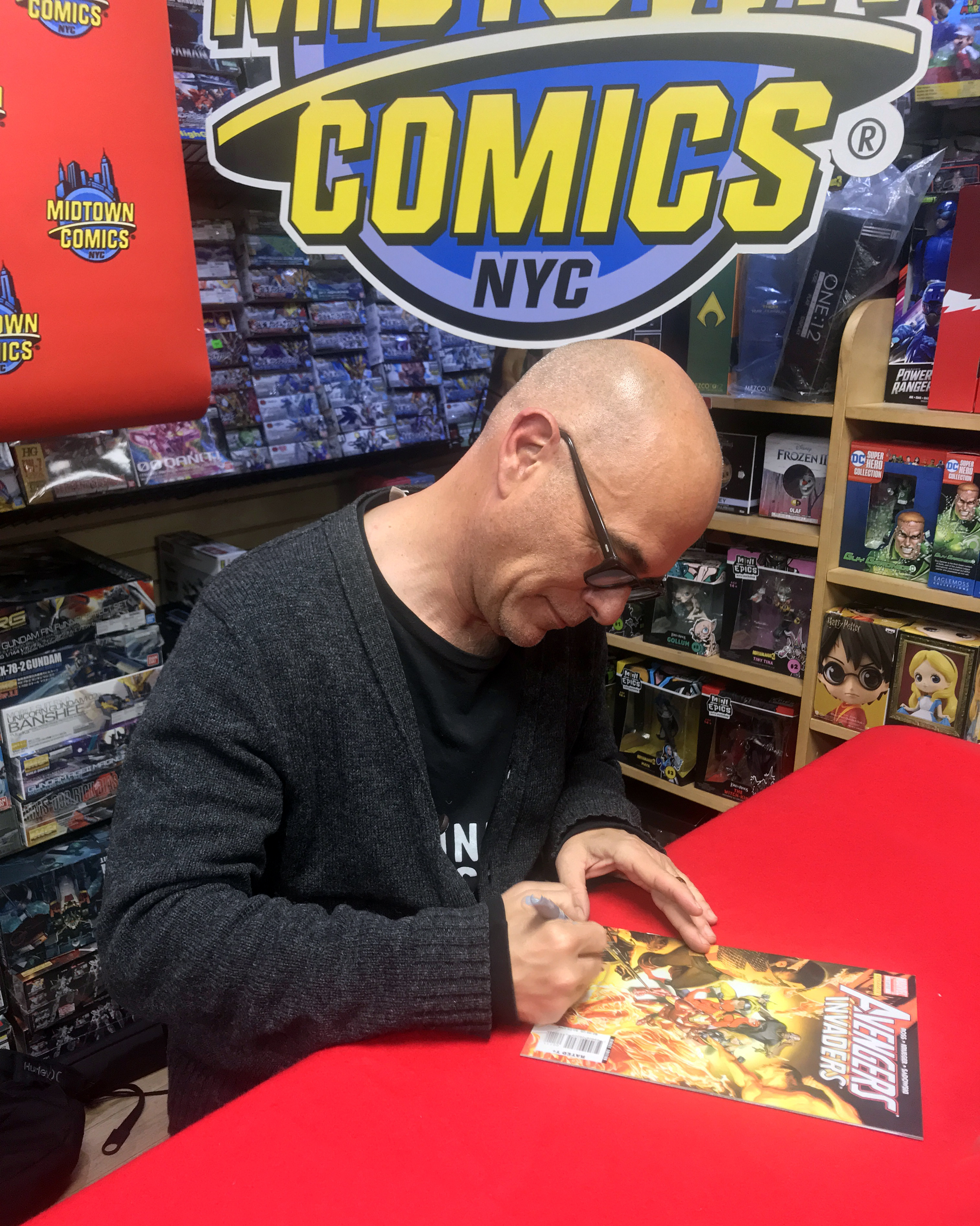
Writer Jim Krueger signing a copy of Avengers/Invaders at Midtown Comics Grand Central in Manhattan

The 2007 12-issue crossover series Avengers/Invaders saw the original WWII team of Captain America, Bucky, Namor, the Human Torch, and Toro brought to the present-day Marvel Universe by the Cosmic Cube, which had fallen into the hands of the demon D'Spayre. His use of it to draw on the grief generated by Captain America's death had unintentionally caused it to grant the wish of those who wished for his return.

Upon arriving in the present day, the Invaders battled the Thunderbolts and The Mighty Avengers, believing them to be Nazi agents. Eventually, the Invaders came to trust the Avengers teams (both Mighty and New versions) and agreed to go back to where they belonged. The teams collected the Cosmic Cube and an American soldier who traveled into the future with the Invaders. However, the soldier took it upon himself to steal the Cosmic Cube and save his dead friends in the past.

This triggers an alternative reality to emerge where most of the Avengers are wiped from time. Doctor Strange manages to send the Invaders and the surviving members of the Avengers into the past before being wiped from time himself.

In the past, the soldier raised his dead friends and healed a dying Union Jack. The soldier then attempted to destroy the Nazis with the Cosmic Cube, but lost it when he was attacked by Red Skull's henchmen. The Red Skull I later came into possession of the Cosmic Cube and transformed the world into one made in his own image. Elsewhere, the Invaders and the Avengers arrived in the past, but found that it had dramatically changed. The Avengers took up identities of Golden Age characters so that they could fit into the past without giving the Red Skull too much information about the future: Luke Cage as the Black Avenger, Iron Man as Electro, Ms. Marvel as Black Widow, Spider-Man as the Challenger, Spider-Woman as the Silver Scorpion, and Wolverine as Captain Terror. The Wasp uses her powers to stay hidden from sight. They end the Red Skull's reign of terror and restore the original timeline.

At the end of the series, Toro is revived after Bucky acquires the Cube. His story is continued in the eight-issue limited series The Torch, which deals with the resurrection of the original Human Torch. In the series, the two Golden Age heroes battle the Mad Thinker and the Inhuman Torch.

=== Invaders Now! ===
In September 2010, Marvel launched Invaders Now!, a miniseries starring Captain America (Bucky Barnes), the original Human Torch, Namor, Steve Rogers, Spitfire, and Toro. The Invaders are all reunited by the original Vision and Union Jack to face a resurfaced threat from World War II. This threat manifests as a disease that mutates those infected, causing horrible deformation, granting superhuman strength, and driving the victim insane with pain and rage. Those infected are driven to attack and thereby infect others. In World War II this pathogen was created by Arnim Zola, as his last project before suffering wounds which necessitated his consciousness being transferred into a robot. To contain the plague, the Invaders had to kill the entire population of a village in the Netherlands, including some who had been infected, but had not yet transformed. In this miniseries, the infection reappears in the modern era.

=== All-New Invaders ===
In 2014, Marvel launched a new series written by James Robinson and starring Captain America who is eventually replaced by Sam Wilson, Winter Soldier, the original Human Torch, and Namor. A Japanese heroine named Radiance (the granddaughter of Golden Girl) joins the team during the book's second arc, and the daughter of Iron Cross joins in issue # 10.

=== Invaders (vol. 3) ===
In January 2019, Marvel launched a new series written by Chip Zdarsky that saw original members Steve Rogers, the Winter Soldier, and the Human Torch reunite to stop Namor, who has become a global threat and mentally unstable.

== Collected editions ==
Title	Material collected	Year	ISBN
Invaders Classic Vol. 1	Invaders (vol. 1, 1975) #1–9, Giant-Size Invaders #1 (1975) and Marvel Premiere #29–30	July 2007	978-0785127062
Invaders Classic Vol. 2	Invaders (vol. 1, 1975) #10–21 and Annual #1 (1977)	July 2008	978-0785131205
Invaders Classic Vol. 3	Invaders (vol. 1, 1975) #22–23, 25–34	February 2009	978-0785137207
Invaders Classic Vol. 4	Invaders (vol. 1, 1975) #35–41, Invaders (vol. 2, 1993) #1–4	July 2010	978-0785145516
Invaders Classic: The Complete Collection Vol. 1	Giant-Size Invaders #1 (1975), Invaders (vol. 1, 1975) #1–22 & Annual #1 (1977), Avengers (vol. 1) #71 (1969), and Marvel Premiere #29–30 (1976)	July 2014	978-0785190578
Invaders Classic: The Complete Collection Vol. 2	Invaders (vol. 1, 1975) #23, 25-41, The Invaders (vol. 2, 1993) #1–4, Giant-Size Invaders #2 (2005), and What If (vol. 1, 1977) #4	December 2014	978-0785190585
Invaders Omnibus	Invaders (vol. 1, 1975) #1-23, 25-41, Annual (1977) #1; Marvel Premiere (1972) #29–30; Avengers (1963) #71; Invaders (vol. 2,1993) #1–4; What If? (vol. 1,1977) #4; material from Captain America Comics (1941) #22; Giant-Size Invaders (1975) #1–2;	November 2022	978-1302934750
Avengers: Once An Invader	Avengers (vol. 3) #82–84 and New Invaders #0 (2004), with Invaders Annual #1 (1977) and Avengers (vol. 1) #71 (1969)	November 2004	978-0785114819
New Invaders: To End All Wars	New Invaders #1–9	July 2005	978-0785114499
Avengers/Invaders	Avengers/Invaders #1–12	October 2009	978-0785129424
Invaders: The Eve of Destruction	Marvel Universe #1-7	August 2010	978-0785145523
Invaders Now!	Invaders Now! #1-5	April 2011	978-0785139126
All-New Invaders Vol. 1: Gods and Soldiers	All-New Invaders #1–5 and material from All-New Marvel Now Point One #1	August 2014	978-0785189145
All-New Invaders Vol. 2: Original Sin	All-New Invaders #6–10	December 2014	978-0785189152
All-New Invaders Vol. 3: The Martians are Coming	All-New Invaders #11–15	June 2015	978-0785192473
Invaders Vol. 1: War Ghost	Invaders (vol. 3, 2019) #1-6	August 2019	978-1302917494
Invaders Vol. 2: Dead in the Water	Invaders (vol. 3, 2019) #7-12	March 2020	978-1302917500
Always an Invader	Invaders (vol. 3, 2019) #1-12 and Namor: The Best Defense #1	February 2021	978-1302927356

== In other media ==
=== Television ===
- The Invaders appear in The Super Hero Squad Show episode "World War Witch!", consisting of Captain America, Bucky Barnes, the Human Torch, and Toro.
- The Invaders appear in flashbacks depicted in the Ultimate Spider-Man episode "S.H.I.E.L.D. Academy", consisting of Captain America, Bucky Barnes, Miss America, the Human Torch, and the Whizzer.

=== Film ===
The Invaders as a concept, hybridized with the Howling Commandos, appear in Captain America: The First Avenger. This version of the group is a hand-selected Special Forces infantry unit under Captain America's field command, and has Bucky Barnes and James Falsworth among its number.

=== Video games ===
- The Invaders appear in Captain America: Super Soldier, consisting of Bucky Barnes, Dum Dum Dugan, Union Jack, and Jim Morita.
- The Invaders appear in Marvel Strike Force, consisting of Nick Fury, Captain America, Bucky Barnes, Union Jack, and Orson Randall.

== See also ==
- Golden Age of Comic Books
- All-Winners Squad
- Avengers
- Crusaders (Marvel Comics)
- Liberty Legion
- Agents of Atlas
- Timely Comics
- Atlas Comics
- Marvel Comics
