= Human Torch (android) =

Marvel Comics fictional character

- The original Human Torch as depicted in The Marvels Project #2 (September 2009). Art by Steve Epting.

Publication information
- Publisher: Marvel Comics
- First appearance: Marvel Comics #1 (October 1939)
- Created by: Carl Burgos (writer and artist)

In-story information
- Alter ego: Jim Hammond
- Species: Android
- Team affiliations: Avengers; Invaders; All-Winners Squad; V-Battalion; West Coast Avengers; Heroes for Hire; Legion of the Unliving; Secret Avengers; The Descendants; S.H.I.E.L.D.
- Partnerships: Toro; Sun Girl
- Notable aliases: The Torch
- Abilities: Fire manipulation and resistance; Flight; Self-sustenance; Expert street fighter

The Human Torch, also known as Jim Hammond, is a superhero appearing in American comic books published by Marvel Comics. Created by writer and artist Carl Burgos, he first appeared in Marvel Comics #1 (October 1939), published by Marvel's predecessor, Timely Comics.

The Human Torch was an android created by scientist Phineas Horton, under the tutelage of Victor Timely. He possessed the ability to surround himself with fire and control flames. In his earliest appearances, he was portrayed as a science fiction monstrosity, but quickly became a hero and adopted a secret identity as a police officer for the New York City Police Department.

The Human Torch was one of Timely Comics' three signature characters, along with Captain America and Namor. Like many superheroes, the Human Torch fell into obscurity by the 1950s. In 1961, Stan Lee and Jack Kirby repurposed his name and powers for Johnny Storm, a member of the Fantastic Four who is a mutate (Note: In Marvel comics, the term "mutate" is used as a noun to designate characters that received superpowers from an external source, as opposed to Marvel's mutants.) instead of an android. Unlike Captain America and Namor, the Human Torch has had only a small presence in post-1950s comics and is closely associated with the Golden Age.

Paul Bettany played the role in the Marvel Cinematic Universe Disney+ miniseries VisionQuest (2026).

== Publication history ==
Following his debut in the hit Marvel Comics #1, the Human Torch proved popular enough that he soon became one of the first superheroes to headline a solo title. Through the 1940s, the Torch starred or was featured in Marvel Mystery Comics (the book's title beginning with issue #2), The Human Torch (premiering with issue #2, Fall 1940, having taken over the numbering of the defunct Red Raven Comics), and Captain America Comics #19, 21–67, 69, 76–77, as well as appearing in several issues of All Select Comics, All Winners Comics, and Young Allies Comics.

Seeing a natural "fire and water" theme, Timely was responsible for comic books' first major crossover, with a two-issue battle between the Human Torch and the Sub-Mariner that spanned Marvel Mystery Comics #8–9—telling the same story from the two characters' different perspectives.

Marvel Comics #1 (October 1939): The issue that first introduced the fictional character. Cover art by Frank R. Paul.

Marvel Mystery Comics #9 (July 1940): Fire vs. water in comics' first major crossover. Cover art by Bill Everett.

Marvel Mystery Comics ended its run with #92 (June 1949), and The Human Torch with #35 (March 1949), as superheroes in general had faded in popularity. Timely Comics publisher Martin Goodman—who by the early 1950s had transitioned the company to its next iteration, as Atlas Comics—attempted to revive superheroes with the anthology comic Young Men #24–28 (Dec. 1953 – June 1954), starring the Human Torch (art by Syd Shores and Dick Ayers, variously, with covers and initially some panels featuring the Torch redrawn by Burgos for style consistency), along with the Sub-Mariner and Captain America. The solo title The Human Torch returned for issues #36–38 (April–Aug. 1954) before again being canceled. The Torch also appeared in stories in the briefly revived Captain America Comics and Sub-Mariner Comics, and in the anthology Men's Adventures #28 (July 1954).

The original Human Torch debuted in present-day Marvel Comics continuity in Fantastic Four Annual #4 (Nov. 1966).

Human Torch appeared as a regular character in the 2010–2013 Secret Avengers series, from issue #23 (April 2012) through its final issue #37 (March 2013).

Starting in 2014, the Human Torch began appearing as a main character in the Marvel NOW! relaunch of The Invaders.

== Fictional character biography ==
=== Early life ===
The Human Torch escapes from his captivity in Timely Comics' Marvel Comics #1 (October 1939) by Carl Burgos.

Alex Ross' cover of Marvel Comics' Marvels #1 (Jan. 1994), which pays homage to Burgos's 1939 interior sequence depicting the Torch's debut

The Human Torch is an android created by Professor Phineas Horton in his lab in Brooklyn, New York for "scientific" purposes. At a press-conference, Horton's creation bursts into flames when exposed to oxygen. The android shows human-like sentience, personality, and awareness, but the spectators feared that he posed a safety threat. Public outcry leads to the Torch being sealed in concrete, though he escapes due to a crack that let oxygen seep in. The Torch inadvertently sets parts of New York City on fire and, after dealing with a mobster who intends to gain advantage of his abilities for fire insurance (and accidentally causing the mobster's death in an explosion), he eventually learns to control his flame, rebels against his creator, and vows to help humanity.

During World War II, the Human Torch joins other heroes as war broke out in Europe, and later in the Pacific, to fight the Axis powers. In his solo title's debut issue, he acquired a young partner, Thomas Raymond, the mutant son of two nuclear scientists whose exposure to radiation gave him the ability to control fire. (Note: This is the first issue, the series having taken over the numbering of the unrelated series Red Raven Comics.) The Human Torch also joins the New York City police force under the alias Jim Hammond. He would later drop the human name and serve the police force outright as the Human Torch, fighting villains and his off-and-on foe Namor.

The Torch and Namor join with Captain America and his partner Bucky as the core of the Invaders, fighting Nazis during World War II (in retcon stories that premiered in 1970s comics). The Torch, Namor, Captain America, and Bucky banded together with the Whizzer, and Miss America in post-war America in a subsequent super-team, the All-Winners Squad (the original Captain America and Bucky's membership were later retconned as having been the second Captain America and Bucky).

Sometime afterward, the Torch was placed in deactivation sleep in the Mojave Desert; an atomic bomb test awoke him. Learning that Toro had been captured by the Soviets and brainwashed, the Torch rescued his old partner and learned that the nuclear bomb's radiation had made his powers both much stronger and more unstable.

To keep Toro a young boy, the writers retconned the character slightly, claiming the Torch met him after World War II rather than at the beginning of the war. The revival lasted five issues. Later writers explained how fearing he would become a danger to those around him, the Torch flew back out into the desert and went nova, using up his energy reserve and effectively deactivating himself.

=== Reactivation and joining Avengers West Coast ===
John Byrne's cover to Avengers West Coast #50

In modern-day continuity, the Mad Thinker reactivates the Torch to have him battle the Fantastic Four, deactivating him when the Torch refuses to kill the heroes. In a storyline in the Avengers that dealt with the secret background of its android member, the Vision reveals that the Torch's body had been found by a renegade robot named Ultron 5, and modified to become the Vision, his mind wiped of past memories and his powers altered with the coerced help of Phineas Horton.

A later story by Roy Thomas in What If? #4 (Aug. 1977), planted the suggestion that the Vision was actually made from a second android created by Horton, named Adam II. This freed up the Human Torch for a possible revival. This was followed up by John Byrne, who had the Scarlet Witch revive the Torch in Avengers West Coast, seeking answers about her husband, the Vision, and to help Ann Raymond, wife of Tom Raymond. In these stories, it was determined that the Vision had been made by Ultron out of the Torch's spare parts, which explained their physical similarities. The Torch served the Avengers for many issues before losing his powers to save the former superheroine Spitfire in the 1990s series Namor. His powers gone, the Torch settled down with Ann Raymond.

He becomes the Chief of Security for Oracle, Inc., and would appear later as the CEO of Oracle, Inc., a company run by Namor. There he runs the mercenary team Heroes for Hire. During the time-travel adventure Avengers Forever, the Avengers discover that Immortus had used a device called the Forever Crystal to diverge the Torch's personal timeline while keeping the two outcomes concurrent. According to this explanation, the Human Torch is the Vision, but also continues to exist as himself.

After Oracle, Inc., is closed down and Heroes for Hire disbands, Hammond was soon asked to head Citizen V's V-Battalion upon the retirement of Roger Aubrey, the Destroyer. While on leave from the V-Battalion as field leader of the New Invaders, he became attached to Tara, a female android based on him, whom he came to regard as a daughter of sorts. He also renewed acquaintances with Spitfire, to the dismay of her beau, Union Jack (Joey Chapman). Tara is revealed to have been created by the Red Skull; overrides on her developing personality allowed the Invaders' enemies, the Axis Mundi, to use her as a weapon against the team. As Tara heats toward overload to kill the Invaders, the Torch channels her heat to prevent her meltdown. With his own systems then overloading, he flies high into the atmosphere and detonates.

The superhuman training camp created in the aftermath of "Civil War" is named Camp Hammond, in the Torch's honor. A statue of him on the camp's grounds bears the inscription "JIM HAMMOND, THE FIRST OF THE MARVELS: He showed us that heroes can be made". After Norman Osborn shuts down Camp Hammond, a mob tears down the statue.

=== The Torch ===
At the beginning of the "Dark Reign" storyline, Toro is captured by A.I.M. during an attempt to kill the Mad Thinker. Initial experimentation on Toro makes the Mad Thinker realize that he can reconstruct the Torch. A.I.M. steals the Torch's body from Arlington National Cemetery for experimentation.

After the Mad Thinker and A.I.M. spend months experimenting on the Torch's corpse and on the captive Toro they are able to resurrect the Torch, but his memories have disappeared. The Mad Thinker gains control of the Torch using Compound D, a synthetic molecule he adapted from the Torch's cells (H_{42}N_{2}C_{2}O_{6}), which he dubs "Horton cells". The Thinker uses the Torch as a weapon of mass destruction to destroy an Estonian town. An escape attempt by Toro damages the control mechanism and sets the Torch free. He returns to the A.I.M. carrier and begins murdering everyone in sight. The Mad Thinker reveals that he has managed to synthesize more of the Compound D, which can interact with living organisms and control them. As he teleports to safety, the compound pours into the ocean. It reaches an Atlantean settlement below, as it was being visited by Namor, and infects the population.

As the Compound D infection spreads through New York, the Torch battles an infected Namor and learns the nature of Compound D after Namor attempts to infect him. Namor is defeated and while Reed Richards can create an antidote, he cannot create enough of it fast enough. The Torch, Toro, and Johnny Storm team up and attack the Mad Thinker's base and the Thinker at first refuses to cooperate until the Torch threatens that he will scorch the Earth clean, starting with the Thinker. The Thinker realizes the Torch's memories are returning, and provides the antidote before teleporting away. The antidote is released and all infected victims are cured, but Reed Richards determines that the antidote breaks down all Horton cells, not just Compound D and that the Torch has only a few days before he is destroyed.

Toro attempts to investigate his past to learn of his parents' association with Professor Horton and learns that some Horton cell prototypes were stolen long ago. The Torch is visited by the Golden Age Vision who advises him to seek out Toro and aid him while he still can. Their quest takes them to an underground society called "New Berlin", where the population has been taught that the Axis powers won WW2; people who leave the underground city are incinerated. The leader of the colony lures the Mad Thinker to it and then holds him captive to coerce him to cooperate. It is revealed that all citizens of New Berlin are in fact androids created from the unstable prototype Horton cells and that the atmosphere of the colony is saturated with anti-combustion chemicals to keep the citizens intact; this also prevents Toro and the Torch from using their powers and they are captured. The Thinker stabilizes the New Berlin leader's weapon so that it can function without destroying itself. The Thinker also frees the Torch and Toro. Despite the Torch still dying from the Compound D antidote, he engages the Inhuman Torch in battle. The Inhuman Torch can absorb and manipulate all flame and siphons the flame from the Torch and Toro. The Torch manages to reignite himself and engages the Inhuman Torch in a final fight. By channeling his fire into a nova flame the Torch overload the Inhuman Torch, fusing it into an inert statue. A side effect of the Torch using the nova flame deactivates the enzyme in his body, saving his life. They bid farewell to New Berlin and the Golden Age Vision takes them back to New York. The Thinker reveals that the leader of "New Berlin" is himself an android. Unwilling to believe this, the leader attempts to leave New Berlin and is incinerated.

=== Secret Avengers ===
The Torch is offered membership in the Secret Avengers by Captain America after Hawkeye takes over as the team's leader. During his first mission with the group, the Secret Avengers travel to the Core, a subterranean city inhabited by advanced robots called Descendants. The Torch finds that he is worshiped by the Descendants, who respectfully refer to him as "Grandfather". During an encounter with a cyborg resembling the original Miss America, the Torch learns that the city was created by a man known as the Father, who created the Descendants back in the 1940s as part of a failed attempt to replicate Professor Horton's work. The Torch is badly damaged during the Avengers' escape from the Core, and is placed in stasis until his body can be repaired.

Black Ant later frees the Torch and teleports him back to the Core, where he is repaired by Father. There, the Torch sides with the Descendants, realizing that he never quite fit in with humans. He then leads an army of robots during a raid on New York City, with the goal of forcibly assimilating the human race through the use of nanotechnology. The Torch eventually realizes that he had been brainwashed, and destroys the Orb of Necromancy, the mystical artifact that granted life to the descendants. Although the human race is saved, the Descendants are all killed as a result. Distraught, the Torch quits the Avengers and flies off to parts unknown.

=== All-New Invaders ===
Months after his resignation from the Avengers, Hammond is shown living in a small town called Blaketon, now working as a mechanic. He is forced to abandon his new life after being attacked by a squadron of Kree soldiers, resuming his identity as the Human Torch once again. After being saved by the intervention of Captain America and the Winter Soldier, the Torch joins the newly reformed Invaders.

When the Fantastic Four are declared to be unfit guardians for the children of the Future Foundation, Hammond offers to take custody of the children to provide a guardian that the FF can trust who they know will do all that he can to reunite them with their parents, even threatening to leave S.H.I.E.L.D. if he is forced to make a choice between the agency and his promise to protect the children. During the final confrontation with the forces of Counter-Earth – unleashed by the Quiet Man as part of his plan against the Fantastic Four – Sleepwalker reveals that Hammond had a soul despite his artificial origin.

== Physiology ==
Earlier writers portrayed the Torch's body as anatomically identical to a human, but made out of synthetic material. Correspondingly, the Torch was shown to have human needs and weaknesses; he has been felled by drugs, poison gas, hypnotic and telepathic attacks in both Golden Age stories and the Invaders series from the 1970s. The Torch has a heart, lungs, circulatory and digestive systems, and has been shown sleeping, eating, and drinking on more than one occasion. This concept of a living, artificial human made of synthetic flesh and blood was unique in comics, as opposed to the more common theme of a mechanical automaton that only externally resembles a human being. In some depictions, the Human Torch's body is more mechanical.

The Mad Thinker has stated that the Torch's organs are composed of "Horton cells" – synthetic replicas of human cells using plastic and carbon polymers that duplicate the structures found in organic human cells. These cells can be grown in a culture, and are compatible with human and mutant physiology. Even in small clusters, they are capable of generating and storing a remarkable amount of power. While traveling inside the Human Torch in miniaturized form, Scott Lang temporarily gained a version of the Torch's powers after coming in contact with one of the cells that powers the Torch. Toro, the Torch's sidekick, is a mutant who was exposed to Horton cells as a child. The cells bonded to his nervous system and caused his powers to manifest as an exact duplicate of the Torch's.

The Human Torch's synthetic blood is a universal blood type and is shown to have restorative properties. A blood transfusion from the Torch gave Spitfire superhuman speed powers; a second transfusion decades later saved her life and restored her youth. A similar transfusion to Warrior Woman reversed much of her brain damage and restored her health and power.

== Powers and abilities ==
The Human Torch is a synthetic being designed and constructed of artificial materials. He has the capacity for creative intelligence, unlimited self-motivated activity, and human-like emotions. The Torch has the ability to envelop his body in fiery plasma without harm to himself and to utilize this heat energy for various effects, including flight, formation of fiery shapes, energy releases in the form of heat blasts, "nova flame bursts" (highest intensity heat blasts, similar to the heat-pulse of a nuclear warhead), and concussive force blasts. The Torch has the ability to control ambient heat energy in his immediate environment, which allows him to control flames not of his own generation, makes him immune to the effects of external heat and to absorb heat from other sources. The Torch's flame can be extinguished by lack of oxygen, or by smothering materials such as water, sand, fire-fighting foam, or heat-resistant blankets unless his flame is at such intensity that it immediately vaporizes such materials on contact.

While in flame form, the original Human Torch has engaged in hand-to-hand combat with Namor, the Sub-Mariner. He has also dug underground and through vessels like a human missile.

The upper limit of his resistance has been undefined over the years, having once walked out stronger from a nuclear blast, and on another time considered destroyed by another nuclear blast, this last one happening in the last issue of New Invaders.

The Torch was a member of the NYPD in the 1940s, and has police academy training. He has received some training in unarmed combat by Captain America, and is an expert in the combat use of his superhuman powers. The Torch is also an accomplished street fighter.

The Torch can live without oxygen, entering a stasis mode.

== Reception ==
In 2012, Hammond was ranked 28th in IGN's list of "The Top 50 Avengers".

== Other versions ==
Various alternate universe versions of the Human Torch have appeared throughout the character's publication history.

- The Human Lantern, an amalgamation of the Human Torch android and Alan Scott / Green Lantern, appears in the Amalgam Comics story Super-Soldier: Man of War.
- An ape version of the Human Torch called the Simian Torch appears in "Marvel Apes".
- An alternate universe version of the Human Torch, with elements of Vision, appears in the Ultimate Universe imprint.

== In other media ==
=== Marvel Cinematic Universe ===
- Jim Hammond, referred to as the "Synthetic Man", makes a cameo appearance in Captain America: The First Avenger (2011) as an exhibit at the 1943 Stark Expo. In 2026, the character received his first full appearance in the series VisionQuest, portrayed by Paul Bettany. The character was renamed J.I.M. (short for Joule Individual Machine). This version, built by Phineas Horton in the image of his late son James, is the first artificial intelligence whose source code serves as the basis for all future sentient AI creations such as J.A.R.V.I.S.. His classic abilities are explained as the result of his body overheating due to experiencing intense emotion, a flaw which would ultimately result in the death of both his creator and J.I.M. himself. His stored source code would later re-emerge as a construct within the depths of the Vision's digital mindscape.

=== Television ===
- Jim Hammond makes a cameo appearance in a flashback in the Fantastic Four episode "When Calls Galactus".
- Jim Hammond appears in The Super Hero Squad Show episode "World War Witch!", voiced by Jim Cummings. This version is a member of the Invaders

=== Video games ===
- Jim Hammond appears as an unlockable playable character in Lego Marvel's Avengers, voiced by Sam Riegel.
- Jim Hammond appears as a playable character in Marvel Puzzle Quest.

== Collected editions ==
Title	Material collected	Published date	ISBN
Marvel Masterworks Golden Age: Human Torch Vol. 1	Human Torch Comics #2–5A	October 26, 2005	978-0785116233
Marvel Masterworks Golden Age: Human Torch Vol. 2	Human Torch Comics #5B–8	December 27, 2007	978-0785122500
Marvel Masterworks Golden Age: Human Torch Vol. 3	Human Torch Comics #9–12	July 2010	978-0785133490
Decades: Marvel in the 40s - The Human Torch vs. the Sub-Mariner	Material from Marvel Mystery Comics #7–10; Human Torch Comics #5B,#8 and #10	January 29, 2019	978-1302916589
Timely's Greatest: The Golden Age Human Torch By Carl Burgos Omnibus	Marvel Comics #1; Marvel Mystery Comics #2–34, #83; Human Torch #2–7, #28; All-Winners Comics #1–4; Daring Mystery Comics #7; Captain America Comics #76; Young Men #24–28	December 10, 2019	978-1302919337
Sub-Mariner & The Original Human Torch	Saga of The Sub-Mariner #1–12 and Saga of the Original Human Torch #1–4.	September 17, 2014	978-0785190486
The Torch	The Torch #1–8	July 21, 2010	978-0785146315

== See also ==
- Ajax the Sun Man, a similar character published by Street & Smith
- The Fire Man, a similar character published by Centaur Publications
- Fiery Mask, a similar character published by Timely
- Pyroman, a similar character published by Nedor Comics
