= Marvel Premiere =

American comic book anthology series

- Cover for Marvel Premiere #1 (1972) featuring Adam Warlock. Art by Gil Kane and Dan Adkins

Publication information
- Publisher: Marvel Comics
- Format: Anthology
- Genre: Superhero
- Publication date: April 1972–August 1981
- No. of issues: 61

Creative team
- Written by: List: Steve Englehart (9-14), Ed Hannigan David Anthony Kraft (45-46), Stan Lee, David Michelinie Jim Salicrup Roger Stern (50), Roy Thomas (1-2, 15, 29-30, 33-37)
- Penciller: List: Jerry Bingham Frank Brunner John Byrne Gil Kane George Pérez Barry Windsor-Smith Tom Sutton
- Inker: List: Terry Austin Gene Day Frank Giacoia Al Gordon Bob Layton Ricardo Villamonte

Marvel Premiere is an American comic book anthology series that was published by Marvel Comics. In concept it was a tryout book, intended to determine if a character or concept could attract enough readers to justify launching their own series, though in its later years it was also often used as a dumping ground for stories which could not be published elsewhere. It ran for 61 issues from April 1972 to August 1981. Contrary to the title, the majority of the characters and concepts featured in Marvel Premiere had previously appeared in other comics.

== Publication history ==
Marvel Premiere was one of three tryout books proposed by Stan Lee after he transitioned from being Marvel Comics' writer and editor to its president and publisher, the others being Marvel Spotlight and Marvel Feature. The advantage of such tryout books was that they allowed the publisher to assess a feature's popularity without the marketing investment required to launch a new series, and without the blow to the publisher's image with readers if the new series immediately failed.

In addition to giving established characters a first shot at a starring role, Marvel Premiere introduced new characters and reintroduced characters who no longer had their own titles. Writer Roy Thomas and penciler Gil Kane revamped Him as the allegorical Messiah Adam Warlock in Marvel Premiere #1 (April 1972). Doctor Strange took over the series with issue #3 and writer Steve Englehart and artist Frank Brunner began a run on the character with issue #9. The two killed Dr. Strange's mentor, the Ancient One, and Strange became the new Sorcerer Supreme. Englehart and Brunner created a multi-issue storyline in which a sorcerer named Sise-Neg ("Genesis" spelled backward) goes back through history, collecting all magical energies, until he reaches the beginning of the universe, becomes all-powerful and creates it anew, leaving Strange to wonder whether this was, paradoxically, the original creation. Stan Lee, seeing the issue after publication, ordered Englehart and Brunner to print a retraction saying this was not God but "a" god, so as to avoid offending religious readers. The writer and artist concocted a letter from a fictitious minister praising the story, and mailed it to Marvel from Texas; Marvel unwittingly printed the letter, and dropped the retraction order. In 2010, Comics Bulletin ranked Englehart and Brunner's run on the "Doctor Strange" feature ninth on its list of the "Top 10 1970s Marvels".

Iron Fist first appeared in issue #15, written by Roy Thomas and drawn by Gil Kane. Other introductions include the Legion of Monsters, the Liberty Legion, Woodgod, the 3-D Man, and the second Ant-Man (Scott Lang). The series also featured the first comic book appearance of rock musician Alice Cooper.

Though Adam Warlock, Doctor Strange, and Iron Fist were all given their own series following their tryout in Marvel Premiere, many of the later features were never meant even as potential candidates for a series. In some cases, such as the Wonder Man story in issue #55 and the Star-Lord story in #61, the writer simply wanted to do a story featuring that character and there was not a more appropriate place for it to be published. Some features, such as Seeker 3000 (issue #41), were conceived specifically for Marvel Premiere but with no real plan for a series. Later in the title's run, Marvel Premiere was used to finish stories of characters who had lost their own series, including the Man-Wolf in issues #45–46 and the Black Panther in issues #51–53.

== Issues ==
Issue	Character(s)	Collected in
#1	Adam Warlock	Marvel Masterworks Warlock Vol. 1; Essential Warlock Vol 1 Adam Warlock Omnibus Vol 1
#2	Adam Warlock	Marvel Masterworks Warlock Vol. 1; Essential Warlock Vol 1 Adam Warlock Omnibus Vol 1
#3	Doctor Strange	Essential Doctor Strange Vol. 2; Doctor Strange Epic Collection Vol. 3: A Separate Reality; Marvel Masterworks Doctor Strange Vol. 4; The Best Marvel Stories by Stan Lee; Doctor Strange: Master of the Mystic Arts Omnibus Vol 1
#4	Doctor Strange	Essential Doctor Strange Vol. 2; Doctor Strange Epic Collection Vol. 3: A Separate Reality; Marvel Masterworks Doctor Strange Vol. 4; Doctor Strange: Master of the Mystic Arts Omnibus Vol 1
#5	Doctor Strange	Essential Doctor Strange Vol. 2; Doctor Strange Epic Collection Vol. 3: A Separate Reality; Marvel Masterworks Doctor Strange Vol. 4; Doctor Strange: Master of the Mystic Arts Omnibus Vol 1
#6	Doctor Strange	Essential Doctor Strange Vol. 2; Doctor Strange Epic Collection Vol. 3: A Separate Reality; Marvel Masterworks Doctor Strange Vol. 4; Doctor Strange: Master of the Mystic Arts Omnibus Vol 1
#7	Doctor Strange	Essential Doctor Strange Vol. 2; Doctor Strange Epic Collection Vol. 3: A Separate Reality; Marvel Masterworks Doctor Strange Vol. 4; Doctor Strange: Master of the Mystic Arts Omnibus Vol 1
#8	Doctor Strange	Essential Doctor Strange Vol. 2; Doctor Strange Epic Collection Vol. 3: A Separate Reality; Marvel Masterworks Doctor Strange Vol. 4; Doctor Strange: Master of the Mystic Arts Omnibus Vol 1
#9	Doctor Strange	Essential Doctor Strange Vol. 2; Doctor Strange Epic Collection Vol. 3: A Separate Reality; Marvel Masterworks Doctor Strange Vol. 5; Doctor Strange: Master of the Mystic Arts Omnibus Vol 1
#10	Doctor Strange	Essential Doctor Strange Vol. 2; Doctor Strange Epic Collection Vol. 3: A Separate Reality; Marvel Masterworks Doctor Strange Vol. 5; Doctor Strange: Master of the Mystic Arts Omnibus Vol 1
#11	Doctor Strange	Essential Doctor Strange Vol. 2; Doctor Strange Epic Collection Vol. 3: A Separate Reality; Marvel Masterworks Doctor Strange Vol. 5; Doctor Strange: Master of the Mystic Arts Omnibus Vol 1
#12	Doctor Strange	Essential Doctor Strange Vol. 2; Doctor Strange Epic Collection Vol. 3: A Separate Reality; Marvel Masterworks Doctor Strange Vol. 5; Doctor Strange: Master of the Mystic Arts Omnibus Vol 1
#13	Doctor Strange	Essential Doctor Strange Vol. 2; Doctor Strange Epic Collection Vol. 3: A Separate Reality; Marvel Masterworks Doctor Strange Vol. 5; Doctor Strange: Master of the Mystic Arts Omnibus Vol 1
#14	Doctor Strange	Essential Doctor Strange Vol. 2; Doctor Strange Epic Collection Vol. 3: A Separate Reality; Marvel Masterworks Doctor Strange Vol. 5; Doctor Strange: Master of the Mystic Arts Omnibus Vol 1
#15	Iron Fist	Essential Iron Fist Vol. 1; Marvel Masterworks Iron Fist Vol. 1; Iron Fist Epic Collection Vol. 1: The Fury of Iron Fist; Iron Fist Omnibus
#16	Iron Fist	Essential Iron Fist Vol. 1; Marvel Masterworks Iron Fist Vol. 1; Iron Fist Epic Collection Vol. 1: The Fury of Iron Fist; Iron Fist Omnibus
#17	Iron Fist	Essential Iron Fist Vol. 1; Marvel Masterworks Iron Fist Vol. 1; Iron Fist Epic Collection Vol. 1: The Fury of Iron Fist; Iron Fist Omnibus
#18	Iron Fist	Essential Iron Fist Vol. 1; Marvel Masterworks Iron Fist Vol. 1; Iron Fist Epic Collection Vol. 1: The Fury of Iron Fist; Iron Fist Omnibus
#19	Iron Fist	Essential Iron Fist Vol. 1; Marvel Masterworks Iron Fist Vol. 1; Iron Fist Epic Collection Vol. 1: The Fury of Iron Fist; Iron Fist Omnibus
#20	Iron Fist	Essential Iron Fist Vol. 1; Marvel Masterworks Iron Fist Vol. 1; Iron Fist Epic Collection Vol. 1: The Fury of Iron Fist; Iron Fist Omnibus
#21	Iron Fist	Essential Iron Fist Vol. 1; Marvel Masterworks Iron Fist Vol. 1; Iron Fist Epic Collection Vol. 1: The Fury of Iron Fist; Iron Fist Omnibus
#22	Iron Fist	Essential Iron Fist Vol. 1; Marvel Masterworks Iron Fist Vol. 1; Iron Fist Epic Collection Vol. 1: The Fury of Iron Fist; Iron Fist Omnibus
#23	Iron Fist	Essential Iron Fist Vol. 1; Marvel Masterworks Iron Fist Vol. 1; Iron Fist Epic Collection Vol. 1: The Fury of Iron Fist; Iron Fist Omnibus
#24	Iron Fist	Essential Iron Fist Vol. 1; Marvel Masterworks Iron Fist Vol. 1; Iron Fist Epic Collection Vol. 1: The Fury of Iron Fist; Iron Fist Omnibus
#25	Iron Fist	Essential Iron Fist Vol. 1; Marvel Masterworks Iron Fist Vol. 1; Iron Fist Epic Collection Vol. 1: The Fury of Iron Fist; Iron Fist Omnibus; Marvel Universe by John Byrne Omnibus Vol. 2
#26	Hercules	Thor Epic Collection Vol 7; Thor Omnibus Vol 5
#27	Satana	Essential Marvel Horror Vol 1; Marvel Horror Lives Again! Omnibus
#28	Legion of Monsters	Essential Werewolf by Night Vol. 2; Werewolf by Night Omnibus; Werewolf by Night: The Complete Collection Vol. 3; Morbius the Living Vampire Omnibus; Morbius Epic Collection Vol. 2; Marvel Masterworks Ghost Rider Vol. 3; Ghost Rider Epic Collection Vol 2: Salvation Run
#29	Liberty Legion	Invaders Classic: The Complete Collection; Invaders Omnibus; The Thing: Liberty Legion
#30	Liberty Legion	Invaders Classic: The Complete Collection; Invaders Omnibus; The Thing: Liberty Legion
#31	Woodgod	Marvel Masterworks Marvel Team-Up Vol. 6
#32	Monark Starstalker	Lost Marvels No. 2 Howard Chaykin Vol 1: Dominic Fortune, Monark Starstalker, and Phantom Eagle (Fantagraphics Press)
#33	Solomon Kane	The Chronicles of Solomon Kane; Solomon Kane: The Original Marvel Years Omnibus
#34	Solomon Kane	The Chronicles of Solomon Kane; Solomon Kane: The Original Marvel Years Omnibus
#35	3-D Man	Avengers Omnibus Vol 6
#36	3-D Man	Avengers Omnibus Vol 6
#37	3-D Man	Avengers Omnibus Vol 6
#38	Weirdworld	Weirdworld
#39	Torpedo	Marvel Masterworks Daredevil Vol. 13; Daredevil Epic Collection Vol. 7
#40	Torpedo	Marvel Masterworks Daredevil Vol. 13; Daredevil Epic Collection Vol. 7
#41	Seeker 3000	
#42	Tigra	Women of Marvel Omnibus; Tigra: The Complete Collection
#43	Paladin	Marvel Masterworks Daredevil; Daredevil Epic Collection Vol. 7
#44	Jack of Hearts	Marvel Masterworks Iron Man Vol. 13
#45	Man-Wolf	Man-Wolf: The Complete Collection
#46	Man-Wolf	Man-Wolf: The Complete Collection
#47	Ant-Man (Scott Lang)	Marvel Universe by John Byrne Omnibus Vol. 1; Marvel Masterworks Ant-Man/Giant-Man Vol. 3; Ant-Man/Giant-Man Epic Collection Vol. 2
#48	Ant-Man (Scott Lang)	Marvel Universe by John Byrne Omnibus Vol. 1; Marvel Masterworks Ant-Man/Giant-Man Vol. 3; Ant-Man/Giant-Man Epic Collection Vol. 2
#49	The Falcon	Marvel Masterworks The Avengers Vol. 18; Marvel Masterworks Captain America Vol. 13; Captain America Omnibus Vol. 5; Avengers Omnibus Vol 6; Captain America Epic Collection Vol 8: The Lazarus Conspiracy
#50	Alice Cooper	
#51	Black Panther	Marvel Masterworks Black Panther; Black Panther Epic Collection Vol. 2: Revenge of the Black Panther; Black Panther Omnibus: Revenge of the Black Panther
#52	Black Panther	Marvel Masterworks Black Panther; Black Panther Epic Collection Vol. 2: Revenge of the Black Panther; Black Panther Omnibus: Revenge of the Black Panther
#53	Black Panther	Marvel Masterworks Black Panther; Black Panther Epic Collection Vol. 2: Revenge of the Black Panther; Black Panther Omnibus: Revenge of the Black Panther
#54	Caleb Hammer	
#55	Wonder Man	Marvel Masterworks The Avengers Vol. 19; Wonder Man: The Early Years Omnibus; Avengers Epic Collection #11 - The Evil Reborn
#56	Dominic Fortune	Dominic Fortune: It Can Happen Here and Now
#57	Doctor Who (reprints from Marvel UK's Doctor Who Weekly)	
#58	Doctor Who (reprints from Marvel UK's Doctor Who Weekly)	
#59	Doctor Who (reprints from Marvel UK's Doctor Who Weekly)	Werewolf by Night: The Complete Collection Vol. 3 (backup)
#60	Doctor Who (reprints from Marvel UK's Doctor Who Weekly)	
#61	Star-Lord	Star-Lord: Guardian of the Galaxy; Guardians of the Galaxy: Solo Classic Omnibus

== Marvel Movie Premiere ==
The similarly-named Marvel Movie Premiere was a one-shot black-and-white magazine published by Marvel in September 1975. It featured an adaptation of The Land That Time Forgot by writer Marv Wolfman and artist Sonny Trinidad.

== See also ==
- Marvel Premiere Classic — a line of hardcovers collecting "classic" pre–2000 storylines in the Marvel and related Universes.
- Marvel Spotlight
