= Jeff Parker (comics) =

American comic book writer and artist

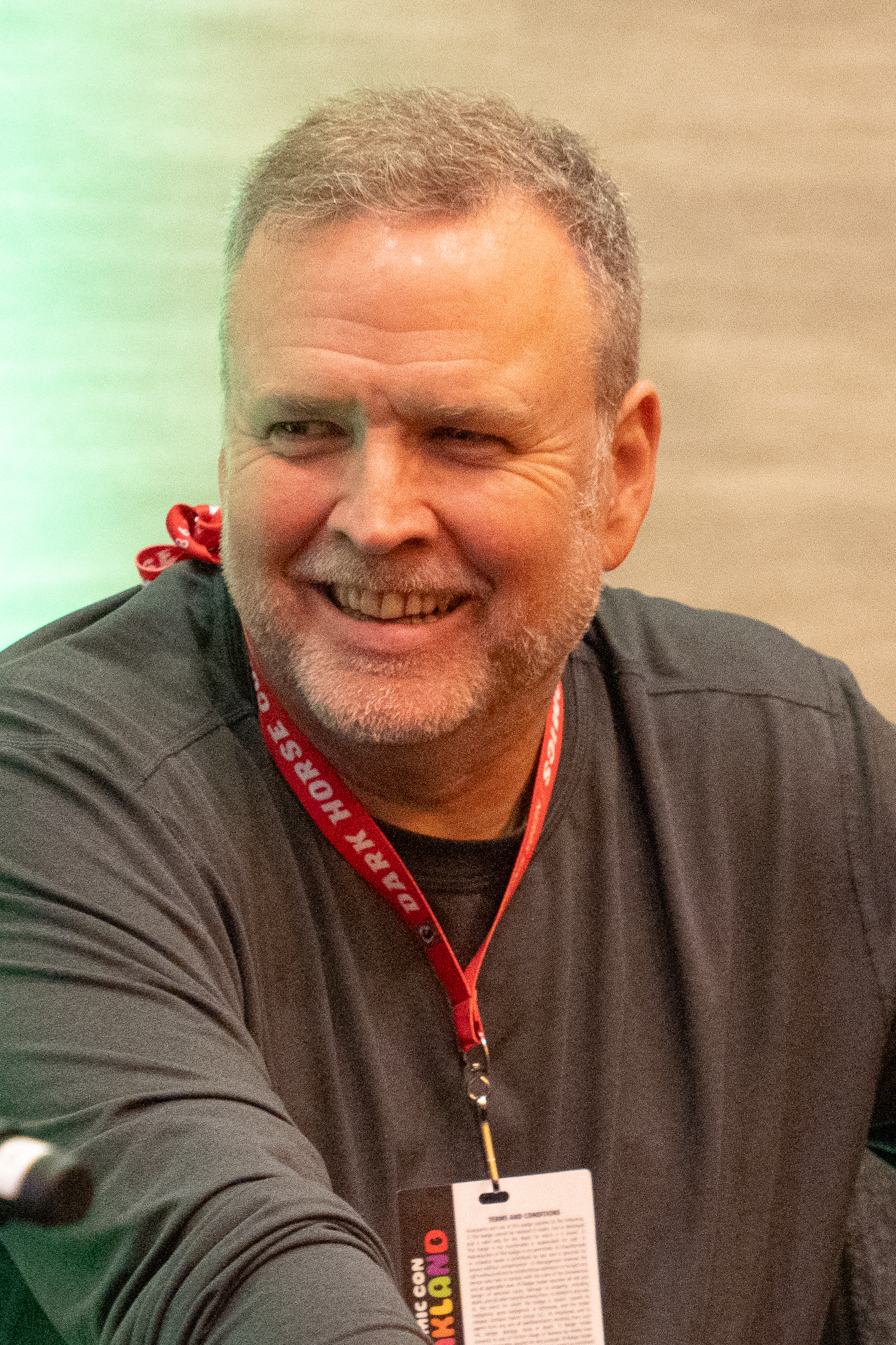
- Parker at Comic Con Oakland 2026
- Born: October 25, 1966 (age 60)
- Areas: Writer, penciller, inker, letterer, colorist
- Notable works: Agents of Atlas; Thunderbolts; Hulk; Batman '66; Aquaman; Future Quest

Jeff Parker (born October 25, 1966) is an American comic book writer and artist. He is a member of Helioscope Studio (formerly Periscope Studio, also known as Mercury Studio).

== Early life ==
Parker, a son of a grocery store owner, grew up in Burlington, North Carolina. His first exposure to comics came from reading the titles sold on the store's spinner racks, which included Dennis the Menace as well as various Archie and Harvey publications. After graduating from East Carolina University, where he majored in English Literature and Communications, Parker joined the Hillsbourough-based illustration studio Artamus Studios, whose other members over the years included Mike Wieringo, Richard Case, Scott Hampton, Dave Johnson, Craig Gilmore and Casey Jones.

== Career ==
Parker began his career in comics as an artist, inking various projects pencilled by his Artamus Studios colleagues and illustrating Solitaire for Malibu and Wonder Woman for DC Comics. In 1999, Parker moved to Los Angeles, where he worked as a storyboard artist on the Big Guy and Rusty the Boy Robot animated series while contributing art to a number of short stories featuring the Escapist and Buffy the Vampire Slayer for Dark Horse and various ancillary Batman characters for DC. Parker's first major work as a writer was the 2003 graphic novel The Interman, which he also pencilled, inked, lettered, colored and self-published under the Octopus Press name. In 2006, Parker announced a continuation of the story in the form of a 32-page release titled The Interman #0, to be illustrated by artist Tomm Coker, but the issue never came out.

In 2005, Parker began working as a writer for Marvel, penning short stories for various anthology titles as well as the Fantastic Four ongoing series for the all-ages imprint Marvel Adventures, followed by Marvel Adventures: The Avengers. In 2006, Parker and artist Leonard Kirk launched Agents of Atlas, a six-issue mini-series featuring the adventures of the eponymous superhero team composed of seldom-used Golden Age characters, such as Marvel Boy, Jimmy Woo and Namora. The mini-series was followed by several short stories and eventually the second volume of Agents of Atlas, launched in 2009. This iteration lasted for 11 issues, and was followed by two mini-series that saw Agents of Atlas crossover with Avengers and X-Men. In 2010, Parker and artist Gabriel Hardman launched another attempt at an ongoing series, titled simply Atlas, which ended after five issues. Between 2006 and 2009, Parker also wrote X-Men: First Class, another series aimed at younger audiences which retold the earliest adventures of X-Men.

Parker's other work of the period includes Walk-In and the second volume of Gamekeeper for Virgin Comics. In 2006, he revived the Octopus Press branding to publish Dear John, a book collecting 25 years of correspondence between comic book retailer John Hitchcock and the legendary artist Alex Toth. In 2009, Parker launched two creator-owned series: Mysterius the Unfathomable with artist Tom Fowler, published by DC Comics' Wildstorm imprint, and Underground with artist Steve Lieber, published by Image. Upon its completion, Underground was posted in its entirety on the "Comics and Cartoons" subsection of the imageboard website 4chan, which attracted the attention of Lieber, who joined the thread discussing the series and held an impromptu Q&A session with the anonymous users of the website. According to Parker and Lieber, this particular instance of comic book piracy led to a noticeable rise in sales of the series' collected edition. In 2021, Parker launched a Kickstarter campaign to fund his next creator-owned project, the graphic novel Blighter: Tracker of the Realm with art by Drew Moss.

In 2010, Parker took over the writing duties of the ongoing series Hulk, launched two years prior by Jeph Loeb. That same year, Parker became the writer of the long-running series Thunderbolts. After seeing the titular team through the company-wide crossover storyline "Siege", Parker revamped the title as part of the "Heroic Age" initiative which promised lighter tone for Marvel's superhero offerings. In 2013, Parker helmed the launch of the comic book continuation of the 1960s Batman television series for DC Comics in the form of the digital-first series Batman '66. The following year, he began writing the Aquaman ongoing series. 2016 saw the release of Future Quest, written by Parker and drawn by Evan Shaner, the flagship series of DC Comics' short-lived attempt at reimagining various Hanna-Barbera characters for the modern audiences. In 2021, Parker and artist Javier Pulido launched a new volume of the Ninjak series for Valiant, although Pulido was taken off the title after three issues for undisclosed reasons.

== Influences ==
Parker cites Alex Toth, Milton Caniff, Harvey Kurtzman, Carl Barks and Alan Moore among his influences.

== Bibliography ==
=== Early work ===
- Malibu:
  - Giant-Size Freex: "Quite Contrary" (as artist, written by Gerard Jones, co-feature in one-shot, 1994)
  - Solitaire #7–12 (as artist — with Stephen B. Jones (#7) and Ernie Steiner (#10); written by Gerard Jones, 1994)
- Negative Burn (anthology, Caliber):
  - "The Calculus Test" (with Craig Gilmore, as inker — on Casey Jones; written by Edward Martin III, in #13, 1994)
  - "Volt 2000" (script and art, in #36, 1996)
- Uther: The Half Dead King (with Craig Gilmore, as inker — on Bo Hampton; written by Dan Abnett, graphic novel, 64 pages, NBM Publishing, 1994, ISBN 1-56163-110-8)
- Heroic Tales (anthology, Lone Star Press):
  - "A Victim of Fate" (as letterer; written by Bill Willingham, drawn by Bobby Diaz, in #6, 1998)
  - "The Judgement of Atlas" (as artist, written by Bill Williams, in #8, 1998)
  - "Claws and Effect" (as artist — with Matt Reynolds and Bill Williams; written by Bill Williams, in #9, 1998)
  - "A Matter of the Heart" (as letterer; written by Bill Willingham, drawn by Bobby Diaz) and "Ape Company" (script and art, in #10, 2000)
- The Deception #1–3 (as artist, written by Bill Spangler, Image, 1999)
- GT Labs:
  - Fallout: J. Robert Oppenheimer, Leo Szilard, and the Political Science of the Atomic Bomb: "Work" (as artist — with Janine Johnston; a chapter of the graphic novel written by Jim Ottaviani, 240 pages, 2001, ISBN 0-9660106-3-9)
  - Suspended in Language (as artist — three 1-page strips written by Jim Ottaviani, graphic novel, 320 pages, 2004, ISBN 0-9660106-5-5)
- The Interman (script and art, graphic novel self-published as Octopus Press, 128 pages, 2003, ISBN 0-9725553-0-7)
- Vampirella Comics Magazine #3: "Hate Mail" (script and art, anthology, Harris, 2004)

==== Covers ====
- Ultraverse Double Feature (Malibu, 1995)
- Catwoman vol. 3 #11 (DC Comics, 2002)
- Shooting Star Anthology #2 (Shooting Star, 2003)
- Gone South #1 (as colorist — on Marc Sandroni, Atomic Basement Entertainment, 2003)
- Vampi: Vicious Rampage #1 (Anarchy Studios, 2005)
- Wyatt Earp: Dodge City #1 (Moonstone Books, 2005)

==== Pin-ups ====
- Battlezones: Dream Team^{2}: "Black Panther and Solitaire" (Malibu, 1996)
- Martian Manhunter Special: "Zatanna" (DC Comics, 1996)
- Xavier Institute Alumni Yearbook: "Class Portrait (2)" (Marvel, 1996)
- Heroic Tales #4: "Amazon Pin-up (1)" (Lone Star Press, 1997)
- JLA-Z #1: "Green Arrow" (DC Comics, 2003)
- Michael Chabon Presents: The Amazing Adventures of the Escapist #2: "The Escapist Pin-up (3)" (Dark Horse, 2004)

=== DC Comics ===
- Wonder Woman:
  - Wonder Woman vol. 2 #86–87 (as artist, written by William Messner-Loebs, 1994) collected in Wonder Woman: Ares Rising (tpb, 336 pages, 2021, ISBN 1-77950-748-8)
  - DC 100-Page Comic Giant: Wonder Woman #4: "Gundra the Great" (with Aneke, anthology, 2020) collected in Wonder Woman: Agent of Peace — Global Guardian (tpb, 224 pages, 2021, ISBN 1-77951-283-X)
- The Big Book of... (as artist, Paradox Press):
  - The Big Book of Weirdos: "Fyodor Mikhaylovich Dostoyevsky" (written by Carl Posey, anthology graphic novel, 224 pages, 1995, ISBN 1-56389-180-8)
  - The Big Book of Thugs: "The Bliss Bank Ring" (written by Joel Rose, anthology graphic novel, 192 pages, 1996, ISBN 1-56389-285-5)
  - The Big Book of the Unexplained: "The Crystal Skull Doom" (written by Doug Moench, anthology graphic novel, 192 pages, 1997, ISBN 1-56389-254-5)
  - The Big Book of Martyrs: "St. Callistus: The Slave Pope" (written by John Wagner, anthology graphic novel, 192 pages, 1997, ISBN 1-56389-360-6)
  - The Big Book of Grimm: "Fitcher's Bird" (written by Jonathan Vankin, anthology graphic novel, 192 pages, 1999, ISBN 1-56389-501-3)
  - The Big Book of the 70s: "Burt Reynolds" (written by Jonathan Vankin, anthology graphic novel, 192 pages, 2000, ISBN 1-56389-671-0)
  - The Big Book of Wild Women: "Eartha Kitt" (written by Susan Barrows, anthology graphic novel, unreleased, ISBN 1-56389-672-9)
- Justice League America Annual #9: "In 30 Seconds" (as artist, written by Gerard Jones, 1995)
- Robin vol. 2 #95–96 (as artist, written by Chuck Dixon, 2001–2002)
- Batgirl #38: "Testline" (as artist, written by Andersen Gabrych, 2003)
- Detective Comics (as artist):
  - "Exit Menu" (written by Jon Lewis, co-feature, solicited to appear in #805 but pulled from the issue before release)
  - "Regnum Defende" (written by Scott Beatty, co-feature in #806–807, 2005) collected in Batman Allies: Alfred Pennyworth (tpb, 248 pages, 2020, ISBN 1-4012-9894-X)
- Kyle XY: Breakthrough (with Steve Scott, free promotional one-shot given away at San Diego Comic-Con, 2007)
- Mysterius the Unfathomable #1–6 (with Tom Fowler, Wildstorm, 2009) collected as Mysterius the Unfathomable (tpb, 144 pages, 2010, ISBN 1-4012-2670-1)
- Masters of the Universe vol. 6 #6: "Orko" (with Chris Gugliotti, digital anthology, 2012) collected in He-Man and the Masters of the Universe Volume 2 (tpb, 144 pages, 2014, ISBN 1-4012-4312-6)
- Batman:
  - Batman: Legends of the Dark Knight vol. 2 #16: "Gotham Spirit" (with Gabriel Hardman, digital anthology, 2012) collected in Batman: Legends of the Dark Knight Volume 2 (tpb, 168 pages, 2014, ISBN 1-4012-4600-1)
  - DC 100-Page Comic Giant: Batman the Caped Crusader: "Harbor Invasion" (with Scott Kolins) and "Arkham Escape" (with Scott Koblish, anthology one-shot, 2020)
- Superman:
  - Adventures of Superman vol. 2 #1: "Violent Minds" (with Chris Samnee, digital anthology, 2013) collected in Adventures of Superman Volume 1 (tpb, 168 pages, 2014, ISBN 1-4012-4688-5)
  - Superman: Man of Tomorrow vol. 2 #9: "What Lives Inside" (with Sam Lotfi) and "Invasive Species" (with Mike McKone, digital anthology, 2020)
- Batman '66:
  - Batman '66 #1–15, 18–20, 22–28, 30–35, 40–45, 48–51, 54–55, 58–59, 62, 64–71 (with Jonathan Case (#1–3, 6, 10–11, 31–33, 71), Ty Templeton (#4–5), Joe Quinones (#7–8), Sandy Jarrell (#9, 12, 54–55), Rubén Procopio (#13–14, 22–23, 26), Colleen Coover (#15), Ted Naifeh (#18), Christopher Jones (#19–20), Craig Rousseau (#24–25, 41), David A. Williams (#27–28), Joëlle Jones (#30), Dario Brizuela (#34–35), Paul Rivoche (#40–41), Wilfredo Torres (#42–43), Brent Schoonover (#44–45, 58), Scott Kowalchuk (#48, 66–67), Richard Case (#49), Leonardo Romero (#50–51), Giancarlo Caracuzzo (#59), Lukas Ketner (#62 and 68), Jesse Hamm (#64–65) and Dean Haspiel (#69–70), digital, 2013–2015)
    - The series, first published in print between 2013 and 2016 as an ongoing series titled Batman '66, was collected as:
      - Volume 1 (collects #1–15 (or #1–5 of the print edition), hc, 176 pages, 2014, ISBN 1-4012-4721-0; tpb, 2014, ISBN 1-4012-4931-0)
      - Volume 2 (includes #18–20, 22–28 and 30 (or #6–10 of the print edition), hc, 176 pages, 2014, ISBN 1-4012-4932-9; tpb, 2015, ISBN 1-4012-5461-6)
      - Volume 3 (includes #31–35 and 40–45 (or #11–12, 14–16 of the print edition), hc, 168 pages, 2015, ISBN 1-4012-5462-4; tpb, 2012, ISBN 1-4012-5750-X)
      - Volume 4 (includes #48–51 and 54–55 (or #17–19 and 21 of the print edition), hc, 176 pages, 2015, ISBN 1-4012-5751-8; tpb, 2016, ISBN 1-4012-6104-3)
      - Volume 5 (includes #58–59, 62 and 64–71 (or #23 and 25–29 of the print edition), hc, 184 pages, 2016, ISBN 1-4012-6105-1; tpb, 2016, ISBN 1-4012-6483-2)
      - Omnibus (collects all 73 digital chapters (or 30 print issues) of the series, hc, 928 pages, 2018, ISBN 1-4012-8328-4)
  - Batman '66 Meets the Man from U.N.C.L.E. #1–12 (with David Hahn and Pasquale Qualano (#6, 8, 11), digital, 2015–2016)
    - The series was first published in print as a 6-issue limited series titled Batman '66 Meets the Man from U.N.C.L.E. (2016)
    - Collected as Batman '66 Meets the Man from U.N.C.L.E. (hc, 144 pages, 2016, ISBN 1-4012-6447-6; tpb, 2017, ISBN 1-4012-6864-1)
  - Batman '66 Meets Wonder Woman '77 #1–12 (co-written by Parker and Marc Andreyko, art by David Hahn, digital, 2016–2017)
    - The series was first published in print as a 6-issue limited series titled Batman '66 Meets Wonder Woman '77 (2017)
    - Collected as Batman '66 Meets Wonder Woman '77 (hc, 144 pages, 2017, ISBN 1-4012-7385-8; tpb, 2018, ISBN 1-4012-7803-5)
  - Archie Meets Batman '66 #1–6 (co-written by Parker and Michael Moreci, art by Dan Parent, 2018–2019) collected as Archie Meets Batman '66 (tpb, 144 pages, 2019, ISBN 1-68255-847-9)
  - Catwoman: 80th Anniversary 100-Page Super Spectacular: "The Catwoman of Earth" (with Jonathan Case, anthology one-shot, 2020) collected in Batman: 80 Years of the Bat Family (tpb, 400 pages, 2020, ISBN 1-77950-658-9)
- Aquaman:
  - Aquaman vol. 5 (with Paul Pelletier, Netho Diaz (#26–27), Álvaro Martínez (#30–31, Annual #2), Yvel Guichet (Annual #2) and Carlos Rodriguez (#34), 2014–2015) collected as:
    - Sea of Storms (collects #26–31 and Annual #2, hc, 208 pages, 2014, ISBN 1-4012-5039-4; tpb, 2015, ISBN 1-4012-5440-3)
    - Maelstrom (collects #32–40, hc, 240 pages, 2015, ISBN 1-4012-5441-1; tpb, 2016, ISBN 1-4012-6096-9)
      - Includes the "Graduation" short story (art by Álvaro Martínez) from Secret Origins vol. 3 #2 (anthology, 2014)
      - Includes "The Mission" short story (art by Daniel HDR) from Secret Origins vol. 3 #5 (anthology, 2014)
  - Aquaman: 80th Anniversary 100-Page Super Spectacular: "The Foxtail" (with Evan Shaner, anthology one-shot, 2021)
- Convergence:
  - Convergence: Hawkman #1–2 (with Tim Truman, 2015) collected in Convergence: Crisis Book One (tpb, 272 pages, 2015, ISBN 1-4012-5808-5)
  - Convergence: Shazam! #1–2 (with Evan Shaner, 2015) collected in Convergence: Infinite Earths Book Two (tpb, 272 pages, 2015, ISBN 1-4012-5838-7)
- Justice League United #11–16 (with Travel Foreman (#11–12, 16) and Paul Pelletier, 2015–2016)
  - Parker's short run on the series was preceded by a digital one-shot titled DC Sneak Peek: Justice League United (written by Parker, art by Travel Foreman, 2015)
  - A collected edition was solicited for a 2016 release but subsequently cancelled: Justice League United: Reunited (tpb, 160 pages, ISBN 1-4012-6334-8)
- Batman v Superman: Dawn of Justice — Playground Heroes (with R. B. Silva, promotional giveaway comic distributed for free with certain General Mills products, 2016)
- Future Quest (Hanna-Barbera Beyond):
  - Future Quest (with Evan Shaner, Steve Rude (#1 and 3), Jonathan Case (#2), Ron Randall, Aaron Lopresti (#3), Craig Rousseau (#5–6), Steve Lieber (#7) and Ariel Olivetti (#8), 2016–2017) collected as:
    - Volume 1 (collects #1–6, tpb, 160 pages, 2017, ISBN 1-4012-6807-2)
    - Volume 2 (collects #7–12, tpb, 144 pages, 2017, ISBN 1-4012-7391-2)
  - Adam Strange/Future Quest Special (co-written by Parker and Marc Andreyko, art by Steve Lieber, 2017) collected in DC Meets Hanna-Barbera Volume 1 (tpb, 168 pages, 2017, ISBN 1-4012-7604-0)
  - Future Quest Presents (with Ariel Olivetti (#1–3), Ron Randall (#4), Steve Lieber (#8) and Alain Mauricet (#12), 2017–2018) collected as:
    - Volume 1 (includes #1–3, tpb, 160 pages, 2018, ISBN 1-4012-7830-2)
    - Volume 2 (includes #4, 8, 12, tpb, 160 pages, 2018, ISBN 1-4012-8542-2)
- Batman and Harley Quinn #1–2 (with Craig Rousseau (#1) and Luciano Vecchio (#2), digital, 2017) collected in Batman and Harley Quinn (hc, 136 pages, 2018, ISBN 1-4012-7957-0; tpb, 2019, ISBN 1-4012-8899-5)
- Suicide Squad: Hell to Pay #1–12 (with Matthew Dow Smith, Agustín Padilla (#3), Stefano Raffaele (#4) and Cat Staggs (#5), digital, 2018) collected as Suicide Squad: Hell to Pay (tpb, 128 pages, 2019, ISBN 1-4012-8778-6)
- DC Meets Hanna-Barbera Volume 2 (tpb, 168 pages, 2018, ISBN 1-4012-8628-3) includes:
  - Black Lightning/Hong Kong Phooey Special: "Captain Caveman!" (with Scott Kolins, co-feature, Hanna-Barbera Beyond, 2018)
  - Aquaman/Jabberjaw Special: "Spectre of the Gun" (with Scott Kolins, co-feature, Hanna-Barbera Beyond, 2018)
- DC 100-Page Comic Giant: The Flash (anthology):
  - "Perfect World" (with Miguel Mendonça, in #1, 2019)
  - "Rational Thought" (with Ramon Villalobos, in #2, 2019)

=== Dark Horse Comics ===
- The Real Adventures of Jonny Quest Special #2: "An Ill Wind" (as artist, written by Kate Worley, promotional giveaway comic distributed for free with certain General Mills products, 1996)
- Hellboy: Weird Tales #3: "Family Story" (as colorist — on Steve Lieber; written by Sara Ryan, anthology, 2003) collected in Hellboy: Weird Tales Volume 1 (tpb, 128 pages, 2003, ISBN 1-56971-622-6)
- Michael Chabon Presents: The Amazing Adventures of the Escapist (anthology):
  - "Prison Break" (as colorist — on Steve Lieber; written by Kevin McCarthy, in #1, 2004) collected in The Amazing Adventures of the Escapist Volume 1 (tpb, 152 pages, 2004, ISBN 1-59307-171-X)
  - "The Escapist at the Royal Festival of Magic" (script and art, in #8, 2005)
- Buffy the Vampire Slayer:
  - Tales of the Vampires #4: "Dust Bowl" (as artist, written by Jane Espenson, anthology, 2004) collected in Tales of the Vampires (tpb, 144 pages, 2004, ISBN 1-56971-749-4)
  - Willow #1–5 (with Brian Ching; issues #3–5 are co-written by Parker and Christos Gage, 2012–2013) collected in Buffy the Vampire Slayer Season Nine Volume 2 (hc, 288 pages, 2015, ISBN 1-61655-716-8)
- MySpace Dark Horse Presents #28: "Blighter" (with Benjamin Dewey, digital anthology, 2009) collected in MySpace Dark Horse Presents Volume 5 (tpb, 168 pages, 2010, ISBN 1-59582-570-3)
- Creepy vol. 3 (anthology):
  - "Nineteen" (with Colleen Coover, in #8, 2012) collected in Creepy: At Death's Door (tpb, 176 pages, 2013, ISBN 1-59582-951-2)
  - "The Dance" (with Sandy Jarrell, in #21, 2015)

=== Marvel Comics ===
- Amazing Fantasy vol. 2 (anthology):
  - "Vampire by Night" (with Federica Manfredi, in #10–12, 2005)
  - "Heartbreak Kid!" (as artist, written by Roberto Aguirre-Sacasa, in #15, 2006)
- Marvel Monsters: Where Monsters Dwell: "The Shadow of Manoo" (with Russ Braun, anthology one-shot, 2005) collected in Marvel Monsters (hc, 224 pages, 2006, ISBN 0-7851-2141-2)
- Marvel Holiday Special 2005: "Yes, Virginia, There is a Santron" (with Reilly Brown, anthology, 2006) collected in Marvel Holiday Digest (tpb, 144 pages, 2006, ISBN 0-7851-2300-8)
- Marvel Romance Redux: Another Kind of Love (tpb, 176 pages, 2007, ISBN 0-7851-2090-4) includes:
  - Marvel Romance Redux: But I Thought He Loved Me!: "President Stripper" (over art by John Buscema, anthology one-shot, 2006)
    - The story is a reprint of "I Do My Thing... No Matter Whom It Hurts!" from My Love #2 (1969) with new humorous dialogue.
  - Marvel Romance Redux: Guys and Dolls: "The Diner Demon" (over art by Jim Starlin, anthology one-shot, 2006)
    - The story is a reprint of "One Day a Week" from My Love #20 (1972) with new humorous dialogue.
  - Marvel Romance Redux: Love is a Four-Letter Word: "Hot Alien Love" (over art by John Buscema, anthology one-shot, 2006)
    - The story is a reprint of "Another Kind of Love" from My Love #18 (1972) with new humorous dialogue.
- Untold Tales of the New Universe (tpb, 152 pages, 2006, ISBN 0-7851-2185-4) includes:
  - The New Avengers #16: "Kickin' it in Hell" (with Juan Santacruz, co-feature, 2006)
  - Untold Tales of the New Universe: Star Brand (with Javier Pulido, one-shot, 2006)
- Marvel Westerns: Western Legends: "The Man Called Hurricane" (with Tomm Coker, anthology one-shot, 2006) collected in Marvel Westerns (hc, 248 pages, 2006, ISBN 0-7851-2280-X)
- Agents of Atlas:
  - Agents of Atlas #1–6 (with Leonard Kirk, 2006–2007) collected as Agents of Atlas (hc, 256 pages, 2007, ISBN 0-7851-2712-7; tpb, 2009, ISBN 0-7851-2231-1)
  - Spider-Man Family #4: "The Producers" (with Leonard Kirk, anthology, 2007) collected in Spider-Man Family: Untold Team-Ups (digest-sized tpb, 104 pages, 2008, ISBN 0-7851-2627-9)
  - Secret Invasion: Who Do You Trust?: "The Resistance" (with Leonard Kirk, anthology one-shot, 2008) collected in Secret Invasion: Who Do You Trust? (tpb, 176 pages, 2009, ISBN 0-7851-3409-3)
  - Wolverine: Agent of Atlas #1–3 (with Benton Jew, digital, 2008–2009) collected in Wolverine: Prehistory (tpb, 504 pages, 2017, ISBN 1-302-90386-1)
  - Agents of Atlas vol. 2 (with Carlo Pagulayan (#1–2, 5, 8), Gabriel Hardman, Clayton Henry (#3–4), Dan Panosian (#9–11) and Paul Rivoche (#10), 2009–2010) collected as:
    - Dark Reign (collects #1–5, Wolverine: Agent of Atlas #1–3 and the short story from Secret Invasion: Who Do You Trust?, hc, 184 pages, 2009, ISBN 0-7851-3898-6; tpb, 2010, ISBN 0-7851-4126-X)
      - Includes "The Heist" short story (art by Carlo Pagulayan) from Dark Reign: New Nation (one-shot, 2009)
    - Turf Wars (collects #6–11, hc, 152 pages, 2010, ISBN 0-7851-4276-2; tpb, 2010, ISBN 0-7851-4031-X)
      - Includes the "Mr. Lao is Sleeping" short story (art by Carlo Pagulayan) from Agents of Atlas #0 (digital-only release, 2009)
  - Agents of Atlas vs. X-Men and the Avengers (hc, 168 pages, 2010, ISBN 0-7851-4772-1; tpb, 2010, ISBN 0-7851-4773-X) collects:
    - X-Men vs. Agents of Atlas #1–2 (with Carlo Pagulayan, Chris Samnee and Gabriel Hardman (#2), 2009–2010)
    - The Avengers vs. Atlas #1–4 (with Gabriel Hardman and Takeshi Miyazawa (#1), 2010)
  - Atlas: Return of the Three Dimensional Man (tpb, 176 pages, ISBN 0-7851-4696-2) collects:
    - Assault on New Olympus Prologue (one-shot) + The Incredible Hercules #138–141: "Godmarked" (with Gabriel Hardman, co-feature, 2010)
    - Enter the Heroic Age: "Heroes for the Ages" (with Gabriel Hardman and Giancarlo Caracuzzo, anthology one-shot, 2010)
    - Atlas #1–5 (with Gabriel Hardman and Ramon Rosanas, 2010)
  - Marvel Boy: The Uranian #1–3 (with Felix Ruiz, 2010) collected as Atlas: Marvel Boy — The Uranian (tpb, 168 pages, 2010, ISBN 0-7851-4771-3)
  - Namora: "Lost at Sea" (with Sara Pichelli, one-shot, 2010) collected in Mighty Marvel: Women of Marvel (tpb, 352 pages, 2011, ISBN 0-7851-4953-8)
  - Gorilla Man #1–3: "The Serpent and the Hawk" (with Giancarlo Caracuzzo, 2010) collected as Gorilla Man (tpb, 144 pages, 2010, ISBN 0-7851-4911-2)
  - Deadpool Team-Up #889 (with Steven Sanders, 2010) collected in Deadpool Team-Up: Special Relationship (hc, 192 pages, 2010, ISBN 0-7851-4711-X; tpb, 2011, ISBN 0-7851-4712-8)
  - Agents of Atlas vol. 3 #1: "Behind the Veil" (with Carlo Pagulayan, co-feature, 2019) collected in Agents of Atlas: Pandemonium (tpb, 120 pages, 2020, ISBN 1-302-92011-1)
- X-Men: First Class:
  - X-Men: First Class #1–8 (with Roger Cruz and Paul Smith (#6), 2006–2007) collected as X-Men: First Class — Tomorrow's Brightest (hc, 192 pages, 2007, ISBN 0-7851-2426-8; tpb, 2007, ISBN 0-7851-2427-6)
  - X-Men: First Class vol. 2 (with Roger Cruz, Colleen Coover, Julia Bax (#4 and 9), Eric Nguyen (#8), Craig Rousseau (#10), Nick Dragotta (#11), Karl Kesel (#15) and Patrick Scherberger (#16), 2007–2008) collected as:
    - Mutant Mayhem (collects #1–5, tpb, 152 pages, 2008, ISBN 0-7851-2781-X)
      - Includes X-Men: First Class Special (written by Parker, art by Kevin Nowlan, Nick Dragotta, Paul Smith and Colleen Coover, 2007)
    - Band of Brothers (collects #6–10, tpb, 120 pages, 2008, ISBN 0-7851-2599-X)
    - The Wonder Years (collects #11–16, tpb, 168 pages, 2009, ISBN 0-7851-3347-X)
      - Includes Giant-Size X-Men: First Class Special (written by Parker, art by Parker on the framing sequence and Dean Haspiel, David A. Williams, Nick Kilislian and Michael Cho on short stories, 2008)
  - X-Men: First Class — Finals #1–4 (with Roger Cruz, Colleen Coover and Amilcar Pinna (#3–4), 2009) collected as X-Men: First Class — Finals (tpb, 136 pages, 2009, ISBN 0-7851-3348-8)
  - Uncanny X-Men: First Class Giant-Size Special (co-written by Parker, Roger Langridge and Scott Gray, art by Craig Rousseau, David A. Williams, Dennis Calero, Sean Galloway, Joe Infurnari and Cameron Stewart, 2009)
- Scarlet Witch:
  - What If...? (featuring Avengers Disassembled): "What If the Scarlet Witch Hadn't Acted Alone?" (with Aaron Lopresti, one-shot, 2006) collected in What If: Event Horizon (tpb, 176 pages, 2007, ISBN 0-7851-2183-8)
  - Mystic Arcana: Scarlet Witch: "Birth of a Witch" (with Juan Santacruz, one-shot, 2007) collected in Mystic Arcana (hc, 264 pages, 2007, ISBN 0-7851-2719-4)
- Spider-Man and the Fantastic Four #1–4 (with Mike Wieringo, 2007) collected as Spider-Man and the Fantastic Four: Silver Rage (tpb, 104 pages, 2007, ISBN 0-7851-2673-2)
- Hulk:
  - The Incredible Hulk vol. 2 #111: "Warbound, Part 6" (co-written by Parker and Greg Pak, art by Leonard Kirk, 2007)
    - Collected in The Incredible Hercules: Smash of the Titans (hc, 296 pages, 2009, ISBN 0-7851-3968-0)
    - Collected in Hulk: World War Hulk Omnibus (hc, 1,304 pages, 2017, ISBN 1-302-90812-X)
  - Hulk: Raging Thunder (with Mitch Breitweiser, one-shot, 2008) collected in Giant-Size Hulk (hc, 168 pages, 2008, ISBN 0-7851-3669-X)
  - Monster-Size Hulk: "It's Alive! Alive!!!" (with Gabriel Hardman, anthology one-shot, 2008) collected in Savage Hulk: Down to the Crossroads (tpb, 128 pages, 2015, ISBN 0-7851-9727-3)
  - Incredible Hulks: Fall of the Hulks (hc, 512 pages, 2012, ISBN 0-7851-6211-9) includes:
    - Fall of the Hulks Alpha (with Paul Pelletier, one-shot, 2009) also collected in The Incredible Hulk: Fall of the Hulks (hc, 120 pages, 2010, ISBN 0-7851-4252-5; tpb, 2010, ISBN 0-7851-4414-5)
    - Fall of the Hulks: Red Hulk #1–4 (with Carlos Rodriguez and Fernando Blanco (#3–4), 2010) also collected as Fall of the Hulks: Red Hulk (tpb, 128 pages, 2010, ISBN 0-7851-4795-0)
  - Fall of the Hulks: The Savage She-Hulks #1–3 (with Salvador Espin and Jonboy Meyers (#2–3), 2010) collected as Fall of the Hulks: The Savage She-Hulks (tpb, 144 pages, 2010, ISBN 0-7851-4796-9)
  - Incredible Hulks: World War Hulks (hc, 448 pages, 2012, ISBN 0-7851-6215-1) includes:
    - Hulked Out Heroes #1–2 (with Humberto Ramos, 2010)
    - World War Hulks: "Game Face" (with Zach Howard) and "Stupid Champagne Room!" (with Ig Guara, anthology one-shot, 2010)
  - Hulk (with Gabriel Hardman, Mark Robinson (#25–27), Ben Oliver (#28–29), Ed McGuinness (#30), Tim Seeley (#30–31), Carlo Pagulayan (#34–35, 50–52), Patrick Zircher (#36, 42–46), Elena Casagrande (#37–38, 47–49) and Dale Eaglesham (#53–57), 2010–2012) collected as:
    - Red Hulk: Scorched Earth (collects #25–30, tpb, 184 pages, 2011, ISBN 0-7851-4896-5)
    - Red Hulk: Planet Red Hulk (collects #30.1, 31–35, tpb, 176 pages, 2011, ISBN 0-7851-5578-3)
    - Fear Itself: Hulk (collects #37–41, hc, 112 pages, 2012, ISBN 0-7851-5579-1; tpb, 176 pages, 2012, ISBN 0-7851-5580-5)
    - Red Hulk: Hulk of Arabia (collects #42–46, tpb, 112 pages, 2012, ISBN 0-7851-6095-7)
    - Red Hulk: Haunted (collects #47–52, tpb, 144 pages, 2012, ISBN 0-7851-6099-X)
    - Red Hulk: Mayan Rule (collects #53–57, tpb, 120 pages, 2012, ISBN 0-7851-6097-3)
  - Incredible Hulks #618: "S.M.A.S.H. Files: How I Became the Bomb" (with Yacine Elghorri, co-feature, 2011) collected in Chaos War: Incredible Hulks (tpb, 128 pages, 2011, ISBN 0-7851-5157-5)
  - Venom vol. 2 #13.4: "Circle of Four, Part 4" (with Julian Totino Tedesco, 2012) collected in Venom by Rick Remender: The Complete Collection Volume 2 (tpb, 344 pages, 2015, ISBN 0-7851-9353-7)
  - Red She-Hulk (with Carlo Pagulayan, Wellinton Alves, Ray-Anthony Height (#65), Joe Bennett (#66) and Pat Olliffe (#66–67), 2012–2013) collected as:
    - Hell Hath No Fury (collects #58–62, tpb, 120 pages, 2013, ISBN 0-7851-6531-2)
    - Route 616 (collects #63–67, tpb, 120 pages, 2013, ISBN 0-7851-8446-5)
  - Indestructible Hulk Annual: "Journey into Science" (with Mahmud Asrar, 2014) collected in Indestructible Hulk by Mark Waid: The Complete Collection (tpb, 504 pages, 2017, ISBN 1-302-90800-6)
- What If...? Spider-Man vs. Wolverine: "The Spider Who Went into the Cold" (co-written by Parker and Paul Tobin, art by Clayton Henry, one-shot, 2008) collected in What If: Civil War (tpb, 168 pages, 2008, ISBN 0-7851-3036-5)
- Hero Initiative: Mike Wieringo (with Mike Wieringo, Art Adams, Paul Renaud, Stuart Immonen, Cully Hamner, Alan Davis, Casey Jones, David A. Williams, Sanford Greene, Humberto Ramos, Skottie Young, Mike Allred and Barry Kitson, one-shot, 2008)
- The Age of the Sentry! #1–6 (with Nick Dragotta and Ramon Rosanas, 2008–2009)
  - A collected edition was solicited for a 2009 release but subsequently cancelled: Sentry: The Age of the Sentry! (tpb, 152 pages, ISBN 0-7851-3520-0)
- Exiles vol. 2 #1–6 (with Salvador Espin and Casey Jones (#3–5), 2009) collected as Exiles: Point of No Return (tpb, 176 pages, 2010, ISBN 0-7851-4044-1)
- Dark Reign: The Hood #1–5 (with Kyle Hotz, 2009) collected as Dark Reign: The Hood (tpb, 136 pages, 2010, ISBN 0-7851-4163-4)
- Spider-Man: 1602 #1–5 (with Ramon Rosanas, 2009–2010) collected as Marvel 1602: Spider-Man (hc, 120 pages, 2010, ISBN 0-7851-4603-2; tpb, 2010, ISBN 0-7851-2817-4)
- Thunderbolts (with Miguel Sepulveda, Sergio Arino (#140), Wellinton Alves (#142), Kev Walker, Declan Shalvey and Matthew Southworth (#162 and 168), 2010–2012) collected as:
  - Siege (collects #138–143, hc, 144 pages, 2010, ISBN 0-7851-4373-4; tpb, 2011, ISBN 0-7851-4374-2)
  - Cage (collects #144–147, hc, 112 pages, 2010, ISBN 0-7851-4774-8; tpb, 2011, ISBN 0-7851-4775-6)
    - Includes the "Top Dog" short story (art by Kev Walker) from Enter the Heroic Age (one-shot, 2010)
  - Shadowland (collects #148–151, hc, 144 pages, 2011, ISBN 0-7851-5218-0; tpb, 2011, ISBN 0-7851-5219-9)
  - Violent Rejection (collects #152–157, tpb, 152 pages, 2011, ISBN 0-7851-5221-0)
  - Fear Itself (collects #158–162, hc, 136 pages, 2012, ISBN 0-7851-5798-0; tpb, 2012, ISBN 0-7851-5223-7)
  - The Great Escape (collects #163–168 and 163.1, tpb, 144 pages, 2012, ISBN 0-7851-6170-8)
  - Like Lightning (collects #169–174, tpb, 136 pages, 2012, ISBN 0-7851-6171-6)
- Fear Itself: The Worthy #2: "I'm the Juggernaut!!!" (with Declan Shalvey, digital minicomic, 2011)
  - First published in print as a feature in Fear Itself: The Worthy (one-shot, 2011)
  - Collected in Fear Itself: Spider-Man (hc, 136 pages, 2012, ISBN 0-7851-5804-9; tpb, 2012, ISBN 0-7851-5703-4)
- Harley-Davidson/The Avengers #1–2: "Heroes Arise" (with Manuel García (#1) and Pow Rodrix (#2), digital, 2012)
- Dark Avengers (with Declan Shalvey (#175, 177–178), Kev Walker (#176–179), Gabriel Hernández Walta (#179) and Neil Edwards, 2012–2013) collected as:
  - The End is the Beginning (collects #175–183, tpb, 192 pages, 2013, ISBN 0-7851-6172-4)
  - Masters of Evil (collects #184–190, tpb, 160 pages, 2013, ISBN 0-7851-6847-8)
- Fantastic Four #645: "Time and Tide" (with Pascal Campion, co-feature, 2015) collected in Fantastic Four: The End is Fourever (tpb, 144 pages, 2015, ISBN 0-7851-9744-3)

==== Marvel Adventures ====
- Marvel Adventures Spider-Man #4: "Goom Got Game!" (with Patrick Scherberger, 2005) collected in Marvel Adventures Spider-Man Volume 1 (hc, 192 pages, 2006, ISBN 0-7851-2432-2)
- Marvel Adventures Fantastic Four (with Carlo Pagulayan (#2–3, 9), Juan Santacruz (#4 and 12) and Manuel García; issue #2 is co-written by Parker and Akira Yoshida, 2005–2006) collected as:
  - Family of Heroes (includes #2–4, tpb, 96 pages, 2005, ISBN 0-7851-1858-6)
  - Fantastic Voyages (collects #5–8, tpb, 96 pages, 2006, ISBN 0-7851-1859-4)
  - World's Greatest (collects #9–12, tpb, 96 pages, 2006, ISBN 0-7851-2002-5)
- Marvel Adventures: The Avengers (with Manuel García (#1–4), Juan Santacruz (#9–12), Leonard Kirk (#13–14), CAFU (#15), Ronan Cliquet + Steve Scott (#16), Ig Guara and Rodney Buchemi (#28), 2006–2008) collected as:
  - Heroes Assembled (collects #1–4, tpb, 96 pages, 2006, ISBN 0-7851-2306-7)
  - Bizarre Adventures (collects #9–12, tpb, 96 pages, 2007, ISBN 0-7851-2308-3)
  - The Dream Team (collects #13–15, tpb, 96 pages, 2007, ISBN 0-7851-2529-9)
    - Includes the Marvel Adventures: Giant-Size Avengers one-shot (written by Parker, art by Leonard Kirk, 2007)
  - Some Assembling Required (includes #16, tpb, 96 pages, 2008, ISBN 0-7851-2530-2)
  - Weirder and Wilder (collects #24–27, tpb, 96 pages, 2008, ISBN 0-7851-2983-9)
  - The New Recruits (includes #28–29, tpb, 96 pages, 2009, ISBN 0-7851-2984-7)
- Marvel Adventures Iron Man Special Edition (with Francisco Ruiz Velasco, free promotional giveaway one-shot, 2008)
- Free Comic Book Day 2008: Marvel Adventures (co-written by Parker and Paul Tobin, art by Alvin Lee, one-shot, 2008) collected in Marvel Adventures Iron Man: Armored Avenger (tpb, 96 pages, 2008, ISBN 0-7851-3421-2)

=== Dynamite Entertainment ===
- Kings Watch #1–5 (with Marc Laming, 2013–2014) collected as Kings Watch (tpb, 128 pages, 2014, ISBN 1-60690-486-8)
- Flash Gordon:
  - Flash Gordon Omnibus: The Man from Earth (tpb, 272 pages, 2015, ISBN 1-60690-599-6) collects:
    - Flash Gordon vol. 5 #1–8 (with Evan Shaner and Richard Case (#5), 2014–2015)
    - Flash Gordon Annual 2014: "Good at Anything (as Long as It's Not Work)" (co-written by Parker and Nathan Cosby, art by Craig Rousseau, co-feature, 2014)
  - Flash Gordon: Kings Cross #1–5 (with Jesse Hamm, 2016–2017) collected as Flash Gordon: Kings Cross (tpb, 120 pages, 2017, ISBN 1-5241-0359-4)
- James Bond: Origin (with Bob Quinn (#1–6) and Ibrahim Moustafa (#7–12), 2018–2019) collected as:
  - Volume 1 (collects #1–6, hc, 160 pages, 2019, ISBN 1-5241-0976-2)
  - Volume 2 (collects #7–12, hc, 144 pages, 2020, ISBN 1-5241-1268-2)
- John Carter of Mars:
  - Warlord of Mars Attacks #1–5 (with Dean Kotz, 2019) collected as Warlord of Mars Attacks (tpb, 120 pages, 2022, ISBN 1-5241-1953-9)
  - Dejah Thoris: Winter's End: "Family Legend" (with Jonathan Lau) and "Afterlife on Mars" (with Jordi Pérez, anthology one-shot, 2021)
- Red Sonja: Black, White, Red #2: "Edible" (with Natalie Nourigat, anthology, 2021) collected in Red Sonja: Black, White, Red Volume 1 (hc, 136 pages, 2022, ISBN 1-5241-2140-1)
- Vampirella: Mindwarp #1–5 (with Benjamin Dewey, 2022–2023) collected as Vampirella: Mindwarp (tpb, 136 pages, 2023, ISBN 1-5241-2416-8)
- Cat-Man and Kitten (with Joseph Cooper, one-shot, 2022)

=== Other publishers ===
- Image:
  - Four Letter Worlds: "Bear" (script and art, anthology graphic novel, 144 pages, 2005, ISBN 1-58240-439-9)
  - Underground #1–5 (with Steve Lieber, 2009–2010) collected as Underground (tpb, 128 pages, 2010, ISBN 1-60706-266-6)
  - Liberty Annual '14: "Little Star" (with Tom Fowler, anthology, 2014)
- Virgin:
  - Walk-In #1–6 (script by Parker based on the concept by Dave Stewart, art by Ashish Padlekar, 2006–2007) collected as Walk-In (tpb, 144 pages, 2007, ISBN 1-934413-05-4)
  - Gamekeeper vol. 2 #1–5 (with Ron Randall (#1–2) and Ron Chan, 2008) collected in Gamekeeper Omnibus (tpb, 256 pages, Dynamite, 2011, ISBN 1-60690-177-X)
- Archaia Studios:
  - Immortals: Gods and Heroes: "The Old Man's Warning" (with Phil Hester, anthology graphic novel, 112 pages, 2011, ISBN 1-936393-32-8)
  - Jim Henson's The Storyteller: "Old Fire Dragaman" (with Tom Fowler, anthology graphic novel, hc, 120 pages, 2011, ISBN 1-936393-24-7; sc, 2013, ISBN 1-936393-98-0)
- Bucko (with Erika Moen, a webcomic serialized at buckocomic.com between February 1, 2011 and January 31, 2012) collected in print as Bucko (hc, 136 pages, Dark Horse, 2012, ISBN 1-59582-973-3)
- Planet of the Apes vol. 4 Annual: "Old New World" (with Benjamin Dewey, co-feature, Boom! Studios, 2012) collected in Planet of the Apes: The Half Man (tpb, 144 pages, 2013, ISBN 1-61398-130-9)
- IDW Publishing:
  - Angry Birds:
    - Angry Birds Comics (anthology):
      - Welcome to the Flock (hc, 96 pages, 2014, ISBN 1-63140-090-8) includes:
        - "Bomb Hiccups" (with Paco Rodríques) and "Propiganda" (with César Ferioli, in #1, 2014)
        - "Piggyland" (with Paco Rodríques, in #2, 2014)
        - "Static Cling" (with Stefano Intini, in #3, 2014)
      - Sky High (hc, 80 pages, 2015, ISBN 1-63140-368-0) includes:
        - "Earplugs" (with Oscar Martín, in #10, 2015)
    - Angry Birds Comics: Halloween Comicfest Special: "Staring Contest" (with Ivan Portier, co-feature, 2014)
    - Super Angry Birds #1 and 3 (of 4) (with Ron Randall, 2015) collected in Super Angry Birds (tpb, 104 pages, 2015, ISBN 1-63140-549-7)
    - Angry Birds: Big Movie Eggstravaganza (anthology graphic novel, 80 pages, 2016, ISBN 1-63140-568-3) featured four short stories by Parker:
      - "Chuck Luck!" (with César Ferioli)
      - "Life-Guards" (with Valentin Doménech)
      - "Heat Wave" (with Thomas Cabellic)
      - "Hypno Stella" (with Jean-Michel Boesch)
  - Love is Love (script and art, untitled one-page story featuring Poison Ivy, anthology graphic novel, 144 pages, 2016, ISBN 1-63140-939-5)
- Oni Press:
  - Meteor Men (with Sandy Jarrell, graphic novel, 128 pages, 2014, ISBN 1-62010-151-3)
  - Aggretsuko #4 (cover illustration, 2020)
- Ninjak (Valiant):
  - Ninjak vol. 4 #1–4 (with Javier Pulido and Beni Lobel (#4), 2021) collected as Ninjak Book One (tpb, 144 pages, 2022, ISBN 1-68215-410-6)
  - Valiant FCBD 2022: "Life on the Run" (with Mike Norton, co-feature in one-shot, 2022)
  - Ninjak: Superkillers #1–4 (with Mike Norton, 2023)

Preceded by Chris Claremont	Exiles writer 2009	Succeeded by Saladin Ahmed
Preceded by Andy Diggle	Thunderbolts writer 2010–2012	Succeeded by Daniel Way
Preceded by Jeph Loeb	(Red) Hulk writer 2010–2012	Succeeded by n/a
Preceded by Brian Michael Bendis	Dark Avengers writer 2012–2013	Succeeded by n/a
Preceded by Geoff Johns	Aquaman writer 2014–2015	Succeeded by Cullen Bunn
Preceded by Christos Gage (Ninja-K)	Ninjak writer 2021–present	Succeeded by current
