= Julia Bax =

Brazilian comics artist

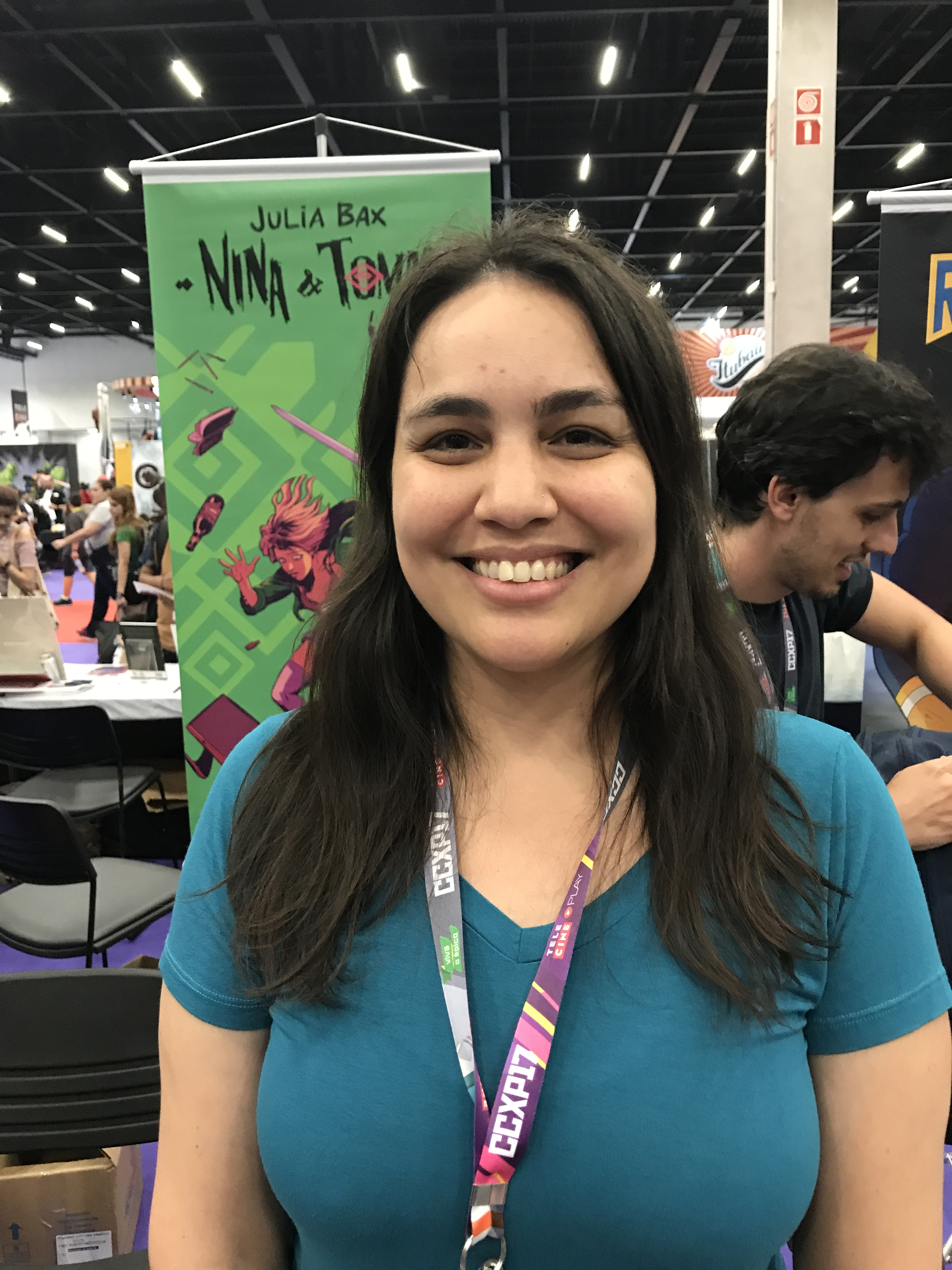
- Julia Bax in 2017 Comic Con Experience.
- Born: 26 February 1981; Belém
- Occupation: Comics artist
- Notable work: Princesse Caraboo
- Awards: Troféu HQ Mix for best new talent (2006, Kaos!, Quebra-Queixo)
- Website: www.juliabax.com

Julia Nascimento Bacellar, known as Julia Bax (Belém, February 26, 1981), is a Brazilian comics artist. Her first comic book work was published in the Brazilian magazine Kaos!, recommended by Roger Cruz (who was her professor in the comic anatomy course at Quanta Academia de Artes). After that, she made the drawings of a 12-page story on the album Quebra-Queixo Technorama Volume 2, published by Devir. By these two works, in 2006 Julia won the Troféu HQ Mix, the main Brazilian comic book prize, in the category "Revelation Penciller". She started working for publishers in other countries, especially Marvel Comics, in which she participated in the magazine X-Men: First Class. Julia also has published works for publishers like Boom! Studios, Devil's Due and Le Lombard, among others. Some of her published works are Histórias (which compiles the comic strips she published in Folha de S. Paulo), Remy (in partnership with writer Diogo Bercito) and Pink Daïquiri (written by Mélanie Théry and Laurent Habart, with drawings by Julia and Amanda Grazini). In 2016, the Belgian publishing house Le Lombard published the graphic novel Princesse Caraboo (written by Antoine Ozanam), based on the true story of the notorious impostor Mary Baker.
