= Carl Pfeufer =

American sculptor

- Born: Carl T. Pfeufer; September 29, 1910 Mexico
- Died: May 5, 1980 (aged 69)
- Areas: Penciller, Inker
- Notable works: Sub-Mariner, Tom Mix

Carl T. Pfeufer (September 29, 1910 – May 5, 1980) was an American comic-book artist, magazine illustrator, painter, and sculptor. He was an early contributor to American comic books; one of the primary early artists of the Marvel Comics superhero the Sub-Mariner; and the longtime artist of Western hero Tom Mix's comic books.

== Biography ==
=== Early life and career ===
Though raised in New York City, New York, Carl Pfeufer was born in Mexico, as were his three older brothers, Herbert J., Alfred E., and Emil F. Pfeufer, while younger brothers James F. and William G. Pfeufer were born in Texas and New Jersey, respectively, and sister Ethel M. Pfeufer, the youngest child, and mother Anna (Mongold) Pfeufer, were born in New York State. The family returned to the United States in 1913. His father, Alfred Pfeufer, born in Comfort, Texas, died in 1919 after the family settled in New York, where his mother had been born.

Sources differ as to Pfeufer's later education. Either he attended the college Cooper Union directly after high school, or he attended Cooper Union at age 16 after attending a two-year vocational school for commercial art. He won a Hors Concours award for his life drawings, and later attended the National Academy of Design, where he was compelled to turn down a Prix de Rome scholarship due to family obligations. He continued his studies at the Grand Central School of Art, the Art Students League of New York, and privately with the American Impressionist painter William Starkweather.

In the 1930s, Pfeufer found work as a staff artist for the newspaper then known as The Brooklyn Daily Eagle. He also did magazine illustration, both for pulp magazines and for glossy magazines such as Macfadden Publications' Liberty, for which he painted covers.

=== Golden Age of Comic Books ===
In 1935, Pfeufer and writer Bob Moore created a science-fiction adventure comic strip titled either Don Dixon and the Lost Empire or Don Dixon and the Hidden Empire for the Brooklyn, New York, newspaper The Brooklyn Daily Eagle and its syndicate, the Watkins Syndicate. Premiering as a Sunday page on either October 6 or October 20, 1935, it was accompanied by a "topper" strip, Tad of the Tanbark. The following year, Pfeufer made his comic-book debut with reprints of the strips appearing as initially one- or two-page features in Dell Comics' Popular Comics #6-8 (cover-dated July-Sept. 1936). The two comic strips ran through 1942.

Pfeufer's distinctive version of the Sub-Mariner, from Marvel Mystery Comics #42 (April 1943). Reprinted in The Golden Age of Marvel Comics (1997).

The two features, published both in Popular Comics and Dell's The Funnies, grew to two pages each as of Popular Comics #28 (May 1938). Following the evolution of the nascent medium during the 1930s-1940s period known as the Golden Age of Comic Books, "Don Dixon" had become a six-page comic-book feature by the time its creators switched publishers and it was appearing in Centaur Comics' Amazing Mystery Funnies vol. 2, #-8-9 (Aug.-Sept. 1939). By then Pfeufer had succeeded John Hales as artist on another feature, "Gordon Fife and the Boy King", in Dell's The Comics and Eastern Color's Reg'lar Fellers Heroic Comics, where all three of Pfeufer's features were appearing by 1941. Who's Who lists this as a Watkins Syndicate strip for which Pfeufer drew the daily from 1936 to 1942 and the Sunday strip from 1940 to 1942. That source additionally lists another early Pfeufer feature, "Scissor Sketches", drawn from 1935 to 1937.

Pfeufer's first confirmed Sub-Mariner art, for Marvel Comics' 1940s forerunner, Timely Comics, was the 12-page story "Fingers of Death" in Marvel Mystery Comics #32 (June 1942), though Pfeufer may have inked over character-creator Bill Everett's pencil art, or even supplied some penciling himself, as early as the Sub-Mariner story in The Human Torch #6 (Winter 1941). Working initially through the studio Funnies, Inc., one of the comic-book "packagers" of the time that supplied features and complete comic books to publishers testing the waters of the new medium, Pfeufer drew the aquatic antihero in Marvel Mystery Comics, Sub-Mariner Comics (beginning with #6, Summer 1942), All Winners Comics, All Select Comics, and at least one issue of Captain America Comics. He continued with the character though Marvel Mystery Comics #79 (Dec. 1946), with an additional, four-page Sub-Mariner story turning up two years later in Blonde Phantom Comics #20 (Nov. 1948).

As comics historian and one-time Marvel editor-in-chief Roy Thomas described, "When Bill Everett joined the army in 1942, his major successor as Sub-Mariner artist was Carl Pfeufer. Pfeufer soon evolved Namor's musculature and vaguely triangular head to almost grotesque proportions, but basically filled Bill's shoes admirably."

When work dissipated at Timely in 1946, Pfeufer began drawing for Fawcett Comics, illustrating such features as "Mr. Scarlet" and "Commando Yank" in Wow Comics. Then, with inker John Jordan, Pfeufer began a four-and-a-half-year stint penciling the licensed Western character Tom Mix in Master Comics #97-122 and 124–133, the final issue (Nov. 1948 - April 1953), as well as very occasionally in other Fawcett titles. Comics historian R. C. Harvey opined of Pfeufer's "Tom Mix" art, "For continuous, dynamic action sequences, Pfeufer simply cannot be surpassed."

During this time, Pfeufer also drew four syndicated comic strips: for the Smith-Mann Syndicate made the Western The Chisholm Kid, the first comic strip about a Black cowboy (1950-1956); and the science fiction strip Neil Knight (1950–1955), both published in Pittsburgh Courier; Alan O'Dare (1951–1954); for the New York Herald-Tribune, the daily and Sunday Bantam Prince (1951–1954).

Off Beat Detective Stories vol. 4, #6 (Jan. 1961). Cover art by Pfeufer.

=== Later life and career ===
In the 1950s and 1960s, Pfeufer continued to do syndicated comics features, drawing Our Faith (1955-1962), Thoughts (1958-1962), and Our Space Age (1960-1969). He drew unspecified "adaptations" for Dell Comics, which often licensed film and television properties, from 1957 to 1959, and did illustrations for magazines including Off Beat Detective Stories, from the Holyoke, Massachusetts-based Pontiac Publishing, as well as for Outdoor Life and Reader's Digest.

His next known comic-book work appears in a handful of superhero and science-fiction stories published in 1966 and 1967 by Harvey Comics, best known for such children's characters as Richie Rich and Casper the Friendly Ghost. With writer Otto Binder, Pfeuffer created the single-appearance features "Man from SRAM", starring an interplanetary policemen, in Jigsaw #2; "Robolink", in Spyman #2; "Alien Boy" in Thrill-O-Rama #3 (all cover-dated Dec. 1966); and "Campy Champ" in Spyman #3 (Feb. 1967). He also drew a pair of two-page science-fiction humor pieces in Unearthly Spectaculars #2-3 (Dec. 1966 - March 1967).

Again with Binder, Pfeufer co-created the military superhero character Super Green Beret, which appeared in the two issues published of the namesake series (April–June 1967) from the short-lived Lightning Comics. He also drew romance comics in 1967 for DC Comics' Girls' Love Stories and Secret Hearts.

These were Pfeufer's last new comic-book works, although an evidently inventoried, five-page standalone horror story, "The House on Brook Street", appeared in Marvel Comics' Giant-Size Chillers #2 (May 1975), with no known previous publication. He also did a set of four GI Joe comics as text for Peter Pan's Book and Record series in 1973.

His book-cover art includes the Bantam Books paperbacks Tales from the Twilight Zone (1977) and Stories from the Twilight Zone (1979).

Late in Pfeufer's life, the artist devoted himself to painting and sculpture. He was a resident of Kerr County, Texas, at the time of his death at age 69.
