= Marvel Adventures Spider-Man =

Marvel Comics series

- Marvel Adventures Spider-Man #1 (May 2005). Art by Randy Green.

Publication information
- Publisher: Marvel Comics
- Schedule: Monthly
- Format: Ongoing
- Publication date: May 2005 – May 2010 (Vol. 1); June 2010 – May 2012 (Vol. 2)
- No. of issues: 61 (Vol. 1); 24 (Vol. 2)
- Main character(s): Spider-Man; Sophia "Chat" Sanduval

Creative team
- Created by: Daniel Quantz; Mark Brooks
- Written by: …Age; Daniel Quantz (1–6); Todd DeZago (7–11, 15, 17–18); Mike Raicht (12–14, 16, 19–20) …Adventures Vol. 1 Kitty Fross (1); Erica David (2–3); Jeff Parker (4); Sean McKeever (5–12); Zeb Wells (13–16); Peter David (17–20, 29–32); Fred Van Lente (21–24, 33–36); Chris Kipiniak (25–28, 38); Marc Sumerak (37, 39–44, 46); Todd DeZago (45); Paul Tobin (53–61) …Adventures Vol. 2 Paul Tobin (1–24)
- Artist(s): …Age; Derec Aucoin (12–14); Shane Davis (15); Gus Vasquez (16); Logan Lubera (17–18); Valentine DeLandro (19–20) …Adventures Vol. 1 Cory Hamscher (22–24); Patrick Scherberger (25–28); Jonboy Meyers (44); Zach Howard (45)
- Penciller(s): …Age; Mark Brooks (1–6); Jonboy Meyers (7–11) …Adventures Vol. 1 Patrick Scherberger (1–8, 13–16); Mike Norton (9–12, 17–20); Michael O'Hare (21); Pop Mhan (29–32); Cory Hamscher (33–36); Ale Garza (37); David Nakayama (38, 40); Ryan Stegman (39, 41); Vicenc Villagrasa (42); Carlos Verreira (43)
- Inker: Cory Hamscher (21)
- Colorist: Guru eFX (21)

Marvel Adventures Spider-Man (preceded by Marvel Age Spider-Man) is a Marvel Comics comic book series intended for all ages, especially children, that ran for 61 issues from May 2005 through May 2010. The Marvel Age Spider-Man stories were based on early issues that Stan Lee wrote in the 1960s. The first few issues of Marvel Adventures Spider-Man carried on this tradition before switching to original, single-issue stories, as part of the company's Marvel Adventures imprint, with Paul Tobin beginning an ongoing storyline from Issue #53 onward, introducing Sophia "Chat" Sanduval as the primary love interest of the Marvel Adventures Spider-Man, the series set in its own alternate continuity of Earth-20051. In June 2010, the series was relaunched as Spider-Man: Marvel Adventures, written in its totality by Tobin, running for a further 24 issues until May 2012, for a total of 85 issues across both volumes.

Tobin's run of the series has received a universally positive critical reception.

== Marvel Age Spider-Man ==
1. "Duel to the Death with the Vulture" / "The Uncanny Threat of the Terrible Tinkerer" (re-telling of The Amazing Spider-Man #2)
2. "Spider-Man vs. Doctor Octopus" (re-telling of The Amazing Spider-Man #3)
3. "Nothing Can Stop the Sandman!" (re-telling of The Amazing Spider-Man #4)
4. "Marked for Destruction by Doctor Doom!" (re-telling of The Amazing Spider-Man #5)
5. "Face-to-Face with the Lizard!" (re-telling of The Amazing Spider-Man #6)
6. "The Return of the Vulture" (re-telling of The Amazing Spider-Man #7)
7. "The Terrible Threat of the Living Brain!" / "Spider-Man Tackles the Torch!" (re-telling of The Amazing Spider-Man #8)
8. "The Man Called Electro!" (re-telling of The Amazing Spider-Man #9)
9. "The Enforcers!" (re-telling of The Amazing Spider-Man #10)
10. "The Return of Doctor Octopus!" (re-telling of The Amazing Spider-Man #11)
11. "Unmasked by Doctor Octopus!" (re-telling of The Amazing Spider-Man #12)
12. "The Menace of Mysterio" (re-telling of The Amazing Spider-Man #13)
13. "The Grotesque Adventure of the Green Goblin!" (re-telling of The Amazing Spider-Man #14)
14. "Kraven the Hunter" (re-telling of The Amazing Spider-Man #15)
15. "Duel with Daredevil!" (re-telling of The Amazing Spider-Man #16)
16. "Return of the Green Goblin" (re-telling of The Amazing Spider-Man #17)
17. "The End of Spider-Man!" (re-telling of The Amazing Spider-Man #18)
18. "Spidey Strikes Back!" (re-telling of The Amazing Spider-Man #19)
19. "The Coming of the Scorpion!" (re-telling of The Amazing Spider-Man #20)
20. "Where Flies the Beetle!" (re-telling of The Amazing Spider-Man #21)

== Marvel Adventures Spider-Man (Vol. 1) ==
1. "Here Comes Spider-Man" (re-telling of Amazing Fantasy #15) – The story starts out as an introduction of Peter Parker. The story flashes to a school assembly in which a group of scientists explain radiation rays with experimentation on a spider. The radiated spider jumps onto Peter and bites his hand, causing him to gain powers. The rest of the story is about Peter becoming cocky and blaming himself for his uncle's death.
2. "The Sinister Six Part 1" (re-telling of The Amazing Spider-Man Annual #1, part 1) – Doctor Octopus, Electro, Mysterio, Kraven the Hunter, the Vulture and the Sandman team up to become the Sinister Six, while Peter suddenly loses his powers.
3. "The Sinister Six Part 2" (re-telling of The Amazing Spider-Man Annual #1, part 2) – Spider-Man's powers return, and he goes off to fight the Sinister Six and save Aunt May and J. Jonah Jameson.
4. "Goom Got Game" – The Human Torch reluctantly teams up with Spider-Man to fight a concrete creature named Street and a large, hip-hop speaking alien named Goom.
5. "Power Struggle"
6. "Picture-Perfect Peril!"
7. "Vulture Hunt!"
8. "Rush Hour!"
9. "Doom With A View!"
10. "Make Mine Mysterio!"
11. "They Call Him Mad!"
12. "Nightmare on Spidey Street!"
13. "The Chameleon Caper!!"
14. "The Black Cat?!"
15. "How Spider-Man Stopped Worrying and Learned to Love the Arms!"
16. "I, Reptile!"
17. "Hair of the Dog That Bit, Ya"
18. "Untitled"
19. "Untitled" – Spider-Man faces Fin Fang Foom.
20. "Monster Mash"
21. "Fashion Victims!"
22. "World War G"
23. "Dust-Up in Aisle Seven"
24. "Breaking Up Is Venomous to Do"
25. "Three Rings... of Danger"
26. "Reading, Writing and a Robot"
27. "But Seriously, Folks"
28. "I Hate Spider-Man"
29. "Rock and Roll"
30. "Whirlwind Trout"
31. "Fired"
32. "Submerged"
33. "The Tenant"
34. "The Unnatural"
35. "The Side-Kick" – Venom wants to do good. In the end, it turns out he only wanted revenge.
36. "The Good Son" – Harry tries to free his father Norman from prison. But after finally figuring out that what he is doing is wrong, he helps Spider-Man.
37. "School of Hard Knocks" – Peter attends a self-defense class, but the instructor is revealed to only want to sell off students as villains.
38. "There's No Bee in Team" – Spider-Man fights a villain named Swarm.
39. "Model Student" – Peter volunteers to show a new kid from Latveria. Suddenly the Fantastic Four attacks Peter and his newfound friend. Could this be the work of Dr. Doom?
40. "If I Had a Hammer..." – An evil goddess controls Spider-Man, helping her take over Asgard. Can Thor help Spider-Man break free?
41. "The Need for Speed Stampede"
42. "Cat Fight"
43. "A Whale of a Tale"
44. "Evil on a Grander Scale" – Spider-Man discovers that Curt Connors is not the only Lizard in town. But who is the one pulling his strings?
45. "Pieces of the Puzzle"
46. "Silent Nights" – Peter struggles to find Aunt May an expensive Christmas gift. Guest starring the Chameleon.
47. "Everything You Read" – Spider-Man finds the Prowler, another misunderstood hero, searching for a giant dragon that stole his inventions.
48. "Two for One" – Spider-Man is being attacked constantly by Electro and the Scorpion.
49. "Playing Hero" – Spider-Man must fight a robot called the Ultimate Gamer Arcade.
50. "Sinister Sixteenth" – It is Peter's birthday and it seems like nobody cares. Meanwhile, the Green Goblin, Doctor Octopus, Hydro-man, the Scorpion, the Rhino, and Electro team up and become the new Sinister Six.
51. "PVP (Pete vs. Pete)" – A scientist becomes Paste Pot Pete, who has the ability to shoot glue, and it seems New York has a sticky situation on its hands.
52. "No Substitute" – Spider-Man must team up with Spider-Woman to take down a group of spies.
53. "A Sense of Responsibility" – Emma Frost and her friend Sophia "Chat" Sanduval discover high school student Peter Parker's unusual secret.
54. "Taken for a Ride" – While Peter goes on a "date" with a girl at school, he must deal with a carjacker and a car stealing ring.
55. "Why I Was Late for Class" – Captain George Stacy pressures New York's underworld by using his daughter Gwen as a pawn and Spider-Man teams up with the NYPD to stop the enforcer known as Tombstone, teaming up with Captain America in the process.
56. "Vigilantes"
57. "The Silencer"
58. "Ladies! Ladies! Wait Your Turn!"
59. "Bring It"
60. "I've Got a Badge!"
61. "A Birdie Said You'd Be Here"

== Spider-Man: Marvel Adventures (Vol. 2) ==
1. "Gwen-terview with the Spider" (feat. Franklin Richards: Son of a Genius "Sick Day!" / "Brain Game!")
2. "Shang-Chi! Your Time Has Come!"
3. "Wolverine Is On the Move!"
4. "Bullseye"
5. "A Man Needs to Work"
6. "Your Beautiful Mutant Girlfriend"
7. "The Mutant Debate"
8. "The Amazing Mace vs. Cinder"
9. "Agent Nine & Mr. Punch vs. The Vulture"
10. "Day of the Lynx!"
11. "This! Is! Florida!"
12. "Into the Lion's Den"
13. "The Raptor of the Baskervilles"
14. "The Illusionist" ("The Magically Malevolent Mayhem of Mysterio!")
15. "Council of Doom!"
16. "Magically Suspicious" ("Who the Goblin Is That?)
17. "Six-To-One-Shot!" / "Bird of a Feather"
18. "Goblin Ball" / "Rent Strike" (feat. The Green Goblin & The Menace of Madame Masque)
19. "The Amazing Spider-Man in... Going Cosmic!" ("Ride the Skyways with the Silver Surfer!") / "The Hundred-Story Hunt"
20. "The Sandstorm" / "Jungle Evil!" (feat. Prep & Landing "Mansion: Impossible!")
21. "A Harrowing Tale of Gods and Mutants!" ("Marvel at the Magnetic Mutant Menace of... Magneto") / "Face Off"
22. "Fight Club" / "Dumb Luck!"
23. "There Can Be Only One!" / "Control Freak!"
24. "If You Can't Beat 'Em!" / "The Kingpin"

== Characters ==
- Peter Parker / Spider-Man / Mace / Agent Nine / Spider-Surfer – The wall-crawling superhero of New York City, who uses "Boot to the Head!" as a recurring catchphrase (after the skit by The Frantics).
- Sophia "Chat" Sanduval / Mysterious Girl X – Peter's girlfriend, a mutant girl able to talk to animals, who works for a private detective agency and sometimes joins him in hero work.
- Emma Frost / The Silencer – Chat's former best friend, a criminal able to read minds who then reforms as the amoral superhero "The Silencer", joining the Blonde Phantom Detective Agency.
- Louise Mason / Blonde Phantom – The head of the Blonde Phantom Detective Agency and Chat's and Emma's boss.
- Gwen Stacy – One of Peter's classmates, a would-be investigative journalist made by Emma to think herself dating Peter as a prank, before actually dating Carter.
- Captain George Stacy – Gwen's father, a police captain whom he accidentally reveals his identity to.
- Carter Torino – The grandson of the head of the Torino crime family, who wishes to distance himself from his family.
- Lester / Bullseye – An assassin hired by the Torino crime family to kill Spider-Man.
- Berto Torino – The head of the Torino crime family and a rival of the Kingpin.
- Venom – A symbiote bonded to Peter. Unlike other iterations of the character, this Venom is purely benevolent; after Eddie Brock attempts to use him for villainy, Venom turns off Brock's brain and uses his body to be a hero and try and convince Peter to take him back.
- Liz Allan – One of Peter's classmates and his former crush.
- Aunt May – Peter's aunt and guardian.
- Wolverine – A member of the X-Men, who first meets Peter when the X-Men mistake him for a mutant due to Chat.
- Ka-Zar the Savage – A hero from the Savage Land investigating trouble in England.
- The T.U.F.F. (Teenage Ultimate Forteans Forever) – An adventuring society of teenagers (a parody of Mystery Incorporated from Scooby-Doo, named after Charles Fort) who Peter makes friends with in his civilian guise, one of whom, Valerie, holds a deep crush on him.
- Felicia Hardy / Black Cat – Peter's ex-girlfriend, a thief-turned-employee of the Blonde Phantom Detective Agency.

== Publications ==
=== Collected editions ===
==== Volume 1 (2004–2010) ====
#	Title	Material collected	Format	Pages	Released	ISBN
Marvel Age Spider-Man
1	Fearsome Foes	Marvel Age Spider-Man #1–4	Digest	96	Jun 2004	978-0785114390
2	Everyday Hero	Marvel Age Spider-Man #5–8	Digest	96	Aug 2004	978-0785114512
3	Swingtime	Marvel Age Spider-Man #9–12	Digest	96	Sep 2004	978-0785115489
4	The Goblin Strikes Back	Marvel Age Spider-Man #13–16	Digest	96	Nov 2004	978-0785115496
5	Spidey Strikes Back	Marvel Age Spider-Man #17–20	Digest	96	Mar 2005	978-0785116325
	Marvel Age Spider-Man Team-Up: A Little Help From My Friends	Marvel Age Spider-Man Team-Up #1–5	Digest	96	Jun 2005	978-0785116110
Marvel Adventures Spider-Man
1	The Sinister Six	Marvel Adventures Spider-Man #1–4	Digest	96	Sep 2005	978-0785117391
2	Power Struggle	Marvel Adventures Spider-Man #5–8	Digest	96	Jan 2006	978-0785119036
3	Doom With A View!	Marvel Adventures Spider-Man #9–12	Digest	96	Jul 2006	978-0785120056
4	Concrete Jungle	Marvel Adventures Spider-Man #13–16	Digest	96	Sep 2006	978-0785120056
5	Monsters On The Prowl	Marvel Adventures Spider-Man #17–20	Digest	96	Jan 2007	978-0785123095
6	The Black Costume	Marvel Adventures Spider-Man #21–24	Digest	96	May 2007	978-0785123101
7	Secret Identity	Marvel Adventures Spider-Man #25–28	Digest	96	Sep 2007	978-0785123859
8	Forces Of Nature	Marvel Adventures Spider-Man #29–32	Digest	96	Jan 2008	978-0785125259
9	Fiercest Foes	Marvel Adventures Spider-Man #33–36	Digest	96	Apr 2008	978-0785125266
10	Identity Crisis	Marvel Adventures Spider-Man #37–40	Digest	96	Sep 2008	978-0785128694
11	Animal Instinct	Marvel Adventures Spider-Man #41–44	Digest	96	Jan 2009	978-0785128700
12	Jumping To Conclusions	Marvel Adventures Spider-Man #45–48	Digest	96	May 2009	978-0785128717
13	Animal Attack!	Marvel Adventures Spider-Man #49–52	Digest	96	Aug 2009	978-0785136392
14	Thwip!	Marvel Adventures Spider-Man #53–56	Digest	96	Dec 2009	978-0785136408
15	Peter Parker vs. The X-Men	Marvel Adventures Spider-Man #58–61	Digest	96	Apr 2010	978-0785141167
	Venom Adventures	Marvel Adventures Spider-Man #21, 24, 35; Marvel Universe Ultimate Spider-Man #16, 19	Digest	114	Sep 2018	978-1302913632
Hardcover
1	Marvel Adventures Spider-Man Vol. 1	Marvel Adventures Spider-Man #1–8	OHC	192	Oct 2006	978-0785124320

==== Volume 2 (2010–2012) ====
#	Title	Material collected	Format	Pages	Released	ISBN
1	Amazing	Marvel Adventures Spider-Man (vol. 2) #1–4	Digest	96	Oct 2010	978-0785141181
2	Spectacular	Marvel Adventures Spider-Man (vol. 2) #5–8	Digest	96	Feb 2011	978-0785145608
3	Sensational	Marvel Adventures Spider-Man (vol. 2) #9–12	Digest	96	May 2011	978-0785147404
4	Friendly Neighborhood	Marvel Adventures Spider-Man (vol. 2) #13–16	Digest	96	2011	
5	Tangled Web	Marvel Adventures Spider-Man (vol. 2) #17–20	Digest	96	2011	
6	Amazing Fantasy	Marvel Adventures Spider-Man (vol. 2) #21–24	Digest	96	2012	

=== Hardcover editions ===
- Marvel Adventures Spider-Man Vol. 1 (2006-10-18, ISBN 0-7851-2432-2): Includes Marvel Adventures Spider-Man (2005) Volume 1: The Sinister Six and Volume 2: Power Struggle.
