= Sophia "Chat" Sanduval =

Comic book superhero

Publication information
- Publisher: Marvel Comics
- First appearance: Marvel Adventures Spider-Man #53 (July 2009)
- Created by: Paul Tobin (writer); Matteo Lolli (artist)

In-story information
- Species: Human mutant
- Team affiliations: Blonde Phantom Detective Agency
- Partnerships: Spider-Man; Emma "The Silencer" Frost; Spider-Girl (Earth-616)
- Notable aliases: Chat, Beautiful Mutant Girlfriend, Mysterious Girl X, The Animal Whisperer, The Canine Verbalizer, Bird Queen, Squirrel Girl
- Abilities: Ability to communicate with animals

Sophia "Chat" Sanduval is a superhero appearing in American comic books published by Marvel Comics. She first appeared in Marvel Adventures Spider-Man #53 (July 2009), a series in the Marvel Adventures imprint for young readers, taking place in Earth-20051, an alternate reality from mainstream Marvel continuity. She was created by writer Paul Tobin and artist Matteo Lolli as the primary girlfriend for a teenage Peter Parker/Spider-Man.

A mutant, Chat possesses the ability to talk to animals. She sees herself as both Peter Parker and Spider-Man's girlfriend, and has managed to involve herself in Peter's civilian and superhero lives, joining the Blonde Phantom Detective Agency and helping Peter in battle as Mysterious Girl X.

== Publication history ==
Chat was created by author Paul Tobin as an original girlfriend for the Peter Parker/Spider-Man appearing in his Marvel Adventures Spider-Man comic book. She first appeared in Marvel Adventures Spider-Man #53 and appeared in every subsequent issue until the series was canceled with #61 (July 2009 – March 2010).

Chat next appeared in Tobin's Spider-Man Marvel Adventures comic-book series, which continue the stories started in Marvel Adventures Spider-Man. These stories feature a teenage Peter Parker/Spider-Man with a supporting cast of revamped Marvel Comics characters, as well as all-new characters such as Chat.

Chat was introduced into the mainstream Marvel universe in the 2011 series Spider-Girl #4 as a friend of Anya Corazon's new roommate. It is unknown if she is a mutant or a normal human in this reality.

== Fictional character biography ==
Little is known about Chat's childhood except that she was raised by an unknown mother and has an older sister. She is secretive about her mother and admits she hasn't talked about her for a couple years.

A young mutant, Chat has the power to communicate with animals, an ability that also makes animals act unusually friendly around her. Although this aspect of her power embarrassed her, Chat used her animal affinity to help run a traveling zoo that visited all the New York orphanages.

At some point, Chat felt herself "falling apart" and tried to re-establish her life. Becoming a runaway, she met Emma Frost, a teenage mutant with the ability to read and control minds. Self-absorbed and immoral, Emma regularly used her powers to rob stores and learn intimate secrets by peeking into people's minds. Although Chat disapproved of Emma's actions and often tried to stop her, she was too timid to truly stand up to Emma.

This began to change when Chat and Emma were saved from a falling sign by Peter Parker, a teenager who was secretly the adventurous superhero known as Spider-Man. When Emma, using her telepathy, discovered Peter's secret, she convinced Chat they could "have some fun" by going to Peter's high school and learning more about his other identity. Through a mind-link set up by Emma, Chat discovered how Peter became Spider-Man and was profoundly affected by his sense of responsibility, which she found both noble and attractive. Convincing Emma to help her enroll at Peter's school, Chat began dating Peter and would often use her powers secretly to help Spider-Man.

Chat eventually told Peter about her mutant powers, and that she knew of his Spider-Man identity. She also joined the Blonde Phantom's detective agency, a firm that employs superhumans, and was even asked to join the X-Men, although she declined. Her relationship with Peter, along with the self-defense training she has received from the Blonde Phantom, has made Chat a much more confident and assertive person and she continues to support Peter in his duties as Spider-Man.

== Powers and abilities ==
Chat is a mutant with the power to communicate with animals, although whether this ability is based on an understanding of animal verbal/non-verbal communication or a form of telepathy is not yet known.

Animals sense that Chat can understand them and become very friendly around her. Even when an animal is normally aggressive, Chat can gain that animal's loyalty (she once got a criminal's bulldog to turn on his owner by telling him his master was "bad"). Chat often uses this power to calm down nervous and wounded animals at animal rescue centers.

Her natural affinity with animals, along with Chat's tendency to feed any stray who visits her, makes animals very accommodating when Chat asks them to do favors for her. In the past, Chat has asked pigeons to eavesdrop on conversations and trail people for long distances. She has convinced birds and dogs to attack criminals, and once mobilized a group of squirrels to steal letters from a mansion.

Even when Chat is not around to tell animals what to do, animals who have been around her will continue to act in her interests, usually by protecting her friends. Thus, many stray dogs, cats, and birds in New York now protect Spider-Man. (This may also have something to do with the positive image animals have of Spider-Man, as Chat mentioned dogs perceive Spider-Man as a "distinctly marked alpha male").

== Other version ==
=== Earth-616 ===
In the mainstream universe, the Earth-616 version of Sophia "Chat" Sanduval appeared in 2011's Spider-Girl: Family Values, where she was introduced by Anya Corazon's roommate Rocky who is still in her teens.
