= Giant-Girl =

In Marvel Comics, Giant-Girl refers to:

- an informal codename briefly used by Cassandra Lang
- a codename used by Janet van Dyne in the Marvel Adventures continuity
