= Blonde Phantom =

Fictional character appearing in American comic books published by Marvel Comics

- Artwork from The Steranko History of Comics 2. Art by Jim Steranko.

Publication information
- Publisher: Marvel Comics
- First appearance: All Select Comics #11 (Fall 1946)
- Created by: Stan Lee (writer); Syd Shores (artist)

In-story information
- Alter ego: Louise Grant Mason
- Species: Human
- Team affiliations: All-Winners Squad; Invaders "Avengers" (1959)
- Notable aliases: Louise Mason; Weezie
- Abilities: Skilled hand-to-hand combatant; Skilled markswoman; High-level athlete; Excellent secretary

The Blonde Phantom (Louise Grant Mason) is a fictional masked crime fighter appearing in American comic books published by Marvel Comics. Created for Marvel predecessor Timely Comics by Stan Lee and Syd Shores, the character first appeared in All Select Comics #11 (cover-dated Fall 1946), during the 1940s period fans and historians call the Golden Age of Comic Books. The heroine was so well received that the next issue was retitled The Blonde Phantom. The series continued to feature her until issue #22 (March 1949). She also appeared in backup stories in many other Timely comics; in Superhero Comics of the Golden Age, Mike Benton observes that "for a few months in 1948, readers could find her in seven titles on the newsstand." In The Supergirls, Mike Madrid asserted, "Once again, a capable woman hid behind a meek persona and only let her hair down, literally, to come to the aid of a man who completely ignored her unless she assumed a disguise. In a 1947 story entitled "I Hate Myself", Louise even dreams that Mark finally confesses his love for her, only to have the Blonde Phantom persona appear and steal him away."

Louise Grant is a secretary at the Mark Mason Detective Agency, and secretly in love with her boss. When he is on a case, Louise takes off her glasses and lets her hair down, becoming the glamorous masked hero, rescuing him from danger in a floor-length evening gown. In a gender reverse to the famous Superman/Lois Lane dynamic, Mark is in love with the Blonde Phantom, and has no interest in the mousy secretary back at the office.

Louise Mason returned in Modern Age comics as a sidekick for The Sensational She-Hulk, from 1989 to 1994, in which she is revealed to be aware of She-Hulk's ability to break the fourth wall, also being able to do so, explaining that she had been left behind by the Marvel Universe's floating timeline to age normally when she initially retired the mantle. An alternate-universe younger Blonde Phantom makes her debut in the Paul Tobin run of Marvel Adventures Spider-Man, running the Blonde Phantom Detective Agency and mentoring Sophia "Chat" Sanduval.

== Publication history ==
As superheroes began to fade out of fashion in the post-war era, comic book publishers scrambled to explore new types of stories, characters, and audiences. In an attempt to appeal to young female readers, comics companies began introducing some of the first significant superheroines since Wonder Woman. Those of Marvel Comics' 1940s predecessor, Timely Comics, included Golden Girl, Miss America, Namora, Sun Girl, and Venus, and its teen-humor star Millie the Model. Other companies' included Fox Comics' revival of Quality Comics' Phantom Lady and DC's Black Canary.

The creator of the Blonde Phantom is disputed. Don Markstein's Toonopedia says the character was created by writer-editor Stan Lee and artist Syd Shores, but Al Sulman claimed to have created the character during his time as script editor for Timely Comics: "Wonder Woman was popular, so Stan [Lee] thought we should have a heroine, too. So I created a character called 'The Blonde Phantom', and I wrote those strips myself". Stan Lee also mentioned that Sulman wrote for the feature in his article "There's Money in Comics" from Writer's Digest in 1947, in which he said: "A sample page from a script of "The Blonde Phantom" follows. This is an actual page, just as it was typed by Al Sulman, the writer".

The Blonde Phantom debuted in All Select Comics #11 (Fall 1946), which became Blonde Phantom Comics the following issue. The series lasted a little over two years (from #12–22, Winter 1946 to March 1949), during which time the crime fighter also appeared as a backup feature in:

- Marvel Mystery Comics #84–91 (Oct. 1947 – April 1949)
- All Winners Comics #1 (Aug. 1948)
- Sub-Mariner Comics #25–28 & 30 (Spring – Oct. 1948 & Feb. 1949)
- all three issues of Blackstone the Magician (#2–4, May–Sept. 1948)
- Namora #2 (Oct. 1948)
- Sun Girl #2–3 (Oct.-Dec. 1948).

The character was the province of no one artist, and aside from originator Shores, her adventures in this wide variety of comics were pencilled by Vince Alascia, Ken Bald, Allen Bellman, Carl Burgos, Vernon Henkel, Mike Sekowsky, Ed Winiarski, the pseudonymous Charles Nicholas, and others. When not inking themselves, the pencilers were embellished by inkers including Al Avison, Jack Binder, and Harry Sahle.

Blonde Phantom Comics changed titles and formats completely to become the anthological romance comic Lovers with issue #23 (May 1949).

=== Concurrent Blonde Phantom ===
Comics historian Jess Nevins notes that the Timely Comics teen-humor character Millie Collins wore a mask and veil and posed as the "Blonde Phantom" for a cosmetics company's publicity campaign in a story in Millie the Model #2 (Oct. 1946), published near the same time as the superheroine Blonde Phantom's debut in All-Select Comics #11 (Fall 1946). Acknowledging the shared Marvel Universe, Nevins writes that the famous model's stunt "perhaps inspired Louise Grant to put on a costume and fight crime".

=== Revival ===
The character's civilian identity, Louise Mason, was reintroduced in The Sensational She-Hulk #2 (June 1989). Two issues later, she was revealed to be the retired former superhero. Mason remained a series cast-member through the final issue, #60 (February 1994). She was featured in flashback adventures in All Select Comics 70th Anniversary Special (February 2009) and the five-issue miniseries Avengers 1959, beginning with issue #1 (December "2011).

== Fictional character biography ==
=== Origin and Golden Age adventures ===
All Winners Comics vol. 2, #1 (Aug. 1948), cover artist(s) unknown.

Louise Grant, born in Hoboken, New Jersey, was secretary to private detective Mark Mason. Enamored with her boss and wanting to help him break cases, she surreptitiously donned a black domino mask and a sexy, skintight, slit-leg red evening gown and high heels, and ventured out at night fighting crime. Highly athletic and seemingly trained in martial arts, the Blonde Phantom also carried a .45-caliber pistol. In a distaff echo of Superman and Lois Lane, Mason had a crush on the Blonde Phantom, but not on Louise. At an unspecified point, the Blonde Phantom fought alongside the All-Winners Squad superhero team for an adventure.

According to Jess Nevins' Encyclopedia of Golden Age Superheroes, "she fights ordinary gangsters, femmes fatale, the monstrous Baron Frankenstein, the insane Carlo the Killer, the stage magician criminals the Mad Magicians, and Stillface, a thug whose maimed face was rebuilt with plaster".

=== Modern Age ===
In Modern Age comics, Louise Grant has left crimefighting to marry her employer, Mark Mason, in 1949 and takes his last name. She gives birth to their daughter Wanda and, later, to son Earl. After her husband's death, she begins working as a legal secretary for district attorney Blake Tower in the 1989–1994 series The Sensational She-Hulk, acting as the general voice-of-reason for both Tower and Jennifer Walters / She-Hulk.

Mason often finds herself more or less willingly pulled into the She-Hulk's surreal adventures, and occasionally vice versa. They confront many menaces, from Stilt-Man in issue #4 (Aug. 1989) to a town where stepping out of line, even swearing, is fatally punished. Mason even accompanies She-Hulk into outer space, where the pair become allies of the space-faring hero Razorback and his compatriots U.S. Archer and Al the alien. After being taken prisoner by the subterranean ruler the Mole Man, she's restored to a more youthful version of herself by a mysterious chemical process in issue #33 (Nov. 1991).

Louise's daughter becomes the Phantom Blonde in She-Hulk #23 (Jan. 1991); cover art by Kevin Maguire and Jim Sanders III.

Mason, affectionately nicknamed "Weezi", begins a romantic relationship with Jennifer's father, Morris Walters in #36 (Feb. 1992). Mason later finds herself trading physical stature and powers with a none-too-pleased She-Hulk in issue #48–49 (Feb.-March 1993), becoming so enamored with her new form and abilities that she only changes back when Morris reveals he wants Weezi the way she had been.

== Powers and abilities ==
The Blonde Phantom had no superhuman powers. She is an athletic woman, a skilled hand-to-hand combatant, and a fine markswoman with the conventional handgun she carried. She also possesses excellent secretarial skills, as the secretary for the Mark Mason Detective Agency, and later as the secretary of New York City District Attorney Blake Tower.

== Reception ==
Deirdre Kaye of Scary Mommy called Blonde Phanthom a "role model" and "truly heroic." Ben Patton of CBR.com ranked Blonde Phantom 2nd in their "Marvel: 5 Great Characters from the Past (& 5 Best Left Forgotten)" list, while Megan Nicole O'Brien ranked her 8th in their "Marvel: 10 Best Golden Age Heroines" list, and Albinder Cole ranked her 9th in their "10 Marvel Characters Who Deserve Their Own Series Again" list, and 10th in their "10 Characters We Want to See on a Second Season of She-Hulk: Attorney at Law" list. Comics Buyer's Guide ranked Blonde Phantom 98th in their "100 Sexiest Women in Comics" list.

== Other versions ==
=== Phantom Blonde ===
Louise's daughter, Wanda Louise Mason, introduced in The Sensational She-Hulk #21 (Nov. 1990), briefly followed her mother's crime-fighter legacy, becoming the costumed Phantom Blonde two issues later, in a story by writer Steve Gerber and penciler Buzz Dixon. She was later considered a "potential recruit" for the US government's superhero-training program, the Initiative.

=== Marvel Adventures Spider-Man ===
The Louise Mason version of Blonde Phantom appears as a recurring character in Marvel Adventures Spider-Man and its follow-up series, Spider-Man Marvel Adventures, both published as part of the young-readers Marvel Adventures imprint, taking place on Earth-20051, a non-canonical alternate reality from mainstream Marvel continuity. Here, she is portrayed as a famed private detective who often works as a confidant to Spider-Man and his girlfriend Sophia "Chat" Sanduval, recruiting the latter to the Blonde Phantom Detective Agency, as well as Emma Frost / The Silencer and Felicia Hardy / Black Cat.
