= X-Men: First Class (comics) =

Marvel comic book series starring the original X-Men

- Cover art for X-Men: First Class (vol. 1) #1. Art by Marko Djurdjevic.

Publication information
- Publisher: Marvel Comics
- Schedule: Monthly
- Format: List: (vol. 1): Limited series (vol. 2): Ongoing series (vol. 3): Limited Series
- Genre: Superhero
- Publication date: List: (vol. 1) November 2006 – April 2007 (vol. 2) August 2007 – November 2008 (vol. 3) (as First Class Finals) April – July 2009
- No. of issues: List: (vol. 1): 8 (vol. 2): 16 (vol. 3): 4 Specials: 2
- Main character: List: Cyclops Marvel Girl Beast Iceman Angel Professor X

Creative team
- Created by: Jeff Parker
- Written by: List: (vol. 1–3) Jeff Parker
- Penciller: List: (vol. 1–3) Roger Cruz (vol. 3) Amilcar Pinna
- Inker: List: (vol. 1) Victor Olazaba
- Colorist: List: (vol. 1–3) Val Staples

Collected editions
- Tomorrow's Brightest: ISBN 0-7851-2427-6

X-Men: First Class is a comic book series published by Marvel Comics starring the original X-Men.

== Publication history ==
The original series was an eight-issue limited series. It began in September 2006 and ended in April 2007. It was written by Jeff Parker and penciled by Roger Cruz. It was followed by a special issue in May 2007 and a monthly series that premiered in June 2007 with the same creative team.

Many of the series' stories are done in single issues, some are two-parters and multiple issue arcs. The original team of X-Men are wearing new costumes in the series. The series guest-stars many other characters, such as the Lizard, Quicksilver, Scarlet Witch, Man-Thing, Gorilla-Man, Doctor Strange, Invisible Woman, and Thor.

The series has spawned a few spin-offs, titles including the ongoing series Wolverine: First Class, and the miniseries Weapon X: First Class.

The ongoing series lasted sixteen issues and it was followed by Giant-Size X-Men: First Class special issue. Starting February 2009, a four-issue miniseries titled X-Men: First Class Finals encompasses volume 3. This ends with the team going on to the Krakoa island mission.

A new volume called Uncanny X-Men: First Class premiered in an August 2009 one-shot Uncanny X-Men: First Class Giant-Sized and concentrated on the team first introduced originally back in Giant-Sized X-Men #1.

== Creative teams ==
- X-Men: First Class (vol. 1)
  - Writer: Jeff Parker
  - Pencils: Roger Cruz
  - Inks: Victor Olazaba
  - Colored by: Val Staples
  - Lettered by: Nate Piekos
  - Cover by: Marko Djurdjevic
- X-Men: First Class Special
  - Writer: Jeff Parker
  - Pencils: Kevin Nowlan, Paul Smith, Mike Allred, Nick Dragotta
  - Inks: Kevin Nowlan
  - Colored by: Kevin Nowlan
  - Lettered by: Nate Piekos
- X-Men: First Class (vol. 2)
  - Writer: Jeff Parker
  - Pencils and Inks: Roger Cruz
  - Colored by: Val Staples
  - Lettered by: Nate Piekos
  - Cover by: Eric Nguyen

== Publications ==
- X-Men: First Class (vol. 1) (8-issue limited series, September 2006 - April 2007)
- X-Men: First Class Special (one-shot, May 2007)
- X-Men: First Class (vol. 2) #1-16 (ongoing series, June 2007 - November 2008)
- Giant Size X-Men: First Class #1 (one-shot, November 2008)
- X-Men: First Class Finals #1-4 (February - May 2009)
- "Class Portraits" one-shots (January - March 2011)
  - Magneto Vol. 2 #1
  - Marvel Girl #1
  - Cyclops Vol. 2 #1
  - Iceman and Angel #1
- Giant Size Uncanny X-Men: First Class #1 (one-shot, August 2009)
- Uncanny X-Men: First Class #1-8 (September 2009 - April 2010)
- Wolverine: First Class #1-21 (ongoing series, May 2008 - January 2010)
- Weapon X: First Class #1-3 (January - March 2009)

=== Collected editions ===
The stories have been collected into trade paperbacks:

Title	Material collected	Pages	ISBN
Tomorrow's Brightest	X-Men: First Class vol. 1 #1-8	184	ISBN 0-7851-2427-6
Mutant Mayhem	X-Men: First Class vol. 2 #1-5 and Special	152	ISBN 0-7851-2781-X
Band of Brothers	X-Men: First Class vol. 2 #6-10	192	ISBN 0-7851-2599-X
The Wonder Years	X-Men: First Class vol. 2 #11-16 and Giant-Size X-Men: First Class #1	168	ISBN 0-7851-3347-X
Finals	X-Men: First Class Finals #1-4 and Giant-Size X-Men vol. 1 #1	136	ISBN 0-7851-3348-8
Class Portraits	Cyclops (Vol. 2) #1, Iceman & Angel #1, Magneto (Vol. 2) #1 and Marvel Girl #1	144	ISBN 0785155597
Hated And Feared	Giant-Size Uncanny X-Men: First Class and Uncanny X-Men: First Class #1-4	136	ISBN 0-7851-4104-9
Knights Of Hykon	Uncanny X-Men: First Class #5-8	136	ISBN 0-7851-4237-1
The Rookie	Wolverine: First Class #1-4, and Incredible Hulk #181	120	ISBN 0-7851-3316-X
To Russia, With Love	Wolverine: First Class #5-8, Uncanny X-Men #139-140 and Wolverine & Power Pack #1	160	ISBN 0-7851-3317-8
Wolverine-By-Night	Wolverine: First Class #9-12 and Wolverine & Power Pack #2	120	ISBN 0-7851-3534-0
Ninjas, Gods And Divas	Wolverine: First Class #13-16, and X-Men/Power Pack #1	120	ISBN 0-7851-3535-9
Class Actions	Wolverine: First Class #17-21	120	ISBN 0-7851-3678-9
Wolverine: Tales of Weapon X	Wolverine: First Class #1-2, Weapon X: First Class #1-3 and Wolverine & Power Pack #2.	176	ISBN 0785135197

== Film ==
The 2011 film X-Men: First Class acts as a prequel to the X-Men film trilogy. Though it shares the same title as the comic series, the plots share almost no resemblance.

Producer Simon Kinberg read the comics and suggested studio 20th Century Fox to adapt it. However, Kinberg did not want to follow the comic too much, as he felt "it was not fresh enough in terms of storytelling", considering them too similar to Twilight and John Hughes movies, and also because the producers wanted an adaptation that would introduce new, hitherto unexplored X-Men characters.
