= All Select Comics =

American comic series (1943-1945)

- All Select Comics #8 (Summer 1945), cover art by Alex Schomburg.

Publication information
- Publisher: Timely Comics
- Publication date: Fall 1943 to Fall 1945
- No. of issues: 11 (retitled Blonde Phantom Comics and Lovers)

Creative team
- Written by: Stan Lee
- Artist(s): Alex Schomburg; Ken Bald; Stan Drake; Carl Pfeufer; Bob Powell; Syd Shores; Chic Stone

All Select Comics is a 1943–1945 American comic book series published by Timely Comics, the 1940s predecessor of Marvel Comics, during the period fans and historians call the Golden Age of comic books. An omnibus series with several different superhero and other features each issue, it primarily starred Captain America and the original Human Torch, two of Timely's most popular characters, as well as fellow Timely star the Sub-Mariner in several.

== Publication history ==
All Select Comics ran 11 issues, cover-dated Fall 1943 to Fall 1945. The series was renamed Blonde Phantom Comics from issues #12–22 (1947 – March 1949), and revamped as the romance comic Lovers from #23-86 (May 1949 – Aug. 1957).

The first 10 issues of All Select Comics starred the superheroes Captain America and the original Human Torch, as well as Namor the Sub-Mariner in the first five issues plus #10 (Summer 1946). The costumed crime-fighter the Blonde Phantom, created by writer-editor Stan Lee and artist Syd Shores, debuted in All Select Comics #11 (Fall 1946). The same issue also introduced the feature "Mr. Wu" (a.k.a. "The Mysterious Mr. Wu"), starring Marvel Comics' first Asian hero, an Asian-Indian private detective who went on to make one additional Timely appearance, in Blonde Phantom #12.

Other Timely superheroes appearing in various issues were the Golden Age Black Widow, the Destroyer, super-speedster the Whizzer, and, in the final issue, Miss America. The war comics feature "Jap Buster Johnson", about a two-fisted U.S. Navy lieutenant out to avenge his dead buddy, appeared in three issues, and the military humor feature "Jeep Jones" in two.

Writers and artists on the various features included Vince Alascia, Larry Antonette, Ken Bald, Dan Barry, Allen Bellman, Jack Binder, Stan Drake, Al Gabriele, Patricia Highsmith, Chad Grothkopf, Carl Pfeufer, Bob Powell, Chic Stone, and, on the final issue, Lee, Shores, Charles Nicholas, and Ed Winiarski.

All covers were by Alex Schomburg except the last, by Shores.

== Features ==
The featured characters appeared in these issues:

- Black Widow: #1
- Captain America: #1-10
- Jeep Jones: #1-2
- Jap Buster Johnson: #3, 8, 9
- The Human Torch: #1-10
- Sub-Mariner: #1-5, 10
- The Whizzer: #3-5, 7
- The Destroyer: #6, 10
- The Blonde Phantom: #11
- Miss America: #11
- Mr. Wu: #11

== Reprints ==
The first issue was reprinted in 1974 by publisher Alan L. Light's company Flashback as Special Edition Reprints #14.
