= Princess Caraboo =

English imposter (1792–1864)

Mary Baker
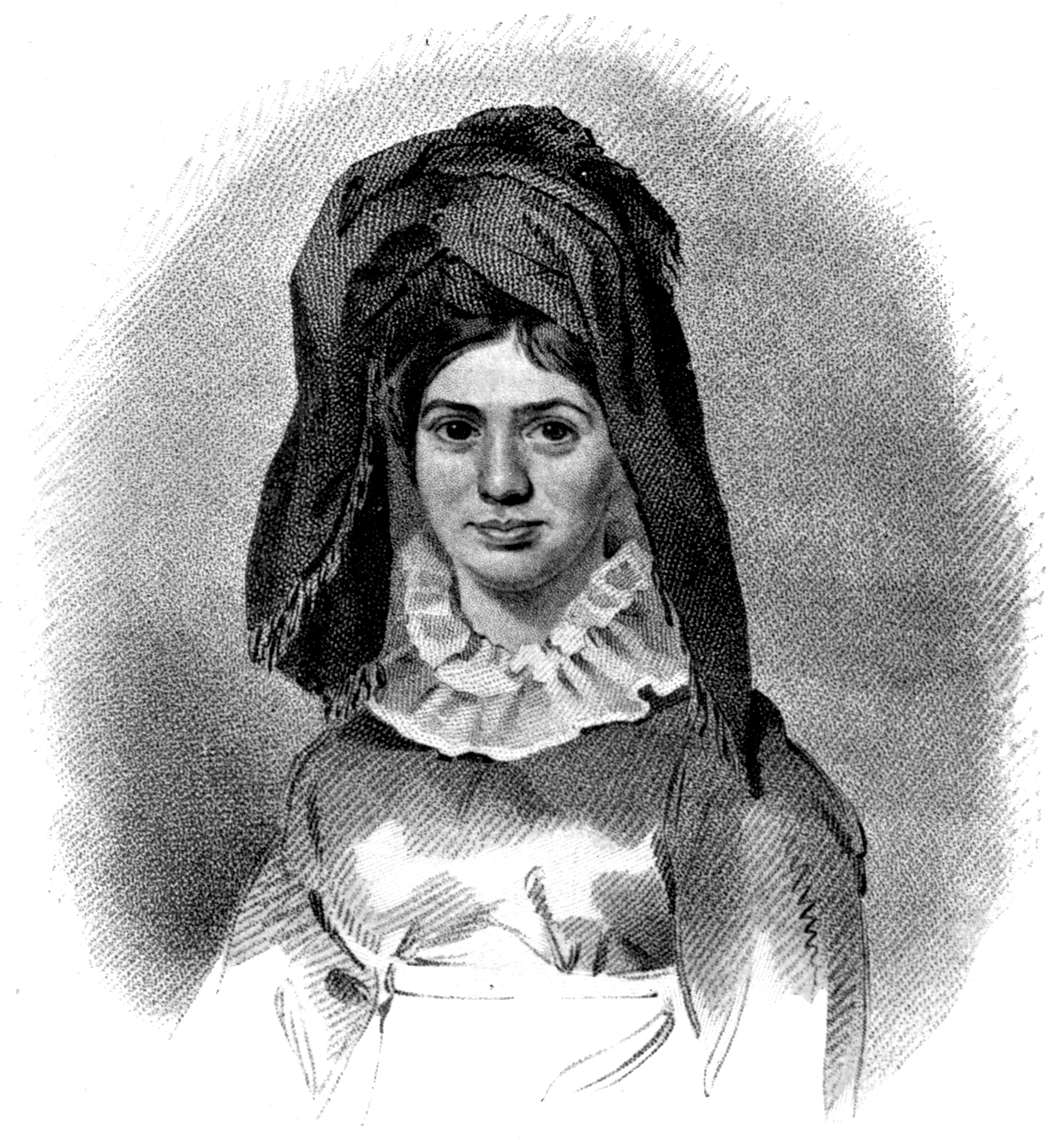
- "Princess Caraboo", drawn and engraved by N. Branwhite
- Born: Mary Willcocks; 11 November 1792 (alleged); Witheridge, Devon, England
- Died: 24 December 1864 (aged 72); Mill Street, Bedminster, Bristol, England
- Burial place: Hebron Road Cemetery, Bristol, England
- Other names: Princess Caraboo; Caraboo, Princess of Javasu; Bakerstendht; Mary Burgess
- Occupations: Leech importer, former stage actress, former impostor
- Known for: Being an imposter known as Princess Caraboo
- Criminal charges: Vagrancy, impersonation
- Criminal penalty: Imprisonment
- Criminal status: Pardoned
- Spouse: Richard Baker (m. 1828)
- Children: Mary Ann Baker (daughter) (1829–1900)
- Parents: Thomas Willcocks (father); Mary Burgess (mother)

Mary Baker (née Willcocks; 11 November 1792 (alleged), Witheridge, Devonshire, England – 24 December 1864, Bristol, England) was an English impostor. Posing as the fictional Princess Caraboo, Baker pretended to come from a far-off island kingdom and fooled a British town for some months.

== Biography ==
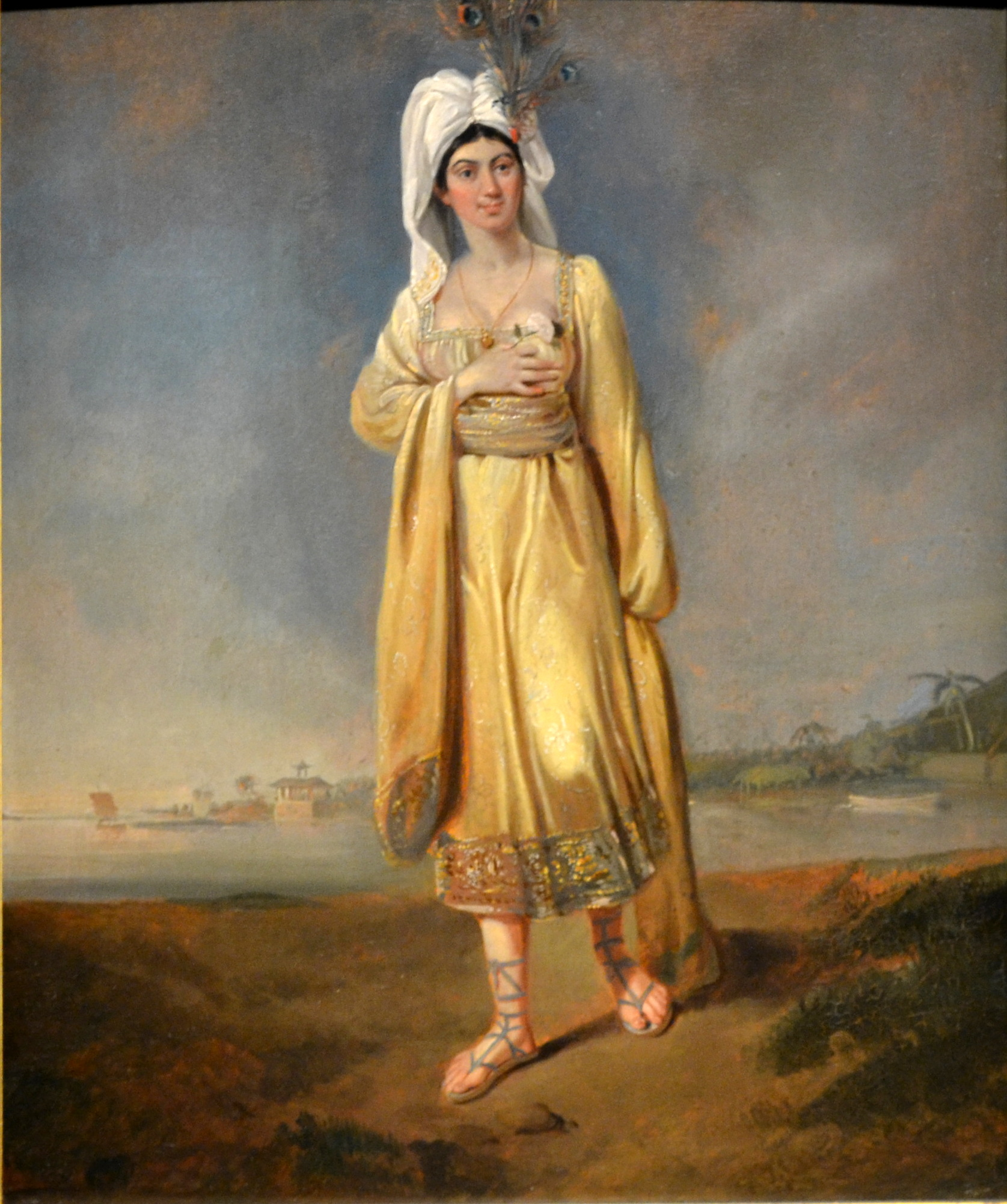
"Princess Caraboo", by Edward Bird (oil on panel, 1817)

On 3 April 1817, a cobbler in Almondsbury in Gloucestershire, England, met an apparently disoriented young woman wearing exotic clothes who was speaking an incomprehensible language. The cobbler's wife took this stranger to the Overseer of the Poor, who placed her in the hands of the local county magistrate, Samuel Worrall, who lived in Knole Park on the estate where Tower House is located. Worrall and his American-born wife Elizabeth could not understand her either; what they did determine was that she called herself Caraboo and that she was interested in Chinese imagery. They sent her to the local inn, where she identified a drawing of a pineapple with the word nanas, meaning pineapple in Indonesian languages, and insisted on sleeping on the floor. Worrall declared she was a beggar and should be taken to Bristol and tried for vagrancy.

During her imprisonment, a Portuguese sailor named Manuel Eynesso (or Enes) said he spoke her language and translated her story. According to Enes, she was Princess Caraboo from the island of Javasu in the Indian Ocean. She had been captured by pirates and after a long voyage she had jumped overboard in the Bristol Channel and swum ashore.

The Worralls took Caraboo to their home. For ten weeks, this representative of exotic royalty was a favourite of the local dignitaries. She used a bow and arrow, fenced, swam naked and prayed to a god, whom she named Allah-Talla (a spelling variation of الله تعالى Allāh taʿālā, "Allah the Exalted", one of the formal names for God in Islam). She acquired exotic clothing and her portrait was painted and reproduced in local newspapers. Her authenticity was attested to by a Dr Wilkinson, who identified her language using Edmund Fry's Pantographia (an encyclopedia of known alphabets and scripts) and stated that marks on the back of her head were the work of oriental surgeons. Newspapers published stories about Princess Caraboo's adventures bringing her national acclaim.

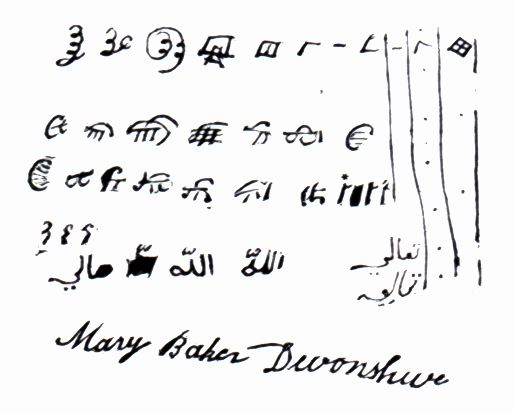
Baker's Javasu writing

Eventually the truth surfaced. A boarding-house keeper, Mrs Neale, recognised her from the picture in the Bristol Journal and informed her hosts. This would-be princess was in truth Mary Willcocks, a cobbler's daughter from Witheridge, Devon. She had been a servant girl around England but had found no place to stay. She invented her fictitious language from imaginary and Romani words and created an exotic character and story. The odd marks on her head were scars from a crude cupping operation in a poorhouse hospital in London. The British press made much of the hoax at the expense of the duped rustic middle-class. Mrs Worrall took pity on her and arranged for her to travel to Philadelphia, for which she departed on 28 June 1817.

On 13 September 1817, a letter was printed in the Bristol Journal, allegedly from Sir Hudson Lowe, the official in charge of the exiled Emperor Napoleon on St Helena. It claimed that after the Philadelphia-bound ship bearing Princess Caraboo had been driven close to the island by a tempest, she impulsively cut herself adrift in a small boat, rowed ashore and so fascinated the emperor that he was applying to the Pope for a dispensation to marry her. The story is unverified and not credible, given that St Helena is an isolated rock in the South Atlantic, many thousands of miles from the United States.

In the United States, she briefly continued her role, appearing on-stage at the Washington Hall, Philadelphia, as Princess Caraboo, with little success. Her last contact with the Worralls was in a letter from New York in November 1817, in which she complained of her notoriety. She appears to have returned to Philadelphia until she left America in 1824, returning to England.

In 1824, she returned to Britain and exhibited herself for a short time in New Bond Street, London, as Princess Caraboo but her act was not successful.

=== Later life and death ===
In September 1828, she was living as a widow in Bedminster in Somerset under the name Mary Burgess (in reality the name of a cousin). There she married Richard Baker, and gave birth to a daughter named Mary Ann the following year around 1829. In 1839, she was selling leeches to the Bristol Infirmary Hospital. She died from a fall on 24 December 1864 and was buried in the Hebron Road cemetery in Bristol. Her daughter carried on with her business, living alone in Bedminster in a house full of cats until her death in a fire in February 1900.

== In popular culture ==
=== Film ===
A biopic, Princess Caraboo, written by Michael Austin and John Wells and starring Phoebe Cates, was released to mixed reviews in 1994. It added fictional elements to the story.

=== Literature ===
The Curious Tale of the Lady Caraboo, a historical novel by Catherine Johnson, was published in 2015.

=== Theatre ===
Several stage musical adaptations have been attempted based on the story. These include a 2004 workshop starring Laura Benanti entitled Caraboo. Princess Caraboo, a full stage musical, opened on 30 March 2016 at London's Finborough Theatre, with a book and lyrics written by Phil Willmott and composed by Mark Collins. The limited-run production opened to positive reviews and was nominated for the 2016 Offies for Best New Musical and Best Lighting Design.

=== Comics ===
Princess Caraboo was a 2016 French language bande dessinée by Antoine Ozanam and Julia Bax.

== See also ==
- Korla Pandit
- George Psalmanazar

== Sources ==
- Harriet Bridgeman & Elizabeth Drury eds. The British Eccentric (1975), ISBN 0-7181-1346-2
- John Wells. Princess Caraboo: her true story (1994), ISBN 0-330-33630-4
