= Marvel Adventures: The Avengers =

Comic book series

Series publication information
- Schedule: Monthly
- Format: Color; standard modern US; saddle-stitched; glossy paper
- Genre: Superhero
- Publication date: July 2006 – October 2009
- Number of issues: 39
- Creator(s): Jeff Parker; Manuel Garcia

The Avengers (Marvel Adventures)

Group publication information
- Publisher: Marvel Comics
- First appearance: Marvel Adventures: The Avengers #1 (July 2006)
- Created by: Jeff Parker; Manuel Garcia

In-story information
- Member(s): Giant Girl; Captain America; Storm; Spider-Man; Wolverine; Iron Man; Hulk

Marvel Adventures: The Avengers was a comic book series published by Marvel Comics that began in 2006. The series has no direct relation to the history of the mainstream Avengers comic titles or its characters. Like other Marvel Adventures series, the series is aimed toward younger audiences. The series was canceled in 2010 when the Marvel Adventures line was revamped.

== Avengers ==
- Captain America (Steven "Steve" Rogers) is a super soldier from the second world war who was frozen in ice, but defrosted decades later to join the team. He has greater strength and reflexes, as well as wielding an impenetrable shield. He is the leader of the Avengers. He was created by Joe Simon and Jack Kirby.
- Iron Man (Anthony "Tony" Stark) is a billionaire who wears a suit to ensure that the shrapnel that impaled him during an attack would not reach his heart. At the same time, the suit contains various weapons and has various models. He was created by Stan Lee, Jack Kirby, Don Heck, and Larry Lieber.
- Storm (Ororo Munroe) is a mutant who controls weather, and also creates electricity. She is the second-in-command after Captain America. She previously joined the X-Men. She was created by Len Wein and Dave Cockrum.
- Hulk (Bruce Banner) is the scientist of the group, and turns into a giant, green superhuman after a gamma radiation incident. He was created by Stan Lee and Jack Kirby.
- Wolverine (James "Logan" Howlett) is another mutant who has retractable claws, high sense of smell, hearing, sight, and of course healing factors since birth. He has a painful past as he was a Weapon X test subject, which gave him an adamantium skeleton. He also previously joined the X-Men. The Avengers wonder why he is very grim and selfish at times, but many times his past is the main reason. He was created by Len Wein, Herb Trimpe, and John Romita, Sr.
- Spider-Man (Peter Parker) is a normal graduate and photographer for the Daily Bugle who was bitten by a radioactive spider, and was given wall-crawling, web-shooting, super-strength, reflexes and enhanced agility abilities, and an ability he calls spidey-sense, which he uses to warn him if he is in danger. His origins as Spider-Man resulted when his uncle Ben died. He carries his uncle's last words with him everywhere he goes: "With great power, comes great responsibility." He has a witty sense of humor, and at most times he jokes along with Giant Girl. He was created by Stan Lee and Steve Ditko. Ironically, he was supposed to join the New Avengers.
- Giant-Girl (Janet Van Dyne) is a scientist who, with Pym particles in a machine, grows taller to about sixty feet. She is the strongest of the Avengers having strength enough to hold back landslides and to catch a school flying through the air. She is later, with the help of a new suit, able to shrink down to diminutive size and calls herself Wasp. In this form, she is able to fly, has proportionally superhuman strength, and can fire bio-electrical stings from her hands. Originally, she was vulnerable to insect mind control, due to her suit's insect controlling mask. After being freed from the mind control, she crushes the leader of the dangerous plot with her boot. The suit with these capabilities was eventually replaced, and she eventually receives a new suit that lacks the insect control feature. Giant Girl seems to have humor similar to Spider-Man's, and sees the team as family, even enveloping them in a giant bear hug after nearly crushing them. Instead of primarily using the Wasp identity, she typically uses the Giant-Girl persona. She was created by Stan Lee and Jack Kirby.

== Villains ==
- Ultron is a military-created robot that thinks human minds are evil, thus turning on its creators. It rebelled, but was subdued by the Avengers.
- Leader (Samuel Sterns) is a high school dropout that was caught on the radiation with Bruce Banner and Emil Blonsky, thus turning into the supervillain with an enlarged head of intelligence. Before his radiation, he used to play the lotto and watch daytime TV shows.
- Abomination (Emil Blonsky) is a Russian-American spy who was exposed in the gamma rays with Samuel Sterns and Bruce Banner. He seems to have a tough personality and usually says "ain't".
- Baron Zemo (Helmut Zemo) is the American descendant of the original Baron Zemo and obsessed with defeating Captain America.
- Loki, the archenemy of Thor and Odin, is the prince of mischief and a curious god. He becomes obsessed with wondering how people get their powers and doing good. He then gets multiple gangsters and gives them powers against the Avengers.
- Wrecker (Dirk Garthwaite) is a robber who gets superhuman strength, stamina and durability and a powerful crowbar, all because of Loki, who wishes to test how he fares against the Avengers, although he is eventually stopped.
- U-Foes, or Uncanny Foes, is a team composed of superhumans led by Simon Utrecht, who intentionally wanted to gain superpowers, which makes him and his team craving for that power. They launch into space when there is another cosmic ray appears, so they will do the same like the Fantastic Four's origin. In this version, they attempt to replicate the gamma treatment which turned Bruce Banner into the Hulk, and after receiving their new powers, they wreak havoc. When the U-Foes prove too powerful for the Avengers, Giant Girl crushes them all with her gigantic boot.
  - Vector (Simon Utrecht) is a former business owner of Utrecht International who has all the power, except he wants superpower. He and his team plan to get exposed to the next cosmic rays which proves successful, but was brought down to earth by Bruce Banner and Utrecht International. He possesses the ability to repel matter with vectors of pure kinetic energy. After a battle with the Avengers, he is crushed by Giant Girl.
  - Ironclad (Michael Steel) is a former astronaut and partner to Simon Utrecht, who joins him in the superpower hunt. He was transformed into a form made of iron with superhuman strength. After a battle with the Avengers, he is crushed by Giant Girl.
  - Vapor (Ann Darnell) is a former astronaut and partner of Utrecht who joins Utrecht in the superpower hunt. She can turn into various forms of gas. She is the sister of X-Ray. After a battle with the Avengers, she is crushed by Giant Girl.
  - X-Ray (James Darnell) is a former astronaut and partner of Utrecht who joins Utrecht in the superpower hunt. He is composed of and can generate radiation. After a battle with the Avengers, he is crushed by Giant Girl.
- Juggernaut (Cain Marko) is a previous smuggler. He helps the Avengers save civilians from a storm in South America. He and his guide, Loquito (actually Loki), go to the temple of Cyttorak to get the hidden ruby, which is believed to be expensive. Once he gets the ruby, he turns into a massive superhuman with an indestructible suit. The Avengers manage to stop his rampage in the end.
- M.O.D.O.C., or the Mental Organism Designed Only for Conquest, used to be an A.I.M. agent. They were working on a project and needs a human to complete it, thus he was chosen. He wishes to conquer the world. He turned the Avengers into versions of himself after battling them, but was ultimately stopped, and the Avengers turned back to normal.
- Morgan le Fay is a sorceress back in medieval times who enslaved many people in order to do her bidding. She and the Black Knight formulated a plan to manipulate even more people using the 21st century's technology (via video games). This plan ultimately failed when the Black Knight secretly used this as an opportunity to contact the Avengers for assistance. Morgan le Fay vanishes once her plan fails, telling them they have made a powerful enemy.

== Other characters ==
- Edwin Jarvis is a butler to the Avengers. He secretly has a taste in medieval trivia, although he revealed this to the Avengers when they required information while in Avalon.
- A.I.M. is an organization filled with experimenting scientists who deal in weapons manufacturing and other uses.
- Black Knight is an ally to the Avengers who was originally under the bidding of Morgan le Fay. He contacted them through a video game (World of Slaycraft) in order to be freed. After his former master vanishes, he becomes a friend to the Avengers.
