= Patrick Scherberger =

American comic book penciller

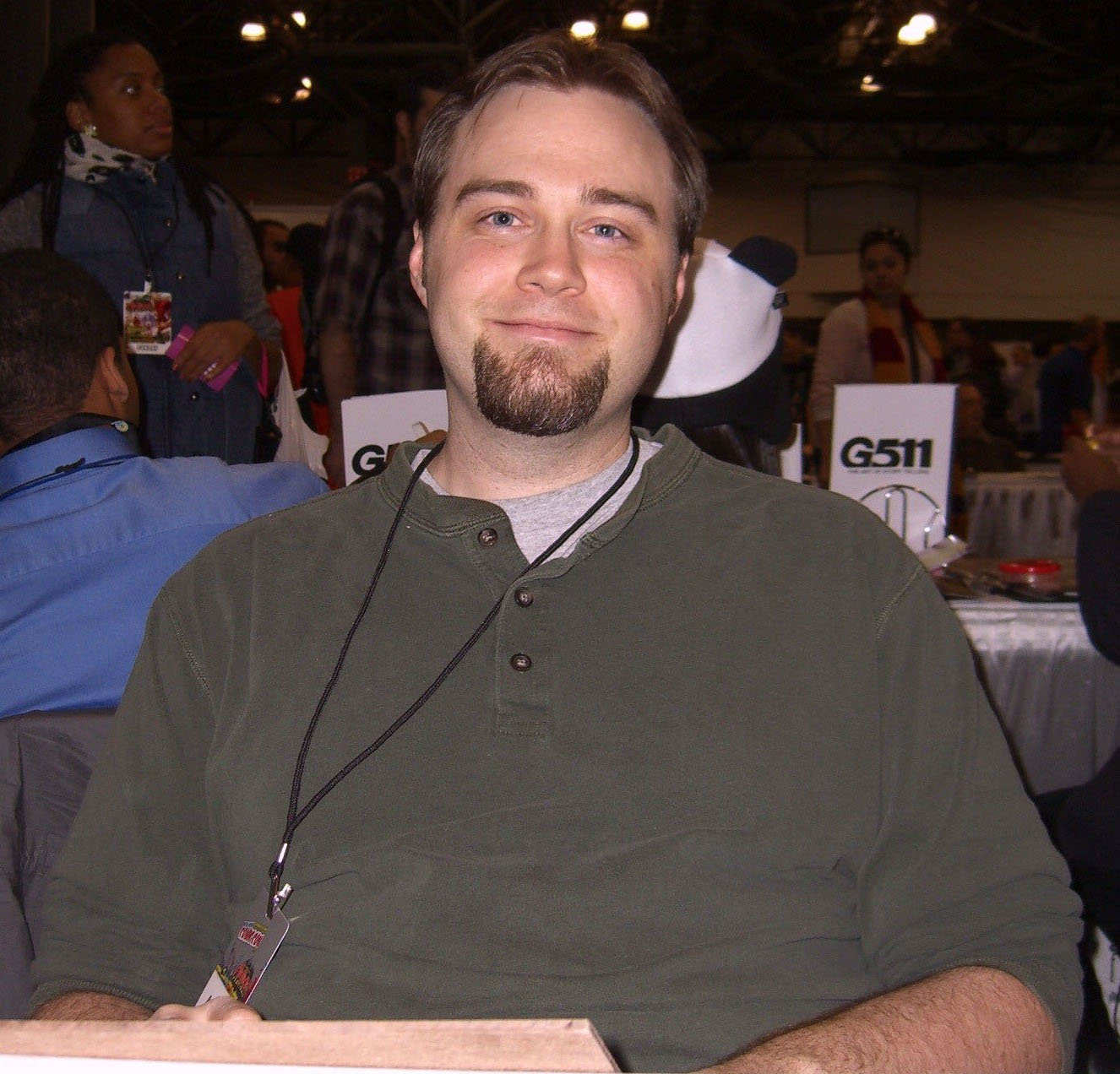
- Scherberger at the New York Comic Con in Manhattan, October 10, 2010.
- Notable works: Marvel Adventures: Spider-Man

Patrick Scherberger is an American comic book penciller, known for his work on the book Marvel Adventures: Spider-Man.

== Career ==
Scherberger's career began when he entered and won an internet competition called Comic Book Idol in 2004. During the competition he was contacted by Joe Quesada to do a formal try-out for Marvel Comics and, as a result of this, was soon chosen to pencil Marvel Adventures: Spider-Man.

== Bibliography ==
- Couch Press Presents #1: "William; Bottom of the Barrel" (Couch Press, 1996)
- Marvel Age: Hulk #1: "Cowboys and Robots" (with Mike Raicht, Marvel Comics, 2004)
- The Path #22: "Men of Honor" (with Ron Marz, CrossGen, 2004)
- Marvel Adventures: Spider-Man (pencils, with Kitty Fross and inks by Norman Lee, Marvel Comics, 2005–2008)
