= Roger Cruz =

Brazilian comic book artist

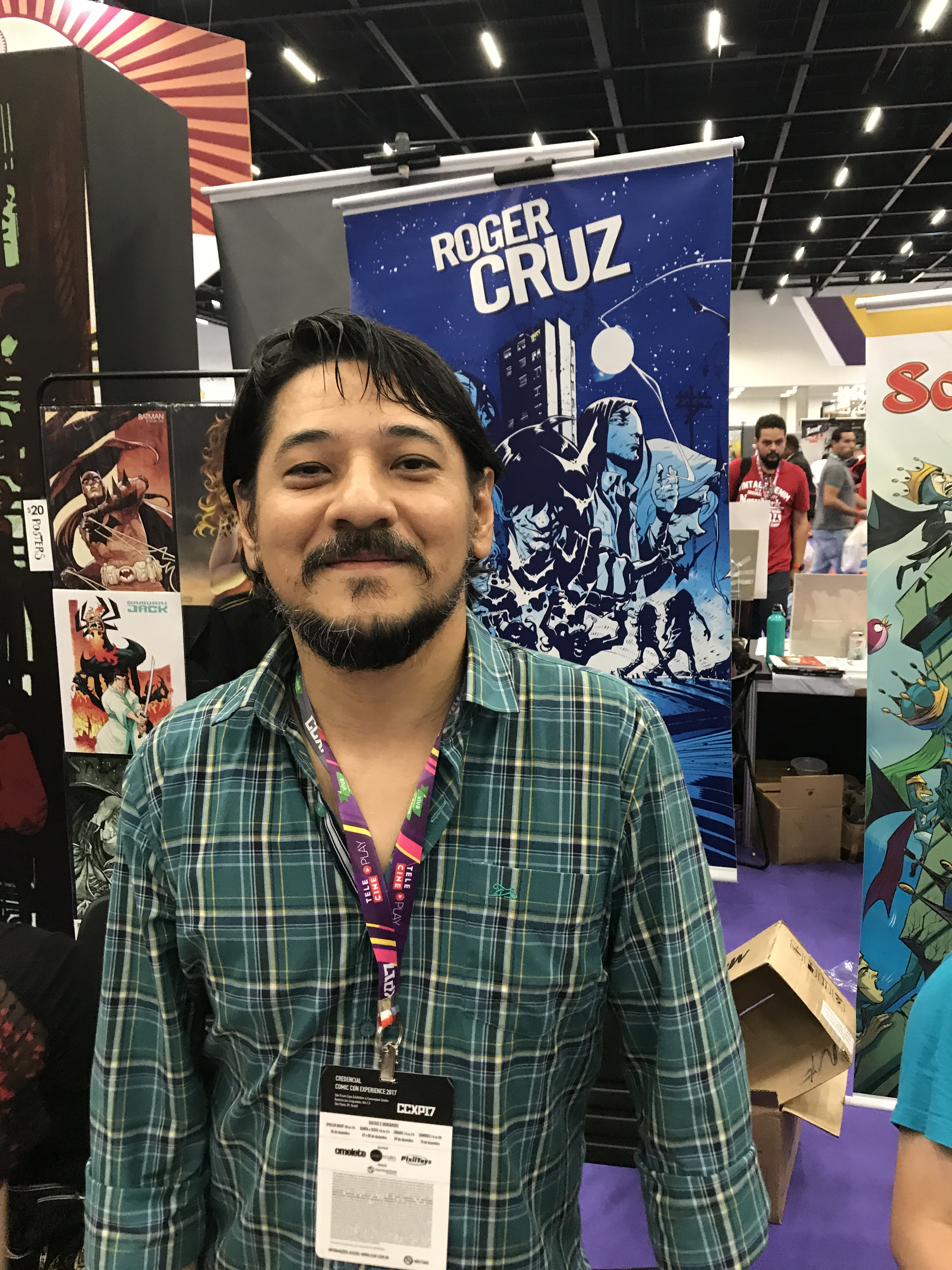
- Born: Rogério da Cruz Kuroda; February 22, 1971 (age 55) São Paulo, Brazil
- Areas: Penciller, Artist, Letterer
- Pseudonym: RoC. K
- Notable works: Uncanny X-Men; X-Man

Roger Cruz (born Rogério da Cruz Kuroda on February 22, 1971, in São Paulo, Brazil) is a Brazilian comic book artist.

== Biography ==
Cruz started his professional career as a letterer for Editora Abril, the Brazilian publishing house, for whom he lettered many Portuguese translations of American comics; then worked as a writer and art assistant for Mil Perigos, a short-lived black and white comics magazine.

When Art & Comics Studio first introduced Brazilian artists to the American comic book market, he was given the opportunity to work as an artist for Marvel Comics on the titles Ghost Rider, Hulk, Uncanny X-Men, X-Men Alpha, X-Patrol, Generation X, X-Calibre, X-Factor, X-Man, Avengers: Timeslide and Silver Surfer. He also worked for DC Comics, where he provided art for one issue of the comic book Batman Chronicles.

At the end of the 1990s, Cruz took a break from working on comic books and returned to Brazil, where he became one of the founders and partners of an art studio/school called Fábrica de Quadrinhos ("Comic Book Factory"; currently named Quanta Academia de Artes). Cruz also worked as a storyboard designer for advertising agencies, a character designer for TV shows, and an art teacher, and gave a two-year course of lectures and workshops in universities.

Still being a Fábrica de Quadrinhos partner, he returned to work for the American market, contributing to Top Cow Productions titles such as The Darkness and Ascension, and Marvel titles like X-Men, Wolverine, and Magneto: Dark Seduction.

In 1999 Cruz gave up his projects in Fábrica de Quadrinhos and returned to work exclusively with comics. In 2002, negotiated by Art & Comics Studio, he illustrated issues of Wonder Woman. From 2004, he worked for Marvel once again, as the artist on Amazing Fantasy and X-Men: First Class.

Since 2019 Cruz published more authorial works in Brazil, such as Xampu- Lovely Losers, Quaisqualingundum (as writer; art by David Calil), based on songs by composer Adoniran Barbosa, A Irmandade Bege e Os Fabulosos, a parody of X-Men.

== Partial bibliography ==
- Uncanny X-Men #315, 318, 320, 324, 327, 376, 473, 474
- X-Factor #106
- Wolverine #89, #147-148
- X-Men #180-181
- Generation X #7-8
- X-Man #21-25, 27–30, 32–35, 41–44, -1
- X-Calibre #2
- X-Men: Alpha/X-Men: Omega
- Incredible Hulk #419
- Brigade #16-17
- Silver Surfer Vol. 2 #138-139
- team youngblood #18-20
- youngblood vol 2: #s 1, 2, 4, 6–11, 14
