= Marvel Adventures =

Marvel Comics imprint

Marvel Adventures, formerly Marvel Age, was an imprint of Marvel Comics intended for younger audiences, including small children. Unlike the standard comics published by Marvel, which often take place in story arcs spanning several issues, each Marvel Adventures comic tells a standalone story. In April 2012 it was replaced by the all new All Ages line tied to the Marvel Universe block on Disney XD.

== History ==
The Marvel Age's superheroes, based on the Marvel Comics' main canon's characters. Cover art of Marvel Adventures: The Avengers #1 (May 2006 Marvel Comics). Art by Aaron Lopresti.

=== Age ===
The idea was initially established as the Marvel Age imprint in 2003. The Marvel Age name had last been used as the title of a promotional magazine published by Marvel from 1983 to 1994. The initial idea for the imprint was to reuse the early plots, written by Stan Lee in the 1960s, in a modern-day setting, with new writers and artists retelling the stories. The stories would be published in the standard comic book format and quickly collected and reprinted in manga-style digest size. Several titles from Marvel's failed Tsunami line, as well as several other Marvel series, were also collected in this format and released under the Marvel Age banner. Each book also contained character concept sketches by the artists on the last pages.

=== Adventures ===
In 2005 Darwyn Cooke was brought on to develop a new all-ages book based on Marvel's heroes. The stories would be independent from the Marvel 616 Universe and feature an array of Marvel's most popular characters. Cooke was eventually left behind by Marvel and the book carried on without him where a new batch of creators were brought on to tell stories Cooke never intended to tell. The Marvel Age imprint was relaunched as Marvel Adventures, with Marvel Age: Spider-Man and Marvel Age: Fantastic Four being restarted as Marvel Adventures: Spider-Man and Marvel Adventures: Fantastic Four. This time around, the stories would be original and not based on existing stories. In order to be able to tell standalone stories and to escape the trappings of having to reflect the events of other Marvel titles, none of the titles take place within the primary Marvel Universe continuity.

The titles published consist of Marvel Adventures: The Avengers, Marvel Adventures: Spider-Man and Marvel Adventures: Super Heroes. Two other titles, Marvel Adventures: Iron Man and Marvel Adventures: Hulk, were both canceled after brief runs. Marvel Adventures: Fantastic Four ended its run, after 48 issues, in May, 2009. It was followed two months later by a Fantastic Four Giant-Size Adventures one-shot.

In 2010, the line was ended and then rebooted with only two titles, Marvel Adventures: Spider-Man and Marvel Adventures: Super Heroes returning. Both titles started over with a new first issue. Both titles ended in March 2012, and were replaced by new titles tied to the "Marvel Universe" cartoon block on Disney XD, and are titled Ultimate Spider-Man Adventures and The Avengers: Earth's Mightiest Heroes Adventures, respectively.

== Digests ==
Marvel Digests were collections of Marvel Age/Adventures comic books compressed into smaller digest-sized books, rather than the original larger magazine form. Following theme with the Marvel Age comic books, they contained concept art sketches of characters in the back of the books.

=== Marvel Age Fantastic Four ===
- Marvel Age Fantastic Four Vol. 1: All for One (Marvel Age Fantastic Four #1-4)
- Marvel Age Fantastic Four Vol. 2: Doom (Marvel Age Fantastic Four #5-8)
- Marvel Age Fantastic Four Vol. 3: Return of Doctor Doom (Marvel Age Fantastic Four #9-12)

=== Marvel Age Fantastic Four Tales ===
- Marvel Age Fantastic Four: Clobberin' Time (Marvel Age Fantastic Four Tales #1, Tales of the Thing #1-3, Spider-Man Team-Up Special #1)

=== Marvel Age Hulk ===
- Marvel Age Hulk: Incredible (Marvel Age Hulk #1-4)

=== Marvel Age Spider-Man ===
- Marvel Age Spider-Man Vol. 1: Fearsome Foes (Marvel Age Spider-Man #1-4)
- Marvel Age Spider-Man Vol. 2: Everyday Hero (Marvel Age Spider-Man #5-8)
- Marvel Age Spider-Man Vol. 3: Swingtime (Marvel Age Spider-Man #9-12)
- Marvel Age Spider-Man Vol. 4: The Goblin Strikes (Marvel Age Spider-Man #13-16)
- Marvel Age Spider-Man Vol. 5: Spidey Strikes Back (Marvel Age Spider-Man #17-20)

=== Marvel Age Spider-Man Team-Up ===
- Marvel Age Spider-Man Team-Up Vol. 1: A Little Help From My Friends (Marvel Age Spider-Man Team-Up #1-5)

=== Mary Jane ===
- Mary Jane Vol. 1: Circle of Friends (Mary Jane #1-4)
- Mary Jane Vol. 2: Homecoming (Mary Jane: Homecoming #1-4)
- Spider-Man Loves Mary Jane Vol. 1: Super Crush (Spider-Man Loves Mary Jane Vol. 1 #1-5)
- Spider-Man Loves Mary Jane Vol. 2: The New Girl (Spider-Man Loves Mary Jane Vol. 1 #6-10)
- Spider-Man Loves Mary Jane Vol. 3: My Secret Life (Spider-Man Loves Mary Jane Vol. 1 #11-15)
- Spider-Man Loves Mary Jane Vol. 4: Still Friends (Spider-Man Loves Mary Jane Vol. 1 #16-20)
- Spider-Man Loves Mary Jane Vol. 5: Sophomore Jinx (Spider-Man Loves Mary Jane Vol. 2 #1-5)
- Spider-Man Loves Mary Jane The Complete Collection Vol. 1 (Mary Jane #1-4, Mary Jane: Homecoming #1-4, Spider-Man Loves Mary Jane Vol 1. #1-8)

=== Marvel Adventures Avengers ===
- Marvel Adventures Avengers Vol. 1: Heroes Assembled (Marvel Adventures Avengers #1–4)
- Marvel Adventures Avengers Vol. 2: Mischief (Marvel Adventures Avengers #5-8)
- Marvel Adventures Avengers Vol. 3: Bizarre Adventures (Marvel Adventures Avengers #9-12)
- Marvel Adventures Avengers Vol. 4: The Dream Team (Marvel Adventures Avengers #13-15, Marvel Adventures Giant-Size Avengers #1)
- Marvel Adventures Avengers Vol. 5: Some Assembling Required (Marvel Adventures Avengers #16-19)
- Marvel Adventures Avengers Vol. 6: Mighty Marvels (Marvel Adventures Avengers #20-23)
- Marvel Adventures Avengers Vol. 7: Weirder And Wilder (Marvel Adventures Avengers #24-27)
- Marvel Adventures Avengers Vol. 8: The New Recruits (Marvel Adventures Avengers #28-31)
- Marvel Adventures Avengers Vol. 9: The Times They Are A-Changin'(Marvel Adventures Avengers #32-35)
- Marvel Adventures Avengers Vol. 10: Invasion (Marvel Adventures Avengers #36-39)
- Avengers & The Infinity Gauntlet (Avengers & The Infinity Gauntlet #1-4, Infinity Gauntlet #1)

=== Marvel Adventures Hulk ===
- Marvel Adventures Hulk Vol. 1: Misunderstood Monster (Marvel Adventures Hulk #1-4)
- Marvel Adventures Hulk Vol. 2: Defenders (Marvel Adventures Hulk #5-8)
- Marvel Adventures Hulk Vol. 3: Strongest One There Is (Marvel Adventures Hulk #9-12)
- Marvel Adventures Hulk Vol. 4: Tales To Astonish (Marvel Adventures Hulk #13-16)

=== Marvel Adventures Iron Man ===
- Marvel Adventures Iron Man Vol. 1: Heart of Steel (Marvel Adventures Iron Man #1-4)
- Marvel Adventures Iron Man Vol. 2: Iron Armory (Marvel Adventures Iron Man #5-8)
- Marvel Adventures Iron Man Vol. 3: Hero by Design (Marvel Adventures Iron Man #9-12)
- Marvel Adventures Iron Man Vol. 4: Armored Avenger (Marvel Adventures Iron Man #13, Iron Man: Golden Avenger #1, Marvel Adventures Iron Man & Hulk: FCBD 2007, and Marvel Adventures Iron Man, Hulk, & Spider-Man: FCBD 2008)

=== Marvel Adventures Fantastic Four ===
- Marvel Adventures Fantastic Four Vol. 1: Family of Heroes (Marvel Adventures Fantastic Four #1-4)
- Marvel Adventures Fantastic Four Vol. 2: Fantastic Voyages (Marvel Adventures Fantastic Four #5-8)
- Marvel Adventures Fantastic Four Vol. 3: World's Greatest (Marvel Adventures Fantastic Four #9-12)
- Marvel Adventures Fantastic Four Vol. 4: Cosmic Threats (Marvel Adventures Fantastic Four #13-16)
- Marvel Adventures Fantastic Four Vol. 5: All 4 One, 4 for All (Marvel Adventures Fantastic Four #17-20)
- Marvel Adventures Fantastic Four Vol. 6: Monsters and Mysteries (Marvel Adventures Fantastic Four #21-24)
- Marvel Adventures Fantastic Four Vol. 7: The Silver Surfer (Marvel Adventures Fantastic Four #25-28)
- Marvel Adventures Fantastic Four Vol. 8: Monsters, Moles, Cowboys & Coupons (Marvel Adventures Fantastic Four #29-32)
- Marvel Adventures Fantastic Four Vol. 9: New York's Finest (Marvel Adventures Fantastic Four #33-36)
- Marvel Adventures Fantastic Four Vol. 10: Spaced Crusaders (Marvel Adventures Fantastic Four #37-40)
- Marvel Adventures Fantastic Four Vol. 11: Doomed If You Don't (Marvel Adventures Fantastic Four #41-44)
- Marvel Adventures Fantastic Four Vol. 12: Four-Three-Two-One (Marvel Adventures Fantastic Four #45-48)

=== Marvel Adventures Spider-Man ===
- Marvel Adventures Spider-Man Vol. 1: The Sinister Six (Marvel Adventures Spider-Man #1–4)
- Marvel Adventures Spider-Man Vol. 2: Power Struggle (Marvel Adventures Spider-Man #5–8)
- Marvel Adventures Spider-Man Vol. 3: Doom with a View (Marvel Adventures Spider-Man #9–12)
- Marvel Adventures Spider-Man Vol. 4: Concrete Jungle (Marvel Adventures Spider-Man #13–16)
- Marvel Adventures Spider-Man Vol. 5: Monsters on the Prowl (Marvel Adventures Spider-Man #17-20)
- Marvel Adventures Spider-Man Vol. 6: The Black Costume (Marvel Adventures Spider-Man #21-24)
- Marvel Adventures Spider-Man Vol. 7: Secret Identity (Marvel Adventures Spider-Man #25-28)
- Marvel Adventures Spider-Man Vol. 8: Forces of Nature (Marvel Adventures Spider-Man #29-32)
- Marvel Adventures Spider-Man Vol. 9: Fiercest Foes (Marvel Adventures Spider-Man #33-36)
- Marvel Adventures Spider-Man Vol. 10: Identity Crisis (Marvel Adventures Spider-Man #37-40)
- Marvel Adventures Spider-Man Vol. 11: Animal Instinct (Marvel Adventures Spider-Man #41-44)
- Marvel Adventures Spider-Man Vol. 12: Jumping To Conclusions (Marvel Adventures Spider-Man #45-48)
- Marvel Adventures Spider-Man Vol. 13: Animal Attack! (Marvel Adventures Spider-Man #49-52)
- Marvel Adventures Spider-Man Vol. 14: Thwip! (Marvel Adventures Spider-Man #53-56)
- Marvel Adventures Iron Man/Spider-Man (Marvel Adventures Spider-Man #57, Marvel Adventures Iron Man #1, Iron Man #234, and Marvel Team-Up #9)
- Marvel Adventures Spider-Man Vol. 15: Peter Parker vs. The X-Men (Marvel Adventures Spider-Man #58-61)

=== Marvel Adventures Spider-Man (vol. 2) ===
- Marvel Adventures Spider-Man: Amazing (Marvel Adventures Spider-Man vol. 2 #1-4)
- Marvel Adventures Spider-Man: Spectacular (Marvel Adventures Spider-Man vol. 2 #5-8)
- Marvel Adventures Spider-Man: Sensational (Marvel Adventures Spider-Man vol. 2 #9-12)
- Marvel Adventures Spider-Man: Friendly Neighborhood (Marvel Adventures Spider-Man vol. 2 #13-16)
- Marvel Adventures Spider-Man: Tangled Web (Marvel Adventures Spider-Man vol. 2 #17-20)
- Marvel Universe Spider-Man: Amazing Fantasy (Marvel Adventures Spider-Man vol. 2 #21-24)

=== Marvel Adventures Super Heroes ===
- Marvel Adventures Spider-Man/Iron Man/Hulk: Triple Threat (Marvel Adventures Super Heroes #1-4)
- Marvel Adventures Thor Featuring Dr. Strange, Ant-Man And Captain America (Marvel Adventures Super Heroes #5-8)
- Marvel Adventures Thor & The Avengers (Marvel Adventures Super Heroes #9-12)
- Marvel Adventures Spider-Man & The Avengers (Marvel Adventures Super Heroes #13-16)
- Marvel Adventures Black Widow & The Avengers (Marvel Adventures Super Heroes #17-21)

=== Marvel Adventures Super Heroes (vol. 2) ===
- Marvel Adventures Avengers: Iron Man (Marvel Adventures Super Heroes vol. 2 #1-4)
- Marvel Adventures Avengers: Thor (Marvel Adventures Super Heroes vol. 2 #5-8)
- Marvel Adventures Avengers: Hulk (Marvel Adventures Super Heroes vol. 2 #9-12)
- Marvel Adventures Avengers: Thor & Captain America (Marvel Adventures Super Heroes vol. 2 #13-16)
- Marvel Universe Avengers: United (Marvel Adventures Super Heroes vol. 2 #17 & 19, and Marvel Adventures Avengers #1-2)
- Marvel Universe Avengers: Hulk & Fantastic Four (Marvel Adventures Super Heroes vol. 2 #21-24)

Note: Marvel Adventures Super Heroes #18 and 20 are not collected because they are reprints, of Marvel Adventures Iron Man #2 and Marvel Adventures Fantastic Four #10 respectively

=== Various series ===
- Marvel Adventures Avengers: Captain America (Marvel Adventures Super Heroes vol. 2 #8 & 12, Marvel Age Spider-Man Team-Up #2, and Captain America #255)
- Marvel Adventures Thor: Bringers of the Storm (Marvel Adventures Super Heroes #7 & 11 and Marvel Adventures Avengers #5 & 15)
- Marvel Adventures Thor/Spider-Man (Marvel Age Spider-Man Team-Up #4, Marvel Adventures Spider-Man #40, Marvel Team-Up #115-116, and Thor #391)
- Marvel Universe: Spider-Man and The Avengers (Marvel Adventures Avengers #8 and 15, Marvel Adventures Spider-Man #16 and Marvel Age Spider-Man #5)

== See also ==
- List of Marvel Digests
