= List of Marvel Comics superhero debuts =

Lists of the debut appearances of superhero characters by Marvel Comics. The very first Marvel superhero was Namor the Sub-Mariner, who made his debut in 1939.

== Debuts ==
=== 1939–1949 ===
Real name / Team / Series	Codename	Year debuted	Creator/s	First appearance
Namor McKenzie	Sub-Mariner	1939 (April)	Bill Everett	Motion Picture Funnies Weekly #1
Perry Webb	American Ace	1939 (April)	Paul Lauretta	Motion Picture Funnies Weekly #1
Jim Gardley	Masked Raider	1939 (August)	Al Anders	Marvel Comics #1
Jim Hammond	Human Torch	1939 (October)	Carl Burgos	Marvel Comics #1
Thomas Halloway	Angel	1939 (October)	Paul Gustavson	Marvel Comics #1
David Rand	Ka-Zar	1939 (October)	Bob Byrd, Ben Thompson	Marvel Comics #1
Jack Castle	Fiery Mask	1939 (October)	Joe Simon	Daring Mystery Comics #1
John Steele		1939 (October)	Larry Antonette	Daring Mystery Comics #1
Monako		1939 (October)	Larry Antonette	Daring Mystery Comics #1
Robert Foster	Flash Foster	1939 (October)	Bob Wood	Daring Mystery Comics #1
Allan Lewis	Phantom Bullet	1939 (December)	Joe Simon	Daring Mystery Comics #2
Trojak		1939 (December)	Joe Simon	Daring Mystery Comics #2
Victor Jay	Mister E	1939 (December)	Joe Cal Cagno, Al Carreno	Daring Mystery Comics #2
Dennis Burton	Laughing Mask	1939 (December)	Will Harr, Maurice Gutwirth	Daring Mystery Comics #2
Electro		1939 (December)	Steve Dahlman	Marvel Mystery Comics #4
Dennis Piper	Ferret	1939 (December)	Stockbridge Winslow, Irwin Hasen	Marvel Mystery Comics #4
Flexo		1940 (January)	Will Harr, Jack Binder	Mystic Comics #1
Spencer Keen	Blue Blaze	1940 (January)	Harry Douglas	Mystic Comics #1
Marvex		1940 (February)	Allen Simon	Daring Mystery Comics #3
Richard Jones	Phantom Reporter	1940 (April)	Robert O. Erisman, Sam Cooper	Daring Mystery Comics #3
Claire Voyant	Black Widow	1940 (August)	George Kapitan, Harry Gahle	Mystic Comics #4
Makkari; Zuras and Thena (former Azura)	Mercury (Makkari), Jupiter (Zuras), Minerva (Thena)	1940 (August)	Martin A. Burnstein, Jack Kirby	Red Raven Comics #1
Bruce Dickson	Thin Man	1940 (August)	Klaus Nordling	Mystic Comics #4
Thomas "Tommy" Raymond	Toro	1940 (September)	Carl Burgos	Human Torch Comics #2
Aarkus	Vision	1940 (November)	Joe Simon, Jack Kirby	Marvel Mystery Comics #13
Steven "Steve" Rogers	Currently: Captain America; Formerly: Nomad	1941 (March)	Joe Simon, Jack Kirby	Captain America Comics #1
James Buchanan "Bucky" Barnes	Currently: Winter Soldier; Former: Captain America, Bucky	1941 (March)	Joe Simon, Jack Kirby	Captain America Comics #1
Daniel "Dan" Lyons	Black Marvel	1941 (March)	Al Gabriele	Mystic Comics #5
Elizabeth "Betty/Betsy" Ross Mace	Currently: Golden Girl; Former: Agent R, Agent X-13	1941 (March)	Joe Simon, Jack Kirby	Captain America Comics #1
Mark Anthony Todd	Blazing Skull	1941 (March)	Bob Davis	Mystic Comics #5
Jeffrey Solomon Mace	Patriot	1941 (April)	Ray Gill, George Mandel	Human Torch Comics #4
Jerry Carstairs	Thunderer	1941 (April)	John Compton, Carl Burgos	Daring Mystery #7
Elizabeth "Betsy" Barstow	Silver Scorpion	1941 (April)	Harry Sahle	Daring Mystery #7
Daniel Rose	Rockman	1941 (April)	Basil Wolverton, Charles Nicholas	U.S.A. Comics #1
Robert Frank	Whizzer	1941 (August)	Al Avison	USA Comics #1
Kevin "Keen" Marlow	Destroyer	1941 (October)	Stan Lee, Jack Binder	Mystic Comics #6
Witness		1941 (December)	Stan Lee	Mystic Comics #7
Madeline Joyce-Frank	Miss America	1943 (November)	Otto Binder, Al Gabriele	Marvel Mystery Comics #49
Mary Morgan-Morgenstern	Miss Patriot	1943 (December)	Ray Gill, Sid Greene	Marvel Mystery Comics #50
Louise Grant-Mason	Blonde Phantom	1946 (September)	Stan Lee, Syd Shores	All-Select Comics #117
Aquaria Nautica Neptunia	Namora	1947 (May)	Ken Bald, Bob Powell	Marvel Mystery Comics #82
Mary Mitchell	Sun Girl	1948 (August)	Ken Bald, Stan Lee	Sun Girl #1
Aphrodite Ourania 'or' Pandemos	Venus	1948 (August)	Stan Lee, Ken Bald	Venus #1
Clay Harder	Two-Gun Kid	1948 (January)	Syd Shores, Vince Alascia	Two-Gun Kid #1
Annie (no last name)	Arizona Annie	1948 (February)	Mike Sekowsky, Frank Giacoia	Wild West #1
Blaine Colt	Kid Colt	1948 (August)	Pete Tumlinson	Kid Colt #1
Matthew Masters	Black Rider	1948 (December)	Syd Shores	All Winners #2

=== 1950s ===
Real Name / Team / Series	Codename	Year Debuted	Creator/s	First Appearance
Robert Grayson (former Grabshied)	Currently: Uranian; Former: Marvel Boy	1950 (December)	Stan Lee, Russ Heath	Marvel Boy #1
Frankenstein's Monster		1953 (September)	Stan Lee, Joe Maneely	Menace #7
Jack Monroe	Currently: Nomad; Formerly: Bucky	1953 (December)	Russ Heath	Young Men #24
Michael Moran	Miracleman/ Marvelman	1954 (February)	Mick Anglo	Marvelman #25
Kenneth Hale	Gorilla Man	1954 (March)	Robert Q. Sale	VMen's Adventures #26
M-11	Human Robot	1954 (May)	Stan Lee, John Romita	Menace #11
Lance Temple	Outlaw Kid	1954 (September)	Doug Wildey	Outlaw Kid #1
Jimmy Woo		1956 (October)	Al Feldstein, Joe Maneely	Yellow Claw #1

=== 1960s ===
Real Name / Team / Series	Codename	Year Debuted	Creator/s	First Appearance
Jonathan Clay (Bart)	Rawhide Kid	1960 (August)	Stan Lee, Bob Brown	Rawhide Kid #17
Groot		1960 (November)	Stan Lee, Jack Kirby, Larry Lieber	Tales to Astonish #13
Anthony Druid (former Ludgate)	Doctor Druid	1961 (June)	Stan Lee, Jack Kirby	Amazing Adventures #1
Team:The Fantastic Four; Members; Reed Richards; Susan Storm-Richards; Jonathan Lowell Spencer "Johnny" Storm and Benjamin Jacob "Ben" Grimm	Reed: Mister Fantastic; Susan: (Currently: Invisible Woman/ Formerly: Captain Universe, Invisible Girl, Malice); Johnny: (Currently: The Human Torch/ Formerly: Invisible Boy) and Ben: (Currently: The Thing/ Formerly: Angrir)	1961 (November)	Stan Lee, Jack Kirby	Fantastic Four #1
Henry Jonathan "Hank" Pym	Currently: Ultron; Former: Ant-Man, Giant-Man, Goliath and Yellowjacket	1960	Stan Lee, Jack Kirby	Strange Tales #75
Robert Bruce Banner	Currently: The Hulk; Formerly: Joe Fixit, Doc Green, Grey Hulk, Nul	1962 (May)	Stan Lee, Jack Kirby	The Incredible Hulk #1
Elizabeth "Betty" Ross-Talbot-Banner	Currently: Harpy; Former: Red She Hulk	1962 (May)	Stan Lee, Jack Kirby	The Incredible Hulk #1
Peter Benjamin Parker	Currently: Spider-Man; Formerly: Ricochet, Hornet, Dusk, Prodigy, Black Marvel, Daredevil, Captain Universe, Iron Spider, Venom, Spider-Hulk,	1962 (August)	Stan Lee, Steve Ditko	Amazing Fantasy #15
Thor		1962 (August)	Stan Lee, Jack Kirby	Journey into Mystery #83
Balder the Brave		1962 (October)	Stan Lee, Jack Kirby	Journey into Mystery #85
Heimdall		1962 (October)	Stan Lee, Jack Kirby	Journey into Mystery #85
Matthew Hawk (former Matthew Leibowitz)	Two-Gun Kid	1962 (November)	Stan Lee, Jack Kirby	Two-Gun Kid #60
Anthony Edward "Tony" Stark	Iron Man	1963 (March)	Stan Lee, Jack Kirby, Don Heck	Tales of Suspense #39
John Jonah Jameson III	Currently: Man-Wolf; Former: Stargod, Vanwolf, Skywolf	1963 (March)	Stan Lee, Steve Ditko	Amazing Spider-Man #1
Team: The Howling Commandos; Members; Nick Fury, Izzy Cohen, Dum Dum Dugan, Robert "Rebel" Ralston, Gabriel "Gabe" Jones, Jonathan Juniper, Dino Manelli, and Happy Sam Sawyer		1963 (May)	Stan Lee, Jack Kirby	Sgt. Fury and his Howling Commandos #1
Janet Van Dyne	Wasp	1963 (June)	Stan Lee, Jack Kirby, Ernie Hart	Tales to Astonish #44
Sersi		1963 (June)	Stan Lee, Robert Bernstein, Jack Kirby	Strange Tales #109
Stephen Vincent Strange	Doctor Strange	1963 (July)	Stan Lee, Steve Ditko	Strange Tales #110
Yao and Wong	Yao: Ancient One	1963 (June)	Larry Lieber, Jack Kirby, Stan Lee, Steve Ditko	Strange Tales #110
Team:The X-Men; Members: Charles Francis Xavier; Scott Summers; Robert Louis "Bobby" Drake; Warren Kenneth Worthington III; Henry Philip "Hank" McCoy and Jean Elaine Grey-Summers	Charles:Currently: X/Former: Professor X Scott: Cyclops; Bobby: Iceman; Warren: Angel/ Archangel; Hank: Beast; Jean: Currently: Marvel Girl; Former: Phoenix, Dark Phoenix	1963 (September)	Stan Lee, Jack Kirby	The X-Men #1
Virginia "Pepper" Potts	Rescue	1963 (September)	Stan Lee, Robert Bernstein, Don Heck	Tales of Suspense #45
Team: The Avengers; Members; Hank Pym (as Ant-Man), Hulk, Iron Man, Thor and Wasp		1963 (September)	Stan Lee, Jack Kirby	The Avengers #1
Natalia Alianovna Romanova	Black Widow	1964 (January)	Stan Lee, Don Rico, Don Heck	Tales of Suspense #52
Pietro Django Maximoff and Wanda Maximoff	Pietro: Quicksilver; Wanda: Scarlet Witch	1964 (March)	Stan Lee, Jack Kirby	The X-Men #4
Sif		1964 (March)	Stan Lee, Jack Kirby	Journey into Mystery #102
Matthew Michael "Matt" Murdock	Daredevil	1964 (April)	Stan Lee, Bill Everett	Daredevil #1
Abner Jenkins	Beetle, MACH-1, MACH-2, MACH-3, MACH-IV, MACH-V, MACH-VII, MACH-X	1964 (August)	Stan Lee, Carl Burgos	Strange Tales #123
Clinton Francis "Clint" Barton	Currently: Hawkeye; Former: Goliath, Ronin	1964 (September)	Stan Lee, Don Heck	Tales of Suspense #57
Simon Williams	Wonder Man	1964 (October)	Stan Lee, Jack Kirby, Don Heck	Avengers #9
Clea Strange		1964 (November)	Stan Lee, Steve Ditko	Strange Tales #126
Kevin Plunder	Ka-Zar	1965 (March)	Stan Lee, Jack Kirby	The X-Men #10
Zabu		1965 (March)	Stan Lee, Jack Kirby	The X-Men #10
Medusalith Amaquelin	Medusa	1965 (March)	Stan Lee, Jack Kirby	Fantastic Four #36
Organization:S.H.I.E.L.D.		1965 (August)	Stan Lee, Jack Kirby	Strange Tales #135
Jacques Duquesne	Swordsman	1965 (August)	Stan Lee, Don Heck	The Avengers #19
The Warriors Three; Fandral, Hogun, and Volstagg		1965 (August)	Stan Lee, Jack Kirby	Journey into Mystery #119
Hercules		1965 (October)	Stan Lee, Jack Kirby	Journey into Mystery Annual #1
Erik Stephan Josten	Currently: Atlas; Former:Power Man, Smuggler, Goliath	1965 (October)	Stan Lee, Don Heck	The Avengers #21
The Inhumans; Members: Medusa; Crystallia Amaquelin; Lockjaw; Karnak; Gorgon; Triton and Blackagar Boltagon	Crystallia: Crystal; Blackagar Bolt: Black Bolt	1965 (December)	Stan Lee, Jack Kirby	Fantastic Four #44 and #45
Eric Koenig		1966 (February)	Stan Lee, Dick Ayers	Sgt. Fury and his Howling Commandos vol. 1 #27
Norrin Radd	Silver Surfer	1966 (March)	Jack Kirby	Fantastic Four #48
Sharon Carter	Agent 13	1966 (March)	Stan Lee, Jack Kirby, Dick Ayers	Tales of Suspense #75
Calvin Montgomery Rankin	Mimic	1966 (April)	Stan Lee, Werner Roth	X-Men #19
Margaret "Peggy" Carter	Dryad	1966 (May)	Stan Lee, Jack Kirby	Tales of Suspense #77
T'Challa	Black Panther	1966 (July)	Stan Lee, Jack Kirby	Fantastic Four #52
William "Bill" Foster	Currently: Giant-Man; Former: Black Goliath, Giant-Man	1966 (September)	Stan Lee, Don Heck	The Avengers #32
Sean Cassidy	Banshee	1967 (January)	Roy Thomas, Werner Roth	The X-Men #28
Carter Slade	Phantom Rider	1967 (February)	Gary Friedrich, Dick Ayers, Roy Thomas	Ghost Rider #1
Valentina Allegra de Fontaine		1967 (August)	Jim Steranko	Strange Tales #159
Alexi Shostakov	Currently: Red Guardian; Former: Ronin	1967 (August)	Roy Thomas, John Buscema	The Avengers #43
Adam Warlock	Warlock	1967(September)	Roy Thomas, Gil Kane	Fantastic Four #66 as Him/Marvel Premiere #1
Dane Whitman	Black Knight	1967 (December)	Roy Thomas, John Buscema	The Avengers #47
Mar-Vell	Captain Marvel	1967 (December)	Stan Lee, Gene Colan	Marvel Super-Heroes #12
Clay Quartermain		1967 (December)	Jim Steranko	Strange Tales #163
Carol Susan Jane Danvers (Human name); Car-Ell (Kree name)	Currently: Captain Marvel; Former: Ms. Marvel, Binary, Warbird	1968 (March)	Roy Thomas, Gene Colan	Marvel Super-Heroes #13
Vision		1968 (October)	Roy Thomas, John Buscema	The Avengers #57
Lorna Sally Dane	Currently: Polaris; Former: Magnetrix	1968 (October)	Arnold Drake, Don Heck	The X-Men #49
Team:The Guardians of the Galaxy Members; Charlie-27; Vance Astro, former Astrovik; Martinex and Yondu	Vance: Major Victory	1969 (January)	Arnold Drake, Gene Colan	Marvel Super Heroes #18
Alexander "Alex" Summers	Havok	1969 (March)	Arnold Drake, Don Heck, Neal Adams	The X-Men #54
Samuel Thomas "Sam" Wilson and Redwing	Currently: Falcon; Former: Captain America	1969 (September)	Stan Lee, Gene Colan	Captain America #117
Kyle Richmond	Nighthawk	1969 (October)	Roy Thomas, Sal Buscema	Avengers #69
Hobie Brown	Prowler	1969 (November)	Stan Lee, John Buscema, Jim Mooney	The Amazing Spider-Man #78
Walter Newell	Stingray	1969 (November)	Roy Thomas, Marie Severin	Sub-Mariner #19
Team:Invaders (Captain America, Sub-Mariner and Human Torch (android))		1969 (December)	Roy Thomas, Sal Buscema, Frank Robbins	The Avengers #71

=== 1970s ===
Real Name / Team / Series	Codename	Year Debuted	Creator/s	First Appearance
Shiro Yoshida (吉田 四郎 Yoshida Shirō)	Sunfire	1970 (January)	Roy Thomas, Don Heck	The X-Men #64
Arkon	The Magnificent	1970 (April)	Roy Thomas, John Buscema	Avengers #75
William Talltrees	Red Wolf	1970 (September)	Roy Thomas, John Buscema	The Avengers #80
Conan of Cimmeria	The Barbarian	1970 (October)	Robert E. Howard, Roy Thomas, Barry Windsor-Smith	Conan the Barbarian #1
Brunnhilde	Valkyrie	1970 (December)	Roy Thomas, John Buscema	The Avengers #83
Theodore "Ted" Sallis	Man-Thing	1971 (May)	Roy Thomas, Gerry Conway, Gray Morrow	Savage Tales #1
Barbara "Bobbi" Morse	Mockingbird	1971 (June)	Len Wein, Neal Adams	Astonishing Tales #6
Leonard Skivorski Jr.	Doc Samson	1971 (July)	Roy Thomas, Herb Trimpe	Incredible Hulk #141
Michael Morbius	Morbius, the Living Vampire	1971 (October)	Roy Thomas, Gil Kane	The Amazing Spider-Man #101
Team:The Defenders Members: Doctor Strange, Namor, and Hulk		1971 (December)	Roy Thomas, Ross Andru	Marvel Feature #1
Jack Russell (former Russoff)	Werewolf by Night	1972 (February)	Roy Thomas, Gerry Conway, Mike Ploog	Marvel Spotlight #2
Namorita "Nita" Prentiss	Currently: Namorita; Formerly: Kymaera, Tigress Shark	1972 (June)	Bill Everett	Sub-Mariner #50
Luke Cage (former Carl Lucas)	Formerly: Power Man	1972 (June)	Archie Goodwin, George Tuska	Luke Cage, Hero for Hire #1
Johnathon "Johnny" Blaze	Ghost Rider	1972 (August)	Roy Thomas, Gary Friedrich, Mike Ploog	Marvel Spotlight #5
Greer Grant Nelson	Currently: Tigra Former: The Cat	1972 (November)	Roy Thomas, Wally Wood, Jenny Blake Isabella, Gil Kane, Don Perlin, John Romita Sr., Marie Severin	Claws of the Cat #1
Shanna O'Hara-Plunder	Shanna the She-Devil	1972 (December)	Phil Seuling, George Tuska	Shanna the She-Devil #1
Jennifer "Jenny" Kale		1972 (December)	Steve Gerber, Rich Buckler	Fear #11
Thundra		1972 (December)	Roy Thomas, Gerry Conway	Fantastic Four #129
Heather Douglas	Moondragon	1973 (January)	Bill Everett, Mike Friedrich, George Tuska	Iron Man #54
Arthur Douglas	Drax the Destroyer	1973 (February)	Mike Friedrich, Jim Starlin	Iron Man #55
Eros	Starfox	1973 (February)	Mike Friedrich, Jim Starlin	Iron Man #55
Mantis		1973 (June)	Steve Englehart, Don Heck	The Avengers #112
Eric Stokes Brooks	Blade	1973 (July)	Marv Wolfman, Gene Colan	The Tomb of Dracula #10
N'Kantu	The Living Mummy	1973 (August)	Steve Gerber, Rich Buckler	Supernatural Thrillers #5
Tilda Johnson	Currently: Nighthawk; Former: Nightshade	1973 (August)	Steve Englehart, Alan Weiss	Captain America #164
Jericho Drumm	Currently: Doctor Voodoo; Former: Brother Voodoo	1973 (September)	Len Wein, Gene Colan	Strange Tales #169
Daimon Hellstrom	The Son of Satan, Hellstorm	1973 (September)	Gary Friedrich, Tom Sutton	Ghost Rider #1
Satana Hellstrom	Satana	1973 (October)	Roy Thomas, John Romita Sr.	Vampire Tales #2
Howard the Duck	Howard Duckson	1973 (December)	Steve Gerber, Val Mayerik	Fear #19
Shang-Chi		1973 (December)	Steve Englehart, Jim Starlin	Special Marvel Edition #15
Topaz		1974 (January)	Marv Wolfman, Mike Ploog	Werewolf By Night #13
Frank G. Castle (former Francis Castiglione)	Currently: The Punisher; Formerly: Franken-Castle	1974 (February)	Gerry Conway, Ross Andru	The Amazing Spider-Man #129
Daniel Thomas "Danny" Rand-K'ai	Iron Fist	1974 (May)	Roy Thomas, Gil Kane	Marvel Premiere #15
Luther Manning	Deathlok	1974 (August)	Rich Buckler, Doug Moench	Astonishing Tales #25
Hannibal King		1974 (October)	Marv Wolfman, Gene Colan	The Tomb of Dracula #25
Colleen Wing		1974 (November)	Doug Moench, Larry Hama	Marvel Premiere #19
James Howlett (Logan)	Currently: Wolverine; Formerly: Patch, Weapon X	1974 (October cameo, November full)	Len Wein, Herb Trimpe	The Incredible Hulk #180 (last panel cameo), The Incredible Hulk #181 (first full appearance)
Mercedes "Misty" Knight		1975 (January mentioned, March full), 1972 (March retcon)	Jenny Blake Isabella, Arvell Jones	Marvel Premiere #20 (mentioned by name), Marvel Premiere #21 (first full appearance), Marvel Team-Up #1 (retcon)
Pip Gofern	Pip the Troll	1975 (February)	Jim Starlin	Strange Tales #179
James Arthur "Jamie" Madrox	Multiple Man	1975 (February)	Len Wein, Chris Claremont, John Buscema	Giant-Size Fantastic Four #4
Team:All-New, All-Different X-Men; Members; (Cyclops, Banshee, Sunfire, Wolverine, Professor X, Marvel Girl, Angel, Iceman, Havok, Polaris; New Members: Piotr Nikolaievitch "Peter" Rasputin; Kurt Wagner, former Szardos; Ororo Munroe and John Proudstar	Peter: Colossus; Kurt: Nightcrawler; Ororo:Storm and John: Thunderbird	1975 (May)	Len Wein, Dave Cockrum	Giant-Size X-Men #1
Gamora Zen Whoberi Ben Titan	Requiem	1975 (June)	Jim Starlin	Strange Tales #180
Vance Astrovik	Currently: Justice; Formerly: Marvel Boy	1975 (July)	Don Heck, Jerry Conway	Giant-Size Defenders #5
Marc Spector, Steven Grant, Jake Lockley	Moon Knight	1975 (August)	Doug Moench, Don Perlin	Werewolf by Night #32
Manphibian		1975 (September)	Marv Wolfman, Jenny Blake Isabella, Dave Cockrum	Legion of Monsters #1
Team:The Champions; Members; (Angel, Black Widow, Ghost Rider, Hercules and Iceman)		1975 (October)	Jenny Blake Isabella, Don Heck	Champions #1
Ulysses Bloodstone		1975 (October)	Len Wein, Marv Wolfman, John Warner	Marvel Presents #1
Torpedo	Michael Stivak	1975 (October)	Marv Wolfman, John Romita Sr.	Daredevil #126
Stakar Ogord	Starhawk	1975 (October)	Steve Gerber, Sal Buscema	The Defenders #28
Aleta Ogord		1975 (November)	Steve Gerber, Sal Buscema, Vince Colletta	Defenders #29
Hector Ayala	White Tiger	1975 (December)	Bill Mantlo, George Perez	Deadly Hands of Kung Fu #19
Dr. Moira Ann Kinross MacTaggert	Moira X	1975 (December)	Chris Claremont, Dave Cockrum	X-Men #96
Peter Jason Quill	Star-Lord	1976 (January)	Steve Englehart, Steve Gan	Marvel Preview #4
Patricia "Patsy" Walker	Hellcat	First true appearance: 1944 (November); As a hero: 1976 (February)	Stuart Little, Ruth Atkinson (as Patsy Walker); Steve Englehart, George Pérez (as Hellcat)	First true appearance: Miss America Magazine #2; As a hero: The Avengers #144
Jonathan "Jack" Hart	Jack of Hearts	1976 (March)	Bill Mantlo, Keith Giffen	Deadly Hands of Kung Fu #22
Maximillian Quincy Coleridge	Shroud	1976 (April)	Steve Englehart, Herb Trimpe	Super-Villain Team-Up #5
Nicholette "Nikki" Gold		1976 (April)	Steve Gerber, Al Milgrom	Marvel Presents #4
Team:The Eternals; Members: Ikaris; Ajak; Sersi; Domo; Makkari; Thena; Zuras		1976 (July)	Jack Kirby	Eternals #1 and 2
Laynia Sergeievna Petrovna 'or' Krylova	Darkstar	1976 (August)	Jenny Blake Isabella, George Tuska	Champions #7
Richard "Rich" Rider	Nova	1976 (September)	Marv Wolfman, John Buscema	Nova #1
Brian Braddock	Currently: Captain Avalon; Formerly: Britanic, Captain Britain	1976 (October)	Chris Claremont, Herb Trimpe	Captain Britain Weekly #1
Drew Daniels	Texas Twister	1976 (December)	Roy Thomas, Mike Friedrich, George Pérez	Fantastic Four #177
Elizabeth "Betsy" Braddock	Currently: Captain Britain; Former: UK, US, Psylocke	1976 (December)	Chris Claremont, Herb Trimpe	Captain Britain #8
Jacqueline Falsworth Crichton	Spitfire	1976 (December)	Roy Thomas, Frank Robbins	Invaders #12
Griffin "Griff" Gogol	Captain Ultra	1976 (December)	Roy Thomas, Mike Friedrich, George Pérez	Fantastic Four #177
Team:Daughters of the Dragon; Members; Colleen Wing and Misty Knight		1976 (December)	Chris Claremont, John Byrne	Iron Fist #10
Lancelot "Lance" Hunter		1977 (February)	Gary Friedrich, Herb Trimpe	Captain Britain Weekly #19
Jessica Miriam "Jess" Drew	Spider-Woman	1977 (February)	Archie Goodwin, Marie Severin	Marvel Spotlight #32
Sprite		1977 (Mar)	Jack Kirby	The Eternals #9
Charles "Chuck" Chandler	3-D Man	1977 (April)	Roy Thomas, Johnny Craig	Marvel Premiere #35
Aaron Stack (legal name) Z2P45-9-X-51 (model number)	Machine Man	1977 (July)	Jack Kirby	2001: A Space Odyssey Vol 2 #8
Gilgamesh	Forgotten One	1977 (July)	Jack Kirby, Mike Royer	Eternals #13
Kallark	Gladiator	1977 (July)	Chris Claremont, Dave Cockrum	X-Men #107
Team:Starjammers Members; Christopher "Chris" Summers; Ch'od; Hepzibah; Raza Longknife and Cr'reee	Christopher: Corsair	1977 (April cameo, October full)	Dave Cockrum	The X-Men #104 (last page cameo), The X-Men #107 (first full appearance)
Jocasta Vi Quitéria 'or' Pym		1977 (August)	Jim Shooter, George Pérez	The Avengers vol. 1 #162
Robert Farrell	Rocket Racer	1977 (September)	Lein Wein, Ross Andru	The Amazing Spider-Man #172
Paladin		1978 (January)	Jim Shooter, Carmine Infantino	Daredevil #150
Wendell Vaughn	Currently: Quasar; Former:Marvel Boy, Marvel Man	1978 (January)	Donald F. Glut, Roy Thomas, John Buscema	Captain America #217
James: James MacDonald Hudson	Currently: Guardian; Formerly: Vindicator, Weapon Alpha	1978 (February)	Chris Claremont, John Byrne	X-Men #109
Devil Dinosaur and Moon-Boy		1978 (April)	Jack Kirby	Devil Dinosaur #1
Dmitri Bukharin and Nikolai "Krylov" Krylenko	Dmitri: Crimson Dynamo; Krylov: Red Guardian "and" Vanguard	1978 (April)	Bill Mantlo, Carmine Infantino	Iron Man #109
Team:The Heroes for Hire; Members;(Iron Fist and Luke Cage)		1978 (December)	Ed Hannigan, Lee Elias	Power Man and Iron Fist #54
James Rupert "Rhodey" Rhodes	Currently: War Machine; Formerly: Iron Man, Iron Patriot	1979 (January)	David Michelinie, John Byrne, Bob Layton	Iron Man #118
Bug		1979 (January)	Bill Mantlo, Michael Golden	Micronauts #1
Scott Edward Harris Lang	Ant-Man	1979 (March)	David Michelinie, John Byrne	The Avengers #181
Night Raven		1979 (March)	Steve Parkhouse, David Lloyd	Hulk Comic (UK) #1
Captain Universe		1979 (March)	Bill Mantlo, Michael Golden	'Micronauts #8
Team:Alpha Flight; Members: Jeanne-Marie Beaubier; Jean-Paul Beaubier; Walter Langkowski; Michael Twoyoungmen; Narya and Guardian	Jeanne-Marie: Aurora; Jean-Paul: Northstar; Walter: Sasquatch; Michael: Shaman and Narya: Snowbird	1979 (April)	John Byrne	The X-Men #120
Felicia Sara Hardy	Black Cat	1979 (July)	Marv Wolfman, Keith Pollard	The Amazing Spider-Man #194
Melissa Joan "Mel" Gold	Currently: Songbird; Former: Screaming Mimi	1979 (August)	Mark Gruenwald, Ralph Macchio, John Byrne	Marvel Two-In-One #54

=== 1980s ===
Real Name / Team / Series	Codename	Year Debuted	Creator/s	First Appearance
Katherine Anne "Kitty/Kate" Pryde and Emma Grace Frost	Katherine: (Currently: Red Queen/ Former: Shadowcat, Starlord, Ariel, Sprite) and Emma: White Queen	1980 (January)	Chris Claremont, John Byrne	Uncanny X-Men #129
Alison "Ali" Blaire	Dazzler	1980 (February)	Tom DeFalco, Louise Simonson, Roger Stern	Uncanny X-Men #130
Jennifer Susan Walters	Currently: She-Hulk; Formerly: Grey She-Hulk	1980 (February)	Stan Lee, John Buscema	Savage She-Hulk #1
Sage	Teresia Karisik	1980 (April)	Chris Claremont, John Byrne	X-Men #132
Tony Masters	Taskmaster	1980 (May)	David Michelinie, George Pérez	The Avengers #195
Ruth Bat-Seraph and Mikhail Uriokovitch Ursus	Ruth: Sabra and Mikhail: Ursa Major	1980 (August)	Bill Mantlo, Sal Buscema	The Incredible Hulk #250
Heather McNeil Hudson	Vindicator	1980 (November)	Chris Claremont, John Byrne	Uncanny X-Men #139
Xuân Cao Mạnh	Karma	1980 (December)	Chris Claremont, Frank Miller	Marvel Team-Up #100
Elektra Natchios		1981 (January)	Frank Miller	Daredevil #168
Joseph "Joey" Chapman	Union Jack	1981 (January)	John Byrne, Roger Stern	Captain America #253
Rachel "Ray" Anne Summers	Currently: Prestige; Former: Marvel Girl, Phoenix	1981 (January)	Chris Claremont, John Byrne	Uncanny X-Men #141
Theresa Maeve Rourke Cassidy	Currently: Siryn; Formerly: Morrigan, Banshee	1981 (April)	Chris Claremont, Steve Leialoha	Spider-Woman #37
Isaac Christians	Gargoyle	1981 (April)	J.M. DeMatteis, Don Perlin	Defenders #94
Jason "Jase" Strongbow	American Eagle	1981 (September)	Doug Moench, Ron Wilson	Marvel Two-In-One Annual #6
Team: The Rangers; Member;Phantom Rider, Red Wolf, Texas Twister; Bonita Juarez and Victoria Star	Bonita: Firebird; Victoria:Shooting Star	1981 (November)	Bill Mantlo, Sal Buscema	The Incredible Hulk #265
Anna Marie-LeBeau	Rogue	1981 (November)	Chris Claremont, Michael Golden	Avengers Annual #10
Collective Man	Han, Chang, Lin, Sun, and Ho Tao-Yu	1982 (march)	Mark Gruenwald	Marvel Super Hero Contest Of Champions #1
Tyrone "Ty" Johnson; Tandy Bowen	Tyrone: Cloak and Tandy: Dagger	1982 (March)	Bill Mantlo, Ed Hannigan	Peter Parker, the Spectacular Spider-Man #64
Rocket Raccoon		1982 (May)	Bill Mantlo, Keith Giffen	Marvel Preview #7
Frankie Raye	Nova	First true appearance: 1975 (November) as a Hero: 1982 (July)	Roy Thomas, George Perez	First true appearance: Fantastic Four #164 as a Hero: Fantastic Four #244
Eugene Paul Patilio	Frog-Man	1982 (September)	J.M. DeMatteis, Kerry Gammill	Marvel Team-Up #121
Monica Rambeau	Currently: Spectrum formerly: Captain Marvel, Photon, Pulsar	1982 (October)	Roger Stern, John Romita Jr.	Amazing Spider-Man Annual #16
Team: The New Mutants Samuel Zachary "Sam" Guthrie; Roberto "Bobby" Da Costa; Rahne Sinclair; Danielle "Dani" Moonstar	Sam: Cannonball; Bobby: (Currently: Sunspot/Formerly: Citizen V Rahne: Wolfsbane; Dani: Currently: Mirage/Formerly: Psyche	1982 (December)	Chris Claremont, Bob McLeod	The New Mutants Marvel Graphic Novel #4
Frankie D. Koolaid	Kool-Aid Man	1983 (January)	Micheal Craig Sr, Jim Salicrup	The Adventures of Kool-Aid Man #1
Lockheed		1983 (February)	Chris Claremont, Paul Smith	The Uncanny X-Men #166
Callisto		1983 (May)	Chris Claremont, Paul Smith	Uncanny X-Men #169
Marrina Smallwood		1983 (August)	John Byrne	Alpha Flight #1
Madison Jeffries		1983 (August)	John Byrne	Alpha Flight #1
Eugene Milton Judd	Puck	1983 (August)	John Byrne	Alpha Flight #1
Amara Juliana Olivians Aquilla (Allison Crestmere)	Magma	1983 (October)	Chris Claremont, Sal Buscema	New Mutants #8
Beta Ray Bill		1983 (November)	Walt Simonson	Thor #337
Elizabeth Twoyoungmen	Talisman	1983 (December)	John Byrne	Alpha Flight #5
Meggan Puceanu-Braddock	Gloriana	1983 (December)	Alan Moore, Alan Davis	Mighty World of Marvel #7
Illyana Nikolievna Alexandria Rasputin	Currently: Magik; Formerly: Darkchild	1983 (December)	Chris Claremont, Sal Buscema	Magik (Illyana and Storm Limited Series) #1
Douglas Ramsey	Cypher	1984 (March)	Chris Claremont, Sal Buscema	New Mutants #13
Leech		1984 (March)	Chris Claremont, John Romita Jr.	Uncanny X-Men #179
Venom		1984 (May, black costume)	David Michelinie, Mike Zeck	Amazing Spider-Man #252 (black costume), Marvel Super Heroes Secret Wars #8 (alien symbiote), Amazing Spider-Man #299 (last page cameo), Amazing Spider-Man #300 (first full appearance)
James "Jimmy" Jonathan Proudstar	Currently: Warpath; Formerly: Thunderbird	1984 (June)	Chris Claremont, Sal Buscema	New Mutants #16
Warlock		1984 (August)	Chris Claremont, Bill Sienkiewicz	New Mutants #18
Forge		1984 (August)	Chris Claremont, John Romita Jr.	Uncanny X-Men #184
Team:Power Pack; Members: Alexander "Alex" Power; Julie Power; Jack Power and Katherine "Katie" Margaret Power	Alex: (Currently: Zero G/Former: Destroyer, Gee, Powerpax, Mass Master); Julie: Lightspeed; Jack: {Currently: Mass Master/Former:Counterweight, Energizer, Destroyer} and Katie: {Currently: Energizer/Former:Starstreak}	1984 (August)	Louise Simonson, June Brigman	Power Pack #1
Thomas Fireheart	Puma	1984 (September)	Tom DeFalco, Ron Frenz,	The Amazing Spider-Man #256
Julia Eugenia Cornwall-Carpenter	Currently: Madame Web; Former: Spider-Woman, Arachne	(October, 1984)	Jim Shooter, Mike Zeck	Marvel Super Heroes Secret Wars #6
Paige Elisabeth Guthrie; Joshua Zachariah "Jay" Guthrie	Paige: Husk and Jay: Icarus	1984 (November)	Bill Mantlo, William Johnson	Rom Annual #3
Lila Cheney		1984 (November)	Chris Claremont, Bob McLeod	New Mutants Annual #1
Andromeda Attumasen		1985 (March)	Peter B. Gillis, Don Perlin, Kim DeMulder	The Defenders #143
David Charles Haller	Legion	1985 (March)	Chris Claremont, Bill Sienkiewicz	New Mutants #25
Angelica "Angel" Jones	Firestar	1985 (May) (Note: Firestar was originally created for the animated series Spider-Man and His Amazing Friends.)	Chris Claremont, John Romita Jr.	Uncanny X-Men #193
Silvia Sablinova	Silver Sable	1985 (June)	Tom DeFalco, Ron Frenz, Josef Rubinstein	The Amazing Spider-Man #265
Guido Carosella	Strong Guy	1985 (July)	Chris Claremont, Bill Sienkiewicz	New Mutants #29
Longshot		1985 (September)	Ann Nocenti, Arthur Adams, Carl Potts	Longshot #1
Rita Wayword	Currently: Spiral; Formerly: Ricochet Rita, Agent, Apocalypse	1985 (September)	Ann Nocenti, Art Adams	Longshot #1
Sharon Ventura	Currently: Ms. Marvel; Former: She-Thing	1985 (September)	Mike Carlin, Ron Wilson	Thing #27
Max Eisenhardt	Magneto	First True Appearance: July, 1963, As Hero: 1985 (September)	Stan Lee, Jack Kirby	Uncanny X-Men #200
Dennis Dunphy	Demolition Man "and" D-Man	1985 (October)	Mike Carlin, Ron Wilson	The Thing #28
Rachel "Ray" Leighton	Diamondback	1985 (October)	Mark Gruenwald, Paul Neary	Captain America #310
Tabitha "Tabby/Tab" Smith	Boom-Boom	1985 (November)	Jim Shooter, Al Milgrom	Secret Wars II #5
Rita DeMara	Yellowjacket	1986 (February)	Roger Stern, John Buscema	The Avengers #264
Team:X-Factor; Members;(Cyclops, Angel, Beast, Iceman, Marvel Girl, Russell "Rusty" Collins)		1986 (February)	Bob Layton, Jackson Guice	X-Factor #1
Arthur "Artie" Maddicks		1986 (March)	Bob Layton, Jackson Guice	X-Factor #2
Joanna Cargill	Frenzy	1986 (May)	Bob Layton, Keith Pollard	X-Factor #4
Sally Blevins	Former: Skids	1986 (August)	Louise Simonson, Jackson Guice	X-Factor #8
Edward Charles "Eddie" Allan Brock	Currently: Venom; Formerly: Anti-Venom, Toxin	1986 (September)	David Michelinie, Todd McFarlane	Web of Spider-Man #18
James Bourne	Currently: Solo; Formerly: Bullseye, Deadpool	1986 (October)	David Michelinie, Marc Silvestri, Erik Larsen	Web of Spider-Man #19
John F. Walker	Currently: U.S. Agent; Formerly: Super Patriot, Captain America	1986 (November)	Mark Gruenwald, Paul Neary	Captain America #323
Lemar Hoskins	Battlestar	1986 (November, Unnamed)/ 1987 (September, Named)	Mark Gruenwald, Paul Neary	Captain America #323 (Unnamed)/ #333 (Named)
Death's Head		1987 (May)	Simon Furman, Geoff Senior	Transformers (UK) #113
Julio Esteban "Ric" Richter	Rictor	1987 (June)	Louise Simonson, Walter Simonson	X-Factor #17
Robert "Robbie" Baldwin	Currently: Speedball; Former: Penance	1988 (January)	Tom DeFalco, Steve Ditko	The Amazing Spider-Man Annual #22
Team:Excalibur; Members;(Captain Britain, Meggan, Phoenix (Rachel Summers), Shadowcat, Nightcrawler)		1988 (April)	Chris Claremont, Alan Davis	Excalibur Special Edition #1
Eric Kevin Masterson	Currently: Thunderstrike; Formerly: Thor	1988 (May)	Tom DeFalco, Ron Frenz	Thor #391
Alphonso "Al" MacKenzie		1988 (August)	Bob Harras, Paul Neary	Nick Fury vs. S.H.I.E.L.D. #3
Takeshi "Taki" Matsuya	Wiz Kid	1988 (October)	Louise Simonson, Jon Bogdanove	X-Terminators #1
Jubilation "Jubes" Lee	Currently: Jubilee; Formerly: Wondra	1988 (May)	Chris Claremont, Marc Silvestri	Uncanny X-Men #244
Team: Great Lakes Avengers; Members: Craig Hollis; Dinah Soar; Val Ventura (Matt); DeMarr Davis and Bertha (former Ashley) Crawford	Craig: Mister Immortal; Val: Flatman; DeMarr: Doorman and Bertha: Big Bertha	1989 (July)	John Byrne	West Coast Avengers (Vol. 2) #46
Kwannon	Currently: Psylocke; Former: Revanche	1989 (December)	Fabian Nicieza, Andy Kubert	Uncanny X-Men #256
Dwayne Taylor	Night Thrasher	1989 (December)	Tom DeFalco, Ron Frenz	Thor #411
Team: The New Warriors		1989 (December)	Tom DeFalco, Ron Frenz	Thor #411

=== 1990s ===
Real Name / Team / Series	Codename	Year Debuted	Creator/s	First Appearance
Nathan Christopher Charles Summers	Cable	1990 (March)	Louise Simonson, Rob Liefeld	New Mutants #87
Daniel "Danny" Ketch	Currently: Death Rider/ Spirit of Corruption; Former: Ghost Rider	1990 (May)	Howard Mackie, Javier Saltares	Ghost Rider vol. 3 # 1
Remy Etienne LeBeau	Gambit	1990 (August)	Chris Claremont, Jim Lee	Uncanny X-Men Annual #14
Silhouette Chord	Silhouette	1990 (August)	Fabian Nicieza, Mark Bagley	New Warriors #2
Miguel Santos	Living Lightning	1990 (October)	Roy Thomas, Dann Thomas, Paul Ryan	Avengers West Coast #63
Elvin Daryl Haliday	Rage	1990 (November)	Larry Hama, Paul Ryan	Avengers #326
William Baker	Sandman	First True Appearance: 1963 (June), As a Hero/Avenger: 1990 (November)	Stan Lee, Steve Ditko	Avengers #329
Wade Winston Wilson	Currently: Deadpool; Formerly: Zenpool, Dead Fist, Spiderman, Wolverine	1991 (February)	Rob Liefeld, Fabian Nicieza	The New Mutants #98
Neena Thurman	Domino	1991 (February)	Fabian Nicieza, Rob Liefeld	New Mutants Vol .1 #98
Christopher "Chris" Powell	Darkhawk	1991 (March)	Danny Fingeroth, Mike Manley	Darkhawk #1
Gaveedra Seven and Maria Callasantos	Gaveedra: Shatterstar and Maria: Feral	1991 (March)	Rob Liefeld, Fabian Niciezas	New Mutants #99
Team: X-Force; Members: (Cable, Cannonball, Warpath (James Proudstar), Domino, Shatterstar, Feral)		1991 (April)	Rob Liefeld, Fabian Nicieza	The New Mutants #100
Sleepwalker		1991 (June)	Bob Budiansky, Bret Blevins	Sleepwalker #1
Raven Darkhölme	Mystique	First True Appearance: 1978 (January) As Hero: 1991 (September)	Archie Goodwin, Frank Thorne, Chris Claremont, Jim Mooney	Ms. Marvel #16, As Hero: X-Factor #70
Lyja		1991 (October)	Tom DeFalco, Paul Ryan	Fantastic Four #357
Lucas Bishop	Red Bishop	1991 (November)	Whilce Portacio, Jim Lee	Uncanny X-Men #282
Doreen Allene Green	Squirrel Girl	1991 (November)	Will Murray, Steve Ditko	Marvel Super-Heroes vol 2 #8
Vengeance (Michael Badilino)	Vengeance	1992 (January)	Howard Mackie, Ron Wagner	Ghost Rider Vol 3 #21
Christoph Nord "or" Christopher Nord	Maverick, Agent Zero	1992 (February)	John Byrne, Jim Lee	X-Men Vol. 2 #5
Team: Infinity Watch; Members; (Adam Warlock, Moondragon, Drax the Destroyer, Pip the Troll, Gamora)		1992 (March)	Jim Starlin, Angel Medina	Warlock and the Infinity Watch #2
Shevaun Haldane	Currently: Dark Angel; Formerly: Hell's Angel	1992 (July)	Bernie Jaye, Geoff Senior	Hell's Angel #1
Team: Midnight Sons		1992 (August)	Jim Starlin, Angel Medina	Ghost Rider Vol 3 #28
Michiko "Mickey" Musashi	Turbo	1992 (October)	Fabian Nicieza, Darick Robertson	New Warriors #28
Steven Winsor McCay Harmon	Slapstick	1992 (November)	Len Kaminski, James Fry	Slapstick #1
Miguel O’Hara	Spider-Man 2099	1992 (November)	Peter David, Rick Leonard	Spider-Man 2099 #1
Eric Kevin Masterson	Thunderstrike	1993 (February)	Tom Delcao, Ron Frenz	Thor #459
Jillian Marie Woods	Currently: Sepulchre; Former: Shadowoman	1993 (April)	Mark Gruenwald, Grant Miehm	Quasar #45
James Bradley	Doctor Nemesis	1993 (May)	Roy Thomas, Dave Hoover	Invaders vol. 2 #1
Sharra Neramani	Lifecry/Deathcry	1993 (June)	Bob Harras, Steve Epting	Avengers #363
Donyell Taylor	Currently: Night Thrasher; Formerly: Bandit	1993 (October)	Fabian Nicieza, Ken Lashley, Fred Haynes	Night Thrasher #3
Genis-Vell	Currently: Photon; Formerly: Legacy, Captain Marvel	1993 (October)	Ron Marz, Ron Lim	Silver Surfer Annual #6
Team: Force Works		1994 (July)	Dan Abnett, Andy Lanning, Tom Tenney	Force Works #1
Cathy Webster	Free Spirit	1994 (September)	Mark Gruenwald, Dave Hoover	Captain America #431
Sarah	Marrow	1994 (September)	Jeph Loeb, Dave Brewer	Cable #15
Clarice Ferguson	Blink	1994 (October)	Scott Lobdell, Joe Madureira	Uncanny X-Men #317
Angelo Espinosa	Skin	1994 (October)	Scott Lobdell, Joe Madureira	Uncanny X-Men #317
Team: Generation X Members: Emma Frost; Banshee, Jubilee, Husk; Monet Yvette Clarisse Maria Therese St. Croix; Everett Thomas; Angelo Espinosa and Jonothon "Jono" Evan Starsmore	Monet; (Currently: Penance; Former: M); Everett: Synch; Angelo: Skin and Jonothon: (Currently: Chamber/ Former: Decibel)	1994 (November)	Scott Lobdell, Chris Bachalo	Uncanny X-Men #318
Ben Reilly	Currently: Scarlet Spider; Formerly: Jackal	1994 (November)	Terry Kavanagh, Steven Butler	Web of Spider-Man #118
Suzi Endo	Currently: Cybermancer; Former: The Seeker	1994 (December)	Dan Abnett, Andy Lanning, Dave Taylor	Force Works #6
Jack Harrison	Jack Flag	1994 (December)	Mark Gruenwald, Dave Hoover	Captain America #434
Kaine Parker	Currently:Scarlet Spider; Former: Tarantula	1994 (December)	Terry Kavanagh, Steve Butler	Web of Spider-Man #119
Peter Paul "Pete" Wisdom		1995 (February)	Warren Ellis, Ken Lashley	Excalibur #1
Nathaniel "Nate" Grey	X-Man	1995 (March)	Jeph Loeb, Steve Skroce	X-Man #1
Delilah Dearborn	Geiger	1996 (January)	Dan Slott, Ken Lashley	Doc Samson #1
Scott Washington	Hybrid	1996 (February)	Larry Hama, Joe St. Pierre	Venom: Along Came a Spider #2
Rebecca "Rikki" Barnes	Former: Rikki Barnes, Nomad	1996 (September)	Jeph Loeb, Rob Liefeld	Heroes Reborn #½
Team: MI13		1996 (September)	Warren Ellis, Casey Jones	Excalibur #101
Susanna Lauren Sherman (human name); Tsu-Zana (Kree name)	Ultragirl	1996 (November)	Barbara Kesel, Leonard Kirk	Ultragirl #1
Team: The Thunderbolts; Members; Citizen V, Atlas, Mach-1, Meteorite, Techno and Melissa Joan Gold		1997 (January)	Kurt Busiek, Mark Bagley	The Incredible Hulk #449
Carlos LaMuerto	Black Tarantula	1997 (January)	Tom DeFalco, Steve Skroce	Amazing Spider-Man #419
Helen "Hallie" Takahama	Jolt	1997 (April)	Kurt Busiek, Mark Bagley	Thunderbolts #1
Japheth	Maggott	1997 (June)	Scott Lobdell, Joe Madureira	Uncanny X-Men #345
Cecilia Reyes		1997 (June)	Scott Lobdell, Carlos Pacheco	X-Men vol. 2 #65
May "Mayday" Parker	Currently: Spider-Woman; Formerly: Spider-Girl	1998 (February)	Tom DeFalco, Ron Frenz, Mark Bagley	What If? Vol 2 #105
Team: A-Next and Zane Yama	Zane: J2	1998 (February)	Tom DeFalco, Ron Frenz	What If? Vol 2 #105
Shannon Carter	American Dream	1998 (August), as a Hero (November)	Tom DeFalco, Ron Frenz	A-Next #1, as a Hero #4
Mainframe		1998 (August)	Tom DeFalco, Ron Frenz	A-Next #1
Team: Big Hero 6		1998 (September)	Steven T. Seagle, Duncan Rouleau	Sunfire and Big Hero 6 #1
Maria de Guadalupe Santiago	Silverclaw	1998 (September)	Kurt Busiek, George Pérez	Avengers v3 #8
Team: Slingers; Members:Johnathon "Johnny" Gallo; Richard "Ritchie" Gilmore; Cassie St. Commons and Edward "Eddie" McDonough	Johnny: Ricochet; Richard: Prodigy; Eddie: Hornet; Cassie: Dusk	1998 (September)	Joseph Harris, Adam Pollina	Slingers #0
Delroy Garrett Jr.	Currently: 3-D Man; Former: Triathlon	1998 (September)	Kurt Busiek, George Pérez	Avengers vol. 3 #8
Team: Winter Guard		1998 (October)	Kurt Busiek, Sean Chen	Iron Man Vol .3 #9
Okoye		1998 (November)	Christopher Priest, Max Texeira	Black Panther Vol. 3 #1
Maya Lopez	Currently: Echo, Phoenix; Formerly: Ronin	1999 (May)	David Mack, Joe Quesada	Daredevil Vol. 2 #9

=== 2000s ===
Real Name / Team / Series	Codename	Year Debuted	Creator/s	First Appearance
Tara Olson (Tarene)	Currently: Designate; Former: Thor Girl	[2000 (April)	Dan Jurgens, John Romita Jr.	Thor Vol 2 #22
Talia Josephine "T.J" Wagner	Nocturne	2000 (June)	Jim Calafiore	X-Men: Millennial Visions #2000
Noh-Varr	Currently: Marvel Boy; Former: Captain Marvel, Protector	2000 (August)	Grant Morrison, J. G. Jones	Marvel Boy #1
Robert "Bob" Reynolds	Sentry	2000 (September)	Paul Jenkins, Jae Lee, Rick Veitch	The Sentry #1
Team: X-Statix; Members: Doop; Tike Alicar and Edith Constance "Edie" Sawyer	Tike: Anarchist; Edie: U-Go Girl	2001 (July)	Peter Milligan, Mike Allred	X-Force #116
Guy Smith; Myles Alfred; William Robert "Billy-Bob" Reilly	Guy: {Currently: Mister Sensitive/Former: Orphan} Myles: Vivisector; Billy-Bob: Phat	2001 (August)	Peter Milligan, Michael Allred	X-Force #117
Ellie Phimister	Negasonic Teenage Warhead	2001 (August)	Grant Morrison, Frank Quitely	New X-Men #115
Team: The Exiles		2001 (August)	Judd Winick, Mike McKone	Exiles #1
Kevin Sidney	Morph	2001 (August)	Judd Winick, Mike McKone	Exiles #1
Robert Herman and Barnell Bohusk	Robert: (Currently: Glob/Former: Inhuman Torch) and Barnell: (Currently: Beak/Former: Blackwing)	2001 (October)	Grant Morrison, Ethan Van Sciver	New X-Men #117
Angel Salvadore and Stepford Cuckoos	Former: Angel, Tempest	2001 (November)	Grant Morrison, Ethan Van Sciver	New X-Men #118
Martha Johansson	No-Girl	2001 (November)	Grant Morrison, Ethan Van Sciver	New X-Men #118
Jessica Jones	Former: Jewel, Knightress, Power Woman	2001 (November)	Brian Michael Bendis, Michael Gaydos	Alias #1
Miranda "Mira" Leevald	Stacy X	2001 (December)	Joe Casey, Tom Raney	Uncanny X-Men #399
Elsa Bloodstone		2001 (December)	Dan Abnett, Andy Lanning, Michael Lopez	Bloodstone #1
Moonbeam	Dead Girl	2002 (April)	Peter Milligan, Mike Allred	X-Force #125
Inez Temple	Outlaw	2002 (May)	Gail Simone, Udon Studios	Deadpool #65
Charlie Cluster-7	Fantomex	2002 (August)	Grant Morrison, Igor Kordey	New X-Men #128
Venus Dee Milo		2002 (September)	Peter Milligan, Mike Allred	X-Statix #1
Nicholas Gleason	Wolf Cub	2002 (October)	Brian K. Vaughan, Lee Ferguson	Chamber #1
Kevin "Kasper" Cole	Currently: White Tiger; Former: Black Panther	2002 (December)	Christopher Priest, Dan Fraga	Black Panther vol 3 #50
Sooraya Qadir	Dust	2002 (December)	Robert O. Erisman, Sam Cooper	New X-Men #133
Quintavius Quirinius "Quentin" Quire	Kid Omega	2003 (January)	Grant Morrison, Keron Grant	New X-Men #134
Ernst		2003 (February)	Grant Morrison, Frank Quitely	New X-Men #135
Cain Marko	Juggernaut	First Real Appearance: 1965 (May) As a Hero: 2003 (June)	Stan Lee, Jack Kirby, Alex Toth	First Real Appearance: "X-Men" #12 As a Hero:Uncanny X-Men#425
Team: The Runaways; Members: Alex Wilder; Chase Stein; Gertrude "Gert" Yorkes; Karolina Dean; Molly Hayes; Nico Minoru and Old Lace	All Formerly: Alex: A-Wild, Youngblood; Chase: Talkback, Gun Arm; Gert: Arsenic; Karolina: Lucy in the Sky, Princess Justice; Nico: Sister Grimm, The Gloom and Molly: Princess Powerful, Bruiser, Blue-J	2003 (July)	Brian K. Vaughan, Adrian Alphona	Runaways vol. 1 #1 and #2
Sofia Mantega	Currently: Wind Dancer; Former: Renascence	2003 (July)	Nunzio DeFilippis, Christina Weir, Keron Grant	New Mutants Vol 2 #1
Julian Keller; Cessily Kincaid and Laurie Collins	Julian: Hellion; Cessily: Mercury and Laurie: Wallflower	2003 (August)	Nunzio DeFilippis, Christina Weir, Keron Grant	New Mutants Vol 2 #2
Victor "Vic" Borkowski	Anole	2003 (August)	Nunzio DeFilippis, Christina Weir, Carlo Barberi	New Mutants Vol. 2 #2
Santo Vaccarro	Rockslide	2003 (September)	Nunzio DeFilippis, Christina Weir, Carlo Barberi	New Mutants Vol 2 #3
David Alleyne	Prodigy	2003 (October)	Nunzio DeFilippis, Christina Weir, Keron Grant	New Mutants Vol 2 #4
Angela del Toro	White Tiger	2003 (November)	Brian Michael Bendis, Alex Maleev	Daredevil vol. 2 #58
Joshua "Josh" Foley	Elixir	2003 (November)	Nunzio DeFilippis, Christina Weir, Mark Robinson	New Mutants Vol 2 #5
Phyla-Vell	Currently: Martyr; Former: Captain Marvel, Quasar	2004 (January)	Peter David, Paul Azaceta	Captain Marvel Vol. 5 #16
Benjamin "Ben" Hammil	Match	2004 (January)	Nunzio DeFilippis, Christina Weir, Carlo Babreri	New Mutants Vol. 2 #7
Noriko "Nori" Ashida (芦田 則子 Ashida Noriko)	Surge	2004 (January)	Nunzio DeFilippis, Christina Weir, Carlo Barberi, Khary Randolph	New Mutants Vol 2 #8
Laura Kinney	Currently: X-23/Wolverine	2004 (February) (Note: Laura Kinney first appeared in the animated series X-Men: Evolution in episode number 41 (titled "X-23").)	Craig Kyle, Christopher Yost	NYX #3
Kelsey Shorr Kirkland	Currently: Lionheart; Former: Captain Britain	2004 (March)	Chuck Austen, Olivier Coipel	Avengers Vol. 3 #77
Alani Ryan	Loa	2004 (June)	Michael Ryan	New Mutants Vol 2 #311
Peter Quill	Star-Lord	2004 (June)	Keith Giffen, Ron Lim	Thanos #8
Daisy Louise Johnson	Currently: Quake; Formerly: Skye	2004 (July)	Brian Michael Bendis, Gabriele Dell'Otto	Secret Wars #2
Patrick "Pat" Mulligan	Toxin	2004 (August)	Peter Milligan, Clayton Crain	Venom Vs. Carnage #2
Anya Corazon	Currently: Spider-Girl; Former: Araña	2004 (August)	Fiona Avery, Mark Brooks	Amazing Fantasy Vol 2 #1
Hisako Ichiki (市来 久子, Ichiki Hisako)	Armor	2004 (October)	Joss Whedon, John Cassaday	Astonishing X-Men Vol. 3 #4
Megan Gwynn	Pixie	2004 (November)	Nunzio DeFilippis, Christina Weir, Michael Ryan	New X-Men Vol. 2 #5
Organization: S.W.O.R.D. and Abigail Brand		2004 (September)	Joss Whedon, John Cassaday	Astonishing X-Men Vol. 3 #3
Paras Gavaskar and Hope Abbott	Paras: Indra and Hope: Trance	2005 (January)	Nunzio DeFilippis, Christina Weir, Michael Ryan	New X-Men Vol. 2 #7
Ruth Aldine	Currently: Blindfold; Formerly: Destiny	2005 (January)	Joss Whedon, John Cassaday	Astonishing X-Men Vol 3 #7
Maria Hill		2005 (March)	Brian Michael Bendis, David Finch	New Avengers #4
Team: The Young Avengers; Members:Nathaniel "Nate" Richards; Theodore "Teddy" Altman; Elijah "Eli" Bradley; William "Billy" Kaplan; Katherine "Kate" Bishop and Cassandra Eleanor "Cassie" Lang	Nate: Iron Lad; Teddy: Hulkling; Eli: (Former: Patriot); Billy: (Currently: Wiccan/Former: Asgardian)} Kate Bishop: Hawkeye and Cassie: (Currently: Stinger/Former: Stature)	2005 (April); Cassie First True Appearance: 1979 (April)	Allan Heinberg, Jim Cheung	Young Avengers #1; Cassie First True Appearance: Marvel Premiere #47
Victor Mancha	Former: Kid Justice	2005 (April)	Brian K. Vaughan, Adrian Alphona	Runaways Vol. 2 #1
Shuri	Currently: Aja-Adanna; Former: Black Panther	2005 (May)	Reginald Hudlin, John Romita Jr.	Black Panther Vol 4 #2
Greg Willis	Gravity	2005 (August)	Sean McKeever, Mike Norton	Gravity #1
Zachary Smith Jr.	Microbe	2005 (August)	Zeb Wells, Skottie Young	New Warriors Vol 3 #1
Roxanne "Roxy" Washington	Bling!	2005 (August)	Peter Milligan, Salvador Larroca	X-Men Vol. 2 #171
Xavin		2005 (October)	Brian K. Vaughan, Adrian Alphona	Runaways Vol. 2 #7
Vince "Vic" Marcus	Warwolf	2005 (October)	Richard Buckler	Nick Fury's Howling Commandos #1
Camille Benally	Cammi	2005 (November)	Keith Giffen, Mitch Breitweiser	Drax the Destroyer #1
Deborah Fields	Debrii	2005 (November)	Zeb Wells, Skottie Young	New Warriors Vol. 3 #4
Amadeus Cho	Currently: Brawn; Former: Hulk	2005 (November)	Greg Pak, Takeshi Miyazawa	Amazing Fantasy vol. 2 #15
Armando Muñoz	Darwin	2005 (December)	Ed Brubaker, Pete Woods	X-Men: Deadly Genesis #2
Team :Nextwave and The Captain		2006 (January)	Warren Ellis, Stuart Immonen	Nextwave #1
Joseph "Joe" Green	Gauntlet	2006 (February) (Mentioned); 2007 (June) (Full)	Dan Slott, Stefano Caselli	She-Hulk Vol 2 #3 (Mentioned); Avengers: The Initiative #1 (Full)
Thomas "Tommy" Shepherd	Speed	2006 (March)	Allan Heinberg, Jim Cheung	Young Avengers #10
Nezhno "Nez" Abidemi	Gentle	2006 (April)	Craig Kyle, Christopher Yost, Mark Brooks, Paul Pelletier	"New X-Men" Vol. 2 #23
Michael Pointer	Currently: Omega; Formerly: Guardian, Collective	2006 (April)	Brian Michael Bendis, Steve McNiven	New Avengers #16
Korg		First true appearance: 1962 (August); As a Hero: 2006 (May)	Stan Lee, Larry Lieber, Jack Kirby	First true appearance: Journey into Mystery #83; As a Hero: Incredible Hulk vol 2 #93
Team: Agents of Atlas; Members: (James Woo, Venus, Robert Grayson, M-11, Gorilla-Man)		2006 (August)	Jeff Parker, Leonard Kirk	Agents of Atlas #1
Maria Vasquez	Tarantula	2006 (October)	Justin Gray, Jimmy Palmiotti	Heroes for Hire Vol 2 #1
Orson Randall	Iron Fist	2006 (December)	Ed Brubaker, David Aja	Immortal Iron Fist #1
Eric O'Grady	Original: Ant-Man; New: Black Ant	2006 (December)	Robert Kirkman, Phil Hester	The Irredeemable Ant-Man #1
Team: The Order; Members:Henry Hellrung; James Wa; Milo Fields; Rebecca 'Becky' Ryan; Mulholland "Holly" Black and Magdalena Marie 'Maggie' Neuntauben	Henry: Anthem; James: Calamity; Milo: (Currently: Hybrid/Former: Supernaut); Becky: Aralune and Maggie: Veda	2007 (January Cameo, September Full)	Matt Fraction, Steve McNiven (Mark Millar, Barry Kitson)	Civil War #6 (Cameo); The Order Vol 2 #1 (Full)
Robert "Bob" Dobalina	Bob, Agent of Hydra	2007 (March)	Fabian Nicieza	Cable & Deadpool #38]
Melati Kusuma	Komodo	2007 (June)	Dan Slott, Stefano Caselli	Avengers: The Initiative #1
Abigail "Abby" Boylen; Terrance Ward and Roger Brokeridge	Abby: Cloud 9 Terrance: Trauma and Roger: Hardball	2007 (May Cameo, June Full)	Dan Slott, Stefano Caselli	Civil War Battle Damage Report #1 (Cameo); Avengers: The Initiative #1 (Full)
Ares		First True Appearance: 1941 (October)/1966 (April), As a Hero: 2007 (May)	Carl Burgos, Henry P. Chapman, Jack D'Arcy, Bill Everett, George Kapitan, Mike Roy, Harry Sahle, Stan Lee, Jack Kirby	First True Appearance:Human Torch #5 (Fall)/Thor #129 As a Hero: The Mighty Avengers #1
Sara Ehret and Alana Jobson	Jackpot	Sara: 2007 (May); Alana: 2008(January)	Dan Slott, Phil Jimenez	Sara: Free Comic Book Day (Vol. 2007) #Spider-Man; Alana: Amazing Spider-Man #546
Klara Prast	Rose Red, Tower of Flower	2007 (August)	Joss Whedon, Michael Ryan	Runaways Vol. 2 #27
Groot		2007 (July)	Keith Giffen, Timothy Green II	Annihilation: Conquest – Starlord #1
Fat Cobra		2007 (October)	Ed Brubaker, Matt Fraction, David Aja	Immortal Iron Fist #8
Skaar		2007 (November)	Greg Pak, John Romita Jr.	World War Hulk #5
Hope Summers		2008 (January)	Mike Carey, Chris Bachalo	X-Men Vol 2 #205
Cosmo the Spacedog		2008 (January)	Andy Lanning, Dan Abnett, Wellinton Alves	Nova Vol 4 #8
Richard Millhouse "Rick" Jones	Former: A-Bomb, Whisperer	First true appearance: 1962 (May); As a Hero: 2008 (February)	Stan Lee, Jack Kirby	First true appearance: The Incredible Hulk #1; As a Hero: Hulk Vol 2 #2
Thaddeus E. "Thunderbolt" Ross	Former: Red Hulk	First true appearance: 1962 (May); As a Hero: 2008 (March)	Stan Lee, Jack Kirby	First true appearance: Incredible Hulk #1; As a Hero: Hulk Vol 2 #1
Faiza Hussain	Excalibur	2008 (May)	Paul Cornell, Leonard Kirk	Captain Britain and MI13 #1
Team: Young X-Men; Members: Jonas Graymalkin; Eric Gitter; Blindfold; Wolf Cub; Dust and Rockslide	Jonas: Graymalkin; Eric: Ink	2008 (June)	Marc Guggenheim, Yanick Paquette	Young X-Men #1
Lyra	She-Hulk	2008 (June)	Jeff Parker, Karl Hirst Breitweiser	Hulk: Raging Thunder #1
Team: The Guardians of the Galaxy (Star-Lord, Rocket Raccoon, Quasar, Adam Warlock, Gamora, Drax the Destroyer, and Groot)		2008 (July)	Dan Abnett, Andy Lanning	Guardians of the Galaxy Vol 2 #1
Team: GeNext Members: Becka Munroe, Rico Richards, Olivier Raven, Rebecca Lebeau, Pavel Rasputin, Megan Summers No-Name, Beast, X-23, Cyclops, Emma Frost, Cecilia Reyes		2008 (July)	Chris Claremont, Patrick Scherberger	GeNext #1
Emery Schaub	Butterball	2008 (July)	Christos Gage, Steve Uy	Avengers: The Initiative #13
Team: Secret Warriors; Members: Nick Fury; Quake; Alexander Aaron; Sebastian Druid; Elena "Yo Yo" Rodriguez; James Taylor "J.T." Slade and Jerry Sledge	Alexander: Phobos; Sebastian: Druid; Yo-Yo: Slingshot; J.T.: Hellfire and Jerry: Stonewall	2008 (July)	Brian Michael Bendis, Alex Maleev	Mighty Avengers #13
Old Man Logan	Formerly: Wolverine, Patch	2008 (August)	Mark Millar, Steve McNiven	Fantastic Four #558
Adam Bernard Brashear	Blue Marvel	2008 (November)	Kevin Grevioux	Adam: Legend of the Blue Marvel #1
Alisa Tager	Cipher	2008 (November)	Marc Guggenheim, Rafa Sandoval	Young X-Men #8
Peter Parker	Currently: The Spider-Man; Former: Spider-Man Noir	2008 (December)	David Hine, Fabrice Sapolsky	Spider-Man: Noir #1
Ghost		First True Appearance: 1987 (March) As Hero: 2009 (January)	David Michelinie, Bob Layton	Iron Man #219 As a Hero: Thunderbolts #128
Victoria Hand		2009 (February)	Brian Michael Bendis, Mike Deodato	The Invincible Iron Man Vol 2 #8
Humberto Lopez	Reptil	2009 (May)	Christos N. Gage, Steve Uy	Avengers: The Initiative Featuring Reptil #1
Eden Fesi	Manifold	2009 (May)	Brian Michael Bendis, Jonathan Hickman, Stefano Caselli	Secret Warriors #4
Bentley Wittman	Bentley-23	2009 (August)	Jonathan Hickman, Dale Eaglesham	Fantastic Four #570
Lana Baumgartner	Bombshell	2009 (September)	Brian Bendis, David LaFuente	Ultimate Comics Spider-Man #2
Víctor Hernán Álvarez	Power Man	2009 (September)	Fred Van Lente, Mahmud Asrar	Dark Reign: The List – Daredevil #1

=== 2010s ===
Real Name / Team / Series	Codename	Year Debuted	Creator/s	First Appearance
James "Jimmy" Hudson Jr.	Currently: Poison; Former: Wolverine	2010 (February)	Jeph Loeb, Arthur Adams	Ultimate X #1
Hit-Monkey		2010 (February)	Daniel Way, Dalibor Talajić	Hit-Monkey #1
School:Avengers Academy; Student: Jeanne Foucault; Jennifer Takeda; Ken Mack; Brandon Sharpe; Madeline "Maddy" Berry and Reptil	Jeanne: Finesse; Madeline: Veil; Jennifer: Hazmat; Ken: Mettle and Brandon: Striker	2010 (June)	Christos Gage, Mike McKone	Avengers Academy #1
Team:Future Foundation; Members(Alex Power, Valeria Richards, Franklin Richards, Artie Maddicks, Dragon Man, Bentley-23, Tong, Turg, Korr, Mik, Vil, Wu)		2010 (May)	Jonathan Hickman, Steve Epting	Fantastic Four #579
Gunna Sijurvald	Troll	2010 (June)	Jeff Parker, Kev Walker	Thunderbolts #145
Laurie Tromette	Transonic	2010 (July)	Matt Fraction, Kieron Gillen, Whilce Portacio	Uncanny X-Men #526
Gabriel Cohuelo	Velocidad	2010 (August)	Matt Fraction, Kieron Gillen, Whilce Portacio	Uncanny X-Men #527
Idie Okonkwo	Oya	2010 (September)	Matt Fraction, Kieron Gillen, Whilce Portacio	Uncanny X-Men #528
Teon Macik	Primal	2010 (October)	Matt Fraction, Kieron Gillen, Whilce Portacio	Uncanny X-Men #529
Kevin Masterson	Thunderstrike	First true appearance: 1988 (June) as a Hero: 2010 (November)	Tom DeFalco, Ron Frenz	First true appearance: Thor #392 as a Hero: Thunderstrike Vol 2 #1
Ikon		2011 (January)	Dan Abnett, Andy Lanning, Miguel Sepulveda	Thanos Imperative: Devastation #1
Eugene "Flash" Thompson	Currently: Agent Anti-Venom; Former: Agent Venom	First true appearance: 1962 (June) as a Hero: 2011 (February)	Dan Slott, Paulo Siqueira	First true appearance: Amazing Fantasy #15; As a Hero: Amazing Spider-Man #654
Evan Sabahnur	Currently: Genesis; Former: Apocalypse	2011) (April)	Rick Remender, Esad Ribić	Uncanny X-Force #7
Loki Laufeyson	Ikol	As Loki: 1949 (May), 1962 (August), As Ikol: 2011 (April)	Kieron Gillen, Stephanie Hans	Venus #6 (May 1949) (Golden Age), Journey Into Mystery #85 (August 1962) (Silver Age), Journey Into Mystery (Vol. 4) #622
America Chavez	Miss America	2011 (July)	Joe Casey, Nick Dragotta	Vengeance #1
Alejandra Jones	Ghost Rider	2011 (July)	Rob Williams, Matthew Clark	Ghost Rider Vol 7 #1
Broo		2011 (July)	Christos N. Gage, Juan Bobillo	Astonishing X-Men Vol. 3 #40
Miles Gonzalo Morales	Spider-Man	2011 (August)	Brian Michael Bendis, Sara Pichelli	Ultimate Fallout #4
Rachel Cole		2011 (August)	Greg Rucka, Marco Checchetto	Punisher Vol 9 #1
Samuel "Sam" Alexander	Nova	2011 (November)	Jeph Loeb, Ed McGuinness	Marvel Point One #1
Ava Ayala	White Tiger	2011 (October)	Christos Gage, Tom Raney	Avengers Academy #20
Kubark and Ava'Dara Naganandini	Kubark: Kid Gladiator and Ava'Dara: Warbird	2011 (October)	Brian Michael Bendis, Sara Pichelli	Wolverine and the X-Men #1
Nicholas Joseph "Nick" Fury Jr. and Philip J. "Phil" Coulson		2011 (November) (Note: Nick Fury Jr. and Phil Coulson first appeared in the MCU movie Iron Man.)	Cullen Bunn, Christopher Yost, Matt Fraction, Scot Eaton	Battle Scars #1
Thori		2011 (December)	Kieron Gillen, Doug Braithwaite	Journey into Mystery #632
María Aracely Penalba	Hummingbird	2012 (January)	Ryan Stegman, Christopher Yost, Carlo Barberi	Scarlet Spider vol. 2 #1
Andrew "Andy" Maguire	Alpha	2012 (August)	Dan Slott, Humberto Ramos	Amazing Spider-Man #692
Trevor Hawkins	Eye-Boy	2012 (October)	Jason Aaron, Nick Bradshaw	Wolverine and the X-Men #19
Darla Deering	Miss Thing	2012 (October )	Matt Fraction, Mike Allred	Marvel NOW! Point One #1
Jia Jing	Sprite	2012 (October)	Jason Aaron, Adam Kubert	Avengers vs. X-Men #12
Team: Avengers Unity Division 'or' Squad		2012 (October)	Rick Remender, John Cassaday	Uncanny Avengers #1
Ian Rogers		2012 (November)	Rick Remender, John Romita Jr, Klaus Janson	Captain America vol. 7 #1
Eva Bell and Christopher "Chris" Muse	Eva: Tempus; Chris: Triage	2012 (November)	Brian Bendis, Stuart Immonen	All-New X-Men #1
Iara dos Santos	Shark-Girl	2012 (November)	Jason Aaron, Nick Bradshaw	Wolverine and the X-Men #20
Adam Blackveil	Nightmask	First true appearance: 2012 (December) as a Hero: 2013 (January)	Jonathan Hickman, Jerome Opeña	Avengers Vol 5 #1 and #3
Benjamin "Benji" Deeds	Morph	2012 (December)	Brian Bendis, Stuart Immonen	All-New X-Men #3
Isabel "Izzy" Kane	Currently: Smasher; Former: Messenger	2012 (December)	Jonathan Hickman, Jerome Opeña	Avengers Vol. 5 #1
Rebecca "Becca" Ryker	Death Locket	2012 (December)	Dennis Hallum, Kev Walker	Avengers Arena #1
Aiden Gillespie	Anachronism	2012 (December)	Dennis Hallum, Kev Walker	Avengers Arena #1
Aikku Jokinen	Currently: Pod-2; Former: Pod, Enigma	2013 (January Shadow), (July Full)	Jonathan Hickman, Stefano Caselli	Avengers Vol 5 #4 (Shadow); Avengers Vol 5 #15 (Full)
Otto Octavius	Superior Spider-Man	2012 (December), (January Full)	Dan Slott, Ryan Stegman	The Amazing Spider-Man #700
Andrea "Andi" Benton	Scream	2013 (February)	Cullen Bunn, Declan Shalvey	Venom Vol. 2 #31
Fabio Medina	Currently: Egg; Former: Goldballs	2013 (February)	Brian Bendis, Chris Bachalo	Uncanny X-Men Vol. 3 #1
Kevin Kale Connor	Starbrand	2013 (March)	Jonathan Hickman, Dustin Weaver	Avengers Vol 5 #7
David Bond	Hijack	2013 (May)	Brian Michael Bendis, Frazer Irving	Uncanny X-Men Vol 3 #6
Alexis	Protector	2013 (June)	Sam Humphries, André Lima Araújo	Age of Ultron #10
Doombot C-53	Doombot	2013 (June)	Mark Waid, André Lima Araújo	Age of Ultron #10AI
Selah Burke	Sun Girl	2013 (July)	Christopher Yost, David López	Superior Spider-Man Team-Up #1
Kamala Khan	Ms. Marvel	2013 (July)	Sana Amanat	Captain Marvel Vol 7 #14
Roberto "Robbie" Reyes	Ghost Rider	2014 (March)	Felipe Smith, Tradd Moore	All-New Ghost Rider #1
Cindy Moon	Silk	2014 (April)	Dan Slott, Humberto Ramos	The Amazing Spider-Man vol. 3 #1
Lin Li	Nature Girl	2014 (March)	Jason Latour, Mahmud Asrar	Wolverine and the X-Men Vol. 2 #1
Dante Pertuz	Inferno	2014 (April)	Matt Fraction, Charles Soule, Joe Madureira	Inhuman #1
Angela		2014 (July) (Note: Angela was originally created for and debuted in the Image Comics series Spawn in issue number 9 in 1993.)	Neil Gaiman, Todd McFarlane	Original Sin#5.1
Jaycen "Jason"	Currently: Flint; Former: Korvostax	2014 (August)	Charles Soule, Joe Madureira	Inhuman #3
Xiaoyi Chen	Iso	2014 (August)	Charles Soule, Ryan Stegman	Inhuman #4
Gwendolyn Maxine "Gwen" Stacy	Currently: Ghost-Spider; Former:Spider-Gwen, Spider-Woman	2014 (September)	Jason Latour, Robbi Rodriguez	Edge of Spider-Verse Vol. 1 #2
Jane Foster	Currently: Valkyrie; Former: Thor	First true apparent: 1962 (September); As a Hero: 2014 (September)	Stan Lee, Jack Kirby	First true apparent: Journey into Mystery #84; As a Hero: Thor: God of Thunder #25
Frank McGee	Nur	2014 (October)	Charles Soule, Pepe Larraz, Ryan Stegma	Inhuman #7
Melinda May; Leopold "Leo" Fitz and Jemma Simmons		2014 (December) (Note: Melinda May, Leo Fitz and Jemma Simmons first appeared in the TV series Agents of S.H.I.E.L.D..)	Mark Waid, Carlos Pacheco	S.H.I.E.L.D. Vol 3 #1
Singularity		2015 (May)	Marguerite Bennett, G. Willow Wilson, Jorge Molina	A-Force #1
Red Wolf of the Valley of Doom		2015 (July)	Gerry Duggan, Nik Virella	1872 #1
Raz Malhotra	Giant-Man	First true appearance: 2015 (July) as a Hero: 2016 (January)	Nick Spencer, Brent Schoonover	First true appearance: Ant-Man Annual #1 as a Hero: Ultimates Vol 3 #3
Ami Han	White Fox	2015 (October)	Al Ewing, Paco Medina	Contest of Champions #1
Toni Ho	Iron Patriot	2015 (October)	Al Ewing, Gerardo Sandoval	New Avengers Vol. 4 #1
Emily Guerrero	Synapse	2015 (October)	Gerry Duggan, Ryan Stegman	Uncanny Avengers vol 3 #1
Samuel "Sam" Chung	Blindspot	2015 (October)	Charles Soule, Ron Garney	All-New, All-Different Marvel Point One #1
Team: Mercs for Money Original Members: Wade Wilson, James Bourne, Greg Salinger, Terror, Walter Newell New Members: Neena Thurman, Hit-Monkey, Kenneth Hale, Aaron Stack (Impostor), Masacre, Eloise Phimister	Wade: Deadpool James: Solo Greg: Foolkiller Walter: Stingray Neena: Domino Ken: Gorilla-Man Aaron: Machine Man Ellie: Negasonic Teen Warhead	2015 (November)	Gerry Duggan, Mike Hawthorne	Deadpool Vol 6 #1
Gwendolyn "Gwen" Poole	Gwenpool	2015 (November)	Chris Bachalo, Christopher Hastings	Howard the Duck vol 6 #1
Joaquín Torres	Falcon	2015 (November)	Nick Spencer, Daniel Acuña	Captain America: Sam Wilson #3
Gabrielle "Gabby" Kinney	Currently: Scout; Former:Honey Badger	2015 (November)	Tom Taylor, David Lopez, David Navarrot	All-New Wolverine #2
"Viv" Vivian		2015 (November)	Tom King, Gabriel Hernandez Walta	Vision vol 2 #1
Lunella Louise Lafayette	Moon Girl	2015 (November)	Brandon Montclare, Amy Reeder	Moon Girl and Devil Dinosaur #1
Masacre		2015 (December)	Brian Posehn, Gerry Duggan, Scott Koblish	Deadpool Vol 6 #3.1
Kei Kawade	Kid Kaiju	First true appearance: 2016 (February) as a Hero: 2017 (January)	Greg Pak, Frank Cho, Terry Dodson	First true appearance: Totally Awesome Hulk #3 as a Hero: Monsters Unleashed Vol 2 #1
Riri Williams	Ironheart	2016 (March)	Brian Michael Bendis, Stefano Caselli	Invincible Iron Man vol 3 #10
Nadia Van Dyne	Wasp	2016 (May)	Mark Waid, Alex Ross	Free Comic Book Day Vol 2016 Civil War #II
Avril Kincaid	Quasar	2016 (May)	Nick Spencer, Ángel Unzueta	Captain America: Sam Wilson #7
Morris Sackett	Mosaic	2016 (June)	Geoffrey Thorne, Khary Randolph	Uncanny Inhumans #11
Team: Champions; Members: {Ms. Marvel (Kamala Khan), Spider-Man (Miles Morales), Nova (Sam Alexander), Hulk (Amadeus Cho), Vivian and Cyclops (Scott Summers)}		2016 (October)	Mark Waid, Humberto Ramos	Champions vol 2 #1
Kareem	Red Dagger	2016 (October)	G. Willow Wilson, Mirka Andolfo	Ms. Marvel (Vol. 4) #12
Kushala	Currently: Spirit Rider; Former:Demon Rider, Sorcerer Supreme	2016 (October)	Robbie Thompson, Javier Rodriguez	Doctor Strange and the Sorcerers Supreme #1
Johnny Watts	Fuse	2017 (January)	Kelly Thompson, Leonardo Romero	Hawkeye vol 5 #2
Simon Lasker	Pyro	2017 (April)	Marc Guggenheim, Ardian Syaf	X-Men: Gold Vol 2 #1
Rayshaun "Shaun" Lucas	Patriot	2017 (June)	Nick Spencer, Daniel Acuña	Secret Empire: Brave New World # 2
Clayton "Clay" Cortez	Currently: Hulkverine; Former: Weapon H	2017 (July)	Greg Pak, Mike Deodato Jr.	Totally Awesome Hulk #21
Team: Avengers 1000000000 BC: Odin Borson, Agamotto, Mosi, Firehair, Ghost, Fan Fei, Vnn, Moon Knight	Odin, Agamotto, Mosi: Black Panther, Ghost: Ghost Rider, Fan Fei: Iron Fist, Vnn: Starbrand, Moon Knight	2017 (September)	Jason Aaron, Esad Ribić	Marvel Legacy #1
Francis Castle	Currently: The Rider, Cosmic Ghost Rider	2017 (November)	Donny Cates, Geoff Shaw	Thanos vol 2 #13
Va Nee Gast	Voyager	2018 (January)	Mark Waid, Al Ewing, Jim Zub, Michael Allred	Avengers #675
Lei Ling	Aero	2018 (English debut September 2019)	Zhou Liefen, Keng	Aero (Chinese) vol. 1 #1
Lin Lie	Currently: Iron Fist; Former: Sword Master	2018 (May) (English debut July 2019)	Shuizhu, Gunji	Warriors of Three Sovereigns Vol. 1 #1
Amka Aliyak	Snowguard	2018 (April)	Jim Zub, Sean Izaakse	Champions Vol 2 #19
Sleeper		2018 (April )	Mike Costa, Mark Bagley	Venom #165
M'Baku		2018 (May)	Ta-Nehisi Coates, Daniel Acuña	Black Panther (Vol. 7) #1
Franklin Benjamin Richards and Valeria Meghan "Val" Richards	Franklin: Powerhouse and Val: Brainstorm	First true appearance: : Franklin is 1968 (November) and Valeria is 1984 (June) [Miscarried], 2002 (June) [Resurrected] Both as Hero:2018 (September)	Franklin: Stan Lee, Jack Kirby; Valeria: Rafael Marin, Tom Grummett	First true appearance: Franklin is Fantastic Four Annual #6 and Valeria is Fantastic Four #267 (Miscarried), Fantastic Four Vol. 3 #54 (Resurrected); Both as Hero:Fantastic Four Vol. 6 #2
Gib	Former: Old God	2018 (September)	Rainbow Rowell, David Lafuente	Runaways Vol 5 #13
Jeff the Land Shark		2019 (January)	Kelly Thompson, Daniele Di Nicuolo	West Coast Avengers (Vol. 3) #7
Tiana Toomes	Starling	2019 (April)	Saladin Ahmed, Javier Garrón	Miles Morales: Spider-Man #5
Seol Hee; Pearl Pangan and Dan Bi	Seol: Luna Snow; Pearl: Wave and Dan: Crescent	2019 (May) (Note: Luna Snow and Crescent first appeared in the game Marvel: Future Fight.)	Greg Pak, Gang Hyuk Lim	War of the Realms: New Agents of Atlas #1
Isaac Ikeda	Protector	2019 (August)	Greg Pak, Nico Leon	Agents of Atlas Vol 3 #1
Andrea "Andi" Benton	Currently: Silence Formerly: Scream, Mania	First True Appearance: 2013 (February) As a Hero: 2019 (October)	Cullen Bunn, Declan Shalvey	Absolute Carnage: Scream #3

=== 2020s ===
Real name / Team / Series	Codename	Year debuted	Creator/s	First appearance
School: Strange Academy; Faculty: Agatha Harkness Students: Doyle Dormammu; Emily Bright; Calvin Morse; Shaylee Moonpeddle; Alvi Brorson; Iric Brorson; Dessy; Zoe Laveau; Toth; Guslaug and Germán Aguilar		2020 (March)	Skottie Young, Humberto Ramos	Strange Academy #1
Fadi Fadlalah	Amulet	2020 (March)	Saladin Ahmed, Sara Alfageeh	Magnificent Ms. Marvel #13
Lauri-Ell		2020 (July)	Kelly Thompson, Cory Smith	Captain Marvel Vol 10 #18
Jake Gomez	Werewolf by Night	2020 (October)	Taboo, Benjamin Jackendoff, Scot Eaton	Werewolf by Night Vol 3 #1
Rūna	Valkyrie	2021 (January)	Jason Aaron, Torunn Grønbekk, Nina Vakueva	King in Black: Return of the Valkyries #1
Team: Children of the Atom; Members: Beatrice "Buddy" Bartholomew; Gabriel "Gabe" Brathwaite; Jason "Jay" Thomas; Benjamin "Benny" Thomas and Carmen Maria Cruz	Buddy: Cyclops-Lass; Gabe: Cherub; Jay: Daycrawler; Benny: Marvel Guy and Carmen: Gimmick	2021 (March)	Vita Ayala, Bernard Chang	Children of the Atom #1
Jackie Chopra	Black Knight	2021 (March)	Simon Spurrier, Sergio Dávila	Black Knight: Curse of the Ebony Blade #1
Shift		2021 (April)	Saladin Ahmed, Carmen Carnero	Miles Morales: Spider-Man #25
Bren Waters	Toxin	2021 (April)	Steve Orlando, Gerardo Sandoval, Victor Nava	King in Black: Planet of the Symbiotes #3
Carl Valentino	Somnus	2021 (June)	Steve Orlando, Claudia Aguirre, Luciano Vecchio	Marvel's Voices: Pride #1
Aaron Fischer	Captain America	2021 (June)	Josh Trujillo, Jan Bazaldua	United States of Captain America #1
Carl "Crusher" Creel and Mary MacPherran	Carl: Absorbing Man Mary: Titania	First True Appearance: Absorbing Man: 1964 (February)/1965 (January) Titania: 1984 (March) As Heroes: 2021 (June)	Absorbing Man: Stan Lee, Bill Everett, Jack Kirby Titania: Jim Shooter, Mike Zeck	First True Appearance: Absorbing Man:Daredevil #1/Journey Into Mystery #114 Titania:Marvel Super Heroes Secret Wars #3 As Heroes: Gamma Flight #1
Dr. Yehya Badr	Hunter's Moon	2021 (July)	Jed MacKay, Alessandro Cappuccio	Moon Knight Vol 9 #1
Zheng Zhilan	Sister Staff	2021 (July)	Gene Luen Yang, Dike Ruan	Shang-Chi Vol 2 #3
Tosin Oduye	The Wakandan	2022 (January)	John Ridley, Germán Peralta	Black Panther (Vol. 8) #3
Shela Sexton	Escapade	2022 (June)	Charlie Jane Anders, Ro Stein, Ted Brandt	Marvel's Voices: Pride (Vol. 2) #1
Amass		2022 (July)	Steve Orlando, Eleonora Carlini	Marauders (Vol. 2) #4
Gutsen Glory		2022 (August)	Jim Zub, Sean Izaakse	Thunderbolts (Vol. 5) #1
Eegro	The Unbreakable	2022 (September)	Jim Zub, Sean Izaakse	Thunderbolts (Vol. 5) #2
Rasputin IV		2023 (March)	Kieron Gillen, Lucas Werneck	Spider-Man Vol 4 #7
Bailey Briggs	Spider-Boy	2023 (April)	Dan Slott, Humberto Ramos	Immoral X-Men #2
Jon Ironfire	Ironfire	2023 (May)	Al Ewing, Paco Medina	X-Men: Red (Vol. 2) #11
Layla El-Faouly	Scarlet Scarab	2023 (July)	Jed MacKay, Alessandro Vitti	Moon Knight (Vol. 9) #25
Ser Reddwyn	Wyn	2023 (May)	Jonathan Hickman, Valerio Schiti	Free Comic Book Day 2023: Avengers/X-Men #1
Mary Jane Watson	Currently: Venom, Formerly: Jackpot	2023 (August) as Jackpot, 2024 (December) as Venom	Stan Lee, Steve Ditko, John Romita Sr.	Amazing Spider-Man (Vol. 6) #31, All-New Venom #1
Yelena Belova	White Widow	First True Appearance: 1999(January) As a Hero: 2023(November)	Devin Grayson, J.G. Jones, Paul Jenkins, Jae Lee	First Real Appearance: Inhumans Vol. 2 #5 As Hero: White Widow #1
Jin Joon-Sung	Kid Juggernaut	2024 (May)	Anthony Oliveira, Minkyu Jung	Marvel's Voices Infinity Comic #100
Akihiro	Hellverine	2024 (May)	Daniel Way, Steve Dillon	Hellverine #1
Kahhori		2024 (November)	Ryan Little	Kahhori: Reshaper of Worlds #1
David Colton	Captain America	2025 (July)	Chip Zdarsky, Valerio Schiti	Captain America Vol.14 #1
