= White Fox (character) =

Marvel Comics superhero

- Ami Han / White Fox. Textless variant cover of Death of Doctor Strange: White Fox (December 1, 2021). Art by R1c0.

Publication information
- Publisher: Marvel Comics
- First appearance: Avengers: Electric Rain #1 (October 2014)
- Created by: Young hoon Ko

In-story information
- Alter ego: Ami Han
- Species: Kumiho
- Place of origin: Seoul, South Korea
- Team affiliations: National Intelligence Service; Agents of Atlas; Tiger Division; Avengers
- Partnerships: Lin Lie
- Notable aliases: Agent F-One; White Fox
- Abilities: Kumiho physiology granting: Superhuman strength, speed, agility, durability, stamina, and senses; Communication with animals; Life force energy absorption; Fox transformation; Hypnosis; Claws; Trained hand-to-hand combatant

White Fox (Ami Han (Korean: 한아미, RR: Han Ami)) is a superhero appearing in American comic books published by Marvel Comics. Created by writer and artist Young hoon Ko, the character first appeared in Avengers: Electric Rain #1. Ami Han is a superhero from South Korea. She belongs to a species of shapeshifting nine-tailed foxes called Kumiho.

== Development ==
=== Concept and creation ===
Ami Han is based on the Korean legend of the nine-tailed fox. She first appeared as an original character in a Marvel-licensed webtoon produced by Disney Korea. Marvel Comics Editor-in-Chief C. B. Cebulski later stated, "The character has proven to be so popular that we’ve decided to take it from Korea. She’ll be joining the Avengers characters in the U.S. comic series." Writer Alyssa Wong commented, "Ami Han is a Kumiho who grew up without a Kumiho community, surrounded only by stories about how her kind is evil, heartless, and vicious. There's a certain grief that comes from that cultural isolation and external hatred, and it's something she's had to grapple with her entire life. I find that deeply compelling and resonant."

=== Publication history ===
==== 2010s ====
Ami Han debuted in Avengers: Electric Rain #1 (October 2014), created by writer and artist Young hoon Ko. She later appeared in the 2015 Contest of Champions series. She appeared in the 2016 Totally Awesome Hulk series. She appeared in the 2016 Civil War II: Choosing Sides anthology series. She appeared in the 2019 Domino: Hotshots series. She appeared in the 2019 Future Fight Firsts: White Fox one-shot, her first solo comic book. According to Diamond Comic Distributors, it was the 147th best selling comic book in October 2019. She appeared in the 2019 War of the Realms: New Agents of Atlas series.

==== 2020s ====
Ami Han appeared in the 2020 Taskmaster series. She appeared in the 2021 Black Cat Annual one-shot. She later appeared in the 2021 Death of Doctor Strange: White Fox one-shot, her second solo comic book. According to Diamond Comic Distributors, it was the 124th best selling comic book in December 2021. She appeared in the Marvel Unlimited exclusive 2022 White Fox Infinity Comics series, her first solo comic book series. She appeared in the 2023 Tiger Division series. She appeared in the 2023 Spider-Gwen Annual one-shot. White Fox had a major supporting role in the 2026 limited series Deadly Hands of K'un-Lun.

== Fictional character biography ==
Ami Han belongs to a mystical race of nine-tailed foxes known as Kumihos. They are said to be creatures who can turn into beautiful women. They seduce men in order to eat their heart. She was raised by her Kumiho mother. She was taught how to hunt and transform into a Kumiho. However, her mother was killed by Samjokgus, another species of shapeshifters, who are the predators of Kumihos. Ami Han lived with her aunt and her uncle afterwards.

She joined the National Intelligence Service, the chief intelligence agency of South Korea. She later became the director of the agency and used the codename White Fox before she was recruited by the Avengers.

When Ami became Director of Tiger Division, Taskmaster broke into their headquarters on Buramsan Mountain to steal her genetic signature. Taskmaster hid in a vent waiting for an opportunity to strike, but Ami's enhanced senses alerted her to his presence. He made a run for it, but Ami corned him as White Fox and fought him in a hallway. Using his advanced learning abilities and watching her fight, Taskmaster was able to deduce that White Fox and Ami Han are the same person. Black Widow, who has been hunting Taskmaster, stops the fight and unintentionally gives him the opportunity to escape with White Fox's genetic signature.

During the "Death of Doctor Strange" event, White Fox and Sword Master are sent to stop an undead Kumiho who was terrorizing the Korean countryside. Although the Kumiho is defeated, it destroys Sword Master's Sword of Fu Xi and throws him into a ravine. Despite the help of the Agents of Atlas and Tiger Division, Lin Lie is unable to be found, with White Fox only recovering a single shard from the Sword. A guilt-ridden White Fox takes a break from superheroics but goes back into duty when the human supremacist Sunset Order begin targeting innocent dokkabei.

Unbeknownst to Ami, Lin Lie was rescued by Shou-Lao, who turned him into the new Iron Fist. Ami and Lie are reunited during the A.X.E.: Judgment Day storyline.

During the "One World Under Doom" storyline, White Fox renames Tiger Division as Doom's Division under Doctor Doom's orders with the team being restructured to be a Pan-Asian peacekeeping alliance by adding Aero, Wave, and Karma to the group. White Fox sends the team to deal with Sunfire who has started a resistance against Doom. However, Wave and Karma reveal themselves to be double agents working for Sunfire and leads Doom's Division into a ambush by Sunfire and his resistance. As Sunfire convinces Taegukgi into forming a truce against Doom, White Fox suddenly appears, kills Sunfire by absorbing his soul through a kiss, and orders Doom's Division to be arrested for treason. When Doom's Division escapes imprisonment with help from Luna Snow, Lady Bright and Gun-R, White Fox confronts them. White Fox arrives with the still-alive Sunfire, revealing that she helped fake his death and was secretly supporting his resistance movement but did not want to rouse Doom's suspicions. White Fox covers up the escape of the reunited Doom's Division, who revert back to the Tiger Division and begin openly defying Doom's regime.

In Deadly Hands of K'un-Lun, White Fox and Lie become romantically involved and she joins him in the effort to liberate K'un-Lun from Lin Feng.

== Powers and abilities ==
Ami Han has a range of superpowers owing to her Kumiho physiology, including superhuman strength, speed, agility, durability, stamina, and senses, as well as retractable claws. She normally assumes a humanoid form, but is able to transform back into a Kumiho. She is able to communicate with other animals. She has the ability to absorb the energy of others to rehabilitate her power. Ami Han can control other beings with the use of her voice. Additionally, she is a trained hand-to-hand combatant.

== Reception ==
James Ferguson of Comicon.com described Ami Han as one of Marvel's "feisty femme fatales." Samantha Puc of ComicsBeat called Ami Han one of Marvel’s "badass women" and "leading femme fatales" Angela Davis of Screen Rant stated that Ami Han is a "fan favorite hero," while Jules Chin Greene found that the character fits "perfectly into the brand of heroism that Marvel has championed for decades" owing to her "cultural specificities offering a new spin on familiar themes."

Aja Romano of The Daily Dot described Ami Han as "badass" and "beautiful" and said that she "proved hugely popular with Korean comics fans." Previews World called Ami Han a "fan-favorite character." George Marston of Newsarama described Ami Han as a "breakout Marvel star."

== In other media ==
- Ami Han / White Fox appears as a playable character in Marvel: Future Fight.
- Ami Han / White Fox appears as a playable character in Marvel Rivals, voiced by Jennifer Sun Bell.
