= Atlantis Attacks =

Marvel Comics superhero crossover storyline

- In-house ad for "Atlantis Attacks"
- Publisher: Marvel Comics
- Publication date: 1989
- Genre: Superhero; Crossover
Title(s)
- The Amazing Spider-Man Annual #23
- The Avengers Annual #18
- Avengers West Coast #52-56
- Avengers West Coast Annual #4
- Daredevil Annual #5
- Fantastic Four Annual #22
- Iron Man Annual #10
- The New Mutants #76
- The New Mutants Annual #5
- The Punisher Annual #2
- Silver Surfer Annual #2
- The Spectacular Spider-Man Annual #9
- Thor Annual #14
- Web of Spider-Man Annual #5
- X-Factor Annual #4
- X-Men Annual #13
- Marvel Comics Presents #26
- What If...? (vol. 2) #25
- Marvel Age #76

Creative team
- Writers: Terry Austin; Mike Baron; John Byrne; Gerry Conway; Steve Engelhart; Michael Higgins; David Michelinie; Louise Simonson; Roy Thomas
- Pencillers: Mark Bagley; Rich Buckler; John Byrne; Rob Liefeld; Al Milgrom; Walter Simonson; Mike Vosburg; Ron Wilson
- Letterers: Janice Chiang; Rick Parker
- Editors: Bob Harras; Ralph Macchio; Howard Mackie; Jim Salicrup

"Atlantis Attacks" was a comic book superhero crossover storyline which ran through most of the summer annuals published by Marvel Comics in 1989.

The storyline regards the return of the seven-headed Elder God Set at the hands of the various underwater empires of the Marvel Universe. The title is misleading, as Atlantis and its then-leader Attuma only play minor roles in the story as flunkies for the real masterminds: the Lemurians and their leader Llyra.

In 2020, Marvel Comics published a second Atlantis Attacks miniseries, which is unrelated to the original.

== Publication history ==
Atlantis Attacks continued and expanded the format created by 1988's The Evolutionary War crossover storyline, in which all of Marvel's superhero annuals were tied into one story. Where "The Evolutionary War" had had 11 parts, Atlantis Attacks had 14, as Marvel revived the annual format for Daredevil, Iron Man, and Thor (which were not given annuals in 1988) as part of the storyline. The Daredevil Annual is mistakenly numbered "4", the same as the previous annual in the series. In an effort to minimize the resulting confusion, this annual is often numbered "4b" in price guides and retailer listings.

Also, unlike The Evolutionary War annuals, which were mainly standalone stories loosely connected by the presence of the High Evolutionary, Atlantis Attacks was a true serial, with many of the annuals ending on cliffhangers that would be resolved in the next installment.

Every annual contained a back-up story called "The Serpent Crown Saga", written by Peter Sanderson with pencil art by Mark Bagley. This story explained the history of the Serpent Crown and recounted all its previous appearances.

== Plot ==
Ghaur baits the Silver Surfer into restoring his physical form by hijacking the Surfer's surfboard. After a brief battle, Ghaur escapes and flees to Earth, where he convinces Lemuria's ruler, Llyra, to form an alliance to summon Set back to Earth. To resurrect Set, Ghaur intends to build a new Serpent Crown, transform humanity into reptilian creatures, and use the Crown and Dagger as conduits to transfer Set's essence into a seven-headed serpent body.

Ghaur and Llyra's plans are countered at just about every turn by Earth's heroes, culminating with the Avengers, the Fantastic Four, and Namor (who is believed dead for the bulk of the storyline during a skirmish with Iron Man and Attuma's military forces) defeating Ghaur and Llyra and stopping them from bringing Set to Earth.

== Cast of characters ==
=== Heroes ===
- The Avengers
  - Black Panther
  - Captain America
  - Captain Marvel
  - Hawkeye
  - Hank Pym
  - Human Torch
  - Hulk
  - Iron Man
  - Mockingbird
  - Moondragon
  - Rick Jones
  - Scarlet Witch
  - Sersi
  - She-Hulk
  - Thor
  - Tigra
  - Vision
  - Wasp
  - Wonder Man
- Cloak and Dagger
- Daredevil
- Doctor Strange
- Fantastic Four
  - Mister Fantastic
  - Human Torch
  - Invisible Woman
  - The Thing
- Moon Knight
- Namor
- Namorita
- New Mutants
  - Boom-Boom
  - Cannonball
  - Rictor
  - Rusty Collins
  - Sunspot
  - Warlock
  - Wolfsbane
- Punisher
- Quasar
- Silver Surfer
- Spider-Man
- X-Factor
  - Beast
  - Jean Grey
- X-Men
  - Dazzler
  - Wolverine
  - Rogue
  - Storm
  - Colossus
  - Longshot
  - Havok
  - Psylocke

=== Villains ===
- Abomination
- Attuma
- Ghaur
- Llyra
- Lord Arno
- Mister Jip
- Serpent Society
  - Diamondback
  - Sidewinder
- Set the Old Serpent
- Tyrak
- Tyrannus
- U-Man
- Viper
- Warlord Krang

== Bibliography ==
- Marvel Comics Presents #26 (Mr. Fixit [the Hulk] battles a killer whale)
- Part 1: Silver Surfer Annual #2
- Part 2: Iron Man Annual #10
- Part 3: X-Men Annual #13
- Part 4: The Amazing Spider-Man Annual #23
- Part 5: The Punisher Annual #2
- Part 6: The Spectacular Spider-Man Annual #9
- Part 7: Daredevil Annual #5 (mislabeled as Annual #4)
- Part 8: Avengers Annual #18
- Interlude: New Mutants #76 (return of Namor, consumption of tuna fish sandwiches and intro of the monster summoning horn)
- Part 9: New Mutants Annual #5
- Part 10: X-Factor Annual #4
- Part 11: Web of Spider-Man Annual #5
- Interlude: Avengers West Coast #56
- Part 12: Avengers West Coast Annual #4
- Part 13: Thor Annual #14
- Part 14: Fantastic Four Annual #22

Collected edition:

Atlantis Attacks Omnibus (2011; collecting the above issues), Atlantis Attacks Paperback (2021, same as before)

== Alternate versions ==
What If... ? (vol. 2) #25 (May 1991), by Jim Valentino and Rik Levins, explored the question "What if the Marvel Super Heroes had lost Atlantis Attacks?" (interior title "What if Set Had Come to Earth?"). In the story, only a handful of Earth's heroes (as well as villains Doctor Doom and Sabretooth) avoided being turned into serpent men. With the help of Thor (who is horribly burned and placed in stasis to keep him alive), Silver Surfer and Quasar destroy two of Set's heads before Quasar traps himself and Set in the Eye of Agamotto. The Silver Surfer gives the Eye to the Watcher for safe keeping. However, Set's children survive and leave to terrorize alternate universes.

== Atlantis Attacks (2020) ==
"Atlantis Attacks"
- Publisher: Marvel Comics
- Publication date: January 2020
- Genre: Superhero; Crossover; Limited series
- Main character(s): Agents of Atlas; Namor

Creative team
- Writer: Greg Pak
- Artist: Ario Anindito

30 years after the crossover storyline, the title was revisited as a five-issue limited series, written by Greg Pak with art by Ario Andito. The new storyline pitted the Agents of Atlas against Namor.

After discovering that the Big Nguyen Company has stolen Atlantis' sacred guardian dragon and are using her magic to power the portal city of Pan, an enraged Namor attacks the city, only to be thwarted by the New Agents of Atlas, Pan's protectors. After Amadeus Cho (Brawn) tells him that immediately releasing the dragon would disrupt the portals holding the city together, Namor gives the team one day to return the dragon or else face the wrath of Atlantis.

While most of the Agents of Atlas work to bolster Pan's defenses and to free the dragon without disrupting Pan's portals, Atlas' leader Jimmy Woo sends Namora, Venus, Aero, and Wave to Atlantis for a diplomatic mission. Wary of Namora's familial ties with Namor, Brawn discretely orders Shang-Chi and Sword Master to tail her. Upon arrival, Wave is warmly greeted by Namor due to her recent role in defeating the Sirenas, longtime enemies of Atlantis. Wave and Aero explain they only defeated a villainous faction of the Sirenas, but their words fall on deaf ears when Atlantis' citizens come out to celebrate Wave's arrival. Brawn, Uranian, 3-D Man, and M-11 eventually find a way to replicate the dragon's magical energy to power Pan's portals, and the dragon is safely freed from captivity. However, when the dragon arrives back home, she unexpectedly goes berserk and begins attacking the underwater kingdom. After the dragon is subdued, Atlantis' scientists discover the source of the dragon's behavior to be an implant embedded in her scales. Namor accuses Brawn to be behind the deception and immediately flies to Pan for revenge. Namor violently ambushes Brawn and proceeds to attack the Big Nguyen Company's CEO and Pan's founder Mike Nguyen in his personal tower at the Heart of Pan, but is stopped by the combined efforts of the Pan Guard and Brawn, who sends Namor flying back into the ocean. While the rest of the Atlas agents prepare themselves for another attack from Namor, Nguyen reveals that he's also recruited the Sirenas to help defend Pan from Atlantis.

With help from the Sirenas, Namor is eventually overpowered and imprisoned. During a meeting between the Agents of Atlas, the Pan Guard and the Sirenas, a disagreement erupts when Nguyen and the Sirenas' leader Sea Hunter propose to launch a retaliatory attack Atlantis. Namora accuses the Sirenas of treachery, revealing the dragon's implant to be made from Sirena tech. After Namora and Carina of the Sirenas recount their people's history, the group finds itself torn between protecting Pan, attacking or defending Atlantis. The disagreement eventually escalates into trading blows when several members within the group take sides between the Atlanteans and the Sirenas. During the commotion, Namor escapes prison.

Namor swiftly subdues the combined group and flies back to the heart of Pan, threatening Nguyen and Pan's citizens as retribution for attacking his kingdom. A hologram of Nguyen offers an alliance between Pan, Atlantis and the Sirenas to Namor; before the king could retort the recovered Agents are able to catch up to Namor and resume fighting him. Brawn talks down the combatants and confronts Woo over the secrets that he has withheld from the team. Woo reveals to all that for thousands of years, ancient dragons have served as advisors for human rulers, with the Atlas Foundation having its own dragon, Mr. Lao, serving him as well. As fighting each other openly would raze the planet, dragons have used humans as proxies in their own personal conflicts against each other, making them responsible for almost every major war in history. Woo is content with this balance of power, but Nguyen suggests uniting the world under Pan, proposing to Namor and Woo that by harvesting the power of their dragons, they could overtake the rest of them.

With Namor preoccupied, the Sirenas use the opportunity to head to Atlantis to destroy its dragon, bringing a reluctant Wave along with them. Upon arrival, they discover that despite being freed of her implant, the sea serpent continues to rampage across the kingdom. Wave effortlessly incapacitates the dragon without killing her. To the Sirenas' shock, the Atlanteans celebrate Wave's actions. As Namor returns to Atlantis with Namora, Venus and Aero, the rest of the Agents uncover Nguyen in his personal bunker and confront him. Having anticipated this, Nguyen attaches a Sirena tech implant onto Amadeus, transforming him into the Hulk.

Under Nguyen's control, the Hulk makes quick work of the Atlas Agents. To prevent any further invasions against Pan, Nguyen commands the Hulk to kill Namor, much to the shock and anger of Pan's citizens. In Atlantis, just as Wave is able to get Namor and Carina to come to a truce, Silk warns the group a mild-controlled Hulk is on his way to destroy Atlantis. With help from the Agents, Namor is able to isolate himself and the Hulk to a deserted island two miles from the Heart of Pan for their fight. As the Hulk pummels Namor, Sword Master distracts him long enough for Shang-Chi to remove the device, freeing Amadeus from Nguyen's control and reverting him back to Brawn. They are too late, as Brawn has already caused a massive tsunami that is heading towards the Heart of Pan. With some goading from Woo and Namor, Brawn transforms back into Hulk and creates another shockwave to weaken the tsunami with help from Namor, Wave, Aero, and Luna Snow. The city is saved, although Nguyen dies protecting a Madripoorian refugee and her young son from the tsunami.

One month later at the Heart of Pan, Woo announces to the Agents and Pan's new leadership at a banquet that Atlantis and the Sirenas have signed a non-aggression pact, recognizing Pan as an independent nation. Woo congratulates Delegate Angie Thrasapalt, the refugee Nguyen rescued, on winning her election. Still feeling guilty for Nguyen's death and angered with Woo's machinations, Amadeus quits the team. As Mr. Lao laments losing Amadeus as a potential leader, he and Woo plan their next move: helping Namor fight the King in Black.
