= Agents of Atlas =

Fictional superhero team in comic books published by Marvel Comics

- Variant cover of Agents of Atlas #1; Art by Carlo Pagulayan

Group publication information
- Publisher: Marvel Comics
- First appearance: Agents of Atlas #1 (Oct. 2006)
- Created by: Jeff Parker (writer); Leonard Kirk (artist)

In-story information
- Type of organization: Team
- Base(s): Marvel Boy's spaceship The Temple of Atlas, San Francisco; The Pan-Asian School for the Unusually Gifted, Mumbai; Atlas Secret Bunker 394B, Seoul
- Leader(s): Jimmy Woo (Head of the Atlas Foundation); Derek Khanata; Mr. Lao; Temugin
- Agent(s): Current: Aero; Brawn; Crescent and Io; Giant-Man; Gorilla-Man; Leiko Wu; Luna Snow; M-11; Ms. Marvel; Namora; Protector of Pan; Silk; Sister Dagger; Sword Master; The Uranian; Venus; Wave; White Fox; Former: 3-D Man; Shang-Chi

Agents of Atlas

Series publication information
- Schedule: Monthly
- Format: (vol. 1); Limited series (vol. 2); Ongoing series (vol. 3); Limited series
- Genre: Spy, superhero
- Publication date: (vol. 1); Oct. 2006 – March 2007 (vol. 2); April – Nov. 2009 (vol. 3); May 2019 – February 2020
- Number of issues: (vol. 1); 6 (vol. 2); 11 (vol. 3); 9

Creative team
- Writer(s): (vol. 1 & 2); Jeff Parker (vol. 3); Greg Pak
- Artist(s): (vol. 3); Nico Leon
- Penciller(s): (vol. 1); Leonard Kirk (vol. 2); Carlo Pagulayan (vol. 3); Greg Hyuk Lim
- Inker(s): (vol. 1); Kris Justice (vol. 2); Michael Jason Paz
- Letterer(s): (vol. 1); David Lanphear (vol. 2); Nate Piekos (vol. 3); Clayton Cowles
- Colorist(s): (vol. 1); Michelle Madsen (vol. 2); Jana Schirmer (vol. 3); Federico Blee
- Creator(s): Jeff Parker (writer); Leonard Kirk (artist)
- Editor(s): (vol. 1); Nathan Cosby; Mark Paniccia; Joe Quesada (vol. 2); Nathan Cosby; Mark Paniccia; Lauren Sankovitch (vol. 3); Tom Groneman; Mark Paniccia

Collected editions
- Agents of Atlas HC: ISBN 0-7851-2712-7
- Dark Reign HC: ISBN 0-7851-3898-6
- Turf War HC: ISBN 0-7851-4276-2
- War of the Realms TPB: ISBN 1-302-91877-X

The Agents of Atlas are a superhero team appearing in American comic books published by Marvel Comics. The first lineup was composed of characters originally appearing in unrelated stories published in the 1950s by Marvel's predecessor company, Atlas Comics. The characters debuted as a team in What If #9 (June 1978) and starred in the 2006 limited series Agents of Atlas, written by Jeff Parker and with art by Leonard Kirk.

In 2019, the team's lineup was revamped as a new team made up of Asian and Asian American superheroes as The New Agents of Atlas, written by Greg Pak and art by Gang Hyuk Lim.

== Publication history ==
The original Agents of Atlas. Art by Leonard Kirk.

This group of heroes, which was not a team in 1950s comics, was established through retroactive continuity as having been formed in the 1950s. They originally appeared as a group in the alternate-universe story What If #9 (June 1978) and then reappeared in Avengers Forever (1998–2000 miniseries), in which they and their reality were destroyed.

The limited series Agents of Atlas #1–6 (Oct. 2006 – March 2007) was set in the present day and likewise set in mainstream continuity. The series emerged from what writer Parker called "a huge editorial hunch" at Marvel, and said the revival of the characters "is something that [editor] Mark Paniccia was looking at and [for which he] thought specifically of me, and asked me what I would do with it". Paniccia says the idea came to him when he picked up a copy of the What if? story and found the cover "intriguing".

The team made a brief appearance in "The Resistance", an eight-page story that was part of the Secret Invasion crossover story arc. Parker and editor Paniccia said in July 2008, that the former would write an Agents of Atlas ongoing series which was one of the titles launched as part of the "Dark Reign" storyline. That series ended after eleven issues but the title relaunched as part of the "Heroic Age" under the title Atlas because, according to Parker, it not only makes for a smaller logo but it is a "natural progression to what most people call the book and the team". The series was canceled with Atlas #5.

During War of the Realms a new iteration of the Agents of Atlas debuted in the War of the Realms: Agents of Atlas mini-series. This new team, along with the classic roster, was featured together in the limited series Agents of Atlas.

== Characters ==
The original team, with the individual characters' debuts in chronological order, consists of:

- Namora – Marvel Mystery Comics #82 (May 1947)
- Venus – Venus #1 (Aug. 1948)
- Marvel Boy/the Uranian – Marvel Boy #1 (Dec. 1950)
- Gorilla-Man – Men's Adventures #26 (Mar. 1954)
- M-11/the Human Robot – Menace #11 (May 1954)
- Jimmy Woo – Yellow Claw #1 (Oct. 1956)

Other characters from the original What if? story, such as Jann of the Jungle, made guest appearances. Parker explained that original What if? team-member the 3-D Man was left out "[b]ecause he wasn't really around in the 1950s" books, having been introduced in 1977 in Marvel Premiere, with stories set in the 1950s.

After the Agents of Atlas took over the Atlas Foundation, the following characters joined as Atlas Foundation members:

- Mr. Lao – Adviser to the Head of the Atlas Foundation. A dragon who was the Yellow Claw's adviser, now adviser to Jimmy Woo, the new Head of the Atlas Foundation.
- Temugin – Second in Command of the Atlas Foundation.
- Derek Khanata – Overseer of Atlas.
- At the end of the series, the contemporary 3-D Man was invited to join the team, and he did.

During the War of the Realms, Jimmy Woo recruited several of his teammates from the Asian American superhero team the Protectors as well as several new Asian superheroes to form The New Agents of Atlas to stop the Queen of Cinders invading the Asian continent. The current members consist of:

- Aero - Chinese heroine with wind-based powers.
- Brawn - Korean-American former Hulk and supergenius.
- Crescent and Io - South Korean heroine and her magical bear.
- Luna Snow - South Korean K-Pop idol with ice-based powers.
- Shang-Chi - the Master of Kung-Fu.
- Silk - Korean-American Spider-Man ally.
- Sword Master - Chinese mystical sword-wielding hero.
- Wave - Filipina water manipulator.
- White Fox - South Korean super spy and the last of the kumiho.

The Pakistani-American polymorph Ms. Marvel was given membership along with the other Protectors, but left to rejoin the Champions. M-41 Zu, a mystically enhanced android created by Jimmy and the Atlas foundation, briefly joined the team under the guise of the Hawaiian volcano goddess Pele. The Immortal Monkey King Sun Wukong of the Ascendants briefly assisted the team as well.

When most of the Agents are summoned to the portal city of Pan, they are introduced to the current Giant-Man, Raz Malhotra, who is recruited into Atlas by Amadeus when rejecting Mike Nguyen's offer to become Pan's protectors. Following the Atlantis Attacks storyline, Brawn and Shang-Chi leave the team while Issac Ikeda, the Protector of Pan, officially joins the team.

During the joint venture between Shang-Chi's Five Weapons Society and the Atlas Foundation to take down Crossfire, Brawn and Ms. Marvel rejoin while Sister Dagger and Leiko Wu are recruited.

== Fictional team biography ==
The group was formed in spring 1958 by Federal Bureau of Investigation agent Jimmy Woo to rescue President Dwight D. Eisenhower from Yellow Claw. Woo first recruits Venus and Marvel Boy. He then tries to recruit Namora, who declines but tells Woo where to find a broken but potentially useful robot named M-11. While Marvel Boy fixes M-11, Woo asks Jann of the Jungle to take Marvel Boy to extend an invitation to Gorilla-Man, who accepts Woo's offer. The group quickly rescues Eisenhower and remains together for six months until the federal government, deciding the public is not ready for such a group, disbands the Agents of Atlas. Years later, Woo, by now a high-ranking agent of S.H.I.E.L.D., attempts a secret raid of a group identified as the Atlas Foundation. Going AWOL and taking several other willing agents with him, Woo invades an Atlas location, resulting in all of the recruits being killed. Woo himself is critically burned and loses his higher brain functions. Gorilla-Man, also a S.H.I.E.L.D. agent, gives the organization a record of the 1950s team, of which S.H.I.E.L.D. had no knowledge, and rescues Woo with the aid of M-11 and Marvel Boy. Namora, whom the group believed dead, is located by the Agents and joins the group. The team learns M-11 is a double agent for the Yellow Claw, and that Venus is a Sirens.

The New Agents of Atlas, art by Jung-Geun Yoon

During the War of the Realms event, Woo recruits his Protectors teammates Brawn, Shang-Chi, and Silk as the New Agents of Atlas before departing to defend Asia from Malekith's ally Queen Sindr and her Fire Goblin forces from Muspelheim. While the team is in Seoul, Woo is briefly incapacitated, forcing Brawn to assume leadership of the team. The Agents join forces with the White Fox, Crescent, Io, and Luna Snow against Sindr. When the agents are forced to retreat, Brawn summons Sword Master, Aero, Wave, and Pele to combat Sindr. With the assistance of Sun Wukong of the Ascendants, the New Agents of Atlas defeat Sindr and her army in Northern China, although Sun Wukong and "Pele" (who reveals herself to be M-41 Zu, a mystically enhanced android created by the Atlas Foundation) are killed in the process.

Following the War of the Realms, the New Agents of Atlas and Giant-Man are inadvertently summoned to Pan, a city of portals created by tech mogul Mike Nguyen linking major Asian and Pacific cities and enclaves into a single borderless metropolis. Despite the team's mistrust of Nguyen and the Protector of Pan, Issac Ikeda, a mercenary under Nguyen's employ, they decide to help protect Pan and its citizens after the city is attacked by wyverns and sea serpents and several Madripoorian refugees are harassed by Nguyen's Pan Guard.

Woo reveals to the team that for thousands of years, ancient dragons have served as advisors for human rulers. Dragons have used humans as proxies in their conflicts, making them responsible for almost every major war in history, including the conflict between Pan and Atlantis. Woo is content with this balance of power, but Nguyen suggests uniting the world under Pan, proposing to Namor and Woo that by harvesting the power of their dragons, they could overtake the rest of them. In a last ditch effort to destroy Atlantis, Nguyen places a Sirena tech implant on Brawn, transforming him into his original Hulk form and putting him under his control. Namor and the Agents stop Hulk's rampage by removing the implant, but the shockwaves generated during Hulk's fight with Namor have created a massive tsunami that heads towards the Heart of Pan. Namor and the Agents weaken the tsunami and save the city, although a repentant Nguyen dies while protecting civilians. One month later, Atlantis and the Sirenas sign a non-aggression pact, recognizing Pan as an independent nation. Upset for being treated as Woo's pawns, Shang-Chi and Brawn leave the team while Ikeda is recruited by Woo.

== Temple of Atlas ==
As part of a viral marketing strategy to promote the series, fans could participate in an alternate reality game centered around the "Temple of Atlas" weblog on Marvel's website. There, readers received weekly prose excerpts of the exploits of Jimmy Woo and his team, and were given "missions" from the Temple's curator, Mr. Lao. The goal was to discover each week's keyword by following textual clues Lao would post on the messageboards of such comic book webzines as Newsarama and Comic Book Resources. They, along with IGN.com and Comics Bulletin, would also feature fake news posts that players would be led toward, containing more clues for finding keywords. Anagrams were regular, and on several occasions one keyword had to be taken "into the field" by going to a local comic shop and saying the phrase to the staff in order to receive a keyword in response. On two occasions, players were required to attend a Heroes Convention and San Diego Comic-Con to find keywords.

== Other versions ==
In the Marvel Adventures: Avengers universe, a time travel story involved a 1958 version of the Agents of Atlas that found Captain America frozen in ice. The special was written by Jeff Parker and penciled by Leonard Kirk, same creative team as the Agents of Atlas miniseries.

== In other media ==
The Agents of Atlas appear in Lego Marvel Super Heroes 2 via a self-titled DLC, consisting of Gorilla-Man, Uranian, Venus, Jimmy Woo, and M-11.

== Collected editions ==
Title	Material collected	Published date	ISBN
Agents of Atlas	Agents of Atlas (vol. 1) #1-6, and material from Marvel Boy #1, Marvel Mystery Comics #82, Men's Adventures #26, Menace #11, Venus #1, What If? #9, Yellow Claw #1	May 2007	978-0-7851-2712-3
Agents of Atlas: Dark Reign	Agents of Atlas (vol. 2) #1–5, Wolverine: Agent of Atlas #1-3 and material from Dark Reign: New Nation	August 2009	978-0-7851-3898-3
Agents of Atlas: Turf Wars	Agents of Atlas (vol. 2) #6–11,	February 2010	978-0-7851-4276-8
Agents of Atlas vs.	X-Men vs. Agents of Atlas #1–2, Avengers vs. Atlas #1–4, Thunderbolts #138-140	July 2010	978-0-7851-4772-5
Atlas: Return of the Three Dimensional Man	Atlas #1–5 and material from The Incredible Hercules #138–141	December 2010	978-0-7851-4696-4
War of the Realms: New Agents of Atlas	War of The Realms: New Agents of Atlas #1-4	September 2019	978-1-302-91877-4
Agents of Atlas: Pandemonium	Agents of Atlas (vol. 3) #1-5	February 2020	978-1-302-92011-1
King in Black: Atlantis Attacks	Atlantis Attacks #1-5	July 2021	978-1-302-92456-0
Agents of Atlas: The Complete Collection Vol. 1	Agents Of Atlas (vol. 1) #1-6, X-Men: First Class #8, Wolverine: Agent Of Atlas #1-3, Agents Of Atlas (vol. 2) #1-5, What If? #9, Agents Of Atlas: Menace From Space and material from Spider-Man Family #4, Secret Invasion: Who Do You Trust?, Dark Reign: New Nation, Marvel Mystery Comics #82, Venus #1, Marvel Boy #1, Men's Adventures #26, Menace #11, Yellow Claw #1	May 2018	978-1-302-91129-4
Agents of Atlas: The Complete Collection Vol. 2	Agents of Atlas (vol. 2) #6-11, X-Men vs. Agents of Atlas #1-2, Avengers vs. Atlas #1-4, Thunderbolts #139-140 and material from Assault on New Olympus Prologue #1, The Incredible Hercules #138-141, Hercules: Fall of An Avenger #1-2	February 2020	978-1-302-92272-6
