= Aero (Marvel Comics) =

Marvel Comics superhero

- Lei Ling / Aero; Textless variant cover of Aero #1 (July 3, 2019). Art by Woo-Chul Lee

Publication information
- Publisher: Marvel Comics
- First appearance: Aero #1 (September 2018)
- Created by: Zhou Liefen (writer); Keng (artist)

In-story information
- Alter ego: Lei Ling
- Species: Inhuman
- Place of origin: Shanghai, China
- Team affiliations: Sacred Tree Design; Agents of Atlas; Tiger Division
- Partnerships: Wave
- Notable aliases: Aero
- Abilities: Ability to sense, generate, and manipulate air and wind granting: Generation of air constructs, clone, bubble, beams, and bomb; Generation of wind blade and burst; Power to cancel sounds; Superhuman senses; Flight; Chi manipulation

Aero (Lei Ling) is a superhero appearing in American comic books published by Marvel Comics. Created by writer Zhou Liefen and artist Keng, the character first appeared in Aero #1 (September 2018). Aero is a superhero of Chinese origin. She is an architect who possesses air-based superpowers linked to her Inhuman heritage.

== Development ==
=== Concept and creation ===
Aero is one of Marvel Comics's first Chinese superheroes. The publisher was developing comic books dealing with the character in 2017. The introduction of Aero was announced in 2018. Marvel revealed the latest progress on her comic books during an exhibition held in Shanghai in July 2018. She was created by Marvel Comics in collaboration with the Chinese company NetEase. Editor-in-chief C. B. Cebulski commented, "I love watching Marvel continue to expand globally, both in our fanbase and creative circles. Working to bring Aero and Sword Master to life was not about bringing Marvel characters to China, but about making China a bigger part of the Marvel Universe. And these Chinese characters are just the beginning." Lei Ling later made her English language debut outside China in 2019.

=== Publication history ===
==== 2010s ====
Lei Ling debuted in Aero #1 (2018), her first solo comic book series, created by writer Zhou Liefen and artist Keng. She later appeared in the 2019 War of the Realms: New Agents of Atlas series. She appeared in the 2019 Agents of Atlas series.

==== 2020s ====
Lei Ling appeared in the 2020 Atlantis Attacks series. She later appeared in the 2021 King in Black: Black Knight one-shot. She appeared in the 2021 The Marvels series.

== Fictional biography ==
As a child, Lei Ling dreams of flying every night and then one day, she discovered that she possessed air-based abilities, which lead her to become the superhero Aero. She later created her architecture firm, Sacred Tree Design, after being mentored as an agent by Madame Huang.

Aero traveled into the North Pacific after sensing a problem owing to her powers. She encountered the superhero Wave, who found a disturbance dealing with the water. Both were knocked by a whirlpool, which made Aero unconscious. Demons soon started to come out of the ocean.

When Shanghai was under attack, she realized that she was tricked to leave the city by demons, as it was left defenseless. The demons were later killed by a fire deity.

Lei Ling rescued the villagers living at the outer parts of the country of Sin-Cong. She attempted to save those trapped under a dark dome. She later fought the forces of Lady Lotus but was captured alongside other heroes. Together, they managed to escape to another universe. Lady Lotus was later stopped and brought to justice.

Aero eventually discovers her Inhuman heritage and joins forces with Iron Fist against his brother Lin Feng when Feng targets Attilan.

== Powers and abilities ==
As an Inhuman, Lei Ling has the ability to sense, generate, and manipulate air and wind at will. She can create a clone of herself made out of the air. Using her control over wind, she can fly and manifest whirlwinds and blades made of air.

== Reception ==
=== Critical response ===
George Marston of Newsarama referred to Lei Ling as a "breakout star." Theo Kogod of Comic Book Resources ranked Lei Ling 8th in their "10 Best-Dressed Marvel Characters of 2019" list, writing, "Aero has a stunning but practical superhero costume. The one-piece bodysuit is sleek and appears to be insulated against the cold of high altitude, while the sleeves hook onto her thumbs so they won't roll back as she's flying through the skies. But what really makes this costume work is her cape, which appears to be made from the very air she's manipulating."

=== Impact ===
In 2020, it was announced that Lei Ling "garnered millions of readers when her series initially launched in China." In May 2018, China Daily reported that Aero has had 6.64 million hits on the NetEase platform.

== Literary reception ==
=== Volumes ===
==== Aero (2019) ====
According to Diamond Comic Distributors, Aero Vol. 1 Before The Storm (TPB) was the 138th best selling graphic novel in February 2020.

===== Issue 1 =====
According to Diamond Comic Distributors, Aero #1 was the 12th best selling comic book in July 2019. It was the 120th best selling comic book in 2019.

Joe Grunenwald of Comics Beat asserted, "Overall Aero #1 does a nice job introducing English-reading audiences to two new international heroes they may not have met before. Pak presents a pair of entertaining stories, and the art on both tales fits the flavor of each piece well. If you’re in the market for some superheroes who don’t look like most other superhero out there, this book should leave you satisfied." Josh Davison of Comicon.com gave Aero #1 a grade of 8 out of 10, writing, "Aero #1 is an exciting first issue for this new Marvel superhero. Lei Ling is an interesting, fun, and compelling lead character, and the threats she faces in this issue make for great conflict. This one gets a recommendation for sure. Check it out."

==== Issue 2 ====
According to Diamond Comic Distributors, Aero #2 was the 122nd best selling comic book in August 2019.

Matthew Aguilar of ComicBook.com gave Aero #2 a grade of 4 out of 5 stars, saying, "Aero showed promise with its first issue, but the second issue delivers far more than just promise. The book kicks off with absolutely stunning visuals from Keng and a story by Zhou Liefen and Greg Pak that starts to pull back the layers to both Aero's personality and her impressive power set. Her nemesis is quite compelling too, and their battle hints at even bigger things to come. After that Pak, artist Pop Mhan, and colorist Federico Blee are up to bat, and while the visuals aren't quite as strong here, they do fit the type of story Pak is trying to tell. This story's much more focused on Wave, but in just a few pages you end up with a much more well rounded picture of who she is, what she's been through, and the heart of gold underneath all the pain. It might have started out a little slow, but here Aero is truly starting to hit its stride, and we're quickly becoming big fans of the hero and her amazing world." Josh Davison of Comicon.com gave Aero #2 a grade of 8 out of 10, stating, "Aero #2 is another exciting and grabbing issue for this fledgling Marvel hero. Lei Ling is an interesting and unique lead in the Marvel canon, and I look forward to seeing how she grows and develops over time. I’d also like to see her encounter some of the Marvel Universe staples somewhere down the line. In any case, this comic gets a recommendation. Check it out."

== Other versions ==
An alternate version of Lei Ling / Aero appears in Marvel Zombies. She was infected and turned into a zombie who is attacking people.

== In other media ==
- Lei Ling / Aero appears as a playable character in Marvel: Future Fight.
- Lei Ling / Aero appears as a playable card in Marvel Snap.
