= Luna Snow =

Marvel Comics superhero

- Marvel Comics character
- Luna Snow from Marvel Rivals
- First appearance: Marvel Future Fight (2018)
- First comic: War of the Realms: New Agents of Atlas #1 (2019)
- Created by: Bill Rosemann and Danny Koo
- Designed by: Jee-Hyung Lee
- Voiced by: Victoria Grace (Marvel Super War); Judy Alice Lee (Marvel Rivals) Song vocals: Hyungseo ("Tonight", "I Really Wanna"); MinMin ("Flow"); Luna ("Fly Away", "Flow" (remix), "Flight Mode"); Jieun ("I Really Wanna Fly Away")

In-universe information
- Origin: Seoul, South Korea
- Nationality: Korean

Luna Snow (Korean: 루나 스노우), also known as Seol Hee (설희), is a fictional K-pop idol and superheroine appearing in media produced by American comic book publisher Marvel Comics. The character was introduced in Korean developer Netmarble's mobile game Marvel Future Fight in 2018, and made her comic book debut in War of the Realms: New Agents of Atlas #1 in 2019. The character was created by Bill Rosemann and Danny Koo of Marvel Games and designed by Jee-Hyung Lee of Netmarble. In video games, she has been voiced by Victoria Grace and Judy Alice Lee.

Snow is a member of the superhero team the Agents of Atlas who possesses ice-based superpowers. She has appeared in other media, including promotional singles and music videos attributed to the character. She has been well received since her debut, regarding both her characterization and the efforts to represent and appeal to Korean comic book readers. Despite this praise, she was not seen as mainstream until her introduction in the hero shooter game Marvel Rivals, debuting with the game when it was released in December 2024.

== Conception and development ==
When developing an update for the mobile game Marvel Future Fight, South Korean mobile game developer Netmarble requested a character described as an "ice magician who could both heal and deal damage" for the game. Marvel Games senior producer Danny Koo was receptive to the idea after the success of the introduction of the character Sharon Rogers to the game, while game director Bill Rosemann saw it as an opportunity to create a new character for that could please both the development team and fans. The pair worked with development director Min-Kyun Kim to draw up early concepts of the character Luna Snow.

Rosenmann aimed to create a culturally resonant character, using her Korean identity to provide meaningful representation for Asian fans. While both he and Koo considered several careers and origins, they settled on the idea of a K-Pop singer taking care of her grandmother because they felt that would resonate with the audience, but also due to the popularity of K-Pop at the time. Koo particularly liked the concept of an established musician having to juggle a superhero identity. She was given the civilian identity of "Seol Hee", as the name translates to "Snow" and "Hope". Koo saw Luna as a representation of a new generation of heroes, while the development team saw her inclusion as a way to also revitalize Future Fight as a title.

Koo wrote the basic fundamentals of Luna's character design, while art director Jee-Hyung Lee handled the work directly. As no other characters in the game had ice powers, they refined the concept and chose to give her "the power of both White and Dark Ice" where one set could heal, while the other would be destructive. This duality was intended to forge a hero who balances her abilities between each hand, mirroring the equilibrium she maintains across all aspects of her life. They also designed her abilities to reflect her identity as a pop idol, including the ability to subdue enemies with her charisma.

=== Design ===
Luna Snow is a tall, slender Asian woman standing 170 centimetres (5 ft 7 in) tall. Her hair is black on the right side and white on the other, worn in a bob cut hairstyle. She has heterochromia, resulting in her eyes being two different colors. All the base design aspects and design details were overseen by Lee, who used themes of snow and the moon inspired by K-Pop. Her emblem is a half-moon crest, meant to resemble the ice symbol on her jacket, belt buckle and necklace. Meanwhile, her icicle earrings and heterochromia were meant to reference K-Pop culture directly, while her eyes and dual-colored hair were also meant to symbolize her duality.

Her outfits in Future Fight were designed to reflect two different styles: casual and starlight. The casual outfit consists of an armor-plated dark teal jumpsuit with metal bands that traverse the front of her chest, while a necklace dangles around her neck over its collar, and a snowflake and crescent moon adorn her left and right hips respectively on the armor. Meanwhile, the starlight outfit consists of a dark teal and white tube top that exposes her abdomen, a black jacket with belts around the right arm, a black glove on her right arm while the left is exposed, except for a separated white sleeve, and white hot pants with a black trim. She has thigh-high stockings that alternate in black and white, and a white belt around her waist. On her belt is a black crescent moon next to a white snowflake overlayed on a similar pairing on her necklace, as well as the back of her jacket.

When she was later introduced in the game Marvel Rivals by Chinese developer NetEase, her starlight outfit was used as her primary design. It remained relatively unchanged, except for changing the teal to blue, and the addition of a blue coloration to the belts around her arms. Her leggings were transformed into black leather boots, accented with dark blue highlights that extended to a similar length.

== Appearances ==
Seol Hee is a South Korean superhero introduced in a 2018 update for Marvel Future Fight. An aspiring singer from Seoul, she aimed to support her family financially, eventually pursuing a career as a K-Pop idol. During a live performance, she was taken hostage by the supervillain organization Advanced Idea Mechanics (A.I.M.), after she tried to protect the attendees of the event. After being trapped in a malfunctioning cold fusion reactor, she acquired ice-based superpowers and subsequently defeated the A.I.M. forces, adopting the superhero identity and stage name Luna Snow.

Since her introduction, she has gone on to appear in several other video games, including the multiplayer online battle arena game Marvel Super War and hero shooter game Marvel Rivals. As part of a crossover with Rivals and other titles, she later appeared in the mobile trading card game Marvel Snap and the puzzle video game Marvel Puzzle Quest. In Super War, she is voiced by Victoria Grace, while in Rivals she is voiced by Judy Alice Lee. In 2026, a skin cosmetic item based on her appearance in Future Fight was released for Fortnite, a battle royale game developed by Epic Games. In other media, Luna Snow makes a cameo in the Your Friendly Neighborhood Spider-Man animated series.

=== In comic books ===
Luna Snow made her comic book debut in Marvel's War of the Realms: New Agents of Atlas #1, a tie-in comic to Marvel's broader "War of the Realms" event released in May 2019. She fights alongside White Fox and Crescent as they defend South Korea from invading Fire Goblins from Muspelheim. After mistaking the hero Brawn for one of these monsters, they join forces with him and the Agents of Atlas to drive Queen Sindr and her forces out of Asia, and are later recruited into the team. Later that year, she appeared in Future Fight Firsts: Luna Snow #1, which detailed the character's origin story. She has also appeared in other Marvel comics, including the 2020 Atlantis Attacks series, the 2022 Silk series, the 2022 Marvel's Voices: Identity anthology series, the 2022 Tiger Division series, and the 2025 one-shot comic Concert of Champions, where she helped fellow musicians Dazzler, Ghost-Spider and Lila Cheney thwart the heavy metal band Deep Void.

In 2025, Luna appeared in the limited series Doom's Division, which was part of the One World Under Doom storyline, in which Tiger Division is forced to serve under Doctor Doom as Doom's Division while Luna is ordered to record pro-Doom propaganda music. The team eventually turns against him and despite his defeat, Luna's association with his regime damages her reputation and leaves her ostracized by the general public and dismissed by her record label. She seeks atonement in the 2026 one-shot Luna Snow: World Tour, coming into conflict with a rival K-pop idol named Vibe. Upon discovering Vibe can enthrall listeners with her music, Luna recruits Sunfire, Wave and Rick Jones to confront her. Vibe's manager is revealed to be Starfox, who was using Vibe's music to spread his seduction powers and offers to help Luna salvage her reputation. Luna refuses and defeats him with Vibe's help and takes her former rival under her wing.

Luna is also the protagonist in the one-shot comic Marvel Rivals: Cities of Heaven, a 2026 tie-in to the game and part of Marvel's "Infinity Comics" line in which she tries to secure a singing job at a mystical club in K'un-L'un. Along the way, she encounters various other heroes from the game, resulting in several detours, such as engaging in a drinking contest with Wolverine.

== Promotion and reception ==
Luna Snow's design in Marvel Rivals sparked discussion regarding the sexualization of the character.

To promote Marvel Rivals at the 2025 San Diego Comic Con, NetEase showcased a gameplay music video of Luna Snow. Several music tracks were released with various musicians performing as the character. These tracks include "Tonight" and "I Really Wanna" by Hyungseo, "Flow" by MinMin, and "Fly Away", "Flight Mode", and a remix of "Flow" by Luna of the band f(x). In 2023, two of the previously released tracks were combined into one single titled "I Really Wanna Fly Away", this time performed by singer Jieun. Several figures of the character based on her Marvel Rivals appearance have also been released by companies such as Funko as part of their Funko Pop figurine line, Hasbro as part of the Marvel Legends toyline, and Hot Toys.

George Yang of Polygon praised Luna for embodying Marvel's more active engagement with Asian characters, particularly within the K-Pop demographic, noting that her inclusion in games like Marvel Rivals underscores the company's commitment to representation. He felt that with the growing fandom around K-Pop and its use in similar titles such as Le Sserafim's collaboration with the game Overwatch 2, it was a logical step to introduce such a character, and that her presence in Rivals was partially intended to appeal to Korean gamers and comic book readers. He further expressed that the inclusion of diverse characters like Luna helped expand the game's audience and "create[d] a much richer and interesting universe".

Regarding her comic book appearances, David Brooke of AIPT described her introductory comic as a "classic case of an accident creating a hero", though felt her characterization and location helped provide a unique angle to the event. Although, he felt that she was underutilized in the comic until she gained her powers, and he partly blamed it on the story's reliance on secondary characters. Despite his criticism, he enjoyed how her powers were illustrated, expressing that Luna was a character he wanted to see in the Marvel Cinematic Universe. He felt that there was a lot in her origin story that would get fans excited. He also compared her to Elsa from the Disney film Frozen.

Luna has been used as an example in criticisms of Rivals about how it sexualizes its female characters. Nico Parungo of Gfinity eSports was surprised at Luna's summer skin for Rivals, stating that while her base design in the game was already revealing, a "one-piece bathing suit takes things to the next level". He felt the developers were aware of this, as highlight reels particularly emphasized her figure in the new skin. While he stated this was not a bad thing necessarily, he found it amusing to see coming from a billion-dollar franchise like Marvel Comics. He added that while the game did slant towards the sexualization of its characters in the eyes of some, this particular design was not out of line with how some character costumes were shown in the comics themselves.

Additional coverage on the character focused on her increased visibility following her appearance in Rivals. Madelyn Champa of Screen Rant stated that while Luna had a long-running presence in the comics, the character had not seen mainstream success until the game. Describing her as its breakout star, Champa felt it not only helped expose her to a much larger audience but gave her "the popularity she's long deserved" and helped with her comeback in mainstream comics, which referenced her outfits in Rivals. She additionally praised her Mirae 2099 skin design and its use in the comics, describing it as not only referencing the Marvel 2099 comic line but also her role as a K-Pop idol due to the large headphones and pink color scheme, while the long pigtails echoed the look of vocaloid character Hatsune Miku.
