= Marvel Boy (Robert Grayson) =

Fictional superhero in Marvel Comics

Robert Grayson
- Agents of Atlas #3. Cover art by Tomm Coker

Publication information
- Publisher: Marvel Comics
- First appearance: Marvel Boy #1 (Dec. 1950)
- Created by: Stan Lee; Russ Heath

In-story information
- Team affiliations: Agents of Atlas
- Notable aliases: The Crusader, the Uranian, Blue Marvel
- Abilities: Telepathy; Light blasts Superhuman strength, stamina, and durability Accomplished athlete Expert pilot

Marvel Boy (Robert Grayson), also known as The Uranian, is a superhero appearing in American comic books published by Marvel Comics. The character is one of several to use the name "Marvel Boy". He was created by writer-editor Stan Lee and artist Russ Heath, and first appeared in Marvel Boy #1 (Dec. 1950).

== Publication history ==
Robert Grayson is the 1950s Marvel Boy, created by Stan Lee and Russ Heath in Marvel Boy #1 (Dec. 1950), from Marvel 1950s forerunner, Atlas Comics. Writer-artist Bill Everett took over with issue #2. Marvel Boy continued to star when the series title changed to Astonishing with issue #3, but was gradually de-emphasized. The character's final Atlas story was in Astonishing #7 (Dec. 1951).

Grayson would not appear again until What If #9 (June 1978). This version of Marvel Boy was revived within mainstream Marvel continuity, in a 1950s setting, with the six-issue Agents of Atlas (2006).

== Fictional character biography ==
Robert Grayson was born in Trenton, New Jersey, the son of a Jewish scientist, Dr. Horace Grabshield (later Anglicized as Grayson). Grayson fled Earth with Robert during the rise of Nazi Germany, when Robert was an infant. The Graysons arrived on Uranus, where they were greeted by the native Uranian Eternals.

=== Original persona ===
When he grew older, Robert was given a costume and a pair of powerful energy-band bracelets, and returned to Earth in the 1950s to battle crime. He battled such foes as the Great Video.

=== The Crusader ===
Robert Grayson purportedly returned much later as an antagonist and vigilante, having been revived from suspended animation. He was apparently driven insane by grief over the death of the Uranian colony and called himself The Crusader. (Note: This character and name has no relation to the Crusader, a medieval character in Atlas Comics' The Black Knight.) He attempted to murder banker Calvin McClary and battled the Fantastic Four. When the Crusader lost control of the energies channeled through his power wrist-bracelets, referred to as Quantum Bands, they overloaded, and he was vaporized. His ghost later appeared in the pages of Quasar as the Blue Marvel.

=== As part of Agents of Atlas ===
The 2006 Marvel miniseries Agents of Atlas retconned the Crusader's existence by claiming that he had actually not been Robert Grayson, but instead was a confused and surgically altered Uranian Eternal who had been given the Quantum Bands as an equivalent to Marvel Boy's power bracelets. This individual was intended as an unquestioningly loyal servant of the Uranian Eternals, conditioned to obey them and to believe he was actually the original Marvel Boy. However, the plan went awry when a disaster destroyed his creators midway through the project, leaving the Crusader in a deranged and delusional state.

== Powers and abilities ==
Atlas Comics' Marvel Boy #1 (Dec. 1950): Cover artist uncertain; possibly Sol Brodsky.

During his career, Marvel Boy utilized two different pairs of wristbands. Both manipulated gravity and light; the second pair was stronger than the first. He wore polarized contact lenses which protected him when he manipulated light, creating blinding bursts to incapacitate his opponents. By manipulating gravity, he was able to fly. The bands provided these abilities by absorbing and transforming solar radiation. Through them, Marvel Boy gained superhuman strength, stamina, and durability. He also used a rocket ship designed by his father, Horace Grayson, based on designs by Uranian technicians.

The Uranians gave Marvel Boy a headband which became his primary weapon. This headband consists of highly sophisticated technologies that not only allow him to control his spaceship remotely, but also affords him a high degree of telepathic ability. He can read minds, project highly convincing images and commands into the brains of others, and can scan the physiological state of those around him.

Marvel Boy's body has been altered to share, on some level, a Uranian physiology. The full extent of this remains unrevealed, although it is known that he must breathe an atmosphere akin to the planet Uranus' and that, in order to eat, he must distend his esophagus. These are not characteristics of an actual Uranian Eternal (Note: See Eternals.) and were not seen before the Agents of Atlas series.

An elite athlete and pilot, Grayson holds an advanced degree in science and technology from the Uranian Academy. His training grants him technical knowledge superior to contemporary Earth discoveries.

== Other versions ==
The manipulative mastermind Thanos created a duplicate of Marvel Boy via the Infinity Gauntlet; this double was later renamed the Blue Marvel and attempted to become the Punisher's sidekick but was rejected and was later exiled to a limbo dimension.

The parallel universe anthology What If #9 (June 1978) showed a world where Marvel Boy was a member of a team of 1950s "Avengers." This team battled the Yellow Claw and his superhuman minions, though the team was asked to disband by US President Dwight D. Eisenhower. This alternate timeline was destroyed in the 1998–2000 limited series Avengers Forever.
