= Marvel: Future Fight =

2015 superhero themed video game

- Loading screen for the game after the Captain America: Civil War update
- Developer: Netmarble Monster
- Publisher: Netmarble
- Engine: Unity
- Platforms: iOS, Android
- Release: WW: April 30, 2015
- Genres: Action role-playing, dungeon crawler
- Modes: Single-player, multiplayer

Marvel: Future Fight (Korean: Marvel 퓨처파이트) is a 2015 action role-playing game developed and published by Netmarble.

== Gameplay ==
Players assemble a team of iconic Marvel heroes and villains to engage in battles. The gameplay revolves around completing missions and quests across various storylines, battling against waves of enemies in real-time combat. Players can control their characters' movements and unleash attacks using touch controls. The game features a roster of over 274 Marvel characters, each with unique abilities and skills that can be upgraded and customized. Additionally, players can join alliances, participate in PvP battles, and compete in special events to earn rewards and strengthen their team.

In subsequent updates, Marvel Comics worked with NetMarble to develop several original characters for the game, including an alternate version of Captain America named Sharon Rogers, Luna Snow, and the duo Crescent and Io.

== Plot ==
The collapse of several dimensions prompts investigations from Thor, Black Bolt, and Black Panther. After battling alternative versions of themselves, they inform Nick Fury. Meanwhile, Captain America, Black Widow, and Iron Man defend Stark Tower from an attack by Ultron. In the attack, it is revealed that Stark Industries employee Jemma Simmons is kidnapped by Advanced Idea Mechanics (AIM). After she is saved, the heroes encounter alternative versions of many heroes and villains on a search for MODOK. They conclude A.I.M. has built a device to send people between dimensions.

MODOK is defeated and reveals he was researching Ultron by summoning his dimensional alternates before Red Skull stole the dimension transporter. After this event, S.H.I.E.L.D. agents begin to be attacked by thugs with advanced weaponry. The group of heroes fight them off and chase after Red Skull and Hydra, who is defeated alongside Ultron. An interdimensional transference device opens between time, and the future versions of themselves appear. They too are defeated, and a dimensional split occurs. After that heroes defeat Inhumans and Loki and proceed on to meet Dr. Simmons.

Doctor Strange explains that he and Jemma Simmons have homed in on an energy signal similar to the convergence device lost in the battle against Ultron. The team believes that it is the Ultimates working to solve the problem of the dimensions collapsing. When they arrive at the Ultimates HQ - The Triskelion, they are confronted by the defense systems drones and a skeptical Black Panther who believes they are from another dimension. After overpowering Black Panther and assuring him of their identity they proceed on to meet Blue Marvel who is working on the device to seal the dimension rifts. Suddenly they realize that the Triskelion has gone in full lockdown. Anti-Man and another dangerous inmate, detained by the Ultimates had escaped containment. At this point the team is curious to know who the other inmate is, demanding answers they find it is Thanos, the Mad Titan. With the help of Jemma Simmons, the team comes up with a means to track Thanos's chronal signature.

With the addition of Carol Danvers, heroes pursue Thanos, but they are greeted by Anti-Man. Hearing Thanos's false promises to Anti-Man for a better future, Tony and Adam Brashear are able to piece together Thanos' true intentions. In order to please Death, he intends to use the convergence device to open a rift to the future and destroy reality using the unstable Anti-Man. The heroes are able to defeat and reason with Anti-Man, bringing him back under control. They then proceed to stop Thanos from opening the rift. A battle ensues and as they are about to beat Thanos, he manages to slip through the rift into an unknown point in the future. The team is forced to follow to stop Thanos from destroying the future.

== Development and release ==
Marvel: Future Fight was developed by Netmarble Games, creators of titles such as Star Wars: Force Arena, Seven Knights, Raven (Evilbane in the U.S.) and Everybody's Marble. Marvel worked closely with Netmarble to establish the various character backgrounds, appearances and traits. The storyline for the game was penned by best-selling Marvel comics writer Peter David.

Marvel: Future Fight was released on April 30, 2015, for iOS and Android.

== Reception ==
Reception

Aggregate score
Aggregator	Score
Metacritic	79/100

Review score
Publication	Score
Gamezebo	4/5

Marvel: Future Fight surpassed 50 million downloads two years after it first launched. 20 million of these downloads came from Asia, 10 million from North America and Europe, 6 million from South America and 2.9 million in the Middle East.

As of April 2025, the game had over 150 million players.

ThisIsGame rated it 7 out of 10, praising a faithful adaptation of the Marvel Comics characters but criticizing gacha game mechanics and PvP balancing.

== Legacy ==
Marvel: Future Fight introduced original Marvel Comics character for its gameplay, Luna Snow and Crescent. Luna made her comic debut in Marvel's "The War of the Realms" storyline, first appearing in War of the Realms: New Agents of Atlas #1 in May 2019. She was included in the hero shooter game Marvel Rivals.
