= Father Time (Marvel Comics) =

Marvel Comics superhero

- Father Time as depicted in Captain America Comics #6; art by Al Avison and Al Gabriele.

Publication information
- Publisher: Marvel Comics
- First appearance: Captain America Comics #6 (Sept. 1941)
- Created by: Stan Lee; Al Avison

In-story information
- Alter ego: Larry Scott
- Species: Human
- Team affiliations: Crazy S.U.E.S
- Notable aliases: Larry Scott
- Abilities: None

Father Time (Larry Scott) is a superhero appearing in American comic books published by Marvel Comics. The character was created by writer Stan Lee and artist Al Avison and first appeared in Captain America Comics #6 (Sept. 1941), published by Marvel predecessor Timely Comics during the period fans and historians call the Golden Age of comic books. He was one of the many costumed operatives who were recruited into the United States military.

Like many heroes recruited in this fashion, Father Time's fictional exploits were few. For most of these early heroes it was due to their deaths in combat, but Father Time was not depicted as suffering this fate.

== Publication history ==
In addition to his appearances in Captain America issues #6-12, he also appeared in Mystic Comics #10 and Young Allies #3. In 2011, he appeared again in All-Winners Squad: Band of Heroes as a member of the war time team Crazy Sues.

A different, non-superhero Father Time appeared as a character in the Blonde Phantom story "Doomed for Death" in Blonde Phantom Comics #22 (March 1949).

Hawkeye (Clint Barton), the superhero archer of the team the Avengers, disguised himself as an unrelated character named Father Time in the 50th-anniversary issue Captain America #383 (March 1991). Another unrelated character of the same name appears in DC Comics.

== Fictional character biography ==
=== 1940s ===
Larry Scott's father John became framed for homicide and was sentenced to be electrocuted in the electric chair. Learning that crook Chips Brant was the one behind his father's framing, Larry tried to pressure the crook to confess. Knocked out for his trouble, Larry recovered and tried to carry new proof that might clean his father's name. Unfortunately, Larry arrived too late and his father was executed just moments before his name could be cleared. Wishing that time could be on the side of law and the innocent victims of crime, Larry decided to become a crime fighter. Donning a hooded cloak and wielding a scythe, Larry takes on the name Father Time and seeks to make time work against criminals, rather than the innocent. He captured Chips Brant before he could skip town and became a champion against evil.

Shortly after his first adventure, Larry found out that his pal Hal Sakson was accused of murdering the group of the Southern Princess to be able to loot the salvaged deliver of gold that they had uncovered recently. As Father Time, Larry exposed the crooked District Attorney as the one responsible by using the superstitions of his hired thugs to frighten them into a confession.

=== Crazy S.U.E.S ===
Father Time was one of the many costumed heroes drafted into the military following the United States entry into World War II. He was assigned to the Crazy S.U.E.S., under the command of Captain America. His involvement with the squad is unrecorded, however, he is one of the few members to survive, as he was one of the many heroes gathered by Captain America (William Nasland) to invade Berlin in 1945.

== Legacy ==
Although not one of the most popular heroes of his time, Father Time maintained some notoriety. In the modern age during a celebration of the birth of Steve Rogers as Captain America, his fellow Avenger Hawkeye dressed as Father Time.
