= Destroyer (Marvel Comics) =

Marvel Comics superhero

The Destroyer
- Al Gabriele's cover to Mystic Comics #8 (March 1942)

Publication information
- Publisher: Marvel Comics
- First appearance: Marlow: Mystic Comics #6 (October 1941); Falsworth: The Invaders #18 (July 1977); Aubrey: The Invaders #14 (March 1977)
- Created by: Marlow: Stan Lee (writer) Jack Binder Alex Schomburg; Falsworth & Aubrey: Roy Thomas (writer) Frank Robbins (artist)

In-story information
- Alter ego: Kevin "Keen" Marlow; Brian Falsworth; Roger Aubrey
- Abilities: Peak human physical condition; Skilled fighter and marksman; Aubrey: Size reduction; Super-Soldier Formula enhanced physical abilities

The Destroyer is the name of three superheroes appearing in American comic books published by Marvel Comics. The original incarnation was created by writer Stan Lee and artist Jack Binder and first appeared in Mystic Comics #6 (October 1941), being one of Lee's earliest creations during the Golden Age of Comic Books.

Subsequent incarnations created by Roy Thomas and Frank Robbins appeared in The Invaders #18 (July 1977), and The Invaders #26 (March 1978). The Official Handbook of the Marvel Universe clarifies that all three versions of the character are considered canon.

== Publication history ==
=== Golden Age publications ===
The Destroyer first appeared as the cover subject and in a story in Mystic Comics #6 (Oct. 1941), from Marvel Comics' predecessor Timely Comics. One of the World War II-era heroes of what fans and historians call the Golden Age of Comic Books, the character was one of the first co-created by Marvel writer-editor Stan Lee. The artist co-creator is uncertain: the story penciler-inker was Jack Binder, but the cover artist, who may have drawn the character first, was Alex Schomburg.

In 1997, comics historian and former Marvel editor-in-chief Roy Thomas wrote that "Stan's most popular superhero creation before the Fantastic Four was the Destroyer." However, a 2019 book by Thomas and Kurt Mitchell described the Destroyer as "a Stan Lee-written mash-up of Captain America's origin and Blazing Skull's setting notable largely for its hero's eerie grey-and-red costume."

According to Jess Nevins' Encyclopedia of Golden Age Superheroes, "He fights a variety of villains, from ordinary Axis agents to Dr. Dragon to Satan and Madam Satan to the Japanese villain the Face."

The Destroyer ran as the cover feature of Mystic #6 and of the remaining four issues of that 10-issue superhero anthology, and while less popular than the company's Captain America, the Human Torch, and the Sub-Mariner, he went on to star in issues of nearly every Timely superhero comic-book series — becoming the company's most-published character outside of those three stars and the Angel.

The Destroyer stood out from other wartime heroes in that he operated solely within occupied Europe. Artists associated with the feature include pencilers Al Gabriele and Mike Sekowsky, and inkers Vince Alascia and Allen Bellman. Comic-book giant Jack Kirby contributed the Destroyer cover of Mystic Comics #7 (Dec. 1941). The cover was inked by either Syd Shores or Joe Simon (sources differ).

The character's Golden Age appearances included:

- Mystic Comics #6-10 (1941-1942)
- All Winners Comics #2-12 (1941-1944)
- USA Comics #6, 8–14, 16-17 (1942-1945)
- Amazing Comics #1 (1944)
- Complete Comics #2 (1944)
- Mystic Comics vol. 2 #1–4 (1944–1945)
- Kid Comics #4–6, 9–10 (1944–1946)
- Daring Mystery Comics #11 (1945)
- Daring Comics #12 (1945)
- All Select Comics #6, 10 (1945–1946)

=== 1970s publications ===
Roy Thomas and Frank Robbins first featured Roger Aubrey as the diminutive Dyna-Mite in The Invaders #14–15 (March–April 1977); in the story he is part of the predominantly British superhero group the Crusaders, who are being manipulated by the Nazis into killing the British King. He returns in Thomas and Robbins' Invaders #18–21 (July–Oct. 1977); in the story he parachutes into Nazi Germany with Lord Falsworth and Spitfire on a mission to restore his memory; a flashback reveals that he and his best friend Brian Falsworth had gone to Berlin on a peace mission which ended with them in a Nazi prison where he was experimented on.

Thomas and Robbins also featured the Falsworth incarnation of the Destroyer in The Invaders #18–19 (July–Aug. 1977); in the story he explains how he received a variation of the super-soldier formula from a fellow inmate of a Nazi prison; the previous incarnation as Marlow is retconed as a mistaken FBI theory popularized in comic books. Thomas and Robbins concluded the plot-line in The Invaders #20–21 (Sept.–Oct. 1977); in the story he abandons his role as the Destroyer and takes over his father's role of Union Jack to rescue his sister and the rest of the team while Aubrey helps to steal a plane to get them home, and in The Invaders #22 (Nov. 1977); in which they are both safely returned to England. Thomas and Robbins also featured Falsworth as Union Jack in What If? #4 (Aug. 1977); in the story he and Spitfire save Winston Churchill from a Nazi assassination attempt.

Thomas and Robbins continued to feature Falsworth and Aubrey in the series, with the former becoming a semi-permanent member of the team in his new role as Union Jack with issues #23 (Dec. 1977) & #25 (Feb. 1978); in which he joins them on his first mission, while the latter appeared in a supporting role as Dyna-Mite in issue #23 (December 1977); in which he searches for a cure for the Nazi experimentation that has reduced his size, and #26 (March 1978); in which a restored Aubrey is introduced in his role as the new Destroyer. This incarnation was also featured by Thomas, Donald Glut and Alan Kupperberg in The Invaders #34 (Nov. 1978) and by Glut, Kupperberg and Charles Eber Stone in The Invaders #41 (Sept. 1979).

=== 1980s publications ===
Roger Stern and John Byrne mentioned Falsworth in the backstory for Captain America #253–254 (January–February 1981); the story reveals in a flashback that he died in a car crash in 1953.

=== 1990s publications ===
Dan Slott and James W. Fry III featured Aubrey in the World War II-era story Enis Nacht for Marvel Comics Presents #156 (June 1994); in the story he guides a British bomber to its Nazi target. Slott and Fry featured him in another World War II-era story for Midnight Sons Unlimited #9 (May 1995); in the story he helps the Blazing Skull to infiltrate a Nazi base.

=== 2000s publications ===
Aubrey appears as a supporting character in Fabian Nicieza and Lewis LaRosa's Citizen V and the V-Battalion: The Everlasting #1 (March 2002). The story begins with a flashback showing him at Falsworth's funeral in 1953.

Allan Jacobsen and C.P. Smith used Aubrey as a supporting character in a number of issues of New Invaders, including #2 (Nov. 2004), in which he is claimed to be one of the new team's first recruits, #4–5 (January–February 2005), which sees him battling the vampiric Baroness Blood alongside Union Jack, and #9 (June 2005), which sees him resuming command of V-Battalion following the death of the original Human Torch.

In Captain America: Sentinel of Liberty (Vol 2) #10 (May 2023), by writers Jackson Lanzing and Collin Kelly and artist Carmen Carnero, Aubrey's lifetime experiences of overcoming adversity enable him to play a central role in breaking M.O.D.O.C.'s control over the minds of the Invaders. He ultimately sacrifices his life to save Sharon Carter when he takes the brunt of the villain's directed energy weapon, a beam from which had been intended for Carter.

In "Nothing but a Fight", a follow-up story by the same creators that appears in the anthology issue Captain America #750 (September 2023), Aubrey's peers eulogize him at his funeral. He is laid to rest beside Falsworth beneath a headstone whose epitaph reads, "Roger Aubrey: A Man of Love and Destroyer of Hate".

== Fictional character biographies ==
=== Keen Marlow ===
American journalist Keen Marlow is captured for spying while reporting behind-the-lines in Nazi Germany. While imprisoned in a concentration camp, Marlow is given a super-soldier serum, similar to that given to Captain America, by fellow prisoner Professor Eric Schmitt, a German anti-Nazi scientist. Responding to the chemical (and without the beneficial "Vita-Rays" used to chemically stabilize Captain America's serum), Marlow becomes a prime human specimen who escapes, dons a sleek, dark costume with a skull motif and a skintight blue mask that made him appear inhuman, and adopts a fearsome identity with which he fights the Nazis on their own turf. He was occasionally abetted by an Allied agent named Florence von Banger. Antagonists included the Scar, Herr Sin and Von Maus.

=== Brian Falsworth ===
In the Destroyer's retconned appearances in the 1970s, his origin is attributed to Brian Falsworth, brother of Invaders member Spitfire and son of James Montgomery Falsworth / Union Jack.

=== Roger Aubrey ===
Brian Falsworth gave up the Destroyer identity to become the new Union Jack, and his friend Roger Aubrey (initially introduced as the superhero Dyna-Mite, a member of the team the Crusaders) became the new Destroyer. Falsworth's story is recounted in passing in Ed Brubaker's 2009–2010 miniseries The Marvels Project as part of the Angel's diary of the war. This retelling claims that "Keen Marlow" was an alias used by Falsworth to enter Germany to spy; he was betrayed and captured, and then empowered well after Captain America. However, prior established continuity showed that Falsworth entered Germany under his real name pre-war to promote appeasement, that he was captured trying to leave Germany shortly after Poland was invaded, and empowered only days later, more than a year before Steve Rogers became Captain America. It was later revealed that Brian and Roger were lovers.

== Other versions ==
Versions of the Destroyer, both in continuity and out, have appeared in various Marvel comics. The Age of the Sentry #5 (March 2009) depicts the character as a member of the Guardians of the Galaxy. The character also made a guest appearance in a 2000s issue of New Invaders.

=== MAX imprint ===
Marvel's MAX imprint published the five-issue miniseries The Destroyer vol. 4 (June–Oct. 2009). Written by Robert Kirkman and drawn by Cory Walker, it starred a version of the character Keene Marlow depicted, according to Kirkman, under "the assumption that he's had an ongoing series since the '40s, so I'm basically writing 'issues #701-#705' ..." In this series, a still-active but elderly Marlowe discovers he has a limited amount of time before he will suffer a fatal heart attack, and sets out to kill his old enemies and anyone else who might threaten his wife Harriet, who is black and has a bionic arm, or their grown daughter Felecia.

Keene Marlow (his first name slightly different from the earlier comics' "Keen") is enhanced by a super-soldier serum variant, similar to the one used to create Captain America (Steve Rogers), but lacking the Vita-Ray treatment. His former sidekick Turret (Darius Mitchell) is married to Felecia and takes over the role of the Destroyer when Marlow retires.

== In other media ==
=== Television ===
The Keen Marlow incarnation of the Destroyer, renamed Keene Marlowe, appears in the Spider-Man: The Animated Series five-part episode "Six Forgotten Warriors", voiced by Roy Dotrice. This version is an old colleague of Captain America and friend of Ben Parker who, along with the Whizzer, Miss America, the Black Marvel, and the Thunderer, obtained his powers from a flawed attempt at recreating the process that empowered Captain America during World War II and has to regulate them with a special ring.

=== Video games ===
- The Roger Aubrey incarnation of the Destroyer appears in Lego Marvel Super Heroes.
- The Roger Aubrey incarnation of the Destroyer appears in Lego Marvel's Avengers, voiced by Wally Wingert.
