= List of HeroClix supplements =

This is a list of miniatures and supplements for HeroClix, a collectible miniatures game using the Clix system and revolving around the world of superhero comic books and related media. Most prominently, the game features miniatures representing characters from Marvel Comics and DC Comics, though numerous other franchises are represented as well such as Teenage Mutant Ninja Turtles, Street Fighter, Gears of War, and Halo.

== Main series ==
Universe	Series	Released	Current Status
DC Comics	Hypertime	September 2002	Retired
DC Comics	Cosmic Justice	June 2003	Retired
DC Comics	Unleashed	March 2004	Retired
DC Comics	Legacy	March 2005	Retired
DC Comics	Icons	September 2005	Retired
DC Comics	Collateral Damage	February 2006	Retired
DC Comics	Giants	March 2006	Retired
DC Comics	Green Lantern Corps	August 2006	Retired
DC Comics	Origin	February 2007	Retired
DC Comics	Legion of Super-Heroes	June 2007	Retired
DC Comics	Justice League	September 2007	Retired
DC Comics	Crisis (Note: Originally solicited as "Teen Titans")	February 2008	Retired
DC Comics	Batman: Alpha (Note: Batman Alpha is a separate game from standard Heroclix, but the figures are legal in normal HeroClix play.)	June 2008	Retired
DC Comics	Arkham Asylum	October 2008	Retired
DC Comics	Brave and the Bold	April 2010	Retired
DC Comics	"DC 75th Anniversary Set" (Note: Included a selection of DC characters and special tie-in figures to the Brightest Day Comic book event.)	December 2010	Retired
DC Comics	"Green Lantern" (Note: Gravity Feed set, companion to Green Lantern Fast Forces set.)	May 2011	Retired
DC Comics	"Superman featuring Flashpoint"	September 2011	Retired
DC Comics	"The Dark Knight Rises"	July 2012	Retired
DC Comics	The New 52 Justice League	August 2012	Retired
DC Comics	"DC Heroclix 10th Anniversary"	September 2012	Retired
DC Comics	"Batman"	November 2012	Retired
DC Comics	"Streets of Gotham"	December 2012	Retired
DC Comics	"Teen Titans"	May 2013	Retired
DC Comics	"Classic Batman"	September 2013	Retired
DC Comics	"Superman and the Legion of Superheroes"	February 2014	Retired
DC Comics	"The Flash"	October 15, 2014	Retired
DC Comics	"Trinity War"	February 2015	Retired
DC Comics	"Superman/Wonder Woman"	November 4, 2015	Retired
DC Comics	"World's Finest"	February 10, 2016	Retired
DC Comics	"Batman vs Superman"	February 10, 2016	Retired
DC Comics	"The Joker's Wild"	November 2016	Silver Age
DC Comics	"Wonder Woman"	April 2017	Silver Age
DC Comics	"Elseworlds"	July 2017	Silver Age
DC Comics	"Harley Quinn and the Gotham Girls"	November 2017	Silver Age
DC Comics	"Batman: The Animated Series"	July 2018	Silver Age
DC Comics	"Rebirth"	March 2019	Silver Age
DC Comics	"Justice League Unlimited"	May 2020	Silver Age
DC Comics	"Wonder Woman 80th Anniversary"	April 2021	Modern Age
DC Comics	"Batman Team-Up"	January 2023	Modern Age
Independent Publishers	Indy	October 2003	Retired
Marvel Comics	Infinity Challenge	May 2002	Retired
Marvel Comics	Clobberin' Time	November 2002	Retired
Marvel Comics	Xplosion	March 2003	Retired
Marvel Comics	Critical Mass	December 2003	Retired
Marvel Comics	Universe	May 2004	Retired
Marvel Comics	Ultimates	June 2004	Retired
Marvel Comics	Galactus (Note: Two version of Galactus were released. This is the 2004 version of Galactus.)	2004	Retired
Marvel Comics	Mutant Mayhem	November 2004	Retired
Marvel Comics	Fantastic Forces	July 2005	Retired
Marvel Comics	Armor Wars	November 2005	Retired
Marvel Comics	Danger Room	June 2006	Retired
Marvel Comics	Sinister	June 2006	Retired
Marvel Comics	Supernova	November 2006	Retired
Marvel Comics	Days of Future Past	November 2006	Retired
Marvel Comics	2099	December 2006	Retired
Marvel Comics	Fin Fang Foom	May 2007	Retired
Marvel Comics	Avengers	June 2007	Retired
Marvel Comics	Galactus (Note: Two version of Galactus were released. This is the 2007 version of Galactus.)	2007	Retired
Marvel Comics	Mutations and Monsters	November 2007	Retired
Marvel Comics	Secret Invasion	July 2008	Retired
Marvel Comics	Hammer of Thor	November 18, 2009 (Note: The initial piece - Thor's Mighty Chariot - released at San Diego Comic-Con August 2008)	Retired
Marvel Comics	Web of Spider-Man	September 2010	Retired
Marvel Comics	Giant-Size X-Men	March 2011	Retired
Marvel Comics	Captain America	July 13, 2011 (Note: The "Gravity Feed" set released June 2011)	Retired
Marvel Comics	"The Incredible Hulk"	December 2011	Retired
Marvel Comics	"Galactic Guardians"	April 11, 2012 (Note: A "Micro Set" was released on March 21, 2012)	Retired
Marvel Comics	"The Avengers Movie Set"	April 18, 2012	Retired
Marvel Comics	"Chaos War" (Note: Originally titled Mighty Avengers)	July 2012	Retired
Marvel Comics	"Marvel Heroclix 10th Anniversary"	September 2012	Retired
Marvel Comics	"Amazing Spider-Man"	February 2013	Retired
Marvel Comics	"Wolverine and the X-Men"	August 21, 2013	Retired
Marvel Comics	"Invincible Iron Man"	November 20, 2013	Retired
Marvel Comics	"Deadpool"	May 2014	Retired
Marvel Comics	"Guardians of the Galaxy"	August 2014	Retired
Marvel Comics	"Avengers Assemble"	May 5, 2015	Retired
Marvel Comics	"Nick Fury, Agent of S.H.I.E.L.D."	August 2015	Retired
Marvel Comics	"Uncanny X-Men"	May 2016	Retired
Marvel Comics	"Superior Foes of Spider-Man"	August 2016	Silver Age
Marvel Comics	"Deadpool and X-Force"	March 2017	Silver Age
Marvel Comics	"Avengers/Defenders War"	May 2017	Silver Age
Marvel Comics	"What If?"	June 2017	Silver Age
Marvel Comics	"The Mighty Thor"	August 2017	Silver Age
Marvel Comics	"X-Men: Xavier's School"	February 2018	Silver Age
Marvel Comics	"Avengers Infinity"	May 2018	Silver Age
Marvel Comics	"Secret Wars: Battleworld"	October 2018	Silver Age
Marvel Comics	"Earth X"	February 2019	Silver Age
Marvel Comics	"Captain Marvel Movie"	February 2019	Silver Age
Marvel Comics	"Avengers Black Panther and the Illuminati"	June 2019	Silver Age
Marvel Comics	"X-Men the Animated Series: The Dark Phoenix Saga"	September 2019	Silver Age
Marvel Comics	"Captain America and the Avengers"	February 2020	Silver Age
Marvel Comics	"Black Widow Movie"	May 2020	Silver Age
Marvel Comics	"Fantastic Four"	July 2020	Modern Age
Marvel Comics	"Spider-Man and Venom: Absolute Carnage"	September 2020	Modern Age
Marvel Comics	"X-Men: House of X"	October 2020	Modern Age
Marvel Comics	"Fantastic Four: Future Foundation"	February 2021	Modern Age
Marvel Comics	"X-Men: Rise and Fall"	August 2021	Modern Age
Marvel Comics	"Eternals"	December 2021	Modern Age
Marvel Comics	"Avengers Fantastic Four: Empyre"	December 2021	Modern Age
Marvel Comics	"The Avengers: The War of the Realms"	February 2022	Modern Age
Marvel Comics	"Marvel Studios Disney+"	June 2022	Modern Age
Marvel Comics	"X-Men: X of Swords"	August 2022	Modern Age
Marvel Comics	"Avengers Forever"	November 2022	Modern Age
Marvel Comics	"Spider-Man: Beyond Amazing"	March 2023	Modern Age
Mirage Studios	"Teenage Mutant Ninja Turtles"	April 2016	Silver Age
Mirage Studios	"Teenage Mutant Ninja Turtles": Heroes in a Half Shell	October 2016	Silver Age
Mirage Studios	"Teenage Mutant Ninja Turtles": Shredder's Return	February 2017	Silver Age
Mirage Studios	"Teenage Mutant Ninja Turtles": Unplugged	June 2018	Silver Age

== Non-superhero series ==
Universe	Series	Released	Current Status
Assassin's Creed	"Assassin's Creed"	October 2012	Retired
BioShock	"BioShock Infinite"	June 2013	Retired
Dota 2	"Dota 2"	November 2013	Retired
Gears of War	"Gears of War 3	August 2011	Retired
Halo	"Halo	September 2011	Retired
Iron Maiden	"Iron Maiden"	May 2013	Retired
Lone Ranger	"Lone Ranger"	November 2013	Retired
Mage Knight	"Mage Knight: Resurrection"	August 2013	Retired
Middle-Earth	Lord of the Rings	December 2011	Retired
Middle-Earth	"The Hobbit"	November 2012	Retired
Middle-Earth	"Fellowship of the Ring"	May 2013	Retired
Middle-Earth	"The Two Towers"	November 2013	Retired
Middle-Earth	"The Hobbit: The Desolation of Smaug"	November 2013	Retired
Middle-Earth	"Return of the King"	June 2014	Retired
Middle-Earth	"The Hobbit: The Battle of the Five Armies"	November 2014	Retired
Pacific Rim	"Pacific Rim"	July 2013	Retired
Star Trek	"Star Trek Heroclix: Tactics"	February 2012	Retired
Star Trek	"Star Trek Heroclix: Away Team"	July 2012	Retired
Star Trek	"Star Trek Heroclix: Tactics II"	January 2013	Retired
Star Trek	"Star Trek Heroclix: Away Team: The Original Series"	December 2017	Silver Age
Star Trek	"Star Trek HeroClix: Away Team: The Next Generation – Resistance is Futile"	July 2019	Silver Age
Star Trek	"Star Trek HeroClix: Away Team: The Next Generation – To Boldly Go"	October 2019	Silver Age
Street Fighter	Street Fighter	August 2011	Retired
WWE	"WWE Heroclix Series 1 Expansions"	October 2019	Silver Age

== Expansions ==
Set name	Figures	Maps	Dice	Cards	Rulebook	Other
DC Heroclix: 10th Anniversary War of Light Fast Forces Pack	Atrocitus, Star Sapphire, Sinestro, Larfleeze, Indigo-1, Saint Walker	Yes	Unknown	Yes	Unknown	Unknown
DC Heroclix: Blackest Night Starter Set	Flash, Atom, Wonder Woman, Lex Luthor, Scarecrow, Hal Jordan, Mera (Note: All depicted as members of the various "emotion spectrum" Lantern Corps.)	Yes	Yes	Yes	Yes	2D Objects
DC Heroclix: Brightest Day Action Pack	Aquaman, Deadman, Captain Boomerang, Martian Manhunter, Osiris, Hawkgirl, Firestorm (Note: These characters look as they appeared in the Brightest Day comic series.)	Yes	No	Yes	No	No
DC Heroclix: Anti-Monitor Action Pack	Anti-Monitor, Qwardian Thunderer, Shadow Demon	Yes	No	Yes	Yes	Pariah Event Dial
DC Heroclix: Batman Fast Forces Pack	Batman, Batgirl, Nightwing, Red Robin, Alfred Pennyworth, Damian Wayne	Yes (2)	No	Yes	No	No
DC Heroclix: Battle for Smallville Fast Forces Pack	Superman, Lex Luthor, Steel, Supergirl, Bizarro, Kryptonian Renegade	Yes	Yes	Yes	Unknown	Unknown
DC Heroclix: Giants Collector Set	Colossal Boy, Chemo, Validus, Giganta, Atom Smasher, Alloy, Elasti-Girl	None	None	None	None	None
DC Heroclix: Green Lanterns Corps Collector Set	Abin Sur, Arisia Rrab, Ch'p, G'nort, Katma Tui, Ganthet, Tomar-Re	None	None	None	None	None
DC Heroclix: Green Lantern Corps Fast Forces	Green Lantern, Kilowog, Sinestro, Ganthet, Abin Sur, Tomar-Re	Yes	Yes	Yes	No	Quick-Start guide
DC Heroclix: Hypertime Premiere Edition	Batman, Robin, Aquaman, Hawkman, Huntress, Joker, Bane, Man-Bat, Clayface, Harley Quinn	Yes (2)	Yes	Yes	Yes	No
DC Heroclix: Jonah Hex Action Pack	Jonah Hex, Lilah, Quentin Turnbull	Unknown	Unknown	Yes	Unknown	Unknown
DC Heroclix: Legion of Super-Heroes	Saturn Girl, Phantom Girl, Timber Wolf, Young Superman, Cosmic Boy, Lightning Lad, Ultra Boy, Shrinking Violet	Yes	Yes	Yes	Yes	Two 3D Objects
DC Heroclix: Streets of Gotham: Birds of Prey	Huntress, Oracle, Black Canary, Lady Blackhawk, Hawk and Dove	Yes	Unknown	Unknown	Unknown	Unknown
DC Heroclix: Teen Titans: The Ravagers	Terra, Caitlin Fairchild, Beast Boy, Thunder and Lightning, Ridge	Yes	Unknown	Unknown	Unknown	Unknown
DC Heroclix: Man of Steel Starter Set	Superman, Faora, Jor-El, Kryptonian Warrior, Nam-Ek, General Zod	Yes	Yes	Yes	Yes	Unknown
Marvel Heroclix: Avengers Mini Game	Captain America, Hulk, Iron Man, Thor	Unknown	Unknown	Unknown	Unknown	Unknown
Marvel Heroclix: Avengers Starter Set	The First Avenger, The Mighty Avenger, The Armored Avenger, The Covert Avenger, The Sharpshooting Avenger, The Incredible Avenger	Yes	Yes	Yes	Unknown	Unknown
Marvel HeroClix: Days Of Future Past Action Pack	Advanced Sentinel, Hound, Colonel Logan	Yes	No	Yes	No	No
Marvel Heroclix: Fantastic Four Starter Set	Mister Fantastic, Invisible Woman, Thing, Human Torch, Doctor Doom, Doombots	No	No	Yes	Yes	No
Marvel Heroclix: Giant-Size X-Men The Uncanny Fast Forces	Beast, Cyclops, Iceman, Professor X, Rogue, Wolverine	Yes (2)	Yes	Yes	No	No
Marvel Heroclix: Hammer of Thor: Warriors of Asgard Fast Forces	Thor, Loki, Volstagg, Hogun, Fandral, Asgardian Brawler	Yes	Unknown	Unknown	Unknown	Unknown
Marvel Heroclix: Infinity Challenge Premiere Edition	Spider-Man, Wolverine, Elektra, Wolfsbane, Wasp, Hobgoblin, Sabretooth, Boomerang, Scarlet Witch, Kingpin	Yes (2)	Yes	Yes	Yes	No
Marvel Heroclix: The Incredible Hulk Fast Forces Pack	Hulk, She-Hulk, Abomination, Leader, Thunderbolt Ross, Hulkbuster Wrangler	Yes	Yes	Yes	No	Team Suggestions
Marvel Heroclix: Universe	Spider-Man, Wolverine, Wasp, Sabertooth, Elektra, Hobgoblin	Yes	No	No	Yes	No
Marvel Heroclix: X-Men Danger Room	Jean Grey, Cyclops, Beast, Angel, Colossus, Storm	Yes	No	No	Yes	Two 3D objects
Star Trek: Away Team Starter Set	Kirk, Leonard McCoy, Spock, Nyota Uhura, Scotty, Hikaru Sulu, Ensign Pavel Chekov	Unknown	Unknown	Unknown	Unknown	Unknown
Star Trek: Tactics Starter Set	4 Figures	Yes (4)	No	Yes	Yes	No
Star Trek: Tactics II Starter Set	Federation Starship, Klingon Starship, Romulan Starship, Jem'Hadar Starship	Yes (4)	Unknown	Yes	Unknown	Tokens and Markers
Street Fighter Starter Set	Ken, Ryu, Chun-Li, Blanka, Dhalsim, Guile	Yes (2)	No	Yes	Yes	No
The Watchmen Collector's Set	Rorschach, Doctor Manhattan, The Comedian, Silk Spectre, Nite Owl, Ozymandias, Moloch the Mystic and 17 others	Unknown	Unknown	Unknown	Unknown	Unknown
WWE: The Rock & Sock Connection	The Rock, Stone Cold Steve Austin, Mankind, Shawn Michaels, Ric Flair, Triple H	Yes	Yes	Yes	Yes	Light Objects & Terrain Markers

== Limited release figures ==
=== Limited release figures ===
Figure	Type	Found
Hulk, Sabretooth, Destiny	LE	Tournament prizes
Sentinel of the Starways, Pyreus Kril	LE	Given to judges for the Marvel "Coming of Galactus" tournament
Oliver Queen, Hal Jordan, Barry Allen, Arthur Curry	LE	Given to judges for the DC "Starro" tournament
"Masterpieces"	LE / Chase	Wizkids World Championship winners and some were packaged in booster packs, 50 of each figure produced
24 Characters	Not released	Characters from the first Indy Clix set were not released in North America
24 Characters	Not released	Characters from the North American version of the Indy Clix set were not released in the rest of the world
Zombie Hulk, Zombie Wolverine, Zombie Spider-Man, Zombie Colonel America	Chase	1 in 100 Booster sets for the :Supernova" series
Lois Lane, Alfred Pennyworth, Hippolyta, Shazam	Chase	1 in 80 boosters for the "Origin" series
Superman (Earth-Two), Superman (Kingdom Come)	Chase	1 in 80 boosters of the "Crisis" series
World's Finest (Batman and Superman)	Promotion	5,000 produced. Mail away promotional prize.
Veranke impersonating Spider-Woman, Lyja Lazerfist, impersonating Susan Richards	Chase	1 in 80 boosters of the "Secret Invasion" series
The "Illuminati" Skrull	Promotion	5,000 produced. Mail away promotional prize for the "Secret Invasion" series
The Joker (Escape from Arkham)	Promotion	Mail away promotional prize.
Sinestro Corps Batman, Modern Continuity Batman	Chase	1 in 80 boosters of the "Arkham Asylum" series
Thor "Frog of Thunder", Thorbuster Iron Man	Chase	1 in 80 boosters of the "Hammer of Thor" series
Nekron, Black Hand, Black Lantern Kal-L, Black Lantern Martian Manhunter	Chase	1 in 60 boosters for the "Brave and the Bold" series
White Lantern versions of Ice, Green Arrow, Kid Flash, Donna Troy, Hal Jordan, Animal Man, Superman, Flash; Wonder Woman, Superboy	Chase	1 in 10, or 1 per Brick, for the "DC 75th Anniversary" Series
Cable/Deadpool, Colossus/Wolverine, Cyclops/Phoenix, Gambit/Rogue	Chase	1 in 10, or 1 per Brick, for the "Giant Sized X-Men" Series
Weapon X, Captain America in ice, Capwolf, The Captain, Rojhaz	Chase	1 in 20 boosters for the "Captain America" series
Superman (Earth-1), Superman (Son of Darkseid), Superman (Reign of Superman), Kal	Chase	1 in 20 boosters for the "Superman" series
Merry and Pippin, Frodo and Sam, Mr. Underhill	Chase	Unknown ratio in boosters for the "Lord of the Rings" series
Winter Hulk, Hulklops, Icehulk, Hulkmariner, Mighty Thorr, Wolverage	Chase	Unknown ratio in boosters for "The Incredible Hulk" series
Loki holding the Cosmic Cube, Odin, Red Skull	Chase	Unknown ratio in boosters for "The Avengers Movies Set" series
Doctor Doom on Silver Surfer's surfboard, Mr. Fantastic holding the ultimate nullifier, the Keeper, Thanos holding the Cosmic Cube	Chase	Unknown ratio in boosters for the "Galactic Guardians" series
Ant-Man and Wasp, Hawkeye and Mockingbird, Vision and Scarlet Witch, Scarlet Witch and Wonder Man, Sentry and Void, Dr. Doom and Kang, Thor and Hercules, Avengers Prime (Captain America, Iron Man, Thor)	Chase	Unknown ratio in boosters for the "Chaos War" series.
8 Spider-Man figures, Prodigy, Dusk, Ricochet, Hornet, Spider-Man (Ends of the Earth), Spider-Man (Silver Armor), Spider-Man (Armor w/ light pole), Iron Spider	Chase	1 in 10, or 1 per brick for the "Amazing Spider-Man" series
Phoenix Five versions of Cyclops, Emma Frost, Namor, Colossus and Magik	Chase	1 in 20, or 1 per case for the "Wolverine and the X-Men" series
Galactus (Repainted), Terrax, Firelord, Silver Surfer, Stardust	Tournament	As part of the "Avengers" series
Starro the Conqueror, Starro-controlled versions of Aquaman, Green Arrow, Green Lantern and the Flash	Tournament	as part of the "Justice League" series

=== "Buy it By the Brick" figures ===
Series	Figure	Figure Number
DC: Collateral Damage	Krypto	217
Marvel: Sinister	Venom	218
Marvel: Supernova	Doctor Doom	218
DC: Origin	Doctor Fate	212
Marvel: Avengers	Mandarin	061
DC: Justice League	Phantom Stranger	061
Marvel: Mutations and Monsters	Dark Beast	061
DC: Crisis	World's Finest (Superman and Batman)	061
Marvel: Secret Invasion	Super-Skrull: Illuminati	061
DC: Arkham Asylum	Clown Prince of Crime	061
Marvel: Hammer of Thor	Ragnarok Surtur	201
DC: The Brave and the Bold	Batman and Catwoman	100
Marvel: Web of Spider-man	Spider-Man	100
DC: 75th Anniversary	White Lantern Sinestro	100
Marvel: Giant Size X-Men	Jamie Madrox	100
Marvel: Captain America	Nick Fury (Life Model Decoy)	100
DC: Superman	Superman Robot	100
Marvel: The Incredible Hulk	A.I.Marine Hulk	100

== Large figures ==
Typically, HeroClix's large figures were only sold at promotional events such as conventions. These were typically four times the size of normal figures, though larger ones also existed.

Figure	Availability	Notes
Galactus	Convention exclusive	For the 2004 convention season
Silver Surfer	Convention exclusive	For the 2004 convention season
Dark Phoenix	Convention exclusive, Retail	For the 2005 convention season, later sold in stores
Nova	Convention exclusive	For the 2005 convention season
Spectre	Convention exclusive	For the 2006 convention season
Parallax	Convention exclusive	For the 2005 convention season
The Dark Knight	Convention exclusive	For the 2007 convention season
Thor's Mighty Chariot	Convention exclusive, retail	For the 2007 convention season, later sold in stores
Fin Fang Foom	Convention exclusive	For the 2007 convention season
Anti-Monitor - Guardian of Fear	Convention exclusive, retail	For the 2008 convention season, later retail
Batman: Knightfall	Convention exclusive	For the 2008 convention season
Doctor Manhattan	Convention exclusive	For the 2010 San Diego Comic-Con convention.
Sentinel	Retail	Brick and Mortar stores
Advanced Sentinel	Retail	Sold as part of the "Days of Future Past" set.
Sinestro	Retail	Brick and Mortar stores
Phoenix	Retail	Sold through Wizard Magazine
Anti-Monitor	Retail	General retail

== Storyline Organized Play ==
These were promotional efforts held by WizKids focusing on month-long tournaments that played out like various iconic comic book storylines. Coinciding with these were unique figures as participation and/or monthly prizes.

Organized Play Event	Participation Prize	Monthly Prizes	Grand Prize	Universe	Date
The Infinity Gauntlet	The Infinity Gauntlet & Infinity Gems	Adam Warlock, The In-Betweener, The Champion, The Gardener, The Runner, The Collector, The Grandmaster	Thanos w/ Shrine to Death	Marvel	January 2012
No Man's Land	Batman's Utility Belt & Items	Lock-Up, Batgirl, Ultimate Clayface, Poison Ivy, Killer Croc, The Joker & Harley Quinn	The Batcave	DC	Fall 2012
Fear Itself	The Book of the Skull & Serpent's Hammers	Loki, Hela, Thor, Odin, Cul Borson, Nul	The Serpent	Marvel	Summer 2013
AvX (Avengers versus X-Men)	Phoenix Force & Phoenix Fragments, Black Panther, Danger, Professor X, Hope Summers, Team base Avengers/X-Men	Cable, Lei-Kung, White Phoenix Hope, Phoenixbuster Iron Man	Dark Phoenix Cyclops	Marvel	December 2013
War of Light	Power Battery (Green Lantern Corps) & Green Lantern Constructs, Rond Vidar, Guy Gardner, John Stewart, Jade, Kyle Raynor, Simon Baz	Larfleeze, Arkillo, Saint Walker, Atrocitus, Indigo-1, Star Sapphire	Nekron	DC	June 2014
Age of Ultron	Avengers Round Table & Id Cards Hulk, Thor, Captain America, & Iron Man	Grandmaster, Graviton, High Evolutionary and Kang the Conqueror	Quinjet	Marvel	June 2015
Days of Future Past	Wolverine, Colossus and Storm "Wanted poster" ID cards	Kitty Pryde, Rachel Summers and Magneto "Wanted poster" ID cards	Tri-Sentinel	Marvel	August - October 2018

== See also ==
- Wargame
