= Dusk (comics) =

Dusk is the name of several characters appearing in American comic books published by Marvel Comics.

== Fictional character biography ==
=== Peter Parker ===
After traveling to the Negative Zone, Spider-Man encounters a rebellion against Blastaar. Their leader had been a hero called Dusk, who wore a completely black costume. Dusk's name and costume had in fact been taken up by a series of people as a symbol of freedom, with the most recent Dusk being killed by Blastaar's forces shortly after Spider-Man's arrival. At the rebels' request, Spider-Man takes on the costume and leads the rebels to victory. When he returns to his own universe, Spider-Man retains the Dusk costume.

During the Identity Crisis storyline, Spider-Man is accused of murdering small-time criminal Joey Z and assumes the mantle of Dusk and three other identities to continue fighting crime without being caught. As Dusk, Peter pretends to be a mercenary with a quiet and serious personality, and teams up with the Trapster, who had in fact framed him for murder under Norman Osborn's orders. Dusk eventually convinces Trapster to admit his role in framing Spider-Man for Joey Z's murder. After clearing his name, Peter abandons the Dusk costume.

=== Cassie St. Commons ===
Dusk
- Dusk from Slingers #1. Art by ChrisCross.

Publication information
- Publisher: Marvel Comics
- First appearance: Slingers #0 (September 1998)
- Created by: Joseph Harris; Adam Pollina

In-story information
- Alter ego: Cassie St. Commons
- Team affiliations: Slingers
- Abilities: Teleportation; Shadow projection and manipulation Regenerative healing factor Clairvoyance

Cassie St. Commons first appeared in Slingers #0 (December 1998). Cassie is a student at Empire State University who is invited to join the Slingers and given the Dusk costume by Black Marvel. As an initiation test, Cassie is tasked with making a heroic leap across the rooftop of one building and landing on another. While her teammates easily make the jump, Cassie is unable to do so and falls to her death. However, Cassie returns in a half-dead state that gives her the ability to manipulate shadows and teleport using them.

Dusk is later seen being held captive by the Puppet Master in a state of suspended animation, along with Stature, Araña, Tigra, and Silverclaw. The Puppet Master intends to sell his captives off as "interactive art". Dusk makes no further appearances during the storyline, which concludes with Puppet Master's defeat and the release of his other captives.

Dusk returns after the apparent resurrection of Hornet and assists Ricochet and the Scarlet Spider in confronting a demonic monster summoned by the new Hornet, drawing the creature into herself and apparently destroying it. Dusk soon realizes that Hornet is actually Cyber, who has been resurrected by an unidentified entity posing as Black Marvel.

== Powers and abilities ==
The Peter Parker incarnation of Dusk can camouflage in shadows and glide short distances, in addition to his regular abilities.

Cassie St. Commons has many supernatural abilities. Her primary power is the ability to teleport herself (or others) anywhere she wishes to be. She can manipulate shadows to form objects or constructs of solid dark energy. Dusk also can regenerate damaged tissue and she has a clairvoyant ability to sense the whereabouts of her teammates and know if they are in danger.

== In other media ==
- The Peter Parker incarnation of Dusk appears as a costume for Spider-Man in Spider-Man 2: Enter: Electro and Spider-Man: Edge of Time.
- The Peter Parker incarnation of Dusk appears as a playable character in Spider-Man Unlimited.
