= All Winners Comics =

1940s comic book series

- All Winners Comics #1 (Summer 1941), cover art by Alex Schomburg.

Publication information
- Publisher: Timely Comics
- Schedule: Quarterly
- Publication date: (vol. 1) Summer 1941 – Winter 1946/47 (vol. 2) Aug. 1948
- No. of issues: (vol. 1) 20 (vol. 2) 1 (retitled All-Western Winners, Western Winners, Black Rider, Western Tales of Black Rider and Gunsmoke Western)

Creative team
- Created by: Joe Simon
- Written by: Joe Simon; Stan Lee; Otto Binder
- Artist(s): Joe Simon; Jack Kirby; Bill Everett; Alex Schomburg; Al Avison; Al Gabriele; Syd Shores

All Winners Comics is the name of two American comic book series of the 1940s; both were published by Marvel Comics' predecessor, Timely Comics, during the period fans and historians call the Golden Age of Comic Books. A superhero anthology comic in both cases, they variously featured such star characters as Captain America, the original Human Torch, and the Sub-Mariner. All Winners Comics was also the venue for two full-length stories of Marvel's first superhero team, the (hyphenated) All-Winners Squad.

== Publication history ==
=== Volume One ===
Published quarterly, the first volume of All Winners Comics ran 20 issues, numbered #1-19 and #21 (Summer 1941 - Winter 1946/47). While the cover title was All Winners Comics or occasionally simply All Winners, the indicia of all issues in the series (except #21) list the title as All-Winners Comics. The working title was All Aces, as seen in pre-publication house ads in other Timely Comics advising readers to "Watch out for this winner".

All Winners Comics #1 (Summer 1941) contained a 12- to 13-page story each of the Human Torch, by writer-artist creator Carl Burgos; the minor hero Black Marvel, by writer Stan Lee, penciler Al Avison and inker Al Gabriele; Captain America, by co-creators Joe Simon and Jack Kirby (writers), Joe Simon, Kirby, and Avision (pencils), and Joe Simon, Al Gabriele and Syd Shores (inkers); the Sub-Mariner, by writer-artist creator Bill Everett; and the Angel, generally credited, unconfirmably, to writer-artist creator Paul Gustavson. All the characters were preexisting. Additionally, there was a two-page text story by Lee, with spot art by Ed Winiarski.

The following issue, the preexisting superheroes the Destroyer and the Whizzer replaced the Black Marvel and the Angel. This lineup continued through #12, with a one-shot appearance of the Thunderer with the new code name Black Avenger in #6. With World War II wartime paper shortages, the page-count was reduced from 68 to 60 pages with issue #9 (Summer 1943), trimming the Destroyer feature slightly and shrinking that of super-speedster the Whizzer to six pages. With #12 (Spring 1944) it was further reduced to 52 pages, reducing the Destroyer feature to seven pages and eliminating the Whizzer's entirely. Two issues later, the book shrank to 36 pages, before finally returning to 52 pages after the war, with #17 (Winter 1945).

==== All-Winners Squad ====
Timely/Marvel's first superhero team, the All-Winners Squad, featuring Captain America, the Human Torch, the Sub-Mariner, the Whizzer, and Miss America, starred in #19 (Fall 1946), in a 43-page story in seven chapters. A second, same-length All-Winners Squad story appeared in #21 (Winter 1946/47).

Due to the vagaries and often-poor record-keeping of the early days of comic books, the interrupted numbering of the first volume, which has no issue #20, has never been definitively explained. Most comics historians follow a generally accepted theory involving the cost of registering magazines with the U.S. Postal Service in order to receive bulk-mailing rates: a common practice of the time involved retitling an existing series rather than registering a new one. Historians generally agree that after issue #19, All Winners Comics continued as a single-issue teenage-humor comic featuring a Patsy Walker story, All Teen Comics #20 (January 1947). When Timely chose to do another All-Winners Squad story, the publisher retitled the canceled Young Allies Comics, which had ended with #20 (Oct. 1946), resulting in All Winners Comics #21. Most sources say All Winners Comics afterward became the humor title Hedy De Vine Comics, starting with #22 (Aug. 1947).

=== Volume Two ===
A second volume ran one issue (Aug. 1948) before being retitled and reformatted as the Western anthologies All Western Winners (#2-4, Winter 1948 - April 1949), Western Winners (#5-7, June-Dec. 1949), the Western masked-crimefighter series Black Rider (#8-27, March 1950 - March 1955) and Western Tales of Black Rider (#28-31, May-Nov. 1955), and, finally, the anthology Gunsmoke Western (#32-77, Dec. 1955 - July 1963), that last primarily starring Kid Colt.

=== Collections ===
In December 1999, Marvel reprinted #19 as Timely Presents: All-Winners, cover titled Timely Comics Presents All Winners Comics. From 2004 to 2011, Marvel reprinted all of All-Winners Comics under the Marvel Masterworks imprint in four volumes:

- Marvel Masterworks: Golden Age All-Winners Vol. 1 (reprints All-Winners Comics #1-4) (2004)
- Marvel Masterworks: Golden Age All-Winners Vol. 2 (reprints All-Winners Comics #5-8) (2006)
- Marvel Masterworks: Golden Age All-Winners Vol. 3 (reprints All-Winners Comics #9-14) (2008)
- Marvel Masterworks: Golden Age All-Winners Vol. 4 (reprints All-Winners Comics #15-19, 21 & Vol. 2 #1) (2011)

Individual digital issues were released on Marvel Unlimited and ComiXology beginning in a period from 2017 to 2018.
