= All-Winners Squad =

Marvel Comics superhero team

- All Winners Comics #19 (fall 1946). Cover artists unconfirmed, possibly Al Avison and Al Gabriele.

Publication information
- Publisher: Marvel Comics
- First appearance: All Winners Comics #19 (fall 1946)
- Created by: Bill Finger (writer); Vince Alascia; Al Avison; Bob Powell; Syd Shores (artists)

In-story information
- Member(s): Captain America; Bucky; Human Torch; Toro; Sub-Mariner; Whizzer; Miss America; Blonde Phantom; Angel

The All-Winners Squad is a superhero team appearing in American comic books published by Marvel Comics. The company's first such team, it first appeared in All Winners Comics #19 (fall 1946), published by Marvel predecessor Timely Comics during the period fans and historians call the Golden Age of Comic Books.

While the cover title and in-book references to the team have no hyphen, Marvel's website version of The Official Handbook of the Marvel Universe: Teams 2005 lists the team name as the hyphenated "All-Winners Squad", as do the print version and independent sources.

== Publication history ==
=== 1940s Golden Age appearances ===
The All-Winners Squad was created for Marvel predecessor Timely Comics in 1946, during the Golden Age of Comic Books. It consisted of Captain America and sidekick Bucky; the Human Torch and sidekick Toro; the Sub-Mariner; super-speedster the Whizzer; and Miss America.

While the super-team made only two Golden Age appearances—in All Winners Comics #19 (fall 1946) and #21 (winter 1946; there was no issue #20)—it reacquired fan interest upon their being reprinted by Marvel during the 1960s Silver Age of Comic Books.

The first appearance of the All-Winners Squad, titled "The Crime of the Ages", was written by Bill Finger. The 43-page story, split into seven chapters, was pencilled variously by Vince Alascia, Al Avison, Bob Powell, and Syd Shores, and inked by Avison, Alascia, Powell, Allen Bellman, Al Gabriele, and Don Rico. In this story, the team fought the Nazi spy Isbisa.

The second outing, "Menace from the Future World", was written by Otto Binder. The 43-page, seven chapter story was penciled by Alascia, Avison, Shores, and the pseudonymous Charles Nicholas also known as Chuck Nicholas, and inked by Alascia, Avison, Gabriele, Nicholas, and Shores. This story involved the machinations of Madame Death and the time-travelling Future Man.

Timely and Marvel editor-in-chief Stan Lee recalled in 1999:

I suspect that [Timely's publisher] Martin Goodman was the guy behind the All-Winners Squad. It's not the type of title I'd have made up. I think he simply must have said to me one day, 'I wanna do a book featuring the Torch, Toro, C.A., etc.—and let's call it the All-Winners Squad.' In which case I woulda just gotten the stuff together and sent it out. But honestly, although I can remember the title, I can remember nothing else about it.

Latter-day fans during the Silver Age of Comic Books were introduced to the team via reprints 20 years later, with their tale in All-Winners Comics #19 being reprinted in Fantasy Masterpieces #10 (Aug. 1967) and All Winners Comics #21 being reprinted in Marvel Super-Heroes #17–18 (Nov. 1968 & Jan. 1969). Thirty years after this, the entirety of All Winners Comics #19 was reprinted as Timely Presents: All-Winners (hyphen sic; title per reprint indicia), also known as Timely Comics Presents All Winners Comics (title per reprint cover) (Dec. 1999).

All Winners Squad #21 (winter 1946/47), cover by Avison and Charles Nicholas.

=== Retroactive continuity and later appearances ===
The All-Winners Squad has been retconned as the post-war continuation of the Invaders and Liberty Legion (two World War II-era teams created by Marvel in the 1970s) and as the inspiration for the V-Battalion (a post-war superhero team created by Marvel in 2001).

The team was reintroduced in What If? #4 (Aug. 1977), an alternate universe umbrella series. A canonical portion of the story reveals that when Captain America/Steve Rogers and Bucky were presumed dead in 1945, U.S. President Truman asked William Naslund, the patriotically costumed World War II hero the Spirit of '76, to assume the Captain America role, with a young man named Fred Davis as Bucky. They continue to serve in the same roles after the war with the All-Winners Squad, until the android Adam II fatally injured Naslund in 1946.

After Naslund's death, Jeff Mace, the Golden Age Patriot, took over as Captain America, with Davis continuing as Bucky; however, Davis was shot and injured in 1948 and forced to retire. Mace teamed with Betsy Ross, the superheroine Golden Girl, and sometime before 1953 gave up his Captain America identity to marry her. Mace developed cancer and died decades later.

The Liberty Legion, created in 1976 but whose adventures are set in World War II, included two future members of the All-Winners Squad: the Whizzer and Miss America.

The All-Winners Squad made flashback appearances in The Sensational She-Hulk #22 (Dec. 1990), working alongside the Blonde Phantom, in All Winners Comics 70th Anniversary Special (2009) and Captain America: Patriot (2010).

More recently, the All-Winners Squad made a flashback cameo appearance in The Marvels #1 (June 2021), flying over French Indochina in 1947. The team shown included only Sub-Mariner, Human Torch, Toro and Miss America and was featured only in a single panel.
