= Collateral damage (disambiguation) =

Collateral damage is an American military term for unintended or incidental damage during a military operation.

Collateral damage may also refer to:

== Film ==
- Collateral Damage (1993 film), a Canadian short drama film directed by Leonard Farlinger
- Collateral Damage (2002 film), an American action film starring Arnold Schwarzenegger

== Music ==
- Collateral Damage (album), by Spahn Ranch, 1993
- "Collateral Damage", a song by Brutal Truth from Extreme Conditions Demand Extreme Responses, 1992
- "Collateral Damage", a track by Muse from The Resistance, 2009

== Television episodes ==
- "Collateral Damage" (Black-ish), 2018
- "Collateral Damage" (CSI: Miami), 2009
- "Collateral Damage" (Doctors), 2003
- "Collateral Damage" (Edgemont), 2000
- "Collateral Damage" (Millennium), 1999
- "Collateral Damage" (NCIS), 2008
- "Collateral Damage" (The Pretender), 1998
- "Collateral Damage" (Stargate SG-1), 2006
- "Collateral Damage" (The Wire), 2003
- "Collateral Damages" (Law & Order: Special Victims Unit), 2016

== Other uses ==
- Collateral Damage, a 2023 Ali Reynolds novel by J. A. Jance
- Collateral Damage, a 2006 DC HeroClix supplement
