= Cyber (Marvel Comics) =

- Cyber (upper right) on the cover to Wolverine: Origins #15. Art by Marko Djurdjevic.

Publication information
- Publisher: Marvel Comics
- First appearance: Marvel Comics Presents #85 (September 1991)
- Created by: Peter David; Sam Kieth

In-story information
- Full name: Silas Burr (mind and first body); Milo Gunderson (second body)
- Species: Human mutant
- Team affiliations: Pinkerton National Detective Agency
- Notable aliases: Hornet
- Abilities: Superhuman strength and stamina Adamantium skin Retractable claws tipped with powerful hallucinogens and poison Psionic ability to track individual brain patterns

Cyber (Silas Burr) is a supervillain appearing in American comic books published by Marvel Comics. The character is usually depicted as an enemy of Wolverine from the X-Men.

== Publication history ==
Created by writer Peter David and artist Sam Kieth, Cyber first appeared in Marvel Comics Presents #85 (Sept. 1991), though his physical appearance was obscured by a trench coat and hat. He was first fully seen and named in Marvel Comics Presents #86 (Sept. 1991).

Cyber was traditionally depicted as being augmented by adamantium, the same metal that Wolverine was bonded with. Cyber appeared in the 2024 Wolverine series, where he bonded with a new metal called adamantine.

== Fictional character biography ==
=== Origin ===
Silas Burr is a former agent of the Pinkerton National Detective Agency. In 1912, Burr escapes execution after being found guilty on 22 counts of murder. He travels to a Canadian military base, where employer Frederick Hudson took a special interest in Burr's ability to push the men under his command beyond their moral and emotional limits.

In 1959, Burr trains Daken, who is ordered to destroy the training camp. Burr is mortally wounded by Daken, but is saved by Romulus, who chooses him to be the prototype for a process that binds adamantium to his skin.

=== Modern era ===
In the modern era, Cyber resurfaces in Madripoor, as an enforcer for an unnamed drug cartel, where he interferes between the rival crime cartels of Wolverine's ally Tyger Tiger and General Coy. Tyger bites out the villain's left eye before he falls into a truck containing hallucinogens he had earlier used on Wolverine, leading Cyber to flee.

=== Resurrection ===
Cyber resurfaced in astral form and possesses the mutant Milo Gunderson, who has superhuman strength and childlike intelligence. Intent on revenge, he sets off for the Tinkerer, who bonds adamantium to his new body. Unbeknownst to Cyber, Milo's body has a weak heart, which causes him to have a heart attack during a battle. His condition worsens, and Wolverine is forced to bring him to the Tinkerer to treat him. The Tinkerer agrees to construct a pacemaker to stabilize Cyber's heart condition in exchange for the use of Logan's carbonadium synthesizer.

Cyber is later killed by Ogun, who tries to sell his adamantium carapace to Abraham Cornelius after dissolving the rest of his body in an acid bath.

=== Hornet ===
Under unknown circumstances, Cyber returns to life and masquerades as Hornet, a member of the Slingers. He is first seen in Las Vegas following Hydra's takeover of America, having been hired by Forbidden City casino owner Silas Thorne to stage a robbery of a food delivery being sent to the casino of Cassandra Mercury. Hornet summons the Fhtagn, a demonic creature, to attack Scarlet Spider and Ricochet, but is forced to work with them when the Fhtahn grows out of control. It is later revealed that Cyber was resurrected by a demon who had been impersonating Black Marvel.

=== Possessed by Adamantine ===
Some time after abandoning his Hornet identity, Cyber decides to hunt down Wolverine to settle the score with his old foe just before Wolverine relocates to Krakoa. Despite him and all other mutants being granted amnesty on Krakoa, Cyber does not visit Krakoa due to the presence of more powerful mutants in Wolverine's company. After Krakoa's fall, Cyber ambushes Wolverine while he is living in solitude in Canada, but is fought off. The fight between the two unearths a mass of adamantine, which possesses Cyber and turns his adamantium implants into adamantine. Romulus later absorbs the adamantine from Cyber and others possessed by it to empower himself.

== Powers and abilities ==
Silas Burr is a mutant who possesses a number of superhuman abilities, some due to his natural mutation and some due to artificial enhancement. He naturally possesses a degree of superhuman strength. Cyber's skin was bonded with adamantium, making it virtually invulnerable and resistant to physical injury. Cyber wields retractable adamantium claws that are tipped in a powerful hallucinogen capable of affecting Wolverine.

Cyber also possesses a psionic ability that allows him to track specific brainwave patterns across great distances. This ability enabled him to survive in astral form following the attack by the Dark Riders.

== In other media ==
- Cyber appears as a boss in Wolverine: Adamantium Rage.
- Cyber appears as a boss in X-Men: Wolverine's Rage.
