= Al Gabriele =

American comic book artist (1916–1992)

- Born: Alfred J. Gabriele; December 22, 1916 New York City, U.S.
- Died: July 12, 1992 (aged 75) Somers, New York, U.S.
- Areas: Penciller, Inker
- Notable works: Black Marvel, Miss America

Alfred J. Gabriele (December 22, 1916 – July 12, 1992) was an American comic book artist during the 1940s period fans and historians call the Golden Age of comic books. He was known for his work on some of Marvel Comics' earliest Captain America and Sub-Mariner stories, and for co-creating the company's superheroes Black Marvel, Miss America, and possibly, the Whizzer.

His last name is given erroneously in at least some standard references as "Al Gabrielle", with two "L"s, though other references and the vast majority of his credits spell his name with one "L".

== Biography ==
=== Early life and career ===
Gabriele was born in the Bronx, New York City, on December 22, 1916.

Mystic Comics #8 (March 1942). Cover art by Gabriele.

Writer and artist credits were not routinely given during the Golden Age of Comic Books, making full bibliographies difficult for many of the medium's pioneering creators. Al Gabriele's first confirmed credit is as an inker in Blue Bolt Comics #4 (Sept. 1940), from the publisher Novelty Press. Gabriele would continue to work on that character while also freelancing for Fiction House, Harvey Comics (for which drew the debut of the female superhero the Black Cat, in Pocket Comics #1, Aug. 1941), Prize Comics, and most notably Timely Comics, the 1930s–1940s predecessor of Marvel Comics. There Gabriele helped provide art for the hit characters Captain America and Namor the Sub-Mariner, as well as for the popular second-tier characters the Angel and the Destroyer.

Gabriele's first confirmed work for Timely was both penciling and inking the "Mantor the Magician" feature in The Human Torch #2 (Fall 1940).

Circa 1941–1942, Gabriele freelanced through the Jerry Iger Studio.

=== Golden Age of Comics ===
Gabriele's other early work, some of it reprinted in the 1960s Silver Age of comic books and in the modern era, includes penciling and inking the debut of the Black Marvel, an early creation of future Marvel editor Stan Lee, in Mystic Comics #5 (March 1941); inking the caveboy character Tuk in Captain America Comics #2 (April 1941); inking another the early Stan Lee character, Father Time, in Captain America Comics #6 (Sept. 1941); co-penciling (with Alex Schomburg) the 40-page lead story in Sub-Mariner Comics #3 (Fall 1941); and inking character-creator Bill Everett in Sub-Mariner Comics #4 (Winter 1941).

On Captain America, Gabriele inked pencil art by co-creator and future industry legend Jack Kirby on some stories in Captain America Comics #3–4 (May–June 1941) and All Winners Comics #1 (Summer 1941), and on the cover and in all three of the hero's stories in Captain America Comics #8 (Nov. 1941). He would continue contributing to that series and to Sub-Mariner Comics through 1949 and the ends of their respective runs.

Gabriele and fellow artist Al Avison, plus an unknown writer, crafted the debut of Timely's super-speedster the Whizzer in USA Comics #1 (Aug. 1941), though precise creator credits for the character are difficult to confirm. The Whizzer would go to appear in most issues of USA Comics and was part of Timely/Marvel's first superhero team, the All-Winners Squad. The character returned, much older, in 1970s Marvel Comics stories, as well as in flashback stories set during World War II.

With writer Otto Binder, penciler-inker Gabriele created the superheroine Miss America in Marvel Mystery Comics #49 (Nov. 1943). Throughout the decade, Gabriele provided art as well to Timely's Blonde Phantom Comics, Comedy Comics, Kid Comics, and Young Allies Comics.

Gabriele worked as well for Quality Comics, penciling and inking covers and stories both of the spirit-of-America character Uncle Sam in National Comics and Uncle Sam Quarterly. Gabriele also penciled and inked the character Yankee Eagle in Quality's Smash Comics.

Gabriele died on July 12, 1992, aged 75.

=== Later career ===
Gabriele's last confirmed comics work is inking the eight-page Captain America story "The Man Who Wouldn't Give Up", penciled by Carl Burgos in Marvel Mystery Comics #92 (June 1949), the final issue of that title. The Grand Comics Database also lists a tentative Gabriele credit as the cover artist of the following month's Captain America Comics #73 (July 1949).

== Golden Age reprints ==
The Original Black Cat #1 (Oct. 1988). Golden Age reprints published by Recollections. Cover art by Gabriele

As inker, unless otherwise specified (p) for penciler, or (p)(i) for penciler & inker

- Marvel Super-Heroes #15 (July 1968)

Mystic Comics #5 (March 1941)

"Origin of the Black Marvel" (p)(i)

- The Invaders #10 (Nov. 1976)

Captain America #22 (January 1943)

"The Wrath of the Reaper"

- The Original Black Cat #6 (Aug. 1991)

Pocket Comics #1 (Aug. 1941)

"Origin of the Black Cat" (p)(i)

- Marvel Masterworks: Golden Age Captain America (Marvel, 2005)

Captain America Comics #2 (April 1941)

Tuk, Caveboy: "The Valley of the Mist"

Captain America Comics #3 (May 1941)

"The Return of the Red Skull" (co-inker)

Captain America Comics #4 (June 1941)

"The Unholy Legion" (co-inker)

Captain America Comics #8 (Nov. 1941):

"The Strange Mystery of The Ruby of the Nile...And its Heritage of Horror"
"Murder Stalks The Maneuvers"
"Case Of The Black Witch"

- Marvel Masterworks: Golden Age Sub-Mariner (Marvel, 2005)

Sub-Mariner Comics #4 (Winter 1941)

"The Horror That Walked"

- Marvel Masterworks: Golden Age All-Winners Comics (Marvel, 2006)

All Winners Comics #1 (Summer 1941)

Black Marvel: "The Order of the Hood"
Captain America: "The Case of the Hollow Men" (co-inker)

- Marvel Milestones: Ultimate Spider-Man, Ultimate X-Men, Microman & Mantor the Magician (Nov. 2006)

The Human Torch #2 (Fall 1940)

Mantor the Magician: "Hidden Treasure Means Death"
