= Thunderer (Marvel Comics) =

American comic book character

- Thunderer (center front) as depicted in his first appearance of Daring Mystery Comics #7

Publication information
- Publisher: Marvel Comics
- First appearance: As the Thunderer: Daring Mystery Comics #7 (April 1941); As Black Avenger: All-Winners Comics #6 (Fall 1942)
- Created by: John Compton; Carl Burgos

In-story information
- Alter ego: Jerry Carstairs
- Team affiliations: Six American Warriors
- Notable aliases: Black Avenger
- Abilities: Good hand to hand combatant High-impact voice amplification

The Thunderer (Jerry Carstairs) is a superhero appearing in American comic books published by Timely Comics.

== Publication history ==
He first appeared in Daring Mystery Comics #7 (Timely, April 1941) and was created by John Compton and Carl Burgos. He returned in issue #8 (Jan 1942). In All Winners Comics #6 (Sept 1942), he changed his hero name to the Black Avenger. This was his last Golden Age appearance. The Thunderer wore a red costume with blue highlights, but the color scheme was reversed on the covers.

== Fictional character biography ==
Frustrated that the United States did not seem to be dealing with crime or Nazi saboteurs, radio operator Jerry Carstairs created a costume with a built-in microphone and fought for justice as the Thunderer. In his first recorded appearance, Jerry learned that radio station WWLX was really a front for Nazi Fifth Columnists who were transmitting secret messages hidden in music. Learning that they were targeting his girlfriend Eileen Conroy, a newspaper reporter, he foiled their operation. In order to protect his secret identity, Jerry acted like a meek weakling while in his civilian guise. Thunderer later uncovered the machinations of a hideously deformed dwarf named Gore who hated beautiful people so much that he rigged Morse code death traps to kill his victims over the radio. The Thunderer destroyed his operation, and Gore was killed in a house fire caused by faulty wiring in his equipment.

Thunderer's activities were few and far between due to the limitations his position with the FCC provided in giving him leads to criminal or spy activities. The Thunderer briefly changed his name (but not his costume) to the Black Avenger. In the fall of 1942, the FBI caught a Nazi spy who resembled Jerry and convinced him to go undercover to expose a spy ring sending defense secrets back to Nazi Germany. As the Black Avenger, Jerry managed to round up the Nazis including their leader Kurt Weidner and turn him over to justice.

In 1943, the Black Avenger is among a number of heroes who are killed by the Red Skull wielding the Cosmic Cube. The Cosmic Cube is recovered by Private Paul Anslen, who uses it to resurrect all the dead heroes. When Red Skull is defeated, the heroes use the Cosmic Cube to wipe the Black Avenger's memories of the event and preserve history.

During the "Last Days" part of the Secret Wars storyline, Thunderer is seen as a resident of Valhalla Villas, a retirement home for ex-heroes and ex-villains in Miami. He is temporarily de-aged during the Incursion between Earth-616 and Earth-1610.

In Marvel Comics #1000, it was revealed that Jerry was a subject in a side project of Project Rebirth, the government project that created Captain America, called Project Thunderer. Thunderer's mask is a magical item called the Eternity Mask, which was created by a group of renegade occultists from Eternity's own substance during the days of King Arthur. When his friend William Naslund, the Spirit of '76 (as Captain America) was killed by the android Adam II, Thunderer blamed the Scientists' Guild, also known as the Three Xs and later the Enclave, for their role in Naslund's death as they were responsible for bankrolling Phineas Horton to create another android like the Human Torch, as well as supplying Adam-II's programming with the Three Xs's ideas for the next stage of mankind, leading to the android's madness. Changing his identity to Dark Avenger, Carstairs swears to take down the Three Xs. However, Carstairs was killed and the Eternity Mask taken by the Enclave. His corpse would be found by Marvel Boy, with a recording to stop the Scientists Guild.

== Powers and abilities ==
Thunderer is an expert hand-to-hand combatant and possesses a powerful sonic scream derived from his costume.

== In other media ==
- The Thunderer appears in the Spider-Man: The Animated Series five-part episode "Six Forgotten Warriors", voiced by Hansford Rowe in the present and Brett King in a flashback. This version, along with the Black Marvel, the Destroyer, Miss America, and the Whizzer, obtained his powers from a flawed attempt at recreating the process that empowered Captain America during World War II, which he regulates with a special ring. After Captain America seemingly sacrificed himself to stop the Red Skull from activating a Doomsday machine, Thunderer and the other heroes took possession of the machine's activation keys and retired.
