= Slingers (Marvel Comics) =

Comic book superheroes

- Promotional art to the comic book series Slingers. Art by Mike Wieringo. Top row: Ricochet, Hornet. Bottom row: Dusk, Prodigy.

Publication information
- Publisher: Marvel Comics
- First appearance: Slingers #0 (1998 September)
- Created by: Joseph Harris (writer); Adam Pollina, ChrisCross (artists)

In-story information
- Member(s): Dusk; Hornet; Prodigy; Ricochet

The Slingers are a group of superheroes appearing in American comic books published by Marvel Comics. They starred in their own eponymous short-lived comic book.

== Publication history ==
The group first appeared in Slingers #0, a free promotional comic book included in an issue of Wizard. Slingers #1 had four versions produced, each telling a fourth of the first issue's story from the point of view of one of the four team members. The series acquired a small fan base, but failed to sustain sales and was cancelled with issue #12.

The Slingers appeared in the series Ben Reilly: Scarlet Spider, written by Peter David.

== Fictional team history ==
The Slingers were four teenage superheroes inspired by Spider-Man, each using an identity that Spider-Man had assumed during the events of "Identity Crisis". After this crisis had ended, Spider-Man discarded the four costumes, which were acquired by Black Marvel and given to the Slingers.

After learning that Black Marvel had received the costumes through a deal with the demon Mephisto, the Slingers work to free his soul from Mephisto. Black Marvel dies, free from Mephisto's grasp, and the team apparently disbands. Ricochet made several guest appearances in the Marvel comic Runaways as a member of Excelsior, a group of former teenage heroes whose goals are to help fellow teenage superheroes adjust to mundane lives, and to dissuade other super-powered teenagers from becoming heroes.

After the breakup of the Slingers, Hornet is killed in battle with Wolverine, who had been brainwashed by the Hand. Prodigy resurfaced fighting against Iron Man during the "Civil War" event. Eventually he joined with Captain America's underground movement, and later became a recruit for the Initiative program. At the end of Avengers: The Initiative, Prodigy was released from Prison 42, in which he was detained for having resisted Norman Osborn's regime, and began working as a motivational speaker while trying to reunite the Slingers.

After Hydra's takeover of America was thwarted, Hornet was seen active in Las Vegas, prompting Ricochet and Dusk to travel there to confront their apparently resurrected ally, even as the Hornet steals from a casino on the part of his employer Silas Thorne and is confronted by Scarlet Spider. After the initial confrontation, Ricochet learns that the new Hornet is not only working with Prodigy, but received his costume from Black Marvel and is thus convinced to join the other Slingers in forcing the Scarlet Spider to turn himself over to the police for beating Silas Thorne so badly that he was hospitalized. After they take Cassandra Mercury hostage, she is found thanks to Ben Reilly and Kaine Parker tracking her hidden mobile phone, where they discover that the Slingers are being led by Black Marvel. However, Dusk realizes that Black Marvel has no soul. Hornet is revealed to be the villain Cyber, who was revived by an unidentified entity posing as Black Marvel.

== Team members ==
The four members of the Slingers were:

- Dusk (Cassie St. Commons): The Goth daughter of a rich socialite couple from Connecticut. She died in Slingers #0, and mysteriously returned from the dead in Slingers #1. Dusk has many supernatural abilities. Her primary power is the ability to teleport herself, or others, anywhere she wishes. She can manipulate shadows to form objects or constructs of solid dark energy. She also has the ability to sense the whereabouts of her teammates, and knows if they are in danger.
- Hornet (Eddie McDonough): A freshman at Empire State University who was born with cerebral palsy, he wore a suit of flight-capable powered armor which enabled him to fly at high speeds. Micro-servos in the armored suit enhanced his strength beyond normal levels and allowed him to use his withered right arm. His gauntlets contained wrist blasters that could fire darts filled with a fast-acting sedative, which he called "Stingers," as well as powerful laser beams. After the group dissolved, he and Ricochet eventually returned to fighting crime together until Hornet was killed battling a brainwashed Wolverine. His costume was later acquired and used by the villain Cyber.
- Prodigy (Ritchie Gilmore): The leader of the group; a wrestler who attended Empire State University. He is an athletic, stubborn loner. Prodigy's costume is mystically infused with power, giving him superhuman strength, durability, and the ability to leap incredible distances, appearing to fly. Prodigy gave up his powers at the conclusion of the Slingers series. However, he later resurfaced, having apparently regained his powers.
- Ricochet (Johnny Gallo): A mutant with superhuman agility, enabling him to leap great distances. He has incredible reflexes, which, combined with his leaping powers, enable him to seemingly bounce off walls. His mutant powers also give him a "Danger Sense", which functions much like Spider-Man's Spider-Sense. Ricochet originally used discs that he rebounded off walls, much as he himself did. Hornet later provided Ricochet with special "gimmick" discs, which can return to him after a short time, or even self-destruct.
