= Ricochet (comics) =

Ricochet is a fictional character appearing in American comic books published by Marvel Comics. It was originally an alternate identity used by Spider-Man and later adopted by college student Jonathan "Johnny" Gallo.

== Peter Parker ==
After being accused of murder during the Identity Crisis storyline, Peter Parker assumes four alternate identities to continue fighting crime without being caught. One of the personas that he adopts is Ricochet, utilizing flying discs created by his wife Mary Jane Watson. As Ricochet, Peter relies primarily on his agility and poses as a criminal for hire. Using this identity, Peter collaborates for a time with his old foe Delilah in searching for information about the new villain Black Tarantula. After Peter clears his name, he abandons all of his new personas and returns to his Spider-Man identity.

=== Powers and abilities ===
In addition to his regular abilities the Ricochet costume had flying discs on the sleeves of its jacket which he used as weapons. As Ricochet, Peter Parker did not utilize his spider-sense or enhanced speed to avoid exposing his identity.

== Johnny Gallo ==
Ricochet
- Johnny Gallo as Ricochet from Slingers #1. Art by ChrisCross.

Publication information
- Publisher: Marvel Comics
- First appearance: Slingers #0 (December 1998)
- Created by: Joseph Harris; Adam Pollina

In-story information
- Alter ego: Jonathan "Johnny" Gallo
- Species: Human mutant
- Team affiliations: Slingers; Loners; Avengers Academy
- Abilities: Superhuman agility, reflexes and coordination Danger sense Use of throwing discs

=== Publication history ===
Johnny Gallo first appeared as Ricochet in Slingers #0 (December 1998). The character was created by Joseph Harris and Adam Pollina.

Ricochet appeared as a supporting character in Avengers Academy, first in issue #21 (Jan. 2012), and occasionally thereafter in the series.

=== Fictional character biography ===
Johnny Gallo is a college student who lives with his widowed father. He carefully conceals from both his father and his girlfriend Kathy that he is a mutant with enhanced agility and the ability to sense danger. Johnny is later recruited into the Slingers by Black Marvel, utilizing a copy of Peter Parker's Ricochet costume. Another of the Slingers, Hornet, becomes Ricochet's closest friend and gives him special throwing discs to use in battle.

The Slingers later learn that Black Marvel had made a deal with the demon Mephisto to recruit the youths who would become the Slingers and was being held captive by him. Ricochet attempts to abandon Black Marvel, but Hornet convinces him to free Black Marvel instead. Black Marvel dies free of Mephisto's influence, with the Slingers disbanding shortly afterward.

Ricochet becomes disillusioned because his efforts had not earned him any fame or recognition, and blames himself for Hornet's death at the hands of a brainwashed Wolverine. He joins another team of teen heroes, Excelsior (now called the Loners), whose goal is to dissuade other superpowered young people from becoming heroes. During the aftermath of M-Day, when a majority of mutants lose their powers, Ricochet was one of the few who are unaffected.

Johnny is considered as a 'potential recruit' for the Initiative program. He is later seen as a part-time student at the Avengers Academy.

=== Scarlet Spider ===
Following Hydra's takeover of America, Hornet appears to return from the dead. When Ricochet confronts Hornet, he uses an amulet to summon an other-dimensional monster. Hornet is revealed to be the villain Cyber, who had been utilizing a copy of Hornet's costume.

=== Powers and abilities ===
Ricochet has the mutant power of superhuman agility, enabling him to leap great distances. He has incredible reflexes and coordination which, combined with his leaping powers, allow him to seemingly bounce off walls (ricochet, as it were). Ricochet's mutant powers also give him a "Danger Sense" that functions much like Spider-Man's "Spider-Sense". Thanks to Hornet, Ricochet has special throwing discs, which he stores on the sleeves of his jacket. His original discs could bounce off walls and targets with incredible force. Hornet later gave Ricochet discs that could explode on impact. Ricochet's super reflexes and coordination enable him to throw his discs with amazing speed and accuracy.

== In other media ==
=== Television ===
- An original incarnation of Ricochet, Fancy Dan, appears in The Spectacular Spider-Man, voiced by Phil LaMarr. He is a member of the Enforcers who uses a suit that grants him the power to bounce at high speeds.
- John Gallo appears in Your Friendly Neighborhood Spider-Man, voiced by Roger Craig Smith. This version is a security guard for Oscorp whom Norman Osborn passes off as Spider-Man to protect Peter Parker's identity.

=== Video games ===
- The Peter Parker incarnation of Ricochet appears as an alternate skin for Spider-Man in Spider-Man: Edge of Time via DLC.
- The Peter Parker incarnation of Ricochet appears as an alternate skin for Spider-Man in The Amazing Spider-Man 2. This version is inspired by an in-universe comic book series that Peter enjoyed as a child and sought to recreate.
