= Ed Winiarski =

American Writer & artist (1911-1975)

- Winiarski in August 1942
- Born: Edward Winiarski; May 6, 1911
- Died: December 1975 (aged 64)
- Areas: Writer, Artist
- Pseudonyms: Win; Winny; Fran Miller

Ed Winiarski (May 6, 1911 – December 1975) who sometimes signed his work "Win" or "Winny" and sometimes used the pseudonym Fran Miller, his wife's maiden name, was an American comic book writer-artist known for both adventure stories and talking animal cartooning in the late-1930s and 1940s Golden Age of comic books.

Winiarski was one of the first generation of comic-book professionals, contributing in the mid-1930s to National Allied Publications, one of the companies that would evolve into DC Comics. He later worked for Timely and Atlas – the 1940s and 1950s forerunners, respectively, of Marvel Comics – as well as for Hillman Periodicals and Prize Comics.

== Biography ==
=== Early life and career ===
Winiarski started in animation, employed as an assistant animator at The Van Beuren Corporation in the mid-30s. His earliest known feature in comics is the four-part story "Jungle Fever", which he wrote and drew across New Adventure Comics #14–16 (March, May–June 1937) and More Fun Comics #22 (July 1937), published by the company National Comics, the future DC Comics. Winiarski additionally drew and probably wrote the "Charlie Chan"-like Asian private eye feature "Mr. Chang" in Detective Comics #2 (April 1937). These were among the first of 100-story credits he would compile for the future DC. By 1941, Winiarski was also drawing for the companies Quality Comics and Hillman Periodicals.

=== Timely and Atlas ===
His first known credit for Timely Comics was art for the two-page text filler "All Winners" – a story that was also one of future Marvel legend Stan Lee's first comic works – in All-Winners Comics #1 (Summer 1941). This was reprinted in Marvel Masterworks: Golden Age All-Winners Comics, Volume 1 (Marvel, 2006; ISBN 0-7851-1884-5).

As both writer and artist, he created the early superhero-humor feature "The Vagabond" in U.S.A. Comics #2 (Nov. 1941) – continuing it in the next two issues and in Young Allies Comics #4 and Comedy Comics #11 – as well as the single-appearance crusading-journalist feature "Powers of the Press", starring reporter Tom Powers (U.S.A. Comics #3). Also for Timely, Winiarski also wrote and drew such humor features as "The Creeper and Homer" (in Krazy Komics), "Oscar Pig" (in Terrytoons Comics), Millie the Model, and Hedy De Vine Comics.

For Timely's 1950s successor, Atlas Comics, he drew numerous horror and suspense stories for anthologies including Strange Tales and Journey into Mystery, while also penciling, inking and probably writing the antics of trouble-prone "Buck Duck" in that animal's namesake comic and its predecessor, It's a Duck's Life.

In 1958, Winiarski did some work for Major Magazines' Mad-like satiric magazine Cracked. His last recorded credits are as penciler and inker of two four-page stories published the same month: "He Wore a Black Beard", in Strange Tales #66, and "He Stole 50 Years", in World of Fantasy #15 (both Dec. 1958).

Nearly a dozen Winiarski stories were reprinted in 1970s Bronze Age comics published by Marvel Comics.

== Personal life ==
Winiarski married his Pratt Institute classmate, Frances Anna Miller, in June 1939; he sometimes would use her maiden name, Fran Miller, as a pen name. The couple had two children, sons Bruce and William. Winiarski died in December 1975 of a heart condition.
