= Mystic Comics =

Marvel comic book series

Mystic Comics is the name of three comic book series published by the company that eventually became Marvel Comics. The first two series were superhero anthologies published by Marvel's 1930–1940s predecessor, Timely Comics, during what fans and historians call the Golden Age of comic books. The third, simply titled Mystic, was a horror-suspense anthology from Marvel's 1950s forerunner, Atlas Comics.

== Mystic Comics (Timely) ==
Mystic Comics
- Mystic Comics #10 (cover-dated Aug. 1942), featuring the Destroyer. Cover art by Al Gabriele and Syd Shores.

Publication information
- Publisher: Timely Comics
- Schedule: (Vol. 1) Monthly (Vol. 2) Bimonthly
- Format: Series
- Genre: Superhero
- Publication date: (Vol. 1) March 1940 – August 1942 (Vol. 2) October 1944 – March 1945
- No. of issues: (Vol. 1) 10 (Vol. 2) 4
- Main character(s): (Vol. 1) Blazing Skull, Destroyer, Black Widow, Thin Man, Blue Blaze, Flexo the Rubber Man, Terror (Vol 2) Destroyer, Angel, Young Allies, Human Torch, Tommy Tyme

Creative team
- Written by: Various
- Artist: Various
- Editor(s): (Vol. 1) Martin Goodman, Joe Simon, Stan Lee (Vol. 2) Vincent Fago

=== Volume 1 ===
The first two series titled Mystic came during the 1940s Golden Age of Comic Books from publisher Martin Goodman, whose Timely Comics by the early 1960s would evolve into Marvel Comics. The first four issues were nominally edited by Goodman, but the contents came almost entirely from either the Funnies, Inc., or Harry "A" Chesler studios. Editor Joe Simon relaunched the series after a seven-month gap, with future Marvel chief Stan Lee taking over with issue #8 or #9 after Simon left the company. It ran 10 issues (March 1940 – Aug. 1942).

A superhero anthology with no regular starring feature, Mystic Comics introduced at least three notable characters: the Blazing Skull (issue #5, March 1941), who made appearances both in the Golden Age and in the 2000s; and the Destroyer (issue #6, Oct. 1941), noted by comics historian and former Marvel editor-in-chief Roy Thomas as "Stan's most popular superhero creation before the Fantastic Four". The Destroyer was cover-featured for the last half of the run. The Black Widow is one of comic books' first super-powered, costumed female characters; She appeared in Mystic Comics #4 (Aug. 1940) and #5 (Mar. 1941), as well as #7 (Dec. 1941). An antihero who killed evildoers to deliver their souls to Satan, her master, she is unrelated to Marvel Comics' later superspy character, Black Widow.

Additional superheroes introduced in this initial series include the Thin Man, by artist Klaus Nordling and an unknown writer (issue #4, Aug. 1940); the Blue Blaze, a living dead man who disappeared into a swamp in his final appearance, by Harry Douglas who signed his name "Harry / Douglas" leading to much confusion and many theories over the possibility of two creators. (#1-4); the robot hero Flexo the Rubber Man (#1-4); the Black Marvel (#5-9), by artist Al Gabriele and an unknown writer (not Stan Lee as often mis-attributed); and the Terror (#5-10) by writer Phil Sturm and penciler Syd Shores. The non-superhero trio of detectives the 3X's [sic] (issue #1) comprised Timely's first team feature.

=== Volume 2 ===
Timely's second series titled Mystic Comics was a shorter-lived superhero anthology that ran four issues (Oct. 1944 – March 1945). This later revival was edited by Vincent Fago as Lee had left for military duty in early 1942. Paul Gustavson's costumed detective the Angel was cover-featured for the first three, with one or two stories in each, and the Young Allies on issue #4. Timely star the Human Torch appeared in the first two issues, and time traveler Tommy Tyme in the first three. The Destroyer was the only character with a story every issue.

=== Other ===
A one-shot publication, Mystic Comics 70th Anniversary Special #1 (Oct. 2009), featured a new 22-page story of the Golden Age Vision by writer-artist David Lapham, and reprints of Sub-Mariner, Human Torch and Vision stories from Marvel Mystery Comics #12 and 14.

=== Complete list of features ===
- Flexo the Rubber-Man #1-4 (March 1940-August 1940)
- The Blue Blaze #1-4 (March 1940-August 1940)
- Zephyr Jones and His Rocket Ship #1 (March 1940)
- The 3 X’s #1 (March 1940)
- The Deep Sea Demon #1 (March 1940)
- Dakor the Magician #1-3 (March 1940-June 1940)
- The Dynamic Man #1-4 (March 1940-August 1940)
- The Master Mind Excello #2-3 (April 1940-June 1940)
- Space Rangers #2-3 (April 1940-June 1940)
- Taxi Taylor and His Wonder Car #2 (April 1940)
- The Invisible Man Known as Dr. Gade #2-4 (April 1940-August 1940)
- Zara of the Jungle #2-3 (April 1940-June 1940)
- Hercules David #3-4 (June 1940-August 1940)
- Thin Man #4 (August 1940)
- The Black Widow #4, 5, 7 (August 1940, March 1941, December 1941)
- Merzah the Mystic #4 (August 1940)
- Adventures of Super Slave #5 (March 1941)
- Sub-Earth Man #5 (March 1941)
- The Black Marvel #5-10 (March 1941-August 1942)
- The Blazing Skull #5-9 (March 1941-May 1942)
- The Moon-Man #5 (March 1941)
- The Terror #5-10 (March 1941-August 1942)
- The Destroyer #6-10; vol. 2 1-4 (October 1941-August 1942; October 1944-March 1945)
- The Challenger #6-10 (October 1941-August 1942)
- The Witness #7-9 (December 1941-May 1942)
- Davey and the Demon #7-10 (December 1941-August 1942)
- Dr. Robert Fields #8 (March 1942)
- Gary Gaunt #9 (May 1942)
- Inky Dinky #10 (August 1942)
- The World of Wonder (August 1942)
- Father Time #10 (August 1942)
- Billy #10 (August 1942)
- Red Skeleton #10 (August 1942)
- The Angel, vol. 2, #1-3 (October 1944-Winter 1944)
- The Human Torch, vol. 2, #1-2 (October 1944-Fall 1944)
- Tommy Tyme, vol. 2, #1-3 (October 1944-Winter 1944)
- Terry Vance, vol. 2, #1-2 (October 1944-Fall 1994)
- The Young Allies, vol. 2, #4 (March 1945)
- Detective Mike Trapp, vol. 2, #4 (March 1945)

== Mystic (Atlas Comics) ==
Mystic

Publication information
- Publisher: Atlas Comics
- Schedule: Monthly
- Format: Series
- Genre: Horror
- Publication date: March 1951 – Aug. 1957
- No. of issues: 61

Creative team
- Written by: Various
- Artist: Various
- Editor: Stan Lee

Titled simply Mystic and published by Marvel's 1950s iteration, Atlas Comics, this was a 61-issue horror-suspense anthology (March 1951-Aug. 1957).

Mystic debuted shortly before Atlas' Strange Tales, increasing the company's science fiction/fantasy/horror line from four titles to six. Begun prior to the creation of the comic-book industry's self-censorship board, the Comics Code Authority, Mystic softened its horror when it went under the auspices of the Comics Code beginning with issue #37 (May 1955). The series' contributors included artists Bill Everett and John Severin.

Mystic ran until the collapse of American News Company, Atlas' distributor, which forced Atlas to undergo drastic restructuring and the cancellation of most of its titles.

== Collected editions ==
- Marvel Masterworks: Golden Age Mystic Comics Volume 1 (Mystic Comics #1-4) Will Murray's introduction hypes how much better the content of the second volume would be, but it was never published.
