= Hornet (comics) =

Series of fictional characters in American comic books

Hornet is an identity used by five fictional characters appearing in American comic books published by Marvel Comics: two supervillains, and three superheroes. Both the first and third versions have suffered from physical disabilities.

== Publication history ==
Although the armor of the third Hornet first appeared in Spider-Man as one of the four new superheroes Peter Parker had taken on, this version first appeared in Slingers #0 and was created by Joseph Harris, Todd Dezago, and Mike Wieringo. Speculation that the deceased Hornet in Wolverine vol. 3 #23 was not Eddie, but instead someone else who took on the name and costume, has been disproven by The Loners writer C. B. Cebulski, and The Loners #2 states that Hornet was indeed killed by Wolverine.

== Fictional character biography ==
=== Scotty McDowell ===
The Hornet

Publication information
- Publisher: Marvel Comics
- First appearance: (As Scotty McDowell): Spider-Woman #21 (Dec. 1979) (As Hornet): Spider-Woman #31 (Oct. 1980)

In-story information
- Alter ego: Scotty McDowell
- Abilities: Superhuman strength High-speed flight via insect-like wings Bio-electricity projection

Scotty McDowell is a wheelchair-using criminologist who assists in Spider-Woman's cases. He is kidnapped by mad scientist Karl Malus, who injects him with a formula containing insect DNA. However, Scotty does not display any initial effects from the injection.

Scotty later develops superhuman strength, insect-like wings, and the ability to generate bursts of electricity, but he remains unable to walk. He decides to become the superhero Hornet, but over time he becomes aggressive and resentful of Spider-Woman. After subduing Hornet, Spider-Woman learns that Malus had given him powers for the sole purpose of having him kill Spider-Woman. Spider-Woman purges the formula from Scotty's bloodstream, stripping him of his powers and aggression.

Spider-Woman learned that although the formula did make Scotty more aggressive, the resentment he felt was real. Scotty admits that he had been in love with Spider-Woman, but felt that she did not notice him. He was also jealous of the attention garnered with the woman's heroic deeds. This puts a strain on their friendship, and Spider-Woman ends their "working relationship". Scotty accepts this as well, taking a job farther away to preserve what was left of their friendship.

=== Peter Parker ===
After he is accused of murder during the Identity Crisis storyline, Peter Parker utilizes Hornet and three other identities to continue fighting crime without being caught. As Hornet, Peter utilizes gauntlets based on Ben Reilly's web-shooters and a wing harness created by Hobie Brown.

Peter used the Hornet identity with great success for several days, being a popular hero with the media after his debut featured him thwarting the Looter's attempt to rob the Daily Bugle. However, Vulture realizes that Hornet is actually Spider-Man after recognizing his characteristic banter and exposes him. Peter abandons the Hornet persona, and soon after clears his name.

=== Eddie McDonough ===
The Hornet

Publication information
- Publisher: Marvel Comics
- First appearance: Slingers #0 (December 1998)
- Created by: Joseph Harris; Todd Dezago; Mike Wieringo

In-story information
- Alter ego: Eddie McDonough
- Species: Human
- Team affiliations: Slingers
- Abilities: Armored suit grants: Superhuman strength High-speed flight via jet-powered wing harness Laser beam/sedative dart projection via gauntlets

Eddie McDonough is a science whiz who compensates for his palsied right arm with a knack for inventing. He is given the Hornet costume by Black Marvel and modifies it to enhance his strength while remaining lightweight. With the suit enhancing his strength, nobody but Hornet's teammate Dusk notices his disability.

Hornet later learns that Black Marvel had made a deal with the demon Mephisto to regain his youth and powers. When Mephisto collects Black Marvel's soul, he takes the Slingers as well and sends them to Hell. While the other Slingers intend to leave Black Marvel to this fate, Hornet is able to forgive him, allowing him to leave Hell. In doing so, Hornet's armor and Prodigy's powers are lost. The team disbands and Hornet and Prodigy apparently retire.

At some point, Hornet and Prodigy return to fighting crime together. Hornet ends up going alone against Hydra and a mind-controlled Wolverine and is killed in battle.

=== Silas Burr ===
Following Hydra's takeover of America, a man sporting Eddie McDonough's Hornet costume appears in Las Vegas, hired by Forbidden City casino owner Silas Thorne to stage a robbery of a mass food delivery being sent to another casino. When he is confronted by Scarlet Spider, Hornet declines to answer questions about his apparent resurrection and flees. It is later revealed that this Hornet is actually Cyber, who was brought back to life by an unidentified entity posing as Black Marvel.

=== Hobie Brown ===
During the King in Black storyline, Hobie Brown is shown to have taken up the alias of Hornet during the Symbiote invasion.

== Powers and abilities ==
Scotty McDowell possessed superhuman strength and insect-like wings enabling him to fly at high-speeds. His "Hornet Sting" could project focused bursts of bio-electricity that could stun or kill a person.

In addition to Peter Parker's regular abilities, the Hornet costume gave Peter the ability to fly and shoot fast-acting sedative stinger darts.

Eddie McDonough's Hornet costume had a jet-powered wing harness that enabled him to fly at high speeds. Micro-servos in the armored suit enhanced his strength to superhuman levels. His gauntlets contained wrist blasters that could fire darts filled with a fast-acting sedative, or powerful laser-beams.

Silas Burr retains his predecessor's costume, which includes a jet-powered wing harness that enabled high-speed flight, enhanced strength through micro-servos in the armored suit, and wrist blasters in the gauntlets that could fire darts filled with a fast-acting sedative, or powerful laser-beams. He has also been shown using an amulet that allows him to summon a twisted demon creature, but it is unclear if he can do this on a regular basis after the amulet that allowed him to summon the creature was destroyed.

== In other media ==
- Hornet appears as a downloadable costume for Spider-Man in Spider-Man: Edge of Time.
- Hornet appears as an additional costume for Spider-Man in The Amazing Spider-Man 2.
- The Peter Parker incarnation of Hornet appears as a playable character in Spider-Man Unlimited.
