= Angel (Thomas Halloway) =

The Angel
- Angel from The Marvels Project #4. Art by Steve Epting

Publication information
- Publisher: Marvel Comics
- First appearance: Marvel Comics #1 (Oct. 1939)
- Created by: Paul Gustavson

In-story information
- Alter ego: Thomas Halloway
- Team affiliations: All-Winners Squad; V-Battalion; Scourges of the Underworld
- Abilities: Excellent acrobat and hand to hand combatant Accomplished disguise artist, occult scholar and pilot Skilled detective Flight via mystic cape Use of knives and other weapons

The Angel (Thomas Halloway, often shortened to Tom Halloway) is a superhero appearing in American comic books published by Marvel Comics. Created by Paul Gustavson during the Golden Age of Comic Books, the Angel first appeared in Marvel Comics #1 (Oct. 1939), the first publication of Marvel Comics' predecessor, Timely Comics.

The Angel is a non-superpowered detective who nonetheless wore a superhero costume.

== Publication history ==
Created by artist Paul Gustavson and written either by him, Ray Gill, or another writer, the Angel debuted in Timely Comics' Marvel Comics #1 (Oct. 1939). The Angel was among the more popular Timely characters after the "big three" of the Human Torch, the Sub-Mariner and Captain America. The Angel had over 100 Golden Age appearances — starting in that initial Marvel title (which changed its name to Marvel Mystery Comics with issue #2), up through #79 (Dec. 1946); as the sole backup feature in Sub-Mariner Comics #1-21 (Spring 1941-Fall 1946); and in occasional appearances in All Winners Comics #1 (Summer 1941), The Human Torch #5 (Summer 1941), Mystic Comics vol. 2 #1-3, (Oct.-Winter 1944), Daring Comics #10 (Winter 1944-45).

In Superhero Comics of the Golden Age, Mike Benton writes: "The Angel, like some of the other features that Gustavson drew and wrote, owed a heavy debt to the pulp magazine heroes and detectives. Like the Shadow and the Spider, the Angel had few compunctions about operating outside the law and using severe measures -- especially if it meant scaring the hell out of criminals."

In the Kree–Skrull War story arc (1972), Rick Jones summons Angel, the Blazing Skull, the Fin, the Patriot, and the Vision via the Destiny Force to battle the Skrulls.

The Angel is one of the central characters of the eight-issue miniseries The Marvels Project (Aug. 2009-May 2010), by writer Ed Brubaker and penciler Steve Epting.

== Fictional character biography ==
A costumed detective with no superpowers, the Angel is among the few such heroes to wear no mask, and in his Golden Age appearances makes no effort to conceal his identity as independently wealthy Thomas Halloway, a former surgeon. Thomas' mother died in childbirth - consequently he was brought up in the prison where his father was a warden. He became well-known among the inmates and even befriended some, which gave him a unique insight into the criminal underworld. He earned his moniker when he saved one of his friends from being wrongly put to death. Though he wore a costume like a superhero, he wore no mask to conceal his identity. He later acquires the Cape of Mercury, which allows him to fly, but he has used this ability only occasionally, as on his campaign against the foreign spy Cat's Paw.

The Angel was already active by the time of the first Human Torch and Sub-Mariner adventures, and active as far back as 1936. He fights alongside Namor against World War II "Nazombies", and was later retconned as a member of both the All-Winners Squad and the V-Battalion after the war. The Angel was also possibly a Secret Service agent for a brief period of time.

According to Jess Nevins' Encyclopedia of Golden Age Superheroes, the Angel "fights everything from gangsters to Brains in a Jar to crazed pygmies, including Armless Tiger Man, Count Lust, the Epicure of Crime, the Gargoyle, the Wolfman, and Dr. Hyde, who steals the eyes from victims and ransoms them back for $100,000."

Halloway remained active as an older character in 1990s comics and was revealed as the primary force behind the murderous vigilante group Scourges of the Underworld, which assassinated a large number of lesser supervillains and archcriminals. Confronted by U.S. Agent, the former Angel explained that he was guilt-ridden by the lives he had failed to save, which curdled into a vendetta against all costumed villains. The Agent took him into custody, but Halloway was acquitted at trial.

Halloway's grandson, Jason Halloway, is given his grandfather's mask and weapons at the end of The Marvels Project #8 (July 2010).

== Angel (Simon Halloway) ==
The Angel

Publication information
- Publisher: Marvel Comics
- First appearance: Captain America #442 (Aug. 1995)

In-story information
- Alter ego: Simon Halloway

An elderly homeless man said to have once been the Angel appeared in Marvel Super-Heroes vol. 3 #7 (Oct. 1991) and in The Incredible Hulk #432-433 (Aug.-Sept. 1995). This was originally intended to have been Thomas Halloway, but due to it conflicting with established continuity these appearances were retconned to have been Simon Halloway, Thomas' brother, who had assumed the identity of the Angel and substituted for his brother on numerous occasions. In the 1990s, Simon was living as a homeless man in Manhattan, where he was killed by the supervillain Zeitgeist.

== Powers and abilities ==
Thomas Halloway had no superpowers but he was an acrobat and hand-to-hand combatant, an accomplished disguise artist, occult scholar and pilot and a skilled detective. He also wore the Cape of Mercury, which granted him the ability to fly, and used knives and other weapons.

== Other versions ==
An alternate version of Thomas Halloway / Angel from Earth-90214 appears in X-Men Noir. This version is a private investigator and the child of the warden of a prison called the Welfare Pen. Thomas' mother died in childbirth - consequently he was brought up in the prison where his father was a warden. There, he was instructed by a number of experts, as well as a number of the inmates, which gave him a unique insight into the underworld. He earned his moniker when he saved an inmate from execution. In the final issue of the series, Thomas' twin brother Robert is revealed to have also used the Angel identity and sacrifices himself to stop Jean Grey.
