= Timely Comics =

American comic book publisher

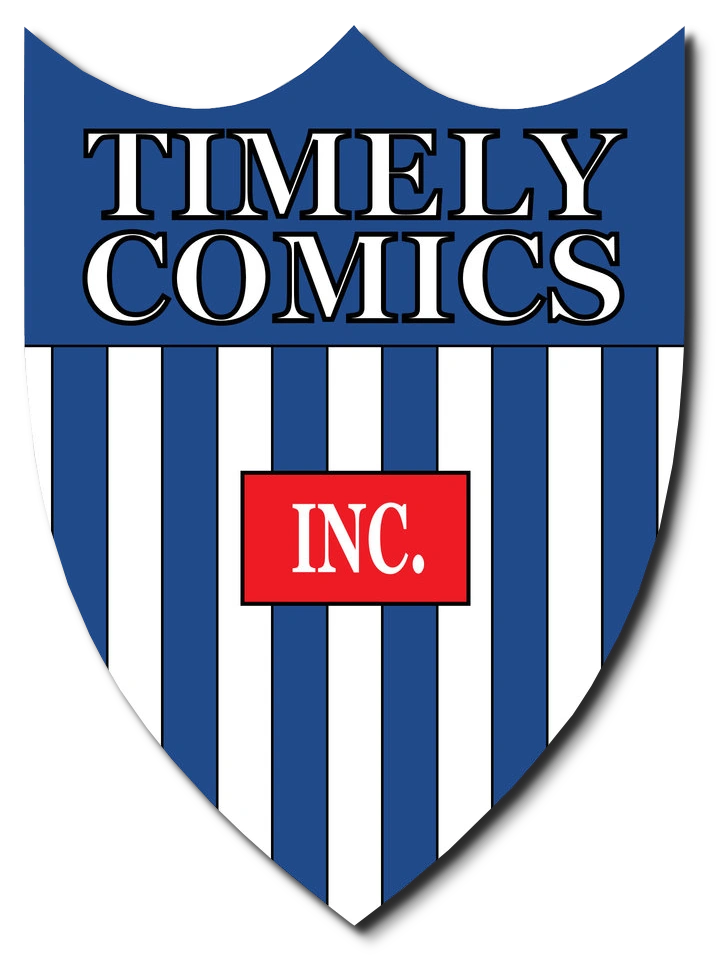
- The original Timely Comics logo.
- Type: Division
- Industry: Publishing
- Founded: 1939; 87 years ago
- Defunct: 1950; 76 years ago
- Fate: Rebranded as Atlas Comics in 1951
- Successor: Atlas Comics, Marvel Comics
- Headquarters: Manhattan, New York
- Key people: Martin Goodman
- Products: Comic books, magazine

Timely Comics was the common name for the earliest comic book arm of American publisher Martin Goodman, which would evolve to become Marvel Comics by the 1960s.

Founded in 1939 during the Golden Age of Comic Books, "Timely" was the umbrella name for the group of corporations forming the comics division of pulp magazine publisher Goodman, whose business strategy involved having a multitude of corporate entities all producing the same product. The company's first publication in 1939 used Timely Publications, based at his existing company in the McGraw-Hill Building at 330 West 42nd Street in New York City. Offices moved to the 14th floor of the Empire State Building from 1942 until the imprint became Atlas Comics in 1950. Marvel repurposed the Timely Comics brand in June 2016 for a series of 16 low-priced reprint comics.

== History ==
=== Creation ===
In 1939, with the emerging medium of comic books proving hugely popular, and the first superheroes setting the trend, pulp-magazine publisher Martin Goodman founded Timely Publications, basing it at his existing company in the McGraw-Hill Building at 330 West 42nd Street in New York City. Goodman – whose official titles were editor, managing editor, and business manager, with Abraham Goodman officially listed as publisher – contracted with the newly formed comic book packager Funnies, Inc. to supply material.

His first effort, Marvel Comics #1 (Oct. 1939), featured the first appearances of writer-artist Carl Burgos' android superhero, the Human Torch, and Paul Gustavson's costumed detective the Angel. It also contained the first published appearance of Bill Everett's anti-hero Namor the Sub-Mariner, created for the unpublished movie-theater giveaway comic Motion Picture Funnies Weekly earlier that year, with the eight-page original story now expanded by four pages.

Also included were Al Anders' Western hero the Masked Raider; the jungle lord Ka-Zar the Great, with Ben Thompson beginning a five-issue adaptation of the story "King of Fang and Claw" by Bob Byrd in Goodman's pulp magazine Ka-Zar #1 (Oct. 1936); the non-continuing-character story "Jungle Terror", featuring adventurer Ken Masters, drawn and possibly written by Art Pinajian under the quirky pseudonym "Tohm Dixon" or "Tomm Dixon" (with the published signature smudged); "Now I'll Tell One", five single-panel, black-and-white gag cartoons by Fred Schwab, on the inside front cover; and a two-page prose story by Ray Gill, "Burning Rubber", about auto racing. A painted cover by veteran science-fiction pulp artist Frank R. Paul featured the Human Torch, looking much different from the interior story.

Marvel Comics #1 (Oct. 1939), the first comic book from Marvel predecessor Timely Comics. Cover art by Frank R. Paul.

That initial comic, cover-dated October 1939, quickly sold out 80,000 copies, prompting Goodman to produce a second printing, cover-dated November 1939. The latter is identical except for a black bar over the October date in the inside-front-cover indicia, and the November date added at the end. That sold approximately 800,000 copies. With newfound success, Goodman began assembling an in-house staff, hiring Funnies, Inc. writer-artist Joe Simon as editor. Simon brought along his collaborator, artist Jack Kirby, followed by artist Syd Shores. Goodman then formed Timely Comics, Inc., beginning with comics cover-dated April 1941 or Spring 1941.

There is evidence that "Red Circle Comics", a name that would be used for an unrelated imprint of Archie Comics in the 1970s and 1980s – may have been a term in use as Goodman prepared to publish his first comic book. Historian Les Daniels, referring to Goodman's pulp-magazine line, describes the name Red Circle as "a halfhearted attempt to establish an identity for what was usually described loosely as 'the Goodman group' [made] when a new logo was adopted: a red disk surrounded by a black ring that bore the phrase 'A Red Circle Magazine.' But it appeared only intermittently, when someone remembered to put it on [a pulp magazine's] cover. Historian Jess Nevins, conversely, writes that, "Timely Publications [was how] Goodman's group [of companies] had become known; before this, it was known as 'Red Circle' because of the logo that Goodman had put on his pulp magazines...." The Grand Comics Database identifies 23 issues of Goodman comic books from 1944 to 1959 with Red Circle, Inc. branding, and a single 1948 issue under Red Circle Magazines Corp.

=== Golden Age of Comic Books ===
Marvel Comics was rechristened Marvel Mystery Comics with issue #2 (Dec. 1939); the magazine would continue under that title through #92 (June 1949) before becoming Marvel Tales through #159 (Aug. 1957). Timely began publishing additional series, beginning with Daring Mystery Comics #1 (Jan. 1940), Mystic Comics #1 (March 1940), Red Raven Comics #1 (Aug. 1940), The Human Torch #2 (premiering Fall 1940 with no cover date and having taken over the numbering from the unsuccessful Red Raven), and Captain America Comics #1 (March 1941). Going on sale in December 1940, a year before the bombing of Pearl Harbor and already showing the hero punching Hitler, that first issue sold nearly one million copies.

With the hit characters Human Torch and Sub-Mariner now joined by Simon and Kirby's seminal patriotic hero Captain America, Timely had its "big three" stars of the era fans and historians call the Golden Age of Comic Books. Rival publishers National Comics Publications / All-American Comics, the sister companies that would evolve into DC Comics, likewise had their own "big three": Superman and Batman plus the soon-to-debut Wonder Woman. Timely's other major competitors were Fawcett Publications (with Captain Marvel, introduced in 1940); Quality Comics (with Plastic Man and Blackhawk, both in 1941); and Lev Gleason Publications (with Daredevil, introduced in 1940 and unrelated to the 1960s Marvel hero).

Captain America Comics #1 (March 1941), art by Jack Kirby (penciler)

Other Timely characters, seen in both modern-day retroactive-continuity appearances and in flashbacks, include the Angel, the next-most-popular character in terms of number of appearances; the Destroyer, an early creation of future Marvel chief Stan Lee; super-speedster the Whizzer; the flying and super-strong Miss America; the original Vision, who inspired Marvel writer Roy Thomas in the 1960s to create a Silver Age version of the character; and the Blazing Skull and the Thin Man, two members of the present-day New Invaders.

Just as Captain America had his teenage sidekick Bucky and DC Comics' Batman had Robin, the Human Torch acquired a young partner, Toro, in the first issue of the Torch's own magazine. The Young Allies—one of several "kid gangs" popular in comics at the time—debuted under the rubric the Sentinels of Liberty in a text story in Captain America Comics #4 (June 1941) before making it to the comics pages themselves the following issue, and then eventually into their own title.

Seeing a prevailing "fire and water" theme, Timely was responsible for comic books' first major crossover, with a two-issue battle between the Human Torch and the Sub-Mariner that spanned Marvel Mystery Comics #8–9 (telling the story from the two characters' different perspectives).

After the Simon and Kirby team moved to DC Comics in late 1941, having produced Captain America Comics through issue #10 (Jan. 1942), Al Avison and Syd Shores became regular pencilers on the title, with one generally inking over the other. Stan Lee (né Stanley Lieber), a cousin of Goodman's by marriage who had been serving as an assistant since 1939, at age 16, (Note: Lee's account of how he began working for Marvel's predecessor, Timely, has varied. He has said in lectures and elsewhere that he simply answered a newspaper ad seeking a publishing assistant, not knowing it involved comics, let alone his cousin Jean's husband, Martin Goodman: I applied for a job in a publishing company ... I didn't even know they published comics. I was fresh out of high school, and I wanted to get into the publishing business, if I could. There was an ad in the paper that said, "Assistant Wanted in a Publishing House." When I found out that they wanted me to assist in comics, I figured, 'Well, I'll stay here for a little while and get some experience, and then I'll get out into the real world.' ... I just wanted to know, 'What do you do in a publishing company?' How do you write? ... How do you publish? I was an assistant. There were two people there named Joe Simon and Jack Kirby—Joe was sort-of the editor/artist/writer, and Jack was the artist/writer. Joe was the senior member. They were turning out most of the artwork. Then there was the publisher, Martin Goodman... And that was about the only staff that I was involved with. After a while, Joe Simon and Jack Kirby left. I was about 17 years old [sic], and Martin Goodman said to me, 'Do you think you can hold down the job of editor until I can find a real person?' When you're 17, what do you know? I said, 'Sure! I can do it!' I think he forgot about me, because I stayed there ever since. However, in his 2002 autobiography, Excelsior! The Amazing Life of Stan Lee (cited under References, below), he says: My uncle, Robbie Solomon, told me they might be able to use someone at a publishing company where he worked. The idea of being involved in publishing definitely appealed to me. ... So I contacted the man Robbie said did the hiring, Joe Simon, and applied for a job. He took me on and I began working as a gofer for eight dollars a week.... Joe Simon, in his 1990 autobiography The Comic Book Makers (cited under References, below), gives the account slightly differently: "One day [Goodman's relative known as] Uncle Robbie came to work with a lanky 17-year-old in tow. 'This is Stanley Lieber, Martin's wife's cousin,' Uncle Robbie said. 'Martin wants you to keep him busy.'" In an appendix, however, Simon appears to reconcile the two accounts. He relates a 1989 conversation with Lee: Lee: "I've been saying this [classified-ad] story for years, but apparently it isn't so. And I can't remember because I['ve] said it so long now that I believe it."... Simon: "Your Uncle Robbie brought you into the office one day and he said, 'This is Martin Goodman's wife's nephew.' [sic] ... You were seventeen years old." Lee: "Sixteen and a half!" Simon: "Well, Stan, you told me seventeen. You were probably trying to be older.... I did hire you.") was promoted to interim editor just shy of his 19th birthday. Showing a knack for the business, Lee stayed on for decades, eventually becoming Marvel Comics' publisher in 1972. Fellow Timely staffer Vincent Fago would substitute during Lee's World War II military service.

The staff at that time, Fago recalled, was, "Mike Sekowsky. Ed Winiarski. Gary Keller was a production assistant and letterer. Ernest Hart and Kin Platt were writers, but they worked freelance; Hart also drew. George Klein, Syd Shores, Vince Alascia, Dave Gantz, and Chris Rule were there, too".

In 1942, Goodman moved his publisher operations to the 14th floor of the Empire State Building, where it remained until 1951.

=== Funny animals, and people ===
The superheroes were the products of what Timely referred to as the "adventure" bullpen. The company also developed an "animator" bullpen creating such movie tie-in and original talking animal comics as Terrytoons Comics, Mighty Mouse, All Surprise Comics, Super Rabbit Comics, Funny Frolics, and Funny Tunes, renamed Animated Funny Comic-Tunes. Former Fleischer Studios animator Fago, who joined Timely in 1942, headed this group, which consisted through the years of such writer/artists as Hart, Gantz, Klein, Platt, Rule, Sekowsky, Frank Carin (né Carino), Bob Deschamps, Chad Grothkopf, Pauline Loth, Jim Mooney, Moss Worthman a.k.a. Moe Worth, and future Mad magazine cartoonists Dave Berg and Al Jaffee.

Features from this department include "Dinky" and "Frenchy Rabbit" in Terrytoons Comics; "Floop and Skilly Boo" in Comedy Comics; "Posty the Pelican Postman" in Krazy Komics and other titles; "Krazy Krow" in that character's eponymous comic; "Tubby an' Tack", in various comics; and the most popular of these features, Jaffee's "Ziggy Pig and Silly Seal" and Hart's "Super Rabbit", the cover stars of many different titles. Timely also published one of humor cartoonist Basil Wolverton's best-known features, Powerhouse Pepper. The first issue, cover-dated January 1943, bore no number, and protagonist Pepper looked different from his more familiar visualization (when the series returned for four issues, May–Nov. 1948) as the bullet-headed naif in the striped turtleneck sweater.

Additionally, Timely in 1944 and 1945 initiated a sitcom selection of titles aimed at female readers: Millie the Model, Tessie the Typist and Nellie the Nurse. The company continued to pursue female readers later in the decade with such superheroines as Sun Girl; the Sub-Mariner spin-off Namora; and Venus, the Roman goddess of love, posing as a human reporter. Patsy Walker, Millie the Model, Tessie the Typist and other Timely humor titles also included Harvey Kurtzman's "Hey Look!" one-pagers in several issues.

Future Comic Book Hall of Fame artist Gene Colan, a Marvel mainstay from 1946 on, recalled that, "The atmosphere at Timely was very good, very funny. ... [I worked in] a big art room and there were about 20 artists in there, all stacked up. Syd [Shores] was in the last row on my side, and there was another row on the other side. Dan DeCarlo was there, several other people – Vince Alascia was an inker; Rudy LaPick sat right behind me," with Mike Sekowsky "in another room".

Yet after the wartime boom years – when superheroes had been new and inspirational, and comics provided cheap entertainment for millions of children, soldiers and others – the post-war era found superheroes falling out of fashion. Television and mass market paperback books began competing for readers' leisure time. Goodman began turning to a wider variety of genres than ever, emphasizing horror, Westerns, teen humor, crime and war comics, and introducing female heroes to try to attract girls and young women to read comics. In 1946, for instance, the superhero title All Select Comics was changed to Blonde Phantom Comics, and now starred a masked secretary who fought crime in an evening gown. That same year, Kid Komics eliminated its stars and became Kid Movie Comics. All Winners Comics became All Teen Comics in January 1947. Timely eliminated virtually all its staff positions in 1948.

=== Time after Timely ===
Timely Comics
- The revised Timely Comics label
- Type: Division
- Industry: Publishing
- Founded: 2015
- Headquarters: United States
- Products: Comic books, magazine
- Parent: Marvel Comics

The precise end-point of the Golden Age of comics is vague, but for Timely, at least, it appears to have ended with the cancellation of Captain America Comics at issue #75 (Feb. 1950) – by which time the series had already been Captain America's Weird Tales for two issues, with the finale featuring merely anthological horror/suspense tales and no superheroes. Sub-Mariner Comics and Human Torch Comics had already ended with #32 (June 1949) and #35 (March 1949) respectively, and the company's flagship title, Marvel Mystery Comics, starring the Angel, ended that same month with #92, becoming the horror anthology Marvel Tales beginning with issue #93 (Aug. 1949). Goodman began using the globe logo of the Atlas News Company, the newsstand-distribution company he owned, on comics cover-dated Nov. 1951.

All New All Different Avengers #1 (Nov. 2015). Cover art by Alex Ross.

In 2015, Marvel registered the trademark "Timely Comics". The following year, Marvel announced that Timely Comics would be the name of a new imprint of low-priced reprint comics.

=== Marvel branding ===
Publisher Martin Goodman's business strategy involved having his various magazines and comic books published by a number of companies all operating out of the same office and with the same staff. One of these shell companies under which Timely Comics was published was named Marvel Comics by at least Marvel Mystery Comics #55 (May 1944). As well, some comics' covers, such as All Surprise Comics #12 (Winter 1946–47), were labeled "A Marvel Magazine" many years before Goodman would formally adopt the name in 1961. This brand extended to the company's short-lived editorial advisory board in 1948 in an effort to compete with other publishers like DC Comics and Fawcett Comics, and used the moniker Marvel Comic Group in its editorials.

== Timely characters and creators ==
List of characters making multiple appearances, either in Timely Comics solely or in Timely and subsequent companies Atlas Comics and Marvel Comics.

Character	Debut	Reintroduced (Modern Age)	Creators
Sub-Mariner	Motion Picture Funnies Weekly #1 (April, 1939)	Fantastic Four #4 (May 1962)	Bill Everett (writer/artist)
American Ace	Motion Picture Funnies Weekly #1 (April, 1939)	All-Winners Squad: Band of Heroes #4 (Nov. 2011)	Paul J. Lauretta (penciler). Writer unknown.
Angel	Marvel Comics #1 (Nov. 1939)	The Avengers #97 (March 1972); U.S. Agent #3 (Aug. 1993)	Paul Gustavson (artist). Writer unknown.
Archie the Gruesome	Comedy Comics #10 (Jun. 1942)	All-Winners Squad: Band of Heroes #1 (Aug. 2011)	
Black Marvel	Mystic Comics #5 (March 1941)	Slingers #1 (Dec. 1998)	Al Gabriele (penciller-inker). Writer unknown but not Stan Lee as often mis-credited.
Black Widow	Mystic Comics #4 (Aug. 1940)	Marvels #1 (Jan. 1994)	George Kapitan (writer), Harry Sahle (penciller)
Blazing Skull	Mystic Comics #5 (March 1941)	The Avengers #97 (March 1972); Invaders #2 (1993)	Bob Davis (writer-penciler)
Blonde Phantom	All Select Comics #11 (Fall 1946)	The Sensational She-Hulk #4 (July 1989)	Stan Lee (writer), Syd Shores (penciller)
Blue Blade	U.S.A. Comics #5 (Summer 1942)	The Twelve #1 (March 2008)	Unknown writer and artist.
Blue Blaze	Mystic Comics #1 (March 1940)		Harry Douglas (writer-penciler), signed "Harry / Douglas", leading to numerous theories of two creators or other pseudonym situations which have proven incorrect.
Bucky Barnes	Captain America Comics #1 (March 1941)	As Winter Soldier: Captain America vol. 5, #1 (Jan. 2005)	Joe Simon (writer), Jack Kirby (penciller)
Blue Diamond	Daring Mystery Comics #7 (April 1941)	Marvel Premiere #29 (April 1976)	Ben Thompson (penciller). Unknown writer.
Captain America	Captain America Comics #1 (March 1941)	The Avengers #4 (March 1964)	Joe Simon (writer), Jack Kirby (penciller)
Captain Terror	U.S.A. Comics #2 (Nov. 1941)	Captain America #442 (Aug. 1995)	Mike Suchorsky (penciller). Unknown writer.
Captain Wonder	Kid Komics #1 (Feb. 1943)	The Twelve #1 (March 2008)	Otto Binder (writer), Frank Giacoia (penciller)
Challenger	Daring Mystery Comics #7 (April 1941)	Marvel Knights Spider-Man #9 (Feb. 2005)	Charles Nicholas (penciller). Unknown writer.
Citizen V	Daring Mystery Comics #8 (Jan. 1942)	Thunderbolts −1 (July 1997)	Ben Thompson (penciler, as "Tom Benson"). Unknown writer.
Comet Pierce	Red Raven Comics #1 (Aug. 1940)		Jack Kirby (writer-artist)
Davey Drew (Davey and the Demon)	Mystic Comics #7 (December 1941)	All-Winners Squad: Band of Heroes #3 (October 2011)	Howard James
Defender	U.S.A. Comics #1 (August 1941)	Daredevil #66 (Dec. 2004)	Joe Simon and Jack Kirby (writers). Penciler uncertain
Destroyer	Mystic Comics #6 (Oct. 1941)	Invaders #26 (March 1978)	Stan Lee (writer), Jack Binder (penciler)
Dynamic Man	Mystic Comics #1 (March 1940)	The Twelve #1 (March 2008)	Daniel Peters
Electro	Marvel Mystery #4 (Feb. 1940)	The Twelve #1 (March 2008)	Steve Dahlman (writer-penciler)
Falcon	Human Torch Comics #2 (June 1940)	Marvel Knights Spider-Man #9 (Feb. 2005)	Carl Burgos (writer - artist)
Father Time	Captain America Comics #6 (Sep. 1941)	All-Winners Squad: Band of Heroes #2 (Sep. 2011)	Stan Lee (writer)
Ferret	Marvel Mystery Comics #4 (Feb. 1940)	The Marvels Project #3 (Dec. 2009)	
Fiery Mask	Daring Mystery Comics #1 (Jan. 1940)	The Twelve #1 (March 2008)	Joe Simon (writer-penciller)
Fighting Yank	Captain America Comics #17 (Aug. 1942)	All-Winners Squad: Band of Heroes #2 (Sep. 2011)	
Fin	Daring Mystery Comics #7 (April 1941)	The Avengers #97 (March 1972); Invaders #5 (March 1976)	Bill Everett (writer-penciller)
Flash Foster	Daring Mystery Comics #1 (Jan. 1940)	All-Winners Squad: Band of Heroes #1 (Aug. 2011)	
Flexo the Rubber Man	Mystic Comics #1 (April 1940)	Free Comic Book Day 2022: Spider-Man/Venom (May 2022)	Jack Binder (penciller). Unknown writer
Human Torch	Marvel Comics #1 (Oct. 1939)	Fantastic Four Annual #4 (Nov. 1966)	Al Fagaly (penciller), Carl Burgos (writer-penciller)
Hurricane	Captain America Comics #1 (March 1941)	Marvel Universe #7 (Dec. 1998)	Jack Kirby and Joe Simon (writers), Jack Kirby (penciler)
Invisible Man	Mystic Comics #2 (Apr. 1940)	All-Winners Squad: Band of Heroes #1 (Aug. 2011)	
Jack Frost	U.S.A. Comics #1 (Aug. 1941)	Marvel Premiere #29 (April 1976)	Stan Lee (writer), Charles Nicholas (penciler)
Jap Buster Johnson	U.S.A Comics #6 (Dec. 1942)	All-Winners Squad: Band of Heroes #2 (Sept. 2011)	
Jimmy Jupiter	Marvel Mystery Comics #28 (Feb. 1942)	Captain America #1 (Sept. 2011)	
John Steele	Daring Mystery Comics #1	The Marvels Project #1 (Oct. 2009)	Larry Antonette (writer and, as "Dean Carr", penciler)
Laughing Mask	Daring Mystery Comics #2	The Twelve #1 (March 2008)	Will Harr (writer), Maurice Gutwirth (penciler)
Major Liberty	U.S.A. Comics #1 (Aug. 1941)		
Marvel Boy (first)	Daring Mystery Comics #6 (Sept. 1940)		Jack Kirby (penciller), Joe Simon and Al Avison (inkers)
Marvel Boy (second)	U.S.A. Comics #7 (Feb. 1943)		Bob Oksner (writer-penciller-inker)
Marvex the Super-Robot	Daring Mystery Comics #3 (April 1940)	All Select Comics 70th Anniversary Special #1 (Sept. 2009)	Unknown writer and penciler from the Harry "A" Chesler studio
Master Mind Excello	Mystic Comics #2	The Twelve #1 (March 2008)	
Mercury	Red Raven Comics #1 (Aug. 1940)	Marvel Universe #7 (Dec. 1998)	Martin A. Bursten (writer), Jack Kirby (artist)
Merzah the Mystic	Mystic Comics #4 (Aug. 1940)	All-Winners Squad: Band of Heroes #1 (Aug. 2011)	
Miss America	Marvel Mystery Comics #49 (Nov. 1943)	Giant-Size Avengers #1 (Aug. 1974)	Otto Binder (writer), Al Gabriele (penciller)
Miss Patriot	Human Torch Comics #4 (Spring 1941) (as Mary Morgan); Marvel Mystery Comics #50 (Dec. 1943) (as Miss Patriot)	Captain America: Patriot #1 (Nov. 2010)	
Mister E	Daring Mystery Comics #2	The Twelve #1 (March 2008)	
Monako the Magician	Daring Mystery Comics #1	The Marvels Project #1 (Oct. 2009)	
Moon Man	Mystic Comics #5	All-Winners Squad: Band of Heroes #2 (Sep. 2011)	
Namora	Marvel Mystery Comics #82 (May 1947)	Sub-Mariner #33 (January 1971)	Ken Bald (writer), Syd Shores (artist)
Nellie the Nurse			
Patriot	Human Torch Comics #4 (Spring 1941)	The Avengers #97 (March 1972); The Invaders #5 (March 1976)	Ray Gill (writer), Bill Everett or George Mandel (penciler)
Patsy Walker	Miss America Magazine #2 (Nov. 1944)	Fantastic Four Annual #3 (Oct. 1965)	Stuart Little (writer), Ruth Atkinson (artist)
Phantom Bullet	Daring Comics #2 (Feb. 1940)	The Marvels Project #2 (Nov. 2009)	
Phantom Reporter	Daring Mystery Comics #3	The Twelve #1 (March 2008)	
Red Raven	Red Raven Comics #1 (Aug. 1940)	X-Men #44 (May 1968)	Joe Simon (writer), Louis Cazeneuve (penciller)
Rockman	U.S.A. Comics #1 (Aug. 1941)	The Twelve #1 (March 2008)	
Silver Scorpion	Daring Mystery Comics #7 (Jan. 1941)	Invaders #2 (June 1993)	Henry Sahle
Slow-Motion Jones	U.S.A. Comics #6 (Dec. 1942)	All-Winners Squad: Band of Heroes #1 (Aug. 2011)	
Sun Girl	Sun Girl #1 (Aug. 1948)	Ant-Man: Last Days #1 (Oct. 2015)	Ken Bald
Taxi Taylor	Mystic Comics #2 (Apr. 1940)	All-Winners Squad: Band of Heroes #1 (Aug. 2011)	Unknown writer and penciler from the Harry "A" Chesler studio
Terror	Mystic Comics #5 (March 1941)	Sensational She-Hulk #15 (May 1990)	Phil Sturm (writer); Syd Shores (penciler). George Klein may have added background pencils, but that would not be a creator role.
Thin Man	Mystic Comics #4 (July 1940)	Marvel Premiere #29 (April 1976)	Klaus Nordling (penciller-inker)
Thunderer	Daring Mystery Comics #7 (April 1941)	Marvel Premiere #29 (April 1976)	
Toro	Human Torch Comics #2 (Fall 1940)	Sub-Mariner #14 (June 1969)	Carl Burgos
Vagabond	U.S.A. Comics #2 (Nov. 1941)	All-Winners Squad: Band of Heroes #3 (Oct. 2011)	
Venus	Venus #1 (Aug. 1948)	Sub-Mariner #57 (January 1973)	Ken Bald (first artist)
Victory Boys	Comedy Comics #10 (June 1942)	All-Winners Squad: Band of Heroes #1 (Aug. 2011)	
Vision	Marvel Mystery Comics #13 (Nov. 1940)	The Avengers #97 (March 1972)	Jack Kirby & Joe Simon (writers); Jack Kirby (penciller-inker)
Whizzer	U.S.A. Comics #1 (Aug. 1941)	Giant-Size Avengers #1 (Aug. 1974)	Al Avison (penciller), Al Gabriele (inker). Writer unknown.
The Witness	Mystic Comics #6 (Dec. 1941)	The Twelve #1 (March 2008)	Stan Lee (writer)
Young Allies	Young Allies Comics #1 (July 1941)	Young Allies Comics 70th Anniversary Special (August 2009)	Jack Kirby (penciller), Syd Shores (inker)
Young Avenger	U.S.A. Comics #1 (Aug. 1941)	All-Winners Squad: Band of Heroes #1 (Aug. 2011)	
