= Syd Shores =

American comic book artist (1916-1973)

- Born: Sydney Shores; 1916
- Died: June 3, 1973 (aged 56–57) New York City, U.S.
- Areas: Penciller, Inker
- Notable works: Captain America
- Awards: Inkwell Awards Joe Sinnott Hall of Fame (2023)

Sydney Shores (1916 – June 3, 1973) was an American comic book artist known for his work on Captain America both during the 1940s, in what fans and historians call the Golden Age of comic books, and during the 1960s Silver Age of comic books.

== Biography ==
=== Early life and career ===
Syd Shores began drawing in childhood, fascinated by the comic-strip art of Alex Raymond's Flash Gordon and Hal Foster's Prince Valiant. He went to graduate from Brooklyn's Pratt Institute, where he had met his wife-to-be, Selma. After working seven years at his uncle's whiskey bottling plant until it closed in 1940, he became an assistant at the studio of Selma's cousin, the comic book packager Harry "A" Chesler, working under comics artists Mac Raboy and Phil Sturm. "For months I was just a joe-boy, watching and learning and helping wherever I could. I studied Mac Raboy for hours on end — he was slow and meticulous about everything, doing maybe only a single panel of artwork a day, but it was truly beautiful work. After four months I tried my own hand at work, doing a seven-page piece called 'The Terror'. I was proud of it then, of course, but in looking back it really was a terror!"

"The Terror" still held enough promise that it saw print in Mystic Comics #5 (March 1941) from Timely Comics, the 1940s precursor of Marvel Comics, and went on to make other appearances. Timely editor Joe Simon hired Shores as the fledgling company's third employee.

Captain America Comics 128 Pages (Jan. 1942), a one-shot, 25¢ special. Cover art by Shores.

=== Golden Age of comics ===
Shores initially worked as an inker, embellishing some of the earliest pencil work of industry legend Jack Kirby, including the covers of the Simon & Kirby-created Captain America Comics #5, 7 and 9 in 1941. After the Simon & Kirby team moved on following Captain America Comics #10 (Jan. 1942), Shores and Al Avison became regular pencilers of the hit title, with one generally inking over the other, both working with writer Stan Lee. At that point, Shores received a promotion, he recalled in 1973: "When Simon and Kirby left in 1942 Stan did all the writing and was given the position of editorial director, while I was the art director, although I got called 'associate editor' in the books that were put out around then." Shores took over as regular penciller on Captain America Comics, inked by Vince Alascia, while Avison did his World War II military service. "For the time that I worked on staff for Marvel from 1940 to 1948, I worked in close association with Vince Alascia, who did practically all the inking on my pencils," Shores said in 1970. "He was used to my style and worked very well with it."

Shores also inked two of Kirby's Golden Age Vision stories, in Marvel Mystery Comics #21-22 (July-Aug. 1941); and the cover and splash page of Young Allies #1 (July 1941). Shores said, "Jack Kirby influenced my sense of dramatics. Jack Kirby influences everybody in comics, though: Before I got really started in the field it was Alex Raymond and Hal Foster, they were my gods back then, but Kirby was the most immediate influence." Shores penciled stories of the Vision and the Patriot in Marvel Mystery Comics, Major Liberty in U.S.A. Comics, and the Captain America portions of the All-Winners Squad stories in the (unhyphenated) All Winners Comics #19 and 21 (Fall and Winter 1946; there was no issue #20).

Shores was inducted into the U.S. Army in early 1944, seeing action as part of General Patton's Third Army in France and Germany, and receiving a Purple Heart for being wounded in France on 16 December 1944. After four months at a convalescent hospital in Warwick, England, he was reassigned to an engineering outfit and became part of the occupation forces in Germany. He recalled in 1970 that "after Al [Avison] left, I started pencilling [Captain America stories] from then on until the Army decided it could use my services to help win World War II. It seemed they needed a lot of men for the infantry at the time. I was called up, and so my artistic eye was used to qualify me as an expert marksman in an infantry regiment. Curiously it was the same regiment that Jack Kirby was in. We never saw each other in combat, and only recently did we find that we were in the same outfit!"

Comic-book artist Gene Colan recalled in 1999,

My first real professional start in the comic-book business began in the summer of 1946, and that is when I met Syd Shores. He was the head man in the Art Department of Marvel Comics. ... I was flying by the seat of my pants ... hoping that everything would turn out. I didn't want the seams to show but that was all part of the learning process and Syd helped me wade through. ... His realistic style, for some time, became an obsession with me. His characters looked like the real thing. Whatever he had them doing was as real to life as you could get.

=== Post-war career ===
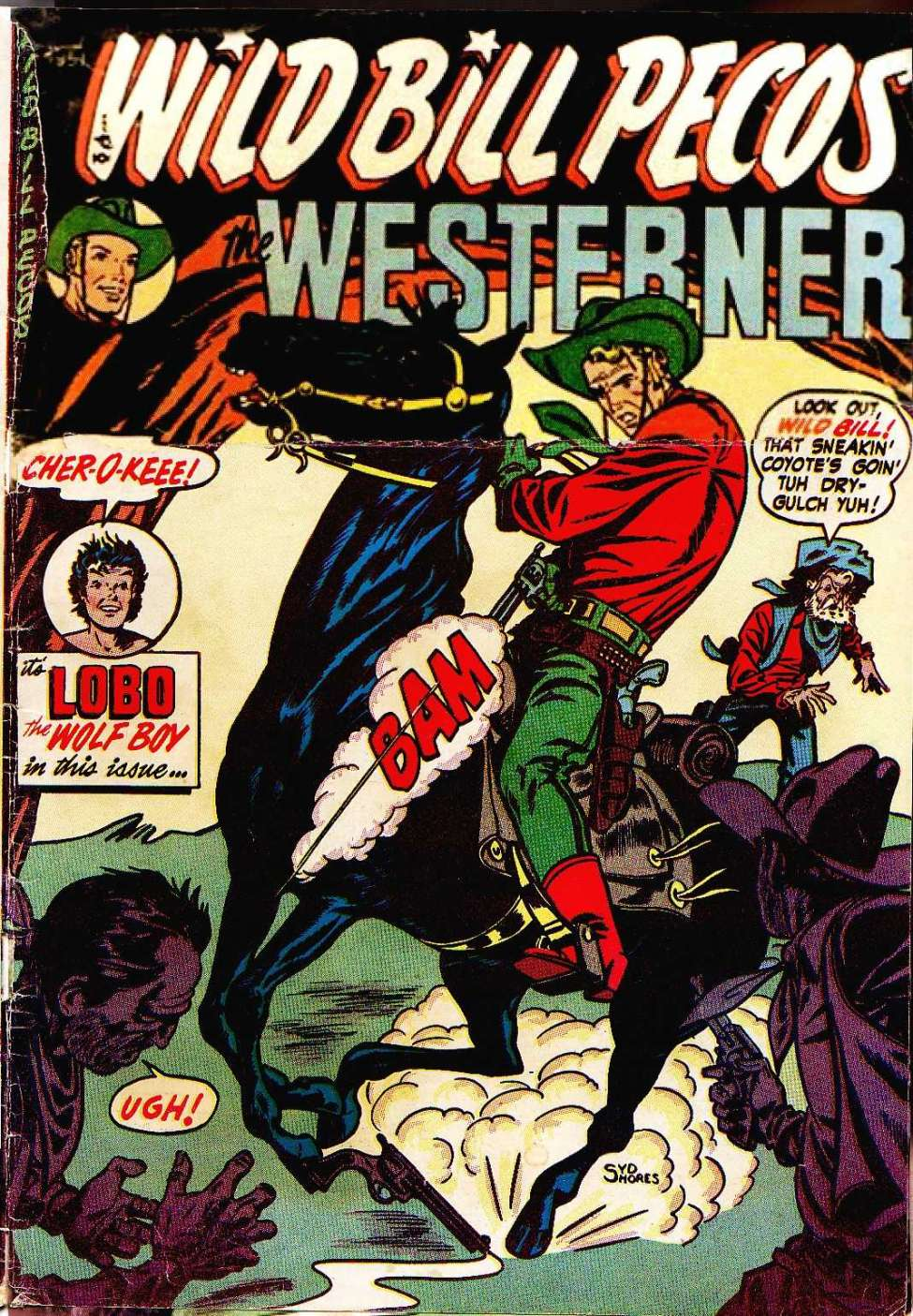
The Westerner #39 (1951), Orbit Publications. Cover art by Syd Shores

After his military discharge in January 1946, Shores returned to Timely as art director. Future Comic Book Hall of Famer Gene Colan, a Marvel mainstay from 1946 on, described Shores during this time as "a very quiet man. He would come in with a kind of very slow walk, with a cup of morning coffee in one of these spiral cups and a cigarette in the other. Big smoker. He would say hello to everybody very quietly, and sit down. He'd been in the war in Germany, and sometimes I'd try to feel him out about it. He never wanted to talk about it. Very quiet fellow, but a sweet, sweet guy, and very helpful; very unassuming".

At postwar Timely and at the company's 1950s successor, Atlas Comics, Shores was among the artists on the company's superhero stars the Human Torch and the Sub-Mariner, the Western titles The Black Rider and Kid Colt, Outlaw, the jungle series Jann of the Jungle and Jungle Action, the war comics Battle Action and Battle Brady, and many others including Blonde Phantom. Going freelance in 1948, when virtually all of Timely's staff positions were eliminated, Shores drew for Atlas, Avon, and Orbit Publications. With Mort Lawrence, who succeeded Bill Everett on The Sub-Mariner, and Norman Steinberg, another Atlas artist, Shores co-founded a comic-art studio in 1952, first in Hempstead, Long Island, and later in nearby Freeport. But with Steinberg's death in the mid-1950s and Lawrence's decision to leave the field, Shores returned to individual freelancing, adding magazine illustration to his repertoire. He said in a 1970 interview that, "In 1957, there was a recession in the comic book industry and I was forced to look elsewhere for work. I entered the magazine illustration field. I did illustrations for the men's adventure-type magazines until 1967. After things picked up again in the comic field I hastened back again to my first love, comics!" His men's-adventure work includes the covers of publisher Martin Goodman's magazines Escape to Adventure (Sept. 1964), All Man (May 1964; reprinted as cover of Man's Adventure, May 1967, and Sept. 1965); and Man's Prime (Aug. 1966).

=== Silver Age of Comics ===
Captain America #103 (July 1968). Silver Age art by Jack Kirby and Shores.

In the 1960s, Shores found a new audience at Marvel Comics, where he again inked Jack Kirby on Captain America when the character once more received a full-length title. Shores inked the premiere issue, Captain America #100 (April 1968), continuing the numbering from Tales of Suspense), inking Kirby on seven of the first 10. He also inked a run of Gene Colan's Daredevil, among other Colan work, and inked both Dick Ayers and Don Heck on the World War II war comics title Captain Savage and His Leatherneck Raiders (later titled Capt. Savage and His Battlefield Raiders), among other work.

In a rare return to penciling at Marvel, Shores drew and self-inked five anthological horror stories from 1969 to 1971 in Chamber of Darkness, Tower of Shadows, Creatures on the Loose and Monsters on the Prowl, as well as Gerry Conway's adaptation of Harlan Ellison's "Delusions for a Dragon Slayer" in Chamber of Chills #1 (Nov. 1972). Additionally, Shores penciled and occasionally self-inked several Western stories, including the premiere of the feature "Tales of Fort Rango" in Western Gunfighters #1 (Aug. 1970); The Gunhawks #1-2 & 4-5 (Oct.-Dec.1972, April–June 1973); and the Native American hero Red Wolf in Marvel Spotlight #1 (Nov. 1971) and Red Wolf #1-8 (May 1972 - July 1973). Shores also penciled the Skywald Publications Western The Bravados #1 (Aug. 1971).

He likewise penciled a handful of black-and-white horror-comics magazine stories, such as "Blood Thirst!" in Major Publications' Web of Horror #1 (Dec. 1969) and "Strangers!" in #3 (April 1970); and for Warren Publishing, "Army of the Walking Dead" in Creepy #35 (Sept. 1970) and "King Keller" in #37 (Jan. 1971).

=== Later life and death ===
Some of Shores' last comics work was inking Tom Sutton and Jim Mooney on, respectively Marvel's Ghost Rider #1-2 (Sept.-Oct. 1973). He additionally penciled part of the eight-page story "Voodoo War" for Marvel's black-and-white horror-comics magazine Tales of the Zombie #5 (May 1974) before dying of a heart seizure. He was survived by his wife and their two daughters.

== Legacy ==
The survey "The 20 Greatest Inkers of American Comic Books" placed Shores at #11, saying he "evidenced a unique and singular inking style, one perhaps only vaguely approximated by the great Bill Everett. Both had bold but rough-hewn lines and illustrative, photorealistic brushwork which gave the pages a beautiful, organic look. . . ."

== Awards ==
In 2023, Shores was inducted into the Inkwell Awards Joe Sinnott Hall of Fame.
