= List of comics publishing companies =

This list of comics publishing companies lists companies, specifically publishing companies who primarily publish comics. Comic art is an art medium used to present ideas or stories via images. The images are usually arranged in panels in a sequence that conveys the story. Sounds are expressed using speech balloons and onomatopoeia. European comics have existed since 1837, when Swiss artist Rodolphe Töpffer published Histoire de Mr. Vieux Bois. The oldest comic publishing company on this list is the now-defunct book publishing company, David McKay Publications that was founded in 1882 and published comics from 1935 to 1950. Most comic publishing companies were established in the United States, where comics became popular in the middle of the twentieth century.

== Publishers ==
Comics publishing companies
Name	Country	Active		Notes
12 bis	France	2008	Active	
12-Gauge Comics	US	2004	Active	A former imprint of Image Comics. Became fully independent as of 2009. Titles: Anti, The Boondock Saints: In Nomine Patris, ICE: Bayou Blackout, ICE: Critical Mass, Loose Ends, Luke McBain, Magus, Narco, R.P.M., The Ride: Southern Gothic, Sherwood, Texas
1First Comics	US	1982	Active	Relaunched in 2011; a.k.a. First Comics
451 Media Group	US	2015	Active	Subdivision of Michael Bay's 451 Interactive Publishing. Titles: Bad Moon Rising (2015), Exmortis, Humbug, Nvrlnd, Self Storage, Six, Stained, Sunflower
Aardvark-Vanaheim	Canada	1977	Active	Most titles moved to Renegade Press in 1985
Abacus Comics	US	2006	Active	Bought Alias Comics in 2007
About Comics	US	1998	Active	Titles: Angels Everywhere!, Bootsie's War Years, Crossfire, DNAgents, The Factor, The Little Friar, Our Little Nuns, Stewart the Rat, Vale of Dears, Welcome to Heaven, Dr. Franklin
Abrams ComicArts	US	2009	Active	An imprint of Abrams Books Titles: The Age of Selfishness: Ayn Rand, Morality, and the Financial Crisis, The Bomb: The Weapon That Changed the World, Climate Changed: A Personal Journey through the Science, Economix, Fire on the Water, Guantanamo Voices, My Friend Dahmer, The Night Eaters, Sing No Evil, Will Eisner: Champion of the Graphic Novel
AC Comics	US	1969	Active	Former Paragon Publications until 1982; former Americomics until 1984 Titles: Amazon Warriors, Barbarians and Beauties, Crimebuster (1995), Dragonfly, Femforce, Heroine Heaven, Jungle Girls, Miss Masque, Reddevil, The Sword of Zorro (2002)
Ace Comics	US	1940	1956	Imprints: A.A. Wyn (Inc.), Ace Books, Inc., Ace Magazines, Inc., Ace Periodicals, Inc., Ace Publications (Inc.), Current Books, Inc., Humor Publications, Inc., Junior Books, Inc., Periodical House, Inc., Unity Publishing Corp. Titles: Banner Comics, The Beyond, Challenge of the Unknown, Four Favorites, Four Teeners, Hand of Fate, Lightning Comics, Our Flag Comics, Penalty, Sure-Fire Comics
Acme Press	UK	1986	2005	Also known as ACME Press and Acme Comics
Action Lab Comics	US	2010	Active	Comics published under imprint: Action Lab Comics Signature Series. Titles: Amerikarate, Brigands, Cold Blood Samurai, Danger Doll Squad, Fight Like a Girl, Going to the Chapel, Princeless, Shinobi: Ninja Princess, Spencer & Locke, Zoe Dare
AdHouse Books	US	2002	Active	Titles: American Barbarian, Comrade Kill, Driven by Lemons, Johnny Hiro, The Oven, Salamander Dream, The Secret Voice, Street Angel, Tiger!Tiger!Tiger!, Ur
Adult Comics	US	1992	1992	Adult-comics imprint of Personality Comics. Titles: Bad Girls; Female Fantasies
Adventure Publications	US	1986	1993	Acquired by Malibu Comics in 1989, which was bought by Marvel in 1994. Titles: The Adventurers, Adventurers Book II, Death Hawk, Elf Warrior, NetherWorlds, Ninja Elite, Star Rangers, Warriors
Aftershock Comics	US	2015	2022	AfterShock Comics Files Chapter 11 Bankruptcy Titles: Alters, Bad Reception, Clankillers, Dead Day, Eleanor and the Egret, Girls of Dimension 13, Her Infernal Descent, Midnight Rose, Unholy Grail, You Are Obsolete
Aida-Zee Comics	US	1990	1997	Titles included Aida-Zee, Paro-Dee, Behold 3-D
Aircel Comics	Canada	1985	1994	Bought out by Malibu Comics in 1991, which was bought by Marvel in 1994
AiT/Planet Lar	US	1999	Active	Titles: Abel, Bad Mojo, Colonia, The Couriers, Demo, Hench, Jax Epoch and the Quicken Forbidden (trade paperbacks), Planet of the Capes, Switchblade Honey, Tales from Fish Camp
Ajax-Farrell	US	1951	1958	see: Farrell Comic Group Titles: Black Cobra, Captain Jet, Dear Heart, G.I. in Battle, Fantastic Comics, Men in Action, The Rider, Strange Fantasy, Vooda, War Stories
Akita Shoten	Japan	1948	Active	Publishes mostly manga-titles
Alias Enterprises	US	2005	2007	Published comics as Alias Comics; imprint: Cross Culture. Alias Comics was sold to Abacus Comics and Cross Culture was bought by LAMP PoST Publications in 2007. Titles: The Dreamland Chronicles (2005), Elsinore, Hyper-Actives, Imperial Dragons, Judo Girl (2006), Lions, Tigers and Bears (2005), Lullaby, Six-Gun Samurai, Valkyries, Yenny
All-American Publications	US	1939	1946	Bought out by National Periodicals (DC Comics) in 1946
All Star DC Comics	US	2005	2008	Defunct imprint of DC Comics. Titles: All-Star Superman; All Star Batman and Robin the Boy Wonder
Alternative Comics	US	1993	Active	Shut down in 2008, resumed publishing in 2012. Titles: 9-11: Emergency Relief; The Cute Manifesto; Magic Whistle
Amalgam Comics	US	1996	1997	Shared Imprint by DC Comics and Marvel Comics. Defunct in 1997, published reprints in 2003, 2004, and 2024
Amazing Comics	US	1987	1987	Spearheaded by David Campiti; one of the five publishing entities set up by Scott Mitchell Rosenberg/Sunrise Distribution. Some titles were affiliated with Pied Piper Comics. Titles: Barney the Invisible Turtle, Ex-Mutants, Jack Frost
American Comics Group	US	1943	1967	Began in 1943 as Creston Publishing
America's Best Comics	US	1999	2005	Imprint of WildStorm, altogether sold to DC Comics. Titles: The League of Extraordinary Gentlemen, Volume One, The League of Extraordinary Gentlemen, Volume II, The League of Extraordinary Gentlemen: Black Dossier, Promethea, Smax, Terra Obscura, Tom Strong, Tomorrow Stories, Top 10
Americomics	US	1982	1984	Former Paragon Publications from 1969 to 1982; becomes AC Comics in 1984
Anglo-American Publishing	Canada	1941	1951	
Ankama Editions	France	2001	Active	Comics publishing division of Ankama Games
Antarctic Press	US	1984	Active	Titles: Chesty Sanchez, Gold Digger, Ninja High School, Warrior Nun Areala
Apex Novelties	US	1968	1979	Original publisher of R. Crumb's Zap Comix
Apple Comics	US	1986	1994	Began as Imprint of WaRP Graphics. Also known as Apple Press. Imprint: Forbidden Fruit
Approbation Comics	US	1992	Active	
Arcana Studio	Canada	2004	Active	Titles: Clockwork Girl; Kade; Ezra
Archaia Studios Press	US	2002	Active	Bought by Kunoichi Inc. in 2008. Titles: Mouse Guard
Archie Adventure Comics	US	1959	1962	Archie Comics superhero imprint. Titles: Adventures of The Fly; Adventures of the Jaguar, Shadow
Archie Comic Publications	US	1939	Active	Founded as MLJ Magazines, changed to Archie Comic Publications in 1951. Imprints (all currently defunct): Archie Adventure Comics; Belmont Books, Radio Comics (under Mighty Comics); Red Circle Comics; Spectrum Comics
Arrow Comics	US	1985	Active	Arrow Comics shut down two times; In 1989, returning in 1993, and in 2000, returning in 2008. Imprint: Arrow Manga. Titles: Tales From The Aniverse; Spank the Monkey; The Dead
Asahi Sonorama	Japan	1959	Active	
ASCII Media Works	Japan	2008	Active	
Aspen MLT	US	2003	Active	Titles: Aspen, Executive Assistant Iris, Fathom (2003 – present), The Iron Saint, Lady Mechanika, Shrugged, Soulfire
L'Association	France	1990	Active	
Asuka	France	2004	2010	Merged with Kazé in 2010
Atlas Comics	US	1951	1957	Evolved into Marvel Comics
Atlas/Seaboard Comics	US	1974	1975	Relaunched in association with Ardden Entertainment in 2010. Titles: Grim Ghost, Phoenix, Scorpion
Atomeka Press	UK	1988; 2004	1997; 2005	
Avatar Press	US	1996		Dystopian comics. Titles: Absolution, Alan Moore's The Courtyard, Black Summer, God Is Dead, No Hero, Pandora, Providence, Supergod, The Unfunnies, Über
Avon Comics	US	1945	1956	
AWA Studios	US	2019	Active	Artists, Writers & Artisans
Awesome Comics	US	1997	2000	Also known as Awesome Entertainment and Awesome-Hyperwerks
Axis Comics	US	1994	1994	
Azteca Productions	US	1993		
Bedside Press	Canada	2014	2019	Hope Nicholson Closes Bedside Press Following Sexual Assault Admission
Bell Features	Canada	1939	1953	a.k.a. Commercial Signs of Canada
Belmont Books	US	1960	1971	Paperback-book publishing imprint of Archie Comics, also published reprinted material from Radio Comics. Merged with Tower Books forming Belmont Tower in 1971. Ceased publishing 1980
Beyond Comics	US	1997	Active	Publications: "Justice", "Gekido Vs. Code Name: Justice", "Gekido", & "Ravedactyl" Also known as BeyondComics.TV
Big Bang Comics	US	1994		Established in 1994 as imprint of Caliber Press; became independent publisher in 2006
Black Eye Productions	Canada	1992	1998	
Blackthorne Publishing	US	1985	1989	
Blue Comics	Brazil	2006	Active	
Blue Juice Comics	US	2012	Active	
Boneyard Press	US	1991	Active	Currently publishing online comics (Vein Water).
Bongo Comics	US	1993	2018	
Boom! Studios	US	2005	Active	
Boundless Comics	US	2010	Active	Imprint of Avatar Press, created solely for publication of Lady Death, bought from CrossGen Entertainment (who themselves bought the rights to Lady Death from defunct Chaos! Comics). Notable for comics in which the contents have no censorship in terms of violence, nudity, sex, and swearing. Titles: Belladonna (2015), Ember, Hellina, Jungle Fantasy, Lady Death, Lookers, Threshold: Allure, UnHoly, War Goddess, Webwitch (2015)
BroadSword Comics	US	1999		
Broadway Comics	US	1995	1996	
Bubble Comics	Russia	2011	Active	
Burlyman Entertainment	US	2003	Active	Founded by The Wachowskis.
Byron Preiss Visual Publications	US	1974	2006	
Bluewater Productions	US	2007		Titles: Back to Mysterious Island, Black Scorpion, Flying Saucers Vs. the Earth, Insane Jane: The Avenging Star, Isis, Sinbad: Rogue of Mars, Space Women Beyond the Stratosphere, Tenth Muse (June 2007 series; 2013 series), Violet Rose, Wrath of the Titans
Caliber Comics	US	1989	2000	
Calvary Comics	US	2006		
Capital Comics	US	1981	1984	Went bankrupt, all titles acquired by First Comics. Titles: Badger (September 1983 – April 1984), Nexus (1981 – October 1982, May 1983 – March 1984), Whisper (December 1983 – March 1984)
Cardal Publishing	UK		1951	
Carlsen Comics	Germany	1967	Active	Comic publishing imprint of Carlsen Verlag, established in 1953, started publishing comics in 1967; imprints: Edition ComicArt, B&L (bought 2002, since 2006 part of Carlsen Cartoon und Humor), Chicken House Deutschland (joint-venture with The Chicken House
Cartoon Books	US	1991	Active	
Casterman	Belgium	1934	Active	Established in 1780, began publishing comics in 1934
Celebrity Comics	US	1992	1993	Imprint of Personality Comics
Centaur Publications	US	1938	1942	
Chaos! Comics	US	1992	2002	First publishing in 1993. All characters except Lady Death were first bought by comic retailer Tales of Wonder, then sold to Devil's Due Publishing, and after the demise of Devil's Due Publishing finally went to Dynamite Entertainment. Rights to Lady Death were first sold to CrossGen Entertainment, and went, after Crossgen's demise, to Chaos! Comics founder Brian Pulido and Avatar Press under its own imprint Boundless Comics
Charlton Comics	US	1946	1986	
Cinebook	UK	?	Active	
Class Comics	Canada	1995		Publishes erotic gay comics.
Classical Comics	UK	2007		
Claypool Comics	US	1993	2006	
Cliffhanger	US	1998	2004	Absorbed first into Homage, itself then absorbed Wildstorm Signature Series
CMX	US	2004	2010	
Coamix	Japan	2000		
Coconino Press	Italy	2000	Active	
Columbia Comics	US	1940	1949	
Comely Comix	Canada	1975	2005	Known for Captain Canuck
Comic Chronicles	US		1993	Imprint of Personality Comics
Comic Media	US	1952	1954	
Comico Comics	US	1982	1997	Titles: Elementals, Evangeline, Grendel, Mage
Comics' Greatest World	US	1993	2000	Dark Horse Comics superhero imprint. Changed name to Dark Horse Heroes in 1995
Comics Interview Group	US	1985	1989	Imprint of Fictioneer Books
ComicsOne	US	1999	2005	Some titles were taken over by DrMaster
Com.x	UK	2000		
Conrad	Brazil	1993	Defunct	
Continuity Comics	US	1984	1994	Also known as Continuity Publishing; still exists as Neal Adams Studios, no longer publishing comics. Titles: Armor, Bucky O'Hare, Captain Power and the Soldiers of the Future, Crazyman, Cyberrad, Echo of Futurepast, Hybrids, Hybrids: The Origin, Megalith, Ms. Mystic, The Revengers Featuring Megalith, Samuree, Shaman, Toyboy, Urth 4, Valeria, She-Bat, Zero Patrol
Continüm Comics	US	1989	1994	
Core Magazine	Japan	1985	Active	
Crestwood Publications	US	1943	1963	Later known as Prize Comics
CrossGen	US	1998	2004	Former imprint: Code 6. Bought by Walt Disney in 2004. Became an Imprint of Marvel Comics in 2010, first publishing under Marvel Comics in 2011 Titles: Abadazad, Sigil, Sojourn, Ruse
Crusade Comics	US	1994	2002	
Curtis Magazines	US	1971	1980	Marvel Comics imprint. Published black-and-white comics magazines
Curtis Publishing Company	US	1891	Active	
Dabel Brothers Productions	US	2001	2009	
Dargaud	France	1943	Active	
Dark Horse Comics	US	1986	Active	Active imprints: Dark Horse Manga, M Press ("diverse literary fiction and non-fiction prose for authors with a unique voice")., Sequential Pulp Comics. Discontinued imprints: Comics' Greatest World later renamed Dark Horse Heroes (DH's shared superheroes universe), Legend (creator-owned projects, originally by Miller and Byrne), and Maverick (creator-owned projects, follow-up to Legend)
Dark Horse Manga	US	1992	Active	Dark Horse Comics manga-imprint
David McKay Publications (also: David McKay Company)	US	1882	1986	Published comics from 1931 to 1950; bought out by Random House in 1986
DC Comics	US	1934	Active	Founded as National Allied Publications. Titles: Aquaman, Batman, The Flash, Green Arrow, Green Lantern, Justice League, Martian Manhunter, Superman, Teen Titans, Wonder Woman
D. C. Thomson & Co. Ltd	UK	1905	Active	Publishers of The Beano and The Dandy
Defiant Comics	US	1992	1995	Imprint of Enlightened Entertainment Partners, LP
Delcourt	France	1986	Active	
Dell Comics	US	1929	1973	
Deluxe Comics	US	1984	1986	
Desperado Publishing	US	2004	2012	Began as an imprint of Image Comics. Became independent in 2007. Partnered with IDW Publishing from early 2010 to 2012. Titles: The Atheist, Cherubs! (2007), Deadworld (2007-2008, 2010), Detectives Inc. (2008), Flaming Carrot Comics (2004-2006), Monsterpocalypse, Negative Burn (#12-#21), Sabre (2008), Starchild (2007), Untouchables (2006)
Devil's Due Publishing	US	1999	Active	Titles: Barack the Barbarian, Breakdown, Cannon Busters, Drafted, G.I. Joe: A Real American Hero, Hack/Slash, Micronauts (2004), Sheena, Queen of the Jungle (2007-2008), Xombie: Reanimated, Yumiko: Curse of the Merch Girl
Dhaka Comics	Bangladesh	2013	Active	
Disney Comics	US	1990	1993	
Dragon Lady Press	Canada	1985	1988	
Drawn & Quarterly	Canada	1990	Active	
Dreamwave Productions	Canada	1996	2005	Titles: Arkanium, Dark Minds, Echo, Fate of the Blade, Limbo City, NecroWar, Neon Cyber, Sandscape, Shidima, Transformers, Warlands
DrMaster	US	2004	2008	Published some titles from ComicsOne when they went out of business
DSTLRY	US	2023	Active	
Dupuis	Belgium	1922	Active	
Dynamite Entertainment	US	2005	Active	
Eastern Color Printing	US	1933	1955	Continued as a printer until 2002
EC Comics	US	1944	1956	Continued to publish Mad magazine
Eclipse Comics	US	1978	1993	Imprint: Independent Comics Group
Eerie Publications	US	1966	1981	Myron Fass black-and-white horror comics magazine imprint
eigoMANGA	US	2000	Active	
Elliot Publishing	US	1940	1945	Published comics from 1944 - 1945; imprint: Gilberton (until 1942)
Elvifrance	France	1970	1992	
Epic Comics (also: Epic Comics Group)	US	1982; 1995; 2003	1994; 1996; 2011	Imprint of Marvel Comics, defunct. Titles: Alien Legion, Atomic Age, The Black Dragon, Dreadstar (#1 – #26), Sisterhood of Steel, Swords of the Swashbucklers
Eternity Comics	US	1986	1994	Originally spearheaded by Brian Marshall; one of five publishers set up by Scott Mitchell Rosenberg/Sunrise Distribution; became a Malibu Comics imprint in 1988
Event Comics	US	1994	1999	Became Marvel Knights and was closed in 1998, last publishing in 1999
Evil Ink Comics	US	2004		
Extreme Studios	US	1997	2000	Titles: Bloodstrike (#3-#7), Brigade (#0, #3-#7), Prophet (1993 series, #1-#3), Supreme (#6-#12), Troll (December 1993), Violator vs. Badrock, Youngblood (1996 series), Youngblood: Strikefile (#4)
FAKKU	US	2006	Active	
Fangoria Comics	US	2007	2007	Fangoria Entertainment imprint
FantaCo Enterprises	US	1980	1998	
Fantagor Press	US	1986	1994	Imprint of cartoonist Richard Corben
Fantagraphics	US	1976	Active	
Fantasy Flight Publications		1995	1996	Published translated European comics; still in business as games publisher Fantasy Flight Games
Farrell Comic Group	US	1951	1958	Imprints: America's Best, Ajax Publications, Ajax-Farrell, Decker Publications, Red Top Comics, Steinway Comics and World Famous; successor to Farrell Publications
Farrell Publications	US	1940	1948	Imprints: American Feature Syndicate, Four Star Publications and Kiddie Kapers Company. Was followed by Farrell Comic Group
Fawcett Comics	US	1939; 1969	1953; 1980	
Fiction House	US	1938	1954	
Finix Comics	Germany	2007	Active	Registered club open to any comic-fan with the goal to continue prematurly cancelled comic-series. First publishing in 2008. Imprint: Edition Solitaire
First Comics	US	1982	Active	Relaunched in 2011; a/k/a and see 1First Comics. Titles: American Flagg!, Badger (#5 – #70), Dreadstar (#27 – #64), Dynamo Joe, Grimjack, Jon Sable, Freelance, Nexus (#7 – #80), Sensei, Shatter, Whisper (June 1986 – June 1990)
Fox Atomic Comics	US	2006	2009	Comics publishing imprint of Fox Atomic, itself an imprint of 20th Century Fox
Fox Feature Syndicate	US	1939	1951	
Frémok	France; Belgium	2002		
Futabasha	Japan	1948	Active	
Future Comics	US	2002	2004	
Gangan Comics	Japan	1991	Active	Imprint of Enix until its merger into Square Enix in 2003.
Gentosha	Japan	1993	Active	
Gestalt Publishing	Australia	2005		
Ghost Machine	US	2023	Active	Imprint of Image Comics. Titles: Geiger, Hornsby & Halo, Hyde Street, It Happened on Hyde Street: Devour, Redcoat, The Rocketfellers, Rook: Exodus
Giant Generator	US	2017	Active	Imprint of Image Comics. Titles: Grommets, The Holy Roller, Napalm Lullaby, The Sacrificers, The Tin Can Society
Gladstone Comics	US	1986	1999	
Glénat	France	1972	Active	
Gold Key Comics	US	1962	1984	Also known as Whitman Comics
Gorilla Comics	US	1999	2000	Short-lived imprint of Image Comics. Titles: Crimson Plague, Empire (#1-#2), Section Zero, ShockRockets, Superstar: As Seen on TV, Tellos (#8-#10)
Hakusensha	Japan	1973	Active	
Hall of Heroes	US	1993	1999	
Harrier Comics	UK	1984	1989	
Harris Comics	US	1985	2008	Published Vampirella
Harvey Comics	US	1939	1994	Comics publisher, founded as Worth Carnahan Comics, then Greenwald Publications
Hell Comics	US	1971	1972	Published Air Pirates Funnies
Hexagon Comics	France	1950	Active	Successor to Editions Lug, which was succeeded by Semic S.A. which folded in 2003. Titles: Strangers, Hexagon Classics
Highbrow Entertainment	US	1994	Active	Imprint of Image Comics. Titles: Dart, Freak Force, Savage Dragon, SuperPatriot, Teenage Mutant Ninja Turtles (1996-1999), Vanguard
Highwater Books	US	1997	2004	
Hillborough Studios	Canada	1941	1942	Most of the staff moved to Bell Features
Hillman Periodicals	US	1948	1953	
Holyoke Publishing	US	1940	1946	Imprints: Bilbara Publishing, Continental Publishing, Narrative Publishers
Homage	US	1995	2004	WildStorm Productions imprint, acquired by DC Comics in 1998, absorbed into Wildstorm Signature Series in 2004
Houbunsha	Japan	1950	Active	
Humanoids Publishing	US	1999		
Humor Comics	US	1992	1993	Imprint of Personality Comics
Humor Publications/ Current Books	US	1944	1948	Ace Magazines imprint.
Icon	US	2004		
Idaho Comics Group	US	2014	Active	Publishes Tarzan and the Comics of Idaho and Idaho Comics
IDW Publishing	US	1999	Active	Titles: 30 Days of Night, Archangel, Big Hero 6: The Series, Chiaroscuro, Dungeons & Dragons, FX, G.I. Joe, Judge Dredd, Teenage Mutant Ninja Turtles, Transformers
I. W. Publications	US	1958	1964	Also known as Super Comics
iBooks	US	2003	2005	Published by Byron Preiss
Image Comics	US	1992	Active	Titles: Allegra, Bone (#21-#27), Little Red Hot, The Maxx, Monstress, Radiant Black, Saga, Stray Dogs, Violent Messiahs, Wayward
Imperial Comics	US	1986	1987	Spearheaded by Brian Marshall; one of five publishers established by Scott Mitchell Rosenberg/Sunrise Distribution (and later absorbed by Malibu/Eternity).
Imperium Comics	US			
Innovation Comics	US	1988	1993	
Insomnia Publications	UK	2006	2010	
JBC	Japan; Brazil	1992	Active	
JC Comics	US	1981	Active	Also known as JC Productions; still in existence, just not publishing since 1984
Jitsugyo no Nihon Sha	Japan	1897	Active	
Johnny DC	US	2004	Active	All-ages imprint of DC Comics
Kadokawa Shoten	Japan	1945	Active	
Kami	France		2010	
Kana	France	1996	Active	
Kazé	France	1994	2022	Parent company was Viz Media Europe until 2022 when it was acquired and merged with Crunchyroll
King Comics	US	1966	1967	Connected with King Features Syndicate; most titles were picked up from Gold Key Comics and later acquired by Charlton Comics
Ki-oon	France	2003		
Kitchen Sink Press	US	1970	1999	Bought by Ocean Capital Corp. on May 24, 1994
Kobunsha	Japan	1945	Active	
Kodansha	Japan	1909	Active	
Koyama Press	Canada	2007		
Laizen Comics	US	2009	Active	
La Pastèque	Canada	1998	Active	
Last Gasp; Comix & Stories	US	1970	Active	
Legend	US	1994	1998	Defunct Dark Horse Comics imprint for creator-owned materials; followed by Maverick
Le Lombard	Belgium	1946	Active	
Les 400 coups	Canada	1994	Active	
Les Humanoïdes Associés	France	1974	Active	
Lev Gleason Publications	US	1939	1955	Also known as Comic House Publications
Lightning Comics	US	1967	1967	
Lightning Comics	US	1993	1997	
Liquid Comics	India	2008	Active	Former Virgin Comics
L. Miller & Son, Ltd.	UK	1943	1966	
Lodestone Comics		1985	1986	
Los Angeles Comic Book Company	US	1971	1974	
Lucha Comics	Canada	2013	Active	An imprint of The Shooting Star Press.
Ludovico Technique LLC	US			
Magazine Enterprises	US	1943	1958	
Mad Cave Studios	United States	2014	Active	
Mag Garden	Japan	2001	Active	
Mainline Publications	US	1953	1956	
Malibu Comics	US	1986	1994	One of five publishers set up by Scott Mitchell Rosenberg/Sunrise Distribution. Bought by Marvel Comics, currently dormant. Imprints: Adventure Comics, Aircel Comics, Bravura, Eternity Comics, Genesis, Protectors Universe, Ultraverse (moved to Marvel)
Mam Tor Publishing	UK	2004		
Maple Leaf Publishing	Canada	1941	Defunct	
Markosia	UK	2005		
Marvel Comics	US	1939	Active	Founded as Timely Comics, later Atlas Comics. Titles: Avengers, Captain America, Daredevil, Deadpool, Fantastic Four, The Incredible Hulk, Iron Man, Spider-Man, Thor, Uncanny X-Men
Marvel Adventures	US	2005	2012	former Marvel Age; all-ages imprint of Marvel Comics ("Marvel Kids")
Marvel Age	US	2003	2005	All-ages imprint of Marvel Comics ("Marvel Kids"), picked up titles from Tsunami; became Marvel Adventures
Maverick	US	1999	2002	Dark Horse Comics imprint for creator-owned materials, follow-up to Legend
Max Comics (MAX)	US	2001	Active	Mature-reader imprint of Marvel Comics
Media Factory	Japan	1986	Active	
Mighty Comics	US	1965	1967	Archie Comics named Mighty Comics Group for housing the Super-hero imprint Radio Comics. See: Radio Comics
Milestone Media	US	1993	1997	Merged with main DC line.
Millarworld	US	2010	Active	Former imprint of Image Comics. Titles: Big Game, Empress, Jupiter's Legacy, Kick-Ass, Nemesis, Prodigy, Superior, The Magic Order, Wanted, War Heroes
Mille-Îles	Canada	1989	Active	
Millennium Publications	US	1990	1998	Imprint: Modern Comics (1997–2000)
Mirage Studios	US	1983	2021	Titles: Teenage Mutant Ninja Turtles
M. F. Enterprises	US	1966	1967	
MLJ Magazines	US	1939	1951	Became Archie Comic Publications in 1951
Mojo Press	US	1994	1999	Titles: Weird Business; Red Range; Atomic Chili
Moonstone Books	US	1995	Active	
M Press	US	2004	Active	Dark Horse Comics imprint for "diverse literary fiction and non-fiction prose for authors with a unique voice"
MU Press	US	1990	2006	Imprint: AEON Publishing
NBM Publishing	US	1976	Active	
NS Editora	BR	2001	Active	Brazilian publisher that publishes comic books under the label Geektopia
Standard Comics	US	1939	1956	Also known as Nedor, Pines, Better, and Thrilling
New England Comics	US			
New Sirius Productions		1986	1986	Comics line called Prelude Graphics
Nihon Bungeisha	Japan	1959	Active	
Noble Comics		1981	1983	
Novelty Press	US	1940	1949	
NOW Comics	US	1985	2005	
Ohzora Publishing	Japan	1990	Active	
Ominous Press	US	1994	1994	Bart Sears's short lived self-publishing line
Oni Press	US	1997	Active	
Oog & Blik	Netherlands	1985	Active	
Orbit Publications	US	1945	1953	Also known as Orbit Comics
O.W. Comics	US	1945	1946	Also known as Oxton & Woolfolk Comics. Titles: Mad Hatter
Pacific Comics	US	1981	1984	
Panaramic Entertainment	Nigeria	2007	Active	
Paradox Press	US	1993	2001	Formerly Piranha Press
Paragon Publications	US	1969	1982	Founded 1969 (first release in 1970); becomes Americomics in 1982
Personality Comics	US	1991	1993	Imprints: Adult Comics, Celebrity Comics, Comic Chronicles, Cutting Edge Productions, Friendly Comics, Humor Comics, Real Life Comics, Spoof Comics, Sports Comics
Pied Piper Comics	US	1986	1988	De facto successor to Wonder Comics
Pika Édition	France	1999		
Pines Comics	US	1956	1959	Successor to Nedor Comics
Piranha Press	US	1989	1994	A DC Comics imprint. Later became Paradox Press
Print Mint	US	1968	1978	
Prism Comics	US	2003		
Quality Comics	US	1939	1956	
Radical Comics	US	2007		
Radio Comics	US	1965	1967	Superhero imprint of Archie Comics (labelled as imprint of Mighty Comics Group). See: Mighty Comics
Radio Comix	US	1996		
Raj Comics	India	1985	Active	
Real Life Comics	US		1993	Imprint of Personality Comics
Reasonably Priced Comics	US	2009	Active	
Rebellion Developments	UK	1991	Active	Started publishing comics in 2000 when they purchased 2000 AD. Now also owns the former back catalogue of Fleetway.
Red 5 Comics	Canada	2007		
Red Circle Comics	US	1973	1985	Archie Comics superhero-imprint
Red Giant Entertainment	US	2005	Active	Publishes comics and graphic novels. Some titles include: Banzai Girl, Duel Identity, Exposure, Jade Warriors, Journey To Magika, Last Blood, Medusa's Daughter, Monster Isle by Larry Hama, Pandora's Blogs, Sore Thumbs, Tesla, Wayward Sons, Wayward Sons: Legends
Renegade Press	US	1985	1989	Started with Aardvark-Vanaheim titles, except for Cerebus
Re-Visionary Press		1994	2000	Imprint: Carnal Comics (acquired from Revolutionary Comics)
Revolutionary Comics	US	1989	1994	Imprint: Carnal Comics (later acquired by Re-Visionary Press and then Opus Graphics)
Rip Off Press	US	1969	Active	
Robot Comics	Spain	2009		
Rolf Kauka Comics	Germany	1951	Active	Sold to IPC Media and VNU in 1973; bought back by founder in 1979; became Promedia, Inc. in 1982; became Kauka Promedia in 2002; became Rolf Kauka Comics in 2008
Rough Cut Comics	Scotland	1999	Active	First publishing in 2001. Titles: Freedom Collective, Society, The Surgeon
Rural Home	US	1945	1945	Owned by Enwil. Also published under Rural Home Publishing Co. and Rural Home Publications. Titles: Cannonball Comics, Eagle Comics, Red Circle Comics
Scattered Comics	US	1991	Active	Titles: "Blank", "Blinth", "Blonde Assassin", "Caffeine Poisoned", "Comics Vs. Manga", "Damage Inc.", "Dr. Dream", "Forgotten Tales", "Genisis", "Inky and his Magic Eraser", "Lylith & Mara", "Movie Massacre Magazine", "Panda Days", "Scattered", "Shadow Hunters"
Seoulmunhwasa	South Korea			
Sequential Pulp Comics		2011	Active	Dark Horse Comics imprint
Seven Seas Entertainment	US	2004		
ShadowLine	US	1993	Active	An imprint of Image Comics. Titles: After the Cape, Bomb Queen, Cowboy Ninja Viking, Intimidators, Lazarus, Morning Glories, The Pact (comics), Rat Queens, Sam Noir, Ward of the State
Shanda Fantasy Arts				
Shinshokan	Japan	1961		
Shinchosha	Japan	1896	Active	
Shodensha	Japan	1970	Active	
Shogakukan	Japan	1922	Active	
Shōnen Gahōsha	Japan	1945		
Shueisha	Japan	1925	Active	
Sirius Comics	US	1985	1986	
Sirius Entertainment	US	1994	2005	
Skybound Entertainment	US	2010	Active	An imprint of Image Comics. Titles: Birthright, Fire Power, Ghosted, Invincible, Manifest Destiny, Oblivion Song, Outcast by Kirkman and Azaceta, Super Dinosaur, Thief of Thieves, The Walking Dead
Skywald Publications	US	1970	1975	
Slave Labor Graphics	US	1986	Active	
Soleil Productions	France	1989	Active	Founded as Librairie Bédulle
Solson Publications	US	1986	1987	
Spark Publications	US	1944	1946	
Spectrum Comics	US	1983	1984	
Spectrum Comics	US			Imprint of Archie Comics; defunct
Spilt Ink	Canada	2004	Active	The butique digital and print ready inprint of comics creator and artist Salgood Sam.
Spire Christian Comics	US	1972	1988	Published original comics from 1972–1988
Spoof Comics	US	1992	1993	Imprint of Personality Comics
Sports Comics	US		1993	Imprint of Personality Comics
Spotlight Comics	US	1986	1987	Published Mighty Mouse and Underdog comics; declared bankruptcy in 1989
St. John Publications	US	1947	1958	
Stanley Publications		1966	1971	Black-and-white horror magazine publisher. Titles: Chilling Tales of Horror; Ghoul Tales; Stark Terror
Star Publications	US	1949	1954	Founded after L.B. Cole acquired assets of Novelty Press
Starblaze Graphics	US	1978	1989	Imprint of The Donning Company; mainly published trade paperback collections and original graphic novels. Titles: MythAdventures; Elfquest; A Distant Soil
Star*Reach	US	1974	1991	Mike Friedrich's imprint
Strawberry Jam Comics	Canada	1985	1992	
Street & Smith Comics	US	1940	1949	
Studio Ironcat	US	1997	2006	Also known as I.C. Entertainment
Sumerian Comics	US	2020	Active	Currently publishes American Psycho, The Crow, Basic Instinct, and more.
Superior Publishers Limited	Canada	1945	1956	Reprinted American comics
Syzygy Publishing	US	2022	Active	Imprint of Image Comics. Titles: 7174 A.D., 7174 Annual, All Against All (#4-#5), The Cabinet (#1), The Feeding, A Haunted Girl, Hitomi (#4-#5), Joe Hill's Rain (#1), Lore Remastered, Les Mort 13 Giant Syze Special, Saucer Country: The Finale, Self Help, Tales of Syzpense
Takeshobo	Japan	1972	Active	
Tekno Comix	US	1995	1997	
Teshkeel Comics	Kuwait	2005	Active	Known for The 99
Texas Comics	US	1983	1983	
Thoughts & Images		1983	1988	
Timely Comics	US	1939	1950	Later became Atlas, then Marvel
The Library of American Comics	US	2007	Active	
Titan Books	UK	1981	Active	
TKO Studios	US	2018	Active	
Toby Press	US	1949	1955	Also known as Toby Comics
Todd McFarlane Productions	US	1992	Active	Titles: The Crow (1999), Curse of the Spawn (#9), Hellspawn: The Ashley Wood Collection, Sam & Twitch, Spawn (#4-#12, #189, #193, #195-#197, #199), Spawn Collection, Spawn: Godslayer, Spawn Origins Collection (#1-#9, #18-#19), Spawn: Endgame Collection, Violator
Toho Comics	US	2013	Active	A Future is comics with Godzilla comics series in Warner Bros./DC Comics
Tokuma Shoten	Japan	1954	Active	
Tokyopop	US	1997	Active	
Tokyopop	Germany	2004	Active	
Top Cow Productions	US	1992	Active	Titles: Angelus, Aphrodite IX, Cyber Force, Cyblade, The Darkness, Hunter-Killer, The Magdalena, Think Tank, Wanted, Witchblade
Topps Comics	US	1993	1998	
Top Shelf Comics	US	1997	Active	
Totenkopf Verlag	Germany	1991	1996	
Tower Comics	US	1965	1969	
Trident Comics	UK	1989	1992	
Trojan Magazines		1950	1955	
Triumphant Comics	US	1993	1994	
Tundra Publishing	US	1990	1993	Bought by Kitchen Sink Press in March of 1993 (Tundra UK was not part of this sale and folded)
UDON	Canada	2000	Active	Left Devil's Due Publishing to form its own publishing company
Ultimate Marvel	US	2000	Active	Imprint of Marvel Comics
UPN-Volksverlag	Germany	1969	Defunct	Becomes Volksverlag
Valiant Comics	US	1990; 2012	Active	Published by Voyager Communications. Became Acclaim Comics. Imprints: Armada, Windjammer (creator-owned line). Relaunched in 2012. Titles: Archer & Armstrong, Bloodshot, Eternal Warrior, Harbinger, H.A.R.D. Corps, Ninjak, Rai, The Second Life of Doctor Mirage, Shadowman, X-O Manowar
Vault Comics	US	2016	Active	
Verotik	US	1994	Active	
Vertigo Comics	US	1992	2020	
Vimanika Comics	India	2011	Active	Imprint: Vimanika Comics UK
Vimanika Comics UK	UK	2012	Active	UK-based imprint of Vimanika Comics
FAB Comics	Pakistan	2014	Active	Pakistani comic book publisher of original superhero and genre-based titles, including DarkLion, StormKiller, Zaryon, and family-friendly series such as Banana Man and Dr Serious. FAB Comics publishes digital releases, including titles distributed via GlobalComix.
Viper Comics	US	2003		
Virgin Comics	India, US	2005	2008	Renamed Liquid Comics on 25 September 2008
VIZ Media	US	1986	Active	A.k.a. Viz Comics, Viz Communications, Viz LLC
Volksverlag	Germany	1969	1984	Formerly UPN-Volksverlag; some titles moved to Alpha Comic Verlag
Vortex Comics	Canada	1982	1993	
Wandering Star Press	US		1987	Imprint of ACE Comics
Warp Graphics	US	1977	Active	Formerly WaRP Graphics. Former imprint Apple Comics, also known as Apple Press; became independent.
Warren Publishing	US	1957	1983	
WildStorm	US	1992	1999	A former imprint of Image Comics. Became part of DC Comics on 06. October 1998; Imprint: America's Best Comics Titles: Crimson, Danger Girl (1998 series), Grifter and the Mask, Team One
Wonder Color	US	1987	1987	Also known as Wonder Comics. Spearheaded by David Campiti; one of five publishers set up by Scott Mitchell Rosenberg/Sunrise Distribution. Most titles acquired by Pied Piper Comics
Yaoi Press	US	2004		
Youthful	US	1949	1954	Imprint: Youthful Magazines/Stamp Comics
Zenescope Entertainment	US	2005	Active	Titles: Grimm Fairy Tales, Man Goat and the Bunnyman
Zoolook	US	1996	Active	Publisher of the black comic book series Dread & Alive
Zuda	US	2007	2010	Online imprint of DC Comics; also printing popular comics (Bayou; High Moon; The Night Owls; Celadore)

== See also ==
- List of Golden Age comics publishers
- List of manga publishers

== Bibliography ==
- Bell, John. Invaders from the North. Dundurn Press, 2007. ISBN 978-1-55002-659-7
- Sanford, Jay Allen. "Two Men and their Comic Books", San Diego Reader (19. August 2004)
- Booker, M. Keith. Encyclopedia of Comic Books and Graphic Novels. ABC-CLIO, 2010. ISBN 978-0-313-35748-0
- Gabilliet, Jean-Paul. Of Comics and Men: A Cultural History of American Comic Books. translated by Beaty, Bart; and Nguyen, Nick. University Press of Mississippi, 2010. ISBN 978-1-60473-267-2
- Gravett, Paul, ed. (2001). 1001 Comics You Must Read Before You Die. New York, NY: Universe Publishing. ISBN 978-0-7893-2271-5.
- Voger, Mark; and Schaffenberger, Kurt. Hero Gets Girl!: The Life & Art of Kurt Schaffenberger. TwoMorrows Publishing, 2003. ISBN 978-1-893905-29-0
