= Ehmm Theory =

Publication information
- Publisher: Action Lab Comics
- Schedule: Monthly
- Format: Ongoing series
- Genre: Science fiction
- Publication date: 2013–ongoing
- No. of issues: 4

Creative team
- Created by: Brockton McKinney; Larkin Ford
- Written by: Brockton McKinney
- Artist: Larkin Ford
- Colorist: Aimee Hanchey

Ehmm Theory is a comic book series created by writer Brockton McKinney with art by Larkin Ford and published by Action Lab Comics. It is the story of Gabriel Ehmm, an unassuming young man who discovers he is linked to the access of alternative universes by blood. Together he and his talking kitten, Mr. Whispers, attempt to discover their true origins and shape the path of their future. The series is a bi-monthly ongoing and began in May 2013 to critical acclaim.

== Characters ==
This list only includes the cast listed in the most recent issue released.

- Gabriel Ehmm
- Mr. Whispers

== Collected editions ==
Ehmm Theory has been collected into the following trade paperbacks:

| Title | Material collected | ISBN | Story |
|---|---|---|---|
| Vol. 1: Cat, Quantum and Contrition | Ehmm Theory #1-4 | Diamond Order Code – DEC130812 | Gabriel Ehmm was doing just fine until the morning he woke up... dead! Now, along with his talking kitten, Mr. Whispers, the two begin the wildest ride of their un-lives. Ehmm Theory Volume One collects the critically acclaimed mind-melting adventure that features pint-sized zombie clowns, giant cybernetic crustaceans, and a super-team of the bizarre! Special Notes: Collects the first four critically acclaimed (Fangoria, Aint It Cool News) issues of the break-out hit series. |
