= Maria Pym =

Fictional character appearing in American comic books published by Marvel Comics

- MODAM and Quasar as depicted on the cover of Quasar #9 (April 1990). Art by Mike Manley.

Publication information
- Publisher: Marvel Comics
- First appearance: As Maria Trovaya Pym: Tales to Astonish #44 (June 1963); As S.O.D.A.M.: Solo Avengers #16 (March 1989); As M.O.D.A.M.: Quasar #9 (April 1990)
- Created by: Maria Trovaya: Stan Lee; H. E. Huntley; Jack Kirby; S.O.D.A.M.: Steve Englehart; Al Milgrom; M.O.D.A.M.: Mark Gruenwald; Mike Manle

In-story information
- Alter ego: Maria Trovaya Pym
- Team affiliations: A.I.M.; Red Room; The Femizons
- Partnerships: Henry "Hank" Pym (husband); Arkady Gregorivich "Omega Red" Rossovich (mercenary); Nadia van Dyne (daughter)
- Notable aliases: SODAM; MODAM; Maria Pym
- Abilities: Superhuman intelligence; Various psionic abilities; Telepathy; Powered exo-skeleton

Maria Trovaya Pym is a supervillain appearing in American comic books published by Marvel Comics, depicted as the first wife of Hank Pym and the mother of Nadia van Dyne. She was later captured and murdered by Communist agents.

Scientist Marcella Antonov is a scientist who was captured and mutated into a being nearly identical in appearance to MODOK called S.O.D.A.M. (and later M.O.D.A.M.). Initially mistaken for Maria Pym, Antonov was not identified by name until years after her introduction.

== Publication history ==
Maria Trovaya Pym debuted in Tales to Astonish #44 (plotted by Stan Lee, scripted by H. E. Huntley, and drawn by Jack Kirby, June 1963) as the deceased wife of Hank Pym whom his future partner and second wife Janet van Dyne resembles. A younger Maria Trovaya appears in flashbacks throughout The Unstoppable Wasp, starring the character's daughter Nadia and created by Mark Waid and Alan Davis, in a recurring capacity.

Marcella Antonov first appeared in The West Coast Avengers (vol. 2) #36 (1988) as an agent of A.I.M., created by Steve Englehart and Al Milgrom, in Solo Avengers #16 as SODAM, created by Tom DeFalco with Milgrom, and Quasar #9 as MODAM, created by Mark Gruenwald and Mike Manle. She was not identified by name until the series Marvel's Voices (2023), decades after her initial appearance.

== Fictional character biography ==
Maria Trovaya is the daughter of Janos Trovaya, a Hungarian geneticist and entomologist. Both were political prisoners before escaping to the United States, where her father started working for the United States government. Upon meeting Hank Pym, Maria fell in love with him and the pair married, returning to Maria's native Hungary for their honeymoon, describing Hank's laziness as signs of him being "not an industrious ant" and instilling him the interest in ants that ultimately leads him to become Ant-Man.

=== Kidnapping, pregnancy, and death ===
While in Hungary, Maria is kidnapped by communist agents. After reporting Maria's kidnapping to the American embassy in Hungary, Hank is informed that she has been found dead. That same day, Hank learns Maria's father has died in a laboratory explosion. Swearing revenge against anyone involved in Maria's murder, Hank goes on a rampage throughout Hungary and is imprisoned for assault, having been unable to find Maria's murderers.

Unbeknownst to Hank, Maria had been pregnant with his child prior to her death. She gave birth to a daughter, Nadia. Nadia was raised to become a potential Black Widow and later became the second Wasp.

=== Marcella Antonov ===
Marcella Antonov is a scientist who was gravely injured in a car crash caused by A.I.M., who had plans for her and her research. A.I.M. mutated Antonov into a large-headed creature similar to MODOK. Pym, believing Antonov to be Maria, takes her in, seeking to cure her condition. However, she steals files from him and returns to A.I.M. There, she is further mutated into a being nearly identical in appearance to MODOK called SODAM (Specialized Organism Designed for Aggressive Maneuvers), later called MODAM (Mental Organism Designed for Aggressive Maneuvers). MODAM later appears as a member of Superia's Femizons.

== Powers and abilities ==
As MODAM, Marcella Antonov was empowered through artificial acceleration of her brain tissue growth by means of mutagenic chemicals, radiation, and cybernetic implants. As a result, she possesses a superhuman intellect, and the ability to project psionic force for a number of effects, including concussive energy, generation of heat, and protective fields. She also possesses limited telepathy and imposition of her will upon others. MODAM's headband contains equipment which aids her in the focusing of her psionic powers.

MODAM is encased in an exo-skeletal shell of life-supporting machinery which augments her musculature, provides mobility, and performs various bodily functions. Sensors equipped throughout the exoskeleton monitor both her body's functions and the system's mechanical functions and transmit this data telemetrically to A.I.M. headquarters. MODAM is equipped with two telescoping tentacle-like arms which can extend up to 15 feet (4.6 m). MODAM's "hover-chair" contains anti-gravity generators enabling it to hover and chemically fueled rocket boosters to propel it. MODAM's musculature is atrophied (at least proportionally) while her head has been enlarged; thus, she is physically dependent on the exoskeleton for physical support and movement.
