= Nadia van Dyne =

Fictional Marvel Comics character

- Nadia van Dyne as depicted in The Unstoppable Wasp #1 (March 2017). Art by Elizabeth Torque.

Publication information
- Publisher: Marvel Comics
- First appearance: As Nadia Pym: Free Comic Book Day 2016 Civil War II (July 2016); As Nadia van Dyne: The Unstoppable Wasp #8 (August 2017)
- Created by: Nadia Pym: Mark Waid (writer); Alan Davis (artist); Nadia van Dyne: Jeremy Whitley (writer); Ted Brandt (artist); Rosy Higgins (artist)

In-story information
- Alter ego: Nadezhda "Nadia" van Dyne
- Species: Human mutate
- Team affiliations: Avengers; All-New, All-Different Avengers; Champions; G.I.R.L.
- Partnerships: Wasp (Janet van Dyne); Ant-Man (Scott Lang)
- Notable aliases: The Wasp
- Abilities: Flight via bio-synthetic wings; Bio-electric energy blasts; Size manipulation; Expert gymnast and acrobat; Expert martial artist; Genius intellect

Nadezhda "Nadia" van Dyne (née Pym) is a superhero appearing in American comic books published by Marvel Comics. Created by Mark Waid and Alan Davis, the character first appeared in Free Comic Book Day 2016 Civil War II (July 2016), and was loosely based on the Marvel Cinematic Universe character Hope van Dyne, played by Evangeline Lilly.

The daughter of Hank and Maria Pym, Nadia was raised as an assassin of the Red Room before escaping with the use of her father's Pym Particles and becoming the Unstoppable Wasp. Like her predecessor and stepmother, Janet van Dyne, Nadia is depicted as having the ability to shrink to a height of several centimeters, fly by means of insectoid wings, and fire bioelectric energy blasts, while like her biological father, she has bipolar disorder. She is a founding member of G.I.R.L. as well as a longtime leader of the organization.

== Publication history and creation ==
Nadia van Dyne first appeared in Free Comic Book Day 2016 Civil War II in July 2016 and was "created as a comic version of Evangeline Lilly's Hope van Dyne". Mark Waid noted that they wanted to introduce a character who was "a nod to Ant-Man's Hope van Dyne without in any way minimizing Janet's role in the Marvel Universe". The name "Nadia" is of Slavic origin and translates to "Hope".

She briefly had her own comic, The Unstoppable Wasp, but it was cancelled after eight issues. A second series with the same title debuted in October 2018 but was also cancelled after ten issues. In May 2020, Disney Books published a young adult novel written by Sam Maggs titled The Unstoppable Wasp: Built On Hope.

Throughout her appearances, writer Jeremy Whitley pushed for Nadia to be portrayed as asexual, first implied in The Unstoppable Wasp #2 (2017). Whitley noted that he was unable to explicitly show Nadia as asexual in his original run due to her "being a character who owed so much to a movie franchise" in reference to the Marvel Cinematic Universe's Hope van Dyne. In Marvel's Voices: Pride (2023), Nadia's asexuality was confirmed.

== Fictional character biography ==
Nadia is the child of Hank Pym and his first wife, Maria Trovaya, who was abducted and supposedly killed by foreign agents. Nadia was raised in the Red Room until she obtained a Pym Particle sample and escaped. Initially intending to meet her father, Nadia learns that he is believed to be dead, and instead uses parts of his costume and other materials to create a Wasp suit, hoping to obtain the admiration of her father's allies. She later meets Janet van Dyne, and they get along quite well, with Janet feeling that she has the potential to become a true hero.

Nadia soon joins the Avengers and gains U.S. citizenship. Upon realizing that S.H.I.E.L.D.'s index of the world's most intelligent people does not list any women above 27th place, she starts the program G.I.R.L. (Genius In action Research Labs) to look for women with genius intellects. When choosing a legal name, Nadia takes Janet's surname due to their bond, her support, and not knowing much about her birth parents.

She also aids Scott Lang — who is in outer space at that time — in an attempt to return to Earth, which results in a sequence of bizarre adventures in the Microverse. In the process, the two of them became quantum-entangled with each other. Nadia is later diagnosed with bipolar disorder, similar to her father, and learns that he is still alive and merged with Ultron. Hank Pym splits from Ultron by creating a separate body for himself.

== Powers and abilities ==
Similar to Janet van Dyne / Wasp, Nadia can alter her size like being tiny to becoming Giant. At will using Pym Particles, fly via bio-synthetic wings, and generate bio-electric blasts. Additionally, she is a skilled martial artist and acrobat due to her Red Room training, particularly in Krav Maga.

== Reception ==
=== Accolades ===
- In 2020, Comic Book Resources (CBR) ranked Nadia van Dyne 6th in their "10 Most Powerful Members Of The Pym Family" list and 9th in their "10 Most Powerful Teen Heroes In Marvel Comics" list.
- In 2021, Screen Rant included Nadia van Dyne in their "10 Most Powerful Members Of The Champions" list and in their "Red Room's Most Powerful Members" list.
- In 2021, CBR ranked Unstoppable Wasp 5th in their "Marvel: 10 Smartest Female Characters" list.
- In 2022, Screen Rant included Nadia van Dyne in their "10 Asexual Icons In Comic Books" list.

== In other media ==
- Nadia van Dyne / Wasp appears as a playable character in Marvel: Future Fight.
- Naida van Dyne / Wasp appears as a playable character in Marvel Avengers Academy, voiced by Sandra Osborne.

== Collected editions ==
Title	Material collected	Publication date	ISBN
The Unstoppable Wasp Vol. 1: Unstoppable!	The Unstoppable Wasp #1–4 and All-New, All-Different Avengers #14	September 12, 2017	978-1302906467
The Unstoppable Wasp Vol. 2: Agents of G.I.R.L.	The Unstoppable Wasp #5–8 and Tales to Astonish #44	March 13, 2018	978-1302906474
Ant-Man and the Wasp: Lost & Found	Ant-Man and the Wasp #1–5	November 20, 2018	978-0785194620
The Unstoppable Wasp: G.I.R.L. Power	The Unstoppable Wasp #1–8	April 2, 2019	978-1302916565
The Unstoppable Wasp: Unlimited Vol. 1: Fix Everything	The Unstoppable Wasp (vol. 2) #1–5	May 7, 2019	978-1302914264
The Unstoppable Wasp: Unlimited Vol. 2: G.I.R.L. VS. A.I.M.	The Unstoppable Wasp (vol. 2) #6–10	September 11, 2019	978-1302914271
