= Childish Things (disambiguation) =

Childish Things is a 2005 album by singer-songwriter James McMurtry.

Childish Things may also refer to:

== Literature ==
- A well-known verse from the Bible's New Testament
- Childish Things, a play by British playwright Alan Wilkins
- Childish Things, a 2001 novel by Scottish writer Robin Jenkins
- "Childish Things", a 1994 short story by American writer Bud Sparhawk
- "Childish Things", a 1993 story in the graphic-novel series Torsobear by Brett Uren
- "Childish Things", a 1993 volume of a Star Trek spinoff comic-book series

== Media ==
- Childish Things (film), an American 1969 film
- "Childish Things" (Deadwood episode), an episode of the American TV series
- "Childish Things" (Supergirl), an episode of the American TV series
- "Childish Things", an episode of the American TV series Eagle Riders
- "Childish Things", an episode of Adventures in Odyssey, an American radio show

== Music ==
- Childish Things, annual charity performances including the British band Out of the Blue
- "Childish Things", a song by Sweet Comfort Band on their 1977 self-titled album

== Other ==
- Childish Things, developers of the International Cricket Captain series of video games

== See also ==
- Monsters and Other Childish Things, a 2007 role-playing game
