= Brockton McKinney =

American comic book writer

- McKinney in his home studio in 2024
- Area: Writer
- Notable works: Rick & Morty (2023) Jenny Zero (2021) Mad Magazine (2019) Puppet Master: Blitzkrieg Massacre (2018) Evil Bong 666 (2017) AmeriKarate (2017) Gingerdead Man (2015) Killer Queen (2014) Ehmm Theory (2013) DeathCurse (2010)

Brockton McKinney is an American comic book writer, short story author, and horror film director & screenwriter. McKinney is known for writing the comic book series' Rick and Morty, Gingerdead Man, Ehmm Theory, and Amerikarate (comic book), and the films Evil Bong 666, Evil Bong 777, and Puppet Master for Full Moon Features, as well as being a contributing writer for Mad Magazine.

== Career ==
McKinney has co-written the films Sick and the Dead for Brain damage films and Rodney Cecil: Psycho Hero for American Shark Pictures. The latter was included in the top 5 "blood-on-a-budget" films from Rue Morgue. His short stories have been published in Horror Garage magazine, and volumes 1 & 3 of the anthology Pulp Empire.

His current work on the comic book series Ehmm Theory with artist and co-creator Larkin Ford has been hailed as "arguably the best three opening pages of the year so far" by Fangoria Magazine (2013) It was reported that Ehmm Theory issue #1 had sold-out at the distribution level on its opening day.

Ehmm Theory to return in May 2014 with Free Comic Book Day edition.

Red Stylo announced in March 2014 that McKinney and artist Bridgit Connell would be one of the creative teams on the Killer Queen comic book anthology.

Action Lab Comics to publish new Ehmm Theory miniseries solicited for September 2014 entitled "Everything & Small Doses". Strange Kids Club magazine called the book "beautiful insanity" and adds "You’ll love Ehmm Theory with every ounce of crazy that lives in your head."

McKinney and creator Brett Uren team-up on the story Home Invasion for the Torsobear : Yarns from Toyburg anthology to critical acclaim. A Place to Hang Your Cape website gushes "a graphic novel that epitomises the medium, offering the reader both a conventional expectation in that it delivers the visual punch only a graphic novel can deliver, and challenging the reader as to how far the fusion of adult themes with a child-friendly setup can be accepted."

McKinney was named the new creative director for the NC COMICON in March 2015. "As well as being an accomplished writer, Brockton has been helping the NC Comicon behind the scenes for years, and with the recent growth of this fan-favorite show we were thrilled to offer him a permanent position with our convention."

Action Lab Comics and Full Moon Features announced a new comic book series "Gingerdead Man" based on the films of the same name, and written by McKinney. Danger Zone publisher Jason Martin adds, “We here at Action Lab are fans of the Full Moon Features properties, and we knew that once we had the rights to publish Puppet Master comics, we also needed to bring some of Full Moon’s other fabulous gonzo creations to the comic book world. Gingerdead Man is one such concept begging to be further unleashed, and Brockton McKinney is the perfect man for the job!”

Action Lab Comics announced a new all-ages comic book series Zoe Dare versus the Disasteroid written & co-created by McKinney and illustrated & co-created by Andrew Herman. The series follows the exploits of a female stunt person tasked with saving the Earth from an impending alien invasion and debuts in June 2016.

In December 2016 website Bleeding Cool announced that McKinney would be writing a new comic book series entitled AmeriKarate with creator Corey Kalman, and illustrated by Bob's Burgers character designer Devin Roth. The book has been described as "a love-letter to the amazing action flicks of the '80s." It debuts on March 1, 2017.

In April 2017 McKinney was announced as the story co-writer of the Full Moon Features film, EVIL BONG 666, alongside film legend Charles Band. The film is already being hailed as "one of the best Full Moon movies in years"

Beginning in 2018 McKinney became a contributing writer for the newly relaunched Mad Magazine, including writing two of the Top Twenty Dumbest Moments in Mad's year-end retrospective issue.

In January 2021 McKinney was announced as co-creator & writer of the new Dark Horse Comics series Jenny Zero. Arriving in April 2021, the series follows the hard-drinking daughter of a superhero who must rise to the challenge of saving the world when the threat of massive creatures arises.

McKinney was announced as the writer for the Rick and Morty Maximum series from Oni Press in 2023.

== Personal life ==
McKinney is married to Holly McCormick McKinney, of The Sun in Chapel Hill, NC. They have one daughter, and an intensely lazy hound dog named Beezer.

== Awards ==
- 2014 [Best Single Issue] Best Single Issue 2014 for Ehmm theory #3 vol.2
- 2013 [Tartie Award] Best First Issue 2013 for Ehmm theory #1
- 2013 [Most Promising New Title 2013] for Ehmm Theory (shared with Larkin Ford)
- 2013 [Best Issue Of The Year] for Ehmm Theory #3
