= Joshua Dysart =

American comic book writer (born 1971)

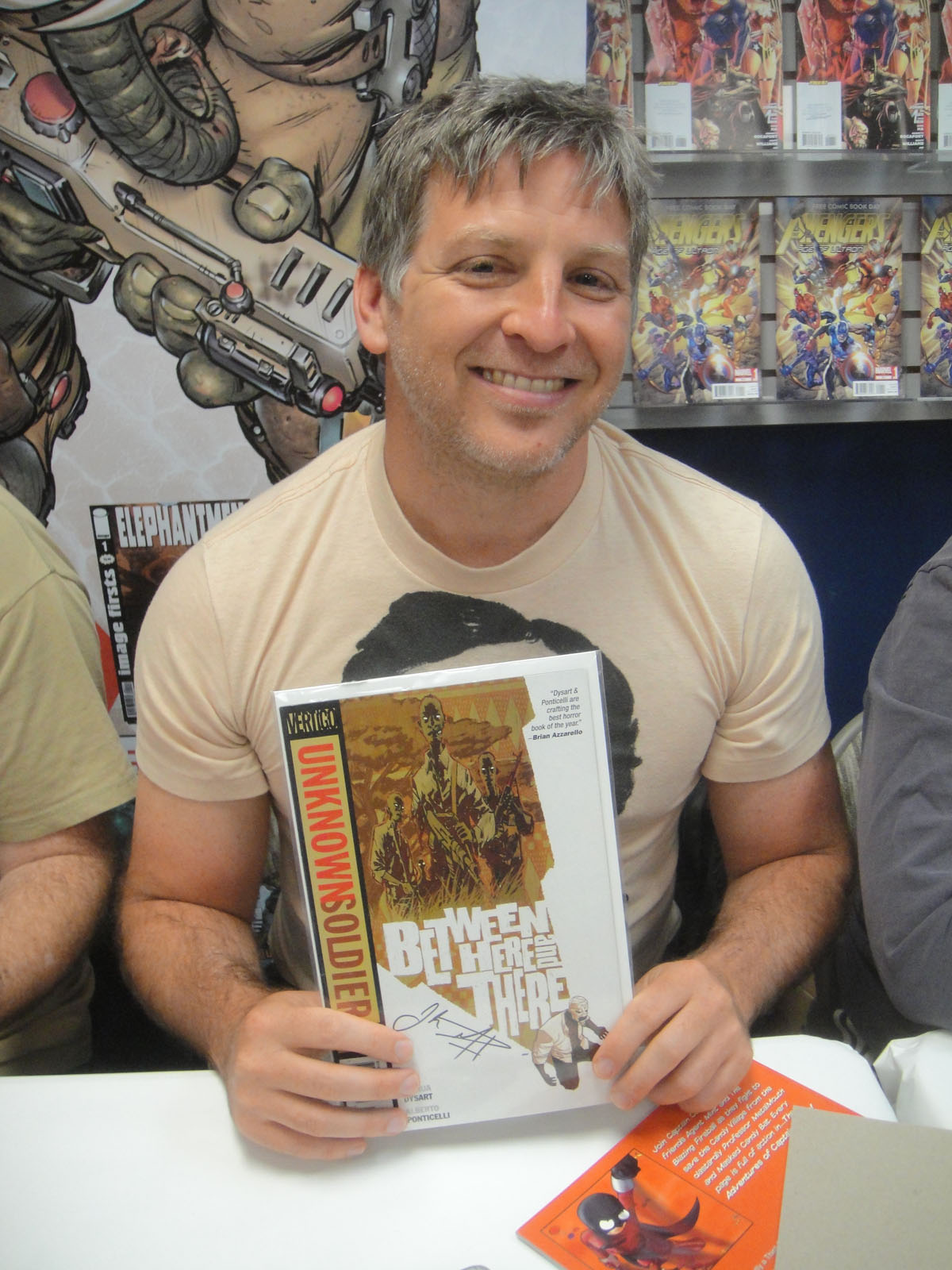
- Joshua Dysart on Free Comic Book Day in 2012
- Born: June 21, 1971 (age 55)
- Area: Writer

Joshua Dysart (/ˈdaɪzɑːrt/; born June 21, 1971) is an American comic book writer. He has done work for DC Comics, Vertigo Comics, Dark Horse Comics, Image Comics, Valiant Entertainment, IDW Publishing, Penny-Farthing Press, Virgin Comics and Random House Books.

== Career ==
=== Comics ===
Dysart co-created and wrote Violent Messiahs in 1997. The first eight issues, collected in the graphic novel Violent Messiahs Vol. I: Book of Job in 2002, were nominated for the Harvey Award, the Wizard Fan Award, and the Eisner's Russ Manning Award. The last four issues, a story arc entitled "Lamenting Pain", was not collected until 2009, when IDW Press decided to publish a trade which also featured never before seen developmental material and an unseen short story by Dysart.

More work followed, including a two-year stint as the monthly writer of Swamp Thing, writing issues #9–29 of the fourth series. His run featured the art of Enrique Breccia and Richard Corben (among others) on interiors and John Totleben and Eric Powell on covers. Dysart has also worked on Conan and Hellboy and has co-written with Mike Mignola on a series of projects in the same setting of Hellboy.

From 2008 to 2010 he wrote a revamp of The Unknown Soldier for Vertigo. The storyline took place in Acholiland, Uganda, in 2002 during the war between the Lord's Resistance Army and Ugandan People's Defence Force. Dysart spent a month in Northern Uganda for research. Issue #1 of Unknown Soldier was released in October 2008. The book was a monthly. It was nominated for an Eisner Award for Best New Series in 2009. and won a Glyph Comics Awards for Best cover. In 2010 Unknown Soldier won the Glyph for STORY OF THE YEAR. Unknown Soldier was featured on the front page of the art section of the New York Times and Dysart was interviewed by the BBC, who also published some of his research photos on their website. In December 2009 Dysart gave an exhaustive interview to WORLD VISION REPORT about his experiences in the conflict zone and attempts to adapt them into a mainstream, commercial work.

In June 2010, Vertigo Comics published Dysart's graphic novel based on Neil Young's 2003 album Greendale. Cliff Chiang drew the book. It spent two weeks at #3 on the New York Times Graphic Novel Best-Seller list.

In 2012 Joshua Dysart became one of the primary architects of the Valiant Universe when he helped launch the "Summer of Valiant" with fellow creators Robert Vinditti, Duane Swierzinski, Fred Van Lente, and Justin Jordan. It was a reboot of the shared superhero universe of 1990's era publisher Valiant Comics. He has since done two monthly series, the revamp of Harbinger and the original Imperium, and co-wrote Bloodshot for the publisher, as well as multiple single issues over the years. He and artist Khari Evans are responsible for bringing back the popular Faith/Zephyr character, an overweight female superhero, in her current incarnation. In 2013 he helmed Valiant's first summer crossover, Harbinger wars, which introduced his original creation, a team of super-powered children called Generation Zero. Generation Zero and Faith were both given their own individual series.

In 2015 the World Food Programme released Living Level-3: Iraq by Dysart, Alberto Ponticelli, Pat Masioni, and Thomas Mauer. For the work Dysart once again went to a war zone, traveling across northern Iraq in 2014 to interview Syrians, Yazidis, Kurds, and Arabic Christians who were fleeing both the Syrian Conflict and the rise of Da'esh. The work was first published, free to read, on Huffington Post World in four installments. In 2017 WFP released Living Level-3: South Sudan, the sequel by Dysart and the same team. Again, Dysart spent ten days traveling in the subject country for research. Focusing on the intersection of famine, civil war, and free market inflation in destabilizing the youngest nation in the world.

In 2018 Dysart once again was part of the launch line-up of a brand new company TKO Studios with an original graphic novel Goodnight Paradise. A murder mystery that takes place in the homeless culture of Venice Beach, California as it is rapidly gentrifying due to technology companies moving in. Dysart has lived in Venice Beach since the early 2000s. The book has received overwhelmingly positive reviews for its humanist exploration of community disintegration and displacement. The AV CLUB said, "the book is a savage takedown of a society that prioritizes profit over people." And Comics Beat concluded that it was, "As compassionate a portrayal of the homeless as any medium has seen in recent years." Goodnight Paradise is a prime example of a perennial theme of Dysart's:

"The issue of displaced humanity has been central to a lot of my work, going all the way back to my Unknown Soldier days, but this was the first time I've turned that lens on my own community. I suppose there's a richness of character and general detail that comes from the fact that this is pulled from more than a decade of material and thought on the subject and the place." - Joshua Dysart

In April 2022, Dysart was reported among the more than three dozen comics creators who contributed to Operation USA's benefit anthology book, Comics for Ukraine: Sunflower Seeds, a project spearheaded by IDW Publishing Special Projects Editor Scott Dunbier, whose profits would be donated to relief efforts for Ukrainian refugees resulting from the February 2022 Russian invasion of Ukraine. Dysart's contribution is an editorial on Ukrainian artists.

=== Media tie-in ===
Dysart has been extensively involved in multi-media crossovers over his career. He authored the one-shot Van Helsing: Beneath the Rue Morgue (an original story featuring the character from the Universal film) and penned Skull & Bones: A Monster House Story, which was tied into the Sony animated children's Monster House. He's also had his comic books included in the packaging for both the Age of Conan: Hyborian Adventures MMO computer game from Funcom and the Hellboy: The Science of Evil video game from Konami. He has written a two-volume 270 page graphic novel for Avril Lavigne entitled Make 5 Wishes which was published by Del Rey Manga and Random House. That book has been printed in over seven languages as well as digitally distributed throughout Asia. His six-issue comic book mini-series adaptation of the Deepak Chopra novel Buddha: A Story of Enlightenment was published in December 2010.

In 2013 Archaia Entertainment LLC published Dysart's The Dark Crystal: Creation Myths, Volume 2. Taking place in Jim Henson's Dark Crystal universe, Dysart's story tells of the cracking of the crystal.

In 2015 Valiant Entertainment announced a five-picture deal with Sony Pictures to bring two of its series Bloodshot and Dysart's Harbinger, to the big screen. Both Bloodshot and Harbinger will receive two features each before a fifth movie, Harbinger Wars, also written by Dysart, is hoped to be released.

=== Advocacy and education ===
Dysart has, on multiple occasions, taught and talked about the role of comics in pop-culture, as well as actively promoted comics "he feels bring a wider audience to the medium". He has produced discussion panels for the West Hollywood Book Fair in 2006 and moderated in 2007 as well as written about the virtue of comics for the LA Weekly. In 2008 and 2009 he was a special guest at Ohio University's Aesthetics Technology Lab and even wrote a short comic story about his experiences there that featured the art of Ronald Wimberly. That story, called THE STAIN, was a Best American Comics of 2010 notable entry. In 2009 Dysart spoke at the University of Miami on his experiences writing the Unknown Soldier. That same year he interviewed Bryan Lee O'Malley on Scott Pilgrim vs. The World. In 2010 he interviewed David Petersen on his Eisner-award-winning Mouse Guard comic.

In 2018, Dysart wrote a short piece for Love is Love, a graphic tribute to the victims of the Orlando nightclub shooting. He also wrote a short comic about the marketing of the AR-15 for Where We Live, a graphic novel benefitting the survivors of the mass shooting that took place at the Las Vegas Route 91 Harvest music festival.

In 2018, Dysart became involved in the early stages of Comics For Peace, a Pakistani initiative by locals to encourage and promote positive social change through the medium of comic books. He helped hand choose and then mentor young creatives from across Pakistan. The students created stories that brought attention to the societal issues that concerned them, including discrimination, hate, violence and extremism. Two creators published by the program and mentored by Dysart were brought to the 2019 San Diego Comic-Con, where they were given a table and spent the convention pitching their comics to attendees. In the process, thousands of free comics created by Pakistani young people were handed out.

== Bibliography ==
An incomplete selection of work:

- The Life and Death of Toyo Harada (2019)
- Goodbye Paradise (with Alberto Ponticelli and Giulia Brusco, TKO Studios, 2018, ISBN 978-1732748521)
- Urgence Niveau 3 (French book collection of Living Level-3 web comics, 2019)
- Where We Live, A Benefit for the Survivors in Las Vegas (2018)
- Hellboy The Complete Short Stories (2018)
- Love Is Love (2016)
- Imperium (2015)
  - vol. 01 - 'Collecting Monsters' (2015)
  - vol. 02 - 'Broken Angels' (2015)
  - vol. 03 - 'The Vine Imperative' (2016)
  - vol. 04 - 'Stormbreak' (2016)
- Harbinger: Omegas (2014)
- Harbinger Wars (128 pages, Valiant Entertainment, 2013, ISBN 1939346096)
- Jim Henson's The Dark Crystal Volume 2: Creation Myths (96 pages, Archaia, 2013)
- Bloodshot and H.A.R.D.Corps (2013)
- Harbinger collected as:
  - Volume 1: Omega Rising (128 pages, Valiant Entertainment, 2012, ISBN 0979640954)
  - Volume 2: Renegades (128 pages, Valiant Entertainment, 2013, ISBN 1939346029)
  - Volume 3: Harbinger Wars (128 pages, Valiant Entertainment, 2013, ISBN 1939346118)
  - Volume 4: Perfect Day (2013)
  - Volume 5: Death of a Renegade (2014)
- Buddha - A Story of Enlightenment, (160 pages, Dynamite Entertainment, December 2010, ISBN 1-60690-185-0)
- Greendale (with Cliff Chiang, graphic novel. Vertigo, June 2010, ISBN 1-4012-2698-1)
- Unknown Soldier collected as:
  - Volume 1: Haunted House (144 pages, Vertigo Comics, 2009, ISBN 1-4012-2311-7)
  - Volume 2: Easy Kill (200 pages, Vertigo Comics, 2010, ISBN 1-4012-2600-0)
  - Volume 3: Dry Season (144 pages, Vertigo Comics, 2010, ISBN 1-4012-2855-0)
  - Volume 4: Beautiful World (128 pages, Vertigo Comics, 2011, ISBN 1-4012-3176-4)
- BPRD collected as:
  - 1946 (144 pages, Dark Horse Comics, 2008, ISBN 1-59582-191-0)
  - 1947 (160 pages, Dark Horse Comics, 2010, ISBN 1-59582-478-2)
- Conan and the Midnight God (136 pages, Dark Horse Comics, 2007, ISBN 1-59307-852-8)
- Make 5 Wishes Volume I & II (156 pages, Titan Books, 2007)
- Swamp Thing collected as:
  - Love in Vain (144 pages, Vertigo Comics, 2006, ISBN 1-4012-0934-3)
  - Healing The Breach (144 pages, Vertigo Comics, 2005, ISBN 1-4012-0493-7)
- Captain Gravity and the Power of the Vril (193 pages, Penny Farthing Press, 2006, ISBN 0-9719012-8-7)
- Violent Messiahs collected as:
  - Book of Job (224 pages, Image Comics, 2002, ISBN 1-58240-236-1)
  - Book of Job Reprint (224 pages, IDW Publishing, 2008, ISBN 1-60010-251-4)
  - Lamenting Pain (144 pages, IDW Publishing, 2009, ISBN 1-60010-297-2)

== Notes ==
Preceded by Will Pfeifer	Swamp Thing writer 2004–2006	Succeeded by Scott Snyder
