= Navigating with You =

Graphic novel written by Jeremy Whitley

- First edition cover
- Page count: 220 pages
- Publisher: Maverick

Creative team
- Writer: Jeremy Whitley
- Artist: Cassio Ribeiro
- Letterers: Nikki Foxrobot, Micah Myers

Original publication
- Language: English
- ISBN: 9781952303609

Navigating with You is a graphic novel written by American comic writer Jeremy Whitley and illustrated by Cassio Ribeiro. It was published on August 13, 2024 by Maverick.

== Plot summary ==
After Black lesbian honors student Neesha Sparks is sent to remedial classes due to her principal falsely believing that her cerebral palsy means she is intellectually disabled, she meets another new kid, bisexual Puetro Rican-Mexican Gabby Graciana. While Neesha is initially put off by Gabby's chattiness and excitability, the two girls bond over their mutual love of the out-of-print manga Super Navigator Nozomi, which appears in black-and-white segments throughout the book. After Neesha's father sells her copies of the manga, the duo go on a hunt across North Carolina to find the missing volumes, dealing with growing romantic feelings for each other along the way. The novel deals with themes of ableism and grief, with Gabby dealing the death of her mother.

== Reception ==
Navigating with You was positively reviewed by critics, including starred reviews from Booklist and School Library Journal. Booklist's Victoria Rahbar praised Ribeiro's ability to transition from "a North American comic art–style to a manga-art style for pages of Super Navigator Nozomi". Kirkus Reviews praised the character development and handling of complex topics like ableism, racism, and abusive relationships. Publishers Weekly also reviewed the book positively.

School Library Journal named Navigating with You one of the best graphic novels of 2024, and the Young Adult Library Services Association included it on their list of the Top 10 Great Graphic Novels for Teens of 2025.

=== Accolades ===
Year	Award	Result	Ref.
2025	Harvey Award for Best Young Adult Book	Shortlisted	
2025	Ringo Award for Best Single Issue or Story	Shortlisted	
2025	Mike Morgan & Larry Romans Children's & Young Adult Literature Award	Honored	

== Sequel ==
A sequel, Navigating With You Vol. 2, released in November 2026.
