= Spencer & Locke =

Thriller comic book

- Spencer and Locke from the cover of issue 1. Art by Jorge Santiago, Jr.

Publication information
- Publisher: Action Lab Comics
- Genre: Crime, Noir, Action, Parody, Psychological Thriller
- Publication date: 2017

Creative team
- Written by: David Pepose
- Artist(s): Jorge Santiago, Jr.
- Letterer: Colin Bell
- Colorist: Jasen Smith

Spencer & Locke is a neo-noir psychological thriller comic book by writer David Pepose and artist Jorge Santiago, Jr. Its first issue was published April 2017 by Action Lab Comics. The series parodies Bill Watterson's comic strip Calvin and Hobbes and Frank Miller's comic books Sin City, Daredevil: The Man Without Fear, and The Dark Knight Returns.

== Plot ==
Spencer & Locke follows hard-boiled Detective Locke as he returns to the bleak urban neighborhood of his youth to investigate the brutal murder of his childhood sweetheart, schoolteacher Sophie Jenkins. As Locke is forced to confront memories of his abusive upbringing, he turns to his childhood imaginary friend — a giant talking panther named Spencer — to help crack the case. But when a vicious crime syndicate led by Locke's father, Augustus, kidnaps Sophie's young daughter, Hero, Spencer and Locke must overcome overwhelming odds as well as their own traumatic pasts in order to learn the truth about Sophie's death.

Set six months after the conclusion of the first series, Spencer & Locke 2 finds Detective Locke under investigation from Internal Affairs, as his increasingly feral imaginary panther Spencer urges him to return to fighting crime. As Locke struggles to keep his inner demons in check, the city is attacked by a scarred former soldier named Roach Riley, who will push Spencer and Locke to their limits as they attempt to clear their names and stop Roach's reign of terror.

== Characters ==
- Locke is a tenacious and aggressive detective whose temper is dwarfed by the scars of his abusive upbringing. Determined to bring in Sophie Jenkins' killer at all costs, Locke has developed a unique coping mechanism that he has carried with him through adulthood: his imaginary talking panther, Spencer.
- Spencer is Locke's partner, a seven-foot-tall imaginary talking panther. A psychological byproduct of Locke's harrowing childhood, Spencer acts as Locke's instincts as a detective, as well as his conscience, empathy, and desire to protect the innocent.
- Sophie is Locke's childhood sweetheart, whose murder brings Locke back to the old neighborhood. A schoolteacher at the embattled Parkwood School, Sophie's death triggers a chain reaction among the city's criminal underworld, bringing Locke head-to-head with his drug kingpin father, Augustus.
- Hero is Sophie's precocious young daughter, and unbeknownst to Locke, also his child. After putting Spencer and Locke on the trail of former schoolyard bully and current low-level enforcer Stanley, she is kidnapped as a bargaining chip by Augustus.
- Augustus is Locke's long-absent father, who has become a powerful crime lord in the intervening years. Ruthless and terrifying, Augustus is willing to kill anyone who interferes with his business, including his police detective son Locke and his granddaughter Hero.
- Roach is Spencer and Locke's arch-nemesis in Spencer & Locke 2. The sole survivor of his platoon following a devastating overseas raid, Roach has returned to his hometown with a mission of bloodshed and violence, driven by the ghost of his former commanding officer Major.

== Reception ==
According to the review aggregator site Comic Book Roundup, Spencer & Locke has received an average rating of 8.4 out of 10. IGN reviewer Jeff Lake called the first issue of Spencer & Locke "a fiendishly fun take on an age old classic," describing the book as "a stylish noir mystery, not to mention a layered examination of mental health." Batman and Justice League writer Scott Snyder called the series "a richly imagined and darkly original tale" and "a fantastic debut." Hannibal Tabu also praised the book in his "The Buy Pile" column on Comic Book Resources, saying the series "will yank you to the edge of your seat." In June 2018, Spencer & Locke received five nominations for the 2018 Ringo Awards, with the book earning a nomination for Best Series, as well as David Pepose being nominated for Best Writer, Jorge Santiago, Jr. being nominated for Best Cover Artist, Jasen Smith being nominated for Best Colorist, and Colin Bell being nominated for Best Letterer.

Spencer & Locke 2 was ranked with an average score of 8.9 out of 10 by review aggregator site Comic Book Roundup. In his review of the sequel's first issue, IGN reviewer Jesse Schedeen praised the inclusion of motifs from Frank Miller's The Dark Knight Returns and Alan Moore and Dave Gibbons' Watchmen, saying "the Spencer & Locke formula retains its appeal thanks to an even more ambitious sequel." Stacy Baugher of MajorSpoilers.com called Spencer & Locke 2 "the psychological, homage filled, crime noir book you never knew you needed until now." Leading into the trade paperback release of the entire series, Barnes & Noble named Spencer & Locke 2 one of the Best Comics and Graphic Novels of August 2019. Spencer & Locke 2 was nominated in the 2020 Ringo Awards for Best Single Issue.

== Film adaptation ==
Spencer & Locke was officially announced in October 2016 by The Hollywood Reporter as part of its New York Comic Con coverage. In July 2017, producer Adrian Askarieh and Prime Universe Films announced they had optioned the film rights to the comics series.

== Sequels ==
Spencer & Locke 2 was officially announced in October 2017 by Action Lab Comics during New York Comic Con. The series, which featured a dark parody of Mort Walker's Beetle Bailey named Roach Riley, was released in 2019.

Following the release of Spencer & Locke 2, Action Lab Comics announced Spencer & Locke III during New York Comic Con in September 2019. The upcoming series is said to include parodies of Jim Davis's Garfield and Charles Schulz's Peanuts.
