= Princeless =

Kitap serisi

Publication information
- Publisher: Action Lab Comics
- Format: Ongoing series
- Genre: Fantasy, Humor, Adventure
- Publication date: 2011

Creative team
- Created by: Jeremy Whitley
- Written by: Jeremy Whitley
- Artists: Mia Goodwin; Emily Martin; Rosy Higgins; Ted Brandt

Princeless is an American all-ages comic book series by Jeremy Whitley. It was nominated for two Eisner Awards, "Best Single Issue" and "Best Comic for Kids Ages 8-12", and five Glyph Comics Awards, winning the categories "Best Female Character", "Best Writer", and "Story of the Year" A spinoff comic book series Princeless: Raven the Pirate Princess premiered at 2015 San Diego Comic-Con.

== Plot ==
Princeless tells the story of Princess Adrienne, a strong-minded, brave, and intelligent black princess who questions and challenges expectations and stereotypes associated with princesses. From a young age, Adrienne resents any limitations placed on her as a princess and struggles against them in order to define her own role. On her 16th birthday she is tricked into imprisonment in a tower, as is the expected fate of any princess in the land. Instead of waiting for a prince to rescue her, Adrienne escapes from her tower with the aid of her guardian dragon, trades her dress and crown for armor and sword and sets out to rescue her six sisters from their own prisons.

== Characters ==
- Princess Adrienne Ashe is tomboyish, sarcastic, direct, smart, courageous and outspoken. She loves eating steak and is better at swordsmanship than her twin brother. She absolutely refuses to accept her duties and expectations as a princess. While her sisters have spent much of their lives competing to be the prettiest or the most regal, all Adrienne has ever wanted is to have her own adventures. Consequently, Adrienne is seen as a bit of an oddball in the family. Adrienne is based largely off of and named after Jeremy Whitley's own sister-in-law, Adrienne.
- Prince Devin is usually left out among the Ashe family. Not only is he the solitary boy among the six sisters, but his father holds him to be a disappointment since he prefers poetic pursuits over learning to be a warlike King. In contrast to his more volatile twin sister Adrienne, he is rather quiet and mild-mannered.
- King Ashe is a man who fears for the future of his kingdom. He is extremely strict, stubborn, cruel to his subjects and somewhat misogynistic. He desperately wants an heir that he feels can continue to steer and preserve the kingdom after he's gone. However, no matter what he tries, everything seems to be working against him. And he thinks it's his own fault. King Ashe used to be a gallant young prince who was more interested in winning tournaments and boasts than ruling a kingdom and that eventually cost him dearly. When his father The High King died he was forced to fight a fierce civil war to reclaim his kingdom. He spent a good chunk of his life just trying not to lose the kingdom his father left to him and he fears the same will be true of his children when he's gone and he feels that no one else seems concerned about this.
- Queen Ashe is the timid and obedient wife of King Ashe. Unlike her husband, she is admired by all her subjects and adored by her children. In her mind, she knows the things that King Ashe does is wrong, but feels powerless to do anything to change his mind. She is from a distant land to which she hasn't returned in decades.
- Bedelia Smith is the half-Dwarf blacksmith's daughter who has secretly been making all the armor for years while her father drinks at the pub. She and Princess Adrienne meet when she is looking for armor that will fit her better. Adrienne inspires her to start making armor that is actually functional for women, allowing Bedelia to realize her true purpose. She joins Adrienne on her quest as a partner and friend.
- Sparky is the dragon originally trained to guard Princess Adrienne's tower, but abandons her post when Adrienne reveals that her whole purpose was to eventually be killed by a "worthy suitor". Sparky instantly decides to help Adrienne escape her tower and becomes her mount and traveling companion.
- Raven Xingtao is the daughter and rightful heir of the Pirate King. She is on a quest for revenge against her brothers who stole her inheritance. Raven originally appeared in the Princeless series, before starring in her own spin-off comic book series, Princeless: Raven the Pirate Princess. Creator Jeremy Whitley confirmed that Raven is lesbian.

=== Adrienne's six sisters ===
- Princess Alize Ashe is the responsible oldest sister of the Ashe family. Alize's life as a princess has been marked less by parties and courtship and more by looking after her sisters. Being locked away in a tower was secretly a relief.
- Princesses Antonia and Andrea Ashe are twin sisters who have worked constantly to separate themselves from one another. They are constantly changing their hair, their look, and even their lives in an effort to not be confused with the other one. Consequently, they are incredibly competitive and locked in a struggle to get a leg up on the other sister. Their resentment has made them surprisingly resourceful.
- Princess Angoisse Ashe is the middlest sister. Angoisse was born between the warring twins and the most beautiful princess in the kingdom. Consequently, she has always felt neglected and unimportant. Sadly, she judges much of her worth by who is paying attention to her, especially boys.
- Princess Angelica Ashe is the most beautiful girl in the kingdom. This is not an opinion, it is held to be objective truth; she has been sought after and courted from a very young age and it may have gone to her head.
- Princess Appalonia Ashe loves nothing more than walking in the woods and singing with her animal friends. She has been writing songs and singing for her own enjoyment since she was a baby. Appalonia wants nothing more than to be the Queen of a faraway land full of loving and loyal subjects.

== Collected Editions ==
Book	Title	Publication date	Reference
1	Princeless Book 1: Save Yourself	May 16, 2012	
2	Princeless Book 2: Get Over Yourself	November 26, 2014	
3	Princeless Book 3: The Pirate Princess	May 20, 2015	
4	Princeless Book 4: Be Yourself	October 21, 2015	
5	Princeless Book 5: Make Yourself	July 13, 2016	
6	Princeless Book 6: Make Yourself Part Two	November 8, 2017	
7	Princeless Book 7: Find Yourself	March 20, 2018	
8	Princeless Book 8: Princesses	July 30, 2018	
9	Princeless Book 9: Love Yourself	November 2019	

== Reception ==
=== Awards and nominations ===
Award	Year	Category	Recipients	Outcome	Reference
Eisner Awards	2012	Best Single Issue	"Princeless" #3, by Jeremy Whitley and M. Goodwin	Nominated	
Eisner Awards	2012	Best Comic for Kids Ages 8–12	Princeless, by Jeremy Whitley and M. Goodwin	Nominated	
Glyph Comics Awards	2012	Story of the Year	Princeless	Won	
Glyph Comics Awards	2012	Best Writer	Jeremy Whitley	Won	
Glyph Comics Awards	2012	Best Female Character	Adrienne	Won	

== Film adaptation ==
In July 2017, it was announced Sony Pictures and Anonymous Content will produce a movie based on the comics series.

== See also ==
- List of feminist comic books
- Portrayal of women in comics
