= David Pepose =

American comic book writer and journalist

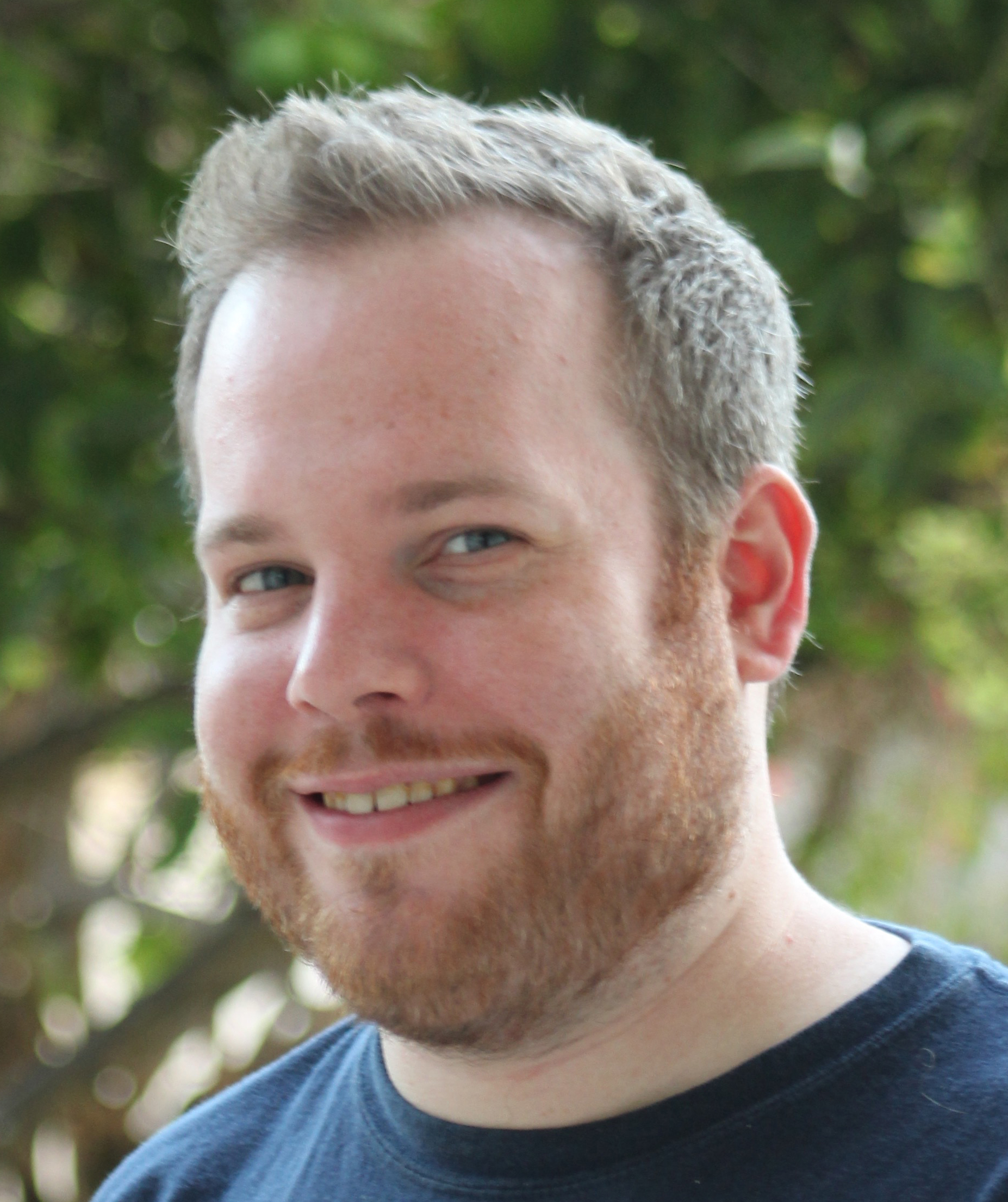
- Pepose in 2016
- Born: David Pepose
- Area: Writer
- Notable works: Spencer & Locke, The O.Z., Savage Avengers, Punisher, Space Ghost, Cable: Love and Chrome

David Pepose is an American comics writer and former crime reporter who has written for Marvel Comics and independent comics. His book Spencer & Locke was nominated multiple times for the Ringo Awards and he won in 2021 for Best Single Issue for his self-published comic The O.Z.

== Career ==
Pepose worked as a reviewer and editor at Newsarama before deciding to write his own comics. His first comic, Spencer & Locke, was published through Action Lab Comics in 2017 with artist Jorge Santiago. It was described as "What would you get if you crossed Calvin and Hobbes and Sin City?" It was optioned for a movie by Adrian Askarieh, the producer of the Hitman films, and was nominated for Best Series at the 2018 Ringo Awards. In 2019, he and Santiago put out a sequel, Spencer & Locker 2, which satirized Beetle Bailey, which was also nominated in the 2020 Ringo Awards. He also wrote an action-comedy called Going to the Chapel.

In 2020, he ran a kickstarter to fund self-publishing The O.Z., a comic which recasts Oz as a war zone. Per Pepose: "The O.Z. is like what if The Hurt Locker took place in The Wizard of Oz — we’re reimagining Dorothy Gale killing the Wicked Witch of the West as something akin to a botched regime change, and when Dorothy returned home to Kansas, she inadvertently left Oz in a horrific power vacuum that would spiral into brutal civil war." The book won the 2021 Ringo Award for Best Single Issue or Story. He also published the post-apocalyptic comic Scout's Honor through AfterShock Comics, about a cult in the aftermath of a global disaster that has built itself around a single artifact: a Boy Scouts manual.

In 2022, he and artist Carlos Magno were announced as the creative team for the new Savage Avengers book from Marvel. He also wrote two issues of Fantastic Four set during the A.X.E.: Judgment Day crossover. In 2023, he wrote stories for Carnage Reigns and Extreme Venomverse, as well as a five-issue mini-series Moon Knight: City of the Dead, which introduced a new Scarlet Scarab similar to the one on the Disney+ show. In July 2023, at San Diego Comic-Con, it was revealed that he would be writing a new Punisher mini-series about a brand new Punisher, Joe Garrison.

In 2024, Dynamite Entertainment announced that Pepose would write a new Space Ghost comic series with artist Jonathan Lau. In September 2024, it was announced that he and artist Mike Henderson would be the creative team for a new Cable mini-series, Cable: Love and Chrome. In November 2024, it was announced that he would be writing a new Speed Racer series from Mad Cave Studios starting with a Free Comic Book Day issue. In January 2025, it was announced that he would write a new Captain Planet comic for Dynamite Entertainment. This would be the first Captain Planet series in three decades.

== Personal life ==
Pepose graduated magna cum laude from Brandeis University. He studied American Studies, creative writing and theater arts.

== Bibliography ==
=== Marvel Comics ===
- Avengers Unlimited Infinity Comic #1-6 (2022), #43-48 (2023)
- Cable: Love and Chrome #1-5 (2025)
- Carnage Reigns Alpha #1, short story "Flesh and Blood" (2023)
- Elektra: Black, White & Blood #3, short story "Weapons of Choice" (2022)
- Extreme Venomverse #2, short story "The Prisoner" (2023)
- Fantastic Four vol. 6 #47-48 (2022)
- Hulk Annual vol. 3 #1 (2023)
- Moon Knight:
  - Moon Knight: Black, White & Blood #2, short story "A Hard Day's Knight" (2022)
  - Moon Knight: City of the Dead #1-5 (2023)
- Punisher vol. 14 #1-4 (2023-2024)
- Savage Avengers vol. 2 #1-10 (2022-2023)
- Spider-Verse Unlimited Infinity Comic #37 (2023)
- Star Wars: Darth Vader - Black, White & Red #2, short story "The Endless Mercy" (2023)

=== Other Comics ===
==== Action Lab Comics ====
- Going to the Chapel #1-4 (2019-2020)
- Spencer & Locke #1-4 (2017)
- Spencer & Locke 2 #1-4 (2019)

==== AfterShock Comics ====
- Scout's Honor #1-5 (2021)

==== Dynamite Entertainment ====
- Space Ghost #1-present (2024–present)
- Captain Planet and the Planeteers #1- (2025)

==== Mad Cave Studios ====
- The Devil That Wears My Face #1-6 (2023-2024)
- Speed Racer #0- (2025)

==== Papercutz ====
- Ten-Ton Titan Terrier Vol. 1 (2025)

==== Other ====
- Cthulhu Is Hard To Spell, short story "The Master of Kung Fthulhu" (2022) (Wannabe Press)
- HELP: The Hero Initiative Anthology, short story "S.O.S." (2022) (Hero Initiative)
- Nightmare Theater: A Cinematic Horror Anthology, short story "Die, Die, Danger Ronin!" (2021) (Bloodline Comics)
- The O.Z. #1-3 (2020-2026) (self-published)
- Project Big Hype, short story "Roxy Rewind" (2021) (Jumpstart Comics)
