= The Unstoppable Wasp =

American comic book series

- Promotional art for The Unstoppable Wasp Vol. 2, depicting the title character in flight. Art by Gurihiru.

Publication information
- Publisher: Marvel Comics
- Schedule: Monthly
- Format: Ongoing series
- Genre: Superhero
- Publication date: Vol. 1: January–August 2017; Vol. 2: December 2018–July 2019
- No. of issues: Vol. 1: 8 Vol. 2: 10
- Main character: Nadia van Dyne (née Pym)

Creative team
- Created by: Jeremy Whitley; Elsa Charretier
- Written by: Jeremy Whitley
- Artist(s): Elsa Charretier (Vol. 1); Gurihiru (Vol. 2)
- Penciller(s): Elsa Charretier (Vol. 1); Gurihiru (Vol. 2)
- Inker(s): Elsa Charretier (Vol. 1); Gurihiru (Vol. 2)
- Letterer: Joe Caramagna
- Colorist(s): Megan Wilson (Vol. 1); Gurihiru (Vol. 2)
- Editor(s): Alanna Smith; Tom Brevoort

The Unstoppable Wasp is an ongoing American comic book series published by Marvel Comics featuring Nadia van Dyne. The solo series initially debuted in January 2017 and ran for 8 issues as a part of Marvel NOW! 2.0, before relaunching in October 2018 for another run of 10 issues. The series were written by Jeremy Whitley. Art was by Elsa Charretier from the start of the publication until the second run, which Gurihiru took over as artist for. In May 2020, Disney Books published a young adult novel continuing the series written by Sam Maggs, titled The Unstoppable Wasp: Built On Hope. Critics have praised the series for its comedy as well as its portrayal of relationships and bipolar disorder.

== Publication history ==
Starting in July 2016, the Civil War II crossover storyline affected a number of Marvel comics and characters, introducing the character of Nadia Pym / The Wasp. Marvel announced in late 2016 that, after Civil War was complete, they would relaunch their entire line as part of a Marvel NOW! 2.0 rebranding, including The Unstoppable Wasp, with the series following Nadia after acquiring U.S. citizenship, as she starts the program G.I.R.L. (Genius In action Research Labs) to look for women with genius intellects upon realizing that S.H.I.E.L.D.'s index of the world's most intelligent people doesn't list any women above 27th place, adopting the new surname "Van Dyne" after Janet van Dyne.

== Reception ==
Issue #1 was published on January 5, 2017, to positive reviews. The Unstoppable Wasp was praised for its comedy, and the character of Nadia Pym (later van Dyne) was seen as empowering for being likable, smart, and having an infectious charm unlike that of typical superheroes. ComicsAlliance praised the series' "structure, pacing and character interactions", regarded its "Unstoppable" title as "the perfect adjective for the series, because Nadia represents a kind of determination and perseverance that’s both admirable and inspiring." CBR expressed interest in the series being adapted to the Marvel Cinematic Universe, while Comics Beat lauded the series' "enticing" nature and "Jeremy Whitley’s commitment to Nadia Pym’s unwavering & infectious optimism against the worst odds [with] Elsa Charretier’s incredible layouts and spreads add[ing] so much substance to the vibrant personality of this comic". The series' depiction of bipolar disorder was also praised.

== Collected editions ==
The series has been collected into trade paperbacks:

Title	Material collected	Publication date	ISBN
The Unstoppable Wasp Vol. 1: Unstoppable!	The Unstoppable Wasp #1–4 and All-New, All-Different Avengers #14	September 12, 2017	978-1302906467
The Unstoppable Wasp Vol. 2: Agents of G.I.R.L.	The Unstoppable Wasp #5–8 and Tales to Astonish #44	March 13, 2018	978-1302906474
The Unstoppable Wasp: G.I.R.L. Power	The Unstoppable Wasp #1–8	April 2, 2019	978-1302916565
The Unstoppable Wasp: Unlimited Vol. 1: Fix Everything	The Unstoppable Wasp (vol. 2) #1–5	May 7, 2019	978-1302914264
The Unstoppable Wasp: Unlimited Vol. 2: G.I.R.L. VS. A.I.M.	The Unstoppable Wasp (vol. 2) #6–10	September 11, 2019	978-1302914271
The Unstoppable Wasp: A.I.M. Escape!	The Unstoppable Wasp (vol. 2) #1–10	January 26, 2021	978-1302923846

== Novels ==
Nadia van Dyne has also been featured in one middle grade novel.

Title	Author	Publication date	Synopsis	ISBN
The Unstoppable Wasp: Built On Hope	Sam Maggs	May 26, 2020	Nadia Van Dyne is new to this. New to being a Super Hero, new to being a real friend and stepdaughter (to one of the founding Avengers, no less), new to running her own lab, and new to being her own person, far, far away from the clutches of the Red Room―the infamous brainwashing/assassin-training facility. She's adjusting well to all of this newness, channeling her energy into being a good friend, a good scientist, and a good Super Hero. It's taking a toll, though, and Nadia's finding that there are never quite enough hours in a day. So, when she's gifted a virtual assistant powered by the most cutting-edge A.I. technology that the world has to offer, Nadia jumps at the opportunity to "do less, experience more"―just like the advertisements say. The device works―really works. Nadia has more time to pursue her passion projects and to focus on new discoveries. But it's never quite that simple, and not everything is as it seems. This thrilling adventure finds Nadia confronting her past as she tries to shape her future, and learning that sometimes the best way to effect big change is to think small―maybe even super small.	9781368054652
