= Going to the Chapel =

- Emily, Tom, and Jesse from the cover of issue 1. Art by Lisa Sterle.

Publication information
- Publisher: Action Lab Comics
- Genre: Crime, Romantic comedy, Action
- Publication date: 2019

Creative team
- Written by: David Pepose
- Artist: Gavin Guidry
- Letterer: Ariana Maher
- Colorist: Elizabeth Kramer

Going to the Chapel is a romantic comedy crime fiction comic book by writer David Pepose and artist Gavin Guidry. Its first issue was published September 2019 by Action Lab Comics. The series follows a conflicted bride whose wedding is taken over by a gang of Elvis mask-wearing bank robbers.

== Plot ==
Going to the Chapel follows Emily Anderson, a wealthy bride grappling with cold feet on the day of her wedding to mild-mannered architect Jesse Moore. But before Emily can confess her true feelings, the ceremony is crashed by the bank-robbing Bad Elvis Gang, who are on the prowl for the Heart of Dresden, a $250 million necklace on loan for the event. But when the heist goes awry and the local sheriff's department surrounds the chapel, Emily will become the unlikely ringleader of her own hostage situation in a last-ditch attempt to escape walking down the aisle. Teaming up with head bank robber Tom, Emily must navigate the police, her dysfunctional family, and her own romantic past if she wants to get out of this chapel in one piece.

== Characters ==
- Emily is a wealthy bride who struggles with her impending nuptials to Jesse, an awkward but well-meaning architect. After discovering a surprising connection with head bank robber Tom, she chooses to play both sides of a hostage situation in order to avoid going through with her own wedding.
- Tom is the leader of the Bad Elvis Gang, a group of notorious bank robbers who have stolen millions in cash and jewelry. Yet unbeknownst to his criminal partners, Tom has a secondary objective beyond stealing the near-priceless Heart of Dresden necklace, which puts him in Emily's orbit as they both try to escape the rapidly spiraling hostage situation at St. Jude's Chapel.
- Jesse is Emily's fiancée, a quiet but sweet architect who is routinely underestimated even by his future bride. But when the chips are down, Jesse surprisingly finds himself ready to fight for Emily's life, not realizing he's the person she wants to be rescued from the most.
- Sheriff Walter Reagan is the chief law enforcement officer in Rockford County, known for shooting first and asking questions never. Relentless in his pursuit of the Bad Elvis Gang, he's also frighteningly intelligent, as he continues to dig deeper into the truth behind the hostage situation at St. Jude's Chapel.

== Reception ==
According to the review aggregator site Comic Book Roundup, Going to the Chapel has received an average rating of 8.5 out of 10. Nerdist reviewer Benjamin Bailey described the first issue of Going to the Chapel as "an absurdly good time," praising the book's "offbeat humor, ridiculous setups, and pitch-perfect pacing." Actor and standup comedian Patton Oswalt called the series "so much [expletive] fun... a down-and-dirty heist-gone-spectacularly wrong mess of a masterpiece." David Hildebrand of AiPT.com praised Going to the Chapel, saying "the story is gripping, the artwork is visually stimulating, and the narrative just oozes with style." Going to the Chapel was nominated in the 2020 Ringo Awards for Best Presentation in Design.
