= Reasonably Priced Comics =

American comic book publishing company

- Industry: Publishing
- Products: Comic books
- Website: Official website

Reasonably Priced Comics is an American publisher of comic books, known for publication of the detective series Jack Hammer and its self-titled anthology. The name is derived from the company's practice of keeping their per-issue retail price as low as they possibly can.

== History ==
Reasonably Priced Comics was founded in 2009 by Brandon Barrows and Justin Brauman with the intention of publishing comics that they, as fans, would like to read and in order to draw attention to their own work. Brauman left the nascent company shortly after over disagreements regarding their publishing model. Barrows was later joined by Phillip "Flip" Katz as editorial assistant.

The company's first title, Jack Hammer: Political Science, appeared in October 2010 and was nominated for "Best Rookie Title" in the annual Project Fanboy Awards.

Its self-titled anthology, Reasonably Priced Comics, launched in December 2010 and gained a reputation for showcasing both professional independent comics creators as well as brand-new and otherwise unknown creators.

== Titles ==
- Jack Hammer: Political Science, by Brandon Barrows and Ionic (Intended as 4-issue limited series, but only three issues published before book moved to Action Lab Comics)
- Reasonably Priced Comics, by various creators (quarterly, on-going anthology)
- SCIENCE!, by various creators (one-shot anthology)
- Truth Hurts, by Alex De-Gruchy and Rob Durham (graphic novella, scheduled to be published, but cancelled)
- Unmade, by Brandon Barrows and Johnnie Christmas (one-shot crime comic)
