= Torsobear =

Graphic novel series by Brett Uren

- Cover of the first volume of Torsobear: Yarns from Toyburg art by Hal Laren
- Creator: Brett Uren
- Date: 2014
- Publisher: Toyburg Press; Comixology

Original publication
- Published in: Outre Vol 2
- Date of publication: 2013

Torsobear is a graphic novel series authored and edited by creator Brett Uren, as well as numerous contributing writers and artist. The series is co-edited by Glenn Møane. Torsobear is an anthology format with a main story arc running alongside contributed stories. The series was devised by Brett Uren after the positive feedback he received from his experimental publication in the 2013 second volume of the Outré anthology. The main story of this noir parody focuses on Detective Ruxby Bear as he investigates the criminal goings on in the imaginary town of Toyburg.

== Volume 1: Yarns from Toyburg ==
The first volume was an experimental piece capitalising on the success of the original short story and included that work as the opening piece in the book. Uren invited contributors to pitch stories for the book which would run alongside his main theme in order to flesh out the world and provide a dramatic backstory to the environment in which these toys lived. The core of the book revolves around Ruxby Bear and his investigations into the recent Torsobear Killings. Over all there were 12 stories in this volume by a variety of contributors with cover art by Hal Laren.

- Clean Heart Dirty Paws - Story and Art by Brett Uren
- Dress To Impress - Story by Frank Martin, Art by Giles Crawford and Colours and Letters by Jon Scrivens
- Rich Toy, Poor Toy - Story by Grainne McEntee, Art by Matt Rooke and Letters by Brett Uren
- Some Assembly Required - Story by Cy Dethan, Art by Peter Mason and Letters by Nic Wilkinson
- She Sang For Buttons, She Unstitched My Heart - Story and Art by Brett Uren, Colours by Harold Saxon and Letters by Mick Schubert
- The Collector - Story by Glenn Moane, Art by Carlos Nick Zamudio, Colours by Brian Traynor and Letters by Jon Scrivens
- A New Hopelessness - Story and Art by Kieran Squires (TBH Comics, The Hammer) and Colours by Faye Harmon
- The Big Wind Up - Story by Janos Honkonen, Art by Saoirse Louise Towler and Letters by Mick Schubert
- Home Invasion - Story by Brockton McKinney and Brett Uren, Art by Brett Uren and Colours by Harold Saxon
- Sour In The Sweet - Story by Jake Young, Art by Randy Haldeman, Colours by Brett Uren and Letters by Shawn Aldridge
- Blockheads - Story and Art by John Scrivens
- We All Fall Down, Playing It The Hard Way - Story and Art by Brett Uren

Uren successfully ran a Kickstarter campaign to fund the project in July 2014 and print copies of the book were made available for purchase. Uren intended to release a digital version of the book through Comixology's Submit series but ran into copyright problems with Comixology's legal department, specifically around the A New Hopelessness story which focussed on cheap imitation toys and their place in the toy world. Comixology believed that the main protagonists bore too close a resemblance to characters owned by Disney, Lucasfilm and Marvel. Uren was required to edit the art in order to allow the work to be published. Volume 1 went live on Comixology in April 2015.

=== Reception ===
Reception for the first volume was generally positive, with the majority of reviews citing the originality of the book and its sinister tones playing a major part in its effectiveness. Good Reads says the book was high in "emotional resonance and depth". A Place to Hang Your Cape says that it is "a combination of noir-homage and toy culture" that challenges "the reader as to how far the fusion of adult themes with a child-friendly setup can be accepted. Ain’t for the faint of fluff indeed."

== Volume 2: All Stitched Up ==
The second volume in the series was released in the last quarter of 2015. Uren ran a second successful Kickstarter campaign in June 2015. Again, the central theme revolves around Ruxby Bear, who has this time been incarcerated for crimes he is innocent of, all the while in pursuit of a vicious killer who is turning toys inside out. This volume is geared up to deliver its conclusion in a third volume set for release sometime in 2016. Stories included are:

- The Switch and Stitch – Story and Art by Brett Uren
- One Small Step for Toy - Story by Frank Martin and Art by Grant Perkins
- Goodbye Kitty - Story by Grainne McEntee and Art by Lee Killeen
- Uncanny Valley of the Dolls - Story by Cy Dethan, Art by Juan Romera and Colours by Nic Wilkinson
- Stones in Glass Playsets – Story by Brett Uren, Art by Giles Crawford and Letters by Mick Schubert
- A Tale of Woe from De-Fluff Row – Story and Art by Edward R. Norden
- The Cult of the Collector - Story by Glenn Møane and Art by Sage M Coffey
- ...But when Geppetto talks to you - Story by Janos Honkonen and Art by Carlos Nick Zamudio
- Broken Soldier - story by Jake Young and Art by Dave Windett
- Remade in the Rough House – Story by Brett Uren, Art by Giles Crawford and Letters by Mick Schubert
- Play of the Dead - Story by Kieran Squires, Art by Ben Ling and Colours and Letters by Charlie Hogg
- The Law Above – Story by Pete Rogers and Art by Mike Motz
- Semper Fidelis - Story and Art by Kieran Squires and Colours and Letters by Charlie Hogg
- Action Gal – Story, Colours and Letters by Jon Scrivens and Art by Phil Buckenham
- Shooter Shattered – Story by Jimmy Furlong and Art by Andrew Hartmann
- What Josie Said – Story by Ronald Montgomery and Art by Ashley Ribblett
- Someone Else's Rules – Story by Brett Uren, Art by Giles Crawford and Letters by Mick Schubert

=== Reception ===
Reception for the second volume was again positive.

== Volume 3: Back on the Blocks ==
The third and final volume concludes Ruxby's story as well as tying up smaller arcs from some supporting characters built up over the three volumes. A Kickstarter campaign is due to run during September 2016 with an estimated released date of December 2016, bringing the trilogy to a close. Cover is again provided by Hal Laren. Distribution for this volume will be handled by Uren as well as Source Point Press for a wider international audience. Stories included are:

- The Saturday Morning Wars – by Kieran Squires and Gustavo Jimenez (running over five parts throughout the book)
- The Dearly Deflated - by Brett Uren and Faye Harmon
- Red Flag, Black Flag, False Flag - by Janos Honkonen and Saoirse Louise Towler
- The Old Ways - by Mike Orvis and Cassie Gregory
- Just a Walk Down the Blocks – by Brett Uren and Faye Harmon
- One Giant Robot for Toykind – by Frank Martin and Yen Quach
- And the World Smiles With You - by Brett Uren
- Snaplok and the Beautiful Machine - by Cy Dethan, Carlos Zamudio and Nic Wilkinson
- Through the Eye of the Needle - by Brett Uren
- The Rise of Stretcho Savage – by Glenn Møane and Renzo Rodriguez
- The Last Ballad of Carly - by Edward R. Norden and Charlie Hogg
- Childish Things – by Brett Uren and Stuart Uren
