= TKO Studios =

American comics publisher

- Founded: 2017
- Founders: Tze Chun Salvatore Simeone
- Country of origin: United States
- Headquarters location: Los Angeles
- Distribution: Simon & Schuster
- Key people: Tze Chun; Salvatore Simeone
- Official website: tkopresents.com

TKO Studios is an American comics publisher founded by Tze Chun & Salvatore Simeone in 2017.

== History ==
TKO Studios was founded in 2017 by Tze Chun & Salvatore Simeone. Unlike the majority of other American comic book publishers, TKO sold their books directly to consumers and comic book shops, completely bypassing distributor Diamond Comic Distributors. In 2020, TKO Studios signed a deal Ingram Publisher Services / Publishers Group West to handle book distribution.

The first wave of books launched December 10, 2018 and contained four miniseries: The Fearsome Doctor Fang by Tze Chun, Mike Weiss, and Dan McDaid; Goodnight Paradise by Joshua Dysart and Alberto Ponticelli; Sara by Garth Ennis and Steve Epting; and The 7 Deadly Sins by Tze Chun and Artyom Trakhanov. Their first wave of books were all released in three formats; a trade paperback collection, a box set of single issues, and digitally in single or collected editions. During their initial release the first issue of each series was available free digitally so consumers and retailers could preview the series before purchasing the rest.

The second wave launched on October 28, 2019, using the same release format for another four miniseries: The Banks by Roxane Gay and Ming Doyle; Pound for Pound by Natalie Chaidez and Andy Belanger; and Sentient by Jeff Lemire and Gabriel Walta.

In 2020, Sentient became the first title from TKO to be nominated for an Eisner Award, when the series picked up a nomination for Best Limited Series.

The third wave of books launched on November 9, 2020, with three comic book miniseries: “Lonesome Days Savage Nites” by Salvatore Simeone and Steve Niles The Pull by Steve Orlando and Ricardo López Ortiz; and Redfork by Alex Paknadel and Nil Vandrell. In addition the three miniseries, TKO released an illustrated prose collection Blood Like Garnets by Leigh Harlen with illustrations by Maria Nguygen and a new series of one-shot comic books under the banner TKO Shorts with three titles Seeds of Eden, The Father of All Things and Night Train.

In 2021 Lonesome Days Savage Nites was a finalist for a Bram Stoker Award

== TKO Rogue ==
In November 2021, TKO announced TKO Rogue, an imprint focused on prose works. The first two books from this imprint will be Brood X and One Eye Open, coming out January 2022.

== Published works ==
=== Comics miniseries ===
| Release date | Title | Story | Art | Cover(s) | Colors | Letters | Miniseries boxed set | Trade paperback |
|---|---|---|---|---|---|---|---|---|
| WAVE ONE; December 10, 2018 | The Fearsome Doctor Fang | Tze Chun; Mike Weiss | Dan McDaid | | Daniela Miwa | Steve Wands | ISBN 9781952203015 | ISBN 9781732748514 |
| WAVE ONE; December 10, 2018 | Goodnight Paradise | Joshua Dysart | Alberto Ponticelli | | Giulia Brusco | Steve Wands | ISBN 9781952203022 | ISBN 9781732748521 |
| WAVE ONE; December 10, 2018 | Sara | Garth Ennis | Steve Epting | | Elizabeth Breitweiser | Rob Steen | ISBN 9781952203039 | ISBN 9781732748538 |
| WAVE ONE; December 10, 2018 | The 7 Deadly Sins | Tze Chun | Artyom Trakhanov | | Giulia Brusco | Jared K. Fletcher | ISBN 9781952203008 | ISBN 9781732748507 |
| WAVE TWO; October 28, 2019 | The Banks | Roxane Gay | Ming Doyle | | Jordie Bellaire | Ariana Maher | ISBN 9781952203060 | ISBN 9781732748583 |
| WAVE TWO; October 28, 2019 | Pound for Pound | Natalie Chaidez | Andy Belanger | | Daniela Miwa | Ariana Maher | | ISBN 9781952203046 |
| WAVE TWO; October 28, 2019 | Sentient | Jeff Lemire | Gabriel Walta | | | Steve Wands | ISBN 9781952203077 | ISBN 9781732748590 |
| WAVE THREE; November 9, 2020 | Redfork | Alex Paknadel | Nil Vendrell | | Giulia Brusco | Ryan Ferrier | ISBN 9781952203138 | ISBN 9781952203091 |
| WAVE THREE; November 9, 2020 | The Pull | Steve Orlando | Ricardo Lopez Ortiz | | Triona Farell | Thomas Mauer | ISBN 9781952203145 | ISBN 9781952203107 |
| WAVE THREE; November 9, 2020 | Lonesome Days, Savage Nights: The Manning Files Vol. 1 | Salvatore Simeone | Szymon Kudranski | | | Thomas Mauer | ISBN 978-1-952203-11-4 | ISBN 978-1-952203-11-4 |

=== Comics shorts ===
| Release date | Title | Story | Art | Cover | Colors | Letters | Collected in |
|---|---|---|---|---|---|---|---|
| WAVE ONE; November 9, 2020 | TKO Shorts #1: Seeds of Eden | Liana Kangas; Joe Corallo | Paul Azaceta | | | Jeff Powell | TKO Presents; Tales of Terror; ISBN 9781952203565 (TPB); November 15, 2021 |
| WAVE ONE; November 9, 2020 | TKO Shorts #2: Father of All Things | Sebastian Girner | Baldemar Rivas | | | Steve Wands | TKO Presents; Tales of Terror; ISBN 9781952203565 (TPB); November 15, 2021 |
| WAVE ONE; November 9, 2020 | TKO Shorts #3: Night Train | Steve Foxe | Lisandro Estherren | | Patricio Delpeche | Steve Wands | TKO Presents; Tales of Terror; ISBN 9781952203565 (TPB); November 15, 2021 |
| WAVE TWO; February 28, 2021 | TKO Shorts #4: Dame from the Dark | Rob Pilkington | Kit Mills | | | Ariana Maher | TKO Presents; Tales of Terror; ISBN 9781952203565 (TPB); November 15, 2021 |
| WAVE TWO; February 28, 2021 | TKO Shorts #5: Hand Me Down | Alex Paknadel | Jen Hickman | | | Simon Bowland | TKO Presents; Tales of Terror; ISBN 9781952203565 (TPB); November 15, 2021 |
| WAVE TWO; February 28, 2021 | TKO Shorts #6: Killiamsburg | Erick Freitas | Jelena Đorđević-Maksimović | | | Steve Wands | TKO Presents; Tales of Terror; ISBN 9781952203565 (TPB); November 15, 2021 |
| WAVE THREE; June 1, 2021 | TKO Shorts #7: River of Sin | Kelly Williams | Chas! Pangburn | | | | TKO Presents; Tales of Terror; ISBN 9781952203565 (TPB); November 15, 2021 |
| WAVE THREE; June 1, 2021 | TKO Shorts #8: Roofstompers | Alex Paknadel | Ian McEwan | | | Hassan Otsmane-Elhaou | TKO Presents; Tales of Terror; ISBN 9781952203565 (TPB); November 15, 2021 |
| WAVE THREE; June 1, 2021 | TKO Shorts #9: The Walk | Michael Moreci | Jesús Hervás | | | Hassan Otsmane-Elhaou | TKO Presents; Tales of Terror; ISBN 9781952203565 (TPB); November 15, 2021 |

=== Prose novels ===
| Release date | Title | Story | Art | Cover | Colors | ISBN |
|---|---|---|---|---|---|---|
| November 9, 2020 | Blood Like Garnets | Leigh Harlen | Maria Nguyen | Maria Nguyen; Jared K. Fletcher | Maria Nguyen | 9781952203732 (TPB) |
| January 11, 2022 | Brood X | Joshua Dysart | M.K. Perker | | | 9781952203282 (TPB) |
| January 11, 2022 | One Eye Open | Alex Grecian | Andrea Mutti | | | 9781952203299 (TPB) |

=== Original graphic novels ===
| Release date | Title | Story | Art | Cover(s) | Colors | Letters | ISBN |
|---|---|---|---|---|---|---|---|
| June 1, 2021 (preorders); July 6, 2021 (retail) | Djeliya | Juni Ba | | | | | 9781952203244 (TPB); 9781952203275 (HC) |
| June 1, 2021 (preorders); July 6, 2021 (retail) | Scales & Scoundrels – Book 1: Where Dragons Wander^{1} | Sebastian Girner | Galaad | | | Jeff Powell | 9781952203220 (TPB); 9781952203251 (HC) |
| June 1, 2021 (preorders); July 6, 2021 (retail) | Scales & Scoundrels – Book 2: The Festival of Life^{2} | Sebastian Girner | Galaad | | | Jeff Powell | 9781952203237 (TPB); 9781952203268 (HC) |
| November 15, 2021 (preorders) | Graveneye | Sloane Leong | Anna Bowles | | | | 9781952203176 (TPB) |

^{1}Originally published by Image Comics in 2017–2018 as Scales & Scoundrels #1-10

^{2}Originally published by Image Comics in 2018 as Scales & Scoundrels #11-12 plus 250 pages of original content.

== Media adaptions ==
In August 2020 The Banks was put into development as a feature film by production company MACRO with Gay returning to pen the script with Charles D. King, Poppy Hanks, Jelani Johnson, Tze Chun and Jatin Thakker serving as producers.
