= Blue Comics =

Brazilian publishing company

Blue Comics is a Brazilian publisher of comics and related media, known for being the first (in Brazil) to have its own shared universe.

The company was created by Micaías Ramos in 2006.

== History ==
In 2006, Blue Comics started with the name "Tacape Editora", founded by Micaías Ramos. The name "Blue Comics" came from a small producer of "zines" bought by Micaías Ramos in 2015, but only in 2016, the publisher started to use the name "Blue Comics e Entretenimento".

In 2016, the publisher began to renew its shared universe. bringing a more "dark and realistic" mood to your comic books.

In 2020, Blue comics created the "Força HQB" campaign, the idea was to bring together businessmen to (financially) support companies linked to the Brazilian comic book market, which were suffering because of the crisis (caused by the global pandemic).
