= Finix Comics =

German comic book publishing company

Finix Comics is a German comic publisher and a cooperative with the goal to continue prematurely cancelled comic-series in Germany.

== Founding ==
Finix Comics was founded in November 2007 by comic-enthusiasts unhappy with the situation of the publishing history of comic-series in Germany. The comic-market in Germany is not as distinct as, for example, in the United States or Japan, nor are comics considered an independently art-form or a serious entertainment medium as in France or Belgium. Therefore, comic series are more often than not prematurely cancelled in their German-language adaption; sometimes in the midst of a storyline, while the original series continues well beyond this. Existing original material thus gets not adapted further, and readers of the series are forced to buy the original comics.
For this reason, several fans grouped together and formed Finix Comics (Finix, or Finis is French for finished), to continue cancelled series. To this goal, the members of Finix obtain the rights to adapt the original material, and translate, letter, print and distribute any missing issues, continuing the series in Germany.

== Publications ==
Starting in 2008, Finix translated, lettered and released more than 315 titles, mainly Franco-Belgian comics like Les pionniers du nouveau monde by J.-F. Charles, Maryse Charles and Ersel; Quetzalcoatl by Jean-Yves Mitton; Buddy Longway by Derib; or Vasco by Gilles Chaillet and Frédéric Toublanc. In 2009 the imprint Edition Solitaire was founded; Solitaire is dedicated to exclusive high-quality albums not published in German before.

== Titles ==
=== 2008 ===
- Les pionniers du nouveau monde (German: Die Pioniere der neuen Welt); by J.-F. Charles, Maryse Charles and Ersel
- L'impératrice rouge (German: Die Rote Kaiserin); by Jean Dufaux and Philippe Adamov
- Mortepierre (German: Die Füchsin); by Brice Tarval, Mohamed Aouamri and Rafa Garres
- Aberzen (German: Abersen); by Marc N'Guessan
- Violine (German: Violetta); by Tronchet, Fabrice Tarrin and Jean-Marc Krings

=== 2009 ===
- Tatiana K. (German: Tatjana K.); by François Corteggiani and Félix Meynet
- Quetzalcoatl (German: Quetzalcoatl); by Jean-Yves Mitton
- Thomas Noland (German: Thomas Noland); by Daniel Pecquer and Franz
- Les innommables (German: Helden ohne Skrupel); by Yann Le Pennetier and Didier Conrad
- Malheig (German: Malheig); by Eric Stalner and Jean-Marc Stalner
- Le vent des dieux (German: Der Wind der Götter); by Philippe Adamov and Patrick Cothias
- Gorn (German: Gorn); by Tiburce Oger

=== 2010 ===
- Le chant d'Excalibur (German: Excalibur); by Christophe Arleston and Eric Hübsch
- Lester Cockney (German: Lester Cockney); by Franz
- Buddy Longway (German: Buddy Longway); by Derib
- Les cosmonautes du futur (German: Die Kosmonauten der Zukunft); by Lewis Trondheim and Manu Larcenet
- Le fléau des dieux (German: Die Geissel der Götter); by Aleksa Gajić and Valérie Mangin
- Colby (German: Colby); by Greg and Michel Blanc-Dumont

=== 2011 ===
- Horologiom (German: Horologiom); by Fabrice Lebeault
- Shamrock Song (German: Shamrock Song); by Franz
- La famille Martin (German: Die Müllers); by Pierre Seron
- Vasco (German: Vasco); by Gilles Chaillet and Frédéric Toublanc
- Le serment de l'ambre (German: Der Schwur des Ambers); by Dieter and Étienne Le Roux
- Black Mary (German: Black Mary); by Erwan Fagès and David Chauvel
- Spoon & White (German: Spoon & White); by Yann Le Pennetier, Jean Léturgie and Simon Léturgie

=== 2012 ===
- Masquerouge (German: Der Rote Falke); by Patrick Cothias, André Juillard and Marco Venanzi
- Petit d'homme (German: Winzling); by Crisse and Marc N'Guessan
- Hauteville House (German: Hauteville House); by Fred Duval and Thierry Gioux

=== 2013 ===
- Lou Cale (German: Lou Cale); by Éric Warnauts and Guy Raives
- Chroniques de la Lune Noire (German: Die Chroniken des schwarzen Mondes); by François Marcela-Froideval and Fabrice Angleraud
- Le Décalogue (German: Zehn Gebote); by Frank Giroud, Luc Révillon, Béhé, Michel Faure, Alain Mounier, Bruno Rocco, Lucien Rollin and TBC
- Jérôme K. Jérôme Bloche (German: Jackie Kottwitz); by Alain Dodier, Serge Le Tendre and Pierre Makyo
- Troll (German: Troll); by Jean David Morvan, Joann Sfar and Olivier Boiscommun
- L'Esprit de Warren (German: Warrens Schwur); by Luc Brunschwig and Servain

=== 2014 ===
- I.R.$. (German: I.R.$.); by Stephen Desberg and Bernard Vrancken

=== Edition Solitaire ===
- Le mangeur d'histoires (German: Mit fremder Feder); by Fabrice Lebeault (2009)
- Quintos (German: Quintos); by Andreas and Isabelle Cochet (2010)
- Quand souffle le vent (German: Wer Wind sät); by Laurent Galandon and Cyril Bonin (2010)
- Cryozone (German: Cryozone); by Thierry Cailleteau and Denis Bajram (2011)
- Petit miracle (German: Kleines Wunder); by Valérie Mangin and Griffo (2011)
