= Vimanika Comics =

Indian comics company

- Parent company: Vimanika Edutainment Pvt Ltd
- Status: Active
- Founded: 2008; 18 years ago
- Founder: Karan Vir Arora
- Country of origin: INDIA
- Fiction genres: Hindu mythology
- Official website: www.vimanikacomics.com

Vimanika Comics is an Indian comics company which creates comics graphic novels based on Hindu mythology. The company also has its presence in United Kingdom as Vimanika Comics UK. The comics are available at all leading book stores in India.

== History ==
Vimanika Comics was the first of its kind Indian company to launch a graphic novel in India and United States. Vimanika comic books and graphic novels are based on Indian mythology. Vimanika Comics is a part of Vimanika Edutainment Pvt Ltd, which aims to create stories based on Indian, Asian, and Celtic mythology. The stories created are not confined to text but are also created in animated films, live-action films, games, merchandising, and toys. Vimanika was a sponsor for the Comic Con India held at Delhi in 2015. Vimanika has tied up with apparel firm Kapsons for the sale of Vimanika T-shirts in northern India. As well Vimanika Comics has tied up with Krome stores to cater to the graphic T-shirts in Ludhiana.

== Popular Works ==
- Moksha
- I am Kalki
- Dashavatar- Incarnations of Vishnu
- Shiva -The Immortal
- The Sixth- Legend Of Karna
- Durga - Legends

== Awards ==
- Vimanika Comics 'Moksha' won the Golden Cursor CNBC TV 18 and animation awards for the Best Comics in 2009.
- The founder Mr.Karan won the ‘Best Young Entrepreneur' award at the Third Indira International Summit.
- The graphic novel I am Kalki was the winner under the category of 'Best Cover' at the inaugural Comic Con India Awards 2012.
