= Panaramic Entertainment =

Panaramic Entertainment, Ltd.
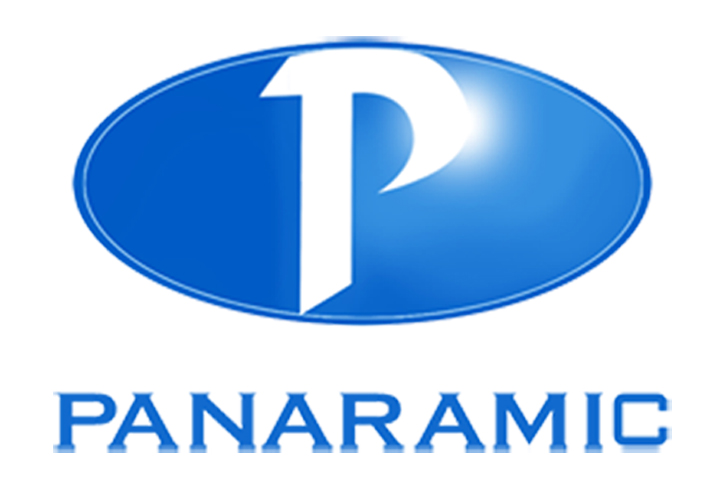
- Industry: Media, entertainment and publishing
- Founded: August 2007
- Founders: Tunji Anjorin, Oriteme Banigo, Rotimi Anjorin
- Headquarters: Lagos, Nigeria, Nigeria
- Key people: Tunji Anjorin (president, editor-in-chief), Oriteme Banigo (vice president), Rotimi Anjorin, Gbubemi D. Okorodudu, Rotimi Dawodu, Segun Edu
- Products: Comics
- Website: www.panaramiconline.com

Panaramic Entertainment, Ltd., commonly referred to as Panaramic, is a Nigerian comic book publisher. The company was founded in 2007 by Tunji Anjorin, Rotimi Anjorin, and Oriteme Banigo. The company was created to develop, produce, and distribute comic books for the Nigerian reading public and to export these comics as local content to international markets.

Panaramic's premier title is Okiojo's Chronicles: Promoting & Preserving the Nigerian History and Culture. Okiojo's Chronicles is marketed as a mix between education and entertainment expressed in comic book format.

== History ==
=== Founding ===
Panaramic was founded while the founders were attending various universities both at home in Nigeria and abroad. Due to the lack of proper infrastructure within the Nigerian economy, comic book production has been largely considered a difficult feat to achieve. Production of consecutive content was viewed as one of the industry's major problems.

The company spent seven years developing a business model that could succeed in the initially harsh Nigerian business terrain; this included developing the first years' content of Okiojo's Chronicles (four issues) and securing partnerships with the Lagos State Government and Sweet Sensation, Ltd., a Nigerian restaurant chain.

=== Launch ===
Panaramic saw its official launch to the public in July 2014 when they hosted a CSR event called "Panaramic - Roll Out". At the event, which was held at King's College Lagos, 560 copies of Okiojo's Chronicles (Oduduwa: The Story of the Yoruba) were given to the JSS One class of 2014 for free. The school was the alma mater of a number of Panaramic's board and team members, and the launch was intended partially as a gesture of giving back to their school.

Okiojo's Chronicles was released for sale to the public in October 2014, along with a 100-hour free download on the Panaramic website.

== Competitors ==
Super Strikaz is the longest-running comic book in Nigeria. It is a global, South African-licensed football comic book, which has been running since 1999 and has experienced much success over the years.

The second most noteworthy comic book in terms of its success in the Nigerian market is Indomitables, produced and distributed by the Indian-owned Nigerian food giant Indomie Noodles. The comic series was released in June 2014 and distributed as an additional feature within the company's boxes of noodles.

== Titles ==
Okiojo's Chronicles: Okiojo, which in literary tradition refers to an all-knowing and wise man, narrates stories that educate readers about Nigeria's history and culture. The series was scheduled to be released quarterly, with its first year to run from October 2014 until September 2015. Its volumes include Oduduwa: The Story of the Yoruba; 1897: The Benin Kingdom; Queen Amina Part I (The Seed); and Queen Amina Part II (The Warrior).

Panaramic has plans to launch a superhero comic titled Omoboy. Tunji Anjorin summarized the plot of the series in a 2009 interview: "When the Calibo twins (Sunny and Sarah) made a single stance to oppose injustice, their lives were never the same again. Granted paranormal abilities at birth, Sunny constantly faces threats wherever disaster sets foot as Omoboy, the physical embodiment of Justice. Sarah, his female counterpart, aids him as his indoor strategist, accomplice and confidant. Together they face life as a pair of young teenagers in a future Lagos."

== Distribution and partnerships ==
Panaramic secured a distribution partnership with Sweet Sensation Confectionery, Ltd., a fast food restaurant chain located in Lagos, Nigeria. This partnership makes Panaramic comic books available at all 30 of the chain's outlets in Lagos. Panaramic is the second comic book company to achieve such distribution in Nigeria after Super Strikas, and it is the first Nigerian comic book company to do so.

Okiojo's Chronicles comes with an advertisement for Cliqlite, a call and data package from the telecommunications company Etisalat.
