= Jeremy Whitley =

American comic writer

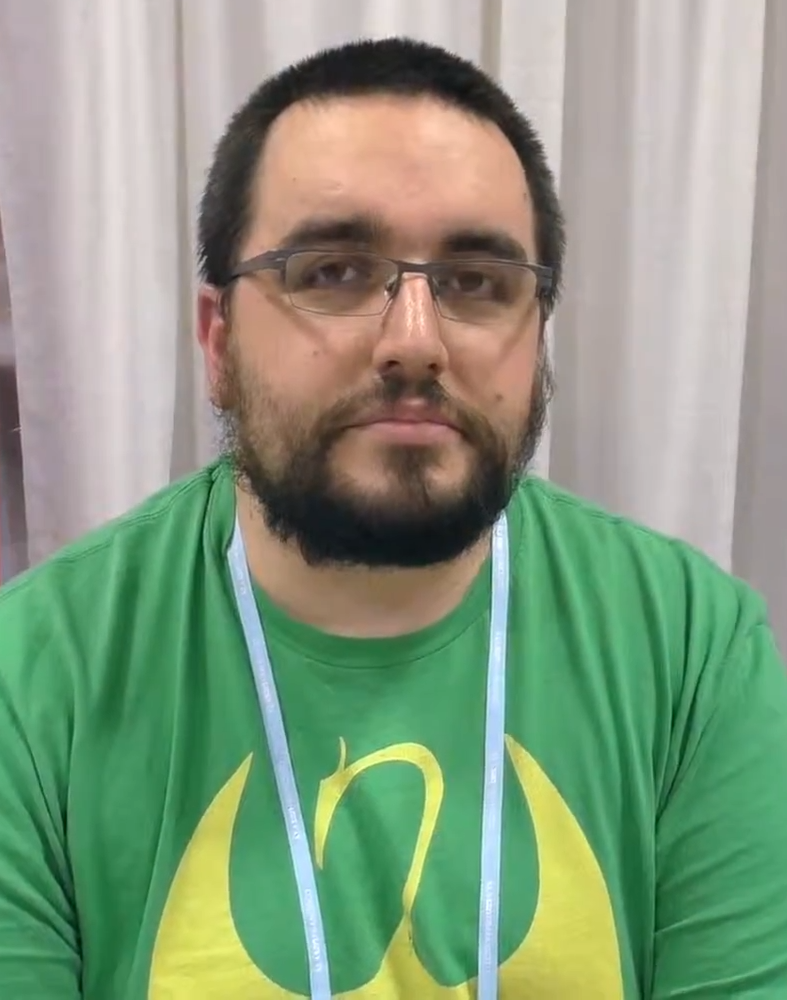
- Whitley in 2015
- Born: August 19, 1983 (age 43) La Mesa, California, U.S.
- Areas: Writer, editor, publisher, producer
- Notable works: Rainbow Brite; The Unstoppable Wasp; Aromancing of Gwendolyn Poole; Navigating with You

Jeremy Whitley is an American comic book writer and artist, known as the creator and writer of the Marvel Comics series The Unstoppable Wasp, centred on Nadia van Dyne, and Aromancing of Gwendolyn Poole, centred on Gwen Poole, of the Glyph-winning, Eisner-nominated series Princeless, and as a major writer of IDW Publishing, especially the My Little Pony: Friendship is Magic comic franchise.

== Early life ==
Jeremy Whitley was born in California and raised in Livermore, California and in North Carolina. He became interested in comics through his father, who would walk him to their local Livermore comic book shop, Fact, Fiction, and Fantasy. From an early age Whitley began collecting both comics and the Marvel Masterpieces trading cards, and wrote and illustrated his first comic when he was in the third grade. He attended the University of North Carolina in Chapel Hill, and graduated with a bachelor's degree in English with a minor in Creative Writing.

== Career ==
In 2011, Whitley created the comic series, Princeless, a series about a young black princess determined to break the norms of what a princess should be. According to Whitley, Princeless was conceived thus:

"Princeless came from a confluence of issues I had. I’ve always had a lot of close geek girl friends and I’m always looking for strong female characters in comics to share with them. I think there just aren’t enough. When I married my wife, I got to know her younger sisters and some of her cousins. As young girls of color none of them had ever picked up a comic book (except my wife) and why should they? I can count on one hand the number of black women you can find on your comic book stand right now, not to mention the number who are positive portrayals. The same holds true for women of color in fantasy stories. I wanted my daughter to have comic books she could love the same way I’ve loved mine. Not to mention, I’m a little leery about the princess culture and what it actually teaches girls."

Also in 2011, Whitley was hired as the Director of Marketing and Public Relations at Action Lab Entertainment, focusing on the solicitations, reviews, press releases, and interviews for new releases. Whitley has also acted as a co-writer for 2012 digital mini-series "GlobWorld" and the current series "NFL RushZone". In addition, Whitley has also been a regular writer for IDW's My Little Pony: Friendship is Magic and My Little Pony: Friends Forever.

From 2016 to 2019, Whitley was the principal creator and writer of the Marvel Comics series The Unstoppable Wasp, across two runs of eight and ten issues respectively. His work on The Unstoppable Wasp received attention for "bringing a nuanced understanding understanding of mental health, and bipolar disorder in particular" to Marvel comics, also drawing praise from bipolar advocates, and mental health professionals, as well as Aromancing of Gwendolyn Poole, exploring the concept of queerplatonic relationship-seeking aroace people, published in 2023.

== Personal life ==
Whitley currently lives with his wife Alicia and daughters Zuri and Amara in Raleigh, North Carolina. He identifies as being on the asexual spectrum.

== Awards and honors ==
Whitley's Princeless won three Glyph Comics Awards in 2012, and it was also nominated for two Eisner awards.

Year	Nominated work	Category	Award	Result	Notes	Ref.
2012	Princeless	Story of the Year	Glyph Comics Awards	Won	with M. Goodwin	
2012	Princeless	Writer of the Year	Glyph Comics Awards	Won		
2012	Adrienne, Princeless	Best Female Character	Glyph Comics Awards	Won	with M. Goodwin	
2012	Princeless #3	Best Single Issue or One-Shot	Eisner Awards	Nominated	with M. Goodwin	
2012	Princeless	Best Publication for Kids (Ages 8–12)	Eisner Awards	Nominated	with M. Goodwin	
2019	The Unstoppable Wasp: Unlimited, vol. 1: Fix Everything	Great Graphic Novels for Teens 2019	Young Adult Library Services Association	Included	with Gurihiru	
2020	The Unstoppable Wasp: Unlimited, vol. 2: Unstoppable!	Great Graphic Novels for Teens 2020	Young Adult Library Services Association	Included	with Elsa Charretier, Veronic Fish, Ro Stein, Ted Brandt	
2025	Navigating with You	Best Young Adult Book	Harvey Awards	Nominated		
2025	Navigating with You	Best Single Issue or Story	Ringo Awards	Nominated		
2025	Navigating with You	Mike Morgan & Larry Romans Children's & Young Adult Literature Award	American Library Association	Honor		
