= Violent Messiahs =

Violent Messiahs: Book of Job cover by Travis Smith

Violent Messiahs is an American comic book series created by Joshua Dysart and William O'Neil and published by Image Comics. The comic takes place in a fictional city known as Rankor Island, and focused on the Rankor PD's attempts to bring in Rankor's vigilantes. The most prominent characters are Lt. Cheri Major and Detective Ernest Houston, the two cops leading the investigations, Family Man, a serial killer who attacks bad parents, and Citizen Pain, a giant, dark figure who was the most prominent vigilante in Rankor.

== Publication history ==
The original black and white comic was drawn by O'Neill, written by Dysart and published by Hurricane Press in 1997. Only one issue, of what was to be a 3-issue story arc, hit the shelves, with the second issue scrapped by Jan Utstein, the Editor-in-Chief. Years later, Image Comics bought the rights to the series, and the original issue was remade, this time with arts by Tone Rodriguez, and color by Travis Smith. Joshua Dysart expanded the script into an 8-issue arc.

In 2001 Image published Genesis, a black and white trade paperback containing a prologue to the first story arc; the original O'Neill comic. It is the work with combination of pages from his unpublished second issue; and clips from Rodriguez's sketchbook. The prologue story, originally released as Wizard Magazine's 1/2 issue, touches on the four main players of Book Of Job. It begins with the explanation of how Cheri came to be transferred from New York Police Department to heading the Rankor Island Violent Messiah Taskforce, as well as the origin of her "badass mother fucker hat". From there, it segues to Ernest's first interaction with Family Man, and how he was promoted against his will despite his bungling of the situation. Finally Job is shown and what can be inferred as the moment he became aware of Cheri is revealed. This section reprints Tone's penciled pages, no ink, no color.

Book of Job, a collection of the first story arc (issues 1–8), was published in 2002. The initial serials were published beginning in 2000. The story opens and quickly introduces the four protagonists before. Throughout the story arc they are slowly developed and fleshed out, particularly Cheri and Job who seem to be standard stereotypes when the story begins but have been expanded beyond that by the end. As the story progresses it turns into a melange of mystery, horror, romance, superhero/scifi, and conspiracy.

Cheri is heading the Violent Messiahs vigilante taskforce for the Rankor Island Police (R.I.P) and is charged with bringing in the serial killer dubbed Citizen Pain by the media. Ernest Huston is the detective charged with bringing in the Family Man. Their investigations collide and as they begin to look deeper the reader finds that not only are the killers they hunt connected but the police officers are being pulled into a far reaching conspiracy.

Poetry is a major theme within the book. Both Job and Jeremiah (Citizen Pain and Family Man respectively) either quote or write it in the story and directly mention that it was important in their upbringing.

"Lamenting Pain", the second story arc (4 issues) follows up by featuring the characters living in the aftermath of the original series. The story focuses on Lt. Cheri Major as she tracks down a new masked vigilante, named Scalpel, while battling her own inner demons. The fetish scene is featured prominently throughout the work just as poetry was in the first. The events of "Lamenting Pain" begin one month after Book of Job. Both Cheri and Huston have been suspended and are under investigation due to the events of the previous story. Cheri is undergoing mandatory psychological counseling and Huston has not left his apartment in three weeks. Cheri is asked to take her badge back in order to find out about Scalpel who leaves her name carved on the bodies of her victims. More of Cheri's backstory is revealed and both officers once again face the conspiracy introduced in the first story-arc.

Violent Messiahs: The Book of Job was re-released by IDW Publishing in 2008. A Violent Messiahs: Lamenting Pain trade paperback was also published by IDW in February 2009. Originally published as Violent Messiahs issues #9–12, this collection features the complete second story arc, the rare Wizard Exclusive Prequel, a sketchbook of designs, and a brand new nine-page Citizen Pain story.

== Critical reception ==
Book of Job has been nominated for three awards the Harvey Award, the Wizard Fan Award, and the Eisner's Russ Manning Award.

== In popular culture ==
In season two episode thirteen of the TV show 90210, Ivy reads an issue of Violent Messiahs during the scene where Naomi comes along to give her her present. Dixon is also reading #2 Lamenting Pain in episode twenty of season two.
