= Action Lab Comics =

American comic book publisher

Action Lab Entertainment / Action Lab Comics
- Industry: Publishing
- Founded: October 2010; 16 years ago
- Founder: Shawn Pryor, Dave Dwonch, Shawn Gabborin
- Headquarters: Pittsburgh, Pennsylvania, United States
- Key people: Shawn Pryor, Dave Dwonch, Shawn Gabborin, Chad Cicconi
- Products: Comic books
- Website: Official website

Action Lab Entertainment (also known as Action Lab Comics or ALE), is an American publisher of comic books, known primarily for the publication of the all-ages fantasy title Princeless, as well as a wide range of titles from all genres. The company is also known for embracing digital comics and is recognized as one of the first publishers to release a digital-only Free Comic Book Day title.

== History ==
Action Lab Entertainment was founded in October 2010 by Shawn Pryor, Dave Dwonch and Shawn Gabborin. All three of the founding members had prior experience in self-publishing and had worked together to publish small press comic books under Pryor's PKD Media imprint.

Action Lab's first release was Back In The Day, an original graphic novel written by Dave Dwonch, with art by Daniel J. Logan (an artist who had also previously worked with PKD Media), and released in February, 2011. This inaugural publication was available for pre-order through Discount Comic Book Service and marked the company's first foray into nationwide distribution.

During the same time period as Back In The Day's launch, Pryor ran a Kickstarter fundraiser to both promote and gather funds for the company's second title, Fracture, described as a "superhero dark comedy"; Fracture was written by Shawn Gabborin, with art by Chad Cicconi and Dave Dwonch. Pryor's campaign surpassed its funding goal by nearly 10%, allowing Action Lab to schedule the book's first issue for a July, 2011 release; the release would also mark Action Lab's entrance into the direct market.

In October 2011, the company released two books: the horror-suspense one-shot Snowed In, written by Shawn Gabborin with art by Rick Lundeen, and the first issue of the all-ages fantasy title Princeless, written by Jeremy Whitley, with art by Mia Goodwin. Princeless, featuring the teenage Princess Adrienne (a princess who decides that she does not need a prince to rescue her and becomes a hero in her own right), became a major hit for the company, garnering five nominations in the 2012 Glyph Comics Awards ("Story of the Year", "Best Writer", "Best Artist", "Best Female Character" and "Best Cover") and two nominations at the 2012 Eisner Awards ("Best Single Issue" and "Best Publication for Kids"), giving the company both industry and worldwide recognition.

Also in October, 2011, Action Lab launched Globworld, its first digital-only title, based on the MMORPG specifically designed for children. This release also marked the company's first use of licensed characters and was also its first cross-company tie in.

February, 2012, marked Action Lab's largest single-month expansion since the publisher's inception, in which they released two graphic novels and a trade paperback: the graphic novels Exo-1 and the Rock-Solid Steelbots, with story and art by Daniel J. Logan, and script by Shawn Pryor, and Monsters Are Just Like Us, with story and art by SuperUgly, and Space-Time Condominum, a trade paperback collecting the first "season" of Dave Dwonch's webcomic of the same name. All three were released as part of the "Signature Series" line, which includes individual numbering and hand-signatures for each copy. Action Lab also announced at this time that it had taken over the publication of the series Jack Hammer, written by Brandon Barrows with art by Ionic, from the small-press publisher Reasonably Priced Comics, and that it would be part of the "Signature Series".

Action Lab partnered with the National Football League to release NFL Rush Zone, a line of comic books based on the NFL Rush Zone: Guardians of the Core. The first issue was released digitally during Super Bowl XLVII

In 2021, Action Lab was the subject of numerous claims of late payments and predatory contracts.

In February 2022 a civil class-action lawsuit was filed against Action Lab by 40+ contracted comic book creators, claiming "lateness, lack of communication, non-payment, lack of statements, changing publishing plans, lack of agreed marketing" among other failures to meet contractual obligations.

In August 2023 the class-action lawsuit was dismissed by the United States District Court Western District Of Pennsylvania at the request of the involved parties, then in February 2024 it was refiled in Alleghany County Court and dismissed again. As reported by the website "Bleeding Cool News": "Comic book attorney Gamal Hennessey replied, "The presiding judge dismissed the suit on the grounds that too many of the contractual agreements submitted in the case had different terms,". Legal representative Michael Levitz told Bleeding Cool, "The case was dismissed on a technicality. The individual creators can still pursue their claims, just not as a class action, because there are different versions of the publishing agreement and different forms of damages. We are contemplating our next steps, as many creators are willing to pursue their cases separately.""

After the lawsuits were filed, Action Lab immediately ceased publication of all series and their official website has gone defunct, now leading to a page advertising the webhost.

== Titles ==
- Amerikarate
- Going to the Chapel (Comic) - Written by David Pepose, Art by Gavin Guidry. Four-issue limited series, released September 2019 - February 2020.
- Princeless - Written by Jeremy Whitley, Art by Mia Goodwin. Four-issue limited series, released October 2011 - February 2012.
- Spencer & Locke - Written by David Pepose, Art by Jorge Santiago Jr. Four-issue limited series, released April 2017 - August 2017.
- Zoe Dare
- NEW MEN - Written by Murewa Ayodele, Art by Dotun Akande. Ongoing series, started April 2020.
