= Frank Thomas (comics) =

American cartoonist

- Born: Franklyn Thomas; 1914
- Died: 1968 (age c. 54)
- Areas: Writer, Artist
- Notable works: The Eye, The Owl

Frank Thomas (1914–1968) was an American Golden Age cartoonist who worked primarily for Centaur Publications.

For Centaur he created The Eye, Chuck Hardy, Dr. Hypno, and Solarman (no relation to the Marvel Comics superhero of the same name). Later in his career, he worked for Dell on The Owl, Billy and Bonnie Bee, Buddies and other characters. He wrote scripts for Andy Panda, Little Lulu, Woody Woodpecker and Little Scouts.

== Comic strips ==
Also in the 1940s, he did the Dinky Doyle daily strip. In the following decade, he did the Going West strip (1951–54), as well as Hossface Hank (Al Smith Service, 1955–1964). Between 1955 and 1965 he was ghost artist on Henning Dahl Mikkelsen's Ferd'nand comic strip. His Aunty and Arabella comic panels for Cats magazine continued in print for over two decades after his death.

== Legacy ==
Despite his relatively brief career and obscure status as a creator, Thomas's characters saw numerous revivals in the years and decades that followed his retirement from the field. In the 1960s, Gold Key Comics revived The Owl and Owl Girl, inspired by the success of the Batman television series. The two issues of Gold Key's The Owl—in which the duo was shown in campy, self-parodying stories—came out in April 1967 and April 1968. In the 1970s, The Owl appeared in issue #22 of Gold Key's The Occult Files of Doctor Spektor.

In 1999, The Owl appeared in issue #17 of the AC Comics title Men of Mystery Comics. The Owl is one of many public domain characters to appear in Dynamite Entertainment’s 2008 miniseries Project Superpowers.

His Eye character also saw a brief revival in the early 1990s as a supporting character in Malibu Comics' Protectors series.
