= Fantom of the Fair =

Publication information
- Publisher: Centaur Publications
- First appearance: Amazing Mystery Funnies vol. 2, #7 (July 1939), revived in 1986 as Phantom of the Fair (Secret Origins #7, October 1986) by DC Comics, revived again in 1992 as Gravestone in the Protectors of Malibu Comics

In-story information
- Abilities: Stealth, teleportation, and emotional manipulation (feelings of fear to people close to him)

The Fantom of the Fair is one of the earliest published Golden Age superheroes. He debuted in Centaur Publications' Amazing Mystery Funnies vol. 2, #7 (cover-dated July 1939), the overall 11th issue of that title. He premiered, according to cover dates, the same month as DC Comics' Sandman, Fox Publications' The Flame, and Centaur's Masked Marvel. He was created by Paul Gustavson, who had previously created the Arrow for Centaur.

His early adventures are set fighting threats at the 1939 New York World's Fair. He lives in a subterranean chamber under the Fair, and he travels via secret trap doors placed around the fairgrounds. He spots criminals by using his "crimetracking televisor". During the time between the 1939 and 1940 Fair seasons, he travels in a series of stories set outside the Fair. He was often shown during these outside stories in a simple suit, with a hat brim hiding his features.

He was originally clad in an all-black hood and bodysuit, with a purple cape, but soon adopted an open-faced cowl and red cape around the close of the 1939 Fair season. The Fantom was seldom displayed with overt powers, but demonstrated the ability to tamper with people's memories and displayed incredible strength in his initial appearance. His first adventure showed an ancient book that indicated that the Fantom had lived in Iceland 1000 years ago.

The Fantom of the Fair appeared through Amazing Mystery Comics vol. 3, #8 (Sept. 1940). In this final issue, he was called Fantoman, because by this time the World's Fair had ended.

His adventures were reprinted in Amazing Adventure Funnies #1 (June 1940) and in Fantoman #2–4 (Aug.-Dec. 1940). Other artists on the series included Frank Thomas, Harry Sahle, and writer George Kapitan.

== Other versions ==
A villainous character based on the Fantom of the Fair, the "Phantom of the Fair", appeared in a revised version of the Golden Age Sandman's origin in DC Comics Secret Origins Vol. 2 #7 (October 1986), and received a character profile in Who's Who: Update '87 Vol 1 #4 (November 1987). A more murderous incarnation of this version later appeared in Sandman Mystery Theatre #41–44, where he was a homosexual man sexually repressed by his father who, after his death, "commanded" him to torture, mutilate, and kill other homosexual men.

Malibu Comics revived the character under the name Gravestone. Little is known about the mysterious Gravestone other than that he appears to be hundreds, possibly thousands, of years old. He comes and goes at will, favoring the cloaking shelter of night and shadows.
