= List of Centaur Publications publications =

This is a list of Centaur Publications publications.

== Titles ==
Title	Series	Issues	Dates	Notes
Amazing Adventure Funnies		#1-2	June – September 1940	
Amazing Man Comics		#5-26	June 1939 – January 1942	
Amazing Mystery Funnies		#1-24	August 1938 – September 1940	
The Arrow		#1-3	October 1940 – October 1941	
C-M-O Comics		#1-2	1942	
Comic Pages		(3 issues)		
The Comics Magazine		#1-5	May – September 1936	Continues to Funny Pages.
Cowboy Comics		#13-14	July – August 1938	Continues from Star Ranger. Continues to Star Ranger Funnies.
Detective Eye		#1-2	November – December 1940	
Detective Picture Stories		#1-5	December 1936 – April 1937	
Fantoman		#2-4	August – December 1940	
Funny Pages	1	#6-11	November 1936 – June 1937	Continues from The Comics Magazine.
Funny Pages	2	#1-12	September 1937 – December 1938	
Funny Pages	3	#1-10	February – December 1939	
Funny Pages	4	#1	January 1940	
Funny Pages		#35-42	March – October 1940	
Funny Picture Stories	1	#1-7	November 1936 – June 1937	
Funny Picture Stories	2	#1-11	September 1937 – November 1938	
Funny Picture Stories	3	#1-3	January – May 1939	
Keen Detective Funnies	1	#8-11	July – December 1938	
Keen Detective Funnies	2	#1-12	January – December 1939	
Keen Detective Funnies	3	#1	January 1940	
Keen Detective Funnies		#18-24	March – September 1940	
Liberty Scouts Comics		#2-3	June – August 1941	
Man of War Comics		#1-2	November 1941 – January 1942	
Masked Marvel		#1-3	September – December 1940	
Star Comics	1	#1-16	February 1937 – December 1938	
Star Comics	2	#1-7	February – August 1939	
Star Ranger		#1-12	February 1937 – May 1938	One of the first ongoing Western comics; becomes Cowboy Comics
Star Ranger Funnies		#15, 1-5	October 1938 – August 1939	Continued from Cowboy Comics. Encountered a volume switch after issue #15
Stars and Stripes Comics		#2-6	May – December 1941	
Super Spy		#1-2	October – November 1940	
Uncle Joe's Funnies		#1	1938	
Western Picture Stories		#1-4	February – June 1937	One of the first ongoing Western comics
Wham Comics		#1-2	November – December 1940	
World Famous Heroes Magazine		#1-4	October 1941 – April 1942	
