= June Tarpé Mills =

American comics creator (1912–1988)

- Born: June Mills; February 25, 1912 Brooklyn, New York City, U.S.
- Died: December 12, 1988 (aged 76) Brooklyn, New York City, U.S.
- Areas: Artist, writer
- Pseudonym: Tarpé Mills
- Notable works: Miss Fury
- Awards: Will Eisner Award Hall of Fame (2019)

Tarpé Mills (25 February 1912 – 12 December 1988) was the pseudonym of the American comic book creator June Mills, (Note: Tarpé was her mother's maiden name.) one of the first major female comics artists. She is best known for her action comic strip Miss Fury, featuring the first female action hero created by a woman.

== Biography ==
June Tarpé Mills created several action comics characters ("Devil's Dust", "The Cat Man", "The Purple Zombie" and "Daredevil Barry Finn") before creating her most remembered character, "Miss Fury," in 1941. Mills also wrote original scripts, penciled, and inked stories for these comic book series prior to Miss Fury: Funny Pages, Star Comics, Amazing Mystery Funnies, Amazing Man Comics, Masked Marvel, Prize Comics, Target Comics, and Reg'lar Fellers Heroic Comics.

Miss Fury ran until 1952, when Tarpé Mills mostly retired from the comics industry. She briefly returned in 1971 with Our Love Story for Marvel Comics and in 1979 began work on a Miss Fury graphic novel which would remain unfinished.

She died on 12 December 1988 in Brooklyn, New York, and is buried in Forest Green Park Cemetery in Morganville, New Jersey.

June Tarpe Mills was inducted into the Will Eisner Award Hall of Fame on July 19, 2019.

== Miss Fury ==
The Bell Syndicate first published the Miss Fury comic strip (then titled The Black Fury) on April 6, 1941, predating the first appearance of Wonder Woman by eight months. The strip "ran in full color in the Sunday comics pages for 351 consecutive weeks from 1942 through 1949, and was also collected in comic book form by Timely Comics." Circulation included over 100 newspapers at its most popular stage. As the Miss Fury strip became more popular, it eventually became public knowledge its creator was a woman.

Miss Fury, the alter ego of socialite Marla Drake, was a character based loosely on Mills' own appearance.

During World War II, "Miss Fury" was painted on the nose of three American warplanes in Europe and the South Pacific. Two of the recurring villains were the Nazi agents Erica Von Kampf and General Bruno. Mills' own white Persian cat Perri-Purr was introduced in the strip, and during World War II Perri-Purr became an unofficial mascot of the American troops.

=== Fashion ===
The artwork was created in a glamorous style with considerable attention placed on the heroine's outfits. These outfits varied from lacy evening gowns and lingerie to bathing suits and athletic costumes. Mills' attention to fashion in Miss Fury was mirrored in the work of her contemporary Dalia Messick's "Brenda Starr," and in this sense the women were ahead of their male counterparts who typically "dressed [their] heroines in plain red dresses."

Cut-out paper fashion dolls were included for the first time in the comic-book reprints of Miss Fury, leading Trina Robbins to guess that these books were intended for a female audience. Mills sent paper dolls to young women who had written fan mail requesting art.

=== Censorship ===
Miss Fury was notoriously full of "kinkiness," including "whips, spike heels, female-on-female violence, and lingerie scenes." One character's costume in a 1947 publication "was so daring that 37 newspapers cancelled the strip" that day. A bathing scene from the tenth Miss Fury Sunday page on June 8, 1941, ran in newspapers at the time but was later excluded from the 1942 Timely Comics reprint.

Trina Robbins said on Miss Fury:

"The only outrage I have seen were those newspapers that censored Mills's strip in which she dressed her nightclub entertainer character, Era, in an outfit that would not bother us in the least today. But it obviously shocked the pants – yes, verbal joke intended – off some people."

== Style ==
Mills' art in Miss Fury was modeled on the work of Milton Caniff. Her portrayal of action across multiple panels, as well as the natural poses and facial expressions of her characters, has been described as "cinematic," echoing the film-noire style. Mills' characters also possessed a "pinup quality."

Dean Mullaney, editor and publisher behind Eclipse Enterprises, wrote that "[Mills'] art is drawn very traditionally—no surprises, no ah-ha moments."

Evie Nagy for The Los Angeles Review of Books remarked that "the flow of Mills's sequential art feels completely organic."

== Legacy ==
June Mills' legacy as the first woman to create a female action hero in comics was contextualized by Victoria Ingalls for the American Psychological Association. Out of a list of hundreds of female "superheroes" surveyed in her abstract, Ingalls identified only eleven as being created by a woman not working in a team with a male writer. Mills' Marla Drake is the chronological first of these eleven heroes.

According to Mike Madrid in his book The Supergirls, Marla Drake belongs to the "Debutante" caste of early comics female heroines, who include Sandra Knight (Phantom Lady), Dianne Grayton (Spider Widow), Diana Adams (Miss Masque), and Brenda Banks (Lady Luck). These characters form a 'sorority' of heiresses and socialites who had been forced into lives of propriety, submission, and "tedious leisure." "Putting on a cape and mask liberated these women" to embrace their own identities, fight crime, and trade their "entitled boredom" for thrills.

Madrid wrote, "Mills' approach to a secret identity seemed more realistic, injected with a feminine practicality."

=== Awards and honors ===
Miss Fury: Sensational Sundays 1941-1944 was a 2012 Eisner award nominee.

Mills was inducted as one of the four Judges' Choices into the 2019 Eisner Award Hall of Fame on July 19, 2019, at Comic-Con International in San Diego.

== Bibliography ==
- Funny Pages (1936)
  - "Diana Deane in "White Goddess"" vol. 3, #8
  - "The Third Episode of Diana Deane in "White Goddess"" vol. 3, #9
  - "White Goddess [conclusion]" vol. 4, #1
- Star Comics (1939)
  - "Diana Deane in Hollywood" vol. 2, #5 and #7
  - Phantom Rider #18
  - It takes heavy artillery to win a water pistol fight! #23
- Amazing Mystery Funnies (1939)
  - Daredevil Barry Finn vol. 2, #4-5, #9, #11-12, and vol. 3 #1
- Amazing Man Comics (1939)
  - "The Coming of Cat-Man" #5
  - "The Ivy Menace" #6
  - "The Return of the Cat Man" #8
- Masked Marvel (1940)
  - "The Vampire" #2
- Prize Comics (1940)
  - "Birth of a Barnstormer" vol. 1, #1
  - "The Rescue of Lt. Andre" vol. 1, #1
  - "The Diamond Smuggler" vol. 1, #2
  - "The Lost City of Tsol" vol. 1, #2
  - "Murder of a Mail Pilot" vol. 1, #3
  - "Marco Hawk's Big Score" vol. 1, #3
  - "Mamba Island" vol. 1, #4
  - "The Witch Doctor's Waterloo" vol. 1, #5
  - "The Search For Kalobi" vol. 1, #6
- Target Comics (1940)
  - "The Maskless Axeman" vol. 1, #1
  - "Ninety Seconds For No. 91" vol. 1, #2
  - "Devil's Dust" vol. 1, #2
  - "Dance of Death" vol. 1, #3
  - "The Music Monster" vol. 1, #4
  - "Ezekiel's Ark" vol. 1, #5
  - "The Blue Zombie" vol. 1, #6
  - "Boomerang" vol. 1, #9 and #11
  - "Sword of Destiny" vol. 1, #10
  - "Satan's Colors" vol. 1, #12
  - "The Three Mutineers" vol. 2 #1
- Reg'lar Fellers Heroic Comics (1940-1942)
  - Issues 1-12 (Purple Zombie series)
- Miss Fury (1941-1952)
- Our Love Story (1969)
  - "Model With a Broken Heart" #14
- Unpublished and unfinished Miss Fury graphic novel (1979)

=== Posthumous ===
- Miss Fury: Sensational Sundays 1944-1949
- Miss Fury: Sensational Sundays 1941-1944 (2013)
- CBLDF Presents: She Changed Comics (2016)
- Men of Mystery Comics #104 (2017)
- Prize Comics (2017)
