= Protectors (comics) =

Comic book series

- The Protectors

Publication information
- Publisher: Malibu Comics (Marvel Comics)
- First appearance: Protectors #1 (September 1992)
- Created by: R. A. Jones

In-story information
- Base(s): Washington D.C
- Member(s): Airman; Amazing Man; Arrow; Aura; The Clock; The Eye; Gravestone; Man of War; Mighty Man; Nightmask; Thresher; Witch

The Protectors is a 20-issue comic book series published by Malibu Comics from 1992 until 1994. Originally meant to be a six-issue series, response was positive enough that Malibu decided to make the series ongoing. The series was cancelled (along with the rest of the "Genesis" titles) so that, according to Malibu, they could focus more on the "Ultraverse" line.

Many of the characters included in the series were taken from heroes created by Centaur Publications, and had fallen into the public domain and revamped by writer R. A. Jones. Some heroes were given new names, such as Gravestone (formerly Fantom of the Fair, Fantom or Fantoman), Nightmask (Masked Marvel), Thresher (a.k.a. Shark), and Midnight Blue (formerly Blue Lady). In the case of Gravestone, the name was changed to avoid confusion with Lee Falk's Phantom (although there were a few instances when the hero was referred to as "Fantom" within the pages of the first few issues). Nightmask was changed from Masked Marvel to avoid any potential legal problems with Marvel Comics (both explanations appeared in the letter column page of the first issue of The Protectors apparently forgetting the fact that "Nightmask" was also the name of a dream-surfing superhero in their New Universe imprint from the late 1980s). Many of Centaur's heroes received updated costumes, but retained their original names, including Zardi The Eternal Man, Amazing Man, Mighty Man, Man of War, Iron Skull, Mantoka, Arrow, Witch and Airman, along with the villains The Great Question and Conqueror. Malibu also made use of the Rocket Ranger (a character created by the video game company Cinemaware) within the pages of Man of War series and Miss Fury, who they had licensed for a previous series. With the 13th issue of the series, Malibu started the "Genesis" cross-over, which incorporated the books Dinosaurs for Hire and Ex-Mutants (volume 2) as part of the six-issue story. At the end of the cross-over, characters from the Protectors would appear in the pages of Ex-Mutants (and vice versa).

The Protectors was cancelled with issue #20, in 1994 (the year Malibu was purchased by Marvel Comics), with readers witnessing the destruction of the Earth, making any type of continuation of the heroes' story highly unlikely. Within the Marvel Comics multiverse, the Genesis Universe is designated as Earth-1136.

== Backstory ==
In the world of The Protectors, heroes (known as Supranormals in this universe) had been around since the late 1930s. The Clock (Brian O'Brien) and Nightmask (Phillip Reinhart) were two of the earliest heroes to fight crime. Others included Amazing Man, Gravestone, Prince Zardi the Eternal Man, Iron Skull, The Eye and Miss Fury (as revealed in The Protectors Handbook and issue #11 of the Protectors' series). With the debut of more powerful heroes to fight crime, The Clock and Nightmask put away their costumes and joined the military.

Starting in 1979, other heroes began to appear, including Man of War, Mighty Man, The Witch, Airman, The Shark (a.k.a. Thresher), The Arrow, Ferret, Aura and Arc. These heroes would gather together in the town of Brinkstone, VA to battle various villains (a group that included The Conqueror, Wisecrack and Jackdaw). The resulting conflict caused the destruction of the town, and The Conqueror, Wisecrack, Jackdaw and most of the citizens of the town were transported to a demon-dimension. While other villains may have been involved in this battle, it is not clear who they were, if they were transported away to another dimension, or what happened to them afterwards. The general public and the government became suspicious of the supranormals after these events, and under increasing pressure, all of the heroes involved eventually retired (as related in the Protectors Handbook).

In 1988, Brian O'Brien had been elected President of the United States of America. He still felt that supranormals would some day be needed, so he appointed Phillip Reinhart as the head of "Project: Golden Age". Reinhart's task was to track down and locate all of the heroes so that if the need arose, they could be contacted and called into action. Once Mr. Monday and his Steel Army began terrorizing innocent people years later, the Protectors were called into action.

The initial team consisted of Man of War, Airman, Arc, Aura, Gravestone, Amazing Man, The Ferret, Prince Zardi, and Mighty Man. Richard Reinhart assumed the mantle of Nightmask, against his father's wishes. With no powers or enhanced abilities, Richard pushed himself hard to prove his worth to the team, but in the end he was killed by Mr Monday (issue #5 of The Protectors). The Witch would also join the group, proving to be a calming influence on Amazing Man, who was secretly being controlled by his old foe, The Great Question. After Nightmask's death, The Eye helped create the third hero to take-on the Nightmask moniker.

The story of Brinkstone was revisited during issues #7–9, as the team, along with Thresher and Arrow, travelled to a demon-dimension ruled by Wisecrack. During this mission, Gravestone and Arc were captured by Wisecrack. He had Gravestone tortured in order to learn how it was that the heroes were in this dimension, but Gravestone died before revealing anything. He would return to life, as explained in the Gravestone series, by battling his way out of the Underworld. As the heroes attacked Wisecrack's fortress, the villain escaped along with the majority of slaves (former citizens of the town) through a portal connecting to a similar dimension, but The Ferret and Arrow were able to rescue one woman after Arrow killed Jackdaw.

Black Fury became the group's next opponent (issues #10–12) when she kidnapped President O'Brien's grandson Michael. Miss Fury arrived to help, but with Amazing Man in-charge of the team in Man of War's absence (busy with events in his own series), the female hero was attacked instead of welcomed. Only the intervention of O'Brien himself restored order. The Protectors were able to rescue Michael, but Black Fury escaped.

Next, the team became involved in "Genesis", Malibu's big cross-over event involving The Protectors, Ex-Mutants and Dinosaurs for Hire titles, with the main villain being Extreme. Afterwards, The Protectors received a new field commander by the name of Chalice, Man of War was put on trial for events that happened during Genesis, and the team battled The Regulators. Finally, the team faced The Great Question, learned that Amazing Man was being manipulated by the villain, and were killed when one of the villain's portals caused the Earth to explode.

== Members ==
- Airman
- Amazing Man
- Arc
- Aura
- The Ferret
- Gravestone
- Man of War
- Mighty Man
- Nightmask
- Witch
- Prince Zardi, The Eternal Man

== Members after the Genesis event ==
- Chalice
- Tanya of the Ex-Mutants
- Piper of the Ex-Mutants

== Supporting and other characters ==
- President Brian O'Brien
- Phillip Reinhart
- Arrow
- The Eye
- Iron Skull
- Mantoka (appearances in the pages of Protectors #10 and #19)
- Mars, The God of War (in the new Man of War's origin: Man of War #6)
- Midnight Blue (recurring character in Ferret ongoing series, #1-4)
- Miss Fury (the granddaughter of the original)
- Nowhere Man (appears in final battle against Great Question)
- Rocket Ranger (appeared in Man of War series)
- Thresher
- Widowmaker
- The second version of the Ex-Mutants
- Dinosaurs For Hire

== Villains ==
- Bandoleer
- Bombardier
- Black Fury
- Blood Lust
- Bogg
- The Conqueror
- Doctor Homage
- Extreme
- Fracas
- The Great Question
- Jackdaw
- Jug
- Killinger
- Mongrel
- Mr. Monday & The Steel Army
- Muck
- Poison
- Posse
- Purple Dragon (son of Mad Ming)
- Shakra
- The Skull
- Toxin
- Wisecrack
- Zeppelin

== Titles related to the Genesis Universe ==
Title	Issues	Initial cover date	Final cover date	Notes
Airman	#1	1993		One-shot
Arrow	#1	1992		One-shot
Dead Clown	#1-3	1993	1994	It appears to happen in Dinosaurs For Hire universe.
Dinosaurs For Hire vol. 1	#1-9	1988	1990	Published by Eternity Comics. It happens in its own universe.
Dinosaurs For Hire vol. 2	#1-12	1993	1994	Published by Malibu Comics. It happens in its own universe before the Genesis crossover.
Ex-Mutants vol. 2	#1-18	1992	1994	Published by Malibu Comics. It happens in its own universe before the Genesis crossover and is also a reboot version of the original Ex-Mutants.
The Ferret vol. 1	#1	1992		One-shot
The Ferret vol. 2	#1-10	1993-1994		Regular series.
Genesis	#0	1993		One shot, ending the Genesis event.
Gravestone	#1-7	1993	1994	Regular series.
Malibu Sun	#24	1993		From April 1993, the magazine contains a 5-pages story, featuring the character Widowmaker.
Man of War	#1-8	1993	1994	Regular series.
Miss Fury vol. 2	#1-4	1991	1992	Limited series. Published by the Adventure Imprint.
Protectors	#1-20	1992	1994	Chief title of the universe.
Protectors Handbook	#1	1992		One-shot Handbook, presenting the Protectors.
Rocket Ranger	#1-5	1991	1992	Limited series about the video game character developed and published by Cinemaware. Published by the Adventure Imprint. The grandson of the original Rocket Ranger appears in Man of War #6-8.
Street Fighter	#1-3	1993	1993	Limited series about the video-game developed and published by Capcom. The superhero Ferret appears in the third issue.
