= Airman (character) =

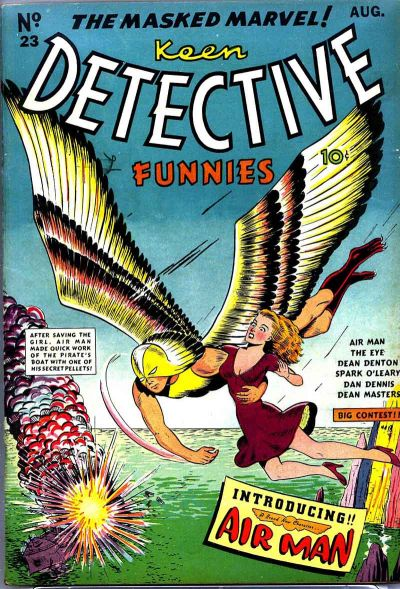
- Keen Detective Funnies #23 (Aug. 1940). Cover art generally credited to Harry Sahle (unconfirmed).

Publication information
- Publisher: Centaur Publications; Malibu Comics
- First appearance: Keen Detective Funnies #23 (August 1940)
- Created by: George Kapitan (script; unconfirmed); Harry Sahle (art)

In-story information
- Alter ego: Drake Stevens
- Team affiliations: The Protectors (Malibu Comics)
- Abilities: Suit gives the ability to fly

Airman (originally Air Man) is a comic book superhero first published by Centaur Publications in 1940, during the period fans and historians call the Golden Age of Comic Books. He first appeared in Keen Detective Funnies #23 (Aug. 1940), in a story by artist Harry Sahle and an unconfirmed writer, generally credited as George Kapitan. Keen Detective Funnies was cancelled after issue #24, but Centaur published two more stories in Detective Eye Comics #1 and 2 (Nov-Dec 1940) before pulling the plug on the character.

After Centaur Publications went out of business, Airman lapsed into the public domain. In the early 1990s, he was revived by Malibu Comics as a character in the series Protectors, and starred in a namesake, one-shot spin-off.

An Airman story from Keen Detective Funnies #24 has been reprinted in Men of Mystery Comics #63 by AC Comics.

== Centaur Comics ==
The original Air Man is Drake Stevens, son of Claude Stevens, a renowned ornithologist. When his father is senselessly murdered, the police are unable to bring the killer to justice. Outraged, Drake puts together a costume consisting of a pair of gas-filled wings and a jet-pack, establishing the crime-fighting identity of Airman. He also utilizes guns and bombs in his quest for justice. In one story, he fights pirates aboard a "Ghost Ship".

== Malibu Comics ==
Malibu Comics' version: Airman #1 (Jan. 1993), cover art by Thomas Derenick.

The new version of Airman debuted in contemporary times. His origin is nearly identical to the original incarnation, except in this version, his father is named Edward and the murderer is revealed to be a supervillain named Captain Klegg. His suit is also different from the original. In addition to a jet pack and the wings on the old suit, the new suit boasts motorized talons in the boots and gloves, as well as a utility belt and a specially designed cowl that gives him telescopic vision.

In the Protectors universe, the heroes have gone into hiding following a disastrous battle at the town of Brinkston. They are drawn together to face Mr. Monday, and the Protectors are formed.

While on the team, Drake is often insecure because of his relative inexperience. He is a friend and an ally of Thresher, the son of Neptune and a mermaid. He rescues the hero in the pages of his own series from the clutches of the Conqueror, a supervillain minion of major Protectors foe the Great Question.

== Dynamite Entertainment ==
In 2008, the character was brought back by Dynamite Entertainment as part of their Project Superpowers storyline. This version of the character matches the original Golden Age version, but is brought from the World War II–era into modern times as part of the storyline.
