= Masked Marvel (comics) =

In comics, Masked Marvel may refer to:

- Masked Marvel (Marvel Comics), an alternate name of Speedball, a Marvel Comics character
- Masked Marvel (Centaur Publications), a Centaur Publications character
