= Mighty Man =

Mighty Man refers to any one of several fictional, super-powered individuals in literature:

- Mighty Man (Image Comics), a superhero in the Savage Dragon comic book series
- Mighty Man (television), a diminutive, crime-fighter character on Mighty Man and Yukk (1980 to 1981)
- Mighty Man (Centaur Comics), a Centaur Publications comics character
- Mighty Man (comics), a reimagined version of the Centaur Comics character, published by Malibu Comics
- Mighty Man (CrossGen), a CrossGen comics character
