= Dinosaurs for Hire =

American comic book series, 1988–1994

- The cover for Dinosaurs For Hire, art by Scott Bieser, Bryon Carson, and Scott Hanna.

Publication information
- Publisher: Marvel Comics
- Schedule: Bimonthly
- Genre: Science fiction comedy
- Publication date: March 1988–Jan. 1990; Feb. 1993–Feb. 1994
- No. of issues: 9 (1988–1990); 12 (1993–1994)
- Main character: Dinosaurs for Hire

Creative team
- Created by: Tom Mason
- Written by: Tom Mason

Dinosaurs for Hire is an American comic book series created by Tom Mason in 1988. It was first published by Eternity Comics and ran nine issues until 1990 when it was cancelled. The title returned to publication in 1993 by Malibu Comics, which had purchased Eternity as an imprint.

Dinosaurs For Hire, along with Ex-Mutants, was merged with the Protectors universe during Malibu's "Genesis" crossover before being cancelled a second time. Malibu was purchased by Marvel Comics in 1993, and though no subsequent Dinosaurs for Hire comics were published, its reality is designated as Earth-88469 within the Marvel Comics multiverse.

Dinosaurs for Hire originated as a black-and-white comic by Mason titled Elvis Undercover, featuring Elvis Presley as a crime-fighter. The comic was never produced, out of concerns that Presley's estate would sue. Mason eventually divided Presley's fictional personality among three dinosaur characters, resulting in Dinosaurs for Hire. To represent the dinosaur characters, Mason chose Tyrannosaurus, Triceratops, and Stegosaurus, based on their popularity among the general public.

== Synopsis ==
Dinosaurs for Hire is a satirical comic that is heavy on parody and humor. The primary characters are a tyrannosaurus named Archie who dresses like the Terminator, a triceratops named Lorenzo who wears a Hawaiian shirt, a one-eyed stegosaurus named Reese who wields heavy weapons, and a pterodactyl named Cyrano. In the comics, the Dinosaurs are actually intelligent aliens who resemble smaller versions of Earth dinosaurs presumably due to a convergent evolution (aside from their extraterrestrial nature, their backstory was only hinted at but never confirmed). After their spacecraft malfunctions in Earth's atmosphere and crashes into the ocean, they are stranded on Earth and become mercenaries for hire.

== In other media ==
=== Video game ===
A Dinosaurs for Hire video game by Sega was released in 1993, for the Sega Genesis. It is a shoot 'em up game featuring Archie, Lorenzo and Reese as playable characters, while Cyrano occasionally shows up to give mission briefings.

=== Cancelled animated series ===
An animated television series had been planned for the Fox Network in the early 1990s, with Mason as a consultant. The project was stagnant for two years, until Fox took notice of the upcoming dinosaur film Jurassic Park (1993). According to Mason, there was suddenly "a tremendous rush to get a dinosaur show on the air". Comic book writer Len Wein was hired to work on the series bible and pilot episode script.

Mason was not fond of Fox's planned direction for the series. He said the network wanted a series similar to Teenage Mutant Ninja Turtles with "lots of slapstick hijinks". According to Mason, Fox sought to "dumb down" the Dinosaurs for Hire concept and make it "kid-friendly for TV". The network also wanted the series to reveal the dinosaurs' origins, an idea that Mason disliked, believing it would take away "a certain amount of mystery and charm". He had devised his own origin story years earlier but did not wish to reveal it, stating only that it was much different to what Fox had planned. He said Fox's origin story would not be acknowledged in his comics. The show never made it out of development.
