= Eye (Centaur Publications) =

The Eye
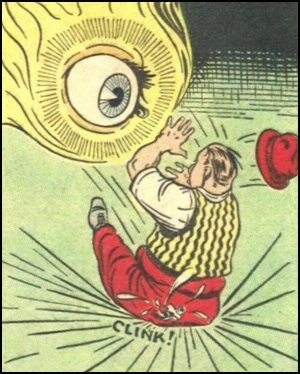

Publication information
- Publisher: Centaur Publications
- First appearance: Keen Detective Funnies vol. 2, #12 (December 1939)
- Created by: Frank Thomas

In-story information
- Team affiliations: The Protectors
- Abilities: Omnipotence; Immortality; Teleportation; Invisibility; Transvection; Telekenisis; Pyrokinesis; Heat/X-ray vision Ability to work miracles

The Eye is a fictional comic book character created by Frank Thomas and published by Centaur Publications. The character had no origin story, and existed only as a giant, floating, disembodied eye, wreathed in a halo of golden light. This powerful being was obsessed with the concept of justice, and existed to encourage average people to do what they could to attain it for themselves. If the obstacles proved too great, the Eye would assist its mortal charges by working miracles. Time and space meant nothing to the Eye and it existed as a physical embodiment of man's inner conscience.

The Eye appeared in the pages of Centaur's Keen Detective Funnies for 16 issues (cover-dated December 1939 – September 1940), in a feature entitled "The Eye Sees". The feature began with the book's 16th issue, and continued until the title folded after its 24th issue (September 1940). Following its run in Keen Detective, Centaur promoted the Eye to its own book, Detective Eye, which ran for two issues (Nov.-Dec. 1940) before folding as well.

A copycat feature called "The Hand" appeared in Harvey Comics' Speed Comics issues #12-13 (March–May 1941), with a huge disembodied hand tapping people on the shoulder and admonishing them for their wrongdoing.

== Characteristics ==
The Eye had the ability to fly, appear and disappear, melt solid steel and bring invisible forces to bear, but had to work with human agents to fight crime. The Eye was a magical being "to whom time and distance are nothing — who bares man's thoughts and pierces his conscience!"

Don Markstein writes:

The Eye missed being properly referred to as simply a flying eyeball by never quite being seen floating freely, or shown from behind. It seemed to have skin, even lashes, attached, and was sometimes surrounded by what looked like yellow fire. It could have been interpreted as a giant humanoid, peeping through a flaming hole in the air. No explanation was ever given as to where it came from or what made it what it was. It was just there, turning up from time to time to help a good guy and/or hinder a bad one, neither of which would be seen in subsequent stories. It talked (again, without a mouth) like an omnipotent, omnibenevolent being, with a strong flair for melodrama. Was it supposed to be the Eye of God? Not stated, tho most stories began with lengthy captions alleging that time and distance meant nothing to it.

The Eye was assisted by human Jack Barrister, who helps the Eye pursue criminals and bring them to justice.

== Appearances ==
=== Golden Age ===
- Keen Detective Funnies vol. 2, #12
- Keen Detective Funnies vol. 3, #1
- Keen Detective Funnies #18–24
- Detective Eye #1, #2

=== Reprints ===
In 1987, Michael T. Gilbert included one of the original Centaur Publications Eye stories in the first issue his two-part anthology comic, Mr. Monster's Hi-Shock Schlock.

=== Revivals ===
In 1992, Malibu Comics revived several Centaur heroes—which by that time had lapsed into public domain—as the superhero team the Protectors. A reworked version of the Eye appeared as a supporting character throughout the series' 20-issue run through 1994.

== Fictional history ==
The Eye is first shown in Keen Detective Funnies vol. 2 issue #12 (or Keen Detective Funnies #16), appearing before Afghanistan refugees E.D. Mattes and his daughter, Ann, who were forced out of their country by Mattes' business rival, Islam Herat. The Eye informs them that he will have use for them before disappearing. The two mention that The Eye is a well known figure in Afghan culture, although there is no real world proof to back that up outside of the Nazar. Herat orders two of his subordinates to assassinate Mattes in New York City and to bring his daughter back to him so that he can marry her. The Eye destroys their plane before they reach America, then returns to Mattes and orders him to write a letter back to Herat stating that the job was completed. He then tells them to journey to Kabul, where Mattes poses as his own ghost to get Herat to confess. He's then arrested by the police and Mattes is given his old position again.

The Eye next appears after an old man is murdered by a hitman called "Monk" and the blame is placed on a driver who first arrived on the scene. Monk was hired by the old man's niece, Lucille Hodson, as part of a plan to make herself sole heiress of his fortune. The Eye frees the driver from his prison cell by melting the bars and tells him to inform Hodson that he works for Monk, who is confessing to the police. She impulsively goes to the police station to provide proof that Monk was behind the murder, accidentally indicting herself. Monk tries to escape, but The Eye telepathically lifts his car and places it on top of a telephone pole, allowing the police to apprehend him.

In the fictional Republic of Othsania, a group of arms dealers led by the one-eyed Ganza are digging a tunnel to the American consulate, intending to bomb it and blame the opposing side, prolonging the war. The Eye wakes the daughter of the U.S. ambassador, who had heard the men's voices the day before, and tells her not to warn anyone about them yet. Ganza's men finish laying the explosives and he poisons them to cover his tracks. The Eye moves the explosives from underneath the consulate to underneath Ganza's hiding place so that when he activates them, he dies in the explosion. The negotiations between America and Othsania are completed, and the ambassador is sent home.

Manuel Rossoff has been ordered to appear before "The Committee Investigating Un-American Activities", but he plans to bomb the room holding evidence against him. A paperboy walks in on them discussing their plans, so they tie him to a chair. The Eye appears to him and disintegrates the ropes. Manuel presents his defense, but as he's leaving The Eye paralyzes them and orders the paperboy to tie them up. The kid then goes and finds a police officer who arrests them.

A group of immigrants illegally enter the country by way of plane smuggling, but one of them is caught by a racist old man and his daughter. The latter goes to get the sheriff, who holds him in a cell until he decides what to do with him. Since the immigrant will probably go free, The Eye decides to alert the old man to where the next parachuting immigrants will be. It then catches the parachuters and holds them midair until the old man and his daughter arrive. The Eye then hijacks and crashes the plane, murdering the two smugglers. This is the first issue in which The Eye does not save or protect anyone's life.

A boxer named "Tiny" is training to fight "Kid Wilson" but is not as tough as he used to be. Kid's coach, however, decides to cheat by using a gaseous sedative that will knock out his opponents. The Eye tells Tiny to stuff his nose with cotton and to target Kid's nose in order to dislodge his cotton. Tiny does and beats Kid, becoming "the new world's heavyweight champion". After the match, The Eye appears before the coach, scaring him and causing him to fall, breaking the vial and knocking out everyone in the locker room. The boxing commission discovers what they did and fire them.

Two ex-mob convicts, "Bull" and "Tip the Drip", are about to be broken out of prison by their accomplices, Danny and "Clipper". Danny also plans to bring Bull's wife, Maizie, along with them so Bull can murder her for testifying against him. The Eye goes to Maizie and tells her to go along with it until he gives her further instructions. When the mobsters show up, she resists going with them at first but they force her out with threats. Meanwhile, Bull starts a riot and overpowers the guards, forcing himself into the tower. After scaling the wall, Bull knocks out Tip and uses him as a human shield against the guard's bullets. He is about to get away, but The Eye shines a bright light on him, giving away his location and allowing the guards to shoot him down. The Eye then makes Danny and Clipper fall asleep, allowing Maizie to inform the guards about their plan.

Attorney at law Jack Barrister is investigating a local gangster called Rigonie that has been performing robberies. Despite being a lawyer, he seems to perform the same activities as a police detective. The Eye appears to him and encourages him to pursue his lead. It is implied that Jack and The Eye have worked together before. Rigonie assassinates Jack's lead and then attempts to have Jack assassinated, and he returns home to find that his wife, Fay, has received telephone threats. That evening, she's kidnapped by Rigonie's men. The Eye informs Jack, but reassures him that everything will work out. Jack heads over to the house of his partner, Chick, and the two plan to show up at one of their robberies with some friends in the police force to rescue Fay. In the ensuing battle, Rigonie accidentally shoots his top lieutenant, Silky, while aiming for Jack. Jack then shoots Rigonie and embraces his wife. The Eye appears to congratulate Jack, who says that he couldn't have done it with The Eye's help. Later, when Jack and Fay are on vacation, The Eye appears before them again, demanding their help. He alerts him to the existence of Otto Ledmann, a local pirate. Jack goes down to the docks to investigate, but Fay insists on going with him. The two sneak onto Ledmann's home while he's away and discover several treasures, including a safe full of gems with each one representing a life taken by Ledmann. Fay finds a ledger of Ledmann's records right as Ledmann returns from a pirating mission. The two escape in a shoot out. With the help of Mr. Hawkins, the next target according to Ledmann's ledger, and the two ambush Ledmann's crew. Ledmann attempts to escape in a diving suit, but Jack chases after him. Ledmann tricks on a rock and smashes his helmet on coral, drowning him.
