= Martin Filchock =

American cartoonist

Martin Filchock (January 6, 1912 – September 5, 2012) was an American cartoonist and self-taught artist who was a pioneer during the Golden Age of Comics. During World War II, he served in the U.S. Army and drew comics for Army magazines. He also pitched semi-professional baseball.

Filchock illustrated more than a hundred magazines including The Saturday Evening Post, Good Housekeeping, Reader's Digest, and The Journal of the American Medical Association.

At the time of his death at age 100, he was described as the "oldest working cartoonist." He had had his first cartoon published in 1925 when he was only 13 years old.

== See also ==
- Mighty Man, a character he created
