= Miss Fury =

1940s comic book superheroine

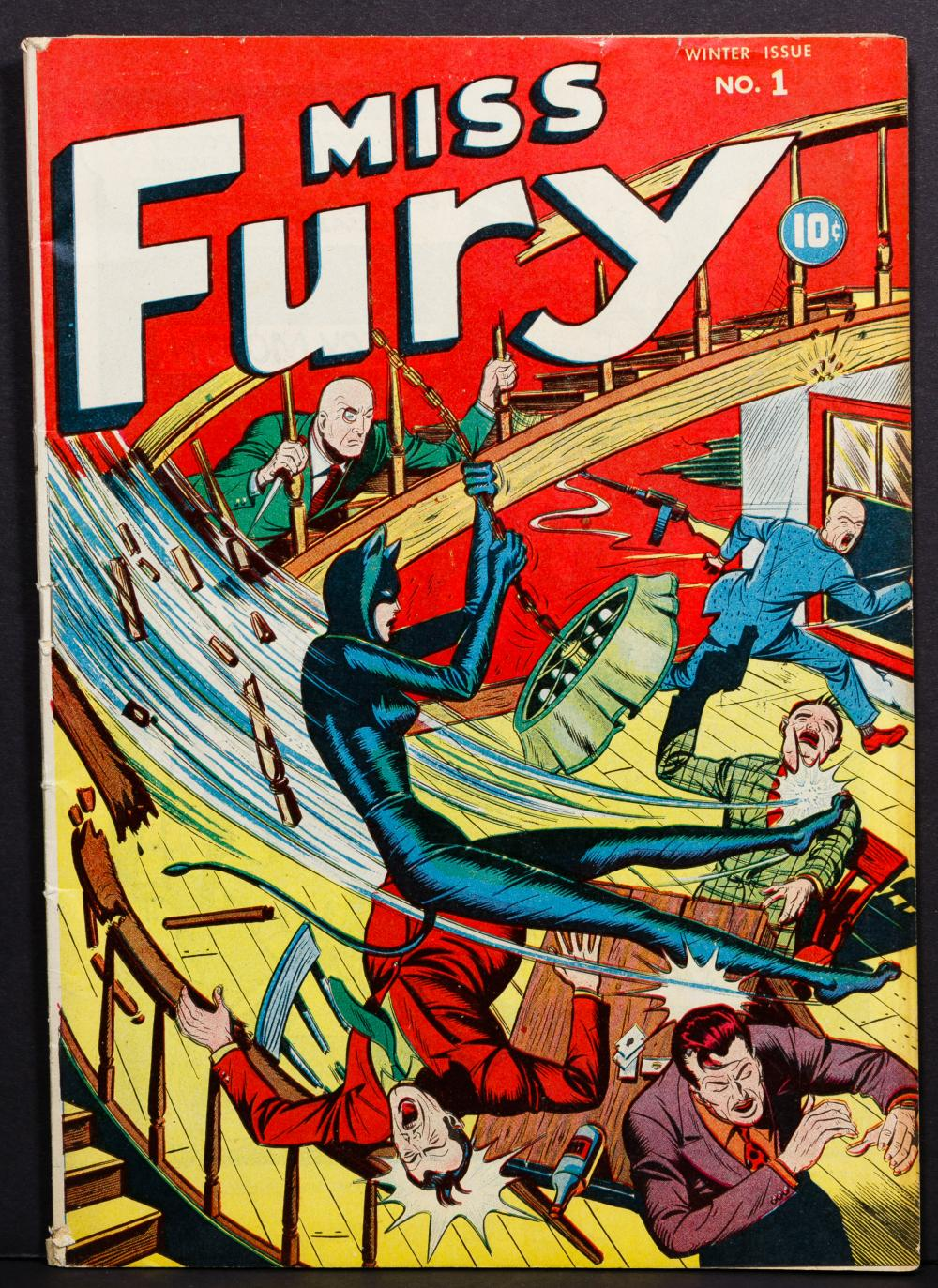
Miss Fury, on the cover of issue #1; art by Alex Schomburg

Miss Fury is a comic book superheroine from the Golden Age of Comics. She first appeared as The Black Fury on April 6, 1941, a Sunday comic strip distributed by the Bell Syndicate, and created by artist June Tarpé Mills (writing as Tarpé Mills). The strip was retitled Miss Fury in November 1941 and ran until December 30, 1951

== Overview ==
The character's real identity is wealthy socialite Marla Drake. She has no innate superpowers, but gains increased strength and speed when she dons a special skintight catsuit when fighting crime. The panther skin was bequeathed to her by her uncle, who said that it was used by an African witch doctor in voodoo ceremonies.

Miss Fury combats several recurring villains, including mad scientist Diman Saraf and Nazi agents Baroness Erica von Kampf and General Bruno. Drake was also involved in a love triangle with her former fiancé, Gary Hale, and Detective Dan Carey. A complicated figure, Marla doesn't seem to like being a superhero, resenting the need for a secret identity and the danger it poses. She is sometimes accompanied by an albino Brazilian named Albino Joe.

Although Miss Fury was popular, the revealing outfits worn by the female characters provoked some controversy at the time. When Marla Drake was drawn wearing a bikini in 1947, 37 newspapers dropped the strip in response. The Miss Fury strip ran until 1952.

Marvel Comics (then known as Timely Comics) reprinted for Sunday strips in comic book form from 1942 to 1946 in eight issues published from Winter 1942 to Winter 1945.

Avon Publications reprinted a story in The Saint #6 (April 1949).

In 1979 Archival Press reissued her early adventures in graphic novel format, with a new cover by Mills.

In 2011, IDW's "The Library of American Comics" put out a collection of strips covering 1944–49 and they also published another volume containing the 1941–1944 Miss Fury strips in 2013.

== Other appearances ==
Tarpé Mills's Miss Fury was revived in a four-issue mini-series published in 1991 by Adventure Comics (an imprint of Malibu Comics). In that series, Marlene Hale dons a cat outfit from her family's attic as a Halloween costume only to end up rescuing a thirteen-year-old being assaulted by a drug dealer, after which her grandfather Dan Carey reveals that she is the granddaughter of the original Miss Fury. A caped and bare-legged gun-wielding version of Miss Fury appears calling herself "Black Fury", extorting drug dealers and committing murders. At the same time, Marlene's aunt Stephanie (daughter of Erika von Kampf and Dan Carey) also adopts a jacket-wearing version of the Miss Fury persona. Marlene and her grandfather independently suspect that Stephanie is the Black Fury, while Stephanie suspects the same of Marlene, and a battle between the two ends when both fall into a vat of chemicals. On another night, Marlene defeats Stephanie, who concedes the mantle of the Miss Fury to Marlene, and they realize that the Black Fury must be a third person. As the true Miss Fury, Marlene tracks down and defeats the Black Fury, who is revealed to be the drug dealer Marlene originally fought.

This version of Miss Fury, now with increased strength and aggression from falling into the vat of chemicals, would return in issues 10–12 of Malibu Comics' Protectors series. Black Fury, who Marlene again suspects of being a similarly chemically enhanced version of her aunt Stephanie, has kidnapped the grandson of President Brian O'Brien (the former Clock). Miss Fury helps the Protectors rescue the grandson, but Black Fury slips away. Miss Fury would continue to appear in the pages of The Protectors until the series ended with issue #20 in 1994.

The original Miss Fury also saw a brief cameo reappearance in 2008 when Marvel Comics published the first issue of the series The Twelve. She was depicted as part of an army of 1940s costumed heroes storming Berlin, Nazi Germany during the final days of World War II.

In November 2012, the Golden Age Miss Fury appeared in the eight issue Dynamite Entertainment mini-series Masks, where she joined with other comic and pulp-magazine heroes (including Zorro, the Shadow and the Green Hornet) to combat the villainous "Party of Justice". In April 2013, Dynamite began publishing a comic book series with an updated version of the Golden Age Miss Fury, which ran for eleven issues through 2014, collected as Miss Fury: Anger is an Energy and Miss Fury: Walk Through the Valley. During the same period, she appeared alongside the Sparrow (of The Shadow) in the five issue mini-series Noir, collected in Noir: The Mohawk Templar. In 2015, she reappeared in Swords of Sorrow: Miss Fury and Lady Rawhide, the six issue Swords of Sorrow mini-series, as well as the six issue sequel, Masks 2. A second volume of the Miss Fury series, collected as Miss Fury: The Minor Key, ran for six issues in 2016. A three-issue third volume titled Miss Fury: Joy Division was announced in 2018 for an October release, but was delayed again in favor of a September 15, 2019 release, before finally being announced for an early 2021 release as a trade-paperback following a successful Indiegogo campaign. The new volume was written and drawn by Billy Tucci and Maria Laura Sanapo.

She also appears in Die!namite (2020–2021) as an elderly woman in a modern-day retirement home, who is prompted by a zombie outbreak to again don her costume.

She and Green Hornet will be teaming up with writers Alex Segura, Henry Barajas and Artist Federico Sorressa.

=== Film ===
Miss Fury appeared in the 2026 short film MS. FURY directed by Chris .R. Notarile, and starring Corey Hegel. This version is the mentor of Sandra Knight/Phantom Lady, who takes up crimefighting after learning she has terminal cancer.
