= George Kapitan =

American comic book writer (1919–1996)

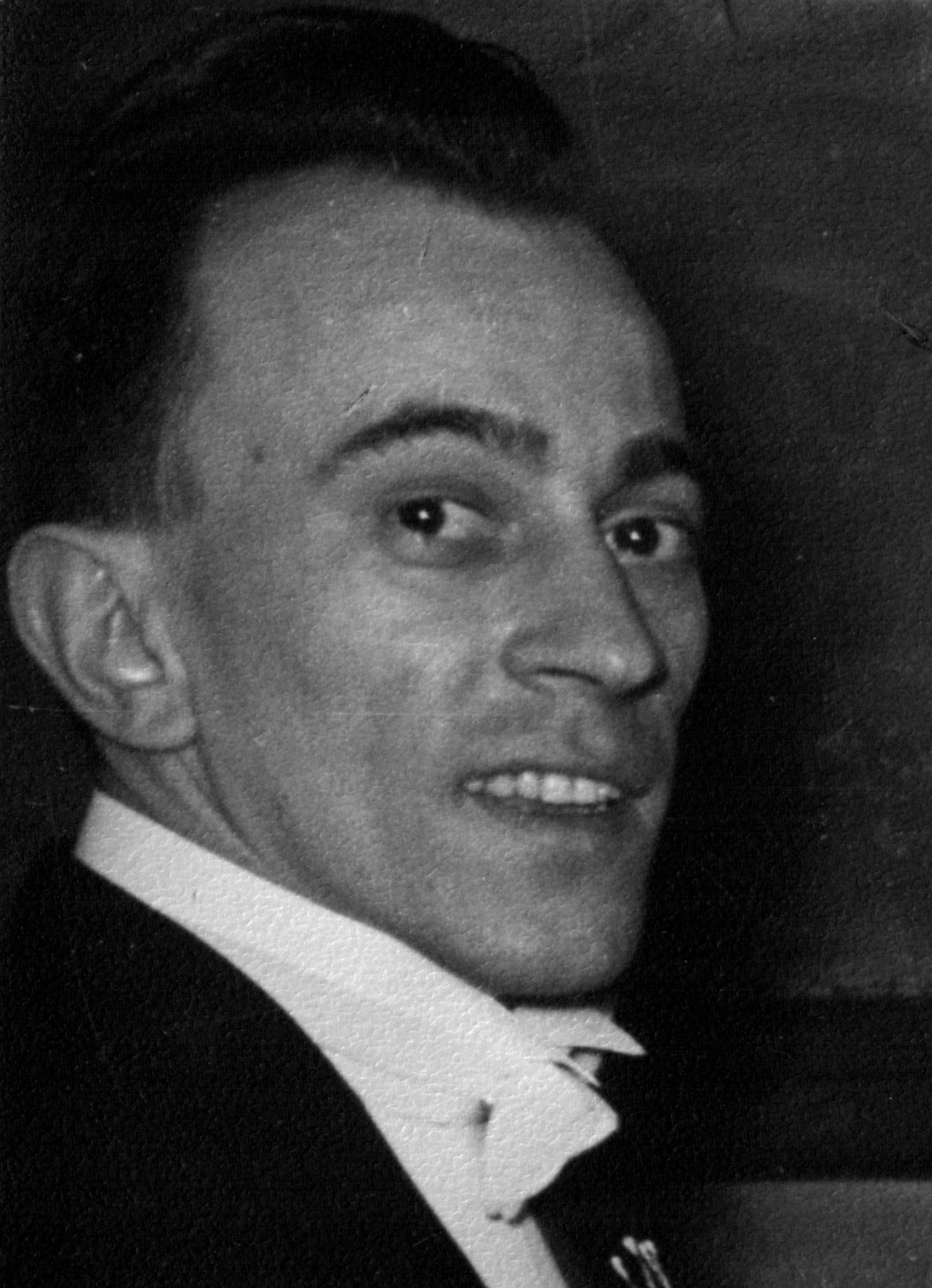
George Kapitan, 1950

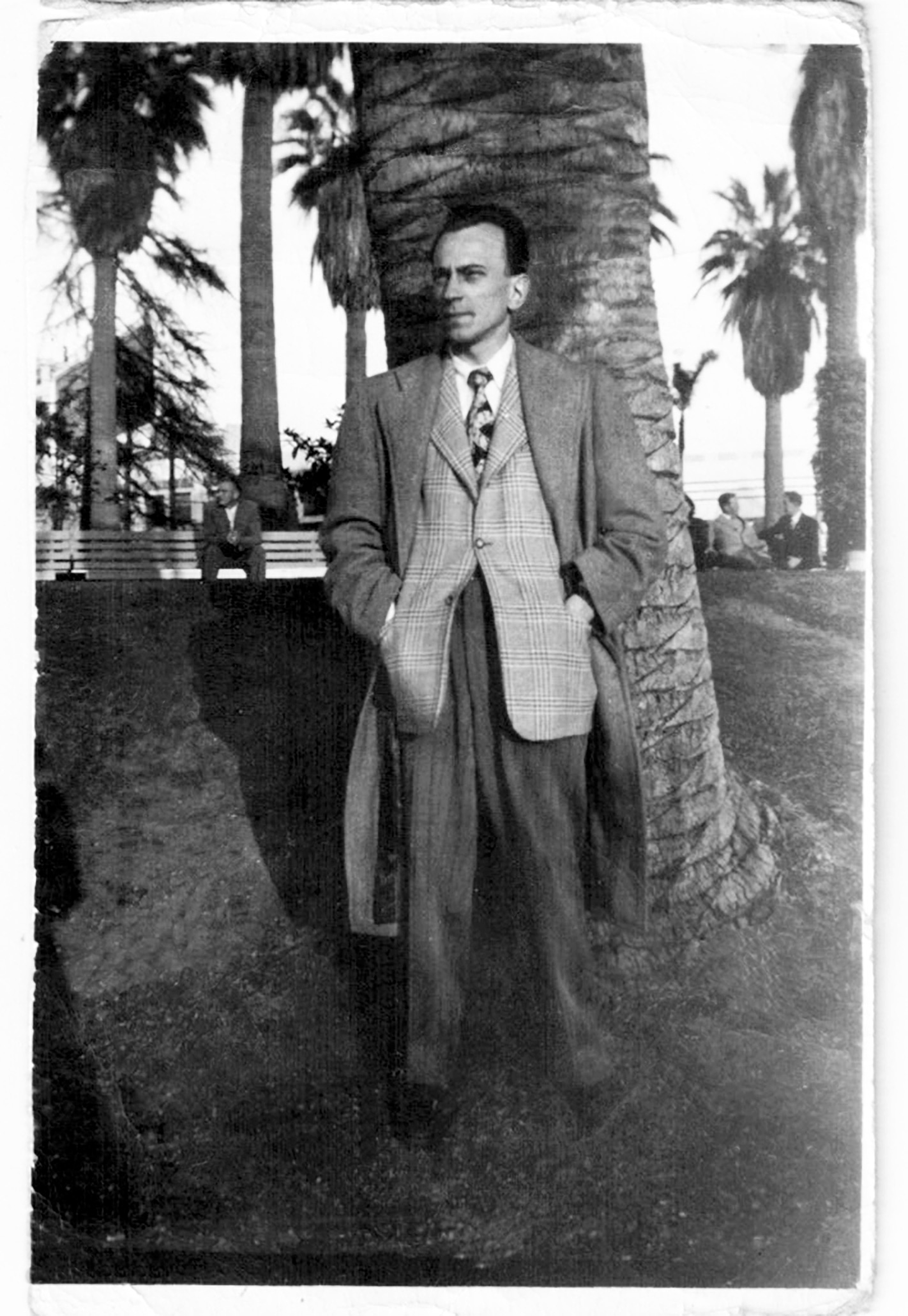
George Kapitan, Los Angeles California, abt 1947

George Kapitan (July 23, 1919 – November 27, 1996) was an American writer for Timely Comics, the 1940s predecessor of Marvel Comics, during the time fans and historians call the Golden Age of Comics. He co-created the medium's first costumed, superpowered female protagonist, the Golden Age Black Widow, an antiheroine who killed evildoers to deliver their souls to Satan, her master.

== Biography ==
George Gregory Kapitan was born in 1919 in The Bronx, New York City, New York, USA to Gregory Kapitan who immigrated from Spile Greece and Anna Mary Darocha Kapitan who immigrated from Galicia Poland.

When he was just 14-years old, he signed up for The Landon School taking lessons and receiving criticism through the mail to learn how to draw. His father told him that he could not make money doing comics but George proceeded regardless. He held onto his first lesson postmarked Nov 29, 1933.

In 1950 he married his lifelong spouse, Rosina "Rose" Olivo and they had three children together living and raising them in the Bronx, New York then moving to Long Island, New York until 1980.

George entered into comics in 1940, creating with artist Harry Sahle the early superhero Green Giant (no relation to the advertising icon) in Pelican Publications' Green Giant Comics #1 (1940), produced by Funnies, Inc., a comic book "packager" that produced outsourced comics for publishers testing the waters of the fledgling medium.

Also in 1940, in Mystic Comics #4 (dated Jul. 1940 in postal indicia, cover dated Aug. 1940), he and Sahle created comic books' first costumed, super-powered female character, the original Black Widow, Claire Voyant, an antiheroine who killed evildoers to deliver their souls to Satan, her master.

He is also the unconfirmed, generally accepted co-creator, with Sahle, of the Centaur Publications superhero the Air Man in Keen Detective Funnies #23 (Aug. 1940).

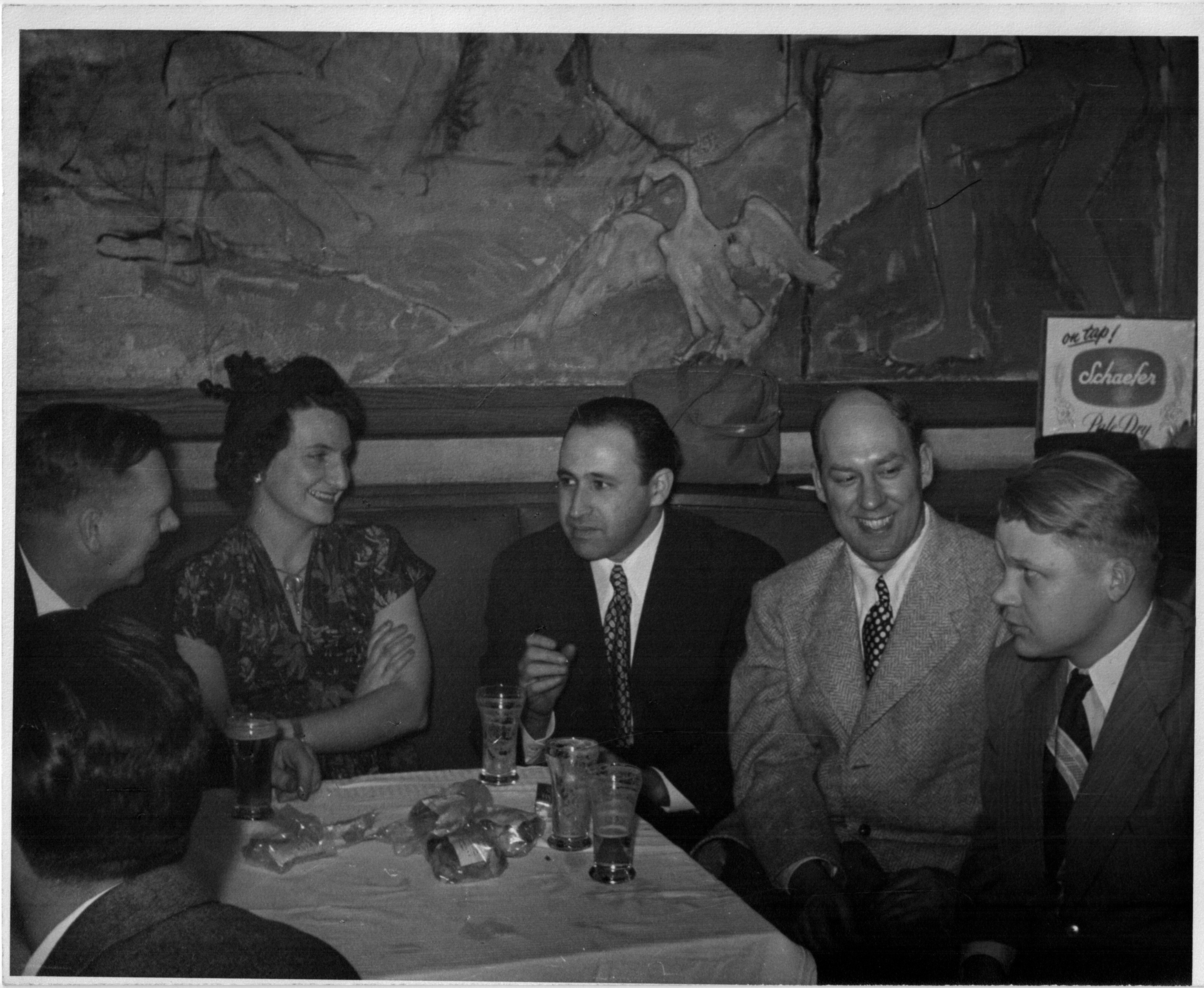
Photo taken at George Kapitan's wedding at Pelham Heath In, Bronx New York on February 19, 1950. Doris and Carl Burgos are seated in the center rear with Harry Sahle to his right (the creator to Harry's right is unidentified at this time).

Other work in the early days of the medium includes writing for the Timely character Fiery Mask (and inking at least one Sub-Mariner story); Hillman Periodicals' feature "Private Parker"; Novelty Press' "Dick Cole", "Blue Bolt" and "Target and the Targeteers"; publisher McCombs' humor feature "Master Marvin"; and even Archie Comics' "Archie".

In Kapitan's 1995 interview on the Dothan Alabama Morning show, he shares about writing the Archie Comics with Harry Sahle. He mentions Harry being responsible for him getting into the business and asking him to come up with ideas for comic books. He states that the first one he came up with was "Air Man", the second one was The Green Giant, followed by The Black Widow.

He was living in Panama City, Florida, at the time of his death in 1996, at age 77.
