= Minimidget =

Superhero

Minimidget, the Miniature Man is a superhero who first appeared in Centaur Comics. Minimidget was written and illustrated by John F. Kolb (1913–2004). After Centaur's collapse in 1942, Minimidget is now in the public domain.

== History ==
He first appeared in Amazing-Man #5 (the first issue, the other four were never published), and in his first story, he and a girl called Ritty are shrunken down to about six inches tall by a scientist named Dr. Anton Barmell. Barmell brings Minimidget to his family home and then has him climb up a drainpipe into the bedroom of his elder brother, whom Minimidget kills with a poisoned needle. After two more such killings – both victims were also Barmell's relatives – the FBI men manage to uncover the truth, after which Minimidget is fatally wounded in a mousetrap. Upon being cornered in his lab, Barmell blows it and himself to kingdom come.

Although Minimidget was supposed to have been killed, in the next issue (#6), he's revived by a paramedic. Free from the spell of Dr. Barmell, he and Ritty fall in love and go on to have many adventures together, in Amazing-Man and then in Stars & Stripes comics.

According to Jess Nevins' Encyclopedia of Golden Age Superheroes, "they have no superpowers, but are smart and adventurous and make use of tiny sports cars and miniature airplanes. They fight men like the Power, a would-be world conqueror with his own island fortress. They are sent into the year 3000 by a scientist, just to see if his "time destroying machine" works."

He last appeared in Amazing-Man #25 (Dec 1941), just before Centaur went out of business.

Minimidget and Ritty's real names were never revealed in the original comics, but in the AC Comics version, he's revealed to be Jack Rhodes, a character who appeared once in Amazing-Man #5.

== Inspiration ==
Kolb's primary influence was Flash Gordon; he even named his son after one of the characters in the Flash Gordon series. Ritty was based on his wife, who died suddenly when his son was a boy. He didn't pick up a pen to draw for more than 30 years after she died, and much of his work was lost during that long depression.

== Other versions ==
In 2015 Gallant Comics launched a new series using the character, The Extraordinary Miniature Man with story and artwork by Steven Butler and Barry Gregory.
