= Mighty Man (comics) =

- Mighty Man (background) on the cover to Protectors #11 (July 1993)

Publication information
- Publisher: Malibu Comics
- First appearance: Amazing-Man Comics #5 (Centaur Comics, September 1939): "Mighty Man"; revamped in 1992 by Malibu in Protectors #1 (November 1992)
- Created by: Centaur Comics: Martin Filchock; Malibu Comics: R. A. Jones; Thomas Derenick

In-story information
- Alter ego: Scott Pearson
- Species: Lost race of giants from Canada
- Team affiliations: Protectors
- Abilities: Enhanced strength, agility and reflexes Invisibility; Shapeshifting

Mighty Man is a comic book superhero and member of a group of superhero characters that make up the Malibu Comics' Protectors. Mighty Man is a pastiche of Giant-Man (of Marvel Comics) and The Atom (of DC Comics).

== Publication history ==
Mighty Man appeared in Centaur Comics' Amazing-Man Comics #5 (September 1939) in the story "Mighty Man" by Martin Filchock. The character was revamped in 1992 by Malibu Comics in Protectors #3 (November 1992).

== Fictional character biography ==
Cover to Protectors #10 (June 1993), art by Thomas Derenick & Mike S. Miller.

While exploring an isolated region of northern Canada, Professor Richard Pearson happened upon a hidden valley of a lost city. The valley was inhabited by a race of giants, with only one of them surviving, a giant child. Prof. Pearson decided to 'adopt' the giant youth, who stood 12 feet tall, and brought him to the United States. Dr. Francis Hilldale, a confidant of Prof. Pearson, attempted an experiment that would shrink the giant child to normal size. After the experiment, the giant child, Scott Pearson found that he could alter his size at will, whether growing to a height of 20 feet or shrinking to the size of a doll. Being the last surviving member of his lost race, Mighty Man is in a lot of ways a true 'alien'. Though not from America, he takes pride in being part of a team determined to protect it, at all costs.

== Powers and abilities ==
Mighty Man's main powers involve size manipulation. In the Protectors comic book, he is able to grow greater than 20 ft and his strength increased with increased size. Mighty Man also has the ability to shrink at will, retaining his normal strength level while being the size of a doll.
