= Sheng Long =

Video game character hoax

- Street Fighter character
- Sheng Long from Electronic Gaming Monthly
- First appearance: Electronic Gaming Monthly (1992)
- First game: Street Fighter 6 (2023)
- Created by: Ken Williams
- Designed by: Ken Williams (1993); Mike Vallas (1997); Shigenori Kiwata (2017)

Sheng Long is a character hoax related to the Street Fighter series, created by Electronic Gaming Monthly as an April Fools' prank in 1992. Conceived by editor Ken Williams due to a mistranslation suggesting the existence of a character named Sheng Long in Capcom's fighting game, Street Fighter II, the publication released an article describing a method to fight the character in the game. Despite intending it to be an obvious joke, many players took it seriously, and other publications reprinted the details as fact without verifying its legitimacy, causing the Sheng Long hoax to spread worldwide. As a result, the magazine later acknowledged it was indeed a hoax, though it revisited the concept for a similar joke in 1997. Claiming Sheng Long would appear in Street Fighter III, they provided a backstory for the character and an appearance designed by editor Mike Vallas. Despite the article trailing off and being incomplete, it resulted in confusion between the North American and Japanese branches of Capcom, with the former calling the latter to ask why they had not been informed about the character.

As a character and a hoax, Sheng Long has been described as one of the most famous and well-known legends related to video gaming by publications such as UGO.com and GameSpot. Several publications have attributed the hoax with the creation of Street Fighter character Akuma, who was added to Super Street Fighter II Turbo as a secret boss with several similarities to the original joke. Fan appeal for the character affected later Capcom titles, with public requests for the inclusion of Sheng Long in an actual video game leading to the consideration of his inclusion in the Street Fighter: The Movie video game and the appearance of the character Gouken as both a secret boss and playable character in Street Fighter IV. Capcom has also added in-game achievements referencing Sheng Long in Street Fighter II re-releases, and for the 25th anniversary of the hoax temporarily posted artwork and a profile for the character on their website, this time designed by Shigenori "Kiki" Kiwata. This version of the character was later reused for his appearance as a non-player character in the World Tour mode of Street Fighter 6, acting as a high-difficulty optional boss.

== Origin ==
The name Sheng Long comes from a mistranslated portion of the name of a special move performed by the series' main character, Ryu; the characters shō ryū (昇龍, rising dragon) from Shōryūken (昇龍拳), Ryu's flying uppercut, are shēng lóng in Chinese pinyin. This was carried into one of Ryu's quotes to defeated opponents in the English localization of the 1991 arcade game Street Fighter II, changing the Japanese quote "If you cannot overcome the Shoryuken, you cannot win!" (昇龍拳を破らぬ限り、お前に勝ち目はない！, Shōryūken o yaburanu kagiri, omae ni kachime wa nai!) to "You must defeat Sheng Long to stand a chance." As a result, players were given the impression that Ryu was referring to a person instead of the attack.

The Super Nintendo Entertainment System (SNES) port of Street Fighter II, released shortly after the April Fools' prank, changed the translation to "You must defeat my Dragon Punch to stand a chance." However, the English instruction manual for the SNES Street Fighter II referred to "Master Sheng Long" as Ryu and Ken's teacher. Instruction manuals for later ports to the SNES and Sega Mega Drive consoles replaced all references to Sheng Long by referring to Ryu and Ken as disciples of the "Shotokan school of karate". A character named Gouken was later introduced in Masaomi Kanzaki's 1993 Street Fighter II manga as Ryu and Ken's sensei and was adapted into the series' backstory in Super Street Fighter II Turbo.

=== Original April Fools' article ===
Coupled with edited screenshots, the hoax inspired many to try and fight Sheng Long in Street Fighter II.

The mistranslation spawned rumors about the existence of a Sheng Long character in the game, and players sent letters to video game publications attempting to confirm the character's existence. Electronic Gaming Monthly editor Ken Williams, who was an avid Street Fighter II player, also took an interest in the rumor, feeling there had to be some secrets in the game due to his experiences with the first Street Fighter arcade game. Wanting to try the office's newly acquired Adobe Photoshop software, he modified screenshots of the game to "create" a "secret boss" by combining sprites from different characters, using it as a way to let off steam due to the stresses of work. Pleased with the results he invited the other writers over, who enjoyed the humor and encouraged Williams to create a second screenshot of the character, with Ray Price suggesting to give the character a flaming fist version of Ryu's "Shoryuken" special attack. Unsure what to do with the screenshots at this point, and with their April issue approaching, they invited founding editor Steve Harris over and proposed using the images for an April Fools' Day prank article. Harris took one look and responded "Make it happen."

As a result, in the April 1992 issue of the video game magazine, a method was "revealed" to reach Sheng Long in the arcade game. The article claimed that the character could be found if a player using Ryu did not let the character suffer any damage during the entire game. Upon reaching the final match against the game's boss M. Bison, the player had to avoid hitting Bison and being hit by him until the time limit expired, thus ending the round in a draw. After repeating this for ten consecutive rounds Sheng Long would then appear out of nowhere and throw Bison off of the edge screen and out of the way. The game's on-screen timer would then stop at 99 seconds, resulting in a "fight to the death" between Ryu and Sheng Long. As a character Sheng Long was stated to feature the special moves of all the fighters, such as Chun-Li's "Spinning Bird Kick" and Sagat's "Tiger Shot", but inflict more damage. In addition, the character was supposedly faster than any other fighter in the game, negating the pause between projectile attacks. Other attacks mentioned included an air-based throw attack and the aforementioned "Shoryuken" covered in flames to represent his greater power. The "ridiculous requirements" to encounter Sheng Long were intended to help cue readers in that the article was indeed a joke, however they felt they needed more to make that clear. Editor Martin Alessi suggested adding an "Honorable Mention" to "W.A. Stokins" ("waste tokens") of "Fuldigen, HA" ("fooled again, ha"). Williams felt that nobody would fall for the joke without being incredibly gullible.

However, people did indeed try to find the character, with arcade owners sending complaints to the magazine that their machines were being broken: large amounts of quarters were being deposited by players, causing them to eventually get stuck. The magazine also received a large volume of hate mail by players themselves, who were complaining that the requirements were impossible. Rival publication GamePro also received letters from players asking to verify the authenticity of Sheng Long, much to the chagrin of their editor Dan Amrich. Compounding matters, publications from Europe, Hong Kong and other countries reprinted the trick without verifying it or asking Electronic Gaming Monthly's permission causing the hoax to spread worldwide. Capcom's North America branch also for a time changed their introductory message for their corporate line to address the hoax, instructing anyone calling about Sheng Long to call Electronic Gaming Monthly's offices instead. Though Williams was unconcerned with the reaction due to only being known at the publication as "Sushi-X", the other writers were. In their December issue of that year revealed, Electronic Gaming Monthly noted that it was a hoax, and were surprised at the worldwide coverage the joke received.

=== April Fools' 1997 ===
During the development of Street Fighter III, fans discussed the prospect of the character's inclusion in the new title. By this point in time Capcom had introduced the backstory character Gouken, who had been killed by his brother Akuma, a playable character added to later iterations of Street Fighter II. Taking advantage of this, Electronic Gaming Monthly perpetuated the hoax again in 1997 by claiming that Sheng Long was in the game, and provided character artwork depicting his appearance alongside new screenshots which were all photoshopped works by editor Mike Vallas. Unlike the first article, they did not finish their explanation of how to reach him, ending the article with "To reach him, you will need at least six perfects and..." Additionally, the words "April Fools" were spelled out in the first letter of the first ten sentences of the article.

The character's design was expanded on greatly in the article; Sheng Long was now stated to be the American localization name for the character Gouken. His profile listed in the article paralleled Gouken's, but instead of Akuma killing him he was knocked into a raging river. The result gave him a scar over his eye, and a desire to get revenge on his brother. To this end, he revived several "killing techniques" of his fighting style, which included an air version of Akuma's red "Hadouken" projectile attack that knocked his opponent down, a ground high-low projectile that could be used on the ground, an unblockable "Denjin-Shinryuu-Ken" super attack that would shock the opponent, an air rapid "Hadouken" super attack akin to a move used by Ibuki, and a third super attack intended to be a stronger version of Akuma's "Shun Goku Satsu". In a later issue, the staff reported that despite this being the second Sheng Long joke, it was convincing enough that Capcom of America called the company's headquarters in Japan asking why they had not been told that the character was in the game.

== Legacy ==
The April Fool's joke has seen significant discussion in media outlets since its debut, with IGN describing it as having the biggest impact of all of Electronic Gaming Monthly's April Fools jokes, while UGO.com named it one of video gaming's greatest urban legends, noting its impact upon the series' success. Capcom community manager Seth Killian described the hoax as "a part of gaming history", comparing Sheng Long to the Konami Code. However, Tom Coulter of GamesRadar+ listed it as one of the video game legends he never wanted to hear about again, stating that while it was a good prank at first, it had gone from "sly wink to the fans" to "Borat t-shirt."

The rumor is often credited with inspiring the creation of Akuma, a character who debuted as a hidden final boss in Super Street Fighter II Turbo, due to their similarities, although Capcom has never confirmed nor denied this. As in the hoax, the process of fighting Akuma would require certain achievements met during the game, with Akuma interrupting the final match of the game between the player and M. Bison. "The similarity was nodded at in the high-definition remake of Super Street Fighter II Turbo, in which an Xbox 360 Achievement titled "Sheng Long is in Another Castle" could be earned for defeating Akuma in the game's arcade mode. Despite the lack of direct confirmation from Capcom, the staff of Electronic Gaming Monthly felt the character was added in response to the hoax, with Williams stating that they were "flabergasted that something we did had an impact on the industry like that."

=== Street Fighter: The Movie ===
Sheng Long is mentioned four times in the 1995 arcade game Street Fighter: The Movie in the endings for Ryu, Ken, and Akuma. In each, he is stated as the master of Ryu and Ken, and Akuma's brother, but never stated as dead. Despite the repeated mention, Sheng Long does not appear in the game. On January 30, 2007, the game's designer, Alan Noon, appeared on Shoryuken.com's forum and discussed aspects of the game cut during development, among them a playable Sheng Long character.

According to Noon, talk had circulated about adding extra characters that were not in the film. As the Sheng Long hoax and Akuma's debut in Super Street Fighter II Turbo were fairly recent at the time, the designers asked for Capcom's permission to add both characters into the game. Capcom approved the addition of Akuma, but denied the inclusion of Sheng Long. However, Capcom later unexpectedly approved the addition of Sheng Long. Noon designed Sheng Long's appearance for the title, giving him black gi pants and a long, green, padded/quilted, sleeveless Gi style top which was tied off with a black belt mandarin style, long white braided hair, Fu Manchu moustache, a thick black ribbon over his eyes due to being blinded by Akuma and one hand taking the form of a dragon's claw, described as a result of his power being so advanced, that he began to physically manifest dragon like attributes. Capcom approved the design and Luis Mangubat, an artist from the development team (who would later work at Midway Games), posed as Sheng Long. However, the character was left unfinished because of time constraints.

=== Street Fighter IV ===
In an interview in the January 2008 Issue of Electronic Gaming Monthly, Street Fighter IV producer Yoshinori Ono stated "Let's just say that [jokes] that your magazine have reported in the past might find their way into the game as fan service." Executive editor Shane Bettenhausen took this to mean the appearance of Sheng Long in Street Fighter IV, though added that if the character did appear in the game, it would be Gouken. When asked in a later interview by 1UP.com regarding the possibility of Sheng Long's appearance in the title, Ono replied "Are you coming to the Tokyo Game Show? How about you ask me that question again then." Capcom later revealed Gouken as a character in Street Fighter IV, with Ono stating in an interview with Play magazine that his inclusion in the title was in response to fans requesting Sheng Long's presence in the game.

2017 artwork of Sheng Long by Capcom. "USO" is Japanese for lying, used to imply the profile is fake

On the first of April 2008, Capcom announced Sheng Long as a "secret, unlock-able character" in their Japanese development blog for Street Fighter IV and later posted in their official US blog accompanied with a silhouette of the character. The post took the tone of a Capcom representative trying to announce a character without giving away too many details, hinting that "Sheng Long is Ryu's..." then holding back and saying to wait for an official character announcement. In a similar fashion to the original joke, the post lists the method to unlock him as requiring the player to win every round as Ryu without taking any damage whatsoever and then perform his "Shoryuken" move during the final boss fight. Reception to the joke the third time was negative and included criticism from 1UP.com. The following day, the Japanese website confirmed that it was indeed a joke and explained the origin of Sheng Long while adding "Sheng-Long is still now and always will be, truly a character of legend."

=== Street Fighter 6 ===
In March 2017, 25 years after the original hoax was published, Capcom gave Sheng Long a joke profile in the Shadaloo Combat Research Institute part of their Capcom Fighters Network website, which showcased artwork and profiles for every character related to the Street Fighter series. Satirizing the Sheng Long rumor, it states that he became a living legend, appears after consecutive draw games, his moves are impossible to counterattack and always register as counter hits and that anyone that sees him will die after 24 hours. Drawn by Shigenori "kiki" Kiwata, the artwork resembles his appearance in Electronic Gaming Monthly's Street Fighter III April Fools article, except instead of long hair and a beard this version sports a long mohawk and a mustache forked upwards, while his biography stated he stands 6 ft 1 in (185 cm) tall. A small note at the bottom of the page stated it would be deleted after 48 hours, and shortly after it was completely removed.

Sheng Long appears as a non-playable character in the "World Tour" mode of Street Fighter 6 whom players fight atop the SiRN building at night after completing the game. Using Ryu's fighting style, he has been described as one of the mode's hardest opponents.

== Comics ==
- Sheng Long would later make an appearance in the 1993 Malibu Comics as Ryu and Ken's master, where he is poisoned by an evil clone of Ryu created by the comic's villain.
- A Hong Kong manhua based on Street Fighter II by Jademan Comics even altered their story to include the character in response.
- In Street Fighter Origins: Sagat (2023), a graphic novel written by Chris Sarracini with art by Joe Ng and published by Udon Entertainment, Sheng Long falsely assumes the identity of the legendary master Gen in an attempt to gain notoriety. The plan, however, has an unexpected outcome: while maintaining the charade, he ends up crossing paths with the real Gen, who reveals the secret move and defeats the imposter.

== See also ==
- Ermac, a hoax character from Mortal Kombat who later became a playable character.
