= Rocket Ranger =

1988 video game

- Developer: Cinemaware
- Publishers: Cinemaware; NES; Kemco * Seika
- Producer: John Cutter
- Designer: Kellyn Beeck
- Programmers: Peter Kaminski; Tom McWilliams
- Artists: Rob Landeros; Jeffrey Hilbers
- Writer: Robert Jacob
- Composer: Bob Lindstrom
- Platforms: Amiga, MS-DOS, Commodore 64, Atari ST, Apple IIGS, FM Towns, NES
- Release: June 1988: Amiga; NA: June 1988; EU: 1988 MS-DOS; NA: October 1988; EU: 1988 C64; NA: November 1988; EU: 1988 Atari ST; EU: January 1989; NA: July 1989 Apple IIGS; NA: July 1989 NES; NA: June 1990
- Genre: Action-adventure
- Mode: Single-player

Rocket Ranger is a 1988 action-adventure game developed and published by Cinemaware. The game's setting is based in the World War II era, allowing the player to control a US Army scientist and setting out to stop Nazi Germany from winning the war. The Rocket Ranger moniker stems from the rocket pack the player uses over the course of the game.

Like many Cinemaware games, Rocket Ranger draws its inspiration from Hollywood, and likely The Rocketeer comics. This title pays homage to the many 1950s science fiction serials, using the look and feel of the serials, including action-packed cut-scenes and an art treatment loyal to the futuristic visions of that era. It also features the cliché elements of that era, including a dashing, courageous hero and a beautiful, voluptuous damsel in distress in need of rescue.

== Plot summary ==
Sitting in a top secret bunker one night puzzling over some challenging physics problems, some futuristic artifacts are teleported to the player—in the role of a US Army scientist—along with a note that says the artifacts are from the future, a future in which the Nazis won World War II and subsequently were able to enslave the entire world. The scientists who sent the artifacts did so in a hope that the player could reverse the outcome of the war, a war Nazi Germany will have lost.

The success of the Nazis is based on their use of a mineral named lunarium, which only exists on Earth's moon and has the ability to lower the IQ of human males drastically, thus effectively preventing military resistance when the Nazis invade. The lunarium is dropped in the form of bombs from a fleet of zeppelins flying at a higher altitude than anti-aircraft guns could possibly reach.

Using a rocket pack and a radium pistol, the player must fly around the world fighting the escalating Nazi technology. Sometimes this includes shooting down enemy fighters with the radium pistol to intercept enemy shipments. Sometimes the sequences degenerate into bareknuckle fistfights with enemy Nazi guards in order to gain rocket parts, and sometimes he has to disable the defenses of two available lunarium depots to get fuel for both his own rocket pack and the rocket ship he must assemble.

From time to time, the hero must catch up with the kidnapped scientist Dr. Barnstoff and his voluptuous daughter Jane (the love interest for the game) in a zeppelin. In these encounters the player must engage in dialogue with them (notably for the time, featuring digitized speech) to win their trust. Another part of the game takes the form of a strategy game: from a world map display the player directs five agents to search for hidden Nazi bases and they can also "organise resistance" to slow the enemy's advance towards the US.

The ultimate goal of the game is to collect five parts for a rocket ship and 500 units of lunarium to get to the Moon and close down the mines. As it turns out, the Nazis were not the only party involved: an "Interplanetary Union of Fascists", which was formed by aliens, have struck a deal with the Germans, aiding their world conquest with their technology. In order to achieve final victory, the Rocket Ranger must battle one of these aliens.

== Gameplay ==
The strategy game requires the player to deploy up to five agents to different nations with one of two objectives; infiltrate or organize a local resistance. The former allows the player to discover critical items to complete the game. The latter allows the player to delay the invasion of the United States.

Agents deployed in the strategy game will often give information on targets of interest or missions. These events require the player to fly there using the rocket pack via the take-off mini-game. This mini-game requires the player to time their button pushes to their character's steps in order to build enough speed for takeoff.

These are missions which require the player to engage in air combat against enemy fighters, a Zeppelin, and ground anti-aircraft guns, depending on the mission. The player flies in third-person while shooting their gun at targets ahead.

These are missions which require the player to assault a Nazi base. This involves the player destroying enemy machine gun emplacements while ducking behind cover.

These are missions which involve the player going into hand-to-hand combat with a Nazi soldier.

The Rocket Pack, a technological marvel in the setting of the game, serves as the primary mode of transportation. Players choose destinations by selecting them through a world map and by utilizing the code wheel copy protection system.

To fly from location to location, the rocket pack must be filled with a very specific amount of fuel. Too much or too little will cause the hero to overshoot or fall short of the target, and as a result plunge to his death. The player could determine the correct amount of fuel for a starting/destination pair using a code wheel, the "secret decoder wheel" included with the game. This element of the game was actually a form of copy protection. The idea was that since the wheel was included with the game and couldn't easily be duplicated, only legitimate purchasers of the game could successfully use the game.

Because the wheel needed to be used for every trip the Ranger made, it got heavy use. As a result, the wheel often fell apart (the front part of the wheel became separated from the back) after several games. The wheels could still be used, but it was more difficult when they weren't connected. Therefore, some users constructed tables that included all of the codes needed to travel from one location to another. These tables eventually made their way to bulletin board systems and (later) the Internet and used as a tool for pirated versions of the game.

== Ports ==
Like most Cinemaware titles, this game was originally developed on the Amiga, one of the more capable home computers of the era. It was later ported to the other platforms, scaling down the graphic and sound quality to the best those systems could deliver. The other platforms this title was ported to includes Atari ST, MS-DOS, Commodore 64 and Nintendo Entertainment System. In 1989, an Apple IIGS port was released, with a vastly superior musical soundtrack score (in terms of music synthesis quality) composed by Bob Lindstrom, with graphics comparable to the original.

=== Alternate media ===
- A different Amiga version of the game exists with invading extraterrestrial aliens as antagonists, instead of German Nazis. This is a localised version for Germany, where references to Nazis and swastikas were not allowed in video games at the time, not even as antagonists. However, the original designs were retained, which raised logical questions about why aliens would adopt German World War II technology and be largely successful with it. This version was also the basis for the NES port, due to Nintendo's strict content restrictions at the time.
- Between 1991 and 1992, Malibu Comics published a Rocket Ranger comic series closely based on the computer game. In the series, the Rocket Ranger - here named Tom Cory - comes to fight Oberst Leermeister, the German officer who oversees the lunarium operation, personally (in the game, Leermeister was more a background character, although it was possible to come face to face with him, in an interrogation sequence). Only five issues were produced, although the cliffhanger at the end of the fifth volume suggests the planned release of at least one sixth issue containing the climactic end battles.
- A Kickstarter campaign for a remake was launched on November 13, 2014 and was fully funded on December 17. It was officially cancelled in November 2015 with refunds being offered that same month.

== Reception ==
Reception

Award
Publication	Award
Golden Joystick Awards	Best 16-bit Graphics of the Year

Computer Gaming World stated that "Playing Rocket Ranger is like living the experience of the old serials". The magazine praised the Amiga version's graphics and sound, but wished for a save-game feature because of its high difficulty and possibility of the game becoming unwinnable from random events. Compute! praised the MS-DOS version's EGA and Tandy graphics, and Orson Scott Card in the magazine favorably cited the game's use of a variety of perspectives, interactive arcade sequences, and "delightful hokum" like the code wheel.

The game was voted Best 16-bit Graphics of the Year at the Golden Joystick Awards. In 1996, Computer Gaming World declared Rocket Ranger the 45th-best computer game ever released, and listed the game's copy-protection penalty as #4 on its list of "the 15 best ways to die in computer gaming".

== See also ==
- Hypothetical Axis victory in World War II
