= Harry Sahle =

American comic book artist (1912–1950)

- Born: Harry Frank Sahle; April 18, 1912 Cleveland, Ohio, U.S.
- Died: September 22, 1950 (aged 38) New York, New York, U.S.
- Areas: Penciler, inker, editor, cartoonist
- Notable works: Archie Comics' Archie; Timely Comics' Black Widow; Quality Comics' "Candy"

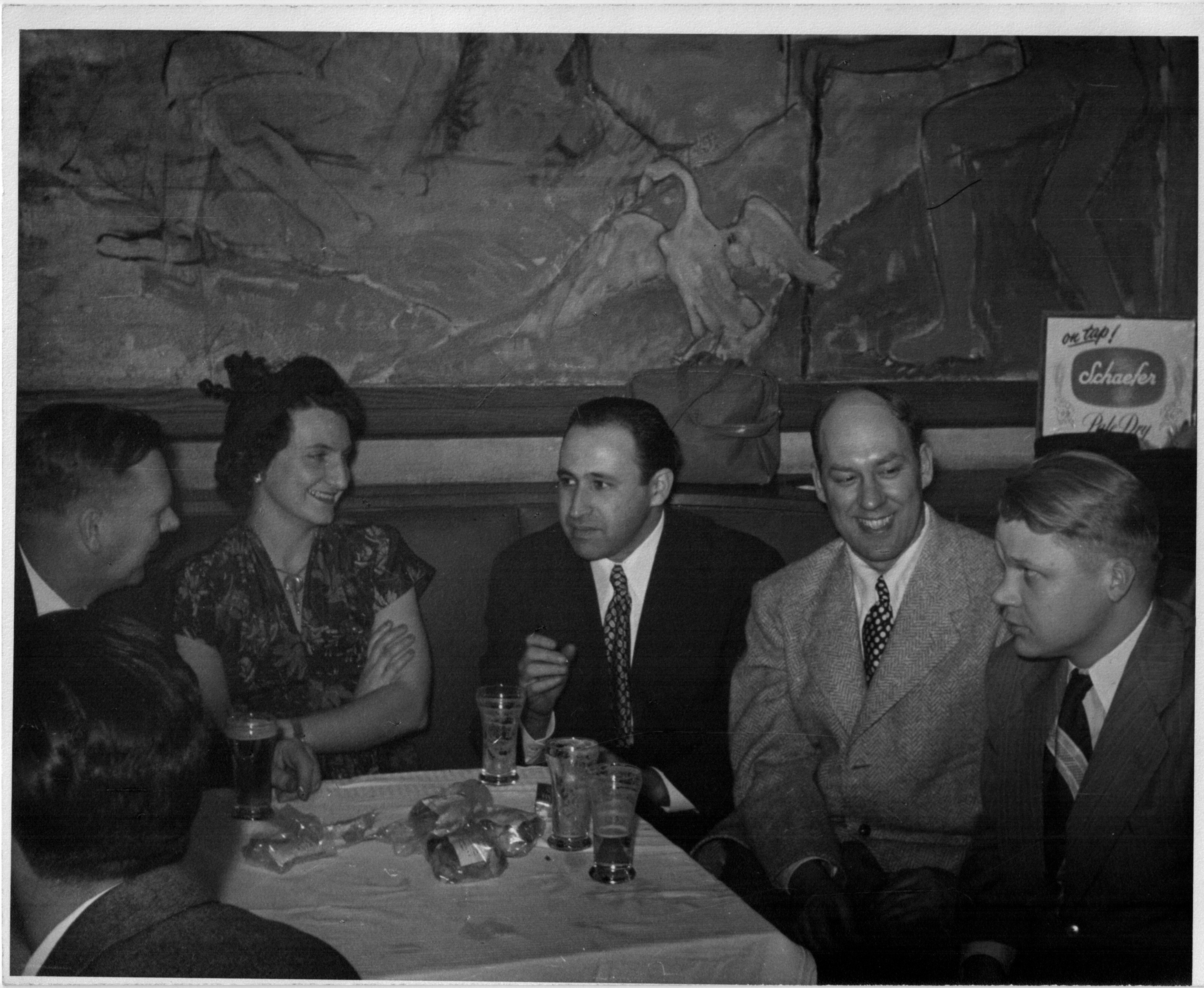
Doris and Carl Burgos (back center) with Harry Sahle to their right (gentleman to his right is unidentified). Photo taken at George Kapitan's wedding on 2/19/1950 at the Pelham Health Inn, Bronx, New York City, New York. Harry passed just six months after this photo was taken.

Harry Frank Sahle (April 18, 1912 – September 22, 1950) was an American comic book artist who drew for such publishers as Archie Comics—helping create the defined look of Archie Comics' breakout character, Archie Andrews—Quality Comics and the Marvel Comics precursor company Timely Comics during the 1930s-1940s period historians and fans call the Golden Age of Comic Books.

In 1940, with writer George Kapitan, Sahle co-created the Timely character the Black Widow, comics' first costumed, superpowered female protagonist. Sahle also created the long-running, early teen-humor character Candy, writing and drawing her comic misadventures for most of the character's 1944 to 1956 run in Quality Comics' Police Comics and in her own solo title, as well as in a newspaper comic strip.

== Biography ==
=== Early career ===
Harry Sahle was born in Cleveland to Edward Sahle and Sarah Jewell. His mother died when he was young and he grew up in Cleveland with his father and his father's parents, who were both born in Switzerland.

Sahle drew gag cartoons for Boys' Life magazine between 1938 and 1939, before entering the fledgling medium of comic books via the Harry "A" Chesler Studio and Funnies Inc., two Manhattan-based "packagers" that provided complete, outsourced comics for early publishers testing the medium. Among his earliest comics work is a cover for the only issue of Pelican Publications' Green Giant Comics (Jan. 1940).

His earliest-known interior credit is inking the seven-page Fiery Mask superhero story "The Jelly of Doom", over George Kapitan's pencil art, in Timely Comics' Daring Mystery Comics #5 (June 1940). With Kapitan writing and himself penciling and inking, Sahle co-created the Black Widow in Mystic Comics #4 (Aug. 1940). Not to be confused with the superhero Black Widow introduced in the 1960s by Timely's descendant Marvel Comics, this character — comics' first costumed, superpowered female protagonist — was a supernatural antihero who gathered deserving souls for Satan.

Other early work includes co-creating the winged superhero the Air Man in Centaur Publications' Keen Detective Funnies #23 (Aug. 1940); and creating or co-creating the Timely superheroine the Silver Scorpion, in Daring Mystery Comics #7 (April 1941), for which he signed his art with the pen name Jewell, which comics historian Michael J. Vassallo believes marked a collaboration with another, unknown artist. Sahle also worked as an assistant to Carl Burgos, creator-artist of Timely star the Human Torch. Per fellow artist and Golden Age contemporary Gil Kane, Sahle was also occasionally a ghost artist on work credited to Burgos in issues of Marvel Mystery Comics, Captain America Comics, and the eponymous character's own title, Human Torch.

=== MLJ Comics ===
Artist Gil Kane recalled that after the writers and artists Charles Biro, Bob Wood, Bob Montana and several others left MLJ Comics to move to Lev Gleason Publications, it fell largely to Irv Novick to steer MLJs stable of superhero characters. Shortly afterward, Sahle joined the company, working on characters including The Black Hood, Steel Sterling, and the Shield between 1942 and 1943, and soon thereafter working on the character that was to become MLJ's breakout success: Archie Andrews.

With the departure of Montana, Archie's signature early developer, Sahle drew "what became the new Archie character.... [H]is work was based on Montana, but with adaptation and interpretation", Kane recalled. Sahle drew some of the earliest stories featuring what would become the company's namesake character, beginning by at least Archie Comics #3 (Summer 1943).

Thanks to his work, "Sahle became the center point [of MLJ/Archie], and Novick went into the Army", recalled Kane, who believes Sahle worked for MLJ for a year-and-a-half before joining the Army himself. At some point, Sahle was hired away from MLJ by "Busy" Arnold and his Quality Comics.

=== "Candy" ===
Sahle went on to create the Quality Comics teen-humor feature "Candy," starring typical small-town American girl Candace O'Connor of Hartwick, USA. Her supporting cast included her boyfriend, Ted Dawson; her rival, Cornelia Clyde; and gal-pals Tina and Trish. Debuting as a backup feature in Police Comics #37 (Dec. 1944), "Candy" appeared in the comic until issue #102 (Oct. 1950), when the regular line-up of characters (including Candy, Will Eisner's The Spirit, etc.) were dropped and the title became a "regular crime comic." Candy continued to star in her own title, Candy, which ran 64 issues (Fall 1947 - July 1956). Six months after the title ceased publication, Quality Comics as a whole closed its doors.

In addition to Candy's comic-book adventures, Sahle and writer Elmer Groggin produced a Candy newspaper comic strip syndicated by the Chicago Times Syndicate from October 2, 1944. Sometime during 1945, Sahle's strip was then taken over by Tom Dorr, who continued it for a further 25 years (mostly syndicated by the Field Newspaper Syndicate, which succeeded the Chicago Times Syndicate).

Much of Sahle's work was produced in the teen-humor genre, and during the 1940s he also drew another feature, "Ezra," for Quality's Military Comics and Modern Comics titles.

Sahle died in New York City 1950, aged 38. Kane blamed his death on a "broken heart" at a young age.

=== Mike Hammer ===
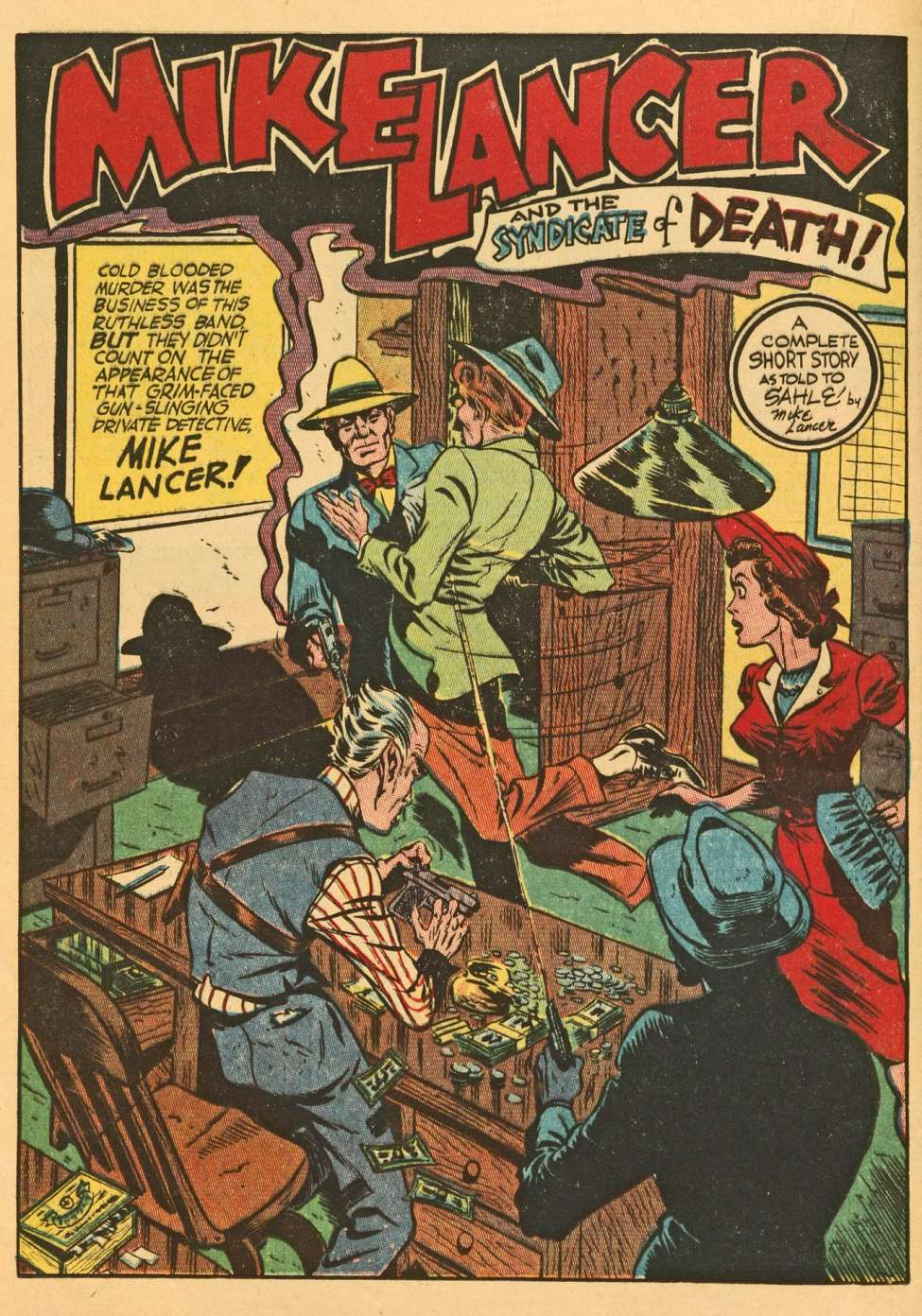
Mike Lancer in Green Hornet Comics #10 (December 1942) art by Harry Sahle

Crime novelist Mickey Spillane, who worked for Lloyd Jacquet's Funnies Inc. packager during the 1930s and 1940s, teamed with Sahle on a number of occasions, including on the character "Mike Danger", which Spillane described as "the original concept of Mike Hammer", the archetypal hardboiled detective of mid-20th century paperback novels. After Spillane's novels were successful, some "Mike Danger" stories saw print in issues of Crime Detector in 1954, and new stories featuring the character were published by Big Entertainment four decades later.

Sahle and Spillance had earlier collaborated on the eponymous feature "Mike Lancer", starring a Mike Hammer prototype, published in Harvey Comics' Green Hornet Comics #10 (Dec. 1942).

=== Reprints ===
Several issues of Sahle's Candy were reprinted, in the late 1950s/early 1960s by Israel Waldman's Super Comics imprint, but her adventures have otherwise remained out of print. In the late 1980s, Eclipse Comics reprinted Sahle's 1940s aviator feature "Bald Eagle" in Air Fighters Classics #1-2 (Nov. 1987 - Dec. 1988). Some Sahle work appears in the anthology Marvel Mystery Comics #1 (Dec. 1999). and the hardcover collections Marvel Masterworks: Golden Age Sub-Mariner, Vol. 1 and Marvel Masterworks: Golden Age Human Torch, Vol. 1 (both 2005).
