= Masked Marvel (Centaur Publications) =

Centuar Publications comic book superhero

The Masked Marvel (Nightmask I)
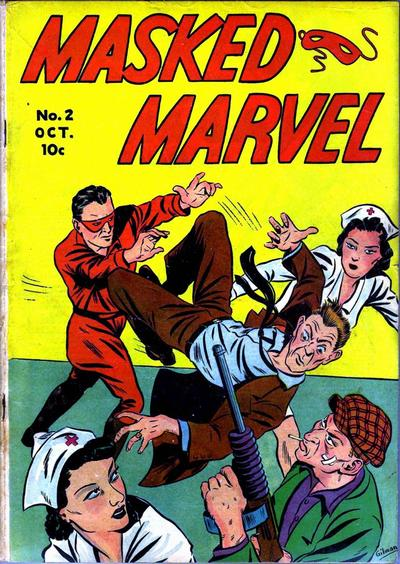
- Cover art for The Masked Marvel #2.

Publication information
- Publisher: Centaur Publications
- First appearance: Keen Detective Funnies Vol. 2 #7 (July 1939)
- Created by: Ben Thompson

In-story information
- Alter ego: Unknown (Centaur Publications); Philip Reinhart (Malibu Comics)
- Team affiliations: ZL, ZR, and ZY; The Protectors (Malibu Comics)
- Partnerships: Richard Reinhart (son) (Malibu Comics)
- Notable aliases: Philip Reinhart
- Abilities: Skilled fighter, inventor and user of gadgets.

The Masked Marvel is a fictional superhero originally published by Centaur Publications. He debuted in July 1939, on the pages of Keen Detective Funnies #7. The character continued to appear as the feature in Keen Detective Funnies until the 24th issue, as well as in his own title, which lasted three issues.

When Centaur Comics went out of business in 1942, he became dormant, until he was revived by Malibu Comics, where he acted as director of the government-run superhero team known as Protectors. His son, who took up his father's identity, became part of the team. Fearing the lawsuit by Marvel Comics, the writers changed Masked Marvel's name to Nightmask (apparently unaware of the irony that Marvel had already created a superhero by that name, as part of their New Universe imprint, six years earlier). Both Nightmasks remained prominent parts of the cast until the title's cancellation. A short time later, Malibu Comics was acquired by Marvel. Since then, Masked Marvel has not appeared aside from occasional appearances in crowd scenes in AC Comics' Femforce.

== Golden Age Masked Marvel ==
The original Masked Marvel is a non-powered scarlet-suited hero whose secret identity is never revealed. He fights crime with the help of a trio of assistants known as ZL, ZR, and ZY. He operates out of a glass-domed mountaintop headquarters. He has a number of gadgets and weapons, such as an amphibious airplane, a paralyzing ray gun and a televisor, a video device which lets him see anywhere in the world.

According to Jess Nevins' Encyclopedia of Golden Age Superheroes, "he fights ordinary criminals like stamp counterfeiters and oil field saboteurs, and he fights extraordinary criminals like the Hawk, groups like a confederation of the four largest criminal syndicates in the country, and the Red Raider, an insane submarine captain turned pirate".

== Nightmask ==
This version was essentially identical to the original, but his back story was fleshed out and expanded. He was revealed to be Philip Reinhart, a young prodigy who already had established a successful business at the age of 20, but his success only left him longing for more. Inspired by The Clock, he became a crime-fighter known as Nightmask. Eventually, the two men met and formed a lasting friendship. When World War II broke out, they decided to give up crime-fighting and enlist, both out of the sense of duty and the feeling that the proliferation of super-powered heroes made them increasingly irrelevant. After the war, Phillip decided to focus on business endeavors. During this time, he was briefly married to Erika Blaine and fathered a son, Richard.

In 1988, the Clock became president in his civilian guise. At the former's request, Phillip became head of the project designed to track various super-powered beings, just in case the government should need their services. That proved to be a prudent measure, as the increasing supervillain activity made the need for a team of super-powered heroes starkly clear. In 1992, Phillip used the intelligence he gathered to form a super-powered team known as The Protectors. He acted as the team's director, charting the overall course of the team while delegating field decisions to Man of War.

== Richard Reinhart ==
Nightmask II (Richard Reinhart) of Protectors #5.

Richard Reinhart was the son of the original Nightmask. At the age of 3, he found himself in the midst of a bitter custody battle between his parents. He eventually wound up living with his mother. He went through his life without much direction, finishing college without earning a degree and spent several years drifting through Europe after leaving college. The relationship between him and his father was strained at best.

When Richard learned about the formation of the Protectors, he petitioned the President directly, asking him to let him be part of team. The request was accepted, much to Richard's father's chagrin.

Richard wore a slightly modified version of his father's costume. He lacked his father's gadgets and possessed no extraordinary skills, but was determined to prove himself in spite of it.

== Marcia Beckworth ==
Nightmask III (Marcia Beckworth) in Protectors.

Marcia Beckworth is a granddaughter of one of the assistants of the original NightMask. She met Richard Reinhart at the grave of her grandfather, and made such a strong impression on him that he asked that she be made his assistant in aiding the Protectors. For a few weeks she was the behind-the-scenes glue that helped the Protectors stick together, acting as a motherly, and guiding figure. After Richard Reinhart died, she was visited at his tomb by the mysterious Eye, and either granted powers or had her latent powers brought forth.
