= Street Fighter (Malibu Comics) =

1993 comic series

Publication information
- Publisher: Malibu Comics
- No. of issues: 3

Creative team
- Written by: Len Strazewski
- Artist(s): Don Hillsman II

Street Fighter is a comic series based on the game series of the same name that ran for three issues from August to November 1993, published by Malibu Comics. Set after the events of the original Street Fighter game, the series focused on M. Bison's attempts at taking over the world and eliminate those Street Fighters that he sees as a threat to his plans.

== Plot ==
Following the end of the previous Street Fighter World Tournament, in which Ryu defeated the decade-long world champion Sagat, Ryu and his friends Ken and Chun-Li have each taken different paths in life. While Ryu continues to train hard and pursue the way of the warrior, Chun-Li has joined Interpol to track down and bring her father's killer to justice and Ken (whom Ryu hasn't seen in a year) has become a celebrity. Sagat, humiliated over his loss to Ryu, has joined the Shadaloo organization to become strong enough to defeat Ryu and reclaim his title. Ken, now a married man, has retired from street fighting and acts in commercials for fun, but continues to train and is still very powerful. After hanging out with friends, Ken is unexpectedly confronted by Balrog, M. Bison's right-hand man (who seemingly joined Shadaloo to repay Bison for getting him off smuggling charges), who fought and lost against Ken in the previous tournament. Although badly beaten by Balrog, Ken overwhelms him with his berserker strength, but armed thugs arrive to help Balrog, who quickly flees from the scene. Ken is relieved that the fight seems to be over, but is soon confronted by a menacing-looking Sagat, who defeats Ken after a long fight and stabs him with a knife, seemingly killing him. Sometime later, a driverless car crashes through Ryu's garden at his home in Japan, and he cries in anguish when he finds Ken's scalp and pieces of his bloodied clothes in the car, in a box marked "for Ryu".

All over the world, various fighters from the previous tournament learn of Ken's apparent death, and vow to avenge him. Meanwhile, Bison continues to train Sagat, keeping his mind occupied on improving his fighting abilities to keep his mind off his guilt for Ken's apparent death and turn him into a killing machine. Bison also has one of his agents poison Ryu and Ken's former master Sheng Long, leaving him paralyzed. Although Bison doubts that Sheng Long will die, he is convinced that he will not be a threat to him for a while, and tells Balrog that Ryu is now their only concern.

On the island of Okinawa, where Sheng Long lives, the great martial arts warrior is being nursed back to health by Nida, a street fighter from the Philippines who came to Okinawa to learn the ways of Shotokan karate, Sheng Long's fighting style. Sheng Long is surprised that his pupils Ryu and Ken haven't come to visit him, but Nida tells him of a new street fighter tournament that is approaching and believes that they might be training for it. Sheng Long promises Nida to teach her Shotokan karate once he recovers, but she fears that he may never be able to overcome the deadly poison in his body. After leaving Sheng Long to rest, Nida goes into another room to train, and smashes a dummy bearing a photo of Ryu, vowing that once she defeats Ken's killer to restore their master's honor, he will have to face her next.

The third and final issue of "Street Fighter" included an epilogue which revealed what would have happened to the various characters had the comic continued. Amongst other developments, Ken would have been revealed to have survived, Ryu and Chun-Li (who were shown to have romantic feelings for each other in the first issue, but had not gone beyond kissing) would have finally ended up together, Sagat would have redeemed himself for siding with Bison, and it would have been revealed that Bison had conspired with "dark forces" to create evil doubles of the various street fighters around the world, one of which (an evil double of Ryu) had killed Nida's father, this being the reason for her grudge against him. According to the epilogue, the comic had been cancelled due to complications with Capcom and their dislike of the comic, and expressed the hope that someone would continue to publish the comic.
