= Arrow (character) =

The Arrow
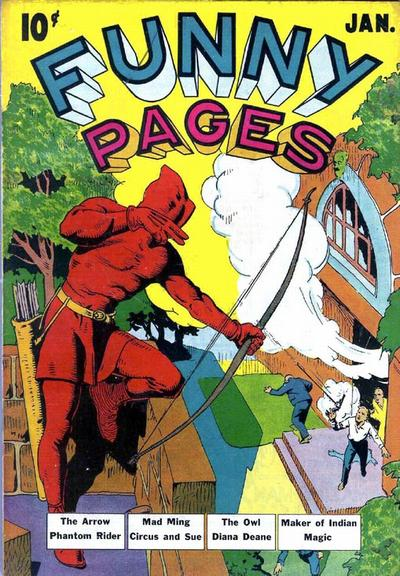
- The Arrow, on the cover of Funny Pages vol. 4, #1 (January 1940), art by Paul Gustavson.

Publication information
- Publisher: Centaur Publications
- First appearance: Funny Pages #21 (September 1938)
- Created by: Paul Gustavson

In-story information
- Alter ego: Ralph Payne (Centaur Comics); Rick Parker (Malibu Comics)
- Team affiliations: The Protectors (Malibu Comics)
- Abilities: Highly skilled archer

The Arrow is a superhero created during the Golden Age of Comic Books. He was the first superhero published by Centaur Publications.

The character first appeared in 1938 in Funny Pages #21 (numbered vol. 2, #10; dated September 1938). He continued in the comic until issue #42 (Oct 1940), and then had his own series, The Arrow, which lasted for three issues from Oct 1940 to Oct 1941.

The Arrow is actually Ralph Payne, a military intelligence agent who uses his archery skills to fight crime. He delivers messages via arrow, both to criminals and the police, and uses his bow to kill the evildoers. Today, the Arrow is mostly remembered for being the first American superhero to rely on archery as a primary gimmick.

== Centaur Publications ==
The character was created for Centaur Publications by Paul Gustavson. After Gustavson's departure from the company, Bob Lubbers took over the strip. During Lubbers' tenure, the character's true identity was revealed for the first time: he was a military intelligence agent named Ralph Payne.

== Malibu Comics ==
Malibu Comics' version of the Arrow.

After Centaur Publications went out of business in 1942, the Arrow, along with most other company properties, lapsed into public domain. The Arrow was briefly revived by Malibu Comics, appearing as part of their Protectors/Genesis imprint. He starred in the Protectors series and the Arrow one-shot. The character has been dormant after Marvel Comics acquired Malibu Comics, although some of his Golden Age adventures were reprinted by AC Comics.

In Malibu Comics' Protectors/Genesis universe, the Arrow is a former intelligence agent named Rick Palmer. Born somewhere in Texas, he grew up to become an avid hunter. His weapon of choice is the bow and arrow, because he feels that said weapons represent the greatest challenge and give the prey the fairest chance. Following a stint with the military, Rick is recruited into one of the intelligence branches of the US government. He is posted in a small, struggling Latin American country caught in the throes of civil war. While there, he witnesses the massacre of an entire village by the modernized forces loyal to that country's government. He eventually learns the country is being funded by the US government. Sickened by what he learned, Rick resigns. He decides to use his archery skills to fight for justice, adopting the crime-fighting identity of the Arrow, the hunter of men.

The Arrow primarily operates alone. At one point, he teams up with a number of heroes during a battle in Brinkston — an event whose ultimate outcome convinces him to retire. When the members of the Protectors are asked to face Mr. Monday and re-form the superhero team, the Arrow requests to join his former comrades, but is refused due to his violent approach.

== Dynamite Entertainment ==
The Arrow is one of the many public domain Golden Age characters appearing in Project Superpowers, a 2008 miniseries released by Dynamite Entertainment. He made several short appearances in the series. He also appears in two Dynamite's series, The Death-Defying 'Devil and Black Terror.

== RZG Comics ==
The Arrow has an appearance in the RZG comic book series Phazer. The issue also includes Daredevil (Lev Gleason Publications).
