= Malibu Comics =

Former comic book company now part of Marvel Comics

Malibu Comics Entertainment, Inc.
- The definitive variant of the Malibu Comics logo
- Formerly: Malibu Graphics (1986–1992)
- Industry: Comics
- Founded: 1986; 40 years ago
- Founder: Dave Olbrich; Tom Mason; Scott Mitchell Rosenberg
- Defunct: 1994; 32 years ago
- Fate: Acquired by Marvel Comics
- Headquarters: Calabasas, California, United States
- Key people: Dave Olbrich (publisher); Tom Mason (creative director); Chris Ulm (editor-in-chief); Scott Mitchell Rosenberg (president)
- Products: The Men in Black; Ultraforce; Night Man
- Parent: Marvel Entertainment Group
- Divisions: Malibu Interactive

Malibu Comics Entertainment, Inc. (launched as Malibu Graphics) was an American comic book publisher active in the late 1980s and early 1990s, best known for its Ultraverse line of superhero titles. Notable titles published by Malibu included The Men in Black, Ultraforce, and Night Man.

The company's headquarters was in Calabasas, California. Malibu was initially publisher for Image Comics from 1992 to 1993. The company's other imprints included Adventure, Aircel and Eternity. Malibu also owned a small software development company that designed video games in the early to mid-1990s called Malibu Interactive.

== History ==
=== Origins ===
Malibu Comics was launched in 1986 as Malibu Graphics by Dave Olbrich and Tom Mason with the private financing of Scott Mitchell Rosenberg, who was operating a comic book distribution company (Sunrise Distribution) at the time. Unbeknownst to most people in the industry, Rosenberg was also financing a number of other small comics publishers: Eternity Comics, Amazing Comics, Wonder Color Comics, and Imperial Comics.

Malibu's output began modestly, with creator-owned black-and-white titles; its first title was David Lawrence and Ron Lim's Ex-Mutants. Other early titles included Dark Wolf, Libby Ellis, The Liberator, and The Trouble With Girls.

=== Mergers/acquisitions of other publishers ===
In 1987, after Rosenberg's behind-the-scenes roles were revealed, he discontinued most of the other small publishers, merging some with Malibu and retaining Eternity Comics as a Malibu brand. At this point, Chris Ulm joined Malibu as editor-in-chief.

In September 1988, Malibu effectively acquired the Canadian publisher Aircel Comics as an imprint, and in January 1989 it acquired Adventure Publications.

From that point forward, the Malibu brand was used for superhero titles. Eternity was used for the magazine line and also for anime-inspired titles like Robotech. (Eternity published Ben Dunn's Ninja High School, one of the first American manga-influenced series.) Adventure was used for Malibu's licensed titles, such as Planet of the Apes and Alien Nation. Aircel was used for Barry Blair's comics and Malibu's adult line.

Other licensed media adaptations included Re-Animator, Planet of the Apes, Star Trek: Deep Space Nine, I Love Lucy, The Three Stooges, Lensman, Captain Harlock, Robotech II: The Sentinels, Logan's Run and Logan's World. Literary and horror adaptations the works of H. P. Lovecraft, Brian Lumley's Necroscope, Keith Laumer's Retief series, and Mary Roberts Rinehart's The Bat.

In 1988, the company also acquired the character Shuriken (a character that was self-published from 1985 to 1988 by Victory Productions) from its creator Reggie Byers. Shuriken was published in three limited series and two one-shots by Malibu; later the character was introduced in the Ultraverse imprint.

=== 1989-1992 ===
By this time, the company was publishing a combination of new series and licensed properties. Later, after a legal battle with the creators, Malibu created a shared universe called Shattered Earth.

In 1992, heroes from Centaur Publications (a Golden Age publisher whose properties fell into the public domain) were revived in the form of the Protectors, consisting of Airman, Amazing-Man, Aura, Arc, Arrow, Ferret, Man of War and Mighty Man, among others. Several of these characters had short-lived spin-off titles of their own. The Centaur heroes and other characters from Adventure (Miss Fury and Rocket Ranger), and Eternity (Dinosaurs for Hire and Ex-Mutants) plus Dead Clown and Widowmaker, were put together in one Universe to form the Genesis line, but it had a short lifespan.

==== Image Comics' publisher of record ====
In early 1992, Malibu served as publisher for the first comics from Image Comics, making the upstart creator-run publisher members of the Malibu Graphics Publishing Group, and giving Image access to the distribution channels. This move led to Malibu obtaining almost ten percent of the American comics market share, temporarily moving ahead of industry giant DC Comics.

By the beginning of 1993, Image's financial situation was secure enough to publish its titles independently, and it left Malibu.

=== Computer coloring pioneer ===
During this period, Rosenberg/Malibu also worked with Adobe Photoshop software to develop the then-leading standard for the computer coloring of comic books. Establishing itself as the first company to use digital coloring for all its titles, Malibu boasted improved production values over traditional comics, and printed on higher-quality paper than most comics publishers of the time. Andy Walton, Mickey Rose, and Shahid Brown were computer colorists with Malibu Comics and worked on many titles, as the young company partnered with Image Comics. One of the main coloring teams was Violent Hues.

=== Malibu Interactive and Ultraverse ===
In late 1992, seeking to capitalize on the growing video game market, Malibu merged with video game developer Acme Interactive to form Malibu Comics Entertainment, Inc., with Malibu Interactive acting as a subsidiary. The company also has a UK office led by Ian McGee, the former producer of Mindscape.

The Ultraverse line was launched in June 1993 during the "boom" of the early 1990s, roughly concurrent with the debut of publishers such as Image and Valiant, and new superhero lines from DC and Dark Horse (Milestone and Comics' Greatest World, respectively). The line was in part intended to fill the gap left by Image's independence.

Emphasizing the tight continuity between the various series in the Ultraverse line, Malibu made extensive use of crossovers, in which a story that began in one series would be continued in the next-shipping issue of another series. Various promotions for special editions or limited-print stories followed. The Ultraverse line came to dominate Malibu's catalog.

The success led Malibu Comics to partner with THQ to develop video games from its comic book characters under the label Malibu Games.

The Bravura imprint, launched in January 1994, was Malibu's creator-owned imprint. Founding members of the Bravura group were Dan Brereton (Nocturnals), Howard Chaykin (Power & Glory), Steven D. Grant & Gil Kane (Edge), Dan Jurgens (Deuce), Walt Simonson (Star Slammers), and Jim Starlin (Breed, Dreadstar). The group was represented by attorney Harris M. Miller II. The "Bravura Gold Stamp Program" encouraged readers to collect stickers from each issue of Breed, Power & Glory, Edge, Dreadstar, and Star Slammers to qualify for various offers, including "the rare" Bravura #0.

Malibu launched the Rock-It Comix imprint for rock music comics in early 1994. Malibu worked with the management firm Gold Mountain Entertainment in dealing with the musicians, while International Strategic Marketing distributed the line to comic book shops, music outlets, and newsstands.

By early 1994, Malibu Comics Entertainment had large numbers of employees in various divisions, including editorial, design, the art department, coloring, imagesetting, marketing, film, finance, and administration.

=== Acquisition by Marvel Comics ===
As sales declined industry-wide in the mid-1990s, Malibu canceled lower-selling series. But the company's biggest problem was its game division — started in an attempt to break into the video game market — which cost Malibu more than $200,000 a month. Nonetheless, the company's assets were still seen as attractive enough to garner interest from DC Comics in the spring of 1994. In addition, Rosenberg and Malibu signed with the William Morris Agency.

Because Malibu had sufficient market share that an acquisition from DC would make the latter surpass Marvel's market share, Marvel decided to purchase Malibu itself to prevent this from happening: on November 3, 1994, Malibu was purchased by Marvel Comics. The video game division was later sold to GameTek, and was renamed to Padded Cell Studios. One of the video game employees was laid off, with Christine Hsu went on to form Paradox Development.

To slow down rumors that the Ultraverse titles would be canceled as soon as the deal closed, Malibu claimed that Marvel wanted Malibu because of its digital coloring system. Meanwhile, in the middle of the following year, 1995, Malibu standard-bearers Mason and Ulm left the company. Around the same time in May–October 1995 (during the "Black September" event) Marvel re-launched a handful of the more popular Ultraverse titles as well as a number of crossovers with Marvel characters. The "volume 2" series each started with "#∞ (infinity)" issues, but these were canceled a short time later. With that, Marvel canceled the entire Ultraverse line. Within the Marvel Comics multiverse, the Genesis Universe is designated as Earth-1136 and the Ultraverse as Earth-93060.

Very little Malibu content was published after 1996.

==== Potential Ultraverse revival ====
In June 2005, when asked by Newsarama whether Marvel had any plans to revive the Ultraverse, Marvel editor-in-chief Joe Quesada replied:

Let's just say that I wanted to bring these characters back in a very big way, but the way that the deal was initially structured, it's next to impossible to go back and publish these books. There are rumors out there that it has to do with a certain percentage of sales that has to be doled out to the creative teams. While this is a logistical nightmare because of the way the initial deal was structured, it's not the reason why we have chosen not to go near these characters, there is a bigger one, but I really don't feel like it's my place to make that dirty laundry public.

In May 2012, Steve Englehart suggested in a podcast interview that the reason Marvel will not presently publish the Ultraverse characters is because five percent of the profits from those books would have to go to the Malibu creators who were still alive. Marvel Editor Tom Brevoort later denied that the five percent was what was holding Marvel back, but was unable to give a real explanation due to a non-disclosure agreement.

It has been speculated that Scott Mitchell Rosenberg's ongoing producer deal for all Malibu properties (and his alleged financial troubles) is another possible factor in why the Ultraverse has never been revived.

== Titles ==
Some of Malibu's titles and imprints included:

=== Genesis (1992–1994) ===
This line made use of many Centaur Publications heroes plus characters previously published by Adventure, Aircel and Eternity:

- Airman #1 (January 1993)
- Arrow #1 (October 1992)
- Dead Clown #1–3 (October 1993 – February 1994)
- Dinosaurs for Hire (volume 2) #1–12 (February 1993 – February 1994)
- Ex-Mutants (volume 2) #1–18 (November 1992 – April 1994)
- The Ferret (volume 1) #1 (September 1992)
- The Ferret (volume 2) #1–10 (May 1993 – March 1994)
- Genesis #0 (October 1993)
- Gravestone #1–7 (1993 – February 1994)
- The Malibu Sun — company's in-house magazine; issue #24 (April 1993) contains a four-page story featuring Widowmaker
- Man of War #1–8 (April 1993 – February 1994)
- Protectors #1–20 (September 1992 – May 1994)
- Protectors Handbook #1 (November 1992)

=== Ultraverse (1993–1997) ===
- The All-New Exiles #1–11 (October 1995 – August 1996)
- Angels of Destruction #1 (October 1996)
- Black September #∞ (September 1995); included #∞ issues of Ultraforce, All New Exiles, Prime, Mantra, Rune, The Night Man, and Siren
- Break-Thru #1–2 (December 1993 – January 1994); crossover mini-series)
- Codename: Firearm #0–5 (June–August 1995)
- Eliminator #0–3 (April–July 1995)
- Elven #0–4 (October 1994 – May 1995)
- Exiles #1–4 (August–November 1993)
- Firearm #1–18 + 0 (September 1993 – February 1995)
- Flood Relief #1 (January 1994)
- Foxfire #1–4 (February–May 1994)
- Freex #1–18 (July 1993 – February 1995)
- Godwheel #0–3 (January–February 1995, crossover mini-series)
- Hardcase #1–26 (June 1993 – August 1995)
- Hostile Takeover (September 1994, ashcan)
- Lord Pumpkin #0 (October 1994, one shot)
- Lord Pumpkin/Necro-Mantra #1–4 (April–July 1995, mini-series)
- Mantra v1 #1–24 (July 1993 – August 1995)
- Mantra v2 #1–7 (October 1995 – April 1996)
- The Night Man #1–23 (October 1993 – August 1995)
- The Night Man #1–4 (October–December 1995)
- Prime v1 #1–26 (June 1993 – August 1995)
- Prime v2 #1–15 (October 1995 – December 1996)
- Prototype #1–18 + 0 (August 1993 – February 1995)
- Rafferty #1 (November 1994, ashcan)
- Ripfire #0 (January 1995, one shot)
- Rune v1 #0–9 (January 1994 – April 1995)
- Rune v2 #1–7 (October 1995 – April 1996)
- Siren #1–3 (October–December 1995)
- Sludge #1–12 (October 1993 – December 1994)
- Solitaire #1–12 (November 1993 – December 1994)
- The Solution #1–17 + 0 (September 1993 – February 1995)
- The Strangers #1–24 (June 1993 – May 1995)
- Ultraforce v1 #1–10 + 0 (August 1994 – July 1995)
- Ultraforce v2 #1–15 (October 1995 – December 1996)
- Ultraverse Premiere #0 (November 1993); continued for #1–11 (March 1994–February 1995) as double-size flip books with ongoing Ultraverse series:
  - Rune #3, Mantra #10, Prime #12, The Strangers #13, Firearm #11, Prototype #13, Hardcase #16, Sludge #12, Freex #15, Solution #16, and Nightman #16
- Ultraverse Double Feature: Prime and Solitaire #1 (January 1995, one-shot)
- Ultraverse: Future Shock #1 (February 1997)
- Ultraverse Origins #1 (January 1994, one-shot)
- Warstrike #1–7 (May–November 1994)
- Witch Hunter #1 (April 1996)
- Wrath #1–9 (January–December 1994)
- Year Zero: The Death of the Squad #1–4 (April–July 1995, mini-series)

==== Crossovers with Marvel Comics (1995–1996) ====
- The All-New Exiles vs. X-Men #0 (October 1995)
- Avengers/Ultraforce #1 (October 1995); published by Marvel between Ultraforce/Avengers Prelude #1 and Ultraforce/Avengers #1
- Battlezones: Dreamteam² #1 (March 1996); collection of Ultraverse/Marvel character art
- Conan vs. Rune #1 (November 1995); published by Marvel Comics, along with Rune appearances in Conan #4 and Conan the Savage #4
- Dream Team #1 (July 1995); collection of Ultraverse/Marvel character art
- The Night Man/Gambit #1–3 (March–May 1996)
- The Night Man vs. Wolverine #0 (August 1995)
- The Phoenix Resurrection (December–March 1996)
- Prime vs. The Incredible Hulk #0 (July 1995)
- Prime/Captain America #1 (March 1996)
- Rune vs. Venom #1 (December 1995)
- Rune/Silver Surfer #1 (April 1995); published in a flip book with the other side reading Silver Surfer/Rune
- Ultraforce/Avengers #1 (October 1995)
  - Ultraforce/Avengers Prelude #1 (July 1995)
- Ultraforce/Spider-Man #1A, #1B (January 1996)

=== Adventure Comics (1990–1993) ===
- Alien Nation:
  - Alien Nation: The Spartans #1–4 (1990)
  - Alien Nation: A Breed Apart #1–4 (November 1990 – March 1991)
  - Alien Nation: The Skin Trade #1–4 (March–June 1991)
  - Alien Nation: The Firstcomers #1–4 (May–August 1991)
  - Alien Nation: The Public Enemy #1–4 (December 1991 – March 1992)
  - Alien Nation: The Lost Episode #1 (1992)
- Ape Nation #1–4 (February–June 1991, a crossover featuring elements from Alien Nation and Planet of the Apes)
- Demon's Tails #1–4 (January–April 1993)
- Dracula: The Suicide Club #1–4 (August–November 1992, original sequel to the Bram Stoker novel Dracula and the Robert Louis Stevenson series The Suicide Club)
- H. P. Lovecraft #1–4 (adaptations of The Lurking Fear, Beyond the Wall of Sleep, The Tomb, and The Alchemist)
- Logan's Run #1–6 (June 1990 – April 1991, based on the 1967 novel of the same title)
- Logan's World #1–6 (May 1991 – March 1992, based on the 1977 novel of the same title)
- Miss Fury – In Full Color! #1–4 (November 1991 – February 1992)
- Paranoia #1–6 (November 1991 – August 1992, based on the role-playing game of the same title)
- Planet of the Apes:
  - Planet of the Apes #1–24 (April 1990 – July 1992)
  - Ape City #1–4 (August–November 1990)
  - Planet of the Apes Annual #1 (1991)
  - Planet of the Apes: Urchak's Folly #1–4 (January–April 1991)
  - Terror on the Planet of the Apes #1–4 (June–December 1991, reprint of the Marvel Comics storyline)
  - Planet of the Apes: Blood of the Apes #1–4 (November 1991 – February 1991)
  - Planet of the Apes: Sins of the Father #1 (March 1992)
  - Planet of the Apes: The Forbidden Zone #1–4 (December 1992 – March 1993)
- Re-Animator #1–3 (adaptation of 1985 film of the same name)
- Rocket Ranger #1–5 (September 1991 – July 1992, based on the Cinemaware computer game)
- Strange Sports Stories #1-3 (May 1992 - August 1992)

=== Aircel Comics (1986–1992) ===
- Bodyguard #1–3 (September–November 1990, reprint of Australian title with new material)
- Carmilla #1–6 (February–July 1991)
- Casanova #1–10 (March–December 1991)
- The Cat #1–2 (November–December 1991)
- Cat & Mouse #1–18 (March 1990 – September 1991)
- Flesh Gordon #1–4 (March–July 1992, based on the 1974 film of the same title)
- Full Throttle #1–2 (October–November 1991, reprint of Australian titles Rip Snorter and Raw Tonnage with new material)
- Galaxina #1–4 (December 1991 – March 1992, based on the 1980 film of the same title)
- The Men in Black:
  - The Men in Black #1–3 (January–March 1990)
  - The Men in Black Book II #1–3 (May–July 1991)
- Samurai #1–23 (January 1986 – October 1987)
- Samurai (volume 2) #1–3 (December 1987 – February 1988)
- Samurai (volume 3) #1–7 (July 1988 – January 1989)
- Scum of the Earth #1–3 (August–October 1991, based on the 1963 film of the same title)
- Silver Storm #1–4 (May–August 1990)
- The Southern Squadron #1–4 (August–November 1990, reprint of Australian superhero title with new material)
- Team Nippon #1–7 (June–December 1989)
- Vampyre's Kiss #1–4 (1990)

=== Eternity Comics (1988–1993) ===
- Captain Harlock #1–13 (October 1989 – December 1990)
- Cat Claw #1–9 (September 1990 – October 1991)
- Charlie Chan #1–6 (March–August 1989)
- Cosmic Heroes #1–11 (October 1988–1989)
- Demonic Toys #1–4 (January–August 1992, based on the film series of the same title)
- Dinosaurs for Hire (volume 1) #1–9 (March 1988 – January 1990)
- Dollman #1–2 (1991–1992, based on the 1991 film of the same title)
- Dracula #1–4 (December 1989 – March 1990, adaptation of the Bram Stoker novel Dracula)
- Dracula: The Lady in the Tomb #1 (January 1991, adaptation of the Bram Stoker short story Dracula's Guest)
- Galactic Patrol Lensman #1–5 (July 1990 – November 1990)
- Ghosts of Dracula #1–5 (September 1991 – January 1992)
- Invaders from Mars #1–3 (March–May 1990, adaptation of the 1953 film of the same name)
- The Mantus Files #1–4 (August–November 1991)
- Ninja High School by Ben Dunn (1988–1993) – title inherited from (and then taken back by) Antarctic Press
- Plan 9 from Outer Space: Thirty Years Later! #1–3 (January–March 1991)
- Puppet Master:
  - Puppet Master – In Full Color! #1–4 (November 1990 – May 1991)
  - Puppet Master: Children of the Puppet Master #1–2 (August–September 1991)
- Robotech
- Scimidar #1–4 (June–September 1988)
- The Southern Squadron: The Freedom of Information Act #1–4 (January–April 1991, reprint of Australian superhero title with new material)
- Street Heroes 2005 #1–3 (January–March 1989)
- Subspecies #1–4 (May–August 1991, based on the 1991 film of the same title)
- Trancers: The Adventures of Jack Deth #1–2 (August–September 1991, based on the Trancers film series)
- White Devil #1–6 (June–November 1990)

==== Shattered Earth (1986–1990) ====
- Ex-Mutants (volume 1) #1–8 (1986–1987)
- Ex-Mutants: The Shattered Earth Chronicles #1–15 (April 1988 – February 1990)
- The New Humans #1–15 (December 1987 – August 1989)
- Shattered Earth #1–9 (November 1988 – August 1989)
- Solo Ex-Mutants #1–6 (January 1988 – January 1989)
- Wild Knights #1–10 (March 1988 – June 1989)

==== Shuriken spin-offs (1987–1991) ====
- Blade of Shuriken #1–5 (May 1987 – January 1988)
- Hellbender #1 (January 1990)
- Shuriken (volume 2) #1–6 (June–November 1991)
- Shuriken Team-Up #1 (January 1988)
- Shuriken: Cold Steel #1–6 (July–December 1989)

=== Bravura (1994–1995) ===
- Bravura #0 (January 1995)
- Breed #1–6 (January–June 1994); by Jim Starlin
- Breed II #1–6 (1994–1995); by Jim Starlin, continued at Image Comics
- Dreadstar #1–6 (November 1994– April 1995); by Jim Starlin
- Edge (1994–1995), #1–3 (June 1994–April 1995); by Steven Grant and Gil Kane; unfinished, with the completed series released by iBooks as hardback collection in 2004 under the title The Last Heroes
- The Man Called A-X #0–5 (November 1994–April 1995); by Marv Wolfman, continued at DC Comics
- Metaphysique #1–6 (April–October 1995); by Norm Breyfogle, continued from Eclipse Comics
- Nocturnals #1–6 (January–August 1995); by Dan Brereton; continued at Dark Horse
- Power & Glory #1–4 + Holiday Special (February–December 1994); by Howard Chaykin
- Star Slammers #1–4 (1994–1995); by Walter Simonson— unfinished, with issue #5 published by Dark Horse Comics as Star Slammers Special in 1996)
- Strikeback! #1–3 (1994); by Jonathan Peterson, Kevin Maguire, and Steve Oliff—unfinished, with issues #4-5 published by Image Comics in 1996

=== Rock-It Comix (1993–1994) ===
- Black Sabbath #1 (February 1994)
- Lita Ford #1 (December 1993)
- Metallica #1 (December 1993)
- Ozzy Osbourne #1 (December 1993)
- Pantera #1 (August 1994)
- Santana #1 (May 1994)
- World Domination #1 (December 1993)

=== Other titles ===
- Bones #1–4 (August–November 1987)
- Bruce Lee #1–6 (July–December 1994)
- Comics That Ate My Brain! (1991)
- D-Alpha #1 (1990); by Barry Blair
- Dark Wolf #1–4 (July–October 1987)
- The Gauntlet (1992); collects Peter Hsu's Aircel series
- Libby Ellis #1–4 (July–October 1987)
- I Love Lucy: A Comic Retrospective (1990)
- The Mighty Magnor (April 1993–April 1994); by Sergio Aragonés
- Mortal Kombat:
  - Mortal Kombat #1–6 + 0 (July–December 1994); #1–6 are cover titled Mortal Kombat: Blood & Thunder
  - Mortal Kombat: Goro, Prince of Pain #1–3 (September–November 1994)
  - Mortal Kombat: Tournament Edition #1 (December 1994)
  - Mortal Kombat: U.S. Special Forces #1–2 (January–February 1995)
  - Mortal Kombat: Battlewave #1–6 (February–July 1995)
  - Mortal Kombat: Rayden and Kano #1–3 (March–May 1995)
  - Mortal Kombat: Baraka #1 (June 1995)
  - Mortal Kombat: Kung Lao #1 (July 1995)
  - Mortal Kombat: Kitana and Mileena #1 (August 1995)
  - Mortal Kombat: Tournament Edition II #1 (August 1995)
- Murder City (1990)
- Plan 9 from Outer Space (1990)
- Project A-ko #1–4 (March–June 1994)
- Quadrant (1990); collects Peter Hsu's eight-issue indie series
- Raver #1–3 (April–June 1993, created by Star Trek actor Walter Koenig)
- The Rovers #1–5 (September 1987 – January 1988); continued at Eternity
- Star Blazers #0–11 (March 1995 – May 1997); Argo Press, from Comico
- Star Trek:
  - Star Trek: Deep Space Nine #1–32 + 2 Annuals + 4 Specials (August 1993 – January 1996)
  - Star Trek: Deep Space Nine Hearts and Minds #1–4 (June–September 1994)
  - Star Trek: Deep Space Nine, The Maquis #1–3 (February–April 1995)
  - Star Trek: Deep Space Nine, The Celebrity Series #1–2 (August–September 1995)
  - Star Trek: Deep Space Nine/The Next Generation #1–2 (October 1994 – December 1995), co-published with DC Comics (#1 & #4 list DC as the indicia publisher)
- Street Fighter #1–3 (September–November 1993)
- The Best of Street Fighter #1–3 (July–September 1994)
- Stealth Force #1–8 (July 1987–April 1988)
- Tarzan:
  - Tarzan the Warrior #1–5 (March–August 1992)
  - Tarzan: Love, Lies, and the Lost City #1–3 (August–October 1992)
  - Tarzan the Beckoning #1–7 (November 1992 – June 1993)
- Terminator 2: Judgment Day:
  - Terminator 2: Judgment Day: Cybernetic Dawn #1–4 (November 1995 – February 1996)
  - Terminator 2: Judgment Day: Nuclear Twilight #1–4 (November 1995 – February 1996)
  - Terminator 2: Judgment Day: Nuclear Twilight/Cybernetic Dawn #0 (April 1996)
