= Centaur Publications =

American comic book publisher

- Founded: 1938; 88 years ago
- Founder: Joe Hardie; Fred Gardner; Raymond Kelly
- Defunct: 1942; 84 years ago
- Country of origin: United States
- Headquarters location: New York City
- Key people: Bill Everett
- Publication types: Comic books

Centaur Publications (also known as Centaur Comics) was one of the earliest American comic book publishers. During their short existence, they created several colorful characters, including Bill Everett's Amazing-Man.

== History ==
=== Comics Magazine Company ===
Centaur developed primarily from the Comics Magazine Company, Inc. In 1936, comic-book entrepreneur Everett M. "Busy" Arnold gave financial or other unspecified help to that New York City-based firm, founded by John Mahon and Bill Cook, former employees of Major Malcolm Wheeler-Nicholson's National Allied Publications (the primary forerunner of DC Comics). The duo published the premiere issue of The Comics Magazine (May 1936), using inventory content from National Allied's submissions. One collector/historian suggests this was in lieu of pay.

Among the Comics Magazine Company's original features was Dr. Mystic the Occult Detective (not to be confused with Mr. Mystic of newspapers' "The Spirit Section"). This two-page feature was by future Superman creators Jerry Siegel and Joe Shuster, and was part of their Doctor Occult continuity, with the name changed for trademark consideration. This was the beginning of a serial that introduced the villain Koth, and the Seven, that continued into DC's More Fun Comics #14–17 (issues also designated as vol. 2 #2–5).

The company's flagship title, the eponymous Comics Magazine, premiered with a May 1936 cover date. That comic book series featured the first masked hero in American comics, writer-artist George Brenner's the Clock, in the November 1936 issue.

=== Ultem Publications ===
Another entrepreneur, Harry "A" Chesler, published Star Comics and Star Ranger through his own Chesler Publications, each with first issues cover-dated February 1937. These titles were soon bought out by I. W. Ullman and Frank Z. Temerson's Ultem Publications. In September 1937, Ultem acquired the Comics Magazine Company's titles, retaining Chesler as the packager for both his own previous titles and the two that were continued from the Comics Magazine Co. Financial difficulties forced Ultem to sell some of its properties, including the Clock, to "Busy" Arnold's Quality Comics.

=== Centaur Comics ===
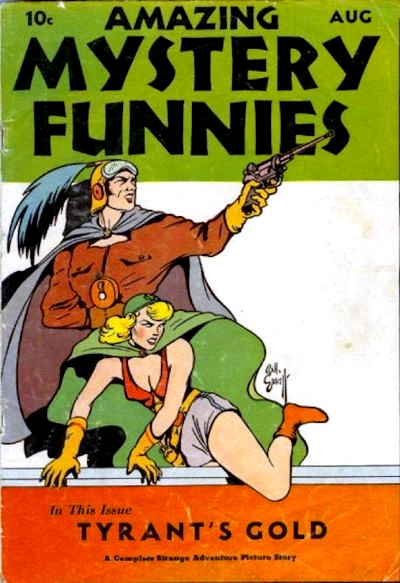
Amazing Mystery Funnies No. 1 (1938), art by Bill Everett

By January 1938, Ultem was bought out by Joe Hardie, Fred Gardner, and Raymond Kelly's Centaur Publications, Inc., which had been publishing pulp magazines since at least 1933. Hardie, Gardner, and Kelly used this base to create Centaur Comics, which began publishing in March 1938. They also drew on the back inventory of stories to fill out the early issues of their new titles with reprints. Centaur Publications, Inc. ceased production at the end of 1940, but continued to produce comics under the name Comic Corporation of America.

Centaur ceased publication four years later, primarily due to poor distribution, but in that period had created several colorful characters, including Bill Everett's Amazing Man. Everett would later go on to comics fame by introducing Namor the Submariner to Timely (later Atlas Comics, then Marvel Comics). Everett's first nationally published comic work was the cover of Amazing Mystery Funnies No. 1 (1938).

=== Revival ===
In 1992, Malibu Comics revived several Centaur heroes—which by that time had lapsed into public domain—as the superhero team The Protectors. Malibu selected R. A. Jones to revamp and write the series. Included were Airman, Amazing Man, the Arrow, the Clock (as a retired mystery man, then the President of the United States, Brian O'Brien), the Fantom of the Fair, also known as Fantoman (renamed by Malibu as Gravestone), the Ferret, Man of War, the Masked Marvel (renamed Night Mask), Mighty Man, Prince Zardi the Eternal Man, and the Shark (renamed Thresher), as well as completely original characters, such as Arc and Aura. Several of these characters had short-lived titles of their own. AC Comics reprinted a number of stories featuring Centaur characters in their anthologies.

R. A. Jones was approached by a small book publisher, Westerntainment, to do a prose novel about the Centaur characters with the idea that the story takes place in their original time period. By December 2014, his novel The Steel Ring was available. A second book, Twilight War, was green-lit by that time. Those Centaur heroes in Ring were Amazing Man, the Clock, Ferret, Iron Skull, Man of War and others. In October 2016, Twilight War was available. Centaur characters for the second novel included Airman, the Arrow, Eternal Man and Phantom Princess. Each novel takes place in a different year of World War II. At the time of the second novel's release, Jones had planned to do a total of seven books in the series for each year of the war.

== Characters ==
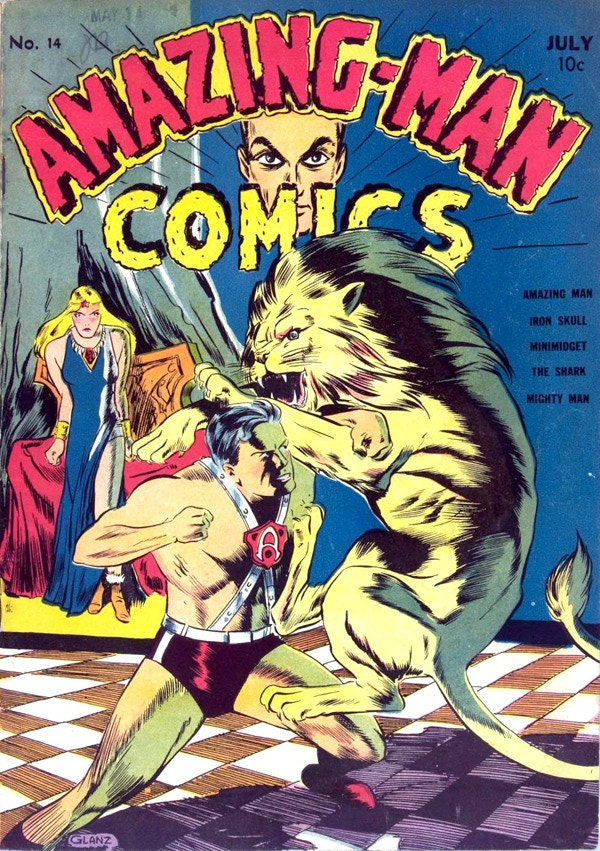
Cover of Amazing-Man Comics No. 14 (July 1940), art by Lew Glanzman

- Airman
- Amazing-Man
- The Arrow
- Black Panther
- Blue Fire
- Blue Lady
- The Buzzard
- Catman
- Chuck Hardy
- The Conqueror (enemy of Dean Denton)
- The Clock (at the Comics Magazine Co., character sold to Quality Comics but reprints of CMC stories appeared at Centaur)
- Dan Hastings
- Dash Dartwell
- Dean Denton
- Diana Deane
- Dirk the demon
- Dr. Darkness
- Dr. Hypno
- Dr. Mystic
- Dr. Synthe
- The Electric Ray
- The Eye
- Ermine
- Eternal man
- Fantom of the Fair/Fantoman
- The Ferret
- The Fire Man
- Iron Skull
- King of Darkness
- Liberty Guards
- Mad Ming
- Magician from Mars
- Man O'War
- Marksman
- The Masked Marvel
- Meteor Martin
- Mighty-Man
- Minimidget
- Miraco the Great
- Nightshade
- The Rainbow
- The Sentinel
- The Shark
- Scarlet Ace
- Skyrocket Steele
- Solarman
- Speed Centaur
- Super-Ann (two characters of the same name)
- T.N.T
- TNT Todd
- Vapo-man
- The Voice
- The Witch (Migthy Man villain)
