= Comics packaging =

Comics publishing activity

Comics packaging is a publishing activity in which a publishing company outsources the myriad tasks involved in putting together a comic book — writing, illustrating, editing, and even printing — to an outside service called a packager. Once the comics packager has produced the comic, they then sell it to the final publishing company.

In this arrangement, the comics-packaging company acts as a liaison between a publishing company and the writers, artists, and editors that design and produce the comic book. Comics packagers thus blend the roles of agent, editor, and publisher (as distinct from syndicates, which perform a similar function in the comic strip industry).

Comics packagers, often operated by notable artists such as Will Eisner and Jack Binder, formed in the 1930s to supply cheaply produced material to the burgeoning American comics industry. Some comics publishers used packaging services in the 1970s, 1980s, and 1990s as well. Comics packagers and art studios also played role in the British comics industry. Although not as prevalent as it once was, comics packaging still forms a segment of the modern comics industry.

== Business model ==
There are two main reasons for utilizing a comics packager: a publisher new to the comics industry that does not have an in-house staff or access to a network of freelancers; or a business outside the comics industry that decides to produce comics for advertising or informational purposes. In these latter cases, the comic is first conceived as a marketing concept, and the packager is then hired to write and produce the comic on a work for hire basis. Some packagers only provide art for the comics, with the writing done by in-house talent.

Eisner & Iger, one of the first packagers, had 15 writers, artists and letterers on staff, according to co-founder Will Eisner: "They were working for me full-time, on salary. I tried to avoid dealing with freelancers on a per-page basis." At the same time, Eisner & Iger charged publishers $5 to $7 per finished page.

Historically, comics packagers (such as the Chesler shop, the Sangor Studio, and Eisner & Iger) were set up as physical studios. As explained by comics historian Hames Ware, however, Lloyd Jacquet's Funnies Inc. "was distinct from the other major shops. It was set up more like a clearinghouse than a conventional shop. While at the other classic shops, there were actually buildings and offices housing... many artists who often collaborated on jobs, most of Jacquet's artists worked from home and did solo work."

== Remuneration and credit ==
While the comics-packaging sector is little-known outside the publishing world, it provides employment to many freelance authors and illustrators. Most packagers pay a flat project or page rate. Packagers do not pay royalties, which means that even if a package-produced comic becomes a bestseller, the creators do not receive additional payment.

Artist Joe Kubert recalled Harry "A" Chesler paying him $5 a week, at age 12 (c. 1938) to apprentice at his studio after school. Similarly, artist Carmine Infantino remembers that, c. 1940, he was paid by Chesler "a dollar a day, just [to] study art, learn, and grow. That was damn nice of him, I thought. He did that for me for a whole summer" while Infantino was in high school. Joe Simon said that his Funnies Inc. rate for a completed comic-book page — written, drawn, and lettered — was $7. For comparison, he recalled that at Eisner & Iger — where Eisner wrote the features and created characters, hiring novice artists — the page rate was approximately $3.50 to $5.50. George Tuska, who worked for a number of packagers in the late 1930s, notes that he made $10 a week with Eisner & Iger, and then, with the Chesler shop, $22 a week, increased to $42 a week within six months.

In the early days of comics, creators working for comics packagers worked anonymously as ghostwriters and "ghost artists", under the packaging company name, or under an alias. (It's worth noting, however, that most comics stories produced during this period didn't contain credits, making individual attribution difficult.) In some cases, a creator's work would be credited to someone else's name, such as a celebrity, who was paid to be listed as the credited writer as a way of increasing sales. Historian Hames notes, however, that at Funnies Inc., most artists "got credit for whatever job they did. (Jacquet also allowed writer credits from time to time)."

== History ==
=== Golden Age of Comic Books ===
The first packagers to emerge were in the late 1930s, supplying comics features and complete comic books to publishers testing the waters of the emerging medium. As early packager Will Eisner noted at this time, around 1936,

[T]the only comic books being started were all reprinting daily newspaper comic strips... and it suddenly hit me, out of the blue, that they would run out of a supply of these strips very soon, and then there'll be an opportunity to sell original material, drawn especially for these comic books. So... I told Jerry Iger about this idea and said I'd like to form a company with him and we'd produce the original art for these comic books.

The most prominent packagers during this period were Harry "A" Chesler, Eisner & Iger, Funnies Inc., and the Sangor Studio, all based in New York City, like the publishers they served. Packagers provided early work to such notable artists and writers as Will Eisner, Jack Kirby, Joe Simon, Jack Cole, Jack Binder, Otto Binder, Charles Biro, Mort Meskin, George Tuska, Nina Albright, Toni Blum, and many others.

Packagers were responsible for the creation of a number of notable comics titles and characters. Funnies Inc., for example, founded by Lloyd Jacquet, supplied the entire contents of Marvel Comics #1 (cover-dated Oct. 1939), the first publication of what would become the multimedia corporation Marvel Comics — not to mention featuring the debuts of such legacy characters as the Sub-Mariner, the Human Torch, and the Angel. Funnies Inc. employee Joe Simon is also credited with creating Blue Bolt (for Novelty Press). While with Eisner & Iger, Eisner is credited with co-creating such characters as Doll Man and Blackhawk for Quality Comics, and Wonder Man and The Flame for Fox Publications. Eisner & Iger also created Sheena, Queen of the Jungle.

By the late 1930s, the packaging business was flourishing. Chesler, who also acted as a publisher, recalled in a 1976 profile, "besides about 75 of my own titles, we produced comics for some 50 different publishers. At one time, there were 40 artists working for me and I had 300 comic titles on the newsstands." (Note: David Saunders, without citation of the original source, quotes Chesler saying, "At one time, there were forty artists working for me." The Grand Comics Database, however, records only 19 distinct titles directly published by Chesler between 1937 and 1946, leaving the meaning of "my own titles" in this quote unclear.)

As the comics industry took hold, alumni of the packagers "went on to form the nuclei of various comics art staffs" for a number of different early comics companies. They also started their own studios; in the years 1942–1945, a number of artists became packagers in their own right, including L. B. Cole, Jack Binder, Bernard Baily, Mac Raboy, and Vincent Fago.

When superhero comics went out of fashion in the postwar era, Sheldon Moldoff became an early pioneer in horror comics, packaging two such ready-to-print titles — This Magazine Is Haunted and Worlds of Fear — eventually bought by Fawcett Publications in 1951–1952.

Most of the early crop of packagers petered out by the mid-1950s as the remaining publishers produced their comics in-house.

=== Modern era ===
With the advent of the 1970s, a number of new packagers arose, most of whom provided comics art but not stories to their clients. These included Continuity Associates and Selecciones Ilustradas.

Continuity Associates (later known as Continuity Studios), was formed by cartoonists Neal Adams and Dick Giordano in 1971. At first, Continuity primarily supplied motion picture storyboards and advertising art, but it soon became an art packager for comic book publishers, including such companies as Charlton Comics, Marvel Comics, DC Comics, the one-shot Big Apple Comix, and even Adams' own Continuity Comics. Continuity served as the launching pad for the careers of a number of professional comics artists. (When doing collective comics work, the artists were often credited as "Crusty Bunkers.") More established cartoonists like Win Mortimer found work at Continuity profitable enough that they left the comics industry to work exclusively on Continuity projects.

Selecciones Ilustradas, a Spanish art agency, provided artists for the horror comics magazine publishers Warren Publishing and Skywald Publications in the period 1971–1983, providing an entrée into the U.S. comics market for a great number of these Spanish artists.

From the mid-1970s to the mid-2000s, Byron Preiss (as Byron Preiss Visual Publications) packaged graphic novels, comics, illustrated books, and children's books to various publishers using the talents of comics artists such as Howard Chaykin, Dennis Francis, Marc Hempel, Gray Morrow, Alex Niño, Ralph Reese, Tom Sutton, and Mark Wheatley.

David Campiti, with Campiti and Associates (c. 1985–1988) and then Glass House Graphics (1993–present), operated more like a traditional comics packager, supplying complete comics to such publishers as Eternity Comics, Continuity Comics, DC Comics, Eclipse Comics, NOW Comics, and his own Innovation Publishing. Campiti and Associates was active in comics packaging during the "black-and-white boom" of the mid-1980s. Independent publishers whose work was produced almost exclusively by Campiti and Associates include:

- Sirius Comics (1985–1986)
- Pied Piper Comics (1986–1988)
- Eternity Comics (1986–1988)
- Imperial Comics (1986–1987)
- Amazing (1986–1987)
- Wonder Color (1987)

Glass House Graphics played a major role in the entrée of Brazilian artists such as Ed Benes, Joe Bennett, Mike Deodato, and Luke Ross into the American comics market.

=== The U.K. comics market ===
Starting in the 1950s, the British comics market often used art packagers — often artists from Spain, from such studios as A.L.L.I. and Bardon Arts.

== Notable comics packagers ==
=== Golden Age of Comic Books ===
- Chesler Studio (Harry "A" Chesler), c. 1935–c. 1953 (Note: Marv Wolfman, a former Marvel Comics editor-in-chief, said that as late as from c. 1971 to 1975 the Chesler studio produced material for the Marvel Comics line of black-and-white magazines. (Chesler died in 1981.))

Clients: MLJ Magazines Inc. (Zip Comics, Pep Comics, Top-Notch Comics), Fawcett Comics (Captain Marvel, Master Comics), Quality Comics (Feature Funnies), Centaur Comics (various features)
Notable creators: Jack Binder, Otto Binder Charles Biro, Jack Cole, Otto Eppers, Ken Ernst, Creig Flessel, Bob McCay, Mort Meskin, Ruben Moreira, Mac Raboy, Syd Shores, Charles Sultan, George Tuska, Carmine Infantino (intern), Joe Kubert (intern)
Notes: Also operated as a publisher. Supposedly also provided material for Marvel Magazines in the 1970s.

- Eisner and Iger Studio / a.k.a. Syndicated Features Corporation (Will Eisner and Jerry Iger) c. 1936–1939;
  S. M. Iger Studio (Jerry Iger, and from 1945, Ruth Roche), 1940–1961

Clients: Editors Press Service (Wags), Fiction House (many titles), Fox Feature Syndicate (Wonder Comics #1, Wonderworld Comics #4), Quality Comics (Feature Funnies)
Notable creators: Ruth Atkinson, Alex Blum, Toni Blum, Nick Cardy, Reed Crandall, Jules Feiffer, Lou Fine, Frank Giacoia, Bob Kane, Jack Kirby, Klaus Nordling, Bob Powell, Mike Sekowsky, Charles Sultan, George Tuska, Chic Stone (intern)
Notes: Created Sheena, Queen of the Jungle. Eisner credited with co-creating characters including Doll Man (Quality Comics), Blackhawk (Quality), Wonder Man (Fox Feature Syndicate), and The Flame (Fox) during this time. Eisner & Iger also sold color comic strips to newspapers.

- Funnies Inc./Lloyd Jacquet Studios (Lloyd Jacquet), 1939–c. 1958

Clients: Marvel Comics (Marvel Comics #1), Centaur Publications, Fox Feature Syndicate, Hillman Periodicals, Novelty Press
Notable creators: Carl Burgos, Paul Gustavson, Joe Simon, Mickey Spillane, Leonard Starr, Basil Wolverton
Notes: Created Human Torch, Sub-Mariner, Angel, Blue Bolt, Spacehawk

- Sangor Studio (Benjamin W. Sangor), 1939–1948

Clients: Standard Comics (also Better Comics, Nedor Comics), National Comics Publications
Notable creators: John Celardo, Dan Gordon, Graham Ingels, Jack Katz, Bob Oskner, Art Saaf

- L. B. Cole Studio (L. B. Cole), 1942–1948

Clients: Ace Magazines, Aviation Press, Chesler Publications, Farrell Publications, Fawcett Comics, Holyoke Publishing, Magazine Enterprises, Spotlight Comics, Novelty Press, Orbit Publications, Rural Home Publishing
Notable creators: Nina Albright
Notes: Seems to have hired staff only in 1944–1945

- Jack Binder Studio (Jack Binder), 1942–1946

Clients: Fawcett Comics, Nedor Comics, Lev Gleason Publications features (Fighting Yank, Mister Scarlet and Pinky, Bulletman, Ibis the Invincible, Captain Battle, the Black Owl, Doc Savage, The Shadow)
Notable creators: Ken Bald, Carmine Infantino, Gil Kane, Kurt Schaffenberger, Bill Ward

- Bernard Baily Studio (Bernard Baily and Mac Raboy), 1943–1946

Clients: Cambridge House Publishers (Star Studded Comics, Gold Medal Comics), Croyden (Rural Home Publishing imprint), Jay Burtis, Narrative, Lindsay Baird, Quality Comics (Feature Comics), Neal Publications, Novack '45 (Spotlight Comics imprint), R. B. Leffingwell, Holyoke Publications
Notable creators: Nina Albright, Dan Barry, Dick Briefer, Frank Frazetta, John Giunta, Carmine Infantino, Gil Kane

- Fago Studios (Vincent Fago), 1945–1951

Clients: Charlton Comics
Notable creators: Al Fago

=== Modern era ===
- Continuity Associates (Neal Adams and Dick Giordano), 1971–c. 2022

Client: Charlton Comics, Marvel Comics, Atlas/Seaboard Comics, DC Comics, Continuity Comics, Big Apple Comix one-shot
Notable creators: Terry Austin, Liz Berube, Pat Broderick, Howard Chaykin, Dennis Francis, Larry Hama, Bob Layton, Val Mayerik, Bob McLeod, Al Milgrom, Win Mortimer, Michael Netzer, Carl Potts, Joe Rubinstein, Walt Simonson, Jim Starlin, Greg Theakston, Bob Wiacek
Notes: For comics, generally provided art, not writing or editing; when doing collective comics work, the artists were often credited as "Crusty Bunkers". Also supplied motion picture storyboards, advertising art, animatics, 3D computer graphics, and conceptual design.

- Selecciones Ilustradas (Josep Toutain), 1971–1983

Clients: Warren Publishing, Skywald Publications
Notable creators: Vicente Alcazar, Rafael Aura León, Alfonso Azpiri, José Beá, Luis Bermejo, Jordi Bernet, Jesús Blasco, Daniel Branca, Jaime Brocal Remohí, Emilia Castañeda Martínez, Fernando Fernández, Alfons Figueras, Alfonso Font, Víctor de la Fuente, Luis García Mozos, Carlos Giménez, Juan Giménez, Jorge Longarón, Esteban Maroto, Félix Mas, Isidro Monés, José Ortiz, Carlos Pino, Leopold Sánchez, Manuel Sanjulián, Vicente Segrelles, Manfred Sommer, Ramon Torrents
Notes: Spanish agency; artwork only

- Vincent Fago, 1973–1980

Clients: Pendulum Press (Pendulum Illustrated Classics)
Notable creators: Otto Binder, Kin Platt, Irwin Shapiro, E. R. Cruz, Rudy Nebres, Alex Niño, Nestor Redondo, Gerry Talaoc, Vicatan
Notes: Artists mostly from the Philippines

- Byron Preiss Visual Publications (Byron Preiss), 1974–c. 2005

Clients: Pyramid Books, Ace Books, Bantam Books, DC Comics
Notable creators: Howard Chaykin, Dennis Francis, Marc Hempel, Gray Morrow, Alex Niño, John Jude Palencar, Ralph Reese, Tom Sutton, Mark Wheatley

- Campiti and Associates (David Campiti), c. 1985–1988;
  TriCorp Entertainment (Brian Marshall and David Campiti), 1986

Clients: Sirius Comics, Pied Piper Comics, Eternity Comics, Imperial Comics, Amazing, Wonder Color
Notable creators: Mark Beachum, Rick Bryant, Bo Hampton, Kelley Jones, David Lawrence, Tom Lyle, Alan Oldham, John Statema

- Acme Comics (Richard Ashford, Bambos Georgiou, Richard Hansom, Cefn Ridout), 1992–1995

Clients: Dark Horse Comics (James Bond, Lux & Alby Sign on and Save the Universe)
Notable creators: Simon Jowett, John M. Burns, David Lloyd, Don McGregor, Martin Millar, Simon Fraser
Notes: Based in the U.K.

- Glass House Graphics (David Campiti), 1993–c. present

Clients: Comic Shop News (Mack Bolan: The Executioner), Comico (Zamindar feature in Esc.), Continuity Comics (Hybrids, Ms. Mystic, Samuree), DC Comics (Darkstars, The Prisoner), Disney (Beauty and the Beast), Eclipse Comics (Dean Koontz's Trapped, Miracleman), Innovation Publishing (Dark Shadows, Interview with the Vampire, Lost in Space, Lucifer's Hammer, On a Pale Horse, Quantum Leap, The Queen of the Damned), Mad International, NOW Comics (Green Hornet, Kato of the Green Hornet, Speed Racer, Syphons)
Notable creators: Ed Benes, Joe Bennett, Mort Castle, Mike Deodato, Dærick Gröss Sr., David Lawrence, Luke Ross, Matt Thompson

=== Packagers in the U.K. comics market ===
- A.L.I. (late 1950s)

Clients: Amalgamated Press, Odhams Press
Notable creators: Luis Bermejo
Notes: Artists only. Based in Spain

- Bardon Arts (1960s)

Clients: Fleetway Publications (Tell Me Why, Once Upon a Time, Look and Learn, Tiny Tots)
Notable creators: Luis Bermejo, José Ortiz
Notes: Artists only. Based in Valencia, Spain

- Martspress (Leonard Matthews), 1968–c. 1974

Clients: City Magazines (TV21)
Notable creators: Alf Wallace, Jim Baikie, Mike Noble, Carlos Pino, Vicente Alcazar

== See also ==
- Book packaging
