= David Campiti =

American writer in the comics/animation industries

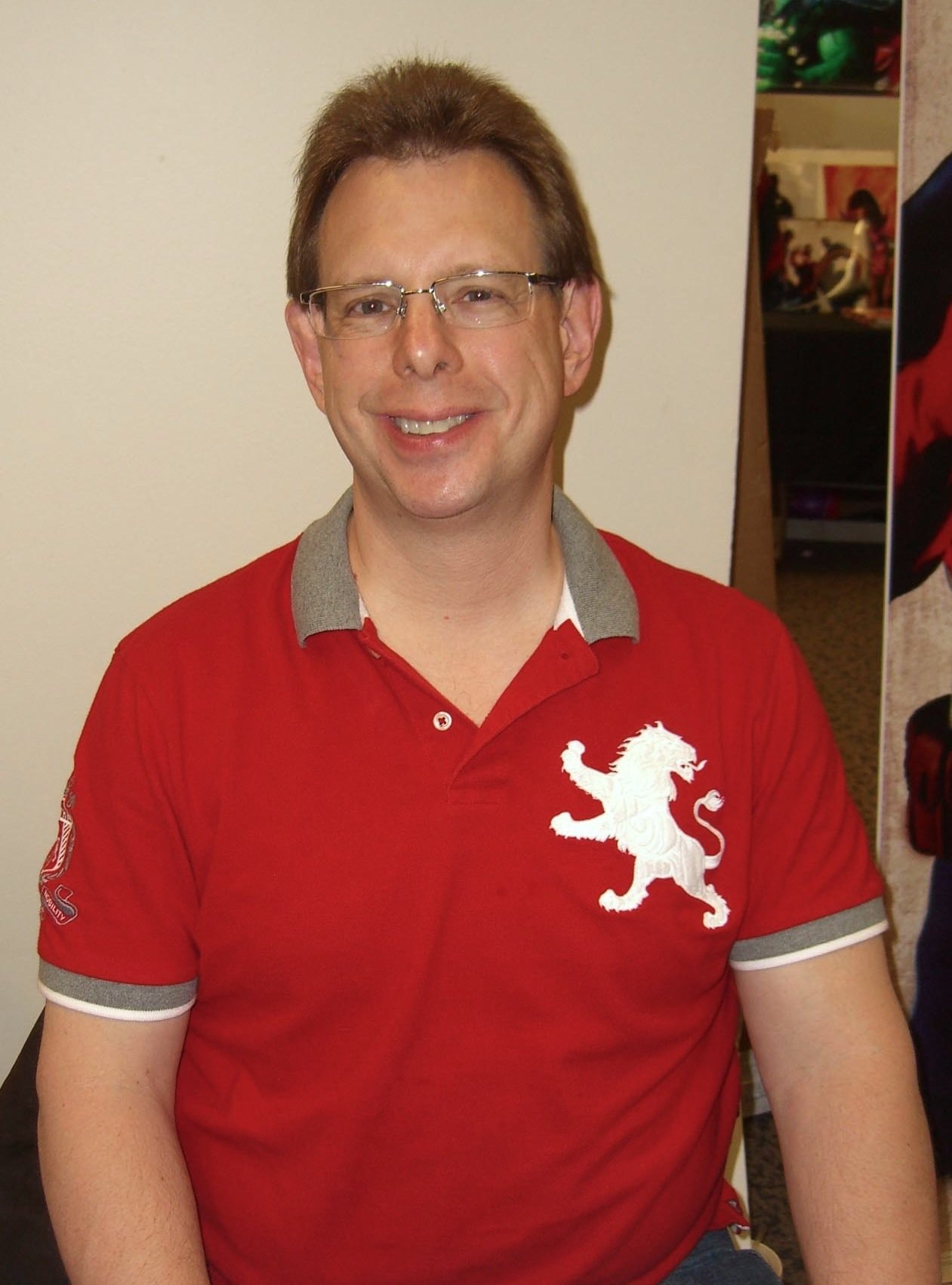
- Campiti at the Big Apple Convention, May 21, 2011
- Born: May 9, 1958 (age 68) Wheeling, West Virginia, U.S.
- Areas: Writer, Editor, Publisher
- Notable works: Campiti and Associates; Innovation Publishing; Glass House Graphics / Glass House Studios
- Spouses: Cynthia "Cynthy" Wood; Meryl Campiti

David Campiti (/kæmˈpiːti/; born May 9, 1958) is an American animation producer, comic book writer, talent agent, and packager. He was deeply involved with a number of comics publishers in the late 1980s and early 1990s, including Eternity Comics, Pied Piper Comics, and his own entity, Innovation Publishing. As CEO of Glass House Graphics, Campiti oversees an international animation studio and agency of illustrators, writers, painters, and digital designers.

== Early life ==
Campiti is the adopted son of Charles H. and Rose Campiti. He graduated from Warwood High School and West Liberty University. He began writing as a child.

== Career ==
Campiti sold his first writing to the Wheeling News-Register while still in college, and to such magazines as Writer's Digest and Comics Buyer's Guide soon after.

He was an on-air news reporter at WKWK radio, where he also wrote, performed, and produced humorous radio commercials. He soon moved on to WANJ-FM Radio.

In 1982, Campiti moved from his hometown of Wheeling, West Virginia, to North Attleboro, Massachusetts, where he worked as chief copywriter at the L.G. Balfour Company and, later on, as a writer for the United Way of New England.

Campiti sold comic book scripts to Pacific Comics in 1982. In 1985, Campiti wrote a short story for Action Comics #573 at DC Comics, then turned to freelance editing and comics packaging full-time.

=== Campiti and Associates ===
Campiti's packager, Campiti and Associates (also known as Creative Concepts) supplied content for a number of small publishers launched during the so-called "black-and-white boom" of the mid-1980s, employing creators like Mark Beachum, Rick Bryant, Ron Lim, and David Lawrence.

Campiti first provided content for the short-lived publisher Sirius Comics (1985–1986), where he spearheaded the creation of the superhero team Hero Alliance. Early in 1986, Campiti and writer-editor Brian Marshall co-founded the comics packager TriCorp Entertainment. With private financing from Sunrise Distribution's Scott Mitchell Rosenberg, Marshall and Tony Eng formed Eternity Comics; Campiti packaged material for Eternity to publish, including Lawrence & Lim's Ex-Mutants.

=== Pied Piper / Amazing / Wonder Color ===
Beginning in the summer of 1986, after disputes arose between Marshall and Campiti, Rosenberg and some investors provided capital for Campiti to form two new small publishers: Amazing and Wonder Color. Meanwhile, Campiti, Mark L. Hamlin, and Roger McKenzie formed Pied Piper Comics, with Hamlin, McKenzie, and Campiti sharing the title of Publisher and Campiti also holding the title of Editor-in-Chief. Campiti personally edited most of Pied Piper's comics as well as writing a number of titles. The plan was that Campiti would package comics for all three publishers through Campiti and Associates, with Pied Piper handling "special projects such as posters and graphic novels; black-and-white [comics] were Amazing's domain, and Wonder Color would product strictly color comics."

In the spring of 1987, Rosenberg revealed his involvement with the various small publishers he was financing. The resulting fallout led to the consolidation of the various Rosenberg properties, with Amazing and Wonder Color both being shut down and a few of their titles moving to Pied Piper.

=== Innovation Publishing ===
Pied Piper collapsed in 1988, but Campiti wrote a business proposal that helped raise $400,000 to finance the launch of his own venture, Innovation Publishing. Innovation brought literary, film, and TV tie-in series and adaptations, such as Anne Rice's The Vampire Lestat, Dark Shadows, Quantum Leap, and Lost in Space. Innovation also continued a number of titles from Pied Piper/Amazing/Wonder Color, including Hero Alliance and Power Factor. Under Campiti's leadership, Innovation was one of the first companies to delve heavily into recruiting talents from Brazil, starting the American careers of Mike Deodato and Joe Bennett. According to Campiti, Innovation became number four in market share, below Marvel Comics, DC Comics, and Dark Horse Comics.

=== Glass House Graphics ===
In 1993, Campiti resigned from Innovation and founded Glass House Graphics, a new comics packager. Campiti gave comics workshops at conventions and art schools in Brazil and the Philippines, cementing further relationships with Brazilian comics artist, including Al Rio. One of Glass House's clients was the short-lived publisher Topps Comics.

In 1995, Campiti briefly served as art director of Pop Comics, a publisher of unauthorized comic book biographies.

In 1997, Campiti and Glass House Graphics packaged material for the short-lived publisher Amazing Comics Group, founded by Howard Feltman. Amazing Comics released three crossover titles in 1997 (most of it using talent Campiti recruited in Brazil), all of which told the story of the "Jewels of the Rising Sun." The company was based in Shepherd, Michigan, and had a publishing agreement with Gary Reed of Caliber Comics.

In the early 2020s Campiti/Glass House Graphics produced graphic novel adaptations for two middle-grade series for Simon & Schuster: The Goddess Girls and Heroes in Training.

Campiti holds the position of CEO/Manager — USA & South America at Glass House Graphics. The company has offices in the U.S., Brazil, Manila, Jakarta, and various locations in Europe, coordinating a roster of worldwide talents that produce art, stories, and digital graphics for a range of publishers and studios.

=== Red Giant Entertainment ===
From March 2013 to 2018, Campiti served on the board of directors and as COO of Red Giant Entertainment, a comic book publisher and "transmedia" entertainment company.

Campiti was listed as producer and character actor for Journey to Magika, the first animated film from Red Giant Entertainment, which aired on Hulu in 2014. His Glass House Studios animation animated The Grubbs, a TV pilot for Keenspot Entertainment.

=== Other works ===
Campiti's credits as writer include Action Comics #573, Exposure and Jade Warriors for Image Comics and Keenspot. Most of his work in comics was as an editor on titles like T.H.U.N.D.E.R. Agents, Magnus, Robot Fighter, Beauty and the Beast, Dark Shadows, and Hero Alliance.

He was a "contributing writer" to Stan Lee's How to Draw Comics, released in November 2010 by Watson-Guptill/Dynamite Entertainment.

== Bibliography ==
=== Amazing Comics ===
- Angel Heat (1997)
- Dangerous Secrets (Amazing Comics, 1997)
- The Experimentals (Amazing Comics, 1997)

=== Angel Entertainment ===
- Dream Angel (1996)

=== Avatar Pres ===
- Exposure Second Coming (2000)
- Exposure Special 2001 (2001)
- Jade Warriors: Slave of the Dragon (2001)

=== DC Comics ===
- (with co-writer Kevin Juaire and artists Alex Saviuk & Eduardo Barreto) "If I Were Superman...", in Action Comics #573 (Nov. 1985)

=== Dynamite Entertainment / Watson-Guptill ===
- (as contributing writer) Stan Lee's How to Draw Comics (Nov. 2010)

=== Image Comics ===
- (with artist Al Rio) Exposure (1999–2000)
- (with co-writer Mike Buckley and artist Mike Deodato) Jade Warriors (1999)

=== Innovation Publishing ===
- 3×3 Eyes (1991)
- Beauty and the Beast (1993)
- Forbidden Planet (1992–1993)
- Mike Baron's The Group Larue (1989)
- Hero Alliance Annual (1990)
- Hero Alliance Manual
- Hero Alliance Quarterly (1991–1992)
- Hero Alliance Special (1992)
- Legends of the Stargazers (1989–1990)
- Lost in Space (1991–1993)
- Piers Anthony's On a Pale Horse (1991)
- Quantum Leap (1991–1993)
- The Vampire Companion (1990–1992)

=== Pacific Comics ===
- (stories in anthology title) Vanguard Illustrated #1–3 (1983–1984)
- (with co-writer and artist David Ross) "Avalone Episode One: Survival," in Vanity #2 (1984)

=== Sirius Comics ===
- Greylore #1–5 (1985–1986)

=== Other publishers ===
- Galaxy Girl
- Oscarzinho (Brazilian comics)
- Terra One
- T.H.U.N.D.E.R. Agents
