= Dave Olbrich =

American comic book editor

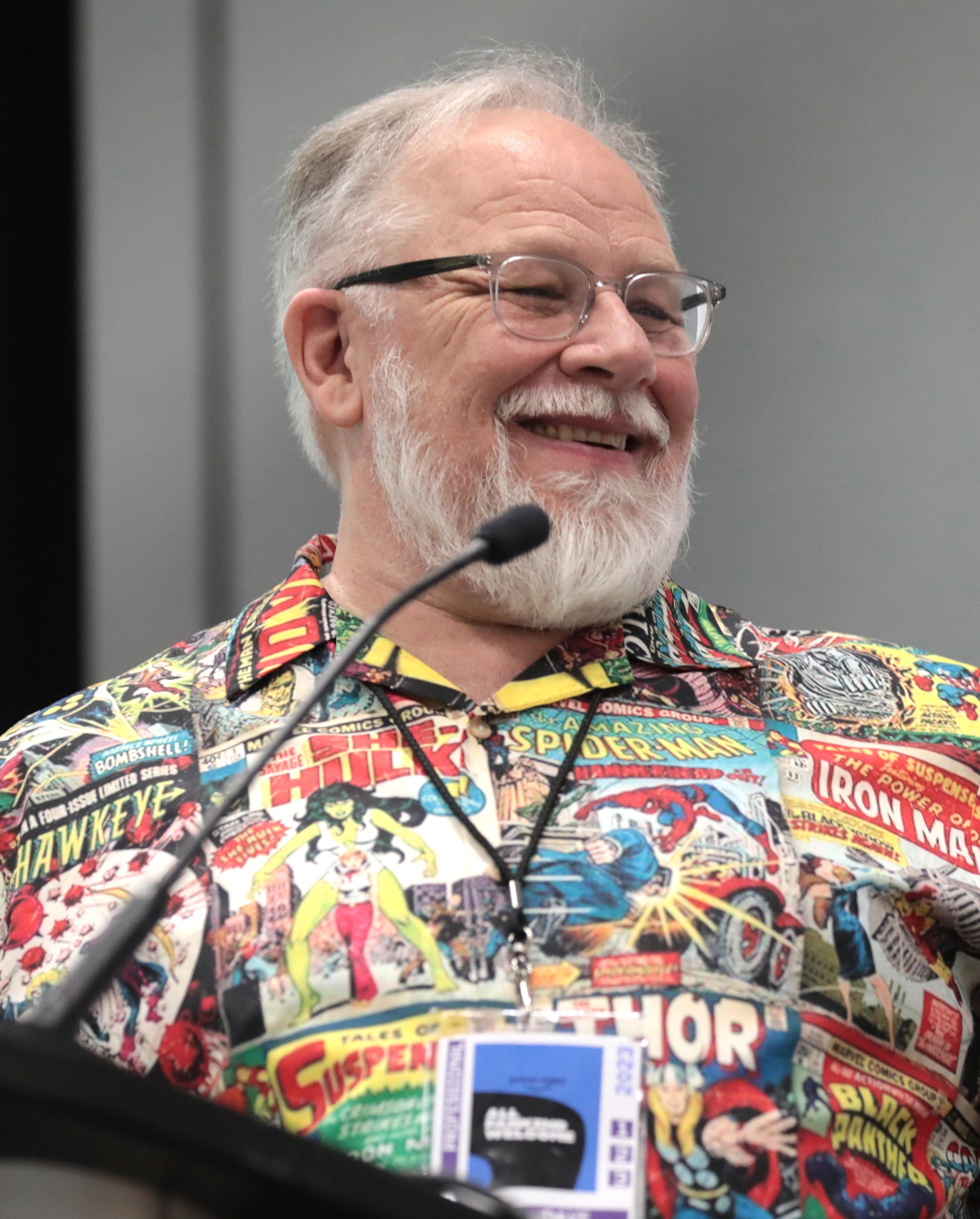
- Olbrich at the 2023 WonderCon
- Born: David W. Olbrich c. 1960 (age 65–66) Elgin, Illinois, U.S.
- Area: Publisher
- Notable works: Kirby Award; Eisner Award; Malibu Comics; Ultraverse

Dave Olbrich is an editor and executive in the American comic book industry. He was instrumental in the creation of two awards for achievement in comic books, voted on by professionals, the Kirby Awards and the Eisner Awards. He was a co-founder and publisher of Malibu Comics. While at Malibu, he helped launch Image Comics.

Currently, he works for San Diego Comic Convention as the Marketing and Publications Editor, as well as producing a YouTube channel about comics and comic-related issues, Geekview Tavern, which began releasing episodes in 2020.

== Early life ==
Olbrich grew up on a farm in Dodge County, Minnesota, part of a large family. He attended Claremont High School in Claremont, Minnesota, graduating in 1978. He attended the University of Wisconsin–La Crosse, where he graduated in 1982 with a Bachelor of Science in Mass Communications.

== Kirby and Eisner Awards ==
By 1984 Olbrich had moved to Connecticut, where he found work with the publisher Fantagraphics, among his duties being promotion manager of the company's news magazine The Comics Journal. The Kirby Award was created in reaction against the 1983 institution of the Comics Buyer's Guide Fan Awards, which were voted on by fans; Olbrich (and the editors at Fantagraphics) wished to create an award voted on by comics professionals (meaning creators, retailers, and distribution personnel).

Olbrich came up with the idea of naming the new award after the pioneering writer and artist Jack Kirby, and managed the process. By this time Fantagraphics had moved to Thousand Oaks, California, and Olbrich was managing editor of the company's trade publication Amazing Heroes. Olbrich and his fellow editors and warehouse employees made the first Kirby Award nominations, with the final ballots printed in issues of Amazing Heroes (which sponsored the award).

The Jack Kirby Comics Industry Awards were first distributed at the 1985 San Diego Comic-Con, with Kirby himself on hand to congratulate the winners. The Kirby was the first such award voted on by professionals since the Shazam Awards ceased in 1975.

The awards lasted for three years, but in 1987 a dispute arose after Olbrich had left the magazine (to help found Malibu Comics); he and Fantagraphics each claimed ownership of the awards, eventually leading to the discontinuation of the Kirby Award.

A compromise was reached, and in 1988 two new awards were created: the Eisner Award, managed by Olbrich and named after Will Eisner; and the Fantagraphics-managed Harvey Award, named for Harvey Kurtzman. Both of the new awards allowed voting only by comics industry professionals.

As administrator of the Will Eisner Comic Industry Award, Olbrich started the award's non-profit organization. The first Eisner Awards were distributed in 1988 at San Diego Comic-Con, with Will Eisner himself on hand to congratulate the winners.

There was no Eisner Award ceremony, or awards distributed, in 1990, due to widespread balloting mix-ups. Olbrich left the administrator position, and was replaced by Jackie Estrada, who has been the award administrator ever since.

== Malibu Comics and Image Comics ==
Malibu Comics was launched in late 1986 by Olbrich and Tom Mason, with the financing of Scott Mitchell Rosenberg, at that time the operator of Sunrise Distribution. Olbrich, who already worked for Sunrise, took the position of Malibu's publisher and editor-in-chief.

Malibu began modestly with creator-owned black-and-white titles, but made a name for itself publishing a combination of new series and licensed properties such as the classic characters Tarzan and Sherlock Holmes, and popular TV, movie and video game tie-ins. At Malibu, Olbrich created the marketing plan for the Ultraverse imprint.

By the early 1990s, Malibu had established itself as a small but dependable company sympathetic to creator-ownership. During that time, star creators Erik Larsen, Rob Liefeld, and Jim Valentino had dinner with Olbrich, who expressed interest in publishing comics created by them. These and several other freelance artists doing popular work for Marvel Comics were growing frustrated with the company's work for hire policies and practices, which they felt did not sufficiently reward the talent that produced them; at the time the company heavily merchandised their artwork but compensated them with modest royalties.

By early 1992 a group of eight creators, including Larsen, Liefeld, and Valentino, announced the founding of Image Comics; the initial titles were produced under the Image imprint, but published through Malibu, which provided administrative, production, distribution, and marketing support.

Within a few months, the Image titles' success led to Malibu having almost 10% of the North American comics market share, briefly exceeding that of industry giant DC Comics. By the beginning of 1993, Image's financial situation was secure enough to publish its titles independently, and it left Malibu.

As sales declined industry-wide in the mid-1990s, Malibu canceled lower-selling series. Nonetheless, the company's assets were still seen as attractive enough to garner interest from DC Comics in the spring of 1994, and the company was purchased by Marvel Comics on November 3, 1994. In the middle of the next year, Olbrich, along with fellow Malibu standard-bearers Mason and Chris Ulm, left the company.

== Post-Malibu ==
After leaving Malibu/Marvel, Olbrich worked for the video gaming magazine GameFan. He was the director of U.S. publishing for Les Humanoïdes Associés from 2000 to 2002.

At the turn of the 21st century he helped developed the creator-owned imprints Bravura and Gorilla Comics.

He operated the Dogg Works Agency (with Gary Guzzo) from 2002 to 2005, at which point he left to co-found The Pack, a packager at which he partnered with Brian Augustyn, Barbara Kesel, Lee Nordling, and Gordon Kent. The Pack developed new non-fiction properties and licensed properties for production as graphic novel projects. The Pack disbanded in late 2011.

In 2009, Olbrich was an executive at Space Goat Productions, a talent management and production studio that provides art and creative services for companies like Marvel, DC, and Dark Horse. In 2015, as Space Goat moved into publishing comics under its own name, Olbrich was promoted from Vice President to Senior VP, Publishing and Business Affairs. Olbrich departed Space Goat in 2016.

Olbrich created, produces and hosts a pop culture oriented YouTube Channel called Geekview Tavern, which began in 2020.

In February 2025, Olbrich accepted the position of Marketing and Publications Editor at San Diego Comic Convention, a non-profit that oversees conventions focusing on comics and the popular arts, primarily WonderCon and San Diego Comic-Con.

== Personal life ==
Olbrich is married, with a daughter named Maggie.
