= Al Rio =

Brazilian comic book artist (1962–2012)

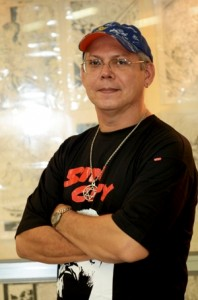
- Al Rio
- Born: Álvaro Araújo Lourenço do Rio; 19 May 1962 Fortaleza, Ceará, Brazil
- Died: 31 January 2012 (aged 49) Fortaleza, Ceará, Brazil
- Area: Artist

Álvaro Araújo Lourenço do Rio (19 May 1962 – 31 January 2012) – known professionally as Al Rio – was a Brazilian comic book artist, best known for his "good girl" illustration work, particularly on the American comic book series Gen^{13} and DV8, published by Wildstorm Comics.

== Early life ==
Al Rio was born in Fortaleza, Ceará, in northeastern Brazil.

== Career ==
Rio began his professional art career in Rio de Janeiro in the early 1990s, illustrating books for a local English school. After then working as animation director for the same company, Rio became an animator for The Walt Disney Company, working on such properties as the syndicated Aladdin animated series. In the early 1990s he joined the art agency Glass House Graphics.

Known primarily for his comic book work, he drew for Wildstorm Comics — particularly on Gen^{13} and DV8, for which he is best known — Marvel Comics, DC Comics, Dark Horse Comics, Chaos Comics, Image Comics, Zenescope Entertainment, Malibu Comics, Crossgen, Vertigo, and Amazing Comics. Titles he worked on include Dungeon Siege, Grimm Fairy Tales, Avengelyne, Voodoo, Grifter and the Mask, Secret Files, WildC.A.T.S., X-Men Unlimited, Captain America, Star Wars - A New Hope, Purgatori, Titan A.E., Exposure, Knockout, Mystic, Peter Parker - Spider-Man, Spider-Man, Threshold, and Ana - Jungle Girl. He was especially known for his "good girl art".

== Personal life and death ==
Rio died January 31, 2012. According to his art agency (Glass House Graphics, which Rio joined in the mid-1990s), the apparent cause was suicide by hanging. His funeral was held at Cemitério São João Batista in Fortaleza, Ceará, Brazil. He was survived by his wife, Zilda, and three children: Renan, Andrielle and Isabelly.

== Legacy ==
In July 2013, it was announced that producer Kevin VanHook was developing a television series based on Exposure, the Red Giant Entertainment comic book series that Rio created with agent David Campiti.
