= Amazing Heroes =

Magazine about the comic book medium

- Amazing Heroes #85 (December 15, 1985). Cover art by Alan Davis.
- Editor: Michael Catron (founding editor); Kim Thompson (1981–1992)
- Categories: Comics criticism and news
- Frequency: Varied between monthly and biweekly
- Publisher: Fantagraphics Books
- First issue: June 1981
- Final issue Number: July 1992; 204 (plus a number of special issues and annuals)
- Country: United States
- Based in: Stamford, Connecticut (1981–1984); Greater Los Angeles, California (1984–1989); Seattle, Washington (1989–1992)
- Language: English
- ISSN: 0745-6506

Amazing Heroes was a magazine about the comic book medium published by American company Fantagraphics Books from 1981 to 1992. Unlike its companion title, The Comics Journal, Amazing Heroes was a hobbyist magazine rather than an analytical journal.

== Publication history ==
Fantagraphics decided to publish Amazing Heroes as another income stream to supplement The Comics Journal. As long-time Fantagraphics co-publisher Kim Thompson put it: "If you want to look at it cynically, we set out to steal The Comic Reader's cheese. Which we did."

Amazing Heroes' first editor was Fantagraphics' head of promotion and circulation, Michael Catron. His inability to meet deadlines led to his being replaced after issue #6 by Comics Journal editor Kim Thompson.

The magazine was initially published under the Fantagraphics imprint Zam Inc., through issue #6. Beginning with #7, the publishing imprint became Redbeard Inc. It remained under Redbeard through at least issue #61, but by issue #68 was being published directly by Fantagraphics Books, Inc.

The magazine began as a monthly, then appeared twice a month for many years, and then went monthly again beginning in 1989. The magazine ran for 204 issues, folding with its July 1992 issue. The final issue was released as a flip book, with issue #203 on the front and issue #204 inverted on the back. It also released a number of special issues, such as Amazing Heroes Preview Special #1–5, 10, & 11 (1985–1990), Amazing Heroes Swimsuit Special #1–5 (1990–1993), and The Best of Amazing Heroes Swimsuit Special (1993).

In February 1993, Fantagraphics announced that the publisher Personality Comics had bought the rights to Amazing Heroes, and planned to revive the magazine. Nothing came of it, however, as Personality itself folded later that year, and by 1994 the rights had reverted back to Fantagraphics.

== Format and content ==
Amazing Heroes' first 13 issues were magazine-sized, while the rest were comic book-sized.

The regular content included industry news, comics creator interviews, histories of comic book characters and reviews. Features included Hero Histories of various characters/features, previews of upcoming series, and letters page. Other regular features were a column called "Doc's Bookshelf" by Dwight Decker (which ran from 1987–1989), and a question-and-answer feature called "Information Center", which ran from 1986–1989.

There were regular special editions presenting previews of all comics slated to appear over the next six months, with Amazing Heroes Preview Special appearing twice a year, beginning with the Summer 1985 issue #1. These were extra-sized issues (often square-bound), and many issues also contained joke entries. The editors fluctuated between publishing these as separately numbered specials and special issues of the regular series itself, with issues #133, 145, 157, and 170 of the regular series (released in 1988 and 1989) taking the place of specials six through nine.

The Amazing Heroes Swimsuit Special, featuring pin-ups of characters in bikinis and similar beach apparel by various artists, debuted with a June 1990 edition. It was preceded by annual swimsuit issues of Amazing Heroes: #115 (April 1987), #138 (April 1988), and #164 (May 1989).

Amazing Heroes #200 (Apr. 1992) contained an extended preview of Scott McCloud's Understanding Comics; the issue was later awarded a Don Thompson Award for Best Non-Fiction Work.

== The Jack Kirby Award ==
From 1985 to 1987, the magazine presented The Jack Kirby Award for achievement in comic books, voted on by comic-book professionals and managed by Amazing Heroes managing editor Dave Olbrich. After a dispute in 1987 over who owned them, the Kirby Awards were discontinued. Starting in 1988, two new awards were created: the Eisner Award, managed by Olbrich, and the Fantagraphics-managed Harvey Award.

== Awards ==
Amazing Heroes won the U.K.'s Eagle Award for Favourite Specialist Comics Publication four years in a row, from 1985 to 1988:

- 1985: Eagle Award — Favourite Speciality Comics Publication
- 1986: Eagle Award — Favourite Specialist Comics Publication
- 1987: Eagle Award — Favourite Specialist Comics Publication
- 1988: Eagle Award — Favourite Specialist Comics Publication
- 1992: Compuserve Comics and Animation Forum Award — Best Non-Fiction Work

== See also ==
- The Comic Reader
