= Wabbit Wampage =

Board game

Wabbit Wampage is a 1985 board game published by Pacesetter Ltd.

== Gameplay ==
Wabbit Wampage is a game in which the players are titular Wabbits who war against both a farmer and each other to control the carrot crop and farm buildings, and the chance to cause mayhem.

== Reception ==
Craig Sheeley reviewed Wabbit Wampage in Space Gamer No. 76. Sheeley commented that "Wabbit Wampage is not worth [the price]. It's a cute idea, and the mail-order shtick is worthy of TOON, but that's all. Furthermore, Wabbit Wampage isn't in the same class as Star Ace or Chill, and doesn't belong on the same shelves. It belongs in the same category as Monopoly, Risk, and Candyland."

Charles Vasey reviewed Wabbit Wampage for White Dwarf #72, giving it an overall rating of 6 out of 10, and stated that "I may even say it is better researched and more redolent of its subject than are most wargames or RPGs. This is the Bushido of wampaging wabbitdom. It's also rather tedious in play with lots of inconclusive dice-rolling."

Wabbit Wampage won the Charles S. Roberts Award for Best Fantasy or Science Fiction Game of 1985.

== Reviews ==
- 1985 Games 100

== In other media ==
In 1987, Stephen D. Sullivan of Pacesetter Ltd. wrote and drew a Wabbit Wampage humor comic for the publisher Amazing.
