= Sirius Comics =

Defunct comic book publisher

- Founded: 1985
- Founders: Jose Collado; Juan Collado; Leopaldo Collado
- Defunct: 1986
- Country of origin: United States
- Headquarters location: Queens, New York
- Key people: David Campiti
- Publication types: Comics
- Fiction genres: Fantasy, science fiction, humor
- Imprints: New Sirius Productions; Prelude Graphics

Sirius Comics, also known as New Sirius Productions and Prelude Graphics, was a small comic book publisher based in Queens, New York, that operated from 1985 to 1986. Owned and operated by brothers Juan Collado (Editor-in-Chief), Leopaldo Collado (President), and Jose Collado (Operating Director), the company specialized in fantasy comics and science fiction comics.

The company started out based in Long Island City and later moved to Woodside.

Much of the material published by the company was packaged by David Campiti's Creative Concepts via Campiti & Associates. Notable creators connected with Sirius/New Sirius/Prelude Graphics include Campiti, Mark Beachum, Rick Bryant, Bo Hampton, Mark Martin, Bill Oakley, and Roger McKenzie.

Sirius published a house organ called Sirius Comics Solicitations (also called Sirius Solicitations and Sirius Comics/Prelude Graphics Solicitations) that ran at least nine issues through June 1986.

Juan Collado later went on to become president of Dynamite Entertainment.

== Titles published ==
=== Sirius Comics ===
- Against Blackshard: 3-D - The Saga of Sketch, the Royal Artist (1 issue, 1986)
- Greylore (5 issues, Dec 1985–Aug 1986)
- Hero Alliance (2 issues, 1985–1986) — collected and published as the "graphic novel" Hero Alliance: The End of the Golden Age by Pied Piper Comics, another publisher affiliated with David Campiti
- Shifter
- Tales of the Sun Runners (2 issues, Jul 1986–Sep 1986) — title continues with Amazing
- Terraformers — ended up being published by Wonder Color, another publisher affiliated with David Campiti

=== New Sirius Productions ===
- Gnatrat: The Dark Gnat Returns (1 issue, 1986) — Mark Martin's parody of Frank Miller's The Dark Knight Returns
- The Survivors (2 issues, Oct 1986–Nov 1986)

=== Prelude Graphics ===
- Alternate Heroes (1 issue, Dec 1986)
