= Battlestar Galactica (comics) =

Comics

Battlestar Galactica has been adapted to the comic book format since its inception, with six publishers to date taking on the project of relating the story of the Colonial Fleet and their adversaries, the Cylons, at different points.

== Original continuity adaptations ==
Battlestar Galactica #1 (1979) from Marvel Comics

=== Marvel Comics ===
The comic book Battlestar Galactica, based on the ABC television series of the same name, was published monthly by Marvel Comics from March 1979 through January 1981, and lasted 23 issues.

Although Roger McKenzie was most often the writer, and Walt Simonson the most regular artist, the book also had a high rotation of guest writers and artists, see table below.

Marvel Comics began its adaptation of Battlestar Galactica with Marvel Super Special #8, a magazine format comic written by Roger McKenzie and drawn by Ernie Colón which was released as a tie-in to the start of the series. Based on an early script of the three hour series premiere "Saga of a Star World", this adaptation was also released in a tabloid format and then later as a paperback as well. The tabloid version was also printed by Whitman Comics. Its success led Marvel to print a regular monthly comic.

When the regular run of Marvel's Battlestar Galactica comic book began some months later, the Super Special adaptation was expanded by several pages, and provided the material for the first three issues of the comic.

The direct adaptation of the series continued in issues #4 and #5 which chronicled the adventures depicted in the two part television episode, "Lost Planet of the Gods". Roger McKenzie continued as scripter, with Walter Simonson now providing the art.

By issue #6 the TV adaptations ceased, and Marvel's team began to create new stories about the characters of the Battlestar Galactica universe, picking up from where issue #5 left off. From this point, both in terms of story content and the narrative arc, Marvel's Battlestar Galactica deviates from the televised adventures. Marvel's contract with Universal Studios specifically did not allow them to use anything from the television series that followed "Lost Planet of the Gods". This adaption more closely followed the novelization of the two-hour movie, Saga of a Star World, than the ABC television series.

Although the run of the Battlestar Galactica comic coincided with the broadcast of the short-lived Galactica sequel series, Galactica 1980 on ABC, the newer program was never referred to in the pages of the comic, apart from the letters page.

Notably, the writers of the Galactica comic were quite willing to remove key characters from the dramatic mix for periods of time. From issues #6 to #12, Commander Adama is placed within a machine to help him remember the ancient writings he briefly saw on Kobol and, although we do spend some time in his dreams, he is effectively removed from commanding the Galactica for several issues.

Another character who leaves the series for a while is Starbuck. In this plotline, the fleet comes across Scavenger World, and the female space pirate Eurayle, who makes a deal to spare the Colonials if Starbuck remains with her. Starbuck does so, and the fleet moves on without him, setting up his return in issues #19 and #20.

Unlike both television series, the Galactica comic had a planned ending, with a series of plot devices being wound up in the final two part story of issues #22 and #23. In the course of solving a mystery, Lieutenant Jolly finds adventure and romance and helps in figuring out the long sought coordinates for Earth. This adventure drawn and scripted by Walt Simonson provided a natural conclusion for the storyline.

Marvel Comics issues
Issue	Title	Writer	Penciller	Cover	Notes
#1	Battlestar Galactica	Roger McKenzie	Ernie Colon	Dave Cockrum, Bob McLeod	adapts episode 1
#2	Exodus	Roger McKenzie	Ernie Colon		adapts episode 2
#3	Death Trap	Roger McKenzie	Ernie Colon	Rudy Nebres	adapts episode 3
#4	The Lost Gods of Kobol	Roger McKenzie	Walt Simonson	Walt Simonson, Klaus Janson	adapts episode 4
#5	The Lost Gods of Kobol: Part Two - A Death in the Family	Roger McKenzie	Walt Simonson	Walt Simonson, Klaus Janson	adapts episode 5
#6	The Memory Machine	Roger McKenzie	Rich Buckler	Rich Buckler, Klaus Janson	Beginning of Memory Machine story arc (lasts through Issue #12)
#7	All Things Past and Present	Roger McKenzie	Rich Buckler	Klaus Janson	
#8	Shuttle-Diplomacy	Bill Mantlo	Sal Buscema	Rich Buckler, Klaus Janson	Flashback story
#9	Space-Mimic	Bill Mantlo	Sal Buscema, Klaus Janson	Pat Broderick, Terry Austin	
#10	This Planet Hungers	Tom DeFalco	Pat Broderick	Pat Broderick	Flashback story
#11	Scavenge World	Roger McKenzie, Walt Simonson	Walt Simonson	Walt Simonson, Klaus Janson	Scavenge World story arc/ Departure of Starbuck
#12	The Trap	Roger McKenzie	Walt Simonson	Walt Simonson	Scavenge World story arc/ Departure of Starbuck
#13	Collision Course	Roger McKenzie, Walt Simonson	Walt Simonson	Walt Simonson	Scavenge World story arc/ Departure of Starbuck
#14	Trial and Error	Roger McKenzie	Jim Mooney	Walt Simonson	
#15	Derelict	Walt Simonson, Roger McKenzie	Walt Simonson, Klaus Janson	Walt Simonson	Flashback story
#16	Berserker	Bob Layton, Roger McKenzie	Walt Simonson	Walt Simonson	
#17	Ape and Essence	Walt Simonson, Steven Grant	Walt Simonson	Klaus Janson	Two-issue story arc
#18	Forbidden Fruit	Walt Simonson, Steven Grant	Sal Buscema, Klaus Janson	Michael Golden	Two-issue story arc
#19	The Daring Escape of the Space Cowboy	Walt Simonson	Walt Simonson	Walt Simonson	Return of Starbuck
#20	Hell Hath No Fury	Walt Simonson	Walt Simonson	Walt Simonson	Return of Starbuck
#21	A World For the Killing	Steven Grant, Walt Simonson	Brent Anderson	Brent Anderson, Klaus Janson	
#22	Black is the Color of My True Love's Hair	Walt Simonson	Walt Simonson	Walt Simonson	Series-ending story arc
#23	The Last Hiding Place	Walt Simonson	Walt Simonson	Walt Simonson	Series-ending story arc

==== Reprints and compilations ====
- Marvel Super Special #8: Battlestar Galactica
- Marvel Illustrated Book: BSG, Volume I
- Marvel Illustrated Book: BSG, Volume II
- Star Heroes Pocket Books #1-11
- Star Heroes Winter Special
- Saga of a Star World (Titan Press)
- The Memory Machine (Titan Press)

=== Look-In ===
This children's magazine published a serialized BSG strip from October 20, 1979, to October 11, 1980. The four untitled storylines spanned 52 issues, 13 two-page chapters per storyline, from 1979 #43 to 1980 #42 (the numbering started over again at #1 in January 1980, though the storyline continued to fold as normal). Surprisingly well-rendered and well written, this ongoing Galactica comic has been all but forgotten.

Look-In Magazine—Weekly Serial

- Storyline 1 (issues 1979 #43 to 1979 #52; reset numbering in 1980: 1980 #1 to 1980 #3)
- Storyline 2 (issues 1980 #4 to 1980 #16)
- Storyline 3 (issues 1980 #17 to 1980 #29)
- Storyline 4 (issues 1980 #30 to 1980 #42)

=== Télé-Junior (France) ===
A French-made comic-book series of 28 episodes, based on Battlestar Galactica, was published from 1981 to 1982 in Télé-Junior, a French TV-themed comic magazine similar to Look-In, with art by Gerald Forton. The comic was simultaneously published in Super J, a companion magazine to Télé-Junior.

=== British annuals ===
In addition, Grandreams came out with two Battlestar Galactica hardcover annuals, which contained short text and comic book stories. These comics were aimed primarily at children.

Battlestar Galactica—Hardcover Annual

1. Battlestar Galactica (adapts episode 1 - 3)
2. Chess-Players of Space
3. Bane of Baal Farr
4. Amazons of Space
5. Plus 3 prose stories: Doomsday Rock, Swamp World, Hijack in Space

Mission Galactica: The Cylon Attack—Hardcover Annual

1. Part One: Switch in Space
2. Part Two: Planet of the Cyclops
3. Part Three: Skirmish Beyond Skafrax
4. Part Four: Final Showdown
5. Plus 2 prose stories: Dice with Death/The Enemy Within

=== Maximum Press ===
In July 1995, Maximum Press published a well received mini-series that explained what had happened to our heroes in the intervening years. Ignoring the storyline of the ABC sequel series Galactica 1980, this mini-series followed the crew as they approached Earth, led by Commander Apollo, who had succeeded his father.

The mini-series led to several sequels including "Apollo's Journey", "The Enemy Within", and "Starbuck", all published as three or four issue series in 1995 through early 1996. "Journey's End", the final four issue series, shows the Galactica travelling back through time to the Cylon attack on Caprica. After the Battlestar Galactica Compendium, published in early 1997, Maximum Press announced it would no longer be publishing Galactica based comics.

Miniseries

- The War of Eden #1-4 (also collected in trade paperback format ISBN 1-888610-01-8 in December 1995)
- The Enemy Within #1-3
- Starbuck #1-3
- Apollo's Journey 1-3 (issue #3 was published with 2 alternative covers)
- Journey's End #1-4

Asylum (monthly anthology series)

- Issue 1: Baptism of Fire, Part 1
- Issue 2: Baptism of Fire, Part 2
- Issue 3: Baptism of Fire, Part 3
- Issue 4: Athena's Quest, Part 1 (originally titled Apollo's Quest)
- Issue 5: Athena's Quest, Part 2 (originally titled Apollo's Quest)
- (No BSG story in issue 6)
- Issue 7: Athena's Quest, Part 3 (originally titled Apollo's Quest)
- Issue 8: First Date
- (No BSG story in issue 9)
- Issue 10: The Rebirth of Cy, Part 1 (unfinished)
- (No BSG story in issue 11)

Compilations

- Battlestar Galactica: The Compendium

(Collects Baptism of Fire and The Rebirth of Cy)

- Battlestar Galactica: Special Edition

(Collects Athena's Quest)

=== Realm Press ===
In 1998, Realm Press published their "Battlestar Galactica Search for Sanctuary" single issue special. Other one shots were subsequently published. Later, Realm Press introduced a monthly comic titled "Battlestar Galactica Season 3". This series ran for three issues before it was canceled, and shortly thereafter Realm abandoned the project altogether.

Battlestar Galactica, Season II

Issue 1: The Law of Volahd, Part 1 (2 alternative covers)

Issue 2: The Law of Volahd, Part 2

Issue 3: Prison of Souls, Part 1 (2 alternative covers)

Issue 4: Prison of Souls, Part 2

Issue 5: Prison of Souls, Part 3

Battlestar Galactica, Season III

Issue 1: No Place Like Home (3 alternative covers)

Issue 2: Hades Hath No Fury (4 alternative covers)

Issue 3: Fire in the Sky (3 alternative covers)

Galactica: The New Millennium

- Fear of Flying / Favorite Son / Tales of the Pegasus: Chapter One, Daddy's Girl (3 alternative covers)

Eve of Destruction

- Prelude I: Nostalgie De La Boue / Prelude II: Daughter of Elysium

Search for Sanctuary

- Search for Sanctuary, Part I
- Search for Sanctuary Special Edition

1999 Tourbook

- Dark Genesis (3 alternative covers)

Special Edition

- Centurion Prime (2 alternative covers)

Gallery Special

- The Care and Feeding of Your Daggit / Masquerade

Canceled one-shots

- Colonial Technical Journal, Volume 1
- Dire Prophecy (2 alternative covers)
- Darkest Night (2 alternative covers)
- Battlestar Black and White (2 alternative covers)
- Cylon Dawn (2 alternative covers)
- No-Man's Land (2 alternative covers)
- Minor Difficulties (anthology of short tales)

=== Dynamite Press ===
Dynamite Entertainment, as well as publishing a series based on the new Battlestar Galactica, began publishing Classic Battlestar Galactica based on the original series and set during the early part of the series.

Dynamite has also started another series, Battlestar Galactica: Cylon Apocalypse, that takes place at an undetermined time after the series ended.

In August 2009, Dynamite Entertainment released a Galactica 1980 comic series, written by Marc Guggenheim which was a re-imagining of the original Galactica 1980 series.

In 2012, Dynamite Entertainment announced that a volume two of the Classic Battlestar Galactica would be released. This series started in 2013. In July 2013, Dynamite also announced a mini-series focusing on the character Starbuck.

== Reimagined continuity adaptations ==
"New" Battlestar Galactica #1, published by Dynamite Press, with art by Billy Tan

In May 2006, Dynamite Entertainment announced a new ongoing Battlestar Galactica comic book series based on the reimagining, set between the events of "Home" and "Resurrection Ship".

In addition to the aforementioned ongoing title, other Battlestar Galactica comics have been announced, including a 4-issue series spotlighting Tom Zarek's life, a prequel mini set during the First Cylon War, and a one-shot featuring the Battlestar Pegasus.

In May 2007, Dynamite Entertainment published Battlestar Galactica Season Zero issue #0 as part of Free Comic Book Day. The new series occurs two years before the events in the SciFi TV movie.

Brandon Jerwa has written a four-issue miniseries about the Ghost Squadron, a black-ops team that fly stealthed Vipers, who find them separated from the rest of the fleet after the Cylon attack.

David Reed and Seamus Kevin Fahey (writer of televised episode "Faith" and co-writer of webisode series "The Face of the Enemy") have written an official series about the backstory of the Final Five. The first issue of Battlestar Galactica: The Final Five was released on April 22, 2009. The second issue was released on May 13, 2009. The third issue was released on June 3, 2009. The fourth issue was released on July 1, 2009.

Dynamite Entertainment then continued its publishing of Galactica titles with the release of the Battlestar Galactica: Cylon War and the Battlestar Galactica: The Final Five trade paperbacks in December 2009. In 2013, they resumed publishing of Galactica titles with the Classic Battlestar Galactica Vol. 2 titles and others.

A miniseries has been announced for 2018 which will see the two Galactica series come face-to-face following the discovery of Kali, the last of the reptilian race who created the original Cylons.
