= Brian David-Marshall =

American writer, editor, and publisher in the comic book industry

- Born: Brian Anthony Marshall; 1967 (age 58–59) Brooklyn, New York, U.S.
- Areas: Writer, Editor, Publisher
- Notable works: Eternity Comics; Neutral Ground; InterPop

Brian Anthony David-Marshall, often credited as Brian Marshall (born 1967), is an American comic book and collectible card game industry figure. He has worked in all facets of both industries, from publishing to retail, from writing to editorial. He was a founding partner of Eternity Comics, a comic book publisher active in the late 1980s and early 1990s; and is currently president and publisher of the Web3-based digital entertainment company InterPop. and co-founder of Mothership Games, which is set to release the original IP trading card game Cataclysm Arcade in late 2026.

== Career ==
Marshall got his start in comics publishing in 1985–1986 as an editor with the short-lived company Deluxe Comics/Lodestone Publishing, where he did some writing for the series Codename: Danger and Wally Wood's T.H.U.N.D.E.R. Agents.

In 1986, he and writer-editor David Campiti co-founded the comics packager TriCorp Entertainment. With private financing from comics distributor Scott Mitchell Rosenberg, Marshall and Tony Eng formed Eternity Comics (at that point based in Brooklyn, New York). Campiti packaged material for Eternity Comics to publish. Later in the year, after Marshall and Campiti dissolved their association, Rosenberg created Imperial Comics, installing Marshall as head of the company, while remaining head of Eternity. John Arcudi served as an editor for Imperial Comics.

In the spring of 1987, Rosenberg revealed his involvement with Eternity, Imperial, and three other small comics publishers: Malibu Comics, Amazing, and Wonder Color. The resulting fallout led to the consolidation of the various Rosenberg properties: Imperial was shut down, but Marshall moved to Eternity Comics (at that point a division of Malibu Comics) as Vice President and Publisher. With the move, the Imperial titles Battle to the Death, Nazrat, and Probe all moved over to Eternity Comics.

Marshall's stint at Eternity didn't last long, and by the mid-1990s, he was working as an editor at Billy Tucci's Crusade Comics. It was at this point that he started going by the name "Brian David-Marshall."

Soon after, he became involved in the collectible card game industry. David-Marshall was one of the founders of Gray Matter Conventions, one of the first Magic: The Gathering tournament organizers; and Neutral Ground, formerly the largest gaming location in New York City.

Starting around 2003, David-Marshall became a featured writer for magicthegathering.com, with a weekly column, The Week That Was. He was a commentator on the Pro Tour circuit, and was the historian for Magic: The Gathering. He previously played on the Pro Tour as a member of Team Monkey Dog. In addition, David-Marshall was a tournament organizer for the Upper Deck Entertainment collectible card games Yu-Gi-Oh! Trading Card Game and VS System.

In 2020, David-Marshall and his partners formed InterPop, launching an NFT line of comics where readers could choose the ultimate direction of the stories.

In 2026, as a co-founder of Mothership Games, Marshall would release a Kickstarter for the original IP trading card game Cataclysm Arcade. Over the course of the campaign the Kickstarter raised over $2 million in individual pledges. With an expected release of late 2026, Marshall has confirmed that the team is already looking forward to subsequent set releases.

== Bibliography ==
As writer, unless otherwise noted

- (plot only; with Mike Harris and Robert Loren Fleming) "From the Halls of Montezuma...", Codename: Danger #2 (Lodestone Comics, Oct. 1985)
- (plot only; with Robert Loren Fleming) "I.O.U.", Codename: Danger #3 (Lodestone, Jan. 1986)
- (with David Singer) "Well, I Guess I Am That Kind of Boy!", T.H.U.N.D.E.R. Agents #4 (Deluxe Comics, Feb. 1986)
- Shuriken Team-Up #1 (Eternity Comics, 1988)
- "Heard It Through the Grapevine," Special: The World of Doom #1 (Marvel Comics, May 1995)
- "How to Make Toys the Marvel Way," Fantastic Four: Atlantis Rising Collectors Preview #1 (Marvel, May 1995)
- (story contributions only; with William Tucci [story, script]; Gary Cohn [script]; Jeff Smith [story contributions]) ["Wha--what happened to me...?"], Cyblade: The Battle for Independents #1 (Crusade Comics, Sept. 1995)
- ["You've been staring at me all night."] Manga Shi: Shiseiji #1 (Crusade Comics, Aug. 1996)
- ["We been out here three freakin' hours, man!"], Who Is the Crooked Man #1 (Crusade Comics, Sept. 1996)
- (with Evan Dorkin) "Silence of the Fishes," Bizarro Comics (DC Comics, Aug. 2001)
- (with Igor Kordej) "Relics", Captain America vol. 3, #50: (Marvel, Feb. 2002)
- (with ChrisCross and Brett Weldele) The Craptacular B-Sides #1 (Marvel, Nov. 2002)
