= The Uncensored Mouse =

Unlicensed Disney comics magazine

The Uncensored Mouse is a 1989 comic book series published by Malibu Graphics' Eternity Comics line. The series reprinted Mickey Mouse comic strip stories from 1930, including the first two sequences, "Lost on a Desert Island" and "Mickey Mouse in Death Valley". Only two issues were published. While these early sequences had been reprinted in Italy in the 1970s, The Uncensored Mouse was the first English-language reprint since the strip's newspaper run.

The word "Uncensored" in the title referred to content that the Walt Disney Company no longer wanted to associate with their star Mickey Mouse. "Lost on a Desert Island" contains stereotyped portrayals of Africans, and "Mickey Mouse in Death Valley" includes gunplay and kidnapping, as well as a blackface gag in which Mickey, in the dark, appears with wide eyes and big lips, crying "Minnie!" in the style of Al Jolson's famous performance of "My Mammy".

== History ==
According to conventional wisdom cited by scholar Thomas Inge, the 1930 Mickey Mouse strips had fallen into the public domain in 1986. Comics historian Bill Blackbeard discovered this supposed fact in his research, and Malibu Graphics considered it an opportunity to present this early material.

Not wanting to draw the wrath of the notoriously protective Walt Disney Company, Eternity printed the comic with completely black covers that did not mention the name "Mickey Mouse". Instead, The Uncensored Mouse cover described the book as "a classic collection of uncensored Floyd Gottfredson comic strips from the 1930s". The comic was sold in a bag, so that potential customers wouldn't flip through it in the store and think it was an official Disney product.

The first issue contained strips from January 13 to March 5, 1930, about two-thirds of the way through "Lost on a Desert Island"; the second issue printed the March 6 to April 26 strips, completing "Desert Island" and beginning "Mickey Mouse in Death Valley". A third issue was planned, and the company hoped to publish all of the strips up to the mid-1930s.

Disney brought an action against Malibu Comics, claiming that the comic infringed on their copyrights. While it was popularly assumed that the strips in The Uncensored Mouse were in the public domain—and Blackbeard and Malibu evidently believed they were—the first week of strips was actually copyrighted on January 3, 1930 and renewed on September 23, 1957. At the time of The Uncensored Mouse, this renewal effectively protected the first week of strips for 75 years from publication: in effect, through 2005.

A story about the lawsuit was broadcast on the syndicated entertainment news program Entertainment Tonight on April 20, 1989. Disney and Malibu settled the suit before it went to court, and Malibu did not publish any further Mickey Mouse strips. In 1998, Disney and other companies lobbied Congress to support the Copyright Term Extension Act, which extended the copyright on Mickey Mouse items through at least 2023.

The complete run of the strip was eventually published in the Walt Disney's Mickey Mouse collection published by Fantagraphics Books. The first volume, 2011's "Race to Death Valley", reprinted both the "Desert Island" and "Death Valley" sequences, although the first story was printed in an "archival feature" section in the back of the book, with an explanation of the historical context for the African stereotypes.
