= Kirby Awards =

Comic book awards

Jack Kirby Awards
- Awarded for: For achievement in comic books
- Venue: San Diego Comic-Con
- Country: United States
- Presented by: Amazing Heroes
- First award: 1985
- Final award: 1987

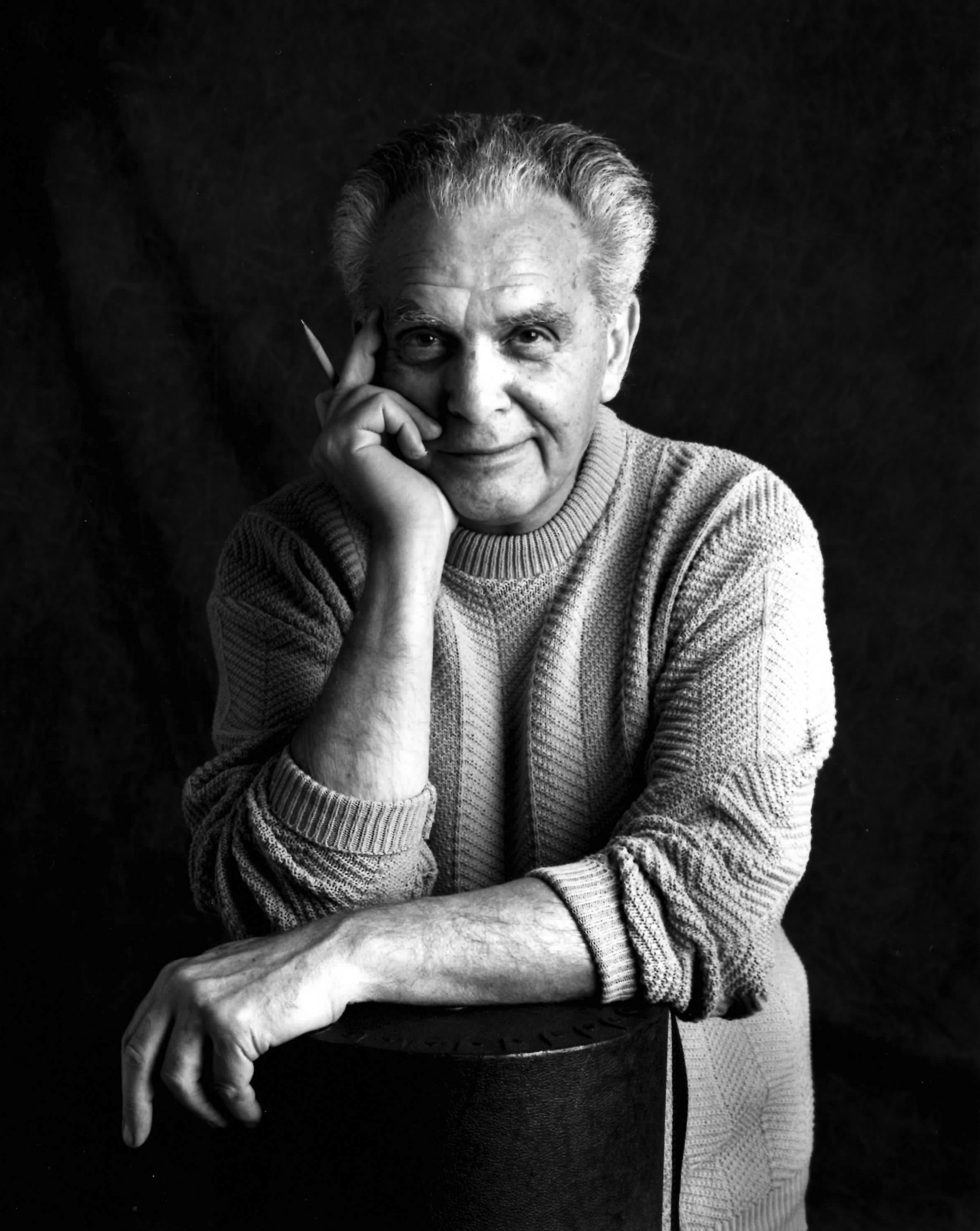
Photo of Jack Kirby taken by Susan Skaar during a session in the studio at Jack's home in Thousand Oaks, CA

The Jack Kirby Comics Industry Awards were a set of awards for achievement in comic books, presented from 1985 to 1987. Voted on by comic-book professionals, the Kirby awards were the first such awards since the Shazam Awards ceased in 1975. Sponsored by Amazing Heroes magazine (which was published by Fantagraphics), and managed by Amazing Heroes managing editor Dave Olbrich, the Kirby Awards were named after the pioneering writer and artist Jack Kirby.

== History ==
The Kirby Awards came about in reaction against the 1983 institution of the Comics Buyer's Guide Fan Awards, which were voted on by fans; Olbrich (and the editors at Fantagraphics) wished to create an award voted on by comics professionals (meaning creators, retailers, and distribution personnel). Nominations for the Kirby Awards were made by Amazing Heroes editors and warehouse employees, with the final ballots printed in issues of Amazing Heroes. The awards themselves were distributed at the annual San Diego Comic-Con, with Jack Kirby himself on hand to congratulate the winners. In 1985, 238 ballots were cast, about 100 of them by comics creators.

In 1987, a dispute arose when Olbrich and Fantagraphics, publisher of Amazing Heroes, each claimed ownership of the awards, and Kirby removed himself from the equation. A compromise was reached, and starting in 1988, the Kirby Award was discontinued. Two new awards were created: the Eisner Award, managed by Olbrich and named after Will Eisner; and the Fantagraphics-managed Harvey Award, named for Harvey Kurtzman. Both of the new awards allowed voting only by comics industry professionals.

== List of Jack Kirby Award winners ==
The following is a list of winners of the Kirby Award, sorted by category.

=== Best Single Issue ===
- 1985 Swamp Thing Annual #2, by Alan Moore, Steve Bissette and John Totleben (DC Comics)
- 1986 Daredevil #227, by Frank Miller and David Mazzucchelli (Marvel Comics)
- 1987 Batman: The Dark Knight Returns #1, by Frank Miller, Klaus Janson and Lynn Varley (DC)

=== Best Continuing Series ===
- 1985 Swamp Thing, by Alan Moore, Steve Bissette and John Totleben (DC)
- 1986 Swamp Thing, by Alan Moore, Steve Bissette and John Totleben (DC)
- 1987 Swamp Thing, by Alan Moore, Steve Bissette and John Totleben (DC)

=== Best Black & White Series ===
- 1985 Cerebus by Dave Sim (Aardvark-Vanaheim)
- 1986 Love & Rockets by Gilbert Hernandez and Jaime Hernandez (Fantagraphics)
- 1987 Cerebus by Dave Sim (Aardvark-Vanaheim)

=== Best Finite Series ===
- 1985 Crisis on Infinite Earths, by Marv Wolfman and George Pérez (DC)
- 1986 Crisis on Infinite Earths, by Marv Wolfman and George Pérez (DC)
- 1987 Watchmen by Alan Moore and Dave Gibbons (DC).

=== Best New Series ===
- 1985 Zot!, by Scott McCloud (Eclipse Comics)
- 1986 Miracleman, by Alan Moore and various artists (Eclipse)
- 1987 Watchmen, by Alan Moore and Dave Gibbons (DC)

=== Best Graphic Album ===
- 1985 Beowulf, by Jerry Bingham (First Comics)
- 1986 The Rocketeer, by Dave Stevens (Eclipse)
- 1987 Batman: The Dark Knight Returns, by Frank Miller and Klaus Janson (DC)

=== Best Writer ===
- 1985 Alan Moore, for Swamp Thing (DC)
- 1986 Alan Moore, for Swamp Thing (DC)
- 1987 Alan Moore, for Watchmen (DC)

=== Best Writer/Artist (single or team) ===
- 1986 Frank Miller and David Mazzucchelli, for Daredevil (Marvel)
- 1987 Alan Moore and Dave Gibbons, for Watchmen (DC)

=== Best Artist ===
- 1985 Dave Stevens, for The Rocketeer (Comico)
- 1986 Steve Rude, for Nexus (First)
- 1987 Bill Sienkiewicz, for Elektra: Assassin (Marvel)

=== Best Art Team ===
- 1985 Steve Bissette and John Totleben, for Swamp Thing (DC)
- 1986 George Pérez and Jerry Ordway, for Crisis On Infinite Earths (DC)
- 1987 Frank Miller, Klaus Janson and Lynn Varley, for Batman: The Dark Knight Returns (DC)

=== Best Cover ===
- 1985 Swamp Thing #34, by Steve Bissette and John Totleben (DC)

=== Best Comics Publication ===
- 1985 Comics Buyer's Guide (Krause)

=== Hall of Fame ===
- 1987 Carl Barks
- 1987 Will Eisner
- 1987 Jack Kirby

== See also ==
- Alley Award
- Bill Finger Award
- Eagle Awards
- Eisner Awards
- Harvey Awards
- Inkpot Award
- National Comics Awards
- Russ Manning Award
- Shazam Awards
