= Roger McKenzie (comics) =

American comic book writer (1950–2026)

- Born: November 8, 1950
- Died: August 21, 2026 (aged 75)
- Areas: Writer, Publisher
- Notable works: Daredevil; Captain America

Roger McKenzie (November 8, 1950 – August 21, 2026) was an American comic book writer best known for his work on Daredevil with Frank Miller. McKenzie has also written for a variety of independent comics publishers, such as Pacific Comics, Comico Comics, Sirius Comics, Pied Piper Comics, and Eclipse Comics.

== Life and career ==
Roger McKenzie was born on November 8, 1950. His first comics work was a seven-page short story titled "Ground Round" in Vampirella #50 (April 1976) published by Warren Publishing. He wrote stories for Warren's black and white magazine titles Creepy, Eerie, and Vampirella from 1976–1982. He worked for DC Comics as well, creating the western character Cinnamon and several stories for the company's horror titles.

McKenzie and Frank Miller's first collaboration was on a two-page story entitled "Slowly, painfully, you dig your way from the cold, choking debris..." published in DC Comics' Weird War Tales #68 (Oct. 1978). McKenzie became the writer on Marvel Comics' Daredevil with issue #151 (March 1978), and gave the series a dark tone reminiscent of his horror writings. Miller joined McKenzie on the series starting with #158 (May 1979).

In 1979, he collaborated with artist Ernie Colón on an adaptation of Battlestar Galactica for Marvel. McKenzie wrote Captain America (1978–1980) as well. McKenzie and artist Don Perlin developed the idea of Captain America running for the office of President of the United States. Marvel originally rejected the idea but it would be used later by Roger Stern and John Byrne in Captain America #250 (October 1980). McKenzie and Perlin received credit for the idea on the letters page at Stern's insistence. McKenzie and Perlin would also receive credit in the follow-up story in What If? #26 (April 1981). McKenzie wrote several stories for the Marvel Fanfare anthology series including a two-part Iron Man vs. Doctor Octopus tale drawn by Ken Steacy.

He wrote the Star Hawks newspaper comic strip for United Feature Syndicate in 1981.

From 1984 to 1987, McKenzie wrote Sun Runners (working with artist Pat Broderick and then Glen Johnson) comics for publishers Pacific Comics, Eclipse Comics, Sirius Comics, and Amazing Comics.

From 1986 to 1988, McKenzie was involved with the independent publisher Pied Piper Comics. Along with Mark L. Hamlin, McKenzie was co-founder and co-publisher of Pied Piper, while also acting as the company's managing editor.

After a long hiatus from comics, McKenzie returned in 2015 to serve as Executive Editor of the Charlton Neo line of comics, where he wrote for The Charlton Arrow and Charlton Wild Frontier.

From February 2015, he wrote the Spookman weekly comic strip with Sandy Carruthers for the webcomic site Pix-C.

McKenzie died in hospice care on the morning of August 21, 2026, at the age of 75. In his final months he was suffering from heart failure and kidney disease. He was survived by his wife, Tami.

== Bibliography ==
=== Amazing Comics ===
- Amazing Comics Premieres #1 – Ninja Bots (Feb. 1987)
- The Sun Runners Christmas Special #1 (Mar. 1987) – stories "Rocky Horror" and "Voices"
- Tales of the Sun Runners #3 (Feb. 1987) – continued from Sirius Comics title

=== Charlton Neo ===
- The Charlton Arrow #1–5 (2014–2016)
- Charlton Wild Frontier #1 (2015)

=== Comico: The Comic Company ===
- Next Man #1–5 (1985)

=== DC Comics ===
- Batman #325 (1980)
- Black Lightning #11 (The Ray backup story) (1978)
- Cancelled Comic Cavalcade #1 (1978)
- Doorway to Nightmare #3 (1978)
- House of Mystery #259, 299 (1978–1981)
- House of Secrets #151 (1978)
- Men of War #5–11 (Gravedigger) (1978)
- The Unexpected #187, 191 (1978–1979)
- Weird War Tales #61–64, 68 (1978)
- Weird Western Tales #48–49 (Cinnamon) (1978)
- Welcome Back, Kotter #9 (1978)

=== Deluxe Comics ===
- Wally Wood's T.H.U.N.D.E.R. Agents #5 (1986)

=== Eclipse Comics ===
- Sun Runners #4–7 (1984–1985) – continuing Pacific Comics series

=== Gold Key Comics ===
- Doctor Solar, Man of the Atom #29–31 (1981–1982)
- Gremlins #11365 (1984)
- Grimm's Ghost Stories #59–60 (1982)

=== Image Comics ===
- Savage Dragon #195, 200, 204 (Knight Watchman backup stories) (2014–2015)

=== Marvel Comics ===
- Battlestar Galactica #1–7, 11–16 (1979–1980)
- Captain America #226–237, 243–245, 250 (1978–1980)
- Captain Marvel #57 (1978)
- Daredevil #151–161, 163–166, 183 (1978–1980, 1982)
- Epic Illustrated #6, 10 (1981–1982)
- Ghost Rider #28–34 (1978–1979)
- Iron Man #159 (1982)
- Marvel Fanfare #1–2, 5, 14–15, 18, 22–23, 32 (1982–1987)
- Marvel Super Special #8 (Battlestar Galactica) (1978)
- Marvel Team-Up #98, 104 (1980–1981)
- The Spectacular Spider-Man #124 (1987)
- The Tomb of Dracula (black and white magazine) #4–5 (1980)
- What If? #26 (1981)

==== Collections ====
- Daredevil/Punisher: Child's Play includes Daredevil #183, 70 pages, February 1988, ISBN 978-0871353511
- Daredevil: Marked for Death collects Daredevil #159–161, 163–164, 96 pages, March 1991, ISBN 978-0871356345
- Daredevil by Frank Miller & Klaus Janson Omnibus collects Daredevil #158–161, 163–166, and 183, 840 pages, March 2007, ISBN 978-0785123439

=== New Comics Group ===
- Young Master #6 (1988)

=== Pacific Comics ===
- Sun Runners #1–3 (1984) – continued by Eclipse Comics

=== Pied Piper Comics ===
- Kamikaze Cat #1 (1987)
- Lawrence & Lim's Ex-Mutants #8 (1987)

=== Sirius Comics ===
- Tales of the Sun Runners #1–2 (1986) – later continued by Amazing Comics

=== Warren Publishing ===
- Creepy #81, 84–87, 89–90, 92–95, 99, 104–105, 114–115, 120, 122, 124–125, 127, 129, 132, 134, 140 (1976–1982)
- Eerie #81, 83, 85, 87, 90, 92, 96, 102 (1977–1979)
- U.F.O. and Alien Comix #1 (1977)
- Vampirella #50, 53, 57–59, 63, 65–67, 82, 91, 94 (1976–1981)
- Warren Presents #1, 6 (1979)

Preceded by Steve Gerber	Captain America writer 1978–1980	Succeeded by Peter B. Gillis
Preceded by Jim Shooter	Ghost Rider writer 1978–1979	Succeeded by Michael Fleisher
Preceded by n/a	Battlestar Galactica writer 1979–1980	Succeeded by Steven Grant and Walt Simonson
Preceded by Peter B. Gillis	Captain America writer 1980	Succeeded by John Byrne and Roger Stern
Preceded by Jim Shooter	Daredevil writer 1978–1980 (with Frank Miller in late 1980)	Succeeded by Frank Miller
