= Highland High School (Bakersfield, California) =

High school in Bakersfield, California, United States

Location
- 2900 Royal Scots Rd. Bakersfield, California 93306; United States; 35°24′04″N 118°55′54″W

Information
- Type: Public High School
- Established: 1970; 56 years ago
- School district: Kern High School District
- Principal: Melissa Donez
- Staff: 106.50 (FTE)
- Grades: 9-12
- Enrollment: 2,543 (2023-2024)
- Student to teacher ratio: 23.88
- Colors: Green,Blue and White
- Athletics conference: South Yosemite Valley League
- Mascot: Scot
- Yearbook: Regalia
- Website: highland.kernhigh.org

Highland High School is a public high school in Bakersfield, California, United States. Established in 1970, it is part of the Kern High School District and serves grades 9 through 12.

The school offers a college preparatory curriculum featuring Advanced Placement (AP) and honors courses, alongside specialized Project Lead the Way programs in engineering and biomedicine. Highland serves as the county site for Kern's deaf and hard-of-hearing program, providing American Sign Language instruction. The school's athletic teams, known as the Scots, compete in the South Yosemite Valley League. Notable alumni include members of the band Korn and jazz singer Gregory Porter.

== Curriculum ==
Highland offers a college preparatory curriculum including Advanced Placement (AP) and Honors courses in English, mathematics, science, social studies, Spanish, French, and other subjects. Two four-year Project Lead the Way programs in engineering and biomedicine are offered. Students may participate in supplemental courses to support literacy and mathematics skills.

== Extracurricular activities ==
Highland provides a wide range of extracurricular opportunities:

=== Athletics ===
Football, basketball, baseball, soccer, wrestling, volleyball, golf, tennis, track and field, swimming, cheerleading, and other sports. Teams compete in the South Yosemite Valley League.

== Campus ==
The campus includes classrooms, science labs, a library, gymnasiums, athletic fields, and music facilities. Highland is also the county site for the deaf and hard-of-hearing program, including American Sign Language (ASL) instruction.

== Notable alumni ==
- Reginald Arvizu - bassist of Korn
- Dale Berry – comic book artist
- Savannah Berry - marathon runner
- Jonathan Davis - lead singer of Korn
- Kris Kohls - drummer of Adema
- Michael Lockwood - guitarist, was married to Lisa Marie Presley
- Derek Mears - actor
- Nicole Parra - California State Assemblywoman
- Gregory Porter - multiple Grammy-winning jazz singer
- Robert Swift - basketball player (transferred to Bakersfield High School)
- Brian Welch - guitarist of Korn
- Grace Fong - concert pianoist professor of music at Chapman college CA.
