= Ex-Mutants =

Comic book series

- Cover to Ex-Mutants vol. 1 #4 (Amazing, 1987). Story by David Lawrence, art by Ron Lim and Tim Dzon.

Publication information
- Publisher: Eternity Comics; Amazing Comics; Pied Piper Comics; Malibu Comics
- Schedule: Monthly
- Format: Ongoing series
- Publication date: 1986–1994
- Main character(s): Belushi; Erin; Angela; Vikki; Lorelei

Creative team
- Created by: David Lawrence; Ron Lim; David Campiti
- Written by: David Lawrence
- Artist: Ron Lim
- Editor: William Davidson

Ex-Mutants is a comic book series created by writer David Lawrence and artist Ron Lim, along with comics packager David Campiti in 1986. It was first published by Eternity Comics and then Amazing Comics, Pied Piper Comics, and finally Malibu/Eternity. Malibu created a shared universe called Shattered Earth with the characters. In 1992, Malibu comics rebooted the franchise with a new continuity. A video game for the Sega Genesis based on the rebooted version was released in 1992, being developed by Malibu Interactive and published by Sega of America, Inc.

== Publication history ==
Campiti first approached Lawrence about the project in the spring of 1986; at that point the comic was going to be titled Young Ex-Mutant Samurai Humans.

Ex-Mutants premiered with a first issue published by Eternity Comics in 1986. The affiliated publisher Amazing released an expanded special edition reprint of #1 the same year, followed by issues #2–5. Contractual problems resulted in a 1987 move to Pied Piper Comics, where the series was retitled Lawrence & Lim's Ex-Mutants for issues #6–8. The same year, Pied Piper also released a one-shot publication: Lawrence & Lim's Ex-Mutants Microseries: Erin.

A legal dispute followed, and after running out of money for the struggle, Lawrence and Lim surrendered; the title returned to Eternity Comics (which by this time was an imprint of Malibu Comics). From December 1987–January 1988, Eternity reprinted issues #6–7, as well as a trade paperback collecting the first Amazing Comics issues #1–3 (as Ex-Mutants: The Saga Begins, also known as Ex-Mutants: A Graphic Novel of the Shattered Earth), followed by another trade paperback in May 1988, collecting issues #4–7 as The Original Ex-Mutants: Gods and Men.

After a legal battle, Malibu/Eternity began a shared universe for the characters called Shattered Earth. From 1988 to 1990, Eternity produced Ex-Mutants: The Shattered Earth Chronicles #1–15. The publisher also released an annual publication in 1988 and the Ex-Mutants Winter Special in 1989. From 1988 to 1989, a solo series for the characters: Solo Ex-Mutants (issues #1-6) was published by Malibu. The Ex-mutants universe was expanded with the spin-offs: The New Humans (1987-1989), Wild Knights (1989), and Shattered Earth (1988-1989).

Malibu Comics published a rebooted version of the characters in Ex-Mutants vol. 2, #1–18 from 1992 to 1994, as part of the Genesis Universe with Protectors and Dinosaurs for Hire.

== Fictional character biographies ==
=== Initial publishers ===
In a near future, an all-out war has decimated the planet, and the hapless survivors and their offspring have been horribly mutated by the toxins released into the environment.

A lone scientist, the three-eyed Dr. Emmanuel Cugat, selects five mutants, one male and four females, to be genetically altered, resequencing their mutated DNA to restore them to humanity. Belushi, Erin, Angela, Vikki, and Lorelei become perfect physical specimens. Dr. Cugat then sends them forth to inspire the shattered Earth. Many of the mutants have other ideas, particularly their nemesis, the monstrous Great Fred. They meet the Wild Knights, an old motorcycle gang that had settled down and were trying to recreate civilization. The Ex-Mutants become friends with their leader, Zack, but they are also pursued by minions of Great Fred. The Wild Knights and Ex-Mutants expel the invaders. The Ex-Mutants discover that they are vulnerable to the external radiation and decided to return to the laboratory of Cugat. In the ruins of Brooklyn, Great Fred captures Dr. Cugat and tries to execute him in public. The Ex-Mutants arrived in time and confront Fred, with help of Zack and his Wild Knights. The attack on Great Fred provokes a rebellion in his mutant subjects. The tyrant is toppled and killed and the Ex-Mutants are put in lab tubes to restore their health.

In the aftermath, Dr. Cugat takes control of the mutant city and incite a new religion, with the Ex-Mutants as gods, to secure his rulership. When they are reawakened, they are uncomfortable with the new treatment. When Dr. Cugat kills a Great Fred partisan, the Ex-Mutants abandon him. They return to the Wild Knights village but discover that it was destroyed by a mutant warlord called Frog. Frog captures them and jailed them with the Wild Knights. Distressed by the failure of his project, Dr. Cugat snaps, rescues his children from Frog and decides to destroy them and the city of Brooklyn with a Russian nuclear bomb.

The series was described as a light-hearted post-nuclear adventure series according to author Lawrence in a 2004 interview in the webzine QRD.

=== Shattered Earth ===
After a legal battle, Malibu Comics continued the story with Ex-Mutants: The Shattered Earth Chronicles. It is revealed that the atomic bomb that destroyed Brooklyn, was a special dimensional bomb, sending the Ex-Mutants and Dr. Cugat to different dimensions. After a time in the Samora dimension, the Ex-Mutants returned to Earth with the assistance of an alien mentor, Simak. They were on a mission to redeem humanity. They found a pair of mutants, father and son, called Chaney and Duff, who become their companions. Lorelei was left behind in Samora, to train and expand her latent psychic powers and help in the bringing of civilization to Earth. Meanwhile, Dr. Cugat went to a hellish dimension, Acarnania, where he is further mutated, but he also meets his New Ex-Mutants, that were also mutated by the bomb. On Earth, the Ex-Mutants toppled a tyrant that acted like an executive for a murderous variant of beisbol. They also entered the domain of a warlord called Baron Wasteland and battled the Sorcerer Dahlgren, brother of Simak. Dahlgren called for assistance from Dr. Cugat who wanted to destroy his old children. Dahlgreen transported Cugat and his minions to Earth. In the battle for the tower of Dahlgren, Baron Wasteland and the sorcerer Dahlgren were killed. Dr. Cugat fell in a bottomless pit after confronting his "son and daughters" and becoming very disappointed with them. Simak became infected with a disease provoked by his brother and died. In spirit, he also expressed disappointment about the Ex-Mutants. The Ex-Mutants settled down in the Baron's Domain, but did nothing to improve the situation, until Lorelei returned from Samora to recreate civilization in a consumerism manner.

Meanwhile, Zack and the rest of the Wild Knights tries to found a new place to live, going into the Great Plains. They meet a genocidal religious cult called the Red Kross, led by a self proclaimed prophet called Mercy, who tried to kill everyone on Earth. The Wild Knights escaped from Mercy, but had to confront him and his followers once again. Mercy planned to use the remaining atomic bombs to annihilate all life on Earth. The series ended before the last confrontation.

=== Malibu Comics ===
Malibu Comics rebooted the Ex-mutants series with a new setting in 1992. In this version of Ex-Mutants, there were three males (Dillon, Ackroyd and Bud) and three females (Shannon, Piper and Tanya). These six were mutants who were gathered by robotic-looking cyborg Professor Kildare and turned into humans. They fought against a local warlord called Sluggo, who was treating other mutants like slaves. Ackroyd and Shannon were the playable characters in the Sega Genesis game.

This second version of the characters did a crossover with the Protectors Universe (Earth-1136), through the Genesis event. The town of Sluggtown and the Ex-Mutants were transported to that reality. They also joined the Protectors in their last battles.

Within the Marvel Comics multiverse, the original Shattered Earth was designated as Earth-68463. The rebooted Universe was given the number Earth-29245.

== Titles related to Shattered Earth ==
Title	Issues	Initial cover date	Final cover date	Notes
Ex-Mutants vol. 1	#1	1986		First issue published by Eternity Comics.
Ex-Mutants vol. 1	#2-5	1987	1987	Issues published by Amazing Comics.
Lawrence & Lim's Ex-Mutants	#6-8	1987	1987	Issues published by Pied Piper Comics. The issues #6 and #7 were reprinted by Malibu Comics, Eternity Imprint.
Lawrence & Lim's Ex-Mutants Microseries: Erin	#1	1987	1987	Issue published by Pied Piper Comics, it consisted of a solo adventure featuring heroine named Erin. The story was reprinted in Solo Ex-Mutants #1.
Ex-Mutants: The Special Edition	#1	1987	1987	Reprinting the first issue by Amazing Comics, with an expanded version of 40 pages.
Ex-Mutants Annual	#1	1988		Published by Malibu Comics by its Eternity imprint.
Ex-Mutants Pin-up Book	#1	1988		One-shot special, published by Malibu Comics by its Eternity imprint.
Ex-Mutants Winter Special	#1	1988		One-shot published by Malibu Comics by its Eternity imprint.
Ex-Mutants The Shattered Earth Chronicles	#1	1988		Ongoing series published by Malibu Comics by its Eternity imprint.
Ninja	#1-12	1986	1988	Independent comic published by Eternity Comics and later by Malibu. In it issue #11, it was established that this comic happened before the nuclear war mentioned in the Ex-Mutants series, joining both series in the same continuity.
Ninja Special	#1	1987	1987	One-shot special of the Ninja series, that happens in the middle of the story of that series.
Solo Ex-Mutants	#1-6	1988	1989	Published by Malibu Comics by its Eternity imprint.
The New Humans	#1-3	1987	1987	Ongoing series, published by Pied Piper Comics.
The New Humans	#1-15	1987	1989	Ongoing series, published by Malibu Comics by its Eternity imprint (first three issues are reprints of the Pied Piper series).
New Humans Annual - The Shattered Earth Chronicles	#1	1989		Annual of The New Humans, published by Malibu Comics by its Eternity imprint.
Shattered Earth	#1-9	1988	1989	Ongoing series, published by Malibu Comics by its Eternity imprint.
Wild Knights	#1-10	1988	1988	Unfinished series, published by Malibu Comics by its Eternity imprint.
