= Dale Berry =

American cartoonist (born 1960)

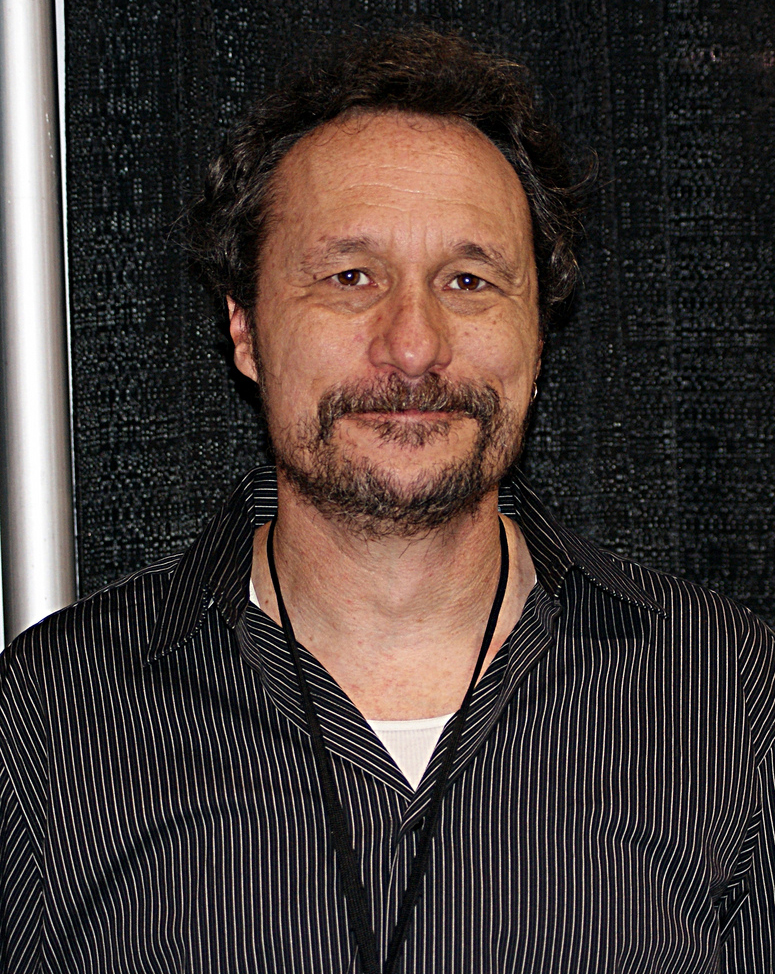
- Berry in 2011
- Born: April 20, 1960 (age 66) Taft, California, US
- Collaborators: Gary Phillips

Dale W. Berry (born April 20, 1960) is an American comic book artist, author, and radio personality. Beginning in the 1980s, Berry produced comics. He created the comic Ninja Funnies and the series Tales of the Moonlight Cutter, which features a hero who battles deadly ghosts in 12th-century China. Berry later founded the press Myriad Publications. With Gary Phillips, he co-authored The Be-Bop Barbarians: Comic Book Bohemians to a 1950s Jazz Beat, a 2019 work set in 1950s Harlem.

Berry worked as a fencing instructor at California State University, Bakersfield. He started his career in radio in 1989 on a jazz and soul station and in the mid-1990s became a personality on the rock station KRZR.

== Biography ==
Dale W. Berry was born on April 20, 1960, in Taft, California. Berry graduated from Highland High School. Berry attended Bakersfield College, where he studied scenic design and theater stagecraft. At the University of California, Santa Barbara, Berry received a certificate in commercial art, having studied computer graphics, airbrush, and design. He lived in Bakersfield in the 1980s. When he worked at California State University, Bakersfield, he taught fencing. The Fox Theater enlisted him to be a stagehand and for marketing duties. According to Berry, at the theater he had the opportunity to collaborate with Aerosmith, Kiss, and Ray Charles.

Berry began his career as a radio host in 1989 in Bakersfield at KKBB, a station that played jazz and soul. He spent five years there. In 1994, he hosted weekend shows for KNZR-FM and created a "KNZR Wild Hare" logo for them. Beginning in the mid-1990s, Berry worked at the rock music station KRZR as a radio personality. He initially hosted weekend shows, transitioned to weekday nights shows, and later returned to weekend shows. In 2007, Berry was on air on Saturdays between 6:00 pm and 12:00 am and on Sundays between 4:00 pm and 9:00 pm. Berry was a resident of San Francisco in 2013.

=== Comics career ===
Berry started professional comics work in 1986. As a resident of Bakersfield in the 1980s, he produced comics. Ninja Funnies, his inaugural work, was published by Eternity Comics and surpassed 35,000 in sales. Other comic books he authored early in his career were White Lotus and The Moonlight Cutter which were published by the Los Angeles company CFW. Berry founded Myriad Publications in Bakersfield with fellow illustrators and authors. Myriad: a San Joaquin Graphic Story Collection was their inaugural creation. In 1993, Berry said his major artistic inspirations are Chinese landscapes, Jademan Comics, manga, the Japanese art ukiyo-e, and the comic book artists Neal Adams, Frank Frazetta, Paul Gulacy, and Jim Steranko. Berry used his fencing experience to choreograph elaborate fight scenes.

In 2013, Berry worked as a cartoonist, handling everything from writing, illustrating, releasing, and marketing. Each installment of his Moonlight Cutter comic series can take as long as two years to finish. Set in 12th-century China, the Moonlight Cutter series showcases architecture and attire from that era. It stars a hero who battles deadly spirits with an enchanted sword. He originated the story in a martial arts magazine, the Studio G–published Kung Fu Warriors. The third novel in the series is Tears of the Dead. Berry said in 2013 that he hoped to one day visit China, where his Moonlight Cutter series is set, as he had not traveled there yet.

Edward Pollard, the editor of the magazine Black Belt, called Tales of the Moonlight Cutter "historically and culturally accurate as possible, down to authentic ritual garb and even a verbatim translation of a complete Taoist exorcism". In a positive review, Ray Tate of Silver Bullet Comics wrote, "the way in which Mr. Berry dialogues and handles the artistic composure of the characters creates a genuine resonance" and "possession and the exotic backdrop [are used] to good effect".

With Gary Phillips, Berry co-authored the book The Be-Bop Barbarians: Comic Book Bohemians to a 1950s Jazz Beat, which is set in Harlem in 1955 and features three African-American comic book artists. The trio navigate bigotry and Cold War tensions. Martha Cornog of the Library Journal praised the book, writing, "Real-life inspiration plus juicy dollops of pulp keep the story sadly believable yet entertaining." Berry contributed to the 2021 book A Handbook from Mystery Writers of America, discussing how he makes graphic novels.

== Bibliography ==
- Berry, Dale (2002). Tales of the Moonlight Cutter #1: Debut!. Myriad Publications. ISBN 978-0-9773222-1-3.
- Berry, Dale (2004). Tales of the Moonlight Cutter #2: Silk and Spear. Myriad Publications. ISBN 978-0-9773222-2-0.
- Berry, Dale (2007). Tales of the Moonlight Cutter #3: Tears of the Dead. Myriad Publications. ISBN 978-0-9773222-0-6.
- Berry, Dale (2010). Tales of the Moonlight Cutter #4: Hell's Summoner. Myriad Publications. ISBN 978-0-9773222-3-7.
- Berry, Dale; Castillo, Sebastian; Zailo, Robert (2012). Tales of the Moonlight Cutter #5: Grimoire. Myriad Publications. ISBN 978-0-9773222-4-4.
- Phillips, Gary; Berry, Dale W. (2019). The Be-Bop Barbarians. Pegasus Books. ISBN 978-1-68177-776-4.
