= Pied Piper Comics =

Defunct American comic book publishing company

- Founded: 1986; 39 years ago
- Founder: Mark L. Hamlin and Roger McKenzie
- Defunct: 1988; 37 years ago
- Headquarters location: Editorial office: Wheeling, West Virginia; Business office: Wyoming, Michigan
- Key people: David Campiti
- Publication types: Comics
- Fiction genres: Superheroes

Pied Piper Comics was a short-lived American comic book publishing company that operated from 1986 to 1988. The company was founded by Mark L. Hamlin and Roger McKenzie, with writer/editor David Campiti playing a major role.

== Origins ==
According to David Campiti, Pied Piper's origins were tied to two other publishers with which he was associated at the time: Amazing (full name: Amazing Publishing Company) and Wonder Comics, both of which were financed by comics distributor Scott Mitchell Rosenberg and a small group of investors. The plan was that Campiti would package comics for all three publishers through his studio Campiti and Associates, with Pied Piper handling projects in the form of posters and graphic novels. Amazing published black-and-white comics, while Wonder Color published comics in color.

Hamlin previously worked as a sales and marketing representative for Comico: The Comic Company; Pied Piper Comics was a play on Hamlin's name and the legend of the Pied Piper of Hamelin. McKenzie was a comics writer most well-known for his prior work for Marvel Comics.

== Overview ==
Hamlin, McKenzie, and Campiti shared the title of Publisher of Pied Piper Comics, with Campiti also holding the title of Editor-in-Chief. Hamlin was Financial Manager and McKenzie was Managing Editor. The company's business offices were in Wyoming, Michigan, while its editorial offices were in Camptiti's hometown of Wheeling, West Virginia.

Campiti personally edited most of the publisher's comics as well as writing a number of titles.

Pied Piper temporarily acquired David Lawrence and Ron Lim's Ex-Mutants after the title began with two publishers associated with Campiti and financial backer Rosenberg: Eternity Comics and Amazing. Campiti left Rosenberg's various ventures in 1987, taking Lawrence & Lim's Ex-Mutants with him to Pied Piper. The company also published Lawrence & Lim's The New Humans.

== Demise ==
Pied Piper collapsed in 1988, with a number of titles, such as Hero Alliance and Power Factor, being continued by Campiti's own publishing venture, Innovation Publishing, while Ex-Mutants and The New Humans both returned to Eternity (which at that point was an imprint of another Rosenberg operation, Malibu Comics).

== Titles ==
- Beast Warriors of Shaolin #1–3 (1987)
- Ex-Mutants:
  - Lawrence & Lim's Ex-Mutants vol. 1, #6–8 (1987) — acquired from Amazing; later acquired by Eternity Comics
  - Lawrence & Lim's Ex-Mutants Microseries: Erin #1 (1987)
- Lawrence & Lim's The New Humans #1–3 (1987) — later acquired by Eternity Comics
- Hero Alliance: End of the Golden Age (1986), Pied Piper Graphic Album #1 — collected material from Sirius Comics, later acquired by Wonder Comics, and then Innovation Publishing
- Mr. Doom (1987)
- Phigments #2 (1987) — series acquired from Amazing Comics
- Power Factor #2 (1987) — series acquired from Wonder Comics, then continued by Innovation Publishing
