= Emilia Castañeda Martínez =

Spanish painter

- Born: 7 November 1943 (age 82)

Emilia Castañeda Martínez (born 7 November 1943) is a Spanish painter.

She was born in Madrid, but moved to Barcelona with her family as a child. She began training in 1956 at the academy of the painter Víctor Esteban Ripaux and at Escola de la Llotja in 1959 and Escuela Massana in 1969. By the 70s she had finished her studies and became a professional painter.

Her works focus on the nude, generally placed in an abstract and dreamlike background that include objects that offer clues to the story told by the central figures. Her work has been compared with that of modernists such as Gustav Klimt, Anglada Camarasa and with the French symbolist school. Some of her works have been rejected by art galleries due to their erotic themes.
