= Charles Sultan =

American illustrator

Charles Sultan, in an undated photo

Charles Solomon Sultan (November 16, 1913 – February 28, 1984) was an American illustrator and editor known for his work during the Golden Age of Comic Books, and for his later work in pulp fiction.

== Biography ==
Sultan was born in Brooklyn, New York, to a Jewish family. In 1931, he quit school to become a sign painter, so as to help support his family financially; he was so successful that he was able to enroll in the Art Students League of New York, where he studied under Walter Biggs, John Steuart Curry, and George Bridgman.

He began illustrating various pulp magazines in 1936. In 1939, he joined Eisner & Iger, and by 1940 was an art director for Harry "A" Chesler. He also worked for Fawcett Comics (where he created the character of "Spy Smasher"), Fiction House, and Quality Comics.

In 1942, Sultan was drafted into the US Military, and served four years, during which he drew comic strips for a military newspaper. He subsequently illustrated comic books for DC Comics, EC Comics, Better Publications, and a variety of other publishers. He also edited and published pocket books, and provided illustrations for adventure magazines.

He continued to illustrate men's adventure magazines into the 1970s. He died in Camarillo, California, on February 28, 1984.

Sultan's brother-in-law was Lou Fine.
