= Innovation Publishing =

Defunct American comic book company

- Founded: 1988; 37 years ago
- Founder: David Campiti
- Defunct: 1994
- Headquarters location: Wheeling, West Virginia, U.S.
- Publication types: Comics
- Nonfiction topics: Superheroes, licensed properties

Innovation Publishing (also known as Innovation Books and the Innovative Corporation) was an American comic book company based in Wheeling, West Virginia. It was co-founded by David Campiti in 1988 after writing a business proposal and raising US$400,000 to finance its launch. Innovation became number four in market share, below Marvel Comics, DC Comics, and Dark Horse Comics.

== Overview ==
The company published many adaptations and tie-in series of existing media properties, such as Anne Rice's novels Interview with the Vampire, The Vampire Lestat, and Queen of the Damned. It also published adaptations of novels such as Terry Pratchett's The Colour of Magic and The Light Fantastic, Piers Anthony's On a Pale Horse, Don Pendleton's The Executioner, Larry Niven and Jerry Pournelle's Lucifer's Hammer, and Gene Wolfe's The Shadow of the Torturer; the TV series Dark Shadows, Quantum Leap, Beauty and the Beast and Lost In Space; films such as Forbidden Planet, Psycho, Child's Play, and A Nightmare on Elm Street; and even the 1949 Republic movie serial King of the Rocket Men.

Campiti brought to Innovation a number of properties he had overseen with other publishers, including Hero Alliance (originally with Sirius Comics, Pied Piper Comics, and Wonder Color), Power Factor (originally with Wonder Color and then Pied Piper), and Mark Martin's Gnatrat (originally with Sirius Comics). Innovation's original series included Justice Machine and writer Mike W. Barr's Maze Agency (both series originally with Comico), and Legends of the Stargrazers.

Innovation was one of the first companies to delve heavily into recruiting talents from Brazil, starting the American careers of Mike Deodato (Beauty and the Beast) and Joe Bennett (The Light Fantastic), among others. 1992 Russ Manning "Best Newcomer" Award–winner Mike Okamoto broke into American comics in 1990 illustrating the Innovation titles The Maze Agency and Hero Alliance.

Campiti left Innovation in 1993 to launch Glass House Graphics, a studio/agency for illustrators, writers, painters, and digital designers. Shortly thereafter, in early 1994, Innovation closed, leaving substantial debts to creators, printers, and investors.

== Titles published ==
Hero Alliance #12 (Dec. 1990): Good girl art by penciler Mike Okamoto, inked by Mike Witherby.

=== Adaptations ===
- Anne Rice
  - Interview with the Vampire (1991–1993), #1–12
  - The Master of Rampling Gate (1991), TPB
  - The Vampire Lestat (1990–1991), #1–12 (collected in 1991 as The Vampire Lestat: The Graphic Novel)
  - The Queen of the Damned (1991–1993), #1–11 (#12 is unpublished)
  - The Vampire Companion (1990–1992), #1–3
- Beauty and the Beast (1993), #1–6
- Bozo, the World's Most Famous Clown (1992), #1
- Child's Play
- The Colour of Magic (1991), #1–4
- Dark Shadows
  - Book One (1992–1993), #1–4
  - Book Two (1993), #1–4
  - Book Three (1993), #1
- Forbidden Planet (1992–1993), #1–4 (collected in 1993 as Forbidden Planet: The Saga of the Krell)
- The Light Fantastic (1992–1993), #1–4
- Lost in Space
  - v1 (1991–1993), #1–18
  - Lost in Space: Project Robinson (1993), #1
- Lucifer's Hammer (1993), #1–2 (#3–6 unpublished)
- Mack Bolan: The Executioner (1993), #1–3 (#4 is unpublished)
- A Nightmare on Elm Street
  - Freddy's Dead: The Final Nightmare (1991), #1–3 and 3-D (reprints #3 with 3-D sections)
  - Nightmares on Elm Street (1991–1992), #1–6
  - A Nightmare on Elm Street: The Beginning (1993), #1–2 (#3 unpublished)
- On a Pale Horse (1991–1993), #1–5 (#6 is unpublished)
- Quantum Leap (1991–1993), #1–13
- The Phantom of the Opera (1991), TPB
- Psycho (1992), #1–3
- Rocket Man: King of the Rocket Men (1991), #1–4
- The Shadow of the Torturer (1991), #1–3
- Sherlock Holmes: A Study in Scarlet (1989), TPB

=== Original series ===
- 3×3 Eyes (translation of the manga)
- Ack the Barbarian (1991), #1
- All Hallow's Eve (1991), #1
- Angel of Death (1990), #1–4
- Angry Shadows (1989), #1
- Avenue X (1992), #1
- Black and White Magic! (1991), #1
- Biff Thundersaur (1991), #1
- Celestial Mechanics: The Adventures of Widget Wilhelmina Jones (1990–1991), #1–3
- Cobalt Blue (trade paperback, 1989) — by Mike Gustovich and Keith Pollard
- Cyberpunk
  - Cyberpunk Graphic Novel #1 (1989)
  - v1 (1989–1990), #1–2 (reprints the 1989 graphic novel)
  - Book Two v1 (1990), #1–2 (collected in 1990 as Cyberpunk Book Two graphic novel #1)
  - The Seraphim Files (1990), #1–2 (collected in 1990 as Cyberpunk: The Seraphim Files Book One)
- The Dead Heat (1990), #1 (All American Comics imprint)
- Equinox Chronicles (1991), #1-2
- Gnatrat: The Movie (1986)
- The Group Larue (1989), #1–3 (collected as The Group Larue Graphic Novel #1)
- Headman (1990), #1
- Hero Alliance
  - End of the Golden Age (1989), #1–3 (reprints the Pied Piper Comics graphic album)
  - v2 (1989–1991), #1–17 (continues from Wonder Comics)
  - Hero Alliance Annual (1990), #1
  - Hero Alliance & Justice Machine: Identity Crisis (1990), #1
  - Hero Alliance Quarterly (1991–1992), #1–4
  - Hero Alliance Special (1992), #1
- Justice Machine (from Comico)
  - The New Justice Machine (1989–1990)
  - Justice Machine Summer Spectacular (1990)
  - v3 (1990–1991), #1–7
- Lunatic Fringe (1989), #1–2
- Legends of the Stargrazers (1989–1990), #1–6 (collected as Legends of the Stargrazers Graphic Novels #1 & 2)
- Maze Agency
  - v1 (1989–1990), #8–23 (from Comico)
  - Annual (1990), #1
  - Special (1990), #1
- Mangle Tangle Tales (1990), #1
- Masques (1992), #1–2
- Media Starr (1989), #1–3 (collected as Media Starr Graphic Novel #1)
- Neon City (1991), #1
- Neon City: After the Fall (1992), #1
- Newstralia (1989–1990), #1–5
- Alex Niño's Nightmare (1989), #1
- Bruce Jones' Outer Edge (1993), #1
- Power Factor
  - v1 (1990–1991), #1–3 (#1 reprints Wonder Comics and #2 reprints Pied Piper Comics)
  - Special (1991), #1
- Professor Om (1990), #1
- Bruce Jones' Razor's Edge (1993), #1
- Walt Kelly's Santa Claus Adventures (1990)
- Scaramouch (1990–1991), #1–2
- Sentry Special (1991), #1 (a Hero Alliance character)
- Seraphim (1990), #1
- Straw Men (1989–1990), #1–8 (All-American Comics imprint)
- SoulQuest (1989), TPB
- Timedrifter (1990–1991), #1–3
- Torchy (1991–1992), #1–5 (reprints from Quality Comics)
- Vigil: Fall from Grace (1992), #1–2 (collected as Vigil: Fall from Grace)
- Vigil: The Golden Parts (1992), #1
- Vigial: Kukulkan (1993), #1
- Wonderworlds (1992), #1

== See also ==
- Millennium Publications
