= Sunrise Distribution =

Comic book distributor

- Industry: Comic books
- Founded: 1980s
- Founder: Scott Mitchell Rosenberg
- Defunct: 1988; 38 years ago
- Fate: Bankruptcy
- Headquarters: Commerce, California
- Key people: Dave Olbrich; Brian David-Marshall; David Campiti; Tom Mason
- Services: Distribution, publishing
- Subsidiaries: Eternity Comics; Imperial Comics; Amazing; Wonder Color; Malibu Comics

Sunrise Distribution (a.k.a. Sunrise Comics and Games) was a Commerce, California-based comic book distributor which operated in the early-to-mid 1980s. Owned by Scott Mitchell Rosenberg, the company was intimately connected to a number of small comic book publishers from that era, including Eternity Comics and Malibu Comics, as well as three extremely short-lived publishers: Amazing, Imperial Comics, and Wonder Color.

== History ==
Sunrise Distribution evolved from Rosenberg's mail order comics business, Direct Comics, which he had founded when he was 13 years old.

=== Publishing ventures ===
==== Eternity Comics ====
In early 1986, income from Rosenberg's comics distribution business allowed him to privately finance Eternity Comics, originally based in New York City and helmed by Brian David-Marshall. Writer/editor David Campiti worked as a packager to supply content for Eternity.

==== Amazing and Wonder Color ====
Beginning in the summer of 1986, after disputes arose between Marshall and Campiti, Rosenberg (along with fellow investors Paula Brown, Mitch Everitt, and Jules Zimmerman) provided capital for Campiti to form two new small publishers: Amazing and Wonder Color, with business offices for both publishers based in the same location in Long Beach, California. Marshall, meanwhile, retained control of Eternity.

Amazing and Wonder Color were affiliated with another publisher with which Campiti was involved: Pied Piper Comics. The plan was that Campiti would package comics for all three publishers through his studio Campiti and Associates, with Pied Piper handling projects in the form of posters and graphic novels. Amazing published black-and-white comics, while Wonder Color published comics in color.

Wonder Color's staff included investor Paula Brown as publisher, editor-in-chief Campiti, and consulting editor Roger McKenzie. Writer David Lawrence edited a few titles.

==== Malibu Comics and Imperial Comics ====
Near the end of 1986, Rosenberg and his investors financed two new publishers: Imperial Comics, based in Brooklyn, New York, and helmed by Marshall; and Malibu Comics, based in Calabasas, California, headed by Dave Olbrich (previously an employee of Sunrise Distribution) and cartoonist Tom Mason. John Arcudi served as an editor for Imperial Comics.

==== Mergers ====
In the spring of 1987, Sunrise announced that due to cash flow issues, it would not be able to pay its client publishers until July.

Concurrently, Rosenberg revealed his connection to Amazing, Eternity, Imperial, Malibu, and Wonder Color, and declared that he was assuming direct control of all five publishers. At this point, Rosenberg shut down Amazing, Imperial, and Wonder Color, while keeping Eternity Comics as a Malibu brand. Some Imperial titles moved to Malibu/Eternity; a few Amazing and Wonder Color titles were retained by Campiti and moved to Pied Piper Comics.

=== Sunrise bankruptcy ===
Sunrise went bankrupt and abruptly folded in the summer of 1988, during the "black-and-white implosion". This left a number of small publishers without the cash flow to continue, and they, too, went out of business. Two of Sunrise's clients, the West Coast publishers Blackthorne Publishing and Fantagraphics, sued the distributor, but ultimately, neither publisher was able to recoup its losses.

Rosenberg continued with Malibu, which survived into the mid-1990s, with many ups and downs, before being acquired by Marvel Comics in 1994.

== Analysis ==
In 2015, Tom Mason, a co-founder of Malibu Comics, described Rosenberg's operations this way:

He secretly financed four (yes, that’s right) comic book companies with the idea that they would publish comics, he’d push them through his existing distribution channel at Sunrise, then sell individual copies by mail order through yet another company of his called Direct Comics. Having a distribution company that distributes books from multiple publishers, then expands to publishing its own books while also running a mail order division isn’t a bad way to create a vertically-integrated company without many assets. Unfortunately, he did it in secret, and had been trying to manipulate the market to create "hot" comics that could be sold at higher prices post-publication, and it all went bad when the bubble of inflated high-priced "hot" comics burst. Sunrise was bankrupt and shut down leaving behind a trail of bad debt that hurt a lot of small publishers at the same time Malibu was launching.

== Publishers financed by Sunrise ==
Publisher name	Founder(s)	Initial location	Year began	Year closed	Fate	Notes
Eternity Comics	Brian David-Marshall; Tony Eng	Boulder, Colorado	Spring 1986	1988	Became an imprint of Malibu, in use until 1994	Moved to Brooklyn, New York, in 1987, and then Newbury Park, California, by the end of 1987
Amazing	David Campiti	Long Beach, California (business office)	Summer 1986	1987	A few select titles moved to Innovation Publishing	Full name: Amazing Publishing Company; Camptiti ran the company from his home of Wheeling, West Virginia
Wonder Color	David Campiti	Long Beach, California (business office)	Summer 1986	1987	A few select titles moved to Innovation Publishing	Office of Publication address (listed in indicia): 1841-B East 65th Street, Long Beach, CA 90805; Camptiti ran the company from his home of Wheeling, West Virginia
Imperial Comics	Brian David-Marshall	Boulder, Colorado	Fall 1986	1987	Some titles moved to Eternity/Malibu	Moved to Brooklyn, New York, in 1987
Malibu Comics	Dave Olbrich; Tom Mason	Calabasas, California	Fall 1986	c. 1996	Acquired by Marvel Comics in 1994	Didn't start publishing until 1987; defunct by 1996

== Amazing Comics titles ==
- Amazing Comics Premieres #1–5 (Feb.–Aug. 1987) — showcase title; contributors include Roger McKenzie, Kevin VanHook, David Lawrence, Sam Kieth, Ron Lim, and David Campiti
- Barney the Invisible Turtle #1 (1987) — by Rick Rodolfo
- Blip and C.C.A.D.S #1–2 (1987)
- Daemon Mask #1 (1987) — by Stuart Hopen and Russ Martin
- Domino Chance: Roach Extraordinaire (1987) — by Kevin Lenagh
- Ex-Mutants: The Special Edition (Spring 1987) — reprinting the first issue as published by Eternity
- Ex-Mutants #2–5 (1987) — by David Lawrence and Ron Lim; moved to Pied Piper Comics
- The Gajit Gang #1 (1987)
- Jack Frost #1–2 (1987) — by Kevin VanHook
- Phigments #1 (1987) — art by Evan Dorkin; later acquired by Pied Piper Comics
- Tales of the Sun Runners #3 (Feb. 1987) — by Roger McKenzie and Glen Johnson; acquired from Sirius Comics
- The Sun Runners Christmas Special #1 (Mar. 1987) — contributors include Roger McKenzie and Kelley Jones
- Wabbit Wampage #1 (1987) — by Stephen D. Sullivan; based on a board game he had earlier developed with Pacesetter Ltd

== Wonder Color titles ==
- G.I. R.A.M.B.O.T. #1 (Apr. 1987)
- Hero Alliance #1 (May 1987) — moved to Pied Piper Comics
- Power Factor #1 (May 1987) — moved to Pied Piper Comics
- Terraformers (2 issues, April–May 1987) — art by Kelley Jones

== Imperial Comics titles ==
- Battle to the Death #1 (1987) — moved to Eternity Comics
- Blackstar (2 issues, Dec. 1986–Feb. 1987) — by Jenkins, Matthews, and Phred
- Dark Comics #1 (1987)
- Nazrat (4 issues, Nov. 1986–Apr. 1987) — by Jerry Frazee; moved to Eternity Comics
- Probe (2 issues, Feb. 1987–Apr. 1987) — by Frank Turner; moved to Eternity Comics

== See also ==
- Capital City Distribution
- Pacific Comics
- New Media/Irjax
