= Bo Hampton =

American comic book and cartoon artist (born 1954)

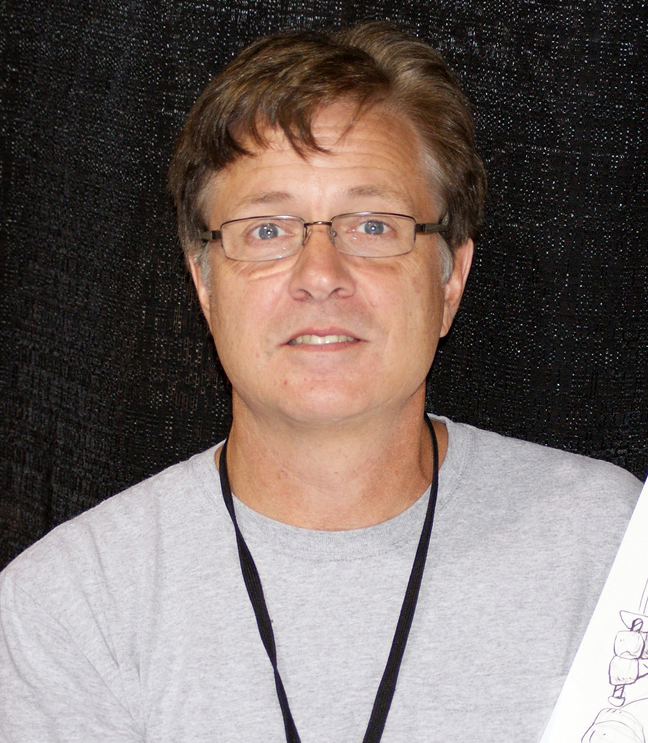
- Hampton in June 2011
- Born: 1954 (age 71–72) North Carolina
- Area: Artist

Bo Hampton (born 1954 in North Carolina) is an American comic book and cartoon artist. He is the older brother of fellow comics-creator Scott Hampton.

He graduated from the School of Visual Arts, New York City, where he studied under Will Eisner and Al Williamson. (Hampton later worked as Eisner's studio assistant.) He drew, wrote, and painted comics and graphic novels for 15 years, always with a bent toward realism that was fairly uncommon in the medium. Some art highlights from that period include Viking Glory a 96-page graphic novel for DC Comics, Legend of Sleepy Hollow for Tundra Publishing and Verdilak, a horror story co-written and painted for NBM Publishing.

Hampton spent a year as a professor at Savannah College of Art and Design, helping to develop the original incarnation of their Sequential Arts program before moving into the realms of storyboarding animated shows and TV commercials. He was behind one of the most popular UK adverts of all times — "Smash Means Mash."

He has worked on Extreme Ghostbusters for SONY (TV and Full length video feature) as well as Superman (Warner Bros.) and Batman animation for Cartoon Network spot. He has done live storyboard work for commercial clients including Papa John's Pizza, Bellsouth, Coca-Cola, Motorola and many more. Ad agencies that use his work regularly include McCann-Erickson Washington, D.C., Pearson McMahon Fletcher and England, Indianapolis, Fricks-Firestone Atlanta and over 40 more all over the U.S.

== Selected works ==
- The Saga of Swamp Thing #14–15 (DC Comics, June–July 1983)
- "Girl of My Schemes," in Alien Worlds #4 (Pacific Comics, Sept. 1983)
- Moon Knight #34, 36–38 (Marvel Comics, Nov. 1983, Mar. 1984–July 1984)
- "The Maiden and the Dragon," in Alien Worlds #9 (Eclipse Comics, Jan. 1985)
- Greylore #1–5 (Sirius Comics, 1985–1986)
- New Mutants vol. 1, #63 (Marvel Comics, May 1988)
- Total Eclipse #1–5 (Eclipse Comics, May 1988–Apr. 1989)
- Viking Glory — The Viking Prince (DC Comics, Aug. 1991)
- Legend of Sleepy Hollow (Tundra Publishing, 1992)
- Legends of the Dark Knight #35–36 (DC Comics, Aug. 1992)
- Batman: Castle of the Bat (DC Comics, 1994)
- Uther: The Half Dead King (NBM Publishing, 1994)
- Verdilak (NBM Publishing, 1996)
- Batman: Other Realms (DC Comics, 1998)
- The Dreaming #43 (Vertigo Comics, Dec. 1999)
- "The Willful Death of a Stereotype," in Expo 2001 (The Expo, 2001)
- Demons of Sherwood (IDW Publishing, 2009)
