= Hero Alliance =

Comic book superhero team

The Hero Alliance
- Hero Alliance #12 (Innovation Publishing, Dec. 1990); pencils by Mike Okamoto, inks by Mike Witherby.

Publication information
- Publisher: Pied Piper Comics; Wonder Comics; Innovation Publishing
- First appearance: Pied Piper Graphic Album #1 - Hero Alliance (Pied Piper Comics, Dec. 1986)
- Created by: Kevin Juaire; David Campiti; Ron Lim; Mike Witherby; Bart Sears; Rick Bryant

In-story information
- Member(s): Victor; Sentry; Argent; Golden Guard; Hover; Powerhause; Castor; Pollux; Delphi; Tawny Winters; Gossamer

The Hero Alliance is a fictional American team of comic book superheroes in an eponymous series mostly published by companies associated with David Campiti, including his own Innovation Publishing. The group was created by writer Kevin Juaire and artists Ron Lim (pencils), Mike Witherby (pencils), Bart Sears (inks), and Rick Bryant (inks).

== Publication history ==
Hero Alliance first appeared in a 1986 "graphic novel" by Pied Piper Comics in Pied Piper Graphic Album #1 — Hero Alliance. The team's adventures continued directly into a Hero Alliance vol. 1, issue #1, (Note: Described as "published 8 times per year" in the indicia.) published by the short-lived publisher Wonder Comics in 1987.

The original set of stories were reprinted — with minor edits and additional pages — as a three-issue limited series by Campiti's Innovation Publishing in 1989. Innovation then released a regular series, written by David Lawrence, which ran for seventeen issues from 1989 to 1991, plus an annual and a Justice Machine crossover in 1990. The regular series was followed by four issues of Hero Alliance Quarterly released from 1991 to 1992, and the series concluded with a Hero Alliance Special in 1992.

In the early 1990s, Campiti published a newsletter announcing that further adventures of Hero Alliance would be published by Extreme Studios and drawn by Glass House Graphics artists, but no comics ensued.

== Characters ==
=== Hero Alliance ===
Victor: A character similar to Superman, he withdraws from the Guardsmen when he becomes disappointed by the new membership's lack of heroic standards. He regards the Golden Guardsman as his mentor and role model, and after the current Guardsmen are all killed, his guilt at writing them off leads him to try to establish a similar mentoring role over the less experienced and powerful heroes all around him. In his secret identity, he is the owner of a chain of fitness centers and a former bodybuilding champion.

Kris (Golden Guard): Daughter of the original Golden Guardsman, she inherits his superhuman strength and is targeted for murder by her brother, jealous that she had inherited powers and he apparently hadn't. Although she adopts a version of her father's costume early on she takes a while to adopt a version of his pseudonym, superheroing for a while just as "Kris".

Sentry: A Batman pastiche, he keeps his powers (or lack thereof) a secret.

Hover: A telekinetic who loses the use of his legs in action and has to fly to get around outside of a wheelchair.

Tawny Winters: An empath, her appearance alters to become the perfect woman for everyone who sees her.

Gossamer: A woman with the power of intangibility over herself and anyone with whom she has contact.

Gemini +: A pair of identical twins who possess super strength shared between them, and a force field that operates only when they are in close proximity to each other; it is their capture of Sepulchre and the unimpressed reactions of the other heroes to their feat that leads to Sepulchre's confession to having killed the Guardsmen. Bob is an obnoxious loudmouth, and his brother Steve is apologetic for Bob's behavior.

=== Antagonists ===
Sepulchre: Self-confessed murderer of the Guardsmen (by planting bombs in their headquarters), Sepulchre is up until that point regarded as a minor, easily defeated villain. He is later revealed as a knife-wielding serial killer who has never been caught.

Apostate: Growing up apparently without powers, Kris's brother develops a resentment against his father and sister because his father lavished attention on his presumed successor as a superhero. He steals his father's helmet, which apparently has electrical powers, and uses it to kill the old retired superhero, as well as another randomly encountered hero named Predator, and tries to kill his sister and Victor. He later learns his electrical powers are innate and the helmet is simply a psychological crutch.

StarCorp Man is sponsored by a major corporation. Out of ethical concerns, his abilities are linked to an "empathic limiter" that causes him to experience pain equal (or at least proportional) to any he inflicts using these granted powers, to encourage restraint. This control method backfires when he begins to develop a psychological addiction to the induced sensations.

== Bibliography ==
- Pied Piper Graphic Album #1 — Hero Alliance (a.k.a. Hero Alliance: The End of the Golden Age) TPB (Pied Piper Comics, Dec 1986)
- Hero Alliance vol. 1, #1 (Wonder Comics, 1987)
- Hero Alliance: The End of the Golden Age #1–3 (Innovation Publishing, 1989)
- Hero Alliance vol. 2, #1–17 (Innovation, 1989–1991)
- Hero Alliance Annual #1 (Innovation, 1990)
- Hero Alliance & Justice Machine: Identity Crisis #1 (Innovation, 1990)
- Innovation Spectacular #1 (Innovation, 1991) — featuring Hero Alliance
- Sentry Special #1 (Innovation, 1991) — featuring Hero Alliance's Sentry
- Hero Alliance Quarterly #1–4 (Innovation, 1991–1992)
- Hero Alliance Special #1 (Innovation, 1992)
