= Eternity Comics =

Comic book publisher

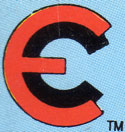
- Industry: Comics
- Founded: 1986; 40 years ago
- Defunct: 1994; 32 years ago
- Headquarters: Newbury Park, California, U.S.
- Key people: Scott Mitchell Rosenberg; Brian David-Marshall (vice president & publisher); Tony Eng
- Owner: Marvel Comics (from 1994)
- Parent: Malibu Comics (from 1988)

Eternity Comics was an American comic book publisher active from 1986 to 1994, first as an independent publisher, then as an imprint of Malibu Comics. Eternity published creator-owned comics of an offbeat, independent flavor, as well as some licensed properties. One of its most notable titles was Ex-Mutants. Eternity was also notable for reprinting foreign titles, and introducing Cat Claw, The Jackaroo, and the Southern Squadron to the U.S. market.

Creators such as Brian Pulido, Evan Dorkin, Dale Berry, Ben Dunn, Dean Haspiel, and Ron Lim got their starts with Eternity.

== History ==
=== Origins ===
Eternity began publishing in 1986 in Newbury Park, California, privately financed by comics distributor Scott Mitchell Rosenberg, and helmed by Brian David-Marshall and Tony Eng.

The company debuted with such titles as Earthlore, Gonad the Barbarian, The Mighty Mites, Ninja, and Reign of the Dragonlord (with only Ninja lasting more than a couple of issues).

In April 1987, The Comics Journal revealed that Eternity — along with publishers Malibu Comics, Amazing Comics, Wonder Color, and Marshall's own Imperial Comics — had been financed by Rosenberg. After this was made public, Rosenberg discontinued most of the publishers, keeping Malibu and retaining the Eternity label as a Malibu imprint. Eternity also took over publishing a number of Imperial Comics' titles, including Battle to the Death, Nazrat, and Probe. In late 1988, Rosenberg also brought in Canadian publisher Aircel Comics under the Eternity/Malibu umbrella.

=== Robotech ===
One of Eternity's most successful titles was its 1988–1994 licensing of the Robotech franchise. The creators, the Waltrip brothers, began with direct adaptations of the Robotech II: The Sentinels scripts and novels, before eventually writing additional stories that expanded the canon beyond the initial 85 animated Robotech episodes and The Sentinels. As the series progressed, the Waltrips began deviating from the Sentinels novels, adding new story elements and new characters.

=== Legal battles ===
During its existence, Eternity was no stranger to legal squabbles. The popular title Ex-Mutants was first published by Eternity in 1987–1988, and was then moved to the independent black-and-white publisher Amazing Comics (with contractual problems later forcing the title to be published under Amazing's successor, Pied Piper Comics). A legal dispute followed, and after running out of money for the struggle, creators David Lawrence and Ron Lim surrendered: the title returned to Eternity and was later published in a revamped version by Malibu.

Eternity's 1989 publication of The Uncensored Mouse, which reprinted Mickey Mouse comics from the 1930s — without Disney's permission — led to a run-in with Walt Disney Productions. Eternity printed The Uncensored Mouse with totally black covers, bagged (to prevent casual buyers from flipping through the comic), and the inside of the comic had a printed notice: "Mickey Mouse is a registered trademark of Walt Disney Productions" so as not to confuse the market that it was an authorized Disney production. Eternity believed it had not violated any copyrights because strips had fallen into public domain. Regardless, Disney brought a lawsuit against the company and the series was cancelled after just two issues (six issues were solicited).

Similarly, Eternity's 1989-1992 adaptation of the popular Japanese manga Captain Harlock was discontinued after it was discovered that Eternity/Malibu did not have the Captain Harlock rights. The alleged representative for the rights to Harlock to whom Malibu paid money, claiming to represent Coral Pictures, turned out to be fraudulent and was in no way connected to the actual rights holders.

=== Decline and acquisition by Marvel ===
Malibu stopped using the Eternity imprint before Marvel acquired Malibu, when Eternity's last two franchises moved to other publishers in the middle of 1994: Ninja High School returning to Antarctic Press and Robotech moving to Academy Comics.

== Titles ==
- Apache Dick (1990)
- The argonauts
- Battle armor (1988-1989, 3 isues)
- Blade of Shuriken by Reggie Byers
  - Shuriken team-up
  - Shuriken: cold steel
  - Shuriken
- Borderguard (1987)
- Cat Claw (1990–1991) – translation of Serbian comic
- Captain Harlock, by Robert W. Gibson, and illustrated by Ben Dunn & Tim Eldred (1989–1992, 13 isues)
- Cosmic Heroes (1988–1990)
- Dark Wolf (1988–1989)
- Dan Turner, Hollywood Detective, stories by Robert Leslie Bellem, adapted by John Wooley
- Dinosaurs for Hire by Tom Mason (1988–1990)
  - Dinosaurs for Hire 3D
  - Dinosaurs for Hire fall classic
- Earthlore (1986)
- Evil Ernie by Brian Pulido (1991–1992)
- Ex-Mutants, by David Lawrence and Ron Lim (1987–1988)
- Fright (1988–1989)
- The Futurians by Dave Cockrum (reprint, 1987)
- Gonad the Barbarian (1986)
- Gundam 0083
- I Love Lucy
- Invisoworld by Gary Dunaier
- The Jackaroo (1990)
- Lensman by E. E. Smith (1990)
- Metal Bikini
- The Mighty Mites by John Nubbin and Nicholas Conti (1986–1987)
- Ninja (1986–1988)
- Ninja Funnies by Dale Berry
- Original Tom Corbett, Space Cadet (1990)
- The Phantom of the Opera (1988)
- Pirate Corp$ / Hectic Planet by Evan Dorkin (1987–1988) (later published by Slave Labor Graphics from 1989-1993)
- Plan 9 from Outer Space: Thirty Years Later! – billed as an unofficial sequel to the original film.
- The Puppet Master
- Reign of the Dragonlord
- Robotech, by Jason and John Waltrip (1988–1994, picked up by Academy Comics)
- Scarlet in Gaslight written by Martin Powell (1987–1988)
- Scimidar by Rob Davis (1988)
- Southern Squadron: Freedom of Information Act (from Aircel)
- Spicy Tales (1988–1990)
- The Three Stooges: The Knuckleheads Return (1989)
- Tiger-X by Ben Dunn
- Triple Action (1993, anthology comic; contains three stories: Gigantor, Amazon Gazonga, and Armored Road Police.)
- The Trouble with Girls (1987–1988, later picked up by Malibu and then Comico)
- Twilight Avenger by John Wooly and Terry Tidwell
- The Verdict by Martin Powell and Dean Haspiel (1987–1988; continued by Malibu 1988–1989)
- The Uncensored Mouse (1989)
- Victims
- War of the Worlds
- Werewolf at large
- White Devil (1990–1991, 6 isues)
- Wild Knights (1988-1989 10 isues)
- Witch (1989)
- Yakuza (1987–1988)
- Zillion (1993)
