= David Lawrence (writer) =

American comics writer

David Lawrence is an American writer most notable for his work in comics.

== Early career in comics ==
Lawrence began working professionally in the field in the mid-1980s with a number of super hero and post-apocalyptic themes for Eternity Comics, Amazing and Pied Piper Comics. His most successful series was Ex-Mutants, which he co-created with artist Ron Lim. Ex-Mutants spawned several spin-off series, none of which achieved the same level of popularity. These included The New Humans, Wild Knights and Solo Ex-Mutants. He also wrote for several super-hero series at Innovation Comics, including Justice Machine and Hero Alliance. He was co-creator of the series Lunatic Fringe.

== Current ==
Lawrence is currently the managing editor of Dabel Brothers Publishing. Current projects include overseeing adaptations of Jim Butcher's Dresden Files and Robert Jordan's The Wheel of Time and a new adventure in George RR Martin's Wild Cards series. He is also scripting Mercy Thompson: Homecoming along with novelist Patricia Briggs, and Cry Wolf, another Briggs adaptation. In talking about the comic, Lawrence says, Cry Wolf is the first novel in Patty's Alpha and Omega series. The series takes its name from Charles Cornick, an Alpha, who is the son of the Marrok and is his right-hand man. Anna Latham is the Omega. She was turned into a werewolf against her will under orders of the rogue leader of a Chicago wolf pack."
