= Millennium Publications =

Defunct American comic book publishing company

- Founded: 1990
- Founder: Mark Ellis, Melissa Martin, Paul Davis
- Defunct: 2000
- Country of origin: U.S.
- Headquarters location: Tampa, Florida, then Narragansett, Rhode Island
- Distribution: U.S.
- Publication types: Comics
- Imprints: Borderland; American Bios; Modern Comics

Millennium Publications was an American independent comic book publishing company active in the 1990s.

Initially known as a publisher of licensed properties, Millennium adapted works by Arthur Conan Doyle, Lester Dent, Robert E. Howard, Harlan Ellison, H.P. Lovecraft, and Anne Rice; and even adapted television series like The Man from U.N.C.L.E. and The Wild Wild West into comic book form. The company expanded its repertoire of horror comics into original titles in the mid-1990s, and further branched out in its later years to embrace the alternative comics genre, starting a short-lived creator-owned imprint called Modern Comics.

Millennium gave early exposure to comics artists such as Darryl Banks, Brian Michael Bendis, Dean Haspiel, Adam Hughes, Michel Lacombe, David W. Mack, Josh Neufeld, Rik Levins, and Mike Wieringo; and utilized industry veterans like John Bolton, Mark Buckingham, Don Heck, Kelley Jones, Jim Mooney, Rudy Nebres, Steve Stiles, and Roy Thomas. Covers were occasionally provided by such notable creators as Brian Stelfreeze, Timothy Truman, and Doug Wildey.

The company was distinctive in that it mostly published one-shots and limited series, with only a couple of their titles running for more than four issues. In many ways representative of the boom period of independent comic book publishing, Millennium thrived in the early years of the 1990s and fell on lean times as the decade came to a close.

== Publishing history ==
=== Origins ===
Millennium Publications was founded in 1990 in Tampa, Florida, by Mark Ellis, Melissa Martin, and Paul Davis, with veteran comics creator Ellis serving as chief writer, and his wife Melissa as vice-president and art director. Co-founder Davis also edited a number of titles, especially in the period 1993 to 1995.

The company's first offerings, in 1990, were the series Anne Rice's The Mummy, inspired by her novel, The Mummy, or Ramses the Damned, with contributions from the likes of Ellis, John Hebert, Mark Menendez, and Jim Mooney, among others. The Mummy ran 12 issues in all, making it the company's longest-running title. Also published in 1990 was The Wild Wild West: The Night of the Iron Tyrants, a four-issue "sequel" to the TV series written by Ellis with art by Darryl Banks, and John Hebert with color art by Melissa Ellis and Deirdre DeLay.

In 1991, Millennium debuted a series of comics titles featuring Lester Dent's Doc Savage, featuring work by Ellis, Banks, Mike Wieringo, Tony Harris, Adam Hughes, Brian Stelfreeze, Steve Stiles, and Doug Wildey, among others. Ellis wrote the four-issue limited series Doc Savage: The Monarch of Armageddon, penciled by Darryl Banks, which was assessed by The Comics Buyer's Guide Catalog of Comic Books as coming the "closest to the original, capturing all the action, humanity, and humor of the original novels".

Also in 1991, Ellis conceived and scripted the critically acclaimed Nosferatu: Plague of Terror, a four-part series that provided a complete story of the title character's origin quite apart from the Dracula legend, featuring art by Rik Levins and Richard Pace. Finally, Ellis again turned to adapting and expanding another writer's concepts (H.P. Lovecraft), with the three-issue limited series Cthulhu: The Whisperer in Darkness, which featured the first appearance of the Miskatonic Project with art by Darryl Banks and Don Heck.

In 1992-93, Millennium introduced another Anne Rice-related project, Anne Rice's The Witching Hour, which ran for five issues, the first four of which were co-published with Comico: The Comic Company. The title was intended to run 13 issues but only made it to issue #5 before being canceled.

The company's three-issue Asylum horror anthology (published under its Borderland emblem) included reprints of Archie Comics' 1970s Red Circle Sorcery series, and featured the talents of Vicente Alcazar, John Bolton, T. Casey Brennan, Mark Buckingham, Howard Chaykin, Duncan Eagleson, Neil Gaiman, Pia Guerra, Don Hillsman II, Matt Howarth, Carlos Pino, and Al McWilliams, among others.

In addition, again with Ellis as scripter, Millennium adapted the cult classic horror film It! The Terror from Beyond Space into comics form. Ellis and Banks teamed up again to produce two issues of Justice Machine, a superhero title that had previously been published by Comico Comics and Innovation Publishing, among others.

During this period, Millennium also published its first nonfiction title, Don Hillsman II and Ryan Monihan's By Any Means Necessary: The Life and Times of Malcolm X, an unauthorized biography in comic book form. Before leaving Millennium at the end of 1993, Ellis once again flexed his adaptation skills with The Man from U.N.C.L.E.: The Birds of Prey Affair two-parter.

=== Ownership transition and relocation ===
At the end of 1993, co-owners Ellis and Martin, who also functioned as the editorial and production staff, sold their shares in Millennium to Davis, but retained ownership of a number of comics properties, such as Nosferatu, The Miskatonic Project, and the new Justice Machine. When Ellis and Martin left Millennium, Davis moved the company headquarters from Tampa to Rhode Island, first to Narragansett, and finally to Kingston.

=== Transition from licensed properties to original material ===
The mid-1990s saw the company publishing more original material, still mostly in the horror vein, though it also published adaptations of material created by Robert E. Howard (The Black Reaper) and Arthur Conan Doyle (The Lost World). The Black Reaper was notable in that it featured Howard's poetry alongside illustrations by comic book artists; it was halfway between a book and a comic book. During this period, Millennium also picked up Wendy Snow-Lang's Night's Children series from the defunct Fantaco/Tundra.

In 1994, Millennium acquired Arvin Loudermilk and Mike Iverson's Vigil from Innovation Publishing, first collecting material originally published by Innovation, and then launching its own line of Vigil limited series. These ran through 1996.

In 1996, Millennium also debuted Dean Haspiel and Josh Neufeld's eclectic two-man anthology Keyhole, which ran for three issues in 1996-1997 (until it moved over to Millennium's Modern Comics imprint for issue #4; Keyhole then was picked up by Top Shelf Productions for the remainder of its six-issue run).

=== Modern Comics creator-owned imprint ===
1997 was notable in that Millennium debuted its creator-owned line, Modern Comics, which featured creators from the minicomic, self-publishing, and zine scenes. This new direction for the company didn't help their fortunes, however, as in 1998 Millennium/Modern only published a handful of comics. The company didn't release any comics in 1999, and Modern's only title in 2000 was Yvonne Mojica's The Bathroom Girls Guide to Christmas Chaos.

=== Closure ===
In 2000, Millennium/Modern closed its doors for good.

== Millennial Concepts ==
In late 2007, Ellis and Martin formed Millennial Concepts, reviving the stylized "M" that had served as Millennium's first company logo. In July 2008, Millennial Concepts joined forces with Caliber Comics founder Gary Reed's Transfuzion Publications in a joint graphic novel-publishing venture.

== Titles ==
Doug Wildey's cover for Doc Savage: The Man of Bronze #2.

=== Licensed properties ===
- Anne Rice's The Mummy a.k.a. The Mummy, or Ramses the Damned (12 issues, 1990–1992) — anthology with stories by Mark Ellis, Mary Anne-Cassata, Greg Fulton, Terry Collins, and Faye Perozich, and art by Tony Harris, John Hebert, Mark Herbert, Mario Hernandez, Robert Lewis, Mark Menendez, Richard Pace, Jim Mooney, and Marcus Rollie
- Anne Rice's the Witching Hour (5 issues, 1992–1993; the first four issues co-published with Comico) — by Terry Collins, Faye Perozich, and Duncan Eagleson
- Anne Rice's the Witching Hour: the Beginning (1994)
- Collector's Dracula (2 issues, 1994) — reprinting Dracula stories originally published by Millennium, Eclipse Comics, and Caliber Comics
- Doc Savage: The Man of Bronze (9 issues, 1991–1992) — anthology with stories by Mark Ellis, Terry Collins, and Charles Moore; and art by Darryl Banks, Scott Benefiel, Nick Choles, Dave Dorman, Mark Evans, Tony Harris, Adam Hughes, Paul Orban, Brian Stelfreeze, Steve Stiles, Doug Wildey, Jim Amash, Rick Davis, and Robert Lewis
- Doc Savage: The Man of Bronze — Devil's Thoughts (3 issues, 1992)
- Doc Savage: The Man of Bronze — Doom Dynasty (2 issues, 1991–1992) — art by Mike Wieringo
- Doc Savage: The Man of Bronze — Repel (1991)
- Doc Savage: The Manual of Bronze (2 issues, 1992) — by Mark Ellis and Darryl Banks
- Doc Savage: The Monarch of Armageddon (4 issues, 1992) — by Mark Ellis and Darryl Banks
- H. P. Lovecraft's Cthulhu (3 issues, 1991–1992) — written by Terry Collins and Paul Davis with art by Don Heck and Robert Lewis
- H.P. Lovecraft's Cthulhu: The Festival (3 issues, 1993-1994) — by Roy Thomas, Brian Michael Bendis, and David W. Mack
- H. P. Lovecraft's Cthulhu: Whisperer in Darkness (3 issues, 1991–1992) — written by Mark Ellis and Terry Collins, with art by Darryl Banks and Don Heck
- It! The Terror from Beyond Space (4 issues, 1992) — written by Mark Ellis with inks by Jim Amash
- The Lost World (2 issues, 1996)
- The Man from U.N.C.L.E.: The Birds of Prey Affair (2 issues, 1993) — by Mark Ellis, Nick Choles, and Don Hillsman II
- Mummy Archives (1992) — text stories by Terry Collins, Paul Davis, Mark Ellis, and Mary Anne-Cassata with illustrations
- Nosferatu: Plague of Terror (4 issues, 1991) — by Mark Ellis, Rik Levins, Richard Pace, and Frank Turner
- Pat Savage: Woman of Bronze (1991) — one-shot with stories by Mark Ellis and art by Darryl Banks, Scott Benefiel, Mark Evans, Adam Hughes, Pat Savage, Jim Amash, and Robert Lewis
- Robert E. Howard's The Black Reaper (1995)
- Weird Tales Illustrated (2 issues, Jan. 1992) — anthology with stories by Les Daniels, Paul Davis, and Faye Perozich, with art by John Bolton, Kelley Jones, and Eddy Newell
- The Wild Wild West: The Night of the Iron Tyrants (4 issues, 1990) — co-written by Paul Davis and Mark Ellis with art by Robert Lewis

=== Original titles ===
- After Dark (1995) — by Kim Elizabeth, Wendy Snow-Lang, Arvin Loudermilk, Mike Iverson, Faye Perozich, and Julio Brazo
- Armageddon Rising: The Grand Equation (2 issues, 1997)
- Asylum (3 issues, 1993) — anthology with original stories and reprints by T. Casey Brennan, Marv Channing, Paul Davis, Eric Dinehart, David Ingersoll, and Neil Gaiman, with art by Vicente Alcazar, John Bolton, Mark Buckingham, Howard Chaykin, Duncan Eagleson, Pia Guerra, Don Hillsman II, Matt Howarth, Justin Norman, Omaha Perez, Carlos Pino, Mari Schaal, and Al McWilliams
- Blood Childe: Blood Radio (3 issues, c. 1994–1995)
- Blood Childe: Portrait of a Surreal Killer (4 issues, Oct. 1994-1995) — by Neil Gaiman (story), Faye Perozich (story and script), Yanick Paquette, Michel Lacombe, and Octavio Cariello and Michel Lacombe
- By Any Means Necessary: The Life and Times of Malcolm X (an Unauthorized Biography in Comic Book Form) (1993) — by Don Hillsman II and Ryan Monihan
- Canton Kid (1997)
- Captain Satan (2 issues, 1994)
- Chassis (3 issues, 1996–1997; acquired by Hurricane Comics) — by Darryl Taylor and William O'Neill
- Cleopatra (1991–1992) — art by Mark Mendendez
- Da'Kota (2 issues, 1997) — by T. C. Howards, Scott Petersen, and Terry Pavlet
- Dark World: Vampires (1995) — by Kim Elizabeth, David Quinn, and Sandra Chang
- Death Hawk (1991) — penciling by Darryl Banks
- Deiree: The Ultimate Experience (1997) — by Naser Subashi and Rudy Nebres
- Descending Angels (1995) — pencils by Adam De Kraker
- Heartstopper: Sorrow About to Fall (2 issues, 1995) — by Steven Roman, Uriel Caton, and Alan Larsen
- Jigaboo Devil (1996) — by LaMorris Richmond (credited as L. A. Morris), Barton McGee, Jiba Molei Anderson, and Seitu Hayden
- The Justice Machine: Chimera Conspiracy (2 issues, 1992) — by Mark Ellis and Darryl Banks
- Keyhole (3 issues, June 1996-1997 before moving to Modern^{see below}) — mostly by Dean Haspiel and Josh Neufeld
- Little Miss Strange (1997)
- Manik (3 issues, 1995) — by Mitchell Reichgut and Ben Fogletto
- Nanosoup (1996)
- Night's Children: Liaisons (Oct. 1994) — by Wendy Snow-Lang
- Night's Children: Origins (Sept. 1994; property acquired from FantaCo Enterprises)
- Night's Children: Red Trails West (Dec. 1994)
- Night's Children: Ripper (2 issues, 1995) — by Wendy Snow-Lang
- Oz Squad Special (1995) — by Steve Ahlquist, Gus Norman, David Ingersoll, and Ronn Sutton
- Power Plays (1 issue, 1995; planned as four issues) — by Michael Kelly and Wendi Strang-Frost
- The Quest of the Tiger Woman: A Genetic Park Adventure (2 issues, Apr. 1994)
- Red Moon (2 issues, 1995) — written by Paul Davis
- Sex & Death (June 1995) — art by Terry Pavlet
- Shock the Monkey (2 issues, 1996)
- Song of the Sirens: featuring Da'Kota (2 issues, 1997)
- Sparrow (4 issues, 1994)
- Tempered Steele (1992) — art by Don Hillsman II
- The Tiger Woman (Sept. 1994) — by Donald Marquez
- The Tiger Woman: A New Beginning (1998) — by Donald Marquez
- Trouble (1998)
- Vampyr (4 issues, c. 1994)
- Vigil: Desert Foxes (2 issues, 1995)
- Vigil: Rebirth (2 issues, 1994)
- Vigil: Road Trips (1996) — by Arvin Loudermilk and Mike Iverson
- Vigil: Vamporum Animaturi (1994) — by Arvin Loudermilk and Mike Iverson
- Wicked a.k.a. Sean Shaw's Wicked (4 issues, 1994–1995) — by Sean Shaw
- White Eyes (1992) — written by Mark Ellis

=== Modern Comics imprint ===
- August Quinn Adventures (1998) — written by Chris Reilly
- Bathroom Girls (4 issues, 1998–2000) — by Yvonne Mojica
- The Bathroom Girls Guide to Holiday Chaos (2000) — by Yvonne Mojica
- Billy Dogma (3 issues, 1997) — by Dean Haspiel
- Keyhole #4 (1997) — by Dean Haspiel and Josh Neufeld; acquired by Top Shelf Productions
- Lovely Prudence (3 issues, 1997–1998) — by Maze
- Lovely Prudence Swimsuit Special (1998) — by Maze
- Rogue Satellite Comics Special (1998) — by Chris Reilly (credited as Christopher P. Reilly), Kevin Atkinson, and R. David Price

=== Trade paperbacks ===
- The Best of Asylum (1994) — collecting material from the three-issue limited series
- H.P. Lovecraft's Cthulhu: Whisperer in Darkness (1993) — collecting the three-issue limited series
- Vigil Collection I: Fall from Grace (1994) — collects Vigil: Fall From Grace issues #1–2, published by Innovation Publishing in 1992
- Vigil Collection II: The Mexico Trilogy (Oct. 1994) — collects Vigil: The Golden Parts (Innovation, 1992), Vigil: Kukulkan (Innovation, 1993), and Vigil: Vamporum Animaturi (Millennium, 1994)

== Notable creators published by Millennium ==
- Tony Akins
- Darryl Banks
- Brian Michael Bendis
- John Bolton
- Mark Buckingham
- Duncan Eagleson
- Mark Ellis
- Tony Harris
- Dean Haspiel
- Don Heck
- Don Hillsman II
- Adam Hughes
- Michel Lacombe
- Jim Mooney
- Rudy Nebres
- Josh Neufeld
- Yanick Paquette
- David Quinn
- Mike Wieringo

== See also ==
- Innovation Publishing
