= Purge (comics) =

Purge, in comics, may refer to:

- Dark Horse Comics titles:
  - Purge (comic book), a Star Wars comic book
  - Purge, a one-shot based on Aliens
- Marvel Comics characters:
  - Purge, a Marvel UK character and member of the Bacillicons from the series Digitek
  - Purge, a character from X-Treme X-Men
- DC Comics characters:
  - Purge, a robot fought that fought Superman and was built by Intergang
  - Purge, a character who appeared in the series Gunfire

== See also ==
- Purge (disambiguation)
