= Adam Hughes =

American comics artist and illustrator (born 1967)

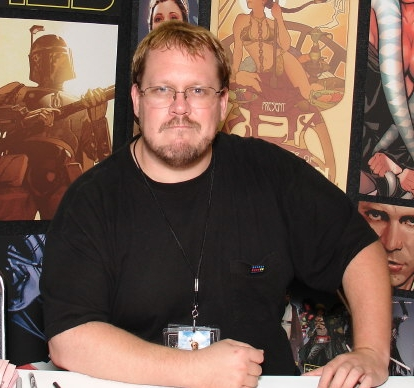
- Adam Hughes in June 2007
- Born: May 5, 1967 (age 59) Riverside Township, New Jersey, U.S.
- Areas: Writer, Penciller, Inker
- Notable works: Wonder Woman, Catwoman
- Awards: Eisner Award for Best Single Issue/One-Shot (2018)

Adam Hughes (born May 5, 1967) is an American comics artist and illustrator best known to American comic book readers for his renderings of pinup-style female characters, and his cover work on titles such as Wonder Woman and Catwoman. He is known as one of comics' foremost cheesecake artists, and one of the best known and most distinctive comic book cover artists. Throughout his career Hughes has provided illustration work for companies such as DC Comics, Marvel Comics, Dark Horse Comics, Lucasfilm, Warner Bros. Pictures, Playboy magazine, Joss Whedon's Mutant Enemy Productions, and Sideshow Collectibles. He is also a fixture at comics conventions where his commissioned sketches command long lines.

== Early life ==
Adam Hughes was born on May 5, 1967 in Riverside Township, New Jersey and grew up in Florence, where he attended a private elementary school. He stayed in Florence until he was 24.

== Career ==
=== Early work ===
Hughes, who had no formal training in art, began his career in 1987. His first comic book work was a pinup in Eagle #6. He penciled, inked, and lettered, two short stories and the first issue of Death Hawk, created by Mark Ellis. In 1988 Hughes became the penciller on writer Mike W. Barr's detective series Maze Agency, as his portfolio bore samples of both that series and Mike Gustovich's Justice Machine. Maze Agency, published by Comico, and edited by Michael Eury, became Hughes' first regular series and his first color work. Despite wanting to draw action-oriented superhero stories at the time, he credits his work on Maze Agency, whose scripts Barr composed in the full script format, with improving his skill and confidence at storytelling. In a 2004 interview, he stated that this work also developed his preference for character-oriented stories over action-oriented ones, both as an artist and a writer. Hughes' interior pencils were inked by Eury's longtime friend Rick Magyar, and because Hughes aspired to ink his own work one day, he took Barr's suggestion that he produce pinups on each issue's back cover as an advertisement for the next issue to practice inking his own pencils. It was around this time that Hughes switched to inking with a brush on the advice of Dave Stevens when Stevens looked at Hughes' samples. Hughes stayed on the series for a year, though he took a month off during this run to provide the pencils on Comico's issue #12 of Bill Willingham's series Elementals.

After two years of providing background art or interior pencils on independent books, writer/artist Willingham introduced Hughes to Andy Helfer, the editor on the DC Comics series Justice League America. Helfer was impressed by Hughes' portfolio and asked Hughes to contact him when his contract expired. A few months later, after Comico went out of business, Helfer contacted Hughes, hiring him initially to draw inventory covers for issues like Mister Miracle #19, one of Hughes' favorite creations by Jack Kirby. Hughes was then made the regular artist on Justice League America, with issue #31 being his first published DC Comics work. At the time he began on that book, he was still working at a comics shop two days a week. He continued doing covers and interior art on the title for two years, before switching to providing covers only.

In February 1992, at the age of 24, Hughes moved to Atlanta, Georgia and helped found Gaijin Studios, believing that working more closely alongside fellow artists would improve his own skills. Hughes stayed with Gaijin Studios for 12 years. That same year, he penciled Comics' Greatest World: Arcadia #3 for Dark Horse Comics, which featured the first appearance of the supernatural character Ghost. He drew that character subsequently in the 1994 one-shot Ghost Special. When that character was given her own series in 1995, Hughes penciled the first three-issue storyline, "Arcadia Nocturne".

From 1994 to 1995, Hughes drew the satirical storyline "Young Captain Adventure", which appeared in the first several issues of the adult comics anthology magazine Penthouse Comix. Hughes also provided a painted cover for issue #2, and a pinup in issue #26 in 1997. In a 2011 interview, he indicated that while he did not regret that work, he felt shame at the time he produced it, as he feared it might end his future prospects with companies like Marvel Comics and DC Comics, and because he feels that depicting full nudity is less fulfilling than merely suggestive art. Hughes explains:

I firmly believe that drawing a fully clothed, beautiful woman is more sensuous than a completely naked, laying on a table getting ready to go in for a CAT scan. I firmly think that it's what you hint and suggest—that is more attractive—and that goes for both men and women. When you go into full nudity, and swing for the fences with the nudity, it can be titillating at first, but after a while you get kind of tired and kind of spent and decide "Hey, you know what, I am just going to go watch the ball game." I think that you need to have the mystery, and that layer to be peeled away so that the interest remains there.

In 1995, Hughes wrote and illustrated the 1996 two-issue miniseries, Gen^{13}: Ordinary Heroes from WildStorm, his first writing assignment. Because he did that at the WildStorm offices in La Jolla, California, he spent evenings in the suite where the studio's books were colored, where he learned how to color with Photoshop from colorists Homer Reyes, Ben Dimagmaliw and Laura Martin.

In late 1998, Hughes began a four-year run as cover artist on DC's Wonder Woman; he produced 49 covers for the series. He also provided cover art on Tomb Raider from Top Cow Comics. Hughes would eventually gain a reputation as one of the best-known and distinctive comic book cover artists.

=== 2000s ===
When Wizards of the Coast created their 2000 d20-based Star Wars RPG, Hughes created designs for both the original and revised core rulebooks, as well as the Star Wars: Invasion of Theed adventure game mini-RPG. When he reused his portrait of the Jedi guardian, Sia-Lan Wezz (his favorite character), for the cover of the 2005 one-shot Star Wars: Purge as a gag, there was such editorial interest that she was written into the story as one of Darth Vader's early victims.

In May 2007, Sideshow Collectibles debuted a miniature statuette of Mary Jane Watson, a perennial love interest of Spider-Man's, based on artwork by Hughes. The statue, which depicts Mary Jane wearing a cleavage-revealing T-shirt and low-cut jeans that expose the top of a pink thong while bending over a metal tub holding Spider-Man's costume, generated controversy among some fans who felt that the statue was sexist. Marvel addressed the matter by stating, "The Mary Jane statuette is the latest release in a limited edition collectibles line. The item is aimed at adults that have been long-time fans of the Marvel Universe. It is intended only for mature collectors and sold in specialty, trend, collectible and comic shops – not mass retail." Sideshow Collectibles stated, "Our product is not produced to make a political or social statement but is fashioned after entertainment properties currently in the market place (sic). We suggest that if you do find the Mary Jane product offensive that you refrain from viewing that web page." Elizabeth McDonald of girl-wonder.org, an organization dedicated to "high-quality character depiction" in the comics industry, was incredulous at the statue's design, though she stated, "Honestly, the difficulty with this statuette is that if you're a woman who likes comics, it's not even noteworthy. Many male comic fans can't understand the outrage it's generated, since this is fairly tame within the industry. This portrayal of Mary Jane could be considered superior to some in the industry, since her clothes don't seem to be actively falling off her". The Toronto Star's Malene Arpe echoed this, pointing to female characters with even more revealing appearances, such as Black Cat and Witchblade. Gary Susman of Entertainment Weekly lamented that the statuette was not issued some weeks earlier, so that it could have been included in the website 10 Zen Monkeys' list of "Ten Worst Spiderman Tie-Ins". Sideshow subsequently released several other statues, or "comiquettes", based on Hughes' depiction of other female Marvel characters, including Black Cat, She-Hulk, and various X-Men-related characters.

"Real Power of the DC Universe", a poster created by Hughes for the 2008 San Diego Comic-Con

In 2008, Hughes created a poster of major DC Comics female characters as a giveaway for that year's San Diego Comic-Con to promote the publisher's upcoming projects. The poster, called "Real Power of the DC Universe", features 11 female characters standing and/or sitting abreast of one another, similar to a Vanity Fair gatefold layout. Per DC's request, the characters are mostly clad in white outfits rather than their familiar superhero costumes. Hughes, wanting to avoid making the poster look like a bridal magazine layout, gave each outfit a different color temperature. He also gave each character a distinctive style. The garment worn by Wonder Woman resembles a Greek-style tunic, while the one worn by Poison Ivy features a floral trim. Because the Catwoman series was coming to an end, DC instructed Hughes to leave her off the poster. Hughes was fond of the character, so he drew her on the far left, figuring that he would edit her out of the final version. However, having seen his progress, DC's editorial team decided that they liked his version and told Hughes to include Catwoman. She is dressed in a black latex evening gown with a white shawl. Hughes reasoned that Selina would have been irritated by being included in the group at the last minute and thus wore the blackest ensemble she could out of spite. The poster's popularity resulted in requests for Hughes to create similar ones with men, Marvel characters, etc. It is one of the images for which Hughes has gained a reputation as one of comics' foremost cheesecake artists. About this status, Hughes has said:

I don't know if I embrace the term 'cheesecake artist'. I don't like hugging anything. Maybe I give the term a warm yet firm handshake? It's great to be known for being good for something, and it not being altogether infamous.

For an article by Hal Niedzviecki on the impact of blogs, social networks and reality television in the February 2009 Playboy magazine, Hughes illustrated a double-page spread depicting a group of voyeurs observing a topless woman in front of a computer.

=== 2010s ===
Catwoman by Adam Hughes on the cover of Catwoman vol. 3, #59 (November 2006)

Although Hughes was announced as the writer and artist on All Star Wonder Woman in 2006, he explained at the 2010 San Diego Comic-Con that that project was "in the freezer" for the time being, due to the difficulty involved in both writing and illustrating it himself. His website indicated that after the current Catwoman series ended with issue #82, he would cease his DC cover work, and would focus on producing the six-issue All Star Wonder Woman series, though he stated in an October 2010 interview with NJ.com, after the Catwoman assignment had concluded earlier that year, that All Star Wonder Woman was still on hold.

At the 2010 Chicago Comicon, editor Mark Chiarello offered him the art duties on the four-issue miniseries Before Watchmen: Dr. Manhattan, one of eight tie-in prequels to the seminal 1986–1987 miniseries Watchmen, which would be written by J. Michael Straczynski, and which would require Hughes to delay finishing All-Star Wonder Woman. Hughes accepted the job of drawing that miniseries, which was announced in February 2012, and premiered August 22, 2012. Hughes commented: "I love Alan Moore's canon of work, with special affection for Miracleman, The League of Extraordinary Gentlemen, and most definitely Watchmen. I hope to do some sort of justice to Dave Gibbons' brilliant art: he's one of the all time great illustrators ever to work in the field of comics...I'm fairly stoked to be working with the fabulous J. Michael Straczynski [sic] I loved his Thor run, especially. The man knows how to craft amazing tales, so I feel like you & I are in good hands."

Between 2009 and 2012, DC Collectibles produced a series of statues of various female DC characters that were based on Hughes' cover art called Cover Girls of the DC Universe. These included statues of Black Canary, Catwoman, Zatanna, Hawkwoman, Harley Quinn, Poison Ivy, Supergirl, and one of Wonder Woman based on Hughes' cover to Wonder Woman vol. 2 #150.

In 2010, DC Comics published Cover Run: The DC Comics Art of Adam Hughes, a collection of Hughes' cover work for that publisher, arranged chronologically, with commentary by Hughes on each selected cover, as well as preliminary sketches.

In 2014, "She Lies at Midnite", an eight-page Batman/Catwoman story written and illustrated by Hughes using greytones, appeared in the sixth and final issue of the anthology miniseries Batman: Black and White.

On July 20, 2016, Archie Comics published the first issue of Betty and Veronica, a three-issue miniseries written and illustrated by Hughes. In the series, best friends and rivals Betty Cooper and Veronica Lodge find themselves at odds over the fate of the town's hangout, Pop's Chocklit Shoppe, with the entire town divided on the matter. Hughes' intention was to make the characters timely and relevant; although Hughes has stated that he favors Betty, he has also said that "Veronica Lodge is delicious good fun to write."

On December 20, 2017 Dark Horse Comics published the 36-page Christmas special one-shot Hellboy: Krampusnacht, written by Hellboy creator Mike Mignola, and illustrated by Hughes. Although Hughes had previously done a Hellboy pinup in a Dark Horse anniversary comic, Krampusnacht marked Hughes' first time doing the interiors on a Hellboy story, and his first collaboration with Mignola. The book received mostly positive reviews. The following July, the book won the 2018 Eisner Award for Best Single Issue/One-Shot.

In January 2019, DC Comics' solicitations for April indicated that it would publish a new collection of Hughes' work called Absolute Art of Adam Hughes, which features the full content of Cover Run, plus more than 100 additional covers with new commentary by Hughes, and a reuse of the cover of Cover Run. The book's release date is November 13, 2019.

In April 2019, Marvel Comics announced that Hughes would provide the covers to the five-issue miniseries Invisible Woman, the first series to feature Sue Storm as the main character.

=== 2020s ===
In May 2022, Hughes and his wife and manager, Allison Sohn, stated during an online panel discussion that he was no longer producing comics art full time, as he was now doing character design and concept art for Marvel Studios Animation, for which Hughes was learning to use different graphics software. The non-disclosure agreement that he signed as part of the contract meant that he cannot not publicly share the work he produced when the projects are still in production, and that even though he is able to keep the original art he produces, his contract prohibits him from selling it.

In January 2023, it was reported that Hughes would be drawing an eight-page Rocketeer story written by Danny Bilson and Paul De Meo. The story would appear as one of the stories in a one-shot anthology, The Rocketeer, to be published by IDW Publishing. Hughes had been approached for the project by filmmakers Kelvin Mao and Robert Windom, who had discovered during production of their documentary, Dave Stevens: Drawn to Perfection, which focused on the creator of that character's creator, Dave Stevens, that Bilson and the late De Meo, who wrote the screenplay to the 1991 feature film adaptation The Rocketeer, had written an unpublished Rocketeer comics story guest-starring real-life aviation pioneer Amelia Earhart.

== Influences and approach ==
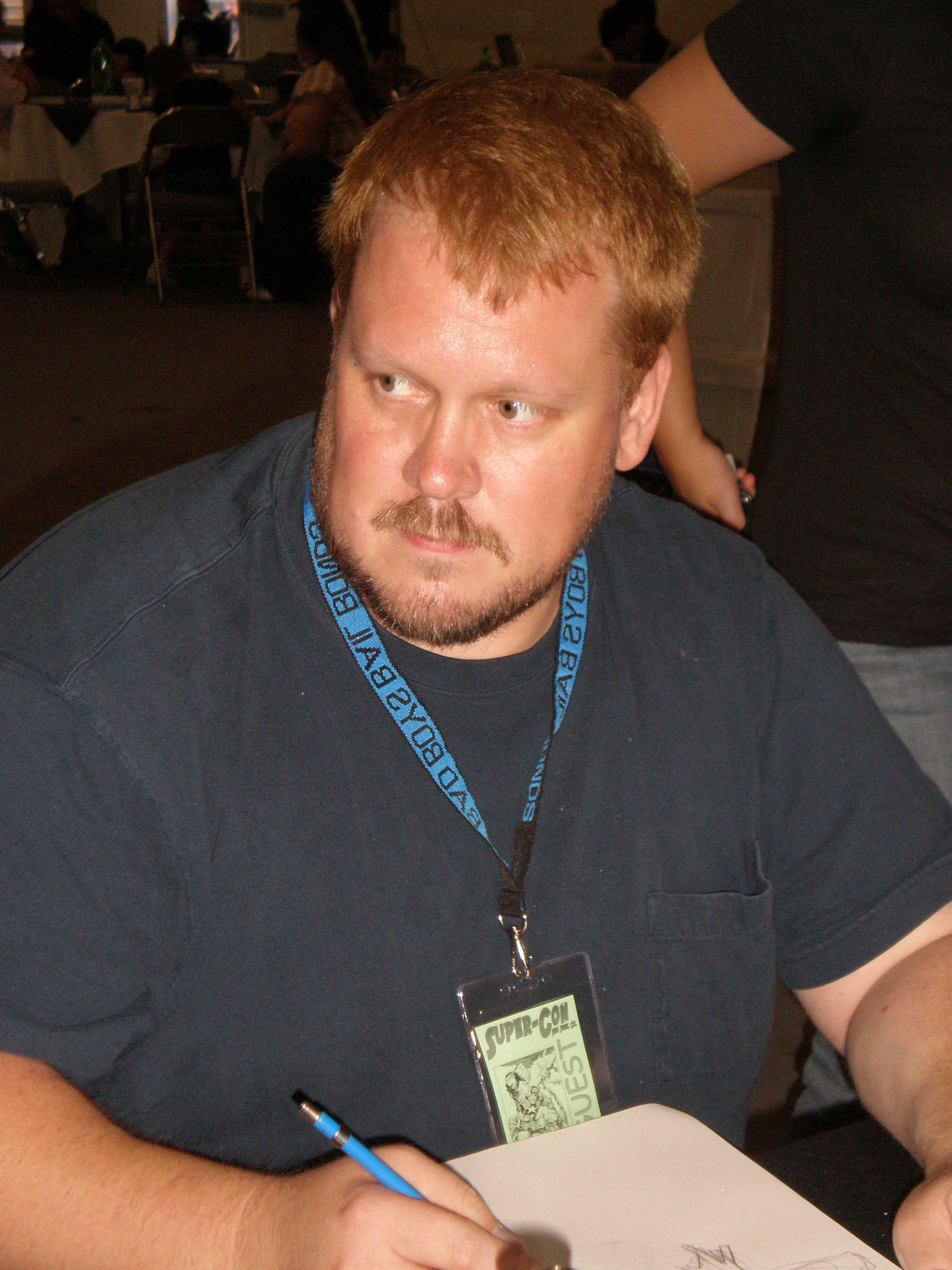
Hughes doing a convention sketch in May 2009

Hughes' artistic influences include comics artists such as Dave Stevens, Steve Rude, Mike Mignola and Kevin Nowlan, classic American illustrators such as Norman Rockwell, Maxfield Parrish, Drew Struzan and Dean Cornwell and notable pin-up artists like Alberto Vargas and George Petty. Hughes also keeps collections of works by Alphonse Mucha near his drawing table.

According to Hughes, he does not illustrate comics interiors on a regular basis because creating artwork whose quality satisfies him takes too much time for him to produce it on a regular monthly schedule; f while he is capable of working faster, he is typically dissatisfied with the results when he does so. As an example, he points to the 1996 miniseries he wrote and illustrated, Gen^{13}: Ordinary Heroes, which took him ten months to complete. He elaborated on this in a 2004 interview, explaining:

Storytelling is a lot of work, and to be a good storyteller is a lot of work because you have to pay attention to it. I think anybody with enough time under their belt can hack out a story. I think anybody can tell a safe story, or tell a story safely. You know, six panels, one head shot per page, that kind of thing. But to do it with any sort of style or creativity requires you to be on the ball all day long, and it's hard work. Whatever niche I occupy in comics right now, it's the goldfish filling the bowl that it's in. I can't do good storytelling and do it in a timely fashion, which is why nobody offers me stories any more. Any artist who does put out regular comics with interior stuff is a better man than me.

Hughes varies his style between projects, sometimes exhibiting a "cartoony" look in his drawings, and at other times employing reference to achieve a photorealistic work in his art, as in his work for Playboy magazine, in order to produce more varied works for his portfolio, should his prospects in the comic book industry ever fade. When given the freedom to illustrate what he wants for a cover, Hughes prefers not to depict action scenes, which he feels are his weak point, but the "pregnant" moments immediately before a climactic moment.

== Materials ==
The penciling process Hughes employs for his cover work is the same he uses when doing sketches for fans at conventions, with the main difference being that he does cover work in his sketchbook, before transferring the drawing to virgin art board with a lightbox. When penciling his convention drawings, Hughes prefers 11 x 14 Strathmore bristol vellum paper, because he prefers that paper's rougher surface. However, he uses smoother paper for brush inking, and he illustrated some Catwoman covers on animation paper. He does preliminary undersketches with a lead holder, because he feels regular pencils get worn down to the nub too quickly. As he explained during a sketch demonstration at a comic book convention, during this process he uses a Sanford Turquoise 4B lead, a soft lead, though when working at home in Atlanta, where the humid weather tends to dampen the paper, he sometimes uses a B lead or 2B lead, which acts like a 4B in that environment. However, his website explains that he uses 6B lead, with some variation. For pieces rendered entirely in pencil, he employs a variety of pencil leads of varying degrees of hardness. After darkening in the construction lines that he wishes to keep, he erases the lighter ones with a kneaded eraser before rendering greater detail. For more detailed erasures, he uses a pencil-shaped white eraser, and to erase large areas, he uses a larger, hand-held white eraser, which he calls a "thermonuclear eraser", because it "takes care of everything".

For inking, which is Hughes' least favorite part of the illustration process, he uses a size three Scharff brush and Dr. Ph. Martin's Black Star Hi-Carb ink. Hughes also favors Faber-Castell PITT artist pens, which come in a variety of points, including fine, medium, bold and brush tips, which Hughes uses for brush work on convention sketches. Though he stated in a 2006 interview that he favored PITT pens for convention sketches, but never for cover work, he later used them to illustrate the cover of ImagineFX magazine #67 in 2011, and for an illustration of Fire and Ice for a Justice League card game. He occasionally will use Copic markers in both warm and cool gray tones to render covers in grayscale. Similar to his penciling, Hughes tends to ink different portions of the sketch at random, though when rendering an attractive female, he begins with the face, so that in the event that he fails to capture her good looks, an entire rendered illustration has not been wasted. He uses Sharpie markers to fill in larger areas, which he feels would be too tedious to render in pencil, such as the costumes of characters like Batman, which he believes should be rendered in black rather than blue. He uses Photoshop to color his cover work. He initially colored his covers after inking them traditionally, but beginning with Wonder Woman (Vol 2) #195, he switched methods to one in which he renders the greyscale stage in pencil, pen and marker like a painting, and then uses Photoshop's Layer tool to colorize each element in the image separately.

Hughes sometimes uses colored markers to embellish parts of a convention sketch, as when he uses red for female characters' lips, or a silver pen to render scenes set in outer space. When rendering an entire sketch in grey tones or full color, Hughes, who once used Prismacolor or Design 2 markers, explained at the 2010 San Diego Comic-Con that for the past four years, he had been using Copic markers, a set of which a fan gave him as a gift, because Copic markers are refillable, and because he found that they produce longer-lasting colors, and can be used several times longer than other brands, as he was still using the same package of nibs as of August 2010 that came with the first set of Copics he was given four years previously. When using Copics, he takes care to erase his pencils, and to not work dark-to-light, because of the mottled effects that result from doing so. He has conducted demonstrations of Copic markers at conventions on a number of occasions.

== Personal life ==
Hughes and his wife, Allison Sohn, who designs his published sketchbooks and administrates his website, live in Atlanta.

On April 15, 2026, Sohn revealed on Hughes' website and official Facebook page that Hughes had Stage 3C colorectal cancer, which occurs when a tumor has grown deep into surrounding tissue, and possible spread to other parts of the body. Sohn stated that during a recent, successful biopsy, a large mass had been removed from Hughes' gastrointestinal tract, and that he would begin chemotherapy treatment. For this reason, Sohn explained, Hughes was canceling his upcoming appearance in New York, and all other appearances for the foreseeable future.

== Awards and recognition ==
- 2003 Eisner Award "Best Cover Artist"
- 2007 Inkpot Award
- February 2008 Inkwell Awards Ambassador (Feb. 2008–present)

== Bibliography ==
=== Interior art ===
==== Dark Horse Comics ====
- Comics' Greatest World: Ghost (1993)
- Dark Horse Presents #50: "Hip-Deep in the Consciousness Stream" (script and art, 1991)
- Ghost #1–3 (1995)
- Hellboy: Krampusnacht (2017)
- Hellboy and the B.P.R.D.: The Seven Wives Club (2020)

==== DC Comics ====
- 52 (DC Comics, 2006–2007):
  - "The Origin of Wonder Woman" (with Mark Waid, co-feature, in #12, 2006)
  - "The Origin of Power Girl" (with Mark Waid, co-feature, in #36, 2007)
- Before Watchmen: Doctor Manhattan, miniseries, #1–4 (2012–2013)
- Harley Quinn vol. 2 #0 (one page) (2014)
- Justice League America #31–35, 37–40, 43–44, 45 (four pages), #51 (1989–1991)
- Legionnaires #7 (full art), #9, #10, 12 (along with Chris Sprouse) (1993–1994)
- New Titans #93 (three pages) (1992)
- Star Trek: Debt of Honor (1992)
- Superman/Batman #75: "World's End...But Life Goes On" (script and art, DC Comics, 2010)
- Superman Gen^{13} #1–3 (script, with Lee Bermejo, Wildstorm, 2000)
- Team Titans #1 Redwing (1992)
- Titans Sell-out Special (three pages) (1992)

===== America's Best Comics =====
- Many Worlds of Tesla Strong (five pages) (2003) (America's Best Comics)

===== Vertigo =====
- The Dreaming #55 (two pages) (2000)
- Fables #100: "Celebrity Burning Questions" and #113 "In Those Days" (with Bill Willingham, Vertigo, 2011–2012)
- Fairest in All the Land HC (three pages) (2014)

===== Wildstorm =====
- Wildstorm Thunderbook: "WHAM! A Tale" (script and art, Wildstorm, one–shot, 2000)

==== Image Comics ====
- 24Seven vol.2: "The Sweetest Thing" (with Phil Hester, 2007)
- Gen^{13}: Ordinary Heroes #1–2 (script and art, 1996)
- Savage Dragon: Sex & Violence #1–2 (1997, layouts only)
- WildC.A.T.s/X-Men: The Modern Age (1997)

==== Marvel Comics ====
- Namor, the Sub-Mariner Annual #3 (four pages) (1993)
- Sensational She-Hulk #50 (two pages) (1993)
- X-Men Annual vol. 2 #1 (among other artists) (1992)

==== Other publishers ====
- Betty & Veronica #1–3 (2016) (Archie Comics)
- Blood of Dracula #4–5, 7–11 (1988–1989) (Apple Comics)
- Death Hawk #1 (1988) (Transfuzion Publishing)
- Eagle #9–12 (1987)
- Maze Agency #1–5, 8–9, 12; Annual #1 (1988–1990) (Comico Comics)
- Nexus vol. 2 #57 (1989) (First Comics)
- Pat Savage: the Woman of Bronze - Family Blood Special (1992)
- Penthouse Comix #1–5: "Young Captain Adventure" (with George Caragonne, Tom Thornton and Joel Adams, Penthouse, 1994–1995)
- Solution #5 (1994)
- Star Rangers #2–3 (1987)
- Warriors #1–3 (1987–1988)
- Wizard #94 (1999) (Wizard)

=== Cover work ===
==== DC Comics ====
- Batgirl #1–6, 29 (2011–2014)
- Catwoman vol. 3 #44–82 (2005–2008); #83 (2010, "Blackest Night" tie-in)
- DC Comics Presents (Julius Schwartz tribute):
  - Batman (2004)
  - Superman (2004)
- Fairest (2012–2014)
- Harley Quinn #1 variant (2013)
- JSA: Classified #1–2 (2005)
- Just Imagine Stan Lee creating:
  - Aquaman (2002)
  - Batman (2001)
  - Catwoman (2002)
  - Flash (2002)
  - Green Lantern (2001)
  - JLA (2002)
- Rose and Thorn miniseries #1–6 (2004)
- Superman #710 (DC Comics, 2011)
- Uncharted #1 (DC Comics, 2012)
- Wonder Woman (vol. 2) #139–146, 150–161, 164–174, 176–178, 184–197 (1998–2003)
- Zatanna #11, 13–16 (2011)

==== Marvel Comics ====
- Sensational She-Hulk #52 (1993)
- X-Men Classic #71–79 (1992)

==== Other publishers ====
- Big Trouble in Little China #1 SDCC Variant (2014) (BOOM! Studios)
- Gate Crasher TPB (Wizard Entertainment)
- Ghost one-shot (Dark Horse)
- Life with Archie #36 (2014) (Archie Comics)
- Star Wars: Purge (Dark Horse)
- Star Wars: Legacy #1–7 (Dark Horse)
- Star Wars: Rebel Heist #1–4 (Dark Horse)
- Tomb Raider #18, 32–34, 42–50 (Image)
- Vampirella #1–3 (Harris Comics)
- Voodoo #2–4 (Image)
- Wizard #83, 94, 129, 162
