= H. P. Lovecraft's Cthulhu: The Whisperer in Darkness =

H.P. Lovecraft’s Cthulhu: The Whisperer in Darkness

Publication information
- Publisher: Millennium Publications
- Format: limited series
- Publication date: December 1991 - April 1992
- No. of issues: 3
- Main character: The Miskatonic Project

Creative team
- Written by: Mark Ellis, Terry Collins
- Artist(s): Darryl Banks, Don Heck

H.P. Lovecraft’s Cthulhu: The Whisperer in Darkness was a three-part comic book mini-series published in the USA by Millennium Publications. It followed a group of investigators, the Miskatonic Project, as they confronted the Mi-go, the cunning Fungi from Yuggoth.

== Parts of the series ==
Lord Justin Sabbath and the Necronomicon, art by Darryl Banks.

Created by Mark Ellis, The Miskatonic Project consisted of three paranormal investigators who apparently had experienced brushes with the Great Old Ones in the past. Lord Justin Sabbath, Professor Augustus Grant, and psychic Fleur Avignon used the Miskatonic University as a base of operations. They worked closely with noted folklorist Professor Albert N. Wilmarth, who brought the Mi-Go to their attention.

Set in 1929, the first issue introduced the members of the Miskatonic Project in a framing sequence penciled by Darryl Banks and written by Mark Ellis. The rest of the issue was filled out by writer Terry Collins' adaptation of H.P. Lovecraft’s story "The Whisperer in Darkness", with art by noted Lovecraft illustrator Daryl Hutchison and Melissa Martin.

The following two issues presented a sequel to the events of "The Whisperer In Darkness", penciled by veteran Marvel Comics artist Don Heck, with a script provided by Mark Ellis and Terry Collins. The Mi-Go and their human collaborators were portrayed as paving the way for the return of the Old Ones, including Cthulhu. Inspector John Raymond Legrasse, the New Orleans police officer who first appeared in Lovecraft's inaugural Cthulhu story, "The Call of Cthulhu", appears in the second chapter.

The three issues were collected together as a single graphic novel published by Millennium Publications in 1993. An updated edition featuring new artwork and retitled The Miskatonic Project: H.P. Lovecraft's The Whisperer in Darkness was released by Transfuzion/Millennial Concepts in October 2008.

=== Trading cards ===
The three issues also included "Old Ones" trading cards, rendered by Darryl Banks, Daryl Hutchison, Deirdre DeLay, and Joe Phillips:

- Part One (Dec. 1991) — "Cthulhu" and "Cthulhu Statue" trading cards
- Part Two (Feb. 1992) — "Hastur" and "Mi-Go" trading cards
- Part Three (Apr. 1992) — "Yig, Father of Serpents" and "Quachil Uttaus" trading cards

== See also ==
- H.P. Lovecraft
- Cthulhu
