= Death Hawk =

Fictional comic book character

- Death Hawk #1, cover art by Dave Dorman

Publication information
- Publisher: Adventure Publications
- First appearance: Star Rangers #2 (1987)
- Created by: Mark Ellis (writer)

In-story information
- Species: Human
- Partnerships: Cyke (protosymbiote)

Death Hawk is a fictional American comic book character, a self-styled salvage expert in the 25th century. The character starred in a namesake, three-issue series published by Adventure Publications from 1987 to 1988, created and written by Mark Ellis. He first appeared in a five-page back-up feature in Star Rangers #2–3, by the same writer.

== Publication history ==
Death Hawk ran three issues cover-dated May to November 1988. The first issue was pencilled by artist Adam Hughes, succeeded with issue #2 by Rik Levins. The first two issues featured painted covers by Dave Dorman, the third by Steve Hickman.

Death Hawk was canceled after the third issue when the publisher went out of business. A fourth issue was completed but went unpublished at the time.

In September 2008, Ellis' Millennial Concepts (with Transfuzion Publishing) published a 128-page trade paperback, Death Hawk: The Soulworm Saga Volume One, that collected the published Death Hawk stories and the previously unpublished fourth issue. It included never-before seen incidental art by Darryl Banks, Jim Mooney and Robert Lewis.

In October 2019, graphic novel publisher Markosia released Death Hawk: The Complete Saga, in hardcover, trade paperback and digital editions with a new full-length story by artist Jeff Slemons.

== Fictional character biography ==
The 25th century as presented in Death Hawk and its companion series Star Rangers was a dystopia of Solar System-spanning corporations that held the true power behind the centralized government of the Sol 9 Commonwealth. Death Haek's true name revealed, the protagonist was the surviving member of a group of corporate outcasts who called themselves the Death Hawks. When the group was betrayed by one of their own, Death Hawk escaped in his 50-year-old spaceship the Peregrine. With the aid of his bio-engineered sidekick, Cyke, Death Hawk traveled the spaceways, eluding arrest warrants and creditors. Death Haek's is eye always out for ways to keep his salvage business going — often when legality was questionable.

Cyke, described as an "intelligent blob of goo", was a telepathic protosymbiote produced by the Biotek Corporation. Although Death Hawk is referred to Cyke as "he", the creature was sexless, but it possessed the ability to morph into a variety of sizes and shapes. Cyke was intelligent and more knowledgeable than his human partner and wasn't above reminding Death Hawk of the fact.

"The Soulworm Saga" story arc revolved around the quest for a mythical alien object of immense power.

Other characters included:

- Brigid O'Shaunessy/Vanessa Bouvier, a beautiful con artist who claimed to be an exo-archeologist.
- R'yex, an Arcturan mercenary who first opposed Death Hawk then out of necessity joined forces with him.
- Anton Chane, a director of the mysterious Biotek Corporation, whose agenda has far-reaching implications for the evolution of humanity.
- Takaun, one of the "high daimyos" of the Sol 9 Shogunate, who was just as crafty as Chane and as greedy as R'yex, but in his own way.
