= Purge (disambiguation) =

A purge is a cleansing or purification; in politics it means the forcible removal of undesirable people from political activity, etc.

Purge or The Purge may also refer to:

- Purge (occupied Japan), the forcible removal of undesirable Japanese from public service during occupation of Japan
- Great Purge, a campaign of political repression in the Soviet Union which occurred from 1936 to 1940
- The archaic term for emetic, a medicine to induce vomiting.
- Purging disorder, an eating disorder characterised by self induced vomiting, colloquially known as "purging"
- Genetic purging, the enhancement of selection against deleterious alleles that is prompted by inbreeding
- Purging (gas), a fire and explosion prevention procedure to avoid the formation of an ignitable atmosphere
- Purging (manufacturing), a cleaning process of injection molding to clean thermoplastics molding machines and extruders

== Films and television ==
- The Purge, a media franchise developed from the film series created by James DeMonaco
  - The Purge (2013 film), an American action-horror film
  - The Purge: Anarchy, a 2014 American action-horror film
  - The Purge: Election Year, a 2016 American action-horror film
  - The First Purge, a 2018 American action-horror film
  - The Purge (TV series), a 2018 TV series set in the media franchise
  - The Forever Purge, a 2021 American action-horror film
- Purge (2012 film), a Finnish film based on Oksanen's novel
- "The Purge" (Motherland), a 2019 television episode

== Print ==
- Purge (comic book), a 2005 Star Wars-based comic book
- Purge (novel) (Finnish: Puhdistus), a 2008 novel by Sofi Oksanen

== Music ==
- Purge (Bif Naked album), 2001
- Purge (Godflesh album), 2023
- Purge (EP), a 1994 EP by Econoline Crush
- "Purge" (song), a 2022 song by Willow
- "Purge", a song by Black Crown Initiate from 2014 album The Wreckage of Stars
- "The Purge", a song by In This Moment from 2023 album Godmode
- "The Purge", a song by Schoolboy Q from the 2014 album Oxymoron

== Other uses ==
- Purge (video game), a 2003 first-person shooter
- PURGE command of Files-11
- In patent law, in cases of patent misuse, discontinuance and elimination of anticompetitive effects of tie-in or other restrictive practices

== See also ==
- Bleeding (disambiguation)
- Detoxification (alternative medicine)
  - Colon cleansing, historical/alternative use of detoxification/purging in medicine
- Emetic
- Laxative
- Purging disorder
- Binging and purging
