= Star Rangers =

American science fiction comic book series

Publication information
- Publisher: Adventure Publications
- Publication date: October 1987 to February 1988
- No. of issues: 4

Creative team
- Written by: Mark Ellis
- Artist(s): Jim Mooney; Adam Hughes
- Editor: Scott Behnke

Star Rangers is a four-issue American black and white space opera[[[comic book]] series created by writer Mark Ellis and artist Jim Mooney. It following a military spaceship crew in a 25th-century controlled by corporations.

== Publication history ==
Star Rangers, released by the independent comics company Adventure Publications, ran four issue cover-dated October 1987 to February 1988. It was created by writer Mark Ellis and artist Jim Mooney. Scott Behnke edited the series, for which Dave Dorman provided cover art. Mooney was a longtime industry veteran of The Amazing Spider-Man and other series who had recently ended a contract with Marvel Comics to enter semi-retirement.

The character of Death Hawk appeared as a back-up feature by writer Ellis and penciler Adam Hughes in issues #2-3.

Plans were made for a second Star Rangers series and a crossover with Death Hawk, but Adventure Publications dissolved in the interim.

In a 2007 interview, Ellis recalled that

...I had been asked to write/create the Star Rangers series for Adventure Publications. I asked Jim if he was interested in working on the series with me and he agreed, much to my relief. Although we basically created Star Rangers, by the time editorial hands had been laid on our original concept, the series itself really didn't reflect our combined vision of a "Lonesome Dove in Space". Although the actual process of collaborating with Jim was fun, we both were a little disgruntled and disheartened by the way our concept had been jerked around with.

== Story ==
The series, set in the 25th century, revolved around the crew of the Sabre, the last ship in the Frontier Battalion of the once-fearsome Star Rangers Corps. In both Star Rangers and its companion series Death Hawk, the era is a dystopia of Solar System-spanning corporations that held the true power behind the centralized government of the Sol 9 Commonwealth. By the time of the series, the Star Rangers Corps has been reorganized into a token peacekeeping force while the corporations maintain their own security divisions, such as the Sol 9 Shogunate's Tigers of Heaven. As such, all Star Rangers ships and weaponry are outdated, making it difficult for Sabre crew to perform its duties. The ship patrols Sectors Four through Nine of the Orion Spur.

The crew consists of:

- Commander Jon Blake
- Aristo, the reptilian medic
- Ahrikeem, master of combat from the Vholon Empire
- Radac, the ship's synthetic human engineer
- Maya Lucas, an embittered pilot who has little use for men.

They report to Commodore Nyota M'membe.

The story arc of the four-issue series dealt with the Rangers uncovering a conspiracy between two corporations and the criminal empire of Lord Rogue on the Freeworld of Amicus, and finding themselves branded criminals by their own organization.
