= Villains Unlimited =

Villains Unlimited is a 1992 role-playing supplement for Heroes Unlimited published by Palladium Books.

== Contents ==
Villains Unlimited is a supplement in which new powers, technology, rules, and characters are presented.

== Publication history ==
Shannon Appelcline commented that after Palladium gave up its license to the Justice Machine comics, "They have since reprinted many of the powers from the book in the revised edition of Heroes Unlimited (1987) and have even replaced Justice Machine's internal stock number with a new book, Villains Unlimited (1992)." It was the first product published for the revised Heroes Unlimited line.

== Reception ==
Charles Peirce reviewed Villains Unlimited in White Wolf #32 (July/Aug., 1992), rating it a 3 out of 5 and stated that "Villains Unlimited is a book which should expand existing campaigns. It is a fair product, with some interesting ideas."
