= Bob Ingersoll =

American lawyer and writer (born 1952)

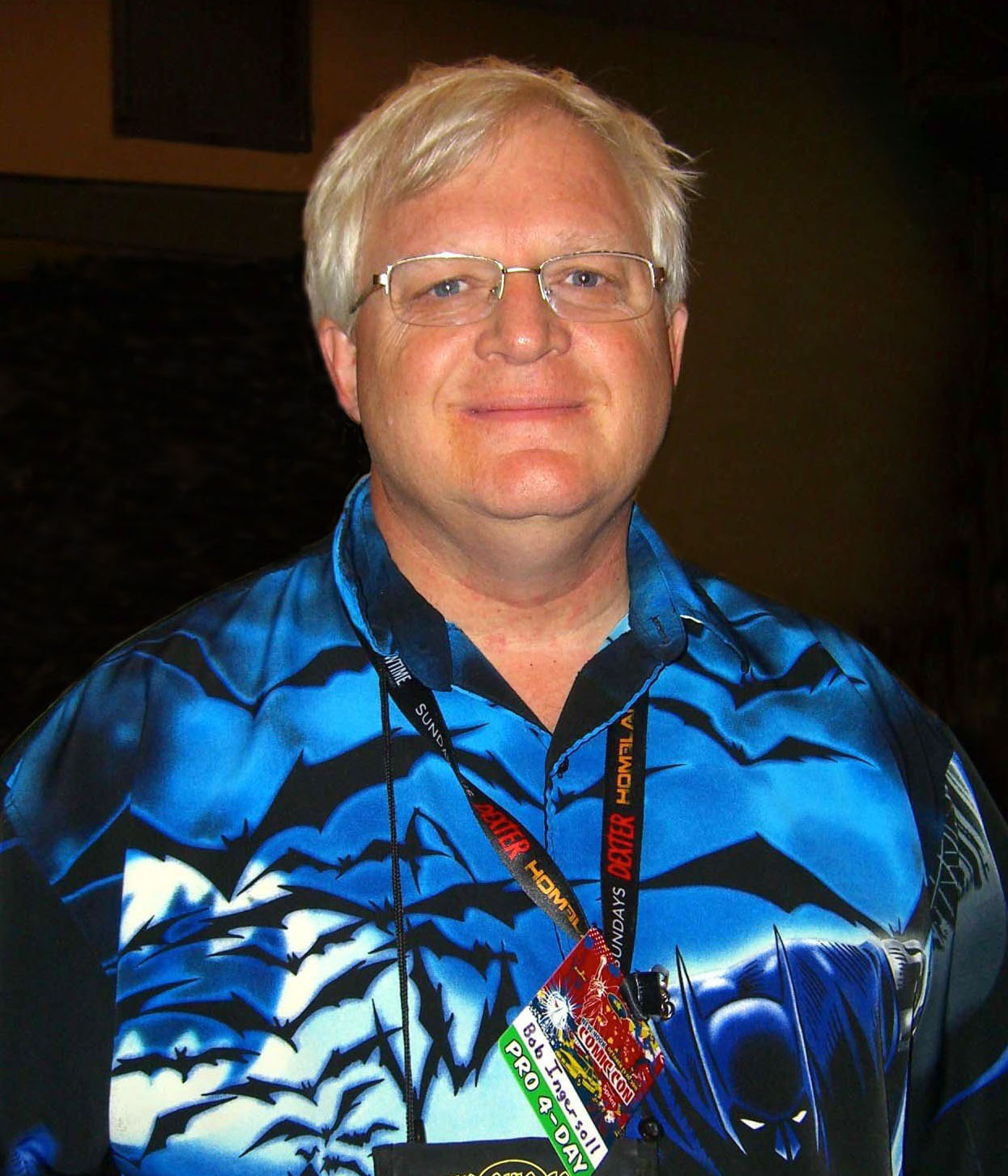
- Ingersoll in 2011
- Born: October 13, 1952 (age 74)
- Area: Writer
- Notable works: "The Law is a Ass"; Donald Duck; The Green Hornet; House of Mystery; Justice Machine; Moon Knight

Robert Ingersoll (born October 13, 1952) is an American lawyer and writer. Ingersoll's full-time occupation was an appellate attorney with the Cuyahoga County Public Defender Office in Cleveland, Ohio, until he retired in 2009. He is more widely known for his writing, in particular his work in comic books.

== Career ==
Comic series he has written for include Donald Duck, The Green Hornet, House of Mystery, Justice Machine, Mickey Mouse, Moon Knight and Star Trek: All of Me. He was also a frequent contributor for Innovation Comics where he contributed to the Lost in Space and Quantum Leap comic books as well as being the regular writer on Hero Alliance.

Since 1983 Ingersoll has written "The Law Is a Ass" (sic; the title comes from Mr. Bumble's dialogue in Charles Dickens' Oliver Twist and preserves the character's grammatical error), a regular column in Comics Buyer's Guide, which was also published online by World Famous Comics.com from 1999 to 2003. The column examines the depiction of the law in comics and other fiction and compares it humorously to the reality of legal practice. On February 14, 2014 Ingersoll revived "The Law Is a Ass" on the ComicMix web site.

He is also the writer of several prose works. He wrote the horror story Making the Leap which was published in Hot Blood XI: Fatal Attractions (2003, ISBN 0-7582-0099-4). He is the co-author (with his fellow Comic Buyer's Guide columnist Tony Isabella) of the short story If Wishes Were Horses... (which was published in The Ultimate Super Villains, ISBN 1-57297-113-4, in 1996) and the novels Captain America: Liberty's Torch (1998 ISBN 0-425-16619-8) and Star Trek: The Case Of The Colonist's Corpse (A Sam Cogley Mystery) (2003, ISBN 0-7434-6497-4). He is co-author (with fellow comic-book creator Thomas F. Zahler) of the short story "'Til Death", which was published in Star Trek: The Next Generation: The Sky's the Limit in 2007.

In 1987 (in the pages of Secret Origins #14), writer John Ostrander named a piece of legislation in the fictional DC universe the "Ingersoll Amendment".
