= The Justice Machine =

The Justice Machine is a 1985 role-playing game supplement published by Palladium Books for Heroes Unlimited.

== Contents ==
The Justice Machine is a supplement in which an in-depth look is provided for the Justice Machine superhero team, with character profiles for both heroes and villains. The supplement also explores the science-fiction world of Georwell, detailing its oppressive government and culture.

== Publication history ==
Justice Machine Source Book was written by Kevin Siembieda, with art by Mike Gustovich and other famous comics artists, and was published by Palladium Books in 1985 as a 144-page book.

Shannon Appelcline noted that "Palladium's first license was for Mike Gustovich's Justice Machine, a small press-superhero comic from Noble Comics that had been cancelled after five issues in 1983) in fact, the RPG used the original cover for issue #6). Palladium's The Justice Machine (1985) was a supplement for Heroes Unlimited and in itself might have done Palladium some good, as the comic got picked up by second-tier publisher Comico the next year, and went on to a multi-year full-colour run." Appelcline also noted that "However, The Justice Machine is notable today for something that has nothing to do with its success 25 years ago. Today The Justice Machine is one of the biggest Palladium collector items on the secondary market, for reasons that highlight some of Palladium's core policies. Unlike almost anyone else in the industry, Palladium does their best to keep all their books in print [...] The exceptions are the licensed properties, which of course depend on contracts from other publishers. In the case of Justice Machine, creator Mike Gustovich did work for Palladium several years but meanwhile the comic went through several publishers after Comico. The Gustovich disappeared. As a result of increasingly confused rights issues, Palladium eventually gave The Justice Machine up for lost." Appelcline continued, "Returning to The Justice Machine's impact on Palladium of the mid-80s, it was important for one other reason: it gave Kevin Siembieda experience in licensing rights for a roleplaying game. That likely put him more at ease when a freelancer called up and suggested he write a Palladium sourcebook about the Teenage Mutant Ninja Turtles.

== Reviews ==
- Comics Feature #38
