= Alien Nation (comics) =

Alien Nation comic books were a number of comic books based on the Alien Nation entertainment media franchise. DC Comics initially produced a single-issue comic book adaptation of the 1988 film. Later, Malibu Comics, under their Adventure Comics imprint, produced several spin-off titles between 1990 and 1992.

== Publications ==
| Title | Creators | Publisher | Number of Issues | Publication Dates | Notes |
|---|---|---|---|---|---|
| Alien Nation | Writer: Martin Pasko; Penciller/Inker: Jerry Bingham | DC Comics | One-shot | December 1988 | |
Story: An adaptation of the original theatrical film written by Rockne S. O'Bannon.
| Alien Nation: The Spartans | Writer: Bill Spangler; Penciller: James Tucker | Adventure Comics (Malibu Comics imprint) | 4 | July - November 1990 | Also released as a trade paperback |
Story: Ruth Lawrence, of the Newcomer Advocacy League, is asked by Newcomer Harvey Wallbanger to help locate his missing brother, Art Deco. After receiving a visit by a mysterious Overseer, Wallbanger wants the case dropped...which deepens the mystery for Lawrence even more.
| Alien Nation: A Breed Apart | Writer: Steve Jones; Penciller: Stan Timmons; Inker: Jimmy Palmiotti | Adventure Comics (Malibu Comics imprint) | 4 | November 1990 - March 1991 | This mini-series ended on an unresolved cliffhanger. |
Story: LAPD detectives Wayne Hadenfelt, a human, and Log B'Omen, a Newcomer, respond to a home invasion call. In the aftermath, details of the case suggest gangland assassination.
| Alien Nation: The Skin Trade | Writer: Lowell Cunningham; Penciller: Leonard Kirk | Adventure Comics (Malibu Comics imprint) | 4 | March - June 1991 | |
| Ape Nation | Writer: Charles Marshall; Penciller: M.C. Wyman | Adventure Comics (Malibu Comics imprint) | 4 | February - June 1991 | Crossover with Planet Of The Apes |
| Alien Nation: The Firstcomers | Writer: Martin Powell; Penciller: Tim Eldred | Adventure Comics (Malibu Comics imprint) | 4 | May - August 1991 | |
| Alien Nation: The Public Enemy | Writer: Lowell Cunningham; Penciller: Sandy Carruthers | Adventure Comics (Malibu Comics imprint) | 4 | December - March 1991 | |
| Alien Nation Television Special: The Lost Episode | Writer: Bill Spangler; Penciller: Terry Pallot | Malibu Graphics | One-shot | 1992 | |
Based on "Soul Train," a script from the aborted second season of the Alien Nation TV series, by Diane Frolov and Andrew Schneider. The premise and elements of this script were later developed into the Alien Nation: Dark Horizon TV movie.

== See also ==
- List of comics based on films
