= Mike Gustovich =

American artist (born 1953)

- Born: November 15, 1953 (age 73) Warren, Ohio, U.S.
- Areas: Writer, Artist, Inker, Publisher
- Notable works: Noble Comics; Cobalt Blue; Justice Machine; Icon
- Spouse: Valerie Gustovich

Michael Gustovich (born November 15, 1953) is an American artist, known for his comic book art and inking in the 1980s and early 1990s for such publishers as Marvel Comics, DC Comics, First Comics, Comico, and Eclipse Comics. He is the creator of the superhero team Justice Machine, which throughout the 1980s and early 1990s was featured in comics from several publishers.

== Biography ==
In 1976, Gustovich joined a consortium of fans and would-be professionals" — including Stu Fillmore — in Detroit "who adopted the company name" Noble Comics, and published The Lands of Prester John, a 64-page one-shot of Gustovich's superhero, science fiction, and horror stories.

Gustovich then moved to fellow Michigan-based independent publisher Power Comics Company, becoming the company's art director as well as creating the superhero feature Cobalt Blue, which appeared in Power Comics anthology and then also in a self-titled single-issue comic. Power Comics Company dissolved in 1978.

In 1981, Gustovich returned to Noble Comics, creating the superhero team Justice Machine, publishing five issues of the title over two years. Issues #4-5 of Justice Machine were flip books with new Cobalt Blue stories.

Noble Comics shut down in 1983, but Gustovich licensed Justice Machine to the brand-new publisher Texas Comics, which published a single comic before itself shutting down — Justice Machine Annual #1, a crossover with the then-defunct Tower Comics' superhero team T.H.U.N.D.E.R. Agents. (By happenstance, Bill Willingham's The Elementals also debuted in Justice Machine Annual #1, an association which became important later on in both feature's histories.)

From 1983 to 1985, Gustovich focused on other projects, as he inked the majority of First Comics' Warp! series.

In 1986, Justice Machine — and Willingham's Elementals — were acquired by Comico: The Comic Company, which rebooted the Justice Machine's continuity. First Comico published four issues of Justice Machine Featuring The Elementals, with Gustovich providing the art and Willingham the scripts. Comico subsequently published an ongoing Justice Machine series (vol. 2) that lasted 29 issues plus a 1989 annual. Tony Isabella was the first writer for this series; Gustovich co-plotted and penciled the vast majority of issues, and provided inks for the issues he didn't draw. The ongoing book became one of Comico's best-selling series, selling upwards of 70,000 copies of each issue at its peak.

From 1989 to 1990, Innovation Publishing published a three-issue limited series, The New Justice Machine, by Mark Ellis with pencils by Darryl Banks and others, and inks by Gustovich. (Innovation also published a few new issues of Gustovich's Cobalt Blue title.) In 1990, Innovation launched Justice Machine vol. 3, which ran seven issues, as well as a one-shot, with Gustovich serving as inker on all the books. Justice Machine vol. 3 was originally produced by Ellis and Banks, but Gustovich came on as both penciler and inker for issues #4-6, with Isabella rejoining as writer for the final three issues. In 1989, Innovation also published a trade paperback of Gustovich's Cobalt Blue, done in collaboration with Keith Pollard.

Those last few issues of Justice Machine turned out to be Gustovich's final work on his creation, as he embarked on a full-time career as an inker-for-hire, working for dozens of series put out by all the major publishers. For instance, Gustovich inked most of the 1990s Milestone Media series Icon (written by Dwayne McDuffie and penciled by M.D. Bright).

He retired from the comics industry in the late 1990s, later teaching at the Virginia Marti College of Art and Design (now known as North Coast College) in Lakewood, Ohio.
