= Nosferatu: Plague of Terror =

1990s American comic series

- Cover of issue #1

Publication information
- Publisher: Millennium Publications
- Publication date: 1991 – 1992

Creative team
- Written by: Mark Ellis
- Artist(s): Rik Levins; Richard Pace; Frank Turner

Nosferatu: Plague of Terror, later published under the title Nosferatu: Sovereign of Terror, is a four-part comic series released by American publisher Millennium Publications from 1991 to 1992. Conceived as both a prequel and sequel to F.W. Murnau's silent film Nosferatu, it was written by Mark Ellis, designed by Melissa Martin, with art provided by Rik Levins, Richard Pace, and Frank Turner.

== Plot ==
Returning from the Crusades in the eleventh century, English knight Sir William Longsword stops at Count Orlok's castle in Transylvania, and finds the nuns dead or dying of plague. Longsword's squire, seeking treasure, inadvertently frees Orlok who kills the man. He bites Longsword but does not turn him into a vampire – rather, he becomes immortal for reasons known only to Orlok. The series tracks Orlok throughout history as he perpetuates his evil, instigating wars and bringing down plagues. Longsword tracks him through 19th-century India and the madness of the Vietnam War and finally catches up to him in an abandoned cathedral in contemporary Brooklyn. The final chapter ends in a conflagration in which both Orlok and Longsword are killed but the curse of the Nosferatu is passed onto an innocent, as it was to Longsword ten centuries before.

== Reception ==
Nosferatu: A Plague of Terror has received praise for its characterization of Count Orlok and for distinguishing him from Count Dracula, on whom the character was originally based. Reviewer Sean Murphy also praised the comic for the relationship between Count Orlok and William Longsword, comparing their rivalry to that of Batman and Joker.
