= Aliens Unlimited Galaxy Guide =

Aliens Unlimited Galaxy Guide is a 2001 role-playing game supplement published by Palladium Books for Heroes Unlimited.

== Contents ==
Aliens Unlimited Galaxy Guide is a supplement in which new alien races, civilizations, empires, equipment, skills, powers, and rules for space travel, combat, and spaceship creation provide everything needed to launch interstellar superhero or science‑fiction campaigns across the Milky Way.

== Reviews ==
- Pyramid
- Backstab #33
