= Jenny Blake Isabella =

American comic book creator and critic (born 1951)

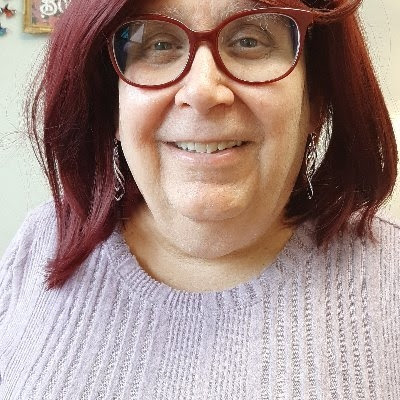
- Jenny Blake Isabella selfie
- Born: December 22, 1951 (age 74) Cleveland, Ohio, U.S.
- Area: Writer
- Notable works: Black Goliath; Black Lightning; The Champions; Justice Machine "Tony's Tips"
- Awards: Goethe Award 1972; Inkpot Award 2013

Jenny Blake Isabella (born December 22, 1951), who writes under the name Jenny Blake and previously wrote under the name Tony Isabella, is an American comic book writer, editor, actor, artist and critic. She is the creator of Marvel Comics superhero Black Goliath, and of DC Comics' first major African-American superhero, Black Lightning. She was a columnist and critic for the Comics Buyer's Guide magazine.

== Early life ==
Jenny Blake Isabella was born on December 22, 1951, in Cleveland, Ohio, having been assigned male at birth. She discovered comics at the age of four, when her mother began bringing her I. W. Publications titles she bought at Woolworth. Early influences from the comic book world included Stan Lee, Jack Kirby, Roy Thomas, Robert Kanigher, and Len Wein; Isabella also cited being influenced by William Shakespeare, Harlan Ellison, Ed McBain, Neil Simon, Mel Brooks, Lester Dent, Dave Barry, Max Allan Collins, Don Pendleton, and Studs Terkel.

As a teenager, she had many letters published in comic book letter columns, primarily in the pages of Marvel titles. She was an active member of the comics fandom, a member of CAPA-alpha (an amateur press association for comics), and a regular contributor to comics fanzines.

== Career ==
=== Marvel Comics ===
Isabella's fanzine work attracted the attention of Marvel editor Roy Thomas (whose earliest published writings had been in fanzines such as Alter Ego), and in 1972 Thomas hired Isabella as an editorial assistant. With Marvel's establishment of Marvel UK that year, Isabella oversaw reprints used in Marvel UK's nascent comics line. She briefly edited for Marvel's black-and-white magazine line.

As a writer, Isabella scripted Ghost Rider, the characters It! The Living Colossus in Astonishing Tales, Luke Cage in Hero for Hire and Power Man, the Living Mummy in Supernatural Tales, Tigra in Marvel Chillers, Daredevil, and Captain America. While writing the "Iron Fist" feature in Marvel Premiere, she co-created the supporting character Misty Knight with artist Arvell Jones. Isabella developed the concept of The Champions series and wrote the first several issues.

==== Controversy ====
During her mid-1970s run on Ghost Rider, Isabella wrote a two-year story arc in which Johnny Blaze occasionally encountered an unnamed character referred to as "the Friend" who protected him from Satan, the source of his supernatural powers and identity as Ghost Rider. Isabella said in 2007:

Getting prior approval from editor Roy Thomas, as I would from later editors Len Wein and Marv Wolfman, I introduced "The Friend" into the series. He looked sort of like a hippie Jesus Christ and that's exactly who He was, though I never actually called Him that.... It allowed me to address a disparity that had long bothered me about the Marvel Universe. Though we had no end of Hell(s) and Satan surrogates in our comics, we had nothing of Heaven.... [After two years] I'd written a story wherein, couched in mildly subtle terms, Blaze accepted Jesus as his savior and freed himself from Satan's power forever. Had I remained on Ghost Rider, which was my intent at the time, the title's religious elements would have faded into the background. Blaze would be a Christian, but he'd express this in the way he led his life. ... Unfortunately, an assistant editor took offense at my story. The issue was ready to go to the printer when he pulled it back and ripped it to pieces. He had some of the art redrawn and a lot of the copy rewritten to change the ending of a story two years in the making. "The Friend" was revealed to be, not Jesus, but a demon in disguise. To this day, I consider what he did to my story one of the three most arrogant and wrongheaded actions I've ever seen from an editor.

Isabella later identified the assistant editor as Jim Shooter. In 2020, Shooter said he was concerned that this "basically established the Marvel universe is a Christian universe" and could alienate readers by suggesting "that all other religions are false". Shooter said he made the changes after consulting with editor Marv Wolfman.

=== DC Comics ===
Isabella worked as a writer and story editor for DC Comics, and is known for creating Black Lightning, and writing both the character's short-lived 1970s and 1990s series. After reaching an agreement with DC, Isabella returned to the character in 2017 with the publication of the Black Lightning: Cold Dead Hands limited series.

Isabella and artist Richard Howell produced the Shadow War of Hawkman mini-series in 1985, involving the characters of Hawkman and Hawkwoman. An ongoing series was launched the following year.

=== Justice Machine ===
In 1987, Isabella began writing the Justice Machine series for Comico, co-plotting with series creator and penciller Mike Gustovich. The new series picked up from the end of the Bill Willingham/Gustovich written limited series Justice Machine featuring the Elementals, which re-booted the series' continuity from the older Noble Comics/Texas Comics-published original series. The ongoing book became one of Comico's best-selling series, selling upwards of 70,000 copies of each issue at its peak. Isabella wrote the first 11 issues of the Comico series before moving on to other projects.

In 1990, Isabella returned to the characters and wrote the series for Innovation Comics, with Gustovich pencilling once more.

=== "Tony's Tips" ===
Isabella wrote the Comics Buyer's Guide column "Tony's Tips" for over a decade. The last column was June 22, 2010. Starting in 2013, she continued "Tony's Tips" online at Tales of Wonder. She also regularly writes about comics and her work on her personal blog.

=== Books ===
Isabella and her fellow Comics Buyer's Guide columnist Bob Ingersoll co-authored the short story "If Wishes Were Horses..." which was published in The Ultimate Super-Villains: New Stories Featuring Marvel's Deadliest Villains (1996). The pair also wrote the novels Captain America: Liberty's Torch (1998) and Star Trek: The Case Of The Colonist's Corpse (2003).

In 2009, her non-fiction book 1000 Comics You Must Read was published by Krause Publications.

=== Other work ===
During the 1980s, Isabella operated Cosmic Comics, a comic book shop in the Colonial Arcade in Downtown Cleveland.

She has localized foreign-language Disney comics for the U.S. market.

In 2020, Isabella cameoed as "Judge Isabella" on The CW series Black Lightning, based on the DC comic created by her and Trevor Von Eeden, who also plays a judge.

== Personal life ==
Isabella and her wife Barbara have two children, Eddie (born c. 1989) and Kelly (born c. 1992).

In a February 9, 2025 social media post, Isabella came out as transgender with a meme reading "Keep Calm and Yes I'm Transgender". In a Facebook post, she said she would continue writing as both Jenny Blake Isabella and Tony Isabella. Her first story written under the Jenny Blake Isabella name appeared in the DC Pride 2025 anthology, an autobiographical piece setting out the path her life took to coming out as transgender.

== Awards ==
- 1972 Goethe Award for "Favorite Fan Writer"
- 2013 Inkpot Award
- 2026 Bill Finger Award

== Bibliography ==
=== Atlas/Seaboard Comics ===
- Grim Ghost #3 (1975)
- Tales of Evil #3 (1975)

=== Atlas Comics (Ardden Entertainment) ===
- Grim Ghost vol. 2 #1–6 (with Stephen Susco) (2010–2011)

=== Caliber Comics ===
- Negative Burn #46 (1997)

=== Comico ===
- Justice Machine #1–6, 8–11 (1987)

=== Dark Horse ===
- Harlan Ellison's Dream Corridor Quarterly #1 (with Harlan Ellison) (1996)
- Star Wars Tales #2 (1999)

=== DC Comics ===
- Black Lightning #1–10 (1977–1978)
- Black Lightning vol. 2 #1–8 (1995)
- Black Lightning: Cold Dead Hands #1–6 (2018)
- DC Comics Presents #95 (1986)
- DCU Holiday Bash #2 (Black Lightning) (1998)
- Hawkman vol. 2 #1–9, Special #1 (1986–1987)
- Heroes Against Hunger #1 (1986)
- Mystery in Space #111 (1980)
- Secret Origins vol. 2 #26 (Black Lightning) (1988)
- Shadow War of Hawkman #1–4 (1985)
- Star Trek #22–23, 29, 31 (1986)
- Star Trek: All of Me #1 (with Bob Ingersoll) (2000)
- Star Trek: The Next Generation Special #1 (with Bob Ingersoll) (1993)
- Tarzan Family #66 (1976)
- Teen Titans Spotlight #16 (Thunder and Lightning), #17 (Magenta) (1987)
- Welcome Back, Kotter #3 (1977)
- World's Finest Comics #244 (Green Arrow) (1977)

=== IDW ===
- Ditko's Monsters (foreword) (2019)
- Star Trek: Gold Key Archives #1 (foreword) (2014)

=== Image Comics ===
- Geeksville #3 (2000)

=== Innovation Publishing ===
- Justice Machine vol. 3 #5–7 (1990–1991)
- Sentry Special #1 (with Bob Ingersoll) (1991)

=== Marvel Comics ===
- The Amazing Spider-Man Annual #24 (1990)
- Astonishing Tales #21–24 (It! The Living Colossus) (1973–1974)
- The Avengers #145–146 (1976)
- Black Goliath #1 (1976)
- Captain America #168, 189–191 (1973–1975)
- Chamber of Chills #5 (1973)
- Champions #1–3, 5–7 (1975–1976)
- Creatures on the Loose #25, 32 (1973–1974)
- Daredevil #119–123 (1975)
- Deadly Hands of Kung Fu #10, Special #1 (1974–1975)
- Doc Savage #7–8 (1973–1974)
- Dracula Lives #6, 9, 13 (1974–1975)
- Fantastic Four #153 (1974)
- Ghost Rider #7–9, 11–15, 17–19 (1974–1976)
- Giant-Size Creatures #1 (1974)
- Giant-Size Defenders #1 (1974)
- Giant-Size Dracula #5 (1975)
- Haunt of Horror #4 (1974)
- Hero for Hire #15 (1973)
- Legion of Monsters #1 (1975)
- Marvel Chillers #3, 5–6 (Tigra) (1976)
- Marvel Comics #1001 (2019)
- Marvel Premiere #20–22 (Iron Fist) (1975)
- Marvel Tales #242, 250 (Rocket Racer backup stories) (1990–1991)
- Marvel Team-Up #145 (1984)
- Marvels Comics: Daredevil #1 (2000)
- Monsters Unleashed #3–5, 10 (1973–1975)
- Moon Knight #34–35 (1983–1984)
- Power Man #20, 22–25 (1974–1975)
- Power Man and Iron Fist #110 (1984)
- The Spectacular Spider-Man #35, Annual #10 (1979, 1990)
- Super-Villain Team-Up #1–2 (1975)
- Supernatural Thrillers #8–13 (1974–1975)
- Tales of the Zombie #2–3, 5, 9 (1973–1975)
- Unknown Worlds of Science Fiction #1–4 (1975)
- Vampire Tales #4 (1974)
- War Is Hell #9–10 (1974)
- Web of Spider-Man #74–76, Annual #6–7 (1990–1991)
- What If...? #24 (Spider-Man) (1980)

=== Moonstone ===
- The Phantom: Generations TPB (new 12-page text story) (2010)

=== Topps Comics ===
- Jack Kirby's Secret City Saga #0 (1993)
- Satan's Six #1–4 (1993)

=== Warren Publishing ===
- Vampirella #26 (ghostwriter for Len Wein) (1973)

== Filmography ==
Television roles
Year	Title	Role	Notes
2020	Black Lightning	Judge Isabella	Episode: "The Book of War: Chapter Three: Liberation"

Preceded by Gary Friedrich	Ghost Rider writer 1974–1976	Succeeded by Gerry Conway
Preceded by John Warner	Captain America writer 1975	Succeeded by Jack Kirby
Preceded by Steve Gerber	Daredevil writer 1975 (with Bob Brown in late 1975)	Succeeded by Marv Wolfman
Preceded by n/a	Black Lightning writer 1977–1978	Succeeded by Dennis O'Neil
Preceded by n/a	Hawkman writer 1986–1987	Succeeded by Dan Mishkin
Preceded by Bill Willingham	Justice Machine writer 1987	Succeeded by Doug Murray
Preceded by n/a	Black Lightning vol. 2 writer 1995	Succeeded by Dave DeVries
