= It! The Terror from Beyond Space =

1958 film by Edward L. Cahn

- Theatrical release poster
- Directed by: Edward L. Cahn
- Written by: Jerome Bixby
- Produced by: Robert Kent; Edward Small (uncredited)
- Starring: Marshall Thompson; Shawn Smith; Kim Spalding; Dabbs Greer; Ray Corrigan
- Narrated by: Marshall Thompson
- Cinematography: Kenneth Peach
- Edited by: Grant Whytock
- Music by: Paul Sawtell; Bert Shefter
- Production companies: Vogue Pictures, Inc.
- Distributed by: United Artists
- Release date: August 7, 1958
- Running time: 69 minutes
- Country: United States
- Language: English

It! The Terror from Beyond Space is an independently made 1958 American science fiction horror film, produced by Robert Kent, directed by Edward L. Cahn, starring Marshall Thompson, Shawn Smith, and Kim Spalding. It was released by United Artists on August 7, 1958, and played as a double feature with Curse of the Faceless Man.

The story involves Earth's second mission to Mars to discover the fate of the first. The single survivor from that crashed spaceship, the expedition commander, claims his crew was killed by a Martian life form. None of the rescue crew believes him until the creature, now a stowaway, begins hunting them on their return trip to Earth.

The film's premise (along with Mario Bava's Planet of the Vampires and Curtis Harrington's Queen of Blood) has been cited as inspiration for Dan O'Bannon's screenplay for Alien (1979).

== Plot ==
In 1973, a nuclear-powered spaceship blasts off from Mars for Earth, bringing with it the sole survivor of the first mission, Col. Edward Carruthers. He is suspected of having murdered the other nine members of his crew for their food and water rations, on the premise that he had no way of knowing if or when an Earth rescue mission would arrive. Carruthers denies this, attributing his crew's deaths to a hostile humanoid life form.

Commander Col. Van Heusen is unconvinced and ensures that Carruthers is constantly accompanied. While the ship was on the Martian surface, a hatch had been left open, allowing the creature access. The crew is skeptical that something crawled aboard. When Kienholz investigates sounds from a lower level, he is killed and his body hidden in an air duct. Next, Gino Finelli is found barely alive, and the creature attacks his would-be rescuer. Bullets have no effect, forcing the crewman to leave Gino. An autopsy reveals Kienholz's body has been sucked dry of all fluids.

The creature proves to be immune to hand grenades and gas grenades. Electrocution also has no effect. The crew lure "It" into the atomic reactor room and expose the creature directly to the nuclear pile. It easily crashes through the heavily shielded door and escapes. The survivors retreat to the control room. Carruthers notices the ship's higher-than-normal oxygen consumption rate and surmises that the creature has larger lung capacity, needed for the thin Martian atmosphere. The crew don their spacesuits, and Carruthers opens the airlock directly to the vacuum of space. In a violent decompression "It" suffocates, stuck part way through the final hatch.

A press conference on Earth reveals what happened aboard the rescue ship. The project director emphasizes that Earth may be forced to bypass the Red Planet, "because another word for Mars is Death".

== Cast ==
- Marshall Thompson as Col. Edward Carruthers
- Shirley Patterson as Ann Anderson (as Shawn Smith)
- Kim Spalding as Col. Van Heusen
- Dabbs Greer as Eric Royce
- Paul Langton as Lt. James Calder
- Robert Bice as Maj. John Purdue
- Richard Benedict as Bob Finelli
- Ann Doran as Mary Royce
- Richard Hervey as Gino Finelli
- Thom Carney as Joe Kienholz
- Ray Corrigan as It

== Production ==
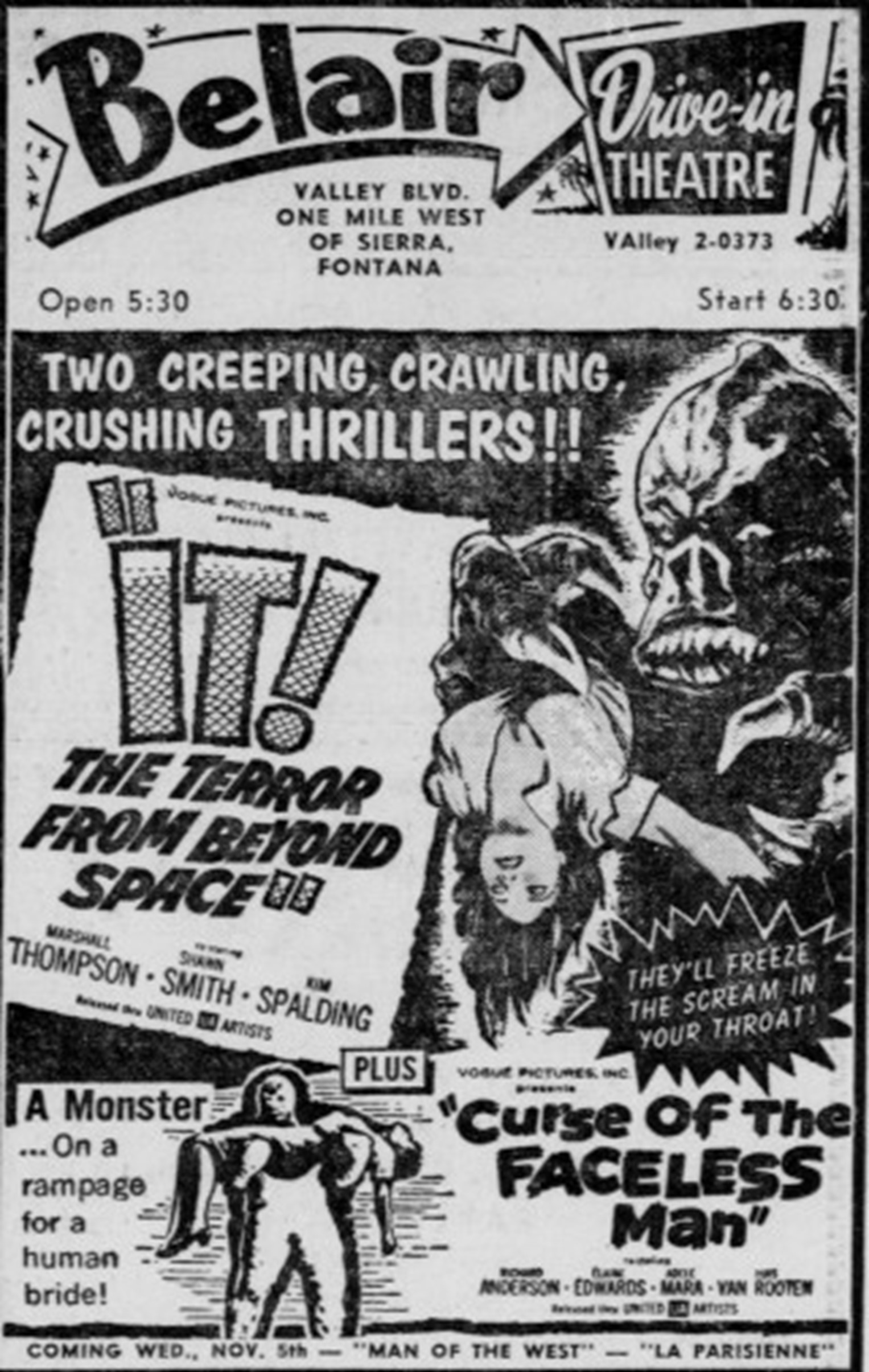
Drive-in advertisement from 1958 featuring It! The Terror from Beyond Space with companion feature, Curse of the Faceless Man.

It! The Terror from Beyond Space was financed by Edward Small and was originally known as It! The Vampire from Beyond Space. Principal photography took place over two weeks during mid-January 1958. Small kept changing his mind over whether he wanted plastic eyes installed in the creature's mask, causing aggravation for makeup artist Paul Blaisdell.

It! was the last film of actor Ray "Crash" Corrigan, who was set to play the creature but did not want to travel to Topanga Canyon for Paul Blaisdell to take measurements of his head. Consequently, there were fitment problems with the creature's head: "[Corrigan's]...bulbous chin stuck out through the monster's mouth, so the make-up man painted his chin to look like a tongue". Blaisdell then added a row of fangs to cover Corrigan's chin.

Blaisdell said working for United Artists wasn't nearly as happy as working at AIP. Corrigan turned up drunk on set a few times, refused to follow certain directions from Ed Cahn, and damaged the monster suit, requiring Blaisdell to attend to patch it up. Shirley Patterson was in a constant bad mood, furious to have been cast in a low-budget monster film. Blaisdell said only Marshall Thompson seemed to be enjoying himself. The creature costume became the property of UA, and a year later showed up in their 1959 John Agar opus, Invisible Invaders, without additional payment for Blaisdell.

Bob Burns, Tom Weaver, Larry Blamire, and David Schecter feature on the production commentary for Kino Lorber's 2023 Blu-ray release.

== Reception ==
At the film review aggregator website Rotten Tomatoes, the film holds an approval rating of 74% based on 19 reviews, with a weighted average rating of 6.3/10.

Variety noted that the creature was the star: "'It' is a Martian by birth, a Frankenstein by instinct, and a copycat. The monster dies hard, brushing aside grenades, bullets, gas and an atomic pile, before snorting its last snort. It's old stuff, with only a slight twist". A retrospective review by Dennis Schwartz compared It! favorably with Alien (1979).

== Adaptations ==
In 1992, Millennium Publications adapted It! The Terror from Beyond Space as a short-run comic book series, written by Mark Ellis and Dean Zachary. A further comics adaptation was released by Midnite Movies (IDW Publishing) in 2010, for a three-issue run.

== See also ==
- List of films set on Mars
