= Michel Lacombe =

Canadian comic book artist

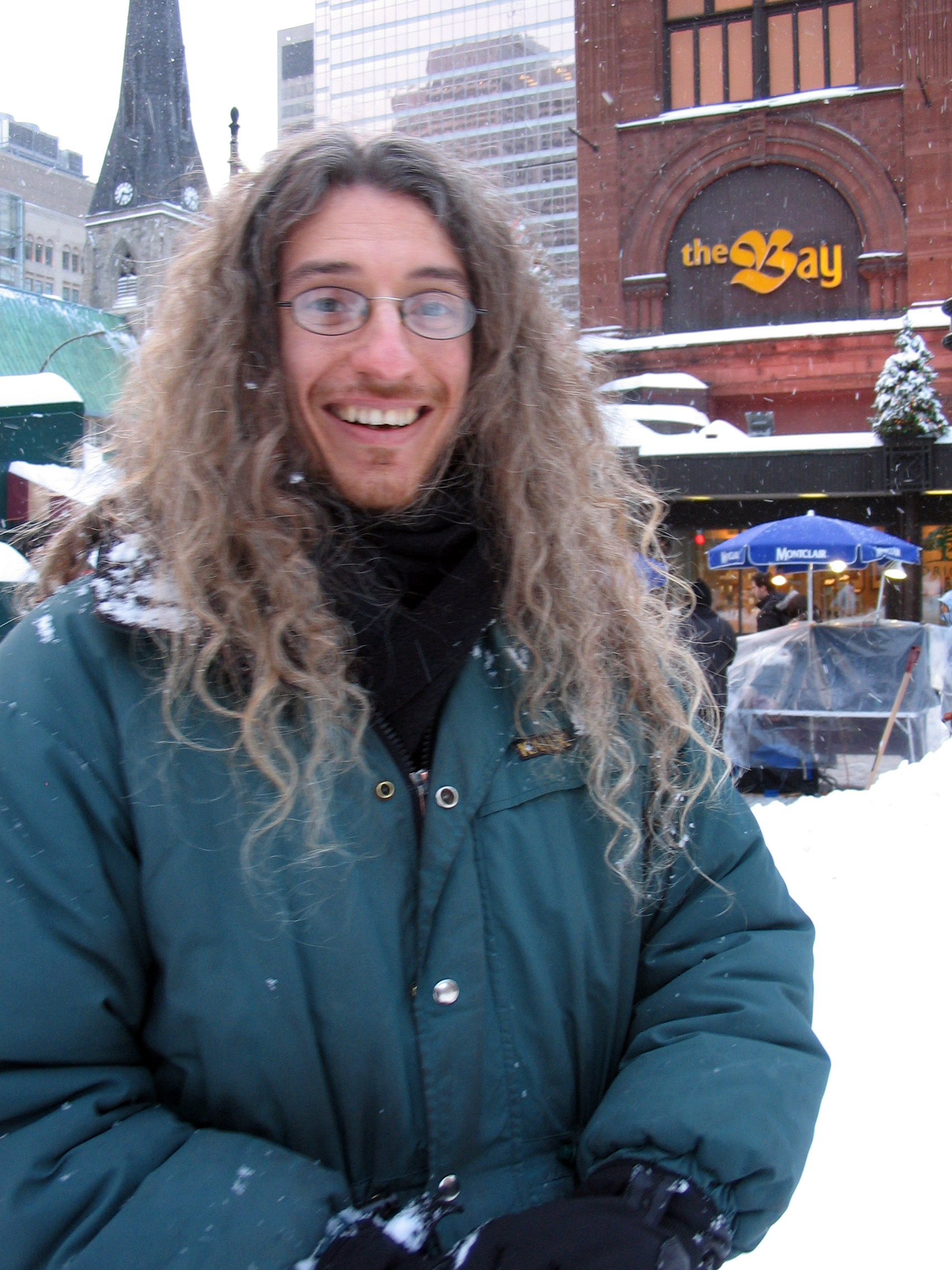
- Michel Lacombe in the snow, 2005. Photo: Jhayne.
- Born: 1973 (age 52–53) Montréal Québec
- Areas: Writer, Penciller, Artist, Inker, Letterer, Colourist
- Notable works: Star Wars; The Punisher; Warrior Nun Areala; One Bloody Year

Michel Lacombe (born 1973 in Montréal, Québec) is a Canadian comic book artist.

== Biography ==
Born in Montréal in 1973, Michel Lacombe is the creator of the self-published comics One Bloody Year, a four-episode vampire romance. He illustrated several Star Wars comics and Warrior Nun Areala.

Michel Lacombe has illustrated a couple of issues of Dark Horse's Star Wars Tales and Star Wars: Empire comics and Green Lantern for DC Comics. He was once also active in animation. Currently working on The Punisher, he is also publishing a webcomic, Jesus Monkey Pants In Space.

== Bibliography ==
Comics work includes:

- Star Wars Tales #21 (2004)
- Star Wars Tales #23 (2005)
- Star Wars: Empire #34: "In the Shadows of Their Fathers, Part 5" (2005)
  - Lacombe illustrated the final installment of the five-part story arc. The story follows the character of Princess Leia as she embarks on a mission to rescue her father, Darth Vader, from a group of Rebel Alliance fighters.
- Star Wars: Rebellion #0: "Crossroads" (2006)
  - Lacombe illustrated the one-shot prequel story. The story takes place between the events of the films Episode IV: A New Hope and Episode V: The Empire Strikes Back, and explores the character of Princess Leia as she tries to find a way to strike back against the Galactic Empire.
- Star Wars: Rebellion #3: "My Brother, My Enemy, Part 3" (2006)
  - Lacombe illustrated the third installment of the four-part story arc. The story follows the character of Luke Skywalker as he tries to rescue his friend and fellow Rebel Alliance fighter, Deena Shan, from the clutches of the Empire.
- Star Wars: Rebellion #6: "The Ahakista Gambit" (2007)
- Star Wars: Rebellion #7: "The Ahakista Gambit" pt.2 (2007)
- Star Wars: Rebellion #8 (2007)
- Star Wars: Rebellion #9 (2007)
- Star Wars: Rebellion #10 (2007)
- Star Wars: Rebellion Vol. 2 "The Ahakista Gambit" TPB (2008)
- Punisher: Force of Nature #1 (2008)
- Cable #6 (2008)
- Wolverine Origins #31 (2008)
- Wolverine Origins #32 (2009)
- Punisher: Frank Castle #66 (2009)
- Punisher: Frank Castle #67 (2009)
- Punisher: Frank Castle #68 (2009)
- Punisher: Frank Castle #69 (2009)
- Punisher: Frank Castle #70 (2009)
- Dark X-Men: The Beginning #2 (2009)
- Cable Vol. 2: Waiting for the End of the World (2009)
- Dark X-Men: The Confession #1 (2009)
- Wolverine Weapon X #6 (2009)
- Wolverine Weapon X #7 (2009)
- Wolverine Weapon X #8 (2009)
- Wolverine Weapon X #9 (2009)
- Second Coming: Prepare #1 (2010)
- Avengers/Uncanny X-Men: Utopia (2010)
- X-Men Legacy #234 (2010)
- Age of Heroes #3 (2010)
- Dark Wolverine #90 (2010)
- Loki #3 (2011)
- X-Men #11 (2011)
- Avengers Origins: Thor #1 (2011)
- Star Wars Omnibus: The Other Sons of Tatooine TPB (2012)
- X-Men #24 (2012)
- Punisher Max: The Complete Collection Vol. 5 (2017)
- Star Wars Legends Epic Collection: The Rebellion Vol. 3 (2019)
- Star Wars Legends Epic Collection: The Rebellion Vol. 4 (2020)
- X-Men Milestones: Necrosha (2020)
- X-Men Milestones: Second Coming TPB (2020)
- Star Wars Legends: The New Republic Omnibus Vol. 1 (2023)
- Star Wars Legends: The Rebellion Omnibus Vol. 2 (2023)

== See also ==
- Bande dessinée
- Canadian comics
- Quebec comic strips
