= Heroes Unlimited =

Tabletop role-playing game

- Front cover of Heroes Unlimited, Revised Second Edition, illustrated by Jim Steranko
- Designers: Kevin Siembieda, Carmen Bellaire, Wayne Breaux Jr., Bill Coffin, Kevin Long, et al.
- Publishers: Palladium Books
- Publication: August 1984 (1st edition); April 1987 (Rev. edition); January 1993 (rev. 9th print); March 1998 (2nd edition)
- Years active: 1984–present
- Genres: Superhero
- Languages: English
- Systems: Megaversal
- Website: palladiumbooks.com

Heroes Unlimited is a superhero role-playing game written by Kevin Siembieda and first published by Palladium Books in 1984. The game is based upon the Palladium Books Megaversal system and is compatible with other games that use the Palladium system.

== Description ==
Heroes Unlimited features superheroes fighting supervillains in a comic book-like world. The game's introduction states that the game was designed to be a "thinking man's" superhero role-playing game where the characters were vulnerable and could not amass an incredible number of skills or abilities. The experience point-system of the game allowed users to defeat one's enemies with heroic sacrifice. Characters in the game are defined by "the eight attributes", skills (dependent on education level), and class, which allows the selection of certain powers or enhanced skills or equipment. The classes include super-powered beings to aliens to technology-based or special-training-based characters. Some classes and super-powers (such as the ancient master class or invulnerability powers) start powerful but do not mature, while other classes and powers have effects strongly tied to character level.

The second edition of the game added updates to the previous supplements, in addition to the new play options, along with several new supplements produced by Palladium Books. This edition added new powers and minor rule changes which allowed users to expand play options by adding superpowers to classes, the introduction of the "crazy" heroes option, and added magic-powered characters to the game at the request of the players. The revised edition also included a short rules summary of the Palladium game Teenage Mutant Ninja Turtles & Other Strangeness, adding mutant animal character rules and a shortened selection of animals for character creation. The mutant animal characters are generally weaker than standard heroes as the TMNT supplement Turtles Go Hollywood noted.

== Publication history ==
Heroes Unlimited was first published by Palladium Books in 1984 and revised in 1987. A second edition was published in 1998.

=== Sourcebooks ===
1. The Justice Machine — first printing in 1985
2. Villains Unlimited — first printing in 1992 (revised for Heroes Unlimited, 2nd Edition, 1999)
3. Aliens Unlimited — first printing in 1994 (revised for Heroes Unlimited, 2nd Edition, 1999)
4. Gamemaster's Guide — first printing June 1999
5. Century Station — first printing February 2000
6. Gramercy Island — first printing November 2000
7. Aliens Unlimited Galaxy Guide — first printing May 2001
8. Mutant Underground — first printing February 2003
9. Powers Unlimited — first printing June 2003
10. Powers Unlimited 2 — first printing February 2004
11. Powers Unlimited 3 — first printing August 2006
12. Armageddon Unlimited — first printing February 2011 (ties in with the Megaverse-wide Minion War)

== Related ==
- "Ninjas & Superspies" includes rules on buying martial arts forms with Heroes Unlimited characters.
- "Rifts Conversion Book" includes notes on modifications to Heroes Unlimited characters.
- "Skraypers", a Rifts (role-playing game) Dimension Book (the 4th) was co-designed as a Heroes Unlimited sourcebook.

== Reception ==
William A. Barton reviewed Heroes Unlimited in Space Gamer No. 72. Barton commented that "if you desire hero-types like Batman, Captain America, Robotman, or Wolverine, Heroes Unlimited is a superbuy, even if you use it as nothing more than a sourcebook for an existing game".

Russell Grant Collins reviewed Heroes Unlimited for Different Worlds magazine and stated that "All in all, I cannot recommend this game over any of the other superhero games currently on the market. Only a super-completist should pick it up."

In his 1990 book The Complete Guide to Role-Playing Games, game critic Rick Swan thought this game had "an appealing, versatile system, though it's also unfocused and a little bland." Swan noted that mutant and alien heroes had a large advantage over heroes from Earth, and commented, "it makes for an unbalanced role-playing game." Swan concluded by giving the game a rating of 2.5 out of 4, saying, "It's an excellent source of ideas, however, especially the sections on robotics and equipment, and makes a nice supplement for any of the other superhero games."

In a 1996 readers' poll by British games magazine Arcane to determine the 50 most popular roleplaying games of all time, Heroes Unlimited was ranked 40th. Editor Paul Pettengale commented: "Superhero roleplaying for the Palladium player, but not all that easy to pick up".

== Reviews ==
- Comics Feature #37
