= Don Hillsman II =

American penciller and inker

- Occupations: Penciller and inker, professional skateboarder

Don Hillsman II is a professional penciller and inker. He has worked for comic book companies such as DC Comics, Marvel Comics, CrossGen, Dark Horse Comics, Caliber Comics and others.

== Bibliography ==
=== Comics ===
- X-Men
- Demon Storm
- Spawn pinups
- Decimation
- Edge 1–6,8–9, 11–12
- Gambit: Hath No Fury
- Gambit: House of Cards
- House Of M: Fantastic 4 and Iron Man
- New X-Men: Academy X 3: X-Posed
- Scion 1: Conflict of Conscience
- Scion 2: Blood for Blood

=== Books ===
- Horrors of the Wasted West (Deadlands: Hell on Earth) (2002) Pinnacle Entertainment Group—Interior Artist
- Way of the Dead, The (Deadlands: The Weird West) (2002) Pinnacle Entertainment Group—Cover Artist
- Marshal's Handbook, Revised Ed. (Deadlands: The Weird West) (2001) Pinnacle Entertainment Group—Interior Artist

=== Skateboarding ===
Don Hillsman II is also a professional Skateboarder who was sponsored by Converse and a few more companies and has gone to several countries for skate contests in the late 1980s and early-mid 1990s.
