= Purging (manufacturing) =

Cleaning process of plastics manufacturing

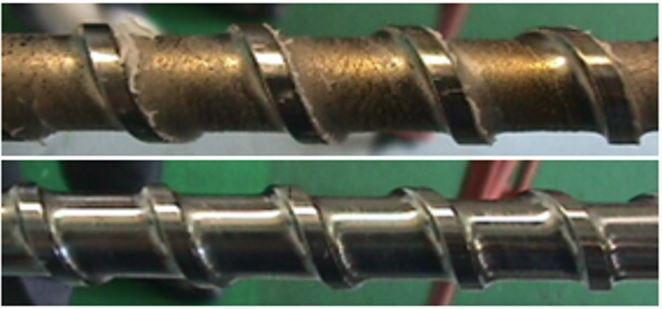
- Before and after purging image of injection molding machine screw
- Process type: Cleaning process of Injection moulding

Purging is a cleaning process of injection molding to clean thermoplastics molding machines and extruders. This process is very important as a virgin resin cannot effectively remove previous resin residuals from the previous run.

== Method ==
Below are the major steps for purging-

- Turn off the material flow in the injection molding machine
- Turn off the colorant flow which is added or applied in order to change the colour of a material
- Maintain existing process settings and continue manufacturing plastics parts
- When last part is completed, set the nozzle retraction mode
- Clean hopper and colorant blender (whichever necessary)
- Load any commercial purging material or new material to be used into hopper feed zone
- Clean nozzle and sprue bushing by making few shots
- Continue purging until most of the commercial purging material is out of the hopper
- Feed at least one injection capacity of the next production resin to rinse out any residuals
- Start the next production with new resin
