= Adventure Publications =

Defunct American comic book publisher

- Industry: Comics
- Founded: 1986; 40 years ago
- Founder: Steve Milo
- Defunct: 1993; 33 years ago
- Headquarters: Fairfax, Virginia
- Owner: Marvel Comics
- Parent: Malibu Comics

Adventure Publications was an American comic book publisher founded by Steve Milo in 1986, based in Fairfax, Virginia and active from 1986 to 1993. In 1989, it merged with American publisher Malibu Comics, becoming the Adventure Comics imprint.

== Company history ==
Founded in May 1986 by Steve Milo, the company was named for its first book, The Adventurers, initially published by Canadian comics publisher Aircel. After the first two issues, Adventure Publications began publishing independently with a second printing of the first two issues, now cover titled simply Adventurers (though the indicia would retain The Adventurers usage through issue five).

By March 1988, the company had five titles (Adventurers, Elf Warrior, Ninja Elite, Star Rangers, and Warriors) and had grown to the seventh largest of the approximately one-hundred comic publishers in the US. In January of 1989, Adventure Publications was acquired by American publisher Malibu Comics, which had previously acquired Aircel in October 1988. It continued as the Adventure Comics imprint of Malibu until 1993.

== Titles published ==
- Alien Nation
  - The Spartans (1990), #1–4
  - A Breed Apart (1990–1991), #1–4
  - The Firstcomers (1991), #1–4
  - The Skin Trade (1991), #1–4
  - The Public Enemy (1991–1992), #1–4
  - The Lost Episode (1992), #1
- Ape Nation (1991), #1–4 (an Alien Nation/Planet of the Apes crossover)
- Adventurers
  - Book I (1986–1987), #0–10 [reprinting and continuing from The Adventurers (1986), #1–2 from Aircel]
  - Book II (1987–1988), #1–6
  - Book III (1989–1990), #1–6
  - Crimson Letters (1990), #1
- Adventures of Roger Wilco (1992), #1–3
- Badaxe (1989), #1–3
- The Bat (1992), #1
- Death Hawk (1988), #1–3
- Deathworld
  - Book I (1990–1991), #1–4
  - Book II (1991), #1–4
  - Book III (1991), #1–4
- The Defenseless Dead (1991), #1–3
- Demon's Tails (1993), #1–4
- Dracula: The Suicide Club (1992). #1–4 (reprinted by Caliber Comics in 2017)
- Elf Warrior (1987–1988), #1–3 [continued in #4 (1988) at Quadrant]
- Evil Ernie (1992), Special Limited Edition #1 [reprints Evil Ernie (1991), #1 from Eternity Comics with additional material]
- From the Darkness (1990–1991), #1–4 [continued in From the Darkness Book II: Blood Vows (1992–1993), #1–3 at Cry For Dawn Productions]
- Lovecraft in Full Color (1991–1992), #1–4
- Jeremiah
  - Birds of Prey (1991), #1–2 [translates Jeremiah 1: La Nuit des rapaces (1979)]
  - A Fistful of Sand (1991), #1–2 [translates Jeremiah 2: Du sable plein les dents (1979)]
  - The Heirs (1991), #1–2 [translates Jeremiah 3: Les Héritiers Sauvages (1980)]
- Livingstone Mountain (1991), #1–4
- Logan's Run (1991), #1–6
- Logan's World (1991), #1–6
- Merlin
  - v1 (1990–1991), #1–6
  - Idylls of The King (1992), #1–2
- Miss Fury (1991), #1–4
- Monsters from Outer Space (1992–1993), #1–3
- NetherWorlds (1988), #1
- Ninja Elite (1987–1988), #1–8
- Paranoia (1991–1992), #1–6
- Peter Pan: The Return to Never-Never Land (1991), #1–2
- Planet of the Apes
  - v1 (1990–1992), #1–24 + Annual (1991)
  - Ape City (1990), #1–4
  - Urchak's Folly (1991), #1–4
  - Terror on the Planet of the Apes (1991), #1–4 [reprints chapters from Curtis Magazines' Planet of the Apes #1–4 (1974–1977)]
  - Blood of the Apes (1991–1992), #1–4
  - Sins of the Father (1992), #1
  - The Forbidden Zone (1992), #1–4
- Re-Animator
  - ...in Full Color (1991), #1–3 (film adaptation)
  - Tales of Herbert West (1991) [reprints the text of "Herbert West–Reanimator" (1922) from Home Brew magazine, with illustrations]
  - Dawn of the Re-Animator (1992), #1–4 (film prequel)
- Retief
  - v1 (1989–1990), #1–6
  - Retief and the Warlords (1991), #1–4
  - Diplomatic Immunity (1991), #1–2
  - The Giant Killer (1991), #1
  - The Garbage Invasion (1991), #1
  - Grime & Punishment (1991), #1
- Rocket Ranger (1991–1992), #1–5
- Rust v3 (1992), #1–4 [from Rust v2 (1989), #1–7 from NOW Comics]
- Sinbad
  - Book I: The Four Trials (1989–1990), #1—4
  - Book II: In the House of God (1991), #1–4
- Star Rangers (1987–1988), #1–4
- Torg (1992), #1–4
- Velvet (1993), #1–4
- Warriors (1987–1988), #1–5
