= Star Wars: Purge =

Purge

Publication information
- Subject: Star Wars
- Genre: Science fiction
- Format: One-shot
- Release date(s): 28 December 2005
- Country: United States
- Language: English
- No. of pages: 32

Expanded Universe
- Era: Prequel
- Galactic Year: 19 BBY
- Canon: C
- Preceded by: Loyalties
- Followed by: Evasive Action: Recruitment

Creative team
- Script writer: John Ostrander
- Cover artist(s): Adam Hughes
- Penciller(s): Doug Wheatley
- Inker(s): Doug Wheatley
- Colorist(s): Ronda Pattison
- Letterer(s): Michael David Thomas
- Designer(s): Tina Alessi
- Art director(s): Lia Ribacchi
- Editor(s): Randy Stradley
- Assistant editor(s): Dave Marshall
- Associate editor(s): Jeremy Barlow
- Publisher(s): Dark Horse Comics

Star Wars: Purge is a comic book one-shot released on December 28, 2005 by Dark Horse Comics. The story was written by John Ostrander, and the art was done by Doug Wheatley. The events depicted take place in the Star Wars galaxy approximately one month after the events in Revenge of the Sith.

== Synopsis ==
On the Outer Rim planet Eriadu, clone troopers search for the Jedi Master Tsui Choi. Choi ambushes and defeats them, then meets Bultar Swan, another Jedi survivor. Meanwhile, on Coruscant, Darth Vader kills Jedi Dama Montalvo after he refused to give up the location of Obi-Wan Kenobi. Afterwards, a clone trooper informs Vader that Imperial spies have information of a Jedi gathering on Kessel.

Bultar and Tsui join the other six Jedi at the gathering organized by Shadday Potkin. The Jedi begin to debate about what should be done about the Empire and the purge of their order. Koffi Arana proposes utilizing the dark side of the Force to stop Vader. While pondering the proposal, they sense the dark presence of Darth Vader. Secretly, Shadday lured Vader to Kessel by spreading rumors that Obi-Wan would attend, hoping that the Jedi will trap and overwhelm him.

Vader quickly kills Jedi Sia-Lann Wezz and Ma'kis'shaalas. Shaddy corners Vader and uses her cortosis-weave blade—capable of temporarily shorting out lightsabers—but is killed by Vader. Vader then uses the blade to disable the lightsabers of Roblio Darté, Jastus Farr, and Arana. Tsui Choi severs Vader's right hand, and he seemingly surrenders. Arana insists that Vader is insincere, but Bultar points out that Jedi do not take the lives of unarmed opponents. Arana strikes Bultar down and lunges at Vader. Using the force, Vader uses the cortosis blade to kill Arana. Darté, Farr, and Choi hurl debris at Vader, incapacitating him. However, a contingent of clone troopers fires at the Jedi, killing Farr. Choi attempts to distract the troopers to help Darté escape, but both are shot down. Vader returns to Coruscant, where his narrow-escape is propagandized into a rumor that Vader killed 50 Jedi singlehandedly.

== Sequels ==
Another one-shot, titled Purge: Seconds to Die, was released by Dark Horse on November 11, 2009; it was written by John Ostrander, with art by Jim Hall and Alex Lei. Additionally, Purge: The Hidden Blade was released on April 7, 2010; it was written by W. Haden Blackman with art by Chris Scalf. Purge: The Tyrant's Fist was a two-part series released in December 2012 and January 2013; it was written by Alexander Freed with art by Marco Castiello and Andrea Chella. The entire five-part series was collected in a trade paperback in July 2013 and in the Star Wars Legends Marvel Epic Collection The Empire, released in April 2015.
