= Mark Ellis (American author) =

American novelist and comic-book writer

Mark Ellis is an American novelist/graphic novelist, journalist, and comics creator who under the pen name James Axler has written scores of books for the Outlanders and Deathlands paperback novel series as well as numerous other books under his own name.

== Career ==
In 1980, Ellis married Melissa Martin, a graphic designer, photographer and writer who served as his business partner. He began working as a full-time writer in 1986.

A busy comics creator in the 1980s and 90s, Ellis created the popular Death Hawk character and also developed/created Star Rangers, Ninja Elite, The Justice Machine, as well as working on such popular properties as Doc Savage, The Man From U.N.C.L.E., H.P. Lovecraft's Cthulhu, The Green Hornet, and The Wild Wild West.

=== Millennium Publications ===
In 1990, Ellis co-founded Millennium Publications, serving as editor, with his wife and co-founder Melissa Martin as vice-president and art director. Millennium gave early exposure to comics artists such as Mike Wieringo and Darryl Banks, and utilized industry veterans Jim Mooney and Don Heck. Projects included The Wild, Wild West, a four-part series based on the classic TV show, H. P. Lovecraft's Cthulhu: The Whisperer in Darkness and a twelve-issue adaptation of Anne Rice's The Mummy or Ramses the Damned among many others.

For Millennium, Ellis conceived and scripted Nosferatu: Plague of Terror, a four-part series that provided a complete story of the title character's origin quite apart from the Dracula legend. Ellis also adapted the horror film It! The Terror from Beyond Space into comics. Working with artist Darryl Banks he adapted the pulp fiction hero Doc Savage into the four-part miniseries Doc Savage: The Monarch of Armageddon.

The Comics Buyer's Guide Catalog of Books referred to the Ellis/Banks version of Doc Savage as having "come[s] closest to the original, capturing all the action, humanity, and humor of the original novels".

=== "Outlanders" and James Axler ===
In 1995, Ellis began writing action-adventure novels for Harlequin Enterprises Gold Eagle imprint, first for the long-running Mack Bolan franchise and the post-apocalyptic Deathlands series.

In 1996 under the house pseudonym of "James Axler", he created the best-selling Outlanders series, the first entry of which was released in 1997. With the cancellation of the Gold Eagle imprint at the end of 2015, Outlanders concluded its 18.5 year run, making it the most successful mass-market paperback series of the last 35 years. Combined with the audio book editions, Outlanders comprises well over 100 novels. Although the Axler pseudonym was shared with other writers, primarily the multiple contributors to Gold Eagle's Deathlands series, Ellis authored more novels as "James Axler" than any other writer.

=== Graphic novels ===
In 2008, Ellis co-authored The Everything Guide to Writing Graphic Novels with Melissa Martin (published by Simon & Schuster). The book led to several of his earlier comic series being compiled as graphic novel editions by publishers such as Caliber Comics/Transfuzion, Markosia and Ying Ko Graphics.

== Bibliography ==
=== As James Axler ===
- Stoneface (1996)
- Demons of Eden (1997)
- Nightmare Passage (1997)
- Exile to Hell (1997)
- Destiny Run (1997)
- Savage Sun (1997)
- Omega Path (1998)
- Parallax Red (1998)
- Doomstar Relic (1998)
- Iceblood (1998)
- Hellbound Fury (The Lost Earth Saga, Book 1) (1999)
- Night Eternal (The Lost Earth Saga, Book 2) (with Mel Odom) (1999)
- Outer Darkness (The Lost Earth Saga, Book 3) (1999)
- Armageddon Axis (1999)
- Encounter (Deathlands Collectors Edition with Laurence James & Alan Philipson) (1999)
- Wreath of Fire (with Mel Odom) (2000)
- Shadow Scourge (2000)
- Hell Rising (2000)
- Doom Dynasty (The Imperator Wars, Book 1) (2000)
- Tigers of Heaven (The Imperator Wars, Book 2) (2001)
- Purgatory Road (The Imperator Wars, Book 3) (2001)
- Tomb of Time (2001)
- Devil in the Moon (The Dragon Kings, Book 1) (2002)
- Dragoneye (The Dragon Kings, Book 2) (2002)
- Far Empire (2002)
- Equinox Zero (2002)
- Talon and Fang (Heart of the World, Book 1) (2003)
- Sea of Plague (Heart of the World, Book 2) (2003)
- Mad God's Wrath (2004)
- Mask of The Sphinx (with Chris Van Deelen) (2004)
- Evil Abyss (2005)
- Children of The Serpent (2005)
- Cerberus Storm (2005)
- Aftermath (2006)
- Rim of The World (2006)
- Hydra's Ring (2006)
- Skull Throne (2007)
- Satan's Seed (2007)
- Dark Goddess (2007)
- Grailstone Gambit (2008)
- Ghostwalk (2008)
- Warlord of the Pit (2009)
- Audio Guide to Outlanders (2011)

=== Other books ===
- Shreek Show (1989) Audio Book
- Hellfire Trigger (1998) — a Mack Bolan novel
- Devil's Guard (1998) — a Mack Bolan novel
- The Everything Guide to Writing Graphic Novels (with Melissa Martin) (2008)
- Cryptozoica (2010)
- The Green Hornet Chronicles (2010)
- The Avenger The Justice Inc. Files (2011)
- The Spur: Loki's Rock (2012)
- The Falcon Resurrected (2014)
- The Spur: Helldorado (2016)
- Parallax Prime: Of Dire Chimeras (2017)
- Knightwatch: Invictus X (2019)
- Call Sign Cerberus (2020)
- Remo Williams, The Destroyer: The Adventures Continue (2024)
- 221B: On Her Majesty's Secret Service (2025)— a Sherlock Holmes novel

=== Comics and graphic novels ===
- Lakota: Serpents of Aztlan (2023) Markosia Enterprises
- King Solomon's Mines: Expanded Edition (2022) (Markosia Enterprises)
- Nosferatu: Sovereign of Terror (2021) (Markosia Enterprises)
- Lakota (2021) (Markosia Enterprises)
- Death Hawk: The Complete Saga (2019) (Markosia Enterprises)
- King Solomon's Mines (2015) (Ying Ko Graphics)
- The Justice Machine: Object of Power (2014) (Bluewater Productions)
- Death Hawk: The Soulworm Saga (2008) (Millennial Concepts/Transfuzion)
- H.P. Lovecraft's The Miskatonic Project: The Whisperer in Darkness (2008) (Millennial Concepts/Transfuzion)
- Mr. Holmes & Dr. Watson: Their Strangest Cases (2008) (Millennial Concepts/Transfuzion)
- The New Justice Machine:Top Gear Edition, Volume One (2009) (Millennial Concepts)
- H.P. Lovecraft's The Miskatonic Project: Bride of Dagon (2009) (Millennial Concepts/Transfuzion)
- Nosferatu: Plague of Darkness (2009) (Millennial Concepts)
- The Saint: The Man Who Was Clever (2012) (Moonstone)
- BeeComing Sophie (2013) (Bee Conscious Publications)
- The Justice Machine: (Innovation)
- Wally Wood's T.H.U.N.D.E.R. Agents (Deluxe)
- Star Rangers (Adventure Publications)
- Ninja Elite (Adventure Publications)
- Warriors (Adventure Publications)
- Death Hawk (Adventure Publications)
- Netherworlds (Adventure Publications)
- Adventurers Book II (Adventure Publications)
- The New Justice Machine, Volume One (Innovation)
- Angry Shadows (Innovation)
- The Wild Wild West (Millennium Publications)
- Doc Savage (Millennium Publications)
- H.P. Lovecraft's Cthulhu (Millennium Publications)
- The Mummy Archives (Millennium Publications)
- Weird Tales Illustrated (Millennium Publications)
- The Justice Machine, Volume Two (Millennium Publications)
- It! The Terror from Beyond Space (Millennium Publications)
- The Man From U.N.C.L.E. (Millennium Publications)
- Nosferatu: Plague of Terror (Millennium Publications)
- The Collector's Dracula (Millennium Publications)
- Paladin Alpha (Firstlight Publications)
- Thresherz (Firstlight Publications)
- R.A.Z.E. (Firstlight Publications)
