= Justice Machine =

Fictional team of superheroes

Publication information
- Publisher: Noble Comics; Texas Comics; Comico Comics; Innovation Publishing; Millennium Publications; Bluewater Productions
- First appearance: Justice Machine No. 1 (Noble Comics, June 1981)
- Created by: Mike Gustovich

In-story information
- Base(s): Earth, formerly Georwell
- Member(s): Challenger; Diviner; Titan; Blazer; Demon; Chain; Talisman; Youthquake; Ms. Liberty

The Justice Machine is a fictional team of superheroes originally created by Mike Gustovich and appearing in comic books from many small publishers in the 1980s and 1990s. In addition to Gustovich, writers Jenny Blake Isabella and Mark Ellis have also had lengthy creative associations with Justice Machine.

== Publication history ==
=== Volume one ===
1981–1983 (Noble Comics)

The characters debuted in Justice Machine No. 1 (June 1981), created by writer-penciller Mike Gustovich, published by the small independent publisher Noble Comics, with a cover penciled by John Byrne and inked by Gustovich. The Justice Machine series lasted five issues, cover-dated June 1981, Winter 1981, April 1982, Fall 1982, and Winter 1983. The first three issues were published in magazine format, with the fourth and fifth issues appearing in traditional comic-size format. The final two issues were also flip books with another Gustovich property, Cobalt Blue. Noble Comics folded after the publication of Justice Machine No. 5.

1983 (Texas Comics)

A new publisher, Texas Comics, (Note: Texas Comics, based in Houston, was the creation of a few comic book fans who had previously worked together on a fanzine called Comics Informer. The company operated out of the offices of the retailer Camelot Comics.) licensed the characters from Gustovich, putting out Justice Machine Annual No. 1 in 1983. The annual featured a crossover with the then-defunct Tower Comics' superhero team T.H.U.N.D.E.R. Agents, by writer William Messner-Loebs (as Bill Loeb) and penciler Bill Reinhold. A second story, by writer-penciler Bill Willingham, introduced the superhero team the Elementals.

Texas Comics had planned to bring out a bimonthly Justice Machine series, but in the end produced only one comic before it too folded.

=== Volume two ===
1986–1989 (Comico)

In 1986, Comico: The Comic Company revived Justice Machine — and the Elementals — putting out a limited series, Justice Machine Featuring the Elementals #1-4 (May-Aug. 1986), by writer Willingham and artist Gustovich, which rebooted the series' continuity from the original Noble Comics/Texas Comics series.

Comico subsequently published an ongoing Justice Machine series (vol. 2) that lasted 29 issues (Jan. 1987–May 1989), plus a 1989 annual. That series' initial creative team consisted of writer Tony Isabella co-plotting with artist Gustovich (who stayed on for the whole series). Picking up from the end of the Justice Machine Featuring the Elementals, the ongoing title became one of Comico's best-selling series, selling upwards of 70,000 copies of each issue at its peak. Other writers on vol. 2 included Doug Murray (issues #14–26) and Michael Eury (issues #20–29).

1989–1991 (Innovation Publishing)

Innovation Publishing published a three-issue limited series, The New Justice Machine (Nov. 1989–March 1990), by Mark Ellis with pencils by Darryl Banks and others, and inks by Gustovich. An accompanying one-shot, Justice Machine Summer Spectacular No. 1 (Summer 1990), by writer Messner-Loebs and penciler Reinhold, contained a story that had originally been created for publication by Texas Comics in 1983.

=== Volume three ===
Innovation followed the limited series with a new ongoing series, Justice Machine vol. 3, which ran seven issues (April 1990–April 1991), as well as the one-shot Hero Alliance & Justice Machine: Identity Crisis #1 (September 1990), by writer Ellis, pencilers Banks and Rik Levins, and inker Gustovich. Initially produced by Ellis and Banks, the series acquired creator Gustovich as both penciler and inker for issues #4-6, and Isabella as writer for the final three issues.

=== Volume four ===
1992 (Millennium Publications)

Ellis' Millennium Publications produced two issues of a fourth volume (Oct. & Dec. 1992), by writer Ellis and penciler Banks. These feature updated versions of the characters. Ellis had purchased the Justice Machine rights from Gustovich in 1991. This would be the last new appearance of the Justice Machine for over 20 years.

=== Later developments ===
2009 (Millennial Concepts)

The New Justice Machine: High Gear Edition, Volume One was released by Ellis' Millennial Concepts and Gary Reed's Transfuzion Publishing in March 2009. The compilation volume collected the New Justice Machine limited series and the first issue of the regular series published by Innovation. Volume 2 was announced but never produced.

2014 (Bluewater Productions)

Object of Power, an original Justice Machine graphic novel by Ellis and artists David Enebral and Ivan Barriga, was published by Bluewater Productions in June 2014.

The Justice Machine is currently trademarked by George Sarantopoulos, publisher of It's Astounding.

== Fictional team history ==
In the first two versions of the team, the Justice Machine is an elite law enforcement agency from the planet Georwell, a parallel world with advanced technology that the Machine members believe is a utopia. "Georwell" is a play on George Orwell, the author of Nineteen Eighty-Four, and the society of Georwell is based on the society of the novel, though much more technically advanced.

Arriving on Earth in pursuit of Maxinor, a criminal and accused terrorist from their world, the team members soon discover that Georwell is much more fascist and dystopian than they had previously believed. Meanwhile, the Georwellian authorities have activated a second team, called The Guardians in the Noble Comics series, or the New Justice Machine in the Comico stories.

Zarren, their superior, recognizes that Georwell's government is corrupt, but he has no desire to change the system; he merely wants to advance to a position of more power. The Machine's idealism might interfere with Zarren's personal goals. He has the Machine indicted as traitors, and they have no choice but to remain on Earth. Later, Zarren falls victim to his own schemes and must flee to Earth, where he sets himself up as the president of a small South American island, the Arriba Atoll.

In "The Chimera Conspiracy", scripted by Mark Ellis and Darryl Banks, drawn by Banks, and published by Millennium Publications, it is revealed that Georwell is actually Earth in an alternate future, some 900 years hence. Rather than traveling from one dimension to another, the Justice Machine went sideways and backward in time, drawn to a temporal nexus point where the events which eventually create Georwell are in a state of flux.

== Characters ==
The Justice Machine

- Challenger (Jaiime Conrad) is the leader, physically adept and a skilled strategist, effectively the Georwellian military version of Batman/Captain America. He is very conscious of his age and declining physical abilities, although Georwellians live considerably longer than Terrans. He makes extensive use of gadgets, most of which he invented himself, to augment his declining physical powers.
- Blazer (Mitrian Fynn) was initially thought to be daughter of Light-Wave, the leader of an earlier version of the Justice Machine, and Masha Fynn, the Flame, a member of that earlier version of the Machine, but it was later revealed that she is actually Challenger's daughter. Experiments performed on her in the womb gave her greater powers than her mother, but she must wear a protective suit to prevent her thermal powers overloading and causing a fiery cataclysm. Later, a Terran scientist from New Atlantis implants devices in her nervous system that allow her to exert more control over her powers.
- Titan (Jemin Osk) is mutant male, able to increase his height and mass to a maximum of 30 feet.
- Demon (Gabel Nevin): Highly trained (and egotistical) martial artist, Demon has an on-again, off-again addiction to the Georwellian drug Edge, which enhances a user's strength, speed, stamina, and ability to ignore pain but leaves the user virtually helpless when it wears off.
- Diviner (Tessei Molleng A-Conrad) is Challenger's (ex-) wife (but not Blazer's mother), at one time totally dependent on a body-suit for any of her senses, but consequently able to use those senses at paranormal levels. She is able to interface with electronic and digital technology.
- Talisman is a mutant with the power of karma: good things happen to him (and by extension to his teammates), while bad things happen to his foes, so long as his cause is righteous. He is a career criminal, fraudster and gambler. Due to some unrevealed trauma, he becomes a clergyman.
- Chain (Kristin "Krista" Clay) is an African-American woman who gained psionic abilities which she channels through her light chainsaw. Introduced in the Innovation mini-series, she is the team's first earth-born member.

Allies

- Maxinor is a rebel against the oppressive regime of Georwell. Initially an enemy of the Justice Machine, he and the Justice Machine eventually become allies.
- Youthquake is Maxinor's son and a mute youth with the power to control quakes. He falls in love with Blazer, and the two of them marry. Eventually, Blazer gives birth to their son.
- Free Force are super-powered members of the New Atlantis security force, consisting of Havoc, Night Owl and Controller.
- Ms. Liberty is from Earth, and she is a highly skilled athlete, performer and escape artist.
- Jubal Woolcott is a founder of the Justice Institute, a private law university near Alexandria, Virginia. The Justice Machine takes up more or less permanent residence on the campus.

Enemies

The Guardians

- Id is a bodiless intellect which led the remaining members of the group.
- Night Lightning is a mutant with the ability to generate and expel electrical energy.
- Phaser is a mutant able to phase his body out of solidity.
- Monolith is Titan's jealous brother, able to grow slightly more but starting out with less intellect.
- Crusader is a slightly less effective Challenger.
- Manslaughter is a man-hating, amazon-like warrior, armed with a ball-and-chain weapon.
- Fist is large muscle-bound ex-criminal, used for wetwork (killing) operations.

Department Z

- An organization of super-powered operatives who work for Zarren, the core group consists of The Directress (also known as Ms. Liberty), Skrapiron, Aquinox, Heavyhand and Ornithon.

Independent Operators

- Zarren is former Chief Prosecutor of Georwell and the Justice Machine's most implacable foe. He was stripped of his rank after the failure of the Georwellian invasion. He wore an eyepatch during his initial introduction and appearances in the series, but after he was stripped of his rank his remaining eye was removed which may imply how he lost his first eye. He later made his way to Earth and eventually set himself up as the dictator of the small island nation of the Arriba Atoll.
- Dark Force is dedicated to destruction of the Georwellian government, willing to work with the Machine to suit its needs, but it is later revealed to be an armored suit used by a young girl (Tana Moshe) in the villain's first incarnation. Upon the entity's return in "The Chimera Conspiracy", Darkforce is obviously an entity of energy.

== Other media ==
The Justice Machine was the subject of The Justice Machine sourcebook for the role-playing game Heroes Unlimited, published by Palladium Books. This version was based solely on the Noble Comics version, but includes details of storylines and characters stretching beyond the comic-published material.

== Bibliography ==
- Justice Machine vol. 1, #1–5 (Noble Comics, June 1981–Winter 1983)
- Justice Machine Annual No. 1 (Texas Comics, 1983)
- Justice Machine Featuring the Elementals #1-4 (Comico, May-Aug. 1986)
- Justice Machine vol. 2, #1–29 plus a 1989 annual (Comico, Jan. 1987–May 1989)
- The New Justice Machine #1–3 (Innovation Publishing, Nov. 1989–March 1990)
- Justice Machine Summer Spectacular No. 1 (Innovation, Summer 1990)
- Justice Machine vol. 3, #1–7 (Innovation, April 1990–April 1991)
- Hero Alliance & Justice Machine: Identity Crisis #1 (Innovation, September 1990)
- Justice Machine vol. 4, issues #1–2 (Millennium Publications, Oct.–Dec. 1992)
- The New Justice Machine: High Gear Edition, Volume One (Millennial Concept/Transfuzion Publishing, March 2009)
- Object of Power (Bluewater Productions, June 2014)
