= Darryl Banks =

American comic book artist

- Areas: Penciller, inker
- Notable works: Green Lantern vol 3

Darryl Banks is an American comic book artist. He worked on one of the first painted comic books, Cyberpunk, and teamed with the writer Mark Ellis to revamp the long-running The Justice Machine series for two publishers, Innovation and Millennium.

== Early life ==
Darryl Banks was born in Ohio to Aubrey Banks and Mary Banks (née Fowler). He studied at the Columbus College of Art and Design in Ohio and graduated from Columbus Eastmoor High School.

== Comics ==
After Banks graduated from college, he sent copious samples of his art to DC Comics and Marvel Comics, and went to comics conventions to show his work to publishers. On the advice of friends, he began sending samples to smaller, independent companies. Eventually, Innovation Publishing offered him his first jobs: a two-part Cyberpunk story, followed by a run on Justice Machine.

At Millennium, Banks produced a three-issue mini-series based on The Wild Wild West TV series and a comics adaptation of Doc Savage with The Monarch of Armageddon.

Banks then went to work for DC Comics, illustrating Legion of Super-Heroes. He then became the penciler on Green Lantern vol. 3, starting with the "Emerald Twilight" storyline. Banks drew most of the issues from #50 through #142. Along with co-creating Kyle Rayner, he was responsible for designing costumes for Parallax, Grayven, Fatality, Doctor Polaris, and Doctor Light.

As of 1995 Banks was teaching two courses, one on illustration and one in comic book design at his alma mater, the Columbus College of Art and Design.
