= Sell-through =

Economic principle

Sell-through is the percentage of a product that is sold by a retailer after being shipped by its supplier, typically expressed as a percentage. Net sales essentially refers to the same thing, in absolute numbers. Sell-through is calculated during a period (usually 1 month).

Sell through refers to sales made directly (direct sales). Sell in, on the other hand, refers to sales made through a channel.

== Example ==
Before the rise of the direct market, American comic books were sold to news agents through distributors in anticipation that a significant portion of the print run would eventually be unsold, then returned to the distributors who invalidated each returned copy by deliberately damaging the cover for return to the publisher for refunds where the material was pulped. Thus the business goal of the publisher would be to attempt to minimise those returns to maximise their income. By that measure, a sell-through percentage of a print run of roughly 50% was considered break-even by the standard fiscal measures of the comic book market.

When Marvel Comics came to prominence under Stan Lee's new artistic direction in the early 1960s, his publishing line by title quantity was highly restricted because their distributor was Independent News, owned by National Periodical Publications (Now DC Comics). However, although Marvel's titles could not compete with National in absolute volume of sales due to that restriction, the company's sell-through percentage soon caught National's attention in a way it could not ignore: Marvel's print runs were selling-through at 70% while National's were much closer to 50%. That meant that while Marvel's product might not have sold as much as National's in simple numbers, Marvel had to refund the distributors significantly less money for unsold product and thus was becoming much more profitable.

== See also ==
- Electronic sell-through
