= Fifty Who Made DC Great =

1985 DC Comics one-shot comic

- Fifty Who Made DC Great, cover art by Curt Swan, Murphy Anderson, and Arne Starr.

Publication information
- Publisher: DC Comics
- Format: One-shot
- Genre: Superhero
- Publication date: 1985
- No. of issues: 1

Creative team
- Written by: Joey Cavalieri; Thomas Hill; Barry Marx
- Artist: Steven Petruccio
- Editor: Barry Marx

Fifty Who Made DC Great is a one-shot published by DC Comics to commemorate the company's 50th anniversary in 1985. It was published in comic book format but contained text articles with photographs and background caricatures.

== Publication history ==
As explained by DC's then-President and Publisher Jenette Kahn, the profiles were of "fifty people and companies who have helped make DC Comics great. [W]e have chosen representatives from those who have pioneered new territory and who, by doing so, have shaped our past or our future". The articles were written by Barry Marx, Thomas Hill, and Joey Cavalieri and caricatures were provided by Steven Petruccio. Barry Marx was also the book's editor. Neal Pozner was the design director. The cover art, featuring Clark Kent holding the "DC Bullet", was drawn by Curt Swan, Murphy Anderson, and Arne Starr.

== The Fifty ==
Name	Field	Notes
M. C. Gaines	publisher	Co-owner of National Allied Publications.
Malcolm Wheeler-Nicholson	writer, entrepreneur	Founder of National Allied Publications, the precursor company to DC Comics.
Harry Donenfeld	publisher	Co-owner of National Allied Publications.
Jack Liebowitz	publisher	Co-owner of National Allied Publications.
Jerry Siegel	writer	Co-creator of Superman.
Joe Shuster	artist	Co-creator of Superman.
Bob Kane	writer, artist	Co-creator of Batman.
Bill Finger	writer	Co-creator of Batman.
Warner Publishing Services	distribution company	DC sister company responsible for newsstand distribution, formerly known as Independent News Company, Inc.
Sheldon Mayer	writer, artist, editor	Creator of Sugar and Spike.
Sol Harrison	executive	DC's president 1976-1980.
Erwin M. "Bud" Budner	distribution agent	Founder of Delmar News Agency.
Gardner Fox	writer	Co-creator of the Justice Society of America and the Justice League of America.
William Moulton Marston	writer	Co-creator of Wonder Woman with his wife Elizabeth Holloway Marston.
Emile Keirsbilk	publisher	Publisher of DC Comics in France.
Carroll Rheinstrom	publishing agent	Responsible for licensing DC's international publishing rights.
Fleischer Studios	animation studio	Produced the 1940s Superman cartoons.
Bud Collyer	actor	Portrayed Superman in the Adventures of Superman radio program, the Fleischer Studios 1940s cartoons and in the Filmation The New Adventures of Superman television series.
Kirk Alyn	actor	Portrayed Superman in the 1948 film serial Superman, and its 1950 sequel Atom Man Vs. Superman.
Mort Weisinger	editor	Editor of Superman during the mid-1950s to 1970; co-creator of Aquaman, Green Arrow, and Johnny Quick.
Whitney Ellsworth	writer, editor	Producer and story editor on the Adventures of Superman television series.
George Reeves	actor	Portrayed Superman in the Adventures of Superman television series.
Wayne Boring	artist	Artist on Superman from the late 1940s through the 1950s.
Curt Swan	artist	Artist most associated with Superman during the Silver and Bronze Ages of comic books.
Bernard Trout	editor	Editor of DC Comics in France.
World Color Press	printing company	In 1985, the largest player in the comic and newsstand special-interest publication market.
Robert Kanigher	writer, editor	Co-creator of Sgt. Rock.
Julius Schwartz	editor	Oversaw the revival of characters such as the Flash, Green Lantern, Hawkman, and the Atom; longtime editor of the Batman and Superman comic book lines.
Jerry Bails	popular culturist	A primary force in establishing 1960s comics fandom.
Roy Thomas	writer, editor	Co-creator of All-Star Squadron and Infinity, Inc.
Adam West	actor	Portrayed Batman in the 1960s television series.
Burt Ward	actor	Portrayed Robin in the Batman television series.
Licensing Company of America	licensing company	Merchandising rights for DC's characters.
Carmine Infantino	artist, executive	Co-creator of the Silver Age Flash; editorial director and publisher.
Neal Adams	artist	Artist of Batman and Green Lantern/Green Arrow features of the 1970s.
Denny O'Neil	writer, editor	Writer of Batman and Green Lantern/Green Arrow features of the 1970s.
Adolf Kabatek	publisher	Publisher of DC Comics in Germany.
Hanna-Barbera Productions	animation studio	Producer of the Super Friends television series.
Ilya Salkind	film producer	Co-producer of the Superman film series.
Alexander Salkind	film producer	Co-producer of the Superman film series.
Christopher Reeve	actor	Portrayed Superman in the film series.
Lynda Carter	actress	Portrayed Wonder Woman in the 1970s television series.
Phil Seuling	distributor, fan convention organizer	Developed the concept of the direct market distribution system for getting comics directly into comic book specialty shops.
Bud Plant	distributor	Early direct market distributor.
Marv Wolfman	writer, editor	Co-creator of the New Teen Titans, writer of Crisis on Infinite Earths.
George Pérez	artist	Co-creator of the New Teen Titans, artist of Crisis on Infinite Earths.
Frank Miller	writer, artist	Creator of Ronin.
Helen Slater	actress	Portrayed Supergirl in the 1984 film.
Superman Peanut Butter	product	DC's first food related licence.
Kenner Products	toy manufacturer	Manufacturer of the Super Powers Collection toyline.

== Celebrity reminiscences ==
Brief statements made by several prominent individuals were included as "Celebrity Reminiscences". These included comments by Daniel P. Moynihan, Richard Corben, Ray Bradbury, Gloria Steinem, Mort Walker, Milton Glaser, Walter Koenig, Gene Siskel, Stephen King, Gene Simmons, Jim Henson, David L. Wolper, Stan Lee, Susan Stamberg, Roger Ebert, Brooke Shields, Carol Bellamy, and Whoopi Goldberg.

== Legacy ==
Fifty Who Made DC Great has been used as a cited reference source for several books. Among these are the following:

- The All-Star Companion Volume 1 by Roy Thomas.
- Comic Book Nation: The Transformation of Youth Culture in America by Bradford W. Wright.
- American National Biography: Supplement by Paul R. Betz and Mark Christopher Carnes.
- Of Comics and Men: A Cultural History of American Comic Books by Jean-Paul Gabilliet, Bart Beaty, and Nick Nguyen.
- 75 Years of DC Comics The Art of Modern Mythmaking by Paul Levitz.
