= Independent News =

Magazine and comic book distribution company

Independent News Co.
- Type: Distributor
- Industry: Comics, magazines
- Founded: 1932; 94 years ago
- Founder: Harry Donenfeld; Paul Sampliner
- Defunct: 1970; 56 years ago
- Headquarters: New York City, U.S.
- Key people: Irving Donenfeld, Jack Liebowitz, Irwin Donenfeld
- Parent: National Periodical Publications

Independent News Co. was a magazine and comic book distribution business owned by National Periodical Publications, the parent company of DC Comics. Independent News distributed all DC publications, as well as those of a few rival publishers, such as Marvel Comics from 1957 to 1969, in addition to pulp and popular magazines. The company was founded in 1932 and operated until 1970.

== History ==
=== Origins ===
In 1929, as a favor to an old client, pulp magazine publisher Harry Donenfeld gave work to the client's son, Jack Liebowitz. Donenfeld and Liebowitz had little in common, but Liebowitz soon emerged as a man who could run finances. Whereas Donenfeld would promise the world to clients without understanding the economic realities, Liebowitz was bookish and ensured bills were paid on time and helped create respectability in the firm. Soon the two men were spoken of as a partnership.

When Liebowitz first worked for Donenfeld, the latter's empire was little more than a publishing house for "sex pulp" and art nudie magazines distributed by Eastern News, a company run by Charles Dreyfus and Paul Sampliner. In 1931, Eastern News faced bankruptcy and could no longer pay its publishers; the company owed Donenfeld alone $30,000. A compromise was called for, and Donenfeld, not wanting to find himself hamstrung by a distributor again, approached Sampliner with the idea of creating the Independent News Company, a publishing house with its own distribution system.

With Sampliner running the distribution end, Donenfeld as salesman, Harry's youngest brother Irving (not to be mistaken for Harry's son: Irwin Donenfeld) as head printer, and Liebowitz running the finances, they launched Independent News in 1932. The Donenfeld brothers had begun as printers, and they continued printing the company's magazine and comic book covers even after branching into distribution.

Now Donenfeld was a distributor as well as a publisher, and was now no longer reliant on others to run his business. As a publisher, Donenfeld had managed to dodge creditors and break deals, but as a distributor, he came to rely more on Liebowitz to ensure that the company ran smoothly. Liebowitz ensured bills were paid on time and began to build trust with clients that Donenfeld's enterprises had never experienced.

=== Expansion ===
In 1935, writer/entrepreneur Malcolm Wheeler-Nicholson approached Independent News in a bid to launch his comic book New Fun, having lost his previous backers due to poor sales and debts. Donenfeld accepted to distribute the comic but with a heavy loss of rights for Wheeler-Nicholson. Wheeler-Nicholson produced two more titles to be handled by Independent News, New Comics and Detective Comics (which would later see the first appearance of Batman), now under the banner of Detective Comics Inc., in which Wheeler-Nicholson was forced to take Donenfeld and Liebowitz as partners. In 1938, Donenfeld sued Wheeler-Nicholson for nonpayment and Detective Comics Inc. went into bankruptcy. Not too surprisingly, Donenfeld bought up the company and Wheeler-Nicholson's National Allied Publications in their entirety as part of the action.

The fourth publication under National Allied Publications would be Action Comics (1938). Issue #1 introduced the superhero, Superman, created by artist Joe Shuster and writer Jerry Siegel, and the character's popularity created incredible profits; not only in comic book sales, but also in merchandising such as toys, costumes and even a radio show. At the end of 1941 Donenfeld's comic businesses took in $2.6 million.

Max Gaines, future founder of EC Comics, formed All-American Publications in 1938 after successfully seeking funding from Harry Donenfeld., As Gerard Jones writes of Donenfeld's investment:

Harry had agreed on one condition: that [Gaines] take [Detective Comics partner] Jack Liebowitz on as his partner. ... Jack would be tempted to leave and form a competing company if there was nothing to hold him. And it may well have been a way for Harry to keep Gaines under control; since Jack was still drawing a salary and significant bonuses from Detective Comics and [self-distributorship] Independent News, he wouldn't let Gaines take off on his own or act against the interests of the other companies. ... Gaines became the principal and Jack Liebowitz the minority owner of All-American [Publications].

In 1946, Gaines let Liebowitz buy him out, keeping only Picture Stories from the Bible as the foundation of his own new company, EC Comics. "Liebowitz promptly orchestrated the merger of All-American and Detective Comics into National Comics.... Next he took charge of organizing National Comics, Independent News, and their affiliated firms into a single corporate entity, National Periodical Publications". Donnenfeld was also a minority owner in the pulp magazine distributor Leader News Company, which lasted from 1939 until 1956. During that time, the company distributed magazines by Trojan, as well as EC Comics.

=== Consolidation ===
The biggest magazine distribution company of this era was American News Company, which had a virtual monopoly on all comics except DC's. From 1952 to 1957 Atlas Comics publisher Martin Goodman distributed his company's comics to newsstands through his self-owned distributor, Atlas. He then switched to American News — which shortly afterward lost a Justice Department lawsuit and discontinued its business. Atlas was left without distribution and was forced to turn to its biggest rival, National (DC) Comics which imposed draconian restrictions on Goodman's company. As then-Atlas editor Stan Lee recalled in a 1988 interview:

... [We had been] turning out 40, 50, 60 books a month, maybe more, and ... suddenly we went ... to either eight or 12 books a month, which was all Independent News Distributors would accept from us.

American Comics Group, another comic book publisher from the era (also with ties to Harry Donenfeld), was distributed by Independent News, as were such popular magazines as Playboy and Family Circle.

Jack Liebowitz stayed with Independent News until 1965, eventually becoming a co-owner. Irwin Donenfeld, who was DC's editorial director in the 1960s, was also a vice president of Independent News.

In 1966, Independent News expanded its operations to the United Kingdom by acquiring the bankrupt British publisher/distributor Thorpe & Porter. With this purchase, Independent News became the sole distributor of American comics in the U.K., handling not only DC's output but also those of a few rival publishers, such as Marvel (until 1969), in addition to pulp and popular magazines.

=== Sale and demise ===
In 1967, National Periodical Publications (including Independent News) was purchased by Kinney National Company, which later purchased Warner Bros.-Seven Arts and became Warner Communications. The Donenfelds and their "crew" were out, and new management came in.

By 1970, Independent News was defunct, absorbed into a larger and changing distribution business. (Ironically, right before the distributor closed, it had been pegged to distribute National Lampoon, which was to become a publishing phenomenon of the early 1970s.) Independent News' last president was Harold Chamberlin, who served from 1968 to 1970. Chamblerin went on to become president of Warner Publishing from 1970 to 1979.

As "Warner Publishing Services," the company was named by DC Comics as one of the honorees in the company's 50th-anniversary publication Fifty Who Made DC Great.

== See also ==
- Direct market
