= Jack Liebowitz =

Ukrainian born American accountant and publisher

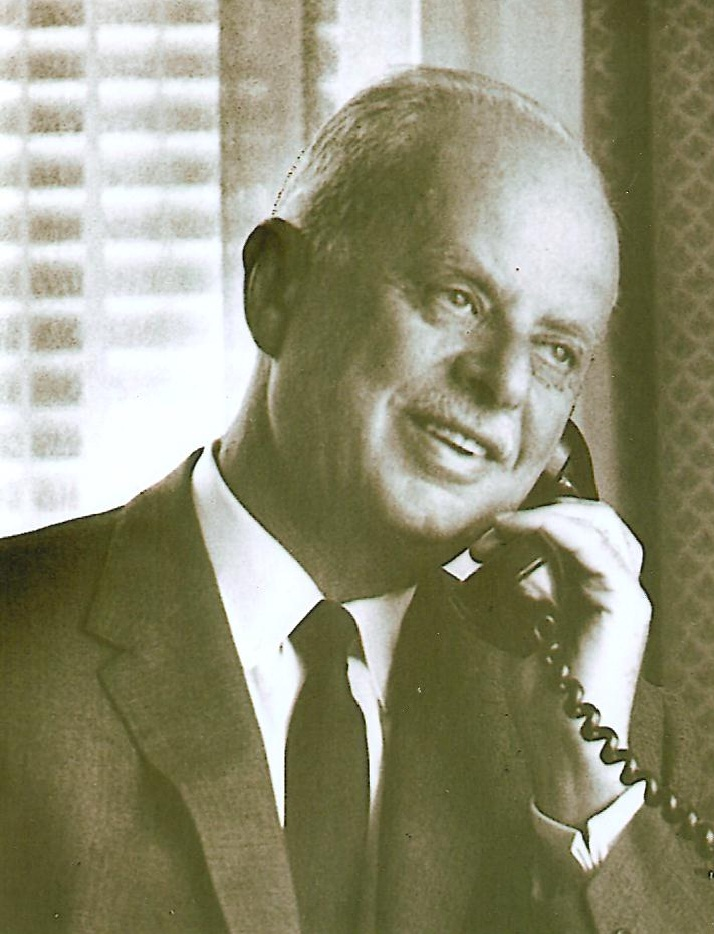
- Jack Liebowitz working at the offices of DC Comics
- Born: Yacov Lebovitz; October 10, 1900; Proskuriv, Ukraine
- Died: December 11, 2000 (aged 100); Great Neck, New York, U.S.
- Other name: Jacob S. Liebowitz
- Occupations: Accountant, publisher

Jacob S. Liebowitz (/ˈliːbəwɪts/; born Yacov Lebovitz, October 10, 1900 – December 11, 2000) was an American accountant and publisher. He is known primarily for being the co-owner with Harry Donenfeld of National Periodical Publications (later DC Comics).

== Early life ==
Jack Liebowitz was born Yacov Lebovitz in Proskuriv, present-day Khmelnytsky, Ukraine in October 1900, to a Jewish family. His mother, Mindl, never identified his biological father, her first husband (who had left the family), but married Yulyus Lebovitz when her son was three. Yacov soon adopted his stepfather's surname, and in 1910 the family emigrated to the United States. They arrived in the Jewish neighborhood of New York City's Lower East Side and, as was common at the time, adopted Anglicized names: His parents became Julius and Minnie Liebowitz, while he became Jacob, soon shortened to Jack. Jack was a hardworking child and became a newsboy amongst other small jobs. In high school, he became adept at accountancy, a career he thought would help him escape his poor background.

=== Career and partnership with Harry Donenfeld ===
By age 24, Liebowitz had earned his accounting degree from New York University, and by 1927 had married (Rose) and moved to The Bronx. Liebowitz set himself up as an accountant based in Manhattan's Union Square area, with one client, the International Ladies' Garment Workers' Union (ILGWU); his father had been a steward for that union since the early 1910s. By 1925, Liebowitz was in charge of the union's strike fund, and a year later managed to keep the fund solvent in the wake of a six-month, 50,000-worker strike. His business acumen placed Liebowitz in a position of high standing with the union officials. Toward the end of the decade, Liebowitz had taken on more clients and begun studying the stock market. His initial dealings worked well for the union, but after the Wall Street crash of 1929, funds plummeted and Liebowitz and the ILGWU parted company.

In 1929, Julius Liebowitz approached Harry Donenfeld, whom he had befriended through ILGWU ties, and sought work for his son. Donenfeld, a rising businessperson who felt a sense of loyalty to those from the old neighborhood, took Jack on as his personal accountant. Although a chance meeting, the two men complemented each other very well—Donenfeld was a social, chance-taking high-flyer, while Liebowitz was cautious and had a logical mind that ensured Donenfeld's fiscal mistakes were small, and that his business promises were binding only in favor to himself.

When Liebowitz first worked for Donenfeld, the latter's empire was little more than a publishing house for "sex pulp" and art nudie magazines distributed by Eastern News, a company run by Charles Dreyfus and Paul Sampliner. In 1931, Eastern News faced bankruptcy and could no longer pay its publishers; the company owed Donenfeld alone $30,000. A compromise was called for, and Donenfeld, not wanting to find himself hamstrung by a distributor again, approached Sampliner with the idea of creating the Independent News Company, a publishing house with its own distribution system. As a publisher, Donenfeld had managed to dodge creditors and break deals, but as a distributor, he came to rely more on Liebowitz to ensure that the company ran smoothly. Liebowitz ensured bills were paid on time and began to build a trust with clients that Donenfeld's enterprises had never experienced.

== National/DC ==
In 1935, Major Malcolm Wheeler-Nicholson came to Independent News seeking a new distributor for the comic book projects his company, National Allied Publications, was producing. Although comic books were not Donenfeld's main field, he took on Wheeler-Nicholson, and Independent News began printing and distributing comic books. Wheeler-Nicholson brought out two comics, New Fun and New Comics—the former of historical note as the first modern comic book with all-original material, as opposed to newspaper-comic reprints with occasional, tangential new material—but it would be his third publication, Detective Comics, that would prove key. Already in considerable debt with Independent, Wheeler-Nicholson could only fund publication of Detective Comics by creating a subsidiary company—Detective Comics Incorporated—in partnership with Liebowitz.

In 1938, Donenfeld managed to remove Wheeler-Nicholson from the equation, pushing Detective Comics, Inc. into bankruptcy and buying its assets. As part of the bankruptcy action, Liebowitz—now sole owner of Detective Comics Inc.—bought up Wheeler-Nicholson's National Allied Publications, and Donenfeld and Liebowitz assumed control over the entire, growing comic-book publisher.

Liebowitz, now in control of the fledgling company, devised the title for what was to become National/DC's most important comic book: Action Comics. He asked editor Vin Sullivan to find material to fill the new title, and Sullivan, Liebowitz and Sheldon Mayer ultimately created comics history and kickstarted what historians and fans call the Golden Age of Comic Books by selecting writer Jerry Siegel and artist Joe Shuster's character Superman to star in the new title.

=== All-American Publications ===
In the late 1930s, Max Gaines, who had past experience as a comic book publisher, approached Donenfeld for finances and distribution to set up his own publishing company. Donenfeld agreed, on the condition that Gaines take Liebowitz on as partner. Donenfeld arranged this not only to reward Liebowitz for his work with Independent News, but also as a hook to keep Liebowitz with the company and to ensure Gaines would not act outside the interests of Donenfeld's business. By the end of 1938, Gaines and Liebowitz were principal and minority owner, respectively, of All-American Publications, an independent sister-company to National/DC.

In 1945/46, Gaines left All-American to found his own company—initially called Educational Comics, later known as EC—allowing Liebowitz to buy his interest in the company. Liebowitz promptly merged All-American with DC/National, and he and Donenfeld continued publishing the best of both companies' titles.

=== New media ===
As the years rolled by, Liebowitz stayed at the forefront of new technologies and entertainment media, helping oversee Superman's transition to movie serials starring Kirk Alyn; to radio; and to theatrical animated shorts. Comics historian Gerard Jones described Liebowitz as the only comics publisher who "made any real effort to make the new medium [Television] work for him" when in 1951 producer Whitney Ellsworth brought the syndicated series Adventures of Superman to television.

=== Company changes ===
DC Comics went public in 1961, and became officially known as National Periodical Publications with Liebowitz remaining president of what was by then America's foremost comics publisher. Six years later, Kinney National Services acquired the company; the following year, Kinney also bought Warner Bros. to form Warner Communications.

Liebowitz continued to be an active member of the Warner Communications board, visiting his office daily even into his 91st year, finally relinquishing his place in 1991.

== 1950s acquisitions ==
In the 1950s the comics industry suffered a massive shrink in sales, credited by many to the newly introduced Comics Code Authority, which banned publications that printed scenes of what was described as of a horrific, violent or sexual nature. This not only affected the popular horror and crime comics, but even the teen romance market. Liebowitz, who had pushed for a moral code in his own publications earlier in his career, was made vice-president of the organization under John Goldwater, and unsurprisingly was least affected by the new code, as his own comics were in line with the code before it was introduced.

In 1956 the comics market had shrunk by fifty percent compared to its early 1950 levels. When the American News Company was found guilty of restraint of trade in 1957 it was forced to divest itself of its newsstands. This caused George Delacorte of Dell Comics to a find a new distributor, and this in turn spelled the end of American News. Of those companies that had survived the early 1950s only half remained after the loss of such a large distributor. Liebowitz made three notable distribution acquisitions during this turmoil. The first was Martin Goodman's publishing company (whose staff would later form Marvel Comics), Bill Gaines's Mad magazine and Hugh Hefner's Playboy.

== Non-publishing work and life ==
A founding trustee of the Long Island Jewish Hospital (renamed North Shore-Long Island Jewish Health System), Liebowitz served on the board for over 50 years, beginning 1949, acting as honorary chairman, and was also the medical center's second president, from 1956 to 1968. In addition, he was a trustee of the Federation of Jewish Philanthropies in New York.

In 1985, DC Comics named Liebowitz as one of the honorees in the company's 50th anniversary publication Fifty Who Made DC Great.

Liebowitz died December 11, 2000, and is buried in Mount Ararat Cemetery in East Farmingdale, Suffolk County, New York.

Liebowitz's niece Carole was married for many years to Harry Donenfeld's son, Irwin, a long-time DC executive (and co-owner).
