= Malcolm Wheeler-Nicholson =

American writer, creator of DC Comics

Major Malcolm Wheeler-Nicholson
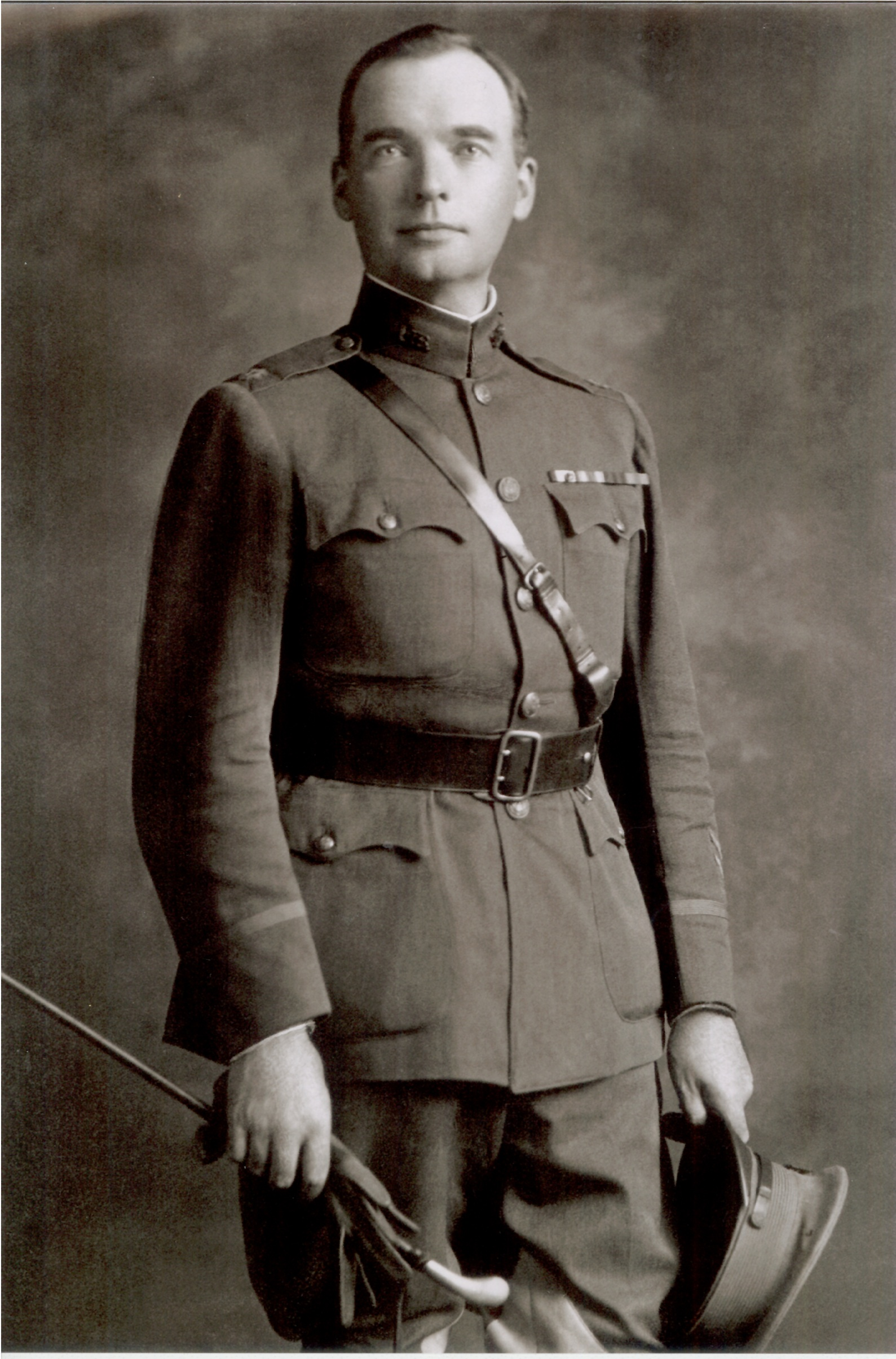
- Born: Malcolm Strain; January 7, 1890 Greeneville, Tennessee, U.S.
- Died: September 21, 1965 (aged 75) New York City, U.S.
- Area: Publisher
- Notable works: National Allied Publications (now DC Comics)
- Spouse: Elsa Sachsenhausen Björkbom
- Children: 5
- Relatives: Dana Wheeler-Nicholson (granddaughter)

Malcolm Wheeler-Nicholson (né Strain; January 7, 1890 – September 21, 1965) was an American pulp magazine writer, entrepreneur and military officer who pioneered the American comic book, publishing the first such periodical consisting solely of original material rather than reprints of newspaper comic strips. Historian and author David Hajdu credits Wheeler-Nicholson as "the link between the pulps and what we know of as comics today." He launched the magazine comics company National Allied Publications in 1935, which would evolve to become DC Comics, one of the United States' two largest comic book publishers along with rival Marvel Comics.

== Biography ==
=== Early life and military career ===
Malcolm was born on January 7, 1890, (Note: The date of birth of January 7 is supported by Wheeler-Nicholson's draft records. Wheeler-Nicholson's son Douglas recalled the birthdate as January 4, 1890.) in Greeneville, Tennessee. His father, Lew O. Strain, died after the birth of his second son, Malcolm's brother Christopher. Another sibling, a sister named Caroline, died in 1894, when Malcolm was four. Their mother, Antoinette Wheeler-Strain (née Wheeler), afterward moved to New York City, became a journalist, and later joined a start-up women's magazine in Portland, Oregon. By this time she had changed her last name to "Strahan", a variant of "Strain", and upon marrying teacher Thomas J. B. Nicholson, who would become the boys' stepfather, reverted to her maiden name and appended her new married name. The brothers were raised in "an iconoclastic, intellectual household" where their family entertained such guests as Theodore Roosevelt and Rudyard Kipling.

Wheeler-Nicholson spent his boyhood both in Portland and on a horse ranch in Washington state. Raised riding horses, he went on to attend the military academy The Manlius School in DeWitt, New York, and in 1917 joined the U.S. Cavalry as a second lieutenant. According to differing sources, he rose to become either "the youngest major in the Army", the youngest in the Cavalry, or, as per the family, one of the youngest in the Cavalry, at age 27, By his own account, he "chased bandits on the Mexican border, fought fevers and played polo in the Philippines, led a battalion of infantry against the Bolsheviki in Siberia, helped straighten out the affairs of the army in France [and] commanded the headquarters cavalry of the American force in the Rhine". His outposts included Japan; London, England; and Germany. After World War I, Wheeler-Nicholson was sent to study at Saint-Cyr in Paris, France.

The major's public criticism of Army command in an open letter to President Warren G. Harding, and his accusations against senior officers, led to countercharges, hearings, and a lawsuit against West Point Superintendent General Fred W. Sladen. Wheeler-Nicholson also was a victim of a shooting that his family called an Army-sanctioned assassination attempt and the Army called the mistake of a guard who mistook Wheeler-Nicholson for an intruder at another officer's home. It left him hospitalized with a bullet wound. Following this, Wheeler-Nicholson in June 1922 was convicted in a court-martial trial of violating the 96th Article of War in publishing the open letter. Although he was not demoted, his career was dead-ended. He resigned his commission in 1923. His $100,000 lawsuit against Sladen was dismissed by the New York State Supreme Court the following year.

=== Writing career ===
Wheeler-Nicholson wrote nonfiction about military topics, including the 1922 book Modern Cavalry. He also wrote fiction, including the Western hardcover novel Death at the Corral. By 1922, Wheeler-Nicholson had begun writing short stories for the pulps. The major soon became a cover name, penning military and historical adventure fiction for such magazines as Adventure and Argosy. He additionally ghost wrote six adventure novels about air hero Bill Barnes for Street & Smith Publications.

Concurrently, in 1925, he founded Wheeler-Nicholson, Inc. to syndicate his work, which included a daily comic-strip adaptation of Robert Louis Stevenson's novel Treasure Island, with art by N. Brewster Morse.

=== New Fun ===
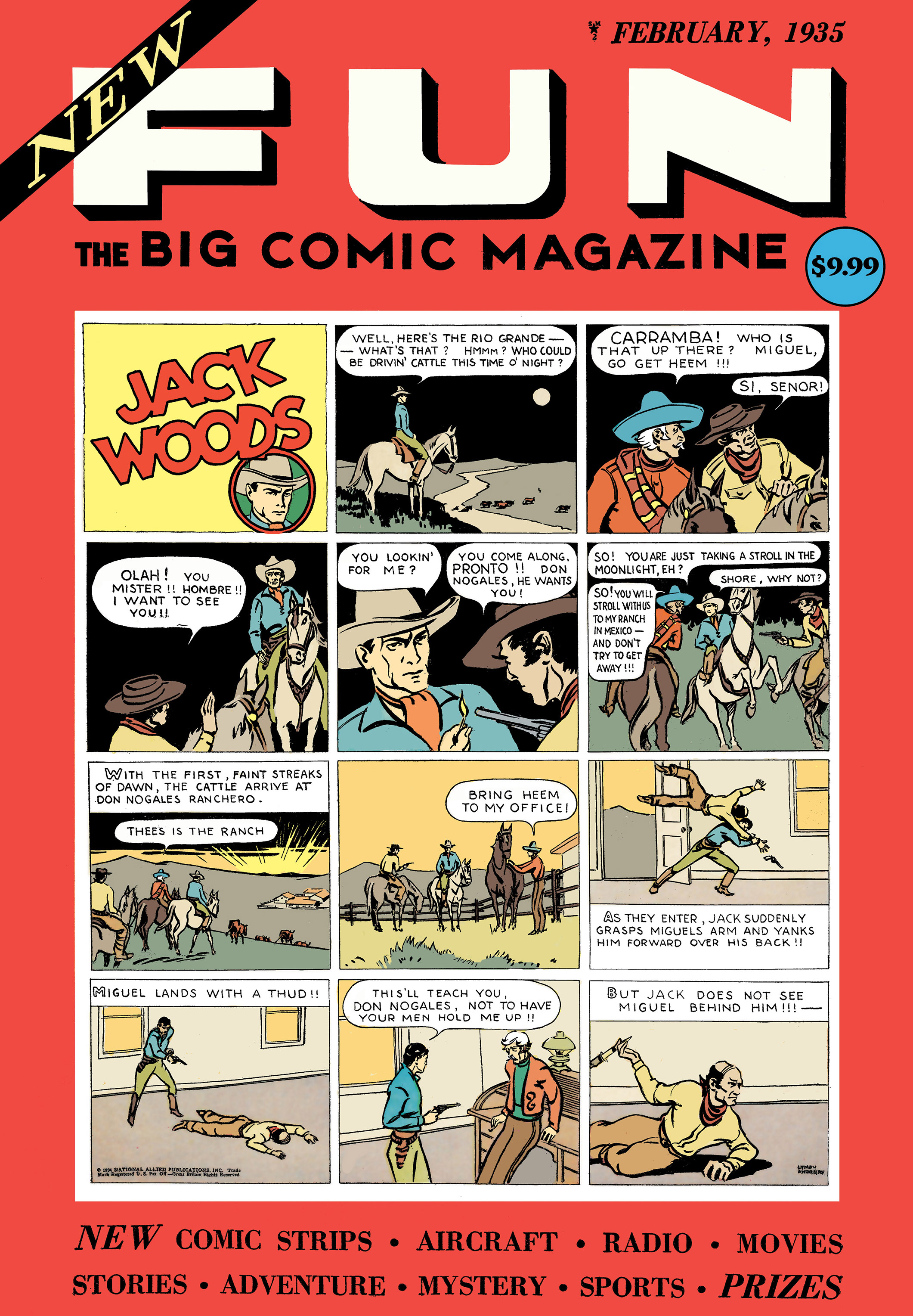
New Fun: The Big Comic Magazine #1 (Feb. 1935). Cover art by Lyman Anderson

In 1935, having seen the emergence of Famous Funnies (1933) and other oversize magazines reprinting comic strips, Wheeler-Nicholson formed, from an idea in 1934, the comics publishing company National Allied Publications. While contemporary comics "consisted ... of reprints of old syndicate material", Wheeler-Nicholson found that the "rights to all the popular strips ... had been sewn up". While some existing publications had included small amounts of original material, generally as filler, and while Dell Publishing had put out a proto-comic book of all original strips, The Funnies, in 1929, Wheeler-Nicholson's premiere comic – New Fun #1 (Feb. 1935) – became the first comic book containing all-original material. As author Nicky Wright wrote,

It was at this point Wheeler-Nicholson made history. He produced a comic appropriately titled New Fun: The Big Comic Magazine, so-called because it was larger than the other comics, measuring 10 by 15 inches. ... Not only was the size different, so were the strips. They were all original, featuring all new characters specially drawn for New Fun ... Besides original strips, New Fun was the first comic to carry advertising.

A tabloid-sized, 10-inch by 15-inch, 36-page magazine with a cardstock, non-glossy cover, New Fun #1 was an anthology of "humor and adventure strips, many of which [Wheeler-Nicholson] wrote himself". The features included the talking animal comic "Pelion and Ossa" and the college-set "Jigger and Ginger", mixed with such dramatic fare as the Western strip "Jack Woods" and the "yellow peril" adventure "Barry O'Neill", featuring a Fu Manchu-styled villain, Fang Gow. While all-original material was a risky venture, the book sold well enough that National Allied Publishing continued to fill books "with new strips every month". Golden Age comics creator Sheldon Mayer quipped years later of Wheeler-Nicholson: "Not only the first man to publish comic books but also the first to stiff an artist for his check".

The first four issues were edited by future Funnies, Inc. founder Lloyd Jacquet, the fifth by Wheeler-Nicholson himself. Issue #6 (Oct. 1935) brought the comic-book debuts of Jerry Siegel and Joe Shuster, the future creators of Superman, who began their careers with the musketeer swashbuckler "Henri Duval" (doing the first two installments before turning it over to others) and, under the pseudonyms "Leger and Reuths", the supernatural-crimefighter adventure Doctor Occult. They would remain on the latter title through issue #32 (June 1938), following the magazine's retitling as More Fun (issues #7–8, Jan.–Feb. 1936), and More Fun Comics (#9–on).

Wheeler-Nicholson added a second magazine, New Comics, which premiered with a Dec. 1935 cover date and at close to what would become the standard size of Golden Age comic books, with slightly larger dimensions than today's. The title became New Adventure Comics with issue #12, and finally Adventure Comics with #32. Continuing for many decades, until issue #503 in 1983, it would become one of the longest-running comic books. In 2009, it was briefly revived with its original numbering, ultimately ending again in 2011 with issue #529, prior to DC Comics' New 52 reboot.

Despite Wheeler-Nicholson's optimism, finding a place in the market was difficult. Newsstands were reluctant to stock a magazine of untested new material from an unknown publisher, particularly as other companies' comics titles were perceived as being "successful because they featured characters everyone knew and loved". Returns were high, and cash-flow difficulties made the interval between issues unpredictable. Artist Creig Flessel recalled that at the company's office on Fourth Avenue, "The major flashed in and out of the place, doing battles with the printers, the banks, and other enemies of the struggling comics".

=== Later career ===
Detective Comics #1 (March 1937). Cover art by Vin Sullivan.

Wheeler-Nicholson suffered from continual financial crises, both in his personal and professional lives. "Dick Woods" artist Lyman Anderson, whose Manhattan apartment Wheeler-Nicholson used as a rent-free pied-à-terre, said, "His wife would call [from home on Long Island] and be in tears ... and say she didn't have money and the milkman was going to cut off the milk for the kids. I'd send out 10 bucks, just because she needed it".

The third and final title published under his aegis would be Detective Comics, advertised with a cover illustration dated Dec. 1936, but eventually premiering three months late, with a March 1937 cover date.

Detective Comics would become a sensation with the introduction of Batman in issue #27 (May 1939). By then, however, Wheeler-Nicholson was gone. In 1937, in debt to printing-plant owner and magazine distributor Harry Donenfeld – who was as well a pulp-magazine publisher and a principal in the magazine distributorship Independent News – Wheeler-Nicholson was compelled to take Donenfeld on as a partner in order to publish Detective Comics #1. Detective Comics, Inc. was formed, with Wheeler-Nicholson and Jack Liebowitz, Donenfeld's accountant, listed as owners.

The major remained for a year, but cash-flow problems continued. DC's 50th-anniversary publication Fifty Who Made DC Great cites the Great Depression as "forc[ing] Wheeler-Nicholson to sell his publishing business to Harry Donenfeld and Jack Liebowitz in 1937". However, wrote comics historian Gerard Jones:

In early 1938, Harry Donenfeld sent him and his wife on a cruise to Cuba to 'work up new ideas'. When they came home, the major found the lock to his office door changed. In his absence, Harry had sued him for nonpayment and pushed Detective Comics, Inc. into bankruptcy court. There a judge named Abe Mennen, one of Harry's old Tammany buddies, had been appointed interim president of the firm and arranged a quick sale of its assets to Independent News. Harry gave the major a percentage of More Fun Comics as a shut-up token and wished him well.

Wheeler-Nicholson "gave up on the world of commerce thereafter and went back to writing war stories and critiques of the American military" in addition to straight "articles on politics and military history".

== Personal life ==
While studying at the École Supérieure de Guerre in Paris, France, after World War I, Wheeler-Nicholson met Elsa Sachsenhausen Björkbom. They were married in Koblenz, Germany in 1920. Their first child, Antoinette, was born in Stockholm, Sweden, his wife's home, in February 1921. Antoinette married on April 11, 1945, when Wheeler-Nicholson and his wife lived in Great Neck, New York, on Long Island.

In 1923, their second child, daughter Marianne, was born. Son Malcolm was born in November 1926, in Rye, New York, son Douglas in 1928, and daughter Diane in 1932. Douglas married on September 2, 1955, by which time Wheeler-Nicholson and his wife were living in Bayside, Queens, New York City. The major died on September 21, 1965, in New York City and was buried at Nassau Knolls Cemetery in Port Washington, New York.

Actress Dana Wheeler-Nicholson (b. 1960) is the daughter of Wheeler-Nicholson's son Douglas.

== Legacy ==
Wheeler-Nicholson was a 2008 Judges' Choice inductee into the Will Eisner Comic Book Hall of Fame.

== Works ==
- Modern Cavalry: Studies on Its Role in the Warfare of To-day with Notes on Training for War Service (Macmillan, 1922)
- Battle Shield of the Republic (Macmillan, 1940)
- America Can Win (Macmillan, 1941)
- Are We Winning the Hard Way? (Crowell Publishing, 1943)
- The Texas-Siberia Trail: Adventure stories of Malcolm Wheeler-Nicholson (Off-Trail Publications, 2014) edited by John Locke, introduction by Nicky Wheeler-Nicholson
- DC Comics Before Superman: Major Malcolm Wheeler-Nicholson's Pulp Comics (2018, ISBN 978-1613451649), Hermes Press, by Nicky Wheeler-Nicholson
