= Marvel Comics =

American comic book publisher

- Logo used since 2024
- Parent company: Magazine Management (1951–1973); Marvel Comics Group (1973–1986); Marvel Entertainment Group (1986–1998); Marvel Entertainment (1998–2023); Disney Publishing Worldwide (2023–present)
- Status: Active
- Founded: 1939; 87 years ago (as Timely Comics); 1951; 75 years ago (as Atlas Comics); 1961; 65 years ago (as Marvel Comics)
- Founder: Martin Goodman
- Country of origin: United States
- Headquarters location: 135 W. 50th Street, Manhattan, New York City
- Distribution: Penguin Random House Publisher Services (direct market starting October 2021); Diamond Comic Distributors (sub-distributor through Penguin Random House starting October 2021, direct market until October 2021); Hachette Book Group Client Services (trade paperbacks and graphic novels)
- Key people: Brad Winderbaum (Head of Marvel Television, Animation, Comics & Franchise); David Abdo (General Manager, Comics & Franchise); Stephen Wacker (EIC)
- Publication types: List of publications
- Fiction genres: Superhero; Science fiction; Fantasy; Action; Adventure
- Imprints: imprint list
- Official website: marvel.com

Marvel Comics is an American comic book publisher, a property of the Walt Disney Company since December 31, 2009, and a subsidiary of Disney Publishing Worldwide since March 2023. Marvel was founded in 1939 by Martin Goodman as Timely Comics, and by 1951 had generally become known as Atlas Comics. The Marvel era began in August 1961 with the launch of The Fantastic Four and other superhero titles created by Stan Lee, Jack Kirby, Steve Ditko, and numerous others. The Marvel brand, which had been used over the years and decades, was solidified as the company's primary brand. Comics editor Stephen Wacker is the current editor-in-chief, serving since July 2026.

Marvel counts among its characters such well-known superheroes as Spider-Man, Wolverine, the Hulk, Captain America, Iron Man, Thor, Daredevil, Black Panther, Doctor Strange, and Captain Marvel, as well as popular superhero teams such as the Avengers, X-Men, Fantastic Four, and Guardians of the Galaxy. Its stable of well-known supervillains includes Doctor Doom, Magneto, Green Goblin, Kingpin, Red Skull, Loki, Ultron, Thanos, Apocalypse, and Galactus. Most of Marvel's fictional characters operate in a single reality known as the Marvel Universe, with most locations mirroring real-life places; many major characters are based in New York City. Additionally, Marvel has published many comics based on licensed properties. This includes Star Wars comics, first from 1977 to 1987, when the franchise was independently owned, and again beginning in 2015 by which time Star Wars and Marvel were both owned by Disney.

== History ==
=== Timely Publications ===
Marvel Comics #1 (Oct. 1939), the first comic from Marvel precursor Timely Comics. Cover art by Frank R. Paul.

Pulp-magazine publisher Martin Goodman created the company later known as Marvel Comics under the name Timely Publications in 1939. Goodman, who had started with a Western pulp in 1933, was expanding into the emerging—and by then already highly popular—new medium of comic books. Launching his new line from his existing company's offices at 330 West 42nd Street, New York City, he officially held the titles of editor, managing editor, and business manager, with Abraham Goodman (Martin's brother) officially listed as publisher.

Timely's first publication, Marvel Comics #1 (cover dated Oct. 1939), included the first appearance of Carl Burgos' android superhero the Human Torch, and the first appearances of Bill Everett's anti-hero Namor the Sub-Mariner, among other features. The issue was a great success; it and a second printing the following month sold a combined nearly 900,000 copies. While its contents came from an outside packager, Funnies, Inc., Timely had its own staff in place by the following year. The company's first true editor, writer-artist Joe Simon, teamed with artist Jack Kirby to create one of the first patriotically themed superheroes, Captain America, in Captain America Comics #1 (March 1941). It, too, proved a hit, with sales of nearly one million. Goodman formed Timely Comics, Inc., beginning with comics cover-dated April 1941 or Spring 1941.

While no other Timely character would achieve the success of these three characters, some notable heroes—many of which continue to appear in modern-day retcon appearances and flashbacks—include the Whizzer, Miss America, the Destroyer, the original Vision, and the Angel. Timely also published one of humor cartoonist Basil Wolverton's best-known features, "Powerhouse Pepper", as well as a line of children's talking animal comics featuring characters like Super Rabbit and the duo Ziggy Pig and Silly Seal.

Goodman hired his wife's 16-year-old cousin, Stanley Lieber, as a general office assistant in 1939. When editor Simon left the company in late 1941, Goodman made Lieber—by then writing pseudonymously as "Stan Lee"—interim editor of the comics line, a position Lee kept for decades except for three years during his military service in World War II. Lee wrote extensively for Timely, contributing to a number of different titles.

Goodman's business strategy involved having his various magazines and comic books published by a number of corporations all operating out of the same office and with the same staff. One of these shell companies through which Timely Comics was published was named Marvel Comics by at least Marvel Mystery Comics #55 (May 1944). As well, some comics' covers, such as All Surprise Comics #12 (Winter 1946–47), were labeled "A Marvel Magazine" many years before Goodman would formally adopt the name in 1961. The company began identifying the group of its comic division as Marvel Comic Group, on some comics cover-dated November 1948, when the company set up an in-house editorial board to compete with the likes of DC and Fawcett, though the legal name was still Timely.

=== Magazine Management / Atlas Comics ===
The post-war American comic market saw superheroes falling out of fashion. Goodman's comic book line dropped them for the most part and expanded into a wider variety of genres than even Timely had published, featuring horror, Westerns, humor, talking animal, men's adventure-drama, giant monster, crime, and war comics, and later adding jungle books, romance titles, espionage, and even medieval adventure, Bible stories and sports.

Goodman began using the globe logo of the Atlas News Company, the newsstand-distribution company he owned, on comics cover-dated November 1951 even though another company, Kable News, continued to distribute his comics through the August 1952 issues. This globe branding united a line put out by the same publisher, staff and freelancers through 59 shell companies, from Animirth Comics to Zenith Publications.

Atlas, rather than innovate, took a proven route of following popular trends in television and films—Westerns and war dramas prevailing for a time, drive-in film monsters another time—and even other comic books, particularly the EC horror line. Atlas also published a plethora of children's and teen humor titles, including Dan DeCarlo's Homer the Happy Ghost (similar to Casper the Friendly Ghost) and Homer Hooper (à la Archie Andrews). Atlas unsuccessfully attempted to revive superheroes from late 1953 to mid-1954, with the Human Torch (art by Syd Shores and Dick Ayers, variously), the Sub-Mariner (drawn and most stories written by Bill Everett), and Captain America (writer Stan Lee, artist John Romita Sr.). Atlas did not achieve any breakout hits and, according to Stan Lee, survived chiefly because it produced work quickly, cheaply, and at a passable quality.

In 1957, Goodman switched distributors to the American News Company—which shortly afterward lost a Justice Department lawsuit and discontinued its business. Atlas was left without distribution and was forced to turn to Independent News, the distribution arm of its biggest rival, National (DC) Comics, which imposed draconian restrictions on Goodman's company. As then-Atlas editor Stan Lee recalled in a 1988 interview, "[We had been] turning out 40, 50, 60 books a month, maybe more, and ... suddenly we went ... to either eight or 12 books a month, which was all Independent News Distributors would accept from us." The company was briefly renamed to Goodman Comics in 1957 under the distribution deal with Independent News.

=== Marvel Comics ===
The Fantastic Four #1 (Nov. 1961). Cover art by Jack Kirby (penciler) and an unknown inker.

The first modern comic books under the Marvel Comics brand were the science-fiction anthology Journey into Mystery #69 and the teen-humor title Patsy Walker #95 (both cover dated June 1961), which each displayed an "MC" box on its cover. Then, in the wake of DC Comics' success in reviving superheroes in the late 1950s and early 1960s, particularly with the Flash, Green Lantern, Batman, Superman, Wonder Woman, Green Arrow, and other members of the team the Justice League of America, Marvel followed suit. (Note: Apocryphal legend has it that in 1961, either Jack Liebowitz or Irwin Donenfeld of DC Comics (then known as National Periodical Publications) bragged about DC's success with the Justice League (which had debuted in The Brave and the Bold #28 [February 1960] before going on to its own title) to publisher Martin Goodman (whose holdings included the nascent Marvel Comics) during a game of golf. However, film producer and comics historian Michael Uslan partly debunked the story in a letter published in Alter Ego #43 (December 2004), pp. 43–44 Irwin said he never played golf with Goodman, so the story is untrue. I heard this story more than a couple of times while sitting in the lunchroom at DC's 909 Third Avenue and 75 Rockefeller Plaza office as Sol Harrison and [production chief] Jack Adler were schmoozing with some of us … who worked for DC during our college summers.... [T]he way I heard the story from Sol was that Goodman was playing with one of the heads of Independent News, not DC Comics (though DC owned Independent News). … As the distributor of DC Comics, this man certainly knew all the sales figures and was in the best position to tell this tidbit to Goodman. … Of course, Goodman would want to be playing golf with this fellow and be in his good graces. … Sol worked closely with Independent News' top management over the decades and would have gotten this story straight from the horse's mouth. Goodman, a publishing trend-follower aware of the JLA's strong sales, confirmably directed his comics editor, Stan Lee, to create a comic-book series about a team of superheroes. According to Lee in Origins of Marvel Comics (Simon and Schuster/Fireside Books, 1974), p. 16: "Martin mentioned that he had noticed one of the titles published by National Comics seemed to be selling better than most. It was a book called The [sic] Justice League of America and it was composed of a team of superheroes. … ' If the Justice League is selling ', spoke he, 'why don't we put out a comic book that features a team of superheroes?'")

In 1961, writer-editor Stan Lee revolutionized superhero comics by introducing superheroes designed to appeal to older readers than the predominantly child audiences of the medium, thus ushering what Marvel later called the Marvel Age of Comics. Modern Marvel's first superhero team, the titular stars of The Fantastic Four #1 (Nov. 1961), broke convention with other comic book archetypes of the time by squabbling, holding grudges both deep and petty, and eschewing anonymity or secret identities in favor of celebrity status. Subsequently, Marvel comics developed a reputation for focusing on characterization and adult issues to a greater extent than most superhero comics before them, a quality which the new generation of older readers appreciated. This applied to The Amazing Spider-Man title in particular, which turned out to be Marvel's most successful book. Its young hero suffered from self-doubt and mundane problems like any other teenager, something with which many readers could identify.

Stan Lee and freelance artist and eventual co-plotter Jack Kirby's Fantastic Four originated in a Cold War culture that led their creators to revise the superhero conventions of previous eras to better reflect the psychological spirit of their age. Eschewing such comic book tropes as secret identities and even costumes at first, having a monster as one of the heroes, and having its characters bicker and complain in what was later called a "superheroes in the real world" approach, the series represented a change that proved successful.

Marvel often presented flawed superheroes, freaks, and misfits—unlike the perfect, handsome, athletic heroes found in previous traditional comic books. Some Marvel heroes looked like villains and monsters such as the Hulk and the Thing. This naturalistic approach even extended into topical politics. Comics historian Mike Benton also noted:

In the world of [rival DC Comics'] Superman comic books, communism did not exist. Superman rarely crossed national borders or involved himself in political disputes. From 1962 to 1965, there were more communists [in Marvel Comics] than on the subscription list of Pravda. Communist agents attack Ant-Man in his laboratory, red henchmen jump the Fantastic Four on the moon, and Viet Cong guerrillas take potshots at Iron Man.

All these elements struck a chord with the older readers, including college-aged adults. In 1965, Spider-Man and the Hulk were both featured in Esquire magazine's list of 28 college campus heroes, alongside John F. Kennedy and Bob Dylan. In 2009, writer Geoff Boucher reflected that,

Superman and DC Comics instantly seemed like boring old Pat Boone; Marvel felt like The Beatles and the British Invasion. It was Kirby's artwork with its tension and psychedelia that made it perfect for the times—or was it Lee's bravado and melodrama, which was somehow insecure and brash at the same time?

In addition to Spider-Man and the Fantastic Four, Marvel began publishing further superhero titles featuring such heroes and antiheroes as the Hulk, Thor, Ant-Man, Iron Man, the X-Men, Daredevil, the Inhumans, Black Panther, Doctor Strange, Captain Marvel and the Silver Surfer, and such memorable antagonists as Doctor Doom, Magneto, Galactus, Loki, the Green Goblin, and Doctor Octopus, all existing in a shared reality known as the Marvel Universe, with locations that mirror real-life cities such as New York, Los Angeles and Chicago.

Marvel even lampooned itself and other comics companies in a parody comic, Not Brand Echh (a play on Marvel's dubbing of other companies as "Brand Echh", à la the then-common phrase "Brand X").

Originally, the company's publications were branded by a minuscule "Mc" on the upper right-hand corner of the covers. However, artist/writer Steve Ditko put a larger masthead picture of the title character of The Amazing Spider-Man on the upper left-hand corner on issue #2 that included the series' issue number and price. Lee appreciated the value of this visual motif and adapted it for the company's entire publishing line. This branding pattern, being typically either a full-body picture of the characters' solo titles or a collection of the main characters' faces in ensemble titles, would become standard for Marvel for decades.

Cover of The Avengers #4 (Mar 1964), featuring the return of Captain America. Art by Jack Kirby.

=== Cadence Industries ownership ===
In 1968, while selling 50 million comic books a year, company founder Goodman revised the constraining distribution arrangement with Independent News he had reached under duress during the Atlas years, allowing him now to release as many titles as demand warranted. Late that year, he sold Marvel Comics and its parent company, Magazine Management, to the Perfect Film & Chemical Corporation (later known as Cadence Industries), though he remained as publisher. In 1969, Goodman finally ended his distribution deal with Independent by signing with Curtis Circulation Company.

In 1971, the United States Department of Health, Education, and Welfare approached Marvel Comics editor-in-chief Stan Lee to do a comic book story about drug abuse. Lee agreed and wrote a three-part Spider-Man story portraying drug use as dangerous and unglamorous. However, the industry's self-censorship board, the Comics Code Authority, refused to approve the story because of the presence of narcotics, deeming the context of the story irrelevant. Lee, with Goodman's approval, published the story regardless in The Amazing Spider-Man #96–98 (May–July 1971), without the Comics Code seal. The market reacted well to the storyline, and the CCA subsequently revised the Code the same year.

Goodman retired as publisher in 1972 and installed his son, Chip, as publisher. Shortly thereafter, Lee succeeded him as publisher and also became Marvel's president for a brief time. During his time as president, he appointed his associate editor, prolific writer Roy Thomas, as editor-in-chief. Thomas added "Stan Lee Presents" to the opening page of each comic book.

Howard the Duck #8 (Jan. 1977). Cover art by Gene Colan and Steve Leialoha.

A series of new editors-in-chief oversaw the company during another slow time for the industry. Once again, Marvel attempted to diversify, and with the updating of the Comics Code published titles themed to horror (The Tomb of Dracula), martial arts (Shang-Chi: Master of Kung Fu), sword-and-sorcery (Conan the Barbarian in 1970, Red Sonja), satire (Howard the Duck) and science fiction (2001: A Space Odyssey, "Killraven" in Amazing Adventures, Battlestar Galactica, Star Trek, and, late in the decade, the long-running Star Wars series). Some of these were published in larger-format black and white magazines, under its Curtis Magazines imprint.

Marvel was able to capitalize on its successful superhero comics of the previous decade by acquiring a new newsstand distributor and greatly expanding its comics line. Marvel pulled ahead of rival DC Comics in 1972, during a time when the price and format of the standard newsstand comic were in flux. Goodman increased the price and size of Marvel's November 1971 cover-dated comics from 15 cents for 36 pages total to 25 cents for 52 pages. DC followed suit, but Marvel the following month dropped its comics to 20 cents for 36 pages, offering a lower-priced product with a higher distributor discount.

In 1973, Perfect Film & Chemical renamed itself as Cadence Industries and renamed Magazine Management as Marvel Comics Group. Goodman, now disconnected from Marvel, set up a new company called Seaboard Periodicals in 1974, reviving Marvel's old Atlas name for a new Atlas Comics line, but this lasted only a year and a half. In the mid-1970s a decline of the newsstand distribution network affected Marvel. Cult hits such as Howard the Duck fell victim to the distribution problems, with some titles reporting low sales when in fact the first specialty comic book stores resold them at a later date. But by the end of the decade, Marvel's fortunes were reviving, thanks to the rise of direct market distribution—selling through those same comics-specialty stores instead of newsstands.

Marvel ventured into audio in 1975 with a radio series and a record, both had Stan Lee as narrator. The radio series was Fantastic Four. The record was Spider-Man: Rock Reflections of a Superhero concept album for music fans.

Marvel Super Heroes Secret Wars #1 (May 1984). Cover art by Mike Zeck depicting Captain America, Wolverine, Cyclops, Hawkeye, Rogue, She-Hulk, The Thing, Colossus, Monica Rambeau, Nightcrawler, Spider-Man, Human Torch, Hulk, Iron Man and Storm.

Marvel held its own comic book convention, Marvelcon '75, in spring 1975, and promised a Marvelcon '76. At the 1975 event, Stan Lee used a Fantastic Four panel discussion to announce that Jack Kirby, the artist co-creator of most of Marvel's signature characters, was returning to Marvel after having left in 1970 to work for rival DC Comics. In October 1976, Marvel, which already licensed reprints in different countries, including the UK, created a superhero specifically for the British market. Captain Britain debuted exclusively in the UK, and later appeared in American comics. During this time, Marvel and the Iowa-based Register and Tribune Syndicate launched a number of syndicated comic strips—The Amazing Spider-Man, Howard the Duck, Conan the Barbarian, and The Incredible Hulk. None of the strips lasted past 1982, except for The Amazing Spider-Man, which was published until 2019.

In 1978, Jim Shooter became Marvel's editor-in-chief. Although a controversial personality, Shooter cured many of the procedural ills at Marvel, including repeatedly missed deadlines. During Shooter's nine-year tenure as editor-in-chief, Chris Claremont and John Byrne's run on the Uncanny X-Men and Frank Miller's run on Daredevil became critical and commercial successes. Shooter brought Marvel into the rapidly evolving direct market, institutionalized creator royalties, starting with the Epic Comics imprint for creator-owned material in 1982; introduced company-wide crossover story arcs with Contest of Champions and Secret Wars; and in 1986 launched the ultimately unsuccessful New Universe line to commemorate the 25th anniversary of the Marvel Comics imprint. Star Comics, a children-oriented line differing from the regular Marvel titles, was briefly successful during this period, although hampered by legal action by the owners of the recently defunct Harvey Comics for purposefully plagiarizing their house style.

=== Marvel Entertainment Group ownership ===
In 1986, Marvel's parent, Marvel Entertainment Group, was sold to New World Entertainment, which within three years sold it to MacAndrews and Forbes, owned by Revlon executive Ronald Perelman in 1989. In 1991 Perelman took MEG public. Following the rapid rise of this stock, Perelman issued a series of junk bonds that he used to acquire other entertainment companies, secured by MEG stock.

Marvel's logo from 1990 to 2002

Marvel earned a great deal of money with their 1980s children's comics imprint Star Comics and they earned a great deal more money and worldwide success during the comic book boom of the early 1990s, launching the successful 2099 line of comics set in the future (Spider-Man 2099, etc.) and the creatively daring though commercially unsuccessful Razorline imprint of superhero comics created by novelist and filmmaker Clive Barker. In 1990, Marvel began selling Marvel Universe Cards with trading card maker SkyBox International. These were collectible trading cards that featured the characters and events of the Marvel Universe. The 1990s saw the rise of variant covers, cover enhancements, swimsuit issues, and company-wide crossovers that affected the overall continuity of the Marvel Universe.

Spider-Man #1, later renamed "Peter Parker: Spider-Man" (August 1990). Cover art by Todd McFarlane.

In early 1992, seven of Marvel's prized artists—Todd McFarlane (known for his work on Spider-Man), Jim Lee (X-Men), Rob Liefeld (X-Force), Marc Silvestri (Wolverine), Erik Larsen (The Amazing Spider-Man), Jim Valentino (Guardians of the Galaxy), and Whilce Portacio (Uncanny X-Men)—left to form Image Comics in a deal brokered by Malibu Comics' owner Scott Mitchell Rosenberg. Three years later, on November 3, 1994, Rosenberg sold Malibu to Marvel. In purchasing Malibu, Marvel now owned computer coloring technology that had been developed by Rosenberg, and also integrated the Ultraverse line of comics and the Genesis Universe into Marvel's multiverse. Earlier that year, the company secured a deal with Harvey Comics, whereas Marvel took on the publishing and distribution of Harvey's titles.

In late 1994, Marvel acquired the comic book distributor Heroes World Distribution to use as its own exclusive distributor. As the industry's other major publishers made exclusive distribution deals with other companies, the ripple effect resulted in the survival of only one other major distributor in North America, Diamond Comic Distributors Inc. Then, by the middle of the decade, the industry had slumped, and in December 1996 MEG filed for Chapter 11 bankruptcy protection. In early 1997, when Marvel's Heroes World endeavor failed, Diamond also forged an exclusive deal with Marvel—giving the company its own section of its comics catalog Previews.

Marvel in the early to mid-1990s expanded their entries in other media, including Saturday-morning cartoons and various comics collaborations to explore new genres. In 1992, they released the X-Men: The Animated Series which was aired on Fox Kids, they later released Spider-Man: The Animated Series on the network as well. In 1993, Marvel teamed up with Thomas Nelson to create Christian media genre comics, including a Christian superhero named The Illuminator, they made adaptations of Christian novels too, including In His Steps, The Screwtape Letters, and The Pilgrim's Progress. In 1996, Marvel had some of its titles participate in "Heroes Reborn", a crossover that allowed Marvel to relaunch some of its flagship characters such as the Avengers and the Fantastic Four, and outsource them to the studios of two of the former Marvel artists turned Image Comics founders, Jim Lee and Rob Liefeld. The relaunched titles, which saw the characters transported to a parallel universe with a history distinct from the mainstream Marvel Universe, were a solid success amidst a generally struggling industry.

=== Marvel Enterprises ===
In 1997, Toy Biz bought Marvel Entertainment Group to end the bankruptcy, forming a new corporation, Marvel Enterprises. With his business partner Avi Arad, publisher Bill Jemas, and editor-in-chief Bob Harras, Toy Biz co-owner Isaac Perlmutter helped stabilize the comics line.

In 1998, the company launched the imprint Marvel Knights, taking place "with reduced [Marvel] continuity," according to one history, with better production quality. The imprint was helmed by soon-to-become editor-in-chief Joe Quesada; it featured tough, gritty stories showcasing such characters as the Daredevil, the Inhumans, and Black Panther.

With the new millennium, Marvel Comics emerged from bankruptcy and again began diversifying its offerings. X-Force #116 X-Force #119 (October 2001) was the first Marvel Comics title since The Amazing Spider-Man #96–98 in 1971 to not have the Comics Code Authority (CCA) approval seal, due to the violence depicted in the issue. The CCA, which governed the content of American comic books, rejected the issue, requiring that changes be made. Instead, Marvel simply stopped submitting comics to the CCA. It then established its own Marvel Rating System for comics. Marvel also created new imprints, such as MAX (an explicit-content line) and Marvel Adventures (developed for child audiences). The company also created an alternate universe imprint, Ultimate Marvel, that allowed the company to reboot its major titles by revising and updating its characters to introduce to a new generation.

Some of the company's properties were adapted into successful film franchises, such as the Men in Black film series (which was based on a Malibu book), starting in 1997, the Blade film series, starting in 1998, the X-Men film series, starting in 2000, and the highest grossing series, Spider-Man, beginning in 2002.

Marvel's Conan the Barbarian title was canceled in 1993 after 275 issues, while the Savage Sword of Conan magazine had lasted 235 issues. Marvel published additional titles including miniseries until 2000 for a total of 650 issues. Conan was picked up by Dark Horse Comics three years later.

In a cross-promotion, the November 1, 2006, episode of the CBS soap opera Guiding Light, titled "She's a Marvel", featured the character Harley Davidson Cooper (played by Beth Ehlers) as a superheroine named the Guiding Light. The character's story continued in an eight-page backup feature, "A New Light", that appeared in several Marvel titles published November 1 and 8. Also that year, Marvel created a wiki on its Web site.

Marvel Comics logo introduced in 2008

In late 2007 the company launched Marvel Digital Comics Unlimited, a digital archive of over 2,500 back issues available for viewing, for a monthly or annual subscription fee. At the December 2007 the New York Anime Fest, the company announcement that Del Rey Manga would published two original English language Marvel manga books featuring the X-Men and Wolverine to hit the stands in spring 2009.

In 2009 Marvel Comics closed its Open Submissions Policy, in which the company had accepted unsolicited samples from aspiring comic book artists, saying the time-consuming review process had produced no suitably professional work. The same year, the company commemorated its 70th anniversary, dating to its inception as Timely Comics, by issuing the one-shot Marvel Mystery Comics 70th Anniversary Special #1 and a variety of other special issues.

=== Disney conglomerate unit (2009–present) ===
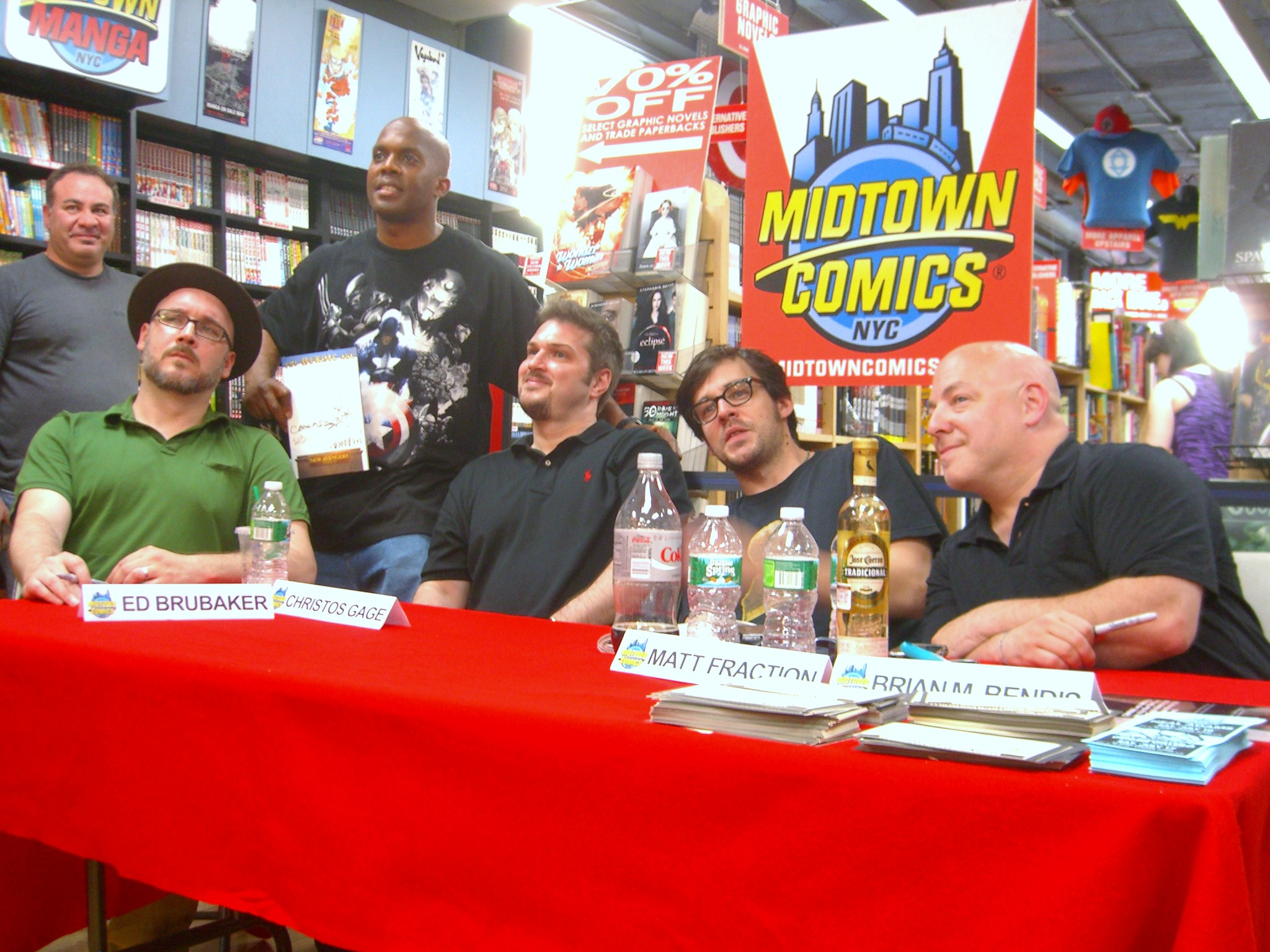
Writers of Marvel titles in the 2010s include (seated left to right) Ed Brubaker, Christos Gage, Matt Fraction, and Brian Michael Bendis.

On August 31, 2009, The Walt Disney Company announced it would acquire Marvel Comics' parent corporation, Marvel Entertainment, for a cash and stock deal worth approximately $4 billion, which if necessary would be adjusted at closing, giving Marvel shareholders $30 and 0.745 Disney shares for each share of Marvel they owned. As of 2008, Marvel and its major competitor DC Comics shared over 80% of the American comic-book market.

As of September 2010, Marvel switched its bookstore distribution company from Diamond Book Distributors to Hachette Distribution Services. Marvel moved its office to the Sports Illustrated Building in October 2010.

Marvel relaunched the CrossGen imprint, owned by Disney Publishing Worldwide, in March 2011. Marvel and Disney Publishing began jointly publishing Disney/Pixar Presents magazine that May.

Marvel discontinued its Marvel Adventures imprint in March 2012, and replaced them with a line of two titles connected to the Marvel Universe TV block. Also in March, Marvel announced its Marvel ReEvolution initiative that included Infinite Comics, a line of digital comics, Marvel AR, a software application that provides an augmented reality experience to readers and Marvel NOW!, a relaunch of most of the company's major titles with different creative teams. Marvel NOW! also saw the debut of new flagship titles including Uncanny Avengers and All-New X-Men.

In April 2013, Marvel and other Disney conglomerate components began announcing joint projects. With ABC, a Once Upon a Time graphic novel was announced for publication in September. With Disney, Marvel announced in October 2013 that in January 2014 it would release its first title under their joint "Disney Kingdoms" imprint "Seekers of the Weird", a five-issue miniseries. On January 3, 2014, fellow Disney subsidiary Lucasfilm announced that as of 2015, Star Wars comics would once again be published by Marvel.

Following the events of the company-wide crossover "Secret Wars" in 2015, a relaunched Marvel universe began in September 2015, called the All-New, All-Different Marvel.

Marvel Legacy was the company's Fall 2017 relaunch branding, which began that September. Books released as part of that initiative featured lenticular variant covers that required comic book stores to double their regular issue order to be able to order the variants. The owner of two Comix Experience stores complained about requiring retailers to purchase an excess of copies featuring the regular cover, which they would not be able to sell in order to acquire the more sought-after variant. Marvel responded to these complaints by rescinding these ordering requirements on newer series, but maintained it on more long-running titles like Invincible Iron Man. As a result, MyComicShop.com and at least 70 other comic book stores boycotted these variant covers. Despite the release of Guardians of the Galaxy Vol. 2, Logan, Thor: Ragnarok, and Spider-Man: Homecoming in theaters, none of those characters' titles featured in the top 10 sales and the Guardians of the Galaxy comic book series was canceled. Conan Properties International announced on January 12, 2018, that Conan would return to Marvel in early 2019.

On March 1, 2019, Serial Box, a digital book platform, announced a partnership with Marvel, in which they would publish new and original stories tied to a number of Marvel's popular franchises.

In the wake of the COVID-19 pandemic, from March to May 2020, Marvel and its distributor Diamond Comic Distributors stopped producing and releasing new comic books. On March 25, 2021, Marvel Comics announced that they planned to shift their direct market distribution for monthly comics and graphic novels from Diamond Comic Distributors to Penguin Random House. The change was scheduled to start on October 1, 2021, in a multi-year partnership. The arrangement would still allow stores the option to order comics from Diamond, but Diamond would be acting as a wholesaler rather than distributor.

On March 29, 2023, as a part of a corporate restructuring to fold Marvel Entertainment into The Walt Disney Company, Marvel Comics was transferred to Disney Publishing Worldwide. In June 2024, Marvel unveiled a new logo for Marvel Comics, similar in style to the logos for Marvel Studios and Marvel Studios Animation. This logo was meant to be used for more "corporate" purposes and on new social media channels for Marvel Comics, and would not appear on comics themselves. In May 2026, Marvel announced that Marvel Studios executive Brad Winderbaum had been promoted to the head of television, animation, comics, and franchise for Marvel. In his new role, Winderbaum would oversee the creative direction of the publishing unit as well as the global brands and franchises. David Abdo, the general manager of Disney Music Group, was hired as general manager of comics and franchises and would report to Winderbaum, as would Cebulski. At the same time, Buckley was announced to be exiting his role in mid-2027. In July 2026, Feige, Winderbaum, and Abdo announced that Marvel Comics would relocate its headquarters and over 100 employees from Manhattan, New York to the Walt Disney Studios Burbank lot alongside Marvel Studios by the following July, and that veteran comics editor Stephen Wacker would succeed Cebulski as editor-in-chief. Feige believed that this move signified a long-term investment in the publishing unit and would reinvigorate its storytelling, which had been "overshadowed" by the MCU films.

== Officers ==
- Michael Z. Hobson, executive vice president; Marvel Comics Group vice-president (1986)
- Stan Lee, chairman and publisher (1986)
- Joseph Calamari, executive vice president (1986)
- Jim Shooter, vice president and editor-in-chief (1986)

=== Publishers ===
- Abraham Goodman, 1939
- Martin Goodman, 1939–1972
- Charles "Chip" Goodman, 1972
- Stan Lee, 1972 – October 1996
- Shirrel Rhoades, October 1996 – October 1998
- Winston Fowlkes, February 1998 – November 1999
- Bill Jemas, February 2000 – 2003
- Dan Buckley, 2003 – January 2017 (Note: Following Buckley's promotion to head of Marvel Comics & Franchise in 2025, the title of publisher was quietly retired but Buckley was still referred to as the publisher in comic publications.)
- John Nee, January 2018 – November 2020

=== Editors-in-chief ===
Marvel's chief editor originally held the title of "editor". This head editor's title later became "editor-in-chief". Joe Simon was the company's first true chief-editor, with publisher Martin Goodman, who had served as titular editor only and outsourced editorial operations.

In 1994, Marvel briefly abolished the position of editor-in-chief, replacing Tom DeFalco with five group editors-in-chief. As Carl Potts described the 1990s editorial arrangement:

In the early '90s, Marvel had so many titles that there were three Executive Editors, each overseeing approximately one-third of the line. Bob Budiansky was the third Executive Editor [following the previously promoted Mark Gruenwald and Potts]. We all answered to Editor-in-Chief Tom DeFalco and Publisher Mike Hobson. All three Executive Editors decided not to add our names to the already crowded credits on the Marvel titles. Therefore it wasn't easy for readers to tell which titles were produced by which Executive Editor … In late '94, Marvel reorganized into a number of different publishing divisions, each with its own Editor-in-Chief.

Marvel reinstated the overall editor-in-chief position in 1995 with Bob Harras.

Editor

- Martin Goodman (1939–1940; titular only)
- Joe Simon (1939–1941)
- Stan Lee (1941–1942)
- Vincent Fago (acting editor during Lee's military service) (1942–1945)
- Stan Lee (1945–1972)
- Roy Thomas (1972–1974)
- Len Wein (1974–1975)
- Marv Wolfman (black-and-white magazines 1974–1975, entire line 1975–1976)
- Gerry Conway (1976)
- Archie Goodwin (1976–1978)

Editor-in-chief

- Jim Shooter (1978–1987)
- Tom DeFalco (1987–1994)
- No overall; separate group editors-in-chief (1994–1995)
  - Bob Budiansky, Spider-Man Group
  - Bobbie Chase, Marvel Edge
  - Mark Gruenwald, Marvel Universe (Avengers & Cosmic)
  - Bob Harras, X-Men Group
  - Carl Potts, Marvel Comics (licensed property titles only)
- Bob Harras (1995–2000)
- Joe Quesada (2000–2011)
- Axel Alonso (2011–2017)
- C. B. Cebulski (2017–2026)
- Stephen Wacker (2026–present)

=== Executive Editors ===
Originally called associate editor when Marvel's chief editor just carried the title of editor, the title of the second-highest editorial position became executive editor under the chief editor title of editor-in-chief. The title of associate editor later was revived under the editor-in-chief as an editorial position in charge of few titles under the direction of an editor and without an assistant editor.

Associate Editor

- Jim Shooter, January 5, 1976 – January 2, 1978

Executive Editor

- Tom DeFalco, 1983–1987
- Mark Gruenwald, 1987–1991; Senior Executive Editor: 1991–1995
- Carl Potts, Epic Comics Executive Editor, 1989–1995
- Bob Budiansky, Special Projects Executive Editor, 1991–1995
- Bobbie Chase, 1995–2001
- Tom Brevoort, 2007–present
- Axel Alonso, 2010–January 2011
- Dan Buckley, Midnight Universe Executive Editor, 2026-mid-2027

== Ownership ==
- Martin Goodman (1939–1968)

Parent corporation

- Magazine Management Co. (1968–1973)
- Cadence Industries (1973–1986)
- Marvel Entertainment Group (1986–1998)
- Marvel Enterprises, Inc. (1998–2005)
- Marvel Entertainment, Inc (2005–2009)
- Marvel Entertainment, LLC (2009–2023, a wholly owned subsidiary of The Walt Disney Company)
- Disney Publishing Worldwide (2023–present)

== Offices ==
Located in New York City, Marvel has had successive headquarters:

- in the McGraw-Hill Building, where it originated as Timely Comics in 1939
- in suite 1401 of the Empire State Building
- at 635 Madison Avenue (the actual location, though the comic books' indicia listed the parent publishing-company's address of 625 Madison Ave.)
- 575 Madison Avenue;
- 387 Park Avenue South
- 10 East 40th Street
- 417 Fifth Avenue
- a 60,000-square-foot (5,600 m^{2}) space in the Sports Illustrated Building at 135 W. 50th Street (October 2010– present)

== Productions ==
=== TV ===
Animated

Series	Aired	Production	Distributor	Network	Episodes
The Marvel Super Heroes	1966	Grantray-Lawrence Animation / Marvel Comics Group	Krantz Films	ABC	65
Fantastic Four	1967–68	Hanna-Barbera Productions / Marvel Comics Group	Taft Broadcasting	ABC	20
Spider-Man	1967–70	Grantray-Lawrence Animation / Krantz Films / Marvel Comics Group		ABC	52
The New Fantastic Four	1978	DePatie-Freleng Enterprises / Marvel Comics Animation	Marvel Entertainment	NBC	13
Fred and Barney Meet the Thing	1979	Hanna-Barbera Productions / Marvel Comics Group	Taft Broadcasting	NBC	13 (26 segments of The Thing)
Spider-Woman	1979–80	DePatie-Freleng Enterprises / Marvel Comics Animation	Marvel Entertainment	ABC	16

== Market share ==
In 2017, Marvel held a 38.30% share of the comics market, compared to its competitor DC Comics' 33.93%. By comparison, the companies respectively held 33.50% and 30.33% shares in 2013, and 40.81% and 29.94% shares in 2008.

== Marvel characters in other media ==
Marvel characters and stories have been adapted to multiple media platforms. Some of these adaptations were produced by Marvel Comics and its sister company, Marvel Studios, while others were produced by companies licensing Marvel material.

=== Games ===
In June 1993, Marvel issued its collectable caps for milk caps game under the Hero Caps brand. In 2014, the Marvel Disk Wars: The Avengers Japanese TV series was launched together with a collectible game called Bachicombat, a game similar to the milk caps game, by Bandai.

==== Collectible card games ====
The RPG industry brought the development of the collectible card game (CCG) in the early 1990s which there were soon Marvel characters were featured in CCG of their own starting in 1995 with Fleer's OverPower (1995–1999). Later collectible card game were:

- Marvel Superstars (2010–?) Upper Deck Company
- ReCharge Collectible Card Game (2001–?) Marvel
- Vs. System (2004–2009, 2014–) Upper Deck Company
- X-Men Trading Card Game (2000–?) Wizards of the Coast
- Marvel Champions: The Card Game (2019–present) Fantasy Flight Games, a Living Card Game

=== Miniatures ===
- Marvel Crisis Protocol (Fall 2019–) Atomic Mass Games
- HeroClix, WizKids

==== Role-playing ====
TSR published the pen-and-paper role-playing game Marvel Super Heroes in 1984. TSR then released in 1998 the Marvel Super Heroes Adventure Game which used a different system, the card-based SAGA system, than their first game. In 2003 Marvel Publishing published its own role-playing game, the Marvel Universe Roleplaying Game, that used a diceless stone pool system. In August 2011 Margaret Weis Productions announced it was developing a tabletop role-playing game based on the Marvel universe, set for release in February 2012 using its house Cortex Plus RPG system.

==== Video games ====
Video games based on Marvel characters go back to 1984 and the Atari 2600 game, Spider-Man. Since then several dozen video games have been released and all have been produces by outside licensees. In 2014, Disney Infinity 2.0: Marvel Super Heroes was released that brought Marvel characters to the existing Disney sandbox video game.

=== Films ===
As of the start of September 2015, films based on Marvel's properties represent the highest-grossing U.S. franchise, having grossed over $7.7 billion as part of a worldwide gross of over $18 billion. As of 2024, the Marvel Cinematic Universe (MCU) has grossed over $32 billion.

=== Live shows ===
- Spider-Man's Wedding (1987)
- Spider-Man On Stage (1999)
- Spider-Man Stunt Show: A Stunt Spectacular (2002–2004)
- Spider-Man Live! (2002–2003)
- The Marvel Experience (2014–)
- Marvel Universe Live! (2014–) live arena show
- Spider-Man: Turn Off the Dark (2011–2014) a Broadway musical

=== Prose novels ===
Marvel first licensed two prose novels to Bantam Books, who printed The Avengers Battle the Earth Wrecker by Otto Binder (1967) and Captain America: The Great Gold Steal by Ted White (1968). Various publishers took up the licenses from 1978 to 2002. Also, with the various licensed films being released beginning in 1997, various publishers put out film novelizations. In 2003, following publication of the prose young adult novel Mary Jane, starring Mary Jane Watson from the Spider-Man mythos, Marvel announced the formation of the publishing imprint Marvel Press. However, Marvel moved back to licensing with Pocket Books from 2005 to 2008. With few books issued under the imprint, Marvel and Disney Books Group relaunched Marvel Press in 2011 with the Marvel Origin Storybooks line.

=== Television programs ===
Many television series, both live-action and animated, have based their productions on Marvel Comics characters. These include series for popular characters such as Spider-Man, Iron Man, the Hulk, the Avengers, the X-Men, Fantastic Four, the Guardians of the Galaxy, Daredevil, Jessica Jones, Luke Cage, Iron Fist, the Punisher, the Defenders, S.H.I.E.L.D., Agent Carter, Deadpool, Legion, and others. Additionally, a handful of television films, usually also pilots, based on Marvel Comics characters have been made.

=== Theme parks ===
Marvel has licensed its characters for theme parks and attractions, including Marvel Super Hero Island at Universal Orlando's Islands of Adventure in Orlando, Florida, which includes rides based on their iconic characters and costumed performers, as well as The Amazing Adventures of Spider-Man ride cloned from Islands of Adventure to Universal Studios Japan.

Years after Disney purchased Marvel in late 2009, Walt Disney Parks and Resorts plans on creating original Marvel attractions at their theme parks, with Hong Kong Disneyland becoming the first Disney theme park to feature a Marvel attraction. Due to the licensing agreement with Universal Studios, signed prior to Disney's purchase of Marvel, Walt Disney World and Tokyo Disney Resort are barred from having Marvel characters in their parks. However, this only includes characters that Universal is currently using, other characters in their "families" (X-Men, Avengers, Fantastic Four, etc.), and the villains associated with said characters. This clause has allowed Walt Disney World to have meet and greets, merchandise, attractions and more with other Marvel characters not associated with the characters at Islands of Adventures, such as Star-Lord and Gamora from Guardians of the Galaxy.

== Imprints ==
- Marvel Comics
- Marvel Press, joint imprint with Disney Books Group
- Marvel Knights
- Icon Comics (creator owned)
- Infinite Comics
- Timely Comics
- MAX
- 20th Century Comics
- Ultimate Universe

=== Disney Kingdoms ===
Marvel Worldwide with Disney announced in October 2013 that in January 2014 it would release its first comic book title under their joint Disney Kingdoms imprint Seekers of the Weird, a five-issue miniseries inspired by a never built Disneyland attraction Museum of the Weird. Marvel's Disney Kingdoms imprint has since released comic adaptations of Big Thunder Mountain Railroad, Walt Disney's Enchanted Tiki Room, The Haunted Mansion, two series on Figment based on Journey Into Imagination.

=== Defunct ===
- Amalgam Comics
- CrossGen
- Curtis Magazines/Marvel Magazine Group
  - Marvel Monsters Group
- Epic Comics (creator owned) (1982–2004)
- Malibu Comics (1994–1997)
- Marvel 2099 (1992–1998)
- Marvel Absurd
- Marvel Age/Adventures
- Marvel Books
- Marvel Edge
- Marvel Knights
- Marvel Illustrated
- Marvel Mangaverse
- Marvel Music
- Marvel Next
- Marvel Noir
- Marvel UK
  - Marvel Frontier
- MC2
- New Universe
- Paramount Comics (co-owned with Viacom's Paramount Pictures)
- Razorline
- Star Comics
- Tsunami
- Ultimate Comics

== See also ==
- List of comics characters which originated in other media
- List of magazines released by Marvel Comics in the 1970s
- Lists of Marvel Comics characters
- List of current Marvel Comics publications
- List of Timely and Atlas Comics publications

== Bibliography ==
- George, Milo (2001). Jack Kirby: The TCJ Interviews. Fantagraphics Books. ISBN 1-56097-434-6.
- Howe, Sean (2012). Marvel Comics: the Untold Story. HarperCollins. ISBN 978-0-06-199210-0.
- Jones, Gerard (2004). Men of Tomorrow: Geeks, Gangsters, and the Birth of the Comic Book. Basic Books. ISBN 0-465-03657-0.
- Lupoff, Dick; Thompson, Don (1997). All in Color for a Dime. Krause Publications. ISBN 0-87341-498-5.
- Steranko, James (1971). The Steranko History of Comics. Vol. 1. Supergraphics. ISBN 0-517-50188-0.
