= List of comics characters which originated in other media =

This list is for original fictional characters created for adaptations of comic books in other forms of media (television series, films, books, games and advertising).

It includes characters like Firestar and X-23 that were later incorporated into mainstream comics. The category does not include preexisting characters from fiction (books, film, television, etc.) such as Dracula, Conan or Rima that were later incorporated into comics. Characters unique to certain media, such as Rachel Dawes, are not included on this list because they do not have counterparts in any mainstream comic.

== DC Comics ==
- Apache Chief
- Andrea Beaumont
- Baby Doll
- Black Vulcan
- Cinderblock
- Alex Danvers
- John Diggle
- El Dorado
- Egghead
- Nora Fries
- Gleek
- Gray Ghost
- Mercy Graves
- Inspector William Henderson
- Isis
- Aqualad (Kaldur'ahm)
- Lock-Up
- Lionel Luthor
- Más y Menos
- Batman (Terry McGinnis)
- Renee Montoya
- Music Meister
- Non
- Jimmy Olsen
- Harley Quinn
- Red X
- Roxy Rocket
- Samurai
- Chloe Sullivan
- King Tut
- Ursa
- Superwoman (Kristin Wells)
- Wendy, Marvin and Wonder Dog
- Perry White
- Wonder Twins

== Marvel Comics ==
- Phil Coulson
- Firestar
- Leo Fitz
- H.E.R.B.I.E.
- Icemaster
- Melinda May
- Erik Selvig
- Jemma Simmons
- Luna Snow
- Spyke
- Abraham Whistler
- X-23

== Other publishers ==
- Cammy
- Jessica Priest
- Launchpad McQuack
