= Irwin Donenfeld =

American publisher

- Born: March 1, 1926; New York City, U.S.
- Died: November 29, 2004 (aged 78); Norwalk, Connecticut, U.S.
- Occupation: DC Comics publishing executive
- Spouse(s): Arlene Levy (first marriage); Alice Greenbaum (second marriage); Carole Schnapp, née Liebowitz (third marriage)
- Children: 5
- Parent(s): Harry Donenfeld and Gussie Weinstein
- Awards: Inkpot Award (2001)

Irwin Donenfeld (/ˈdɒnənfɛld/; March 1, 1926 – November 29, 2004) was an American comic book publishing executive for DC Comics. Donenfeld co-owned the firm from 1948 to 1967, holding the positions of Editorial Director (1952–1957) and Executive Vice President (1958 – c. 1968). He was the son of Harry Donenfeld, co-founder of the company.

== Biography ==
=== Early life and education ===
Donenfeld was born in the Bronx, New York City, to a Romanian-Jewish family. A teenager when Superman and Batman debuted in 1938/1939, and son of the characters' publisher, Donenfeld often claimed he was the first kid in America to read the adventures of two of the world's most famous superheroes.

Donenfeld attended New York's Columbia Grammar School. He was a notable student athlete, playing baseball and football. During World War II he served in the Air Force, where he boxed, and was covered by The Ring magazine. After college, Donenfeld attended Bates College, in Lewiston, Maine.

=== Early career ===
Donenfeld joined DC (officially known by its parent company name National Periodical Publications; although it is generally understood to stand for Detective Comics, Irwin insisted in an early 21st Century interview that DC actually stood for Donenfeld Comics) in 1948 at the age of 22, becoming a co-owner with his father and Jack S. Liebowitz. A recent college graduate, he was already married and had a child.

=== DC Editorial Director ===
Becoming the company's editorial director in 1952, in the mid-1950s, Donenfeld and publisher Liebowitz directed editor Julius Schwartz (whose roots lay in the science-fiction book market) to produce a one-shot Flash story in the try-out title Showcase. Instead of reviving the old character, Schwartz had writers Robert Kanigher and John Broome, penciler Carmine Infantino, and inker Joe Kubert create an entirely new super-speedster, updating and modernizing the Flash's civilian identity, costume, and origin with a science-fiction bent. The Flash's reimagining in Showcase #4 (October 1956) proved sufficiently popular that it soon led to a similar revamping of the Green Lantern character, the introduction of the modern all-star team Justice League of America (JLA), and many more superheroes, heralding what historians and fans call the Silver Age of comic books.

=== DC Executive Vice President ===
Donenfeld became the company's executive vice president in 1958. In 1964 he gave editors Julius Schwartz and top artist Carmine Infantino a deadline of six months to turn the then-flagging Batman comic around, or it would be cancelled. Jettisoning such lightweight characters as Bat-Mite and Ace the Bat-Hound in favour of Aunt Harriet (the symbolic figure designed to combat Wertham-led claims of implied homosexuality between Batman and Robin), Batman gained his famous yellow chest symbol and moved from operating during the day to truly being a creature of the night.

A 1966 Batman TV show on the ABC network sparked a temporary spike in comic book sales, and a brief fad for superheroes in Saturday morning animation (Filmation created most of DC's initial cartoons) and other media. DC significantly lightened the tone of many DC comics – particularly Batman and Detective Comics – to better complement the "camp" tone of the TV series. This tone coincided with the infamous "Go-Go Checks" checkerboard cover-dress which featured a black-and-white checkerboard strip at the top of each comic, a misguided attempt by then-managing editor Donenfeld to make DC's output "stand out on the newsracks."

During this period, Donenfeld perceived a trend in the industry that comics featuring a gorilla on the cover, regardless of the context or relevance, would automatically correspond with an increase in sales for that title; he made sure that at least one DC title per month had a gorilla on the cover.

In late 1966/early 1967, Infantino was tasked by Donenfeld with designing covers for the entire DC line. After Donenfeld promoted Infantino to editorial director, they hired Dick Giordano as an editor in April 1968, with Giordano also bringing over to DC some of the creators he had nurtured at Charlton Comics. While none of his titles (such as Bat Lash and Deadman) was a commercial hit, many were critical successes.

During his period as Executive Vice President, Donenfeld made the decision to preserve the film negatives of the comics being published. This allowed the company to reprint many of the classic Silver Age comics in later treasury and trade paperback editions.

=== Later career ===
In 1967, Kinney National Company acquired National Periodical Publications (a.k.a. DC Comics), which shortly led to the ouster of Donenfeld from the company. He moved to Westport, Connecticut, eventually becoming involved in the maritime business (Coastwide Marina).

=== Death ===
Donenfeld's last few years were marred by health problems. He died in 2004 of heart failure at Norwalk Hospital in Norwalk, Connecticut. He is buried in Mount Ararat Cemetery, East Farmingdale, New York.

== Personal life ==
Donenfeld was married three times. His first marriage was to Arlene Levy in 1946. The marriage ended in divorce in 1961. His second marriage (in 1963) was to Alice Greenbaum, an attorney and divorcee. Bob Kane had introduced them. Their marriage ended in divorce in 1970. Donenfeld's last marriage, in 1970, was to Carole Schnapp, the niece of fellow DC co-owner Jack Liebowitz. Donenfeld's sister Sonia was married for a time to American Comics Group co-owner Fred Iger. (Iger later married Irwin Donenfeld's ex-wife Arlene.)

== Awards ==
Donenfeld was the recipient of a 2001 Inkpot Award.
