= DC Comics =

American comic book publisher

- Logo used since 2024 (Note: This logo was previously used from 1977 to 2005.)
- Status: Active
- Founded: 1935; 91 years ago (as National Allied Publications); 1937; 89 years ago (as Detective Comics); 1939; 87 years ago (as All-American Publications); 1946; 80 years ago (as National Comics Publications); 1961; 65 years ago (as National Periodical Publications); 1977; 49 years ago (as DC Comics)
- Founder: Malcolm Wheeler-Nicholson; Harry Donenfeld; Jack Liebowitz; Max Gaines
- Country of origin: United States
- Headquarters location: 4000 Warner Boulevard, Burbank, California, U.S.
- Distribution: Lunar Distribution (direct market); Penguin Random House Publisher Services (bookstores)
- Key people: Jim Lee (President, Publisher, CCO); Anne DePies (SVP, General Manager); Marie Javins (EIC)
- Publication types: List of publications
- Fiction genres: Superhero; Fantasy; Science fiction; Action; Adventure
- Imprints: List of imprints
- Owners: Skydance Products & Publishing (Skydance)
- No. of employees: approx. 230
- Official website: dc.com

DC Comics (originally DC Comics, Inc., and also known simply as DC) is an American comic book publisher owned by Skydance under Skydance Products & Publishing. DC is an initialism for Detective Comics, a comic book series first published in 1937. DC Comics is one of the largest and oldest American comic book companies, the first comic under the DC banner being published in 1937.

Most of its published stories are set in the fictional DC Universe and feature numerous culturally iconic heroic characters, such as Superman, Batman, Wonder Woman, and the Flash; as well as famous fictional teams, including the Justice League, the Teen Titans, the Suicide Squad, and the Legion of Super-Heroes. The universe contains an assortment of well-known supervillains, such as Lex Luthor, the Joker, Darkseid, and the antiheroic Catwoman. The company has published non-DC Universe-related material, including Watchmen, V for Vendetta, Fables, and many other titles, under the alternative imprints Vertigo and DC Black Label.

Originally at 432 Fourth Avenue in Manhattan, New York City, the company offices have been located at 480 and later 575 Lexington Avenue, 909 Third Avenue, 75 Rockefeller Plaza, 666 Fifth Avenue, and 1325 Avenue of the Americas. DC Comics was located at 1700 Broadway in Midtown Manhattan until April 2015, when DC Entertainment transferred its headquarters to Burbank, California.

In 2017, approximately 70% of the American comic book market was shared by DC Comics and its long-time major competitor Marvel Comics, though this figure may be distorted because sales of graphic novels are excluded. As of 2025, in the comic book shop market, DC is the second-largest publisher of comic books, after Marvel, and Image Comics is third. In the bookstore market, DC is the second largest publisher of comic books, after Viz Media, and Marvel is third.

== History ==
=== National Allied Publications ===
==== Golden Age ====
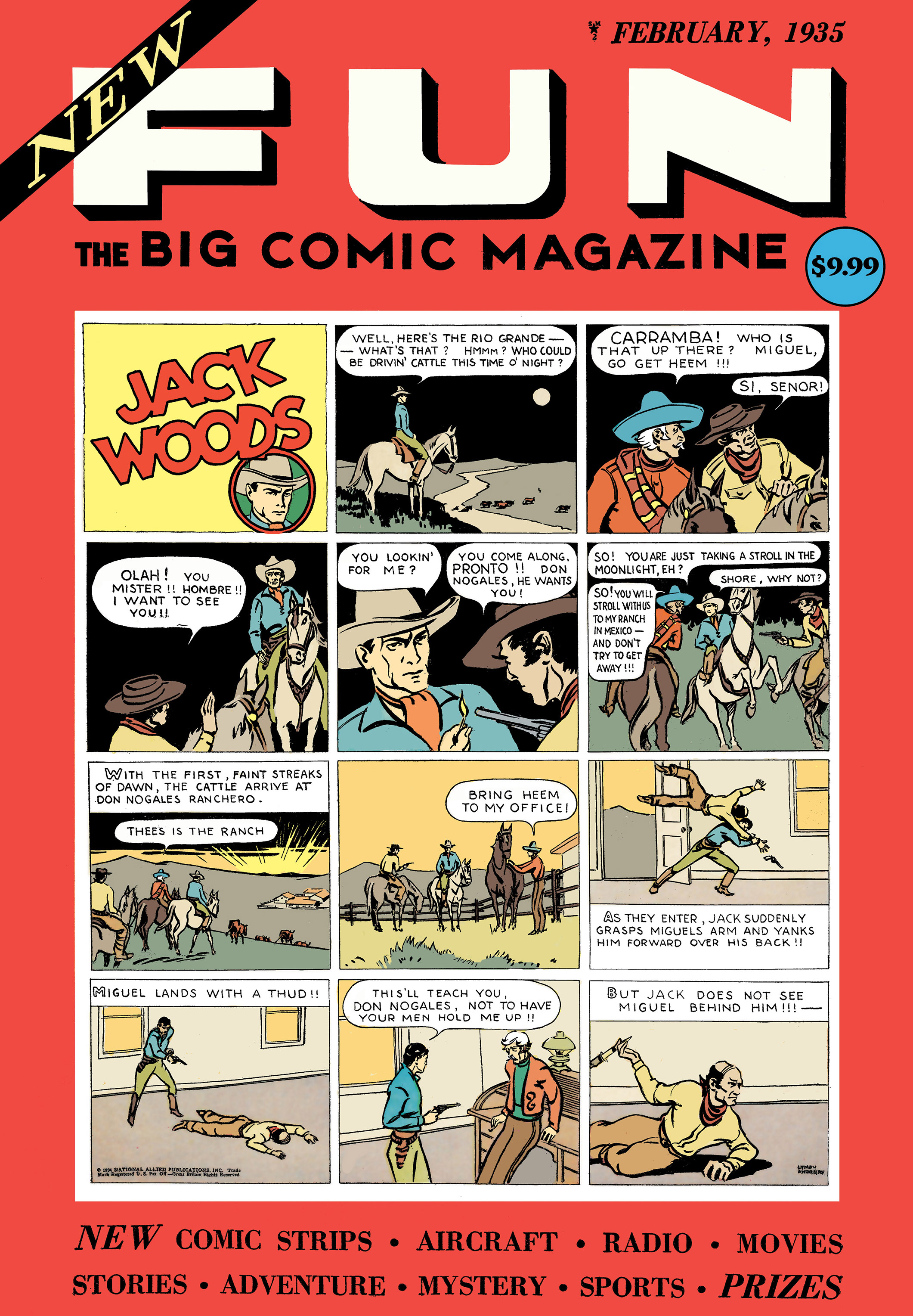
Cover art of the first comic book by National Allied Publications, New Fun: The Big Comic Magazine #1 (cover date: February 1935). Unlike earlier comic book magazines series, characters in this book (such as the Western character Jack Wood) were original creations that were not taken from existing comic strips.

In 1935, a forty-five year old former U.S. Army Major and pulp magazine writer Major Malcolm Wheeler-Nicholson founded National Allied Publications, intended as an American comic book publishing company. Its debut publication was the tabloid-sized New Fun: The Big Comic Magazine #1 (the first of a comic series later called More Fun Comics) with a February 1935 cover date. An anthology title, essentially for original stories not reprinted from newspaper strips, it was unlike many comic book series before it. While DC Comics is now primarily associated with superhero comics, the genres in the first anthology titles consisted of funnies, Western comics, and adventure-related stories. The character Doctor Occult—created by Jerry Siegel and Joe Shuster in December 1935 and included in issue No. 6 of New Fun Comics—is considered to be the earliest recurring superhero created by DC that is still being used. The company created a second recurring title called New Comics, first released in December 1935, which was the start of the long-running Adventure Comics series that also featured many anthology titles. By 1936, the group had become Nicholson Publishing.

Wheeler-Nicholson's next and final title, Detective Comics, was advertised with a cover illustration dated December 1936 but eventually premiered three months late with a March 1937 cover date. The themed anthology that revolved originally around fictional detective stories became in modern times the longest-running ongoing comic series. A notable debut in the first issue was Slam Bradley, created in a collaboration between Wheeler-Nicholson, Siegel and Shuster. In 1937, in debt to printing-plant owner and magazine distributor Harry Donenfeld—who also published pulp magazines and operated as a principal in the magazine distributorship Independent News—Wheeler-Nicholson had to enter into partnership with Donenfeld to publish Detective Comics No. 1, and Detective Comics, Inc. (which helped inspire the abbreviation DC) was formed, with Wheeler-Nicholson and Donenfeld's accountant Jack S. Liebowitz listed as owners. In 1938 Donenfeld and Liebowitz bought out Wheeler-Nicholson’s interest in the company, and under their sound management, DC grew into a more viable publishing operation. Shortly afterwards, Detective Comics, Inc. purchased the remains of National Allied (also known as Nicholson Publishing) at a bankruptcy auction and absorbed it.

The debuts of two famous superheroes—Superman and Batman—in Action Comics and Detective Comics.

Action Comics #1 (June 1938) introduced Superman and helped birth the superhero genre.

Detective Comics #27 (May 1939) featured the first appearance of Batman.

Meanwhile, Max Gaines formed the sister company All-American Publications in 1939. Detective Comics, Inc. soon launched a new anthology title called Action Comics; the first issue, cover dated June 1938, featured new characters such as Superman by Siegel and Shuster, Zatara by Fred Guardineer, and Tex Thompson by Ken Finch and Bernard Baily. Considered as the first comic book to feature the character archetype later known as the "superhero", Action Comics was a sales hit that brought to life a new age of comic books, now affectionately termed the "Golden Age". Action Comics #1 is credited as featuring the first appearance of Superman, both on the cover illustration and inside the issue, and is now one of the most valuable and sought-after comic book issues of all time. The comic book work exploded when Siegel and Shuster created Superman, ushering in a new tradition of heroic storytelling. The first Superman tale included a superhero origin story with the reveal of an unnamed planet, later known as Krypton, where he is said to have originated. The issue also contained the first essential supporting character and one of the earliest female characters in any comic, with Lois Lane as Superman's first depicted romantic interest. The Green Hornet-inspired character known as the Crimson Avenger by Jim Chamber was featured in Detective Comics No. 20 (October 1938). This character is known to be the first masked vigilante published by DC. An unnamed "office boy", retconned as Jimmy Olsen's first appearance, was revealed in a Superman story by Siegel and Shuster in Action Comics No. 6 (November 1938).

Starting in 1939, Siegel and Shuster's Superman was the first comic-derived character to appear in other formats, later featuring in his own newspaper comic strip, which first introduced his biological parents Jor-El and Lara. All-American Publications' debut comic series, All-American Comics, was first published in April 1939. The series Detective Comics made history as being the first to feature Batman—a Bob Kane and Bill Finger creation—in issue No. 27 (March 1939) with the request of more superhero titles. Batman was depicted as a masked vigilante who wore a caped suit known as the Batsuit and drove a car that was later referred to as the Batmobile. The Batman story also included a supporting character called James Gordon, the police commissioner of what would later become Gotham City Police Department. Despite being a parody, All-American Publications introduced the earliest female character who became the female superhero Red Tornado (though disguised as a male) in Ma Hunkel who first appeared in the "Scribbly" stories in All-American Comics No. 3 (June 1939). Another important Batman debut was the introduction of the fictional mansion known as Wayne Manor first seen in Detective Comics No. 28 (June 1939). The series Adventure Comics followed in the footsteps of Action Comics and Detective Comics by featuring a new recurring superhero called Sandman who first appeared in Adventure Comics No. 40 (July 1939). Action Comics No. 13 (June 1939) introduced the first recurring Superman enemy referred to as the Ultra-Humanite; created by Siegel and Shuster, this is commonly cited as one of the earliest supervillains in comic books. The Superman character had another breakthrough when he was given his own comic book series, which was previously unheard of. The first issue, published in June 1939, helped directly introduce Superman's adoptive parents, Jonathan and Martha Kent, also created by Siegel and Shuster. Detective Comics No. 29 (July 1939) included the first mention of Batman's utility belt by Gardner Fox. Outside of DC's publishing, a character later integrated as DC was introduced by Fox Feature Syndicate named the Blue Beetle released in August 1939. Fictional cities were a common theme of DC; the first revealed city was Superman's home city of Metropolis, originally named in Action Comics No. 16 (September 1939). Detective Comics No. 31 (September 1939) by Gardner Fox, Bob Kane and Sheldon Moldoff introduced a romantic interest for Batman named Julie Madison, as well as the Batarang weapon that Batman commonly uses, and the fictional aircraft called the Batplane. The story of Batman's origin was first shown in Detective Comics No. 33 (November 1939), which depicted the death of Thomas Wayne and Martha Wayne by a mugger. The origin story remained crucial for the fictional character after its inception. The Daily Planet (a common setting of Superman) was first named in a Superman newspaper strip around November 1939. Doll Man was the first superhero to be produced by Quality Comics, which DC now owns. Fawcett Comics was formed around 1939 and became DC's original competitor company over the next decade. At the end of 1944, All-American titles began using its own logo to distinguish it from the National comics.

All-American Publications, an affiliate concern co-owned by Gaines and Liebowitz, merged with Detective Comics, Inc. on September 30, 1946, forming National Comics Publications. (Note: In a 1947–1948 lawsuit filed by Jerry Siegel and Joe Shuster against National, the presiding judge noted in a "Findings of Facts": "DETECTIVE COMICS, INC. was a corporation duly organized and existing under the laws of the State of New York, and was one of the constituent corporations consolidated on September 30, 1946 into defendant NATIONAL COMICS PUBLICATIONS, INC.") The previous year, in June 1945, Gaines had allowed Liebowitz to buy him out and had retained only Picture Stories from the Bible as the foundation of his own new company, EC Comics. At that point, "Liebowitz promptly orchestrated the merger of All-American and Detective Comics into National Comics... Next he took charge of organizing National Comics, [the self-distributorship] Independent News, and their affiliated firms into a single corporate entity, National Periodical Publications". National Periodical Publications became publicly traded on the stock market in 1961. Despite the official names "National Comics" and "National Periodical Publications", the company began branding itself as "Superman-DC" as early as 1940 and became known colloquially as DC Comics for years before the official adoption of that name in 1977.

DC Comics began to move aggressively against what it saw as copyright-violating imitations from other companies, such as Fox Comics' Wonder Man, which (according to court testimony) Fox started as a copy of Superman. This extended to DC suing Fawcett Comics over Captain Marvel, who was at the time the top-selling comic character (see National Comics Publications, Inc. v. Fawcett Publications, Inc.). Faced with declining sales and the prospect of bankruptcy if it lost the lawsuit, Fawcett capitulated in 1953 and ceased publishing comics. Years later, Fawcett sold the rights for Captain Marvel to DC Comics, and in 1972 the character was revived in DC's new title Shazam!, which featured artwork by Captain Marvel's creator C. C. Beck. In the meantime, the abandoned 'Marvel' trademark had been seized by Marvel Comics in 1967, with the creation of their Captain Marvel, preventing DC from using the name in the title of their own comic series. While DC's Captain Marvel failed to recapture his earlier popularity, he later appeared in a Saturday morning live action TV adaptation and gained a prominent position in the mainstream continuity of the DC Universe.

As the popularity of superheroes faded in the late 1940s, DC Comics focused on such genres as science fiction, Westerns, humor, and romance. The company also published crime and horror titles, although relatively tame contributions that avoided the mid-1950s backlash against such comic genres. A handful of the most popular superhero titles continued publication, including Action Comics and Detective Comics, the medium's two longest-running titles.

Pioneers of DC Comics who started in the 1930s
Malcolm Wheeler-Nicholson	Jerry Siegel	Joe Shuster	Bob Kane	Bill Finger	Sheldon Mayer	Gardner Fox
Founder of DC Comics	Creators of Superman and Lois Lane		Creators of Batman and the Joker		Early founder	Created various characters

==== Silver Age ====
In the mid-1950s, editorial director Irwin Donenfeld and publisher Liebowitz directed editor Julius Schwartz (whose roots lay in the science-fiction book market) to produce a one-shot Flash story in the try-out title Showcase. Instead of reviving the old character, Schwartz had writers Robert Kanigher and John Broome, penciler Carmine Infantino, and inker Joe Kubert create Barry Allen, an entirely new super-speedster with a science-fiction bent. The Flash's reimagining in Showcase #4 (October 1956) proved sufficiently popular that it soon led to a similar revamping of the Green Lantern character, the introduction of the modern all-star team Justice League of America (JLA), and many more superheroes, heralding what historians and fans call the Silver Age of Comic Books.

National radically overhauled its continuing characters—primarily Superman, Batman, and Wonder Woman—rather than just reimagining them. The Superman family of titles, under editor Mort Weisinger, introduced such enduring characters as Supergirl, Bizarro, and Brainiac. The Batman titles, under editor Jack Schiff, introduced the successful Batwoman, Bat-Girl, Ace the Bat-Hound, and Bat-Mite in an attempt to modernize the strip with non-science-fiction elements. Schwartz and Infantino revitalized Batman in what the company promoted as the "New Look", with relatively down-to-earth stories re-emphasizing Batman as a detective. Meanwhile, editor Kanigher successfully introduced a whole family of Wonder Woman characters having fantastic adventures in a mythical realm.

Since the 1940s, when Superman, Batman, and many of the company's other heroes began appearing in stories together, DC's characters have inhabited a shared continuity that was later dubbed the "DC Universe" by fans. With the story "Flash of Two Worlds", in Flash #123 (September 1961), editor Schwartz (with writer Gardner Fox and artists Infantino and Joe Giella) presented a conceptual mechanism for slotting the 1930s and 1940s Golden Age heroes into this continuity using the explanation that they inhabited an other-dimensional "Earth 2", whilst the modern heroes exist on "Earth 1", consequently laying the foundations of what was later called the DC Multiverse.

=== National Periodical Publications ===
DC's introduction of the reimagined superheroes did not go unnoticed by their competitors. In 1961, with DC's JLA as the specific inducement, (Note: Apocryphal legend has it that in 1961, either Jack Liebowitz or Irwin Donenfeld of DC Comics (then known as National Periodical Publications) bragged about DC's success with the Justice League (which had debuted in The Brave and the Bold No. 28 (February 1960) before going on to its own title) to publisher Martin Goodman (whose holdings included the nascent Marvel Comics, which was being distributed by DC's Independent News at this time) during a game of golf. However, film producer and comics historian Michael Uslan partly debunked the story in a letter published in Alter Ego No. 43 (December 2004), pp. 43–44 Irwin said he never played golf with Goodman, so the story is untrue. I heard this story more than a couple of times while sitting in the lunchroom at DC's 909 Third Avenue and 75 Rockefeller Plaza office as Sol Harrison and [production chief] Jack Adler were schmoozing with some of us ... who worked for DC during our college summers ... [T]he way I heard the story from Sol was that Goodman was playing with one of the heads of Independent News, not DC Comics (though DC owned Independent News) ... As the distributor of DC Comics, this man certainly knew all the sales figures and was in the best position to tell this tidbit to Goodman. ... Of course, Goodman would want to be playing golf with this fellow and be in his good graces ... Sol worked closely with Independent News' top management over the decades and would have gotten this story straight from the horse's mouth. Goodman, a publishing trend-follower who was aware of DC's strong JLA sales, confirmably directed his comics editor, Stan Lee, to create a comic-book series about a team of superheroes. According to Lee: "Martin mentioned that he had noticed one of the titles published by National Comics seemed to be selling better than most. It was a book called The [sic] Justice League of America and it was composed of a team of superheroes. ... ' If the Justice League is selling ', spoke he, 'why don't we put out a comic book that features a team of superheroes?'") Marvel Comics' writer-editor Stan Lee and artist Jack Kirby ushered in the sub-Silver Age "Marvel Age" of comics with the debut issue of The Fantastic Four. Reportedly, DC dismissed the initial success of Marvel's editorial change until its consistently strengthening sales—albeit also benefiting DC's parent company Independent News, as Marvel's distributor—made it impossible to ignore. This commercial situation was highlighted by Marvel's superior sell-through percentage numbers which were typically 70% to DC's roughly 50%, meaning that DC's publications were barely making a profit after returns from the distributors were factored in, while Marvel was making a healthy profit by comparison. Also in 1961, both DC and Marvel increased their cover price from ten cents to twelve cents, while the rival publisher Dell Comics was charging fifteen cents.

At this time, the senior DC staff were reportedly unable to explain how this small publishing house was achieving its increasingly threatening commercial strength. For instance, when Marvel's product was examined in a meeting, the emphasis on more sophisticated character-based narrative and artist-driven visual storytelling was apparently overlooked. Instead, superficial reasons were put forward to account for the brand's popularity, like the presence of the color red or word balloons on the cover, or that the perceived crudeness of the interior art was somehow more appealing to readers. When Lee learned about DC's subsequent experimental attempts to imitate these perceived details, he amused himself by arranging direct defiance of those assumptions in Marvel's publications as sales strengthened further to frustrate the competition.

However, this ignorance of Marvel's true appeal did not extend to some of the writing talent during this period, and attempts were made to emulate Marvel's narrative approach. For instance, there was the Doom Patrol series by Arnold Drake (who had previously warned DC's management about Marvel's strength), a superhero team of outsiders who resented their freakish powers, which Drake later speculated was plagiarized by Stan Lee to create The X-Men. There was also the young Jim Shooter who purposely emulated Marvel's writing when he wrote for DC after studying both companies' styles, such as for the Legion of Super-Heroes feature. In 1966, National Periodical Publications established its own television arm, led by Allen Ducovny, to develop and produce TV projects, with Superman TV Corporation handling the distribution of NPP's shows.

A 1966 Batman TV show on the ABC network sparked a temporary spike in comic book sales and a brief fad for superheroes in Saturday morning animation (Filmation produced most of DC's initial cartoons) and other media. DC significantly lightened the tone of many of its comics—particularly Batman and Detective Comics—to better complement the "camp" tone of the TV series. This change in tone coincided with the prominent "Go-Go Checks" cover-dress that featured a black-and-white checkered strip at the top of each DC comic (all cover dates between February 1966 and August 1967), a misguided attempt by then-managing editor Irwin Donenfeld to make DC's output "stand out on the newsracks". In particular, DC artist Carmine Infantino complained that the distinctive cover made it easier for readers to spot DC's titles and avoid them in favor of Marvel's titles.

In 1967, Infantino (who had designed popular Silver Age characters Batgirl and the Phantom Stranger) rose from art director to become DC's editorial director. With the growing popularity of upstart rival Marvel Comics threatening to topple DC from its longtime number-one position in the comics industry, he tried to direct DC's focus towards marketing new and existing titles and characters with more adult sensibilities, aimed at an emerging older age group of superhero comic book fans; this was in response to Marvel's efforts to market their superhero line to college-aged adults. Infantino also recruited major talents such as ex-Marvel artist and Spider-Man co-creator Steve Ditko, and promising newcomers Neal Adams and Denny O'Neil, and he replaced some existing DC editors with artist-editors, including Joe Kubert and Dick Giordano, to give DC's output a more artistic critical eye.

=== Kinney National / Warner Communications (1967–1990) ===
In 1967, National Periodical Publications was purchased by Kinney National Company, which purchased Warner Bros.-Seven Arts in 1969. Kinney National spun off its non-entertainment assets in 1972 (as National Kinney Corporation) and changed its name to Warner Communications Inc.

In 1970, Jack Kirby moved from Marvel Comics to DC, at the end of the Silver Age of Comics, in which Kirby's contributions to Marvel played a large, integral role.

As artist Gil Kane described: "Jack was the single most influential figure in the turnaround in Marvel's fortunes from the time he rejoined the company ... It wasn't merely that Jack conceived most of the characters that are being done, but ... Jack's point of view and philosophy of drawing became the governing philosophy of the entire publishing company and, beyond the publishing company, of the entire field ... [Marvel took] Jack and use[d] him as a primer. They would get artists ... and they taught them the ABCs, which amounted to learning Jack Kirby ... Jack was like the Holy Scripture and they simply had to follow him without deviation. That's what was told to me ... It was how they taught everyone to reconcile all those opposing attitudes to one single master point of view."

Given carte blanche to write and illustrate his own stories, he created a handful of thematically-linked series he called collectively "The Fourth World". In the existing series Superman's Pal Jimmy Olsen and in his own, newly-launched series New Gods, Mister Miracle, and The Forever People, Kirby introduced such enduring characters and concepts as arch-villain Darkseid and the other-dimensional realm Apokolips. Furthermore, Kirby intended their stories to be reprinted in collected editions, in a publishing format that was later called the trade paperback, which became a standard industry practice decades later. While sales were respectable, they did not meet DC management's initially high expectations, and also suffered from a lack of comprehension and internal support from Infantino. By 1973 the "Fourth World" was all cancelled, although Kirby's conceptions soon became integral to the broadening of the DC Universe, especially after the major toy-company, Kenner Products, judged them ideal for their action-figure adaptation of the DC Universe, the Super Powers Collection. Obligated by his contract, Kirby created other unrelated series for DC, including Kamandi, The Demon, and OMAC, before ultimately returning to Marvel Comics in 1976.

==== Bronze Age ====
Following the science-fiction innovations of the Silver Age, the comics of the 1970s and 1980s became known as the Bronze Age, as fantasy gave way to more naturalistic and sometimes darker themes. Illegal drug use, banned by the Comics Code Authority, explicitly appeared in comics for the first time in Marvel Comics' story "Green Goblin Reborn!" in The Amazing Spider-Man #96 (May 1971), and after the Code's updating in response, DC offered a drug-fueled storyline in writer Dennis O'Neil and artist Neal Adams' Green Lantern, beginning with the story "Snowbirds Don't Fly" in the retitled Green Lantern/Green Arrow #85 (September 1971), which depicted Speedy, the teen sidekick of superhero archer Green Arrow, as having become a heroin addict.

Jenette Kahn, a former children's magazine publisher, replaced Infantino as editorial director in January 1976. As it happened, her first task even before being formally hired, was to convince Bill Sarnoff, the head of Warner Publishing, to keep DC as a publishing concern, as opposed to simply managing their licensing of their properties. With that established, DC had attempted to compete with the now-surging Marvel by dramatically increasing its output and attempting to win the market by flooding it. This included launching series featuring such new characters as Firestorm and Shade, the Changing Man, as well as an increasing array of non-superhero titles, in an attempt to recapture the pre-Wertham days of post-War comicdom.

=== DC Comics ===
In 1977, the company officially changed its name to DC Comics. It had used the brand "Superman-DC" since the 1950s, and was colloquially known as DC Comics for years.

In June 1978, five months before the release of the first Superman film, Kahn expanded the line further, increasing the number of titles and story pages, and raising the price from 35 cents to 50 cents. Most series received eight-page back-up features while some had full-length twenty-five-page stories. This was a move the company called the "DC Explosion". The move was not successful, however, and corporate parent Warner dramatically cut back on these largely unsuccessful titles, firing many staffers in what industry watchers dubbed "the DC Implosion". In September 1978, the line was dramatically reduced and standard-size books returned to 17-page stories but for a still increased 40 cents. By 1980, the books returned to 50 cents with a 25-page story count but the story pages replaced house ads in the books.

Seeking new ways to boost market share, the new team of publisher Kahn, vice president Paul Levitz, and managing editor Giordano addressed the issue of talent instability. To that end—and following the example of Atlas/Seaboard Comics and such independent companies as Eclipse Comics—DC began to offer royalties in place of the industry-standard work-for-hire agreement in which creators worked for a flat fee and signed away all rights, giving talent a financial incentive tied to the success of their work. As it happened, the implementation of these incentives proved opportune considering Marvel Comics' Editor-in-Chief, Jim Shooter, was alienating much of his company's creative staff with his authoritarian manner and major talents there went to DC like Roy Thomas, Gene Colan, Marv Wolfman, and George Pérez.

In addition, emulating the era's new television form, the miniseries, while addressing the matter of an excessive number of ongoing titles fizzling out within a few issues of their start, DC created the industry concept of the comic book limited series. This publishing format allowed for the deliberate creation of finite storylines within a more flexible publishing format that could showcase creations without forcing the talent into unsustainable open-ended commitments. The first such title was World of Krypton in 1979, and its positive results led to subsequent similar titles and later more ambitious productions like Camelot 3000 for the direct market in 1982.

These changes in policy shaped the future of the medium as a whole, and in the short term allowed DC to entice creators away from rival Marvel, and encourage stability on individual titles. In November 1980 DC launched the ongoing series The New Teen Titans, by writer Marv Wolfman and artist George Pérez, two popular talents with a history of success. Their superhero-team comic, superficially similar to Marvel's ensemble series X-Men, but rooted in DC history, earned significant sales in part due to the stability of the creative team, who both continued with the title for six full years. In addition, Wolfman and Pérez took advantage of the limited-series option to create a spin-off title, Tales of the New Teen Titans, to present origin stories of their original characters without having to break the narrative flow of the main series or oblige them to double their work load with another ongoing title.

==== Modern Age ====
This successful revitalization of the Silver Age Teen Titans led DC's editors to seek the same for the wider DC Universe. The result, the Wolfman/Pérez 12-issue limited series Crisis on Infinite Earths, gave the company an opportunity to realign and jettison some of the characters' complicated backstory and continuity discrepancies. A companion publication, two volumes entitled The History of the DC Universe, set out the revised history of the major DC characters. Crisis featured many key deaths that shaped the DC Universe for the following decades, and it separated the timeline of DC publications into pre- and post-"Crisis".

Meanwhile, a parallel update had started in the non-superhero and horror titles. Since early 1984, the work of British writer Alan Moore had revitalized the horror series The Saga of the Swamp Thing, and soon numerous British writers, including Neil Gaiman and Grant Morrison, began freelancing for the company. The resulting influx of sophisticated horror-fantasy material led to DC in 1993 establishing the Vertigo mature-readers imprint, which did not subscribe to the Comics Code Authority.

Two DC limited series, The Dark Knight Returns by Frank Miller and Watchmen by Moore and artist Dave Gibbons, drew attention in the mainstream press for their dark psychological complexity and promotion of the antihero. These titles helped pave the way for comics to be more widely accepted in literary-criticism circles and to make inroads into the book industry, with collected editions of these series as commercially successful trade paperbacks.

The mid-1980s also saw the end of many long-running DC war comics, including series that had been in print since the 1960s. These titles, all with over 100 issues, included Sgt. Rock, G.I. Combat, The Unknown Soldier, and Weird War Tales.

=== Time Warner / Time Warner Entertainment / AOL Time Warner (1990–2018) ===
In March 1989, Warner Communications merged with Time Inc., making DC Comics a subsidiary of Time Warner. In June, the first Tim Burton-directed Batman film was released, and DC began publishing its hardcover series of DC Archive Editions; these were collections of many of their early, key comics series, featuring rare and expensive stories previously unseen by the majority of modern fans. Much of the restoration work was handled by Rick Keene, with colour restoration performed by DC's long-time resident colourist Bob LeRose. The Archive Editions attempted to retroactively credit many of the writers and artists who had worked for DC without receiving much recognition during the early age of comic books when individual credits were rare.

The comics industry experienced a brief boom in the early 1990s, thanks to a combination of speculative purchasing—mass purchase of the books as collectible items, with the intention to resell at a higher value (as the rising value of older issues was thought to imply that all comics would rise dramatically in price)—and several storylines gaining attention from the mainstream media. DC's extended storylines in which Superman was killed, Batman was crippled, and Green Lantern turned into the supervillain Parallax, resulted in dramatically increased sales. However, the increases were temporary, and sales dropped off as the industry went into a major slump, while manufactured "collectables" numbering in the millions replaced quality with quantity until fans and speculators alike deserted the medium in droves.

DC's Piranha Press and other imprints (including the mature readers' line Vertigo, and Helix, a short-lived science fiction imprint) were introduced to facilitate compartmentalized diversification and allow for specialized marketing of individual product lines. They increased the use of non-traditional contractual arrangements, including the dramatic rise of creator-owned projects, leading to a significant increase in critically lauded work (much of it for Vertigo) and the licensing of material from other companies. DC also increased publication of book-store friendly formats, including trade paperback collections of individual serial comics, as well as original graphic novels.

One of the other imprints was Impact Comics from 1991 to 1992 in which the Archie Comics superheroes were licensed and revamped. The stories in the line were part of its own shared universe.

DC entered into a publishing agreement with Milestone Media that gave DC a line of comics featuring a culturally and racially diverse range of superhero characters. Although the Milestone line ceased publication after a few years, it yielded the popular animated series Static Shock. DC established Paradox Press to publish material such as the large-format Big Book of... series of multi-artist interpretations on individual themes, and such crime fiction as the graphic novel Road to Perdition. In 1998, DC purchased WildStorm Comics, Jim Lee's imprint under the Image Comics banner, continuing it for many years as a wholly separate imprint (and fictional universe) with its own unique style and audience. As part of this purchase, DC also began to publish titles under the fledgling WildStorm sub-imprint America's Best Comics (ABC), a series of titles created by Alan Moore which included The League of Extraordinary Gentlemen, Tom Strong, and Promethea. Moore strongly opposed this move, and DC eventually stopped publishing ABC.

In March 2003, DC acquired publishing and merchandising rights to the long-running fantasy series Elfquest, previously self-published by creators Wendy and Richard Pini under their WaRP Graphics publication banner. This series then followed another non-DC title, Tower Comics' series T.H.U.N.D.E.R. Agents, in collection into DC Archive Editions. In 2004, DC temporarily acquired the North American publishing rights to graphic novels from European publishers 2000 AD and Humanoids. It also rebranded its younger-audience titles with the mascot Johnny DC and established the CMX imprint to reprint translated manga. In 2006, CMX took over from Dark Horse Comics' publication of the webcomic Megatokyo in print form. DC also took advantage of the demise of Kitchen Sink Press and acquired the rights to much of the work of Will Eisner, such as his The Spirit series and his graphic novels.

In 2004, DC began laying the groundwork for a full continuity-reshuffling sequel to Crisis on Infinite Earths, promising substantial changes to the DC Universe (and side-stepping the 1994 Zero Hour: Crisis in Time! event, which similarly tried to retcon the history of the DCU). In 2005, the critically lauded Batman Begins film was released; also, the company published several limited series establishing increasingly escalating conflicts among DC's heroes, with events climaxing in the Infinite Crisis limited series. Immediately after this event, DC's ongoing series jumped forward a full year in their in-story continuity, as DC launched a weekly series, 52, to gradually fill in the missing time. Concurrently, DC lost the copyright to "Superboy" (while retaining the trademark) when the heirs of Jerry Siegel used a provision of the 1976 revision to the copyright law to regain ownership.

In 2005, DC launched its "All-Star" line (evoking the title of the 1940s publication), designed to feature some of the company's best-known characters in stories that eschewed the long and convoluted continuity of the DC Universe. The line began with All Star Batman & Robin, the Boy Wonder and All-Star Superman, while All-Star Wonder Woman and All-Star Batgirl were announced in 2006, but neither of these stories had been released or scheduled as of 2026.

By 2007, DC was licensing characters from the Archie Comics imprint Red Circle Comics. They appeared in the Red Circle line, based in the DC Universe, with a series of one-shots followed by a miniseries that led into two ongoing titles that each lasted for ten issues.

=== DC Entertainment ===
In 2011, DC rebooted all of its running titles following the Flashpoint storyline. The reboot called The New 52 gave new origin stories and costume designs to many of DC's characters.

DC licensed pulp characters including Doc Savage and the Spirit which it then used, along with some DC heroes, as part of the First Wave comics line launched in 2010 and lasting through fall 2011.

In May 2011, DC announced it would begin releasing digital versions of their comics on the same day as paper versions.

On June 1, 2011, DC announced that it would end all ongoing series set in the DC Universe in August and relaunch its comic line with 52 issue #1s, starting with Justice League on August 31 (written by Geoff Johns and drawn by Jim Lee), with the rest to follow later on in September.

On June 4, 2013, DC started DC^{2} and DC^{2} Multiverse. DC^{2} was for Batman '66 while DC^{2} Multiverse was for Batman: Arkham Origins.

In 2014, DC announced an eight-issue miniseries titled Convergence which began in April 2015.

In 2016, DC announced a line-wide relaunch titled DC Rebirth. The new line would launch with an 80-page one-shot titled DC Universe: Rebirth, written by Geoff Johns, with art from Gary Frank, Ethan Van Sciver, and more. After that, many new series would launch with a twice-monthly release schedule and new creative teams for nearly every title. The relaunch was meant to bring back the legacy and heart many felt had been missing from DC characters since the launch of the New 52. Rebirth brought huge success, both financially and critically.

In January 2018, DC held an event in the now-defunct Newseum in Washington D.C. The event featured a pop-up shop with autograph opportunities, panel discussions with stars and producers from Arrow, DC's Legends of Tomorrow, The Flash, Gotham, Supergirl, and Freedom Fighters: The Ray, comic book authors and artists, and premiere screenings of Black Lightning and Batman: Gotham By Gaslight.

=== WarnerMedia / Warner Bros. Discovery unit (2018–2026) ===
On February 21, 2020, the Co-Publisher of DC Comics, Dan DiDio stepped down after 10 years at that position. The company did not give a reason for the move, nor did it indicate whether it was his decision or the company's. The leadership change was the latest event in the company restructuring which began the previous month, as several top executives were laid off from the company. However, Bleeding Cool reported that he was fired.

In June 2020, Warner Bros. announced a separate DC-themed online-only convention. Known as DC FanDome, the free "immersive virtual fan experience" was a 24-hour-long event held on August 22, 2020. The main presentation, entitled "DC FanDome: Hall of Heroes", was held as scheduled on August 22. The remaining programming was provided through a one-day video on demand experience, "DC FanDome: Explore the Multiverse", on September 12.

As Warner Bros. and DC's response to San Diego Comic-Con's cancellation due to the COVID-19 pandemic, the convention featured information about DC-based content including the DC Extended Universe film franchise, the Arrowverse television franchise, comic books, and video games. The convention also returned for the virtual premiere of Wonder Woman 1984 and returned once again on October 16, 2021.

In August 2020, roughly one-third of DC's editorial ranks were laid off, including the editor-in-chief, senior story editor, executive editor, and several senior VPs.

In March 2021, DC relaunched their entire line once again under the banner of Infinite Frontier. After the events of the Dark Nights: Death Metal storyline, the DC Multiverse was expanded into a larger "Omniverse" where everything is canon, effectively reversing the changes The New 52 introduced a decade prior.

Furthermore, AT&T spun off WarnerMedia to Discovery, forming Warner Bros. Discovery. This merger was completed on April 8, 2022.

In January 2023, DC relaunched their line under the banner of Dawn of DC following the conclusion of Dark Crisis on Infinite Earths and Lazarus Planet. Later that year, Jim Lee was promoted to President of DC in May.

=== Skydance unit (2026–present) ===
Following the acquisition of Warner Bros. Discovery by Paramount Skydance, DC became a unit of Skydance Products & Publishing.

== Logo ==
- The November 1941 DC titles introduced an updated logo. This was almost twice the size of the previous version and the first with a white background. The name "Superman" was added to "A DC Publication", effectively acknowledging both Superman and Batman. This logo was the first to occupy the top-left corner of the cover, where the logo has generally resided ever since. The company began to refer to itself in its advertising as "Superman-DC".
- When Jenette Kahn became DC's publisher in late 1976, she commissioned graphic designer Milton Glaser to design a new company logo. Popularly referred to as the "DC bullet", this logo premiered on the February 1977 titles. Although it varied in size and colour, was at times cropped by the edges of the cover, and was briefly rotated by 4 degrees, the logo remained essentially unchanged for almost three decades. Despite the various logo changes since 2005, the old "DC bullet" continues to be used only on the DC Archive Editions series.
- On May 8, 2005, a new logo (dubbed the "DC spin") was unveiled, debuting on DC titles in June 2005 with DC Special: The Return of Donna Troy No. 1 and the rest of the titles the following week. As well as being used for comics, the new logo was designed for DC properties in other media, including films since Batman Begins (with Superman Returns showing the logo's normal variant), the TV series Smallville, the animated series Justice League Unlimited and others, as well as for collectibles and other merchandise. The "DC Spin" logo was designed by Josh Beatman of Brainchild Studios and DC executive Richard Bruning.
- In March 2012, DC unveiled a new logo designed by Landor Associates, which consists of a letter "D" peeling back to reveal the letter "C". The logo was intended to signify the concept of superheroes having "dual" identities and was adaptable across different mediums.
- In May 2016, in conjunction with the DC Rebirth, DC replaced the "peel" logo with a circular logo reminiscent of the 1972 logo.
- In July 2024, an updated version of Glaser's 1977 "Bullet" logo was unveiled during San Diego Comic-Con, as well as an accompanying intro sequence featuring Superman for DC Studios.

=== Gallery ===
1977–2005, aka the "DC Bullet" (first era logo)

2005–2012, aka the "DC Spin"

2012–2016, aka the "DC Peel"

2016–2024, logo introduced with the DC Rebirth relaunch

2024–present, aka the "DC Bullet" in blue shade (second era / return logo)

== Imprints ==
=== Active ===
- DC (1937–present)
  - Elseworlds (1989–2010, 2024–present)
  - Vertigo Comics (1993–2020, 2024–present)
  - WildStorm (1999–2010, 2017–present)
  - Earth-M (1993–1997, 2018–present)
  - DC Black Label (2018–present)
  - DC Graphic Novels for Young Adults (2020–present)
  - DC Graphic Novels for Kids (2020–present)
  - DC Horror (2021–present)
  - DC Compact Comics (2024–present)
  - Absolute Universe (2024–present)
- Mad (1953–present)

=== Defunct ===
- DC Archive Editions (1989–2014; replaced by DC Omnibus)
- Piranha Press (1989–1993; renamed Paradox Press)
- Impact Comics (1991–1993; licensed from Archie Comics)
- Amalgam Comics (1996–1997; jointly with Marvel Comics)
- Helix (1996–1998; merged with Vertigo)
- Tangent Comics (1997–1998)
- Paradox Press (1998–2003)
- WildStorm Productions (1999–2010)
  - America's Best Comics (1999–2005)
  - Homage Comics (1999–2004; merged to form WildStorm Signature)
  - Cliffhanger (1999–2004; merged to form WildStorm Signature)
  - WildStorm Signature (2004–2006; merged with main WildStorm line)
  - CMX Manga (2004–2010)
- DC Focus (2004–2005; merged with main DC line)
- Johnny DC (2004–2012)
- All Star (2005–2008)
- Minx (2007–2008)
- Zuda Comics (2007–2010)
- First Wave (2010–2011; licensed from Condé Nast Publications and Will Eisner Library)
- Young Animal (2016–2021)
- Sandman Universe (2018–2024)
- Wonder Comics (2018–2021)
- DC Ink (2019; replaced by DC Graphic Novels for Young Adults)
- DC Zoom (2019; replaced by DC Graphic Novels for Kids)
- Hill House Comics (2019–2022)

== Initiatives ==
- The New 52 (2011–2016)
- DC Rebirth (2016–2017)
- New Justice (2018–2021)
- Infinite Frontier (2021–2023)
- Dawn of DC (2023–2024)
- DC All In (2024–present)
  - DC Next Level (2026–present)

== See also ==
- Batman Day
- DC Collectibles
- DC Cosmic Cards
- DC Extended Universe
- DC Studios
- List of comics characters which originated in other media
- List of current DC Comics publications
- Lists of DC Comics characters
- List of films based on DC Comics publications
- List of television series based on DC Comics publications
- List of unproduced DC Comics projects
- List of video games based on DC Comics
- Publication history of DC Comics crossover events

== Bibliography ==
- Jones, Gerard (2004). Men of Tomorrow: Geeks, Gangsters, and the Birth of the Comic Book. Basic Books. ISBN 978-0-465-03656-1.
- Tucker, Reed (2017). Slugfest: Inside the Epic, 50-year Battle Between Marvel and DC. Perseus Books Group. ISBN 978-0-3068-2546-0.
