= More Fun Comics =

American comic book anthology

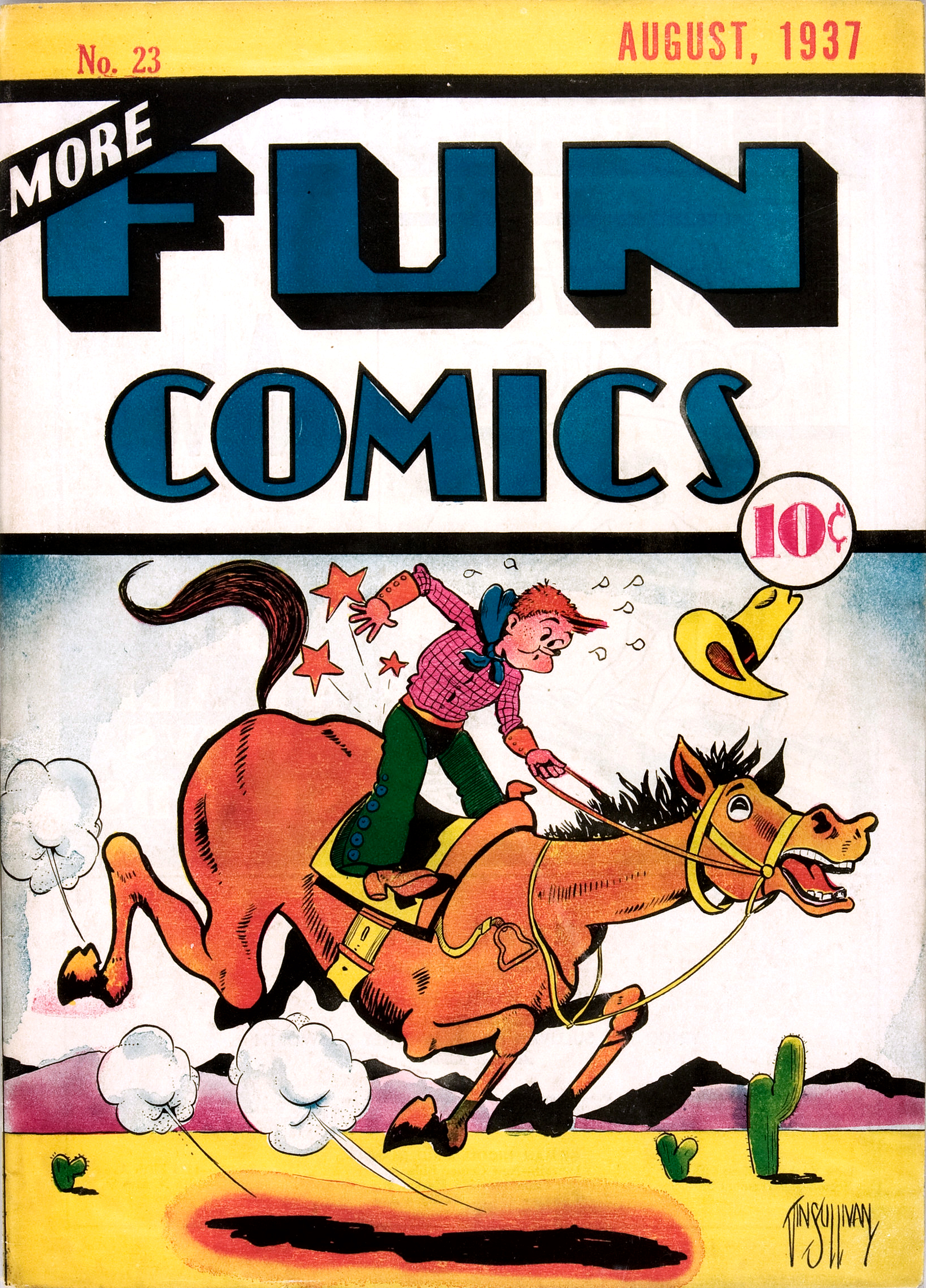
- More Fun Comics #23 (Aug. 1937), art by Vin Sullivan.

Publication information
- Publisher: National Allied Publications
- Schedule: Monthly: #1–4, #7–90, #108–126; Bi-monthly: #5–6, #91–107, #127
- Format: Ongoing series
- Publication date: February 1935 – November/December 1947
- No. of issues: 127
- Main character(s): Doctor Occult, Spectre, Doctor Fate, Johnny Quick, Green Arrow, Aquaman, Superboy, "Jimminy and the Magic Book"

More Fun Comics, originally titled New Fun: The Big Comic Magazine, is a 1935–1947 American comic book anthology that introduced several major superhero characters and was the first American comic book series to feature solely original material rather than reprints of newspaper comic strips. It was also the first publication of National Allied Publications, the company that would become DC Comics.

== Publication history ==
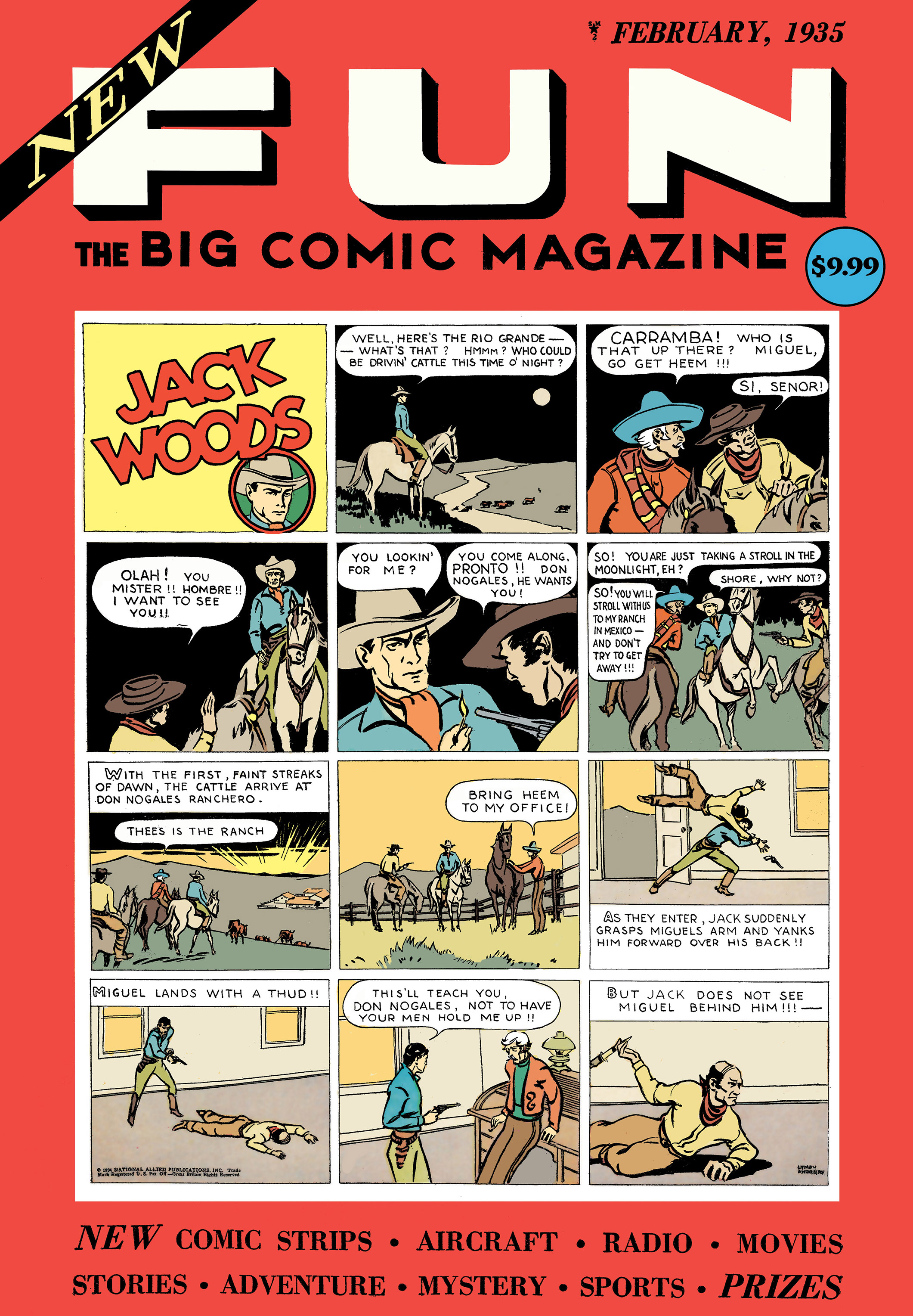
Cover of the first issue of New Fun (Feb. 1935)

Having seen the emergence of Famous Funnies and other oversize magazines reprinting comic strips, Malcolm Wheeler-Nicholson founded National Allied Publications and published New Fun #1 on January 11, 1935 (cover-dated February 1935). A tabloid-sized, 10-inch by 15-inch, 36-page magazine with a cardstock, non-glossy cover, it was an anthology of humor features, such as the talking animal comic "Pelion and Ossa" and the college-set "Jigger and Ginger", mixed with dramatic fare as the Western strip "Jack Woods" and the "yellow peril" adventure "Barry O'Neill", featuring a Fu Manchu-styled villain, Fang Gow. The first issue also featured humor strip "Caveman Capers", an adaptation of the 1819 novel Ivanhoe, spy drama "Sandra of the Secret Service", and a strip based on early Walt Disney creation Oswald the Lucky Rabbit. Most of the stories were presented as serials.

Most significantly, however, whereas some of the existing publications included a small amount of original material, generally as filler, New Fun #1 was the first comic book containing all-original material. Additionally, it carried advertising, whereas previous comic books were ad-free and sponsored by corporations such as Procter & Gamble, Kinney Shoes, and Canada Dry.

The first four issues were edited by future Funnies, Inc. founder Lloyd Jacquet, the next, after a three-month hiatus, by Wheeler-Nicholson himself. Issue #6 (Oct. 1935) saw the comic book debuts of Jerry Siegel and Joe Shuster, the future creators of Superman, who began their careers with the musketeer swashbuckler "Henri Duval" (doing the first two installments before turning it over to others) and, under the pseudonyms "Leger and Reuths", the supernatural adventurer Doctor Occult. Siegel and Shuster remained on the latter title through issue #32 (June 1938), following the magazine's retitling as More Fun (issues #7–8, Jan.-Feb. 1936), and More Fun Comics (#9-on).

In issue #101 (Feb. 1945), Siegel and Shuster introduced Superboy, a young version of Superman.

With issue #108 (March 1946), all the superhero features were moved from More Fun into Adventure Comics. More Fun became a humor title that spotlighted the children's fantasy feature "Jimminy and the Magic Book". The series was canceled with issue #127 (Dec 1947).

== Features include ==
- Doctor Occult – New Fun #6 – More Fun #32
- Spectre – More Fun #52–101
- Doctor Fate – More Fun #55–98
- Congo Bill – More Fun #56–67
- Johnny Quick – More Fun #71–107
- Green Arrow – More Fun #73–107
- Aquaman – More Fun #73–107
- Superboy – More Fun #101–107

== See also ==
- New Comics
