= National Comics Publications =

US comic book company (1946–1961)

National Periodical Publications Inc.
- Formerly: National Comics Publications (1946–1961)
- Type: Subsidiary (1967–1977)
- Industry: Publishing
- Predecessors: National Allied Publications (1935–1936); Nicholson Publishing (1936–1938); Detective Comics (1936–1946); All-American Publications (1939–1946)
- Founded: September 30, 1946; 79 years ago
- Founder: Malcolm Wheeler-Nicholson; Harry Donenfeld; Jack Liebowitz
- Defunct: 1977; 49 years ago
- Fate: Rebranded as DC Comics in 1977
- Successor: DC Comics (1977–present)
- Headquarters: New York City, U.S.
- Products: Comic books
- Parent: Independent (1935–1967); Kinney Services Inc. (1967–1972); Warner Communications (1972–1977)

National Comics Publications (NCP; later known as National Periodical Publications Inc. or simply National) was an American comic book publishing company. It was the direct predecessor of modern-day DC Comics.

== History ==
The corporation was originally two companies: National Allied Publications Inc. (also known as National Allied Newspaper Syndicate Inc. and later Nicholson Publishing Co., Inc.) which was founded by Malcolm Wheeler-Nicholson in 1935 to publish New Fun, (Note: The company debuted in 1935 with the tabloid-sized New Fun: The Big Comic Magazine #1 with a cover date of February 1935; New Fun #1 (Feb. 1935) at the Grand Comics Database. The entry notes that while the logo appears to be simply Fun, the indicia reads, "New FUN is published monthly at 49 West 45th Street, New York, N.Y., by National Allied Publications, Inc.; Malcolm Wheeler-Nicholson, President ... Inquiries concerning advertising should be addressed to the Advertising Manager, New FUN,....") the first American comic book with all-original material rather than comic strip reprints, and Detective Comics Inc., which was founded on December 31, 1936 by Wheeler-Nicholson with Harry Donenfeld and Jack Liebowitz to publish Detective Comics. Wheeler-Nicholson fell into deep debt to Donenfeld and Liebowitz, and in 1938, Donenfeld and Liebowitz petitioned Wheeler-Nicholson's National Allied into bankruptcy and seized it, and as a result, Liebowitz took over and folded National Allied into Detective Comics.

Max Gaines' All-American Publications and Detective Comics Inc. merged to become National Comics Publications Inc. on September 30, 1946. National Comics was renamed "National Periodical Publications Inc." in 1961.

Despite the official names "National Comics" and "National Periodical Publications", the company began branding itself as "Superman-DC" in the early 1940s.

In 1967, National Periodical Publications was purchased by Kinney National Services. In 1977, the company changed its name to DC Comics.

== See also ==
- National Comics Publications, Inc. v. Fawcett Publications, Inc.
