= Hilde Mosse =

German-American psychiatrist (1912–1982)

- Born: 28.01.1912; Berlin, German Empire
- Died: 1982 (aged 68–69)
- Education: University of Basel (M.D.)
- Occupation: Psychiatry

Hilde L. Mosse (28. January 1912 – 1982) was a German-American psychiatrist. The sister of famed historian of Nazism George Mosse, she, along with fellow psychiatrist Fredric Wertham, helped to form the Lafargue Clinic in Harlem, New York. She shared Wertham's view that comic books were pathological influences on children, though was nowhere near as public a figure as her colleague.

== Early years ==
Mosse was born in 1912 into a wealthy Jewish family in Berlin, and was the granddaughter of publisher and philanthropist Rudolf Mosse. She attended medical school at the University of Basel, and emigrated to the United States in 1939.

== Work in Harlem ==
In 1946, Mosse helped to found the Lafargue Clinic, a progressive, low-cost mental hospital for residents of Harlem. She, along with Fredric Wertham, were the clinic's two main doctors. Mosse would volunteer there until the clinic's closure in 1959.
