= Joe Shuster =

Comic book artist (1914–1992)

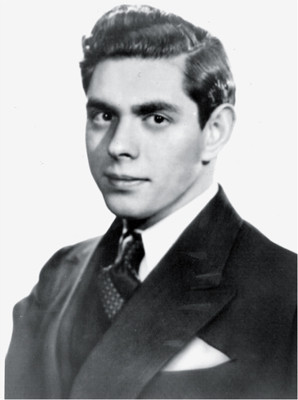
- Shuster in 1939
- Born: Joseph Shuster; July 10, 1914 Toronto, Ontario, Canada
- Died: July 30, 1992 (aged 78) Los Angeles, California, U.S.
- Areas: Penciller, Artist
- Pseudonym: Reuths
- Notable works: Superman, Action Comics #1
- Awards: Inkpot Award (1975); Will Eisner Award Hall of Fame, 1992; Jack Kirby Hall of Fame, 1993; Joe Shuster Canadian Comic Book Creator Hall of Fame, 2005
- Relatives: Frank Shuster (cousin)

Signature
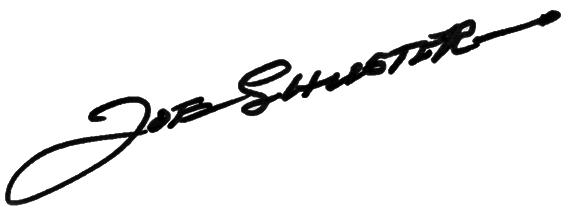

Joseph Shuster (/ˈʃuːstər/ SHOO-stər; July 10, 1914 – July 30, 1992) was a Canadian-American comic book artist best known for co-creating the DC Comics character Superman, with Jerry Siegel, in Action Comics #1 (cover-dated June 1938).

Shuster was involved in a number of legal battles over ownership of the Superman character. His comic book career after Superman was relatively unsuccessful, and by the mid-1970s, Shuster had left the field completely due to partial blindness.

He and Siegel were inducted into both the comic book industry's Will Eisner Comic Book Hall of Fame in 1992 and the Jack Kirby Hall of Fame in 1993. In 2005, the Canadian Comic Book Creator Awards Association instituted the Joe Shuster Awards, named to honor the Canada-born artist.

== Early life and career ==
Joseph Shuster was born in Toronto, Ontario, to a Jewish family. His father, Julius Shuster (originally Shusterowich), an immigrant from Rotterdam, had a tailor shop in Toronto's garment district. His mother, Ida (Katharske), had come from Kiev, Russian Empire (now Kyiv, Ukraine). His family, including his sister, Jean, lived on Bathurst, Oxford, and Borden Streets. In 1922 Julius Shuster was listed as living at 48 Major Street, and in 1923 and 1924 at 101 Oxford Street. Joe attended Ryerson and Lansdowne Public Schools (now Ryerson Community School and Lord Lansdowne Junior Public School with the Toronto District School Board). One of his cousins was comedian Frank Shuster of the Canadian comedy team Wayne and Shuster. He also had a brother named Frank.

As a youngster, Shuster worked as a newspaper boy for the Toronto Daily Star. The family barely made ends meet, and the budding young artist would scrounge for paper, which the family could not afford. He recalled in 1992,

I would go from store to store in Toronto and pick up whatever they threw out. One day, I was lucky enough to find a bunch of wallpaper rolls that were unused and left over from some job. The backs were blank, naturally. So it was a goldmine for me, and I went home with every roll I could carry. I kept using that wallpaper for a long time.

Sometime in 1924, when Shuster was 9 or 10, his family moved to Cleveland, Ohio. There Shuster attended Glenville High School and befriended his later collaborator, writer Jerry Siegel, with whom he began publishing a science fiction fanzine called Science Fiction: The Advance Guard of Future Civilization. Siegel described his friendship with the similarly shy and bespectacled Shuster: "When Joe and I first met, it was like the right chemicals coming together."

The duo broke into comics at Major Malcolm Wheeler-Nicholson's National Allied Publications, the future DC Comics, working on the landmark New Fun—the first comic-book series to consist solely of original material rather than using any reprinted newspaper comic strips—debuting with the musketeer swashbuckler "Henri Duval" and the occult detective Doctor Occult, both in New Fun #6 (Oct. 1935). In a 1992 interview, in which he used the fledgling publisher's future name, he said the two sample strips were not the ones eventually published:

One was drawn on brown wrapping paper and the other was drawn on the back of wallpaper from Toronto. And DC approved them, just like that! It's incredible! But DC did say, 'We like your ideas, we like your scripts and we like your drawings. But please, copy over the stories in pen and ink on good paper.' So I got my mother and father to lend me the money to go out and buy some decent paper, the first drawing paper I ever had, in order to submit these stories properly to DC Comics.

== Creation of Superman ==
Siegel and Shuster created a bald telepathic villain, bent on dominating the world, as the title character in the short story "The Reign of the Superman", published in Siegel's 1932 fanzine Science Fiction: The Advance Guard of Future Civilization #3. The story was not successful, and the character was not used again.

The following year, Siegel re-used the name The Superman to develop a new character who became one of the most famous superheroes of all time. Shuster modelled the hero on Douglas Fairbanks Sr., and modelled his bespectacled alter ego, Clark Kent, on a combination of Harold Lloyd and Shuster himself, with the name "Clark Kent" derived from movie stars Clark Gable and Kent Taylor. Lois Lane was modeled on Joanne Carter, a model hired by Shuster. (She later married co-creator Jerry Siegel in 1948.) Siegel and Shuster's origins as children of Jewish immigrants are also thought to have influenced their work, although neither Siegel nor Shuster said so. Timothy Aaron Pevey argued that they crafted "an immigrant figure whose desire was to fit into American culture as an American", something which Pevey feels taps into an important aspect of American identity.

Siegel and Shuster then began a four-year quest to find a publisher. Titling the character The Superman, Siegel and Shuster offered it to Consolidated Book Publishing, who had published a 48-page black-and-white comic book entitled Detective Dan: Secret Operative #48. Siegel and Shuster each compared this character to Slam Bradley, an adventurer the pair had created for Detective Comics #1 (March 1937). Although the duo received an encouraging letter, Consolidated never again published comic books. Shuster was distraught over the rejection, and, by varying accounts, either burned every page of the story, with the cover surviving only because Siegel saved it from the fire, or he tore the story to shreds, with only two cover sketches remaining.

In 1938, the proposal was languishing among others at More Fun Comics, published by National Allied Publications, the primary precursor of DC Comics. Editor Vin Sullivan chose it as the cover feature for National's Action Comics #1 (June 1938). The following year, Siegel & Shuster initiated the syndicated Superman comic strip.

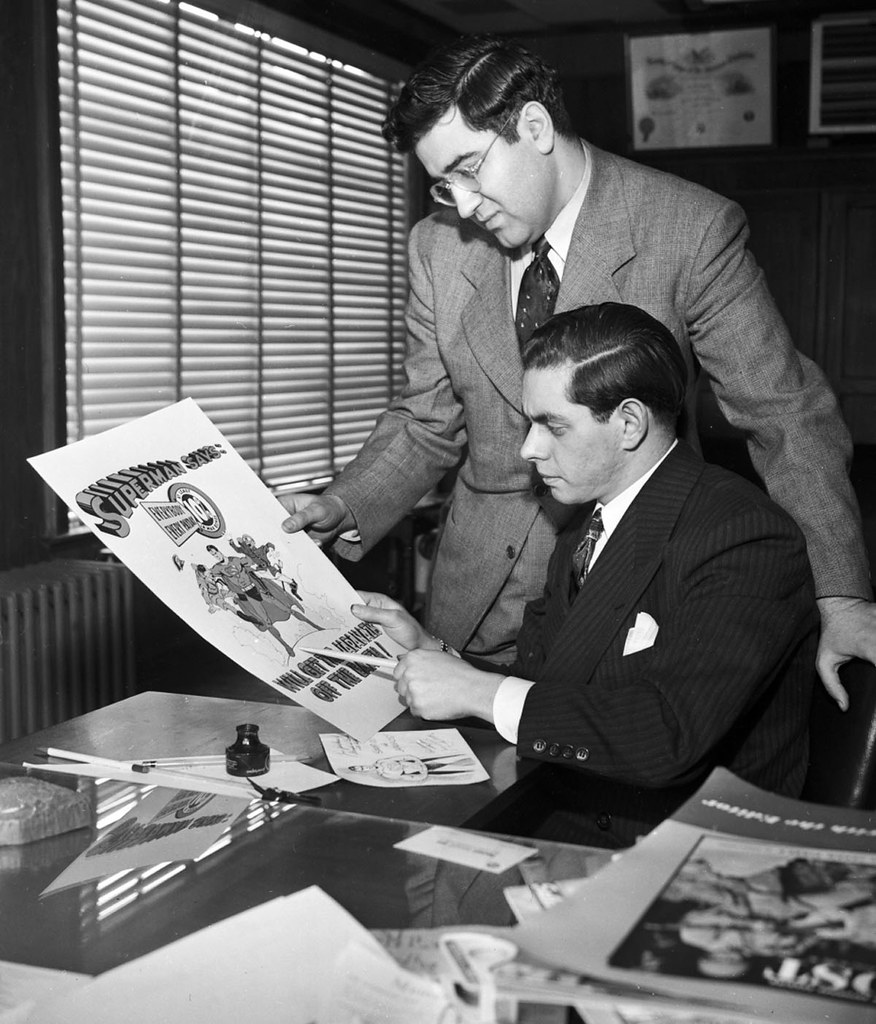
Shuster (seated) with Jerry Siegel in 1942

When Superman first appeared, Superman's alter ego Clark Kent worked for the Daily Star newspaper, named by Shuster after the Toronto Daily Star, his old employer in Toronto. When the comic strip received international distribution, the company permanently changed the name to the Daily Planet. Shuster said he modeled the cityscape of Superman's home city, Metropolis, on that of his old hometown.

As part of the deal which saw Superman published in Action Comics, Siegel and Shuster sold the rights to the character in return for $130 and a contract to supply the publisher with material.

Due to financial difficulties, Wheeler-Nicholson had formed a corporation with Harry Donenfeld and Jack Liebowitz called Detective Comics, Inc. It was under the DC label that Action Comics #1 (cover-dated June 1938) was published. A series of mergers and name changes resulted in the publisher becoming National Periodical Publications, and then, in 1977, DC Comics (which had been its nickname since 1940).

=== Legal issues ===
In 1946, near the end of their ten-year contract to produce Superman stories, Siegel and Shuster sued Detective Comics, Inc. to have their contract annulled and regain their rights to Superman. The following year, the New York State Supreme Court ruled the publisher had validly purchased the rights to Superman when it bought the first Superman story, saying the duo had "transferred to Detective Comics, Inc., all of their rights in and to the comic strip Superman, including the title, names, characters and conception...."

A subsequent interlocutory judgment found that rights to Superboy, however, belonged to Siegel. Detective Comics Inc. subsequently paid Siegel and Shuster $94,000 for the rights to Superboy and the duo's written agreement acknowledging the rights to Superman belonged to the publisher.

Afterward, the company removed Shuster and Siegel's byline from Superman stories.

== Later career ==
In 1947, the team rejoined editor Sullivan, by then the founder and publisher of the comic-book company Magazine Enterprises where they created the short-lived comical crime-fighter Funnyman. Shuster continued to draw comics after the failure of Funnyman, although exactly what he drew is uncertain. Comic historian Ted White wrote that Shuster continued to draw horror stories into the 1950s.

Shuster was also the anonymous illustrator for Nights of Horror, an underground sadomasochistic fetish paperback book series. In 1954, Nights of Horror garnered controversy because of its involvement in the trial of the Brooklyn Thrill Killers, where it was alleged by psychiatric expert and anti-comics crusader Fredric Wertham that the gang's leader had read the books and that they were responsible for his crimes. The Nights of Horror series was seized and banned in the State of New York, and the case eventually went to the Supreme Court. However, the books' artist was never identified at the time. In 2004, Gerard Jones revealed that Shuster had drawn the books. The claim was backed in 2009 by comics historian Craig Yoe. This was based on character similarities, and comparison of the artistic style between the illustrations and those of the cast of the Superman comics.

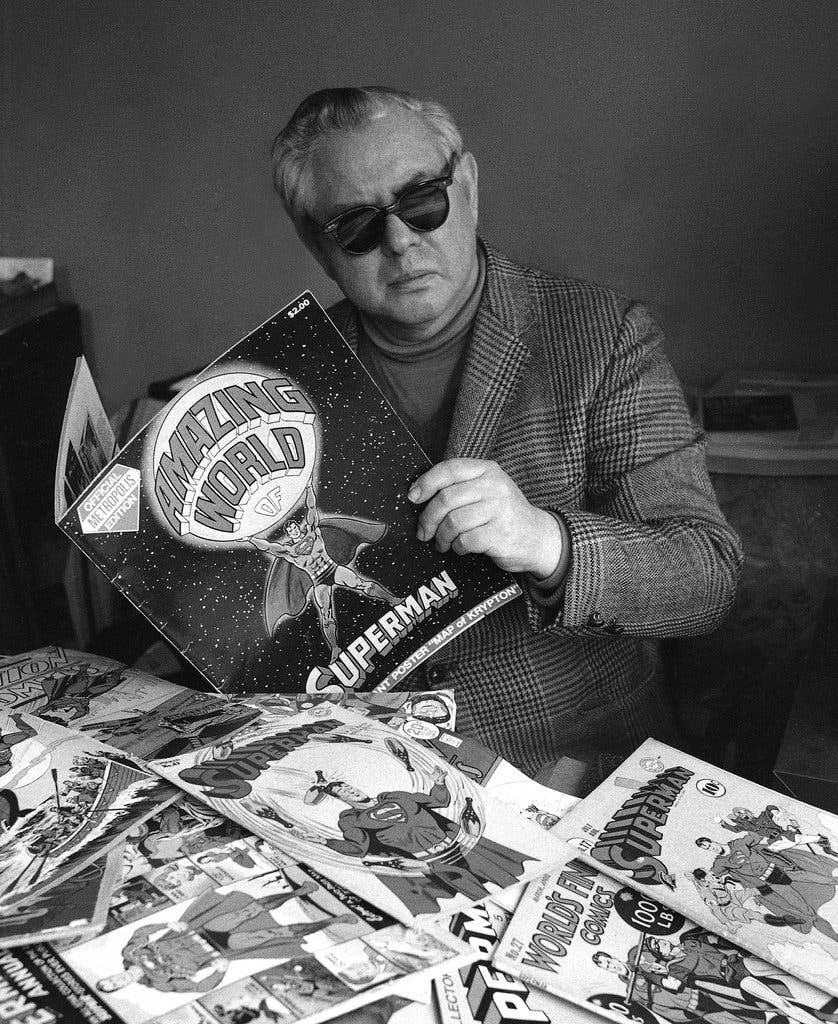
Shuster in a DC Comics press photo, 1975

In 1964, when Shuster was living on Long Island with his elderly mother, he was reported to be earning his living as a freelance cartoonist; he was also "trying to paint pop art—serious comic strips—and hope[d] eventually to promote a one-man show in some chic Manhattan gallery". At one point, his worsening eyesight prevented him from drawing, and he worked as a deliveryman in order to earn a living. Jerry Robinson claimed Shuster had delivered a package to the DC building, embarrassing the employees. He was summoned to the CEO, given one hundred dollars, and told to buy a new coat and find another job.

In 1967, when the Superman copyright came up for renewal, Siegel launched a second lawsuit, which also proved unsuccessful.

In 1975, Siegel launched a publicity campaign, in which Shuster participated, protesting DC Comics' treatment of him and Shuster. The Association of American Editorial Cartoonists' president, Jerry Robinson, was involved in the campaign along with comic-book artist Neal Adams. By 1976, Shuster was almost blind and living in a California nursing home. Due to a great deal of negative publicity over their handling of the affair, and the upcoming Superman movie, DC's parent company Warner Communications reinstated the byline dropped more than thirty years earlier and granted the pair a lifetime pension of $20,000 a year, later increased to $30,000, plus health benefits. The first issue with the restored credit was Superman #302 (Aug. 1976).

Although Shuster was now supported by a lifetime stipend from DC Comics, he fell into debt—close to $20,000 by the time of his death. After he died, DC Comics agreed to pay off his unpaid debts in exchange for an agreement from his heirs to not challenge ownership of Superman.

== Death ==
Shuster died on July 30, 1992, at his West Los Angeles home of congestive heart failure and hypertension. He was 78.

== Awards and honors ==
- In 1985, DC Comics named Shuster as one of the honorees in the company's 50th anniversary publication Fifty Who Made DC Great.
- In 1991 Shuster was the subject of a Heritage Minute short film Superman about the creation of the comic book hero.
- In 1992, Shuster was inducted into the Will Eisner Award Hall of Fame.
- In 2005, Shuster was inducted into the Joe Shuster Canadian Comic Book Creator Hall of Fame for his contributions to comic books.
- The Joe Shuster Awards, started in 2005, were named in honor of the Canadian-born Shuster, and honor achievements in the field of comic book publishing by Canadian creators, publishers and retailers.
- In Toronto, where Shuster was born, the street Joe Shuster Way is named in his honor.
- On September 10, 2013, Gary Dumm and Laura Dumm's "A Love Letter to Cleveland" murals were unveiled on the Orange Blossom Press building near the Cleveland West Side Market, which includes an homage to Siegel and Shuster.
- Amor Avenue in Cleveland's Glenville neighborhood was renamed "Joe Shuster Lane".

== Bibliography ==
=== Charlton Comics ===
- Crime and Justice #19–21 (1954)
- Hot Rods and Racing Cars #20 (1955)
- Space Adventures #11–13 (1954)
- Strange Suspense Stories #19, 21–22 (1954)
- This Magazine is Haunted #18–20 (1954)

=== DC Comics ===
- Action Comics #1–24 (1938–1940)
- Adventure Comics #32–41, 103–109 (1938–1946)
- Detective Comics #1–32 (1937–1939)
- More Fun Comics (diverse stories): #10–48; (Superboy): #101–105, 107 (1936–1946)
- New Comics (then, New Adventure Comics) #2–31 (1936–1938)
- New York's World Fair #1–2 (1939)
- Superman #1–4 (1939–1940)

== See also ==
- Boys of Steel, a picture book biography of Siegel and Shuster by Marc Tyler Nobleman and Ross MacDonald
- The Joe Shuster Story: The Artist Behind Superman, a nonfiction graphic novel by Julian Voloj and Thomas Campi
- Copyright lawsuits by Superman's creators
