= Marc Toberoff =

Intellectual property attorney

- Education: McGill University (BA); Columbia University (JD)
- Occupations: Lawyer; Producer
- Website: https://toberoffandassociates.com/

Marc Toberoff is an American attorney and producer. He specializes in copyright and entertainment litigation.

== Early life and education ==
Marc Toberoff attended McGill University before earning a J.D. from Columbia Law School in 1980. Soon after graduating from Columbia Law School, Toberoff worked as what he referred to as a “glorified gofer” for director Robert Altman.

== Career ==
Toberoff has represented writers and other creators in numerous high-profile disputes and has been recognized by Forbes Magazine, The Hollywood Reporter, Variety, and the Los Angeles Business Journal as among the most influential intellectual property attorneys in the entertainment industry.

=== Notable cases ===
==== Moonrunners L.P. v. Time Warner Inc. ====
In 2005, Toberoff secured a preliminary injunction against the Warner Bros. Pictures release of its The Dukes of Hazzard movie on behalf of the owners of the indie film Moonrunners, from which The Dukes of Hazzard television series was derived.

==== Clonus Associates v. Dreamworks, LLC ====
Toberoff represented Robert Fiveson, producer and director of the indie film Parts: The Clonus Horror, in a copyright infringement action against DreamWorks for its 2005 blockbuster film The Island. The district court denied the studio's motion for summary judgment, writing in its decision that “the jury will have to decide whether the similarities are qualitatively substantial, and therefore actionable.” The parties settled shortly thereafter on confidential terms and dismissed the case pursuant to a joint stipulation.

==== Classic Media, Inc. v. Mewborn ====
In 2008, Toberoff persuaded the Ninth Circuit to affirm the copyrights of the daughter of Eric Knight in his novel Lassie Come-Home. The decision, Classic Media, Inc. v. Mewborn, 532 F.3d 978 (9th Cir. 2008), has helped shape authors' rights under the Copyright Act.

==== Horror v. Miller ====
In Horror Inc. v. Miller, 335 F. Supp. 3d 273 (D. Conn. 2018), aff’d, 15 F.4th 232 (2d Cir. 2022), Toberoff represented Victor Miller, the screenwriter of Friday the 13th, in a case that resulted in Miller regaining the copyright to his script through the Copyright Act's termination provisions. Miller secured a favorable ruling in the District Court of Connecticut, which, in a published opinion, upheld Miller's Notices of Termination under Section 203(a) of Copyright Act and the recovery of Miller's original Friday the 13th copyright. The District Court's decision was later affirmed by the Second Circuit. On remand, the District Court entered an order awarding nearly $887,000 in attorney fees to Miller.

==== Zindel v. Fox Searchlight Pictures, Inc. ====
Toberoff represented the son and trustee of Pulitzer-Prize-winning playwright Paul Zindel in a copyright infringement suit regarding his father's play, Let Me Hear You Whisper and Fox's The Shape of Water. The Ninth Circuit, in its decision, Zindel as Trustee for David Zindel Trust v. Fox Searchlight Pictures, Inc., 815 Fed. Appx 158 (9th Cir. 2020), found in favor of the plaintiff, writing “at this stage, reasonable minds could differ on whether there is substantial similarity between Let Me Hear You Whisper and The Shape of Water.” The Ninth Circuit later refused the defendants' petition to reconsider the decision in banc. Shortly afterwards, the parties settled on confidential terms and stipulated to dismissal of the case.

==== In Re Estate of James Brown ====
Toberoff represented nine of James Brown's heirs in a dispute regarding the rights to Brown's estate and music copyrights. In June 2020, the South Carolina Supreme Court rendered a unanimous decision in favor of Toberoff's clients, and found that Brown's "widow" was not his lawful spouse. As a result, the alleged widow was found to have no right to his multi-million dollar estate.

==== Twentieth Century Fox Film Corp. v. Thomas ====
In 2021, Toberoff filed a complaint in federal court on behalf of brothers John C. Thomas and James E. Thomas, the screenwriters behind the action blockbuster Predator (1987), to reclaim the rights to their script. Shortly thereafter, Twentieth Century Fox counter-sued the Thomas brothers. The case was settled on confidential terms and a stipulated dismissal was entered in 2022.

==== Columbia Pictures Industries, Inc. v. Gallo ====
On June 23, 2023, Columbia Pictures sued George Gallo and Robert Israel, the authors of Bulletproof Hearts, which was developed into the 1995 action hit Bad Boys (1995), seeking to retain the film rights to the work. The case settled on confidential terms in 2024.

==== Hill v. Metro-Goldwyn-Mayer Studios Inc. ====
On February 2, 2024, Toberoff filed a copyright lawsuit on behalf of Canadian author and screenwriter, R. Lance Hill against Amazon Studios LLC, Metro-Goldwyn-Mayer Studios Inc., and United Artists Pictures Inc. The complaint alleges that the defendants ignored Hill's right, under the Copyright Act, to reclaim the rights for his 1986 “spec” screenplay, “Roadhouse,” which spawned the cult-classic, Road House (1989), starring Patrick Swayze, when it proceeded with the production and release of the 2024 remake of the film, Road House (2024). The complaint also made headlines in its claim that the defendants used Artificial Intelligence to replicate actors' voices without permission during the SAG-AFTRA strike in order to complete the film prior to the termination date for Hill's copyright. The lawsuit is currently pending before the Central District of California.

==== Ray Charles Foundation v. Robinson ====
In the music industry, Toberoff represented the children of Ray Charles. On their behalf, Toberoff prevailed in a suit in the Central District of California regarding the copyrights to fifty-one of his songs, including many of his most famous compositions (e.g., I Got A Woman, It's All Right, Hallelujah I Love Her So). The decision was later reversed in part on procedural grounds and remanded by the Ninth Circuit for further proceedings. After further litigation at the trial court level, the case settled on confidential terms and was voluntarily dismissed with prejudice.

==== Marvel litigation ====
===== Marvel Characters, Inc. v. Kirby =====
Toberoff represented the estate of comic book artist and creator Jack Kirby in litigation with Marvel Entertainment regarding the copyrights to Kirby's co-creations, including Fantastic Four, X-Men, Incredible Hulk, Mighty Thor and Silver Surfer. The parties settled on September 26, 2014 while a petition for certiorari to the U.S. Supreme Court was still pending, with Marvel releasing a statement declaring, “Marvel and the family of Jack Kirby have amicably resolved their legal disputes and are looking forward to advancing their shared goal of honoring Mr. Kirby's significant role in Marvel's history.”

===== Marvel Characters, Inc. v. Lieber, Solo, Michele Hart-Rico =====
Toberoff represented the rights and interests under the Copyright Act of leading comic-book creators Steve Ditko, Larry Lieber, Gene Colan, Don Heck, and Don Rico, to some of Marvel's most iconic superheroes, including Spider-Man, Iron Man, Thor, Doctor Strange, Ant-Man, Captain Marvel, Blade and Black Widow. After significant litigation in 2021–2023, the five cases settled on confidential terms.

==== Superman litigation ====
He represented the heirs of Superman creators Jerry Siegel and Joe Shuster in an unsuccessful effort to reclaim the rights to Superman from Warner Bros. and DC Comics.
