= Seduction of the Innocent =

1954 book by psychiatrist Fredric Wertham

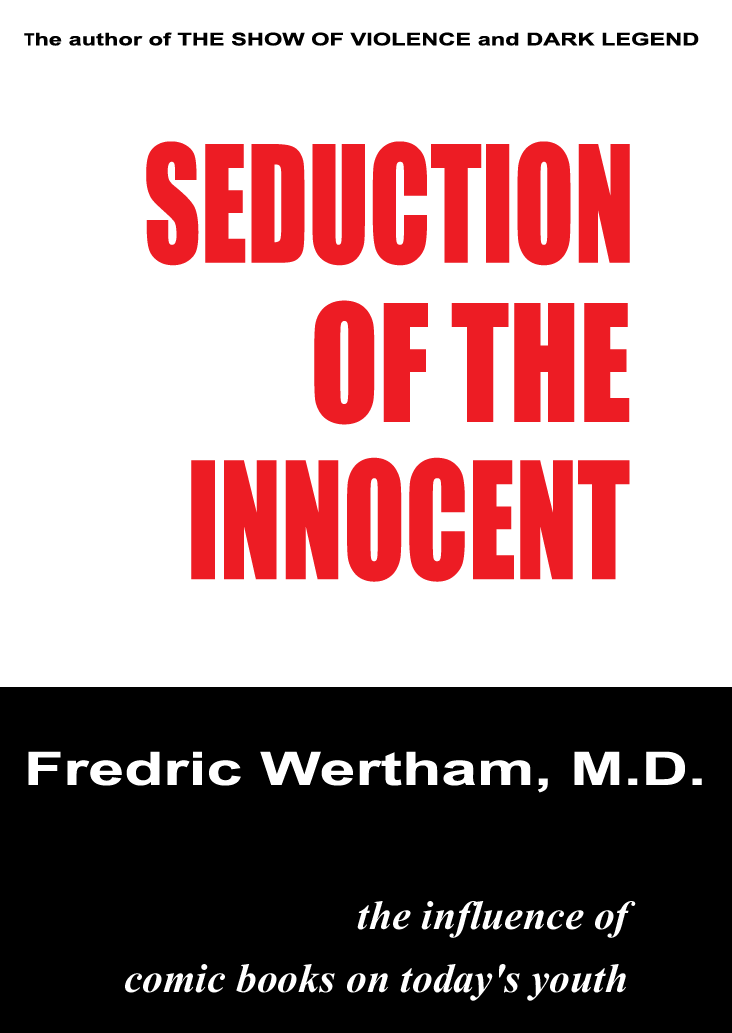
- Reproduction of first edition cover
- Author: Fredric Wertham
- Language: English
- Subject: Comic books
- Publisher: Rinehart & Company
- Publication date: April 19, 1954
- Publication place: United States
- Pages: 397
- OCLC: 9593548

Seduction of the Innocent is a book by German-born American psychiatrist Fredric Wertham, published in 1954, that warned that comic books were a harmful form of popular literature and a serious cause of juvenile delinquency. The book was taken seriously at the time in the United States, and was a minor bestseller that alarmed American parents and galvanized them to campaign for censorship. At the same time, a U.S. Congressional inquiry was launched into the comic book industry. Subsequent to the publication of Seduction of the Innocent, the Comics Code Authority was established by publishers to self-censor their titles. In the decades since the book's publication, Wertham's research has been disputed by scholars.

== Overview and arguments ==
Seduction of the Innocent cited overt or covert depictions of violence, sex, drug use, and other adult fare within "crime comics" – a term Wertham used to describe not only the popular gangster/murder-oriented titles of the time, but superhero and horror comics as well. The book asserted that reading this material encouraged similar behavior in children.

Comics, especially the crime/horror titles pioneered by EC Comics, were not lacking in gruesome images; Wertham reproduced these extensively, pointing out what he saw as recurring morbid themes such as "injury to the eye". Many of his other conjectures, particularly about hidden sexual themes (e.g. images of female nudity concealed in drawings or Batman and Robin as gay partners), were met with derision within the comics industry. Wertham's claim that Wonder Woman had a bondage subtext was somewhat better documented, as the creator William Moulton Marston had admitted as much; however, Wertham also claimed Wonder Woman's strength and independence made the character a lesbian. At this time homosexuality was still viewed as a mental disorder by the Diagnostic and Statistical Manual of Mental Disorders. Wertham also claimed that Superman was both un-American and fascistic.

Wertham critiqued the commercial environment of comic book publishing and retailing, objecting to air rifles and knives advertised alongside violent stories. Wertham sympathized with retailers who did not want to sell horror comics, yet were compelled to by their distributors' table d'hôte product line policies.

Seduction of the Innocent was illustrated with comic-book panels offered as evidence, each accompanied by a line of Wertham's commentary. The first printing contained a bibliography listing the comic book publishers cited, but fears of lawsuits compelled the publisher to tear the bibliography page from any copies available, so copies with an intact bibliography are rare. Early complete editions of Seduction of the Innocent are collected avidly by book and comic book collectors.

Beginning in 1948, Wertham wrote and spoke widely, arguing about the detrimental effects that comics reading had on young people. Consequently, Seduction of the Innocent serves as a culminating expression of his sentiments about comics and presents augmented examples and arguments, rather than wholly new material. Wertham's concerns were not limited to comics' impact on boys: He also expressed a concern for the effect of impossibly proportioned female characters on girl readers. Writer A. David Lewis claims that Wertham's anxiety over the perceived homosexual subtext of Batman and Robin was aimed at the depiction of family within this context, rather than focused on the moral character of homosexuality itself. Will Brooker also writes in Batman Unmasked: Analyzing a Cultural Icon that Wertham's notorious reading of Batman and Robin as a homosexual couple was not of his own invention, but was suggested to him by homosexual males whom he interviewed.

== Influence ==
Seduction of the Innocent caught the attention of US Senator Estes Kefauver. Kefauver had a reputation as a mob hunter, and it was known that the mob had strong connections with the distribution of comics and magazines. He saw Wertham's agenda as a tool he could use against the organized crime within the industry. As a platform from where he could spread his message more efficiently, Wertham appeared before the Senate Subcommittee on Juvenile Delinquency. In testimony before the committee, he compared the comic book industry to Adolf Hitler.

The hearing was broadcast on television, which was quickly becoming a new mass medium, and made other media join in. It made headlines on the front page of The New York Times. Even if the government did not act beyond the hearing, and Kefauver lost interest in comics after he was selected as a presidential candidate, the public damage was already done. The hearing was in April, and the same summer 15 publishers went out of business. At EC Comics, Mad was the only surviving title.

The committee's questioning of their next witness, EC publisher William Gaines, focused on violent scenes of the type Wertham had described.

At the time, Wertham was also the Court's appointed psychiatric expert during the trial of the Brooklyn Thrill Killers, a gang of youths who had brutalized people and killed two men during the summer of 1954. Wertham asserted that the gang leader's behaviour had been caused by comic books, and most specifically pornographic ones. The case helped fuel the public outrage against comic books. Nights of Horror, an underground fetish series that Wertham had used as evidence during the trial, was banned by the State of New York: the case against that comic eventually went to the Supreme Court, which upheld the ban in 1957.

Although the Senate Subcommittee on Juvenile Delinquency's final report did not blame comics for crime, it recommended that the comics industry tone down its content voluntarily. Publishers then developed the self-censorship body the Comics Code Authority.

== Criticism ==
According to a 2012 study by Carol L. Tilley, Wertham "manipulated, overstated, compromised, and fabricated evidence" in support of the contentions expressed in Seduction of the Innocent. He misprojected both the sample size and substance of his research, making it out to be more objective and less anecdotal than it truly was. He generally did not adhere to standards worthy of scientific research, instead using questionable evidence for his argument that comics were a cultural failure.

Wertham used New York City adolescents from troubled backgrounds with previous evidence of behavior disorders as his primary sample population. For instance, he used children at the Lafargue Clinic to argue that comics disturbed young people, but according to a staff member's calculation seventy percent of children under the age of sixteen at the clinic had diagnoses of behavior problems. He also used children with more severe psychiatric disorders which required hospitalization at Bellevue Hospital Center, Kings County Hospital Center, or Queens General Hospital.

Statements from Wertham's subjects were sometimes altered, combined, or excerpted so as to be misleading. Relevant personal experience was sometimes left unmentioned. For instance, in arguing that the Batman comics condoned homosexuality because of the relationship between Batman and his sidekick Robin, there is evidence Wertham combined two subjects' statements into one, and did not mention the two subjects had been in a homosexual relationship for years prior. He failed to inform readers that a subject had been recently sodomized. Despite subjects specifically noting a preference for or the superior relevance of other comics, he gave greater weight to their reading Batman. Wertham also presented as firsthand stories that he could have only heard through colleagues.

His descriptions of comic content were sometimes misleading, either by exaggeration or elision. He mentions a "headless man" in an issue of Captain Marvel while the comic only shows Captain Marvel's face splashed with an invisibility potion, not a decapitated figure. He exaggerated a 13-year-old girl's report of stealing in a comic from "sometimes" to "often".

== In other countries ==
While it had been the US comic industry itself that imposed self-censorship in the form of the Comics Code Authority, France had already passed the Loi du 16 juillet 1949 sur les publications destinées à la jeunesse (Law of July 16, 1949 on Publications Aimed at Youth) in response to the post-liberation influx of American comics. As late as 1969, the law was invoked to prohibit the comic magazine Fantask —which featured translated versions of Marvel Comics stories — after seven issues. The government agency charged with upholding the law, particularly in the 1950s and the first half of the 1960s, was called the Commission de surveillance et de contrôle des publications destinées à l'enfance et à l'adolescence (Committee in Charge of Surveillance and Control over Publications Aimed at Children and Adolescents). After the May 1968 social upheaval in France, key comics artists, including Jean Giraud, staged a revolt in the editorial offices of the comic magazine Pilote, demanding and ultimately receiving more creative freedom from editor-in-chief René Goscinny.

West Germany from 1954 had the Bundesprüfstelle für jugendgefährdende Medien (Federal Department for Media Harmful to Young Persons), a government agency intended to weed out publications, including comics, considered unhealthy for German youth. This agency came about because of the "Gesetz über die Verbreitung jugendgefährdender Schriften" law passed on June 9, 1953, itself resulting from the "provisions for the protection of young persons" clause in Article 5 of the German constitution, regulating freedom of expression. The German comics industry in 1955 instituted the Freiwillige Selbstkontrolle für Serienbilder (Voluntary Self-Control for Comics).

Dutch Minister of Education Theo Rutten of the Catholic People's Party published a letter in the October 25, 1948, issue of the newspaper Het Parool directly addressing educational institutions and local government bodies, advocating the prohibition of comics. He stated, "These booklets, which contain a series of illustrations with accompanying text, are generally sensational in character, without any other value. It is not possible to act against the printers, publishers or distributors of these novels, nor can anything be achieved by not making paper available to them, as the necessary paper is available on the free market". Exceptions were made for a small number of "healthy" comic productions from the Toonder studio, which included the literary comic strip Tom Poes.

== In popular culture ==
Comics publisher Dynamite Entertainment (The Lone Ranger, The Shadow, Conan) would adopt the title for a series of crime comics, beginning in 2015.

Max Allan Collins crime novel, Seduction of the Innocent (June 2013), the third book in his Jack & Maggie Starr series, is a murder mystery set around a fictionalized version of Fredric Wertham's crusade against comic books.

== See also ==
- Homosexuality in the Batman franchise
- Moral panic
- How to Read Donald Duck
