= Copyright lawsuits by Superman's creators =

In 1938, Jerry Siegel and Joe Shuster gave away the copyright to Superman to Detective Comics, Inc., the predecessor of DC Comics. In 1948, National Comics (another predecessor) settled ownership and royalties disputes and paid $94,013.16 for Superman and Superboy rights. In 1969, a court ruled that Siegel and Shuster's grant of copyright included their renewal rights. Shuster died in 1992 and his heirs re-granted their rights for a $25,000 annual stipend. In 2001, the Siegel heirs took back their rights using the termination provision of the Copyright Act of 1976 and accepted a new purchase offer from Warner.

Later in 2001, the heirs tried to reclaim their rights after Marc Toberoff made a better offer. The Central District court of California ruled in 2008 that the Siegel heirs can cancel the Warner purchase, but this was overturned in 2012 on appeal to the 9th circuit. Thus, DC Comics currently holds the copyright to Superman.

== Background ==
=== DC Comics corporate history ===
National Allied Publications was founded in 1934 by Malcolm Wheeler-Nicholson. Due to financial difficulties, Wheeler-Nicholson formed a corporation with Harry Donenfeld and Jack Liebowitz called Detective Comics, Inc. In January 1938, Wheeler-Nicholson sold his stake in National Allied Publications and Detective Comics to Donenfeld and Liebowitz as part of a bankruptcy settlement. On September 30, 1946, these two companies merged to become National Comics Publications. On June 29, 1961, the company became known as National Periodical Publications. In 1967 National Periodical Publications was purchased by Kinney National Company, which later purchased Warner Bros.-Seven Arts and became Warner Communications. In 1976, National Periodical Publications changed its name to DC Comics. Since 1940, the publisher had placed a logo with the initials "DC" (as in "Detective Comics") on all its magazine covers, and consequently "DC Comics" became an informal name for the publisher.

=== Estate of Jerome Siegel ===
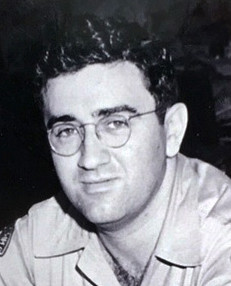
Jerry Siegel, writer

- Jerome Siegel (Oct 17, 1914 – Jan 28, 1996) — Writer, co-creator of Superman
- Michael Siegel (Jan 27, 1944 – Jan 17, 2006) — Son of Jerome and Bella Siegel (Jerome's first wife, m. 1939 and div. Oct 1948). Not to be confused with the father of Jerome, also named Michael.
- Joanne Siegel (Dec 1, 1917 – Feb 12, 2011) — Jerome's second wife (m. Oct 13, 1948).
- Laura Siegel Larson (born Mar 1, 1951) — Daughter of Jerome and Joanne Siegel.

=== Estate of Joseph Shuster ===
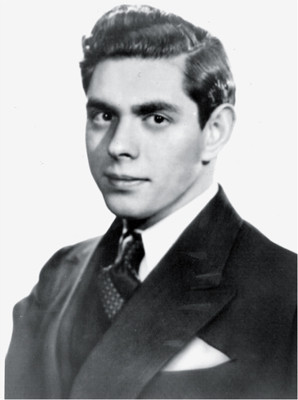
Joe Shuster, illustrator

- Joseph Shuster (July 10, 1914 – July 30, 1992) — Illustrator, co-creator of Superman.
- Jean Adele Peavy (born Feb 1, 1921) — Sister of Joseph Shuster, mother of Mark Warren Peary and Dawn Peavy.
- Mark Warren Peary (born Jan 14, 1962) — Nephew of Joseph Shuster, son of Jean Peavy. He changed his surname from "Peavy" to "Peary".
- Dawn Peavy — Niece of Joseph Shuster, daughter of Jean Peavy.
- Frank Shuster (April 29, 1918 – Nov 7, 1996) — Brother of Joseph Shuster. Not to be confused with Frank Shuster (died 2002), cousin to Joseph Shuster and professional comedian.

=== Siegel and Shuster's employment at DC Comics (1935–1947) ===
In 1933, writer Jerry Siegel and artist Joe Shuster conceived the fictional comic strip character Superman. For the next five years, they tried selling Superman to various newspaper syndicates, with no success.

In 1935, Siegel and Shuster began working for New York comic magazine publisher National Allied Publications, producing detective and adventure stories. They refused, however, to sell Superman, their prize creation, to National Allied because it was a poorly managed business.

On December 4, 1937, Siegel and Shuster signed an employment contract with Detective Comics, Inc. (an affiliate of National Allied Publications) that gave Detective Comics, Inc. the right of first refusal over any comic material they produced for the next two years, and stipulated a pay rate of $10 per page.

The Employer hereby agrees to employ, and does hereby employ the Employees as Artists, for a period of two years, commencing with December 4, 1937 and terminating December 3, 1939, and pay them for such services and for all of the matters hereinafter set forth, the sum of Ten Dollars ($10) per page. [...] It is understood that any new and additional features which the Employees produce for use in a comic magazine are to be first submitted to the Employer, who reserves the right to accept or reject same within a period of Sixty days.

In January 1938, Detective Comics, Inc. offered to publish Superman. Siegel and Shuster by now had given up on the newspapers and agreed to sell Superman to Detective Comics, Inc. They produced 13 pages of comic stories, which they submitted to Detective Comics, Inc. in late February. In March, they signed a contract in which they released the copyright for Superman to Detective Comics, Inc. The contract for the sale, signed in March 1938, read:

Dated March 1

I, the undersigned, am an artist or author and have performed work for strip entitled SUPERMAN

In consideration of $130.00 agreed to be paid me by you, I hereby sell and transfer such work and strip, all good will attached thereto and exclusive right to the use of the characters and story, continuity and title of strip contained therein, to you and your assigns to have and hold forever and to be your exclusive property and I agree not to employ said characters by their names contained therein or under any other names at any time hereafter to any other person firm or corporation, or permit the use thereof by said other parties without obtaining your written consent therefor. The intent hereof is to give you exclusive right to use and acknowledge that you own said characters or story and the use thereof, exclusively. I have received the above sum of money.

Sgd. Joe Shuster
Sgd. Jerome Siegel

Returned by mail on March 3, 1938

Superman was published on April 18, 1938, in Action Comics #1, and was an immediate and great success. Siegel and Shuster now regretted selling the copyright for so little. Nevertheless, DC Comics retained Siegel and Shuster because they were popular with the readers. From 1938 to 1947 they were together paid over $400,000 (AFI $7,550,000).

On September 22, 1938, Siegel and Shuster signed a 10-year contract with Detective Comics wherein they agreed to give Detective right of first refusal with a duration of six weeks over any comics stories they created for the next five years.

In the event you shall do or make any other art work or continuity suitable for use as comics or comic strips, you shall first give us the right of first refusal thereof by submitting said copy and continuity ideas to us. We shall have the right to exercise that option for six weeks after submission to us at a price no greater than offered to you by any other party.

[...]

This agreement shall be for a period of five years from the date hereof and shall thereafter be continued for an additional five years at our option.

On December 19, 1939, Siegel and Shuster signed a contract which increased their pay rate to $20 per page and promised them 5% of net proceeds from any commercial exploitation of Superman beyond magazines, books, and newspapers.

In November 1938, Siegel proposed to Detective Comics that he do stories of Superman's childhood adventures, with the character calling himself "Superboy". Detective rejected Siegel's pitch. In December 1940, Siegel pitched the idea again with a complete script for the first story, but Detective did not respond within the contractual six weeks.

Siegel served in the US Army from June 1943 to January 1946, and spent most of his service in Hawaii. During this time, his work was taken over by ghostwriters, but Siegel was still paid for each strip. Shuster was also paid for work done by ghost-artists.

In 1944, while Siegel was serving in Hawaii, Detective Comics published a Superboy story in More Fun Comics #101. The story was partially based on the script Siegel had submitted in 1940, and was illustrated by Shuster. Detective had done this without informing Siegel; he learned about it in a letter from Shuster.

== 1947–1948: Siegel and Shuster sue for ownership of Superman and Superboy ==
In 1947, Siegel and Shuster sued National Comics Publications for the rights to both Superman and Superboy and a "just share" of all profits that National and its partners made off the character. The suit was filed with the Supreme Court of the State of New York, in Westchester County. The case was presided over by Judge J. Addison Young.

=== Regarding the ownership of Superman ===
Siegel and Shuster argued that the March 1, 1938 contract in which they sold Superman to Detective Comics, Inc. should be voided because it lacked sufficient consideration for Siegel and Shuster. Judge Young ruled that the $130 mentioned in the contract was not payment for the copyright to Superman but their wages for the thirteen pages of Superman stories they made for Action Comics #1. Young referred to their December 4, 1937 employment contract, which gave Detective Comics, Inc. the right of first refusal over any comic magazine material Siegel and Shuster produced, and which stipulated a pay rate of $10 per page. The $130 mentioned in the March 1, 1938 contract was therefore a superfluous assessment of their wages which were already owed, and not payment for the copyright to Superman.

It is quite apparent that the $130.00 which is the recited consideration in said instrument was already due and owing the plaintiffs before the instrument was executed. It was therefore past consideration and insufficient to support Plaintiffs' Ex. 11. [...] The terms of the contract of December 4th, 1937, though primarily relating to the features specified therein, also related to future dealings between plaintiffs and Detective Comics as to other features and as to these other features Detective Comics, Inc. were given a first option to accept or reject them. In effect, therefore, the instrument of March 1st, 1938 represented the exercise by Detective Comics of the option granted to it by the December 4th, 1937 agreement. It is therefore argued that the specific mention of $130.00 as a consideration in the March 1st, 1938 instrument was superfluous and unnecessary to its validity so far as the element of consideration is concerned...

— Judge Young, November 21, 1947

Judge Young concluded that the consideration that Siegel and Shuster had effectively bargained for was simply to see Superman published.

...the plaintiffs' desire to see Superman in print and the realization of that desire by Detective Comics' acceptance of the strip for publication and actually publishing it were the most vital elements of the consideration supporting the instrument date March 1st, 1938.

— Judge Young, November 21, 1947

Siegel and Shuster also argued that the March 1938 contract lacked mutuality, saying that at the time Superman was an idea not fully developed and thus there was no clear concept on what was being sold. Judge Young disagreed, and concluded that the strips that appeared in Action Comics #1 were based on a fully developed concept that Siegel and Shuster submitted before March 1938, and this is what Detective Comics, Inc. had purchased in the contract.

...the fact stands out that the first Superman release had been delivered for publication prior to March 1st, 1938 and this release certainly contained a full delineation of the character Superman and though the story or continuity might vary from time to time, it did I believe constitute a formula for the continuing series to come and in my opinion this was assignable and was purchased by the defendant.

— Judge Young, November 21, 1947

On April 12, 1948, Young declared that Superman belonged to National.

=== Regarding the ownership of Superboy ===
National argued that Superboy was a work made for hire, but Judge Young rejected this argument because Detective Comics, Inc., on both occasions Siegel proposed his idea, had not indicated within six weeks of submission that it wished to publish Superboy, thereby effectively refusing it under the terms of their September 1938 contract.

DETECTIVE COMICS, INC. did not within six weeks after the submission of the said script or scenario indicate its election to publish the said comic strip SUPERBOY.

— Judge Young, April 12, 1948

National argued that Superboy was a derivative work of Superman, but Young ruled that Superboy was a separate entity.

I cannot accept defendants view that Superboy was in reality Superman. I think Superboy was a separate and distinct entity. In having published Superboy without right, plaintiffs are entitled to an injunction preventing such publication and under the circumstances I believe the defendants should account as to the income received from such publication and that plaintiffs should be given an opportunity to proves any damages they have sustained on account thereof.

— Judge Young, November 21, 1947

On April 12, 1948, Young ruled that Siegel was "the originator and the sole owner" of Superboy, and ordered National to account for the proceeds it made of Superboy and to cease publishing Superboy stories.

=== Regarding unpaid royalties ===
Siegel and Shuster argued that National had cheated them of their royalties from the radio adaptation of Superman and merchandising. Their December 1939 contract entitled them to 5% of the net proceeds from all commercial exploitation of Superman beyond books, magazines, and newspapers. They argued that National had understated the proceeds and did not allow Siegel and Shuster access to the accounting records. Judge Young agreed that there were irregularities and decided an official accounting of all proceeds made from Superman was appropriate.

...defendant NATIONAL COMICS PUBLICATIONS, INC. and INDEPENDENT NEWS CO. INC. shall account to plaintiffs before said Official Referee for all profits realized by said NATIONAL COMICS PUBLICATIONS, INC., DETECTIVE COMICS, INC., SUPERMAN, INC. and INDEPENDENT NEWS CO., INC. through the production of radio features and moving pictures entitled SUPERMAN and by the sale of commercial licenses of all kinds, and that the profits derived therefrom be divided according to law, and that the plaintiffs have their just share thereof...

— Judge Young, April 12, 1948

=== Conclusion ===
Judge Young concluded, in April 1948, that National owned Superman but Siegel owned Superboy. He ordered National to account before the court all proceeds made from Superman and Superboy.

The parties instead chose to settle out-of-court. National paid Siegel and Shuster $94,013.16 ($1,230,374 when adjusted for inflation) for the rights to both Superman and Superboy. On May 21, 1948, Young entered a final judgment which vacated his April judgment, and ruled that the copyrights to Superman and Superboy belonged to National Comics Publications, Inc.:

ORDERED AND ADJUDGED that plaintiffs, their agents, servants and employees, be and they hereby are enjoined and restrained from creating, publishing, selling or distributing or permitting or causing to be created, published, sold or distributed any material of the nature heretofore created, produced or published under the title SUPERMAN, or any material created, produced or published in imitation thereof, or from using, permitting or causing to be used in connection with any comic strip or other material created by them the title SUPERMAN or any title imitative of the title SUPERMAN or which shall contain as part thereof the word 'SUPER'; and it is further DECLARED AND ADJUDGED that defendant NATIONAL COMICS PUBLICATIONS, INC. is the sole and exclusive owner and has the sole and exclusive right to the use of the title SUPERBOY...

— Judge Young, May 21, 1948

== 1965–1974: Copyright-renewal applications and lawsuit ==
Under the Copyright Act of 1909, a copyright lasted 28 years. Near the end of this term, the original owners of the copyright could apply to have the copyright renewed for another 28 years, in which case the copyright would revert back to them. In April 1965, Siegel and Shuster applied to renew the copyright of Superman, and that June, National Periodical Publications filed its own renewal application. National kept publishing Superman stories and licensing Superman merchandise after April 18, 1966, the date the initial 28-year term ended.

In 1969, Siegel and Shuster sued National Periodical Publications in United States District Court for the Southern District of New York over ownership of Superman.

The court found that in the 1947 final consent judgment, Siegel and Shuster had transferred "all their rights" to the Superman character to National, including the renewal term. This decision was based on the legal precedent set by Fred Fisher Music Co. v. M. Witmark & Sons, in which the US Supreme Court ruled that an author could in writing convey his renewal rights in advance of their vesting.

The court also ruled that Superman was a work made for hire, despite the fact that Siegel and Shuster had been developing the character long before they began employment at National. The court argued that Detective Comics had rejected Siegel and Shuster's earlier prototype of Superman and that the revised version that appeared in Action Comics #1 was made under the supervision of Detective Comics.

The court in the Westchester action explicitly found that the original (1933) embodiment of the Superman concept consisted of "a few panels suitable for newspaper syndication" (Finding of Fact 19), and that the strip was suitable for magazine publication only after plaintiffs "resubmitted such revised and expanded material" to Detective (Findings of Fact 21, 22). Moreover, the Westchester court found that the Action Comics strip of 1938, rather than the 1933 newspaper strip, "constituted the formula for the continuing SUPERMAN series to come" (Finding of Fact 22).

=== Siegel and Shuster appeal to the Second Circuit ===
Siegel and Shuster appealed to the United States Court of Appeals for the Second Circuit.

The appeals court disagreed with the lower court's decision that Superman was a work made for hire.

The court below instead relied upon finding of fact no. 22 in which the state court found that the plaintiffs did revise and expand the Superman material at the request of the defendants and that this revised material constituted the formula for the ensuing series of strips. We do not consider this tantamount to a conclusion that Superman was a work for hire. That doctrine is applicable only when the employee's work is produced at the instance and expense of the employer [...] or, in other words, when the "motivating factor in producing the work was the employer who induced the creation ...,"

[...]

In the case before us Superman and his miraculous powers were completely developed long before the employment relationship was instituted. The record indicates that the revisions directed by the defendants were simply to accommodate Superman to a magazine format. We do not consider this sufficient to create the presumption that the strip was a work for hire.

Nevertheless, they agreed that Siegel and Shuster had indeed transferred their renewal rights and thus were not entitled to the copyright for Superman.

== 1975: Public relations campaign for comics creators ==
In 1975, Warner Bros. announced the production of a Superman film to be directed by Richard Donner. Siegel publicly condemned the project and drew attention to his poverty and the apathy of DC Comics. He found sympathizers such as Neal Adams and Jerry Robinson, who waged a public relations campaign for better treatment of comic creators in general. In order to avoid bad press, Warner Bros. agreed to give Siegel and Shuster a yearly stipend, medical benefits, and credit their names in all future Superman stories, in exchange for no longer contesting ownership of Superman. The stipend was initially $20,000 but rose over the years.

== 1992: Shuster dies ==
Shuster died on July 30, 1992, and he willed control of his estate to his sister, Jean Shuster Peavy. On October 2, 1992, Jean Peavy and Frank Shuster (Joe Shuster's brother) signed an agreement with DC Comics wherein they re-granted DC all of Joe Shuster's rights in exchange for a $25,000 annual stipend. The agreement read:

We ask you to confirm by your signatures below that this agreement fully settles all claims to any payments or other rights or remedies which you may have under any other agreement or otherwise, whether now or hereafter existing regarding any copyrights, trademarks, or other property right in any and all work created in whole or in part by your brother, Joseph Shuster, or any works based thereon. In any event, you now grant to us any such rights and release us, our licensees and all others acting with our permission, and covenant not to assert any claim of right, by suit or otherwise, with respect to the above, now and forever.

In a 2010 lawsuit (see below), DC Comics claimed it and its affiliates had paid Shuster's heirs "close to $500,000" under this agreement.

== 1996: Siegel dies ==
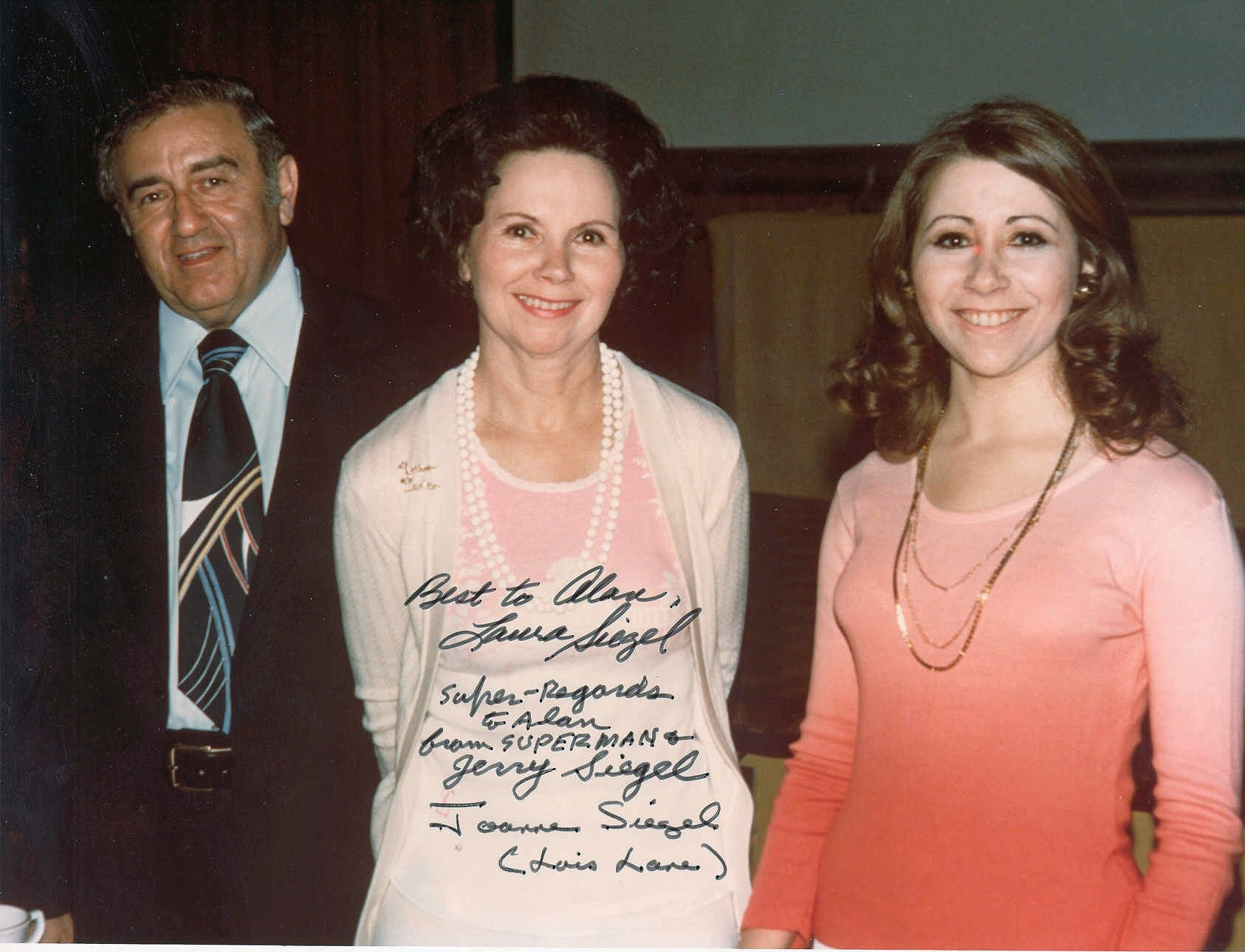
Jerry Siegel, his wife Joanne, and daughter Laura (1976)

When Siegel died on January 28, 1996, his estate passed to his widow Joanne Siegel, son Michael Siegel, and daughter Laura Siegel Larson, who held respectively 25%, 12.5%, and 12.5% of the interest in Superman.

The Copyright Act of 1976 contained a provision which allowed for a creator to terminate their grant of the copyright to their work 56 years after the date the copyright was first secured. The creator would then have a five-year window to do so. The creator, however, would have to serve a notice of termination in advance of the effective date; between two and ten years in advance. Action Comics #1 was published on April 18, 1938. Consequently, Superman's copyright would become eligible for termination beginning April 18, 1994 and ending April 18, 1999, and the termination notices had to be served between April 18, 1984, and April 18, 1997. Likewise, Superboy's copyright became eligible for termination between December 2000 and December 2005, and the notices had to be served sometime between and December 1990 and December 2003.

Siegel never applied for termination, but his heirs did after his death. On April 3, 1997, Joanne Siegel and Laura Siegel Larson served DC Comics a termination notice for Superman which became effective on April 16, 1999. The Siegel heirs now owned 50% of Superman, the other half remaining with DC Comics.

Warner Bros. attempted to negotiate an agreement with Siegel's heirs in order to retain Siegel's half of the rights to Superman. On October 16, 2001, Warner made an offer. Warner offered a payment of $3 million, an annual stipend of $500,000, a 6% royalty of Superman and a 1% royalty of his publications, and full medical benefits. Warner also agreed to insert the line "By Special Arrangement with the Jerry Siegel Family" in all future Superman productions. The Siegel heirs accepted this offer in an October 19 letter released by their lawyer, Kevin Marks.

== Marc Toberoff's offer to the Siegel and Shuster heirs ==
In 2001, Jean Peavy's son and Joe Shuster's nephew, Mark Warren Peary, contacted attorney and movie producer Marc Toberoff. On November 23, Peavy and Peary entered into a joint venture with Toberoff's production firm, Pacific Pictures. Toberoff then contacted the Siegel heirs, first through a phone call to their lawyer, Kevin Marks, on November 29, 2001. In negotiations the following year, Toberoff and his colleague Ari Emanuel offered the Siegel heirs $15 million for their half of rights to Superman. Toberoff's plan was to eventually produce a Superman movie after securing the rights to Superman from Siegel and Shuster's heirs.

On September 21, 2002, the Siegel heirs fired Marks and later replaced him with Toberoff. On September 30, the Siegel heirs sent a letter to DC Comics stating that the negotiations were over.

On November 8, 2002, Siegel's heirs filed termination notices for the Superboy character and claimed full ownership of the character. This termination would have taken effect on November 17, 2004. On August 27, 2004, DC Comics denied the notices. The Siegels then took DC Comics to court.

Under the terms of the Copyright Act of 1976 in its original form, only the spouse, children, or grandchildren of a dead author could terminate a grant of copyright. This had prevented Shuster's sister and nephew from terminating Shuster's grant of his half of the copyright to Superman in the years following his death. In 1998, the Sonny Bono Copyright Term Extension Act modified the law to allow executors of estates to terminate. Under the original law, the window to serve the termination notice had ended in 1997, but the Sonny Bono Act also added a new subsection allowing the Shuster heirs to terminate 75 to 80 years after the copyright was first secured (with the usual two- to ten-year advance notice). The Shuster heirs could terminate their grant between 2013 and 2018, and the termination notice would have to be served between 2003 and 2016. On November 7, 2003, Peary served DC Comics with a notice of termination of Shuster's grant of the rights to Superman. He assigned Shuster's half of the rights to Superman to Pacific Pictures.

== 2004–2016: Siegel's heirs sue ==
On October 8, 2004, Siegel's heirs filed suit in the United States District Court for the Central District of California to assert their claim they owned 50% of the copyright of Superman (the other half being Shuster's). On October 22, 2004, Siegel heirs filed another lawsuit in the same court over the rights to Superboy. They claimed 100% ownership of the Superboy character, as it was solely the creation of Siegel. Marc Toberoff represented the Siegels in both cases.

The cases were assigned to Judge Ronald S.W. Lew on September 21, 2005. The following year, Lew took senior status and the cases were eventually reassigned to Judge Stephen G. Larson on October 30, 2006. In November 2009, Larson recused himself and the cases were reassigned to Judge Otis D. Wright II.

Joanne Siegel died on February 12, 2011, before the cases were resolved. Her daughter, Laura Siegel Larson, took over the cases and became executor of the Siegel estate.

=== Regarding Superman ===
DC Comics argued that the October 19, 2001 letter from the Siegels constituted a binding acceptance of DC's offer for the rights to Superman. However, Judge Larson found that the parties kept changing the terms of the agreement in subsequent correspondence, and thus never came to a stable agreement that the courts could enforce.

One need only review the language of the parties’ correspondence, their conduct in reaction thereto, and the numerous material differences between the terms relayed in the October 19 and 26, 2001, letters and the February 1, 2002, draft to reach the conclusion that the parties failed to come to an agreement on all material terms.

[...]

The Court’s responsibility is not to create a patch-quilt agreement by stringing together certain expressions of assent made at one point (October 19), and attaching to it material terms spelled out later in time (and to which the supposedly assenting party promptly rejected).

[...]

Accordingly, the Court concludes that the parties’ settlement negotiations did not result in an enforceable agreement resolving the issues presently before the Court.

Larson ruled that the Siegel heirs had regained half of the rights to Action Comics #1.

After seventy years, Jerome Siegel’s heirs regain what he granted so long ago — the copyright in the Superman material that was published in Action Comics, Vol. 1. What remains is an apportionment of profits, guided in some measure by the rulings contained in this Order, and a trial on whether to include the profits generated by DC Comics’ corporate sibling’s exploitation of the Superman copyright.

In an August 12, 2009 supplement, Larson further elaborated his ruling.

...the Court finds that plaintiffs have successfully recaptured (and are co-owners of) the rights to the following works: (1) [**165] Action Comics No. 1 (subject to the limitations set forth in the Court's previous Order); (2) Action Comics No. 4; (3) Superman No. 1, pages three through six, and (4) the initial two weeks' worth of Superman daily newspaper strips. Ownership in the remainder of the Superman material at issue that was published from 1938 to 1943 remains solely with defendants.

=== Regarding Superboy ===
DC Comics argued that Superboy was a work made for hire and thus DC owned the character from conception; that Superboy was a derivative work of Superman and thus Siegel had no right to it because DC owned Superman; and that Superboy was a joint work between Siegel and Shuster and thus Siegel's heirs lacked the majority interest required to terminate.

On March 23, 2006, Judge Lew concluded that, in the 1947-48 lawsuit (see above), Judge Young already addressed and rejected these arguments and that res judicata and collateral estoppel precluded re-litigation. Lew ruled that the Siegel heirs had effectively terminated Siegel's grant of the rights to Superboy. He also ruled that the protagonist of the television show Smallville was Superboy.

After Judge Larson took over the case in October 2006, DC Comics moved for reconsideration of Lew's decision, and on July 27, 2007, Larson vacated Lew's ruling regarding the terminations of DC's Superboy right.

=== DC Comics appeals to the Ninth Circuit ===
DC Comics appealed to the United States Court of Appeals for the Ninth Circuit. Arguments were held on November 5, 2012.

The court reversed the District Court's grant of summary judgment, ruling that the October 19, 2001 letter from the Siegels (see above) constituted a legally binding acceptance of the October 16 oral agreement with DC Comics. The court ruled that, even though the agreement had not been finalized, the terms were "sufficiently definite that a court could enforce them". In a January 2013 memorandum, the presiding judges wrote:

California law permits parties to bind themselves to a contract, even when they anticipate that "some material aspects of the deal [will] be papered later." [...] This principle applies notwithstanding the lack of an express reference to an intended future agreement, as long as the terms of any contract that may have been formed are sufficiently definite that a court could enforce them (as is undoubtedly the case here).

The appeals court remanded the case back to the District Court. In an April 18, 2013 judgment, Judge Wright denied all of the Siegel heirs' claims and ruled that the October 19, 2001 letter irrevocably gave DC Comics the rights to Superman and Superboy.

The Court declares that, under the parties’ October 19, 2001 settlement agreement, Larson and her family transferred to DC, worldwide and in perpetuity, any and all rights, title, and interest, including all copyright interests, that they may have in Superman, Superboy, and Spectre.

— Judge Wright, April 18, 2013

=== Larson appeals to the Ninth Circuit ===
Laura Siegel Larson appealed Wright's April 2013 judgment to the Ninth Circuit.

Larson argued that the October 2001 letter did not transfer the rights to Superboy because at the time of its writing the Siegel heirs had not yet terminated DC Comics' rights to Superboy. The appeals court rejected this argument.

Larson claimed that her mother Joanne had rescinded the October 2001 letter and that DC Comics agreed to her decision. This was the first time that Larson raised this argument, and the appeals court refused to consider it because doing so would prejudice DC by forcing them to rework their defense from scratch.

On remand, Larson argued for the first time that her mother, Joanne Siegel, had rescinded the 2001 contractual settlement agreement in letters written in 2002 and that DC acquiesced in the recission. As the district court noted, permitting Larson to raise these arguments now would substantially prejudice DC. Joanne Siegel has since died. DC would have to change its defense strategy, conduct new discovery, and the litigation would effectively have to begin all over. The rescission and acquiescence affirmative defenses are therefore waived.

— Feb 10, 2016 memorandum

=== Effects of these cases ===
The television show Legion of Super Heroes, which aired from 2006 to 2008, was originally meant to be titled Superboy and the Legion of Superheroes, but because this ongoing lawsuit left the ownership of Superboy in doubt, Warner Bros. Animation changed the title and replaced the character of Superboy with Superman (although he remained a teenager).

== 2010–2013: DC sues the Shuster heirs ==
In 2010, DC Comics sued Toberoff, Joanne Siegel, Laura Siegel Larson, and Mark Warren Peary. Jean Peavy, incapacitated by a stroke in 2009, was not listed as a defendant in this case. Her son, Mark Warren Peary, was substitute executor for the Shuster estate. DC asked the court to invalidate and void the Shusters' termination notice and the agreements between Toberoff's firms and the heirs of Siegel and Shuster.

The lawsuit was filed with the United States District Court for the Central District of California, and the case assigned to Judge Otis D. Wright II.

The judge agreed with DC's argument that the 1992 agreement with Jean Peavy, the sole heir and executor to Shuster's estate, barred her and all other heirs from pursuing termination. The judge also ruled that the 1992 agreement superseded all prior agreements between Shuster and DC Comics, and as a post-1978 grant it is not subject to termination under § 304(d) of US copyright law. The judge also ruled that the transfer of rights to Pacific Pictures was illegal because it had been made before the effective date of termination of October 26, 2013.

The Shuster heirs appealed to the Ninth Circuit, but the appeals court agreed with Wright's judgment.

== Future ==
The copyright to Action Comics #1 was in its renewal term on October 27, 1998 (the date the Copyright Term Extension Act became effective). This means that the copyright will expire 95 years after it was first secured, i.e. at the end of 2033. Thus, barring new legislation, Superman as he is depicted in Action Comics #1 will become public domain on January 1, 2034, along with other story elements such as Lois Lane. Some later developments of the character, such as his power of "heat vision" (introduced in a 1949 story), may not be available to unlicensed authors as they were introduced in works that will persist longer under copyright. Supporting characters such as Lana Lang, or locales such as the Fortress of Solitude, will also persist for longer in copyright.

== Cited court cases ==
Jerome Siegel and Joseph Shuster vs. National Comics Publications Inc. et al. (New York Supreme Court 1947)
Plaintiff's complaint - November 21, 1947 opinion - April 12, 1948 Findings of Facts and Conclusions of Law - April 12, 1948 Interlocutory judgment - May 21, 1948 Final judgment

Jerome Siegel and Joe Shuster v. National Periodical Publications, Inc., Case No. 69 Civ 1429 (USDC SDNY 1969)
Plaintiffs' complaint - Final decision of the court (October 1973)

Jerome Siegel and Joseph Shuster v. National Periodical Publications, Inc., et al., 508 F.2d 909 (2d Cir. 1974)
Final decision of the court (December 1974)

Laura Siegel Larson et al. v. Warner Bros. Entertainment, Inc. et al., Case No. 2:04-cv-08400-ODW-RZ (USDC CDCA 2004)
Plaintiff's complaint - Judge Larson's March 26, 2008 ruling - August 2009 decision - Final judgment of Judge Wright (April 2013)

Laura Siegel Larson et al. v. Time Warner, Inc. et al., Case No. 2:04-cv-08776 (USDC CDCA 2004)
Plaintiff's complaint - Judge Lew's March 23, 2006 ruling - Ruling of Judge Larson (July 2007) - Final judgment of Judge Wright (April 2013)

Laura Siegel Larson v. Warner Bros. Entertainment, Inc. et al., Case Nos. 11-55863, 11-56034 (9th Cir. 2012).
Final decision (January 10, 2013)

DC Comics v. Pacific Pictures Corp. et al., Case No. CV 2:10-cv-03633 ODW (RZx) (USDC CDCA 2010)
Plaintiffs' complaint (May 2010) - October 2012 grant of summary judgment

DC Comics v. Pacific Pictures Corp. et al., Case No. 11-56934 (9th Cir. 2012)
Final decision (January 2013)

Larson v Warner Bros Entertainment et al., Case No. 13-56243 (9th Cir. 2013)
ruling of the court (February 2016)

== Contracts, agreements, and other legal documents ==
- December 1937 employment contract
- March 1, 1938 contract of sale
- September 22, 1938 employment contract
- 1975 agreement between Warner Bros., Jerry Siegel and Joe Shuster
- 1992 agreement between DC Comics and the Shuster heirs
- October 19, 2001 letter from the Siegel heirs to DC Comics

== US copyright law ==
- Current US copyright law (Title 17 United States Code)
- Sonny Bono Copyright Term Extension Act
- Copyright Act of 1976

== Bibliography ==
- Daniels, Les (1998). Superman: The Complete History (1st ed.). Titan Books. ISBN 1-85286-988-7.
- Leaffer, Marhsall A. (2010). Understanding Copyright Law. LexisNexis. ISBN 9781422486368.
- Ricca, Brad (2014). Super Boys: The Amazing Adventures of Jerry Siegel and Joe Shuster - the Creators of Superman. St. Martin's Griffin. ISBN 978-1250049681.
- Sergi, Joe (2015). The Law for Comic Book Creators: Essential Concepts and Applications. McFarland. ISBN 978-0786473601.
- Tye, Larry (12 June 2012). Superman: The High-Flying History of America's Most Enduring Hero. New York: Random House. ISBN 978-1-58836-918-5.
