= The Joe Shuster Story =

2018 graphic novel by Julian Voloj

The Joe Shuster Story: The Artist Behind Superman
- Author: Julian Voloj
- Illustrator: Thomas Campi
- Cover artist: Thomas Campi
- Language: English
- Subject: Graphic Novel, biography
- Genre: Nonfiction
- Publisher: Super Genius republishing original italian book by BAO Publishing
- Publication date: May 15, 2018
- Publication place: United States/Italy
- Media type: Print (Hardback and Paperback)
- Pages: 164 pages
- ISBN: 978-1-629-91777-1

The Joe Shuster Story: The Artist Behind Superman is a graphic novel written by Julian Voloj and illustrated by Thomas Campi. It is the first graphic novel biography focusing on Superman co-creator Joe Shuster. The book was originally published in Italian and then translated into English.

== Reception ==
The Jewish Book Council said that "The Joe Shuster Story is a tale of unbridled aspiration in a world beset with the cruelties of reality". Publishers Weekly said that the book's art "lends warmth and beauty to this elegy to two kids chewed up by a system that sees dollar signs and goes in for the kill." The Comics Journal called it a "meticulously researched graphic biography" that is "smartly visualized in understated, softly painted Edward Hopper-esque images."

== See also ==
- Boys of Steel, a picture book biography of Siegel and Shuster by Marc Tyler Nobleman and Ross MacDonald
