= Kingsley Books, Inc. v. Brown =

- Supreme Court of the United States

Argued April 22, 1957 Decided June 24, 1957
- Full case name: Kingsley Books, Inc. v. Brown
- Citations: 354 U.S. 436 (more) 77 S. Ct. 1325; 1 L. Ed. 2d 1469

Case history
- Prior: Appeal from the Court of Appeals of New York

Holding
- A state injunction against distribution of material designated as "obscene" does not violate freedom of speech and press protected by the First Amendment and the Due Process Clause of the Fourteenth Amendment.

Court membership
- Chief Justice Earl Warren Associate Justices Hugo Black · Felix Frankfurter; William O. Douglas · Harold H. Burton; Tom C. Clark · John M. Harlan II; William J. Brennan Jr. · Charles E. Whittaker

Case opinions
- Majority: Frankfurter, joined by Burton, Clark, Harlan, Whittaker
- Dissent: Warren
- Dissent: Douglas, joined by Black
- Dissent: Brennan

Laws applied
- U.S. Const. amend. I, XIV

Kingsley Books, Inc. v. Brown, 354 U.S. 436 (1957), was a Supreme Court case that addressed issues of obscenity, free speech, and due process. The case stemmed from the confiscation and destruction of books from a New York City bookstore. The court's determination was that:

A state injunction against distribution of material designated as "obscene" does not violate freedom of speech and press protected by the First Amendment and the Due Process Clause of the Fourteenth Amendment.

== Background ==
Kingsley Books was an adult bookstore that was known for selling erotic material including graphic comic book style material, among which a fetish series entitled Nights of Horror. That particular series garnered public attention in 1954, when it was mentioned during the trial of the Brooklyn Thrill Killers gang: psychiatrist Fredric Wertham had used the book series as evidence, claiming that the gang's leader had become a criminal because he read pornographic comic books. City officials in New York City led by Peter Campbell Brown made the decision to file an injunction against Kingsley Books to both destroy any existing copies of the material but to also enjoin the future sale of the books under statute § 22-a of the New York Code. This statute allowed for officials to prevent the distribution of "lewd or obscene materials" although the action taken was actually civil and not criminal. "A complaint dated September 10, 1954 charged appellants with displaying for sale paper-covered obscene booklets, fourteen of which were annexed under the general title of "Nights of Horror." The complaint requested that appellants be enjoined from further distribution of the booklets, that they be required to surrender to the sheriff for destruction all copies in their possession, and, upon failure to do so, that the sheriff be commanded to seize and destroy those copies". The fact that the sheriff was responsible for handling this civil action was partly why the case had issues with due process. Kingsley failed to contest the filing and a judge at trial ruled that the books were indeed obscene. The judge failed to ban distribution of future issues of the series as he found that such an injunction would violate the constitutional protections against free speech, and specifically prior restraint. The ruling was appealed and eventually the case went to the Supreme Court of the United States.

== Case Issues ==
The primary issue surrounding the case was the First Amendment right to free speech, and obscenity. The central issue surrounding the case was: Does imposing an injunction on the sale of obscene books and destroying the obscene material violate a bookseller's rights under the First Amendment as a prior restraint? Additionally there were minor questions related to the Fourteenth Amendment and due process that were also brought before the court.

At no point in the appeal was there a challenge to whether the book in question was actually obscene, rather the challenge was whether the statutes themselves were actually constitutional.

== Arguments ==
The case was presented to the court on April 22, 1957. Emanuel Redford represented Kingsley and Seymour B. Quel represented Brown and New York. The ACLU and the NYCLU provided briefs on behalf of Kingsley. The Attorney General Louis Lefkowitz and the assistant Attorney General Ruth K. Toch wrote briefs on behalf of Brown and New York. The members presiding over the Supreme Court were Chief Justice Earl Warren, Justice Felix Frankfurter, Justice William Douglas, Justice Hugo Black, Justice William Brennan, Justice John Marshall Harlan, Justice Charles Whittaker, Justice Harold Burton, and Justice Tom Clark.

== Decision ==
The Court reached a decision on June 24, 1957. The court ruled in favor of the state in a 5–4 vote. The court's main contention was based on the civil nature of the statute: “The judicial angle of vision in testing the validity of a statute like Section 22-a is 'the operation and effect of the statute in substance.' The phrase 'prior restraint' is not a self-wielding sword. Nor can it serve as a talismanic test… Instead of requiring the bookseller to dread that the offer for sale of a book may, without prior warning, subject him to a criminal prosecution with the hazard of imprisonment, the civil procedure assures him that such consequences cannot follow unless he ignores a court order specifically directed to him for a prompt and carefully circumscribed determination of the issue of obscenity. Until then, he may keep the book for sale and sell it on his own judgment rather than steer ‘nervously among the treacherous shoals.'” Justice Frankfurter wrote the majority opinion on the case. The court ruled that all of the procedures complied with the rules for due process ending the arguments on the Fourteenth Amendment. The major ruling, however, was the continuing adherence to the thought that the First Amendment right to free speech does not extend to obscene speech or material.

Both Justices Warren and Douglas wrote dissenting opinions on the case. Justice Warren felt that the majority opinion was incorrect because this was a civil and not criminal case. He wrote: “This is not a criminal obscenity case. Nor is it a case ordering the destruction of materials disseminated by a person who has been convicted of an offense for doing so, as would be authorized under provisions in the laws of New York and other States. It is a case wherein the New York police, under a different state statute, located books which, in their opinion, were unfit for public use because of obscenity and then obtained a court order for their condemnation and destruction.

Warren, dissenting:

"The majority opinion sanctions this proceeding. I would not. Unlike the criminal cases decided today, this New York law places the book on trial. There is totally lacking any standard in the statute for judging the book in context. The personal element basic to the criminal laws is entirely absent. In my judgment, the same object may have wholly different impact depending upon the setting in which it is placed. Under this statute, the setting is irrelevant."

The ramifications of the ruling being upheld left Kingsley Books forced to answer and pay for the original charges.

== Significance ==
The outcome of the cases led to a hard line drawn on civil liberties as it pertained to free speech and adult content. These rulings held up over many years and set the various adult content industries back for quite some time, limiting the type, amount and variety of adult content that was readily available to consumers. Although the court didn't actually have to rule on whether or not the book was actually obscene was due to it not being contested, an issue which would allow for other cases to question what actually constitutes obscene in future cases.

This case did however empower the states to regulate what was and wasn't obscene as long as it was done in a manner that allowed the content to actually be produced and evaluated first. “Criminal enforcement and the proceeding under Section 22-a interfere with a book's solicitation of the public precisely at the same stage. In each situation the law moves after publication; the book need not in either case have yet passed into the hands of the public”.

== See also ==
- Freedom of speech in the United States
- Due process in the United States
- Obscenity laws of the United States
