= Brooklyn Thrill Killers =

1954 New York City teenage gang

- Years active: 1954
- Territory: Brooklyn, New York City, New York, United States
- Ethnicity: Jewish American
- Membership: 4 teenagers
- Activities: hate crime, murder, assault, torture

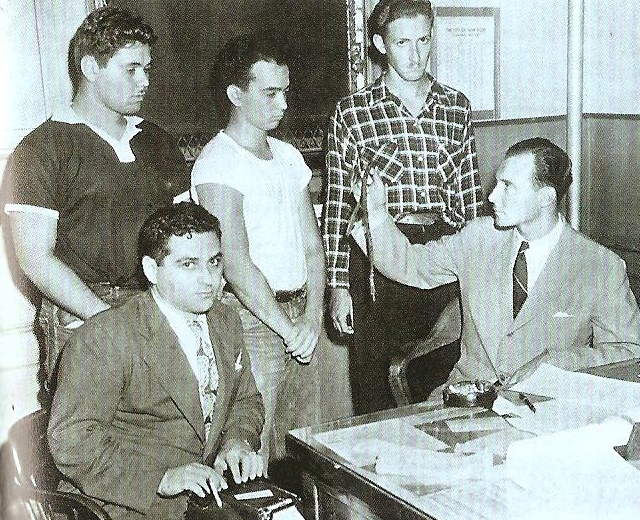
Three of the boys standing before the district Attorney, who holds up the bullwhip used in one of the attacks.

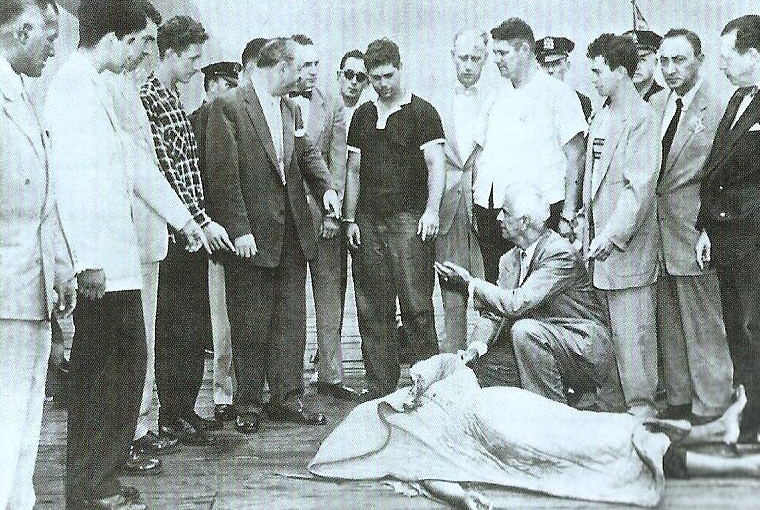
The boys, handcuffed, alongside the corpse of Willard Mentor.

The Brooklyn Thrill Killers were a group of American teenage boys who were convicted of killing one man and accused of killing another (one by drowning, the other by beating) and committed acts of assault and torture against several other people in Brooklyn, a borough of New York City during the summer of 1954. The case attracted considerable media attention in the United States. It also fueled the controversy over comic books, which were accused at the time of causing sexual perversion and juvenile delinquency.

== Members ==
The four members of the gang were teenagers who belonged to Brooklyn's Jewish community:

- Jack Koslow, 18
- Melvin Mittman, 17
- Jerome Lieberman, 17
- Robert Trachtenberg, 15

== Crimes ==
Jack Koslow, who was later identified by AP reports as the 'brains' of the group, admired the crackdown that police commissioner Francis Adams was conducting at the time in Manhattan against "social undesirables", and thought similar actions were needed to "cleanse" the streets of Brooklyn. During the summer of 1954, the crackdown in Manhattan had intensified and many "undesirables" – among whom gay men, homeless people and alcoholics – had sought refuge in Brooklyn, which inspired Koslow and his friends to take action.

The four boys roamed the streets of Brooklyn, assaulting girls and beating up vagrants. Koslow, who read comic books, saw himself as a crime-fighting hero and believed that his actions would help the police to restore "law and order". Mittman later commented that their goal had been to "clean the streets of bums". The first man killed by the gang was a local homeless alcoholic named Reinhold Ulrickson, whom they kicked and punched to death. Their second victim was Willard Mentor, a 34-year old black man who worked at a local bag factory. Koslow and Mittman found Mentor as he was sleeping on a bench after a drinking binge. They beat him and threw him in the East River, where he drowned. The four gang members were arrested shortly after Mentor's murder.

After their arrest, Mittman and Koslow were belligerent and bragged that murdering Mentor had been a "supreme adventure". Koslow stated that he considered vagrants to be social "parasites". Trachtenberg and Lieberman, who had not participated in Mentor's murder, appeared to be relieved by their arrest.

The four boys admitted to a litany of offenses, which included pouring gasoline over a man and setting him alight, and horsewhipping two young women in a public park late at night. The nickname "thrill killers" was given to them by the media after Kings County's District Attorney commented that the boys, who never robbed any of their victims, "apparently had no reason except the thrill they got".

The crimes generated a media frenzy at the time in the United States, where the four boys were presented as symbols of juvenile delinquency. The New York Times wrote that the gang members were also homosexuals and neo-nazis, Life called them "Those Terrible Youth", while Inside Detective magazine nicknamed Koslow – who wore a moustache – the “Boy Hitler of Flatbush Avenue.” The notoriety of the case was such at the time that in 1955, columnist Hedda Hopper suggested that the Brooklyn killers had been inspirations for the character played by James Dean in Rebel Without a Cause.

The boys were never charged with the death of Reinhold Ulrickson - though they had admitted to it - nor with other allegations such as setting a man on fire and assaulting young girls.

== Trial and convictions ==
At the trial, Koslow's attorney was senator Fred G. Moritt, who tried to paint the boys' actions as simple mischief and implied that Mentor's death was not a loss for society. Trachtenberg turned State's evidence and was eventually sent to a reformatory. Lieberman had the charges against him dismissed for lack of evidence. Koslow and Mittman were found guilty of felony murder during the act of kidnapping, because Mentor had been dragged several blocks before being thrown in the river. This allowed the jury to suggest life in prison rather than send two youths to the electric chair. Koslow and Mittman eventually won their appeal: at their retrial, they pleaded guilty of second degree murder and were sentenced to 10 to 20 years, receiving credit for the four years they had already served in jail. The sentence made them eligible for parole in 1961.

== Public reaction ==
The case of the Brooklyn Thrill Killers is mostly remembered for its role in the controversy which surrounded at the time the comic book industry. The Court's appointed psychiatric expert was Dr Fredric Wertham, a leading critic of comic books, who had published Seduction of the Innocent earlier that year. Wertham cited the Thrill Killers as an example of the potential harm caused by comic books. Specifically, a fetish pornographic comic book series named Nights of Horror was brought as evidence of Jack Koslow's "sexual perversions", and used to convict him and Mittman of their crimes. When Wertham presented Koslow with copies of Nights of Horror, Koslow admitted that he read comics of that kind. Wertham concluded that the books were to blame for the crimes. However, Koslow never specifically stated that he had read Nights of Horror, and there was no evidence that any of the boys had purchased or read that particular comic book.

As a result of its involvement in the trial, the Nights of Horror comic book series was seized and banned first by New York City, then by the State of New York. The case went to the Supreme Court of the United States, which upheld the ban in its Kingsley Books, Inc. v. Brown 1957 ruling.

The outrage surrounding this case fueled the public backlash against comic books, which resulted in the creation of the Comics Code Authority in October 1954. Several decades later, it was revealed that the artist of Nights of Horror was Joe Shuster, the co-creator of Superman, a comic book also frequently denounced in Wertham's writings.

== Legacy ==
Derek Davidson and Paul Franco wrote and directed a 1999 short film about the events surrounding the incident and starring Chip Zien, Anne Meara, and Dan Fogler.

According to historian Andrew Scott Cooper, Robert Rauschenberg placed a news clippings about this case in his combine painting Collection (1954/1955), which Cooper interprets as connecting the work to McCarthyism's hostility to homosexuality. After researching the painting, Cooper sought New York state and city records and interviewed Mittman in 2005. Cooper believes the accusations against the four were heavily exaggerated and sensationalized, as autopsy records do not support the police's claims, and the confessions given by the four were under extreme duress.

== Bibliography ==
- Mariah Adin, The Brooklyn Thrill-Kill Gang and the Great Comic Book Scare of the 1950s, Praeger Publishers Inc, 2014
