= Lafargue Clinic =

Former universalist mental hospital in Manhattan, New York

Lafargue Mental Health Clinic
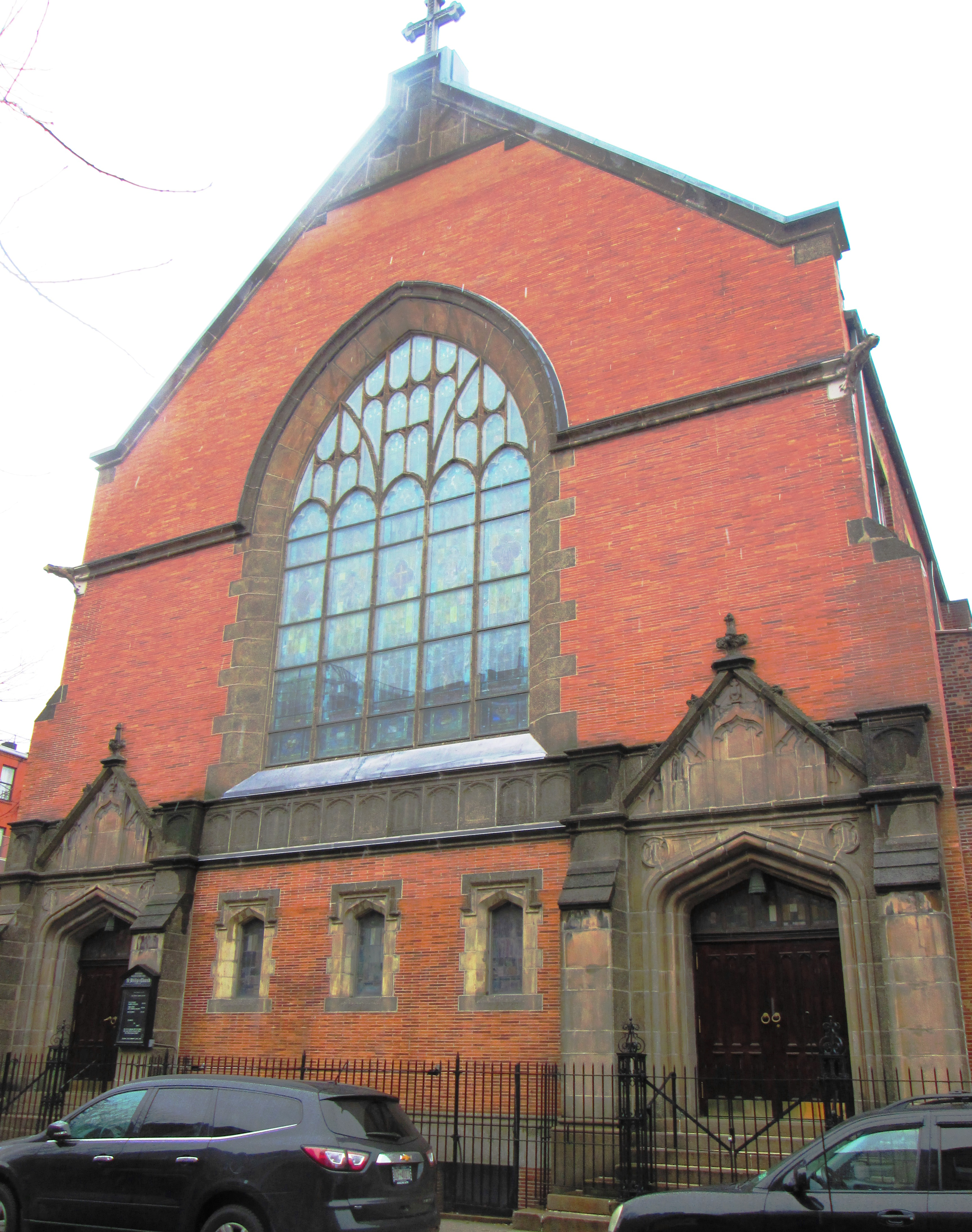
- The facade of St. Philip's Episcopal Church, on whose property the Lafargue Clinic operated

Geography
- Location: St. Philip's Episcopal Church; 215 West 133rd Street, Manhattan, New York, United States
- Coordinates: 40°48′53″N 73°56′43″W

Organization
- Care system: Mental health

History
- Founded: March 8, 1946
- Closed: November 1, 1958

Links
- Lists: Hospitals in New York State
- Other links: Hospitals in Manhattan

The Lafargue Mental Health Clinic, more commonly known as the Lafargue Clinic, was a mental health clinic that operated in Harlem, Manhattan, New York, from 1946 until 1958. The clinic was named for French Marxist physician Paul Lafargue and conceived by German-American psychiatrist Fredric Wertham, who recognized the dire state of mental health services for blacks in New York. With the backing of black intellectuals Richard Wright and Ralph Ellison, as well as members of the church and community, the clinic operated out of the parish house basement of St. Philip's Episcopal Church and was among the first to provide low-cost psychiatric health services to the poor, especially for poor blacks who either could not afford treatment at New York hospitals or faced racial discrimination from doctors and other hospital staff. The staff consisted entirely of volunteers, and Wertham and Hilde Mosse were the clinic's lead doctors.

Though the clinic only operated for 12 years, Wertham and Mosse's experiences from Lafargue were cited in a court decision to integrate schools in Wilmington, Delaware, and later in Brown v. Board of Education, which ruled that separate black and white schools were unconstitutional. Wertham would use case studies from his time at the clinic to support his later arguments that comic books caused juvenile delinquency, as evidenced in his 1954 work Seduction of the Innocent.

== Background ==
The Freudians talk about the Id
And bury it below.
But Richard Wright took off the lid
And let us see the woe.

— Fredric Wertham, 1942, "Underground"

Plans for the Lafargue Clinic began when Fredric Wertham, then chief psychiatrist at Queens General Hospital, agreed in 1942 to see author Ralph Ellison, who "refused to serve in a Jim Crow army," for a psychiatric visit intended to find grounds to void Ellison's draft notice. The meeting between the two men was set up by Richard Wright, then an established Harlem intellectual. In September 1946, after the establishment of the clinic, Wright penned an article in Free World titled Psychiatry Comes to Harlem, where he described the destitute state of mental health services for blacks in New York: "[T]hat Harlem's 400,000 black people produced 53% of all the juvenile delinquents of Manhattan, which has a white population of 1,600,000; that, while in theory Negroes have access to psychiatric aid (just as the Negroes of Mississippi, in theory, have access to the vote!), such aid really does not exist[,] owing to the subtle but effective racial discrimination that obtains against Negroes in almost all New York City hospitals and clinics; that it is all but impossible for Negro interns to gain admission to hospitals to receive their psychiatric training."

Wright noted that Wertham long recognized the subpar state of black psychiatric services, and that "Wertham's attitude is that psychiatry is for everybody or none at all." Wertham also unsuccessfully petitioned mayor Fiorello H. La Guardia to create preventive psychiatry facilities in Harlem for at least ten years, adding to his frustration with the city's treatment of black mental patients.

== Founding ==
Ellison brought the idea of the clinic to Sheldon Hale Bishop, the reverend at St. Philip's Episcopal Church, who agreed to house the clinic in two rooms of the parish house basement. The clinic, which the men named after French Marxist physician Paul Lafargue, opened on March 8, 1946, and served patients from 6 to 8 o'clock on Tuesdays and Thursdays. According to Dennis Doyle, a medical historian and expert on Lafargue, demand was so great for services that "the waiting list was still full in the clinic's final years". The clinic's staff was interracial, and most were professionally accredited. Their ranks included psychiatrists and psychiatric nurses, social workers and psychologists, as well as teachers and psychology students.

The clinic saw around 70% adults and 30% children (other progressive psychiatrists opened another Harlem facility in 1946 called the Northside Center, which primarily served children), and operated under what Doyle referred to as a combination of "race-blind universalism" (which meant that doctors did not, as was common practice at the time, make adjustments in their diagnoses for biological conceptions of race) and social psychiatry, at that time a new clinical approach. Said Wertham, "[W]e're not here to make a study of the Negro. . .We're simply here to treat them like other human beings".

== Operation ==
One must descend to the basement and move along a confusing mazelike hall to reach it. Twice the passage seems to lead against a blank wall; then at last one enters the brightly lighted auditorium. And here, finally, are the social workers at the reception desks; and there, waiting upon the benches rowed beneath the pipes carrying warmth and water to the floors above, are the patients. One sees white-jacketed psychiatrists carrying charts appear and vanish behind screens that form the improvised interviewing cubicles. All is an atmosphere of hurried efficiency; and the concerned faces of the patients are brightened by the friendly smiles and low-pitched voices of the expert workers. One has entered the Lafargue Psychiatric Clinic.

— Ralph Ellison, Harlem Is Nowhere

The clinic was only psychotherapeutic, meaning that it could not treat psychoses or other brain diseases. However, it treated minor neuroses and emotional disturbances, and frequently referred its patients to other inpatient facilities. 21% of adult patients during the clinic's operation were diagnosed with psychosis, and the clinic was able to detect mental defects and disorders previously undiagnosed.

When doctors at Lafargue made a diagnosis of a serious brain disease, they referred their patients to outside hospitals, providing blacks a pathway to proper medical care. 12% of Lafargue patients received inpatient care elsewhere in the city. In some cases, patients who received referrals would follow through with treatment, but others did not. A woman known only as Rachel, listed in records as being the clinic's first referral, was referred by head physician Hilde Mosse to a respected gynecology clinic outside of Harlem for menorrhagia (excessive vaginal bleeding). She had the exam performed and came back to tell Mosse about the visit. A teenage boy named Chris, the son of Southern migrants, was treated for "bad blood", a Southern euphemism for syphilis, and was referred out to a local medical clinic for a spinal tap; however, the boy and his mother skipped the referral appointment and ended their counseling sessions at Lafargue due to the pain of the procedure.

In addition, the clinic served as a de facto social welfare office, providing connections to public housing and welfare offices, and hosting a desegregated chapter of Alcoholics Anonymous. Indeed, Wertham and Mosse reasoned that improvements in the social conditions of Harlem would "relieve the main source of anxiety for an estimated third of their patients".

== Decline and closure ==
In 1954, New York State passed the Community Mental Health Services Act, establishing mental health boards in cities with more than 50,000 residents. The purpose of the boards was to dispense state funds to licensed providers of mental healthcare. While the Northside Center, which worked with black children, received $72,000 (equivalent to $337,722 in 2017) in funding, the Lafargue Clinic was rejected for funds by both the city and state. According to Gabriel Mendes, author of Under The Strain of Color: Harlem's Lafargue Clinic and the Promise of an Antiracist Psychiatry, Lafargue was a good fit for the intended developments of the Community Mental Health Services Act, but Wertham's reputation as a "self-important nuisance" as well as his challenging of psychiatric orthodoxy turned the psychiatric establishment's favor away from Lafargue and led the clinic to not receive funds.

In addition, Rev. Bishop, who had initially granted the clinic its space and was one of its strongest supporters, retired from the ministry in 1957. His replacement, a Columbia University graduate named M. Moran Weston, turned the parish house into a center for community services and health programs headed by members of the St. Philip's congregation. Said Mendes, "Weston's health initiative was not a slight directed at Wertham and the Lafargue Clinic. Rather it reflected a changing of the guard and perhaps the desire to place the health needs of the central Harlem community in the hands of black professionals." Without their strongest advocate and with the loss of their primary funding (outside donations that Rev. Bishop played a strong role in soliciting), the clinic's closing grew inevitable.

Due to the change in leadership at St. Philip's and the deaths and illnesses of several clinic staffers, the clinic held its last session on November 1, 1958. Over the clinic's thirteen-year history, it served 1,389 patients.

== Legacy ==
=== Wertham and comic books ===
Though Wertham was instrumental in the advocacy, foundation, and operation of the Lafargue Clinic, he remains known for his alarmist condemnations of comic books. Best typified by his 1954 book Seduction of the Innocent, which claimed that comics were pathological and negative influences on children, many of Wertham's case studies and anecdotal references came from his time at Lafargue and at Queens General Hospital. In a 1949 article for Saturday Review of Literature titled "The Comics...Very Funny!", Wertham referenced five cases of juvenile delinquents that he worked with at Lafargue as a way of proving the malevolent influence of comic books.

Wertham and several children in a playroom therapy session

=== Dismantling school segregation ===
In the early 1950s, the NAACP Legal Defense and Educational Fund (LDEF) began to seek more authoritative scientific evidence that Jim Crow schools were detrimental to black children. Columbia Law graduate Jack Greenberg, who joined the LDEF in 1949, brought the idea of pursuing social scientist testimony to fellow lawyers and supervisors at the LDEF, believing that their work would greatly improve their chances of challenging school segregation. The LDEF successfully challenged segregation in higher education in Sweatt v. Painter and McLaurin v. Oklahoma State Regents, but now looked towards overturning the doctrine of separate but equal, which was still in effect from Plessy v. Ferguson. The case that the LDEF sought help from Lafargue staff on was Belton v. Gebhart, which along with its consolidated case Bulah v. Gebhart became one of the five cases combined into the review of Brown v. Board of Education.

Worried that conservative courts would reject the doll tests of black psychologists Kenneth and Mamie Clark, Greenberg sought more definitive proof of the debilitating effect Jim Crow segregation had on black children, and invited Wertham to testify on the NAACP's behalf. In a later book, Greenberg credited Wertham's testimony for Belton v. Gebhart as "[making] segregation a public health issue". After examining a cadre of Delaware children, both black and white, Wertham testified,

"Segregation in schools legally decreed by statute, as in the State of Delaware, interferes with the healthy development of children. It doesn't necessarily cause an emotional disorder in every child. I compare that with the disease of tuberculosis. In New York thousands of people have the tubercle bacilli in their lungs—hundreds of thousands—and they don't get tuberculosis. But they do have the germ of illness in them at one time or another, and the fact that hundreds of them don't develop tuberculosis doesn't make me say, 'never mind the tubercle bacillus; it doesn't harm people, so let it go'".

— Fredric Wertham

Judge Collins J. Seitz was deeply moved by Wertham's testimony, and though he did not rule segregation unconstitutional, he effectively struck down Delaware's segregation laws and ordered the integration of the state's schools. After the conclusion of Brown v. Board, Thurgood Marshall wrote to Wertham to thank him for his testimony in the Delaware cases and impress upon Wertham the gravity of his testimony: "...for the important assistance which you gave us in the school segregation cases which were recently decided by the Supreme Court of the United States. . .Not only was your testimony in the Delaware case before the Court in the printed record of testimony, but the Chancellor in Delaware came to his conclusions concerning the effects of segregation largely upon the basis of your testimony and the work done in your clinic."

Over time, Wertham grew jaded with how the nation recalled the testimony that led to the dissolution of Jim Crow, feeling that too much attention was paid to the Clark doll tests, rather than the Lafargue Clinic's clinical studies, saying "[The Brown v. Board decision] was not based on primitive insignificant dolls play, but on careful lifelike clinical studies by the Lafargue Clinic's group of black and white psychiatrists, psychologists, teachers and social workers".

=== Response from historians ===
Medical historian Dennis Doyle wrote favorably of the clinic, that it resulted from a "complex interaction" of community persons, Harlem leaders, and progressive psychiatrists. Doyle also lauded the clinic's ability to respond to both the social and medical needs of patients from troubled Harlem neighborhoods.

Gabriel Mendes, author of the most comprehensive book-length treatment of the clinic, noted that the system that Wertham and his colleagues devised at Lafargue built a framework for addressing social ills and that its work, and through its linkage of race and class to mental health issues, went further than any other mental institution at its time in addressing these issues. "The Lafargue Clinic," wrote Mendes, "became a key site in the battle for the desegregation of American society."
