= Nights of Horror =

Fetish comic book series

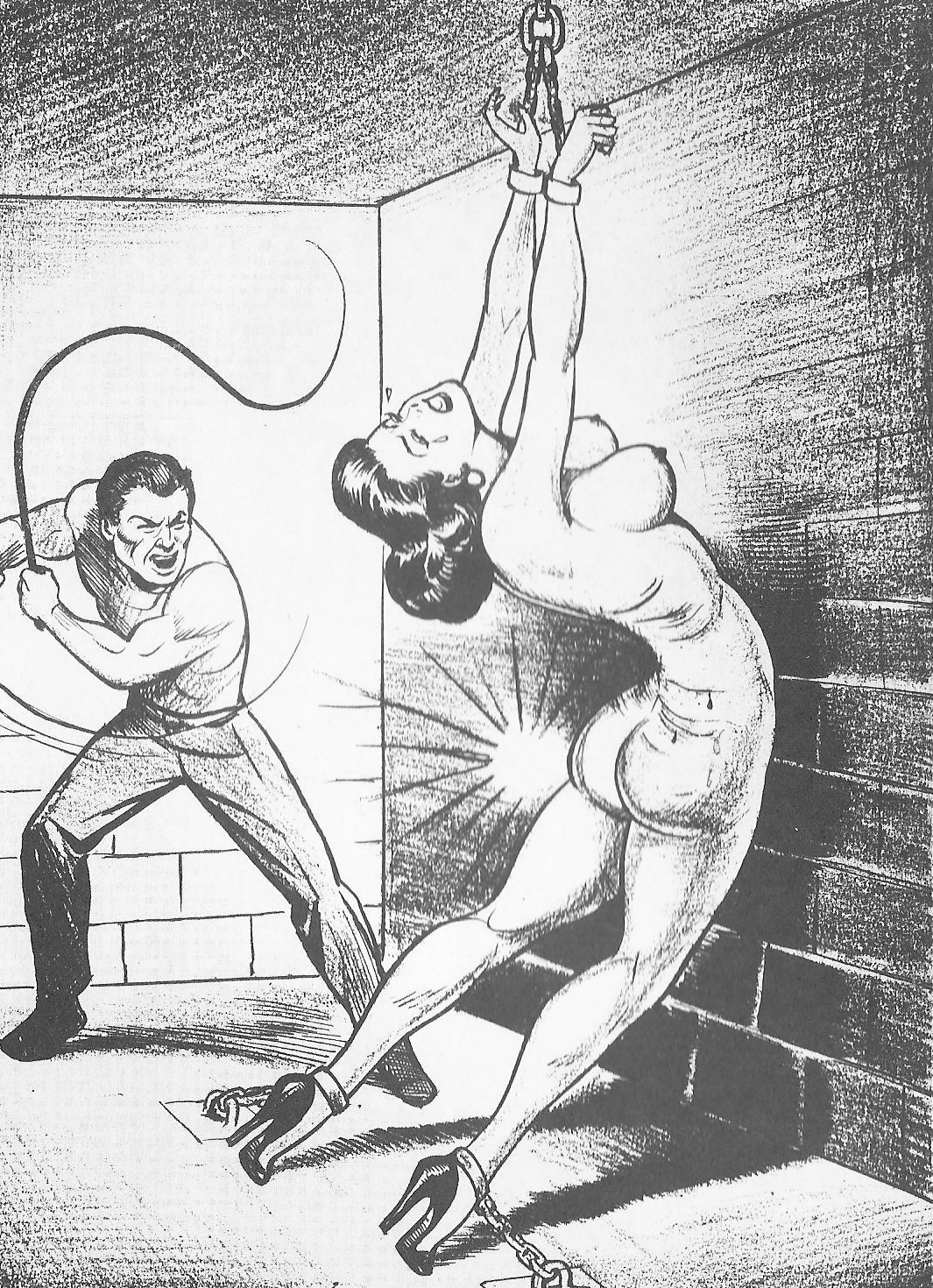
- A scene from the comic

Publication information
- Publisher: Malcla
- Genre: Erotic comic
- Publication date: 1954

Creative team
- Written by: "Clancy"
- Artist: Joe Shuster

Nights of Horror is an American series of fetish comic books, created in 1954 by publisher Malcla, drawn by comic artist Joe Shuster, who is also one of the original creators of Superman. The comic stories were written by an author under the pseudonym Clancy, who also used other pseudonyms for different issues of the books. The stories are based on situations of BDSM, bondage, torture, and sexual slavery, featuring both men and women as the tormentors and victims.

The series was important in the conviction of Jack Koslow in 1954, during the trial of the Brooklyn Thrill Killers. The books themselves were seized and banned first by New York City, then by the State of New York for violating obscenity laws, and the case went to the Supreme Court of the United States. The Court determined that the ban was not in violation of First Amendment rights, and upheld New York's request for destroying copies of Nights of Horror. Shuster was never named as the illustrator until Gerard Jones published the information in 2004.

== Background ==
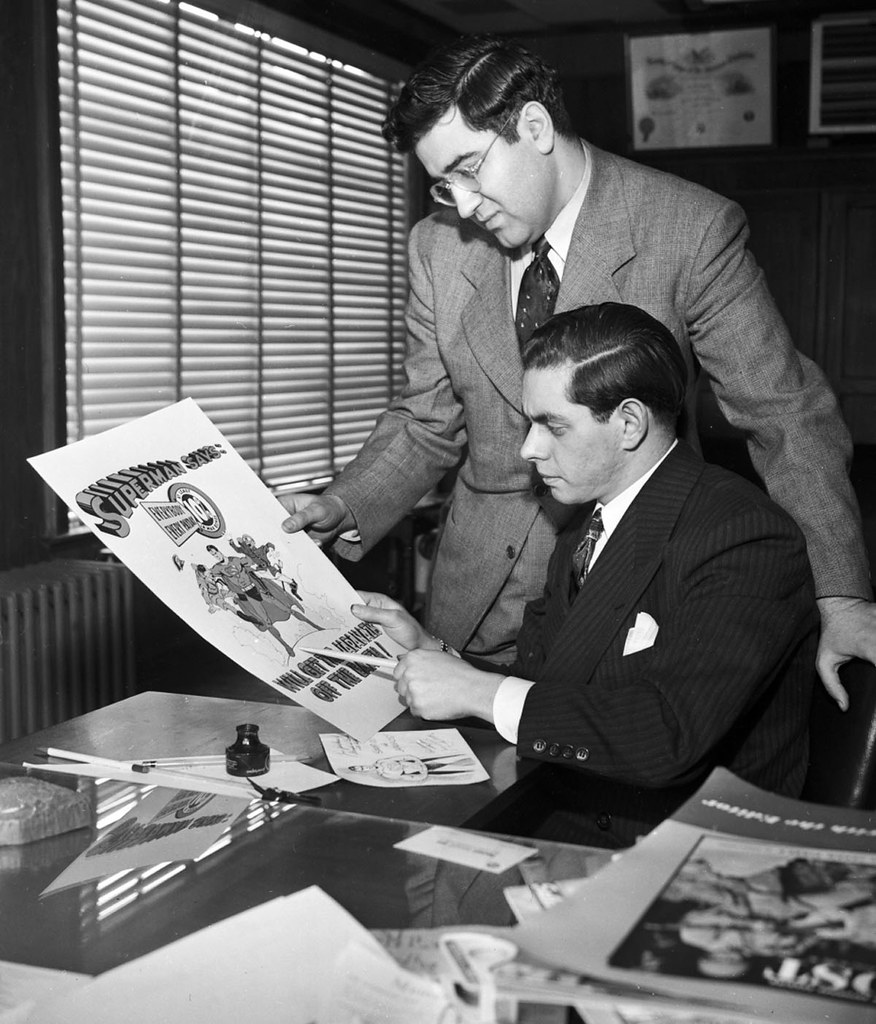
Joe Shuster (seated) with Jerry Siegel in 1942

Joe Shuster began creating comic art and stories with his friend, Jerry Siegel, in the early 1930s, after becoming friends in high school. Shuster and Siegel first drew the story of Superman in a hand typed fanzine for their school, called Science Fiction. Superman, the secret identity of Clark Kent, represented an ideal of the American man to Shuster and Siegel, with his muscular, bulletproof physique, foreign origins, and goals of helping to save America and the world from destruction. Both men were from Jewish immigrant families, and both were self-described as quiet and meek, so creating a superhero that was strong, confident and popular with women over was a way for them to explore their own ideal selves in print.

It was difficult to break into the comic world, but eventually, the two men found a publisher in National Allied Publications (later DC Comics), who wanted to create a book series called Action Comics. The editor, Harry Donenfeld, paid Shuster and Siegel $130 for the first story, and purchased the rights to Superman. Action Comics published its first issue in June 1938, to much success, beginning the industry of Superman. Shuster and Siegel were paid less than what Donenfeld and DC earned from the success of Superman, though it differed between 50 and 90 percent per strip. Shuster also had weakening eyesight, making the work of drawing multiple comics difficult. After almost 10 years of drawing Superman for DC, with a want for more control over their work, and the stirrings of a moral war against comic books coming from senators, religious leaders and a children's psychiatrist named Dr. Fredric Wertham, Shuster and Siegel decided to sue DC for the rights to Superman and a less popular character called Superboy. In the 1948 trial, the artists were awarded the rights to Superboy, but DC Comics would retain the rights to Superman, under the ruling that the original payment of $130 made the character a "work-for-hire proposition". Seigel and Shuster were devastated by the loss, which left them jobless and almost broke. A second attempt at creating an iconic superhero, called Funnyman, failed after only three issues.

== Nights of Horror ==
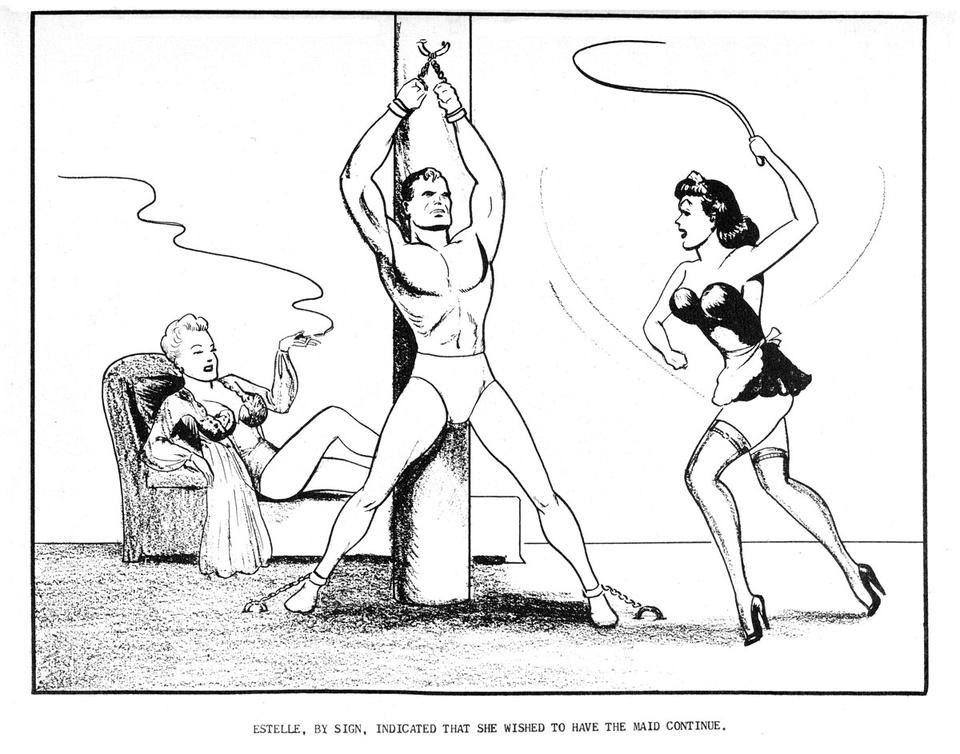
Nights of Horror is noted for including characters that visually resemble Shuster's Superman characters.

Broke and slowly going blind, Shuster took a project from his neighbor, a writer for a publishing company called Malcla. His neighbor "Clancy" was the "Cla" in the name, and the "Mal" was Eugene Maletta, who ran a print shop out of a basement in Queens. The project involved drawing the art for Malcla's new publication called Nights of Horror, a comic series based on tales of BDSM, kidnapping and torture. The series features images of men and women in scenes of humiliation, foot worship, bloodletting, bondage, flagellation, lesbianism, lingerie fetishism and interracial sex, though it has little nudity, and only in the case of women's exposed breasts. Both men and women are drawn in the positions of torturers and victims.

The booklet lasted for 16 issues, with Clancy penning them all under pseudonyms. Shuster never signed any of his illustrations, but the work is universally attributed to him, especially when compared to his work on Superman. Some of the characters in Nights of Horror even look like Shuster's Superman character drawings, such as Lois Lane, Lex Luthor, Jimmy Olsen, even Clark Kent. It is unknown whether or not Shuster did the work just for the money, or even as retribution for losing the rights of Superman to DC, but in his book Secret Identity: The Fetish Art of Superman's Co-Creator Joe Shuster, Craig Yoe speculates that it most likely was because Shuster was in a dire situation financially, and the character similarities are simply reflective of his drawing style. Shuster never told anyone about his work on Nights of Horror, and therefore never received any notoriety for it until the discovery of a rare remaining copy of the booklet by Craig Yoe.

=== The Brooklyn Thrill Kill Gang ===
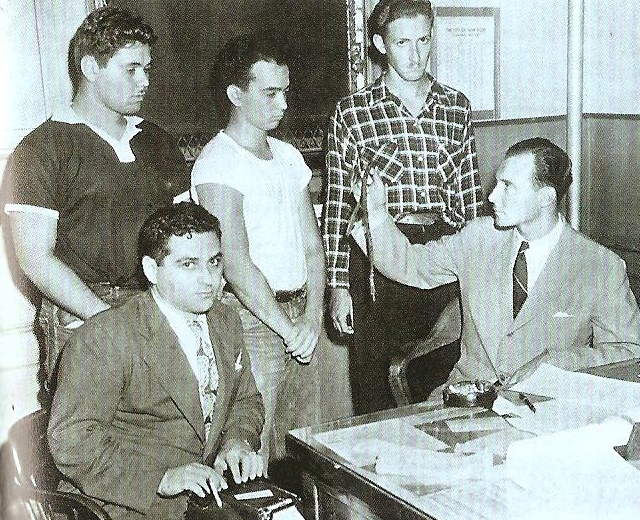
Three of the Brooklyn Thrill Killers standing before the district attorney, who holds up the bullwhip used in one of the attacks

Nights of Horror would play a role in an infamous murder trial and be a part of the arguments regarding obscenity laws in the United States. In the summer of 1954, Jack Koslow (18), Melvin "Mel" Mittman (17), Robert "Bobby" Trachtenberg (15), and Jerome "Jerry" Lieberman (17) roamed Brooklyn, terrorized girls with whips they had ordered out of magazines, beat vagrants, and set them on fire. The four teens eventually beat an old man to death, and were caught and arrested soon after forcing a man off of a pier into the East River to drown. It seemed to the people of Brooklyn and the press that this was senseless violence, since they never robbed any of their victims, and they were nicknamed the "Brooklyn Thrill Killers". The teens were brought to a jury trial in November 1954; Trachtenberg's case was dismissed as he decided to be the state's witness against the others, and Leiberman's case was dismissed as there was a lack of evidence that he had participated in the murder. Koslow and Mittman were given life without possibility of parole.

When Jack Koslow was being examined by psychiatrist Dr. Fredric Wertham to see if he was fit to stand for trial, Wertham discovered Koslow's fascination with violent comics. The whips the boys carried were obtained from ads in the back of either Uncanny Tales, or Journey into Mystery; Koslow couldn't remember which. He had discovered Nights of Horror, and this led him to explore his violent sexual fantasies by engaging in the beatings and whippings around Brooklyn. When Wertham brought a copy to Koslow's cell to ask him about his fascinations, Jack confirmed that it was what he had read. He even admitted that he gained sexual pleasures from reading the booklets and from enacting several of the scenes during their crime spree by making some of the vagrants beg and kiss their feet while being beaten. This was used as part of the evidence to convict Koslow of his crimes.

== Obscenity trial ==
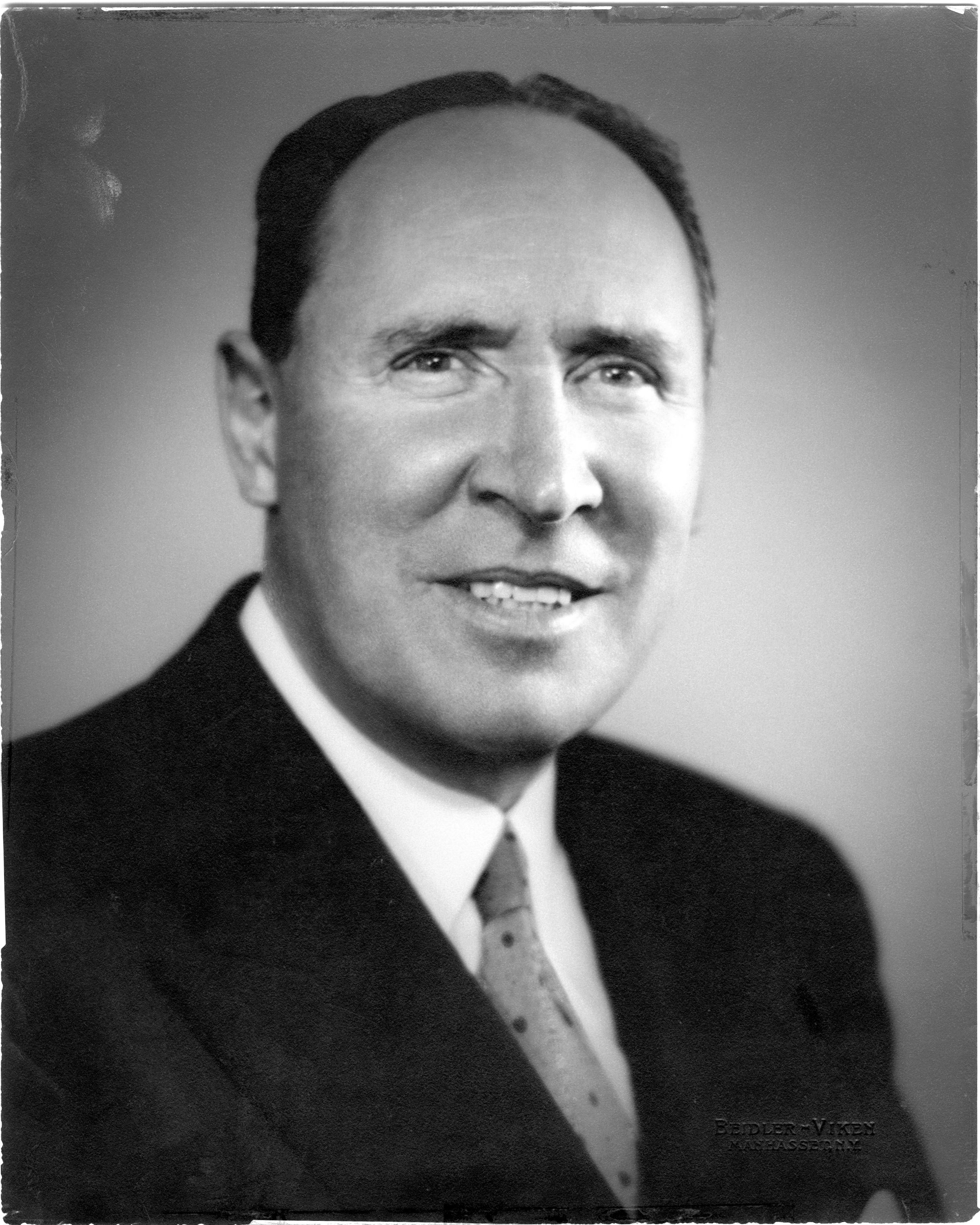
Adrian P. Burke obtained a court order on September 11, 1954, to restrain five bookshops from distributing Nights of Horror.

Dr. Wertham had previously spoken out about the dangers of comic books in his 1954 book Seduction of the Innocent, specifically attacking some of Joe Shuster's previous work in Superman. He stated "We have established the basic ingredients of the most numerous and widely read comic books: violence, sadism, and cruelty". Unbeknownst to him, Shuster also drew the book that Wertham would launch an obscenity attack against. Wertham presented to the court that Jack Koslow had "fancied himself a Superman...became steeped in horror comics, his mind becoming filled with all the thrill of violence, murder, and cruelty described in them". Wertham presented a chart comparing the activities of the Thrill Killers to the scenes in Nights of Horror, and asked that the law ban all types of literature like Nights of Horror, for the sake of the safety of children. On September 10, 1954, the Corporation Council of New York, out of the mayor's office, filed a court motion asking for an injunction to ban the sale of Nights of Horror. The police commissioner of the City of New York stated "It is the informed opinion of those police officials that there is a definite relationship between the types of crime portrayed in Nights of Horror and similar works, and the crimes of sex and violence which beset the City of New York today".

The booklets were blamed for a series of juvenile violence crime going back to June 1954, when they were first published. Corporation Counsel Adrian P. Burke obtained a court order on September 11, 1954, to restrain five bookshops in Times Square from distributing or selling the books: Kingsley Books Inc, Metropolitan Books, Time Square Bookshop, Pelley Bookshop, and Publishers Outlet. All of the sellers had to surrender their copies of the books for disposal. Kingsley Books and Time Square Bookshop appealed to the New York State Court in 1955, arguing that banning the book was a violation of their First Amendment rights. Judge Matthew M. Levy stated "The booklets in evidence offer naught but glorified concepts of lustful and vicious concupiscence, and by their tenor deride love and virtue, invite crime and voluptuousness, and excite lecherous desires", and that they were strictly pornography, which fell under then-current obscenity standards. He argued "In short, the volumes of Nights of Horror in evidence before me are obscene and constitute pornography — 'dirt for dirt's sake'". Though he said it was not the court's job to become a censor or "book burner", he had to uphold the judicial responsibility of concern for safety, and upheld the ban of the publication, distribution, and sale of the book, as well as the seizure of all copies for destruction.

== Kingsley Books, Inc v. Brown ==
Kingsley Books appealed the case all the way to the United States Supreme Court. The case was argued on April 22, 1957, and judgement was handed down on June 24, 1957. In a close five to four decision, the Court ruled to uphold the ban on the sale and distribution of Nights of Horror, on the basis that "nothing in the Due Process Clause of the Fourteenth Amendment restricts a state to the criminal process in seeking to protect its people from the dissemination of pornography". Justice Felix Frankfurter delivered the opinion of the court, stating that the Court affirmed the decision based on the fact that a state court may decide to ban the distribution or sale of a publication considered obscene, for the protection of the people, and that the state may also criminally punish the distributors or sellers of the material if they fail to comply with the law. Justice Frankfurter stated "It is not for this Court thus to limit the State in resorting to various weapons in the armory of the law... If New York chooses to subject persons who disseminate obscene "literature" to criminal prosecution and also to deal with such books as deodands of old, or both, with due regard, of course, to appropriate opportunities for the trial of the underlying issue, it is not for us to gainsay its selection of remedies".

Not all of the justices agreed with the decision. Chief Justice Earl Warren stated "It is the manner of use that should determine obscenity. It is the conduct of the individual that should be judged, not the quality of art or literature. To do otherwise is to impose a prior restraint, and hence to violate the Constitution. Certainly, in the absence of a prior judicial determination of illegal use, books, pictures and other objects of expression should not be destroyed. It savors too much of book burning". Justice William Douglas added "We tread here on First Amendment grounds. And nothing is more devastating to the rights that it guarantees than the power to restrain publication before even a hearing is held. This is prior restraint, and censorship at its worst." Despite these dissenting opinions, all copies of Nights of Horror were ordered to be surrendered for destruction.

== Legacy ==
After the ban on Nights of Horror, some remaining stories and drawings were published under different titles such as Hollywood Detective and Rod Rule. Some of the remaining books were recovered under titles like Pink Chemise and Black Chemise. Shuster, not indicted or even named in the trials, continued to create art, even for other pornographic periodicals such as Continental. A few rare copies of Nights of Horror remained in private collections. In his 2009 book Secret Identity: The Fetish Art of Superman's Co-Creator Joe Shuster, Craig Yoe recounts how he stumbled upon one of the copies in "a dusty old cardboard box in a used bookseller's stall" and immediately recognized it for being Shuster's work. Yoe's book features art and stories from all sixteen issues of Nights of Horror, and art from Hollywood Detective, Rod Rule, and Continental magazine. It also goes into detail on the story behind Nights of Horror, from Shuster's beginnings, to drawing the booklets, to the subsequent trials for the book and those involved. Gerard Jones had previously named Shuster as the illustrator in 2004. The book also includes a foreword from Stan Lee, who was a friend of Jerry Siegel's, but never met Shuster, though he greatly admired his work.

Nights of Horror is an example of the sweeping censorship that took place during the 1950s in the United States. Comics became the scapegoat for juvenile delinquency in America. In September 1954, amidst the trial for the Brooklyn Thrill Killers Gang and the injunction against Nights of Horror, the Comics Magazine Association of America capitulated to media and public pressure and asked Charles Murphy to head the organization and oversee self-censorship of comic book publishers. This led to the creation of the Comics Code Authority, which lasted until around 2011. Stores would refuse to sell comics that didn't have the seal of approval on their cover.
