= Funnyman (comics) =

American comic book series

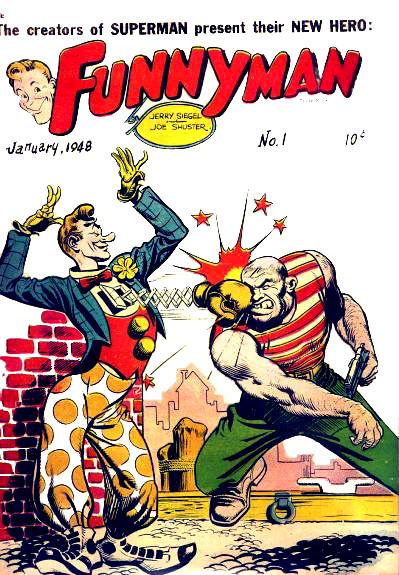
- Funnyman #1 (Jan. 1948). Cover art by Joe Shuster.

Publication information
- Publisher: Magazine Enterprises
- First appearance: Funnyman #1 (Jan. 1948)
- Created by: Jerry Siegel (writer); Joe Shuster (artist)

In-story information
- Alter ego: Larry Davis
- Partnerships: June Farrell; Happy; Sgt. Harrigan
- Notable aliases: Comic Crimebuster

Funnyman is a 1948 American comic book series written by Jerry Siegel and illustrated by Joe Shuster. It was published by Magazine Enterprises.

== Publication history ==
After leaving DC Comics and suing that company in a dispute over the rights to their character Superman, Jerry Siegel and Joe Shuster rejoined their former DC editor Vin Sullivan — who had edited the earliest Superman adventures — at his new company, Magazine Enterprises. Siegel and Shuster's new creation, Funnyman, starred in a series that ran six issues from January to August 1948. In writing the comic, Siegel took inspiration from the comedian Danny Kaye.

In the first issue, Siegel and Shuster mocked what they saw as the rush of Superman clones in a story called "Funman, Comicman and Laffman". In the story, TV comedian Larry Davis dresses up in a costume to catch a fake criminal for a publicity stunt, but he catches a real criminal instead, and decides to become a superhero. Funnyman's enemies include Doc Gimmick, a criminal robot, and the crime team of Schemer Beamer, Bug-Eyes, Crusher, Rockjaw and the Curve. Also present in the Funnyman series are a sidekick named Funnyboy and a secret base called Funnymanor. The comic only ran for six issues. A newspaper comic strip debuted in October 1948, but Funnyman also failed to find an audience in this format, and the strip was soon dropped.

After the failure of Funnyman, Jerry Siegel returned to DC as a writer-for-hire. Joe Shuster was unable to find regular work as an illustrator after Funnyman because of a severe case of macular degeneration. One of Shuster's later projects was an erotic comic series called Nights of Horror.
