= Alan Class Comics =

Defunct British comic book publisher

Alan Class and Co. Ltd
- Founded: 1959; 67 years ago
- Founder: Alan Class
- Defunct: April 1989; 37 years ago
- Country of origin: England
- Headquarters location: London
- Publication types: Comics anthology reprints of U.S. comic books from the 1940s–1960s
- Fiction genres: Science fiction, horror, crime, superhero

Alan Class Comics was a British comics publishing company that operated between 1959 and 1989. The company produced anthology titles, reprinting comics stories from many U.S. publishers of the 1940s to 1960s in a black and white digest size format for a UK audience. During the 1960s and 1970s, these reprints were the main medium through which British children were introduced to American monster and mystery comics, as well as most non-DC or Marvel superheroes.

The various Alan Class titles contained reprints of stories originally from such U.S. comics publishers as Timely, Atlas (and their later incarnation, Marvel Comics) American Comics Group (ACG), Charlton Comics, Archie Comics (and their Red Circle Comics and MLJ imprints), Fawcett Comics, Lev Gleason Publications, and Sterling Comics, as well as King Features comics and newspaper strips. Included in these reprints were many early mystery, superhero, and monster stories by artists such as Steve Ditko and Jack Kirby that are now regarded as classics of the 1950s and early 1960s.

Although Alan Class put out more than 25 titles in all, the company's six core titles — Astounding Stories, Creepy Worlds, Secrets of the Unknown, Sinister Tales, Suspense Stories, and Uncanny Tales — lasted almost the entire publishing history of the company.

== History ==
Alan Class (born in London, England, 21 July 1937) began as an importer of remaindered copies of American movie, romance, and detective magazines for UK distribution. (After World War II, the U.K. was intent on promoting homegrown publishers, and thus banned the direct importation of American periodicals.)

To avoid the cost, supply, and importation difficulties he had encountered, in 1958 Class set up a publishing business, Alan Class and Co. Ltd, to produce his own magazines, and entered into an agreement with an American comic and comic strip syndication company for the rights to reproduce U.S. comic books and strips under their control for a U.K audience. (Coincidentally, in 1959, the U.K. lifted the previous ban on importing foreign publications.)

The company's first offering was the one-shot Race for the Moon (1959), anthologizing Harvey science fiction reprints. Other one-shots and short series followed, and in the summer of 1962, the first of the Alan Class core titles, Creepy Worlds debuted; followed shortly thereafter by the debut of another long-running title, Secrets of the Unknown. Core titles Suspense Stories and Uncanny Tales debuted in 1963, Sinister Tales in 1964, and finally Astounding Stories in 1966.

In 1963, Alan Class bought the inventory of L. Miller & Son, Ltd., a UK publisher since the 1940s that had also reprinted many U.S. comics in black-and-white format. This purchase included the asbestos printing plates from which Miller had produced their comics. However, it is unclear what inventory titles this gave Alan Class. Many of the companies that Miller had published material from, such as Charlton and Fawcett, had already been reprinted by Class; and most of the Fawcett superhero material in which Miller had specialized — Captain Marvel, Captain Marvel Jr. and the rest of the Marvel Family especially — were not reprinted as a result of the long-running legal case between National/D.C. and Fawcett over Captain Marvel.

Alan Class Comics lost the right to its leased Marvel Comics characters after 1966, when Odhams Press began publishing its Power Comics line in January 1967, and licensed the Marvel Comics superheroes for their own titles. There was some overlap, with both companies reprinting Marvel superhero stories for some time. The available reprint material was reduced even further when, sometime between 1968 and 1971, King Features Syndicate sued Alan Class over publishing rights to its titles and characters, including The Phantom. As a result of this diminution of the accessible stories, by the early 1970s the Alan Class titles began to issue more and more reprints of material already printed in earlier issues.

=== Demise and legacy ===
By the late 1980s, slow sales and distribution problems, combined with the rise of the specialist comic shop and the decline of newsagent purchases, together with the easy availability of new U.S. comics and back issues, signaled the end of the line for the business. As Class himself said, "The reality was ... costs were escalating, sales were falling — Marvels were on everybody's wish-list, and my comics were at 55p which I didn’t feel could be increased — enough was enough!"

Alan Class Comics shut down in 1989. During 30 years of publishing, the company produced 26 black-and-white anthology reprint titles comprising 1,472 individual issues (plus four issues of the Ally Sloper comic magazine).

On 15 May 2005, 30th Century Comics in London announced that it had obtained the rights to sell Alan Class's personal collection, including the original printing plates for the comics range.

== Overview ==
=== Format and price ===
Alan Class Comics began as 68-page titles, containing a mix of stories reproduced in black and white with colour covers, and selling for 1 shilling. Each issue measured 235mm × 185mm (9 1/4" × 7 1/4"), slightly wider than the original American versions, allowing for all of the original cover art to be seen (which was cut in the originals).

By the late 1960s, the company's standard 68-page format began to vary, with page counts ranging from 48 to 100 pages, and cover prices from 10p to 55p, with the company's six long-running titles settling for a while at 48 pages for 25p, before continuing an inexorable upward increase in price to 55p in the 1980s.

==== Covers ====
Across Alan Class Comics titles, the cover art ranged from only slightly adapted versions of the original comics from which the stories came to new covers, many produced from adapted pages or panels within the stories or pasted-up montages of various panels. Many of these covers were originally illustrated by classic comics artists of the time, especially Ditko and Kirby. Since the books were wider than the American originals, all the cover art was visible where American printings were cut-off. The reason for this was by the 1960s the width of American comics had shrunk, while artists continued to use the same size artboards. As a result, American covers from this era look cut-off while Alan Class covers didn't. Variations on these covers were often used more than once across the titles, as were the stories.

==== Issue dating (or lack thereof) ====
To complicate things further, none of the Alan Class Comics line had anything to identify their date of issue on the cover, (or inside the comic in many cases), and many were not even numbered. This was a deliberate company policy to extend the shelf life of the titles: Alan Class Comics often remained on the racks longer than dated issues from other companies. Additionally, it led Alan Class to devise a system to maximize profits: warehouse stocks of unsold comics were returned to him; these were later re-issued over a number of years' summer seasons to capture the market for reading material during the summer holidays. As Class said in an interview:

"Every copy was of value to me, and some wholesale houses wanted to 'shred' unsold copies. I insisted that all unsold copies were returned back to me complete ... because during the summer period, May–September, a new market would become available. Beach and coastal resorts were thronged with thousands of holidaymakers with their children, who at certain times had to be kept quiet and happy, and what better way than to read a comic."

=== Superheroes ===
As well as monster, horror and mystery story reprints, many Alan Class comics featured superheroes. Early Marvel Comics tales of Fantastic Four and The Amazing Spider-Man by Jack Kirby and Steve Ditko respectively, Giant-Man, Ant-Man and The Wasp, the Human Torch, S.H.I.E.L.D. by Jim Steranko, odd issues of Iron Man, X-Men, Captain America and Doctor Strange were published in random order with no regard to continuity — any references to next issue's story in the original run were often covered over before printing, and there was no guarantee that any character would appear in consecutive issues of a title, or even in the same title. (One of the few exceptions to this was when Alans Class' Creepy Worlds #32-38 reprinted nearly the first Fantastic Four stories in sequence, missing only #7).

Archie/Radio Comics' characters Jaguar, The Fly and Mighty Crusaders; Charlton's Captain Atom and Judomaster; ACG's Magicman and Nemesis; King Features' Flash Gordon by Reed Crandall, "The Phantom" and Mandrake the Magician, among others, also appeared on a random basis across many titles. Golden Age superheroes such as Novelty Press's Blue Bolt and the 1940s Timely Captain America and Human Torch tales were similarly treated. Only characters published by National Comics (now DC Comics) were unrepresented, as the syndicated merchandising deal did not include them.

The balance of each comic was made up of short stories from other comic book titles and the occasional text story. Superheroes did not necessarily get cover billing in any issue — they were treated with the same importance as any other story.

=== Short-run/one-off issues ===
A number of Alan Class titles were un-numbered short-run or one-off issues. These were experimental titles testing the market for different genres, such as romance (My Secret Confessions, which anthologised American Comics Group love story reprints, and Uncensored Love), war titles (Journey Into Danger #1-8, reprinting Atlas war stories, and two issues of Tales Of Action), and westerns (three issues of Blazing Trails featuring Charlton and Fawcett western stories, and one issue of Hell-Fire Raiders (1966) reprinting Fawcett Tom Mix, Tex Ritter and Lash LaRue stories). None of these went on to become longer-running titles; Alan Class would later say of the whole line, "Only the suspense/space stories stood the test of time."

Class also issued several short-run titles in the humour and crime genres. There were five issues of Just Dennis (1965), with reprints of the American version of Dennis the Menace together with Atomic Mouse and Atom the Cat reprints (the series was not titled Dennis the Menace to avoid copyright issues with DC Thomson's British Dennis the Menace character), and two issues of Super Mouse featuring Charlton humour reprints. Alan Class' one attempt at a crime comics — Tales of the Underworld, featuring Charlton and Fawcett crime stories — only lasted 10 issues.

=== Science fiction ===
Although many of the reprints scattered across the successful anthologies were science-fiction stories, titles themed solely on science fiction were comparative failures. Class tried first with one issue of Race for the Moon (1959), anthologising Harvey science fiction reprints, followed by Outer Space (1961), featuring mainly Charlton reprints, which ran only 10 issues, and Race Into Space the same year, which again only lasted one issue. The same year Class published probably the only science fiction title that was a deliberate one-off — Space Adventures Presents Space Trip To The Moon (1961), which was mainly a reprint of Fawcett's 1950 one-shot Destination Moon, itself an adaptation of the 1950 film of the same name with short story fillers. It is possible that this was part of Class's license for the Charlton inventory, as that company had reprinted the tale in Space Adventures #20 (March 1956). Later in the 1960s, the science fiction title Out of This World ran for two separate series, the first run of 23 issues — advertised as a "new Mystery Space series" — mainly reprinting Charlton stories (including the "Tales of the Mysterious Traveler" by Steve Ditko), and a 10-issue run in the 1970s.

=== Ally Sloper ===
The list of Alan Class Comics titles in themselves did not directly reflect that Class himself was interested in comics above and beyond his publishing them. However, in late 1976/early 1977, Alan Class published four issues of Ally Sloper, a monthly magazine in a totally different style from other Alan Class publications.

Edited by comics historian Denis Gifford and named after one of the earliest comic characters, Ally Sloper demonstrated great affection for old British comics, comic strips, and artists. With the cover tagline, "First British comic hero 1867, First British comic magazine 1976," Ally Sloper contained an eclectic mix of strips and articles. Some were in the style of British comic strips from the early 20th century, while others were created by classic artists such as Frank Hampson's "Dawn O'Dare" and Frank Bellamy, who provided Swade, a three-page black-and-white wordless western story, for issue #1 (his last work as he died before completing the second strip). Also featured were newer British artists such as Kevin O'Neill (issue #2) and Hunt Emerson (issue #4).

Although the Alley Sloper comic magazine was critically acclaimed by the fan press, it suffered from poor distribution and insufficient public interest, and the title disappeared from the market after only four issues.

== Titles published ==
Most Alan Class comics were undated, and many un-numbered. (Note: A definitive catalog of the contents of each issue has never been published. 30th Century Comics website has probably the most complete information publicly available on Alan Class Comics contents.) The following is a list of the Alan Class titles, with dates of first publication when known:

=== Core titles ===
- Astounding Stories – #1–195 plus 3 'S' issues (February 1966–April 1989)
- Creepy Worlds – #1–249 plus 3 'S' issues (August 1962–April 1989)
- Secrets of the Unknown – #1–-249 plus 3 'S' issues (October 1962–March 1989)
- Sinister Tales – #1–227 plus 2 'S' issues (January 1964–January 1989)
- Suspense Stories – #1–241 plus 3 'S' issues (May 1963–March 1989)
- Uncanny Tales – #1–187 plus 2 'S' issues, and 1 issue with no indicator (May 1963–c. 1989)

=== Other titles ===
- Ally Sloper #1-4 (October 1976–January 1977) — mix of articles and comics on classic British strips
- Amazing Stories – 2 issues (mid-1960s) — Charlton and American Comics Group (ACG) science fiction comics
- Blazing Trails – #1-3 (mid-1960s) — Charlton and Fawcett western comics
- Journey Into Danger #1-8 (mid-1960s) — Atlas Comics war stories
- Just Dennis – 5 issues (mid-1960s) — Dennis the Menace, Atomic Mouse, and Atom the Cat
- Out of This World
  - series 1 #1-23 (June 1963–mid-1960s) — mainly Charlton science fiction stories
  - series 2 #1-10 (early 1980s) — science fiction
- Outer Space – 10 issues (1961?) — mainly Charlton science fiction stories
- Super Mouse – 2 issues (1960?) — Charlton humor comics
- Tales of Action – 2 issues (mid-1960s) — war comics
- Tales of the Underworld – #1-10 (1960) — Charlton and Fawcett crime comics
- Weird Planets – #1-23 (1962–1963) — Charlton and Marvel science fiction comics

=== One-shots and specials ===
- Astonishing Stories (1962?) — mainly ACG science fiction comics
- Blazing Frontiers (1965?) — Charlton western comics
- Eerie Tales (1962) — ACG and Charlton fantasy/horror comics
- Hell-Fire Raiders (1966) — mainly Charlton western comics
- My Secret Confessions (mid-1960s) — ACG romance comics
- Race for the Moon (1959) — Harvey science fiction comics
- Race Into Space (1961) — Charlton science fiction comics
- (Space Adventures Presents) Space Trip To The Moon (1961) — mainly a reprint of Fawcett's 1950 one-shot Destination Moon, with some Charlton science fiction backup stories
- Tales of the Supernatural (1964) — mainly ACG fantasy/horror comics
- Uncensored Love (mid-1960s) — ACG romance comics

== See also ==
- Arnold Book Company
- Thorpe & Porter
