= Benjamin W. Sangor =

American publisher (1889–1953)

- Born: Benjamin William Sangor; February 25, 1899 Russia
- Died: January 26, 1953 (aged 53)
- Area: Publisher
- Notable works: American Comics Group

Benjamin William Sangor (February 25, 1889 – January 26, 1953) was an American publisher best known for the 1940s to 1950s comic book company American Comics Group and for operating one of the earliest studios of comic-book writers and artists packaging comics for publishers entering the fledgling medium. He additionally was a real-estate entrepreneur.

== Biography ==
=== Early life and Pinewald ===
Benjamin W. Sangor was born in Russia and emigrated in 1904 to the United States, where he was naturalized an American citizen in 1914 and became an attorney. On October 1, 1925, a Benjamin Sanger (with an "e") married Etta Weidenfeld at the Hotel Martinique in Manhattan, New York City, though it is unclear if this is the same Sangor and if so, whether he had been married previously — since by 1940, his grown daughter Jacquelyn Sanger (as her last name is spelled in The New York Times) of Chicago had married pulp magazine publisher Ned Pines, founder of Standard Comics. At some point, Sangor had a wife named Francis.

An entrepreneur, Sangor established B.W. Sangor & Company by at least October 1925, when the concern issued stock to develop the resort community of Pinewald, New Jersey, on Barnegat Bay. This included the development of an 18-hole golf course and the Spanish Renaissance-style Royal Pine Hotel, built by the Sangor Hotel Corporation. About 8,000 lots were sold between 1928 and 1929. The firm was located at 1457 Broadway in Manhattan by at least September 1926, the year it began developing Pinewald — although "Help Wanted" classified ads that same month give a company address of 187 Joralemon Street in Brooklyn in relation to an event to help "German-speaking men and women interested in improving their money-making possibilities."

In January 1930, B.W. Sangor & Co. was sued in the Appellate Term of the New York Supreme Court over a claim that the company had breached state insurance law because of a clause giving the widow of a purchaser a clear deed. At some point during this Great Depression era, the company went bankrupt, and by June 1930, a Pinewald amphitheater was being planned for construction by George A. Raker & Co., whose company principal had been Sangor's general manager two years earlier.

In February 1935, previously quashed indictments were reinstated by the New Jersey Supreme Court against Sangor and Anthony M. Then — the chairman and president, respectively, of the Toms River Trust Company — charging embezzlement and larceny of $81,320 in securities. On November 2, the two were convicted after a three-week jury trial in Ocean County Common Pleas Court and each sentenced to one to three years in prison and a $1,000 fine. They appealed their convictions in 1936, and their sentences in 1937, but eventually surrendered themselves on January 31, 1938, to serve time at the state prison in Trenton, New Jersey. Sangor also was an organizer of the Prudence Bondholders Protective Association, which underwent bankruptcy reorganization in 1935.

=== Comics and the "Sangor Shop" ===
In 1930, before his legal travails, Sangor had begun a decade of publishing racy magazines for men. Afterward, through son-in-law Ned Pines, he entered comic books. Pulp-magazine publisher Pines had founded the imprint Standard Comics in 1939 in order to expand from pulps into the new medium. As Sangor's future business partner, Frederick Iger, recalled in a 1990s interview:

Ned Pines needed artwork. They were using it at a tremendous rate. And he casually mentioned to Sangor that he could use another source of art. And that gave Sangor an idea. He had some friends out in Hollywood [who] were associated at the time with the Fleischer Studios. He went out there and contacted a fellow by the name of Jim Davis ... [who] set up a studio, and Jim got hold of a lot of artists, and they started to produce [comics] material."

This was the beginning of what is colloquially referred to as the "Sangor Shop", a studio of writers and artists that, like other such "packagers" of the time, created comics on demand for publishers testing the fledgling medium. The corporate structure was divided into branches, including the Syndicated Features Corporation and the Editorial Art Syndicate. By now disbarred because of his convictions, Sangor saw his studio produce comic books and features for Pines' imprint Standard Comics and its subsidiaries Better Comics and Nedor Comics; and for National Comics, the primary company that would evolve into modern-day DC Comics.

Among the creative personnel at various times who produced content for the Sangor Shop were John Celardo, Dan Gordon, Graham Ingels, Jack Katz, Bob Oskner, and Art Saaf. Sangor closed the studio in 1948.

=== American Comics Group ===
Five years earlier, in 1943, Sangor had formed American Comics Group, with the editorial address 45 West 45th Street in Manhattan, to publish comics during the 1940s boom period known as the Golden Age of Comic Books. Harry Donenfeld — publisher of DC Comics precursor National Comics and a friend with whom he often played gin rummy — helped capitalize the new venture. Donenfeld's Independent News Distributors provided distribution to newsstands. ACG published via several imprints including Creston Publications and Michel Publications (both listed as at 420 DeSoto Ave., St. Louis 7, Missouri), and Best Syndicated Features (at the editorial address), before eventually using ACG as the umbrella brand sometime after the war. The editor was Gerald Albert through 1945, followed by Richard E. Hughes.

Sometime after returning from the U.S. Army in the 1940s, Donenfeld's son-in-law, Frederick Iger — no relation to fellow early comics pioneer Jerry Iger — invested with Sangor by forming the B & I Corporation, which published as an imprint of ACG. By at least 1947, B & I Publishing was producing comics including The Kilroys #1 (June 1947).

Sangor appeared before Senator Estes Kefauver's 1950-51 United States Senate Special Committee to Investigate Crime in Interstate Commerce, which among other topics looked into possible violations of postal law by crime comics publishers. "Perhaps leery of how much information he gave to the committee," wrote historian Michael Vance, "Sangor claimed that ACG was not a publisher at all, but rather an advertising representative for four different comic-book publishers: Creston, Michel, B & I, and Best Syndicated Features."

An October 1, 1952 "Statement of the Ownership, Management, and Circulation" published in ACG's Forbidden Worlds #15 gave that comic's publisher's name as "Preferred Publications, Inc., 8 Lord St., Buffalo, New York" and the owners as Preferred Publications and "B. W. Sangor, 7 West 81st Street, New York, N. Y." The editor was listed as "Richard E. Hughes, 120 West 183rd St., New York, N. Y." and the business manager as "Frederick H. Iger, 50 Beverly Road, Great Neck, Great Neck, L. I., N. Y."
