= Silver Screen (magazine) =

20th-century American film magazine

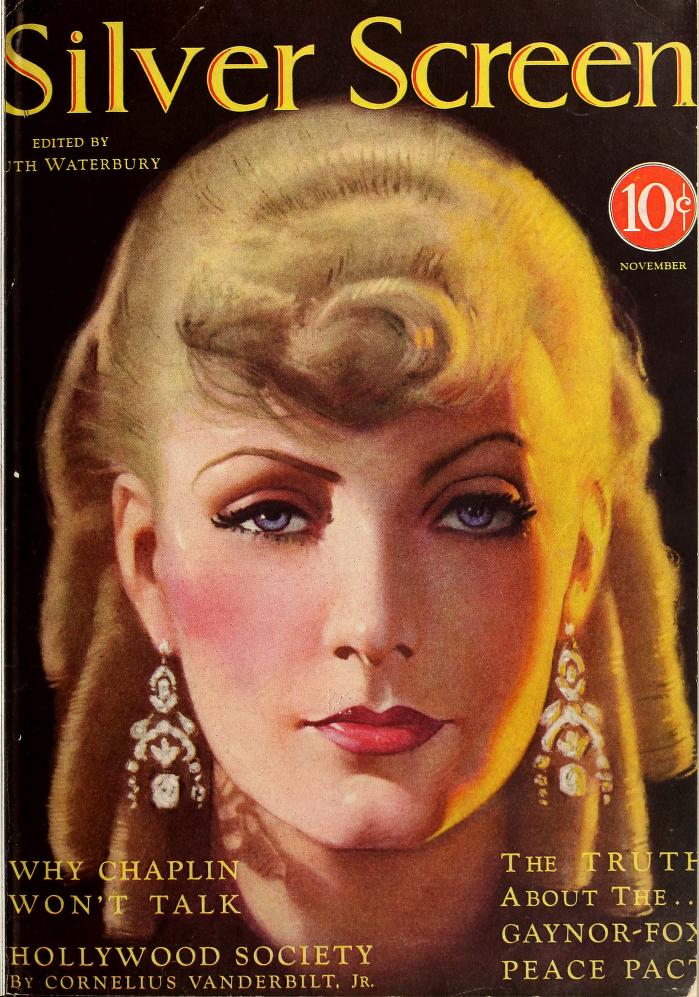
- Cover of the premiere edition of the magazine, November 1930, featuring a portrait of Greta Garbo
- Categories: Film; Entertainment
- First issue: November 1930
- Final issue: 1977
- Company: Screenland Magazine, Inc. Henry Publishing; Pines Publications (1952–1971)
- Country: United States
- Language: English
- ISSN: 0037-5365

Silver Screen was an American monthly magazine focusing on the film industry. It had its first publication in November 1930, and continued publication through the 1970s. It positioned itself as a source for behind-the-scenes stories about the stars of movie industry. The publication contained articles about film personalities, relationships, fashion and the film companies. It also contained reviews of the new releases in the film industry.

== History ==
The magazine began publication in November 1930, featuring a portrait of Greta Garbo on the cover. The publisher was Screenland Magazine, Inc., which also published Screenland, another monthly magazine about the film industry. The president of Screenland was Alfred A. Cohen, and the magazine's editor was Ruth Waterbury. The magazine fashioned itself as a behind-the-scenes look at Hollywood, focusing on the lives of the stars of the film industry.

By 1931 the magazine was claiming that it had the largest newsstand circulation of any publication dealing with the film industry. Eliot Keen, who had joined the magazine in 1930, took over the editor-in-chief duties for the September 1931 issue, a position he held until his death of a sudden heart attack in March 1939, although he remained on the masthead through the June 1939 issue. He was replaced by Lester C. Grady for the July issue. Their advertising slogan was "Reflecting the Magic of Hollywood."

In October 1952, Ned Pines' Standard Magazines, an imprint of Pines Publications, purchased Silver Screen and Screenland from the Henry Publishing company.

The magazine was published monthly until August 1954, when the magazine took a hiatus until February 1955, when it returned as a bi-monthly magazine. It remained bi-monthly through 1966, after which it returned to a monthly format. In 1965, in addition to the 6 regular issues, there were two additional special issuances, an "Annual" and a "Yearbook" edition. In 1971, Silver Screen merged with Screenland, but retained the Silver Screen title. It continued publishing through the beginning of 1977, when its final issue was a special "horror" issue.

== See also ==
- Photoplay
