= Richard E. Hughes =

American writer (1909–1974)

Richard E. Hughes (1909–1974) was an American writer and editor of comic books. He was editor of the American Comics Group through the company's entire existence from 1943 to 1967, and wrote most of that publisher's stories from 1957 to 1967 under a variety of pseudonyms. His best-known character is Herbie Popnecker, created under the pseudonym Shane O'Shea, with artist Ogden Whitney.

== Biography ==
=== Early life and career ===
Richard E. Hughes was born Leo Rosenbaum on November 5, 1909. He graduated from New York University in 1930 with a Bachelor of Arts degree as an English major and Economics minor. He married his wife, Annabel, on January 19, 1935. By 1940, Hughes was working in sales at Standard Mirror and Metal Products in New York City, writing catalog copy, and had also begun writing for publisher Ned Pines' Standard Comics. There he and artist Alexander Kostuk created the superhero Doc Strange (no relation to Marvel Comics' much later Doctor Strange) in Thrilling Comics #1 (cover-dated Feb. 1940).

The following year, Hughes was working for the Syndicated Features Corporation. This was "one of the many branches of the Sangor Shop," the colloquial name for businessman Benjamin W. Sangor's studio of writers and artists that, like other such "packagers" of the time, created comics on demand for publishers testing the new medium. Hughes' resume at the time listed him as an editorial assistant; by 1943, he was an editor there.

Through Syndicated Features Corp., Hughes and artist Dave Gabrielson created the superhero the Black Terror in Standard's Exciting Comics #9 (May 1941). Also in 1941, Hughes edited and wrote the tabloid-sized satirical-humor magazine TNT for Sangor's Cinema Comics imprint, and at least edit the small 7 1/2 x 9 1/4-inch promotional comic book Cinema Comics Herald used to promote films including Mr. Bug Goes to Town, Lady for a Night and others through 1943. By the following year Hughes was editing comics for Standard and living with his wife at 120 West 183rd Street in The Bronx, New York City. After Sangor founded his own comic-book company, American Comics Group, in 1943, Hughes edited the line, beginning with the talking animal series Giggle Comics and Ha Ha Comics, and the teen-humor titles "Cookie" and The Kilroys. He created and scripted stories of the Fighting Yank, Pyroman, the Commando Clubs, and Super Mouse. In addition to his ACG work, Hughes also edited Standard's Real Life Comics, as well as comics for publishers Rural Home, LaSalle, and Leffingwell. For Custom Comics, also called Culver Comics, an ACG division created in 1954, Hughes wrote promotional comics for the likes of police and fire departments, the Brown Shoe company (colloquially known as "Buster Brown Shoes"), Howard Johnson restaurants, the U.S. Air Force, and dozens of other clients.

An October 1, 1952 "Statement of the Ownership, Management, and Circulation" published in ACG's Forbidden Worlds #15 gave the publisher's name as Preferred Publications, Inc., 8 Lord St., Buffalo, New York" and the owners as Preferred Publications and "B. W. Sangor, 7 West 81st Street, New York, N. Y." The editor was listed as Richard E.Hughes, 120 West 183rd St., New York, N. Y." and the business manager as "Frederick H. Iger, 50 Beverly Road, Great Neck, Great Neck, L. I., N. Y." An October 1, 1950 statement published in ACG's Cookie #29 gives identical data, with the exception of the publisher and co-owner being listed as "Michel Publications, Inc. 420 DeSoto Ave., St. Louis 7, Mo.

=== Later life and career ===
Hughes additionally wrote radio and television advertisements. His final comics work was uncredited stories for DC Comics' Superman's Pal, Jimmy Olsen, Hawkman and supernatural-mystery anthologies. His final job appears to have been for Gimbel's department store, composing response letters to customer complaints.

A Richard E. Hughes was listed as publisher of Toy Market Research Inc.'s biweekly trade magazine Toy Reporter that was premiering October 2, 1961. It is unclear if this is the same Hughes.

Hughes died on January 15, 1974, of myelofibrosis

== Legacy ==
After Hughes' death, his wife donated his papers to Fairleigh Dickinson University in Madison, New Jersey.

Hughes posthumously received the Bill Finger Award in 2016.

== Critical analysis ==
In a review of the Dark Horse Comics collections Herbie: Volume One and Herbie: Volume Two, The New York Times described Hughes' Herbie Popnecker as,

...a corpulent kid with half-lidded eyes, thick glasses and a hideous bowl cut. His father calls him a “little fat nothing,” not realizing that Herbie is actually a colossus striding across the cultural landscape of his era. With the aid of his super-empowering lollipops, Herbie punches out Sonny Liston, confronts Fidel Castro and gets sent on a secret mission by U Thant. Hughes took a while to perfect his stories’ tone of deadpan absurdity, but Whitney’s slightly stiff, matter-of-fact artwork improves the gags by understating them.

== Hughes's pseudonyms ==
- Pierre Alonzo
- Ace Aquila
- Brad Everson
- Lafcadio Lee
- Kermit Lundgren
- Shane O'Shea (for Nemesis, drawn by Pete Costanza, and Herbie, drawn by Ogden Whitney)
- Greg Olivetti
- Kurato Osaki
- Pierce Rand
- Bob Standish
- Zev Zimmer (for Magicman, drawn by Pete Costanza)

=== Pictures of Hughes' Pseudonyms ===
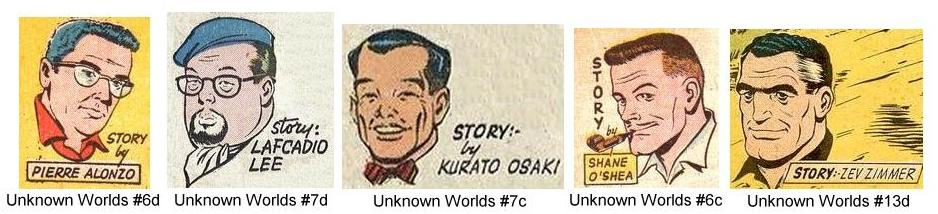

In Unknown Worlds (ACG 1960–1967), story and art credits for the first 22 issues were accompanied by drawings of the contributors. Because almost all stories were written by the same writer, the pictures for the story credit were mostly fictitious.
