= List of Standard Comics publications =

Standard Comics was an American comic book company owned by publisher Ned Pines. Standard in turn was the parent company of two comic-book lines: Better Publications and Nedor Publishing. Collectors and historians sometimes refer to them collectively as "Standard/Better/Nedor". In 1956, Standard's remaining three titles were incorporated into the Pines Comics lineup along with a variety of titles from St. John Publications.

This is list of Standard Comics publications.

== Titles ==
- Adventures into Darkness #5–14 (August 1952 – June 1954); Standard / Visual Editions
- Alley Oop #10–18 (October 1947 – October 1949); Standard / Visual Editions
- America's Best Comics #18–31 (June 1946 – July 1949); Standard / Visual Editions, from Nedor Comics
- America's Biggest Comics Book #1 (1944); Standard / William H. Wise & Company
- America's Funniest Comics #1–2 (1944); Standard / William H. Wise & Company
- Barnyard Comics #1–31 (June 1944 – September 1950); Polo Magazine, Inc. / Animated Cartoons Inc., continued as Dizzy Duck
- Battlefront #5 (June 1952); Standard / Visual Editions
- Best Romance #5–7 (March–August 1952); Standard / Visual Editions
- Billy West #1–8 (April 1949 – November 1950); Standard / Visual Editions
- Bill West #9–10 (February 1951 – February 1952); Standard / Visual Editions
- The Black Terror #15–27 (July 1946 – June 1949); Standard / Visual Editions, from Nedor Comics
- Boots and Her Buddies #5–9 (September 1948 – September 1949); Standard / Visual Editions
- Brick Bradford #5–8 (July 1948 – July 1949); Standard / Best Books Inc.
- Broncho Bill #5–16 (January 1948 – December 1950); Standard / Visual Editions
- Buster Bunny #1–16 (November 1949 – October 1953); Standard / Animated Cartoons Inc. / Literary Enterprises Inc.
- Buz Sawyer #1–3 (June 1948 – January 1949); Standard / Best Books Inc.
- Buz Sawyer's Pal, Sweeney #4–5 (June 1949 – September 1949); Standard / Best Books Inc.
- Captain Easy #10–17 (October 1947 – September 1949); Standard / Visual Editions
- Coo Coo Comics #26–56, 60–62 (October 1942 – April 1951, December 1951 – April 1952); Standard / Animated Cartoons Inc., from Nedor Comics
- Coo Coo, the Bird Brain #57–59 (June 1951 – October 1951); Standard / Animated Cartoons Inc.
- Crime Files #5–6 (September 1952 – November 1952); Standard / Visual Editions
- Date with Danger #5–6 (December 1952 — February 1953); Standard / Standard Magazines
- Dennis the Menace #1–14 (August 1953 – January 1956); Visual Editions / Literary Enterprises; see Pines below
- Dennis the Menace Giant Vacation Special (Summer 1955); Literary Enterprises
- Dennis the Menace Giant Christmas Issue (Winter 1955); Literary Enterprises, continued under Pines
- Dizzy Duck #32–39 (November 1950 – March 1952); Standard / Animated Cartoons Inc., continued from Barnyard Comics
- Etta Kett #11–14 (December 1948 – September 1949); King Features / Best Books Inc.
- Exciting War #5 (September 1952); Standard / Visual Editions, continued under Better Publications
- Fantastic Worlds #5–7 (October 1952 – January 1953); Standard / Visual Editions/ Literary Enterprises Inc.
- Fighting Yank #17–29 (August 1946 – August 1949); Standard / Visual Editions
- Freckles and His Friends #5–12 (November 1947 – August 1949); Standard / Visual Editions
- Goofy Comics #15–48 (August 1946 – March 1952); Standard / Animated Cartoons Inc., from Nedor Comics
- Happy Comics #14–40 (July 1946 – December 1950); Standard / Animated Cartoons Inc., from Nedor Comics, continued as Happy Rabbit
- Happy Rabbit #41–48 (February 1951 – April 1948); Standard / Animated Cartoons Inc., continued from Happy Comics
- It Really Happened #1–11 (1944 — October 1947); Standard / William H. Wise & Company / Visual Editions
- Jet Fighters #5–7 (November 1952 – March 1953); Standard / Visual Editions
- Jetta #5–7 (December 1952 – April 1953); Standard / Standard Magazine Inc.
- Jiggs and Maggie #11–21 (June 1949–January 1952); Standard / Best Books Inc., continues at Harvey Comics
- Joe Palooka Visits the Lost City (1945); Standard / Best Books Inc.
- Joe Yank #5–16 (March 1952 – July 1954); Standard / Visual Editions
- Johnny Hazard #5–8 (August 1948 – May 1949); King Features / Best Books Inc.
- Jungle Jim #11–15 (January 1949 – November 1950); Standard / Best Books Inc.
- Kathy #1–17 (September 1949 – September 1955); Standard / Visual Editions / Literary Enterprises
- King Comics #156–159 (Spring 1950 – February 1952); King Features / Best Books Inc., from [David McKay Publications|David KcKay]
- Leroy #1–5 (November 1949 – September 1950); Standard / Visual Editions
- Little Angel #5–6 (September 1954–September 1955; see Pines below)
- Little Miss Muffet (December 1948 – May 1949); King Features / Best Books Inc.
- Lost Worlds #5–6 (October 1952 – December 1952); Standard / Literary Enterprises Inc.
- Lucky Duck #5–8 (January 1953 – September 1953); Standard / Literary Enterprises
- Mark Trail #1 (October 1955); see Pines below
- Mel Allen Sports Comics #5–6 (November 1949 – June 1950); Standard / Visual Editions
- My Real Love #5 (June 1952); Standard / Visual Editions
- Mystery Comics #1–4 (August 1944 – December 1944); Standard / William H. Wise & Company
- New Romances #5–21 (May 1951 – May 1954); Standard / Visual Editions
- Out of the Shadows #5–14 (July 1952 – August 1954); Standard / Visual Editions
- Ozark Ike #11–25 (November 1948 – September 1952); Standard / Best Books Inc.
- Real Life Comics #32–59 (June 1946 — September 1952); Standard / Visual Editions, from Nedor Comics
- Peter Pig #5–6 (May 1953 – August 1953); Standard / Literary Enterprises
- Reg'lar Fellers #5–6 (November 1947 – March 1948); Standard / Visual Editions
- Ricky #5 (September 1953); Standard / Visual Editions
- Rodger Dodger #5 (August 1952); Standard / Visual Editions
- Santa's Christmas Comics (December 1952); Standard / Best Books Inc.
- Sniffy the Pup #5–18 (November 1949 – September 1953); Standard / Animated Cartoons Inc. / Literary Enterprises Inc.
- Spunky #1–7 (April 1949 – November 1951); Standard / Animated Cartoons Inc. (#3–7 cover titled Spunky, Junior Cowboy)
- Starlet O'Hara in Hollywood #1–4 (December 1948 – July 1949); Standard / Visual Editions
- Supermouse #1–34 (December 1948 – September 1955); Standard / Animated Cartoons Inc. / Literary Enterprises Inc.; see Pines below
- Teena #20–22 (August 1948 – October 1950); Standard / Best Books Inc.
- Television Comics #5–8 (February 1952 – November 1952); Standard / Animated Cartoons Inc.
- This is War #5–9 (August 1952 – May 1953); Standard / Visual Editions
- Thrilling Comics #39–80 (December 1939 – April 1951); Standard / Standard Magazine Inc.
- Thrilling Love #5–26 (December 1949 – June 1954); Standard / Standard Magazines Inc.
- Tim Tyler, Cowboy #1–18 (November 1948 – September 1950); Standard / Best Books Inc.
- Today's Romance #5–8 (March 1952 — September 1952); Standard / Visual Editions
- Tommy of the Big Top #11–12 (December 1948 – March 1949); Standard / Best Books Inc.
- Tuffy #5–9 (July 1949 – October 1950); Standard / Best Books Inc.
- The Unseen #5–15 (June 1952 – July 1954); Standard / Visual Editions
- Western Hearts #1–10 (December 1949 – March 1952); Standard / Standard Magazines Inc.
- Who is Next? #5 (January 1953); Standard / Standard Magazines Inc.
- Willie the Penguin #1–6 (April 1951 – March 1952); Standard / Animated Cartoons Inc.

== Better Publications ==
- American's Best Comics #1–2 (February 1942 – September 1942); continued under Nedor Comics
- Best Comics #1–4 (November 1939 – February 1940)
- Cartoon Humor
- Exciting Comics #1–69 (April 1940 – September 1949)
- Exciting War #6–9 (November 1952 – November 1953); continued from Standard Comics, with Standard Comics cover banner
- Popular Romance #5—29 (December 1949 – July 1954); with Standard Comics cover banner
- Real Life Comics #1–4 (September 1941 – April 1942); continued under Nedor Comics
- Startling Comics #1–53 (June 1940 – September 1948)
- Thrilling Comics #1–38 (February 1940 – October 1943); continued under Standard Comics
- Wonder Comics #8–20 (October 1946 – October 1948); #1–7 (May 1944 – January 1946) from Great Comics Publications, Inc.

== Nedor Comics ==
- America's Best Comics #3–17 (November 1942 – March 1946); from Better Publications, continued under Standard Comics
- The Black Terror #1–14 (Winter 1942/43 – Jan. 1944); continued under Standard Comics
- Coo Coo Comics #1–25 (October 1942 – May 1946); continued under Standard Comics
- Fighting Yank #1–16 (September 1942 – May 1946); continued under Standard Comics
- Funny Funnies #1, 68pgs (April 1943)
- Goofy Comics #1–14 (June 1943 – June 1946); continued under Standard Comics
- Happy Comics #1–13 (August 1943 – March 1946); continued under Standard Comics
- Major Hoople Comics #1 (February 1943)
- Real Funnies #1–3 (January 1943 – June 1943)
- Real Life Comics #5–31 (May 1942 – May 1946); from Better Publications, continued under Standard Comics

== Pines Comics ==
- Adventures of Mighty Mouse #129–144 (May 1956 – April 1959); picked up from St. John, went to Dell Comics
- Adventures of Winky Dink #75 (March 1957)
- Clay Cody, Gunslinger #1 (Fall 1957)
- Dennis the Menace #15–31 (March 1956 – November 1958); picked up from Standard, went to Fawcett Comics
- Dennis the Menace Giant #2–6 (Summer 1956 – June 1958); Hal-Den Publications Inc.; picked up from Standard, went to Fawcett Comics
- Dinky Duck #16–19 (Fall 1956–Summer 1958); picked up from St. John
- Gandy Goose #5–6 (Fall 1956–Summer 1958); picked up from St. John
- Heckle and Jeckle #25–34 (Fall 1956–June 1959); picked up from St. John, went to Dell
- Knights of the Round Table #10 (April 1957)
- Let's Take a Trip #1 (Summer 1958); CBS Television Presents
- Little Angel #7–16 (August 1956–September 1959); picked up from Standard
- Little Roquefort Comics #10 (Summer 1958); picked up from St. John
- Mark Trail's Adventure Book of Nature #1 (Summer 1958)
- Paul Terry's Mighty Mouse #68–71 (March 1956–December 1956); picked up from St. John, continued as Mighty Mouse
- Mighty Mouse #72–83 (March 1957–June 1959); continued from Paul Terry's Mighty Mouse (cover titled New Mighty Mouse)
- Mighty Mouse Fun Club Magazine #1–6 (1957–1958)
- Supermouse, the Big Cheese #35–45 (April 1956–Fall 1958); picked up from Standard
- Sweetie Pie #15 (October 1957); picked up from Ajax-Farrell
- Terrytoons Giant Summer Fun Book #101–102 (Summer 1957–Summer 1958)
- Terrytoons, the Terry Bears #4 (June 1958); picked up from St. John
- Tom Terrific #1–6 (Summer 1957 – Fall 1958)
- Zippy the Chimp #50–51 (March 1957 – August 1957); CBS Television Presents
