= Sun Girl =

Sun Girl may refer to the following characters in comic books:

- Sun Girl (Marvel Comics), a superheroine
- Sun Girl (Deborah Morgna), a supervillainess of Deathstroke's Titans, a Titans East team in the Teen Titans comic books
