= Superkatt =

Publication information
- Publisher: American Comics Group
- First appearance: Giggle Comics #9 (June 1944)
- Created by: Dang a.k.a. Dan Gordon

In-story information
- Notable aliases: Supe

Superkatt is an American cartoon animal comic book series by Dan Gordon (under the comics pen name "Dang"), a jab at the “long-underwear” genre of superhero comics. The series stars Superkatt, an anthropomorphic cat who wears a bowtie, bonnet, and diaper as a superhero costume. Ron Goulart, author of Ron Goulart's Great History of Comic Books, said that Superkatt was Dang's most memorable comic book character. Denis Gifford, author of The International Book of Comics, said that the character "was as silly as his supercostume."

Superkatt was an ordinary housecat who thought that he had superpowers, although all he did was drink vitamin milk. However, he did often successfully (if accidentally) defeat his enemies; at one point, he capture a U-boat.

== Publication history ==
Superkatt first appeared in American Comics Group's Giggle Comics #9 in 1944. The series was a regular feature in Giggle until 1955, when creator Gordon returned to the animation field. The character also made an appearance in ACG's series Ha-Ha Comics in 1946.

== Character ==
- Superkatt - An anthropomorphic cat nicknamed "Supe." Superkatt does not have any super powers at all, but is a normal (talking) house cat that dresses in a diaper, a baby's bonnet, and a big blue bow to fight minor neighborhood injustices.

=== Supporting characters ===
- Humphrey - An anthropomorphic dog character
- Petunia - An African American human who works as a maid
- Junior - A human child. Junior wears Superkatt's superhero clothing when Superkatt is not in costume.
- Lassie - A female dog who Humphrey develops a crush on.
- Trelawney - A cat who decided to disguise himself as Superkatt in order to steal some birds.
- Clancy - A cat who is Trelawney's accomplice.
- Chauncey - A dog.

== In other media ==
In 1947, Superkatt appeared in the animated short Leave Us Chase It, a part of the Phantasies series. A cat, who is being tormented by a mouse, reads a comic book and receives inspiration from it, so he dresses up as Superkatt and decides to fight back. The cat was voiced by Bill Shaw.
