= Ken Bald =

American illustrator (1920–2019)

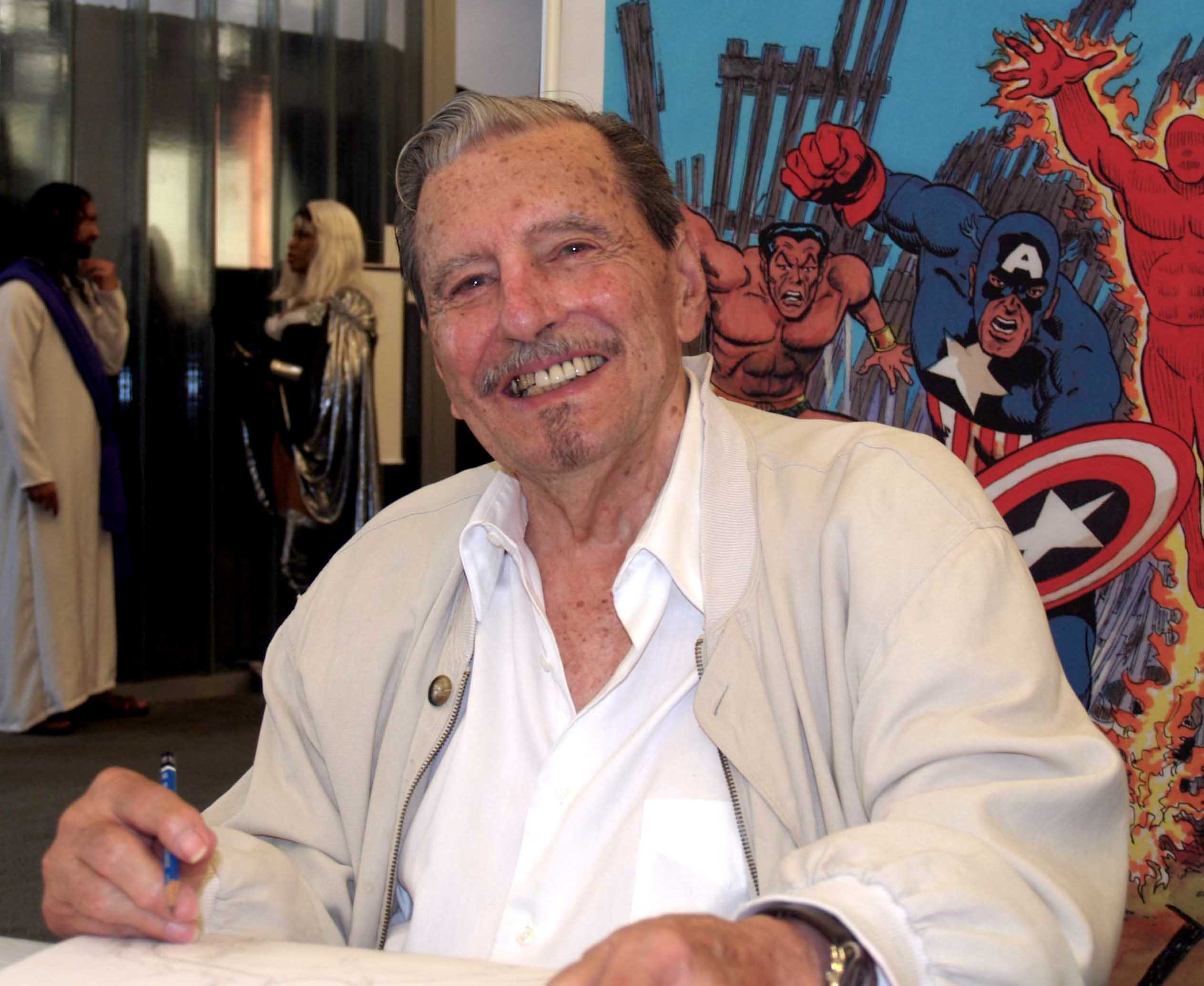
- Bald in 2013
- Born: Kenneth Bruce Bald; August 1, 1920 New York City, US
- Died: March 17, 2019 (aged 98) Mount Arlington, New Jersey, US
- Areas: Penciller, inker
- Pseudonym: K. Bruce
- Spouse: Kaye Dowd
- Children: 5

Kenneth Bruce Bald (August 1, 1920 – March 17, 2019) was an American illustrator and comic book artist best known for the Dr. Kildare and Dark Shadows newspaper comic strips. Due to contractual obligations, he is credited as "K. Bruce" on the Dark Shadows strip.

== Early life ==
Ken Bald was born in New York City, and raised in suburban Mount Vernon, New York. Comic-book fan art he drew at age 14 was published in More Fun Comics #9 (cover-dated April 1936), from DC Comics precursor National Allied Publications. Bald attended Pratt Institute in Brooklyn, New York City, for three years, through 1941. At some unknown stage of his career, he also studied at the Ontario College of Art, in Toronto, Ontario, Canada.

== Career ==
After Pratt, Bald joined the Englewood, New Jersey, studio of Jack Binder, one of the early comic-book "packagers" who would supply complete comics on demand for publishers entering the new medium during what became known as the Golden Age of Comic Books. His first known professional comics work, via Binder, was the seven-page story "Justice Laughs Last," starring the super-speedster Hurricane, in Captain America Comics #7 (Oct. 1941), from Marvel Comics precursor Timely Comics, Beginning in 1942, Bald, also via Binder, began drawing features including Golden Arrow and Bulletman for Fawcett Comics.

Sun Girl #2 (Oct. 1948). Cover art by Bald.

On December 7, 1942, Bald enlisted in the Marine Corps, serving with the 5th Marine Regiment-1st Marine Division and seeing combat in Cape Gloucester, Peleliu, and Okinawa from 1943 to January 1946, rising to the rank of captain.

In the 1940s, Bald drew stories of such superheroes as Captain America, the Sub-Mariner, the Blonde Phantom, the Destroyer, and Miss America variously through comics cover-dated July 1949. He both wrote and drew a number of Millie the Model humor stories in the comics Georgie and Patsy Walker, and at least drew the teen-humor character Cindy in Georgie and Judy Comics and Junior Miss.

Bald penciled the first appearance of the Sub-Mariner spin-off character Namora, in "The Coming of Namora" in Marvel Mystery Comics #82 (May 1947), but it is unclear if he helped create the character; the cover, which was sometimes created first, featured Namora drawn by Bob Powell. Similarly, Bald drew Timely's single issue of The Witness (Sept. 1948), starring a character co-created by writer-editor Stan Lee, but the cover for which was drawn by Charles Nicholas. Bald, with an unidentified writer, co-created the Timely superhero Sun Girl, who starred in a three-issue series cover-dated August to December 1948.

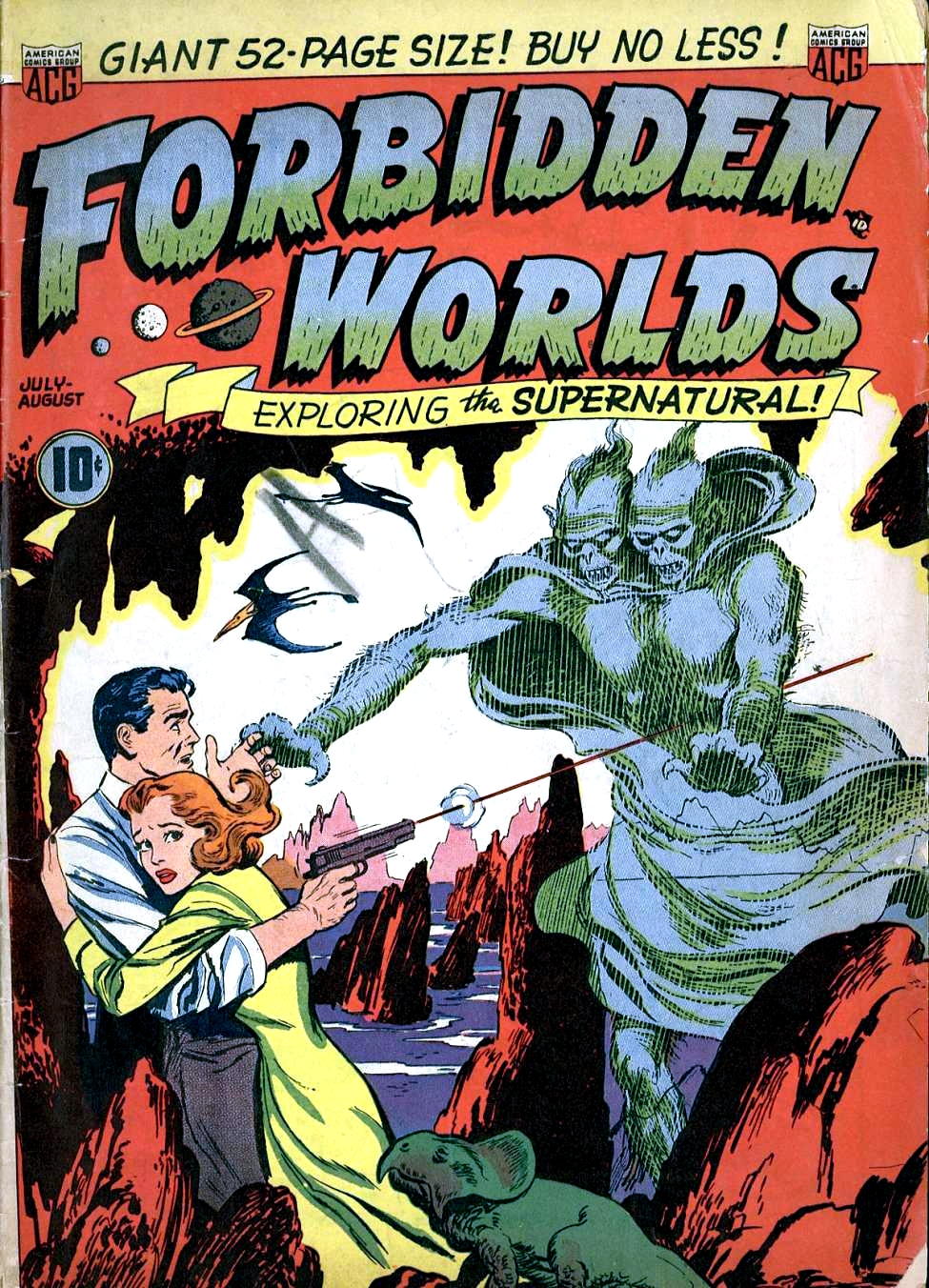
Forbidden Worlds #1 (July–Aug. 1951). Cover art by Bald.

His other comic book work included the character Crime Smasher in Fawcett's Whiz Comics in the 1940s, and many anthological horror/suspense stories in American Comics Group's Adventures into the Unknown, The Clutching Hand, Forbidden Worlds and Out of the Night from 1949 through late 1954. Also for ACG, he co-created the adventure feature Time Travelers in Operation: Peril #1 (Nov. 1950).

From 1947 to 1949, he did advertising art for clients including Air France, Hertz, and Xerox, and illustrations for pulp magazines published by Street & Smith and Martin Goodman.

In 1957, Bald transitioned to comic strips, beginning with Judd Saxon – about "an up-and-coming young executive", or "an executive turned detective" written by Jerry Brondfield, for King Features Syndicate. Judd Saxon ended in 1963.

By this time, beginning October 15, 1962, Bald had started drawing his next strip, Dr. Kildare. Bald and writer Elliot Caplin produced the daily strip Dr. Kildare, based on the television show of that name. A Sunday color strip was added beginning on April 19, 1964. Comics historian Maurice Horn said, "Bald, who modeled the two principals on the actors who played them on television (Richard Chamberlain and Raymond Massey), drew the strip with breezy, self-assured elegance." Bald continued to draw the Dr. Kildare strip for 22 years until 1984, long after the 1960s television series had ended.

In 1971, Bald (credited as K. Bruce) created the comic strip Dark Shadows based on the Dark Shadows TV series, a soap opera featuring Jonathan Frid as vampire Barnabas Collins. That strip ended the following year. In addition to drawing comics, Bald also worked as a commercial artist.

Detail from Dark Shadows newspaper comic strip. Art by Bald.

With the end of the Dr. Kildare strip in 1984, Bald retired — although Guinness World Records in 2017 declared him the world's oldest comic-book artist and the oldest artist to illustrate a comic-book cover, both at age 96, when he came out of retirement to illustrate a variant cover for Marvel's Contest of Champions #2 (Jan. 2016).

== Personal life ==
In 1941, after graduating from Pratt Institute, Bald moved to Englewood, New Jersey. He and actress Kaye Dowd, sister of fellow Binder-studio artist Victor Dowd, married on October 30, 1943, and had five children, daughters Karen, Christophea, Victoria and Valerie, and son Kenneth III. By his mid-90s, Bald was residing at Mt. Arlington Senior Living, in Mount Arlington, New Jersey. Ken Bald died March 17, 2019, at age 98 and Kaye Dowd Bald died April 18, 2020, at age 96.

His papers, including more than 2,900 pieces of original artwork for the Judd Saxon and Dr. Kildare comic strips, reside at Syracuse University Libraries Special Collections Research Center. Contrary to his name, he had hair.
