= Dan Gordon (animator) =

American animator

- Born: Daniel Campbell Gordon; July 13, 1902 Pittston, Pennsylvania, United States
- Died: August 13, 1970 (aged 68) Atlanta, Georgia, United States
- Areas: Animator, comic book artist
- Pseudonym: Dang
- Notable works: Popeye the Sailor cartoons Superman (1940s cartoons); Superkatt; Cookie O'Toole
- Spouse: Margaret Hannon
- Children: 3
- Relatives: George Gordon (brother)

Daniel Campbell Gordon (July 13, 1902 – August 13, 1970) was an American storyboard artist and film director who was best known for his work at Famous Studios (where he was one of the first directors) and later at Hanna-Barbera Productions. He wrote and directed several Popeye the Sailor and Superman cartoons. Later in his career, he worked on several cartoons featuring Yogi Bear, Huckleberry Hound, and many others. His younger brother, George Gordon, also worked for Hanna-Barbera.

Gordon also wrote and illustrated comic books under his pen name: "Dang".

== Career ==
=== Van Beuren Studios, Fleischer Studios and Famous Studios ===
Dan Gordon started his animation career as a story man at New York's Van Beuren Studios, and by 1936, he received a director's credit there. After Van Beuren closed its animation department in 1936, Gordon and many of his colleagues went to work for Paul Terry’s Terrytoons. It was here that Gordon worked with Joe Barbera (another Van Beuren alumni) on Pink Elephants, a cartoon that Barbera described as "one of the first cartoons I had a hand in actually creating from the beginning.”

Gordon and Barbera headed out West to MGM in 1937, but, Gordon returned to the East shortly thereafter to help re-write the troubled animated feature film, Gulliver’s Travels at Fleischer Studios. Gordon's rewrites could not save much of Gulliver, but Gordon was instrumental in the success of the Fleischer Studio's next hit: the 1941 Superman theatrical animated shorts.

Gordon was one of four directors put in charge of production when Paramount seized control of the Fleischer studio in Miami. While he only stayed at the newly dubbed Famous Studios for a couple of years, the Popeye shorts he directed are notable for their intense comic energy and extended fourth-wall-breaking gags. The Hungry Goat, released in 1943, stands out as an attempt to popularize his own creation Billy the Kid, a screwball anthropomorphic goat. This work was heavily influenced by contemporary Warner Bros. shorts. The fast-pace of those Popeye cartoons led to the comic book stories he crafted for The American Comics Group (ACG). Gordon was fired from Famous Studios in late 1943 or early 1944, presumably due to alcohol-related problems.

=== Comic books ===
==== Superkatt and cartoon animals ====
Gordon was part of a group of animation pros led by Jim Davis of (Fox and the Crow) fame that supplied original talking-animal comic book stories to ACG and DC Comics. Gordon's work began appearing in Giggle Comics in 1944, and by Giggle #9, he introduced the long-running character Superkatt who was a jab at the “long-underwear” genre of superhero comics. The title's character does not have any superpowers at all but is a normal (talking) house cat that dresses in a diaper, a baby's bonnet, and a big blue bow to fight minor neighborhood injustices.

In 1949 came Funny Films, a talking-animal anthology title that tried to convince the reader that its stories were the filmed exploits of famous Hollywood cartoon characters.

Gordon's Puss and Boots was a dog-and-cat version of Tom and Jerry to the extreme, with its only theme being unbridled cartoon violence. Gordon's other Funny Films character was the comical rabbit inventor Blunder Bunny. In La Salle Comics' Hi-Jinx, he experimented with the hybrid idea of “teenage animal characters”.

==== Cookie O'Toole ====
Gordon's major character from this era is Cookie O’Toole, the teenage star of Cookie comics. Cookie's first appearance was in 1945, debuting alongside other major characters, such as Jotterbook, Angelus, Zoot, and “The Brain” in a one-shot issue of Topsy-Turvy Comics. By the next year, Cookie had his own title, and began a run that lasted nine years and 55 issues.

Gordon continued to make comics for ACG (and ACG imprints like La Salle) before returning at Joseph Barbera's behest.

=== Hanna-Barbera ===
Bill Hanna and Joseph Barbera had been creating the classic Tom and Jerry cartoons at MGM since 1940, but by 1957 the studio's animation division was shut down. In a bid to stay alive in the new TV era, Hanna and Barbera struck out on a mission to make a weekly animated television series for a fraction of their old Tom and Jerry budgets.

Gordon immediately jumped on board to help out at Hanna-Barbera, and (with partner Charles Shows) was soon writing and drawing storyboards for most of the episodes of those earliest, foundational H-B cartoon classics: Huckleberry Hound, Yogi Bear, Pixie & Dixie, Quick Draw McGraw, and Augie Doggie. Huckleberry Hound became the first animated program to be honored with an Emmy Award in 1960. Emboldened by their early success on a Saturday morning, Hanna and Barbera set their sights on producing a prime-time domestic comedy with a prehistoric twist. Gordon had some experience with cartoon cavemen, having worked on the “Stone Age” series of animated shorts for Fleischer Studios back in 1940. Although many talented people had a part in creating what would become The Flintstones, Bill Hanna points to Gordon. “Now you may not get the same response from anybody else" Bill Hanna recalls, "but to me, Dan Gordon is responsible for The Flintstones, he came up with the basic concept of doing it with cavemen in skins.” And Joe Barbera recounts in his autobiography that, ”the first two Flintstones were the work of Dan Gordon and myself; I controlled the content, and Dan did the storyboards.”

Dan Gordon ultimately continued to work for Hanna-Barbera until his death in 1970.

== Death ==
Gordon died on August 13, 1970, just one month after his 68th birthday in Fulton County, Georgia. He is buried in Arlington Memorial Park, in Sandy Springs, Georgia.

His wife, Margaret Hannon, died at the age of 39 in 1946 from brain cancer. Dan and Margaret had three sons. The first son, Kevin, who also worked at Hanna-Barbera, died in a house fire in Malibu, in 1965. His second son, Michael, died in 1965 in a car accident in Los Angeles. His third son, Donal, died in 1994 from cancer in Seattle. Dan Gordon died of liver disease while in a nursing home in Atlanta, GA in 1970.

== Legacy ==
Gordon's cartoons live on through sales of DVD reissues featuring many of his Superman and Popeye cartoons, and deluxe DVD sets of Huckleberry Hound and The Flintstones. Some of his work from the early Van Beuren Studios and Terrytoons days can be found on video streaming sites on the Internet. With the advent of eBay, online comic shops, and cartoon/comics blogs, today, well-worn back issues of Gordon's comics such as Giggle, Ha-Ha, and Cookie are easier to find and can be bought at reasonable costs. Many fans of Gordon's work have been scanning and sharing these public-domain stories online.
