= Ogden Whitney =

American comics creator (1919–1975)

- Whitney self-portrait from Unknown Worlds No. 4 (Dec. 1960)
- Born: John Ogden Whitney; May 1, 1919 Cambridge, Massachusetts, U.S.
- Died: August 13, 1975 (aged 56) Bronx, New York, U.S.
- Areas: Writer, penciller
- Notable works: Herbie Popnecker; Skyman; Waku, Prince of the Bantu

John Ogden Whitney (May 1, 1919 – August 13, 1975) was an American comic-book artist and sometime writer active from the 1930s–1940s Golden Age of comics through the 1960s Silver Age. He is best known as co-creator of the aviator hero Skyman and of the superpowered novelty character Herbie Popnecker and his alter ego, the satiric superhero the Fat Fury. Whitney as well had long runs on characters as diverse as the Western masked crime-fighter the Two-Gun Kid, and the career-girl character Millie the Model.

In 2007, Whitney was one of two comics creators inducted into the comic-book industry's Will Eisner Award Hall of Fame, as a "Judges Choice".

== Biography ==
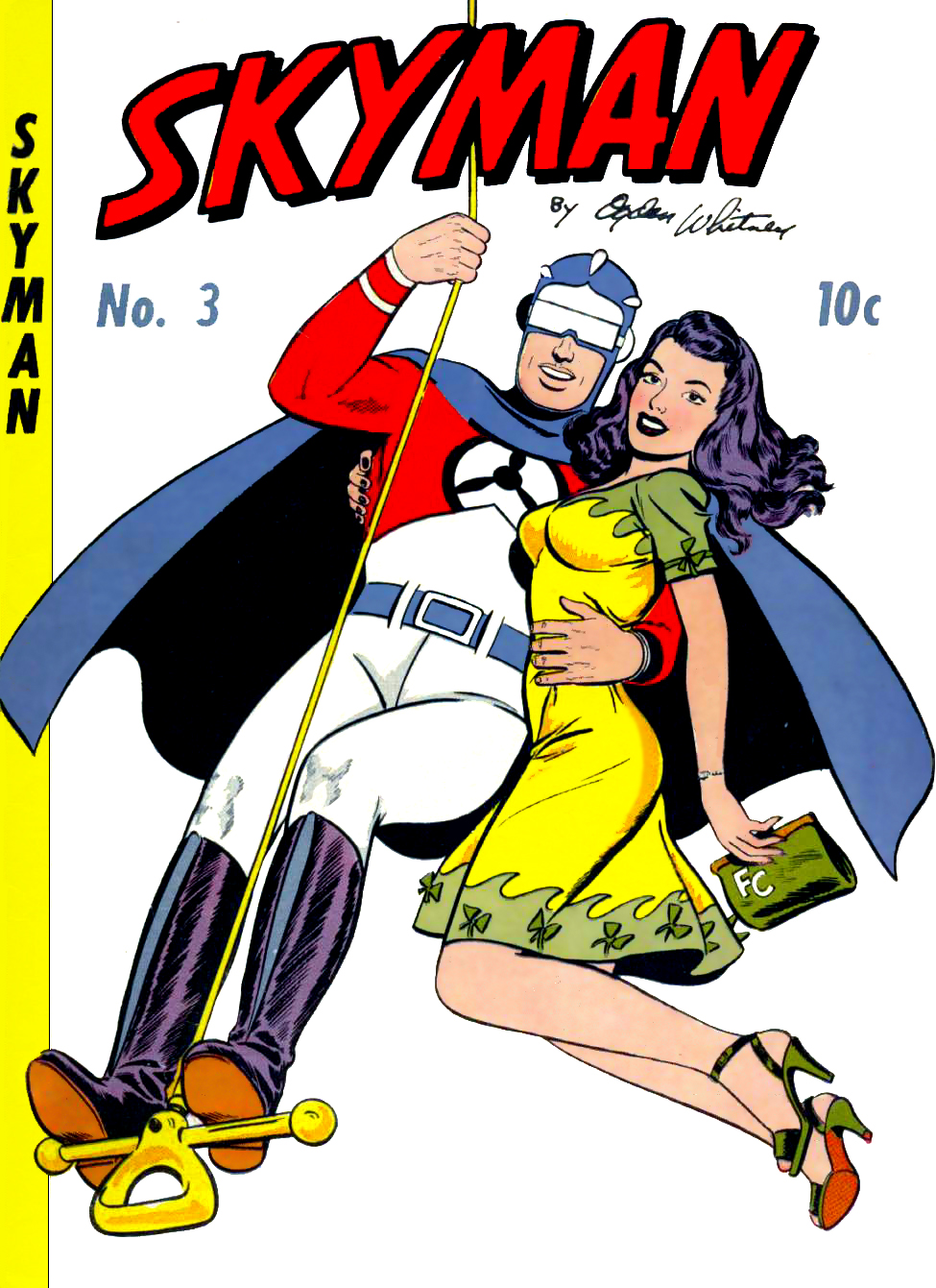
Skyman No. 3 (1947, no month listed). Cover art by Whitney

=== Early life and career ===
Ogden Whitney was born in Cambridge, Massachusetts in 1918. His earliest recorded comic-book credit is drawing the six-page story "In the Pit of Dagan", written by Gardner Fox and starring adventurer Cotton Carver, in Adventure Comics No. 42 (Sept. 1939), published by DC Comics predecessor National Comics. He continued on the feature (both writing and drawing one story), and briefly succeeded artist Creig Flessel on the more prominent and enduring character the Sandman with issue No. 46 (Jan. 1940).

He continued on both features for two more issues before working primarily for Columbia Comics for the remainder of the decade, co-creating Skyman with writer Fox in Big Shot Comics No. 1 (May 1940). That issue he also co-created (with an unknown writer), the adventure character Rocky Ryan, soon scripted by Fox. The team continued on both features through at least issue No. 11 (March 1941); records are spotty for this relatively obscure publisher, and such reference sources as the Grand Comics Database (cited here) list only those features, without credits, running well in 1942, when Skyman and Rocky Ryan credits for Fox and Whitney resume. (The title became simply Big Shot with issue No. 30, Dec. 1942). Fox and Whitney (who also drew the vast majority of the covers) also collaborated on such additional Big Shot Comics characters as the Cloak, and the demon-masked war correspondent and World War II Axis-fighter the Face (all the stories for which the duo provided in issue No. 2 of his two-issue spin-off series). They also launched the solo title Skyman in 1941; four issues were published from then through 1948.

Whitney was inducted into the U.S. Army in January 1943. There he completed eight weeks of truck-driving school before being assigned to work as an artist in the orientation office of Camp Lee in Virginia. He drew no comics while on furlough, but did some comics work "after hours" in the camp office. He served in the Philippines during World War II, in a unit with fellow comic artist Fred Guardineer.

The Fox-Whitney team continued on Big Shot Comics confirmably through No. 44 (March 1944) and almost certainly beyond; Big Shot No. 97 (Jan. 1949), for example, contains a Whitney written-and-drawn Skyman story. Big Shot itself ran through issue No. 104 (Aug. 1949). The cover of Big Shot No. 67 (July 1946) welcomes home "Ex-Sgt. Ogden Whitney", who draws Skyman again "starting this issue", and the first page of its six-page Skyman story is headlined, "Welcome home, Ogden Whitney!" and calls it his first one since his return from WWII service.

By this time Whitney had begun drawing crime comics for Magazine Enterprises, including the features "Fallon of the F.B.I." and "Undercover Girl" in Manhunt from 1947 to 1948. He also drew the company's official adaptation of the 1948 movie Joan of Arc, starring Ingrid Bergman, published the same year in the umbrella title A-1 as Joan of Arc (A-1 #21). Whitney is tentatively credited as artist for the similar adaptation of Destination Moon in Fawcett Comics' of that title, also known as Fawcett Movie Comic No. 3 (1950).

=== 1950s to 1960s ===
Through the following decade, Whitney drew anthological science fiction and other stories for American Comics Group's Adventures into the Unknown and Forbidden Worlds, and co-created the white-hunter feature "Typhoon Tylor" in Operation: Peril #1 (Nov. 1950). Other ACG titles he worked on include issues of the war comics series Commander Battle and the Atomic Sub, the humor title Dizzy Dames, and the Western The Hooded Horseman. He additionally did some work for Ziff-Davis' Amazing Adventures and Skypilot, and did his earliest known work for the future Marvel Comics, then called Atlas Comics, with a four-page story in Apache Kid No. 8 (Sept. 1951).

He soon began contributing work as well to the Atlas horror titles Spellbound, Marvel Tales and Adventures into Terror. With writer Don Rico, he co-created the feature "Waku, Prince of the Bantu" — a rare feature in that it starred an African chieftain in Africa, with no regularly featured Caucasian characters – in the Atlas anthology Jungle Tales.

But it was ACG that remained his primary client. Whitney drew countless stories and covers for, primarily, Adventures into the Unknown and Forbidden Worlds from 1950 to 1965.

Herbie No. 3 (Aug. 1964), with Herbie's catchphrase. Cover art by Whitney

=== Herbie ===
By then he had co-created (with ACG editor Richard E. Hughes, under the pseudonym "Shane O'Shea") the work for which he would become best known, the novelty character Herbie Popnecker. Debuting in Forbidden Worlds No. 73 (Dec. 1958), the short, fat, deadpan young Herbie, constantly nursing a lollipop, wandered with slacker ennui through life as one of comics' most powerful beings. Little by little as his story progressed in Forbidden Worlds and in his 23-issue spin-off series, Herbie (May 1964 – Feb. 1967), he revealed abilities to fly (by walking on air), talk to animals (who knew him by name), become invisible, travel through time, and more. His parents were blithely unaware of either his powers or of his eventual superhero-satire identity as the Fat Fury. Whitney drew all the stories and almost all the covers for what became a cult-hit comic.

=== Later life and career ===
As ACG wound down and ceased publication in 1967, Whitney found work at Tower Comics, where he was one of the stable of artists drawing issues of T.H.U.N.D.E.R. Agents and NoMan, and Marvel Comics, where he became the regular artist for the Western series The Two-Gun Kid from No. 87 to the final issue, No. 92 (May 1967 – March 1968). He wrote and drew the lead story in the mostly reprint revival of the title, in No. 103 (March 1972), and penciled a nine-page backup story, "Invitation to a Gunfight", by writer Marv Wolfman, in the following issue (May 1972), marking his last known comics work.

Also in the mid-1960s for Marvel, Whitney drew issues of what was then the romantic-drama series Millie the Model and its sister title, Modeling with Millie. He additionally penciled and inked a 12-page "Nick Fury, Agent of S.H.I.E.L.D." story, over Jack Kirby layouts, in Strange Tales No. 149 (Oct. 1966).

Mad magazine editor Jerry DeFuccio wrote that circa 1965, Whitney lived in Manhattan at

... 40 Park Avenue South at the time. ... Naturally, I gushed about Whitney's Golden Age work when I visited his apartment. His wife, Anne, was quite lovely and refined but Whitney wasn't anything like the svelte characters he used to draw. Fat and obviously addicted to liquor. ... Anne seemed troubled by her husband's state. She supported the family with her private secretary job in the area of the Empire State Building. Richard E. Hughes, editor at American Comics Group, was especially helpful to 'old-timers' [and] gave Whitney work, though Ogden seemed absorbed in trying storyboard continuity samples to crack the advertising field. I saw him working on the special pads imprinted with rows of blank TV screen. He couldn't qualify. ... I passed Whitney's apartment house [circa 1972–1973] and asked the doorman: 'Does Ogden Whitney still live here?' The doorman spoke in a hush, 'No! His wife died and his condition became extremely irrational. He was finally evicted — carried bodily — from his apartment.'

Subsequent to this, Whitney was institutionalized, and died in a psychiatric hospital.

== Honors ==
In 2007, Whitney was one of two comics creators inducted into the comic-book industry's Will Eisner Award Hall of Fame, as a "Judges Choice" along with Robert Kanigher.

== Critical assessment ==
Dan Nadel, author, Art Out of Time: Unknown Comics Visionaries, 1900–1969 (Harry N. Abrams, 2006; ISBN 0-8109-5838-4; ISBN 978-0-8109-5838-8):

Whitney is a master of psychological distress. He had these super-bland faces; nobody looks distinctive. But then he'll throw in these crazy close-ups, or very oddball compositions, where things are static in space. I find them really compelling, almost terrifying. If you read his romance comics ... they're the weirdest romance comics ever. ... His version of men and women courting is men and women terrorizing each other for eight or sixteen pages. Pure terror. Psychological warfare. Also the thing about Whitney I like so much is that it's like phone book art – it's so generic it's unique.
