= Superior Spider-Man Team-Up =

Comic book series

- Cover to Superior Spider-Man Team-Up #1; Art by Paolo Rivera

Publication information
- Publisher: Marvel Comics
- Schedule: Monthly
- Format: Ongoing series
- Genre: Superhero
- Publication date: July 2013 – April 2014
- No. of issues: 12

Creative team
- Written by: Christopher Yost (#1–2, 5–8); Robert Rodi (#3–4); Kevin Shinick (#9–12)
- Artist(s): David Lopez (#1); Marco Checchetto (#2, 5–12); Mike Del Mundo (#3–4)
- Inker: Andy Owens
- Letterer: Joe Caramagna
- Colorist: Rachelle Rosenberg

Superior Spider-Man Team-Up was an ongoing comic book series published by Marvel Comics that debuted in July 2013. The series is written by Christopher Yost with artwork by a rotating team of artists including David Lopez, Paolo Rivera, and Marco Checchetto. A direct successor to Avenging Spider-Man and a spiritual successor to Marvel Team-Up, whose name it plays on, the series is an expansion of the Superior Spider-Man brand by Marvel Entertainment, and is notable for featuring (in continuing the storyline of Avenging Spider-Man) the first appearance of the character concept of a (then-unnamed) giant spider who turned into a young girl before being taken in by the X-Men (who in January 2023 returns as Gwen Warren / Spider-Girl, the cloned daughter of Scott Summers and the Spider-Queen).

== Format ==
Like Marvel Team-Up and Avenging Spider-Man before it, Superior Spider-Man Team-Up features a team-up format where Spider-Man is partnered with a different character each issue. It continues plot threads started in Avenging Spider-Man and runs in tandem with Dan Slott's main Superior Spider-Man title.

== Publication history ==
Superior Spider-Man Team-Up was announced in April 2013 as a part of Marvel's Superior brand expansion. Christopher Yost, writer of Superior Spider-Man Team-Up, said, "Well, in my heart when I say "Team-Up" for "Superior Spider-Man," I probably mean "Versus." In the latest "Avenging" issues, we've seen that he has a fairly contentious relationship with most of the heroes he's encountered. And with "Superior Spider-Man Team Up," that just gets bigger. I think in issue #1, he teams up with pretty much the entire Marvel Universe".

Axel Alonso, Marvel's Editor-In-Chief, added "All I can say is, they had me at the title. I grew up loving "Marvel Team-Up." Bought every issue I could get my hands on. Every month Spider-Man would team up with someone new. There was even an issue where Iceman teamed up with the Human Torch. I was like, "What the—!?"...So it didn't take much for me to sign off on the series".

== Issues ==
| Issue | Guest character(s) | Villain(s) or Threat | Writer | Artist | Release date | Notes |
|---|---|---|---|---|---|---|
| 1 | Avengers | Carrion | Chris Yost | David Lopez | July 24, 2013 | On the final page it is revealed that the Jackal and Carrion are working together. |
| 2 | Scarlet Spider | Jackal | Chris Yost | Pat Olliffe | August 14, 2013 | Crossover with Scarlet Spider. |
| 3 | Mighty Avengers | Builders, Fulmina | Robert Rodi | Mike del Mundo | September 25, 2013 | Tie-in with Infinity event. |
| 4 | Mighty Avengers | Builders, Fulmina | Robert Rodi | Mike del Mundo | October 9, 2013 | Tie-in with Infinity event. |
| 5 | Superior Six, Sun Girl | Wrecking Crew | Chris Yost | Marco Checchetto | October 23, 2013 | |
| 6 | Superior Six, Sun Girl | Wrecking Crew, Masters of Evil | Chris Yost | Marco Checchetto | November 20, 2013 | |
| 7 | Sun Girl, Lightmaster | Superior Six | Chris Yost | Marco Checchetto | December 4, 2013 | |
| 8 | Namor | Robots of Hatut Zeraze | Chris Yost | Will Sliney | December 18, 2013 | |
| 9 | Punisher, Daredevil | Spider-Minions, Green Goblin | Kevin Shinick | Marco Checchetto | January 22, 2014 | Prelude to the Goblin Nation storyline in Superior Spider-Man |
| 10 | Punisher, Daredevil | Spider-Minions, Green Goblin | Kevin Shinick | Marco Checchetto | February 19, 2014 | Prelude to the Goblin Nation storyline in Superior Spider-Man |
| 11 | Spider-Man 2099 | Green Goblin | Kevin Shinick | Marco Checchetto & Ron Frenz | March 26, 2014 | Tie-in with the Goblin Nation storyline in Superior Spider-Man |
| 12 | Doctor Octopus | Green Goblin | Kevin Shinick | Marco Checchetto & Ron Frenz | April 23, 2014 | Tie-in with the Goblin Nation storyline in Superior Spider-Man |

== Collected editions ==
| Title | Material collected | Publication date | ISBN |
|---|---|---|---|
| Superior Spider-Man Team-Up Vol. 1 - Versus | Superior Spider-Man Team-Up #1–4, Scarlet Spider (vol. 2) #20 | March 11, 2014 | 978-0785187912 |
| Superior Spider-Man Team-Up Vol. 2 - Superior Six | Superior Spider-Man Team-Up #5–12 | July 8, 2014 | 978-0785189794 |
| Superior Spider-Man Companion | Superior Spider-Man Team-Up #1-12 and Scarlet Spider (vol. 2) #20, Avenging Spider-Man #15.1, 16-22, Daredevil (vol. 3) #22, Inhumanity: Superior Spider-Man | January 3, 2019 | 978-1302915438 |
