= Fred Iger =

- Born: July 12, 1924
- Died: April 10, 2015 (aged 90)
- Occupation(s): American Comics Group owner National Periodical Publications co-owner (1948–1961)
- Spouses: Sonia Donenfeld Iger; Arlene Iger
- Children: Steven Iger, Judy Iger
- Relatives: Harry Donenfeld (father-in-law); Irwin Donenfeld (brother-in-law)

Frederick Hillel Iger (/ˈaɪɡər/; July 12, 1924 – April 10, 2015) was an American comic book publisher, associated for many years with the media figure Harry Donenfeld. (Iger's first marriage was to Donenfeld's daughter, and his second marriage was to Donenfeld's ex-daughter-in-law.) Iger was an owner of American Comics Group from 1943 to 1967, and co-owner of National Periodical Publications (otherwise known as DC Comics) from 1948–1961.

Iger is not known to be related to pioneering comic book packager Jerry Iger.

== Biography ==
=== Early career ===
Iger started out as a radio producer, working with Robert Maxwell from c. 1939 to 1941, including on The Adventures of Superman radio show.

=== Sangor Studio and American Comics Group ===
In 1940 Iger joined Benjamin W. Sangor's "Sangor Shop" until 1943. (Harry Donenfeld was co-owner of the studio during this period as well, up until the early 1960s, though he was severely incapacitated and out of the business after an accident in 1962). Sangor started American Comics Group (ACG) in 1943, and in 1947 Iger bought in (thanks to his father-in-law Donenfeld). At ACG during this period Iger edited, ordered paper, negotiated with printers, and did the taxes. His title was Business Manager and, later, Publisher.

In 1955, Iger bought out Sangor's share from his widow Francis (Sangor having died c. 1953 or 1955; sources differ) becoming sole owner of ACG for the rest of the company history.

=== DC Comics ===
Iger's father-in-law Donenfeld staked Iger again in 1948, when Iger was made a co-owner of National Periodical Publications, a major part of Donenfeld's comic book empire. Iger's association with DC ended in 1961, when the company went public.

=== Later career ===
Iger owned the commercial photo board company Film Reproductions, from 1993 to 1997.

== Personal life ==
Iger was first married to Sonia Donenfeld, sister of Irwin Donenfeld. He later married Arlene, Irwin Donenfeld's ex-wife. He died in 2015, aged 90.
