= Giggle Comics =

Publication information
- Publisher: Creston Publications; American Comics Group
- Schedule: Varied between monthly and bi-monthly
- Format: Ongoing when in publication
- Publication date: Oct. 1943 – Jan. 1955
- No. of issues: 99

Giggle Comics is an American comics anthology. It was originally published by Creston Publications, which became an imprint of American Comics Group (ACG) in 1943. Giggle Comics had many stories with funny animals, mirroring a wider trend.

== Publication history ==
Giggle Comics was published under the Creston imprint for issues #1–63; issues #64-onward were under the ACG name. The title published 99 issues, from Oct. 1943 – Jan. 1955, when it changed its name to Spencer Spook, publishing two more issues before finally being cancelled in June 1955.

== Ongoing features ==
- Superkatt — Long-running series by Dan Gordon, under the pen name "Dang." Superkatt is an anthropomorphic cat who wears a bowtie, bonnet, and diaper as a superhero costume.
