= Harry Donenfeld =

American comic book publisher

- Donenfeld at a Superman promotion on July 3, 1940, at New York World's Fair
- Born: October 17, 1893; Iași, Kingdom of Romania
- Died: February 26, 1965 (aged 71); New York City, U.S.
- Resting place: East Farmingdale, New York, U.S.
- Occupation: Publisher
- Spouse: Gussie Weinstein (m. 1918)
- Children: Irwin (1926–2004); Sonia "Peachy" (b. 1928)
- Parent: Itzhak Donenfeld
- Relatives: Charlie, Mike, and Irving (brothers)

Harry Donenfeld (/ˈdɒnənfɛld/; October 17, 1893 – February 26, 1965) was an American publisher. He is known primarily for being the co-owner with Jack Liebowitz of National Periodical Publications (later DC Comics). Donenfeld was also a founder of the Albert Einstein College of Medicine.

== Biography ==
=== Early years ===
Harry Donenfeld was born into a Jewish family in Iași, in the Kingdom of Romania, and at the age of five emigrated to the United States with his parents and his brother Irving. A few years later the family was joined by Harry's two elder brothers Charlie and Mike. Little is known of his early life, as is common with many people entering America during the days of mass immigration; but the family entered America via Ellis Island and took up residence in New York City on the Lower East Side of Manhattan.

Donenfeld spent his early life in and out of school, and later in and out of gangs, refusing to settle down or find an occupation like his brothers, who had set up a printing enterprise. Harry became a clothing salesman working in the city, saw himself as a class above the ordinary working man, and wanted a better life, preferably without hard work. After he avoided the draft in 1917, he married Gussie Weinstein (1898–1961) in 1918, and thanks to a loan from her parents he was able to open a clothing store in Newark, New Jersey.

=== Martin Press ===
When consumer spending dropped in the US in late 1920, Harry and Gussie's store fell on hard times and by early 1921 they were in debt. Harry's skills of flattery and fast-talking were of no use when the country was in economic decline and despite Gussie's best efforts the store went broke. Under pressure to find a steady income, Harry found work with his brothers' printing company, now called Martin Press, as a salesman and fourth partner. During the 1920s Martin Press saw a vast expansion in capital. It is speculated that Harry, through links with gangster Frank Costello, moved alcohol, now illegal during the prohibition, along with legitimate Canadian pulp paper across the border. By 1923 Donenfeld had managed the most important sales deal of his life, acquiring the rights for Martin Press to print six million subscription leaflets for Hearst magazines such as Cosmopolitan and Good Housekeeping. This was partly due to his new underworld contacts having close connections with Hearst newspaper salesman Moe Annenberg. The company was able to move from its earlier downtown location to a twelve-story building in the Chelsea district. 1923 also saw the emergence of the competitive business side of Donenfeld as he took control of Martin Press and forced his two older brothers out of the company, leaving Irving as a minority partner and head printer. In 1931, Donenfield changed the company name from Martin Press to Donny Press.

=== Pulp magazines ===
In 1924–25, Donenfeld, through his Elmo Press (formed in 1924), began printing Frank Armer's film magazine Screenland and art magazine Artists and Models Magazine. In 1932, Donenfeld acquired the girlie pulps Ginger Stories, Pep Stories and Snappy Stories (renamed Snappy) from W. M. Clayton, and put them out under the name of Donenfeld Magazines (D.M.). He used the names Irwin Publishing (formed 1926) and later Merwil Publishing (formed 1932) to release more magazines along the same lines: Hot Tales, Joy Stories and Juicy Tales. Elmo Press declared bankruptcy in 1932 and its assets were acquired by Merwil.

In August 1933, Donenfeld formed Tilsam Publications to produce a mixed girlie/film magazine, Real Screen Fun. In November 1933, he drafted Armer as editor to form a company called Super Magazines which ended up specializing in the mixed girlie/genre pulps Spicy Adventure, Spicy Detective, Spicy Mystery and Spicy Western. In 1934, after getting charged with obscenity, and narrowly escaping jail, Donenfeld changed the name of Super Magazines to Culture Publications. In January 1943, again trying to clean up their image, he changed the word 'Spicy' to 'Speed' in the four magazines with that name. Speed Western lasted the longest, ceasing publication in 1948.

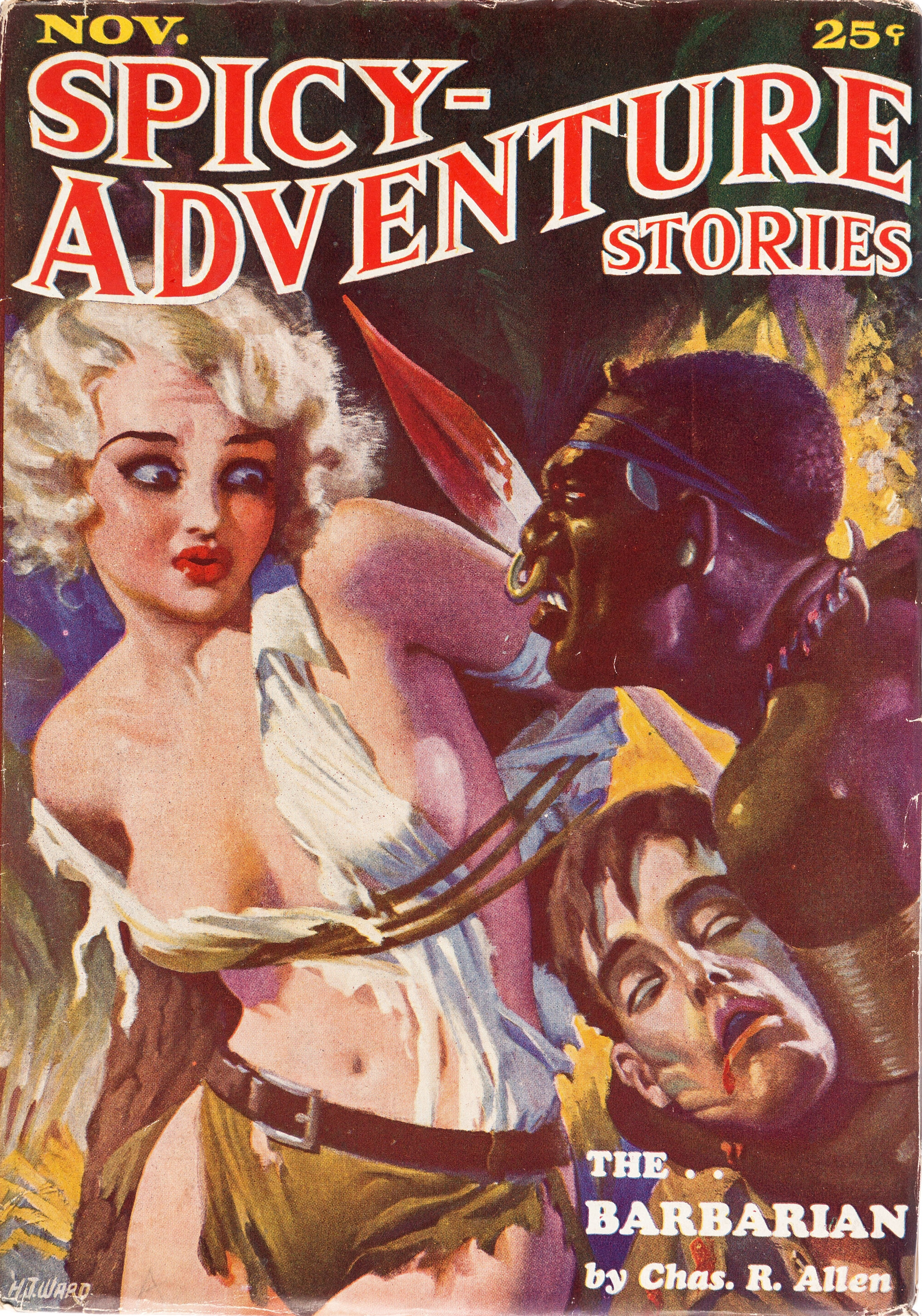

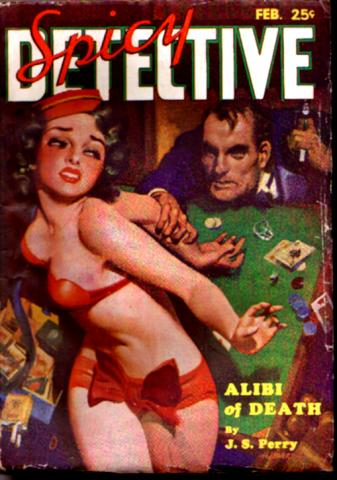

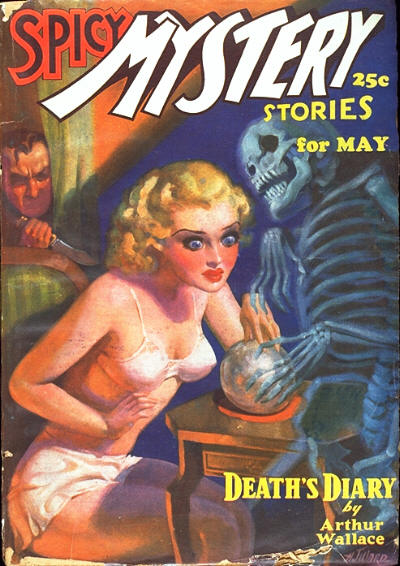

=== National Allied Publications ===
In 1929, as a favor to an old client, Julius Liebowitz, Donenfeld gave work to Julius' son, Jack. Jack and Harry had little in common, but Jack soon emerged as a man who could run finances. Whereas Harry would promise the world to clients without understanding the economic realities, Jack was bookish and ensured bills were paid on time and helped create respectability in the firm. Soon the two men were spoken of as a partnership. With the financial backing of Paul Sampliner, Irving Donenfeld as head printer, Harry as salesman and Jack Liebowitz running the finances they launched the Independent News Company in 1932. Now Donenfeld was a distributor as well as a publisher and was now no longer reliant on others to run his business.

In 1935, Major Malcolm Wheeler-Nicholson approached Independent News in a bid to relaunch his comic book New Fun, having lost his previous backers due to poor sales and debts. Donenfeld accepted to distribute the comic but with a heavy loss of rights for Wheeler-Nicholson. The major produced two more titles to be handled by Independent News, New Comics and Detective Comics (which would later see the first appearance of Batman), now under the banner of Detective Comics Inc., in which Wheeler-Nicholson was forced to take Donenfeld and Liebowitz as partners. In 1938, Donenfeld sued Wheeler-Nicholson for nonpayment and Detective Comics Inc. went into bankruptcy. Donenfeld then bought up the company and Wheeler-Nicholson's National Allied Publications in their entirety as part of the action.

The fourth publication under National Allied Publications would be Action Comics (1938). Issue #1 introduced the superhero, Superman, created by artist Joe Shuster and writer Jerry Siegel. Donenfeld was initially repelled by the seemingly ridiculous fantasy of the character and ordered it never appear on the cover again. However, the property proved tremendously popular and profitable enough to change his mind by issue 7 to make "Superman" the title's feature. As such, Donenfeld enjoyed not only healthy comic book sales, but also in merchandising such as toys, costumes and even a radio show featuring the character. At the end of 1941 Donenfeld's comic businesses took in $2.6 million. Shuster and Siegel had sold the rights for the character to National Allied Publications, so as Donenfeld became rich, they continued on flat employee fees. Legal actions between the creative pair and National Allied Publications for compensation would continue for decades to come, but Donenfeld allowed Liebowitz to handle this side of his empire.

=== American Comics Group ===
Donenfeld also owned a stake in a competitor comics publisher, American Comics Group (ACG). A gin rummy and traveling partner of Benjamin W. Sangor, in 1943 Donenfeld helped Sangor start ACG, which was published until 1967. (ACG was also distributed by Donenfeld's Independent News.)

=== Leader News ===
He also founded the company Leader News Company in 1939, in conjunction with Paul Sampliner, Frank Armer and Michael Estrow, to distribute the company's pulp magazine line, later branding under the moniker Trojan Magazines. The company later distributed titles by EC Comics, as well as Mainline Publications and Mikeross Publications. The company went defunct in 1956.

=== Injury and death ===
In 1962, the week before he was set to marry his second wife, Donenfeld fell, injuring his head, which resulted in a lack of memory and speech from which he never recovered. He died at a care home in New York City in 1965, and is buried in Mount Ararat Cemetery, East Farmingdale, New York.

Donenfeld was posthumously named in 1985 as one of the honorees by DC Comics in the company's 50th-anniversary publication Fifty Who Made DC Great.

== Family ==
Harry's son Irwin Donenfeld was born in 1926, and worked for the firm from 1948 to c. 1968, holding the titles of editorial director and executive vice president. Harry's daughter Sonia (known as "Peachie") was born in 1927. She was married to Fred Iger in 1947, had 2 children and the marriage ended in divorce after 15 years.
