= Lightmaster =

- Lightmaster as depicted in Superior Spider-Man Team-Up #5 (October 2013). Art by Marco Checchetto (penciller/inker), Rachelle Rosenberg (colorist), and Joe Caramagna (letterer).

Publication information
- Publisher: Marvel Comics
- First appearance: Peter Parker, the Spectacular Spider-Man #3 (Feb. 1977)
- Created by: Jim Shooter; Sal Buscema

In-story information
- Alter ego: Dr. Edward Lansky
- Team affiliations: Masters of Evil; One World Church; Empire State University
- Abilities: Power suit grants: Light manipulation Flight; Construct generation

Lightmaster (Edward Lansky) is a supervillain appearing in American comic books published by Marvel Comics.

== Publication history ==
Lightmaster first appeared in Peter Parker, the Spectacular Spider-Man #3 and was created by Jim Shooter and Sal Buscema.

== Fictional character biography ==
Edward Lansky was born in New York City. He is a physics professor and vice-chancellor of Empire State University who turns to crime to prevent budget cuts that would have negatively affected the university. As the Lightmaster, Lansky employs Kraven the Hunter and Tarantula to help him kidnap several government officials who had initiated the budget cuts. The three are defeated by Spider-Man, who foils the plot and electrifies Lightmaster's suit.

Spider-Man electrocuting him inadvertently transforms Lightmaster into a being made of unstable energy who is dependent on constant exposure to light to survive. Seeking revenge on Spider-Man, Lightmaster accidentally causes a blackout in New York City and disappears into another dimension. Lightmaster eventually restores his body by harnessing Quasar's quantum bands, despite Spider-Man's interference.

Lightmaster is hired by the One World Church to distribute the Façade Virus, which the OWC intends to use to turn everyone blue and thus eliminate racial divides. Cable subverts his control and instead turns everyone pink for two days before disabling the virus.

During the Secret Invasion storyline, Lightmaster appears as member of Hood's crime syndicate and attacks a Skrull force. He accompanies Hood in attacking Mister Negative after he refuses to relinquish control of Chinatown's criminal operations.

Lightmaster later teams up with the Wrecking Crew to target Alchemax's latest device, which would be able to sync with Lightmaster's powers. He and the Wrecking Crew encounter Superior Spider-Man (Doctor Octopus' mind in Spider-Man's body) and the Superior Six. Lightmaster receives help from Absorbing Man, Blackout, Mister Hyde, Titania, and Whirlwind to fight Superior Spider-Man and the Superior Six as an incarnation of the Masters of Evil. Additionally, it is revealed that Lightmaster is the father of Sun Girl (Selah Burke).

== Powers and abilities ==
Edward Lansky created a unique special body suit with a padded inner lining, a power armor suit which utilized "gravity-pump circuitry" to allow him to manipulate photons for a variety of effects. With it, he could fly; emit blinding flashes of light; create semi-solid, low-mass constructs; create concussive beams of force; or create brass knuckles to increase the power of his punches. The suit could absorb fairly large amounts of electrical energy without damaging the wearer. A sufficient amount of energy caused the circuitry to overload and converted Lansky's body into unstable living energy.

Lansky is skilled in the field of physics with a gifted intellect, and has a Ph.D. in physics.
