= Fatman the Human Flying Saucer =

Comic book superhero

Publication information
- Publisher: Lightning Comics
- First appearance: Fatman, the Human Flying Saucer #1 (April 1967)
- Created by: C. C. Beck and Otto Binder

In-story information
- Alter ego: Van Crawford
- Abilities: Able to turn into a flying saucer Fire energy beams while in this form

Fatman the Human Flying Saucer is a comic book superhero created by artist C. C. Beck and writer Otto Binder in the 1960s.

Beck and Binder created Fatman long after Beck's popular creation Captain Marvel was canceled partly due to a copyright infringement suit with DC Comics.

== Overview ==
Fatman's costume was green and yellow with a yellow flying saucer emblem on the chest. Fatman was fat and could change into a human flying saucer. His comic ran for only three issues and was published by Lightning Comics, an almost equally short-lived company. Fatman comics were produced in small numbers and are considered valuable because of Beck's artwork and their rarity.

Van Crawford became Fatman after coming to the aid of an alien flying saucer. The saucer itself turned out to be a shapeshifting alien, who rewarded Crawford by giving him a chocolate drink with the ability to transform him into a human flying saucer. Being a wealthy man, like many superheroes of the era, Crawford decided to use this newfound power to become a superhero. He teamed up with a teenage sidekick, Tin Man, who could turn into a robot.

== In popular culture ==
Fatman was mentioned on the second episode of series 2 of the British panel show Question Time in 2022.

In Antarctic Press's Exciting Comics #31 (March 2023), Herbie (The Fat Fury) Popnecker and Fatman the Human Flying Saucer team up to rescue a stolen recipe belonging to Miss Horatio Huffnagel. On the way, they fight old foes, battle new foes, and meet a couple of nostalgic characters. written by John Holland, with art by Larry Guidry.

In November 2024, Fatman guest-starred in issue #9 of Tomorrow Girl, a title published by Antarctic Press written by John Holland, with art by Ben Dunn and Larry Guidry, alongside Herbie Popnecker and Atomic Mouse.
