= Herbie Popnecker =

Comic book character

Herbie
- Herbie, from Forbidden Worlds #114 (September 1963) by Ogden Whitney

Publication information
- Publisher: American Comics Group
- First appearance: Forbidden Worlds #73 (Dec. 1958)
- Created by: Richard E. Hughes and Ogden Whitney

In-story information
- Alter ego: Herbie Popnecker
- Notable aliases: Fat Fury
- Abilities: Flying; Invisibility; Ability to talk to animals; Time travel

Herbie Popnecker is a fictional comic book character who first appeared in Forbidden Worlds #73 in December 1958, published by American Comics Group. He was created by Richard E. Hughes (using the pseudonym "Shane O'Shea") and Ogden Whitney.

== Description ==
Herbie is an atypical hero – a short, obese, unemotional, terse, unstylish boy who is nonetheless nearly omnipotent. Deriving some of his powers from genetics and some from magical lollipops he obtains from a salesman from a mysterious realm called "the Unknown", Herbie can carry on detailed conversations with animals and sometimes even inanimate objects (who all know him by name), quickly reach any location (including other galaxies) by walking through the sky, become invisible, cast spells, summon spirits from other dimensions, quickly dispatch all enemies with ease, and travel through time. Despite his age, appearance and terse personality, he is irresistible to women.

== Publication history ==
Herbie made several appearances in Forbidden Worlds, in issues #73, #94, #110, #114, and #116—the final two issues with Herbie featured on the cover. Herbie also made a cameo appearance—albeit very much out of character—in Unknown Worlds #20, published in 1961.

Herbie received his own title, Herbie, in April 1964. The series ran for twenty-three issues until February 1967, shortly before the demise of American Comics Group.

== Fictional character biography ==
Herbie's parents are unaware of his great powers and fame. His mother is reasonably supportive; however, his father, Pincus Popnecker, repeatedly refers to him as a "little fat nothing" and longs for a more ambitious son. Pincus believes himself to be a financial genius and destined for greatness. Despite his wholesome and conservative "1950s dad" appearance, he constantly engages in foolish schemes, inevitably fails in spectacular fashion and winds up in varying levels of trouble. Herbie is always obliged to help him in each circumstance, though the clueless Pincus never notices this and always takes the credit for victory himself.

Herbie is practically always shown with a lollipop, and lollipops are the main subjects of several stories. Herbie can "bop" adversaries with his lollipops, immediately defeating them. Herbie intimidates his adversaries by asking them rhetorically, "You want I should bop you with this here lollipop?", which almost always results in them backing down.

=== Fat Fury ===
In Herbie #8 (March 1965), Herbie feels a need to become a costumed superhero; but, after failing superhero school, he creates the Fat Fury by donning full-body red underwear with a drop seat, a blue cape, a blue plastic mask, and a plunger on his head. He is bare-footed. Herbie's obtuse father then begins to wish that his "little fat nothing" son could be more like the Fat Fury.

As the Fat Fury, Herbie does not have any powers beyond the many he had before donning the costume. Although Herbie travels back in time, the Fat Fury never does. The Fat Fury was featured in even-numbered Herbie comics from #8 to #22.

== Powers ==
- Hypnotic eyes that can defeat opponents by staring
- Famous throughout history and able to depend on the help of others
- By talking to animals, able to gather information and use animals' abilities
- Powerful lollipops provide superhuman strength and other special abilities
- Punching, often very rapidly
- Time travel (using a special lollipop and a grandfather clock)
- Indestructibility—Herbie is often unaware he is even being attacked
- Fly at great speed, but do so by walking upright. In addition to being able to walk on air and through space, he can walk underwater. Herbie can also fly underground and often breaks through walls
- Invisibility—early on, Herbie could become invisible, but stopped using that power by the third Herbie issue
- Magic—visiting "the Unknown", a mysterious spirit world which supplies him with his lollipops

== Recurring gags ==
There are many recurring gags in Herbie comics:

- Herbie speaks very little. He is terse, leaving out many words.
- Herbie is unemotional, in spite of everything around him, understating everything he says.
- Women of all ages are strongly attracted to Herbie.
- Famous people and world leaders all know Herbie by name and consult with him on a variety of matters, yet his parents are completely unaware of this.
- Herbie encounters many look-alikes, most of whom he thinks are ugly.
- Although very obese, Herbie does not eat much, especially in later issues.
- Herbie is always found sleeping, much to the dismay of his father.
- Herbie wears many disguises, most of which are absurd.
- Herbie sometimes happens to have just the right item for the job: marshmallows in King Arthur's time, worms to drop in Mao's mouth, a bicycle pump in his pocket, or a blowtorch in the frozen north. In a kind of meta-humor, Herbie's response in these situations is often "Never mind where I got it from, either."

== Critical analysis ==
In a review of the Dark Horse Comics collections Herbie: Volume One and Herbie: Volume Two, The New York Times described Hughes' Herbie Popnecker as,

...a corpulent kid with half-lidded eyes, thick glasses and a hideous bowl cut. His father calls him a "little fat nothing", not realizing that Herbie is actually a colossus striding across the cultural landscape of his era. With the aid of his super-empowering lollipops, Herbie punches out Sonny Liston, confronts Fidel Castro and gets sent on a secret mission by U Thant. Hughes took a while to perfect his stories' tone of deadpan absurdity, but Whitney's slightly stiff, matter-of-fact artwork improves the gags by understating them.

Alan Moore has declared Herbie his favorite comic book.

== Collections and revivals ==
In the 1990s, there were some attempts to revive Herbie. A-Plus Comics (which had purchased the American Comics Group reprint rights) published six black-and-white issues of reprints in 1991. Dark Horse Comics published two issues of a planned twelve in 1992, the first with a new story by John Byrne. Flaming Carrot Comics #31 (1994) featured an appearance by Herbie (words and pictures by Bob Burden). America's Comic Group (a publisher affiliated with A+ Comics) published a new story written by Roger Broughton with artwork by Dan Day.

In 2008, Dark Horse Comics announced that they would reprint the original Herbie stories in a series of hardcover archive volumes. The first Herbie Archives came out in August 2008 (ISBN 978-1-59307-987-1) and collects Herbie stories from Forbidden Worlds #73, 94, 110, 114, 116, Unknown Worlds #20, and Herbie #1–5. The second came out in December 2008 (ISBN 978-1-59582-216-1), and collects issues #6–14. The third and final volume came out in April 2009 (ISBN 978-1-59582-302-1), and collects issues #15–23.

In Antarctic Press’ Exciting Comics #31 (Released Mar 1, 2023), Herbie (The Fat Fury) Popnecker and Fatman the Human Flying Saucer team up to rescue a stolen recipe belonging to Miss Horatio Huffnagel. On the way, they fight old foes, battle new foes and meet a couple of nostalgic characters. written by John Holland, with art by Larry Guidry.

In November 2024, Herbie guest-starred in issue #9 of Tomorrow Girl, a title published by Antarctic Press written by John Holland, with art by Ben Dunn and Larry Guidry, alongside Fatman the Human Flying Saucer and Atomic Mouse. Tomorrow Girl #9 also features an unpublished, 9-page Herbie story entitled "Herbie & The Humperdink Ray" written by Richard Hughes and art by Larry Guidry.

Tomorrow Girl #10, released in January 2025, includes several short back-up strips featuring Herbie.

== Awards ==
Herbie comics received the Alley Award for Best Humor Comic Book 1964 and 1965. The Herbie Archives received the Eisner Award for Best Humor Publication in 2009.
