= Screenland =

American film magazine

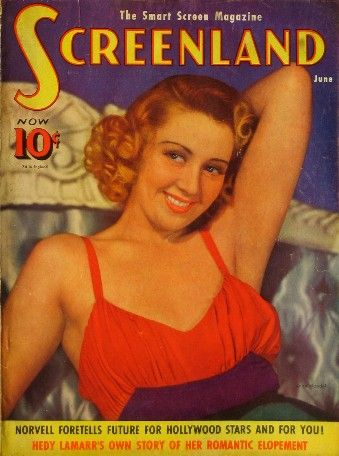
- Joan Blondell on June 1939 cover
- Categories: Film; Entertainment
- First issue: 1920
- Final issue: 1971
- Company: Screenland Publishing Company (1920–1923); Magazine Builders; Henry Publishing; Pines Publications (1952–1971)
- Country: United States
- Language: English

Screenland was a monthly American magazine about movies, published between September 1920 and June 1971, when it merged with Silver Screen. In the September 1952 issue, the name changed to Screenland plus TV-Land.

== History ==
It was established in Los Angeles, California, with Myron Zobel as the editor in 1920 by Screenland Publishing Company.

Frederick James Smith became the editor in 1923 when it moved to Cooperstown, New York. In 1923, the magazine reported a love affair between Evelyn Brent and Douglas Fairbanks, resulting in legal threats, and a retraction.

In 1924, the magazine was taken over by Magazine Builders; Myron Zobel was the publisher and Frank Armer was the treasurer. At that same time, Harry Donenfeld (through his Elmo Press formed in 1924) did the printing of the magazine.

One magazine-collector site credits, without attribution, one Paul Hunter, "with rescuing Screenland magazine for John Cuneo back in 1932."

In October 1952, Ned Pines' Standard Magazines, (Note: Also known as Affiliated Magazines or Popular Library) an imprint of Pines Publications, purchased Silver Screen and Screenland from the Henry Publishing company. Pines announced in June 1954 that he was suspending publication with the August 1954 issue, citing production and distribution costs. The magazine continued publication through 1971, however.

== See also ==
- Photoplay
