= Sun Girl (Marvel Comics) =

- Sun Girl #1 (August 1948). Cover art by Ken Bald.

Publication information
- Publisher: Marvel Comics
- First appearance: Sun Girl #1 (August 1948)
- Created by: Ken Bald (artist)

In-story information
- Alter ego: Mary Mitchell
- Partnerships: Human Torch
- Abilities: Good acrobat Expert martial artist Wields a sunbeam ray gun

Sun Girl is the name of two superheroines appearing in American comic books published by Marvel Comics.

== Publication history ==
The first Sun Girl was created by artist Ken Bald and an unidentified writer. She first appeared in Sun Girl #1 (August 1948), published by Marvel's 1940s precursor, Timely Comics. Sun Girl starred in a namesake three-issue series cover-dated August to December 1948.

The character subsequently co-starred in stories of the original Human Torch in The Human Torch #32-35 (Sept. 1948 - March 1949), Captain America Comics #69 (November 1948), Sub-Mariner Comics #29 (November 1948), and Marvel Mystery Comics #88-91 (October 1948-April 1949). She additionally starred in a solo story each in the first two of those Marvel Mystery issues. The Human Torch-Sun Girl story "The Ray of Madness" from The Human Torch #33 (November 1948) was reprinted decades later in Marvel's Giant-Size Avengers #1 (August 1974). Sun Girl appears in flashback in the final two issues of the four-issue miniseries Saga of the Original Human Torch (April–July 1990)

A new Sun Girl debuted in Superior Spider-Man Team-Up #1 and appeared as one of the main characters in the Marvel NOW! relaunch of the New Warriors.

== Fictional character biography ==
=== Mary Mitchell ===
A personal secretary for Jim Hammond, the original Human Torch, during the post-war 1940s, Mary Mitchell falls in love with him and becomes his partner as well as his sidekick after Toro leaves to tend to his ailing foster mother. In The Human Torch #32 (September 1948), Sun Girl helps the Torch clear the name of an innocent man accused of murder charges, by exposing the real culprit. Later, they convince a retired doctor to perform surgery on a little girl who accidentally swallowed a diamond hidden in a lollypop. Mary leaves to go on her own adventures after that. She carries a solar ray gun. She occasionally teams up with heroes besides the Torch, such as Captain America. After Toro returns she resumes her position as secretary and researcher.

During the Secret Wars storyline, Sun Girl appears as a resident of Valhalla Villas, a retirement home for ex-heroes and ex-villains in Miami. She temporarily regains her youth during the incursion between Earth-616 and Earth-1610.

=== Selah Burke ===
Sun Girl
- Superior Spider-Man Team-Up #6 (November 2013). Art by Marco Checchetto; Colors by Rachelle Rosenberg

Publication information
- Publisher: Marvel Comics
- First appearance: Superior Spider-Man Team-Up #1 (July 2013)
- Created by: Marco Checchetto (artist); Christopher Yost (writer)

In-story information
- Alter ego: Selah Burke
- Team affiliations: New Warriors
- Abilities: Proficient engineer Wields dual-wielding pistols and other light-based weapons Suit with a harness that grants: Flight; Light blast projection

A new Sun Girl appears as one of the heroes temporarily possessed by the Carrion virus after she comes in contact with William Allen. Sun Girl is attacked by The Superior Spider-Man (Doctor Octopus' mind in Peter Parker's body). The Superior Spider-Man cures Sun Girl of the Carrion virus. Her identity is later revealed to be Selah Burke, the daughter of Lightmaster. Sun Girl rescues Spider-Man after he is captured by the Superior Six, but the two part on bad terms, with Sun Girl thinking that Superior Spider-Man is a "jerk" due to his condescending attitude and insane brainwashing scheme.

Selah next appeared in issue #1 of the 2014 New Warriors relaunch, where she rescues the Morlocks from an attack by the Evolutionaries. When offered the opportunity to walk away by these attackers (as they have no intention of going after humans), she opts to sacrifice herself to allow the Morlocks to escape. Haechi steps in and uses his energy-absorbing powers to shield her. Speedball and Justice enter the scene, which causes the attackers to flee.

Selah briefly is placed under a curse where she has no memory of her previous life in issue #13 of the 2018 Storybrooke arch where she assumes the name Briarrose Dangel

== Powers and abilities ==
Mary Mitchell is a good acrobat and is an expert in both Judo and Jiu Jutsu. She also wields a Sunbeam Ray Gun which produces a bright blast of light as well as a lariat which she keeps in her emergency pouch.

Selah Burke is a brilliant engineer who creates a suit with a harness that grants her flight and the ability to project light blasts. The suit is later modified by the Superior Spider-Man. She also wields pistols capable of firing concussive blasts. She developed and constructed her gear and weapons based on her father's light manipulation technology.
