= Buster Bunny (comics) =

Publication information
- Publisher: Standard Comics
- First appearance: Buster Bunny #1 (November 1949)

In-story information
- Species: Rabbit

Buster Bunny is a fictional character who had appeared in comic books from Standard Comics starting in 1949; this character is not related to the character of the same name from Tiny Toon Adventures.

== Overview ==
Buster is depicted as a young anthropomorphic white rabbit (later gray) dressed in a red sweater and black trousers. His eagerness for fun and excitement sometimes lands him into trouble. He lives with his parents and his cousin Billy. He enjoys camping (right next to the house, though, so he can go inside and eat), and going to the movies (as long as someone else is paying, because he never has any money).

Buster starred in 16 issues of his own title, from November 1949 to October 1953; he also appeared as a backup feature in comics starring Supermouse.
