= Atomic Mouse =

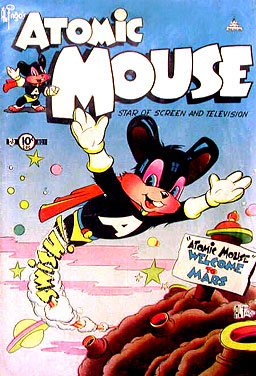
- Atomic Mouse #1 (March 1953). Cover art by Al Fago

Publication information
- Publisher: Charlton Comics
- First appearance: Atomic Mouse #1 (Mar. 1953)
- Created by: Al Fago

In-story information
- Abilities: Flight, super strength

Atomic Mouse is a talking animal superhero created in 1953 by Al Fago for Charlton Comics.

== Publication history ==
Created by writer-artist Al Fago, Atomic Mouse debuted in Charlton Comics' Atomic Mouse #1 (cover-dated March 1953). The series ran 52 issues through cover-date February 1963. The Grand Comics Database notes, "Overstreet has listed #53-54, but there is no evidence they actually exist."

From 1961 to 1962, Charlton published an additional five issues, vol. 2, #11-16, containing reprinted material and used as promotional giveaways. Another reprint issue, Atomic Mouse vol. 3, #1 (Dec. 1984) followed, as did a three-issue fourth volume (#10-12, Sept. 1985 – January 1986).

Writer Mike Curtis and penciler Charles Ettinger revamped the character in Shanda Fantasy Arts' SFA's Atomic Mouse, which ran for three issues published from 2001 to 2004. The same publisher issues the one-shot publication SFA's Atomic Mouse vs. Power Jack in 2009.

In November 2024, Atomic Mouse guest-starred in issue #9 of Tomorrow Girl, a title published by Antarctic Press written by John Holland, with art by Ben Dunn and Larry Guidry, alongside Herbie Popnecker and Fatman the Human Flying Saucer.

Fago went on to create Atomic Rabbit (a.k.a. Atomic Bunny) and Atom the Cat.

== Fictional character biography ==
Cimota Mouse (his first name being "atomic" spelled backwards) is an ordinary mouse whom an evil wizard shrinks to the size of an atom. In that microscopic realm, Professor Invento gives U-235 pills that grant Cimota superpowers, which he uses to fight for justice against the evil Count Gatto.
