= Forbidden Worlds =

American comic appearing from 1951 to 1967

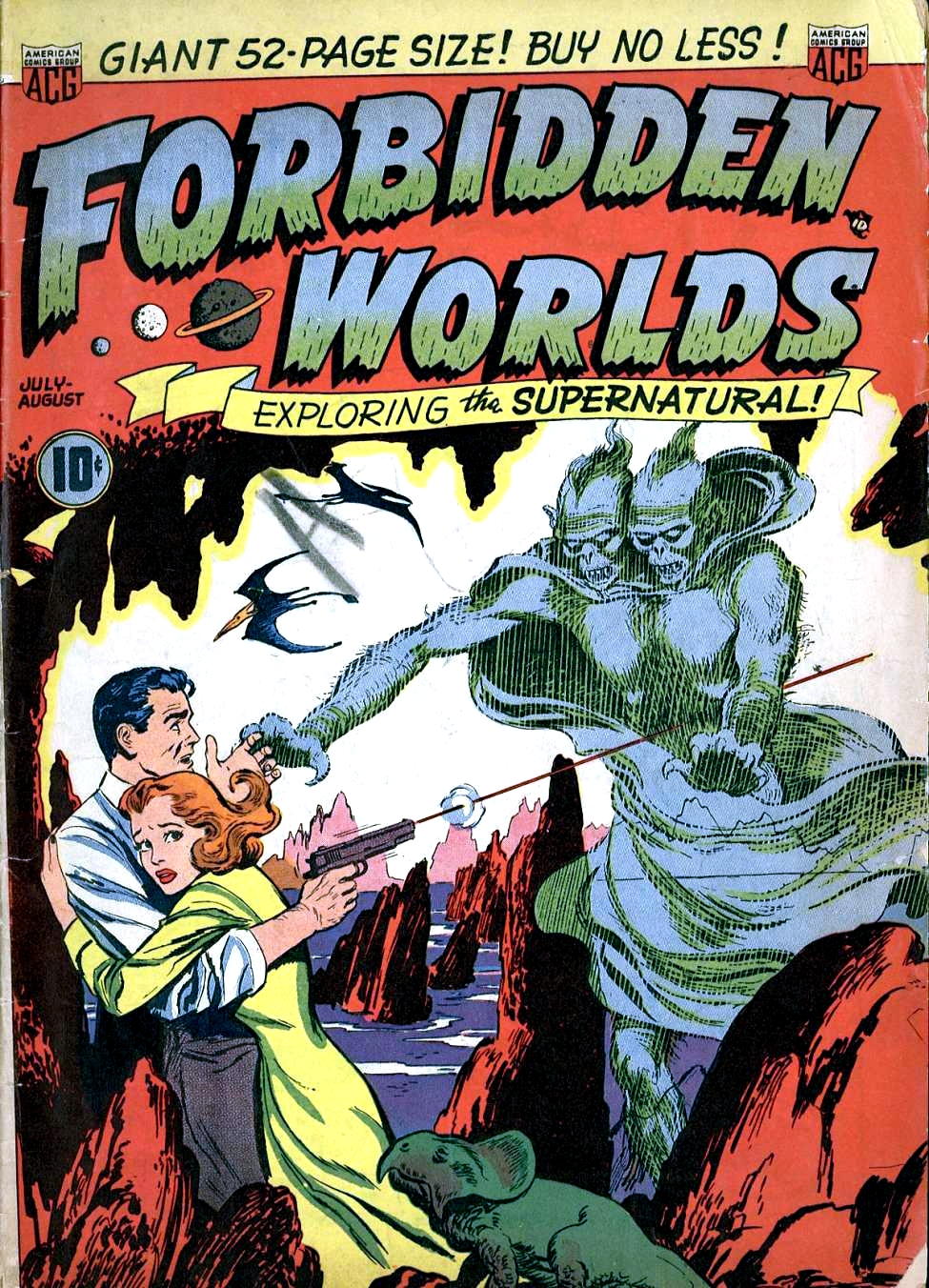
- Forbidden Worlds #1 (Oct. 1951), Cover art by Ken Bald

Publication information
- Publisher: American Comics Group
- Schedule: Varied between monthly and bi-monthly
- Format: Ongoing when in publication
- Publication date: July/Aug. 1951 - Aug. 1967
- No. of issues: 145

Creative team
- Written by: Richard E. Hughes
- Artist(s): Harry Lazarus

Forbidden Worlds was a fantasy comic from the American Comics Group, which won the 1964 Alley Award for Best Regularly Published Fantasy Comic. It published 145 issues between July/August 1951 to August 1967.

== Publication history ==
Forbidden Worlds, a 52-page comic with the initial subtitle "Exploring the Supernatural!", debuted in October 1951. Due to pressure from the 1954 Senate subcommittee hearings on the dangers of comic books, the comic changed its title (and focus) to Young Heroes from March 1955 to June/July 1955 (publishing issues #35–37). However, in August 1955, Forbidden Worlds reappeared with (another) issue #35 and the altered subtitle "Stories of Strange Adventure".

Issue #101 (Jan./Feb. 1962) saw a price raise from 10 cents to 12 cents. From #108 on, Forbidden Worlds became sporadically bimonthly instead of strictly monthly. #114 and #116 were special issues called Forbidden Worlds presents Herbie, featuring Herbie Popnecker, who first appeared in Forbidden Worlds #73 (December 1958). Issues #125 to #138 all featured Magicman on the cover. The final issue was #145 (August 1967), when the company stopped producing newsstand comic books.

Most of the contents of Forbidden Worlds, from 1957 to 1967, including the features "Magicman" and "Herbie", was written by Richard E. Hughes under a plethora of pseudonyms. Artists who contributed included Pete Costanza for Magicman and Ogden Whitney for Herbie. Other occasional contributors include Hy Eisman, John Buscema, Paul Reinman, and Chic Stone.

An October 1, 1952, "Statement of the Ownership, Management, and Circulation" published in ACG's Forbidden Worlds #15 gave the publisher's name as Preferred Publications, Inc., 8 Lord St., Buffalo, New York" and the owners as Preferred Publications and "B. W. Sangor, 7 West 81st Street, New York, N. Y." The editor was listed as Richard E.Hughes, 120 West 183rd St., New York, N. Y." and the business manager as "Frederick H. Iger, 50 Beverly Road, Great Neck, Great Neck, L. I., N. Y."
