= Ned Pines =

American publisher (1905–1990)

- Born: Noah Lewis Pines; December 10, 1905; Malden, Massachusetts, U.S.
- Died: May 14, 1990 (aged 84); Paris, France
- Occupation: Publishing executive
- Known for: Standard Comics; Pines Publications; Thrilling Publications
- Spouse(s): Jacquelyn Sanger (married 1938–1959); Maxine Firestone (married 1967)
- Relatives: Benjamin W. Sangor (father-in-law)

Noah Lewis "Ned" Pines (December 10, 1905 – May 14, 1990) was an American publisher of pulp magazines, comic books, and paperback books, active from at least 1928 to 1971. His Standard Comics imprint was the parent company of the comic-book lines Nedor Publishing and Better Publications, the most prominent character of which was the superhero the Black Terror. Pines also established the paperback book publisher Popular Library, which eventually merged with Fawcett Publications.

== Biography ==
Pines was born in Malden, Massachusetts, the son of Joseph and Dora Goldes Pines. He had two brothers, Robert A. Pines, who would work with Ned in publishing, and Kermit L. Pines, who became a doctor; and a sister, Lillian. Their father, a native of Russia, had settled in the Boston, Massachusetts, area and founded the Pines Rubber Company, of which he was president for 26 years before retiring sometime prior to his death in 1930, at age 57, at his home in Brooklyn, New York City, New York.

Pines was president and owner of the Manhattan company Pines Publications, which he established in 1928, remaining as president until 1961. He published pulp magazines and other periodicals under a variety of company names, including Thrilling Publications, with pulp magazines that included Thrilling Western, The Lone Eagle, and Thrilling Wonder Stories. His Collegian Press, Inc. bought the existing magazine College Humor from Dell Publishing by the mid-1930s, publishing it through 1942. In mid-1936, Pines refuted a claim by the Cartoonists Guild of America that College Humor had not agreed to pay the $15 Guild minimum, payable within 30 days, for drawings by Guild members. In October 1952, his Standard Magazines purchased Silver Screen and Screenland from the Henry Publishing company.

Pines added comic books to the mix in 1939 with the publishing imprint Standard Comics, which became in turn the parent company of two comic-book lines: Better Publications and Nedor Publishing. Collectors and historians sometimes refer to them collectively as "Standard/Better/Nedor".

In 1942, Pines founded the paperback book publisher Popular Library, remaining its president through 1966 and serving as chairman through 1968. He retired in 1971 and continued as a consultant. Popular Library was distributed through the American News Company until that distributor's demise in 1957.

Pines was, additionally, announced as chairman of the board of Eastern Life Insurance on June 1, 1960, after having been a director of the company for 11 years. He remained in that position through 1971. Pines was also a member of the coordinating committee of the Columbia University Institute of Research from 1945 to 1947; on the advisory board of Commentary magazine; and, from 1970 to 1974, on the board of directors of the Merce Cunningham Dance Federation. He was a leader of the publishers' division of the Federation of Jewish Philanthropies and United Jewish Appeal in December 1949 when he was elected to the board of director of the New York Guild for the Jewish Blind, and was made a life trustee of the Federation in 1968. As of at least mid-1960, he was a member of the board of the Magazine Publishers Association.

Pines' brother Robert, who died of a heart attack at age 52 on August 8, 1949, was a 1918 Columbia University graduate who practiced law from 1921 to 1935 before becoming editor and publisher of College Humor magazine; in 1941, he became editor and publisher of See magazine. He was also a director of Standard Magazines, Inc., Better Publications, Inc. and Eastern Life Insurance.

Pines, who had homes in Paris, France; Manhattan; and East Hampton, New York, died at the American Hospital of Paris after a brief illness.

== Personal life ==
Pines' first wife was the former Jacquelyn Sanger (as her last name is spelled in The New York Times) of Chicago, Illinois, the daughter of comic-book publisher Ben Sangor. The couple had two daughters: Judith Ann Bernard, born July 25, 1939, and Susan, born May 8, 1942. The family lived at 965 Fifth Avenue during this the time. By mid-1963, when Judith announced her engagement to Anthony Edward Marks, a Columbia University doctoral candidate in anthropology, Pines and his wife were separated or divorced, he living at 605 Park Avenue and Jacquelyn at 767 Fifth Avenue. Pines was later married to Maxine Firestone and had two stepsons, Anthony and Kenneth Michaelman.

In 1941, Pines was an usher at the wedding of Ruth Feinberg, daughter of State Senator Benjamin F. Feinberg.
