= American Comics Group =

American comic book publisher

- Founded: 1939; 87 years ago
- Founder: Benjamin W. Sangor
- Defunct: 1967; 59 years ago
- Country of origin: United States
- Headquarters location: 45 West 45th Street, New York City
- Key people: Richard E. Hughes; Fred Iger; Harry Donenfeld
- Publication types: Comic books
- Fiction genres: Superheroes, science fiction, horror, crime, mystery, romance
- Imprints: B & I Publishing Co., Inc. B. & M. Distributing Co., Inc. Best Syndicated Features, Inc. Creston Publications Corp. Culver Publications; Custom Comics, Inc. La Salle Publishing Co. Michel Publications, Inc. Milt Gross, Inc. Modern Store Publications; Modern Store Publishing; Preferred Publications, Inc. Regis Publications, Inc. Scope Magazines, Inc. Titan Publishing Co. Inc.

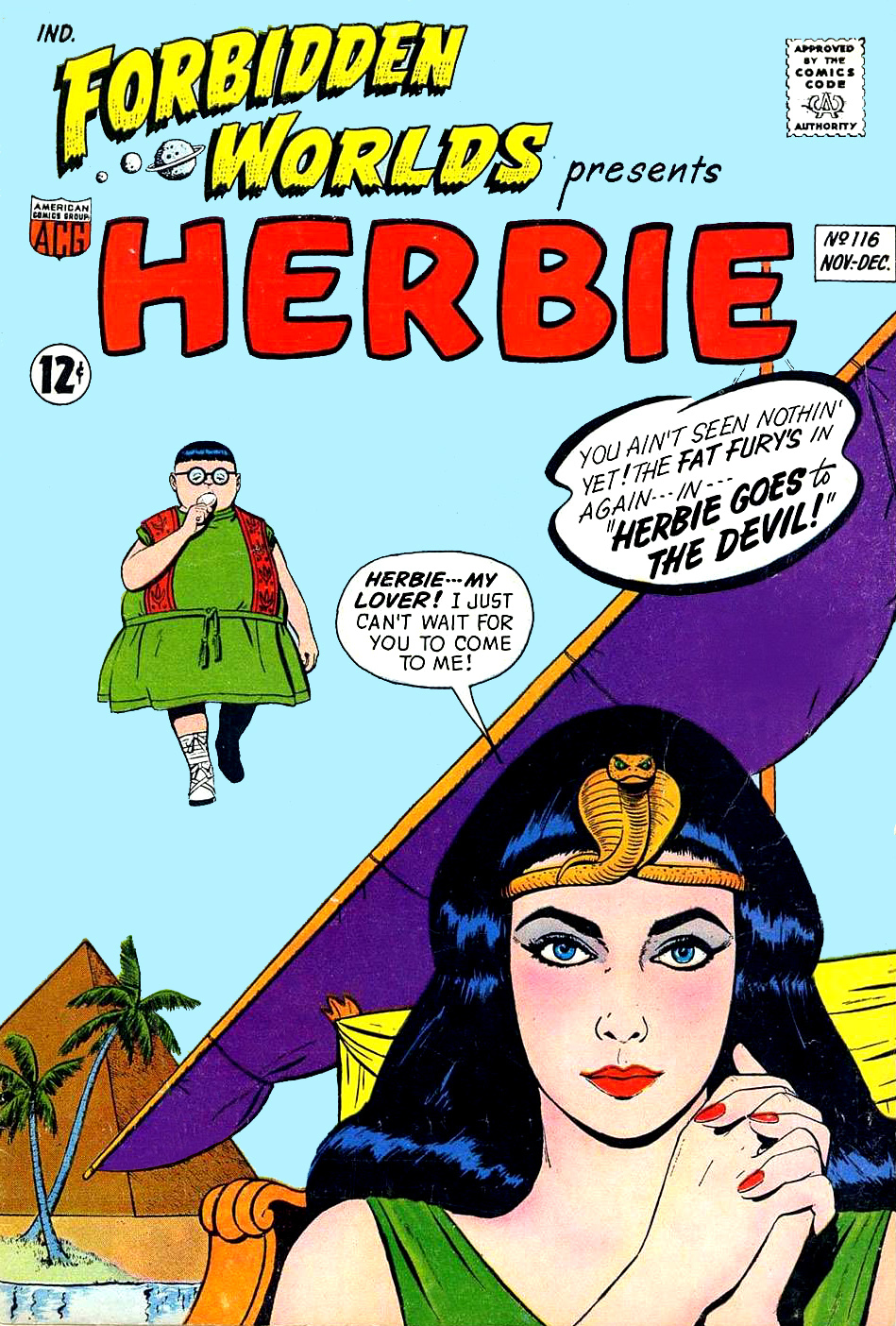
Forbidden Worlds featuring Herbie Popnecker, one of ACG's most successful titles. Artwork by Ogden Whitney.

American Comics Group (ACG) was an American comic book publisher started in 1939 and existing under the ACG name from 1943 to 1967. It published the medium's first ongoing horror-comics title, Adventures into the Unknown. ACG's best-known character was the 1960s satirical humor hero Herbie Popnecker, who starred for a time in Forbidden Worlds. Herbie would later get his own title and be turned into a superhero called the Fat Fury.

Founded by Benjamin W. Sangor, ACG was co-owned by Fred Iger from 1948 to 1967. Iger's father-in-law, Harry Donenfeld, head of National Periodical Publications (later known as DC Comics), was also a co-owner in the early 1960s (though Donenfeld was severely incapacitated and out of the business after an accident in 1962). ACG was distributed by Independent News Company, which also distributed by (and was part of the same company as) DC.

== History ==
=== Origins ===
The company evolved out of a company owned by Sangor. In the mid-1930s, Sangor and Richard E. Hughes began to produce a short-lived prepackaged comics supplement for newspapers. In 1939, the Sangor Shop (as it was informally known) began producing comics for Sangor's son-in-law Ned L. Pines. The Sangor Shop produced the characters and stories of The Black Terror, Pyroman, and Fighting Yank for Pines' Nedor Comics and produced most of the comics for Pines until 1945.

=== Independent publishing ===
In 1943, ACG started to publish its own work under such names as B&I Publishing, Michel Publications and Regis Publishing. It acquired the publisher Creston Publications in 1943, making Creston into an ACG imprint. By 1948, it was publishing comics under the name of American Comics Group. Its titles were typical of the times, including horror, crime, mystery, romance, and talking animal comics. In 1948, it began publishing the long-running horror title Adventures into the Unknown. This was the first of a trilogy of ACG horror/supernatural titles that also included Forbidden Worlds (1951–1967) and Unknown Worlds (1960–1967).

In 1949, ACG began publishing two long-running romance titles, Romantic Adventures (later changed to My Romantic Adventures), and Lovelorn (later changed to Confessions of the Lovelorn). Both titles lasted into the 1960s.

The company survived the 1954 Senate subcommittee hearings on the dangers of comic books, even retaining its somewhat diluted horror title Adventures into the Unknown. However, in 1955 ACG canceled four long-running humor titles: the talking-animal series Giggle Comics and Ha Ha Comics, and the teen-humor titles Cookie and The Kilroys.

An October 1, 1952 "Statement of the Ownership, Management, and Circulation" published in ACG's Forbidden Worlds #15 gave its publisher's name as “Preferred Publications, Inc., 8 Lord St., Buffalo, New York” and the owners as Preferred Publications and "B. W. Sangor, 7 West 81st Street, New York, N. Y." The editor was listed as “Richard E. Hughes, 120 West 183rd St., New York, N. Y.” and the business manager as "Frederick H. Iger, 50 Beverly Road, Great Neck, Great Neck, L. I., N. Y." An October 1, 1950, statement published in ACG's Cookie #29 gives identical data, with the exception of the publisher and co-owner being listed as "Michel Publications, Inc. 420 DeSoto Ave., St. Louis 7, Mo.”

Almost all stories after 1957 were written by editor Hughes under a variety of pseudonyms. Besides the satirical superhero the Fat Fury, other ACG superheroes of the period known as the Silver Age of Comic Books included Magicman (starting in Forbidden Worlds #125), Nemesis in Adventures into the Unknown (starting with #154), and John Force, Magic Agent, in his own title in 1962, then later in Unknown Worlds (#35, 36, 48, 50, 52, 56), with a few stories in Forbidden Worlds (#124, 145) and Adventures into the Unknown (#153, 157). ACG's superheroes failed to catch on. Sales of Forbidden Worlds and Adventures into the Unknown slumped after superheroes were put into their pages, and Hughes responded by dropping the entire ACG superhero line and returning both series to their original fantasy formula in the winter of 1967.

In the late 1960s, the company was owned by Vanderbilt Tire and Rubber Company, who later bought out rival publisher Tower Comics in 1968. By 1968, the company had ended publication, except for its commercial comics division, Custom Comics, established in 1950, which lasted until the early 1980s doing work for a variety of clients such as the A. C. Gilbert toy company, Montgomery Ward, Tupperware, and the United States Air Force.

== Titles ==
- Adventures into the Unknown #1–174 (Fall 1948–August 1967)
- Blazing West #1–20 (Fall 1948–November 1951); continues as The Hooded Horseman v1
- Commander Battle and the Atomic Sub #1–7 (July 1954–August 1955)
- Confessions of the Lovelorn #52–114 (63 issues, August 1954–June 1960); continues from Lovelorn (the indicia title through #75)
- Cookie #1–55 (April 1946–September 1955)
- Dizzy Dames #1–6 (September 1952–July 1953)
- Forbidden Worlds #1–145 (July/August 1951–August 1967); paused after #34 to briefly continue as Young Heroes before resuming
- Funny Films #1–29 (September 1949–May 1954)
- Gasp! #1–4 (March 1967–August 1967)
- Giggle Comics #1–99 (October 1943 – January 1955); acquired from Creston Publications; continues as Spencer Spook
- Ha Ha Comics #1–99 (October 1943 – December 1954/January 1955); continues as TeePee Tim
- Hi-Jinks #1–7 (July 1947 – July 1948)
- Herbie #1–23 (April/May 1964 – February 1967)
- The Hooded Horseman v1 #21–27 (7 issues, January 1952–January 1953); continues from Blazing West
- The Hooded Horseman v2 #18–22 (5 issues, November 1954–August 1958); continues from Out of the Night
- The Kilroys #1–54 (June/July 1947–June/July 1955)
- Lovelorn #1–51 (August/September 1949–July 1954); continues as Confessions of the Lovelorn
- Magic Agent #1–3 (January/February 1962–May/June 1962)
- Midnight Mystery (7 issues, January 1961–October 1961)
- Milt Gross Funnies #1–2 (August 1947–September 1947)
- Moon Mullins #1–5 (December 1947–August 1948); continued at St. John Publications
- My Romantic Adventures #49–138 (90 issues, September 1954–March 1964); continues from Romantic Adventures (the indicia title through #71)
- Operation Peril #1–16 (October 1950–May 1953)
- Out of the Night (17 issues, February 1952–November 1954); continues as The Hooded Horseman v2
- Romantic Adventures #1–48 (March/April 1949–August 1954); continues as My Romantic Adventures
- Search For Love #1–2 (February–April 1950)
- Skeleton Hand in Secrets of the Supernatural (6 Issues, September/October 1952–July/August 1953)
- Soldiers of Fortune #1–12 (March/April 1951–January/February 1953) — acquired from Creston Publications
- Spencer Spook #100–101 (2 issues, March-May 1955); continues from Giggle Comics; see Ace Comics
- Spy and Counterspy #1–2 (August-October 1949); continues as Spy Hunters
- Spy Hunters #3–24 (22 issues, December 1949–June 1953); continues from Spy and Counterspy
- Teepee Tim #101–103 (3 issues, February-June 1955); continues from Ha Ha Comics
- Unknown Worlds #1–57 (August 1960–August 1967)
- Wrangler Great Moments in Rodeo (50 issues, 1955–1966)
- Young Heroes #35–37 (3 issues, February–June 1955); continues from Forbidden Worlds #34
- One shots: Chuckle (1945), Hi-Jinx (1945), Merry-Go-Round (1944), The Sheriff of Coshise (1957), and The Clutching Hand (1954)

== Imprints ==
- B & I Publishing Co., Inc.
- B. & M. Distributing Co., Inc.
- Best Syndicated Features, Inc.
- Creston Publications Corp.
- Culver Publications
- Custom Comics, Inc.
- La Salle Publishing Co.
- Michel Publications, Inc.
- Milt Gross, Inc.
- Modern Store Publications
- Modern Store Publishing
- Preferred Publications, Inc.
- Regis Publications, Inc.
- Scope Magazines, Inc.
- Titan Publishing Co. Inc.
