= Detective Comics 27 =

Comic book depicting the debut of fictional superhero Batman

Detective Comics #27
- Cover of Detective Comics #27 (May 1939) by Bob Kane

Publication information
- Publisher: DC Comics
- Genre: Superhero; Crime fiction
- Publication date: March 30, 1939 (on sale); May 1939 (cover date)

Detective Comics #27 is an American comic book of the Detective Comics anthology series, which debuted the superhero Batman in a featured story called "The Case of the Chemical Syndicate" during the Golden Age of Comic Books. It is considered one of the most important and valuable first appearance debuts from DC Comics alongside Action Comics #1, released the previous year. In addition to the debut of Batman, Detective Comics #27 included several other stories featuring established and original characters. These features represented the range of genres covered by the anthology series at the time, including crime, espionage, western, and mystery fiction.

== Features ==
=== The Bat-Man: "The Case of the Chemical Syndicate and Ritik the Great" ===
==== Plot ====
A man named Lambert has been stabbed to death. Lambert had three other business partners: Steven Crane, Alfred Stryker and Paul Rogers. His son's fingerprints have been found on the knife. Commissioner Gordon investigates, bringing with him his friend socialite Bruce Wayne. Lambert's son asserts his fingerprints got on the blade while he pulled it from his father's neck. Crane calls to say that Lambert had received an anonymous death threat the previous day. Crane himself received one today. Wayne departs, saying that he is going home. By the time the police go to Crane's house, they find him dead by gunshot.

Crane's murderer meets his accomplice and shows him the contract he stole. A masked figure called "the Bat-Man" appears, wins out in combat, and has a look at the contract.

Rogers goes to Stryker's house after hearing about the murders on the radio. Stryker's assistant, Jennings, forces Rogers into a bell-shaped gas chamber to kill him. The Bat-Man arrives, defeats Jennings and saves Rogers. Stryker reveals himself to have killed Lambert and Crane's murderer. He attacks Rogers, but the Bat-Man subdues him. The Bat-Man reveals that Stryker killed the others in order to take over the Apex Chemical Corporation. He hired murderers to kill his business partners and steal the secret contracts he had signed with the victims. He attempts to kill the Bat-Man, but is knocked into an acid tank where he is killed. The Bat-Man says "A fitting end for his kind", before disappearing through an open skylight.

The next day, Commissioner Gordon talks to Wayne and tells him about the Bat-Man's caper. Wayne feigns incredulity, but it is revealed to the reader that he is in fact the Bat-Man.

==== Reprints ====
- Detective Comics #387
- Detective Comics #627
- Famous First Edition C-28
- Millennium Edition:Detective Comics #27
- Batman Archives Vol. 1
- Batman Chronicles Vol. 1
- Batman: From The 30's to the 70's

==== Remakes ====
Having significance as Batman's first published adventure, "The Case of the Chemical Syndicate" has been remade several times. In 1969, the thirtieth anniversary of the story, an update written by Mike Friedrich was published in Detective Comics #387 with art by Bob Brown and Joe Giella. The story, entitled "The Cry of Night is -- Sudden Death!", modernized the story and introduced an element of generational gap, playing on a small aspect of the original in which the victim's son was suspected of the crime.

Another remake appeared in Secret Origins #6 (1986) by Roy Thomas and Marshall Rogers, more closely mirroring the original's plot, with updated art.

Detective Comics #627 was a special issue including four different versions of the story. It contained the 1939 original, the 1969 update (retitled "The Cry of Night is -- Kill!"), and two new takes on the story, one by Marv Wolfman and Jim Aparo, and another by Alan Grant and Norm Breyfogle.

Brad Meltzer wrote an updated version of this story with art by Bryan Hitch for The New 52's Detective Comics volume 2 #27 which was released in January 2014 as part of Batman's 75th anniversary. The plot and characters are largely the same, but with a twist ending implying Stryker becomes the Joker after falling into the vat of acid.

=== Speed Saunders: "Killers of Kurdistan" ===
Speed Saunders is called in to investigate a corpse recovered from the river. On the body he finds a letter bearing the symbol of a red crescent moon. He visits Trelawney, an expert in Eastern lore, who is hosting a party. Trelawney reveals he had once infiltrated the secretive cult known as the Killers of Kurdistan during a trip to Arabia with a friend named Tom, now deceased. During the party, Trelawney is shot in the back and dies. Speed seals off the building, and with the help of local police, tracks down a suspect named Hassan, who dies after confessing to the murder. He reveals he was coerced by a mysterious woman known as the Veiled Prophetress. She is later apprehended.

=== Buck Marshall: "Bullet Bluff" ===
Buck Marshall, a range detective, is drawn into a murder investigation after a rider named Matt Doyle reports the killing of his boss, Jerry Kane. At the Box-K ranch, Marshall determines the body has been moved. He confronts Jack Stark, foreman of a nearby outfit, after discovering a suspicious black cartridge. Stark attempts to arm himself, but is arrested. He confesses that Kane was executed for betraying a cattle rustling ring.

=== Bart Regan, Spy: "The Mysterious Murders" ===
Bart Regan, an agent of the U.S. Spy Service, is tasked with protecting a congressional committee after its members begin dying of unexplained internal hemorrhages. Regan witnesses one death, narrowly avoids another, and determines the cause to be poison released by dissolving cellulose capsules hidden in food. After a confrontation with the agents responsible, Regan dismantles the spy ring and prevents further assassinations.

=== The Crimson Avenger: "Murder on the Oceanic Line Docks" ===
The Crimson Avenger investigates the murder of a nightclub owner named Abe Gold at the Oceanic Line Docks. A man named Beard is hospitalized following a car crash but is kidnapped by imposters posing as ambulance personnel. Lee Travis suspects Beard had evidence of Gold's murder and finds a camera with missing film. As the Crimson Avenger, he raids multiple criminal hideouts and confronts Mike Moran, the ringleader. Moran attempts bribery with a check made out to the Avenger, which is later donated anonymously to charity.

=== Bruce Nelson: "The New Orleans Mardi Gras Murders, Part 1" ===
Bruce Nelson visits his friend Ed Lane in New Orleans during Mardi Gras. They investigate the voodoo-related murder of a woman named Lili Garvet, discovering her body amid ritual paraphernalia. Lane is nearly killed by poison gas released from an ashtray. Nelson detects the trap and saves him, continuing the investigation into possible supernatural or ritualistic motives.

=== "The Insidious Dr. Fu Manchu" Part 11 of 12 ===
An adaptation of Sax Rohmer's pulp novels. Denis Nayland Smith warns Reverend Eltham of threats against him and his daughter Greba. Greba reports seeing eerie green eyes outside her window. Smith suspects the involvement of Fu Manchu, a recurring villain in pulp literature. The installment focuses on growing tension and investigative buildup.

=== "Cosmo, the Phantom of Disguise: Illegal Aliens" ===
Cosmo, the Phantom of Disguise goes undercover to investigate a Chinese immigrant smuggling operation. Disguised as a language student, he infiltrates a secret transport network using coal barges to bring people ashore. Discovered, Cosmo defeats multiple attackers and alerts the Coast Guard. The story concludes with Cosmo revealing his identity to local authorities who had mistaken him for a criminal.

=== Slam Bradley: "The Murderer on Vacation" ===
Slam Bradley, created by Jerry Siegel and Joe Shuster, takes a break from manhunting with his partner Shorty Morgan. They meet federal agent Dick Kelly, who was recently kidnapped by Blackjack Benson. Later, Blackjack escapes death row with help from his brother Helger. Bradley and Shorty travel to Switzerland, survive an assassination attempt, and track the gang to a cave hideout. A final battle ensues, ending in Blackjack’s recapture and execution.

=== "Death on the Airwaves" (text story) ===
Written by Gardner Fox, this prose piece follows Captain Richard Byrne as he investigates multiple deaths at the Federal Broadcasting System. Performers collapse during live radio broadcasts. Byrne discovers the killer is a rejected applicant who used gas-emitting microphones to murder those he envied. Byrne apprehends the culprit during an attempted fourth killing.

== Legacy ==
Though not being the first of the Detective Comics series, the issue is considered a landmark as the first appearance of Batman. Originally starting out as an anthology series focusing on original crime series stories, the iconic superhero known as Batman would be introduced by Bob Kane and Bill Finger to National Comics Publications (now DC Comics) with inspiration to create a new Superman that first appeared in Action Comics #1. Due to the character being a household name, the original comic has endured as one of the most valuable comic books of all time alongside the likes of Action Comics #1 and Spider-Man's first appearance in Amazing Fantasy #15. The comic book is cited to be very rare to find in mint condition in comic book collecting.

== See also ==
- Batman comic book
- The Man Behind the Red Hood!
