= Detective Comics =

Title used for two American comic book series

- Detective Comics #27 (May 1939), art by Bob Kane

Publication information
- Publisher: Detective Comics, Inc.: #1–119; National Comics Publications: #120–296; National Periodical Publications: #297–467; DC Comics: #468–current
- Schedule: List: Monthly: #1–434, #446–466, #489–811 Eight times a year: #469–474 Bimonthly: #435–445, #467–468, #475–488 Twice-monthly #934–current Weekly #1047–1058
- Format: Ongoing series
- Publication date: List: (vol. 1) March 1937 – October 2011 (vol. 2) November 2011 – July 2016 (vol. 1 cont.) August 2016–present
- No. of issues: List: (vol. 1): 883 (#1–881, plus issues numbered #0 and #1,000,000) and 12 Annuals (vol. 2): 57 (#1–52, plus issues numbered #0 and #23.1 through 23.4) and 3 Annuals (vol. 1 cont.): 142 (#934–1075) and 5 Annuals (as of December 2023 cover date)
- Main character: List: Batman (since #27) Other characters: Slam Bradley Elongated Man Batgirl Robin the Manhunter Man-Bat Green Arrow Human Target Batwoman

Creative team
- Written by: List: (vol. 1) Bill Finger Dennis O'Neil Frank Robbins Gerry Conway Archie Goodwin Steve Englehart David V. Reed Alan Grant Chuck Dixon Ed Brubaker Greg Rucka Scott Snyder Paul Dini (vol. 2) Tony Daniel Derek Fridolfs Gregg Hurwitz Matt Kindt John Layman Frank Tieri Peter J. Tomasi Francis Manapul Brian Buccellato Benjamin Percy Ray Fawkes (vol. 1 cont.) James Tynion IV Michael Moreci Bryan Hill James Robinson Peter J. Tomasi Mariko Tamaki Ram V
- Penciller: List: (vol. 1) Bob Kane Dick Sprang Sheldon Moldoff Carmine Infantino Gil Kane Neal Adams Irv Novick Jim Aparo Walt Simonson Ernie Chan Marshall Rogers Gene Colan Alan Davis Tom Mandrake Don Newton J. H. Williams III, Pete Woods (vol. 2) Ed Benes, Andy Clarke, Tony Daniel Scot Eaton Jason Fabok Mikel Janin Syzmon Kudranski Eduardo Pansica Javier Pina
- Inker: List: (vol. 1) Jerry Robinson Charles Paris Murphy Anderson Joe Giella Sid Greene Dick Giordano Terry Austin Alfredo Alcala
- Colorist: List: Adrienne Roy

Detective Comics (later retitled as Batman Detective Comics) is an American comic book series published by Detective Comics, later shortened to DC Comics. The first volume, published from 1937 to 2011 (and later continued in 2016), is best known for introducing the superhero Batman in Detective Comics #27 (cover-dated May 1939).

A second series of the same title was launched in September 2011, but in 2016, reverted to the original volume numbering. The series is the source of its publishing company's name, and—along with Action Comics, the series that launched with the debut of Superman—one of the medium's signature series. Between 1937 and 2011, there were 881 issues of the series. It is the longest-running comic book series in the United States. (Note: Action Comics amassed more individual issues, 904 in total, despite launching a year after Detective due to 42 issues (#601–642) in 1988–89 that were published weekly, and because of Detective Comics' bimonthly run from 1973 to 1975. The American record-holder for most issues published is Dell Comics' Four Color series, which amassed more than 1,300 issues over a 23-year run.)

== Publication history ==
Detective Comics #1 (March 1937). Art by Vin Sullivan.

Detective Comics was the final publication of the entrepreneur Major Malcolm Wheeler-Nicholson, whose comics company, National Allied Publications, evolved into DC Comics, one of the world's two largest comic book publishers, though long after its founder had left it. Wheeler-Nicholson's first two titles were the landmark New Fun: The Big Comic-Magazine #1 (cover-dated Feb. 1935), colloquially called New Fun Comics #1 and the first such early comic book to contain all-original content, rather than a mix of newspaper comic strips and comic-strip-style new material. His second effort, New Comics #1, was retitled twice to become Adventure Comics, another seminal series that ran for decades until issue #503, in 1983, and was later revived in 2009.

The third and final title published under his aegis was Detective Comics, advertised with a cover illustration dated December 1936, but eventually premiering three months later, with a March 1937 cover date. Wheeler-Nicholson was in debt to printing-plant owner and magazine distributor Harry Donenfeld, who was, as well, a pulp-magazine publisher and a principal in the magazine distributorship Independent News. Wheeler-Nicholson took Donenfeld on as a partner to publish Detective Comics #1 with Wheeler-Nicholson and Jack Liebowitz, Donenfeld's accountant, listed as owners. Wheeler-Nicholson was forced out a year later.

Originally an anthology comic, Detective Comics #1 (March 1937) featured stories in the "hard-boiled detective" genre, with such stars as Ching Lung (a Fu Manchu-style "Yellow Peril" villain); Slam Bradley (created by Jerry Siegel and Joe Shuster before their character Superman saw print two years later); and Speed Saunders, among others. Its first editor, Vin Sullivan, also drew the debut issue's cover. The Crimson Avenger debuted in issue #20 (October 1938).

Early issues of the series have been criticized for their racism and xenophobia.

=== Batman / Bruce Wayne ===
Cover of Detective Comics #140 (October 1948), the first appearance of the Riddler. Art by Win Mortimer.

Detective Comics #27 (released March 1939, with a cover date of May 1939) marked the first appearance of Batman. He eventually became the star of the title, the cover logo of which is often written as "Detective Comics featuring Batman". Because of its significance, issue #27 is among the most valuable comic books in existence, with one copy selling for $1,075,000 in a February 2010 auction.

Batman's origin is first revealed in a two-page story in issue #33 (Nov. 1939). Batman became the main cover feature of the title beginning with issue #35 (Jan. 1940). Issue #38 (April 1940) introduced Batman's sidekick Robin, billed as "The Sensational Character Find of 1940" on the cover and the first of several characters that would make up the "Batman Family." Robin's appearance and the subsequent increase in sales of the book soon led to the trend of superheroes and young sidekicks that characterize the era that fans and historians call the "Golden Age of Comic Books." Several of Batman's best known villains debuted in the pages of Detective Comics during this era, including the Penguin in issue #58, Two-Face in issue #66, and the Riddler in issue #140.

Batwoman first appeared in Detective Comics #233 (July 1956). Since the family formula had proven very successful for the Superman franchise, editor Jack Schiff suggested to Batman co-creator Bob Kane that he create one for the Batman. A female was chosen first, to offset the charges made by Fredric Wertham that Batman and Robin were homosexual. Writer Bill Finger and artist Sheldon Moldoff introduced Bat-Mite in issue #267 (May 1959) and Clayface in #298 (Dec. 1961).

In 1964, Julius Schwartz was made responsible for reviving the fading Batman titles. Writer John Broome and artist Carmine Infantino jettisoned the sillier aspects that had crept into the franchise, such as Ace the Bathound and Bat-Mite and gave the character a "New Look" that premiered in Detective Comics #327 (May 1964). Schwartz, Gardner Fox, and Infantino introduced, from the William Dozier produced TV series, Barbara Gordon as a new version of Batgirl in a story titled "The Million Dollar Debut of Batgirl!" in issue #359 (Jan. 1967). Mike Friedrich wrote the 30th anniversary Batman story in Detective Comics #387 (May 1969) which was drawn by Bob Brown.

Writer Dennis O'Neil and artist Neal Adams had their first collaboration on Batman on the story "The Secret of the Waiting Graves" in issue #395 (Jan. 1970). The duo, under the direction of Schwartz, revitalized the character with a series of noteworthy stories reestablishing Batman's dark, brooding nature and taking the books away from the campy look and feel of the 1966–68 ABC TV series. Comics historian Les Daniels observed that "O'Neil's interpretation of Batman as a vengeful obsessive-compulsive, which he modestly describes as a return to the roots, was actually an act of creative imagination that has influenced every subsequent version of the Dark Knight." Adams introduced the Man-Bat with writer Frank Robbins in Detective Comics #400 (June 1970). O'Neil and artist Bob Brown crafted Batman's first encounter with the League of Assassins in Detective Comics #405 (Nov. 1970) and created Talia al Ghul in issue #411 (May 1971).

After publishing on a monthly schedule throughout its run, Detective Comics became a bi-monthly book from issues #435 (June–July 1973) to #445 (Feb.-March 1975). Issues #438 (Dec. 1973-Jan. 1974) to #445 (Feb.–March 1975) of the series were in the 100 Page Super Spectacular format. O'Neil and artist Dick Giordano created the Batman supporting character Leslie Thompkins in the story "There Is No Hope in Crime Alley" appearing in issue #457 (March 1976). Writer Steve Englehart and artist Marshall Rogers produced an acclaimed run of Batman stories in Detective Comics #471–476 (Aug. 1977 – April 1978), and provided one of the definitive interpretations that influenced the 1989 Batman film and was adapted for the 1990s animated series. The Englehart and Rogers pairing, was described in 2009 by comics writer and historian Robert Greenberger as "one of the greatest" creative teams to work on the Batman character. In their story "The Laughing Fish", the Joker is brazen enough to disfigure fish with a rictus grin, then expects to be granted a federal trademark on them, only to start killing the bureaucrats who try to explain to him that obtaining such a claim on a natural resource is legally impossible. Writer Len Wein and Rogers co-created the third version of the supervillain Clayface in Detective Comics #478 (July–Aug. 1978). From issue #481 (Dec. 1978 – Jan. 1979) through #495 (Oct. 1980), the magazine adopted the expanded Dollar Comics format used by the canceled Batman Family, adding solo features including "Robin: the Teen Wonder", "Batgirl", the "Human Target" and the anthology "Tales of Gotham City", which featured stories of the city's ordinary people. Julius Schwartz, who had edited the title for most of its run since 1964, left the series as of issue #484 (June–July 1979) The original Katherine Kane also known as "Batwoman" was killed in the lead story in issue #485 (Aug.–Sept. 1979) by the League of Assassins.

The title's 500th issue (March 1981) featured stories by several well-known creators including television writer Alan Brennert and Walter B. Gibson best known for his work on the pulp fiction character The Shadow. Also used during the 1980s was the use of serialization of the main Batman story, with stories from Detective Comics and Batman directly flowing from one book to another, with cliffhangers at the end of each book's monthly story that would be resolved in the other title of that month. A single writer handled both books during that time beginning with Gerry Conway and followed up by Doug Moench. The supervillain Killer Croc made a shadowy cameo in issue #523 (Feb. 1983). Noted author Harlan Ellison wrote the Batman story in issue #567.

Writer Mike W. Barr and artists Alan Davis and Todd McFarlane crafted the "Batman: Year Two" storyline in Detective Comics #575–578 which followed up on Frank Miller's "Batman: Year One". Writer Alan Grant and artist Norm Breyfogle introduced the Ventriloquist in their first Batman story together and the Ratcatcher in their third (#585). Sam Hamm, who wrote the screenplay for Tim Burton's Batman, wrote the "Blind Justice" story in Detective Comics issues #598–600. Chuck Dixon became the writer of the series with issue #644 (May 1992). He and Tom Lyle co-created the Electrocutioner in Detective Comics #644 (May 1992) and Stephanie Brown in Detective Comics #647 (August 1992).

The "Batman: Legacy" storyline began in issue #700 (August 1996). The "No Man's Land" storyline crossed over into Detective Comics in issues #730–741. Writer Greg Rucka and artist Shawn Martinbrough became the creative team as of issue #742 (March 2000) and created the Sasha Bordeaux character in issue #751 (Dec. 2000). Issue #800 (Jan. 2005) was written by Andersen Gabrych and drawn by Pete Woods. Paul Dini became the writer of the series as of issue #821 (Sept. 2006) and created a new version of the Ventriloquist in #827 (March 2007). Scott Snyder became the writer of Detective Comics with issue #871 (Jan. 2011).

=== Back-up features ===
In addition to the Batman stories, the title has had numerous back-up strips. The Boy Commandos by Joe Simon and Jack Kirby debuted in Detective Comics #64 (June 1942) and were then soon spun off into their own title. The character Roy Raymond first appeared in issue #153 (Nov. 1949). The Martian Manhunter was created by writer Joseph Samachson and artist Joe Certa in the back-up story "The Strange Experiment of Dr. Erdel" in Detective Comics #225 (Nov. 1955). After issue #326 (April 1964), the Martian Manhunter was moved to House of Mystery and in issue #327 the Elongated Man and his wife, now remodeled after Dashiell Hammett's Nick and Nora Charles, took over. The characters crossed over with Batman three times. The Elongated Man run lasted until issue #383 (Jan. 1969) and his feature returned sporadically 15 times until issue #572, which celebrated the 50th anniversary of the title by teaming him up with Batman, Robin, Slam Bradley and Sherlock Holmes against Edgar Moriarty, the great-grandnephew of Professor Moriarty. After the Elongated Man back-up feature ended, Batgirl held the role until issue #424. She returned from issues 481–519 after being moved to Batman Family. Jason Bard appeared as the backup feature in the odd-numbered issues of Detective from #425–435. The Manhunter was resurrected in a story by Archie Goodwin and Walt Simonson in issue #437 (Oct.-Nov. 1973). With the last episode of the series, Manhunter moved to the front of the book in a full-length team-up with Batman. The Green Arrow became the back-up feature starting with issue #521 (Dec. 1982) and running until #567 (Oct. 1986). The Black Canary received a new costume in the back-up story in issue #554 (Sept. 1985). DC Comics Bonus Books were included in issues #589 (August 1988) and 595 (Jan. 1989).

After a lengthy absence, the backup features returned for issues #746–810. These were more closed-ended stories featuring new and established characters in the Batman mythos. The first was "The Jacobian" in issues #746–757, followed by a one-issue Batman story in #758. The following issues, #759–762, featured Slam Bradley and were a lead-in to the 2002 Catwoman series. Issues #763–772 featured Josephine "Josie Mac" MacDonald, a Gotham police detective. Issues #773–775 were titled "Tales of Gotham" and feature Detectives Crispus Allen and Renee Montoya. Batman starred in "Spore" from issues #776–780. #781 featured a special Elseworlds tale, while #782 featured a Batman solo tale. Issue #783 featured a prelude to the "Death and the Maidens" miniseries, and issue #784 featured a Josie Mac tale. The "Tales of Gotham" stories resumed in issues #785–788 with "The Dogcatcher", and #789–794 featured "The Tailor". "Polished Stone", featuring the Green Arrow and Onyx, ran in issues #795–796. "Low", featuring the Riddler and Poison Ivy, ran from issues #797–799. Under the title "Tales of Gotham," Detective Comics #800 had a short Batman back-up story. A four-issue (#801–805) story featuring the Barker entitled "When You're Strange" was next and "Mud" in issue #805. The last back-up was a three-issue (#808–810) story about Killer Croc. It came after a two-issue (#806–807) story about Alfred.

The "Manhunter" series that ran as a backup in Detective Comics from 1973 to 1974 won the Shazam Award for "Best Individual Short Story (Dramatic)" in 1974 for the story "Cathedral Perilous" in issue #441, written by Archie Goodwin and Walt Simonson.

=== Batwoman ===
In 2009, as part of a planned reorganization of the Batman universe due to the events shown in Batman R.I.P. and Final Crisis, Detective Comics went on hiatus for three months while DC Comics published the Battle for the Cowl miniseries. Upon its return, the series featured the newly reintroduced (in 52) Batwoman as the new star of the book, as well as a 10-page back-up feature starring Renee Montoya as the new Question. The series returned Batman to a starring role in early 2010.

=== The New 52 ===
DC Comics relaunched Detective Comics with issue #1 in September 2011, as part of an initiative called The New 52. The series was written and drawn by Tony Daniel until the 12th issue, with the team of John Layman and Jason Fabok beginning with issue #13.

The first issue of the relaunched Detective Comics has received six printings, second only to the relaunched Justice League which had seven printings. The series' 7th issue was also DC Comic's 6th highest selling digital comic, ranking above many other series in the Batman category. Scott West of Sciencefiction.com gave the series' third arc a positive review, stating that "After last month's disappointing 'Night of the Owls' tie-in issue, it's nice to see 'Detective Comics' getting back to where it should be...good detective stories." The relaunched Detective Comics received the award for "Best Series" at the 2012 Stan Lee Awards. The series' first collected edition reached the number 1 spot on The New York Times Best Seller list in the category of "Hardcover Graphic Books".

Daniel wrote and penciled the series until the Night of the Owls crossover, at which point Ed Benes, Julio Ferreira, and Eduardo Pansica began drawing the series for a three-issue arc. The price of Detective Comics was increased due to the addition of a backup feature starring Batman villain Two-Face, which was written by Daniel and illustrated by Syzmon Kudranski, this followed a similar backup featuring Professor Hugo Strange. Daniel left the series with issue #12 being his last as writer and the "0" issue his last as penciller.

DC celebrated the first anniversary of The New 52 in September 2012 by publishing a number "0" of each original New 52 title which act as prequels to the series and reveal previously unexplained plot elements. Gregg Hurwitz wrote the "0" issue. Hurwitz was approached by Daniel to write the "0" issue due to Daniel's busy schedule. To follow up on the Night of the Owls elements in Detective Comics, Daniel wrote Detective Comics Annual #1, which was pencilled by Romano Molenaar and inked by Sandu Florea.

Following Daniel's tenure on the series, John Layman became the new writer and Jason Fabok the new artist with James Tynion IV writing the backup features and Syzmon Kudranski remaining as artist for Tynion's first feature. With issue #19 of Detective Comics vol. 2, released on April 3, 2013, the series reached 900 issues as combined with the first volume of the series, and was a special oversized celebratory issue. Under Layman, the series featured its first crossover, Gothtopia after which Layman and Fabok moved to the Batman Eternal series and Detective Comics was taken over by Brain Buccalleto and Francis Manapul.

In commemoration of the second anniversary of The New 52, DC Comics announced "Villains Month" with Detective Comics getting four issues. The issues starred Poison Ivy, Harley Quinn, the Scarecrow, and the Man-Bat, and, respectively, being numbered #23.1, #23.2, #23.3, and #23.4, by an ensemble of writers and artists.

For the 75th anniversary of Batman, issue #27 was a larger-sized issue featuring new stories by Brad Meltzer and Bryan Hitch, Scott Snyder and Sean Murphy, Peter Tomasi and Ian Bertram, John Layman and Jason Fabok, Gregg Hurwitz and Neal Adams, Mike W. Barr and Guillem March, and one written and drawn by Francesco Francavilla. In addition, variant covers to the issue were by Greg Capullo, Frank Miller, Chris Burnham, Jim Lee, Jason Fabok, and Tony Daniel. Single page artwork included work by Kelley Jones, Mike Allred, Patrick Gleason, and Jock.

=== 2016–present ===
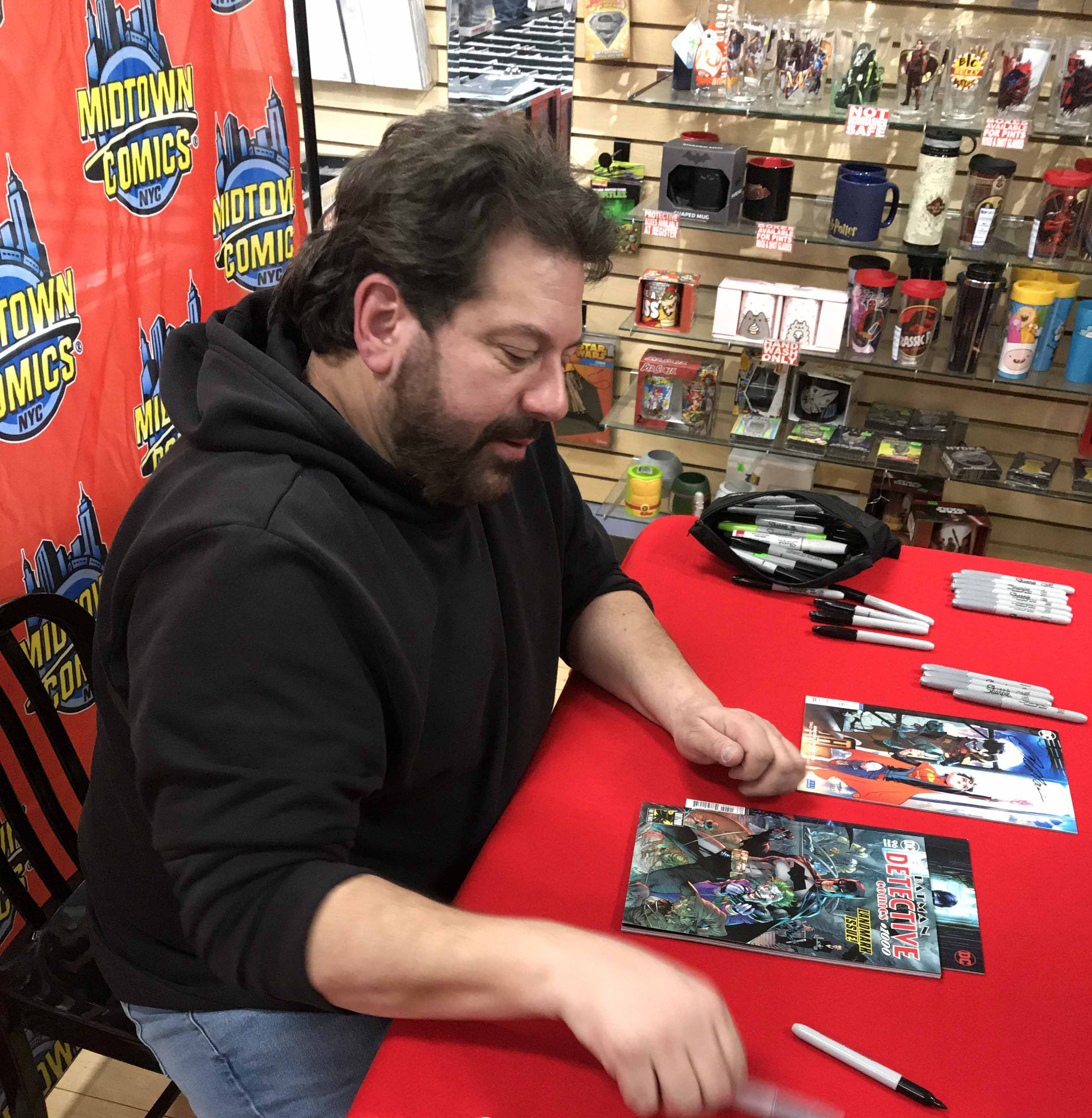
Writer Peter Tomasi at a 2019 signing for the series' 1,000th issue at Midtown Comics in Manhattan

In February 2016, DC Comics announced that as part of the company's continuity relaunch called DC Rebirth, Detective Comics would resume its original numbering system with June 2016's issue #934. The 52 issues of Detective Comics volume 2 (2011–2016) were added to the original count of 881 issues from Detective Comics volume 1 (1937–2011), making Detective Comics #934 the premier issue following the end of the DC Rebirth initiative. The series was published twice-monthly.

The creative team beginning with issue #934 included writer James Tynion IV and artists Eddy Barrows and Alvaro Martinez. The series featured a team led by Batman and Batwoman (Kate Kane), operating out of a secondary base in the heart of Gotham known as the Belfry. Team members initially included Red Robin (Tim Drake), Spoiler (Stephanie Brown), Orphan (Cassandra Cain) and Clayface (Basil Karlo), with Batwing (Luke Fox) and Azrael (Jean-Paul Valley) later recruited as new members. Zatanna also briefly joins the team as a guest star in several issues. This status quo ended with the conclusion of Tynion's run on the series in issue #981, published May 2018. During the interim period without a permanent writer, Bryan Edward Hill wrote the story arc "On the Outside" starring Batman, Orphan, Signal, Katana and Black Lightning over issues #983–987 as a prelude to his ongoing series Batman and the Outsiders. The next regular writer, Peter Tomasi, began on the series with issue #994, published December 2018. Tomasi's run as writer continued for two years until issue #1033, published December 2020.

On March 27, 2019, DC Comics released the series' 1,000th issue, marking the second American comic book in history to reach that milestone after Action Comics in 2018. The issue, which coincided with Batman's 80th anniversary, is an anthology featuring several stories from a variety of different creative teams.

Writer Mariko Tamaki began on the series with issue #1034 as part of the Infinite Frontier line-wide relaunch. In April 2022, it was announced that Ram V and Rafael Albuquerque would serve as the new creative team starting with issue #1062.

== Significant issues ==
=== First appearances ===
Character	Issue	Publication
Slam Bradley and Speed Saunders	#1	March 1937
Crimson Avenger	#20	October 1938
Batman, Commissioner Gordon	#27	May 1939
Doctor Death	#29	July 1939
Monk, Julie Madison	#31	Sept. 1939
Dala	#32	Oct. 1939
Joe Chill, Thomas Wayne, Martha Wayne	#33	Nov. 1939
Hugo Strange	#36	Feb. 1940
Robin (Dick Grayson)	#38	April 1940
Clayface (Basil Karlo)	#40	June 1940
Penguin	#58	December 1941
Air Wave	#60	February 1942
Mister Baffle	#63	May 1942
Boy Commandos	#64	June 1942
Two-Face	#66	Aug. 1942
Tweedledum and Tweedledee	#74	April 1943
Cavalier	#81	Nov. 1943
Riddler	#140	October 1948
Pow Wow Smith	#151	Sept. 1949
Roy Raymond	#153	Nov. 1949
Red Hood	#168	Feb. 1951
Firefly	#184	June 1952
Mysto	#203	January 1954
Mirror Man	#213	Nov. 1954
Batmen of All Nations	#215	Jan. 1955
Martian Manhunter	#225	Nov. 1955
Impostor Mad Hatter	#230	April 1956
Batwoman (Kathy Kane)	#233	July 1956
Diane Meade	#246	Aug. 1957
Terrible Trio	#253	March 1958
Calendar Man	#259	Sept. 1958
Doctor Double X	#261	Nov. 1958
Bat-Mite	#267	May 1959
Clayface (Matt Hagen)	#298	Dec. 1961
Catman, Zook	#311	Jan. 1963
Idol Head of Diabolu	#326	April 1964
Outsider	#334	Dec. 1964
Blockbuster	#345	Nov. 1965
Cluemaster	#351	May 1966
Batgirl (Barbara Gordon)	#359	Jan. 1967
Jason Bard	#392	Oct. 1969
Man-Bat	#400	June 1970
Talia al Ghul	#411	May 1971
Harvey Bullock	#441	July 1974
Leslie Thompkins	#457	March 1976
Calculator	#463	Sept. 1976
Doctor Phosphorus, Rupert Thorne	#469	May 1977
Silver St. Cloud	#470	June 1977
Clayface (Preston Payne)	#478	July 1978
Maxie Zeus	#483	May 1979
Odd Man	#487	December 1979
Swashbuckler	#493	March 1980
Killer Croc	#523 (Note: There was a shadowy cameo in Detective Comics #523 (Feb. 1983) and his first full appearance is credited to Batman #357 (March 1983))	Feb. 1983
Onyx	#546	Jan. 1985
Ventriloquist (Arnold Wesker)	#583	Feb. 1988
Ratcatcher	#585	April 1988
Anarky (Lonnie Machin)	#608	Nov. 1989
Renee Montoya	#642	March 1992
Stephanie Brown	#647	Jun. 1992
Cypher	#657	March 1993
Crispus Allen	#742	March 2000
Sasha Bordeaux	#751	Dec. 2000
Nyssa Raatko	#783	Aug. 2003
Ventriloquist (Peyton Riley)	#827	March 2007
Dollmaker	(vol. 2) #1	Sept. 2011
Dollhouse, Mister Toxic	(vol. 2) #2	Oct. 2011
Eli Strange	(vol. 2) #5	March 2012
Emperor Blackgate	(vol. 2) #13	Nov. 2012
The Merrymaker	(vol. 2) #17	Feb. 2013
Anarky (Sam Young)	(vol. 2) #37	Feb. 2015
Arkham Knight	#1000	May 2019
Silver Ghost	#1027	November 2020

== Collected editions ==
=== Volume 1 (1937–2011) ===
The Detective Comics series has been collected into a number of trade paperbacks and hardback collections.

==== Batman Archive editions ====
All DC Archive Editions are hardback only and printed on high quality archival paper.

Title	Material collected	Publication date	ISBN
Batman Archives Vol. 1	Stories from Detective Comics #27–50	November 1997	HC: 978-0930289607
Batman Archives Vol. 2	Stories from Detective Comics #51–70	November 1997	HC: 978-1563890000
Batman Archives Vol. 3	Stories from Detective Comics #71–86	November 1997	HC: 978-1563890994
Batman Archives Vol. 4	Stories from Detective Comics #87–102	December 1998	HC: 978-1563894145
Batman Archives Vol. 5	Stories from Detective Comics #103–119	April 2001	HC: 978-1563897252
Batman Archives Vol. 6	Stories from Detective Comics #120–135	August 2005	HC: 978-1401204099
Batman Archives Vol. 7	Stories from Detective Comics #136–154	November 2007	HC: 978-1401214937
Batman Archives Vol. 8	Stories from Detective Comics #155–170	July 2012	HC: 978-1401233761
Batman: The Dynamic Duo Archives Vol. 1	Batman #164–166; Detective Comics #327–333	March 2003	HC: 978-1563899324
Batman: The Dynamic Duo Archives Vol. 2	Batman #168–171; Detective Comics #334–339	June 2006	HC: 978-1401207724

==== Batman Chronicles ====
The Batman Chronicles series plans to reprint every Batman adventure in color, in chronological order, in affordable trade paperbacks. It is not to be confused with the now-finished series of the same name.

Title	Material collected	Publication date	ISBN
Batman Chronicles Vol. 1	Detective Comics #27–38; Batman #1	April 2005	SC: 978-1401204457
Batman Chronicles Vol. 2	Detective Comics #39–45; Batman #2–3; New York World's Fair Comics #2	September 2006	SC: 978-1401207908
Batman Chronicles Vol. 3	Detective Comics #46–50; Batman #4–5; World's Best Comics #1	May 2007	SC: 978-1401213473
Batman Chronicles Vol. 4	Detective Comics #51–56; World's Finest Comics #2–3; Batman #6–7	October 2007	SC: 978-1401214623
Batman Chronicles Vol. 5	Detective Comics #57–61; World's Finest Comics #4; Batman #8–9	April 2008	SC: 978-1401216825
Batman Chronicles Vol. 6	Detective Comics #62–66; World's Finest Comics #5–6; Batman #10–11	October 2008	SC: 978-1401219611
Batman Chronicles Vol. 7	Detective Comics #67–70; World's Finest Comics #7; Batman #12–13	March 2009	SC: 978-1401221348
Batman Chronicles Vol. 8	Detective Comics #71–74; World's Finest Comics #8–9; Batman #14–15	October 2009	SC: 978-1401224844
Batman Chronicles Vol. 9	Detective Comics #75–77; World's Finest Comics #10; Batman #16–17	March 2010	SC: 978-1401226459
Batman Chronicles Vol. 10	Detective Comics #78–81; World's Finest Comics #11; Batman #18–19	December 2010	SC: 978-1401228958
Batman Chronicles Vol. 11	Detective Comics #82–85; World's Finest Comics #12; Batman #20–21	January 2013	SC: 978-1401237394

==== Showcase Presents ====
All Showcase Presents collections are large (over 500 pages), softcover, black and white only reprints.

Title	Material collected	Publication date	ISBN
Showcase Presents: Batman Vol. 1	Detective Comics #327–342; Batman #164–174	August 2006	SC: 978-1401210861
Showcase Presents: Batman Vol. 2	Detective Comics #343–358; Batman #175, #177–181, #183–184, #188	June 2007	SC: 978-1401213626
Showcase Presents: Batman Vol. 3	Detective Comics #359–375; Batman #189–192, #194–197, #199–201	July 2008	SC: 978-1401217198
Showcase Presents: Batman Vol. 4	Detective Comics #376–390; Batman #202–215	July 2009	SC: 978-1401223144
Showcase Presents: Batman Vol. 5	Detective Comics #391–404; Batman #216–228	December 2011	SC: 978-1401232368
Showcase Presents: Batman Vol. 6	Detective Comics #408–426; Batman #229–244	January 2016	SC: 978-1401251536
Showcase Presents: Martian Manhunter Vol. 1	Detective Comics #225–304	July 2007	SC: 978-1401213688
Showcase Presents: Martian Manhunter Vol. 2	Detective Comics #305–326	May 2009	SC: 978-1401222567
Showcase Presents: Robin the Boy Wonder Vol. 1	Robin stories from Detective Comics #386, 390, 394–395, 398–403, 445, 447, 450–451	January 2008	SC: 978-1401216764
Showcase Presents: Batgirl Vol. 1	Batgirl stories from Detective Comics #359, 363, 369, 371, 384–385, 388–389, 392–393, 396–397, 400–401, 404–424	July 2007	SC: 978-1401213671
Showcase Presents: Enemy Ace Vol. 1	includes Enemy Ace story from Detective Comics #404	February 2008	SC: 978-1401217211

==== Celebration hardcovers ====
Starting in 2014, DC began releasing character retrospective anthologies, several of which feature issues of Detective Comics

Title	Material collected	Publication date	ISBN
Batman: A Celebration of 75 Years	Detective Comics #27, 83, 211, 216, 327, 359, 395, 442, 474, 574, 633, 711, 757, 821; Batman #1, 49, 181, 497 Batman (vol. 2) #2, World's Finest Comics #94, DC Special Series #21, Batman Special #1	July 2014	978-1401247584
Robin the Boy Wonder: A Celebration of 75 Years	Detective Comics #38, 342; Batman #20, 107, 156, 408, 428, 442, 657; Star-Spangled Comics #82, 86, 103; Batman Family #1; Nightwing #25, 101; Superman/Batman #7, 77; Robin (vol. 4) #46, 126; Batman & Robin Annual #1; Justice League of America #55; DC One Million 80-Page Giant #1,000,000	May 2015	978-1401255367
The Joker: A Celebration of 75 Years	Batman #1, 5, 25, 32, 85, 163, 251, 427, Batman (vol. 2) #15, Detective Comics #64, 168, 180, 475, 476, 726, 741, 826, Detective Comics (vol. 2) #1, World's Finest Comics #61, Superman (vol. 2) #9, Batman: Legends of the Dark Knight #66	July 2014	978-1401247591
Two-Face: A Celebration of 75 Years	Detective Comics #66, 68, 80, 739; Batman #50, 81, 234, 410–411, 572, Annual #14; The Brave and the Bold #106; The Joker #1; Secret Origins #1; Batman: Black and White #1; Gotham Central #10; Joker's Asylum: Two-Face #1; Batman and Robin #23	November 2017	978-1-4012-7438-2
Green Arrow: A Celebration of 75 Years	More Fun Comics #73, 89; Leading Comics #1; Adventure Comics #256; Justice League of America #4; The Brave and the Bold #85; Green Lantern/Green Arrow #85, 86, 90; Detective Comics #549–550; 559; Green Arrow (vol. 2) #24, 100–101; Green Arrow (vol. 3) #4, 18; Green Arrow Year One #2; Green Arrow and Black Canary Wedding Special #1; Justice League #8; Green Arrow (vol. 4) #24	July 2016	978-1401263867

==== Tales of The Batman/Legends of the Dark Knight ====
These hardcover books reprint issues by particular creators and contain many issues of Detective Comics, as well as other Batman titles.

Title	Material collected	Publication date	ISBN
Tales of the Batman: Carmine Infantino	Detective Comics #327–347, 349, 351–371, 500, Batman #166–175, 181, 183–184, 188–192, 194–199, The Brave and the Bold #172, 183, 190, 194, DC Comics Presents: Batman #1.	June 2014	9781401247553
Tales of the Batman: Len Wein	Detective Comics #408, 444–448, 466, 478–479, 500, 514, Batman #307–310, 312–319, 321–324, 326–327, World's Finest Comics #207, DC Retroactive Batman – The 70s, Untold Legends of the Batman #1–3, Batman Black and White #5	December 2014	978-1401251543
Tales of the Batman: Archie Goodwin	Batman stories from Detective Comics #437–438 and #440–442, the Manhunter stories from #437–442, and the Batman/Manhunter team-up from #443; Detective Comics Annual #3; Showcase '95 #11; Batman Black and White #1 and 4; Batman: Legends of the Dark Knight #132–136; the Batman: Night Cries graphic novel	July 2013	978-1401238292
Legends of the Dark Knight: Jim Aparo Volume 3	Detective Comics #444–446, Batman Family #17, The Brave and the Bold #152, 154, 155, 157–162, 168–170, 173–178, 180–182, The Untold Legend of the Batman #1–3	September 2017	978-1401271619
Legends of the Dark Knight: Michael Golden	Batman Family #15–20, Batman #295, 303, DC Special Series #15, Detective Comics #482, Batman Special #1, Batman: Gotham Knights #22; Covers from Detective Comics #625–626, 628–631, 633, 644–646, Batman #484–485, Showcase '93, Nightwing #66–77 & #129–130 and the Man-Bat entry from Who's Who in the DC Universe #12	June 2019	978-1401289614
Legends of the Dark Knight: Marshall Rogers	Detective Comics #468, 471–476, 478–479, 481; DC Special Series #15; Secret Origins #6; Batman: Legends of the Dark Knight #132–136; Batman: Dark Detective #1–6	November 2011	978-1401232276
Tales of the Batman: Don Newton	Detective Comics #480, 483–497; Batman #305–306, 328; The Brave and the Bold #153, 156 and 165	December 2011	978-1401232948
Tales of the Batman: Alan Brennert	The Brave and the Bold #178, 181, 182 and 197, Detective Comics #500, Batman: Holy Terror	July 2016	978-1401263492
Tales of the Batman: Gerry Conway Volume 1	Detective Comics #463, 464, 497–499, 501–504, The Brave And The Bold #158, 161, 171–174, Batman #295, 305, 306, Batman Family #17, Man-Bat #1, World's Finest Comics #250, #269	July 2017	978-1401272555
Tales of the Batman: Gerry Conway Volume 2	Detective Comics #505–513, Batman #337–346, 348; World's Finest Comics #270	August 2018	978-1401281632
Tales of the Batman: Gerry Conway Volume 3	Detective Comics #515–526, Batman #349–359	September 2019	978-1401292737
Tales of the Batman: Gene Colan Volume One	Detective Comics #517, 520, 523, 528–529 and Batman #340, 343–345, 348–351	August 2011	978-1401231019
Tales of the Batman: Gene Colan Volume Two	Batman #373, Detective Comics #530–538 and #540–544, World's Finest Comics #297 and #299	March 2018	978-1401277697
Legends of the Dark Knight: Alan Davis	Detective Comics #569–575, Batman: Full Circle, Batman: Gotham Knights #25	February 2013	978-1401236816
Legends of the Dark Knight: Norm Breyfogle Volume One	Detective Comics #579, 582–594, 601–607, stories from Batman Annual #11–12	July 2015	978-1401258986
Legends of the Dark Knight: Norm Breyfogle Volume Two	Detective Comics #608–621 and Batman #455–459	November 2018	978-1401285128
Tales of the Batman: J.H. Williams	Batman #526,550, 667–669, Batman Annual #21, Batman: Legends of the Dark Knight #86–88, 192–196, Chase #7–8, Detective Comics #821	July 2014	978-1401247621
Batman by Brian K. Vaughn	Batman #588-590, Detective Comics #787, Wonder Woman #160-161, and Batman: Gotham City Secret Files #1	December 2016	978-1401265373
Legends of the Dark Knight: Matt Wagner	Batman: Legends of the Dark Knight #28–30; Batman: Riddler—the Riddle Factory; Batman Black and White #3; Batman: the Monster Men #1–6; Batman: The Mad Monk #1–6; Batman #54, Robin II #1, Robin III #5, Detective Comics #647–649, Batman #626–641	June 2020	978-1779502599

==== Other editions ====
Many of these other editions are anthologies containing comics from titles other than Detective Comics. Titles here are presented as close to chronologically as possible.

Title	Material collected	Publication date	ISBN	Pages
Batgirl: The Bronze Age Omnibus Volume 1	Detective Comics #359, 363, 369, 371, 384–386, 388–389, 392–393, 396–397, 400–401, 404–424, 481–499, 501–502, 505–506, 508–510, 512–519, Batman #197 and Batman Family #1, 3–7 and 9–20.	December 2017	978-1401276409	504
Manhunter: The Special Edition	Manhunter backup stories from #437–442 and the Batman/Manhunter crossover in #443, Manhunter #1, and Batman: Legends of the Dark Knight #100	June 1999	978-1-56389-374-2	112
Batman: Strange Apparitions	Detective Comics #469–476, #478–479	December 1999	978-1-56389-500-5	192
DC Universe: The Stories of Alan Moore	Includes Night Olympics featuring the Green Arrow and the Black Canary from Detective Comics #549–550	January 2006	978-1-4012-0927-8	304
Batman: Year Two	Detective Comics #575–578 (later printing includes Batman: Full Circle)	January 1990; December 2002	978-0-930289-49-2; 978-1563899676	176
Batman: Year Two 30th Anniversary Deluxe Edition	Detective Comics #575–578; Batman: Full Circle	November 2017	978-1401274566	176
Batman: The Dark Knight Detective Volume 1	Detective Comics #568–574; 579–582	April 2018	978-1401271084	304
Batman: The Dark Knight Detective Volume 2	Detective Comics #583–591, Detective Comics Annual #1	October 2018	978-1401284688	280
Batman: The Dark Knight Detective Volume 3	Detective Comics #592–600	February 2020	978-1779501011	352
Batman: The Dark Knight Detective Volume 4	Detective Comics #601-611, Detective Comics Annual #2	January 2021	9781779507495	328
Batman: The Dark Knight Detective Volume 5	Detective Comics #612-614, #616-621, Detective Comics Annual #3	May 2021	9781779509659	280
Batman: The Dark Knight Detective Volume 6	Detective Comics #622-633	May 2022	9781779513304	320
Batman: The Dark Knight Detective Volume 7	Detective Comics #634-638, #641, #643, Batman #474, Batman: Legends of the Dark Knight #27, Detective Comics Annual #4	February 2023	9781779515070	288
Batman: The Dark Knight Detective Volume 8	Detective Comics #644-653, Detective Comics Annual #4-5	November 2023	9781779522924	360
Batman: Blind Justice	Detective Comics #598–600	May 2005	978-1-56389-047-5	160
Batman: Anarky	Detective Comics #608–609, Batman Chronicles #1, Batman: Shadow of the Bat #40–41, and Anarky #1–4	February 1999	978-1-56389-437-4	208
Batman: Knightfall Volume 1	Batman: Vengeance of Bane #1, Batman #491–500, Detective Comics #659–666, Showcase '93 #7–8 Batman: Shadow of the Bat #16–18	May 2012	978-1401233792	640
Batman: Knightfall Volume 2: Knightquest	Detective Comics #667–675, Shadow of the Bat #19–20, 24–28, Batman #501–508, Catwoman #6–7 Robin #7	May 2012	978-1401235369	656
Batman: Knightfall Volume 3: KnightsEnd	Batman #509–510, 512–514, Batman: Shadow of the Bat #29–30, 32–34, Detective Comics #676–677, 679–681, Batman: Legends of the Dark Knight #62–63, Robin #8–9, 11–13, Catwoman #12–13	September 2012	978-1401237219	652
Batman: Prelude to Knightfall	Batman: Vengeance of Bane #1, Batman #484–491, Detective Comics #654–658	September 2018	978-1401284220	376
Batman: Knightfall Vol. 1	Batman #492–497, Detective Comics #659–663	September 2018	978-1401284299	280
Batman: Knightfall Vol. 2	Batman #498–500, Detective Comics #664–666, Showcase '93 #7–8, Shadow of the Bat #16–18	September 2018	978-1401284398	312
Batman: Knightquest: The Crusade Vol. 1	Detective Comics #667–670, Robin #1–2, Batman: Shadow of the Bat #19–20, Batman #501–504, Catwoman #6–7	October 2018	978-1401284503	360
Batman: Knightquest: The Crusade Vol. 2	Detective Comics #671–675, Batman: Shadow of the Bat #24–28, Batman #505–508, Showcase '94 #7	October 2018	978-1401284589	384
Batman: KnightsEnd	Batman #509–510, Batman: Shadow of the Bat #29–30, Detective Comics #676–677, Batman: Legends of the Dark Knight #62–63, Robin #8–9, Catwoman #12–13, Showcase '94 #10	December 2018	978-1401285180	376
Batman: Zero Hour	Batman #0, #511; Batman: Shadow of the Bat #0, 31; Detective Comics #0, 678; Catwoman #0, 14; Batman: Legends of the Dark Knight #0; Robin #0, 10.	June 2017	978-1401272586	288
Batman: Prodigal	Batman #512–514, Batman: Shadow of the Bat #32–34, Detective Comics #679–681 and Robin #0 and #11–13	January 2019	978-1401285609	304
Batman: Troika	Batman #515, Batman: Shadow of The Bat #35, Detective Comics #682, Robin #14, Nightwing: Alfred Returns and Batman: Vengeance of Bane II	February 2019	978-1401285876	224
Robin Vol. 5: War of the Dragons	Robin #14–22, Robin Annual #3 and Detective Comics #685–686	January 2018	978-1401275129	280
Batman: Contagion	Collects Azrael #15–16, Batman #529, Batman Chronicles #4, Batman: Shadow of the Bat #48–49, Catwoman #31–35, Detective Comics #695–696, Robin #27–30	March 2016	978-1401260682	504
Batman: Legacy Volume 1	Batman #533, Batman: Shadow of the Bat #53, Catwoman #33–35, Detective Comics #697–700 and Robin #31.	April 2017	978-1401272029	264
Batman: Legacy Volume 2	Batman #534, Batman: Bane #1, Batman: Bane of the Demon #1–4, Batman: Shadow of the Bat #54, Detective Comics #701–702, Robin #32–33	February 2018	978-1401277611	296
Batman: Knight Out	September 2020	Detective Comics #703-718	1779506694	392
Batman: Cataclysm	Batman #553–554, Detective Comics #719–721, Batman: Shadow of the Bat #73–74, Nightwing #19–20, Catwoman #56–57, Robin #52–53, Azrael #40, Batman Chronicles #12, Batman: Blackgate #1, Batman: Huntress/Spoiler: Blunt Trauma #1, and Batman: Arkham Asylum – Tales of Madness #1	June 2015	978-1401255152	
Batman: Road to No Man's Land Volume 1	Detective Comics #722, 724–726, Batman #555–559, Batman: Shadow of the Bat #75–79, Robin #54, and Batman Chronicles #14	October 2015	978-1401258276	
Batman: Road to No Man's Land Volume 2	Detective Comics #727–729, Batman #560–562, Batman: Shadow of the Bat #80–82, Batman Chronicles #15, Azrael #47–50, and Batman: No Man's Land Secret Files & Origins #1	July 2016	978-1401260637	
Batman: No Man's Land Volume 1	Batman: No Man's Land #1, Batman: Shadow of the Bat #83–86, Batman #563–566, Detective Comics #730–733, Azrael: Agent of the Bat #51–55, Batman: Legends of the Dark Knight #117–118, Batman Chronicles #16	December 2011	978-1401232283	
Batman: No Man's Land Volume 2	Batman #567–568, Detective Comics #734–735, Batman: Legends of the Dark Knight #119–121, Batman: Shadow of the Bat #87–88, Batman Chronicles #17, Robin #67, Nightwing #35–37, Catwoman #72–74, Azrael: Agent of the Bat #56–57, Young Justice: No Man's Land #1	April 2012	978-1401233808	
Batman: No Man's Land Volume 3	Batman #569-71, Detective Comics #736–738, Azrael: Agent of the Bat #58, Batman: Legends of the Dark Knight #122–124, Batman: Shadow of the Bat #89–92, Robin #68–72, and Batman: No Man's Land Secret Files and Origins #1	August 2012	978-1401234560	
Batman: No Man's Land Volume 4	Batman Chronicles #18, Batman #572–574, Detective Comics #739–741, Batman: Legends of the Dark Knight #125–126, Robin #73, Batman: Shadow of the Bat #93–94, Azrael: Agent of the Bat #59–61, Catwoman #75–77, Nightwing #38–39 and Batman: No Man's Land #0	December 2012	978-1401235642	
Batman: Evolution	Detective Comics #743–750	August 2001	978-1-56389-726-9	
Batman: New Gotham Volume 1	Detective Comics #742–753	May 2017	978-1401263676	
Batman: Officer Down	Batman #587, Robin #86, Birds of Prey #27, Catwoman #90, Nightwing #53, Detective Comics #754, Batman: Gotham Knights #13	August 2001	978-1-56389-787-0	
Batman: New Gotham Volume 2	Detective Comics #755–765	March 2018	978-1401277949	
Batman: Bruce Wayne – Murderer?	Batgirl #24, 27, Batman #599–602, Batman: Gotham Knights #25–28, Batman: The 10-Cent Adventure #1, Birds Of Prey #39–41, 43, Detective Comics #766–767, Nightwing #65–66, 68–69 and Robin #98–99	March 2014	978-1401246839	
Batman: Bruce Wayne – Fugitive	Batman #603–607, Detective Comics #768–775, Batman: Gotham Knights #29–32 and Batgirl #29, 33	July 2014	978-1401246822	
Batman: The Man Who Laughs	Detective Comics #784–786 and Batman: The Man Who Laughs	January 2008 (hardcover); February 2009(softcover)	978-1-4012-1622-1; 978-1-4012-1626-9	
Batman: False Faces	Batman #588-590, Detective Comics #787, Wonder Woman #160-161, and Batman: Gotham City Secret Files #1	February 2008	978-1-4012-1640-5	
Batman: War Drums	Detective Comics #790–796 and Robin (vol. 2) #126–128	October 2004	978-1-4012-0341-2	
Batman: War Games Act One – Outbreak	Batman: The 12-Cent Adventure, Detective Comics #797, Batman #631, Batman: Legends of the Dark Knight #182, Nightwing #96, Batman: Gotham Knights #56, Robin #129, Batgirl #55, Catwoman #34	February 2006	978-1401204297	
Batman: War Games Act Two – Tides	Detective Comics #798, Batman: Legends of the Dark Knight #183, Nightwing #97, Batman: Gotham Knights #57, Robin #130, Batgirl #56, Catwoman #35, Batman #632	June 2005	978-1401204303	
Batman: War Games Act Three – Endgame	Batgirl #57, Batman #633, Batman: Gotham Knights #58, Batman: Legends of the Dark Knight #184, Catwoman #36, Detective Comics #799, Nightwing #98, Robin 131	October 2005	978-1401204310	
Batman: City of Crime	Detective Comics #800–808, 811–814	July 2006	978-1-4012-0897-4	
Batman: War Crimes	Batman #643–644, Detective Comics #809–810	February 2006	978-1-4012-0903-2	
Batman Arkham: Victor Zsasz	Batman: Shadow of the Bat #1–4, a story from Batman Chronicles #3, Batman: Batgirl (1998) #1, Detective Comics #815–816, Batman: Streets of Gotham #10–11; a story from Detective Comics v2 #18 and the never-before-published story "Draining," originally intended for Gotham Knights #12.	February 2020	978-1401298975	
Batman: Face the Face	Detective Comics #817–820, Batman #651–654	September 2006	978-1-4012-0910-0	
Batman: Detective	Detective Comics #821–826	April 2007	978-1-4012-1239-1	
Batman: Death and the City	Detective Comics #827–834	November 2007	978-1-4012-1575-0	
Batman: Harley Quinn	Batman: Harley Quinn, Batman: Gotham Knights # 14, 30, Detective Comics #831, 837. Joker's Asylum: Harley Quinn #1, Batman Black and White #1, 3, Legends of the Dark Knight 100-Page Super Spectacular #1, Detective Comics (2011) #23.2	July 2015	978-1401255176	
Batman: The Resurrection of Ra's Al Ghul	Batman #670–671, Robin #168–169, Detective Comics #838–839, Nightwing #138–139, Batman Annual #26 and Robin Annual #7	May 2009	978-1401220327	
Batman: Private Casebook	Detective Comics #840–845 and DC Infinite Halloween Special	December 2008 (hardcover); November 2009 (softcover)	978-1-4012-2009-9; 978-1-4012-2015-0	
Batman: Heart of Hush	Detective Comics #846–850	April 2009 (hardcover); March 2010 (softcover)	978-1-4012-2123-2; 978-1-4012-2124-9	
Batman: Whatever Happened to the Caped Crusader?	Batman #686, Detective Comics #853, Batman Black and White #2, Secret Origins (Volume 2) #36, Secret Origins Special (Volume 2) #1	July 2009	978-1-4012-2303-8	
Batwoman: Elegy	Detective Comics #854–860	July 2010 (hardcover); June 2011 (softcover)	978-1-4012-2692-3; 978-1-4012-3146-0	
Batwoman by Greg Rucka and J.H. Williams III	Detective Comics #854–863	June 2017	978-1401274139	
Batman: Arkham Reborn	Battle for the Cowl: Arkham Asylum #1, Arkham Reborn #1–3, Detective Comics 864–865	August 2010	978-1401227081	
Batman: Impostors	Detective Comics #867–870	August 2011	978-1-4012-3144-6	
Batman: The Black Mirror	Detective Comics #871–881	November 2011	978-1-4012-3206-1	

=== The New 52 ===
The New 52 saw every DC Comics series collected in its entirety in trade paperback form. Notably, collected volumes of Detective Comics vol. 2 were published in hardcover editions first, with paperback editions being delayed until the release of the next hardcover volume.

#	Title	Material Collected	Publication date	ISBN
1	Faces of Death	Detective Comics vol. 2 #1–7	HC: June 2012; SC: April 2013	HC: 978-1401234669; SC: 978-1401234676
2	Scare Tactics	Detective Comics vol. 2 #8–12, #0, Detective Comics Annual vol. 2 #1	HC: April 2013; SC: November 2013	HC: 978-1401238408; SC: 978-1401242657
3	Emperor Penguin	Detective Comics vol. 2 #13–18	HC: November 2013; SC: July 2014	HC: 978-1401242664; SC: 978-1401246346
4	The Wrath	Detective Comics vol. 2 #19–24, Detective Comics Annual vol. 2 #2	HC: July 2014; SC: November 2014	HC: 978-1401246334; SC: 978-1401249977
5	Gothtopia	Detective Comics vol. 2 #25–29	HC: November 2014; SC: May 2015	HC: 978-1401249984; SC: 978-1401254667
6	Icarus	Detective Comics vol. 2 #30–34, Detective Comics Annual vol. 2 #3	HC: May 2015; SC: January 2016	HC: 978-1401254421; SC: 978-1401258023
7	Anarky	Detective Comics vol. 2 #35–40, Detective Comics: Endgame #1, Detective Comics: Futures End #1	HC: January 2016; SC: August 2016	HC: 978-1401257491; SC: 978-1401263546
8	Blood of Heroes	Detective Comics vol. 2 #41–46	HC: August 2016; SC: December 2016	HC: 978-1401263553; SC: 978-1401269241
9	Gordon at War	Detective Comics vol. 2 #47–52	HC: December 2016; SC: June 2017	HC: 978-1401269234; SC: 978-1401274115

Material from Detective Comics vol. 2 was also included in several collections of crossover events, each printed in both hardcover and softcover. In each case, the material consisted of tie-ins to the main event.

Title	Material Collected	Publication date	ISBN
Batman: Night of the Owls	All-Star Western vol. 3 #9; Batman vol. 2 #8–9; Batman Annual vol. 2 #1; Batman: The Dark Knight vol. 2 #9; Detective Comics vol. 2 #9; Batgirl vol. 4 #9; Batwing #9; Birds of Prey vol. 3 #9; Nightwing vol. 3 #8–9; Batman and Robin vol. 2 #9; Catwoman vol. 4 #9; Red Hood and the Outlaws #9	HC: February 2013; SC: November 2013	HC: 978-1401237738; SC: 978-1401242527
The Joker: Death of the Family	Catwoman vol. 4 #13–14; Batgirl vol. 4 #13–16; Suicide Squad vol. 4 #14–15; Batman and Robin vol. 2 #15–16; Nightwing vol. 3 #15–16; Detective Comics vol. 2 #15–16; Red Hood and the Outlaws #15–16; Teen Titans vol. 4 #15–16	HC: October 2013; SC: April 2014	HC: 978-1401242343; SC: 978-1401246464
DC Comics: Zero Year	Action Comics vol. 2 #25; Batgirl vol. 4 #25; Batman vol. 2 #24–25; Batwing #25; Batwoman #25; Birds of Prey vol. 3 #25; Catwoman vol. 4 #25; Detective Comics vol. 2 #25; Green Arrow vol. 6 #25; Green Lantern Corps vol. 3 #25; Nightwing vol. 3 #25; Red Hood and The Outlaws #25; The Flash vol. 4 #25	HC: November 2014; SC: April 2015	HC: 978-1401249373; SC: 978-1401253370
The Joker: Endgame	Batman vol. 2 #35–40; Batman Annual vol. 2 #3; Gotham Academy: Endgame #1; Batgirl: Endgame #1; Detective Comics: Endgame #1; Arkham Manor: Endgame #1	HC: September 2015; SC: May 2016	HC: 978-1401258771; SC: 978-1401261658

=== DC Rebirth to present ===
Volumes 1–5 were published with DC Rebirth trade dress on the cover. This was dropped from volume 6 onwards, coinciding with the end of "DC Rebirth" branding on the series from issue #970 onwards.

Numbering on the collected editions was restarted from volume 1 with the start of Peter Tomasi's run as writer in issue #994. The first three volumes were published in hardcover editions first, before being reprinted in paperback.

#	Title	Material collected	Pages	Cover	Date Published	ISBN
Original printings
1	Rise of the Batmen	Detective Comics #934–940	176	TPB	February 1, 2017	978-1401267995
Batman: Night of the Monster Men		Batman vol. 3 #7–8; Detective Comics #941–942; Nightwing vol. 4 #5–6	144	TPB	February 22, 2017	978-1401270674
2	The Victim Syndicate	Detective Comics #943–949	168	TPB	May 10, 2017	978-1401268916
3	League of Shadows	Detective Comics #950–956	184	TPB	October 4, 2017	978-1401276096
4	Deus Ex Machina	Detective Comics #957–962	144	TPB	December 13, 2017	978-1401274979
5	A Lonely Place of Living	Detective Comics #963–968	144	TPB	April 4, 2018	978-1401278229
6	Fall of the Batmen	Detective Comics #969–974 and Annual #1	184	TPB	June 20, 2018	978-1401281458
7	Batmen Eternal	Detective Comics #975–981	176	TPB	September 5, 2018	978-1401284213
8	On The Outside	Detective Comics #982–987	144	TPB	December 5, 2018	978-1401285289
9	Deface The Face	Detective Comics #988–993	168	TPB	April 3, 2019	978-1401290641
1	Mythology	Detective Comics #994–999	144	HC	September 10, 2019	978-1779501622
1	Mythology	Detective Comics #994–999	144	TPB	February 20, 2020	978-1779501721
2	Arkham Knight	Detective Comics #1001–1005	144	HC	December 17, 2019	978-1779501646
2	Arkham Knight	Detective Comics #1001–1005	144	TPB	September 8, 2020	978-1779502513
3	Greetings From Gotham	Detective Comics #1006–1011	144	HC	April 8, 2020	978-1401288617
3	Greetings From Gotham	Detective Comics #1006–1011	144	TPB	September 29, 2020	978-1779505545
4	Cold Vengeance	Detective Comics #1012–1019	192	TPB	December 29, 2020	978-1779504555
5	The Joker War	Detective Comics #1020–1027 and Annual #3; Batman: Pennyworth R.I.P	256	HC	March 23, 2021	978-1779509222
5	The Joker War	Detective Comics #1020–1027 and Annual #3; Batman: Pennyworth R.I.P	256	TPB	August 22, 2023	978-1779521125
6	The Road to Ruin	Detective Comics #1028–1033	144	HC	October 5, 2021	978-1779512703
1	The Neighborhood	Detective Comics #1034–1039	203	HC	February 8, 2022	978-1779514226
1	The Neighborhood	Detective Comics #1034–1039	203	TPB	February 21, 2023	978-1779519863
2	Fear State	Detective Comics #1040–1045, backup stories from #1040–1043 and Batman Secret Files: Huntress #1	240	HC	July 5, 2022	978-1779515551
2	Fear State	Detective Comics #1040–1045, backup stories from #1040–1043 and Batman Secret Files: Huntress #1	240	TPB	June 27, 2023	978-1779520180
3	Arkham Rising	Detective Comics #1046, backup stories from #1044–1046 and Annual 2021	128	HC	September 13, 2022	978-1779518057
3	Arkham Rising	Detective Comics #1046, backup stories from #1044–1046 and Annual 2021	128	TPB	January 23, 2024	978-1779520012
—	Shadows of the Bat: House of Gotham	Detective Comics backup stories from #1047–1058	144	HC	December 22, 2022	978-1779517012
—	Shadows of the Bat: House of Gotham	Detective Comics backup stories from #1047–1058	144	TPB	January 9, 2024	978-1779520821
—	Shadows of the Bat: The Tower	Detective Comics #1047–1058	296	HC	December 27, 2022	978-1779517005
—	Shadows of the Bat: The Tower	Detective Comics #1047–1058	296	TPB	January 9, 2024	978-1779520838
4	Riddle Me This	Detective Comics #1059–1061	112	HC	April 11, 2023	978-1779520678
4	Riddle Me This	Detective Comics #1059–1061	112	TPB	April 9, 2024	978-1779524867
1	Gotham Nocturne: Overture	Detective Comics #1062–1065	152	HC	August 15, 2023	978-1779520944
1	Gotham Nocturne: Overture	Detective Comics #1062–1065	152	TPB	July 30, 2024	978-1779525567
2	Gotham Nocturne: Act I	Detective Comics #1066–1070 and Annual 2022	232	HC	February 13, 2024	978-1779524621
2	Gotham Nocturne: Act I	Detective Comics #1066–1070 and Annual 2022	232	TPB	August 13, 2024	978-1779529381
3	Gotham Nocturne: Act II	Detective Comics #1071–1075	184	HC	September 17, 2024	978-1779527424
3	Gotham Nocturne: Act II	Detective Comics #1071–1075	184	TPB	September 17, 2024	978-1779529428
4	Gotham Nocturne Intermezzo: Batman, Outlaw	Detective Comics #1076–1080	232	HC	December 31, 2024	978-1779528568
4	Gotham Nocturne Intermezzo: Batman, Outlaw	Detective Comics #1076–1080	232	TPB	December 31, 2024	978-1779529459
5	Gotham Nocturne: Act III	Detective Comics #1081–1089	320	HC	March 11, 2025	978-1799500698
5	Gotham Nocturne: Act III	Detective Comics #1081–1089	320	TPB	March 11, 2025	978-1799500728
1	Mercy of the Father	Detective Comics #1090–1096	184	HC	July 1, 2025	978-1799501800
1	Mercy of the Father	Detective Comics #1090–1096	184	TPB	July 1, 2025	978-1799501831
2	Elixir	Detective Comics #1097–1100	184	HC	February 10, 2026	978-1799502616
2	Elixir	Detective Comics #1097–1100	184	TPB	February 10, 2026	978-1799502654
3	The Courage That Kills	Detective Comics #1101–1106	168	HC	August 11, 2026	978-1799508991
3	The Courage That Kills	Detective Comics #1101–1106	168	TPB	August 11, 2026	978-1799509004
Deluxe hardcovers
Book 1		Detective Comics #934–949	388	OHC	November 7, 2017	978-1401276089
Book 2		Detective Comics #950–962	320	OHC	May 15, 2018	978-1401278571
Book 3		Detective Comics #963–973 and Annual #1	320	OHC	October 30, 2018	978-1401284817
Book 4		Detective Comics #974–982	296	OHC	April 23, 2019	978-1401289102
Issue #1000		Detective Comics #1000	160	OHC	June 18, 2019	978-1401294199

=== Millennium Editions ===
In 2000 and 2001, DC reprinted several of its most notable issues in the Millennium Edition series. Seven issues of Detective Comics were reprinted in this format.
