= Revolver (DC Comics) =

Graphic novel by Matt Kindt

- Cover to Revolver (art by Matt Kindt).
- Date: July 2010
- Main characters: Sam
- Page count: 180 pages
- Publisher: DC Comics (Vertigo)

Creative team
- Writers: Matt Kindt
- Artists: Matt Kindt
- Letterers: Steve Wands
- Creators: Matt Kindt
- ISBN: 978-1401222413 (Hardcover); 978-1401222420 (Softcover)

Revolver is a graphic novel created, written, and drawn by Matt Kindt. It was first published in a hardcover format by the Vertigo imprint of DC Comics in July 2010. Kindt's intent was to craft a comic book story in a way that made it unfilmable. Images were created using only blue and brown lines.

In the story, Sam is a man who lives each day twice: first in a normal world, and then again in an alternate world which is suffering many types of disasters simultaneously. Sam finds some commonalities between the two worlds and must eventually choose which one to live in.

Critics drew comparisons between Revolver and popular films and novels like Inception and Fight Club. Opinions were mixed in regards to both the story and the art, and critics were divided on whether or not the execution of Revolver was an improvement over Kindt's previous published works.

== Publication history ==
Prior to creating Revolver, Matt Kindt had been a designer for Sporting News and had published comic work with Top Shelf Productions (Pistolwhip, Super Spy) and Dark Horse Comics (3 Story). The idea for this story came from Kindt's general fascination with the end of the world, and specifically from imagining if terrible news stories about the economy, diseases, and natural disasters all occurred at the same time. He said that he "long[s] to be transported to another time and place that feels real". Some of his former co-workers make appearances in the story.

When crafting the plot, Kindt was trying to combine elements from the 1993 film Groundhog Day with the 1999 film Fight Club. It was Kindt's first work set in the modern era instead of the past, and also his first work focused on a single character. Kindt set the story in St. Louis and Kansas City because he felt it needed to be in the Midwestern United States to fit the story's themes.

Kindt tried to explore the comic medium in ways that would make the story unfilmable. His page layouts use a steady grid with three tiers. The story was paced like a webcomic, with each page telling a clear piece of the story. Late in the project, Kindt decided to incorporate a news ticker into his page numbers. At the bottom of each page, a line of text unrelated to the action on the page provided background information on the setting. Near the middle of the ticker, the page number is incorporated into the text in a bold format. For example, page 11 presents the number as a body count and page 36 presents it as the cost of gasoline.

Kindt colored Revolver with only two tones, blue and brown. He differentiates between the two worlds Sam inhabits by alternating which color is dominant and which is used for highlights. The boring world is primarily blue, and the apocalyptic world is primarily brown.

The book shares a fictional universe with Kindt's other works and the character PK Verve is the uniting element. Although he is killed in Revolver, Verve appeared in Kindt's follow up work, MIND MGMT, as the husband of the main antagonist.

Revolver was released in hardcover by the Vertigo imprint of DC Comics in July 2010, followed by a softcover edition in July 2011.

== Plot ==
After a night out drinking, Sam wakes up with a hangover. When he arrives at the Chicago newspaper office where he works, he discovers it has been bombed and the city is in a panic. He is helping his boss, Jan, evacuate when the two are confronted by her angry ex-boyfriend. During a panicked scuffle, Sam kills the ex-boyfriend. He returns with Jan to his apartment, where they fall asleep. Sam wakes up alone the next morning and his injuries have vanished. He discovers it is the same day, and that the city is not under attack. He is certain what he remembers was not a dream.

Sam continues to live each day twice, alternating between the two worlds. In the chaotic one, he works with Jan and two other coworkers to produce a leaflet-style newspaper reporting the disasters. In the calmer one, he grows increasingly frustrated with how superficial his life is. He uses his time in the calmer world to learn skills that aid him in the more frantic one, such as hot-wiring a car. He and Jan become close in one world while they remain distant and unfriendly in the other. Meanwhile, Sam's relationship with his girlfriend Maria becomes sour.

The man suspected of masterminding the bombings, P. K. Verve, is a motivational speaker in the calmer world. Suspecting a connection between Verve and the dual worlds, Sam seeks to meet the motivational speaker. He convinces the unfriendly Jan to finance his trip by blackmailing her with a confession she made in the chaotic world.

When Sam finally meets Verve, he learns that both of them are alternating between worlds, but that Verve originated in the chaotic one. Verve claims the two divergent worlds were created when his brother died in a government-arranged plane crash one day and was alive the next. Verve has used his motivational speaking to travel and learn secrets which he then uses to commit terrorist acts as vengeance in the other world. Hoping Sam will be his ally, Verve arranges for them to meet in the chaotic world.

Sam meets with the military and takes a tracer with him to the meeting. After confirming he is with Verve, the military bombs the hideout, killing them both. Sam awakens in the calmer world and stops entering the alternate one. He abandons his former lifestyle and convinces Maria to leave town with him. They head for one of Verve's seminars, where Sam is planning to kill him.

== Reception ==
Upon release, the graphic novel was compared to Kurt Vonnegut's novel Slaughterhouse-Five, Chuck Palahniuk's novel Fight Club and Christopher Nolan's film Inception. Revolver was proof for Multiversity Comics that Kindt was an "underrated talent". Wired saw it as "a cleverly weighty interrogation of identity and community in an age of omnipresent media". In combination with Kindt's prior works, NPR felt Revolver makes "quietly compelling arguments for the comics medium's narrative potential". While Booklist and Comic Book Resources faulted Revolver for lacking the storytelling twists of Super Spy and 3 Story, the faster pace was appreciated by the Los Angeles Times. Publishers Weekly found the narrative to be hindered in some areas by heavy exposition, but described it as "thought-provoking". Despite this contemporary praise, Revolver was described as a "forgotten" Vertigo comic by Geek.com when it was included in a 2017 list of comic properties that could be adapted into successful TV show.

In his review for The Los Angeles Times, Ed Park said the title Revolver came from the repetitive way Sam's two lives followed one another, but noted similar themes between the comic and the Beatles' "schizophrenic" 1966 album Revolver. Park went on to say the plot began "with the sort of 9/11 nightmare that's become a permanent feature of our headspace". ComicsAlliance found the story to be realistic and character-driven, and Comic Book Resources praised the portrayal of female characters in particular. Conversely, IGN thought Sam was neither engaging nor sympathetic, and his journey did not have a fulfilling end. The explanation of the story's hook seemed so contrived and irrelevant to the emotional core of the narrative that The Comics Journal speculated it was only addressed because of interference from DC editorial.

Kindt's art is an acquired taste according to Wired, but other reviewers offered less qualified praise for it. The Comics Journal said the "fragile" and "delicate" line work gave Revolver a "visceral charge". The use of dual tone instead of full color was called "brilliant" by Multiversity Comics and credited with giving the comic a melancholy feel by ComicsAlliance.
