= Tom Pappalardo =

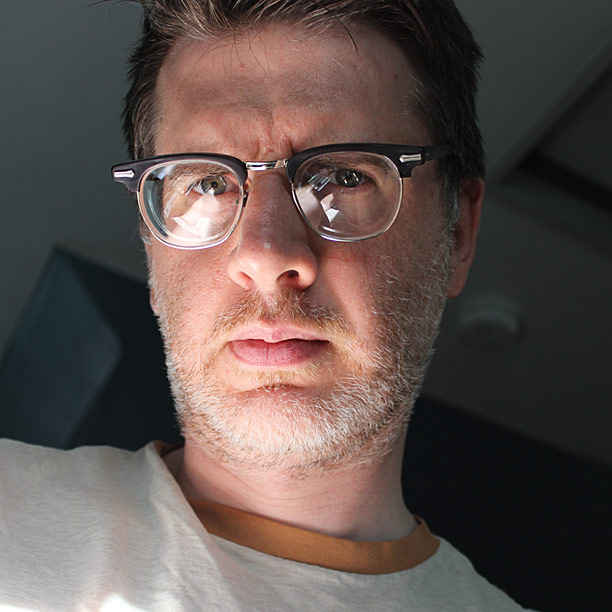
- Born: Thomas Pappalardo; 1973 (age 51–52); Haverhill, Massachusetts, U.S.
- Occupation(s): Singer-songwriter, musician, cartoonist, graphic designer, author
- Years active: 1991 – present
- Musical career
- Genres: rock
- Instrument(s): Vocals, guitar, bass guitar
- Website: tompappalardo.com standard-design.com

Tom Pappalardo (born 1973) is a graphic designer from Easthampton, Massachusetts as well as an author, illustrator, and musician. Easthampton is north of Springfield, Massachusetts.

Pappalardo designed the Easthampton mural in the Easthampton Cottage Street Cultural District, dedicated in June, 2008. He and R. Sturgis Cunningham perform as the guitar-drums duo The Demographic. He has published an illustrated novel, a collection of comics, and an illustrated collection of essays. His 1996 comic "Alec Dear" (illustrated by Matt Smith) received a Xeric grant.

== Bibliography ==
- Alec Dear (comic, writer, 1996)
- Through The Wood, Beneath the Moon (comic, writer, 1998)
- Failure, Incompetence (comic, 2005)
- Famous Fighters (comic with Matt Smith, 2005)
- Even Lions Will Fear You: Two Years of Whiskey! Tango! Foxtrot! (comic, 2009)
- OPT10 (comic, 2010)
- OPT11 (comic, 2011)
- Everything You Didn't Ask For (comic collection, 2014)
- One More Cup Of Coffee (2016)
- Broken Lines (2018)
- Mind The Gap (chapbook, 2019)
- Bygone (chapbook, 2019)
- Satellites: Nine Stories (short story collection, 2022)

== Discography ==
- Basement Make-Out Party (1999, The No-Shadow Kick)
- The Promo EP (2001, The No-Shadow Kick)
- Spatializing Sound In The Time Domain (2005, The No-Shadow Kick)
- Verse Chorus Curse (2011, The Demographic)
- Listen Close (2013, The Demographic)
- HIATUS (2021, The Demographic)
- I HATE US (2021 EP, The Demographic)

== See also ==
- List of American comic creators
