= Dept. H =

Comic book series

Publication information
- Publisher: Dark Horse Comics
- Schedule: Monthly
- Format: Ongoing series
- Publication date: April 2016 – March 2018
- No. of issues: 24

Creative team
- Written by: Matt Kindt
- Penciller: Matt Kindt
- Colorist: Sharlene Kindt

Dept. H is an American comic book series created by Matt Kindt and published through Dark Horse Comics. The first issue, released on April 20, 2016, sold an estimated 9300 copies. According to the review aggregation website Comic Book Roundup, it received mostly positive reviews, averaging 8.6/10 based on 24 reviews from critics.

The story is about a suspicious death in an underwater research laboratory and the subsequent investigation led by the victim's daughter.

== Collected editions ==
| Title | Material collected | Published date | ISBN |
|---|---|---|---|
| Dept. H Vol. 1: Pressure | Dept. H #1-6 | January 2017 | 978-1616559892 |
| Dept. H Vol. 2: After the Flood | Dept. H #7-12 | July 2017 | 978-1616559908 |
| Dept. H Vol. 3: Decompressed | Dept. H #13-17 | January 2018 | 978-1616559915 |
| Dept. H Vol. 4 Lifeboat | Dept. H #18-24 | July 2018 | 978-1616559922 |
| Dept. H Omnibus Volume 1 | Dept. H #1-12 | June 2019 | 978-1506710938 |
| Dept. H Omnibus Volume 2 | Dept. H #13-24 | November 2019 | 978-1506710945 |

== Film adaptation ==
On September 28, 2021, it was announced that streaming service Netflix was developing a film adaptation of the comic book series to be directed by Alice Waddington.
