= Matt Smith (illustrator) =

American illustrator

Matt Smith is an illustrator based in Cambridge, Massachusetts who is best known for his work in such children's magazines as Cricket, Highlights for Children, and Muse, as well as the graphic novel edition of Kate DiCamillo's The Tale of Despereaux. His original graphic novel, Barbarian Lord, was published in 2014 and reviewed favorably by Publishers Weekly and Kirkus Reviews, which called it a Game of Thrones for younger readers. He illustrated Matt Kindt's Folklords (2020).

Smith is also known for creating album cover art and concert posters for Minibosses and as a contributor to FORTY-3, the official Massachusetts College of Art comic journal. He received a Xeric grant for the illustrated poem "Alec Dear", written by Tom Pappalardo of Standard Design. Smith was one of 5 winners of the 2007 Ain't It Cool News 8-bit Art Contest.
