= Folklords =

2019 comic book miniseries

Publication information
- Publisher: Boom! Comics
- Format: Limited series
- Publication date: November 2019 – March 2020
- No. of issues: 5
- Main character: Ansel

Creative team
- Created by: Matt Kindt and Matt Smith
- Written by: Matt Kindt
- Artist: Matt Smith
- Letterer: Jim Campbell
- Colorist: Chris O'Halloran
- Editor: Eric Harburn

Folklords is an American comic book miniseries by Matt Kindt and Matt Smith, published by Boom! Comics in 2019 and 2020.

== Plot ==
Ansel, a human boy living in a magical world ruled by the authoritarian Librarians, is haunted by dreams of the modern world. He dresses in contemporary clothing and copies things that he sees in his dreams, which sets him apart from his peers. Eventually, he sets out to find the mythical Folklords in the hopes that they can help him reach the world he dreams of.

== Reception ==
The series received mixed to positive reviews from critics, who praised its handling of the fantasy genre, storytelling and art.

Jodi Odgers of CBR.com gave the first issue a positive review, described the series' premise as "simple and enticing", praising the worldbuilding and likeability of the protagonist. In a review of Issue #1, Vishal Gullapalli of AIPT praised the series' characters and art style, but felt that the issue was too short to allow proper pacing or the establishment of real stakes. Zack Quaintance of Comics Bookcase gave the same issue a 9.8/10, writing that it was "basically flawless, from writer Matt Kindt’s pithy and genuine scripting, to artist Matt Smith and Chris O’Halloran’s bright visuals and taut panel layouts."

Hannibal Tabu of Bleeding Cool criticized the finale's writing, saying that the ending "borrows too much from Frank L. Baum", but praised the artwork.

It won the Ringo Spirit Award in 2021.
