= Slam Bradley =

Fictional comic book character

- Interior artwork from Catwoman Secret Files & Origins #1 (September 2002). Art by Michael Lark.

Publication information
- Publisher: DC Comics
- First appearance: Detective Comics #1 (March 1937)
- Created by: Malcolm Wheeler-Nicholson; Jerry Siegel; Joe Shuster

In-story information
- Species: Human
- Team affiliations: Gotham City Police Department
- Abilities: Master street fighter and bar fighter; Expert detective

Samuel Emerson "Slam" Bradley is a fictional character that has appeared in American comic books published by DC Comics. He is a private detective who exists in DC's main shared universe. The character concept was created by DC Comics founder Malcolm Wheeler-Nicholson and developed by Jerry Siegel and Joe Shuster, who both later became more well known as the co-creators of Superman. As one of the first ever DC characters, the character first appears in the Golden Age of Comic Books in the anthology title Detective Comics, being introduced in the first issue. He later commonly was associated with Batman and other spinoff Batman characters when revived.

Slam Bradley appears in Batwoman, portrayed by Kurt Szarka.

== Publication history ==
=== Creation ===
First appearance of Slam Bradley, from Detective Comics #1, March 1937. Art by Joe Shuster.

Conceived by Malcolm Wheeler-Nicholson and developed by Superman creators Jerry Siegel and Joe Shuster, the character first appeared in Detective Comics #1 (March 1937) and is depicted as a hard bitten, tough private eye who loves working for dames, but prefers the platonic company of his boy sidekick "Shorty" Morgan. The character originally starred in his own stories during the Golden Age, and later was revived in supporting character roles. Slam Bradley was originally outlined by Wheeler-Nicholson in a May 13, 1936 letter to Siegel. The letter stated: "We need some more work from you. We are getting out at least one new magazine in July and possibly two. The first one is definitely in the works. It will contain longer stories and fewer. From you and Shuster we need sixteen pages monthly. We want a detective hero called 'Slam Bradley'. He is to be an amateur, called in by the police to help unravel difficult cases. He should combine both brains and brawn, be able to think quickly and reason cleverly and able as well to slam bang his way out of a bar room brawl or mob attack. Take every opportunity to show him in a torn shirt with swelling biceps and powerful torso ala Flash Gordon. The pages are to run the same size as New Comics but to contain eight panels a page instead of six."

Reportedly, the character's appearance was based on actor Victor McLaglen. Some commentators have noted the similarity of Bradley's appearance to Superman, Siegel and Shuster's most famous creation for DC, who first appeared the following year, although the two had created the earliest version of Superman in 1933, and were shopping the character around the comic industry around the time Bradley was created. Similarities have also been noted between Shorty and future Superman villain Mister Mxyzptlk, who first appeared in 1944.

=== Reprints ===
The Golden Age Slam Bradley stories have never been reprinted, except for once on microfiche. In September 2018, DC Comics announced the Detective Comics: Before Batman Volumes 1 and 2 Hardcover Omnibus Set, which would reprint stories scanned from original copies from the first 26 issues of the series prior to Batman's first appearance, which would have included several early Slam Bradley stories. However, the omnibus set was cancelled in November of that year, with no official reasons given.

== Comics appearances ==
=== Golden Age of Comics ===
The character first appeared as one of several ongoing features, in the debut issue of Detective Comics – originally an anthology series – in March 1937. He debuted a year before Superman's first appearance, and two years before Batman would become the title's lead feature. In Detective Comics #20, Slam Bradley learned how to use magic, and used it to turn another magician into an ape. The character's adventures continued as Batman was introduced in issue #27, continuing as a supporting feature until Detective Comics #152 (October 1949). According to Jess Nevins' Encyclopedia of Golden Age Superheroes, "He fights ordinary criminals, Yellow Perils, stage magicians, the Human Fly, creatures from the year Two Billion, the Man-Beast, and on at least one occasion space aliens."

Slam was replaced in Detective Comics #153 by Roy Raymond, TV Detective. Bradley would not make another significant appearance for over 32 years and his sidekick Shorty Morgan disappeared completely.

The character was originally operating out of Cleveland, then later in New York City, Slam and his sidekick "Shorty" Morgan often had humorous, fight-filled adventures, often going undercover in various professions to catch their man. Though most stories had a mystery element, "Slam" was more likely to solve them with his fists than his brains.

=== Revival ===
The character reappeared in Detective Comics #500 (March 1981). In a story titled "The Too Many Cooks... Caper!", an aging Bradley joined other DC detectives, such as Jason Bard, Pow Wow Smith, Roy Raymond, the Human Target, and Mysto, Magician Detective in solving the murder of a fellow retiring detective. The character returned again in Detective Comics #572 (the 50th anniversary issue), teaming up with detectives Batman, Robin, Elongated Man, and Sherlock Holmes.

He appeared in the Superman titles in the 1990s, working for the Metropolis Police Department. However, this incarnation of the character was short-lived. When an older Slam Bradley later appeared in Detective Comics, it was explained that the Metropolis character was Slam Bradley, Jr.

In 2001, writer Ed Brubaker and artist Darwyn Cooke revived the character in the four-part serial "Trail of the Catwoman" in Detective Comics #759-762. In this story, he investigates the death of Selina Kyle and in the process runs afoul of the Batman. This incarnation of the character is a former police officer in his late 50s who has always worked in Gotham City (contradicting the previous Cleveland, New York, and Metropolis settings). Bradley then became a supporting cast member in the Catwoman ongoing series. He reveals that he has a son named Sam Bradley Jr. who is a detective on the Gotham City Police Department. Sam Jr. also worked when detectives James Lenahan and Carl Worth in getting close to Black Mask when posing as Smart Bomb. Sam Jr. and Selina Kyle engaged in a romantic relationship that produced a child, Helena Kyle. Slam made an appearance during a flashback in the story arc "Heart of Hush", where he was the primary detective in the murder of Thomas Elliot's father.

Bradley is the main protagonist in the 2022 Tom King/Phil Hester miniseries Gotham City: Year One, a story set in 1961 Gotham involving Slam with Bruce Wayne's grandparents.

=== Outside mainstream continuity ===
The character appears in Darwyn Cooke's 2003/2004 DC: The New Frontier as a private investigator working alongside John Jones, and in Cooke's Solo #5. He also appeared in Legends of the Dark Knight #5, in which he had to team up with Batman to clear his name of a murder charge. This story was released digitally as Legends of the Dark Knight #11-13.

Absolute Green Lantern features a version of Slam Bradley conceptually merged with Paul Kirk, Richard Nelson and Rick Flag. An agent of the World War 2 spy agency Argent, Sam Bradley assumed the name Paul Kirk while the original was operating in Switzerland, much to Kirk's bemusement. When Kirk disappears, Bradley renames himself Rick Flag and takes control of Argent, renaming it the Department of Extranormal Operations and repurposing it to hunting down superhumans, as well as killing any agent who refuses to comply. Flag subjects himself to the MK-Ultra Project, only to find himself facing the Manhunter Mind. The entity sees Flag as a useful agent on Earth and resurrects him, but the experience drives him insane. Redubbing himself "Uncle Sam", he slaughters the doctors in the room, before dedicating the D.E.O. as a Manhunter front.

== In other media ==
- The New Frontier incarnation of "Slam" Bradley appears in Justice League: The New Frontier, voiced by Jim Meskimen.
- "Slam" Bradley appears in the Batwoman episode "How Queer Everything Is Today!" portrayed by Kurt Szarka. This version is a member of the Gotham City Police Department.

== Controversy ==
Slam Bradley's comics have a long history of racism, in which the character is juxtaposed against Yellow Peril caricatures. This is explored in-universe in New Super-Man #16, where Kong Kenan is horrified to see Bradley attacking Chinese-American civilians.

Criticism has also been directed towards the portrayal of women in the Golden Age Bradley stories. They have been described as "often feisty but exist in a very objectified way to be ogled, rescued, kissed, then discarded forever to the limbo of single-issue appearances."

It has been speculated that the planned Detective Comics: Before Batman omnibus set was cancelled due to the stereotypes in the stories featuring Bradley and other early Detective Comics characters that would have been reprinted.
