= Shadows of the Bat =

Comic book story arc

- Publisher: DC Comics
- Publication date: December 2021 – March 2022
- Genre: Superhero
Title(s)
Detective Comics (vol. 2) #1047-1058
- Main character(s): Batman; Kate Kane; Dick Grayson; Barbara Gordon; Cassandra Cain; Stephanie Brown; Huntress; Harley Quinn; Scarecrow; Psycho-Pirate; Penguin

Creative team
- Writer: Mariko Tamaki
- Penciller: Ivan Reis Max Raynor Amancay Nahuelpan
- Inker: Danny Miki
- Letterer: Steve Wands
- Colorist: Brad Anderson Jordie Bellaire
- Editor: Paul Kaminski

"Shadows of the Bat" is a 12-issue weekly comic book event published in December 2021, mainly set in the Detective Comics series. Set after "Fear State", the storyline features the Bat-Family dealing with a new villain and Arkham Tower being created in Gotham City. The event received positive reviews from critics who praised the action, story, and art.

== Publication history ==
After the announcement of James Tynion IV departure from Batman after Fear State, DC Comics revealed the new event, where Batman and his allies must deal with a new villain and how the Arkham Tower will cause a split between the Bat Family. It was also revealed that Batman will leave Gotham City temporarily in order to deal with a new villain called Abyss, leaving the Bat-Family in charge of Gotham City.

== Main plot ==
=== Prelude ===
Batman remembers the time when Thomas Wayne tried to save a mentally ill individual name Peter Faust after they tried to murder him and his wife when Bruce was young. In the present day, Lucius Fox meets with representatives of Mayor Nakano (Gotham City's new mayor) in discussion of creating Arkham Tower to rehabilitate criminals since Arkham Asylum is not seen as effective. Nightwing and Batman investigate with Nightwing wondering if Arkham Asylum is even effective since that is where the Bat Family just lock criminals without rehabilitating them. Nightwing and Batman apprehend Peter Faust, where Nightwing asks Batman why can't they send irredeemable people to better prisons in order to prevent them from hurting other people.

While the police are escorting Peter Faust, their car explodes and Faust is captured by a mysterious group of people. Nightwing and Batman manage to find Faust after determining where he got inspiration for his costume and prevent him from committing suicide. Nightwing gets in a confrontation with police officers, and therapist Chase Meridian admires Nightwing's courage for wanting to rehabilitate criminals and plans to support Nightwing.

=== Main plot ===
The main story is told in a nonlinear fashion. After Arkham Asylum was blown up and Scarecrow nearly took over Gotham City, Mayor Nakano decides to create Arkham Tower in order to treat prisoners instead of punish them. A man named Dr. Wear decides to show an example of Nero XIX (an enemy who nearly killed Nakano in "Fear State") as completely rehabilitated. Wear wants Dr. Chase Meridian to work with him in rehabilitating criminals. Kate Kane goes undercover at the Tower, being hired in under the alias of Dr. Lisa Frow, a psychiatrist, in order to investigate Wear, the facility itself, and the "miraculous" methods keeping the patients under control. Helena Bertinelli, due to her continued ability to see violent acts through a victim's eyes as a result of her parasitic infection during "Fear State", voluntarily checks in to Arkham Tower as a patient to receive treatment.

21 days after the Tower opens, Batwoman tells Barbara Gordon that there is a new drug on the streets and Arkham Tower was bombed. The criminals kill Dr. Wear, and Cassandra Cain, Nightwing, and Batwoman go to Arkham Tower to investigate when they hear Helena is missing. In a flashback, Wear wants to help cure prisoners because Ana Vulson, his mother, attacked him, and Mr. Freeze is rehabilitated. Before the Arkham Tower was bombed, Batwoman investigates the Arkham Tower and sees a previous criminal and Vulson in the tower. Cassandra Cain follows a girl who met with Wear and Batwoman meets Huntress who's memory is gone and is "rehabilitated". Batwoman escapes when the police arrives, and Nightwing wonders how the Arkham Tower has "rehabilitated" criminals using drugs. Nightwing remembers how Huntress has been acting more violent and goes to Arkham Tower to get treatment. Nightwing goes to Arkham Tower to investiage and meets Mr. Freeze, and it's revealed that Psycho-Pirate is also one of the leaders of Arkham Tower. Psycho-Pirate was trying to escape from people, and is responsible for the drugs that help make criminals rehabilitated and the recent drug deals that Barbara Gordon and Nightwing are trying to take down, and Penguin is one of the ringleaders. Psycho-Pirate struggles to control the Arkham Tower residents (including Nightwing) and passes out briefly which causes pandemonium to occur in the tower. Wear finds Psycho-Pirate and makes him take control of the Arkham Tower once more.

Batwoman reveals that she put a listening device on Meridian, but Meridian (under the influence of Psycho-Pirate) hangs up to prevent anyone from listening in. Cassandra Cain, Stephanie Brown, and Batwoman take down a drug deal that was heading for the Arkham Tower. Dr. Wear meets up with Penguin to talk about the Bat Family interfering with the Drug Deals, and tells a group of criminals to kill a woman who was a witness to the illegal operations. Cassandra Cain prevents that from happening, and Nightwing goes to investigate when he encounters Psycho-Pirate. Nightwing breaks Psycho-Pirate's mind control, which breaks Psycho-Pirate's other holds on the inmates and criniminals which causes a criminal named Siphon to stab an innocent person and pull a gun on Dr. Wear.

Siphon kills Dr. Wear and the criminals take Mayor Nakano's wife hostage in the Arkham Tower. Nero Xix, Ana Vulson, and Siphon plan to take control of the Arkham Tower. Huntress fights Vulson but is stabbed by Huntress and is nearly killed by Mister Freeze before Nightwing arrives with a defeated Psycho-Pirate. Psycho-Pirate escapes, and in the confusion Nightwing falls into a hole and is captured by Scarecrow. Huntress defeats Dr. Freeze, and Harley Quinn saves Dr. Chase, revealing that she was in the Arkham Tower all along. Harley and Huntress meet to try to save Nightwing as the rest of the Bat-family (Batwoman, Tim Drake, Stephanie Brown, Cassandra Cain) arrive, but Scarecrow throws Nightwing off the tower and Batman saves Nightwing.

Ana Vulson shoots Psycho-Pirate in the chest, and Scarecrow takes Psycho-Pirate and Mayor Nakano's wife to a secret room. Huntress uses her ability to see where Vulson is and defeats her. Tim Drake, Stephanie Brown, and Batwoman take down Penguin's men who are storming Arkham Tower and they all meet up with Batman to confront Scarecrow. Nakano's wife helps Psycho-Pirate be more confident to prevent Batman from falling under Scarecrow's fear toxin, and Nakano's wife wears Psycho-Pirate's mask. In the aftermath, it is revealed that Dr. Wear was a con artist who created the Arkham Tower to steal city funds. Wear's wife receives flowers from Huntress, Batman and the family arrest Scarecrow and take down Penguin's men when Batman hears Riddler calling him out to challenge him.

== Collected editions ==
| Title | Material collected | Published date | ISBN |
|---|---|---|---|
| Batman: Shadows of the Bat: The Tower | Material from Detective Comics #1047-1058 | December 2022 | 978-1779517005 |
| Batman: Shadows of the Bat: House of Gotham | Material from Detective Comics #1047-1058 | December 2022 | 978-1779517012 |

== Critical reception ==
According to Comic Book Roundup, Detective Comics #1047 received an average score of 8.6 out of 10 based on 13 reviews.

According to Comic Book Roundup, Detective Comics #1048 received an average score of 8.3 out of 10 based on 11 reviews.

According to Comic Book Roundup, Detective Comics #1049 received an average score of 8.3 out of 10 based on 11 reviews.

According to Comic Book Roundup, Detective Comics #1050 received an average score of 8.6 out of 10 based on 14 reviews.

According to Comic Book Roundup, Detective comics #1051 received an average score of 7.8 out of 10 based on 13 reviews.

According to Comic Book Roundup, Detective Comics #1052 received an average score of 7.4 out of 10 based on 14 reviews.

According to Comic Book Roundup, Detective Comics #1053 received an average score of 7.7 out of 10 based on 13 reviews.

According to Comic Book Roundup, Detective Comics #1054 received an average score of 7.7 out of 10 based on 13 reviews.

According to Comic Book Roundup, Detective Comics #1055 received an average score of 8 out of 10 based on 13 reviews.

According to Comic Book Roundup, Detective Comics #1056 received an average score of 7.8 out of 10 based on 12 reviews.

According to Comic Book Roundup, Detective Comics #1057 received an average score of 7.7 out of 10 based on 11 reviews.

According to Comic Book Roundup, Detective Comics #1058 received an average score of 7 out of 10 based on 14 reviews.
