= MIND MGMT =

American comic book series

- Cover to MIND MGMT #1, art by Matt Kindt

Publication information
- Publisher: Dark Horse Comics
- Schedule: Monthly
- Genre: Spy
- Publication date: May 2012 – August 2015
- No. of issues: 36
- Main character(s): Meru, Henry Lyme

Creative team
- Written by: Matt Kindt
- Artist: Matt Kindt
- Editor: Brendan Wright

Collected editions
- The Manager (#0–6): ISBN 1595827978
- The Futurist (#7–12): ISBN 1616551984
- The Homemaker (#13–18): ISBN 1616553901
- The Magician (#19–24): ISBN 161655391X
- The Eraser (#25–30): ISBN 161655696X
- The Immortals (#31–36): ISBN 1616557982

MIND MGMT is an American comic book series created by Matt Kindt and published through Dark Horse Comics. The first issue was released on May 23, 2012, to positive reviews and received a second printing in April 2013. The series continued to receive positive coverage during its run, but Kindt's art style was a common point of criticism. The series concluded with issue 36 in August 2015. The story has been collected into six hardcover and three omnibuses.

The story is about Meru, a true crime writer who searches for the truth behind a mysterious airline flight and discovers a secret government agency of super spies, espionage, and psychic abilities. Henry Lyme, the former top agent, has gone rogue and is working to dismantle the organization.

The film rights were optioned by 20th Century Fox in December 2012. Producer Ridley Scott and screenwriter David J. Kelly began pre-production in January 2013. A television adaptation was announced in 2017.

== Publication history ==
=== Development ===
The idea for MIND MGMT came from the title, which one of Kindt's friends gave to him. He worked on the concept for over a year, and the plot was outlined in a twelve-page synopsis.

After partnering for one of Kindt's previous works, 3 Story: The Secret History of the Giant Man, Dark Horse Publisher Mike Richardson asked Kindt to pitch another book. Kindt sent the proposal for MIND MGMT and was happy when it was accepted because Dark Horse was "the only publisher able to pay me a living wage and also let me do exactly what I wanted no matter what." The series was initially approved for over 50 issues, but Kindt pruned away excess material and reduced the run to 36 issues. Despite the reduction in length, the final product is still almost identical to the original pitch. Diana Schutz, editor of 3 Story, was originally slated to work with Kindt again, but the project was handed to newly promoted editor Brendan Wright very early in production. Kindt described their input as "invaluable" and considers Wright to be a collaborator.

Although Dark Horse had approved 36 issues, there was still a chance the book could sell poorly and receive an early cancellation. The decision would be made after receiving the final sales number for the third issue, meaning Kindt was only guaranteed six issues. Not wanting to risk the series being cut off in the middle of a story, he designed the first six issues to stand alone if necessary. Kindt pencilled two endings for the last page of issue six so he would be prepared either way.

Kindt took on additional comic scripting work while making MIND MGMT, but MIND MGMT was always his top priority. He scripted six issues at a time, then worked on the art during the hours his daughter was at school. At any given time, he would have one issue completed and ready to print.

Kindt said naming characters was the hardest part during the story's creation. Meru Marlow, the main character, is named after a Webster University student who attended a class taught by Kindt. Henry Lyme, another main character, is a reference to "Harry Lime" from the Orson Welles film "The Third Man" and is visually based on Zach Galifianakis in "The Hangover". Other supporting cast get their names from a mix of real people, film references, and even everyday objects, like Perrier mineral water.

MIND MGMT was Kindt's first solo monthly series. After creating several original graphic novels, Kindt felt the format was becoming too "easy" from a creative standpoint. He wanted to create a monthly series partly out of nostalgia, and to create a dialogue between readers and himself during publication. As an incentive to draw in readers who would otherwise wait for the collected edition, each issue included material which was not reprinted in the collected editions. Kindt stated he enjoyed the experience and the increased interaction with fans, even to the point of saying he may never do another graphic novel.

=== Publication ===
A six-page preview of the first issue was included with 3 Story: Secret files of the Giant Man, a one-issue continuation of another work by Kindt, in April 2012. The same month, three short stories were released online for free to promote the series. They were later printed as issue #0 in November 2012.

The first issue was published May 23, 2012, and the series ran monthly through November 2012. In December, a short chapter appeared in Dark Horse Presents vol 2 #19 as a prologue to the second story arc. The series returned to a monthly schedule in January 2013. The first issue was reprinted at a discount price in April 2013. Additional short chapters appeared in Dark Horse Presents vol 2 #31 (December 2013) and Dark Horse Presents vol 3 #7 (February 2015) and acted as introductions to the fourth and sixth arcs respectively. A one-page bonus strip written by Alex di Campi and drawn by Kindt was included in the third issue of Archie vs. Predator, published jointly by Dark Horse and Archie Comics in June 2015. The final issue (#36), also known as NEW MGMT #1, was published on August 26, 2015.

A 200-page hardcover collecting issues #0–6, collectively titled "The Manager," was released April 3, 2013. It was followed by "The Futurist" (collecting issues 7–12, Dark Horse Presents #19 short, and five strips originally published as webcomics on i09), "The Homemaker" (collecting issues 13–18), "The Magician" (collecting issues 19–24 and the Dark Horse Presents vol 2 #31 short), "The Eraser" (collecting issues 25–30) and "The Immortals" (collecting issues 31–36, and the Dark Horse Presents vol 3 #5 short).

In 2013, Kindt mentioned the possibility of MIND MGMT annuals or additional mini-series exploring the history of the series. In 2018, he crowdfunded a read-along comic and vinyl record with voice actor Clint McElroy through Kickstarter.

In 2018, the 36 issues of Mind Management were collected into three volume softcover "Omnibus" edition for publication in 2019. The first volume, published February 21, gathered the issues #0-#12 along with reprinting content from the individual issues that was not published in the hardcover graphic novels.

A new four issue miniseries, MIND MGMT: Bootleg, was released between July and October 2022. Each issue was drawn by a different artist, including Farel Dalrymple (#1), Matt Lesniewski (#2), David Rubin (#3), and Jill Thompson (#4).

== Plot ==
=== The Manager ===
MIND MGMT is a government agency of spies, formed during or after World War I, who have psychic abilities. Henry Lyme is recruited as a child, and becomes their greatest agent. The work exhausts him, and Lyme is retired to Zanzibar. While there, he has a breakdown and loses control of his abilities, causing the city's inhabitants to murder one another. Lyme decides MIND MGMT is too dangerous to exist, and flees. In an effort to cover his escape, he accidentally causes everyone aboard a plane with him to develop amnesia.

Meru, a true–crime writer, investigates the amnesia flight two years later. She finds a lead in Mexico, where she meets a CIA agent named Bill. They are attacked by two former MIND MGMT agents, but escape. Meru eventually locates Lyme, who tells her his story. Meru learns she was a child in Zanzibar during the massacre and was saved by Lyme. He erased her memory of the event and arranged a foster family for her. During her investigative career she has located Lyme several times, but he continuously causes her to forget. She leaves determined to expose the truth about MIND MGMT, but falls asleep instead. Waking in her apartment, she decides to uncover the truth behind the amnesia flight.

=== The Futurist ===
When former MIND MGMT agent The Eraser tries to reform the agency, she tries to have Meru assassinated. Lyme recruits Meru and fellow former agents Perrier and Dusty to stop the Eraser. At Perrier's insistence, they also team with Duncan "The Futurist" Jones, an agent who can see his own future. Duncan is aware of Lyme's manipulation of Meru, and insists he will not go along if Lyme continues to lie to her. Lyme agrees, but does not confess the truth to Meru. Believing the best way to stop the Eraser is to prevent her from contacting other former agents, the quintet travel to the MIND MGMT headquarters, Shangri-la, for a master list of all MIND MGMT personnel. There, Meru finds a library which contains the history of the world and reads the book containing her life. Meanwhile, three of the Eraser's allies engage Lyme and the others. Now aware of how Lyme has manipulated her, Meru helps stop the Eraser's crew but chooses not to remain with Lyme. She instead leaves with Bill, the CIA agent who is revealed to have been a MIND MGMT sleeper agent with whom she was previously romantically involved.

=== The Homemaker ===
After the events at Shangri-la, all parties know the present whereabouts of the sleeper agent Megan, code named "The Homemaker." However, they are unaware she was originally a mole for the Russian MIND MGMT counterpart known as Zero. When Lyme and Duncan try to activate her, they also awaken her Zero training and Megan begins to orchestrate the self-destruction of her subdivision through subterfuge. As the groups prepare to recruit Megan for their various agendas, Lyme, Eraser, and Meru reflect on how they arrived at their present position. Lyme regrets his multiple manipulations of Meru, and is currently on a mission of atonement. Meru is still adjusting to her recently awakened memories of her own training as a MIND MGMT agent. The Eraser dreams of her dead husband, a former MIND MGMT agent, and the night she was framed for his murder. As the Homemaker's plan climaxes in a massacre, Eraser, Lyme, and Meru all arrive at the same time. Megan joins the Eraser in order to take revenge on MIND MGMT for leaving her in her undercover status after the agency was dismantled. Meru and Bill reunite with Lyme, Duncan, Perrier, and Dusty. While she is unable to forgive Lyme's previous actions, Meru decides he is the lesser evil in the present situation.

=== The Magician ===
Meru, Lyme, and their allies travel to Germany to find the Magician, another former agent. They arrive during one of the Magician's acts and Meru unintentionally negates her abilities, ruining the performance. This angers the Magician, who decides to ally herself with the Eraser out of spite. The Eraser's recruits use the Magician's help to set a trap for Lyme, Duncan, and Perrier. Lyme is beaten into a coma and left for dead, although he is found by passersby and taken to a hospital. Duncan and Perrier escape, but are now disconnected from Meru and the others. Meanwhile, Meru, Bill, and Dusty follow up a different lead in Hong Kong. They too are attacked by the Eraser, resulting in Dusty and Bill's deaths. Meru escapes, and is now more resolved than ever to stop the Eraser.

== Critical reception ==
The series debuted with positive reviews, and the first issue sold 7535 copies in May 2012, making it the 236th best selling issue by units for the month. Reorders caused the first two issues to sell out at the distribution level. Reviewing for Comic Book Resources, Kelly Thompson gave the first issue 4.5 stars out of 5, and described the quality as "simply sublime".

Kindt's art style is a common area of criticism for the book. Writing for iFanboy, Paul Montgomery said "Kindt's aesthetic won't win over every reader, [but] his watercolors lend perfectly to the story's themes and tone". Reviewer Colin Smith initially felt the art was a weak point the good story could not overcome, but changed his mind after subsequent issues. Later issues continued to receive praise; however, sales for later issues fell until bottoming out with 4706 orders for issue seven. Sales then began to increase, with 5842 orders for issue ten. The final issue had estimated sales slightly over 6,000.

When the first hardcover collection was released, it was on the New York Times bestseller list for two weeks. Seth Peagler of the HeroesOnline blog praised the first storyline, describing the series as "one of the most underappreciated, innovative monthly comics on the stands today". In January 2014, the Young Adult Library Services Association included the first hardcover of MIND MGMT on their top ten list of great graphic novels from 2013. The following month, it was at the top of the New York Times list of comic books that should be adapted to television.

The series appeared on numerous comic media "Best of" lists in 2012, 2013, and 2014.

== Collected editions ==
| Title | Material collected | Published date | ISBN |
|---|---|---|---|
| MIND MGMT Vol. 1: The Manager | MIND MGMT #0-6 | April 2013 | 978-1595827975 |
| MIND MGMT Vol. 2: The Futurist | MIND MGMT #7-12 and material from Dark Horse Presents (vol. 2) #19 and io9.com | October 2013 | 978-1616551988 |
| MIND MGMT Vol. 3: The Homemaker | MIND MGMT #13-18 | June 2014 | 978-1616553906 |
| MIND MGMT Vol. 4: The Magician | MIND MGMT #19-24 and material from Dark Horse Presents (vol. 2) #31 | December 2014 | 978-1616553913 |
| MIND MGMT Vol. 5: The Eraser | MIND MGMT #25-30 | August 2015 | 978-1616556969 |
| MIND MGMT Vol. 6: The Immortals | MIND MGMT #31-36 and material from Dark Horse Presents (vol. 3) #7 | February 2016 | 978-1616557980 |
| MIND MGMT Omnibus Part 1: The Manager and the Futurist | MIND MGMT #0-12 and material from Dark Horse Presents (vol. 2) #19 and io9.com | April 2019 | 978-1506704609 |
| MIND MGMT Omnibus Part 2: The Home Maker and the Magician | MIND MGMT #13-24 and material from Dark Horse Presents (vol. 2) #31 | June 2019 | 978-1506704616 |
| MIND MGMT Omnibus Part 3: The Eraser and the Immortals | MIND MGMT #25-36 and material from Dark Horse Presents (vol. 3) #7 | October 2019 | 978-1506704623 |
| MIND MGMT: Bootleg | MIND MGMT: Bootleg #1-4 | February 2023 | 978-1506716558 |

== In other media ==
=== Film ===
Talks with 20th Century Fox for a film adaptation began in December 2012, and the project was optioned for one year in early 2013. In late January 2013, Ridley Scott was announced as producer for the film with Mike Richardson and Keith Goldberg. Kindt acted as a consultant for the film and shared the complete outline for the story with Scott and David J. Kelly, the screenwriter. He believed Scott had "a good take on it" and did not mind if it was not a faithful adaption. The option was renewed twice to give the screenwriter more time to work. By July 2017, the rights had moved to Universal Cable Productions, who was developing MIND MGMT as a TV series with Daniel Cerone as the showrunner. In 2022, plans for a film had resumed with Curtis Gwinn as executive producer.

=== Board game ===
In March 2020, a Kickstarter was launched for the board game MIND MGMT: The Psychic Espionage "Game." The game is a hidden movement game designed by Jay Cormier and Sen-Foong Lim, published by Off the Page Games with art by Kindt. In the game, one player (the recruiter) hides from the other players (the rogue agents) while attempting to gain recruits by visiting various features around the board.

The game became the first board game to be nominated for a Harvey Award in "Best Adaptation from a Comic Book/Graphic Novel" category. IGN stated that the game did well in "streamlining and enriching the hidden movement genre."
