= Roy Raymond (character) =

Publication information
- Publisher: DC Comics
- First appearance: Detective Comics #153 (Nov. 1949)
- Created by: Ruben Moreira (artwork)

In-story information
- Abilities: Brilliant analytical mind

Roy Raymond is a fictional character that appears in American comic books published by DC Comics. He was introduced in "Impossible... But True!", a back-up strip in Detective Comics, beginning with issue #153 (Nov. 1949).

In 1997, Roy Raymond Jr. was introduced as the grandson of the original Roy Raymond. He was later renamed Roy Raymond III during "DC Rebirth".

== Fictional character biography ==
=== Roy Raymond Sr. ===
Roy Raymond is the host of a television show called Impossible... But True!, which bears a strong resemblance to Ripley's Believe It Or Not. The stories involve Raymond and his assistant, Karen Duncan, investigating claims and exposing hoaxes, ensuring all the stories on the show are true. In the first adventure, Roy investigated a village in the Amazon Jungle where it's rumored that travelers suddenly grow old.

The strip was later retitled "Roy Raymond: TV Detective".

In the Silver Age, Aquaman took over the back-up slot in Detective Comics.

Raymond subsequently appeared in the Superman titles, where it was revealed he had been kidnapped by a supervillain and brainwashed into committing crimes. After being rescued by Superman, he resumed his television career at Metropolis' Galaxy Broadcasting, which at the time was also the employer of Clark Kent.

Roy Raymond also appeared during Rick Veitch's tenure on Swamp Thing (issues #67-68, 74, 81, and Annual #3 [1988]). He is portrayed as an avaricious media figure; surgery has made him appear much younger, and he wants to use Swamp Thing to further his career. He and his assistant Lipschitz, are trapped for days in a limo being driven by a monstrous and insane failed earth elemental called "The Wild Thing". He spends the latter part of the ordeal, before being discovered by cops, hallucinating a business deal with Morgan Edge, the head of the broadcasting company WGBS. Roy's hallucinatory conversation is over the concept of Swamp Thing.

Lipschitz died after having spent his last hours face down in filth at the bottom of the limo, injured and unable to move, pleading with Raymond to summon help. Raymond also ended up with severe facial damage, his plastic surgery having come undone during the trip. Raymond rebounds with a repaired and older face, recommitted to being an honest investigative reporter who will reveal society's corruptions.

In 2016, DC Comics implemented another relaunch of its books called "DC Rebirth" which restored its continuity to a form much as it was prior to "The New 52". Roy Raymond's history remains intact where he served as the inspiration for Batman's detective skills.

=== Roy Raymond Jr. ===
Robin #38 (March 1997) introduced Roy Raymond Jr., the grandson of the original, who presented a tabloid television series in Gotham City called Roy Raymond: Manstalker.

There is mention of Raymond in Detective Comics #818 where Batman describes Raymond as one of the few detectives he admires, but who "chooses to waste his talents on daytime television" and so is apparently still hosting his TV show.

In Superman #669, a flashback shows that Raymond did indeed have a show under WGBS years ago, during Superman's early years. It was advertised on a billboard Superman was passing.

Raymond Jr., appeared in The Flash, working for a news station in Keystone City that was launching a smear campaign against the Flash (based on an ill-thought remark by West, Raymond gives the hero the "Most Awful Human in the Universe" award). Unknown to him, his boss was the malformed supervillain Spin, who uses media manipulation to control reality.

Following the death of Bruce Wayne, Alfred Pennyworth approached Raymond in Outsiders Special #1 (Feb. 2009) to join the Outsiders. He accepted the offer and became Owlman, with equipment left for that purpose by Batman.

As seen in the first issue of Blackest Night, Raymond has written a book on the murder of Sue Dibny.

In 2016, DC Comics implemented another relaunch of its books called "DC Rebirth" which restored its continuity to a form much as it was prior to "The New 52". Roy Raymond III is the grandson of Roy Raymond and is the current host of Impossible... But True!

== Powers and abilities ==
Roy Raymond is an expert investigator. He formerly possessed psychokinesis and telepathy.

Roy Raymond Jr. is an expert at hand-to-hand combat.

=== Equipment ===
As Owlman, Roy Raymond Jr. uses owl-based equipment where his Owlman suit contains night vision lenses, retractable talons, and enables him some form of flight thanks to a combination of his rocket boots and his cape that can assume a glider form.

== Other versions ==
=== Tangent Comics ===
Roy Raymond appeared in the 1997 Tangent Comics one shot Green Lantern alongside the Tangent version of King Faraday in a story revolving around King Faraday's final mystery and the death of Ralph Digby. Raymond is the current owner of "The House Of Mystery" as he purchased the company's stock after the murder of Digby, who in turn had recently purchased the company from Alfred Pennyworth.

=== DC: The New Frontier ===
Raymond appeared in Darwyn Cooke's 2004 DC: The New Frontier as a Hollywood celebrity who bravely refused to comply with McCarthy's Congressional Committee on Un-American Activities investigation into supposed communists in the entertainment and superhero worlds. He was blacklisted as a communist sympathizer for refusing to name communist celebrities or his own political position, thus presumably losing his TV and radio shows as well as his newspaper column.
