= Matt Kindt =

American comic book writer, cartoonist, and graphic designer

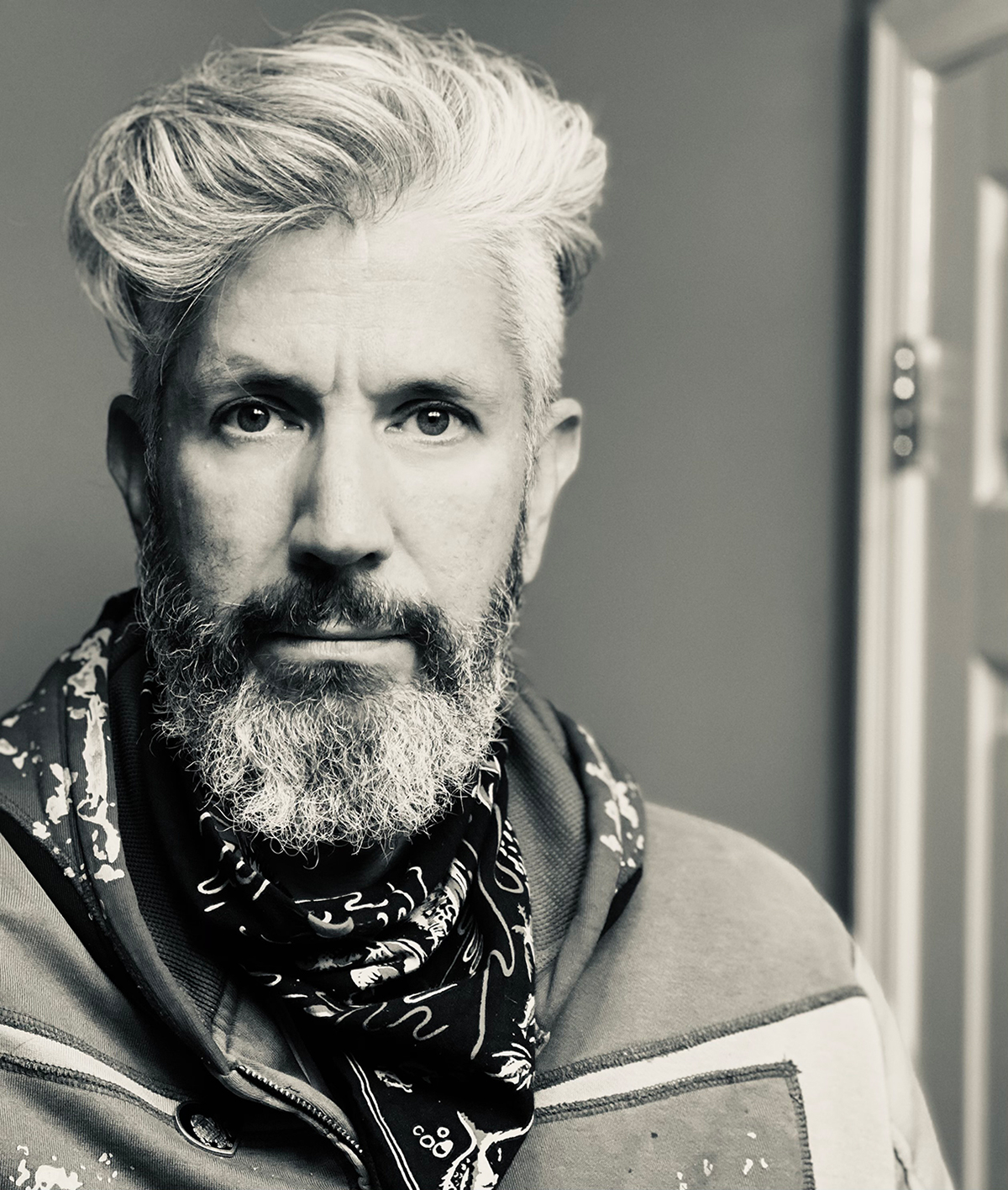
- Kindt in October 2020
- Born: 1973 (age 52–53)
- Areas: Writer, Penciller, Inker, Colourist
- Notable works: MIND MGMT, BRZRKR

Matt Kindt (born April 11, 1973) is an American comic book writer, cartoonist, and graphic designer. His early creator-owned works were spy fiction, and their success led to mainstream work for hire projects in superhero fiction and other genres. His work has been nominated for Eisner Awards and Harvey Awards. In the comic industry, he is best known for his work on MIND MGMT, the Valiant Entertainment superhero universe, and BRZRKR, the first issue of which is the highest-selling single comic issue of the 21st century.

== Early life ==
Kindt was born in 1973 in Cheektowaga, New York and currently resides in Webster Groves, Missouri. He worked in the local mini-comics scene from a young age, self-publishing his own copyshop zines since 1990. In 1995 he obtained a degree in art from Webster University in St. Louis.

== Career ==
Kindt has stated that he creates comic books because he enjoys the "magical" effect created by the combination of words and pictures. His target audience for his books are his wife and daughter, who did not grow up enjoying comics as he did.

In 2001, Top Shelf Productions published Pistolwhip, which Kindt created with Jason Hall. The book was critically well-received, nominated for the prestigious Harvey Award the next year, and featured in Time Magazine's Top 10 list for Graphic Novels. He has illustrated two Pistolwhip spin-offs (Mephisto and the Empty Box and Pistolwhip 2) and written his own, 300-page graphic novel, Two Sisters, as well as maintaining a regular webcomic set in the Sisters universe, called Super Spy. In 2006, Kindt announced on his blog that he would be writing an experimental novel called The End of the World. The book has been completed, but Kindt now plans to adapt it into a graphic novel. In 2007, the collected Super Spy was published by Top Shelf. 2008 saw the collected Super Spy nominated for the Eisner Award for Best Graphic Novel: Reprint. In March 2010, a Super Spy short story appeared on Dark Horse's Dark Horse Presents MySpace web comic. Kindt released Revolver in 2010, published by DC Comics' Vertigo imprint. His ongoing series MIND MGMT, Pastaways, and Dept. H were released by Dark Horse Comics.

He published 5-issue fantasy series Folklords, illustrated by Matt Smith, in 2020.

In 2021, Kindt partnered with actor Keanu Reeves and artist Ron Garney to create BRZRKR through Boom! Studios. The book's release received wide media coverage and became the highest-ordered monthly comic book in the Direct Market since 1991.

== Awards ==
- 2002:

Nominated for "Best Graphic Album of Original Work" Harvey Award, for Pistolwhip
Nominated for "Best New Talent" Harvey Award

- 2005: Nominated for "Talent Deserving Wider Recognition" Eisner Award, for Pistolwhip and 2 Sisters
- 2007: Nominated for "Best Publication Design" Eisner Award, for Lost Girls
- 2008: Nominated for "Best Graphic Album: Reprint" Eisner Award, for Super Spy

== Bibliography ==
=== Top Shelf Productions ===
- Pistolwhip (with Jason Hall):
  - Pistolwhip (w/a, graphic novel, 128 pages, 2001, ISBN 1-8918-3023-6)
  - Mephisto and the Empty Box (a, one-shot, 2001)
  - Pistolwhip and the Yellow Menace (a, graphic novel, 144 pages, 2003, ISBN 1-8918-3035-X)
- Super Spy (w/a):
  - 2 Sisters (w/a, graphic novel, 336 pages, 2004, ISBN 1-8918-3058-9)
  - Super Spy (w/a, a collection of webcomics ran from 02/06 through 02/07, 336 pages, 2007, ISBN 1-8918-3058-9)
  - Super Spy: The Lost Dossiers (w/a, graphic novel, 88 pages, 2010, ISBN 1-6030-9043-6)

=== Dark Horse Comics ===
- Dark Horse Maverick: Happy Endings: "January" (a, with Jason Hall, anthology graphic novel, 96 pages, 2002, ISBN 1-5697-1820-2)
- Michael Chabon Presents: The Amazing Adventures of the Escapist #4: "Chain Reaction" (w/a, 2004) collected in Michael Chabon Presents the Amazing Adventures of the Escapist Volume 2 (tpb, 160 pages, 2004, ISBN 1-5930-7172-8)
- 3 Story: The Secret History of the Giant Man (hc, 192 pages, 2009, ISBN 1-5958-2356-5)
- MySpace Dark Horse Presents #24–25, 32 (w/a, 2009) collected as 3 Story: Secret Files of the Giant Man
- Reset #1 (cover only, 2012)
- MIND MGMT #0–35 (w/a, 2012–2015)
  - NEW MGMT #1 (2015)
- Pastaways #1–9 (with artist Scott Kolins, 2015-2016)
- "Poppy! and the Lost Lagoon" (with artist Brian Hurtt, 2016)
- Ether #1–5 (with artist David Rubin, 2016-2017)
- Dept. H #1–24 (w/a, coloring by Sharlene Kindt, 2016-2018)
- Ether: The Copper Golems #1–5 (with artist David Rubin, 2018)
- "BANG!", 2020
- Crimson Flower #1-4 (with artist Matt Lesniewski, 2021)
- Fear Case #1-4 (with artist Tyler Jenkins, 2021)
- John le Carré's The Circus: Losing Control #1-3 (with artist Ibrahim Moustafa, 2025)

=== DC Comics/Vertigo ===
- Revolver (w/a, graphic novel, 192 pages, 2010, ISBN 1-4012-2241-2)
- Sweet Tooth (a, with Jeff Lemire):
  - "Prelude: Lost Trails" (with Nate Powell and Emi Lenox, in #19, 2011) collected in Endangered Species (tpb, 176 pages, 2012, ISBN 1-4012-3361-9)
  - "The Taxidermist" (in #26–28, 2011–2012) collected in Unnatural Habits (tpb, 160 pages, 2012, ISBN 1-4012-3723-1)
- JSA 80-Page Giant '11: "City of Light & Magic" (w, with Victor Ibáñez, 2011)
- My Greatest Adventure #1–6: "Uncanny Valley" (with Scott Kolins, 2011–2012)
- Men of War (w):
  - Men of War: Uneasy Company (tpb, 256 pages, 2012, ISBN 1-4012-3499-2) includes:
    - "Knife Fight!" (with Patrick Scherberger, in #5, 2012)
    - "Monster in My Pocket" (with Jeff Lemire and Thomas Derenick, in #8, 2012)
- Frankenstein, Agent of S.H.A.D.E. #0, 10–16 (w, with Alberto Ponticelli, June 2012 – January 2013)
- Suicide Squad vol 4, #24–30 (October 2013 – March 2014)

=== Valiant Entertainment ===
- Unity #0–25 (w, 2013–2015)
  - Unity (Volume 1): To Kill A King (tpb, collects #1–4, 128 pages, 2014, ISBN 1-93934-688-6)
  - Unity (Volume 2): Trapped By Webnet (tpb, collects #5–8 + X-O Manowar #5, 112 pages, 2014, ISBN 1-93934-634-7)
  - Unity (Volume 3): Armor Hunters (tpb, collects #8–11, 112 pages, 2014, ISBN 1-93934-644-4)
  - Unity (Volume 4): The United (tpb, collects #12–14 + #0 + Harbinger: Faith #0, 128 pages, 2015, ISBN 1-93934-654-1)
  - Unity (Volume 5): Homefront (tpb, collects #15–18, 112 pages, 2015, ISBN 1-93934-679-7)
  - Unity (Volume 6): The War-Monger (tpb, collects #19–22, 112 pages, 2015, ISBN 1-93934-690-8)
  - Unity (Volume 7): Revenge of the Armor Hunters (tpb, collects #23–25, 112 pages, 2016, ISBN 1-68215-113-1)
  - Unity Deluxe Edition 1 (hc, collects #0–14, 400 pages, 2015, ISBN 1-93934-657-6)
- Rai (w, 2014-ongoing)
  - Rai (Volume 1): Welcome to New Japan (tpb, collects #1–4, 112 pages, 2014, ISBN 1-93934-641-X)
  - Rai (Volume 2): Battle For New Japan (tpb, collects #5–8, 112 pages, 2015, ISBN 1-93934-661-4)
  - Rai (Volume 3): The Orphan (tpb, collects #9–12, 112 pages, 2016, ISBN 1-93934-684-3)
  - Rai Deluxe Edition 1 (hc, collects #1–12, 352 pages, 2016, ISBN 1-68215-117-4)
- The Valiant #1–4 (co-written with Jeff Lemire, 2015)
  - The Valiant (tpb, 112 pages, 2015, ISBN 1-93934-660-6)
  - The Valiant Deluxe Edition (hc, 160 pages, 2015, ISBN 1-93934-691-6)
- Divinity (w):
  - Divinity #1–4 (2015)
    - Divinity (Volume 1) (tpb, 112 pages, 2015, ISBN 1-93934-676-2)
  - Divinity II #1–4 (2016)
  - Divinity III: Stalinverse #1–4 (2016)
- Ninjak (w, 2015-ongoing)
  - Ninjak (Volume 1): Weaponeer (tpb, collects #1–5, 176 pages, 2015, ISBN 1-93934-666-5)
  - Ninjak (Volume 2): The Shadow Wars (tpb, collects #6–9, 144 pages, 2016, ISBN 1-93934-694-0)
- Book of Death: Fall of Ninjak #1 (w, one-shot, 2015)
- 4001 A.D. #1–4 (w, 2016)
- X-O Manowar #1-26 (2017-2019)

=== BOOM! Studios ===
- Grass Kings (with artist Tyler Jenkins, 2017)
- Black Badge (with artist Tyler Jenkins, 2018)
- "Folklords" (with artist Matt Smith, 2020)
- BRZRKR (with co-writer Keanu Reeves and artist Ron Garney, 2021)

=== Bad Idea ===
- "Hero Trade: Hero for Sale", one-shot (with artist David Lapham, 2020) - ashcan released under the publishing pseudonym Buttoned Up Comics
- ENIAC #1-4 (with artist Doug Braithwaite, 2021)
- Whalesville x Rocks and Minerals, one-shot, (with artists Adam Pollina and Tony Millionaire, 2021)
- Hero Trade: Passive/Aggressive - (with artist David Lapham, 2021)
- Refuse x Last Resort, one-shot, (with artist Marguerite Sauvage, 2021)

=== Other publishers ===
- SPX '02: "Jocko Flocko" (w/a, CBLDF, 2002)
- Postcards: "The History of a Marriage" (a, with Harvey Pekar and Joyce Brabner, graphic novel, 160 pages, Villard Books, 2007, ISBN 0-3454-9850-X)
- The Tick's 20th Anniversary Special Edition: "World War Spoon" (w/a, New England, 2007)
- Awesome: The Indie Spinner Rack Anthology: "The Misery Index" (w/a, graphic novel, 208 pages, Evil Twin, 2007, ISBN 1-6030-9039-8)
- Strange Tales #2: "Black Widow" (w/a, Marvel, 2009) collected in ST (hc, 192 pages, 2010, ISBN 0-7851-4626-1; tpb, 2010, ISBN 0-7851-2802-6)
- Wolverine and the X-Men #27.AU (w, Marvel Comics, 2013)
- Marvel Knights Spider-Man #1–5 (w, Marvel, 2014)
- Madman: All-New Giant-Size Super Ginchy Special!: "On the Road" (w/a, one-shot, Image, 2011)
- The Tooth (with Cullen Bunn and Shawn Lee), graphic novel, 200 pages, Oni Press, 2011, ISBN 1-9349-6452-2
- Red Handed: The Fine Art of Strange Crimes, First Second, 2013
