= Marvel Masterworks =

Hardcover anthology comic book collection

Marvel Masterworks is an American collection of hardcover and trade paperback comic book reprints published by Marvel Comics, with the main goal of republishing classic Marvel Comics storylines in a hardcover, premium edition, often with restored artwork and better graphical quality when compared to other Marvel collected editions. The collection started in 1987, with volumes reprinting the issues of The Amazing Spider-Man, The Fantastic Four, The X-Men, and The Avengers. The Masterworks line has expanded from such reprints of the 1960s period that fans and historians call the Silver Age of Comic Books to include the 1930s–1940s Golden Age; comics of Marvel's 1950s pre-Code forerunner, Atlas Comics; and even some reprints from the 1970s period called the Bronze Age of Comic Books. In 2023, Fantagraphics began releasing hardcover collections of Atlas and Marvel Comics that Marvel had neglected to issue themselves. Marvel announced that the series would be going on hiatus after volume 389, effectively cancelling the next volume, which was to be The Defenders vol. 10. At San Diego Comic-Con 2026, it was announced that Clover Press was going to bring back the Marvel Masterworks line through a crowdfunding campaign, keeping legacy numbering and providing classic cover options.

DC Comics launched DC Archive Editions in 1989, their equivalent of the Marvel Masterworks line.

== History ==
=== First series (1987–1993) ===
The first printing of Masterworks books from Marvel started in 1987 (three in 1987, four per year after that) and continued until 1994 (27 volumes), most with a suggested retail price of US$29.95 (Hulk $24.95) for the first three years, $34.95 after that (Silver Surfer Vol. 19 $44.95). The first printings had a marble-look dust jacket with either light gray, pastels or primary colors; the binding was a faux leather dyed in the color associated with the title (Marvel Masterworks, volume number, and title was embossed usually in gold (exceptions: The Silver Surfer, Iron Man) on the spine along with an embossed symbol representing the character(s) of the title on the front) and numbered in the order the volumes were released (e.g., The Amazing Spider-Man Vol. 1 was #1, The Fantastic Four Vol. 1 was #2). Volumes contained about 10 issues (plus one Annual) and were about 220-260 pages each. Some volumes had fewer pages, such as The Invincible Iron Man Vol. 1 (197 pages), The Incredible Hulk Vol. 1 (150 pages), and The Uncanny X-Men Vol. 1-3 (each under 200 pages). The end papers featured a "gallery" of three sequential Masterworks covers, along with a partial cover of the next volume in the series (except Volumes 1, 2 and 27). The volume in which the "gallery" was printed would always "hang" in the third position, preceded by the previous two volumes. Some volumes have had multiple printings, such as The Amazing Spider-Man Vol. 1, with seven.

=== Trade paperbacks (1992–1993) ===
Also during the original Marvel Masterworks run between 1992 and 1993, Marvel Comics had published lower-priced trade paperback editions of selected volumes in the Masterworks line, but these versions only reprinted half of the contents compared to the hardcover editions. These were:

- The Amazing Spider-Man Masterworks Vol. 1 (March 1992) - reprints Amazing Fantasy #15, The Amazing Spider-Man #1-5 (ISBN 0-87135-902-2)
- The Avengers Masterworks Vol. 1 (October 1993) - reprints The Avengers #1-5 (ISBN 0-87135-983-9)
- The Uncanny X-Men Masterworks Vol. 1 (March 1993) - reprints The Uncanny X-Men #1-5 (ISBN 0-87135-964-2)
- The All-New, All Different X-Men Masterworks Vol. 1 (August 1993) - reprints Giant-Size X-Men #1, The Uncanny X-Men #94-97 (ISBN 0-87135-988-X)

Even though on the cover each book was labeled as Volume 1, no subsequent volumes were ever published for these trade paperbacks. Marvel did not try trade paperback versions of the Masterworks again until 2002 and 2009.

=== Second series (1997–2002) ===
From 1994 to 1996, no new Masterworks were published, and existing volumes did not get additional printings. Following this, from 1997 to 2002, the Masterworks line was revived, when some of the original 27 went back into print with a new style of dust jacket designed by Comicraft, and without the chronological numbering on the spine. Instead, the line used the number of the volume for each particular comic book series. Four new Masterworks were published from 2000 to 2002, bringing the total then to 31. Only 10 volumes were published in total from this initial relaunch, and they were Marvel Masterworks: The Fantastic Four Vol. 1 and Vol. 6, Marvel Masterworks: Daredevil Vol. 1 and Vol. 2, Marvel Masterworks: The Mighty Thor Vol. 1 and Vol. 3, Marvel Masterworks: X-Men Vol. 1 and Vol. 3, Marvel Masterworks: The Amazing Spider-Man Vol. 1, and Marvel Masterworks: The Avengers Vol. 1. They are now out of print.

=== Relaunch (2003–2025) ===
With The Sub-Mariner Vol. 1, the 32nd Masterwork, Marvel relaunched the line with silver dust jackets in 2003. On the front cover dust jacket, these initial releases had the book's interior contents and creator names on the top of the front cover art image, and the Marvel Masterworks name under the cover art on the bottom, with the volume number on the spine featured in a black-filled square with silver edging, with a silver font labeling the volume number. Post-2003 afterward, Marvel redesigned the look: the Masterworks name with the title and volume number now up on top of the cover image, with the interior contents and creator names listed at the bottom of the cover art, and the dust jacket spine numbering filled in a silver square with black lettering font labeling the volume number. From 2002 to 2004, Marvel brought the 31 now-out-of-print volumes back into print, all with the new silver dust jackets. Like the other releases from 1997 on, these dust jackets do not have the chronological numbering. Upon their initial release, however, a limited print run (about 1,000 to 1,500) was produced with variant dust jackets that used the original marble-look style and retained the absolute chronological numbering (only on the dust jacket's spine). These carried a $5 higher suggested retail price than the regular editions (typically US$54.99).

Some changes were made for the new second editions, with some issues/covers re-colored, previously unreprinted pin-up pages added, and some issues were moved between volumes (Annual issues were amongst the changes made, as Marvel wanted to do a more accurate chronological reprinting of their history than the Masterworks series had previously attained).

Starting with the 33rd volume, The Amazing Spider-Man Vol. 6 (April 2004), Marvel started producing new Masterworks once again, continuing monthly from August 2004. These new books have also been printed with both regular and variant/original cover styles.

As of June 2025, it was announced that Marvel Masterworks would be placed on indefinite hiatus which began in January 2026 as a result of declining sales.

=== Trade paperbacks (Barnes & Noble, 2002) ===
In 2002, Marvel partnered with Barnes & Noble to produce lower-priced trade paperback (typically US$12.95) versions of selected Masterworks volumes. Twelve were produced, without dust jackets, and they utilized the silver cover scheme (based on the initial 2002 dust jacket design prior to the 2003 revamping layout).

=== Trade paperbacks (2009–2015 editions) ===
In 2008 (and starting in 2009), Marvel moved their printing plant to China and reprint the Masterworks as a trade paperback line for the third time in celebration of the publisher's then-70th anniversary year, reprinting the Masterworks monthly in the same sequence as they were originally released in the hardcover editions. Like the post-2003 remastered hardcovers relaunch, this trade paperback line also had both regular and limited alternate variant covers that used the original 1987 marble-look style. This series of trade paperbacks reprinted in order of the original hardback releases from The Amazing Spider-Man Vol. 1 to Warlock Vol. 1. The Marvel Masterworks trade paperback series was discontinued in 2015 and somewhat replaced by the new Epic Collection trade paperback series, which began in 2014.

=== Golden Age Masterworks (2004–2012) ===
In October 2004, Marvel released its first Golden Age collection, Golden Age: Marvel Comics Vol. 1, launching a new line of Masterworks. This 1939 and 1940s line reprints material by Timely Comics, Marvel's Golden Age predecessor. It is differentiated from the 1960s Silver Age line by the words Golden Age on each title, and with the regular dust jacket colored gold rather than silver. From Golden Age: Captain America Vol. 1 (February 2005) onward, these volumes were released quarterly. The line was discontinued in 2012.

=== Atlas Era Masterworks (2006–2013) ===
In January 2006, with Atlas Era: Tales to Astonish Vol. 1, Marvel began publishing a third line of Masterworks, reprinting 1950s and early 1960s comics of Marvel forerunner company Atlas Comics. The regular editions of these volumes have red dust jackets instead of silver. The comics reprinted in these volumes were originally produced during a lull in superhero popularity. The initial Atlas Era Masterworks volumes were primarily science-fiction/fantasy stories, particularly featuring drive-in theater-style monsters. More recent volumes have included other genres, such as pre-Comics Code horror and jungle stories. Marvel started publishing the Atlas Era Masterworks volumes semi-annually, then quarterly before returning to semi-annual. The line was discontinued in 2013.

=== Mighty Marvel Masterworks trade paperbacks (2021–2025) ===
Beginning in June 2021, Marvel started releasing a new trade paperback line called Mighty Marvel Masterworks. Originally nicknamed as Junior Masterworks, they aim to reprint classic stories in an affordable price for young readers, as to capitalize on the growing popularity of super-hero media, so the trim size is smaller than the average comic book trade (6" by 9"), resembling a manga volume.

=== Atlas Comics Library (2023-present) ===
Ten years after the last Atlas Era Marvel Masterworks release, Fantagraphics began reprinting comics from Marvel's Atlas Era in hardcover in 2023. As of May 2025, they have released eight volumes of Atlas-era comics, plus three oversized volumes devoted to specific creators: Joe Maneely, Al Williamson, and Bill Everett.

=== Lost Marvels (2025-present) ===
Fantagraphics began a series called Lost Marvels in 2025 reprinting Marvel titles in hardcover that Marvel had as yet chosen not to. The first volume, Tower of Shadows, was released in April. Volume 2, Howard Chaykin Volume 1: Dominic Fortune, Monark Starstalker, Phantom Eagle is scheduled for August, and Volume 3, collecting Savage Tales volume 2, is scheduled for November.

== Alphabetical list of Marvel Masterworks ==
Golden Age (30)

- All-Winners Vol. 1–4
- Captain America Vol. 1–6
- Daring Mystery Vol. 1–2
- Human Torch Vol. 1–3
- Marvel Comics Vol. 1–7
- Mystic Comics Vol. 1
- Sub-Mariner Vol. 1–3
- U.S.A. Comics Vol. 1–2
- Young Allies Vol. 1–2

Atlas Era (28)

- Battlefield Vol. 1
- Black Knight/Yellow Claw Vol. 1
- Heroes:
  Marvel Boy/Human Torch/
  Captain America/Sub-Mariner Vol. 1–3
- Journey into Mystery Vol. 1–4
- Jungle Adventures:
  Lorna/Jungle Action/Jungle Tales Vol. 1–3
- Menace Vol. 1
- Strange Tales Vol. 1–6
- Tales of Suspense Vol. 1–4
- Tales to Astonish Vol. 1–4
- Venus Vol. 1

Atlas Comics Library (12)

- Adventures Into Terror Vol. 1
- Adventures Into Weird Worlds Vol. 1
- Complete Mystery
- Girl Comics
- In the Days of Rockets!:
  Space Squadron/Space Worlds; Speed Carter, Spaceman
- Police Action
- Shiver As You Read!:
  Amazing Detective Cases #11-14/
  Men’s Adventures #21-26
- Sports Action
- Spy Cases
- Snafu
- Venus Vol. 2
- War Comics Vol. 1

Marvel Age (324)

- The Amazing Spider-Man Vol. 1–27
- Ant-Man/Giant-Man Vol. 1–3
- The Avengers Vol. 1–25
- Avengers West Coast Vol. 1
- Black Panther Vol. 1–3
- Brother Voodoo Vol. 1
- Captain America Vol. 1–17
- Captain Marvel Vol. 1–6
- The Champions Vol. 1
- Daredevil Vol. 1–19
- Dazzler Vol. 1–4
- Deathlok Vol. 1
- The Defenders Vol. 1–9
- Doctor Strange Vol. 1–11
- The Fantastic Four Vol. 1–27
- Ghost Rider Vol. 1–7
- Howard the Duck Vol. 1–2
- The Human Torch Vol. 1–2
- The Incredible Hulk Vol. 1–19
- Inhumans Vol. 1–2
- The Invincible Iron Man Vol. 1–18
- Iron Fist Vol. 1–2
- Ka-Zar Vol. 1–4

Marvel Age (continued)

- Killraven Vol. 1
- Luke Cage Vol. 1–3
- Man-Thing Vol. 1–2
- Marvel Rarities Vol. 1:
  Doctor Droom/Tales of the Watcher/
  Doctor Doom/Starhawk (Mark Wilde)
- Marvel Team-Up Vol. 1–8
- Marvel Two-In-One Vol. 1–8
- Ms. Marvel Vol. 1–2
- Nick Fury, Agent of S.H.I.E.L.D. Vol. 1–3
- Not Brand Echh Vol. 1
- Omega the Unknown Vol. 1
- Rawhide Kid Vol. 1–2
- Savage She-Hulk Vol. 1–2
- Sgt. Fury and his Howling Commandos Vol. 1–4
- Silver Surfer Vol. 1–2
- Spectacular Spider-Man Vol. 1–8
- Spider-Woman Vol. 1–4
- The Mighty Thor Vol. 1–24
- The Sub-Mariner Vol. 1–8
- Tomb of Dracula Vol. 1–4
- Uncanny-X-Men Vol. 1–17
- The Vision and the Scarlet Witch Vol. 1
- Warlock Vol. 1–2
- Werewolf by Night Vol. 1–3
- The X-Men Vol. 1–8

Lost Marvels (3)

- Howard Chaykin Vol. 1: Dominic Fortune/
  Monark Starstalker/Phantom Eagle
- Savage Tales Vol. 2
- Tower of Shadows Vol. 1

== Table of Marvel Masterworks ==
This list is sorted by the order of first publication. Note that while the Uncanny X-Men, Defenders and Champions volumes are from the Bronze Age of Comic Books, they are listed as being Silver Age as per Marvel's categorization. When the variant and the regular cover volume are published on different dates, the regular edition date or scheduled publishing date is listed. When issues have been moved between volumes for later editions, the later edition placement is listed. The "B&N" category shows if a Barnes & Noble trade paperback is available (only 12 were published). The ISBN listed is that of the 2003 series [reboot] silver editions (not the variant/embossed foil editions).

#	Age/ era	Volume title	Material collected	First edition	Second edition	Pages	B&N	ISBN	TPBs (2009-15 editions)	Years covered	Introduction by
1	Silver	The Amazing Spider-Man Vol. 1	Amazing Fantasy #15 and The Amazing Spider-Man #1-10	Nov. 1987	9 July 2003	248	Yes	978-0-7851-1256-3	2009-02-04	1962-64	Stan Lee
2	Silver	The Fantastic Four Vol. 1	The Fantastic Four #1-10	Nov. 1987	June 2003	256	Yes	978-0-7851-1181-8	2009-03-11	1961-63	Stan Lee
3	Silver	The X-Men Vol. 1	The X-Men #1-10	Nov. 1987	June 2003	241	Yes	978-0-7851-0845-0	2009-04-08	1963-65	Stan Lee
4	Silver	The Avengers Vol. 1	The Avengers #1-10	Sept. 1988	1 Oct. 2003	216	Yes	978-0-7851-0883-2	2009-05-13	1963-64	Stan Lee
5	Silver	The Amazing Spider-Man Vol. 2	The Amazing Spider-Man #11-19 and Annual #1	Oct. 1988	27 Aug. 2003	288	Yes	978-0-7851-1264-8	2009-06-10	1964	Stan Lee
6	Silver	The Fantastic Four Vol. 2	The Fantastic Four #11-20 and Annual #1	Oct. 1988	30 July 2003	295	No	978-0-7851-0980-8	2009-07-08	1963	Stan Lee
7	Silver	The X-Men Vol. 2	The X-Men #11-21	Nov. 1988	9 July 2003	240	No	978-0-7851-0983-9	2009-08-12	1965-66	Stan Lee
8	Silver	The Incredible Hulk Vol. 1	The Incredible Hulk #1-6	Sept. 1989	7 May 2003	176	Yes	978-0-7851-1185-6	2009-09-09	1962-63	Stan Lee
9	Silver	The Avengers Vol. 2	The Avengers #11-20	Sept. 1989	3 Dec. 2003	224	No	978-0-7851-1178-8	2009-10-14	1964-65	Stan Lee
10	Silver	The Amazing Spider-Man Vol. 3	The Amazing Spider-Man #20-30 and Annual #2	Oct. 1989	15 Oct. 2003	272	Yes	978-0-7851-1188-7	2009-11-11	1965	Stan Lee
11	Bronze	The Uncanny X-Men Vol. 1	Giant-Size X-Men #1 and The X-Men #94-100	Nov. 1989	12 Nov. 2003	176	Yes	978-0-7851-1192-4	2009-12-09	1975-76	Chris Claremont
12	Bronze	The Uncanny X-Men Vol. 2	The X-Men #101-110	Aug. 1990	7 Jan. 2004	192	Yes	978-0-7851-1193-1	2010-01-06	1976-78	Stan Lee
13	Silver	The Fantastic Four Vol. 3	The Fantastic Four #21-30	Sept. 1990	24 Sept. 2003	234	No	978-0-7851-1182-5	2010-02-10	1963-64	Stan Lee
14	Silver	Captain America Vol. 1	The Captain America stories from Tales of Suspense #59-81	Oct. 1990	June 2003	272	No	978-0-7851-1176-4	2010-03-10	1964-66	Stan Lee
15	Silver	The Silver Surfer Vol. 1	The Silver Surfer stories from The Silver Surfer #1-6, and the Silver Surfer story from Fantastic Four Annual #5	June 1991	June 2003	260	Yes	978-0-7851-1187-0	2010-05-12	1968-69	Stan Lee
16	Silver	The Amazing Spider-Man Vol. 4	The Amazing Spider-Man #31-40	Aug. 1991	10 Dec. 2003	216	Yes	978-0-7851-1189-4	2010-06-09	1965-66	Stan Lee
17	Silver	Daredevil Vol. 1	Daredevil #1-11	Sept. 1991	10 Dec. 2003	256	Yes	978-0-7851-1257-0	2010-07-14	1964-65	Stan Lee
18	Silver	The Mighty Thor Vol. 1	The Thor stories and the Tales from Asgard stories from Journey into Mystery #83-100	Oct. 1991	16 July 2003	280	No	978-0-7851-1267-9	2010-08-11	1962-64	Stan Lee
19	Silver	The Silver Surfer Vol. 2	The Silver Surfer #7-18	Dec. 1991	20 Aug. 2003	272	No	978-0-7851-1177-1	2010-09-08	1969-70	Stan Lee
20	Silver	The Invincible Iron Man Vol. 1	The Iron Man stories from Tales of Suspense #39-50	Sept. 1992	5 Nov. 2003	197	No	978-0-7851-1186-3	2010-04-07	1963-64	Stan Lee
21	Silver	The Fantastic Four Vol. 4	The Fantastic Four #31-40 and Annual #2	Nov. 1992	26 Nov. 2003	264	No	978-0-7851-1183-2	2010-10-06	1964-65	Stan Lee
22	Silver	The Amazing Spider-Man Vol. 5	The Amazing Spider-Man #41-50 and Annual #3	Dec. 1992	18 Feb. 2004	240	No	978-0-7851-1190-0	2010-11-10	1966-67	Stan Lee
23	Silver	Doctor Strange Vol. 1	The Doctor Strange stories from Strange Tales #110-111 and 114–141	Dec. 1992	6 Aug. 2003	272	No	978-0-7851-1180-1	2010-12-08	1963-66	None in 2003 edition. Other editions: Dean Mullaney
24	Bronze	The Uncanny X-Men Vol. 3	The X-Men #111-121 (the first printing omitted #121)	Sept. 1993	March 2004	208	No	978-0-7851-1194-8	2011-01-12	1978-79	Stan Lee
25	Silver	The Fantastic Four Vol. 5	The Fantastic Four #41-50 and Annual #3	Oct. 1993	28 Jan. 2004	240	No	978-0-7851-1184-9	2011-02-09	1965-66	Stan Lee
26	Silver	The Mighty Thor Vol. 2	The Thor stories and the Tales from Asgard stories from Journey into Mystery #101-110	Jan. 1994	10 Sept. 2003	224	No	978-0-7851-1191-7	2011-03-09	1964	Stan Lee
27	Silver	The Avengers Vol. 3	The Avengers #21-30	Feb. 1994	4 Feb. 2004	216	No	978-0-7851-1179-5	2011-04-06	1965-66	Stan Lee
28	Silver	The Fantastic Four Vol. 6	The Fantastic Four #51-60 and Annual #4	25 Oct. 2000	March 2004	240	No	978-0-7851-1266-2	2011-05-11	1966-67	Stan Lee
29	Silver	Daredevil Vol. 2	Daredevil #12-21	17 Oct. 2001	25 Feb. 2004	224	No	978-0-7851-1265-5	2011-06-08	1966	Stan Lee
30	Silver	The Mighty Thor Vol. 3	Journey into Mystery #111-120 and Annual #1	14 Nov. 2001	19 Nov. 2003	256	No	978-0-7851-1268-6	2011-07-13	1964-65	None in 2003 edition. Other editions: Stan Lee
31	Silver	The X-Men Vol. 3	The X-Men #22-31	Jan. 2002	4 Sept. 2003	224	No	978-0-7851-1269-3	2011-08-10	1966-67	Roy Thomas
32	Silver	The Sub-Mariner Vol. 1	The Sub-Mariner stories from Tales to Astonish #70-87, The Iron Man story from Tales of Suspense #80	1 May 2002	14 Jan. 2003	224	No	978-0-7851-0875-7	2011-09-07	1965-67	Stan Lee
33	Silver	The Amazing Spider-Man Vol. 6	The Amazing Spider-Man #51-61 and Annual #4	April 2004	March 2009	304	No	978-0-7851-1362-1	2011-10-12	1967-68	John Romita Sr.
34	Silver	The Fantastic Four Vol. 7	The Fantastic Four #61-71 and Annual #5	25 Aug. 2004	N/A	304	No	978-0-7851-1584-7	2011-11-09	1967-68	Joe Sinnott
35	Silver	The X-Men Vol. 4	The X-Men #32-42	22 Sept. 2004	April 2009	240	No	978-0-7851-1607-3	2011-12-07	1967-68	Roy Thomas
36	Golden	Golden Age: Marvel Comics Vol. 1	Marvel Comics #1 and Marvel Mystery Comics #2-4	20 Oct. 2004	N/A	272	No	978-0-7851-1609-7	2012-01-11	1939-40	Roy Thomas
37	Bronze	The Uncanny X-Men Vol. 4	The X-Men #122-131 and Annual #3	27 Oct. 2004	May 2009	224	No	978-0-7851-1630-1	2012-02-08	1979-80	Chris Claremont
38	Silver	The Avengers Vol. 4	The Avengers #31-40	10 Nov. 2004	N/A	224	No	978-0-7851-1638-7	2012-04-11	1966-67	Roy Thomas
39	Silver	The Incredible Hulk Vol. 2	The Hulk stories from Tales to Astonish #59-79	29 Dec. 2004	N/A	266	No	978-0-7851-1654-7	2012-03-07	1964-66	Stan Lee
40	Bronze	The Uncanny X-Men Vol. 5	The X-Men #132-140, Annual #4, material from Bizarre Adventures #27 and Phoenix: The Untold Story	19 Jan. 2005	N/A	312	No	978-0-7851-1698-1	2012-07-11	1980	Chris Claremont
41	Silver	Daredevil Vol. 3	Daredevil #22-32 and Annual #1	16 Feb. 2005	N/A	304	No	978-0-7851-1696-7	2012-05-09	1966-67	Gene Colan
42	Silver	The Fantastic Four Vol. 8	The Fantastic Four #72-81 and Annual #6	March 2005	N/A	272	No	978-0-7851-1694-3	2012-08-08	1968	Stan Lee
43	Golden	Golden Age: Captain America Vol. 1	Captain America Comics #1-4	March 2005	N/A	264	No	978-0-7851-1619-6	2012-09-05	1941	Roy Thomas
44	Silver	The Amazing Spider-Man Vol. 7	The Amazing Spider-Man #62-67, Annual #5, and The Spectacular Spider-Man magazine #1-2	April 2005	April 2009	320	No	978-0-7851-1636-3	2012-06-06	1968	John Romita Sr.
45	Silver	The Invincible Iron Man Vol. 2	The Iron Man stories from Tales of Suspense #51-65	25 May 2005	N/A	240	No	978-0-7851-1771-1	2012-10-10	1964-65	Stan Lee
46	Silver	Captain America Vol. 2	The Captain America stories from Tales of Suspense #82-99 and Captain America #100	June 2005	N/A	240	No	978-0-7851-1785-8	2012-11-07	1966-68	Stan Lee
47	Golden	Golden Age: Sub-Mariner Vol. 1	Sub-Mariner Comics #1-4	June 2005	N/A	280	No	978-0-7851-1617-2	2012-12-12	1941	Roy Thomas
48	Silver	The X-Men Vol. 5	The X-Men #43-53, The Avengers #53, The Angel stories from Ka-Zar #2-3 and Marvel Tales #30	13 July 2005	N/A	304	No	978-0-7851-1787-2	2013-01-08	1968-69	Stan Lee
49	Silver	Doctor Strange Vol. 2	The Doctor Strange stories from Strange Tales #142-168	14 Sept. 2005	N/A	304	No	978-0-7851-1737-7	2013-02-05	1966-68	Stan Lee
50	Silver	Captain Marvel Vol. 1	The Captain Marvel stories from Marvel Super-Heroes #12-13 and Captain Marvel #1-9	21 Sept. 2005	N/A	240	No	978-0-7851-1821-3	2013-03-19	1967-69	Roy Thomas
51	Golden	Golden Age: Human Torch Vol. 1	Human Torch Comics #2-5A	26 Oct. 2005	N/A	280	No	978-0-7851-1623-3	2013-04-09	1940-41	Roy Thomas
52	Silver	The Mighty Thor Vol. 4	Journey into Mystery #121-125 and The Mighty Thor #126-130	9 Nov. 2005	N/A	240	No	978-0-7851-1880-0	2013-05-07	1965-66	Stan Lee
53	Silver	The Fantastic Four Vol. 9	The Fantastic Four #82-93	23 Nov. 2005	N/A	272	No	978-0-7851-1846-6	2013-06-04	1969	Stan Lee
54	Silver	The Avengers Vol. 5	The Avengers #41-50 and Annual #1	21 Dec. 2005	N/A	288	No	978-0-7851-1848-0	2013-07-09	1967-68	Roy Thomas
55	Golden	Golden Age: All-Winners Vol. 1	All-Winners Comics #1-4	28 Dec. 2005	N/A	288	No	978-0-7851-1884-8	2013-08-06	1941-42	Roy Thomas
56	Silver	The Incredible Hulk Vol. 3	The Hulk stories from Tales to Astonish #80-101 and The Incredible Hulk #102	18 Jan. 2006	N/A	288	No	978-0-7851-2032-2	2013-09-10	1966-68	Stan Lee
57	Atlas	Atlas Era: Tales to Astonish Vol. 1	Tales to Astonish #1-10	25 Jan. 2006	N/A	272	No	978-0-7851-1889-3	2013-10-08	1959-60	Stan Lee
58	Silver	Sgt. Fury Vol. 1	Sgt. Fury and His Howling Commandos #1-13	15 Feb. 2006	N/A	320	No	978-0-7851-2039-1	2013-11-05	1963-64	Stan Lee
59	Silver	Ant-Man/Giant-Man Vol. 1	The Ant-Man/Giant-Man stories from Tales to Astonish #27 and 35–52	March 2006	N/A	288	No	978-0-7851-2049-0	2013-12-10	1962-64	Dick Ayers
60	Golden	Golden Age: Marvel Comics Vol. 2	Marvel Mystery Comics #5-8	March 2006	N/A	272	No	978-0-7851-2112-1	2014-01-07	1940	Roy Thomas
61	Silver	The X-Men Vol. 6	The X-Men #54-66	April 2006	N/A	320	No	978-0-7851-2056-8	2014-02-18	1969-70	Roy Thomas
62	Silver	The Fantastic Four Vol. 10	The Fantastic Four #94-104	24 May 2006	N/A	272	No	978-0-7851-2061-2	2014-04-01	1970	Stan Lee, plus additional pieces by John Morrow, Dick Ayers, Joe Sinnott, Roy Thomas, Mark Evanier and Greg Theakston
63	Silver	The Rawhide Kid Vol. 1	The Rawhide Kid #17-25	June 2006	N/A	256	No	978-0-7851-2117-6	2014-04-15	1960-61	Stan Lee
64	Silver	Captain America Vol. 3	Captain America #101-113	July 2006	N/A	288	No	978-0-7851-2063-6	2014-05-20	1968-69	John Morrow
65	Silver	The Invincible Iron Man Vol. 3	The Iron Man stories from Tales of Suspense #66-83 and Tales to Astonish #82	23 Aug. 2006	N/A	256	No	978-0-7851-2067-4	2014-06-10	1965-66	Tom Field
66	Silver	The Human Torch Vol. 1	The Human Torch stories from Strange Tales #101-117 and Annual #2	20 Sept. 2006	N/A	272	No	978-0-7851-2070-4	2014-07-08	1962-64	Dick Ayers
67	Silver	The Amazing Spider-Man Vol. 8	The Amazing Spider-Man #68-77 and the Spider-Man story from Marvel Super-Heroes #14	11 Oct. 2006	N/A	240	No	978-0-7851-2074-2	2014-08-12	1968-69	John Romita Sr.
68	Atlas	Atlas Era: Tales of Suspense Vol. 1	Tales of Suspense #1-10	25 Oct. 2006	N/A	272	No	978-0-7851-2353-8	2014-09-09	1959-60	Dr. Michael J. Vassallo
69	Silver	The Mighty Thor Vol. 5	The Mighty Thor #131-140 and Annual #2	22 Nov. 2006	N/A	256	No	978-0-7851-2076-6	2014-10-07	1966-67	Stan Lee
70	Silver	The Avengers Vol. 6	The Avengers #51-58, Annual #2 and The X-Men #45	13 Dec. 2006	N/A	256	No	978-0-7851-2079-7	2014-11-18	1968	Roy Thomas
71	Golden	Golden Age: All-Winners Vol. 2	All-Winners Comics #5-8	28 Dec. 2006	N/A	280	No	978-0-7851-2406-1	2014-12-09	1942-43	Greg Theakston
72	Bronze	Warlock Vol. 1	Marvel Premiere #1-2, Warlock #1-8 and The Incredible Hulk #176-178	10 Jan. 2007	N/A	288	No	978-0-7851-2411-5	2015-01-06	1972-73	Roy Thomas
73	Atlas	Atlas Era: Heroes Vol. 1	Marvel Boy #1-2, Astonishing #3-6 and Young Men #24-28	24 Jan. 2007	N/A	304	No	978-0-7851-2408-5		1950-51, 1953–54	Roy Thomas
74	Silver	Daredevil Vol. 4	Daredevil #33-41 and The Fantastic Four #73	28 Feb. 2007	N/A	224	No	978-0-7851-2072-8		1967-68	Stan Lee
75	Silver	Doctor Strange Vol. 3	Doctor Strange #169-179 and The Avengers #61	March 2007	N/A	256	No	978-0-7851-2410-8		1968-69	Roy Thomas
76	Golden	Golden Age: U.S.A. Comics Vol. 1	U.S.A. Comics #1-4	March 2007	N/A	280	No	978-0-7851-2478-8		1941-42	Dr. Michael J. Vassallo
77	Silver	The Invincible Iron Man Vol. 4	The Iron Man stories from Tales of Suspense #84-99, Iron Man and the Sub-Mariner #1, and The Invincible Iron Man #1	April 2007	N/A	256	No	978-0-7851-2678-2		1966-68	Arlen Schumer
78	Silver	The Incredible Hulk Vol. 4	The Incredible Hulk #103-110 and Annual #1	9 May 2007	N/A	240	No	978-0-7851-2682-9		1968	Herb Trimpe
79	Silver	The Sub-Mariner Vol. 2	The Sub-Mariner stories from Tales to Astonish #88-101, Iron Man and the Sub-Mariner #1, and The Sub-Mariner #1	June 2007	N/A	240	No	978-0-7851-2688-1		1967-68	Roy Thomas
80	Silver	The Mighty Thor Vol. 6	The Thor stories and the Tales of Asgard stories from The Mighty Thor #141-152	July 2007	N/A	224	No	978-0-7851-2690-4		1967-68	Mark Evanier
81	Golden	Golden Age: Sub-Mariner Vol. 2	Sub-Mariner Comics #5-8	Aug. 2007	N/A	280	No	978-0-7851-2247-0		1942	Roy Thomas
82	Silver	Captain Marvel Vol. 2	Captain Marvel #10-21	29 Aug. 2007	N/A	272	No	978-0-7851-2430-6		1969-70	Roy Thomas
83	Silver	Nick Fury, Agent of S.H.I.E.L.D. Vol. 1	The Nick Fury stories from Strange Tales #135-153, the Captain America story from Tales of Suspense #78 and The Fantastic Four #21	Sept. 2007	N/A	288	No	978-0-7851-2686-7		1963, 1965–67	John Morrow
84	Silver	The Avengers Vol. 7	The Avengers #59-68 and the Black Knight story from Marvel Super-Heroes #17	17 Oct. 2007	N/A	256	No	978-0-7851-2680-5		1968-69	Roy Thomas
85	Atlas	Atlas Era: Strange Tales Vol. 1	Strange Tales #1-10	31 Oct. 2007	N/A	272	No	978-0-7851-2771-0		1951-52	Dr. Michael J. Vassallo
86	Silver	The Amazing Spider-Man Vol. 9	The Amazing Spider-Man #78-87	28 Nov. 2007	N/A	224	No	978-0-7851-2462-7		1969-70	John Romita Sr.
87	Silver	The Rawhide Kid Vol. 2	The Rawhide Kid #26-35	19 Dec. 2007	N/A	272	No	978-0-7851-2684-3		1962-63	Mark Evanier
88	Golden	Golden Age: Human Torch Vol. 2	Human Torch Comics #5B-8	27 Dec. 2007	N/A	280	No	978-0-7851-2250-0		1941-42	Roy Thomas
89	Golden	Golden Age: Daring Mystery Vol. 1	Daring Mystery Comics #1-4	23 Jan. 2008	N/A	280	No	978-0-7851-2476-4		1940	Ronin Ro
90	Bronze	The Uncanny X-Men Vol. 6	The X-Men #141 and The Uncanny X-Men #142-150	20 Feb. 2008	N/A	256	No	978-0-7851-3013-0		1981	Terry Austin
91	Silver	Ant-Man/Giant-Man Vol. 2	The Ant-Man/Giant-Man stories from Tales to Astonish #53-69	20 Feb. 2008	N/A	304	No	978-0-7851-2911-0		1964-65	Stan Lee
92	Atlas	Atlas Era: Heroes Vol. 2	Men's Adventures #27-28, Captain America #76-78, Human Torch #36-38 and the Human Torch story from Marvel Super-Heroes #16	27 Feb. 2008	N/A	240	No	978-0-7851-2460-3		1954, 1968	Roy Thomas
93	Silver	Captain America Vol. 4	Captain America #114-124	March 2008	N/A	240	No	978-0-7851-2936-3		1969-70	Gene Colan
94	Atlas	Atlas Era: Tales to Astonish Vol. 2	Tales to Astonish #11-20	March 2008	N/A	272	No	978-0-7851-2913-4		1960-61	Michael Allred
95	Bronze	Captain Marvel Vol. 3	Captain Marvel #22-33 and The Invincible Iron Man #55	April 2008	N/A	288	No	978-0-7851-3015-4		1972-74	Roy Thomas
96	Silver	The Mighty Thor Vol. 7	The Mighty Thor #153-162	21 May 2008	N/A	224	No	978-0-7851-2924-0		1968-69	Arlen Schumer
97	Silver	Sgt. Fury Vol. 2	Sgt. Fury and His Howling Commandos #14-23 and Annual #1	June 2008	N/A	240	No	978-0-7851-2928-8		1965	Dick Ayers
98	Atlas	Atlas Era: Tales of Suspense Vol. 2	Tales of Suspense #11-20	June 2008	N/A	272	No	978-0-7851-2959-2		1960-61	Roger Langridge
99	Golden	Golden Age: Captain America Vol. 2	Captain America Comics #5-8	23 July 2008	N/A	280	No	978-0-7851-2228-9		1941	Gerard Jones
100	Bronze	The Defenders Vol. 1	The Sub-Mariner #34-35, Marvel Feature #1-3 and The Defenders #1-6	30 July 2008	N/A	256	No	978-0-7851-3044-4		1971-73	Roy Thomas (Afterword by Steve Englehart)
101	Bronze	The Amazing Spider-Man Vol. 10	The Amazing Spider-Man #88-99	20 Aug. 2008	N/A	256	No	978-0-7851-2932-5		1970-71	Stan Lee
102	Golden	Golden Age: Marvel Comics Vol. 3	Marvel Mystery Comics #9-12	27 Aug. 2008	N/A	272	No	978-0-7851-2472-6		1940	Roy Thomas
103	Bronze	The Fantastic Four Vol. 11	The Fantastic Four #105-116	17 Sept. 2008	N/A	272	No	978-0-7851-3046-8		1970-71	Jon B. Cooke
104	Atlas	Atlas Era: Heroes Vol. 3	Sub-Mariner Comics #33-42	24 Sept. 2008	N/A	272	No	978-0-7851-2930-1		1954-55	Roy Thomas
105	Bronze	The X-Men Vol. 7	The Beast stories from Amazing Adventures #11-17, Marvel Team-Up #4, The Amazing Spider-Man #92, The Incredible Hulk #150 and 161, plus the covers to The X-Men #67-80 and Annual #1-2	22 Oct. 2008	N/A	256	No	978-0-7851-3048-2		1970-73	Steve Englehart
106	Atlas	Atlas Era: Journey into Mystery Vol. 1	Journey into Mystery #1-10	29 Oct. 2008	N/A	272	No	978-0-7851-2926-4		1952-53	Dr. Michael J. Vassallo
107	Silver	The Invincible Iron Man Vol. 5	The Invincible Iron Man #2-13	19 Nov. 2008	N/A	272	No	978-0-7851-3493-0		1968-69	Dewey Cassell
108	Golden	Golden Age: All-Winners Vol. 3	All-Winners Comics #9-14	26 Nov. 2008	N/A	304	No	978-0-7851-3357-5		1943-44	Roy Thomas
109	Silver	The Avengers Vol. 8	The Avengers #69-79	17 Dec. 2008	N/A	240	No	978-0-7851-2934-9		1969-70	Roy Thomas
110	Silver	Daredevil Vol. 5	Daredevil #42-53 and the Scaredevil story from Not Brand Echh #4	21 Jan. 2009	N/A	272	No	978-0-7851-3042-0		1968-69	Gene Colan
111	Golden	Golden Age: Captain America Vol. 3	Captain America Comics #9-12	28 Jan. 2009	N/A	280	No	978-0-7851-2878-6		1941-42	Michael Uslan
112	Silver	The Mighty Thor Vol. 8	The Mighty Thor #163-172	25 Feb. 2009	N/A	224	No	978-0-7851-3497-8		1969-70	Jon B. Cooke
113	Atlas	Atlas Era: Strange Tales Vol. 2	Strange Tales #11-20	25 Feb. 2009	N/A	272	No	978-0-7851-3489-3		1952-53	Dr. Michael J. Vassallo
114	Silver	The Human Torch Vol. 2	The Human Torch stories from Strange Tales #118-134	April 2009	N/A	256	No	978-0-7851-3505-0		1964-65	Bruce Canwell
115	Silver	The Incredible Hulk Vol. 5	The Incredible Hulk #111-121	6 May 2009	N/A	240	No	978-0-7851-3491-6		1969	Herb Trimpe
116	Golden	Golden Age: Marvel Comics Vol. 4	Marvel Mystery Comics #13-16	April 2009	N/A	280	No	978-0-7851-2474-0		1940-41	Roy Thomas
117	Bronze	The Avengers Vol. 9	The Avengers #80-88 and The Incredible Hulk #140	28 May 2009	N/A	224	No	978-0-7851-3501-2		1970-71	Roy Thomas
118	Atlas	Atlas Era: Journey into Mystery Vol. 2	Journey into Mystery #11-20	27 May 2009	N/A	272	No	978-0-7851-3499-2		1953-54	Dr. Michael J. Vassallo
119	Bronze	Warlock Vol. 2	Strange Tales #178-181, Warlock #9-15, Marvel Team-Up #55, Avengers Annual #7 and Marvel Two-In-One Annual #2	June 2009	N/A	320	No	978-0-7851-3511-1		1975-76	Jon B. Cooke
120	Silver	The Sub-Mariner Vol. 3	The Sub-Mariner #2-13	5 Aug. 2009	N/A	272	No	978-0-7851-3487-9		1968-69	Roy Thomas
121	Golden	Golden Age: Young Allies Vol. 1	Young Allies #1-4	5 Aug. 2009	N/A	288	No	978-0-7851-2876-2		1941-42	Michael Uslan
122	Bronze	The Amazing Spider-Man Vol. 11	The Amazing Spider-Man #100-109	20 Aug. 2009	N/A	256	No	978-0-7851-3507-4		1971-72	Roy Thomas (Afterword by John Romita)
123	Atlas	Atlas Era: Black Knight/Yellow Claw Vol. 1	Black Knight #1-5 and Yellow Claw #1-4	29 Aug. 2009	N/A	256	No	978-0-7851-3515-9		1955-57	Roy Thomas (Afterword by Dr. Michael J. Vassallo)
124	Silver	The Invincible Iron Man Vol. 6	The Invincible Iron Man #14-25	16 Sep 2009	N/A	264	No	978-0-7851-4129-7		1969-70	George Tuska
125	Silver	Inhumans Vol. 1	The Inhumans stories from The Mighty Thor #146-152, Amazing Adventures #1-10 and The Avengers #95, the Medusa story from Marvel Super-Heroes #15 and material from Not Brand Echh #6 and 12	21 Oct. 2009	N/A	240	No	978-0-7851-4141-9		1967-72	Mark Evanier
126	Atlas	Atlas Era: Menace Vol. 1	Menace #1-11	28 Oct. 2009	N/A	304	No	978-0-7851-3509-8		1953-54	Dr. Michael J. Vassallo
127	Bronze	Deathlok Vol. 1	Astonishing Tales #25-28 and 30–36, Marvel Spotlight #33, Marvel Team-Up #46, Marvel Two-In-One #27 and 54, Marvel Fanfare #4 and Captain America #286-288	25 Nov. 2009	N/A	352	No	978-0-7851-3050-5		1974-77, 1979, 1982–83	Rich Buckler
128	Golden	Golden Age: Sub-Mariner Vol. 3	Sub-Mariner Comics #9-12	9 Dec. 2009	N/A	240	No	978-0-7851-3351-3		1943	Roy Thomas
129	Silver	Nick Fury, Agent of S.H.I.E.L.D. Vol. 2	The Nick Fury stories from Strange Tales #154-168 and Nick Fury, Agent of S.H.I.E.L.D. #1-3	23 Dec. 2009	N/A	272	No	978-0-7851-3503-6		1967-68	Jim Steranko
130	Silver	Doctor Strange Vol. 4	Doctor Strange #180-183, The Sub-Mariner #22, The Incredible Hulk #126, Marvel Feature #1 and Marvel Premiere #3-8	20 Jan. 2010	N/A	272	No	978-0-7851-3495-4		1969-73	Roy Thomas
131	Atlas	Atlas Era: Jungle Adventure Vol. 1	Lorna, the Jungle Queen #1-5 and Lorna, the Jungle Girl #6-9	20 Jan. 2010	N/A	248	No	978-0-7851-4190-7		1953-54	Dr. Michael J. Vassallo
132	Bronze	The Fantastic Four Vol. 12	The Fantastic Four #117-128	24 Feb. 2010	N/A	272	No	978-0-7851-4218-8		1971-72	Stan Lee, Roy Thomas
133	Golden	Golden Age: Daring Mystery Vol. 2	Daring Mystery Comics #5-8	24 Feb. 2010	N/A	280	No	978-0-7851-3364-3		1940-42	Will Murray
134	Bronze	The X-Men Vol. 8	The Avengers #110-111, The Incredible Hulk #172, 180 and 181, Captain America #172-175, Marvel Team-Up #23 and 38, The Defenders #15-16 and Giant-Size Fantastic Four #4, plus the covers to X-Men 81–93	March 2010	N/A	304	No	978-0-7851-4222-5		1973-75	Roy Thomas, Steve Englehart
135	Atlas	Atlas Era: Tales to Astonish Vol. 3	Tales to Astonish #21-30	March 2010	N/A	272	No	978-0-7851-4196-9		1961-62	Jon B. Cooke
136	Bronze	Inhumans Vol. 2	The Inhumans #1-12, Captain Marvel #52-53, Fantastic Four Annual #12, Marvel Fanfare #14, What If? #29-30 and Thor Annual #12	April 2010	N/A	320	No	978-0-7851-4151-8		1975-77	Doug Moench
137	Bronze	The Avengers Vol. 10	The Avengers #89-100	19 May 2010	N/A	304	No	978-0-7851-3331-5		1971-72	Roy Thomas, Steve Englehart
138	Golden	Golden Age: Captain America Vol. 4	Captain America Comics #13-16	26 May 2010	N/A	280	No	978-0-7851-3361-2		1942	Michael Uslan
139	Bronze	Captain America Vol. 5	Captain America #125-136	June 2010	N/A	248	No	978-0-7851-4200-3		1970-71	Bruce Canwell
140	Atlas	Atlas Era: Strange Tales Vol. 3	Strange Tales #21-30	June 2010	N/A	256	No	978-0-7851-4192-1		1953-54	Dr. Michael J. Vassallo
141	Bronze	Black Panther Vol. 1	The Black Panther stories from Jungle Action #6-24	July 2010	N/A	352	No	978-0-7851-4198-3		1973-76	Don McGregor (afterword by Dwayne McDuffie)
142	Golden	Golden Age: Human Torch Vol. 3	Human Torch Comics #9-12	July 2010	N/A	264	No	978-0-7851-3349-0		1942-43	Roy Thomas
143	Silver	Sgt. Fury Vol. 3	Sgt. Fury and His Howling Commandos #24-32 and Annual #2	18 Aug. 2010	N/A	224	No	978-0-7851-4212-6		1965-66	Roy Thomas
144	Atlas	Atlas Era: Tales of Suspense Vol. 3	Tales of Suspense #21-31	25 Aug. 2010	N/A	304	No	978-0-7851-4194-5		1961-62	Arthur Adams
145	Bronze	The Amazing Spider-Man Vol. 12	The Amazing Spider-Man #110-120	15 Sept. 2010	N/A	240	No	978-0-7851-4214-0		1972-73	John Romita
146	Bronze	The Mighty Thor Vol. 9	The Mighty Thor #173-183	20 Oct. 2010	N/A	240	No	978-0-7851-4220-1		1970	Will Murray
147	Atlas	Atlas Era: Journey into Mystery Vol. 3	Journey into Mystery #21-30	20 Oct. 2010	N/A	272	No	978-0-7851-4188-4		1955-56	Dr. Michael J. Vassallo
148	Bronze	The Defenders Vol. 2	The Defenders #7-16, Giant-Size Defenders #1 and The Avengers #115-118	17 Nov. 2010	N/A	312	No	978-0-7851-4216-4		1973-74	Steve Englehart
149	Golden	Golden Age: Marvel Comics Vol. 5	Marvel Mystery Comics #17-20	24 Nov. 2010	N/A	280	No	978-0-7851-3367-4		1941	Roy Thomas
150	Bronze	Marvel Team-Up Vol. 1	Marvel Team-Up #1-11	15 Dec. 2010	N/A	248	No	978-0-7851-4210-2		1972-73	Gerry Conway
151	Bronze	The Uncanny X-Men Vol. 7	The Uncanny X-Men #151-159, Annual #5 and Avengers Annual #10	12 Jan. 2011	N/A	304	No	978-0-7851-3513-5		1981-82	Louise Simonson
152	Atlas	Atlas Era: Battlefield Vol. 1	Battlefield #1-11	19 Jan. 2011	N/A	336	No	978-0-7851-5010-7		1952-53	Dr. Michael J. Vassallo
153	Silver	The Sub-Mariner Vol. 4	The Sub-Mariner #14-25	9 Feb. 2011	N/A	240	No	978-0-7851-5048-0		1969-70	Roy Thomas
154	Golden	Golden Age: Mystic Comics Vol. 1	Mystic Comics #1-4	March 2011	N/A	272	No	978-0-7851-4206-5		1940	Will Murray
155	Bronze	The Amazing Spider-Man Vol. 13	The Amazing Spider-Man #121-131	March 2011	N/A	240	No	978-0-7851-5036-7		1973-74	Gerry Conway
156	Atlas	Atlas Era: Strange Tales Vol. 4	Strange Tales #31-39	March 2011	N/A	248	No	978-0-7851-5014-5		1954-55	Dr. Michael J. Vassallo
157	Bronze	Doctor Strange Vol. 5	Marvel Premiere #9-14 and Doctor Strange #1-9	April 2011	N/A	288	No	978-0-7851-5022-0		1973-75	Steve Englehart, Frank Brunner
158	Bronze	The Mighty Thor Vol. 10	The Mighty Thor #184-194	25 May 2011	N/A	248	No	978-0-7851-5046-6		1971	Stan Lee
159	Atlas	Atlas Era: Jungle Adventure Vol. 2	Jungle Tales #1-4, Jungle Action #1-3 and Lorna, the Jungle Girl #10-12	June 2011	N/A	272	No	978-0-7851-5012-1		1954-55	Dr. Michael J. Vassallo
160	Bronze	Iron Fist Vol. 1	Marvel Premiere #15-25 and Iron Fist #1-2	June 2011	N/A	256	No	978-0-7851-5032-9		1974-75	Roy Thomas
161	Golden	Golden Age: Captain America Vol. 5	Captain America Comics #17-20	June 2011	N/A	280	No	978-0-7851-4202-7		1942	Michael Uslan
162	Bronze	The Avengers Vol. 11	The Avengers #101-111 and Daredevil #99	13 July 2011	N/A	272	No	978-0-7851-5038-1		1972-73	Roy Thomas
163	Silver	Daredevil Vol. 6	Daredevil #54-63	10 Aug. 2011	N/A	224	No	978-0-7851-5020-6		1969-70	Clifford Meth
164	Atlas	Atlas Era: Venus Vol. 1	Venus #1-9 and the Venus stories from Lana #4 and Marvel Mystery Comics #91	17 Aug. 2011	N/A	296	No	978-0-7851-5018-3		1948-50	Dr. Michael J. Vassallo
165	Bronze	The Invincible Iron Man Vol. 7	The Invincible Iron Man #26-38 and Daredevil #73	14 Sept. 2011	N/A	288	No	978-0-7851-5044-2		1970-71	Gerry Conway
166	Golden	Golden Age: Marvel Comics Vol. 6	Marvel Mystery Comics #21-24	21 Sept. 2011	N/A	280	No	978-0-7851-4204-1		1941	Roy Thomas
167	Silver	The Incredible Hulk Vol. 6	The Incredible Hulk #122-134	12 Oct. 2011	N/A	280	No	978-0-7851-5042-8		1969-70	Roy Thomas
168	Atlas	Atlas Era: Strange Tales Vol. 5	Strange Tales #40-48	19 Oct. 2011	N/A	248	No	978-0-7851-5016-9		1955-56	Dr. Michael J. Vassallo
169	Bronze	The Fantastic Four Vol. 13	The Fantastic Four #129-141	9 Nov. 2011	N/A	288	No	978-0-7851-5040-4		1972-73	Roy Thomas, Gerry Conway
170	Golden	Golden Age: All-Winners Vol. 4	All-Winners Comics #15-19, 21 and (vol. 2) #1	16 Nov. 2011	N/A	312	No	978-0-7851-3359-9		1945-46, 1948	Roy Thomas
171	Silver	Nick Fury, Agent of S.H.I.E.L.D. Vol. 3	Nick Fury, Agent of S.H.I.E.L.D. #4-15, The Avengers #72 and Marvel Spotlight #31	14 Dec. 2011	N/A	320	No	978-0-7851-5034-3		1968-69	Roy Thomas
172	Golden	Golden Age: U.S.A. Comics Vol. 2	U.S.A. Comics #5-8	21 Dec. 2011	N/A	280	No	978-0-7851-3365-0		1942-43	Dr. Michael J. Vassallo
173	Bronze	Captain Marvel Vol. 4	Captain Marvel #34-46	11 Jan. 2012	N/A	248	No	978-0-7851-5877-6		1974-76	Steve Englehart
174	Atlas	Atlas Era: Tales to Astonish Vol. 4	Tales to Astonish #31-34 and material from #35-51 and 54	18 Jan. 2012	N/A	304	No	978-0-7851-5881-3		1962-64	Nick Caputo
175	Bronze	The Uncanny X-Men Vol. 8	The Uncanny X-Men #160-167, Annual #6; X-Men Special Edition #1, and material from Marvel Treasury Edition #26-27	Feb. 2012	N/A	288	No	978-0-7851-5869-1		1982-83	Louise Simonson
176	Bronze	The Mighty Thor Vol. 11	The Mighty Thor #195-205	March 2012	N/A	256	No	978-0-7851-5885-1		1972	Gerry Conway
177	Golden	Golden Age: Young Allies Vol. 2	Young Allies #5-8	April 2012	N/A	280	No	978-0-7851-5030-5		1942-43	Will Murray
178	Bronze	Captain America Vol. 6	Captain America #137-148	April 2012	N/A	280	No	978-0-7851-5875-2		1971-72	John Romita Sr.
179	Bronze	The Avengers Vol. 12	The Avengers #112-119, The Defenders #8-11 and material from FOOM #5-7	9 May 2012	N/A	264	No	978-0-7851-5879-0		1973-74	Steve Englehart
180	Atlas	Atlas Era: Journey into Mystery Vol. 4	Journey into Mystery #31-40	16 May 2012	N/A	272	No	978-0-7851-5925-4		1956	Dr. Michael J. Vassallo
181	Bronze	Marvel Team-Up Vol. 2	Marvel Team-Up #12-22 and Daredevil #103	June 2012	N/A	256	No	978-0-7851-5933-9		1973-74	Roy Thomas
182	Bronze	The Amazing Spider-Man Vol. 14	The Amazing Spider-Man #132-142 and Giant-Size Super-Heroes #1	11 July 2012	N/A	256	No	978-0-7851-5975-9		1974-75	Gerry Conway
183	Golden	Golden Age: Marvel Comics Vol. 7	Marvel Mystery Comics #25-28	18 July 2012	N/A	280	No	978-0-7851-5026-8		1941-42	Roy Thomas
184	Bronze	The Defenders Vol. 3	The Defenders #17-21, Giant-Size Defenders #2-4, Marvel Two-In-One #6-7, and material from Mystery Tales #21, World of Fantasy #11 and Tales of Suspense #9	22 Aug. 2012	N/A	256	No	978-0-7851-5961-2		1974-75	Roy Thomas
185	Bronze	Iron Fist Vol. 2	Iron Fist #3-15 and Marvel Team-Up #63-64	12 Sept. 2012	N/A	288	No	978-0-7851-5955-1		1976-77	Bruce Canwell
186	Atlas	Atlas Era: Tales of Suspense Vol. 4	Tales of Suspense #32-48 and 50–54	19 Sept. 2012	N/A	304	No	978-0-7851-5867-7		1962-64	Barry Pearl
187	Silver	Sgt. Fury Vol. 4	Sgt. Fury and His Howling Commandos #33-43	10 Oct. 2012	N/A	240	No	978-0-7851-5959-9		1966-67	Roy Thomas
188	Bronze	The Fantastic Four Vol. 14	The Fantastic Four #142-150, Giant-Size Super-Stars #1, Giant-Size Fantastic Four #2 and The Avengers #127	14 Nov. 2012	N/A	272	No	978-0-7851-5963-6		1974	Gerry Conway
189	Golden	Golden Age: Captain America Vol. 6	Captain America Comics #21-24	12 Dec. 2012	N/A	280	No	978-0-7851-5024-4		1942-43	Will Murray
190	Silver	Ka-Zar Vol. 1	The Ka-Zar stories from Marvel Super-Heroes #19, Astonishing Tales #1-16 and Savage Tales #1	16 Jan. 2013	N/A	312	No	978-0-7851-5957-5		1969-73	Roy Thomas
191	Atlas	Atlas Era: Jungle Adventure Vol. 3	Jungle Tales #5-7, Jungle Action #4-6 and Lorna, the Jungle Girl #13-16	20 Feb. 2013	N/A	280	No	978-0-7851-5927-8		1955	Dr. Michael J. Vassallo
192	Bronze	The Amazing Spider-Man Vol. 15	The Amazing Spider-Man #143-155 and material from Marvel Special Edition Treasury #1	20 March 2013	N/A	264	No	978-0-7851-6631-3		1975-76	Gerry Conway
193	Bronze	The Incredible Hulk Vol. 7	The Incredible Hulk #135-144, The Avengers #88, and the Phantom Eagle story from Marvel Super-Heroes #16	30 April 2013	N/A	256	No	978-0-7851-6668-9		1971	Roy Thomas
194	Bronze	The Invincible Iron Man Vol. 8	The Invincible Iron Man #39-53	22 May 2013	N/A	320	No	978-0-7851-6623-8		1971-72	Gerry Conway, Mike Friedrich
195	Bronze	The Avengers Vol. 13	The Avengers #120-128, Giant-Size Avengers #1, Captain Marvel #33 and Fantastic Four #150	June 2013	N/A	272	No	978-0-7851-6629-0		1974	Steve Englehart
196	Bronze	Doctor Strange Vol. 6	Doctor Strange #10-22, Annual #1 and The Tomb of Dracula #44	17 July 2013	N/A	288	No	978-0-7851-6786-0		1975-77	Steve Englehart
197	Bronze	The Fantastic Four Vol. 15	The Fantastic Four #151-163, Giant-Size Fantastic Four #3-4 and material from Marvel Treasury Edition #2	21 Aug. 2013	N/A	312	No	978-0-7851-6625-2		1974-75	Roy Thomas
198	Bronze	Daredevil Vol. 7	Daredevil #64-74 and The Invincible Iron Man #35-36	18 Sept. 2013	N/A	264	No	978-0-7851-6644-3		1970-71	Roy Thomas
199	Bronze	The Mighty Thor Vol. 12	The Mighty Thor #206-216	23 Oct. 2013	N/A	240	No	978-0-7851-6621-4		1972-73	Gerry Conway
200	Bronze	Marvel Two-In-One Vol. 1	Marvel Feature #11-12 and Marvel Two-In-One #1-10	26 Nov. 2013	N/A	248	No	978-0-7851-6633-7		1973-75	Roy Thomas
201	Atlas	Atlas Era: Strange Tales Vol. 6	Strange Tales #49-57	31 Dec. 2013	N/A	248	No	978-0-7851-5929-2		1956-57	Dr. Michael J. Vassallo
202	Bronze	The Sub-Mariner Vol. 5	The Sub-Mariner #26-38 and the Hercules story from Ka-Zar #1	15 Jan. 2014	N/A	288	No	978-0-7851-6619-1		1970-71	Roy Thomas
203	Bronze	The Defenders Vol. 4	The Defenders #22-30, Giant-Size Defenders #5, and the Guardians of the Galaxy story from Marvel Super-Heroes #18	12 Feb. 2014	N/A	248	No	978-0-7851-6627-6		1975	Steve Englehart
204	Bronze	Captain America Vol. 7	Captain America #149-159	March 2014	N/A	248	No	978-0-7851-8799-8		1972-73	Steve Englehart
205	Bronze	The Amazing Spider-Man Vol. 16	The Amazing Spider-Man #156-168 and Annual #10	April 2014	N/A	288	No	978-0-7851-8801-8		1976-77	J.M. DeMatteis
206	Bronze	Daredevil Vol. 8	Daredevil #75-84 and Amazing Adventures #1-8	14 May 2014	N/A	312	No	978-0-7851-8841-4		1971-72	Gerry Conway
207	Bronze	Captain Marvel Vol. 5	Captain Marvel #47-57, Avengers Annual #7 and Marvel Two-In-One Annual #2	June 2014	N/A	288	No	978-0-7851-8892-6		1976-78	Roy Thomas
208	Bronze	The Avengers Vol. 14	The Avengers #129-135, Giant-Size Avengers #2-4, and material from FOOM #12	16 July 2014	N/A	268	No	978-0-7851-8805-6		1974-75	Steve Englehart
209	Silver	Marvel Rarities Vol. 1	Doctor Droom stories from Amazing Adventures #1-4 and 6; Tales of The Watcher stories from Tales of Suspense #49-58, The Silver Surfer #1-7, and Marvel Super-Heroes #23; Doctor Doom stories from Marvel Super-Heroes #20 and Astonishing Tales #1-8	13 Aug 2014	N/A	344	No	978-0-7851-8809-4		1961-71	Roy Thomas
210	Bronze	The Fantastic Four Vol. 16	The Fantastic Four #164-175 and Annual #11, Marvel Two-In-One #20 and Annual #1	10 Sept. 2014	N/A	328	No	978-0-7851-8845-2		1975-76	Roy Thomas
211	Bronze	Ms. Marvel Vol. 1	Ms. Marvel #1-14	8 Oct. 2014	N/A	272	No	978-0-7851-8811-7		1977-78	Gerry Conway
212	Bronze	The Incredible Hulk Vol. 8	The Incredible Hulk #145-156	12 Nov. 2014	N/A	288	No	978-0-7851-8854-4		1971-72	Herb Trimpe
213	Bronze	The Mighty Thor Vol. 13	The Mighty Thor #217-228 and material from Marvel Treasury Edition #4	Dec. 2014	N/A	256	No	978-0-7851-8856-8		1973-74	Gerry Conway
214	Bronze	The Uncanny X-Men Vol. 9	The Uncanny X-Men #168-175, Annual #7; Marvel Graphic Novel No. 5 - X-Men: God Loves, Man Kills and Wolverine #1-4	Jan. 2015	N/A	432	No	978-0-7851-9155-1		1983	Louise Simonson
215	Bronze	The Sub-Mariner Vol. 6	The Sub-Mariner #39-49 and Daredevil #77	11 Feb. 2015	N/A	280	No	978-0-7851-9184-1		1971-72	Gerry Conway
216	Bronze	The Invincible Iron Man Vol. 9	The Invincible Iron Man #54-67	11 March 2015	N/A	304	No	978-0-7851-9190-2		1973-74	Mike Friedrich
217	Bronze	The Avengers Vol. 15	The Avengers #136-149	15 April 2015	N/A	264	No	978-0-7851-9196-4		1975-76	Steve Englehart
218	Bronze	The Incredible Hulk Vol. 9	The Incredible Hulk #157-170	13 May 2015	N/A	304	No	978-0-7851-9194-0		1972-73	Steve Englehart
219	Silver	Not Brand Echh Vol. 1	Not Brand Echh #1-13 and material from Daredevil Annual #1, Fantastic Four Annual #5, Sgt. Fury Annual #4, Avengers Annual #2 and Amazing Spider-Man Annual #1 and 5	3 June 2015	N/A	456	No	978-0-7851-9070-7		1967-69	Roy Thomas
220	Bronze	The Fantastic Four Vol. 17	The Fantastic Four #176-191	10 June 2015	N/A	272	No	978-0-7851-9192-6		1976-78	Roy Thomas, Len Wein
221	Bronze	The Mighty Thor Vol. 14	The Mighty Thor #229-241	15 July 2015	N/A	280	No	978-0-7851-9188-9		1974-75	Gerry Conway
222	Bronze	Luke Cage, Hero for Hire Vol. 1	Luke Cage, Hero for Hire #1-16	3 June 2015	N/A	336	No	978-0-7851-9180-3		1972-73	Steve Englehart
223	Bronze	Daredevil Vol. 9	Daredevil #85-96	16 Sept 2015	N/A	272	No	978-0-7851-9152-0		1972	Gerry Conway
224	Bronze	The Defenders Vol. 5	The Defenders #31-41, Annual #1 and Marvel Treasury Edition #12	14 Oct. 2015	N/A	280	No	978-0-7851-9182-7		1976	Stuart Moore
225	Bronze	Spider-Woman Vol. 1	Marvel Spotlight #32, Marvel Two-In-One #29-33 and Spider-Woman #1-8	11 Nov. 2015	N/A	272	No	978-0-7851-9178-0		1977-78	Marv Wolfman
226	Bronze	The Amazing Spider-Man Vol. 17	The Amazing Spider-Man #169-180, Annual #11, Nova #12 and Marvel Treasury Edition #14	9 Dec. 2015	N/A	288	No	978-0-7851-9186-5		1977-78	Len Wein
227	Bronze	The Sub-Mariner Vol. 7	The Sub-Mariner #50-60	13 Jan. 2016	N/A	240	No	978-0-7851-9915-1		1972-73	Roy Thomas
228	Bronze	Daredevil Vol. 10	Daredevil #97-107 and The Avengers #111	10 Feb. 2016	N/A	264	No	978-0-7851-9917-5		1973-74	Jon B. Cooke
229	Bronze	The Champions Vol. 1	The Champions #1-17, Iron Man Annual #4, The Avengers #163, Super-Villain Team-Up #14, Peter Parker, the Spectacular Spider-Man #17-18 and The Incredible Hulk Annual #7	24 Feb. 2016	N/A	449	No	978-0-7851-9692-1		1975-78	Tony Isabella
230	Bronze	The Mighty Thor Vol. 15	The Mighty Thor #242-254, Annual #5 and Marvel Spotlight #30	9 March 2016	N/A	304	No	978-0-7851-9919-9		1975-76	Len Wein
231	Bronze	Captain America Vol. 8	Captain America #160-175	12 April 2016	N/A	336	No	978-0-7851-9929-8		1973-74	Steve Englehart
232	Bronze	Captain Marvel Vol. 6	Captain Marvel #58-62, Marvel Spotlight #1-4 and 8, Marvel Graphic Novel No. 1, and material from Marvel Super Heroes (1990) #3	May 2016	N/A	296	No	978-0-7851-9995-3		1978-80, 1982, 1990	Roger Stern
233	Bronze	The Avengers Vol. 16	The Avengers #150-163, Annual #6 and Super-Villain Team-Up #9	June 2016	N/A	328	No	978-0-7851-9543-6		1976-77	Gerry Conway
234	Bronze	Ms. Marvel Vol. 2	Ms. Marvel #15-23, The Avengers #200, Annual #10, and material from Marvel Super Heroes (1990) #10-11, The Avengers #197-199 and Marvel Fanfare #24	July 2016	N/A	328	No	978-0-7851-9576-4		1978-80, 1990	Kelly Sue DeConnick
235	Bronze	The Incredible Hulk Vol. 10	The Incredible Hulk #171-183	Aug. 2016	N/A	272	No	978-0-7851-9596-2		1974-75	Roy Thomas, Len Wein
236	Bronze	The Fantastic Four Vol. 18	The Fantastic Four #192-203 and Annual #12-13	Sept. 2016	N/A	328	No	978-1-302-90010-6		1978-79	Marv Wolfman
237	Bronze	Black Panther Vol. 2	Black Panther #1-15, Marvel Premiere #51-53 and material from Marvel Team-Up #100	Oct. 2016	N/A	352	No	978-1-302-90020-5		1977-80	Christopher Priest
238	Bronze	Doctor Strange Vol. 7	Doctor Strange #23-37 and material from Chamber of Chills #3-4	Nov. 2016	N/A	304	No	978-1-302-90022-9		1973, 1977–79	Roger Stern
239	Bronze	The Amazing Spider-Man Vol. 18	The Amazing Spider-Man #181-193, The Mighty Marvel Comics Calendar 1978, and material from Annual #12	Dec. 2016	N/A	272	No	978-1-302-90028-1		1978-79	Marv Wolfman
240	Bronze	The Invincible Iron Man Vol. 10	The Invincible Iron Man #68-81	Jan. 2017	N/A	N/A	No	978-1-302-90460-9		1974-75	Mike Friedrich
241	Bronze	The Uncanny X-Men Vol. 10	The Uncanny X-Men #176-188, Magik #1-4 and material from Marvel Fanfare #40	Feb. 2017	N/A	456	No	978-1-302-90461-6		1983-84	Chris Claremont
242	Bronze	Daredevil Vol. 11	Daredevil #108-119 and Marvel Two-In-One #3	March 2017	N/A	264	No	978-1-302-90346-6		1974-75	Mary Skrenes
243	Bronze	Captain America Vol. 9	Captain America #176-192 and material from FOOM #8	April 2017	N/A	352	No	978-1-302-90345-9		1974-75	Steve Englehart
244	Bronze	Doctor Strange Vol. 8	Doctor Strange (1974) #38-46, The Man-Thing (1979) #4, Marvel Fanfare #5, What If? (1977) #18 and material from the Marvel Comics Calendar 1980	May 2017	N/A	296	No	978-1-302-90712-9		1979-81	Chris Claremont
245	Bronze	The Amazing Spider-Man Vol. 19	The Amazing Spider-Man #193-202, Annual #13 and Peter Parker, the Spectacular Spider-Man Annual #1	June 2017	N/A	296	No	978-1-302-90339-8		1979-80	Marv Wolfman
246	Bronze	The Savage She-Hulk Vol. 1	The Savage She-Hulk #1-14	Aug. 2017	N/A	296	No	978-1-302-90354-1		1980-81	David Anthony Kraft
247	Bronze	The Avengers Vol. 17	The Avengers #164-177, Annual #7 and Marvel Two-In-One Annual #2	Aug. 2017	N/A	352	No	978-1-302-90341-1		1977-78	Roger Stern
248	Bronze	Luke Cage, Power Man Vol. 2	Luke Cage, Power Man #17-31	Sept. 2017	N/A	312	No	978-1-302-90343-5		1974-76	Tony Isabella
249	Bronze	Marvel Two-In-One Vol. 2	Marvel Two-In-One #11-20, Annual #1, Marvel Team-Up #47 and Fantastic Four Annual #11	Sept. 2017	N/A	288	No	978-1-302-90352-7		1975-76	Roy Thomas
250	Bronze	The Spectacular Spider-Man Vol. 1	Peter Parker, the Spectacular Spider-Man #1-15	July 2017	N/A	280	No	978-1-302-90356-5		1976-78	Ralph Macchio
251	Bronze	The Mighty Thor Vol. 16	The Mighty Thor #255-266, Annual #6 and Marvel Preview #10	Oct. 2017	N/A	328	No	978-1-302-90358-9		1977	Walter Simonson
252	Bronze	The Incredible Hulk Vol. 11	The Incredible Hulk #184-196	Nov. 2017	N/A	272	No	978-1-302-90349-7		1975-76	Dewey Cassell
253	Bronze	The Fantastic Four Vol. 19	The Fantastic Four #204-218, Annual #14	Dec. 2017	N/A	328	No	978-1-302-90347-3		1979-80	Marv Wolfman
254	Bronze	Daredevil Vol. 12	Daredevil #120-132 and material from FOOM #13	Jan. 2018	N/A	288	No	978-1-302-90968-0		1975-76	Tony Isabella, Marv Wolfman
255	Bronze	The Sub-Mariner Vol. 8	The Sub-Mariner #61-72 and Marvel Spotlight #27	Jan. 2018	N/A	280	No	978-1-302-90962-8		1973-74, 1976	Roy Thomas
256	Bronze	Marvel Two-In-One Vol. 3	Marvel Two-In-One #21-36	March 2018	N/A	304	No	978-1-302-90964-2		1976-78	Ron Wilson
257	Bronze	Ka-Zar Vol. 2	Astonishing Tales (vol. 2) #17-20, Ka-Zar #1-5, Shanna the She-Devil #1-5, Daredevil #110-112, and material from Daredevil #109 and Marvel Two-In-One #3	March 2018	N/A	376	No	978-1-302-90966-6		1972-74	Mike Friedrich, Carole Seuling
258	Bronze	The Avengers Vol. 18	The Avengers #178-188, Annual #8-9, Marvel Premiere #49 and material from Marvel Tales #100	April 2018	N/A	320	No	978-1-302-90960-4		1978-79	David Michelinie
259	Bronze	Marvel Team-Up Vol. 3	Marvel Team-Up #23-30 and Giant-Size Spider-Man #1-3	May 2018	N/A	272	No	978-1-302-90970-3		1974-75	Ron Wilson
260	Bronze	The Defenders Vol. 6	The Defenders #42-57 and material from FOOM #19	May 2018	N/A	336	No	978-1-302-90958-1		1976-78	David Anthony Kraft
261	Bronze	Ant-Man/Giant-Man Vol. 3	Marvel Feature #4-10, Luke Cage, Power Man #24-25, Black Goliath #1-5, The Champions #11-13, Marvel Premiere #47-48 and material from The Invincible Iron Man #44	June 2018	N/A	376	No	978-1-302-91079-2		1972-73, 1975-77, 1979	Mike Friedrich, Tony Isabella, David Michelinie
262	Bronze	Captain America Vol. 10	Captain America #193-200, Annual #3, Marvel Treasury Special: Bicentennial Battles #1 and material from FOOM #11	July 2018	N/A	312	No	978-1-302-90956-7		1976	Jon B. Cooke
263	Bronze	The Incredible Hulk Vol. 12	The Incredible Hulk #197-209 and Annual #5	Aug. 2018	N/A	288	No	978-1-302-91029-7		1976-77	Sal Buscema
264	Bronze	The Fantastic Four Vol. 20	The Fantastic Four #219-231 and Annual #15	Sept. 2018	N/A	320	No	978-1-302-91027-3		1980-81	Doug Moench
265	Bronze	Killraven Vol. 1	Amazing Adventures #18-39 and Marvel Graphic Novel No. 7 - Killraven: Warrior of the Worlds	Sept. 2018	N/A	488	No	978-1-302-91135-5		1973-76, 1983	Don McGregor
266	Bronze	The Invincible Iron Man Vol. 11	The Invincible Iron Man #82-94 and Annual #3-4	Oct. 2018	N/A	328	No	978-1-302-91090-7		1976-77	Bruce Canwell
267	Bronze	The Mighty Thor Vol. 17	The Mighty Thor #267-278 and Marvel Preview #10	Nov. 2018	N/A	320	No	978-1-302-90972-7		1978, 1977	Roy Thomas
268	Bronze	The Amazing Spider-Man Vol. 20	The Amazing Spider-Man #203-212 and Annual #14	Dec. 2018	N/A	264	No	978-1-302-91025-9		1980-81	Denny O'Neill
269	Bronze	Marvel Team-Up Vol. 4	Marvel Team-Up #31-40 and Giant-Size Spider-Man #4-5	Jan. 2019	N/A	296	No	978-1-302-91520-9		1975	Ralph Macchio
270	Bronze	The Uncanny X-Men Vol. 11	The Uncanny X-Men #189-193, Annual #8, Kitty Pryde and Wolverine #1-6 and X-Men/Alpha Flight #1-2	Jan. 2019	N/A	472	No	978-1-302-91518-6		1984-85	Chris Claremont
271	Bronze	Luke Cage, Power Man Vol. 3	Luke Cage, Power Man #32-47 and Annual #1	Feb. 2019	N/A	312	No	978-1-302-91636-7		1976-77	Don McGregor
272	Bronze	Daredevil Vol. 13	Daredevil #133-143, Annual #4, Ghost Rider #20, Marvel Premiere #39-40 and material from Ghost Rider #19	March 2019	N/A	312	No	978-1-302-91664-0		1976-77	Marv Wolfman
273	Bronze	The Avengers Vol. 19	The Avengers #189-202, Marvel Premiere #55 and Tales to Astonish (1979) #12	April 2019	N/A	328	No	978-1-302-91662-6		1979-80	David Michelinie
274	Bronze	The Savage She-Hulk Vol. 2	The Savage She-Hulk #15−25 and Marvel Two-In-One #88	May 2019	N/A	296	No	978-1-302-91718-0		1981−82	David Anthony Kraft
275	Bronze	The Invincible Iron Man Vol. 12	The Invincible Iron Man #95–112	May 2019	N/A	344	No	978-1-302-91716-6		1977-78	Kurt Busiek
276	Bronze	The Spectacular Spider-Man Vol. 2	Peter Parker, the Spectacular Spider-Man #16-31	June 2019	N/A	312	No	978-1-302-91739-5		1978-79	Marc Guggenheim
277	Bronze	Captain America Vol. 11	Captain America #201-214 and Annual #4	July 2019	N/A	304	No	978-1-302-91702-9		1976-77	Mark Waid
278	Bronze	Marvel Two-In-One Vol. 4	Marvel Two-In-One #37-46, Annual #2-3 and Avengers Annual #7	Aug. 2019	N/A	304	No	978-1-302-91815-6		1978	Roger Stern
279	Bronze	The Incredible Hulk Vol. 13	The Incredible Hulk #210-222 and Annual #6	Sept. 2019	N/A	288	No	978-1-302-91926-9		1977-78	Roger Stern
280	Bronze	The Mighty Thor Vol. 18	The Mighty Thor #279-290 and Annual #7-8	Sept. 2019	N/A	312	No	978-1-302-91821-7		1979	Roy Thomas
281	Bronze	Ghost Rider Vol. 1	Marvel Spotlight #5-12, Ghost Rider #1-5 and Marvel Team-Up #15	Oct. 2019	N/A	328	No	978-1-302-91817-0		1972-74	Roy Thomas
282	Bronze	Doctor Strange Vol. 9	Doctor Strange #47-57 and material from Marvel Fanfare #6, Crazy Magazine #88 and The Official Handbook of the Marvel Universe	Oct. 2019	N/A	336	No	978-1-302-91704-3		1981-83	Roger Stern
283	Bronze	The Amazing Spider-Man Vol. 21	The Amazing Spider-Man #213-223 and Annual #15	Nov. 2019	N/A	312	No	978-1-302-91700-5		1981	Dennis O'Neil
284	Bronze	The Fantastic Four Vol. 21	Fantastic Four #232-240, Annual #16 and Fantastic Four: Roast	Dec. 2019	N/A	352	No	978-1-302-91819-4		1981-82	John Byrne
285	Bronze	Daredevil Vol. 14	Daredevil #144-158 and Marvel Premiere #43	Jan. 2020	N/A	320	No	978-1-302-92163-7		1977-79	Roger McKenzie
286	Bronze	The Mighty Thor Vol. 19	The Mighty Thor #291-302 and material from Marvel Treasury #26 and 28	Jan. 2020	N/A	288	No	978-1-302-92234-4		1980-81	Roy Thomas, Ralph Macchio
287	Modern	The Uncanny X-Men Vol. 12	The Uncanny X-Men #194-200, Annual #9, New Mutants Special Edition #1, Nightcrawler #1-4 and material from Bizarre Adventures #27	Feb. 2020	N/A	472	No	978-1-302-92238-2		1985-86, 1981	Chris Claremont
288	Bronze	Dazzler Vol. 1	The Uncanny X-Men #130-131, Amazing Spider-Man #203 and Dazzler #1-13	March 2020	N/A	368	No	978-1-302-92212-2		1980-82	Danny Fingeroth
289	Bronze	The Avengers Vol. 20	Avengers #203-216, Annual #10 and material from Marvel Super-Action #35-37	June 2020	N/A	384	No	978-1-302-92224-5		1981-82	Jim Salicrup
290	Bronze	The Spectacular Spider-Man Vol. 3	Peter Parker, the Spectacular Spider-Man #32-42, Annual #1, Amazing Spider-Man Annual #13 and Fantastic Four #218	July 2020	N/A	312	No	978-1-302-92236-8		1979-80	Jo Duffy
291	Bronze	Marvel Team-Up Vol. 5	Marvel Team-Up #41-52, Marvel Two-In-One #17, The Mighty Marvel Bicentennial Calendar 1976 and material from Marvel Treasury #9 and 13	Aug. 2020	N/A	304	No	978-1-302-92218-4		1975-76	Bruce Canwell
292	Bronze	The Fantastic Four Vol. 22	The Fantastic Four #241-250, What If? #36, Silver Surfer #1 and material from Marvel Fanfare #2	Aug. 2020	N/A	360	No	978-1-302-92228-3		1982-83	Jim Salicrup
293	Bronze	The Amazing Spider-Man Vol. 22	The Amazing Spider-Man #224-237, Annual #16, The Marvel Comics Guide to Collecting Comics 1982 and material from The Official Handbook of the Marvel Universe	Sept. 2020	N/A	448	No	978-1-302-92222-1		1982-83	Roger Stern
294	Bronze	The Incredible Hulk Vol. 14	The Incredible Hulk #223-233, Annual #7, Captain America #230, Marvel Comics Calendar 1979 and material from Marvel Treasury #17	Sept. 2020	N/A	296	No	978-1-302-92230-6		1978-79	Roger Stern
295	Bronze	The Defenders Vol. 7	The Defenders #58-75 and material from Marvel Treasury #16	Nov. 2020	N/A	352	No	978-1-302-92226-9		1978-79	Jo Duffy
296	Bronze	Marvel Two-In-One Vol. 5	Marvel Two-In-One #47-60 and Annual #4	Dec. 2020	N/A	320	No	978-1-302-92220-7		1979-80	Ralph Macchio
297	Bronze	Ghost Rider Vol. 2	Ghost Rider #6-20, Daredevil #138 and Marvel Two-In-One #8	Dec. 2020	N/A	328	No	978-1-302-92214-6		1974-75	Tony Isabella
298	Bronze	Captain America Vol. 12	Captain America #215-230 and Incredible Hulk #232	Jan. 2021	N/A	312	No	978-1-302-92210-8		1977-79	Don Glut
299	Bronze	Spider-Woman Vol. 2	Spider-Woman #9-25	Feb. 2021	N/A	328	No	978-1-302-92736-3		1978-80	Steven Grant
300	Bronze	Howard the Duck Vol. 1	Howard the Duck #1-14, Marvel Treasury Edition #12 and material from Fear #19, Man-Thing #1, Giant-Size Man-Thing #4-5 and FOOM #15	March 2021	N/A	376	No	978-1-302-92216-0		1974-77	Stuart Moore
301	Bronze	The Invincible Iron Man Vol. 13	The Invincible Iron Man #113-128 and Marvel Premiere #44	March 2021	N/A	360	No	978-1-302-92232-0		1978-79	David Michelinie
302	Bronze	Dazzler Vol. 2	Dazzler #14-25 and material from What If? #33	March 2021	N/A	328	No	978-1-302-92867-4		1982-83	Danny Fingeroth
303	Modern	Black Panther Vol. 3	Black Panther #1-4 and material from Marvel Comics Presents #13-37	April 2021	N/A	400	No	978-1-302-92869-8		1988-90	Peter B. Gillis, Don McGregor
304	Bronze	The Mighty Thor Vol. 20	The Mighty Thor #303-314 and Annual #9	April 2021	N/A	336	No	978-1-302-92871-1		1981	Ralph Macchio
305	Bronze	Brother Voodoo Vol. 1	Strange Tales #169-173, Marvel Team-Up #24, Werewolf by Night #39-41, Marvel Two-In-One #41, Doctor Strange #48, Moon Knight #21, and material from Tales of the Zombie #6 & 10, Tomb of Dracula #34-37, Werewolf by Night #38, Marvel Super-Heroes #1, and Doctor Strange: Sorcerer Supreme #16-17 & 20	May 2021	N/A	344	No	978-1-302-92923-7		1973-76, 1978, 1981, 1982, 1990	Ron Wilson
306	Bronze	The Incredible Hulk Vol. 15	The Incredible Hulk #234-244 and Annual #8-9	May 2021	N/A	296	No	978-1-302-92939-8		1979-80	Roger Stern
307	Bronze	Daredevil Vol. 15	Daredevil #159-172 and material from Bizarre Adventures #25	June 2021	N/A	368	No	978-1-302-92927-5		1979-81	Charles Soule
308	Modern	The Uncanny X-Men Vol. 13	The Uncanny X-Men #201-209, Longshot #1-6 and material from Marvel Fanfare #33	June 2021	N/A	496	No	978-1-302-92945-9		1986-87	Chris Claremont
309	Bronze	Captain America Vol. 13	Captain America #231-246 and Marvel Premiere #49	July 2021	N/A	328	No	978-1-302-92925-1		1979-80	Jim Salicrup
310	Bronze	The Avengers Vol. 21	The Avengers #217-226, Annual #11, The Vision and The Scarlet Witch #1-4 and material from Marvel Fanfare #3	Aug. 2021	N/A	392	No	978-1-302-92935-0		1982	Jim Salicrup
311	Bronze	Marvel Team-Up Vol. 6	Marvel Team-Up #53-64, Annual #1, Marvel Premiere #31 and Marvel Comics Memory Album Calendar 1977	Aug. 2021	N/A	320	No	978-1-302-92931-2		1977	Chris Claremont
312	Bronze	The Spectacular Spider-Man Vol. 4	Peter Parker, the Spectacular Spider-Man #43-55 and Annual #2	Sept. 2021	N/A	328	No	978-1-302-92943-5		1980-81	Roger Stern
313	Bronze	Ghost Rider Vol. 3	Ghost Rider #21-35 and Marvel Premiere #28	Oct. 2021	N/A	312	No	978-1-302-92929-9		1975-79	Ralph Macchio
314	Bronze	The Tomb of Dracula Vol. 1	The Tomb of Dracula #1-11 and material from Dracula Lives! #1-2	Oct. 2021	N/A	320	No	978-1-302-92947-3		1972-73	Gerry Conway, Marv Wolfman
315	Bronze	The Amazing Spider-Man Vol. 23	The Amazing Spider-Man #238-251, Annual #17 and Peter Parker, the Spectacular Spider-Man #85	Nov. 2021	N/A	472	No	978-1-302-92933-6		1983-84	Roger Stern
316	Bronze	The Invincible Iron Man Vol. 14	The Invincible Iron Man #129-144	Dec. 2021	N/A	336	No	978-1-302-92941-1		1979-81	David Michelinie
317	Bronze	The Fantastic Four Vol. 23	The Fantastic Four #251-257, Annual #17, The Avengers #233 and The Thing #2	Dec. 2021	N/A	344	No	978-1-302-92937-4		1983	John Byrne
318	Bronze	Marvel Two-In-One Vol. 06	Marvel Two-In-One #61-74	Jan. 2022	N/A	304	No	978-1-302-93293-0		1980-81	Ralph Macchio
319	Bronze	Doctor Strange Vol. 10	Doctor Strange #58-73	Feb. 2022	N/A	400	No	978-1-302-93320-3		1983-85	Roger Stern
320	Modern	The Uncanny X-Men Vol. 14	Uncanny X-Men #210-219, Annual #10, New Mutants Annual #2 and Fantastic Four vs. X-Men #1-4	Mar. 2022	N/A	496	No	978-1-302-93344-9		1986-87	Chris Claremont
321	Bronze	The Defenders Vol. 8	Defenders #76-91, Material from Tales to Astonish #13	Mar. 2022	N/A	328	No	978-1-302-93330-2		1979-81	Jo Duffy
322	Bronze	The Mighty Thor Vol. 21	The Mighty Thor #315-327, Annual #10 and Material from Bizarre Adventures #32	Apr. 2022	N/A	376	No	978-1-302-93338-8		1982-83	Jim Salicrup
323	Bronze	Dazzler Vol. 3	Dazzler #26-34 and Marvel Graphic Novel #12	Apr. 2022	N/A	304	No	978-1-302-93318-0		1983-84	Ralph Macchio
324	Bronze	The Avengers Vol. 22	The Avengers #227-235, Annual #12, The Amazing Spider-Man Annual #16, Doctor Strange #60, Fantastic Four #256 and part of #257.	May 2022	N/A	352	No	978-1-302-93328-9		1983	Roger Stern
325	Bronze	Daredevil Vol. 16	Daredevil #173-181, What If #28 and #35, Bizarre Adventures #28 and Marvel Fanfare #1.	June 2022	N/A	344	No	978-1-302-93316-6		1982-83	Klaus Janson
326	Bronze	The Spectacular Spider-Man Vol. 5	Peter Parker, the Spectacular Spider-Man #56-66 and Annual #3	June 2022	N/A	352	No	978-1-302-93340-1		1981-82	Roger Stern
327	Bronze	Captain America Vol. 14	Captain America #247-260	July 2022	N/A	328	No	978-1-302-93314-2		1980-81	Roger Stern
328	Bronze	Werewolf by Night Vol. 1	Marvel Spotlight #2-4, Werewolf by Night #1-8 and Marvel Team-Up #12.	September 2022	N/A	280	No	978-1-302-93346-3		1972-73	Roy Thomas
329	Bronze	The Incredible Hulk Vol. 16	The Incredible Hulk #245-255 and Marvel Treasury Edition #25.	October 2022	N/A	280	No	978-1-302-93334-0		1980-81	Jo Duffy
330	Bronze	The Fantastic Four Vol. 24	The Fantastic Four #258-268, Alpha Flight (1983) #4 and The Thing (1983) #10; material from Fantastic Four Special Edition (1984) #1, The Thing (1983) #7 and Marvel Fanfare #15.	November 2022	N/A	376	No	978-1-302-93332-6		1984	Michael Higgins
331	Bronze	Ghost Rider Vol. 4	Ghost Rider #36-50	November 2022	N/A	304	No	978-1-302-93322-7		1979-80	Jim Salicrup
332	Bronze	The Tomb of Dracula Vol. 2	The Tomb of Dracula #12-22, Werewolf by Night #15, Giant-Size Spider-Man #1 and material from Dracula Lives! #4, 6	November 2022	N/A	296	No	978-1-302-93342-5		1973-74	Marv Wolfman
333	Bronze	The Invincible Iron Man Vol. 15	The Invincible Iron Man #145-157	December 2022	N/A	344	No	978-1-302-93336-4		1981-82	David Michelinie
334	Modern	The Amazing Spider-Man Vol. 24	The Amazing Spider-Man #252-262 and Annual #18	December 2022	N/A	336	No	978-1-302-93326-5		1984-85	Danny Fingeroth
335	Bronze	Spider-Woman Vol. 3	Spider-Woman #26-38	December 2022	N/A	288	No	978-1-302-94669-2		1980-81	Chris Claremont
336	Bronze	Ka-Zar Vol. 3	Ka-Zar #6-9 and material from Savage Tales #6-11	January 2023	N/A	368	No	978-1-302-94918-1		1974-75	Roy Thomas
337	Bronze	The Invincible Iron Man Vol. 16	The Invincible Iron Man #158-170, Annual #5 and material from Marvel Fanfare #4	February 2023	N/A	360	No	978-1-302-94920-4		1982-83	Luke McDonnell
339	Modern	Dazzler Vol. 4	Dazzler #35-42; Beauty and the Beast #1-4; Secret Wars II #4 and material from Marvel Fanfare #38	March 2023	N/A	344	No	978-1-302-94923-5		1985-86	Michael Higgins
338	Modern	The Uncanny X-Men Vol. 15	Uncanny X-Men #220-231, Annual #11, X-men vs. Avengers #1-4 and material from Best of Marvel Comics (1987)	March 2023	N/A	520	No	978-1-302-94922-8		1987-88	Chris Claremont
340	Bronze	Daredevil Vol. 17	Daredevil #182-191, material from Elektra Saga (1984) #1-4 and The Official Handbook of the Marvel Universe (1983).	April 2023	N/A	368	No	978-1-302-94925-9		1982-83	Ralph Macchio
341	Bronze	Howard the Duck Vol. 2	Howard the Duck #15-31 and Annual #1	May 2023	N/A	376	No	978-1-302-94927-3		1977-79	Val Mayerik
342	Bronze	The Avengers Vol. 23	The Avengers #236-245, Annual #13 and Hawkeye #1-4.	May 2023	N/A	392	No	978-1-302-94930-3		1983-84	Roger Stern
343	Bronze	The Spectacular Spider-Man Vol. 6	Peter Parker, the Spectacular Spider-Man #67-79	June 2023	N/A	336	No	978-1-302-94932-7		1982-83	Ralph Macchio
344	Bronze	Captain America Vol. 15	Captain America #261-269, Annual #5 and Defenders #106	June 2023	N/A	288	No	978-1-302-94933-4		1981-82	J.M. DeMatteis
345	Bronze	Ghost Rider Vol. 5	Ghost Rider #51-62	July 2023	N/A	296	No	978-1-302-94935-8		1980-81	Ralph Macchio
346	Bronze	The Incredible Hulk Vol. 17	The Incredible Hulk #256-265, Annual #10-11 and Contest of Champions #1-3.	Aug. 2023	N/A	400	No	978-1-302-94937-2		1981	Steven Grant
347	Bronze	The Fantastic Four Vol. 25	The Fantastic Four #269-277, Annual #18, The Thing (1983) #19, 23 and material from Epic Illustrated (1980) #26-34.	Aug. 2023	N/A	376	No	978-1-302-94939-6		1984-85	Michael Higgins
348	Bronze	The Mighty Thor Vol. 22	The Mighty Thor #328-336, Annual #11, Marvel Graphic Novel #33 and Material from The Official Handbook of the Marvel Universe (1983)	Sept. 2023	N/A	368	No	978-1-302-94941-9		1983	Alan Zelenetz
349	Bronze	The Tomb of Dracula Vol. 3	The Tomb of Dracula #23-30, Giant-Size Chillers #01, Giant-Size Dracula #02-03 and the Lilith stories from Vampire Tales #6, Dracula Lives! #10-11 and Marvel Preview #12 and #16	Oct. 2023	N/A	368	No	978-1-302-94944-0		1974-75	Stephen Graham Jones
350	Bronze	Omega the Unknown Vol. 1	Omega the Unknown #1-10 and The Defenders #76-77	Nov. 2023	N/A	240	No	978-1-302-94945-7		1975-76	Mary Skrenes
351	Bronze	Werewolf by Night Vol. 2	Werewolf by Night #9-21, The Tomb of Dracula #18, Giant-Size Creatures #01 and material from Monsters Unleashed #06-07	Nov. 2023	N/A	344	No	978-1302949488		1973-74	Duane Swierczynski
352	Modern	The Amazing Spider-Man Vol. 25	The Amazing Spider-Man #263-270, Annual #19, Web of Spider-Man #01 and #06 and material from The Official Marvel Index to the Amazing Spider-Man #01-09	Dec. 2023	N/A	320	No	978-1-302-94949-5		1985	Christopher Priest
353	Bronze	Marvel Team-Up Vol. 7	Marvel Team-Up #65-77	Dec. 2023	N/A	304	No	978-1302933241		1978-1979	Chris Claremont
354	Bronze	Daredevil Vol. 18	Daredevil 192-203 and material from Marvel Fanfare #7, 10–13	Jan. 2024	N/A	392	No	978-1-302-95316-4		1983-1984	Ralph Macchio
355	Bronze	The Invincible Iron Man Vol. 17	The Invincible Iron Man #171-182, Annual #6 and material from The Official Handbook of the Marvel Universe (1983)	Feb. 2024	N/A	352	No	978-1-302-95507-6		1983-84	Luke McDonnell
356	Bronze	Marvel Two-In-One Vol. 7	Marvel Two-In-One #75-82 and Annual #5-6	Feb. 2024	N/A	296	No	978-1-302-95509-0		1981	Jim Salicrup
357	Bronze	Spider-Woman Vol. 4	Spider-Woman #39-50, The Avengers #240-241 and Avengers Annual #10	March 2024	N/A	400	No	978-1-302-95511-3		1981 - 1983	Chris Claremont
358	Modern	The Uncanny X-Men Vol. 16	Uncanny X-Men #232-243, Annual #12 and X-Factor #37-39	March 2024	N/A	504	No	978-1-302-95515-1		1988 - 1989	Chris Claremont
359	Bronze	Captain America Vol. 16	Captain America #270-280, Annual #6 and material from Marvel Fanfare #5	April 2024	N/A	328	No	978-1-302-95521-2		1982 - 1983	J.M. DeMatteis
360	Modern	Amazing Spider-Man Vol. 26	The Amazing Spider-Man #271-278, Peter Parker, the Spectacular Spider-Man #111, Marvel Graphic Novel #22 - Hooky and material from Marvel Fanfare #27	May 2024	N/A	336	No	978-1-302-95524-3		1985 - 1986	Christopher Priest
361	Bronze	The Incredible Hulk Vol. 18	The Incredible Hulk #266-279 and material from Marvel Fanfare #7	May 2024	N/A	376	No	978-1-302-95527-4		1981 - 1983	Al Ewing
362	Bronze	The Spectacular Spider-Man Vol. 7	Peter Parker, the Spectacular Spider-Man #80-91	June 2024	N/A	336	No	978-1-302-95529-8		1983 - 1984	Ralph Macchio
363	Bronze	The Avengers Vol. 24	The Avengers #246-254, Avengers West Coast (1984) #1-4 and Iron Man Annual #7	July 2024	N/A	392	No	978-1-302-95532-8		1984 - 1985	Roger Stern
364	Bronze	Defenders Vol. 9	Defenders #92-102 and Marvel Team-Up #101	July 2024	N/A	312	No	978-1-302-95534-2		1981	J.M. DeMatteis
365	Modern	The Fantastic Four Vol. 26	The Fantastic Four #278-285 and Annual #19, Avengers Annual #14, Marvel Graphic Novel #18: The Sensational She-Hulk and material from Secret Wars II #2	Aug. 2024	N/A	384	No	978-1-302-95537-3		1985	Michael Higgins
366	Bronze	Ghost Rider Vol. 6	Ghost Rider #63-73, Avengers #214	Sept. 2024	N/A	304	No	978-1-302-95542-7		1981-1982	Bob Budiansky, Roger Stern
367	Bronze	The Tomb of Dracula Vol. 4	The Tomb of Dracula #31-40, Giant-Size Dracula #4-5; material from Vampire Tales #8-9; Marvel Preview #3, 8	Oct. 2024	N/A	392	No	978-1-302-95545-8		1975-1976	Glenn Greenberg
368	Bronze	The Man-Thing Vol. 1	Astonishing Tales #12-13, Fear #11-19, Man-Thing #1, Marvel Two-In-One #1; material from Savage Tales #1, Fear #10	Oct. 2024	N/A	304	No	978-1-302-95547-2		1971-1974	Steve Orlando
369	Bronze	Werewolf by Night Vol. 3	Werewolf by Night #22-30, Giant-Size Werewolf #2-5	Nov. 2024	N/A	328	No	978-1-302-95550-2		1974-1975	Doug Moench
370	Bronze	The Mighty Thor Vol. 23	The Mighty Thor #337-348, Annual #12, material from Marvel Fanfare #13	Dec. 2024	N/A	368	No	978-1-302-95555-7		1983-1984	Walter Simonson
371	Bronze	Marvel Team-Up Vol. 8	Marvel Team-Up #78, 80–90, Annual #2	Dec. 2024	N/A	296	No	978-1-302-95557-1		1978-1980	Ralph Macchio
372	Bronze	Ka-Zar Vol. 4	Ka-Zar #10-20, The X-Men #115-116; material from Rampaging Hulk #9, Marvel Fanfare #56-59	Jan. 2025	N/A	368	No	978-1-302-95560-1		1975-1978, 1991	Val Mayerik
373	Modern	Doctor Strange Vol. 11	Doctor Strange #74-81, Marvel Graphic Novel #23; material from Strange Tales (1987) #1-3; Marvel Fanfare #8, 31	Jan. 2025	N/A	344	No	978-1-302-95562-5		1985-1987	Carl Potts
374	Bronze	The Invincible Iron Man Vol. 18	The Invincible Iron Man #183-192, Annual #7, Marvel Team-Up #134 and Jack of Hearts #1-4	February 2025	N/A	416	No	978-1-302-96215-9		1984-1985	Luke McDonnell
375	Bronze	Avengers West Coast Vol. 1	West Coast Avengers #1-7, Vision and Scarlet Witch #1-2, Marvel Graphic Novel #27 and Wonder Man #1	April 2025	N/A	384	No	978-1-302-96219-7		1984-1987	Michael Higgins
376	Bronze	The Vision and the Scarlet Witch Vol. 1	Vision and Scarlet Witch #1-12, West Coast Avengers #2, Marvel Super-Heroes #10, Marvel Fanfare #6, #14, #32, #48 and #58 & Solo Avengers #5	March 2025	N/A	488	No	978-1-302-96221-0		1985-1986	Jim Salicrup
377	Bronze	The Spectacular Spider-Man Vol. 8	Peter Parker, the Spectacular Spider-Man #92-100, Annual #4, Web of Spider-Man #01 and Questprobe #2	May 2025	N/A	336	No	978-1-302-96223-4		1984-1985	Ralph Macchio
378	Bronze	Daredevil Vol. 19	Daredevil #204-214	May 2025	N/A	296	No	978-1-302-96229-6		1984-1985	Michael Higgins
379	Bronze	The Avengers Vol. 25	The Avengers #255-263, Annual #14, Marvel Graphic Novel #27 & Fantastic Four #286	May 2025	N/A	368	No	978-1-302-96231-9		1985-1986	Roger Stern
380	Bronze	The Fantastic Four Vol. 27	The Fantastic Four #286-296	June 2025	N/A	392	No	978-1-302-96235-7		1985-1986	Michael Higgins
381	Bronze	Captain America Vol. 17	Captain America #281-289, Annual #7 & The Falcon #1-4	July 2025	N/A	368	No	978-1-302-96237-1		1983-1984	J.M. DeMatteis
382	Bronze	The Incredible Hulk Vol. 19	The Incredible Hulk #280-291 & Annual #12	July 2025	N/A	360	No	978-1-302-96239-5		1983-1984	Al Ewing
383	Bronze	Marvel Two-In-One Vol. 8	Marvel Two-In-One #83-93	Aug. 2025	N/A	272	No	978-1-302-96245-6		1982	Jim Salicrup
384	Modern	The Uncanny X-Men Vol. 17	Uncanny X-Men #244-255, Annual #13 and material from Classic X-Men #39 and "What the...?!" #1-5	Sept. 2025	N/A	432	No	978-1-302-96249-4		1989	Chris Claremont
385	Bronze	The Man-Thing Vol. 2	Man-Thing #2-14, Giant-Size Man-Thing #1-2, material from Monsters Unleashed #5, #8-9	Sept. 2025	N/A	360	No	978-1-302-96251-7		1974-1975	J.M. DeMatteis
386	Bronze	The Tomb of Dracula Vol. 5	The Tomb of Dracula #41-55 and Doctor Strange #14	Oct. 2025	N/A	328	No	978-1-302-96255-5		1976-1977	Tom Palmer Jr.
387	Bronze	Ghost Rider Vol. 7	Ghost Rider #74-81, Marvel Super Heroes (1990) #11, Defenders #145 and material from What If? #28 and Defenders #146	Nov. 2025	N/A	304	No	978-1-302-96261-6		1982-1983	J.M. DeMatteis
388	Bronze	The Mighty Thor Vol. 24	Thor #349-359, Annual #13 and Marvel Graphic Novel #15	Nov. 2025	N/A	392	No	978-1-302-96263-0		1984-1985	Walter Simonson
389	Modern	The Amazing Spider-Man Vol. 27	The Amazing Spider-Man #279-288, Annual #20 and material from Marvel Tales #198	Dec. 2025	N/A	304	No	978-1-302-96269-2		1986-1987	

== Table of Atlas Comics Library ==
Although these are not in the same format as Marvel Masterworks, dimensionally larger (8.8" × 11.7") and using non-reconstructed art, Fantagraphics has treated these much like a direct continuation of the Atlas Era Marvel Masterworks line, beginning in 2023, with Venus picking up where the Marvel Masterworks volume left off and designated as "Vol. 2" right on the cover. Unlike Marvel Masterworks, volume numbers are omitted from series that are collected complete in a single volume.

#	Volume title	Material collected	First Edition	Pages	ISBN	Years covered	Introduction by
1	Adventures Into Terror Vol. 1	Adventures Into Terror #43, 44, (Note: Numbering continues from Joker Comics, then reset.) 3–8	31 Oct 2023	180	978-1-68396-871-9	1950-1951	Dr. Michael J. Vassallo
2	Venus Vol. 2	Venus #10-19	16 Apr 2024	310	978-1-68396-919-8	1950-1952	Dr. Michael J. Vassallo
3	In the Days of the Rockets!	Space Squadron #1-5; Space Worlds #6; Speed Carter, Spaceman 1-6	06 Aug 2024	336	978-1-68396-969-3	1951-1954	Dr. Michael J. Vassallo
4	War Comics Vol. 1	War Comics #1-8	19 Nov 2024	180	978-1-68396-968-6	1950-1952	Dr. Michael J. Vassallo
5	Police Action	Police Action #1-7; Police Badge #479 #5 (Note: One-shot. Numbering continues from Spy Thrillers.)	1 Apr 2025	254	979-8-8750-0005-8	1954-1955	Dr. Michael J. Vassallo
6	Shiver as You Read!	Amazing Detective Cases #11-14; Men’s Adventures #21-26	Announced for 17 Jun 2025; Postponed to 30 Sep 2025	304	979-8-8750-0057-7	1952-1954	Dr. Michael J. Vassallo
7	Girl Comics	Girl Comics #1-12	Announced for 9 Sep 2025; Postponed to 18 Nov 2025	336	979-8-8750-0107-9	1949-1952	Dr. Michael J. Vassallo
8	Snafu	Snafu #1-3	Announced for 4 Nov 2025; Postponed to 2 December 2025	256	979-8-8750-0108-6	1955-1956	Dr. Michael J. Vassallo
9	Adventures Into Weird Worlds	Adventures Into Weird Worlds #1-10	31 Mar 2026	304	979-8-8750-0162-8	1951-1952	Dr. Michael J. Vassallo
10	Sports Action	Sport Stars #1; Sports Action 2-14	30 Jun 2026	416	979-8-8750-0211-3	1949-1952	
11	Spy Cases	Spy Cases #26-28; (Note: Numbering continues from The Kellys, then reset.) #4-19	25 Aug 2026	304	979-8-8750-0235-9	1950-1953	
12	Complete Mystery	Complete Mystery #1-4; True Complete Mystery #5-8	16 Mar 2027	254	979-8-8750-0274-8	1948-1949	

=== Table of Atlas Creator Collection ===
Originally called Atlas Artist Edition, it was changed to Atlas Creator Collection to acknowledge that Bill Everett was both writer and artist. This is a companion series to Atlas Comic Library focused on artists/creators. These are even larger than the Atlas Comics Library series, at 10.1" × 13.8".

#	Volume title	Material collected	First Edition	Pages	ISBN	Years covered	Introduction by
1	Joe Maneely Vol. 1: "The Raving Maniac" and Other Stories		16 Jan 2024	256	978-1-68396-891-7	1950-1958	Dr. Michael J. Vassallo
2	Al Williamson: "The City That Time Forgot" and Other Stories		21 Jan 2025	448	979-8-8750-0006-5	1955-1960	Dr. Michael J. Vassallo
3	Bill Everett Vol. 1: "One Head Too Many!" and Other Weird Horror Stories		11 Nov 2025	256	979-8-8750-0141-3		Dr. Michael J. Vassallo

== Table of Lost Marvels ==
Deluxe hardcovers issued by Fantagraphics in a format similar to the Atlas Comics Library beginning in 2025.

#	Volume title	Material collected	First Edition	Pages	ISBN	Years covered	Introduction by
1	Tower of Shadows	Tower of Shadows #1-9	29 Apr 2025	176	979-8-8750-0037-9	1969-1971	Michael Dean
2	Howard Chaykin Vol. 1: Dominic Fortune/Monark Starstalker/Phantom Eagle	Marvel Premiere #32, 56; Marvel Preview #2; Dominic Fortune #1-4; War Is Hell: The First Flight of the Phantom Eagle #1-5	12 Aug 2025	256	979-8-8750-0036-2	1975; 1976; 1980; 2008–2010	Brannon Costello
3	Savage Tales of the 1980s	Savage Tales (vol. 2) #1-8	Announced for 18 Nov 2025 Postponed to 17 Feb 2026	528	979-8-8750-0139-0	1985-1986	

=== Table of Marvel Creator Collection ===
#	Volume title	Material collected	First Edition	Pages	ISBN	Years covered	Introduction by
1	Back to the Savage Land: Barry Windsor-Smith at Marvel Vol. 1		28 April 2026	352	979-8-8750-0152-9		

== Table of Mighty Marvel Masterworks ==
In 2021 Marvel launched the Mighty Marvel Masterworks line to offer their classic stories in an accessible 6" by 9" format. Like the traditional Marvel Masterworks, each volume has a limited direct market variant with volume numbers for the entire line. The line was discontinued in 2025 with several volumes canceled.

#	Age/ era	Volume title	Material collected	First edition	Pages	ISBN	Years covered
1	Silver	The Amazing Spider-Man Vol. 1 - With Great Power...	Amazing Spider-Man (1963) #1-10 and material from Amazing Fantasy (1962) #15	June 2021	256	978-1-302-92977-0	1962-1964
2	Silver	The Fantastic Four Vol. 1 - The World's Greatest Heroes	Fantastic Four (1961) #1-10	July 2021	256	978-1-302-92979-4	1961-1963
3	Silver	The X-Men Vol. 1 - The Strangest Super Heroes of All	X-Men (1963) #1-10	August 2021	240	978-1-302-92980-0	1963-1965
4	Silver	The Avengers Vol. 1 - The Coming of the Avengers!	Avengers (1963) #1-10	September 2021	240	978-1-302-92978-7	1963-1964
5	Silver	The Mighty Thor Vol. 1 - The Vengeance of Loki	Material from Journey into Mystery (1952) #83-100	October 2021	280	978-1-302-93168-1	1962-1964
6	Silver	The Incredible Hulk Vol. 1 - The Green Goliath	Incredible Hulk (1962) #1-6	November 2021	160	978-1-302-93180-3	1962-1963
7	Silver	The Amazing Spider-Man Vol. 2 - The Sinister Six	Amazing Spider-Man (1963) #11-19, Amazing Spider-Man Annual (1964) #1	December 2021	288	978-1-302-93195-7	1964
8	Silver	The Fantastic Four Vol. 2 - The Micro-World of Doctor Doom	Fantastic Four (1961) #11-20, Fantastic Four Annual (1963) #1	January 2022	296	978-1-302-93436-1	1963
9	Silver	Doctor Strange Vol. 1 - The World Beyond	Material from Strange Tales (1951) #110-111, 114–129	February 2022	176	978-1-302-93438-5	1963-1965
10	Silver	Daredevil Vol. 1 -While the City Sleeps	Daredevil (1964) #1-11	March 2022	248	978-1-302-93440-8	1964-1965
11	Silver	The Mighty Thor Vol. 2 - The Invasion of Asgard	Journey into Mystery (1952) #101-104 (A & C stories), #105-110	April 2022	208	978-1-302-93442-2	1964
12	Silver	The Avengers Vol. 2 - The Old Order Changeth!	Avengers (1963) #11-20	May 2022	216	978-1-302-94613-5	1964-1965
13	Silver	Captain America Vol. 1 -The Sentinel of Liberty	material from Tales of Suspense (1959) #59-77	June 2022	216	978-1-302-94615-9	1964-1966
14	Silver	The Amazing Spider-Man Vol. 3 - The Goblin and the Gangsters	Amazing Spider-Man (1963) #20-28, Amazing Spider-Man Annual (1964) #2	July 2022	224	978-1-302-94617-3	1965
15	Silver	The X-Men Vol. 2 - Where Walks the Juggernaut	X-Men (1963) #11-19	August 2022	200	978-1-302-94619-7	1965-1966
16	Silver	The Incredible Hulk Vol. 2 - The Lair of the Leader	Material from Tales to Astonish (1959) #59-74	September 2022	192	978-1-302-94623-4	1964-1965
17	Silver	The Black Panther Vol. 1 - The Claws of the Panther	Fantastic Four (1961) #52-53, 66; Captain America (1968) #100; Avengers (1963) #52, 62, 73–74; Daredevil (1964) #52 and material from Fantastic Four (1961) #54; Tales of Suspense (1959) #97-99	October 2022	240	978-1-302-94709-5	1966-1970
18	Silver	Namor, The Sub-Mariner Vol. 1 -The Quest Begins	Daredevil (1964) #7, material from Tales to Astonish (1959) #70-80	November 2022	176	978-1-302-94885-6	1965-1966
19	Silver	Doctor Strange Vol. 2- The Eternity War	material from Strange Tales (1951) #130-146, Amazing Spider-Man Annual (1964) #2	January 2023	216	978-1-302-94887-0	1965-1966
20	Silver	Captain Marvel Vol. 1 - The Coming of Captain Marvel	Marvel Super Heroes (1967) #12-13, Captain Marvel (1968) #1-7, material from Not Brand Echh #9	February 2023	200	978-1-302-94889-4	1967-1968
21	Silver	Daredevil Vol. 2 - Alone Against the Underworld	Daredevil (1964) #12-21	March 2023	216	978-1-302-94891-7	1966
22	Silver	The Mighty Thor Vol. 3 - The Trial of the Gods	Journey into Mystery (1952) #110-119	April 2023	232	978-1-302-94893-1	1964-1965
23	Silver	The Avengers Vol. 3 - Among Us Walks a Goliath	Avengers (1963) #21-30	May 2023	216	978-1-302-94895-5	1965-1966
24	Silver	Captain America Vol. 2 - The Red Skull Lives	material from Tales of Suspense (1959) #78-94, Not Brand Echh #3	June 2023	200	978-1-302-94897-9	1966-1967
25	Silver	The Amazing Spider-Man Vol. 4 - The Master Planner	Amazing Spider-Man (1963) #29-38	July 2023	216	978-1-302-94899-3	1965-1966
26	Silver	The Incredible Hulk Vol. 3 - Less than Monster, More than Man	material from Tales to Astonish (1959) #75-91	September 2023	192	978-1-302-94903-7	1966-1967
27	Silver	The X-Men Vol. 3 - Divided We Fall	X-Men (1963) #20-29	October 2023	216	978-1-302-94901-3	1966-1967
28	Silver	The Fantastic Four Vol. 3 - It Started on Yancy Street	Fantastic Four (1961) #21-29	November 2023	216	978-1-302-94907-5	1963-1964
29	Silver	The Silver Surfer Vol. 1 - The Sentinel of the Spaceways	Silver Surfer (1968) #1-4, material from Fantastic Four Annual #5, Not Brand Echh #13	December 2023	192	978-1-302-94909-9	1967-1968
30	Bronze	The Black Panther Vol. 2 - Look Homeward, Avenger	Avengers (1963) #77-79, 87, 112, 126; Daredevil (1964) #69; Astonishing Tales (1970) #6-7; Fantastic Four (1961) #119; Marvel Team-Up (1972) #20	January 2024	216	978-1-302-94905-1	1970-1974
31	Silver	Captain America Vol. 3 - To be Reborn	Tales of Suspense (1959) #95-99, Captain America (1968) #100-105	March 2024	192	978-1-302-95432-1	1967-1968
32	Silver	Daredevil Vol. 3 - Unmasked	Daredevil (1964) #22-32	April 2024	240	978-1-302-95428-4	1966-1967
33	Silver	The Avengers Vol. 4 - The Sign of the Serpent	Avengers (1963) #31-40	August 2024	216	978-1-302-95430-7	1966-1967
34	Silver	The Mighty Thor Vol. 4 - When Meet the Immortals	Journey Into Mystery (1952) #120-125, Annual (1965) #1, Thor (1966) #126-127	September 2024	200	978-1-302-95426-0	1965-1966
35	Silver	The Amazing Spider-Man Vol. 5 - To Become an Avenger	Amazing Spider-Man (1963) #39-46, Annual (1964) #3	November 2024	200	978-1-302-95434-5	1966-1967
36	Silver	The Incredible Hulk Vol. 4 -Let There Be Battle	Tales to Astonish (1959) #100, Incredible Hulk (1968) #102; material from Tales to Astonish (1959) #92-99, 101; Not Brand Echh (1967) #3,9	December 2024	168	978-1-302-95438-3	1967-1968
37	Silver	The Fantastic Four Vol. 4 - The Frightful Four	Fantastic Four (1961) #30-36, Annual (1964) #2	February 2025	208	978-1-302-95436-9	1964-1965
38	Silver	Doctor Strange Vol. 3 - Clea Must Die!	Strange Tales (1951) #147-168	April 2025	256	978-1-302-95440-6	1966-1968
39	Silver	The X-Men Vol. 4 - Factor Three	X-Men (1963) #30-39	June 2025	224	978-1-302-95444-4	1967

== See also ==
- List of comic books on CD/DVD
- Essential Marvel
- Marvel Ultimate Collection, Complete Epic and Epic Collection lines
- Marvel Omnibus
