= Marvel Requirer =

The Marvel Requirer was a free promotional magazine issued by Marvel Comics from 1990 to 1992. It was an 8-page publication which previewed upcoming comics with a newsprint cover. The exception was issue #33 which was actually 16 pages. Eight of these pages contained three origin stories of Spider-Man, Captain America and the Fantastic Four. Each monthly issue contained details of all Marvel comics on sale within a particular month, as well as several articles. This title ran for 34 issues, after which it was replaced by Marvel Spotlight.

== Tabloid Influence ==
The publication was a satire of the National Enquirer tabloid, hence the name Marvel Requirer. The cover had headlines that were similar to the tabloids of the era. Some of the headlines included: "Teenage Vigilantes"; which was a promo for the New Warriors title of 1990, "My Hubby the Human Spider"; a promo for Todd McFarlane's Spider-Man # 1, and "Germ Warfare", which featured an image of the Silver Surfer, who was part of the Lifeform cross-over in various Marvel Annuals during 1990.

== Release Dates ==
- Issues 1-10 March 1990 to December 1990
- Issues 11-22 January 1991 to December 1991
- Issues 23-34 March 1992 to December 1992
