= Frank Giacoia =

American comic book artist

- Giacoia from the 1978 Marvel Comics Calendar
- Born: July 6, 1924
- Died: February 4, 1988 (aged 63)
- Areas: Penciller, Inker
- Pseudonyms: Frank Ray, Phil Zupa, Espoia
- Notable works: The Amazing Spider-Man; Captain America

Frank Giacoia (July 6, 1924 – February 4, 1988) was an American comics artist known primarily as an inker. He sometimes worked under the name Frank Ray, and to a lesser extent Phil Zupa, and the single moniker Espoia, the latter used for collaborations with fellow inker Mike Esposito.

== Biography ==
=== Early life and career ===
Frank Giacoia studied at Manhattan's School of Industrial Art (later the High School of Art and Design) and the Art Students League of New York. He entered the comics industry by penciling the feature "Jack Frost" in U.S.A. Comics #3 (cover-dated Jan. 1942), inked by friend and high school classmate Carmine Infantino — the latter's first art for comics and published by Marvel Comics' 1940s precursor, Timely Comics. His friend and collaborator Carmine Infantino, a classmate at the Art Students League, recalled that

...Frank Giacoia and I were in constant contact. One day in '40 we decided to go up to Timely Comics, which later became Marvel, to see if we could get some work. They gave us a script called 'Jack Frost' and that story became our first published work. Frank did the pencils and I did the inking. Joe Simon was the editor and he offered us both a staff job. Frank quit school and took the job. I wanted desperately to quit school and I told my father that it was a great opportunity. He said, 'No way! You're gonna finish school'.

Later in 1941, Giacoia joined the New York City comic book packager Eisner & Iger, the studio of Golden Age artists Will Eisner and Jerry Iger. His early works include drawing crime comics for Ace Comics, horror for Avon Publishing, and a multitude of characters for National Comics Publications (the primary company that evolved into DC Comics) including the Flash and Batman.

Other companies for which Giacoia did art during the 1940s and 1950s include Crestwood Publications, Dell Comics, Eastern Color Printing, Fawcett Comics, Harvey Comics, Lev Gleason Publications, and Timely Comics, the 1940s predecessor of Marvel Comics. Giacoia and writer Otto Binder introduced the short-lived character Captain Wonder in Kid Komics #1 (Feb. 1943).

=== Later career ===
During the 1960s Silver Age of comic books, Giacoia became best known as a Marvel Comics inker, particularly on Captain America stories penciled by the character's co-creator Jack Kirby. One of the company's preeminent names, he worked on virtually every title at one time or another. Giacoia inked the first appearance of the Punisher in The Amazing Spider-Man #129 (Feb. 1974).

Giacoia also worked on the newspaper comic strip The Amazing Spider-Man (based on the Marvel comic book series of the same name) from 1978–1981, as well as on the strips Flash Gordon, The Incredible Hulk, Johnny Reb and Billy Yank, Sherlock Holmes, and Thorne McBride.

He was credited as the pseudonym "Frankie Ray" for some time. In Fantastic Four #53 (August 1966), his real name was announced in the "Bullpen Bulletins".

== Awards and honors ==
Giacoia was nominated for the Shazam Award for Best Inker (Dramatic Division) in 1974. The 1989 graphic novel The Amazing Spider-Man: Parallel Lives, the back cover of which was inked by Giacoia, is dedicated to his memory.

He posthumously won one of the two annual Inkwell Awards Joe Sinnott Hall of Fame Awards in 2016. The award was received by his great-nephew, Mike Giacoia.

== Critical assessment ==
In its list of "The 20 Greatest Inkers of American Comic Books", historians at the retailer Atlas Comics (no relation to the comics publishers) listed Giacoia at #5:

In comics from 1941, Frank Giacoia's smooth, thick line has been recognizable over a surfeit of outstanding pencillers. Gil Kane (who called him 'an extraordinarily powerful inker'), Carmine Infantino, Gene Colan and Jack Kirby all benefited from his heavy, robust linework which always helped tell the story in a simple, direct way. His collaboration with Kirby on the short-lived newspaper strip Johnny Reb and Billy Yank (which Giacoia created) was superb, as was generally the case when he teamed with 'the King.' Frank worked for many publishers during his 40-odd years in comics: Lev Gleason, Hillman, Timely, DC and of course Marvel (where he sometimes moonlighted under the alias Frankie Ray while still working for DC).

== Bibliography ==
=== Archie Comics ===
- All New Adventures of the Mighty Crusaders #1–2 (1983)
- The Fly #1 (1983)
- Fly-Man #39 (1966)
- Mighty Comics #40, 43 (1966–1967)
- Mighty Crusaders #1–2 (1965–1966)
- Mighty Crusaders vol. 2 #11–12 (1985)
- Thunderbunny #1 (1984)

=== Atlas/Seaboard Comics ===
- Phoenix #4 (1975)

=== DC Comics ===
- Action Comics #425 (1973)
- Adventure Comics #399, 401, 457, 459, 495–496 (1970–1983)
- Adventures of Rex the Wonder Dog #1, 4, 6 (1952)
- All-American Men of War #127 (1952)
- All-American Men of War vol. 2 #10, 26, 51 (1954–1957)
- All-American Western #103–111, 113, 117, 126 (1948–1952)
- All-Flash #31–32 (1947)
- All Star Comics #38, 40–41, 52, 54–57 (1947–1951)
- All-Star Squadron Annual #3 (1984)
- All-Star Western #58–67, 69–70, 96, 99–101, 106 (1951–1959)
- Aquaman #46 (1969)
- Batman #229, 280 (1971–1976)
- Big Town #5–10, 17 (1951–1952)
- Blackhawk #260, 268 (1983–1984)
- Boy Commandos #35 (1949)
- Challengers of the Unknown #71–72 (1969–1970)
- Comic Cavalcade #24 (1947)
- Dale Evans Comics #1 (1948)
- Danger Trail #1–5 (1950–1951)
- Daring New Adventures of Supergirl #7 (1983)
- DC Special Series #7 (1977)
- Detective Comics #206, 403–406, 409, 436, 465, 529 (1954–1983)
- Falling in Love #24–25, 139 (1959–1973)
- The Flash #108, 146, 228, 261, 311 (1959–1982)
- Flash Comics #90, 93–94, 96, 98–99, 104 (1947–1949)
- Gang Busters #8 (1949)
- Girls' Love Stories #15, 63, 116–120, 123, 154 (1952–1970)
- Green Lantern #36–38 (1949)
- Green Lantern vol. 2 #77–78, 155 (1970–1982)
- House of Mystery #190, 196–197, 202 (1971–1972)
- House of Secrets #88 (1970)
- Isis #2 (1976)
- Jimmy Wakely #1–5 (1949–1950)
- Justice League of America #44–45, 200 (1966–1982)
- My Greatest Adventure #7 (1956)
- Mystery in Space #3, 5, 9, 12, 16–18, 30, 40, 50–53 (1951–1959)
- New Adventures of Superboy #49 (1984)
- Our Army at War #1, 20, 23, 26 (1952–1954)
- Our Fighting Forces #28–29 (1957–1958)
- Phantom Stranger #3, 5–6 (1952–1953)
- Romance Trail #1, 4 (1949–1950)
- Secret Hearts #8, 102, 141 (1952–1970)
- Sensation Comics #94, 97–105, 107–109 (1949–1952)
- Sensation Mystery #110–116 (1952–1953)
- Showcase #8, 13–14, 17, 92–93 (1957–1970)
- Sinister House of Secret Love #3 (1972)
- Strange Adventures #8, 11, 15, 20, 30–32, 34, 37–38, 43, 63, 81–82, 86, 97, 101–103 (1951–1959)
- Supergirl #6 (1973)
- Superman #277, 279, 329 (1974–1978)
- The Superman Family #189–190 (1978)
- The Unexpected #115, 119, 123, 128, 131, 133, 145, 190 (1969–1979)
- Unknown Soldier #216 (1978)
- Weird War Tales #123 (1983)
- Western Comics #64–67, 69 (1957–1958)
- The Witching Hour #13, 18 (1971)
- Wonder Woman #214, 307–308 (1974–1983)
- World's Finest Comics #40–41, 52–53, 219, 292, 294 (1949–1983)

=== Dell Comics ===
- Cadet Gray of West Point #1 (1958)

=== Eclipse Comics ===
- Xyr #1 (1987)

=== Marvel Comics ===
- 2001: A Space Odyssey Marvel Treasury Special #1 (1976)
- Adventure into Fear #25–26 (1974–1975)
- Adventures into Weird Worlds #9 (1952)
- Amazing Adventures #10, 13, 15, 20 (1972–1973)
- The Amazing Spider-Man #97–107, 127–131, 133–145, 150, 170, 172, 184, 194, 196, 235–237, 239, 241, Annual #5, 10 (1968–1983)
- Astonishing Tales #5, 7, 11, 20 (1971–1973)
- The Avengers #26–31, 73, 85, 87, 110, 118, Annual #2 (1966–1973)
- Captain America #106, 125–126, 152, 167, 183–185, 193–194, 197–204, 206–209, 256, Annual #3 (1968–1981)
- Captain Marvel #22, 42 (1972–1976)
- Chamber of Darkness #1 (1969)
- Champions #10 (1977)
- Conan the Barbarian #5 (1971)
- Crazy Magazine #77 (1981)
- Daredevil #14–25, 27, 36, 38, 101–102, 112 (1966–1974)
- Defenders #1, 28 (1972–1975)
- Doc Savage #6 (1973)
- Fantastic Four #39, 93, 96–97, 114, 143, 154, Annual #5 (1965–1975)
- Frankenstein #10 (1974)
- Ghost Rider #12 (1975)
- Godzilla #2 (1977)
- Haunt of Horror #3 (1974)
- Howard the Duck #28 (1978)
- The Hulk! #12 (1978)
- The Incredible Hulk #103–104, 152, Annual #6 (1968–1977)
- Iron Man #42, 57–58, 62 (1971–1973)
- Iron Man and Sub-Mariner #1 (1968)
- John Carter, Warlord of Mars #15 (1978)
- Journey into Mystery #115 (1965)
- Journey into Mystery vol. 2 #5 (1973)
- Marvel Feature #1 (1971)
- Marvel Premiere #8, 45 (1973–1978)
- Marvel Super-Heroes #12 (1967)
- Marvel Team-Up #3, 10, 13, 19–22, 25–27, 53, 78 (1972–1979)
- Marvel Two-in-One #4, 44, 98, 100, Annual #3 (1974–1983)
- Moon Knight #8 (1981)
- Ms. Marvel #11 (1977)
- My Love #4–5 (1970)
- Nick Fury, Agent of S.H.I.E.L.D. #2 (1968)
- Not Brand Echh #1–3, 5, 9 (1967–1968)
- Nova #6–12 (1977)
- Power Man #35, 40 (1976–1977)
- Rawhide Kid #47 (1965)
- Sgt. Fury and his Howling Commandos #16, 19–20, 23–24, Annual #1 (1965)
- The Spectacular Spider-Man #2 (1968)
- Star Wars #54 (1981)
- Strange Tales #128–129, 141, 150, 162–163, 165, 171 (1965–1973)
- Sub-Mariner #1–5, 49, 62 (1968–1973)
- Supernatural Thrillers #1 (1972)
- Tales of Suspense #63–64, 67–68, 77–79, 81–82, 84–93, 95–98 (1965–1968)
- Tales to Astonish #66–67, 92–92, 101 (1965–1968)
- Thor #306 (1981)
- Two-Gun Kid #73 (1965)
- U.S.A. Comics #3 (1942)
- What If...? #15, 24, 31 (1979–1982)
- Young Allies #6, 9, 12, 18–20 (1943–1946)

=== Skywald Publications ===
- Nightmare #3 (1971)

=== Standard Comics ===
- Adventures into Darkness #6 (1952)

=== Tower Comics ===
- Dynamo #1 (1966)
- Fight the Enemy #1–3 (1966–1967)
- T.H.U.N.D.E.R. Agents #1–12 (1965–1967)
- Undersea Agent #3 (1966)

Preceded by Jack Abel	"Iron Man" feature in Tales of Suspense inker 1966–1968	Succeeded by Johnny Craig
Preceded by Jim Mooney	The Amazing Spider-Man inker 1973–1975	Succeeded by John Romita Sr.
Preceded by D. Bruce Berry	Captain America inker 1976–1977	Succeeded by Mike Royer
