= Marvel Feature =

Comic book series

- Marvel Feature #1 (December 1971); Cover art by Neal Adams.

Publication information
- Publisher: Marvel Comics
- Schedule: (vol. 1) Bimonthly (vol. 2) Bimonthly
- Format: Ongoing
- Publication date: (vol. 1) December 1971–November 1973 (vol. 2) November 1975–November 1976
- No. of issues: (vol. 1) 12 (vol. 2) 7
- Main character(s): (vol. 1) The Defenders, Ant-Man, and The Thing (vol. 2) Red Sonja

Creative team
- Written by: List: (vol. 1) Mike Friedrich, Roy Thomas, Len Wein (vol. 2) Bruce Jones, Roy Thomas
- Penciller: List: (vol. 1) Ross Andru, Don Heck, P. Craig Russell, Jim Starlin, Herb Trimpe (vol. 2) Dick Giordano, Frank Thorne
- Inker: List: (vol. 1) Dan Adkins, Frank Bolle, Sal Buscema, Frank Chiaramonte, Bill Everett, Frank Giacoia, Jimmy Janes, Joe Sinnott, Herb Trimpe (vol. 2) Terry Austin, Dick Giordano, Frank Thorne

Marvel Feature is a comic book showcase series published by Marvel Comics in the 1970s. It was a tryout book, intended to test the popularity of characters and concepts being considered for their own series. The first volume led to the launch of The Defenders and Marvel Two-in-One, while volume two led to an ongoing Red Sonja series.

== Volume one ==
Marvel Feature was one of three tryout books proposed by Stan Lee after he transitioned from being Marvel Comics' writer and editor to its president and publisher, the others being Marvel Spotlight and Marvel Premiere. The advantage of such tryout books was that they allowed the publisher to assess a feature's popularity without the marketing investment required to launch a new series, and without the blow to the publisher's image with readers if the new series immediately failed.

The first series was published for twelve issues from December 1971 until November 1973. The lead story in Marvel Feature #1, by writer Roy Thomas and artist Ross Andru, featured the first team-up of the Hulk, Doctor Strange, and Namor as the Defenders. The first two issues of Marvel Feature were in the 52-page format, with the remaining pages filled out by a new Doctor Strange solo tale and a Sub-Mariner reprint. The Defenders continued as the stars of Marvel Feature for two more issues and then received their own self-titled series in August 1972.

Ant-Man was the lead of Marvel Feature for issues #4–10, paired with his un-billed female companion, the Wasp, starting with issue #6. Doing an Ant-Man feature was editor Roy Thomas's idea, but he found he did not have the time to write it himself and so turned it over to writer Mike Friedrich and artist Herb Trimpe. The series featured the only comics work of Trimpe's brother, Mike, who inked issue #6 over Herb's pencils. Herb Trimpe explained that Mike was a graphic designer at the time and took on the inking job when his regular work slowed down. Issues #7–10 each featured three separate Ant-Man stories and included art by P. Craig Russell. The final issue also reprinted non-Pym stories from the Tales to Astonish series, all written by Stan Lee.

Marvel Feature #11 featured a battle between the Thing and the Hulk. Issue #12 teamed the Thing and Iron Man and featured an early appearance of Thanos. Both issues were penciled by Jim Starlin. As with The Defenders before it, the concept of teaming the Thing with a different character each issue proved popular enough during its Marvel Feature tryout to justify a regular series, titled Marvel Two-in-One.

The series was cancelled as of issue #12. Though it was successful in its intended role as a popularity gauge (both of the series spun off of Marvel Feature had long runs with generally strong sales), it was unable to sustain a readership of its own.

== Volume two ==
Marvel Feature #1, vol. 2 (November 1975) Cover art by Gil Kane and John Romita Sr.

The second series featured Red Sonja, a supporting character from the ancient fantasy world of Conan the Barbarian. It was published for seven issues from November 1975 until November 1976. Roy Thomas wrote issues #1, #6, and #7, while Bruce Jones scripted the other issues. Except for issue #1, drawn by Dick Giordano, the art for the series was by the creator most associated with Red Sonja, Frank Thorne. The character then received her own self-titled series in January 1977.

== Collected editions ==
- Marvel Masterworks: The Defenders Vol. 1 includes Marvel Feature #1–3, 256 pages, July 2008, ISBN 978-0785130444
- Marvel Masterworks: Doctor Strange Vol. 4 includes Doctor Strange story from Marvel Feature #1, 272 pages, January 2010, ISBN 978-0785134954
- Essential Defenders Volume 1 includes Marvel Feature #1–3, 544 pages, May 2005, ISBN 978-0785115472
- Mighty Marvel Team-Up Thrillers includes Marvel Feature #11, 166 pages, 1983, ISBN 978-0939766604
- Essential Marvel Two-in-One Vol. 1 includes Marvel Feature #11–12, 576 pages, November 2005, ISBN 978-0785117292
- The Superhero Women: Featuring the Fabulous Females of Marvel Comics includes Marvel Feature vol. 2 #4, 254 pages, November 1977, Simon & Schuster, ISBN 978-0671229283
