= Tales of Suspense =

Comic

- Tales of Suspense #1 (January 1959). Cover art by Don Heck

Publication information
- Publisher: Marvel Comics
- Schedule: Monthly
- Format: Ongoing
- Publication date: January 1959 – March 1968 (becomes Captain America)
- No. of issues: 99
- Main character(s): Iron Man; The Watcher; Captain America

Creative team
- Written by: List: Robert Bernstein Larry Lieber Stan Lee
- Penciller(s): List: Jack Kirby Paul Reinman Carl Burgos Steve Ditko Dick Ayers Larry Lieber Don Heck George Tuska Gene Colan
- Inker(s): List: Dick Ayers Chic Stone Mike Esposito Jack Abel Dan Adkins Frank Giacoia Joe Sinnott
- Colorist(s): List: Stan Goldberg

Tales of Suspense is the name of an American comic book anthology series, and two one-shot comics, all published by Marvel Comics. The first, which ran from 1959 to 1968, began as a science-fiction anthology that served as a showcase for such artists as Jack Kirby, Steve Ditko, and Don Heck, then featured superheroes Captain America and Iron Man during the Silver Age of Comic Books before changing its title to Captain America with issue #100 (cover-dated April 1968). Its sister title was Tales to Astonish. Following the launch of Marvel Legacy in 2017, Tales of Suspense was once again resurrected at issue #100, featuring the Winter Soldier and Hawkeye in a story called "The Red Ledger".

== Publication history ==
Reported circulation
Year	Circulation
1960	148,929
1961	184,735
1962	126,140
1963	188,110
1964	207,065
1965	222,060
1966	252,239
1967	257,342

=== Science-fiction anthology ===
Tales of Suspense and its sister publication Tales to Astonish were both launched with a January 1959 cover date. Initially published under Atlas Comics, the 1950s forerunner of Marvel, it fell under the Marvel banner with issue #19 (July 1961), the first with a cover sporting the early "MC" box. It contained science-fiction mystery/suspense stories written primarily by editor-in-chief Stan Lee and his brother, Larry Lieber, with artists including Jack Kirby, Steve Ditko, and Don Heck. Issue #9 (May 1960) introduced Chondu the Mystic as an anthological-story character; he would be reintroduced as a supervillain in the 1970s.

=== Iron Man and the Watcher ===
Issue #39 (March 1963) introduced the superhero Iron Man, created by editor and plotter Lee, Lee’s brother scripter Lieber, and artists Heck and Jack Kirby. He starred in generally 13-page but occasionally 18-page adventures, with the rest of Tales of Suspense devoted to the anthological science fiction and fantasy stories the comic normally ran.

After debuting with bulky gray armor, Iron Man was redesigned with similar but golden armor in his second story (issue #40, April 1963). The first iteration of the modern, sleek red-and-golden armor appeared in #48 (Dec. 1963), drawn by Ditko (though whether he or Kirby, singly or in collaboration, designed it, is uncertain). From #53-58 (May-Oct. 1964), the cover logo was "Tales of Suspense featuring The Power of Iron Man". Two months before the debut of the sorcerer-hero Doctor Strange, Lee, Kirby and scripter Robert Bernstein, under the pseudonym "R. Berns", introduced a same-name criminal scientist and Ph.D., Carl Strange. Making his sole appearance in the Iron Man story "The Stronghold of Dr. Strange" in Tales of Suspense #41 (May 1963), the character gained mental powers in a freak lightning strike. The Mandarin debuted in issue #50 (Feb. 1964) and would become one of Iron Man's major enemies. The Black Widow first appeared in #52 (April 1964) and Hawkeye followed five issues later.

The first Marvel superhero work by future company editor-in-chief Roy Thomas was his scripting the Iron Man story "My Life for Yours" in #73 (Jan. 1966), working from a plot by editor Lee as well as a plot assist from Marvel secretary-receptionist Flo Steinberg.

From #49–58 (Jan.–Oct. 1964), one anthological story each issue acquired a framing sequence and ran as "Tales of the Watcher," narrated by the namesake cosmic witness introduced in The Fantastic Four #13 and used as a Marvel Universe supporting character since. The final "Tales of the Watcher" story introduced veteran artist George Tuska as a Marvel regular. Four years later, Tuska would become one of Iron Man's signature artists.

Tales of Suspense #58 (Oct. 1964). Cover art by Jack Kirby and Chic Stone.

=== Captain America ===
Beginning with issue #59 (Nov. 1964), Iron Man began sharing the now "split book" with Captain America, who had guest-starred in the Iron Man feature the previous issue. Jack Kirby, Captain America's co-creator during the 1940s Golden Age of comic books, had drawn the character as part of the superhero team the Avengers earlier that year, and was now illustrating his hero's solo adventures for the first time since 1941. Issue #63 (March 1965), in which editor-scripter Stan Lee retold Captain America's origin, through #71 (Nov. 1965) featured period stories set during World War II, and co-starred Captain America's Golden Age sidekick, Bucky Barnes. Sharon Carter was introduced in issue #75 (March 1966) and later became a love interest for Captain America. The Red Skull, Captain America's nemesis during World War II, was revived in the present day in issue #79 (July 1966). MODOK first appeared in #94 (Oct. 1967).

Kirby drew all but two stories, for which Gil Kane and John Romita Sr. each filled-in. Several stories were finished by penciler-inker George Tuska over Kirby layouts, with one finished by Romita Sr. and another by penciler Dick Ayers and inker John Tartaglione. Kirby's regular inkers on the series were Frank Giacoia (as "Frank Ray") and Joe Sinnott, though Don Heck and Golden Age Captain America artist Syd Shores inked one story each.

Tales of Suspense became Captain America with #100 (April 1968). Iron Man appeared in the one-shot Iron Man and Sub-Mariner #1 (April 1968), and then debuted in his own title with Iron Man #1 (May 1968).

== Revival ==
A Tales of Suspense one-shot (Jan. 1995) which had a cover with a clear plastic overlay, featured Captain America and Iron Man in a single story written by James Robinson and drawn by Colin MacNeil. Another one-shot, Tales of Suspense: Captain America and Iron Man Commemorative Edition (Feb. 2005) reprinted the previous month's Captain America vol. 5 #1 and Iron Man vol. 4 #1.

== In other media ==
- An episode of The Super Hero Squad Show shares the same name along with the title card being a homage to Tales of Suspense #39 and the bank teller's exclamation "Iron Man! He lives! He walks! He conquers!" referencing the text on the cover itself.
- The two-part episode of Iron Man: Armored Adventures is named after the eponymous comic book series.
- In "The Lady in the Lake", the premiere episode of the second season of Agent Carter, Whitney Frost appears in the movie Tales of Suspense which is a reference to the comic book series where the character first appeared.

== Collected editions ==
- Marvel Masterworks: Atlas Era Tales of Suspense
  - Vol. 1 collects Tales of Suspense #1–10, 272 pages, October 2006, ISBN 978-0785123538
  - Vol. 2 collects Tales of Suspense #11–20, 272 pages, June 2008, ISBN 978-0785129592
  - Vol. 3 collects Tales of Suspense #21–31, 304 pages, August 2010, ISBN 978-0785141945
  - Vol. 4 collects Tales of Suspense #32–48, 50-54, 304 pages, September 2012, ISBN 978-0785158677

=== Iron Man ===
- Son of Origins of Marvel Comics includes Iron Man stories from Tales of Suspense #39 and 97, 249 pages, October 1975, Simon & Schuster, ISBN 978-0671221669
- Marvel Masterworks: The Invincible Iron Man
  - Vol. 1 collects Iron Man stories from Tales of Suspense #39–50, 197 pages, September 1992, ISBN 978-0785111863
  - Vol. 2 collects Iron Man stories from Tales of Suspense #51–65, 240 pages, May 2005, ISBN 978-0785117711
  - Vol. 3 collects Iron Man stories from Tales of Suspense #66–83, 256 pages, August 2006, ISBN 978-0785120674
  - Vol. 4 collects Iron Man stories from Tales of Suspense #84–99, 256 pages, April 2007, ISBN 978-0785126782
- Essential Iron Man
  - Vol. 1 collects Iron Man stories from Tales of Suspense #39–72, 512 pages, September 2000, ISBN 978-0785134640
  - Vol. 2 includes Iron Man stories from Tales of Suspense #73–99, 608 pages, November 2004, ISBN 978-0785114871
- Marvel's Greatest Superhero Battles includes Iron Man stories from Tales of Suspense #79–80, 253 pages, November 1978, Simon & Schuster, ISBN 978-0671243913

=== Watcher ===
- Marvel Masterworks: Marvel Rarities: Vol. 1 collects Watcher stories from Tales of Suspense #49–58, 344 pages, August 2014, ISBN 978-0785188094

=== Captain America ===
- Marvel Masterworks: Captain America
  - Vol. 1 collects Captain America stories from Tales of Suspense #59–81, 272 pages, October 1990, ISBN 978-0785111764
  - Vol. 2 collects Captain America stories from Tales of Suspense #82–99, 240 pages, June 2005, ISBN 978-0785117858
- Essential Captain America Vol. 1 collects Captain America stories from Tales of Suspense #59–99, 528 pages, March 2000, ISBN 978-1439500293
- Captain America: Sentinel of Liberty (1979) includes Captain America stories from Tales of Suspense #59, 63, 79–81 128 pages, October 1979, Simon & Schuster, ISBN 978-0671252328
- Bring on the Bad Guys: Origins of the Marvel Comics Villains includes Captain America stories from Tales of Suspense #66–68, 253 pages, October 1976, Simon & Schuster, ISBN 978-0671223557
- Marvel Epic
  - Vol. 1 Captain America Lives Again collects Captain America stories from Strange Tales #114, Avengers #4, Tales of Suspense #58–96, November 2014 ISBN 978-0785188360
  - Vol. 2 The Coming of...the Falcon collects Captain America stories from Tales of Suspense #97–99, Captain America #100–119 and material from Not Brand Echh #3, 12, September 2016 ISBN 978-1302900076

== See also ==
- Amazing Adventures
- Journey into Mystery
- Strange Tales
- Strange Worlds
- World of Fantasy
- Tales to Astonish
