= Iron Man and Sub-Mariner =

Comic book

- Iron Man and Sub-Mariner #1 (April 1968), cover art by Gene Colan (pencils) & Bill Everett (inks).

Publication information
- Publisher: Marvel Comics
- Format: One-shot
- Publication date: April 1968
- No. of issues: 1

Creative team
- Written by: Archie Goodwin; Roy Thomas
- Penciller(s): Gene Colan
- Inker(s): Johnny Craig; Frank Giacoia
- Editor(s): Stan Lee

Iron Man and Sub-Mariner is a one-shot comic book published by Marvel Comics in 1968. It is notable for being the first Marvel title to be intentionally published for only one issue, as it existed to use up two half-length stories left over after Marvel began its expansion and the characters were to be given their own solo titles.

Iron Man and Sub-Mariner does not feature a team-up of the title characters, nor a complete story for either. The Iron Man tale is continued from Tales of Suspense #99 (cover-dated March 1968) and continues in Iron Man #1 (May 1968). The Sub-Mariner story continues from Tales to Astonish #101 (March 1968), and continues in Sub-Mariner #1 (May 1968). The cover-logo trademark uses "and" while the copyrighted title noted in the postal indicia uses an ampersand.

The stories were: an 11-page Iron Man tale, "The Torrent Without, The Tumult Within", written by Archie Goodwin, with art by penciler Gene Colan and inker Johnny Craig, a former EC Comics mainstay; and an 11-page Sub-Mariner story, "Call Him Destiny, or Call Him Death", written by Roy Thomas, with art by Colan and inker Frank Giacoia. Stan Lee was the editor for both stories. The latter tale retold the Sub-Mariner's origin and introduced the supervillain Destiny.

At least one previous Marvel title had lasted only one issue, though unintentionally. Red Raven Comics #1 (Aug. 1940), from Marvel predecessor company Timely Comics, became The Human Torch with issue #2, dropping all features from the debut issue. The Grand Comics Database notes of the first and only issue, "No blurbs at the end of the stories in this issue indicate that there will be a Red Raven Comics #2. Instead they all advertise either Marvel Mystery Comics or in one case Mystic Comics, suggesting that perhaps Red Raven Comics was cancelled even before it went to press."

== Reprints ==
Iron Man & Sub-Mariner #1 has been reprinted in two Essential Marvel collections, Iron Man vol. 2 (2004, ISBN 0-7851-1487-4) and Sub-Mariner vol. 1 (2009, ISBN 0-7851-3075-6).
