= List of superhero debuts =

A superhero (also known as a "super hero" or "super-hero") is a fictional character "of unprecedented physical prowess dedicated to acts of derring-do in the public interest." Since the debut of Superman in 1938 by Jerry Siegel and Joe Shuster, stories of superheroes — ranging from brief episodic adventures to continuing years-long sagas — have dominated American comic books and crossed over into other media. A female superhero is sometimes called a "superheroine."

By most definitions, characters need not have actual superhuman powers to be deemed superheroes, although sometimes terms such as "costumed crimefighters" are used to refer to those without such powers who have many other common traits of superheroes.

For a list of comic book supervillain debuts, see List of comic book supervillain debuts.

== 1900s ==
Character / Team	Year debuted	Company / publisher	Creator/s	First appearance	Medium
Hugo Hercules	1902 (September 7)	Chicago Tribune	Wilhelm Heinrich Detlev Körner	Hugo Hercules Obliges Beauty in Distress	Newspaper Comics
The Scarlet Pimpernel (Sir Percy Blakeney)	1903 (October 15)	William Heinemann Ltd.	Baroness Orczy	The Scarlet Pimpernel	Play
The League of the Scarlet Pimpernel	1903 (October 15)	William Heinemann Ltd.	Baroness Orczy	The Scarlet Pimpernel	Play
Rima the Jungle Girl (Riolama)	1904	Duckworth & Co.	William Henry Hudson	Green Mansions: A Romance of the Tropical Forest	Novel
L'Oiselle (Vega de Ortega)	1909 (July 18)	La Mode du Petit Journal	Renée Marie Gouraud dʻAblancourt	L’Oiselle ou Royale énigme	Serialized novel

Despite its short run, Hugo Hercules is seen as the earliest superhero fiction comic.

The Scarlet Pimpernel cited as perhaps the earliest superhero akin to those to become popularized through American comic books.

Rima is the earliest jungle girl heroine while L'Oiselle is noted as the earliest superheroïne overall.

DC Comics made Rima into an actual comic book superheroine in 1974. She starred in a self-titled series which ran for seven issues. And this version of the character guest-starred in the DC Comics Saturday morning cartoon The All-New Super Friends Hour.

== 1910s ==
Character / Team	Year debuted	Company / publisher	Creator/s	First appearance	Medium
The Scarecrow (Doctor Syn)	1910	Thomas Nelson & Sons	Russell Thorndike	Doctor Syn	Play
Nyctalope (Léo Saint-Clair)	1911	Le Matin	Jean de La Hire	Le Mystère des XV	Newspaper serial
John Carter of Mars	1911	The All-Story Magazine	Edgar Rice Burroughs	A Princess of Mars	Magazine
Tarzan	1912 (October)	The All-Story Magazine	Edgar Rice Burroughs	Tarzan of the Apes	Magazine
The Night Wind (Bingham Harvard)	1913 (May 10)	The Cavalier Magazine	Varick Vanardy(Frederick Van Rensselaer Dey)	Alias "The Night Wind"	Magazine
The Gray Seal (Jimmie Dale)	1914 (May)	People's Magazine	Frank L. Packard	"The Adventures of Jimmie Dale"	Magazine
The Masked Marvel (Mort Henderson)	1915	National Wrestling Association (NWA)	Mort Henderson	Unknown 1915 NWA Show	Professional wrestling
Masked Rider (Bruce Edmunds)	1916 (June 12)	Metro Pictures	Fred J. Balshofer	The Masked Rider (1916 film)	Silent film
Ravengar	1916 (October 1)	Pathé Exchange; Astra Film	Randall Parrish, George B. Seitz	The Shielding Shadow	Serial film
Judex (Jacques de Trémeuse)	1916	Gaumont	Louis Feuillade, Arthur Bernède	Judex	Silent film
The Masked Rider	1919 (May 7)	Arrow Film Corp	Aubrey M. Kennedy	"Masked Rider Chapter 1 The Hole in the Wall"	Silent film serial
Zorro (Don Diego Vega)	1919 (August 9)	The All-Story Magazine	Johnston McCulley	"The Curse of Capistrano"	Magazine

== 1920s ==
Character / Team	Year debuted	Company / publisher	Creator/s	First appearance	Medium
Lady Robinhood/La Ortiga (Señorita Catalina)	1925 (July 26)	Robertson-Cole Pictures Corporation	Clifford Howard, Burke Jenkins, Fred Myton	Lady Robinhood	Silent film
The Red Shadow (Pierre Birabeau)	1926 (November 30)	Casino Theatre	Oscar Hammerstein II, Otto Harbach, and Frank Mandel	The Desert Song	Play
Senorita (Señorita Francesca Hernandez)	1927	Paramount Pictures	Lloyd Corrigan, Robert Hopkins, John McDermott	Senorita (film)	Silent film
Buck Rogers	1928 (August)	Amazing Stories	Philip Francis Nowlan	Armageddon 2419 A.D.	Newspaper comic
Patoruzú (Curugua Curuguagüigua)	1928 (October 19)	Diario Critica	Dante Quinterno	Las Aventuras de Don Gil Contento	Newspaper serial
Popeye	1929 (January 17)	Unknown	E.C. Segar	Thimble Theatre	Newspaper comic

== 1930s ==
Character / Team	Year debuted	Company / publisher	Creator/s	First appearance	Medium
The Night Hawk (Thurston Kyle)	1930 (April 5)	Amalgamated Press	John James Brearley Garbutt	The Nelson Lee Library	story paper
The Shadow (Lamont Cranston)	1930 (July 31)	Unknown	Maxwell Grant (Walter B. Gibson)	Detective Stories	Radio
Le Colorado (Hugo Danner)	1930	Alfred A. Knopf	Philip Wylie	Gladiator (novel)	Novel
Golden Bat / Ôgon Batto	1931	Unknown	Takeo Nagamatsu	Golden Bat / Ôgon Batto	Kamishibai (Japanese scroll show)
Dick Tracy	1931 (October 4)	Unknown	Chester Gould	Dick Tracy	Newspaper comics
Pat Patton	1931 (October 4)	Unknown	Chester Gould	Dick Tracy	Newspaper comics
Chandu the Magician (Frank Chandler)	1932 (March 10)	Unknown	Vera Oldham	Chandu the Magician	Radio
Conan the Barbarian	1932 (December)	Unknown	Robert E. Howard	"The Phoenix on the Sword" Weird Tales	Pulp fiction
Lone Ranger (John Reid)	1933 (January 30)	Unknown	George W. Trendle	The Lone Ranger	Radio
Tonto	1933 (February 25)	Unknown	Fran Striker	The Lone Ranger	Radio
Doc Savage	1933 (March)	Unknown	Kenneth Robeson (Lester Dent)	The Man of Bronze	Pulp fiction
Moon Man (Stephen Thatcher)	1933 (June)	Unknown	Frederick C. Davis	Ten Detective Aces	Pulp fiction
The Spider	1933 (October)	Popular Publications	Harry Steeger	The Spider #1: "The Spider Strikes"	Pulp fiction
Flash Gordon	1934 (January 7)	Unknown	Alex Raymond	On the Planet Mongo	Newspaper comics
Mandrake the Magician	1934 (June 11)	Unknown	Lee Falk	Mandrake the Magician	Newspaper comics
Lothar the Stongman	1934 (June 11)	Unknown	Lee Falk	Mandrake the Magician	Newspaper comics
The Green Hornet (Britt Reid)	1936 (January 31)	Unknown	George W. Trendle and Fran Striker	The Green Hornet	Radio
Kato	1936 (January 31)	Unknown	George W. Trendle and Fran Striker	The Green Hornet	Radio
The Phantom	1936 (February 17)	Unknown	Lee Falk	The Phantom	Newspaper comics
Domino Lady (Ellen Patrick)	1936 (May)	Unknown	Lars Anderson	Saucy Romantic Adventures	Pulp fiction
The Eagle (Don Loring)	1936 (August 22)	Republic Pictures	Maurice Geraghty, Winston Miller, John Rathmell, Leslie Swabacker	The Vigilantes Are Coming	Film serial
Zarnak	1936 (August)	Unknown	Max Plaisted	"The Plunder Plague" (Thrilling Wonder Stories)	Pulp fiction
The Girl with the X-ray Eyes (Olga Mesmer)	1937 (August)	Unknown	Watt Dell	Spicy Mystery Stories	Pulp fiction
Black Bat	1939 (July)	Nedor	Norman A. Daniels	Black Book Detective	Pulp fiction
Captain Midnight	1938 (October)	Unknown	Wilfred G. Moore and Robert M. Burtt	Captain Midnight	Radio
The Avenger (Richard Henry Benson)	1939 (September)	Unknown	Kenneth Robeson (Paul Ernst)	"Justice, Inc."The Avenger Magazine #1	Pulp fiction

=== Comic book ===
Character / Team	Year debuted	Company	Creator/s	First appearance
Secret Operative No. 48 (Detective Dan Dunn)	1933 (May 12)	Norman Marsh	Original Comic Book Character	
Doctor Occult (Richard Occult)	1935 (October)	DC	Jerry Siegel, Joe Shuster	New Fun Comics #6
Rose Psychic (Rose Spiritus)	1935 (October)	DC	Jerry Siegel, Joe Shuster	New Fun Comics #6
Dinky (later to become one of the two Cyclone Kids, sidekicks to Red Tornado)	1936 (August)	Dell	Sheldon Mayer	Popular Comics # 7
The Clock	1936 (November)	Comics Magazine Co	George Brenner	Funny Pages #6 or Funny Picture Stories #1
Slam Bradley	1937 (March)	DC	Malcolm Wheeler-Nicholson, Jerry Siegel, Joe Shuster	Detective Comics #1
Sheena, Queen of the Jungle	1938 (January in Britain, September in USA)	Fiction House	Will Eisner and S.M. "Jerry" Iger	Wags #46 (in Britain, Jumbo Comics #1 in USA)
Dick Fulmine	1938 (March)	L'Audace	Carlo Cossio and Vincenzo Baggioli	Albi dell'audacia #2
Superman (Clark Kent)	1938 (June)	DC	Jerry Siegel, Joe Shuster	Action Comics #1
Zatara	1938 (June)	DC	Fred Guardineer	Action Comics #1
Americommando (Harold "Tex" Thompson)	1938 (June)	DC	Ken Fitch, Bernard Baily	Action Comics #1
Fatman (Bob Daley)	1938 (July)	DC	Ken Fitch, Bernard Baily	Action Comics #2
Arrow	1938 (September)	Centaur Publications	Paul Gustavson	Funny Pages vol. 2 #10 (or #21)
Crimson Avenger (Lee Travis)	1938 (October)	DC	Jim Chambers	Detective Comics #20
Wing	1938 (October)	DC	Jim Chambers	Detective Comics #20
Namor the Sub-Mariner	1939 (April)	Marvel/Timely	Bill Everett	Motion Picture Funnies Weekly #1
American Ace (Perry Webb)	1939 (April)	Marvel Comics	Paul Lauretta	Motion Picture Funnies Weekly #1
The Guardian Angel (Hop Harrigan)	1939 (April)	DC	Jon Blummer	All-American Comics #1
Batman (Bruce Wayne)	1939 (May)	DC	Bob Kane, Bill Finger	Detective Comics #27
Wonder Man (Fox Publications)	1939 (May)	Fox Publications	Will Eisner	Wonder Comics #1
Ma Hunkel and Sisty (later to become Red Tornado and one of her two sidekicks, the Cyclone Kids, respectively)	1939 (June)	DC	Sheldon Mayer	All-American Comics # 3
The Flame (Gary Preston)	1939 (July)	Fox Publications	Will Eisner, Lou Fine	Wonderworld Comics #3
Sandman (Wesley Dodds)	1939 (April)	DC	Gardner Fox, Bert Christman	World's Fair Comics #1
Fantom of the Fair	1939 (July)	Centaur Publications	Paul Gustavson	Amazing Mystery Funnies vol. 2, #7
Blue Beetle (Dan Garret)	1939 (August)	Fox Publications	Charles Nicholas	Mystery Men Comics #1
Green Mask (Michael Shelby)	1939 (August)	Fox Publications	Walter Frehm	Mystery Men Comics #1
Bozo the Iron Man	1939 (August)	Quality Comics	George Brenner	Smash Comics #1
Invisible Hood	1939 (August)	Quality Comics	Art Pinajian	Smash Comics #1
Masked Raider (Jim Gardley)	1939 (August)	Marvel Comics	Al Anders	Marvel Comics #1
Amazing-Man	1939 (September)	Centaur Publications	Bill Everett	Amazing-Man Comics #5
The Human Torch (Jim Hammond, original)	1939 (October)	Marvel/Timely	Carl Burgos	Marvel Comics #1
Angel (Thomas Halloway)	1939 (October)	Marvel/Timely	Paul Gustavson	Marvel Comics #1
Ka-Zar (David Rand)	1939 (October)	Marvel/Timely	Bob Byrd, Ben Thompson	Marvel Comics #1
Fiery Mask (Jack Castle)	1939 (October)	Marvel/Timely	Joe Simon	Daring Mystery Comics #1
John Steele	1939 (October)	Marvel/Timely	Larry Antonette	Daring Mystery Comics #1
Monako	1939 (October)	Marvel/Timely	Larry Antonette	Daring Mystery Comics #1
Flash Foster (Robert Foster)	1939 (October)	Marvel/Timely	Bob Wood	Daring Mystery Comics#1
Shock Gibson	1939 (October)	Brookwood Publications	Maurice Scott	Speed Comics #1
Magician from Mars (Jane 6EM35)	1939 (November)	Centaur Publications	John Giunta, Malcolm Kildale	Amazing-Man Comics #7
Ultra-Man (Gary Concord, Jr.)	1939 (November)	DC	Jon L. Blummer	All-American Comics #8
Stardust the Super Wizard	1939 (December)	Fox Feature Syndicate	Fletcher Hanks	Fantastic Comics #1
Samson	1939 (December)	Fox Feature Syndicate	Will Eisner, Alex Blum	Fantastic Comics #1
Doll Man	1939 (December)	Quality Comics	Will Eisner	Feature Comics #27
Wizard	1939 (December)	MLJ Comics/Archie Comics	Will Harr, Edd Ashe Jr	Top-Notch Comics #1
The Phantom Bullet (Allan Lewis)	1939 (December)	Marvel/Timely	Joe Simon	Daring Mystery Comics #2
Trojak	1939 (December)	Marvel/Timely	Joe Simon	Daring Mystery Comics #2
Mister E (Victor Jay)	1939 (December)	Marvel/Timely	Joe Cal Cagno, Al Carreno	Daring Mystery Comics #2
Laughing Mask (Dennis Burton)	1939 (December)	Marvel/Timely	Will Harr, Maurice Gutwirth	Daring Mystery Comics #2
Electro	1939 (December)	Marvel/Timely	Steve Dahlman	Marvel Mystery Comics #4
Ferret (Dennis Piper)	1939 (December)	Marvel/Timely	Stockbridge Winslow, Irwin Hasen	Marvel Mystery Comics #4

== 1940s ==
Character / Team	Year debuted	Company / publisher	Creator/s	First appearance	Medium
The Spirit	1940 (June 2)	Register and Tribune Syndicate	Will Eisner	The Spirit	Newspaper comics
Lady Luck	1940 (June 2)	Unknown	Will Eisner, Chuck Mazoujian	Lady Luck in The Spirit Section	Newspaper comics
Mr. Mystic	1940 (June 2)	Unknown	Will Eisner, Bob Powell	Mr. Mystic in The Spirit Section	Newspaper comics
Invisible Scarlet O'Neil	1940 (June 3)	Unknown	Russell Stamm	Invisible Scarlet O'Neil	Newspaper comics
Black Fury/Miss Fury	1941 (April 6)	Unknown	June Tarpé Mills	Black Fury	Newspaper comics
Senorita Scorpion (Elgera Douglas)	1944	Fiction House	Les Savage Jr	Senorita Scorpion	Pulp magazine
Black Whip	1944 (December 16)	Republic Pictures	Basil Dickey, Jesse Duffy, Grant Nelson, Joseph Poland	Zorro's Black Whip	Film serial
Captain Video	1949 (June 27)	DuMont Television Network	Lawrence Menkin & James Caddigan	Captain Video and His Video Rangers	Television show

=== Comic book ===
Character / Team	Year debuted	Company	Creator/s	First appearance
Flash (Jay Garrick)	1940 (January)	DC	Gardner Fox, Harry Lampert	Flash Comics #1
Hawkman (Carter Hall)	1940 (January)	DC	Gardner Fox	Flash Comics #1
Johnny Thunder	1940 (January)	DC	John W. Wentworth, Stan Asch	Flash Comics #1
Whip (Rodney Gaynor)	1940 (January)	DC	John B. Wentworth, George Storm	Flash Comics #1
The Shield	1940 (January)	MLJ/Archie	Harry Shorten, Irv Novick	Pep Comics #1
Comet	1940 (January)	MLJ Comics/Archie Comics	Jack Cole	Pep Comics #1
Fiery Mask	1940 (January)	Timely/Marvel Comics	Joe Simon	Daring Mystery Comics #1
Flexo	1940 (January)	Marvel	Will Harr, Jack Binder	Mystic Comics #1
Blue Blaze (Spencer Keen)	1940 (January)	Marvel/Timely	Harry Douglas	Mystic Comics #1
Captain Marvel (Shazam)	1940 (February)	Fawcett Comics/DC	C. C. Beck, Bill Parker	Whiz Comics #2
Golden Arrow	1940 (February)	Fawcett Comics		Whiz Comics #2
Ibis the Invincible	1940 (February)	Fawcett Comics	Bob Kingett	Whiz Comics #2
Spy Smasher	1940 (February)	Fawcett Comics	C. C. Beck, Bill Parker	Whiz Comics #2
Ferret	1940 (February)	Marvel/Timely Comics		Marvel Mystery Comics #4
Mister E	1940 (February)	Timely/Marvel	Joe Calcagno	Daring Mystery Comics #2
Laughing Mask	1940 (February)	Timely/Marvel Comics		Daring Mystery Comics #2
Spectre (Jim Corrigan)	1940 (February)	DC	Jerry Siegel	More Fun Comics #52
Fantomah	1940 (February)	Fiction House	Fletcher Hanks	Jungle Comics #2
Doc Strange	1940 (February)	Nedor Comics	Richard E. Hughes, Alexander Kostuk	Thrilling Comics #1
Dynamo	1940 (February)	Fox Feature Syndicate	Robert Webb	Science Comics #1
Marvex	1940 (February)	Marvel/Timely	Allen Simon	Daring Mystery Comics #4
Captain Strong	1940 (February)	Marvel/Timely	Martin Goodman	Daring Mystery Comics #3
Master Mind Excello	1940 (February)	Marvel/Timely	Arnold Hicks	Mystic Comics #2
Taxi Taylor	1940 (February)	Marvel/Timely		Mystic Comics #2
Invisible Man	1940 (February)	Marvel/Timely	Newt Alfred	Mystic Comics #2
Hourman (Rex Tyler)	1940 (March)	DC	Ken Fitch, Bernard Bailey	Adventure Comics #48
The King (King Standish)	1940 (March)	DC	Gardner Fox, William Smith	Flash Comics #3
Silver Streak	1940 (March)	Lev Gleason Publications	Joe Simon, Jack Binder	Silver Streak Comics #3
Dynamic Man	1940 (March)	Timely/Marvel Comics	Daniel Peters	Mystic Comics #1
Master Man	1940 (March)	Fawcett Comics		Master Comics #1
Woman in Red	1940 (March)	Nedor Comics	Richard E. Hughes, George Mandel	Thrilling Comics #2
Dick Grayson (Robin I, Nightwing)	1940 (April)	DC	Bob Kane, Bill Finger, Jerry Robinson	Detective Comics #38
Catwoman (Selina Kyle)	1940 (April)	DC	Bob Kane, Bill Finger	Batman #1
Black Pirate	1940 (April)	DC	Sheldon Moldoff	Action Comics #23
Master Mind Excello	1940 (April)	Timely/Marvel		Mystic Comics #2
Breeze Barton	1940 (April)	Timely/Marvel Comics	Jack Binder	Daring Mystery Comics #3
Phantom Reporter	1940 (April)	Timely/Marvel		Daring Mystery Comics #3
Ghost	1940 (April)	Nedor Comics		Thrilling Comics #3
Black Owl	1940 (April)	Prize Publications		Prize Comics #2
Skyman	1940 (May)	Columbia Comics	Gardner Fox, Ogden Whitney	Big Shot Comics #1
Bulletman and Bulletgirl	1940 (May)	Fawcett Comics/DC	Bill Parker (comics)	Nickel Comics #1
Red Torpedo	1940 (May)	Quality Comics		Crack Comics #1
Madame Fatal	1940 (May)	Quality Comics	Art Pinajian	Crack Comics #1
Black Condor	1940 (May)	Quality Comics	Will Eisner, Lou Fine	Crack Comics #1
Alias The Spider	1940 (May)	Quality Comics	Paul Gustavson	Crack Comics #1
Rusty Ryan	1940 (May)	Quality Comics	Paul Gustavson	Feature Comics #32
Doctor Fate (Kent Nelson)	1940 (May)	DC	Gardner Fox, Howard Sherman	More Fun Comics #55
The Face	1940 (May)	Columbia Comics	Mart Bailey	Big Shot Comics #1
Congo Bill	1940 (June)	DC	Whitney Ellsworth, George Papp	More Fun Comics #56
Scarlet Avenger	1940 (June)		Harry Shorten, Irv Novick	Zip Comics #1
Thin Man	1940 (June)	Timely/Marvel Comics	Klaus Nordling	Mystic Comics #4
Marvel Boy	1940 (June)	Timely/Marvel Comics	Joe Simon, Jack Kirby	Daring Mystery Comics #6
Fox	1940 (June)	MLJ Comics/Archie Comics	Joe Blair, Irwin Hasen	Blue Ribbon Comics #4
Blue Bolt	1940 (June)	Novelty Press	Joe Simon	Blue Bolt Comics #1
Lash Lightning	1940 (June)	Ace Comics		Sure-Fire Comics #1
Raven	1940 (June)	Ace Comics		Sure-Fire Comics #1
Captain Future	1940 (June)	Nedor Comics	Kin Platt	Startling Comics #1
Tigerman	1940 (June)	Timely/Marvel	Mike Roy	Daring Mystery Comics #6
Uncle Sam	1940 (July)	Quality Comics/DC	Will Eisner	National Comics #1
Green Lantern (Alan Scott, original)	1940 (July)	DC	Martin Nodell, Bill Finger	All-American Comics #16
Red Bee	1940 (July)	Quality Comics/DC	Toni Blum, Charles Nicholas	Hit Comics #1
Neon the Unknown	1940 (July)	Quality Comics	Jerry Iger	Hit Comics #1
Merlin the Magician	1940 (July)	Quality Comics		National Comics #1
The Owl	1940 (July)	Dell Comics	Frank Thomas	Crackajack Funnies #25
Magno	1940 (August)	Quality Comics	Paul Gustavson	Smash Comics #13
Black Widow (Claire Voyant)	1940 (August)	Timely/Marvel Comics	George Kapitan, Harry Sahle	Mystic Comics #4
Red Raven	1940 (August)	Timely/Marvel Comics	Joe Simon, Louis Cazeneuve	Red Raven Comics #1
Makkari (Mercury/Hurricane), Zuras (Jupiter), Thena (Minerva)	1940 (August)	Timely/Marvel Comics	Martin A. Bursten, Jack Kirby, Joe Simon	Red Raven Comics #1 as Mercury, Captain America Comics #1 as Hurricane
Airman	1940 (August)	Centaur Publications	George Kapitan, Harry Sahle	Keen Detective Funnies #23
Hydroman	1940 (August)	Eastern Color Printing	Bill Everett	Reg'lar Fellers Heroic Comics #1
Toro	1940 (September)	Timely/Marvel Comics	Carl Burgos	Human Torch Comics #2
Daredevil (Lev Gleason Publications)	1940 (September)	Gleason Publications	Jack Binder (comics)	Silver Streak #6
Cat-Man, Kitten	1940 (September)	Holyoke Publishing	Irwin Hasen	Crash Comic Adventures #4
The Ray	1940 (September)	Quality Comics	Lou Fine	Smash Comics #14
Firefly	1940 (September)	MLJ Comics/Archie Comics	Harry Shorten, Bob Wood	Top-Notch Comics #8
Atom (Al Pratt)	1940 (October)	DC	Ben Flinton, Bill O'Conner	All-American Comics #19
Mr. Scarlet	1940 (Winter)	Fawcett Comics	France Herron, Jack Kirby	Wow Comics #1
Black Hood	1940 (October)	MLJ Comics/Archie Comics	Harry Shorten	Top-Notch Comics #9
Vision (Aarkus)	1940 (November)	Marvel/Timely	Joe Simon, Jack Kirby	Marvel Mystery Comics #13
Red Tornado (Ma Hunkel)	1940 (November)	DC	Sheldon Mayer	All-American Comics #20
Quicksilver (Max Mercury)	1940 (November)	Quality Comics/DC	Jack Cole (artist), Chuck Mazoujian	National Comics #5
Target and the Targeteers	1940 (November)	Novelty Press	Dick Hamilton	Target Comics #10
Justice Society of America	1940 (Winter)	DC	Gardner Fox	All Star Comics #3
Green Lama	1940 (December)	Crestwood Publications	Kendell Foster Crossen	Prize Comics #1
Moon Man	1940 (December)	Timely/Marvel	Fred Guardineer	Mystic Comics #5
Black Terror	1941 (January)	Nedor Comics	Richard E. Hughes, Don Gabrielson	Exciting Comics #9
Midnight	1941 (January)	Quality Comics	Jack Cole	Smash Comics #18
Professor Supermind and Son	1941 (February)	Dell Comics		Popular Comics #60
Minute-Man	1941 (February)	Fawcett Comics	Charlie Sultan	Master Comics #11
Black Marvel (Daniel Lyons)	1941 (March)	Marvel/Timely	Al Gabriele and unknown writer	Mystic Comics #5
Blazing Skull (Mark Todd)	1941 (March)	Marvel/Timely		Mystic Comics #5
The Terror	1941 (March)	Marvel/Timely		Mystic Comics #5
Captain America (Steve Rogers)	1941 (March)	Marvel/Timely	Joe Simon, Jack Kirby	Captain America Comics #1
Bucky Barnes	1941 (March)	Timely/Marvel Comics	Jack Kirby, Joe Simon	Captain America Comics #1
The Patriot (Jeffrey Mace)	1941 (Spring)	Timely/Marvel Comics	Ray Gill, George Mandel	The Human Torch # 4
Blue Diamond	1941 (April)	Timely/Marvel Comics	Joe Simon, Jack Kirby	Daring Mystery Comics #7
Thunderer	1941 (April)	Timely/Marvel Comics	Carl Burgos, John Compton	Daring Mystery Comics #7
Silver Scorpion	1941 (April)	Timely/Marvel Comics	Harry Sahle	Daring Mystery Comics #7
The Fin	1941 (April)	Timely/Marvel Comics	Bill Everett	Daring Mystery Comics #7
Starman (Ted Knight) (Ted Knight)	1941 (April)	DC	Gardner Fox, Jack Burnley	Adventure Comics #61
Doctor Mid-Nite (Charles McNider)	1941 (April)	DC	Charles Reizenstein, Stanley Aschmeier	All-American Comics #25
Black Fury (John Perry)	1941 (April)	Fox Feature Syndicate	Dennis Neville, Mark Howell	Fantastic Comics #17
Sargon the Sorcerer	1941 (May)	DC	John B. Wentworth, Howard Purcell	All American Comics #26
Captain Battle	1941 (May)	Lev Gleason Publications		Silver Streak Comics #11
Captain Freedom	1941 (May)	Harvey Comics	Franklin Flagg	Speed Comics #13
Jester	1941 (May)	Quality Comics	Paul Gustavson	Smash Comics #22
Young Allies	1941 (Summer)	Timely/Marvel Comics	Jack Kirby, Joe Simon	Young Allies Comics #1
Doiby Dickles	1941 (June)	DC	Bill Finger, Irwin Hasen	All-American Comics #27
Twister	1941 (June)	Novelty Press	Paul Gustavson	Blue Bolt Comics (vol. 2) #1
Hawkgirl (Shiera Sanders Hall)	1941 (July)	DC	Gardner Fox Evelyn Gaines	All-Star Comics #5
Dynamic-Man	1941 (July)	Dynamic Publications		Dynamic Comics #1
Whizzer (Robert Frank)	1941 (August)	Marvel/Timely	Al Avison, Al Gabriele	USA Comics #1
Jack Frost	1941 (August)	Timely/Marvel Comics	Stan Lee, Charles Wojtkoski	U.S.A. Comics # 1
Rockman	1941 (August)	Timely/Marvel Comics	Charles Nicholas, Basil Wolverton	U.S.A. Comics #1
Wildfire	1941 (August)	Quality Comics	Robert Turner, Jim Mooney	Smash Comics #25
American Crusader	1941 (August)	Nedor Comics	Writer and artist unknown	Thrilling Comics #19
Black Cat (Harvey Comics)	1941 (August)	Harvey Comics	Al Gabriele	Pocket Comics #1
Blackhawk (DC Comics)	1941 (August)	Quality Comics/DC	Will Eisner, Chuck Cuidera	Military Comics #1
Miss America (DC Comics)	1941 (August)	Quality Comics/DC		Military Comics #1
Blue Tracer	1941 (August)	Quality Comics		Military Comics #1
Mouthpiece	1941 (August)	Quality Comics	Fred Guardineer	Police Comics #1
Firebrand	1941 (August)	Quality Comics	Jerry Iger, Reed Crandall	Police Comics #1
Fly-Man	1941 (August)	Harvey Comics	Sam Glanzman	Spitfire Comics #1
711 (Quality Comics)	1941 (August)	Quality Comics/DC	George Brenner	Police Comics #1
Human Bomb	1941 (August)	Quality Comics/DC	Paul Gustavson	Police Comics #1
Plastic Man	1941 (August)	Quality Comics/DC	Jack Cole (artist)	Police Comics #1
Phantom Lady	1941 (August)	Quality Comics/DC	Arthur Peddy	Police Comics #1
Nelvana of the Northern Lights	1941 (August)	Hillborough Studios (Canada)	Adrian Dingle	Triumph Comics #1
Spirit of ‘76	1941 (August)	Harvey Comics	Gary Blakey and Bob Powell	Pocket Comics #1
U.S. Jones	1941 (August)	Fox Feature Syndicate		Wonderworld Comics #28
Unknown Soldier	1941 (August)	Ace Comics		Our Flag Comics #1
Yank & Doodle	1941 (August)	Prize Publications	Paul Norris	Prize Comics #13
Zebra	1941 (August)	Harvey Comics	Pierce Rice, Ellery King, Arthur Cazeneuve	Pocket Comics #1
Johnny Quick (Johnny Chambers)	1941 (September)	DC	Mort Weisinger, Chad Grothkopf	More Fun Comics #71
Shining Knight	1941 (September)	DC	Creig Flessel	Adventure Comics #66
Captain Flag	1941 (September)	MLJ/Archie	Joe Blair, Lin Streeter	Blue Ribbon Comics #16
Fighting Yank	1941 (September)	Nedor Comics	Richard Hughes, Jon Blummer	Startling Comics #10
Lieutenant Marvels	1941 (September)	Fawcett Comics	C. C. Beck	Whiz Comics #21
Spider Queen	1941 (September)	Fox Feature Syndicate	Elsa Lesau	The Eagle #2
Captain Courageous	1941 (September)	Ace Comics		Banner Comics #3
Star-Spangled Kid (Sylvester Pemberton)	1941 (October)	DC	Jerry Siegel, Hal Sherman	Star Spangled Comics #1
Stripesy (Pat Dugan)	1941 (October)	DC	Jerry Siegel, Hal Sherman	Star-Spangled Comics #1
Destroyer	1941 (October)	Timely/Marvel Comics	Stan Lee	Mystic Comics #6
Tarantula	1941 (October)	DC	Mort Weisinger	Star-Spangled Comics #1
American Eagle	1941 (October)	Standard Comics	Richard E. Hughes, Kin Platt	Exciting Comics #22
Pinky the Whiz Kid	1941 (Winter)	Fawcett Comics	Otto Binder, Jack Binder	Wow Comics #4
Aquaman	1941 (November)	DC	Mort Weisinger, Paul Norris	More Fun Comics #73
Vigilante	1941 (November)	DC	Mort Weisinger, Mort Meskin	Action Comics #42
Green Arrow (Oliver Queen) and Speedy	1941 (November)	DC	Mort Weisinger, Greg Papp	More Fun Comics #73
Rocketman and Rocketgirl	1941 (November)	Harry ‘A’ Chesler		Scoop Comics #1
Sandy the Golden Boy	1941 (December)	DC	Joe Simon and Jack Kirby	Adventure Comics #69
Seven Soldiers of Victory	1941 (December)	DC	Mort Weisinger	Leading Comics #1
Wonder Woman (Diana Prince)	1941 (December)	DC	William Moulton Marston, H. G. Peter	All Star Comics #8 / Sensation Comics #1
Liberator (Nedor Comics)	1941 (December)	Nedor Comics	Writer and artist unknown	Exciting Comics #15
Kitten	1941 (December)	Holyoke Publishing	Charles M. Quinlan	Cat-Man Comics Vol 1 #10
Captain Marvel Jr.	1941 (December)	Fawcett Comics/DC	Ed Herron, Mac Raboy	Whiz Comics #25
Witness	1941 (December)	Timely/Marvel Comics	Stan Lee	Mystic Comics #7
Wildcat (Ted Grant)	1942 (January)	DC	Bill Finger, Irwin Hasen	Sensation Comics #1
Mister Terrific (Terry Sloane)	1942 (January)	DC	Chuck Reizenstein, Hal Sharp	Sensation Comics #1
Gay Ghost	1942 (January)	DC	Gardner Fox, Howard Purcell	Sensation Comics #1
Little Boy Blue and the Blue Boys	1942 (January)	DC		Sensation Comics #1
Citizen V	1942 (January)	Timely/Marvel Comics		Daring Mystery Comics #8
V-Man	1942 (January)	Fox Feature Syndicate		V...Comics #1
Air Wave	1942 (February)	DC	Murray Boltinoff or Mort Weisinger, and Lee Harris (illustrator)	Detective Comics #60
Stuff the Chinatown Kid	1942 (February)	DC	Mort Weisinger, Mort Meskin	Action Comics #45
Johnny Canuck (as superhero)	1942 (February)	[Canada]	Leo Bachle	Dime Comics #1
Dan the Dyna-Mite	1942 (Spring)	DC	Mort Weisinger	Star-Spangled Comics #7
TNT (comics)	1942 (April)	DC	Mort Weisinger	Star-Spangled Comics #7
Manhunter (Paul Kirk)	1942 (April)	DC	Jack Kirby, Joe Simon	Adventure Comics #73
Manhunter (Dan Richards)	1942 (March)	Quality Comics/DC		Police Comics #8
Robotman (Robert Crane)	1942 (April)	DC	Jerry Siegel, Leo Nowak	Star-Spangled Comics #7
Newsboy Legion	1942 (April)	DC	Joe Simon, Jack Kirby	Star-Spangled Comics #7
The Guardian (Jim Harper)	1942 (April)	DC	Joe Simon, Jack Kirby	Star-Spangled Comics #7
Blue Blade	1942 (Summer)	Timely/Marvel Comics		U.S.A. Comics #5
Commando Yank	1942 (July)	Fawcett Comics/DC		Wow Comics #6
Phantom Eagle	1942 (July)	Fawcett Comics		Wow Comics #6
Web	1942 (July)	MLJ Comics/Archie Comics	John Cassone	Zip Comics #27
Genius Jones	1942 (August)	DC	Alfred Bester, Stan Kaye	Adventure Comics #77
Captain Commando	1942 (August)		S.M. "Jerry" Iger, Alex Blum	Pep Comics #30
Liberty Belle	1942 (Winter)	DC	Don Cameron	Boy Commandos #1
Airboy	1942 (November)	Hillman Periodicals	Charles Biro	Air Fighters Comics #2
Kid Eternity	1942 (December)	Quality Comics/DC	Otto Binder, Sheldon Moldoff	Hit Comics #25
Mary Marvel	1942 (December)	Fawcett Comics/DC	Otto Binder, Marc Swayze	Captain Marvel Adventures #18
Pyroman	1942 (December)	Nedor Comics	Jack Binder	Startling Comics # 18
Captain Triumph	1943 (January)	Quality Comics	Alfred Andriola	Crack Comics #27
Captain Wonder	1943 (February)	Timely/Marvel Comics	Otto Binder, Frank Giacoia	Kid Komics #1
Canada Jack	1943 (March)		George Menendez Rae	Canadian Heroes Vol. 1, #5
Uncle Marvel	1943 (October)	Fawcett Comics	Otto Binder, Marc Swayze	Wow Comics #18
Miss America	1943 (November)	Marvel/Timely	Otto Binder, Al Gabriele	Marvel Mystery Comics #49
Magnet	1944	Nedor Comics		Complete Book of Comics and Funnies #1
Grim Reaper	1944 (May)	Nedor Comics	Author unknown, artist Al Camy	Fighting Yank #7
Green Turtle	1944 (June)	Rural Home Publications	Chu F. Hing	Blazing Comics #1
Lance Lewis, Space Detective	1944 (July)	Nedor Comics		Mystery Comics #3
The Bouncer	1944 (September)	Fox Feature Syndicate	Robert Kanigher, Louis Ferstadt	The Bouncer
Yellowjacket	1944 (September)	Charlton Comics		Yellowjacket Comics #1
Superboy (Clark Kent)	1945 (January)	DC	Don Cameron, Jerry Siegel, Joe Shuster	More Fun Comics #101
Patoruzito	1945 (October 11)	Dante Quinterno S.A:	Dante Quinterno, Tulio Lovato y Mirco Repetto	Patoruzito Magazine #01
Scarab	1945 (July)	Nedor Comics		Startling Comics #34
Cavalier	1946 (April)	Nedor Comics	Sam Cooper	Thrilling Comics #53
Bronze Man	1946 (July/August)	Fox Feature Syndicate	AC Hollingsworth	Blue Beetle #42
All-Winners Squad	1946 (Fall)	Marvel/Timely	Martin Goodman (publisher), Bill Finger	All Winners Comics #19
Blonde Phantom	1946 (Fall)	Timely/Marvel Comics	Stan Lee, Syd Shores	All Select Comics #11
Miss Masque	1946 (September)	Nedor Comics		Exciting Comics #51
Princess Pantha	1946 (October)	Nedor Comics	Art Saaf	Thrilling Comics #56
Blue Flame	1946 (December)	Four Star	Zoltan Szenics	
Namora	1947 (May)	Timely/Marvel	Ken Bald	Marvel Mystery Comics#82
Judy of the Jungle	1947 (May)	Nedor Comics	Ralph Mayo	Exciting Comics #55
Black Canary	1947 (August)	DC	Robert Kanigher, Carmine Infantino	Flash Comics #86
Moon Girl	1947 (Fall)	EC Comics	Gardner Fox, Sheldon Moldoff	The Happy Houligans #1
Tawky Tawny	1947 (December)	Fawcett Comics	Otto Binder, C. C. Beck	Captain Marvel Adventures #79
Funnyman	1948 (January)	Magazine Enterprises	Jerry Siegel, Joe Shuster	Funnyman #1
Golden Girl (Betsy Ross)	1948 (April)	Marvel/Timely		Captain America #1 (As Betsy Ross); Captain America #66 (As Golden Girl)
Merry, Girl of 1000 Gimmicks/Gimmick Girl (Merry Pemberton)	1948 (June)	DC	Otto Binder, Win Mortimer	Star-Spangled Comics #81
Sun Girl	1948 (August)	Marvel/Timely Comics	Ken Bald	Sun Girl #1
Ghost Rider (Carter Slade)	1949	Magazine Enterprises	Ray Krank, Dick Ayers	Tim Holt #11

Character / Team	Year Debuted	Creator/s	Media
Maximo the Amazing Superman	1940	Russell R. Winterbotham, Henry E. Vallely and Erwin L. Hess	Big Little Book

== 1950s ==
Character / Team	Year debuted	Company / publisher	Creator/s	First appearance	Medium
Astro Boy / Tetsuwan Atomu (Astro / Atom)	1951	Weekly Shōnen Magazine	Osamu Tezuka	Ambassador Atom	Manga
Boys Detective Club	1956	Toei		The Boy Detectives Club	Tokusatsu Movie series
Star Man / Supa Jaiantu	1957	Shintoho	Ichiro Miyagawa	Super Giant	Tokusatsu Television Show
Moonlight Mask / Gekko Kamen (Juro Iwai)	1958	Senkosha Productions	Kōhan Kawauchi	Moonlight Mask	Tokusatsu Television Show and Films
Prince of Space/Yusei Oji	1958	Toei		Prince of Space	Tokusatsu Film and Movie series
Nana-iro Kamen/Seven Colored Mask	1959	Toei		Seven Color Mask	Tokusatsu Film series

=== Comic book ===
Character / Team	Year debuted	Company	Creator/s	First appearance
Knight (DC Comics)	1950 (December)	DC	Bill Finger, Dick Sprang	Batman #62
Marvel Boy (Robert Grayson)	1950 (December)	Marvel	Stan Lee, Russ Heath	Marvel Boy #1
Captain Comet	1951 (June)	DC	John Broome, Carmine Infantino	Strange Adventures #9
Doll Girl	1951 (December)	Quality Comics	Will Eisner	Doll Man #37
Phantom Stranger	1952 (August)	DC	John Broome, Carmine Infantino, Sy Barry	Phantom Stranger #1
Marvelman (later Miracleman)	1954 (February)	[U.K.]	Mick Anglo	Marvelman #25
Fighting American	1954 (April)	Prize Group	Joe Simon & Jack Kirby	Fighting American #1
Captain Flash	1954 (November)		Mike Sekowsky (artist, writer unknown)	Captain Flash #1
Krypto	1955 (March)	DC	Otto Binder, Curt Swan	Adventure Comics #210
Silent Knight	1955 (August)	DC	Robert Kanigher, Irv Novick	The Brave and the Bold #1
Martian Manhunter	1955 (November)	DC	Joseph Samachson, Joe Certa	Detective Comics #225
Mr. Muscles	1956 (March)	Charlton	Jerry Siegel	Mr. Muscles #22
Nature Boy	1956 (March)	Charlton	Jerry Siegel, John Buscema	Nature Boy #3
Batwoman (Kathy Kane)	1956 (July)	DC	Edmond Hamilton, Sheldon Moldoff	Detective Comics #233
Flash (Barry Allen)	1956 (October)	DC	Robert Kanigher, Carmine Infantino	Showcase #4
Challengers of the Unknown	1957 (February)	DC	Jack Kirby	Showcase #6
Legion of Super-Heroes	1958 (April)	DC	Mort Weisinger, Otto Binder	Adventure Comics #247
Space Ranger	1958 (July)	DC	Edmond Hamilton, Bob Brown	Showcase #15
Super Girl (tryout version)	1958 (August)	DC	Otto Binder, Al Plastino	Superman #123
Adam Strange	1958 (November)	DC	Gardner Fox, Mike Sekowsky	Showcase Comics #17
Herbie Popnecker	1958 (December)		Richard E. Hughes, Ogden Whitney	Forbidden Worlds #73
Lady Blackhawk	1959 (February)	DC	Jack Schiff and Dick Dillin	Blackhawks #133
Supergirl (Kara Zor-El)	1959 (May)	DC	Otto Binder, Al Plastino	Action Comics #252
The Fly	1959 (June)	Archie Comics	Joe Simon, Jack Kirby	The Double Life of Private Strong #1
The Shield (Lancelot Strong)	1959 (June)	Archie Comics	Joe Simon, Jack Kirby	The Double Life of Private Strong #1
Green Lantern (Hal Jordan)	1959 (October)	DC	Julius Schwartz, John Broome, Gil Kane	Showcase #22
Kid Flash (Wally West)	1959 (December)	DC	John Broome, Carmine Infantino	The Flash #110

== 1960s ==
Character / Team	Year debuted	Company / publisher	Creator/s	First appearance	Medium
Allah's Messenger	1960	Toei		Messanger of Allah	Tokusatsu Television Show
National Kid	1960	Toei		National Kid	Tokusatsu Series
Iron Sharp	1961	Toei		Invasion of the Neptune Men	Tokusatsu Film
Kalimán	1963	Unknown	Rafael Cutberto Navarro & Modesto Vázquez González	Kalimán	Radio Show
Ultraman (Shin Hayata), Zoffy	1966 (July 17)	Tsuburaya Productions	Eiji Tsuburaya	Ultraman #1 Ultra Operation No. 1	Tokusatsu Television Show
Science Special Search Party (SSSP)- Captain Toshio Muramatsu, Shin Hayata, Akiko Fuji, Daisuke Arashi, Mitsuhiro Ide, Isamu Hoshino, Dr. Iwamoto	1966 (July 17)	Tsuburaya Productions	Eiji Tsuburaya	Ultraman #1 Ultra Operation No. 1	Tokusatsu Television Show
Frankenstein Jr.	1966 (September 10)	Hanna-Barbera Productions	William Hanna & Joseph Barbera	Frankenstein Jr. and The Impossibles #1 The Shocking Electrical Monster	Cartoon Television Show
The Impossibles (Multi-Man, Coil-Man, Fluid-Man, Big D)	1966 (September 10)	Hanna-Barbera Productions	William Hanna & Joseph Barbera	Frankenstein Jr. and The Impossibles #1 The Bubbler / The Spinner	Cartoon Television Show
The Mighty Heroes (Strong Man, Cuckoo Man, Tornado Man, Rope Man, Diaper Man)	1966 (October 29)	Terrytoons	Ralph Bakshi	The Mighty Heroes #1 The Plastic Blaster	Cartoon Television Show
Space Ghost- Jan, Jace, Blip	1966	Hanna-Barbera Productions	Alex Toth William Hanna & Joseph Barbera	Space Ghost and Dino Boy #1 The Heat Thing	Cartoon Television Show
Kentaro Ataka	1966	Toei		Totsugeki Ken	Tokusatsu TV series
Ken Abe	1966	Toei		Terror Beneath the Sea	Tokusatsu Film
Magma Taishi	1966	P Productions		Ambassador Magma	Tokusatsu TV series
Hyouman	1967	P Productions		Hyouman	Tokusatsu Pilot, not picked up
Jaguarman	1967	P Productions		Jaguarman	Tokusatsu Pilot, not picked up
Captain Nice (Carter Nash)	1967 (January)	NBC Productions	Buck Henry	Captain Nice #1 The Man Who Flies Like A Pigeon	Live Action Television Show
Mister Terrific (Stanley Beamish)	1967 (January)	Universal Television	?	Mister Terrific #1 Matchless	Live Action Television Show
Birdman and the Galaxy Trio (Birdman (Ray Randal), Avenger, Falcon 7, Birdboy, General Stone), Vapor Man, Meteor Man, Gravity Girl, Chief	1967	Hanna-Barbera Productions	Alex Toth William Hanna & Joseph Barbera	Birdman and the Galaxy Trio #1 X the Eliminator / Revolt of the Robots / Morto the Marauder'	Cartoon Television Show
Captain Ultra, Huck, Alien Kikero Joe	1967	Toei		Captain Ultra	Tokusatsu TV series
Ultra Seven (Dan Moroboshi), Seven's Superior	1967 (October 1)	Tsuburaya Productions	Eiji Tsuburaya	Ultra Seven #1 The Invisible Challenger	Tokusatsu Television Show
The Ultra Garrison (Captain Kaoru Kiriyama, Dan Moroboshi, Shigeru Furuhashi, Anne Yuri, Soga, Amagi)	1967 (October 1)	Tsuburaya Productions	Eiji Tsuburaya	Ultra Seven #1 The Invisible Challenger	Tokusatsu Television Show
Esper, Chika	1967			Lightspeed Esper	Tokusatsu TV series
Takeru Ibuki, Nessie	1968	P Productions		Monster Prince	Tokusatsu Television series

=== Comic book ===
Character / Team	Year debuted	Company	Creator/s	First appearance
Aqualad (Garth)	1960 (February)	DC	Robert Bernstein, Ramona Fradon	Adventure Comics #269
Metal Men	1962 (March–April)	DC	Robert Kanigher, Ross Andru	Showcase #37
Justice League	1960 (February)	DC	Gardner Fox	The Brave and the Bold #28
Streaky the Supercat	1960 (February)	DC	Jerry Siegel, Jim Mooney	Action Comics #261
Captain Atom	1960 (March)	Charlton Comics/DC	Joe Gill, Steve Ditko	Space Adventures #33
Elongated Man	1960 (May)	DC	John Broome, Carmine Infantino	The Flash vol. 1 #112
Atomic Knight	1964 (June)	DC	John Broome, Murphy Anderson	Strange Adventures #117
Groot	1960 (November)	Marvel	Stan Lee, Jack Kirby	Tales to Astonish #13
Hawkman (Katar Hol)	1961 (February)	DC	Gardner Fox, Joe Kubert	The Brave and the Bold #34
Star Rovers	1961 (March)	DC	Gardner Fox, Sid Greene	Mystery in Space #66
Super Chief (Flying Stag)	1961 (March)	DC	Gardner Fox, Carmine Infantino	All-Star Western #117
Flygirl	1961 (July)	Archie Comics	Robert Bernstein, John Rosenberger	Adventures of the Fly #13
The Jaguar	1961 (September)	Archie Comics	Robert Bernstein	The Adventures of the Jaguar #1
The Atom (Ray Palmer)	1961 (October)	DC	Julius Schwartz, Gardner Fox, Gil Kane	Showcase #34
Fantastic Four (Mister Fantastic, Invisible Girl, Human Torch (Johnny Storm), the Thing)	1961 (November)	Marvel	Stan Lee, Jack Kirby	The Fantastic Four #1
Ant-Man (Hank Pym)	1962 (January)	Marvel	Stan Lee, Jack Kirby	Tales to Astonish #27
Hulk (Bruce Banner)	1962 (May)	Marvel	Stan Lee, Jack Kirby	The Incredible Hulk #1
Spider-Man (Peter Parker)	1962 (August)	Marvel	Stan Lee, Steve Ditko	Amazing Fantasy #15
Thor (Thor Odinson)	1962 (August)	Marvel	Stan Lee, Jack Kirby	Journey into Mystery #83
Doctor Solar	1962 (October)	Gold Key Comics	Paul S. Newman, Matt Murphy	Doctor Solar, Man of the Atom #1
Wonder Wart-Hog	1962	Underground	Gilbert Shelton	Bacchanal
Magnus, Robot Fighter	1963 (February)	Gold Key Comics	Chase Craig, Russ Manning	Magnus Robot Fighter 4000 A.D. #1
Iron Man (Tony Stark)	1963 (March)	Marvel	Stan Lee, Jack Kirby, Don Heck	Tales of Suspense #39
Doom Patrol (The Chief, Robotman (Cliff Steele), Elasti-Girl (Rita Farr), Negative Man)	1963 (June)	DC	Bob Haney, Arnold Drake, Bruno Premiani	My Greatest Adventure #80
Wasp	1963 (June)	Marvel	Stan Lee, Jack Kirby	Tales to Astonish #44
Doctor Strange (Stephen Strange)	1963 (July)	Marvel	Stan Lee, Steve Ditko	Strange Tales #110
Eclipso	1963 (August)	DC	Bob Haney, Lee Elias	House of Secrets #61
X-Men (Professor X, Cyclops, Angel, Beast, Iceman, Marvel Girl)	1963 (September)	Marvel	Stan Lee, Jack Kirby	X-Men #1
Mera	1963 (September)	DC	Jack Miller, Nick Cardy	Aquaman #11
The Avengers	1963 (September)	Marvel	Stan Lee, Jack Kirby, Dick Ayers	Avengers #1
Sif	1964 (March)	Marvel	Stan Lee, Jack Kirby	Journey into Mystery #102
Quicksilver	1964 (March)	Marvel	Stan Lee, Jack Kirby	X-Men #4
Scarlet Witch	1964 (March)	Marvel	Stan Lee, Jack Kirby	X-Men #4
Black Widow	1964 (April)	Marvel	Stan Lee, Don Rico, Don Heck	Tales of Suspense #52
Daredevil (Matt Murdock)	1964 (April)	Marvel	Stan Lee, Bill Everett	Daredevil #1
Hawkeye (Clint Barton)	1964 (July)	Marvel	Stan Lee, Don Heck	Tales of Suspense #57
Teen Titans	1964 (July)	DC	Robert Haney, Bruno Premiani	The Brave and the Bold #54
Wonder Man	1964 (October)	Marvel	Stan Lee, Jack Kirby	Avengers #9
Zatanna	1964 (November)	DC	Gardner Fox, Murphy Anderson	Hawkman #4
Metamorpho	1965 (January)	DC	Bob Haney, Ramona Fradon	The Brave and the Bold #57
Ka-Zar	1965 (March)	Marvel	Stan Lee, Jack Kirby	The X-Men #10
Hercules	1965 (June)	Marvel	Stan Lee, Jack Kirby	Journey into Mystery Annual #1
Wonder Girl (Donna Troy)	1965 (July)	DC	Bob Haney, Bruno Premiani	The Brave and the Bold #60
Animal Man	1965 (September)	DC	Dave Wood, Carmine Infantino	Strange Adventures #180
Mighty Crusaders	1965	Archie Comics	Jerry Siegel, Paul Reinman	Fly-Man #31
Beast Boy	1965 (November)	DC	Arnold Drake, Bob Brown	Doom Patrol #99
T.H.U.N.D.E.R. Agents	1965 (November)	Tower	Wally Wood	T.H.U.N.D.E.R. Agents #1
Ultra the Multi-Alien	1965 (November)	DC	Dave Wood, Lee Elias	Mystery in Space #103
Inhumans	1965 (December)	Marvel	Stan Lee, Jack Kirby	Fantastic Four #45
Silver Surfer	1966 (March)	Marvel	Jack Kirby	Fantastic Four #48
Black Panther	1966 (July)	Marvel	Stan Lee, Jack Kirby	Fantastic Four #52
Nightshade	1966 (September)	Charlton Comics/DC	Joe Gill, Steve Ditko	Captain Atom #82
Blue Beetle (Ted Kord)	1966 (November)	Charlton Comics/DC	Steve Ditko	Captain Atom #83
Peacemaker	1966 (November)	Charlton Comics/DC	Joe Gill, Pat Boyette	Fightin' 5 #40
B'wana Beast	1967 (January)	DC	Gardner Fox, Carmine Infantino	Showcase #66
Batgirl (Barbara Gordon)	1967 (January)	DC	Bob Haney, Mike Sekowsky	Detective Comics #359
Banshee	1967 (January)	Marvel	Roy Thomas, Werner Roth	X-Men #28
Question	1967 (June)	Charlton Comics/DC	Steve Ditko	Blue Beetle #1
Red Guardian (Alexei Shostakov)	1967 (August)	Marvel	Roy Thomas, John Buscema	The Avengers #43
Changeling	1967 (August)	Marvel	Roy Thomas	The X-Men #35
Deadman	1967 (October)	DC	Arnold Drake, Carmine Infantino	Strange Adventures #205
Black Knight	1967 (December)	Marvel	Roy Thomas, John Buscema	Avengers #47
Captain Marvel (Mar-Vell)	1967 (December)	Marvel	Stan Lee, Gene Colan	Marvel Super Heroes #12
Carol Danvers (a.k.a. Ms. Marvel, Binary, Warbird, Captain Marvel)	1968 (March)	Marvel	Roy Thomas, Gene Colan	Marvel Super Heroes #13
The Creeper	1968 (March)	DC	Steve Ditko	Showcase #73
Green Lantern (Guy Gardner)	1968 (March)	DC	John Broome, Gil Kane	Green Lantern #59
Hawk and Dove	1968 (June)	DC	Steve Ditko, Steve Skeates	Showcase #75
Red Tornado	1968 (August)	DC	Gardner Fox	Justice League of America #64
Vision	1968 (October)	Marvel	Roy Thomas, John Buscema	Avengers #57
Brother Power the Geek	1968 (October)	DC	Joe Simon	Brother Power the Geek #1
Polaris	1968 (October)	Marvel	Arnold Drake, Don Heck, Werner Roth, Jim Steranko	X-Men #49
Wanderers	1968 (December)	DC	Jim Shooter, Win Mortimer	Adventure Comics #375
Guardians of the Galaxy (1st version)	1969 (January)	Marvel	Arnold Drake, Gene Colan	Marvel Super-Heroes #18
Havok	1969 (March)	Marvel	Arnold Drake, Don Heck, Neal Adams	X-Men #54
Nightmaster	1969 (May)	DC	Denny O'Neil, Jerry Grandenetti	Showcase #82
Falcon (Sam Wilson)	1969 (September)	Marvel	Stan Lee, Gene Colan	Captain America #117
Black Canary (Dinah Laurel Lance)	1969 (November)	DC	Dennis O'Neil, Dick Dillin	Justice League of America #75
Stingray	1969 (November)	Marvel	Roy Thomas, Bill Everett	Sub-Mariner #19
Prowler	1969 (November)	Marvel	Stan Lee, John Romita Sr.	The Amazing Spider-Man #78

== 1970s ==
=== Comic book ===
Character / Team	Year debuted	Company	Creator/s	First appearance
Sunfire	1970 (January)	Marvel	Roy Thomas, Don Heck	X-Men #64
Arkon	1970 (April)	Marvel	Roy Thomas, John Buscema	The Avengers #75
Thorn	1970 (October)	DC	Robert Kanigher, Ross Andru	Superman's Girl Friend, Lois Lane #105
Valkyrie	1970 (December)	Marvel	Roy Thomas, John Buscema	The Avengers #83
Tagak the Leopard Lord	1971 (January)	Marvel	Gerry Conway, Gene Colan	Daredevil #72
Squadron Supreme	1971 (February)	Marvel	Roy Thomas, Sal Buscema	The Avengers #85-86
Forever People	1971 (February)	DC	Jack Kirby	The Forever People #1
New Gods	1971 (February)	DC	Jack Kirby	New Gods #1
Orion	1971 (February)	DC	Jack Kirby	New Gods #1
Mister Miracle	1971 (March)	DC	Jack Kirby	Mister Miracle #1
Big Barda	1971 (March)	DC	Jack Kirby	Mister Miracle #4
Man-Thing	1971 (May)	Marvel	Roy Thomas, Gerry Conway, Gray Morrow	Savage Tales #1
Swamp Thing	1971 (July)	DC	Len Wein, Bernie Wrightson	House of Secrets #92
Doc Samson	1971 (July)	Marvel	Roy Thomas, Herb Trimpe	Incredible Hulk (vol. 2) #141
Morbius	1971 (October)	Marvel	Roy Thomas, Gil Kane	The Amazing Spider-Man #101
The Defenders	1971 (December)	Marvel	Roy Thomas	Marvel Feature #1
Green Lantern (John Stewart)	1971-72 (December/January)	DC	Dennis O'Neil, Neal Adams	Green Lantern #87
Werewolf by Night	1972 (February)	Marvel	Roy Thomas, Mike Ploog	Marvel Spotlight #2
Jonah Hex	1972 (March)	DC	John Albano, Tony DeZuniga	All-Star Western #10
Adam Warlock	1972 (April)	Marvel	Roy Thomas, Gil Kane	Marvel Premiere #1
Luke Cage a.k.a. Power Man	1972 (June)	Marvel	Archie Goodwin, George Tuska	Luke Cage, Hero for Hire #1
Namorita	1972 (June)	Marvel	Bill Everett	Sub-Mariner #50
Ghost Rider (Johnny Blaze)	1972 (August)	Marvel	Roy Thomas, Gary Friedrich, Mike Ploog	Marvel Spotlight #5
Etrigan the Demon	1972 (August)	DC	Jack Kirby	The Demon #1
Kamandi	1972 (October)	DC	Jack Kirby	Kamandi, The Last Boy on Earth #1
Thundra	1972 (December)	Marvel	Roy Thomas, John Buscema	Fantastic Four #129
Shanna the She-Devil	1972 (December)	Marvel	Carole Seuling, George Tuska	Shanna the She-Devil #1
Thanos	1973 (February)	Marvel	Jim Starlin Mike Friedrich	The Invincible Iron Man #55
Drax the Destroyer	1973 (February)	Marvel	Mike Friedrich, Jim Starlin	Iron Man #55
Blade	1973 (April)	Marvel	Marv Wolfman, Gene Colan	The Tomb of Dracula #4
Mantis (Marvel Comics)	1973 (June)	Marvel	Steve Englehart, Don Heck	The Avengers #112
Black Orchid	1973 (July)	DC	Sheldon Mayer, Tony DeZuniga	Adventure Comics #428
N'Kantu, the Living Mummy	1973 (August)	Marvel	Steve Gerber, Rich Buckler	Supernatural Thrillers #5
Daimon Hellstrom	1973 (September)	Marvel	Roy Thomas, Gary Friedrich	Ghost Rider #1
Man-Wolf	1973 (September)	Marvel	Gerry Conway, Gil Kane	Amazing Spider-Man #124
Brother Voodoo	1973 (September)	Marvel	Len Wein, Gene Colan	Strange Tales #169
Satana	1973 (October)	Marvel	Roy Thomas, John Romita Sr.	Vampire Tales #2
Wundarr the Aquarian	1973 (October)	Marvel	Steve Gerber, Val Mayerik	Fear #17
Moondragon	1973 (November)	Marvel	Bill Everett, Mike Friedrich, George Tuska	Daredevil (vol 1) #105
Ironwolf	1973 (December)	DC	Howard Chaykin	Weird Worlds #8
Shang-Chi	1973 (December)	Marvel	Steve Englehart, Jim Starlin	Special Marvel Edition #15
Richard Dragon	1974	DC	Dennis O'Neil	Dragon's Fists novel (1974)
Punisher (Frank Castle)	1974 (February)	Marvel	Gerry Conway, Ross Andru	The Amazing Spider-Man #129
Sandman (Garret Sanford)	1974 (March)	DC	Joe Simon, Jack Kirby	Sandman #1
Iron Fist	1974 (May)	Marvel	Roy Thomas, Gil Kane	Marvel Premiere #15
Golem	1974 (June)	Marvel	Len Wein, John Buscema	Strange Tales #174
Tigra	1974 (July)	Marvel	Tony Isabella, Gil Kane	Giant-Size Creatures #1
Deathlok	1974 (August)	Marvel	Rich Buckler, Doug Moench	Astonishing Tales #25
OMAC (Buddy Blank)	1974 (October)	DC	Jack Kirby	OMAC #1
Wolverine	1974 (October)	Marvel	Len Wein, Herb Trimpe	Incredible Hulk #180 (cameo last panel), #181 first full appearance
Vartox	1974 (November)	DC	Cary Bates, Curt Swan	Superman #281
Colleen Wing	1974 (November)	Marvel	Doug Moench, Larry Hama	Marvel Premiere #19
Multiple Man	1975 (February)	Marvel	Len Wein	Giant Size Fantastic Four #4
Misty Knight	1975 (March)	Marvel	Tony Isabella, Arvell Jones	Marvel Premiere#21 #21
Atlas	1975 (April)	DC	Jack Kirby	1st Issue Special #1
Black Goliath	1975 (April)	Marvel	Tony Isabella, George Tuska	Luke Cage, Power Man #24
All-New, All-Different X-Men (Storm, Nightcrawler, Colossus, Thunderbird (John Proudstar))	1975 (May)	Marvel	Len Wein, Dave Cockrum	Giant-Size X-Men #1
Claw the Unconquered	1975 (June)	DC	David Michelinie, Ernie Chan	Claw the Unconquered #1
Gamora	1975 (June)	Marvel	Jim Starlin	Strange Tales #180
Stalker	1975 (July)	DC	Paul Levitz, Steve Ditko	Stalker #1
Captain Canuck	1975 (July)	Comely Comix	Richard Comely, Ron Leishman	Captain Canuck #1
Manhunter (Mark Shaw)	1975 (August)	DC	Jack Kirby	1st Issue Special #5
Moon Knight	1975 (August)	Marvel	Doug Moench, Don Perlin	Werewolf by Night #32
Skull the Slayer	1975 (August)	Marvel	Marv Wolfman, Steve Gan	Skull the Slayer #1
Straw Man	1975 (August)	Marvel	Scott Edelman, Rico Rival	Dead of Night #11
Manphibian	1975 (September)	Marvel	Marv Wolfman, Dave Cockrum	Legion of Monsters #1
Torpedo	1975 (October)	Marvel	Marv Wolfman, John Romita Sr.	Daredevil #126
Prince Wayfinder	1975 (October)	Marvel	Bill Mantlo, Ed Hannigan	Marvel Preview #4
Modred the Mystic	1975 (October)	Marvel	Marv Wolfman, Yong Montano	Marvel Chillers #1
Warlord	1975 (November)	DC	Mike Grell	1st Issue Special #8
Power Girl	1976 (January)	DC	Gerry Conway	All-Star Comics #58
Star-Lord	1976 (January)	Marvel	Steve Englehart, Steve Gan	Marvel Preview #4
Codename: Assassin	1976 (February)	DC	Gerry Conway, Nestor Redondo	1st Issue Special #11
Kobra	1976 (February)	DC	Jack Kirby, Steve Sherman	Kobra #1
Hellcat	1976 (February)	Marvel	Steve Englehart, George Pérez	The Avengers #144
Starman (Mikaal Tomas)	1976 (March)	DC	Gerry Conway, Mike Vosburg	1st Issue Special #12
Omega the Unknown	1976 (March)	Marvel	Steve Gerber, Jim Mooney	Omega the Unknown #1
Jack of Hearts	1976 (March)	Marvel	Bill Mantlo, Keith Giffen	The Deadly Hands of Kung Fu #22
Shroud	1976 (April)	Marvel	Steve Englehart, Herb Trimpe	Super-Villain Team-Up #5
Woodgod	1976 (April)	Marvel	Bill Mantlo, Keith Giffen	Marvel Premiere #31
Ikaris	1976 (July)	Marvel	Jack Kirby	Eternals #1
Captain Britain	1976	Marvel	Chris Claremont, Herb Trimpe	Captain Britain Weekly #1
Starfire (Star Hunters)	1976 (August)	DC	David Michelinie, Mike Vosburg	Starfire #1
Nova (Richard Rider)	1976 (September)	Marvel	Marv Wolfman, John Romita, Sr.	The Man Called Nova #1
Isis (DC Comics) (Andrea Thomas)	1976 (September)	DC	Lou Scheimer, Norm Prescott, Richard Rosenbloom, Marc Richards	Shazam! #25
Ragman	1976 (September)	DC	Robert Kanigher, Joe Kubert	Ragman #1
Sersi	1976 (September)	Marvel	Jack Kirby	The Eternals #3
Bumblebee	1976 (December)	DC	Bob Rozakis	Teen Titans #45
Texas Twister	1976 (December)	Marvel	Roy Thomas, George Pérez	Fantastic Four #177
Captain Ultra	1976 (December)	Marvel	Roy Thomas, George Pérez	Fantastic Four #177
Spider-Woman (Jessica Drew)	1977 (February)	Marvel	Archie Goodwin, Jim Mooney	Marvel Spotlight #32
Black Lightning	1977 (April)	DC	Tony Isabella, Trevor Von Eeden	Black Lightning #1
Starjammers	1977 (April)	Marvel	Dave Cockrum	X-Men #104
3-D Man	1977 (April)	Marvel	Roy Thomas	Marvel Premiere #35
Shade, the Changing Man	1977 (June)	DC	Steve Ditko	Shade the Changing Man #1
Patty Spivot	1977 (September)	DC	Cary Bates, Irv Novick	DC Special Series #1
Gladiator (Kallark)	1977 (October)	Marvel	Chris Claremont, Dave Cockrum	X-Men #107
Paladin	1978 (January)	Marvel	Jim Shooter, Carmine Infantino	Daredevil #150
Guardian	1978 (February)	Marvel	Chris Claremont, John Byrne	X-Men #109
Firestorm (Ronnie Raymond)	1978 (March)	DC	Gerry Conway, Al Milgrom	Firestorm, The Nuclear Man #1
Commander Steel	1978 (March)	DC	Gerry Conway	Steel, The Indestructible Man #1
Devil Dinosaur	1978 (April)	Marvel	Jack Kirby	Devil Dinosaur #1
Holo-Man	1978	Peter Pan Records	Vincent A. Fusco, Donald M. Kasen, Barry Van Name, Jason V. Fusco, Donald White, Joseph Giella and Audrey Hirschfeld	Amazing Adventures of Holo-Man #1
Bug	1979 (January)	Marvel	Bill Mantlo, Michael Golden	Micronauts #1
Solarman	1979 (January)	Pendulum Press	David Oliphant	Solarman: The Beginning #1
Ant-Man (Scott Lang)	1979 (March)	Marvel	David Michelinie, Bob Layton, John Byrne	The Avengers #181
Night Raven	1979 (March)	Marvel	Dez Skinn, David Lloyd	Hulk Comic #1
Cassie Lang	1979 (April)	Marvel	David Michelinie, John Byrne	Marvel Premiere #47
Alpha Flight (Aurora, Northstar, Shaman, Snowbird, Sasquatch)	1979 (April)	Marvel	Chris Claremont, John Byrne	Uncanny X-Men #120
Black Cat	1979 (July)	Marvel	Marv Wolfman, Keith Pollard	The Amazing Spider-Man #194
Captain Universe	1979 (August)	Marvel	Bill Mantlo	Micronauts #8
El Aguila	1979 (August)	Marvel	Dave Cockrum	Power Man and Iron Fist #58
She-Hulk	1979 (November)	Marvel	Stan Lee, John Buscema	Savage She-Hulk #1
Odd Man	1979 (December)	DC	Steve Ditko	Detective Comics #487

=== Film ===
Character / Team / Series	Year Debuted	Creator/s	First Appearance
As	1971	Andrzej Kondratiuk	Hydrozagadka
Infra-Man	1975	Ni Kuang	The Super Inframan
Supersonic Man	1979	Tonino Moi	Supersonic Man

=== Television ===
Character / Team / Series	Year Debuted	Creator/s	First Appearance
El Chapulín Colorado	1970	Roberto Gomez Bolaños	Chespirito (segment: El Chapulín Colorado)
Spectreman	1971 (January 2)	Daiji Kazumine, Tomio Sagisu	Spectreman
Kamen Rider 1, Kamen Rider 2	1971	Shotaro Ishinomori	Kamen Rider
Ultraman Jack	1971	Tsuburaya Productions	The Return of Ultraman
Andro Mask	1971	Shotaro Ishinomori	We Love You! We Love You! Witch Teacher
Mirrorman	1971	Tsuburaya Productions	Mirrorman
Silver Kamen	1971	Senkosha	Silver Kamen
G-Force	1972		Kagaku ninja tai Gatchaman (Battle of the Planets)
Ultraman Ace, Father of Ultra	1972	Tsuburaya Productions	Ultraman Ace
Barom-1	1972	Toei	Chojin Barom One
Ninja Arashi, Tsukinowa	1972	Toei	Henshin Ninja Arashi
Kikaider	1972	Toei	Android Kikaider
Redman	1972	Tsuburaya Productions	Redman
Red Fighter, Green Fighter, Orange Fighter, Triple Fighter	1972	Tsuburaya Productions	Triple Fighter
Jumborg Ace, Jumborg Nine	1972	Tsuburaya Productions	Jumborg Ace
Godman	1972	Toho	Ike! Godman
Dash 1, Dash 2, Dash 3, Dash 4, Dash 5, Dash 6, Rainbowman	1972	Toho	Warrior of Love Rainbowman
Iron King	1972	Senkosha	Iron King
Thunder Mask	1972	Toyo Agency	Thunder Mask
Lion Maru	1972	P Productions	Kai Ketsu Lion-Maru
Six Million Dollar Man	1973 (March 7)	Martin Caidin	The Six Million Dollar Man movie (based on 1972 novel Cyborg)
Ultraman Taro, Mother of Ultra	1973	Tsuburaya Productions	Ultraman Taro
Inazuman, Sanagiman	1973	Shotaro Ishinomori	Inazuman
Kikaider 01, Binder	1973	Toei	Kikaider 01
Robot Detective	1973	Shotaro Ishinomori	Robot Detective
Fireman	1973	Tsuburaya Productions	Fireman
Kamen Rider V3, Riderman	1973	Shotaro Ishinomori	Kamen Rider V3
Wendy, Marvin, Wonder Dog	1973	Hanna-Barbera	Super Friends
Zone Fighter	1973	Toho	Meteor Man Zone
Greenman	1973	Toho	Ike! Greenman
Diamond Eye	1973	Toho	Diamond Eye
Red Baron	1973	Senkosha	Super Robot Red Baron
Ninja Ginga, Ninja Susei, Ninja Gekko, Mitsurugi	1973	Kokusai Films	Majin Hunter Mitsurugi
Fuun-Lion Maru, Tiger Joe Jr.	1973	P Productions	Fuun Lion-Maru
Tiger Seven	1973	P Productions	Tetsujin Tiger Seven
Ultraman Leo, Astra, Ultraman King	1974	Tsuburaya Productions	Ultraman Leo
Kamen Rider X	1974	Shotaro Ishinomori	Kamen Rider X
Kamen Rider Amazon, Mole Beastman	1974	Shotaro Ishinomori	Kamen Rider Amazon
Kotaro Ushiwaka, Nyudo, Uragira	1974	Toho	Ike! Kotaro Ushiwaka!
Mach Baron	1974	Senkosha	Super Robot Mach Baron
Zaborger	1974	P Productions	Denjin Zaborger
Gorenger	1975	Shotaro Ishinomori	Himitsu Sentai Gorenger
Condorman	1975	Toei	Warrior of Justice: Condorman
The Bionic Woman	1975 (March 16)	Kenneth Johnson	The Six Million Dollar Man (episode: "The Bionic Woman")
Xavitan, Evil, Gabra, Darunia	1975	Shotaro Ishinomori	Akumaizer 3
Isis (DC Comics)	1975 (September 6)		The Secrets of Isis (episode: "The Lights of Mystery Mountain")
Kamen Rider Stronger, Tackle	1975	Shotaro Ishinomori	Kamen Rider Stronger
Blue Falcon and Dynomutt	1976 (September 11)	Joe Ruby and Ken Spears	Dynomutt, Dog Wonder (episode: “Everyone Hyde!”)
Kagestar, Bellestar	1976	Toei	The Kagestar
Skyzel, Grounzel, Gonbesu GA-49	1976	Toei	Space Ironman Kyodain
Captor 1, Captor 2, Captor 3, Captor 4, Captor 5, Captor 6, Captor 7	1976	Toei	Ninja Captor
Bibyun, Bashaan, Zusheen, Shindo, Birin	1976	Shotaro Ishinomori	Choujin Bibyun
Azteckaiser	1976	Tsuburaya Productions	Pro-Wres no Hoshi Aztecaser
Bankid Pegasus, Bankid Dragon, Bankid Swan, Bankid Ox, Bankid Rabbit	1976	Toho	Enban Sensō Bankid
Battle Hawk, Big Hawk, Queen Hawk	1976	Go Nagai/Dynamic Productions	Battle Hawk
Izenman, Izenbo	1977	Tsuburaya Productions	Dinosaur War Izenborg
Zubat	1977	Shotaro Ishinomori	Kaiketsu Zubat
Saburo Minami, Daitetsujin 17	1977	Shotaro Ishinomori	Daitetsujin 17
Spade Ace, Heart Queen, Dia Jack, Clover King, Big One	1977	Toei	J.A.K.Q. Dengekitai
Rima the Jungle Girl, Apache Chief, Black Vulcan, Samurai, Wonder Twins, Gleek	1977	Hanna Barbera	Super Friends
Phantom, Shooting Star, Tonto, Sofia, Ape-Man Ballou	1978	Toei	Message from Space: Galactic Wars
Koseider	1978	Tsuburaya Productions	Dinosaur Squadron Koseidon
Skyrider	1979	Shotaro Ishinomori	Kamen Rider Skyrider
Battle Japan, Battle Cossack, Battle France, Battle Kenya, Miss America	1979	Toei, Marvel	Battle Fever J
Megaloman	1979	Toho	Megaloman
Silver Jaguar, Princess Love	1979	P Productions	Silver Jaguar

== 1980s ==
=== Comic book ===
Character / Team	Year Debuted	Company	Creator/s	First Appearance
Kitty Pryde	1980 (January)	Marvel	Chris Claremont, John Byrne	Uncanny X-Men #129
Emma Frost	1980 (January)	Marvel	Chris Claremont, John Byrne	Uncanny X-Men #129
Dazzler	1980 (February)	Marvel	Tom DeFalco, Louise Simonson, Roger Stern	Uncanny X-Men #130
Dragon Lord (Tako Shamara)	1980 (March)	Marvel	Marv Wolfman, Steve Ditko	Marvel Spotlight (vol. 2) #5
Mockingbird	1980 (July)	Marvel	Len Wein	Marvel Team-Up #95
Vindicator	1980 (August)	Marvel	Chris Claremont, John Byrne	Uncanny X-Men #139
Nemesis	1980 (September)	DC	Cary Burkett, Dan Spiegle	The Brave and the Bold #166
Cyborg	1980 (October)	DC	Marv Wolfman, George Pérez	DC Comics Presents #26
Raven	1980 (October)	DC	Marv Wolfman, George Pérez	DC Comics Presents #26
Starfire	1980 (October)	DC	Marv Wolfman, George Pérez	DC Comics Presents #26
Elektra	1981 (January)	Marvel	Frank Miller	Daredevil #168
Omega Men	1981 (January)	DC	Marv Wolfman, Joe Staton	Green Lantern #136
Dragon Lord (Ral Dorn)	1981 (June)	Marvel	Ed Hannigan, Steve Ditko	Fantastic Four Annual #16
Vixen	1981 (July)	DC	Gerry Conway, Bob Oksner	Action Comics #521
Arak	1981 (August)	DC	Roy Thomas, Ernie Colón	The Warlord #48
Captain Victory and the Galactic Rangers	1981 (November)	Pacific Comics	Jack Kirby	Captain Victory and the Galactic Rangers #1
Rogue	1981 (November)	Marvel	Chris Claremont, Michael Golden	Avengers Annual #10
Cloak and Dagger	1982 (March)	Marvel	Bill Mantlo, Ed Hannigan	Peter Parker, the Spectacular Spider-Man #64
The Rocketeer	1982 (March)	Pacific	Dave Stevens	Starslayer #2
Rocket Raccoon	1982 (May)	Marvel	Bill Mantlo, Keith Giffen	Incredible Hulk #271
Arion	1982 (March)	DC	Paul Kupperberg, Jan Duursema	Warlord #55
Monitor (Mar Novu)	1982 (July)	DC	Marv Wolfman, George Perez	The New Teen Titans Vol.1 #71
Vigilante (Adrian Chase)	1982 (September)	DC	Marv Wolfman, George Perez	The New Teen Titans Annual #2
Ambush Bug	1982 (December)	DC	Keith Giffen	DC Comics Presents #52
Monica Rambeau (a.k.a. Captain Marvel, Photon, Pulsar, Spectrum)	1982 (December)	Marvel	Roger Stern, John Romita, Jr.	The Amazing Spider-Man Annual #16
New Mutants	1982 (December)	Marvel	Chris Claremont	The New Mutants, Marvel Graphic Novel #4
Amethyst, Princess of Gemworld	1983 (April)	DC	Dan Mishkin, Gary Cohn, Ernie Colón	Legion of Super-Heroes #298
Harbinger	1983 (July)	DC	Marv Wolfman, George Pérez	New Teen Titans Annual #2
Infinity, Inc.	1983 (September)	DC	Roy Thomas, Jerry Ordway, Mike Machlan	All-Star Squadron #25
Atom Smasher	1983 (September)	DC	Roy Thomas, Jerry Ordway, Mike Machlan	All-Star Squadron #25
Magik	1983 (December)	Marvel	Chris Claremont, Sal Buscema	Magik (Storm and Illyana) #1
Jason Todd	1983 (March)	DC	Jim Starlin, Max Collins	Batman #357
Lobo	1983 (June)	DC	Roger Slifer, Keith Giffen	Omega Men #3
Outsiders	1983 (July)	DC	Mike Barr, Jim Aparo	The Brave and the Bold #200
Geo-Force	1983 (July)	DC	Mike Barr, Jim Aparo	The Brave and the Bold #200
Katana	1983 (July)	DC	Mike Barr, Jim Aparo	The Brave and the Bold #200
Halo	1983 (July)	DC	Mike Barr, Jim Aparo	The Brave and the Bold #200
Amazing Man	1983 (July)	DC	Roy Thomas, Jerry Ordway	All-Star Squadron #23
Badger	1983 (July)	First Comics IDW Publishing Image Comics Dark Horse Comics	Mike Barron	Badger #1
Beta Ray Bill	1983 (November)	Marvel	Walt Simonson	The Mighty Thor #337
Atari Force	1984 (January)	DC	Gerry Conway, Roy Thomas, Ross Andru	Atari Force #1
Felicity Smoak	1984 (May)	DC	Gerry Conway, Rafael Kayanan	The Fury of Firestorm #23
Teenage Mutant Ninja Turtles	1984 (May)	Mirage	Kevin Eastman, Peter Laird	Teenage Mutant Ninja Turtles #1
Blue Devil	1984 (June)	DC	Dan Mishkin, Gary Cohn	Fury of Firestorm #24
Jericho	1984 (June)	DC	Marv Wolfman, George Pérez	Tales of the Teen Titans #43
Power Pack	1984 (August)	Marvel	Louise Simonson, June Brigman	Power Pack #1
West Coast Avengers	1984 (September)	Marvel	Roger Stern, Bob Hall	West Coast Avengers #1
Femforce	1984 (September)	AC Comics	Bill Black, Stephanie Sanderson, Mark Heike	Femforce Special
Vibe	1984 (October)	DC	Gerry Conway, Chuck Patton	Justice League of America Annual #2
Gypsy	1984 (October)	DC	Gerry Conway, Chuck Patton	Justice League of America Annual #2
Julia Carpenter (a.k.a. Spider-Woman, Arachne)	1984 (October)	Marvel	Jim Shooter, Mike Zeck	Secret Wars #6-7
Box (Madison Jeffries)	1984 (November)	Marvel	John Byrne	Alpha Flight #16
Northguard	1984	[Canada]	Mark Shainblum, Gabriel Morrissette	New Triumph featuring Northguard #1
Zot	1984	Eclipse Comics	Scott McCloud	Zot! #1
Mr. Monster	1984		Michael T. Gilbert	Vanguard Illustrated #7
She-Ra	1984	Mattell	Larry DiTillio and J. Michael Straczynski	The Story of She-ra
Wildcat (Yolanda Montez)	1985 (March)	DC	Roy Thomas, Dannette Thomas, Don Newton	Infinity Inc. #12
Firestar	1985 (May)	Marvel	Dan Spiegle, Christy Marx	Uncanny X-Men #193
Longshot	1985 (September)	Marvel	Ann Nocenti, Art Adams	Longshot #1
Beth Chapel	1985 (October)	DC	Roy Thomas, Todd McFarlane	Infinity Inc. #19
Hourman (Rick Tyler)	1985 (November)	DC	Roy Thomas, Dann Thomas, Todd McFarlane	Infinity, Inc. #20
Looker	1985 (November)	DC	Mike W. Barr, Jim Aparo	The Outsiders #1
Fleur de Lys	1985	[Canada]	Mark Shainblum, Gabriel Morrissette	New Triumph featuring Northguard #5
Nagraj	1986 (January)	Raj Comics	Sanjay Gupta	Nagraj #1
X-Factor	1986 (February)	Marvel	Bob Layton, Jackson Guice, Josef Rubinstein	X-Factor #1
Booster Gold	1986 (February)	DC	Dan Jurgens	Booster Gold #1
Savage Dragon	1986 (February)		Erik Larsen	Megaton #3
Kilowog	1986 (June)	DC	Steve Englehart, Joe Staton	Green Lantern Corps #201
Tick	1986 (July)	New England Comics	Ben Edlund	New England Comics Newsletter #14
Watchmen (Ozymandias, Silk Spectre, Doctor Manhattan, Comedian, Nite Owl, Rorschach)	1986 (September)	DC	Alan Moore, Dave Gibbons	Watchmen #1
Kara Killgrave (Persuasion, Purple Girl/Woman)	1986 (December)	Marvel	Bill Mantlo, David Ross	Alpha Flight #41
Manikin	1987 (February)	Marvel	Bill Mantlo, David Ross	Alpha Flight #43
Super Commando Dhruva	1987 (April)	Raj Comics	Anupam Sinha	GENL #74 Pratishodh Ki Jwala
Gangbuster	1987 (May)	DC	Marv Wolfman, Jerry Ordway	Adventures of Superman #428
Wild Dog	1987 (September)	DC	Max Allan Collins, Terry Beatty	Wild Dog #1
Ghost	1987 (June)	Marvel	David Michelinie, Bob Layton	Iron Man #219
Black Thorn	1987 (September)	DC	Paul Kupperberg, Tod Smith	Vigilante #45
Speedball	1988 (January)	Marvel	Tom Defalco, Steve Ditko	The Amazing Spider-Man Annual #22
Excalibur	1988 (April)	Marvel	Chris Claremont, Alan Davis	Excalibur: The Sword is Drawn
Battlestar	1988 (May)	Marvel	Mark Gruenwald, Paul Neary	Captain America #341
The Crow	1989 (January)	Caliber	James O'Barr	Caliber Presents #1
U.S. Agent	1989 (June)	Marvel	Mark Gruenwald, Paul Neary	Captain America #354
Robin (Tim Drake)	1989 (August)	DC	Marv Wolfman	Batman #436
Maxima	1989 (September)	DC	Roger Stern, George Pérez	Action Comics #645
New Warriors	1989 (December)	Marvel	Tom DeFalco, Ron Frenz	Thor #411
Dawn	1989 (December)	Cry for Dawn Productions	Joseph Michael Linsner	Cry for Dawn #1

=== Film ===
Character / Team / Series	Year Debuted	Creator/s	First Appearance
Kamen Rider ZX	1984	Toei/Shotaro Ishinomori	Birth of the 10th! Kamen Riders All Together!!
RoboCop	1987	Edward Neumeier, Michael Miner	RoboCop

=== Television ===
Character / Team / Series	Year Debuted	Creator/s	First Appearance
Ultraman 80, Yulian	1980	Tsuburaya Productions	Ultraman 80
Denziman	1980	Toei	Denshi Sentai Denjiman
Kamen Rider Super 1	1980	Toei/Shotaro Ishinomori	Kamen Rider Super-1
Ralph Hinkley	1981 (March)		The Greatest American Hero
Firestar	1981 (September)		Spider-Man and His Amazing Friends
Andro Melos, Andro Wolf, Andro Floru, Andro Mars	1981	Tsuburaya Productions	Andro Melos
Sun Vulcan	1981	Toei	Taiyo Sentai Sun Vulcan
Gavan	1982	Toei	Space Sheriff Gavan
El Dorado	1982	Hanna-Barbera	Super Friends
Goggle-V	1982	Toei	Dai Sentai Goggle-V
Sharivan	1983	Toei	Space Sheriff Sharivan
Dynaman	1983	Toei	Kagaku Sentai Dynaman
Shaider	1984	Toei	Space Sheriff Shaider
Machineman, Ballboy	1984	Toei	Seiven Kamen Machineman
Bioman	1984	Toei	Choudenshi Bioman
ThunderCats	1985	Tobin "Ted" Wolf & Rankin/Bass Productions	ThunderCats
Byclosser Ken, Byclosser Gin	1985	Toei	Kyoudai Ken Byclosser
Juspion	1985	Toei	MegaBeast Investigator Juspion
Changeman	1985	Toei	Dengeki Sentai Changeman
Silverhawks	1986	Rankin/Bass Productions	SilverHawks
Spielban, Helen Lady, Diana Lady	1986	Toei	Dimensional Warrior Spielban
Flashman	1986	Toei	Choushinsei Flashman
TigerSharks	1987	Rankin/Bass Productions	TigerSharks
Ultraman Scott, Ultraman Chuck, Ultrawoman Beth	1987	Tsuburaya Productions/Hanna Barbera	Ultraman: The Adventure Begins
Metalder	1987	Toei	Choujinki Metalder
Maskman	1987	Toei	Hikari Sentai Maskman
Kamen Rider Black	1987	Toei/Shotaro Ishinomori	Kamen Rider Black
Jiraiya	1988	Toei	Sekai Ninja Sen Jiraiya
Liveman	1988	Toei	Choujyu Sentai Liveman
Jupiter, Mars, Saturn, Mercury, Lucifer	1988	Toho	Dennou Keisatsu Cybercop
Turboranger	1989	Toei	Kousoku Sentai Turboranger
Jiban	1989	Toei	Kidou Keiji Jiban

=== Video games ===
Character / Team / Series	Year Debuted	Company	Creator/s	First Appearance
Dami-chan	1984	Taito	?	Ben Bero Beh Arcade
Flashgal	1985	Kyuga	?	Flashgal Arcade
Mega Man / Rock Man (Mega / Rock)	1987	Capcom	Akira Kitamura	Mega Man / Rock Man NES
Space Sheriff Cyber Cross / Buso Keiji Saiba Kurosu	1989	ITL Co.	Face Corporation	Space Sheriff Cyber Cross / Buso Keiji Saiba Kurosu PC Engine

=== Other media ===
Character / Team / Series	Year Debuted	Company	Creator/s	First Appearance
Jan Tenner	1980	Kiddinx / Zauberstern	H. G. Francis	Jan Tenner – Classic
He-Man	1982	Mattel	Roger Sweet	Masters of the Universe

== 1990s ==
=== Comic book ===
Character / Team	Year Debuted	Company	Creator/s	First Appearance
Cable	1990 (March)	Marvel	Louise Simonson, Rob Liefeld	The New Mutants #87 X-Men #201 (January 1986, as Nathan Summers)
Gambit	1990 (August)	Marvel	Chris Claremont, Jim Lee	X-Men #266
Bhokal	1991 (January)	Raj Comics	Sanjay Gupta	Bhokal #1
Darkhawk	1991 (February)	Marvel	Tom Defalco, Mike Manley	Marvel Age #97
Deadpool	1991 (February)	Marvel	Rob Liefeld, Fabian Nicieza	The New Mutants #98
X-Force	1991 (April)	Marvel	Rob Liefeld	The New Mutants #100
Sleepwalker	1991 (June)	Marvel	Bob Budiansky, Bret Blevins	Sleepwalker #1
Next Men	1991 (September)	Dark Horse	John Byrne	Dark Horse Presents #54
Agent Liberty	1991 (October)	DC	Dan Jurgens	Superman #60
Parmanu	1991 (October)	Raj Comics	Sanjay Gupta	Nagraj and Super Commando Dhruva #1
Bishop	1991 (November)	Marvel	Whilce Portacio Jim Lee	X-Men #282
Spawn	1992 (May)	Image	Todd McFarlane	Spawn #1
Cyan Fitzgerald/Misery	1992	Image	Todd Mcarlane	Spawn #3
Sherlee Johnson	1992	Image	Todd Mcfarlane	Spawn #5
War Machine	1992 (June)	Marvel	Len Kaminski, Kev Hopgood	Iron Man #281
Eternal Warrior	1992 (June)	Valiant Comics	Jim Shooter	Solar: Man of the Atom #10
Jesse Quick	1992 (August)	DC	Len Strazewski, Mike Parobeck	Justice Society of America (vol. 2) #1
WildC.A.T.s (Grifter, Emp, Maul, Spartan, Void, Voodoo, Warblade, Zealot)	1992 (August )	Image Comics	Jim Lee	"WildC.A.T.s" #1
Supreme	1992 (August)	Image	Rob Liefeld	Youngblood #3
Heckler	1992 (September)	DC	Keith Giffen	The Heckler #1
Azrael	1992 (October)	DC	Dennis O'Neil Joe Quesada	Batman: Sword of Azrael #1
Darkstars	1992 (October)	DC	Michael Jan Friedman, Larry Stroman	Darkstars #1
Doga	1992 (November)	Raj Comics	Tarunkumar Wahi, Sanjay Gupta and Manu	Curfew
Stormwatch	1993 (March)	Image	Jim Lee	Stormwatch #1
Hardware	1993 (February)	DC	Dwayne McDuffie, Denys Cowan	Hardware #1
The Maxx	1993 (March)	Comico	Sam Kieth	Primer #5 (as Max the Hare), The Maxx #1 (as The
Blood Syndicate	1993 (April)	DC	Dwayne McDuffie, Denys Cowan, Ivan Velez Jr.	Blood Syndicate #1
Icon and Rocket	1993 (May)	DC	Dwayne McDuffie, M.D. Bright	Icon #1
Static	1993 (June)	DC	Dwayne McDuffie, John Paul Leon	Static #1
Steel (John Henry Irons)	1993 (June)	DC	Louise Simonson, Jon Bogdanove	The Adventures of Superman #500
Superboy (Conner Kent)	1993 (June)	DC	Karl Kesel, Tom Grummett	The Adventures of Superman #500
Medieval Spawn	1993	Image	Todd Mcfarlane	Spawn #9
Hellboy	1993 (August)	Dark Horse	Mike Mignola	San Diego Comic Con Comics #2
Gen^{13}	1993 (September)	Image	Jim Lee, Brandon Choi	Deathmate #Black
Prime	1993	Malibu Comics	Gerard Jones, Len Strazewski, Norm Breyfogle	Prime #1
Bheriya	1994 (January)	Raj Comics	Dheeraj Verma	Bheriya #1
Green Lantern (Kyle Rayner)	1994 (January)	DC	Ron Marz, Darryl Banks	Green Lantern #48
Xombi	1994 (January)	DC	Denys Cowan, John Rozum	Xombi #0
Purgatori	1994	Chaos! Comics	Brian Pulido, Steven Hughes	Lady Death #3
Generation X	1994	Marvel	Scott Lobdell, Chris Bachalo	X-Men #318
Starman (Jack Knight)	1994	DC	James Robinson, Tony Harris	Zero Hour #1
Impulse	1994 (June)	DC	Mark Waid, Mike Wieringo	The Flash #91 (cameo), The Flash #92 (full)
Green Arrow (Connor Hawke)	1994 (October)	DC	Kelley Puckett, Jim Aparo	Green Arrow vol. 2, #0
Jack Flag	1994 (December)	Marvel	Mark Gruenwald, Dave Hoover	Captain America #434
XS	1994 (October)	DC	Tom McCraw, Jeff Moy	Legionnaires #0
Astro City	1995	Image	Kurt Busiek, Brent Anderson	Astro City #1
Mr. Hero the Newmatic Man	1995		Neil Gaiman, James Vance, Ted Slampyak	Neil Gaiman's Mr. Hero, The Newmatic Man #1
Nate Grey (X-Man)	1995 (March)	Marvel	Jeph Loeb, Steve Skroce	X-Man #1
Wonder Girl (Cassandra Sandsmark)	1996 (January)	DC	John Byrne	Wonder Woman (vol. 2) #105
Takion	1996 (June)	DC	Paul Kupperberg, Aaron Lopresti	Takion #1
The Thunderbolts	1997	Marvel	Kurt Busiek, Mark Bagley	The Incredible Hulk #449
Jessica Priest	1997	Image Comics	Todd Mcfarlane	Spawn #61
Yelena Belova	1999 (March)	Marvel	Devin Grayson, J.G. Jones	Inhumans #5
Stargirl	1999	DC	Geoff Johns, Lee Moder, David S. Goyer	Stars and S.T.R.I.P.E. #0
The Authority	1999	Wildstorm/DC	Warren Ellis, Bryan Hitch	The Authority vol. 1 #1

=== Manga/Anime ===
Character / Team / Series	Year Debuted	Creator/s	First Appearance
Hentai Kamen	1992	Keishū Ando	Kyūkyoku!! Hentai Kamen

=== Film ===
Character / Team / Series	Year Debuted	Creator/s	First Appearance
Kamen Rider Shin	1992	Toei/Shotaro Ishinomori	Shin Kamen Rider: Prologue
Meteor Man	1993		The Meteor Man
Kamen Rider ZO	1993	Toei/Shotaro Ishinomori	Kamen Rider ZO
Kamen Rider J	1994	Toei/Shotaro Ishinomori	Kamen Rider J
Ultraman Zearth	1996	Tsuburaya Productions	Ultraman Zearth

=== Television ===
Character / Team / Series	Year Debuted	Creator/s	First Appearance
Fire, Bikel, Walter	1990	Toei	Special Rescue Police Winspector
Fiveman	1990	Toei	Chikyu Sentai Fiveman
SolBraver, SolJeanne, Soldozer, Knight Fire	1991	Toei	Super Rescue Solbrain
Jetman	1991	Toei	Chojin Sentai Jetman
Darkwing Duck	1992	Tad Stones	Darkwing Duck
Zyuranger	1992	Toei	Kyoryu Sentai Zyuranger
T-REX	1992	Lee Gunther & Michael Wehl	The Adventures of T-Rex
Draft Redder, SyncRedder, Draft Blues, Draft Keace	1992	Toei	Special Rescue Exceedraft
Power Rangers	1993	Haim Saban	Mighty Morphin Power Rangers
Gridman, Dyna Dragon, God Xenon	1993	Tsuburaya Productions	Gridman the Hyper Agent
Janperson	1993	Toei	Tokusou Robo Janperson
Dairanger	1993	Toei	Gosei Sentai Dairanger
VR Troopers	1994	Haim Saban	VR Troopers
Show, Sara, Sig, Gold Platinum	1994	Toei	Blue SWAT
Kakuranger, Ninjaman	1994	Toei	Ninja Sentai Kakuranger
The Street Sharks	1994	Mattel/DiC Productions	Street Sharks
Ultraman Powered	1995	Tsuburaya Productions	Ultraman: The Ultimate Hero
Masked Rider	1995	Haim Saban	Masked Rider
Blue Beet, G-Stag, Reddle, Kabuto	1995	Toei	Jyuko Beetle Fighter
OhRanger, Daimajin	1995	Toei	Chouriki Sentai Ohranger
Beetleborgs	1996	Haim Saban	Big Bad Beetleborgs
Ultraman Tiga	1996	Tsuburaya Productions	Ultraman Tiga
Changerion, The Blader, Rikushinki, Kuuretsuki, Houjinki	1996	Toei	Choukou Senshi Changéríon
Kabuto, Kuwagar, Tentou, Yanma, Genji, Min, Ageha	1996	Toei	B-Fighter Kabuto
Carranger, Signalman	1996	Toei	Gekisou Sentai Carranger
Extreme Dinosaurs	1996	Mattel/DiC Productions	Extreme Dinosaurs
Astralborgs	1997	Haim Saban	Beetleborgs Metallix
Ultraman Dyna	1997	Tsuburaya Productions	Ultraman Dyna
Shaktimaan	1997	Mukesh Khanna	Shaktimaan
Megaranger	1997	Toei	Denji Sentai Megaranger
The Mummies	1997	DiC Productions	Mummies Alive!
Captain Vyom	1998	Ketan Mehta	Captain Vyom
Ultraman Gaia, Ultraman Agul	1998	Tsuburaya Productions	Ultraman Gaia
Gingaman, Black Knight	1998	Toei	Seijuu Sentai Gingaman
Mermaid Man, Barnacle Boy	1999	Stephen Hillenburg	Mermaid Man and Barnacle Boy (SpongeBob SquarePants)
Ultraman Nice	1999	Tsuburaya Productions	Ultraman Nice Commercials
GoGoFive	1999	Toei	Kyuukyuu Sentai GoGoFive

== 2000s ==
=== Comic book ===
Character / Team	Year Debuted	Company	Creator/s	First Appearance
Black Fox (Dr. Robert William Paine)	2000	Marvel	Roger Stern, John Byrne	Marvel: The Lost Generation #12
Buzz	2000	Marvel	Tom DeFalco, Ron Frenz	Spider-Girl #18
Night Eagle	2000	DC	J.M. DeMatteis, Mike Miller	The Adventures of Superman #586
Sentry	2000	Marvel	Paul Jenkins, Jae Lee, Rick Veitch	The Sentry #1
Typeface	2000	Marvel	Paul Jenkins, Mark Buckingham	Peter Parker: Spider-Man v2 #23
Acrata (Andrea Rojas)	2000 (August)	DC	Oscar Pinto, Giovanni Barberi, F.G. Haghenbeck	Superman Annual (vol.2) #12
Speedy (Mia Dearden)	2001 (May)	DC	Kevin Smith, Phil Hester	Green Arrow (vol.3) #2
Orpheus	2001	DC	Alex Simmons, Dwayne Turner	Batman: Orpheus Rising #1
Spike	2001	Marvel	Peter Milligan, Mike Allred	X-Force #121
Ultimate Marvel characters	2001	Marvel	various	Ultimate Spider-Man #1
X-Statix	2001	Marvel	Peter Milligan, Mike Allred	X-Force #116
X-Treme X-Men	2001	Marvel	Chris Claremont	X-Treme X-Men #1
Fantomex	2002	Marvel	Grant Morrison, Igor Kordey	New X-Men #128
Runaways	2002	Marvel	Brian K. Vaughan, Adrian Alphona	Runaways vol. 1 #1
Tech Jacket	2002	Image	Robert Kirkman, E.J. Su	Tech Jacket #1
Invincible	2002	Image	Robert Kirkman, Cory Walker	Noble Causes: Family Secrets #3
Gunslinger Spawn	2002	Image Comics	Todd Mcfarlane	Spawn #119
Super Buddies	2003	DC	Keith Giffen, J. M. DeMatteis, Kevin Maguire, Joe Rubinstein	Formerly Known as the Justice League #1
X-23	2003	Marvel	Craig Kyle	NYX #3
Anya Corazon	2004	Marvel	Fiona Avery, Mark Brooks	Amazing Fantasy vol. 2 #1
Doc Frankenstein	2004		Geof Darrow, Steve Skroce, the Wachowskis	Doc Frankenstein #1
Freakshow	2004	Marvel	Chris Claremont	Excalibur vol. 3 #1
Firestorm (Jason Rusch)	2004 (July)	DC	Dan Jolley, ChrisCross	Firestorm (vol. 3) #1
Hawkeye (Kate Bishop)	2005 (April)	Marvel	Allan Heinberg, Jim Cheung	Young Avengers #1
Shuri	2005 (May)	Marvel	Reginald Hudlin, John Romita Jr.	Black Panther #2
Young Avengers	2005	Marvel	Allan Heinberg, Jim Cheung	Young Avengers #1
SuperFuckers	2005	Top Shelf Productions	James Kochalka	SuperF*ckers #1
Batwoman (Kate Kane)	2006 (August)	DC	Geoff Johns, Grant Morrison, Greg Rucka, Mark Waid, Keith Giffen	52 (comics) #7
Robin (Damian Wayne)	2006 (September)	DC	Grant Morrison, Andy Kubert	Batman #655
Blue Beetle (Jaime Reyes)	2006	DC	Keith Giffen, John Rogers, Cully Hamner	Infinite Crisis #5
Crimson Chin	2006		Butch Hartman	The Fairly OddParents #1
Miss Martian	2006	DC	Geoff Johns, Tony Daniel	Teen Titans vol. 3, #37
Cyclone (Maxine Hunkel)	December 2006	DC	Mark Waid, Alex Ross, Geoff Johns, Dale Eaglesham	Justice Society of America vol.3 #1
The 99	2007	Teshkeel Comics	Naif Al-Mutawa	The 99 #1
Atomic Robo	2007		Brian Clevinger, Scott Wegener	Atomic Robo #46
Bob, Agent of Hydra	2007	Marvel	Fabian Nicieza	Cable & Deadpool #38
Forerunner	2007	DC	Jimmy Palmiotti, Justin Gray, Jesus Saiz.	Countdown #46
2-D	2007 (December)	Marvel	Dan Slott, Christos N. Gage, Patrick Scherberger	Avengers: The Initiative Annual #1
Anna Mercury	2008		Warren Ellis	Anna Mercury #1
Blue Marvel	2008	Marvel	Kevin Grevioux	Adam: Legend of the Blue Marvel #1
Kick-Ass	2008	Marvel/Icon	Mark Millar	Kick-Ass #1
Hit-Girl	2008	Marvel/Icon.	Mark Millar	Kick-Ass #3
She-Hulk (Lyra)	2008	Marvel	Jeff Parker, Mitch Breitweiser	Hulk: Raging Thunder #1
Guardians of the Galaxy 2nd version	2008 (April)	Marvel	Dan Abnett, Andy Lanning	Annihilation: Conquest #6
Achilles Warkiller	2009	DC	Gail Simone, Aaron Lopresti	Wonder Woman (vol. 3) #30
Haunt	2009	Image	Robert Kirkman, Todd McFarlane	Haunt #1
King Chimera	2009	DC	Matthew Sturges, Fernando Pasarin	Justice Society of America (vol. 3) #24
Mot	2009		Nick Simmons	Incarnate #1
Drew McIntosh	2010	ZOOLOOK	Nicholas Da Silva	Dread & Alive #1

=== Manga/Anime ===
Character / Team / Series	Year Debuted	Creator/s	First Appearance
Saitama	2009	One	One-Punch Man

=== Film ===
Character / Team / Series	Year Debuted	Creator/s	First Appearance
David Dunn	2000	M. Night Shyamalan	Unbreakable (film)
The Incredibles, Frozone	2004	Brad Bird	The Incredibles
Catwoman (Patience Phillips)	2004		Catwoman
Sky High students and graduates	2005	Paul Hernandez, Robert Schooley, Mark McCorkle	Sky High
Krrish	2006	Rakesh Roshan	Krrish
Zenith Team (Captain Zoom, Concussion, Mega-Boy, Wonder, Houdini, Princess, Marsha Holloway)	2006	Adam Rifkin	Zoom
Dragonfly	2008	Craig Mazin	Superhero Movie
John Hancock	2008	Vincent Ngo	Hancock

=== Television ===
Character / Team / Series	Year Debuted	Creator/s	First Appearance
Ultraman Neos, Ultraseven 21	2000	Tsuburaya Productions	Ultraman Neos
Danny Phantom	2004	Butch Hartman	Danny Phantom
Ultraman Nexus	2004	Tsuburaya Productions	Ultraman Nexus
Ben Tennyson	2005	Man of Action (Duncan Rouleau, Joe Casey, Joe Kelly, and Steven T. Seagle)	Ben 10 (2005)
Garo	2005	Keita Amemiya	Garo
Ultraman Max, Ultraman Xenon	2005	Tsuburaya Productions	Ultraman Max
Heroes	2006	Tim Kring	Heroes
WordGirl	2006	Dorothea Gillim	WordGirl
Ultraman Mebius, Ultraman Hikari	2006	Tsuburaya Productions	Ultraman Mebius
Ultraseven X	2007	Tsuburaya Productions	Ultraseven X
Reimon (Rei)	2007	Tsuburaya Productions	Ultra Galaxy Mega Monster Battle
Metal Kaiser	2007	Tsuburaya Productions	Metal Kaiser
Kamen Rider Dragon Knight	2009	Steve Wang	Kamen Rider: Dragon Knight

== 2010s ==
=== Comic book ===
Character / Team	Year Debuted	Company	Creator/s	First Appearance
Biały Orzeł (White Eagle)	2011	Wizuale (Poland)	Maciej Kmiołek & Adam Kmiołek	Biały Orzeł #1
Spider-Man (Miles Morales)	2011 (August)	Marvel	Brian Michael Bendis & Sara Pichelli	Ultimate Fallout #4
America Chavez	2011 (September)	Marvel	Joe Casey & Nick Dragotta	Vengeance #1
Nova (Sam Alexander)	2011 (November)	Marvel	Jeph Loeb, Ed McGuinness	Marvel Point One #1
White Tiger (Ava Ayala)	2011 (December)	Marvel	Christos Gage, Tom Raney	Avengers Academy #20
Soundman	2012	BON COMICS	Brian Bondurant	"Power Couple!" (part of Kumate Works anthology)
Captain China	2012	Excel Comics [China]	Chi Wang & Jim Lai	Captain China #1
Gum Girl (Gabby Gomez)	2013	Disney/Hyperion	Rhode Montijo	The Gumazing Gum Girl! Book 1: Chews Your Destiny
Brainstormer (Natalie Gooch)	2013	Disney/Hyperion	Rhode Montijo	The Gumazing Gum Girl! Book 1: Chews Your Destiny
Bubble Boy (Rico Gomez)	2013	Disney/Hyperion	Rhode Montijo	The Gumazing Gum Girl! Book 1: Chews Your Destiny
Robo-Chef	2013	Disney/Hyperion	Rhode Montijo	The Gumazing Gum Girl! Book 1: Chews Your Destiny
Emiko Queen	2013 (March)	DC	Jeff Lemire, Andrea Sorrentino	Green Arrow Vol. 5 #18
Kamala Khan (a.k.a. Ms. Marvel)	2014	Marvel	Sana Amanat, G. Willow Wilson	Captain Marvel #14
Spider-Gwen	2014	Marvel	Jason Latour and Robbi Rodriguez	Edge of Spider-Verse #2
Gwenpool	2016	Marvel	Chris Bachalo	Howard the Duck Vol 6 #1
Ironheart (Riri Williams)	2016	Marvel	Brian Michael Bendis	Invincible Iron Man Vol. 3 #7
Ninja-Rina	2017	Disney/Hyperion	Rhode Montijo	The Gumazing Gum Girl! Book 2: Gum Luck
Ninja Spawn	2019	Image	Todd Mcfarlane	Spawn #297
Sol Azteca (Raul Gomez)	2019	Disney/Hyperion	Rhode Montijo	The Gumazing Gum Girl! Book 4: Cover Blown
Naomi McDuffie	2019 (March)	DC	Brian Michael Bendis, David F. Walker, Jamal Campbell	Naomi #1
The Jaguares (Miguel, Alma, Lucas, and Litza)	2019	Disney/Hyperion	Rhode Montijo	The Gumazing Gum Girl! Book 4: Cover Blown

=== Manga/Anime ===
Character / Team	Year Debuted	Company	Creator/s	First Appearance
Toshinori Yagi (All Might), Deku, Dynamite, Uravity, Ingenium, Shōto, Creati, Froppy, Red Riot, Pinky	2014	Shueisha	Kōhei Horikoshi	My Hero Academia
Saitama (Caped Baldy), Genos (Demon Cyborg), Tornado of terror, Bang (Silver fang), Kamikaze (Atomic Samurai), Isamu (Child Emperor), Bofoi (Metal Knight), King, Zombieman, Drive Knight, Pig God, Superalloy Darkshine, Watchdog Man, Flashy Flash, Tanktop Master, Bad (Metal Bat), Puri puri Prisoner	2015	Madhouse	ONE	One Punch Man

=== FIlm ===
Character / Team	Year Debuted	Company	Creator/s	First Appearance
Cutthroat, Charge, Shadow, The Wall	2011		Jason Trost	Vs
Andrew Detmer, Matt Garetty, Steve Montgomery	2012		Max Landis	Chronicle

=== Television ===
Character / Team	Year Debuted	Company	Creator/s	First Appearance
Chuck Adoodledoo	2015 (August)	Animasia Studio	Edmund Chan and Raye Lee	Chuck Chicken
Powell family	2010	Ra. One	Greg Berlanti, Jon Harmon Feldman	No Ordinary Family
The Cape	2011	NBC	Tom Wheeler	The Cape
The Thundermans	2013	Nickelodeon	Jed Spingarn	The Thundermans
Leo Dooley	2012 (February)	Disney	Chris Pratt	Lab Rats (American TV series)
Donald Davenport	2012 (February)	Disney	Chris Pratt	Lab Rats (American TV series)
Adam Davenport	2012 (February)	Disney	Chris Pratt	Lab Rats (American TV series)
Bree Davenport	2012 (February)	Disney	Chris Pratt	Lab Rats (American TV series)
Chase Davenport	2013 (February)	Disney	Chris Pratt	Lab Rats (American TV series)
Skyler Storm	2013 (October)	Disney	Jim Bernstein, Andy Schwartz	Mighty Med
Oliver	2013 (October)	Disney	Jim Bernstein, Andy Schwartz	Mighty Med
Kaz	2013 (October)	Disney	Jim Bernstein, Andy Schwartz	Mighty Med
Blue Tornado	2013 (October)	Disney	Jim Bernstein, Andy Schwartz	Mighty Med
Tecton	2013 (October)	Disney	Jim Bernstein, Andy Schwartz	Mighty Med
The Thundermans	2013	Nickelodeon	Jed Spingarn	The Thundermans
Kid Danger	2014	Nickelodeon	Dan Schneider, Dana Olsen	Henry Danger
Captain Man	2014	Nickelodeon	Dan Schneider, Dana Olsen	Henry Danger
William Clayton (Arrow) (Overwatch)	2015	DC	Andrew Kreisberg, Marc Guggenheim,	Arrow (TV series)
Sentinel (Alex Danvers)	2015 (November)	DC	Greg Berlanti, Ali Adler, Andrew Kreisberg	Supergirl (TV series)
Ladybug (Marinette Dupain-Cheng)	2015	Miraculous Corp.	Thomas Astruc	Miraculous: Tales of Ladybug & Cat Noir
Cat Noir (Adrien Agreste)	2015	Miraculous Corp.	Thomas Astruc	Miraculous: Tales of Ladybug & Cat Noir
Catboy	2015	Hasbro Entertainment		PJ Masks
Owlette	2015	Hasbro Entertainment		PJ Masks
Gekko	2015	Hasbro Entertainment		PJ Masks
Ava Sharpe	2018 (October)	DC	Greg Berlanti, Marc Guggenheim, Andrew Kreisberg, Phil Klemmer	Legends of Tomorrow
Dreamer	2018 (October)	DC	Robert Rovner, Jessica Queller	Supergirl (TV series)
Green Arrow (Mia Smoak)	2018 (October)	DC	Beth Schwartz	Arrow (TV series)
Behrad Tarazi	2018	DC	Greg Berlanti, Marc Guggenheim, Andrew Kreisberg, Phil Klemmer	Legends of Tomorrow

== 2020s ==
=== Comic book ===
Character / Team	Year Debuted	Company	Creator/s	First Appearance
Green Lantern (Sojourner Mullein)	2020 (January)	DC	N. K. Jemisin, Jamal Campbell	Far Sector #1
The Union (Britannia Project)	2020 (December)	Marvel	Paul Grist	The Union #1
Monolith	2020 (December)	Image Comics	Todd Mcfarlane	Spawn #313
Kid Quick / The Flash (Jess Chambers)	2021 (February)	DC	Ivan Cohen, Eleonora Carlini	DC's Very Merry Multiverse #1
Wonder Girl / Wonder Woman (Yara Flor)	2021 (March)	DC	Joëlle Jones	Dark Nights: Death Metal #7
Monkey Prince	2021 (May)	DC	Gene Luen Yang, Bernard Chang	DC Festival of Heroes: The Asian Superhero Celebration #1
Isom (Avery Silman)	2022 (August)	Rippaverse	Eric July	Isom #1
Scorched	2022	Image	Todd Mcfarlane	Scorched #1
Yaira	2022 (August)	Rippaverse	Eric July	Isom #1
The Alphacore	2022 (August)	Rippaverse	Eric July	Isom #1
City Boy (Cameron Kim)	2023 (January)	DC	Greg Pak, Minkyu Jung	Wildstorm 30th Anniversary Special #1
The Envoy (Xanthe Zhou)	2023 (March)	DC	Alyssa Wong, Haining	Lazarus Planet: Legends Reborn #1
The Vigil	2023 (April)	DC	Ram V, Lalit Kumar Sharma	Lazarus Planet: Next Evolution #1
Spider-Boy	2023 (April)	Marvel	Dan Slott, Humberto Ramos	Spider-Man (vol. 4) #7
Maystorm	2023 (November)	Marvel	Peach Momoko	Ultimate Universe #1

=== Film ===
Character / Team	Year Debuted	Company	Creator/s	First Appearance
Jaison Varghese / Minnal Murali (Tovino Thomas)	2021 (December)	Netflix	Basil Joseph	Minnal Murali

=== Television ===
Character / Team	Year Debuted	Company	Creator/s	First Appearance
Batwoman (Ryan Wilder)	2021 (January)	DC	Caroline Dries, Holly Dale	Batwoman (TV series)

== See also ==
- List of years in comics
- List of comic book supervillain debuts
