= Supermind =

Supermind may refer to:

- Supermind AI, a Chinese government-sponsored artificial intelligence platform
- Supermind (Integral yoga) in philosophy of Sri Aurobindo
- "Professor Supermind and Son", a comics feature from the 1940s
- Supermind (novel), a science fiction novel by A. E. van Vogt from 1979
