= Godman =

Godman or God-man may refer to:

- Godman (name)
- Godman (India), a colloquial term used in India for a charismatic cult-like leader
- The Godman, a 1999 Indian Malayalam film
- God-Man, a recurring character in the comic Tom the Dancing Bug
- Qodman, Azerbaijan - also spelled Godman
- GodMen, a men's ministry founded by Conservative Christian comedian Brad Stine
- God-man (Christianity) (lat. Deus homo), the concept of divine incarnation of Jesus Christ in Christian mysticism
  - Hypostatic union, in Christian theology the union of Christ's humanity and divinity

== See also ==
- Ike! Godman, a Japanese tokusatsu show from 1972
- Man of God (disambiguation)
