= Black Fox =

Black Fox may refer to:

== Animals ==
- Black fox, an alternative name for Silver fox (animal), a melanistic form of the red fox

== People ==
- Black Fox (Cherokee chief), a chief of the Cherokee from 1801 to 1811

== Film and television ==
- Black Fox (miniseries), a 1995 miniseries, with Tony Todd and Christopher Reeve
- Blackfox (2019 film), a Japanese anime film
- Black Fox: The Rise and Fall of Adolf Hitler, a 1962 documentary film
- The Black Fox, a character in The Court Jester, played by Edward Ashley

== Books ==
- The Black Fox, a 1950 novel by H. F. Heard
- Black Fox of Lorne, a 1956 children's historical novel by Marguerite de Angeli
- Black Fox, a 1973 novel by Matt Braun
- Black Foxes, a 1995-2014 duology of novels by Dennis L. McKiernan
- Black Foxes, a 1996 novel by Sonya Hartnett

== Comics ==
- Black Fox (Raul Chalmers), a supervillain character in Marvel Comics
- Black Fox (Robert Paine), a superhero character in Marvel Comics

== Locations ==
- Black Fox Nuclear Power Plant, a nuclear power plant proposed by the Public Service Company of Oklahoma in 1973
