= Man of God (disambiguation) =

Man of God is a title given to prophets and religious leaders in the Judeo-Christian tradition.

Man of God may also refer to:

- Man of God (2021 film), a Greek film
- Man of God (2022 film), a Nigerian film
- "Man of God", a song by Audio Adrenaline from the 1995 album Bloom
- Ekvtime: Man of God, a 2018 Georgian film

== See also ==
- Woman of God, a 2016 novel by James Patterson and Maxine Paetro
- "Allah Ke Bande", a song by Kailash Kher from the 2003 Indian film Waisa Bhi Hota Hai Part II
- Allah Ke Banday, a 2010 Indian Hindi-language film
- Godman (disambiguation)
