= Qodman =

- Municipality
- Location within Azerbaijan
- Coordinates: 38°58′35″N 48°37′37″E
- Country: Azerbaijan
- Rayon: Masally

Population
  - Total: 1,066
- Time zone: UTC+4 (AZT)
  - Summer (DST): UTC+5 (AZT)

Qodman (also, Godman, Kodman, and Kodoman) is a village and municipality in the Masally Rayon of Azerbaijan. It has a population of 1,066.
