= Twister (comics) =

The Twister

Publication information
- Publisher: Novelty Press
- First appearance: Blue Bolt Comics (vol. 2) #1 (June 1941)
- Created by: Paul Gustavson

In-story information
- Alter ego: Bob Sanders
- Abilities: Can control whirlwinds and use them to fly, and is super-strong. Carries a Cyclone Gun that shoots powerful blasts of air.

The Twister is a comic book superhero who first appeared in Blue Bolt Comics from Novelty Press.

== Publication history ==
Created by Paul Gustavson, The Twister appeared in short stories in issues #1 to #7 of Blue Bolt Comics, volume two (June–December 1941). After that, he wasn't seen again for decades.

In 2009, he appeared in the Dynamite Entertainment miniseries Black Terror, which is part of the Project Superpowers line of comics; he then appeared in Project Superpowers: Chapter Two as an ally of the heroes.

== Fictional biography ==
=== Novelty Press ===
Bob Sanders is a direct descendant of Odysseus, and thus inherited the curse of the wind god Aeolus to retrieve the "bad winds" Odysseus had accidentally released. When Bob was 14, a cyclone descended on his home town of Windy Gap and killed his parents, but Bob himself was lifted into the sky and brought back to earth unharmed. He wasn't unchanged, however; he now had the power to harness the wind and generate and control whirlwinds, and he had super-strength. Donning a costume and calling himself The Twister, he used his new abilities to combat evil. He also armed himself with a "Cyclone Gun," which shot powerful blasts of air.

=== Dynamite Entertainment ===
At some point after World War II, The Twister was captured and imprisoned in the mystical Urn of Pandora, along with scores of other heroes, by the misguided Fighting Yank. Decades later, the Urn was broken and the heroes freed; Twister emerged with a new costume, whose constantly shifting appearance makes him look like a man-shaped tornado, but his powers seem to be unchanged. What part he will play in the modern world remains to be seen.
