= Supermind AI =

Chinese artificial intelligence platform

Supermind is a state-funded Chinese artificial intelligence platform that tracks scientists and researchers internationally.

The platform is the flagship project of Shenzhen's International Science and Technology Information Center. It mines data from science and technology databases such as Springer, Wiley, Clarivate and Elsevier. It is intended to detect technological breakthroughs and to identify possible sources of talent as part of China's efforts to advance technologically.

The platform also uses government data security and security intelligence organizations such as Peng Cheng Laboratory, the China National GeneBank, BGI Group and the Key Laboratory of New Technologies of Security Intelligence.

According to Hong Kong-based Asia Times, the platform, "While not an overt espionage tool...may be used to identify key personnel who could be bribed, deceived or manipulated into divulging classified information".

The Organisation for Economic Co-operation and Development (OECD) flagged the project as an incident, meaning it may be of interest to policymakers and other stakeholders.

US technology group American Edge Project criticized the project as a global risk of China's security services using the platform to place agents in jobs with access to important information, recruit technical personnel, and identify targets for hacking operations.
