= Rainbowman =

Rainbowman or Rainbow man may refer to:

== Music ==
=== People ===
- Rainbowman, a member of the Hype band, played by David Bowie

=== Albums ===
- Rainbow Man, an album by Jeff Bates, 2003
- Rainbow-Man, an album by Mitsuhiro Oikawa, 2008

=== Songs ===
- "Rainbow man ", a single by The Fool (design collective), 1969
- "Rainbow Man", a song by Michael Martin Murphey from Geronimo's Cadillac (album), 1972
- "Rainbow Man", a song by The Settlers (band) from The New Sound of the Settlers, 1974
- "Rainbow Man", a song by SBB (band) from Welcome, 1979
- "Rainbow Man", a song by Earl Klugh from Soda Fountain Shuffle, 1985
- "Rainbow Man", a song by the Pogues from Hell's Ditch, 1990
- "Rainbow Man", a song by Rik Emmett from Ipso Facto (album), 1992
- "Rainbow Man", a song by the Yellow Monkey from Sicks, 1997
- "Rainbowman", a song by Beseech from ...From a Bleeding Heart, 1998
- "Rainbow Man", a single by Busy P, 2007

== Films ==
- The Rainbow Man, directed by Fred C. Newmeyer, 1929
- The Rainbow Man, also known as Nijiotoko, directed by Kiyohiko Ushihara, 1949

== Characters ==
- Warrior of Love Rainbowman, 1972–73 television series
- Rainbow Man, an enemy of Greg Saunders

== Other uses ==
- Rollen Stewart, also known as "Rainbow Man"
