= Ultraman Nice =

- Genre: Tokusatsu; Kaiju; Superhero; Science fiction Kyodai Hero
- Created by: Tsuburaya Productions
- Directed by: Keita Ito
- Starring: Hiroshi Miyazaka; Susumu Kurobe; Hiroko Sakurai; Asako Yashiro; Minako Ishida; Keisuke Tsumoto; Masahiro Tsuburaya; Keita Ito; Hiroyuki Okano; Toshio Miyake
- Opening theme: Ultraman Nice by Project DMM
- Country of origin: Japan
- Original language: Japanese
- No. of episodes: 20

Production
- Producer: Masahiro Tsuburaya
- Running time: Approx. 1 mins per episode

Original release
- Network: Chubu-Nippon Broadcasting Co., Ltd.
- Release: October 20, 1999 – September 28, 2000

Related
- Ultra Series

Ultraman Nice (ウルトラマンナイス, Urutoraman Naisu) is a spin-off of the Ultra Series. Produced by Tsuburaya Productions and Bandai, Ultraman Nice was released in a series of commercials on October 20, 1999, with a total of 20 episodes.

== Plot ==
Ultraman Nice arrives from the planet TOY-1 in a series of infomercials (1-minute toy commercials) presented during the 1999 Japanese reruns of Ultraman Tiga. The 1-minute spots, advertising the wide variety of Bandai Ultraman toys and other merchandise, actually do have a storyline, along with some surprise guests.

Throughout the series, Alien Zagon and his monsters attacked Earth for the Bandai figures. However, at each attack, Ultraman Nice managed to defeat them and, at the end of the series, the aliens were finally vanquished.

== Characters ==
=== GOKAZOKU Officers ===
The GOKAZOKU Officers (GOKAZOKU隊, Gokazoku Tai) is an attack team consist of the six members of Yumeboshi family. Each family members piloted their own Hexa Jets (ヘキサジェット, Hekisa Jetto) in against Alien Zagon and his monsters.

- Ginga Yumeboshi (夢星 銀河, Yumeboshi Ginga): The patriarch of the Yumeboshi family through mukoyōshi, aged 35 years old and worked as a teacher in nursery school. His true identity is Ultraman Nice, a warrior from 1st Planet TOY (TOY一番星, Toi Ichiban Hoshi) of Nebula M78 and transforms through the Nice Dreamer (ナイスドリーマー, Naisu Dorīmā) watch by eating the Secret Choco (シークレット・チョコ, Shīkuretto Choko) chocolate balls contained within. His double life is a secret to everyone except the elders of Yumeboshi family.
  - Ultraman Nice's true age is 10,390 years old. He is distinctively known for a large "N" letter on his back and the Color Timer situated on his left chest. Nice fights with the ideals of Ultraman Tiga and his finishing move is Very Nice Ray (ベリーナイス光線, Berī Naisu Kōsen). All of his statistics revolves around the number 39, which is a nod to the goroawase for "thank you", spoken in Japanese transliteration.
- Kataru Yumeboshi (夢星 語, Yumeboshi Kataru) and Kiku Yumeboshi (夢星 キク, Kiku Yumeboshi): Akimi's parents and the Yumeboshi family's elders, aged 60 and 54 years old respectively.
- Akimi Yumeboshi (夢星 アキミ, Yumeboshi Akimi): Ginga's 33 years old wife and the matriarch of Yumeboshi family.
- Cosmo Yumeboshi (夢星 コスモ, Yumeboshi Kosumo) and Mirai Yumeboshi (夢星 未来, Yumeboshi Mirai): The children of the Yumeboshi family, aged 10 and 7 respectively. Cosmo is the older sister of the pair, while Mirai is the younger brother who's a fan of the Ultra Series.

=== Zagon Galaxy creatures ===
The creatures of the Zagon Galaxy (ザゴン星系, Zagon Seikei) are the antagonists of the series. They are led by Alien Zagon and usually fights against the GOKAZOKU members and Ultraman Nice. Their aliases are written in Hiragana in the 2001 magazine.

- Deadly Poison Alien Alien Zagon (猛毒宇宙人 ザゴン星人, Mōdoku Uchūjin Zagon Seijin): A heinous alien from third planet Zagon Star bent on conquering Earth and frequently fights Ultraman Nice. As his alias suggest, Zagon has the ability to secrete poison gas from his ears but was never shown in the series proper.
- Gluttonous Monster Momo-Zagon (食いしん坊怪獣 モモザゴン, Kuishinbō Kaijū Momo Zagon): A pinkish traffic sign/traffic light themed monster from the eighth Planet Momo-Za Star (モモザ星, Momoza Sei) with the ability to unleash sound waves.
- Rampaging Monster Buruburu-Zagon (暴れん坊怪獣 ブルブルザゴン, Abarenbō Kaijū Buruburu Zagon): A spiral-themed monster from the twelfth Planet Buru-Za Star (ブルザ星, Buruza Sei). It is capable of spitting fireballs.
- Angry Monster Tabu-Zagon (怒りん坊怪獣 タブザゴン, Okorinbō Kaijū Tabu Zagon): A porcine monster from the fifth planet Tabu-Za Star (タブザ星, Tabuza Sei). It has giant ears capable of assuming as Tabu-Zagon's alternate face with reflective properties but its weak point is its snout. Tabu-Zagon is a late addition to the other monsters, as it appeared during the winter 2000 arc of the infomercial, hence he was absent from a tag team between the Zagon Galaxy creatures.

== Design ==
Ultraman Nice and the Zagon Galaxy creatures are all designed by Hiroshi Maruyama. Nice's mask used the same mold as Ultraman Tiga, but his crest is colored red and has a pair of blue-colored side lines. Alien Zagon on the other hand was based on a monster in Ultraman Tiga while adding more colors to the image.

== Cast ==
- Ginga Yumeboshi: Hiroshi Miyasaka (宮坂 ひろし, Miyasaka Hiroshi)
- Kataru Yumeboshi: Susumu Kurobe (黒部 進, Kurobe Susumu)
- Kiku Yumeboshi: Hiroko Sakurai (桜井 浩子, Sakurai Hiroko)
- Akimi Yumeboshi: Asako Yashiro (矢代 朝子, Yashiro Asako)
- Cosmo Yumeboshi: Hinako Ishida (石田 比奈子, Ishida Hinako)
- Mirai Yumeboshi: Keisuke Tsumoto (津本 恵輔, Tsumoto Keisuke)
- Narrator: Keita Itō (伊藤 啓太, Itō Keita)
- Alien Zagon (voice): Masahiro Tsuburaya (円谷 昌弘, Tsuburaya Masahiro)
- Ultraman Nice (suit actor): Hiroyuki Okano (岡野 弘之, Okano Hiroyuki)
- Monster suit actor: Toshio Miyake (三宅 敏夫, Miyake Toshio)

== Episodes ==
- You're Not Calling!!
- The Secret of Ultraman Nice...
- From the Mouth Comes Evil...
- I Want an Airplane...
- I Made a Mistake!
- Discharge the Very Nice Ray!!
- Ultraman Nice is Also Cool!
- Spring Outfits are Here!!
- Let's Go to the Picnic!!
- Be Careful Not to Get Too Hooked...
- He's Here!! Tabu Zagon
- Mirai, Lost
- Having Overslept...
- In Exchange for That...
- Don't Get in my Way!!
- Captured Mirai
- New Monster is Here
- Mirai's Dream Come True
- Papa, Exhausted
- Nice is the Best!!

== Theme song ==
"Ultraman Nice"

- Lyric: Reo Rinozuka (裡及塚 玲央, Rinozuka Reo)
- Composer: Yasuo Kosugi (小杉 保夫, Kosugi Yasuo)
- Arrangement: MANTA
- Singer: Project DMM
