= Godman (name) =

Godman is a both a surname and a given name. Notable people with the name include:

== Surname ==
- Alice Godman (1868–1944), British charity worker
- Buda Godman (1888–1945), American criminal
- David Godman (born 1953), author of books on Ramana Maharshi's teachings and disciples
- Frederick DuCane Godman (1834–1919), English naturalist
- John Davidson Godman (1794–1830), American physician and naturalist
- Janet Godman (born 1966), English cricketer
- Lloyd Godman (1952–2023), New Zealand photographer and ecological artist
- Norman Godman (1937–2018), Scottish politician
- Phil Godman (born 1982), Scottish rugby union player
- Trish Godman (1939–2019), Scottish politician

== Given name ==
- Godman Irvine

== See also ==
- Ivars Godmanis
