= Cyber Cross =

1989 video game

- Developer: ITL Co.
- Publisher: Face Corporation
- Platform: PC Engine
- Release: 1989
- Genre: Beat 'em up
- Mode: Single-player

Cyber Cross: Busou Keiji (Note: Japanese: 武装刑事サイバークロス, Hepburn: Busō Keiji Saibā Kurosu) is a beat 'em up video game released for the PC Engine in 1989, developed by Face Corporation. It has a sequel called Cross Wiber.

== Reception ==
Reception

Review scores
Publication	Score
Computer and Video Games	80%
Famitsu	5/10, 6/10, 7/10, 5/10
Gekkan PC Engine	75/100, 80/100, 68/100
Marukatsu PC Engine	6/10, 6/10, 7/10, 8/10

Cyber Cross garnered mixed reviews from critics.
