= Owl (Dell Comics) =

The Owl

Publication information
- Publisher: Dell Comics
- First appearance: Crackajack Funnies #25 (July 1940)
- Created by: Frank Thomas

In-story information
- Alter ego: Nick Terry
- Partnerships: Belle Wayne; Laura Holt
- Abilities: (Originally); Excellent hand to hand combatant Gliding via cape Black light projection via gun Use of various gimmicks and devices (Currently); Flight; Ability to project a field of "black light"

The Owl is a superhero that first appeared in Dell Comics' Crackajack Funnies #25 (July 1940), continuing until #43 (Jan 1942).

== Fictional biography ==
Police detective Nick Terry becomes the Owl to protect his home city of Yorktown from criminals. Not having superpowers, he relies on his fighting skills and a number of gimmicks, such as his flying "Owlmobile," a cape that functions as a hang glider, and a hand-held "black light" gun that casts a beam of darkness. His fiancée and newspaper reporter, Belle Wayne, knows his secret identity and becomes his sidekick, Owl Girl.

According to Jess Nevins' Encyclopedia of Golden Age Superheroes, the Owl's enemies include "the insane Ma Madespo and her four insane killer sons, the crime-mongering Dr. Nodd, the vicious crimelord Pantherman, the hooded and maimed German veteran the Spectre, and German scoundrels during World War One."

After World War II, the Owl (along with dozens of other heroes) is trapped in the Urn of Pandora by the misguided Fighting Yank. Decades later, the Urn is shattered, freeing the heroes, many of them transformed by the experience. The Owl now has the power of flight and the power to emanate a field of black light from his body. He returns to Yorktown and finds that it is now being watched over by the granddaughter of Belle Wayne.

== History ==
The Owl first appeared in Crackajack Funnies #25 (July 1940). After Crackajack ended, the character moved over to Dell’s Popular Comics from issue #72 (February 1942) to #85 (March 1943). Belle made frequent appearances in both titles.

In the 1960s, inspired by the success of the Batman TV series, Gold Key Comics revived the Owl with "Owl Girl" as a sidekick, though now named Laura Holt (with no mention of Belle Wayne having ever existed). Owl Girl handled most of the physical combat. The two issues of Gold Key’s The Owl—in which the duo were shown in campy, self-parodying stories—came out in April 1967 and 1968, respectively.

In the 1970s, the Owl (now working solo) appeared in issue #22 of Gold Key’s The Occult Files of Dr. Spektor. A text story in that same issue told of Doctor Spektor speculating that the Owl may have been privy to some kind of prolonged youth, a secret that could not be shared with Owl Girl.

In 1999, character appeared in issue #17 of AC's Men of Mystery Comics. and is one of many public domain characters to appear in Dynamite Entertainment’s 2008 miniseries, Project Superpowers with a four-issue mini-series starring both the Owl and another new Owl Girl (this version being the granddaughter of Belle Wayne).

== Powers and abilities ==
Originally, the Owl had no superpowers but he was an excellent hand to hand combatant. He wore a cape which allowed him to glide, used a gun that could project "black light" and possessed a flying car called the Owlmobile. After being released from the Urn of Pandora, the Owl now has the power of flight and the ability to project a field of "black light".
