= Black Fox (Robert Paine) =

Publication information
- Publisher: Marvel Comics
- First appearance: Marvel: The Lost Generation #12 (March 2000)
- Created by: Roger Stern and John Byrne

In-story information
- Alter ego: Robert William Paine
- Team affiliations: First Line
- Abilities: Hand-to-hand combatant, athlete, and experienced spy.

Black Fox (Robert William Paine) is a fictional superhero appearing in American comic books published by Marvel Comics.

== Publication history ==
The character's primary appearances have been in Marvel Comics' limited series, Marvel: The Lost Generation, debuting in issue #12 (March 2000).

== Fictional character biography ==
Dr. Robert William Paine was born in the fictional city of Foxwood Farms, Illinois presumably in the early decades of the twentieth century. During World War II, Paine worked as an American intelligence agent and was assigned to infiltrate Nazi Germany. After the war, he took to living the life of a swashbuckler.

It was during this time that Paine was driven to create his Black Fox identity. After a conflict with the vampiric villain Nocturne, in which Paine's lover Miriam was killed, Paine declares, "Before, I was just a masked swashbuckler. After that...that was the day the Black Fox was truly born".

After many years of fighting crime, Paine retired to teach history and law at Northwestern University in Chicago. He later came out of retirement to help the superhero team First Line repel a Skrull invasion of Earth. During the final battle against the Skrulls, most of the First Line team, including Black Fox, were killed.

== Abilities ==
Black Fox is adept at hand-to-hand combat, an athlete, and experienced spy.

== Other versions ==
An alternate universe version of Black Fox appears in the storyline "Secret Wars". This version is a zombie from the Battleworld domain of the Deadlands.
