= Rikki Barnes =

Fictional comic character

- Cover art to Nomad: Girl Without a World #1. Art by Rafael Albuquerque.

Publication information
- Publisher: Marvel Comics
- First appearance: Heroes Reborn #½ (September 1996)
- Created by: Jeph Loeb; Rob Liefeld

In-story information
- Full name: Rebecca Barnes
- Species: Human
- Place of origin: Counter-Earth
- Team affiliations: Young Allies (Counter-Earth); Young Allies (Heroic Age)
- Partnerships: Captain America
- Notable aliases: Bucky; Nomad; Rikki Baines; Becky Barnes
- Abilities: Inter-reality reincarnation; Master martial artist, gymnast and hand-to-hand combatant

Rebecca "Rikki" Barnes is a fictional character appearing in American comic books published by Marvel Comics. Created by writer Jeph Loeb and artist Rob Liefeld, the character first appeared in Heroes Reborn #½ (September 1996), where she was established as the Counter-Earth granddaughter of Bucky Barnes during the 1996 "Heroes Reborn" storyline. Rikki crossed over to Earth-616 in the 2008 Onslaught Reborn miniseries, in which she operated as Nomad for a time, later joining the Exiles in another reality after being repeatedly reincarnated in her grandfather's place, and then the Future Foundation in the mainstream Marvel universe.

== Fictional character biography ==
=== Heroes Reborn ===
Rikki Barnes was first introduced in the Heroes Reborn series of books. She is native to an alternate world created by Franklin Richards in order to save his family, the Fantastic Four, and the rest of the heroes who 'died' fighting Onslaught. Rikki is the granddaughter of her world's version of Bucky Barnes.

Her brother John was involved with a radical group led by the Red Skull and through that contact she met Captain America, eventually becoming his protégé. Rikki's world is eventually brought into the main universe, becoming Counter-Earth. However, the transferral process causes half of the world to be submerged underwater. Rikki eventually formed a group of like minded individuals to bring order, called the Young Allies.

=== Onslaught Reborn ===
Franklin Richards becomes the target of Onslaught following his resurrection. Franklin, eventually encounters Rikki, who summons the Avengers to battle Onslaught. The fight against Onslaught leads to the Baxter Building, where Rikki sacrifices herself to push Onslaught into the Negative Zone. Instead of dying, Rikki is transported to the main universe, Earth-616.

=== Nomad ===
After learning that Captain America (Steve Rogers) had died, Rikki feels lost again and clings to the only things she has: her heroism and her brother. After returning to her apartment, Rikki finds a brand new Nomad costume and a note that it was for her. Rikki later seeks out the John Barnes of Earth-616 and falsifies an ID to stay close to him. She learns that her Earth-616 counterpart died shortly after being born. Shortly afterward, Rikki puts on the costume and assumes the mantle of Nomad to battle Flag-Smasher, who is attacking a military recruitment facility.

Rikki makes further appearances as Nomad in the limited series Nomad: Girl Without A World, by Sean McKeever and David Baldeon. In the series, Rikki meets Anya Corazon, which paved the way for McKeever and Baldeon to use these characters as the core of a new team and series Young Allies.

During the team's first mission, Rikki and Araña are captured by a team of teenaged supervillains who call themselves the Bastards of Evil, as they are all supposedly illegitimate children of supervillains. In order to establish themselves as a viable threat, the Bastards capture Rikki and Araña and intend to execute them in front of a massive audience. While Araña distracts the villains, Rikki breaks the bonds from her wrists and enables the girls' escape. When the rest of the Allies arrive, they promptly defeat the Bastards.

=== Onslaught Unleashed ===
Some time later, Rikki begins having nightmares set in the jungles of South America, which foretell her teammate Toro being kidnapped. Later, while investigating Roxxon's illegal weapons systems, the Secret Avengers come across plans for Project Power, a new and incredibly deadly power source developed in the Colombian rainforest. As the Secret Avengers investigate the facility, Beast and Ant-Man find the source of the mysterious energy source to be from the Negative Zone. As Rikki races inside the facility to locate Toro, she stumbles into the control room instead, where she encounter Onslaught.

Possessing Rikki's body, Onslaught reveals that she is a construct created to act as his host, with the real Rikki having died in the Negative Zone. Rikki has Gravity kill her to prevent Onslaught from returning.

=== Reincarnated in the Multiverse ===
After her death, Rikki is reincarnated in several alternate universes, where she becomes the sidekick of each universe's Captain America. In one universe, Rikki becomes the sidekick of Peggy Carter, who took Steve Rogers' place in the Super Soldier Program following his death. Rikki and Carter are killed by an atomic bomb triggered by the Red Skull, only to be reincarnated in another universe. There, they join the Exiles in fighting the Tribunal, a band of rogue Watchers. During this time, Rikki establishes a relationship with Valkyrie. Rikki is later reincarnated into another reality where she is in a relationship with Toni Ho until they are killed by The Maker.

=== Future Foundation ===
Rikki is next seen in space as a prisoner on the planet L'ar Gath Five on Earth-616. She is sprung from captivity by the Future Foundation while they are seeking to reassemble the scattered remains of Molecule Man. Rikki meets Foundation member Julie Power, with the two developing a mutual attraction to each other.

== Other versions ==
In Exiles Vol. 3, after romancing Rikki's "Becky Barnes" reincarnation, Valkyrie encounters an alternate version of Becky who serves as a member of the pirate crew of Ben Grimm, both flirting with one another before Valkyrie is reunited with Rikki. While trapped in a vision by rogue Watchers, Rikki sees a reality where she is unhappily married to a man.

== Powers and abilities ==
Rikki is a natural athlete who was trained by S.H.I.E.L.D. and Captain America. She is a gifted fighter, marksman and acrobat with the familiarity with technological devices of a S.H.I.E.L.D. agent.

Due to the special circumstances of her creation, which was influenced by Franklin Richards' idolization of both Captain America and his own mother, Rikki is repeatedly reincarnated into another reality after death, with her full memory of her past lives as well as selected injuries and scars and her trademark equipment.

=== Weapons and equipment ===
As Bucky she wore a bulletproof costume modeled after the original Bucky. She also made use of a vibranium-photonic energy shield along with vibranium soled boots that allowed her to run up walls, move silently, leap greater distances and land from great heights. She also wielded a pistol.

As Nomad, she made use of much of the same equipment with a new costume based on the Nomad identity once worn by Steve Rogers. She retains the vibranium-photonic shield and now uses throwing discs used by previous Nomads. It is possible she still possesses the vibranium soled boots, though she no longer used the pistol in that new identity. With her subsequent rebirth, she has returned to using her old gear.

== Collected editions ==
Title	Material collected	Published date	ISBN
Nomad: Girl Without a World	Nomad: Girl Without a World #1-4, material from Captain America #600	April 2010	978-0785144199
