= List of Captain America titles =

Captain America is a superhero in the Marvel Universe. Since 1941, he has starred in several ongoing series, as well as many limited series and specials. All stories are published exclusively by Marvel Comics under their standard imprint, unless otherwise noted.

== Primary series ==
- Captain America Comics #1–73 (Timely Comics; March 1941 – July 1949)
- Captain America's Weird Tales #74–75 (Timely Comics; October 1949 – February 1950)
- Captain America #76–78 (Atlas Comics; May–September 1954)
- Tales of Suspense #58–99 (Marvel Comics, October 1964 – March 1968)
- Captain America #100–454 (April 1968 – August 1996)
  - Captain America Annual #1–13 (1971–1972; 1976–1977; 1981–1983; 1986; 1990–1994)
- Captain America vol. 2 #1–13 [#455–467] (November 1996 – November 1997)
- Captain America vol. 3 #1–50 [#468–517] (January 1998 – February 2002)
  - Captain America/Citizen V Annual 1998
  - Iron Man/Captain America Annual 1998
  - Captain America Annual 1999 – 2001
- Captain America vol. 4 #1–32 [#518–549] (June 2002 – December 2004)
- Captain America vol. 5 #1–50 [#550–599] (January 2005 – July 2009)
- Captain America #600–619 (August 2009 – August 2011)
  - Captain America and Bucky #620–628 (September 2011 – May 2012)
  - Captain America and Hawkeye #629–632 (June–August 2012)
  - Captain America and Iron Man #633–635 (August–October 2012)
  - Captain America and Namor #635.1 (October 2012)
  - Captain America and Black Widow #636–640 (November 2012 – February 2013)
- Captain America vol. 6 #1–19 [#620–638] (September 2011 – December 2012)
- Captain America vol. 7 #1–25 [#639–663] (January 2013 – December 2014)
- All-New Captain America #1–6 [#664–669] (January 2015 – June 2015)
  - All-New Captain America Special #1 (July 2015)
- Captain America: Sam Wilson #1–24 [#670–693] (December 2015 – September 2017)
- Captain America vol. 8 #25 [#694] (October 2017)
- Captain America vol. 9 #695–704 (January 2018 – August 2018)
- Captain America vol. 10 #1–30 [#705–734] (September 2018 – September 2021)
- Captain America vol. 11 #0 [#735] (June 2022)
- Captain America: Symbol of Truth (Note: Featuring Sam Wilson.) #1–14 [#736–749] (July 2022 – August 2023)
- Captain America vol. 12 #750 (September 2023)
- Captain America vol. 13 #1–16 [#751–766] (November 2023 – February 2025)
- Sam Wilson: Captain America #1–#5 [#767–#771] (January 2025 – May 2025)
- Captain America vol. 14 #1– [#772– ] (July 2025 – Ongoing)

== Secondary spin-off series ==
- Nomad #1–4 (November 1990 - February 1991)
- Nomad vol. 2 #1–25 (May 1992 – May 1994)
- Captain America: Sentinel of Liberty #1–12 (September 1998 – August 1999)
- Captain America and the Falcon #1–14 (May 2004 – June 2005)
- Winter Soldier #1–19 (April 2012 – June 2013)
- Bucky Barnes: The Winter Soldier #1–11 (December 2014 – November 2015)
- Captain America: Steve Rogers #1–19 (July 2016 – September 2017)
- Captain America: Sentinel of Liberty vol. 2 (Note: Featuring Steve Rogers.) #1–13 (August 2022 – August 2023)
  - Captain America Finale #1 (October 2023)

== Limited series and one-shots ==
- Marvel Treasury Edition: Captain America's Bicentennial Battles (June 1976)
- Captain America and the Campbell Soup Kids (1980 - Promotional Issue)
- Captain America: Secret Story (November 1980) - Special Edition by Jack Kirby
- Falcon #1–4 (November 1983 – February 1984)
- Captain America: Special Edition Vol. 1 #1-2 (February - March 1984)
- Captain America Meets the Asthma Monster #1 (1985-Promotional Issue)
- Captain America: Trick or Treat (1987) - Shan Lon version (reduced book dimensions)
- Marvel Comics Presents: Captain America Vol.1 #1 "Cap for President" (1987)
- Captain America: Return of the Asthma Monster #2 (1989-Promotional Issue)
- Captain America Goes to War Against Drugs Vol.1 #1-2 (1990, 1994) - produced in cooperation with the FBI
- Adventures of Captain America #1–4 (September 1991 – January 1992)
- Captain America: The Movie (May 1992)
- U.S. Agent #1–4 (June – September 1993)
- Captain America: The Medusa Effect (1994)
- Captain America: The Drug Wars (1994)
- Captain America: - Collectors' Preview (March 1995) (One-Shot)
- Captain America/Nick Fury: Blood Truce Vol. 1 #1 (1995) (One-Shot - Team-Up)
- Captain America - The Legend Vol. 1 #1 (September 1996) (One-Shot Tribute issue)
- Marvels Comics: Captain America Vol.1 #1 (July 2000) (One-Shot)
- USAgent #1–3 (August – October 2001)
- Captain America: Dead Men Running #1–3 (February – May 2002)
- Captain America: Red, White & Blue (September 2002) (One-Shot)
- Truth: Red, White & Black #1–7 (January – July 2003)
- Captain America: What Price Glory? #1–4 (March 2003)
- Wolverine Captain America #1–4 (April 2004)
- Captain America - 65th Anniversary Special (May 2006)
- Winter Soldier: Winter Kills (February 2007) (One-Shot)
- Fallen Son: The Death of Captain America #1–5 (June – August 2007)
- Captain America: The Chosen #1–6 (November 2007 – March 2008)
- Mythos: Captain America (August 2008) (One-Shot)
- Captain America: White Vol. 1 #0-5 (Sept 2008 (#0) Nov 2015 - Feb 2016 (#1-5))
- Daredevil & Captain America: Dead on Arrival (November 2008) (One-Shot - Team-Up)
- Captain America Theater of War (December 2008 – February 2010)
- Captain America Comics 70th Anniversary Special #1 (June 2009) (One-Shot)
- Marvel Spotlight: Captain America #1 (June 2009) (One-Shot)
- Captain America: Reborn #1–6 (September 2009 – March 2010)
- Captain America: Who Will Wield the Shield? (February 2010) (One-Shot)
- Captain America: Who Won't Wield the Shield? (June 2010) (One-Shot)
- Siege: Captain America #1 (June 2010) (One-Shot)
- Captain America/Black Panther: Flags of Our Fathers (June – September 2010)
- Steve Rogers: Super-Soldier #1–4 (September – December 2010)
- Captain America The 1940s Newspaper Strip #1–3 (August 2010 – October 2010)
- Captain America: Forever Allies #1–4 (October 2010 – January 2011)
- Captain America: Patriot #1–4 (November 2010 – February 2011)
- Captain America: Man Out of Time #1–5 (January – May 2011)
- Captain America and the Korvac Saga #1–4 (February 2011 – May 2011)
- Captain America: First Vengeance Vol. 1 #1-8 (February 2011 - June 2011)
- Captain America: Hail Hydra #1–5 (March – July 2011)
- Ultimate Comics: Captain America #1–4 (March – June 2011)
- Captain America and the Falcon (May 2011) (One-Shot - Team-Up)
- Captain America and Crossbones (May 2011) (One-Shot - Team-Up)
- Captain America and Batroc (May 2011) (One-Shot - Team-Up)
- Captain America and the First Thirteen (May 2011) (One-Shot - Team-Up)
- Captain America and the Secret Avengers (May 2011) (One-Shot - Team-Up)
- Captain America: 70th Anniversary Magazine #1 (March 2011)
- Captain America Comics #1: 70th Anniversary Edition (May 2011)
- Captain America: Fighting Avenger (June 2011) (One-Shot)
- Captain America: First Vengeance Vol. 2 #1-4 (July - August 2011)
- Captain America Corps #1–5 (August – December 2011)
- Captain America: Rebirth (August 2011)
- Captain America: America's Avenger (August 2011) (One-Shot)
- Captain America: Living Legend Vol 1 #1-4 (October – December 2013)
- Winter Soldier: The Bitter March #1–5 (April – September 2014)
- Captain America and the Mighty Avengers #1–9 (January – August 2015)
- All-New Captain America: Fear Him Vol 1 #1-4 (April 2015)
- Captain America: Civil War Prelude Vol. 1 #1-4 (February - March 2016)
- Captain America: Road to War #1 (June 2016) (One-Shot - Team-Up)
- Generations: Sam Wilson and Steve Rogers #1 (November 2017)
- Falcon (vol. 2) #1–8 (December 2017 – July 2018)
- Winter Soldier (vol. 2) #1–5 (February – June 2019)
- Wolverine & Captain America: Weapon Plus (September 2019) (One-Shot - Team-Up)
- Falcon & Winter Soldier #1–5 (April 2020 – January 2021)
- Empyre: Captain America #1-3 (September - October 2020)
- U.S. Agent vol. 2 #1–5 (January – June 2021)
- King in Black: Captain America #1 (May 2021) (One-Shot)
- The United States of Captain America #1–5 (July – October 2021)
- Captain America/Iron Man Vol 1 #1-5 (February - May 2022)
- Captain America: Unforgiven #1 (June 2023) (One-Shot)
- Captain America: Cold War Alpha #1 (June 2023) (One-Shot)
- Captain America: Cold War Omega #1 (August 2023) (One-Shot)
- Captain America & Volstagg #1 (April 2025) (One-Shot - Team Up)
- Alien vs Captain America Vol 1 #1-4 (January - April 2026)

== Spotlight series ==
- All Winners #1–19, 21 (Summer 1941 – Winter 1946)
- All-Select Comics #1–10 (Fall 1943 – Summer 1946)
- USA #6–17 (December 1942 – Fall 1945)
- Marvel Mystery Comics #80–84, 86-92 (January 1947 – June 1949)
- Young Men #24-28 (December 1953 – June 1954)

== Writers ==
- Captain America Comics
  - Joe Simon #1–10
  - Jack Kirby #1–6
  - Stan Lee #3, 5–6, 8, 10–14, 16–18, 22
  - Unknown #15, 19–21, 23–73
- Captain America
  - Stan Lee #100–141, 216, 400, 600, Annual #1–2
  - Gary Friedrich #142–148
  - Gerry Conway #149–152
  - Steve Englehart #153–167, 169–186
  - John Warner #186–188
  - Tony Isabella #168, 189–191
  - Bill Mantlo #191, 256, 291
  - Marv Wolfman #192
  - Jack Kirby #193–214, Annual #3–4
  - Roy Thomas #168, 215–217, 423, Annual #9, 11, 13
  - Don Glut #217–221
  - Scott Edelman #220–221
  - David Kraft #221, 265–266, 271, 273–274
  - Steve Gerber #157, 221–223, 225
  - Peter Gillis #224, 238–239, 246, Annual #7
  - Roger McKenzie #226–237, 243–245, 250
  - Paul Kupperberg and Alan Kupperberg #240
  - Mike Barr #241, 257
  - Steve Grant #242
  - Roger Stern #230, 247–255
  - John Byrne #247, 249, 253–254
  - Jim Shooter #232, 250, 257, 259
  - Chris Claremont #257–258
  - David Michelinie #258–259, Annual #5
  - Al Milgrom #260
  - J.M. DeMatteis #261–264, 267–270, 272, 275–290, 292–300, Annual #6
  - Michael Carlin #301–306
  - Mark Gruenwald #307–422, 424–443, Annual #8, 10–12
  - Mark Waid #444–454, 695–704, Vol. 3 #1–23, Iron Man/Captain America Annual 1998
  - Rob Liefeld vol. 2 #1–6
  - Jeph Loeb vol. 2 #1–6, 12
  - James Robinson vol. 2 #7–11, 13
  - Tom DeFalco vol. 3 #24
  - Dan Jurgens vol. 3 #25–50, Annual 2000–2001
  - Kurt Busiek and Barbara Kesel Captain America/Citizen V Annual 1998
  - Joe Casey Annual 1999
  - Bill Rosemann vol. 3 #20–21, Annual 2000
  - John Ney Rieber vol. 4 #1–9, 12
  - Chuck Austen vol. 4 #8–16
  - Dave Gibbons vol. 4 #17–20
  - Robert Morales vol. 4 #21–28
  - Robert Kirkman vol. 4 #29–32
  - Ed Brubaker vol. 5 #1–50, #600–619, vol. 6 #1–19
  - Rick Remender vol. 7 #1–25
  - Nick Spencer vol. 8 #25
  - Ta-Nehisi Coates vol. 10 #1–30
  - Tochi Onyebuchi, Collin Kelly and Jackson Lanzing vol. 11 #0, #750
  - J. Michael Straczynski vol. 13 #1–16
  - Chip Zdarsky vol. 14 #1-ongoing
- Captain America and the Falcon
  - Christopher Priest #1–14
- Captain America: Sentinel of Liberty
  - Mark Waid #1–12
  - Collin Kelly and Jackson Lanzing vol. 2 #1–13
- All-New Captain America
  - Rick Remender #1–6
- Captain America: Sam Wilson
  - Nick Spencer #1–24
- Captain America: Steve Rogers
  - Nick Spencer #1–19
- Captain America: Symbol of Truth
  - Tochi Onyebuchi #1–14
- Sam Wilson: Captain America
  - Greg Pak and Evan Narcisse #1–5

== Collected editions ==
=== Marvel Masterworks: Golden Age Captain America ===
Title	Material collected	Year	ISBN
Volume 1	Captain America Comics #1–4	2005	0-7851-1619-2
Volume 2	Captain America Comics #5–8	2008	0-7851-2229-X
Volume 3	Captain America Comics #9–12	2009	0-7851-2878-6
Volume 4	Captain America Comics #13–16	2010	0-7851-3361-5
Volume 5	Captain America Comics #17–20	2011	0-7851-4202-9
Volume 6	Captain America Comics #21–24	2012	978-0785150244

=== Marvel Masterworks: Captain America ===
Title	Material collected	Year	ISBN
Volume 1	Tales of Suspense #59–81	1990	HC: 978-0785111764
Volume 2	Tales of Suspense #82–99, Captain America #100	2005	HC: 978-0785117858
Volume 3	Captain America #101–113	2006	HC: 978-0785120636
Volume 4	Captain America #114–124	2008	HC: 978-0785129363
Volume 5	Captain America #125–136	2010	HC: 978-0785142003
Volume 6	Captain America #137–148	2012	HC: 978-0785158752
Volume 7	Captain America #149–159	2014	HC: 978-0785187998
Volume 8	Captain America #160–175	2016	HC: 978-0785199298
Volume 9	Captain America #176–192; material from F.O.O.M. #8	2017	HC: 978-1302903459
Volume 10	Captain America #193–200; Captain America Annual #3; Marvel Treasury Special: Captain America's Bicentennial Battles	2018	HC: 978-1302909567
Volume 11	Captain America #201–214; Captain America Annual #4;	2019	HC: 978-1302917029
Volume 12	Captain America #215–230; The Incredible Hulk #232;	2020	HC: 978-1302922108
Volume 13	Captain America #231–246; Marvel Premiere #49;	2021	HC: 978-1302929251
Volume 14	Captain America #247–260	2022	HC: 978-1302933142
Volume 15	Captain America #261-269; Captain America Annual #5; Defenders #106	2023	HC: 978-1302949334
Volume 16	Captain America #270-280; Captain America Annual #6; material from Marvel Fanfare #5	2024	HC: 978-1302955212
Volume 17	Captain America #281-289; Captain America Annual #7; The Falcon #1-4	2025	HC: 978-1302962371

=== Essential Captain America ===
Title	Material collected	Year	ISBN
Volume 1	Tales of Suspense #59–99; Captain America #100–102	2000	0-7851-3006-3
Volume 2	Captain America #103–126	2010	0-7851-0827-0
Volume 3	Captain America #127–156	2010	0-7851-2166-8
Volume 4	Captain America #157–186	2010	0-7851-2770-4
Volume 5	Captain America #187–205, Annual #3, Marvel Treasury Special: Captain America's Bicentennial Battles	2010	0-7851-4535-4
Volume 6	Captain America #206–230, Annual #4; Incredible Hulk #232	2011	978-0-7851-5091-6
Volume 7	Captain America #231–257	2013	978-0-7851-8409-6

=== Captain America Epic Collections ===
Volume	Subtitle	Years covered	Issues collected	Pages	Publication date	ISBN
1	Captain America Lives Again	1963–1967	Strange Tales #114, Avengers #4, Tales of Suspense #58–96	488	November 26, 2014	978-0785188360
2	The Coming of...the Falcon	1968–1969	Tales of Suspense #97–99, Captain America #100–119 and material from Not Brand Echh #3, 12	480	September 21, 2016	978-1302900076
3	Bucky Reborn	1969–1971	Captain America #120–138	400	July 5, 2017	978-1302904197
4	Hero or Hoax?	1971–1973	Captain America #139–159	472	July 11, 2018	978-1302910037
5	The Secret Empire	1973-1974	Captain America #160-179	416	June 27, 2023	978-1302948733
6	The Man Who Sold the United States	1974-1976	Captain America #180-200, Marvel Treasury Edition Special: Captain America's Bicentennial Battles	512	April 16, 2024	978-1302955205
7	The Swine	1976-1978	Captain America #201-221, Annual #3-4	448	July 1, 2025	978-1302960520
9	Dawn's Early Light	1980–1982	Captain America #247–266, Annual #5	496	February 19, 2014	978-0785188667
10	Monsters and Men	1982-1983	Captain America #267–285, Annual #6; Defenders #106	504	October 14, 2020	978-1302923235
11	Sturm Und Drang	1983-1985	Captain America #286-301, Annual #7 and The Falcon #1-4	520	July 5, 2022	978-1302945367
12	Society of Serpents	1985–1986	Captain America #302–317 and material from Marvel Fanfare #18	432	August 20, 2014	978-0785188964
13	Justice Is Served	1986–1987	Captain America #318–332, Annual #8, Amazing Spider-Man #278 and material from Marvel Fanfare #29, 31–32	512	April 5, 2017	978-1302904203
14	The Captain	1987–1989	Captain America #333–350, Iron Man #228	502	July 27, 2021	978-1302930707
15	The Bloodstone Hunt	1989–1990	Captain America #351–371	496	April 25, 2018	978-1302910020
16	Streets of Poison	1990–1991	Captain America #372–386, Annual #9–10	512	June 17, 2015	978-0785192657
17	The Superia Stratagem	1991–1992	Captain America #387–397; Adventures of Captain America #1–4	472	March 20, 2019	978-1302916206
18	Blood and Glory	1992	Captain America #398-410; Punisher/Captain America: Blood and Glory #1–3	496	March 18, 2020	978-1302922795
19	Arena of Death	1992-1993	Captain America #411-419, Annual #11-12; Ghost Rider/Captain America: Fear #1; U.S.Agent #1-4 and material from Silver Sable & the Wild Pack #15	496	March 8, 2022	978-1302934453
20	Fighting Chance	1993-1995	Captain America #420-430, Annual #13; Nomad #18-19; Captain America: The Medusa Effect and Captain America/Nick Fury: Blood Truce	496	May 2, 2023	978-1302951566
21	Twilight's Last Gleaming	1995	Captain America #431-443; Tales of Suspense (1995) #1, Avengers #386-388	480	February 6, 2024	978-1302956349
22	Man Without a Country	1995–1996	Captain America #444–454, Ashcan Edition, Thor #496, Iron Man #326, Avengers #396, Captain America: The Legend and material from Captain America Collectors' Preview	456	April 20, 2016	978-0785195108
24	American Nightmare	1998–1999	Captain America (vol. 3) #1–14, Iron Man & Captain American Annual (1998), Captain America & Citizen V Annual (1998)	488	December 30, 2025	978-1302965273

=== Modern Era Epic Collection ===
Volume	Subtitle	Years covered	Issues collected	Pages	Publication date	ISBN
1	The Winter Soldier	2005-2006	Captain America (vol. 5) #1-17; Captain America 65th Anniversary Special; Captain America: Winter Soldier Director's Cut	472	June 18, 2024	978-1302956387
2	Death of the Dream	2006-2007	Captain America (vol. 5) #18-30, Captain America #25 Director's Cut, Winter Soldier: Winter Kills, Fallen Son: The Death of Captain America #1-5	520	October 22, 2024	978-1302956455
3	The Burden of Dreams	2007-2008	Captain America (vol. 5) #31-48, Captain America #34 Director's Cut	480	October 7, 2025	978-1302956486

=== Captain America (vols. 1 and 2) ===
Title	Material collected	Year	ISBN
Captain America and the Falcon: Secret Empire	Captain America #169–176	2017	SC: 978-1302904227
Captain America and the Falcon: Nomad	Captain America #177–186	2007	0-7851-2197-8
Captain America and the Falcon: Madbomb	Captain America #193–200	2004	0-7851-1557-9
Captain America: Bicentennial Battles	Captain America #201–205; Marvel Treasury Edition: Captain America's Bicentennial Battles	2005	0-7851-1726-1
Captain America and the Falcon: The Swine	Captain America #206–214, Annual #3–4	2006	0-7851-2078-5
Captain America: War and Remembrance	Captain America #247-255	2007	978-1302504236
Captain America: Deathlok Lives	Captain America #286–288	1993	0-7851-0019-9
Captain America: Death of the Red Skull	Captain America #290–301	2012	0-7851-5986-X
Captain America: Scourge of the Underworld	Captain America #318–320, U.S.Agent #1–4 and material from #358–362	2011	978-0-7851-4962-0
Captain America: The Captain	Captain America #332–350; Iron Man #228	2011	978-0-7851-4965-1
Captain America: Man and Wolf	Captain America #402–408	2011	978-0-7851-4961-3
Captain America: Fighting Chance: Denial	Captain America #425–430	2009	0-7851-3738-6
Captain America: Fighting Chance: Acceptance	Captain America #431–437	2009	0-7851-3739-4
Heroes Reborn: Captain America	Captain America vol. 2 #1–12	2006	0-7851-2339-3
Heroes Reborn: Captain America	Captain America vol. 2 #1–12; Fantastic Four vol. 2 #12, Avengers vol. 2 #12, Iron Man vol. 2 #12, and material from Heroes Reborn #1/2	2020	978-1302923457

=== Captain America (vols. 3 and 4, Marvel Knights, Cap/Falcon) ===
Title	Material collected	Year	ISBN
Captain America: To Serve and Protect	Captain America vol. 3 #1–7	2011	0-7851-0838-6
Captain America: American Nightmare	Captain America vol. 3 #8–13, Captain America/Citizen V Annual 1998, Iron Man/Captain America Annual 1998	2011	978-0-7851-5084-8
Captain America: Red Glare	Captain America vol. 3 #14–19, Captain America Spotlight	2011	0-7851-5894-4
Captain America: Land of the Free	Captain America vol. 3 #20–24, Annual 1999	2013	0-7851-5082-X
Captain America: Heroes Return - The Complete Collection Vol.1	Captain America vol. 3 #1-12, Captain America/Citizen V Annual 1998, Iron Man/Captain America Annual 1998	2021	978-1302923242
Captain America: Heroes Return - The Complete Collection Vol.2	Captain America vol. 3 #13-24, Captain America Annual 1999	2022	978-1302931711
Captain America by Dan Jurgens, Vol. 1	Captain America vol. 3 #25–34	2011	0-7851-5517-1
Captain America by Dan Jurgens, Vol. 2	Captain America vol. 3 #35–44, Annual 2000	2011	0-7851-5540-6
Captain America By Dan Jurgens, Vol. 3	Captain America vol. 3 #45–50, Annual 2001	2012	0-7851-5980-0
Captain America: Marvel Knights Vol. 1	Captain America vol. 4 #1–16	2016	SC: 978-0785196334
Captain America: Marvel Knights Vol. 2	Captain America vol. 4: #17–32; Captain America: Red, White & Blue	2017	SC: 978-1302904210
Captain America Vol. 1: The New Deal	Captain America vol. 4 #1–6	2003	0-7851-1101-8
Captain America Vol. 2: The Extremists	Captain America vol. 4 #7–11	2003	0-7851-1102-6
Captain America, Vol. 3: Ice	Captain America vol. 4, #12–16	2003	0-7851-1103-4
Captain America Vol. 4: Cap Lives	Captain America vol. 4 #17–20; Tales of Suspense #66	2004	0-7851-1318-5
Captain America Vol. 5: Homeland	Captain America vol. 4 #21–28	2004	0-7851-1396-7
Captain America and the Falcon Vol. 1: Two Americas	Captain America and the Falcon #1–4	2004	0-7851-1424-6
Avengers Disassembled: Captain America	Captain America vol. 4 #29–32; Captain America and the Falcon #5–7	2004	0-7851-1648-6
Captain America and the Falcon Vol. 2: Brothers and Keepers	Captain America and the Falcon #8–14	2005	0-7851-1568-4
Captain America and the Falcon by Christopher Priest: The Complete Collection	Captain America and the Falcon #1–14	2016	SC: 978-0785195269

=== Captain America (Brubaker era) ===
Title	Material collected	Year	ISBN
Captain America: Winter Soldier Ultimate Collection	Captain America vol. 5 #1–9, 11–14	2010	SC: 978-0785143413
Captain America: Red Menace Ultimate Collection	Captain America vol. 5 #15–21; Captain America 65th Anniversary Special	2011	SC: 978-0785156178
The Death of Captain America: The Complete Collection	Captain America vol. 5 #22–42; Winter Soldier: Winter Kills	2013	SC: 978-0785183792
Captain America: Civil War	Captain America vol. 5 #22–24; Winter Soldier: Winter Kills; Iron Man #13–14; Iron Man/Captain America: Casualties of War; Civil War: The Confession	2016	SC: 978-0785195634
Captain America: The Man with No Face	Captain America vol. 5 #43–48	2009	0-7851-3163-9
Captain America: Road to Reborn	Captain America vol. 5 #49–50; Captain America #600–601	2010	0-7851-4174-X
Captain America: Reborn	Captain America: Reborn #1–6	2010	0-7851-3998-2
Captain America: Two Americas	Captain America #602–605; Captain America: Who Will Wield The Shield?	2010	0-7851-4510-9
Captain America: No Escape	Captain America #606–610	2011	0-7851-4512-5
Steve Rogers: Super Soldier	Steve Rogers: Super-Soldier #1–4	2011	0-7851-4878-7
Steve Rogers: Super Soldier - The Complete Collection	Steve Rogers: Super-Soldier #1–4, and Annual #1, Uncanny X-Men Annual #3, and Namor: The First Muntant Annual #1	2011	978-1-302-90873-7
Captain America: The Trial of Captain America	Captain America #611–615 and #615.1; material from Captain America 70th Anniversary Magazine	2011	0-7851-5119-2
Captain America: Prisoner of War	Captain America #616–619	2012	0785151214
Captain America and Bucky: The Life Story of Bucky Barnes	Captain America and Bucky #620–624	2012	0-78-515123-0
Captain America and Bucky: Old Wounds	Captain America and Bucky #625–628	2012	0-7851-6083-3
Captain America and Hawkeye	Captain America and Hawkeye #629–632	2012	978-0785160861
Captain America and Iron Man	Captain America and Iron Man #633–635; Captain America and Namor #635.1	2012	978-0785165781
Captain America and Black Widow	Captain America and Black Widow #636–640	2013	978-0785165286
Captain America and the Avengers: The Complete Collection	Captain America and Hawkeye #629–632; Captain America and Iron Man #633–635; Captain America and Black Widow #636–640; Captain America and Namor #635.1	2017	SC: 978-1302908584
Captain America by Ed Brubaker Vol. 1	Captain America vol. 6 #1–5	2012	978-0785157083
Captain America by Ed Brubaker Vol. 2	Captain America vol. 6 #6–10	2012	978-0785157106
Captain America by Ed Brubaker Vol. 3	Captain America vol. 6 #11–14	2012	978-0785160755
Captain America by Ed Brubaker Vol. 4	Captain America vol. 6 #15–19	2013	978-0785160779
Captain America: Theater of War - The Complete Collection	Captain America: Theater of War - America The Beautiful #1, A Brother in Arms #1, To Soldier On #1, Ghosts of My Country #1, America First #1, Operation Zero Point #1 and Prisoners of Duty #1	2016	978-0785196013

=== Marvel NOW!: Captain America ===
Title	Material collected	Year	ISBN
Captain America Vol. 1: Castaway in Dimension Z Book One	Captain America vol. 7 #1–5	2013	978-0785168263
Captain America Vol. 2: Castaway in Dimension Z Book Two	Captain America vol. 7 #6–10	2013	978-0785168270
Captain America Vol. 3: Loose Nuke	Captain America vol. 7 #11–15	2014	978-0785189510
Captain America Vol. 4: The Iron Nail	Captain America vol. 7 #16–21	2014	978-0785189534
Captain America Vol. 5: The Tomorrow Soldier	Captain America vol. 7 #22–25, and material from Marvel 75th Anniversary Celebration	Jan 2015	978-0785189558

=== All-New Captain America / Captain America: Sam Wilson / Captain America: Steve Rogers ===
Title	Material collected	Year	ISBN
All-New Captain America: Fear Him	All-New Captain America Fear Him #1–4; Captain America #280; Avengers #64	2015	SC: 978-0785192589
Amazing Spider-Man/Inhuman/All-New Captain America: Inhuman Error	All-New Captain America Special #1; Amazing Spider-Man Special #1; Inhuman Special #1	2016	SC: 978-0785195153
All-New Captain America Vol. 1: Hydra Ascendant	All-New Captain America #1–6	2016	SC: 978-0785192329
Captain America: Sam Wilson Vol. 1: Not My Captain America	Captain America: Sam Wilson #1–6	2016	SC: 978-0785196402
Captain America: Sam Wilson Vol. 2: Standoff	Captain America: Sam Wilson #7–8; Assault on Pleasant Hill Alpha #1; Assault on Pleasant Hill Omega #1	2016	SC: 978-0785196419
Captain America: Sam Wilson Vol. 3: Civil War II	Captain America: Sam Wilson #9–13	2017	SC: 978-1302903190
Captain America: Sam Wilson Vol. 4: #TakeBackTheShield	Captain America: Sam Wilson #14–17	2017	SC: 978-1302903299
Captain America: Sam Wilson Vol. 5: End of the Line	Captain America: Sam Wilson #18–21	2017	SC: 978-1302906146
Captain America: Steve Rogers Vol. 1: Hail Hydra	Captain America: Steve Rogers #1–6; material from Free Comic Book Day 2016 #1	2016	SC: 978-1302901127
Captain America: Steve Rogers Vol. 2: The Trial of Maria Hill	Captain America: Steve Rogers #7–11	2017	SC: 978-1302901134
Captain America: Steve Rogers Vol. 3: Empire Building	Captain America: Steve Rogers #12–16, Civil War II: The Oath #1	2017	SC: 978-1302906146
Captain America: Secret Empire	Captain America: Steve Rogers #17–19; Captain America: Sam Wilson #22–24	2017	SC: 978-1302908492
Captain America: Sam Wilson - The Complete Collection Vol. 1	Captain America (vol. 4) #25, All-New Captain America: Fear Him #1-4, All-New Captain America #1-6, Amazing Spiderman Special #1, Inhuman Special #1, All-New Captain America Special #1, Captain America: Sam Wilson #1-6	2020	978-1302923259
Captain America: Sam Wilson - The Complete Collection Vol. 2	Captain America: Sam Wilson #7-24, Captain America (vol. 8) #25, Generations: Sam Wilson Captain America & Steve Rogers Captain America #1	2021	978-1302922979

=== Captain America (Waid era) ===
Title	Material collected	Publication date	ISBN
Captain America by Waid & Samnee: Home of the Brave	Captain America #695-700	June 2018	978-1302909925
Captain America by Mark Waid: Promised Land	Captain America #701-704	September 2018	978-1302909932

=== Captain America (vol. 9) ===
Title	Material collected	Publication date	ISBN
Captain America Vol. 1: Winter in America	Captain America vol. 9 #1-6, material from Free Comic Book Day 2018 (Avengers/Captain America) #1	March 5, 2019	978-1-302-911942
Captain America Vol. 2: Captain of Nothing	Captain America vol. 9 #7-12	October 8, 2019	978-1-302-911959
Captain America Vol. 3: The Legend of Steve	Captain America vol. 9 #13-19	April 7, 2020	978-1-302-914417
Captain American Vol. 4: All Die Young	Captain America vol. 9 #20-25	February 23, 2021	978-1-302-920401
Captain American Vol. 5: All Die Young Part 2	Captain America vol. 9 #26-30	September 1, 2021	978-1-302-920418
Captain America by Ta-Nehisi Coates Vol. 1	Captain America vol. 9 #1-12	April 7, 2020	978-1-302-923228
Captain America by Ta-Nehisi Coates Vol. 2	Captain America vol. 9 #13-30	March 1, 2022	978-1-302-925437

=== Captain America: Sentinel of Liberty / Captain America: Symbol of Truth ===
Title	Material collected	Publication date	ISBN
Captain America: Symbol of Truth Vol. 1: Homeland	Captain America vol. 10 #0, Captain America: Symbol of Truth #1-5	December 20, 2022	978-1-302-945404
Captain America: Symbol Of Truth Vol. 2: Pax Mohannda	Captain America: Symbol of Truth #6-11	June 20, 2023	978-1-302-945411
Captain America: Sentinel of Liberty Vol. 1: Revolution	Captain America vol. 10 #0, Captain America: Sentinel of Liberty vol. 2 #1-6	February 7, 2023	978-1-302-931438
Captain America: Sentinel of Liberty Vol. 2: The Invader	Captain America & the Winter Soldier Special #1, Captain America: Sentinel of Liberty vol. 2 #7-11	August 1, 2023	978-1-302-931445

=== Captain America Vol. 11 & Sam Wilson: Captain America ===
#	Title	Material collected	Pages	Publication date	ISBN
1	Stand	Captain America vol. 11 #1–6	160	May 7, 2024	978-1302955670
2	Trying to Come Home	Captain America vol. 11 #7-12	120	November 5, 2024	978-1302955687
3	Vol. 3	Captain America vol. 11 #13-16	112	May 6, 2025	978-1302955694
	Better Angels	Sam Wison: Captain America #1-5	120	September 2, 2025	978-1302963064

=== Captain America Omnibus ===
Title	Material collected	Year	ISBN
Golden Age Captain America Omnibus Vol. 1	Captain America Comics #1–12	2014, 2021	HC: 978-0785168072, 978-1302926694
Golden Age Captain America Omnibus Vol. 2	Captain America Comics #13–24	Aug. 2021	HC: 978-1302926717
Captain America Omnibus Vol. 1	Tales of Suspense #59–99; Captain America #100–113; Not Brand Echh #3	2016, May 2024	HC: 978-1302901615, 978-1302957995
Captain America Omnibus Vol. 2	Captain America #114–148	2016, October 2024	HC: 978-0785199274
Captain America Omnibus Vol. 3	Captain America #149-192; material from Giant-Size Captain America #1; F.O.O.M. #8	Aug. 2021, December 2024	HC: 978-1302930424
Captain America Omnibus Vol. 4	Captain America #193–214; Captain America Annual #3–4; Marvel Treasury Edition: Captain America's Bicentennial Battles, F.O.O.M. #11	March 2024	HC: 978-1302955137
Captain America by Jack Kirby	Captain America #193–214; Captain America Annual #3–4; Marvel Treasury Edition: Captain America's Bicentennial Battles	2011, 2021	978-0785149606 978-1302928216
Captain America by Mark Gruenwald Omnibus Vol. 1	Captain America vol. 1 #307–350; Captain America Annual #7; Marvel Fanfare #28; Amazing Spider-Man #278; Iron Man #228; and material from Marvel Fanfare #26, 31-32	June 2024	HC: 978-1302956875
Captain America by Mark Waid, Ron Garney & Andy Kubert Omnibus	Captain America vol. 1 #444–454; Captain America vol. 3 #1–23; Iron Man/Captain America Annual 1998; Captain America: Sentinel of Liberty #1–12 (rough cut); material from Captain America: The Legend; Captain America: Red, White & Blue	2017	HC: 978-1302908317
Captain America by Dan Jurgens Omnibus	Captain America vol. 3 #25-50; Captain America Annual 2000-2001; material from Captain America: The Legend	Aug. 2021	HC: 978-1302930417
Captain America by Ed Brubaker	Captain America vol. 5 #1–25; Captain America 65th Anniversary Special; Winter Soldier: Winter Kills	2007, Feb. 2021	978-0785128663, 978-1302927929
The Death of Captain America	Captain America vol. 5 #25–42	2009, Aug. 2021	978-0785138068, 978-1302929619
Captain America Lives	Captain America vol. 5 #43–50; Captain America #600–601; Captain America: Reborn #1–6	2011, Mar. 2022, Sept. 2023	978-0785145141, 978-1302932428, 978-1302954468
Captain America: The Trial of Captain America Omnibus	Captain America: Who Will Wield The Shield?; Captain America (2005) #602–610; Steve Rogers: Super-Soldier #1–4; Captain America (2005) #611–619, #615.1; Captain America (2011) #1–10	Dec. 2014, Oct. 2023	978-0785192725, 978-1302952686
Captain America: Return of the Winter Soldier Omnibus	Captain America and Bucky #620–628, Fear Itself: Captain America #7.1, Winter Soldier #1–5, Captain America (2011) #11–19, Winter Soldier #6–14	May 2015, Nov. 2023	978-0785192718, 978-1302952631
Captain America by Rick Remender Omnibus	Captain America (2012) #1-25; "Winter Soldier: The Bitter March" (2014) #1-5, "All-New Captain America: Fear Him" (2015) #1-4, "All-New Captain America" (2014) #1-6, "Hail Hydra" (2015) #1-4	Sept. 2021	978-1302930479
Captain America by Nick Spencer Omnibus Vol. 1	Captain America: Sam Wilson (2015) #1-17, Captain America: Steve Rogers (2016) #1-11, Avengers Standoff: Welcome to Pleasant Hill (2016) #1, Avengers Standoff: Assault on Pleasant Hill Alpha (2016) #1, Avengers Standoff: Assault on Pleasant Hill Omega (2016) #1, Civil War II: The Oath (2017) #1, material from Free Comic Book Day 2016 (Captain America) #1	Feb. 2023	HC: 978-1302949617
Captain America by Nick Spencer Omnibus Vol. 2	Captain America: Sam Wilson (2015) #18-24, Captain America: Steve Rogers (2016) #12-19, Captain America (2017) #25, Secret Empire (2017) #0-10, Secret Empire Omega (2017) #1, Generations: Sam Wilson Captain America & Steve Rogers Attain America (2017) #1, material from Free Comic Book Day 2017 (Secret Empire) #1, Not Brand Ecch (2018) #1	May 2024	HC: 978-1302953706
Captain America by Ta-Nehisi Coates Omnibus	Captain America (2018) #1-30 and material from Free Comic Book Day 2018 (Avengers/Captain America)	July 2023	978-1302948474
