= Nomad (Marvel Comics) =

Fictional character from Marvel Comics

- Cover to Nomad #1 (November 1990). Art by James Fry.

Publication information
- Publisher: Marvel Comics
- First appearance: Steve Rogers (as Nomad): Captain America #180 (December 1974); Edward Ferbel: Captain America #261 (September 1981); Jack Monroe (as Nomad): Captain America #282 (June 1983)
- Created by: Steve Rogers: Steve Englehart (writer); Sal Buscema (artist); Edward Ferbel: J. M. DeMatteis (writer); Mike Zeck (artist); Jack Monroe: Fabian Nicieza (writer); James Fry (artist); Pat Olliffe (writer); S. Clarke Hawbaker (artist)

In-story information
- Alter ego: Kochnik Goldavik
- Team affiliations: Secret Defenders
- Partnerships: 1950s "Captain America"; Captain America; Falcon; D-Man
- Notable aliases: Bucky, Scourge, Jack Barnes
- Abilities: Artificially enhanced physiology at a slightly higher level than Captain America; Expert marksman Skilled in many martial arts and acrobatics Primary weapons are throwing discs called "stun discs", and later in his career used firearms

Nomad is the name of several fictional characters appearing in American comic books published by Marvel Comics. The Nomad name and costume were created by writer Steve Englehart and artist Sal Buscema as an alternate identity for the original Captain America, Steve Rogers, in Captain America #180 (December 1974).

The identity was revived by writer J. M. DeMatteis for a minor character named Edward Ferbel in Captain America #261–263 (September–November 1981). The same writer later gave the title to its best known claimant Jack Monroe in Captain America #282 (June 1983). Other claimants of the code name are Rikki Barnes and Steve Rogers's adopted son Ian Rogers.

== Fictional character biography ==
=== Steve Rogers ===
Cover to Captain America #180, the first appearance of Steve Rogers as the original Nomad. Art by Gil Kane.

The original Nomad is an alternate identity that Steve Rogers adopts after he abandons the Captain America costume and title.

In Captain America #180 (December 1974) Rogers becomes disillusioned with the United States government, when he discovers that a high ranking government official (heavily hinted to be the then President of the United States Richard Nixon) is the leader of the terrorist organization known as the Secret Empire.

Rogers decides to abandon his Captain America identity, feeling that he cannot continue to serve America after this latest discovery has shattered his faith in the nation's status. A confrontation with Hawkeye (disguised as the Golden Archer) forces Rogers to realize that he cannot abandon a life of heroism, and he subsequently takes on the name "Nomad" (as it means "man without a country") adopting a new dark blue and yellow uniform with no patriotic markings on it at all.

This identity is short-lived, with Rogers maintaining it for a mere four issues of the comic to varying degrees of success; he even trips over his own cape at one point. At the conclusion of Captain America #184 (April 1975) Rogers returns to the role of Captain America when he realizes that he could champion America's ideas without blindly supporting its government.

=== Edward Ferbel ===
Introduced in Captain America #261 (September 1981), the second Nomad was Edward Ferbel, a short-lived character who is given the Nomad costume and equipment by the Red Skull in an effort to discredit Captain America.

He is killed by an agent of the Skull, the Ameridroid, in Captain America #263 (November 1981).

=== Jack Monroe ===
The third and best known Nomad is Jack Monroe, who was formerly known as the third Bucky. He was created by writer Steve Englehart and artist Sal Buscema in Captain America #153 (September 1972) to explain Bucky's appearances in the 1953-1955 Captain America run. During the "Captain America No More" story arc, when Rogers was forced to abandon his identity as Captain America by a US Government committee, Monroe offered to let Rogers become Nomad again, but Rogers declined and took a new identity, The Captain, for the interim.

=== Rikki Barnes ===
After the events of the Onslaught Reborn mini-series, a version of Rikki Barnes, the female Bucky established in the Heroes Reborn Captain America series, now resides in the mainstream Marvel Universe, and has befriended the Young Avenger known as Patriot in the hopes of contacting the new Captain America (the original Bucky, now free of his Winter Soldier programming). In September 2009, Rikki Barnes took on the identity of Nomad in the mini-series, Nomad: Girl Without A World, by Sean McKeever and David Baldeon.

=== Ian Rogers ===
While trapped in the mysterious Dimension Z, Captain America rescues Leopold, the infant son of Arnim Zola. Raising the child under the name "Ian", he manages to evade Zola's forces for eleven years, until Ian is accidentally shot and apparently killed by Sharon Carter. After Captain America escapes Dimension Z, Ian is revealed to have survived and taken up a costume and shield similar to that of his adoptive father. Now calling himself Nomad, Ian acts as the defender of Dimension Z.

During the AXIS storyline, Nomad assists Steve Rogers and Spider-Man in rescuing Loki in Las Vegas.

== Sources ==
- International Catalogue of Super-Heroes page on Bucky
