= Young Allies (Marvel Comics) =

Fictional comic book groups

Young Allies is the name of three superhero teams appearing in American comic books published by Marvel Comics.

== Golden Age ==
The Golden Age's Young Allies were a gang of kids who fought the Axis. Their line-up included the two key sidekicks (Bucky Barnes and Toro) of then-prominent Timely Comics heroes Captain America and the Human Torch.

=== Creation ===
Created by Joe Simon and Jack Kirby as the Sentinels of Liberty, "a multiracial group of patriotic kids", the group was led by Bucky Barnes (Captain America's teenage sidekick), and initially made up of his four friends: Knuckles (Percival Aloysius O'Toole), Jeff (Jefferson Worthing Sandervilt), Tubby (Henry Tinkle), and Whitewash Jones (Washington Jones). The group appeared in a text feature in Captain America #4 (June 1941), but were swiftly moved into the comic-proper to help Cap in his battles, and became popular enough to be spun into its own title.

In American Comic Book Chronicles: 1940-1944, Kurt Mitchell and Roy Thomas take a negative view of the group, describing the four new characters: "Jefferson "Jeff" Sandervilt was the brainy kid, Percival Aloysius "Knuckles" O'Toole the tough kid, Henry "Tubby" Tinkle the fat kid, and (alas) Whitewash Jones the harmonica-playing, watermelon-loving, racist-caricature kid".

According to Jess Nevins' Encyclopedia of Golden Age Superheroes, "they primarily fight Axis agents: the Red Skull, Agent Zero, the Monk, the Black Talon, the Khan, the Owl, and so on. There are also ordinary gangsters and name criminals like the Doll-Devil, the Python, and the Mad Fiend of Horror Castle".

=== The Young Allies (1941) ===
Young Allies Comics #1 (Summer 1941). Art by Jack Kirby.

Launched in summer 1941 after only a couple of appearances in the pages of Captain America, the "Sentinels of Liberty" were revised, renamed "The Young Allies" and joined by the original Human Torch's sidekick Toro. By this time, Simon and Kirby were in the process of leaving Timely for DC Comics, and relationships were strained, so while the first issue of the Young Allies series was pencilled by Kirby (under the shared "Charles Nicholas" pseudonym), it was written by Otto Binder. By issue #2, Kirby had left, and the art duties were taken over by Al Gabriele and former Captain America inker (and then penciler, in the wake of Simon and Kirby's departure) Syd Shores; art duties would change considerably over the course of the title's run. A young Stan Lee began writing with the third issue. It is not known who wrote the second, although Lee began his tenure as series editor with that issue.

The first issue saw the (mostly non-superhero) team fight Captain America's nemesis the Red Skull, and is often labelled as "the first ongoing comic to team up characters from two or more other Marvel series". The team frequently traveled the world to participate in World War II skirmishes and, in keeping with the somewhat exaggerated scope of the series, eventually literally beat up all three major Axis leaders: Adolf Hitler, Benito Mussolini, and Hideki Tojo, something that none of their elders accomplished.

Young Allies Comics lasted until issue #20 (October 1946), and also appeared in Amazing Comics, Complete Comics and Kid Komics. Toro and Bucky would continue to team-up briefly, "as members of the All-Winners Squad ... [b]ut Knuckles, Jeff, Tubby and Whitewash weren't seen again".

In the Young Allies Comics 70th Anniversary Special (2009), their comic book adventures are revealed to be fictional retellings of their real exploits. Their real names are Pat O'Toole, Washington Carver Jones, Geoffrey Worthington Vandergill, and Henry Yosef Tinklebaum. The first two are still alive in the modern day. With the original series, indicia title was simply "Young Allies"--"Comics" was part of the cover title for only the first two issues.

== Heroes Reborn ==
Young Allies

Publication information
- Publisher: Marvel Comics
- First appearance: Heroes Reborn: Young Allies (January 2000)
- Created by: Fabian Nicieza; Mark Bagley

In-story information
- Member(s): Bucky (Rikki Barnes); I.Q. Jolt; Kid Colt; O and K Toro

The second group of Young Allies was founded on the Heroes Reborn world, now called Counter-Earth, after the Avengers and Fantastic Four returned home and the planet suffered several devastating blows in the wake of their leaving. While several members share codenames with their predecessors on Earth-616, they have little else in common with the prior group.

- Bucky (Rikki Barnes) - Captain America's partner from his time on the HR world. She is the most like her Earth-616 counterpart. She uses a photonic shield as a weapon, and is the group's leader.
- I.Q. (Ishmael Questor) - A heavily deformed, quadriplegic telepath and analyst, who works with the Young Allies from his protective, life-sustaining tank in his Earth's Germany.
- Kid Colt (Elric Whitemane, born Elric Freedom) - Captured by the world's corrupt S.H.I.E.L.D. and experimented on, and bonded to Kymellian DNA, allowing him to assume a humanoid horse form and open miniature wormholes for teleportation.
- O and K - Manifestations of Order and Chaos, sent to judge whether Counter-Earth deserved to continue to exist.
- Toro (Benito Serrano) - Can turn into a super-strong humanoid bull.

=== Fictional history ===
The Young Allies came into conflict with the Redeemers, a government-backed team related to the Thunderbolts, while the Redeemers were supervised by Captain America, who, due to amnesia, had forgotten his time on the other Earth with the Allies' Bucky. The conflict was caused by Allies' creation of a hoax chemical weapons scare in the "main" Earth's Latveria in an attempt to force Doctor Doom, the then-ruler of Counter-Earth, to distribute food and medicine more evenly. When they left, Bucky was left sore that Cap thought she would be capable of really using a WMD, causing Cap to lie to Doom that other canisters had been hidden. Later, they encountered the Thunderbolts themselves on their homeworld, while a rift was threatening to destroy both worlds. When the crisis was resolved and the Thunderbolts returned home, Jolt remained behind with the team.

Later, the Exiles visited Counter-Earth to save it from Proteus, in their teammate Morph's body. At first, Proteus convinced the Young Allies to fight the Exiles. The Young Allies later figured out the truth when Proteus was enjoying torturing the Exiles. Proteus seemed to be winning, but two cosmic entities known as "O" and "K" ripped Proteus away from the Exiles, saying that they have been waiting for him. They supplied Proteus with an army of nukes. Empress Dorma and Proteus soon clashed, resulting in Proteus taking Dorma's crown, drying up Atlantis, and killing her and her soldiers. The Exiles arrived with the Young Allies at Atlantis. Proteus then launched the nukes. Luckily, Colt and Jolt stopped the nukes without detonating them. Proteus had the Exiles and the Young Allies on the ropes when he put his crown back on. Unbeknownst to him, however, Blink rigged it with a behavior modifier, causing Proteus to believe he really is Morph and being trapped in Morph's body. The Exiles then teleported back to Panoptichron and sent the last remaining nukes into space. The Young Allies then thanked the Exiles for saving their world from the nukes, Dorma, and Proteus as they left.

== Heroic Age ==
As part of the Heroic Age line-wide relaunch, a new team and ongoing series was introduced, written by Sean McKeever, with art by David Baldeon. McKeever has said:

The idea behind Young Allies is that it's literally a group of young allies. It's not so much a team in the conventional sense as it is a group of like-minded people of the same generation. The basic idea for the book is that they're fighting for the soul of their generation. That comes to the fore immediately with the introduction of the Bastards of Evil, who are the unwanted sons and daughters of supervillains of course ...

Members include Nomad, Firestar, Spider-Girl, Gravity and Toro (Benito Serrano). The series was cancelled with Young Allies #6. They become a team in Onslaught Unleashed #1. They also appear with the Avengers Academy in Avengers Academy Giant-Size #1 (80-page one-shot), at the Avengers Academy prom night in Avengers Academy #13, the Fear Itself: Youth in Revolt mini-series, and the "Spider-Island" saga.

== Collected editions ==
Some of the comics have been collected into individual volumes:

- Marvel Masterworks: Golden Age Young Allies, Volume 1 collects Young Allies Comics #1-4, 274 pages, hardcover, July 2009, ISBN 0-7851-2876-X
- Marvel Masterworks: Golden Age Young Allies, Volume 2 collects Young Allies Comics #5-8, 280 pages, hardcover, April 2011, ISBN 0-7851-5030-7
- Young Allies - Volume 1 by Sean McKeever and David Baldeon collects Young Allies (2010) #1 - 6 (August 2010 - January 2011), Firestar (2010) #1 one-shot (June 2010) and Gravity back-up story from Age of Heroes (2010) #2 (August 2010), 192 pages, paperback, February 2011, ISBN 0-7851-4868-X
