= Bucky (Marvel Comics) =

Publication information
- Publisher: Marvel Comics
- First appearance: Bucky Barnes: Captain America Comics #1 (March 1941); Fred Davis: Marvel Premiere #30 (1976); Jack Monroe: Captain America #153 (Sept. 1972); Rick Jones: The Incredible Hulk #1 (May 1962); Lemar Hoskins: Captain America #323 (Nov. 1986); Rikki Barnes: Captain America vol. 2 #1 (Nov. 1996); Julia Winters: Captain America vol. 5 #7 (July 2005)
- Created by: Bucky Barnes: Joe Simon (writer) Jack Kirby (artist); Fred Davis: Roy Thomas (writer) Don Heck (artist); Jack Monroe: Steve Englehart (writer) Sal Buscema (artist); Rick Jones: Stan Lee (writer) Jack Kirby (artist); Lemar Hoskins: Mark Gruenwald (writer) Paul Neary (artist); Rikki Barnes: Jeph Loeb (writer) Rob Liefeld (artist)

Bucky is the name used by several different fictional characters appearing in American comic books published by Marvel Comics, usually as a sidekick to Captain America. The original version was created by Joe Simon and Jack Kirby and first appeared in Captain America Comics #1 (cover-dated March 1941), which was published by Marvel's predecessor, Timely Comics. Following the apparent death of the hero James "Bucky" Barnes, the Bucky nickname and costume (or one based on the uniform used by Barnes) have been used by various heroes, including Fred Davis, Jack Monroe, Rick Jones, Lemar Hoskins, and Rikki Barnes. For a time, a child looked after by Jack Monroe was named "Bucky," but she was later adopted and given the name Julia Winters.

== James Buchanan Barnes ==
James Buchanan "Bucky" Barnes was the first individual to operate as a costumed hero called Bucky. Despite his young age, his life on army bases and special training sessions make him a formidable combatant and marksman. In 1941, Steve Rogers is experimented on by Operation: Rebirth, making him a super-soldier thanks to a special serum and "vita-ray" treatment developed by Abraham Erskine. Assigned the costumed identity of Captain America, Steve operates as a special military operative during World War II and soon adopts Bucky Barnes as his young partner. Though he accepts wearing a colorful costume and mask when he and Steve are on missions, Bucky declines using a special codename and simply uses his own nickname. Since "Bucky" is a common nickname, Bucky's friends and family do not deduce his identity.

Bucky's original comic book career came to a stop in 1948, when a story said he was wounded and retired. In 1964, Stan Lee and Jack Kirby reintroduced Captain America to comics after the character had been missing for many years. The new stories said that Steve Rogers and Bucky Barnes stopped a plot by Heinrich Zemo in 1945, but the result of this was that Bucky was killed in an explosion and Steve was left frozen alive in the waters of the North Atlantic, kept alive and in suspended animation due to the super-soldier serum in his veins. Thanks to this, the Avengers found Steve in 1964 and revived him from suspended animation. Later comics retconned that the stories of Captain America and Bucky published after 1945 and before 1964 depicted different characters who assumed the mantles of Steve Rogers and Bucky Barnes following their apparent deaths.

Decades after his death had been established, Bucky Barnes was brought back into comics. It is said that he miraculously survived the explosion in 1945, though he lost a limb and suffered brain damage. Following this, he is recovered by Hydra, given a cybernetic limb, and brainwashed into becoming an assassin called the Winter Soldier before Captain America uses the Cosmic Cube to restore his mind. The Winter Soldier then becomes a hero seeking redemption for his past actions. When Steve Rogers is later apparently assassinated, Bucky assumes the role of Captain America. He gives up this role soon after Steve returns to active duty.

In the 2011 crossover Fear Itself, Bucky is killed by Skadi, but is revived with the Infinity Formula, a weaker version of the super-soldier formula. As a result, he gains enhanced vitality and physical abilities.

=== Powers and abilities ===
Having trained under Steve Rogers (the original Captain America in World War II) and others, "Bucky" Barnes is a skilled marksman, a master of hand-to-hand combat and martial arts, and a gifted advance scout. He has particular skill with daggers and throwing knives. His time as the covert assassin Winter Soldier further honed his skills and increased his espionage prowess. He is also fluent in many languages.

Winter Soldier's left arm is a cybernetic prosthetic with superhuman strength and a variety of weapons and high-tech devices. As a result of gaining the Infinity Formula, Bucky Barnes has enhanced vitality. His general strength, resiliency to injury, speed, stamina, and agility are also a few times greater than a normal human being of his size and physical build. None of his traits operate on superhuman levels (not counting the use of his cyborg arm) and he does not operate at the level of a super-soldier such as Steve Rogers.

Bucky Barnes often carries several conventional weapons such as knives, guns, and grenades. As Captain America, Bucky Barnes used the indestructible, vibranium-iron alloy shield used by Steve Rogers, and wore a Kevlar/Nomex blend, shock-absorbing costume.

== Fred Davis ==
Fred Davis Jr., created by Roy Thomas and Don Heck, first appeared in Marvel Premiere #30 (1976, Marvel Comics) as a young character asked to temporarily impersonate Bucky in 1942. Starting with What If? #4 (1977) by Steven Englehart and Sal Buscema, it was said that Fred Davis assumed the Bucky identity following the apparent death of Bucky Barnes. Since Stan Lee and Jack Kirby established in 1964 that Barnes seemingly died in 1945, Fred Davis was used to retroactively explain the young hero's appearances in comics published between 1945 and 1948, as well as the series All-Winners Comics.

In Fred's introduction story, he is a teenage batboy for the New York Yankees, a few years younger than the heroic Bucky Barnes. In 1942, the heroic team known as the Invaders is hypnotized by the villain Red Skull, Bucky escapes. The young hero encounters Jeff Mace, the masked adventurer called Patriot, and together they join with other heroes to create the Liberty Legion. The Red Skull then sends his hypnotized Invaders against the Liberty Legion. During this adventure, Bucky hides his true movements and plans by asking Fred Davis to temporarily wear his costume and impersonate him. The Invaders are freed from hypnotic control and return to the European Theatre with Bucky, while the Liberty Legion remains as the "home front" team in the U.S. From that point on, both teams aid each other whenever necessary. Fred Davis then resumes his normal life, thrilled to have been able to help America's superheroes.

Barely over two years later, Bucky Barnes and Steve Rogers are seemingly killed. President Harry Truman fears the death of Captain America and his young friend will be a blow to American morale. He asks William Naslund, the hero known as Spirit of '76, to assume the Captain America identity. Fred Davis is contacted as well and asked to operate as the new Bucky. Only other superheroes and a few people who have worked personally with Bucky realize that Davis cannot be the same person and is a few years younger. As Bucky, Davis works alongside Naslund and both join the post-WW II superhero team called the All-Winners Squad.

When Naslund is killed in 1946, the Captain America identity passes to Jeffrey Mace, whom Davis met when he first impersonated Bucky. Davis continues to assist Mace as Bucky, fighting criminals and spies. In 1948, Davis is shot while on duty as Bucky and seriously wounded. Now having a permanent limp, Davis retires the Bucky identity.

In 1951, Davis joins the secret V-Battalion, a private organization that hunts war criminals. He eventually became one of its leaders. Decades later, he is killed by a Russian sleeper agent who wants to send a message to the original Bucky Barnes, now known to still be alive.

=== Powers and abilities ===
As Bucky, Davis was trained in hand-to-hand combat and acrobatics. He also had skill as a baseball player.

== Jack Monroe ==
Though this character was depicted as Bucky Barnes in the 1953-1955 Captain America run, these stories as originally presented were rendered non-canonical in 1964 by The Avengers issue #4. A 1972 retcon designed to reintegrate these stories into Earth-616 canon established him as a separate character.

In 1953, an orphan named Jack Monroe, who idolized Captain America and Bucky, discovered that his history teacher also had a similar passion, to the extent of undergoing plastic surgery to make him look like Steve Rogers and assuming his name as well. In addition, "Rogers" had discovered, in some old Nazi files stored in a warehouse in Germany, the lost formula for the Super-Soldier serum that had given Captain America his abilities. The two used the serum and began to fight Communists as Captain America and Bucky. Unfortunately, "Rogers" and Monroe were unaware of the stabilizing "Vita-Ray" process used on the original Captain America. As a result, despite their bodies being enhanced to peak human efficiency, they slowly grew paranoid and dangerously insane. By the middle of 1954 they were irrationally attacking anyone they perceived to be a Communist, at points resulting in them committing racist violence against Hispanics and African-Americans. In 1955 the Federal Bureau of Investigation managed to hunt them down and placed them in suspended animation. The 1950s Captain America and Bucky would be revived years later after the return of Steve Rogers, going on another rampage, and would be defeated by the man they had modeled themselves after. Monroe was eventually cured of his insanity and took up the superhero identity of Nomad, an identity the original Steve Rogers himself had once taken in the 1970s, and teamed up with the original Captain America on a number of occasions. At one point during his solo career, Monroe was injured severely enough to need to be placed in stasis once again. He was revived and brainwashed by Henry Peter Gyrich (who was in turn being manipulated by Baron Strucker). Monroe was then forced to become the new Scourge of the Underworld and sent to kill the Thunderbolts. Monroe eventually broke free of the conditioning, helped the Thunderbolts to defeat Gyrich, and then disappeared. Monroe was last seen reassuming his original Nomad costume. At this time, he had checked in on his former ward he called Bucky, who had since been adopted. Monroe was starting to have delusions again, and started hallucinating; his sanity was again destabilizing, as it had when he first became Bucky. In the same story, Jack Monroe was shot by the Winter Soldier (James Buchanan Barnes, the original Bucky) and dumped in the trunk of a car.

=== Powers and abilities ===
Monroe had augmented strength and reflexes superior to that of any Olympic athlete. Monroe has extensive experience in hand-to-hand combat, having received personal tutoring by Captain America. He is also an expert marksman.

== Rick Jones ==
Soon after awakening in the modern age, Steve Rogers met Rick Jones. Jones donned the Bucky costume in an attempt to make himself Captain America's partner. However, Rogers was still wracked with guilt over the original Bucky's death, and refused to make this a permanent arrangement. While Jones' time in this identity is short lived and the task of measuring up to the original Bucky was daunting, he profited from it with invaluable training from Rogers.

=== Powers and abilities ===
During his position as Bucky, Jones received training in combat gymnastics along with hand-to-hand combat by Captain America.

== Lemar Hoskins ==
As the Super-Patriot, John Walker teamed up with a group known as the Bold Urban Commandos (BUCkies) as a backup team who were sometimes used in staged attacks on the Super-Patriot during his public demonstrations. Walker's main partner was African-American Lemar Hoskins who was allowed to continue to serve as Walker's partner when Walker became Captain America, while the other Buckies, disgruntled after being left out by the Commission on Superhuman Activities, became Left-Winger and Right-Winger. Hoskins used the name and costume of Bucky until he realized the racist connotations of the alias when applied to him (prior to the American Civil War, a male slave was often referred to as a "buck"). He then assumed the name "Battlestar".

=== Powers and abilities ===
Hoskins had superhuman strength, endurance, durability and resilience as a result of the experimental mutagenic process conducted on him by Karl Malus on behalf of the Power Broker. His agility and reflexes are of the order of a superior Olympic athlete. Hoskins is also highly trained in gymnastics and acrobatics. He is an exceptional hand-to-hand combatant, and received rigorous training in unarmed combat from the Commission on Superhuman Activities.

== Rikki Barnes ==
Rikki Barnes was from an alternate Earth created by Franklin Richards in the wake of the Onslaught incident. The granddaughter of Bucky Barnes, Rikki is a member of the Young Allies on Counter-Earth. In the wake of the Onslaught Reborn series, another version of this character (from an alternate Heroes Reborn universe where the Avengers and Fantastic Four never left) has been transported to the mainstream Earth. She sought to make contact with the new Captain America (Bucky Barnes) by contacting Patriot, befriending the Patriot in the process. In a new miniseries she assumed the Nomad identity.

=== Powers and abilities ===
Rikki is a natural athlete who was trained by S.H.I.E.L.D. and Captain America. She is a gifted fighter, marksman and acrobat with the familiarity with technological devices of a S.H.I.E.L.D. agent. As Bucky she wore a bulletproof costume modeled after the original Bucky. She also made use of a vibranium-photonic energy shield along with vibranium soled boots that allowed her to run up walls, move silently, leap greater distances and land from great heights. She also wielded a pistol.

== Julia Winters ==
Other persons who have used the Bucky alias include a baby that Nomad looked after for a period (after which she was adopted and given the name Julia Winters).

== Other versions ==
In the DC Comics/Marvel Comics one-shot intercompany crossover Batman/Captain America (Dec. 1996), written and drawn by John Byrne and set during World War II, Bucky briefly takes Dick Grayson's place as Batman's sidekick, while Robin becomes Captain America's sidekick. In this alternate reality (set in one of DC Comics' numerous "Elseworlds" continuities), Bucky dies (off-page) as he had done in numerous Avengers and Captain America recollections.

In the alternate reality of the five-issue Bullet Points miniseries (Jan.-May 2005), Bucky Barnes never teams up with Steve Rogers as the Super-Soldier program was never activated. However, Rogers volunteers for the 'Iron Man' program and as such, saves Barnes and several fellow soldiers from an advancing tank during the battle of Guadalcanal. Unfortunately he is not swift enough to save Barnes from severe damage to his legs.

In the alternate timeline of the 2005 "House of M" storyline, Bucky Barnes is one of the United States government agents (alongside Mimic and Nuke) sent to Genosha to kill Magneto and as many of his followers as possible. Nuke and Mimic served as a distraction while Agent Barnes sneaked into Magneto's headquarters; and though he fatally stabs Professor Xavier, Bucky was killed by Magneto.

In the second issue of the crossover miniseries Marvel Zombies vs. The Army of Darkness, a zombified Winter Soldier appears and attempts to devour Dazzler before Ash Williams kills him.

The alternate reality Ultimate Marvel version of Bucky Barnes is an adult sidekick of Captain America (Steve Rogers). This version is Steve Rogers' childhood friend who accompanies on missions as an Army press photographer. Surviving the war and believing Captain America's death, Bucky eventually marries Gail Richards and has a large extended family. During which, Bucky is diagnosed as having lung cancer from chain smoking back in the War. Barnes and Gail both live to see Steve's revival in the 21st century and renews their friendship. After America was taken by the Liberators, Bucky is captured at a cemetery with Steve and remains unseen. However, both he and Gail are seen being taken into S.H.I.E.L.D. protective custody after it is discovered that the Red Skull is Steve's and Gail's illegitimate son.

In the alternate reality Marvel MAX series U.S. War Machine, Bucky was serving in the present as Captain America, as the Captain had died in his stead in World War II. Bucky was accompanied here by two assistants, Hawkeye and Falcon, neither wearing a costume and both addressed by their real names.

In the 2005 What If? event, the Captain America story, set during the American Civil War, featured Steve Rogers' commanding officer, Colonel Buck Barnes, whom the men called "Bucky". His mercenary tendencies led to Rogers' desertion, and when he later intervened in Rogers' transformation into Captain America, his face was destroyed, turning him into an undead being known as the White Skull.

In Ruins, which is set in a dystopian alternate future, Bucky is taken into custody alongside Victor Creed and others for several heinous crimes, including cannibalism.

An alternate-universe Bucky appears in the 2011 miniseries Captain America Corps.

A new Bucky named Steve Wilson-Bradley appears in an alternate timeline seen in Avengers: The Children's Crusade. This Bucky is the son of Elijah Bradley and Samantha Wilson (the daughter of the Falcon).

In a world where all the Marvel characters are small children depicted in A-Babies vs. X-Babies, Bucky is Steve's teddy bear, named Bucky Bear. He is stolen by Scott Summers, igniting an enormous battle between the baby Avengers and the baby X-Men.

The teenaged Bucky appears as a member of the Battleworld Runaways during the 2015 "Secret Wars" storyline.
