= Onslaught (Marvel Comics) =

Character from Marvel Comics

- Onslaught as depicted in X-Men: Road to Onslaught#1 (October 1996). Art by Andy Kubert.

Publication information
- Publisher: Marvel Comics
- First appearance: X-Men vol. 2 #53 (May 1996)
- Created by: Scott Lobdell; Mark Waid; Andy Kubert

In-story information
- Full name: None
- Species: Psionic entity mutant
- Team affiliations: Dark Descendants
- Notable aliases: Charles Xavier; Patchwork Man; Dark Xavier; Death; The Entity; Magneto "That Which Shall Survive"
- Abilities: See list: Psychic omnipotence; Powerful psychic abilities, including ESP, telepathy, telekinesis, astral projection, and mental-manipulation; Magnetism manipulation; Defying gravity with magnetism (flight); Matter and energy manipulation; Energy projection; Psychometry; Superhuman strength; Size manipulation; Mutant absorption; Helmet shields against telepathic attacks; Reality manipulation

Onslaught is a character appearing in American comic books published by Marvel Comics. Created by writers Scott Lobdell and Mark Waid, and artist Andy Kubert, he first appeared in 1996 as a cameo in X-Men: Prime #1 before making his first full appearance in X-Men vol. 2, #53, where he would eventually serve as the main antagonist of the "Onslaught" storyline from then onward.

Onslaught was written as a sentient psionic entity created from the subconsciousness of Professor Charles Xavier and Magneto. During a battle between the X-Men and Magneto's Acolytes, Xavier used his telepathic powers to shut down Magneto's mind, rendering him catatonic. It was explained through the Onslaught crossover series that the darkest aspect of Magneto's mind escaped into Xavier's subconscious, where it "merged" with Xavier's own darker nature to eventually grow into a separate persona of its own.

== Publication history ==
Onslaught was created by writers Scott Lobdell, Mark Waid, and artist Andy Kubert. The character first appeared in cameo in X-Men: Prime #1 (July 1995), named in Uncanny X-Men #322 and made his first full appearance in X-Men vol. 2, #53 (June 1996). He was written and introduced as a villain that was part of the effect of events in the 1993 "Fatal Attractions" storyline. The "Onslaught" storyline was a crossover event with tie-ins among other Marvel books, including Avengers, Fantastic Four and The Amazing Spider-Man.

== Fictional character biography ==
=== Origins ===
Onslaught is a psionic entity created from the subconsciousness of Professor Charles Xavier and Magneto. During a battle between the X-Men and Magneto's Acolytes, Magneto used his powers to remove the adamantium from Wolverine's skeleton. Xavier used his telepathy to shut down Magneto's mind and render him catatonic. As Xavier and Magneto's minds were connected, their negative emotions combine and form into Onslaught.

After gaining an independent body, Onslaught possesses Xavier and kidnaps him after being forced to leave his body. Onslaught also captures Nate Grey, intending to use his power to transform the human race into a collective consciousness. Several members of the Avengers and Fantastic Four sacrifice themselves to stop Onslaught by entering his energy field, causing him to be destroyed. It is later revealed that the heroes survived, but were transported to a pocket universe created by Franklin Richards and rendered amnesiac. The Avengers and the Fantastic Four return to their home universe, possessing only vague memories of their time in the other universe.

=== Onslaught Reborn ===
A five-issue limited series, Onslaught Reborn, was released in 2006 to celebrate the tenth anniversary of the "Onslaught" storyline; it is written by Jeph Loeb, with art by Rob Liefeld.

After Scarlet Witch removes the powers of most of Earth's mutants, the powers of Charles Xavier and Magneto combine to reform Onslaught, whose consciousness survived after his death. Onslaught swears revenge on Franklin Richards and other heroes, transforming into a monstrous form with a skull-like face. However, he is defeated by Rikki Barnes, who transports herself and Onslaught to the Negative Zone.

=== Onslaught Unleashed ===
Some time later, Rikki Barnes, now known as Nomad, begins having nightmares set in the jungles of South America. When her teammate Toro is kidnapped, Rikki begins to suspect that her nightmares are something more sinister than she first thought. Later, while investigating Roxxon, the Secret Avengers come across the plans Project Power, a deadly power source developed in Colombia. As the Secret Avengers investigate the facility, Beast and Ant-Man find the source of the energy to be from the Negative Zone. As Rikki races inside the facility to locate Toro, she stumbles into the control room instead.

Onslaught possesses Rikki and reveals that she is a construct created to act as his host, with the real Rikki having died in the Negative Zone. Rikki has Gravity kill her so that Onslaught cannot return.

=== Red Onslaught ===
A clone of Red Skull exhumes Charles Xavier's corpse and grafts part of his brain onto his own. He gains Xavier's psychic abilities and becomes known as Red Onslaught. Red Onslaught is defeated by Scarlet Witch and Doctor Doom, who attempt to use their magic to invert his morals. Their efforts backfire, causing everyone present to morally invert from their usual behavior. With the Skull reverted to a human body, he is hidden from the Avengers by Edwin Jarvis until Steve Rogers can retrieve him. Working with the inverted villains — now referring to themselves as the 'Astonishing Avengers' — and with Brother Voodoo possessing Scarlet Witch, the White Skull is able to undo the inversion.

=== Reign of X ===
Following the establishment of Krakoa as a mutant nation, Nightcrawler becomes aware that a dark presence is haunting Krakoa, which is dubbed "Patchwork Man". Believing the culprit to be his son Legion, Xavier recruits Nightcrawler to investigate and bring Legion to Krakoa. Nightcrawler rescues Legion from Orchis and learns that the Patchwork Man is Onslaught, who was restored and weaponized by Orchis. Nightcrawler and Legion embrace Onslaught instead of fighting him, weakening Onslaught and enabling Nightcrawler to kill him.

== Powers and abilities ==
Onslaught is a psionic entity with superior physical and mental power; possessing the combined abilities of Professor X and Magneto. He is capable of telepathy, telekinesis, energy projection, sensing mutant presences, manipulating magnetic fields, mind control, flight, mental manipulation, possession, astral projection, perceiving magnetic and electrical energy, absorbing any mutant into his being, and affecting reality itself. Onslaught can also enhance his physical size and strength.

After fully evolving into his own, separate consciousness and having Professor X ripped from him in the Astral Plane, Onslaught evolved into a second, cybernetic form. In this form, thanks to adding the full potential of Franklin Richards and Nate Grey combined, his powers were increased to god-like levels, including the ability to create and reshape matter at will, and apparent omnipotence.

== Other versions ==
=== Chrono Signature Anno Doom +128 ===
An alternate future version of Onslaught appears in the series Superior Avengers. This version is a member of the eponymous group who is alleged to have been born from the collective negative emotions of mutants following the disastrous second Krakoan Age. Doctor Doom kills Onslaught after removing his helmet, which exposes him to endless thoughts.

=== Jean Grey's Onslaught ===
An alternate universe version of Onslaught appears in the series Weapon X-Men. This version was created by Magneto and Jean Grey, who began using more decisive methods to bring peace between mutants and humankind after the death of Professor X. Onslaught is ultimately convinced to stand down and leaves to travel the multiverse with the Phoenix Force.

== In other media ==
- Onslaught appears as a boss and playable character in Marvel vs. Capcom: Clash of Super Heroes, voiced by Maurice Dean Wint.
- Onslaught appears in Marvel Super Hero Squad Online, voiced by Travis Willingham.
- Red Onslaught appears as a boss in Marvel Heroes.
- Onslaught appears as an unlockable playable character in Marvel Puzzle Quest.
- Onslaught appears in Marvel Contest of Champions.
- Onslaught appears as a collectable card in Marvel Snap.
- Onslaught was proposed as the main antagonist of the cancelled X-Men Legends 3.

== Collected editions ==
Title	Material collected	Published date	ISBN
X-Men: Prelude To Onslaught	X-Men #50, Uncanny X-Men #333, X-Man #15-17, Cable #32-33	April 2010	978-0785144632
X-Men: The Road to Onslaught Vol. 1	X-Men Prime #1, Uncanny X-Men #322-326, X-Men #42-45, Annual '95, X-Men Unlimited #8	February 2014	978-0785188254
X-Men: The Road to Onslaught Vol. 2	X-Men/Clandestine #1-2, Uncanny X-Men #327-328, Annual '95, X-Men #46-49, X-Men Unlimited #9; Sabretooth #1	July 2014	978-0785188308
X-Men: The Road to Onslaught Vol. 3	Uncanny X-Men #329-332, Archangel #1, X-Men/Brood #1-2, X-Men Unlimited #10, X-Men #50-52, Wolverine #101, Xavier Institute Alumni Yearbook	January 2015	978-0785190059
X-Men: The Complete Onslaught Epic Book 1	X-Men #53-54, Uncanny X-Men #334-335, Avengers #400-401, Onslaught: X-Men, X-Man #18, X-Force #57, Cable #34, Incredible Hulk #444	January 2008	978-0785128236
X-Men: The Complete Onslaught Epic Book 2	Excalibur #100, Wolverine #104, X-Factor #125-126, Sensational Spider-Man #8, Amazing Spider-Man #415, Green Goblin #12, Spider-Man #72, X-Man #18, X-Force #57, Punisher #11	June 2008	978-0785128243
X-Men: The Complete Onslaught Epic Book 3	Incredible Hulk #445, Iron Man #332, Avengers #402, Punisher #11, X-Man #19, Amazing Spider-Man #415, Green Goblin #12, Spider-Man #72, Fantastic Four #416, Wolverine #105	September 2008	978-0785128250
X-Men: The Complete Onslaught Epic Book 4	Fantastic Four #416, X-Men #56-57, Onslaught: Marvel Universe, Cable #36, Uncanny X-Men #337, Onslaught Epilogue, X-Men: The Road to Onslaught	January 2009	978-0785128267
X-Men/Avengers: Onslaught Vol. 1	Cable #32-33, Uncanny X-Men #333-335, X-Force #55, X-Man #15-17, X-Men #53-54, X-Men Unlimited #11, Onslaught: X-Men #1, Avengers #401, Fantastic Four #415	March 2020	978-1302922818
X-Men/Avengers: Onslaught Vol. 2	Cable #34-35, Incredible Hulk #444-445, Wolverine #104, X-Factor #125-126, Amazing Spider-Man #415, Green Goblin #12, Spider-Man #72, X-Man #18-19, X-Force #57-58, X-Men #55, Uncanny X-Men #336, Iron Man #332	October 2020	978-1302923990
X-Men/Avengers: Onslaught Vol. 3	Avengers #402, Punisher #11, Thor #502, Wolverine #105, X-Men #56-57, Annual '96, Onslaught: Marvel Universe, Onslaught: Epilogue, Cable #36, Uncanny X-Men #337, X-Men: The Road to Onslaught #1 and material from Fantastic Four #416	May 2021	978-1302922986
X-Men: Onslaught Aftermath	Uncanny X-Men #338-340, Annual '96-97, X-Men #58-61, Annual '97, X-Men Unlimited #12-14, X-Factor #130	April 2019	978-1302916510
Cable & X-Force: Onslaught Rising	X-Force #49-56, Cable #29-31, X-Man #14, X-Force/Cable Annual '95	June 2018	978-1302909499
Cable & X-Force: Onslaught!	Cable #32-39, X-Force #57-61, Incredible Hulk #444, X-Man #18-19, X-Force/Cable Annual '96	March 2019	978-1302916190
X-Men/Avengers: Onslaught Omnibus	Cable #32-36, Uncanny X-Men #333-337, X-Force #55, 57-58, X-Man #15-19, X-Men #53-57, X-Men Annual '96, X-Men Unlimited #11, Onslaught: X-Men, Onslaught: Marvel Universe, Onslaught: Epilogue, Avengers #401-402, Fantastic Four #415, Incredible Hulk #444-445, Wolverine #104-105, X-Factor #125-126, Amazing Spider-Man #415, Green Goblin #12, Spider-Man #72, Iron Man #332, Punisher #11, Thor #502, X-Men: Road to Onslaught #1 and material from Excalibur #100, Fantastic Four #416	March 2022	978-1302931612
X-Men Milestones: Onslaught	Uncanny X-Men #333-337, X-Men #53-57, Onslaught: X-Men, Onslaught: Marvel Universe, Onslaught: Epilogue, Avengers #401, Fantastic Four #415, Wolverine #104, Cable #35	January 2020	978-1302921927
Onslaught Reborn	Onslaught Reborn #1-5	March 2008	978-0785131342
Onslaught Unleashed	Onslaught Unleashed #1-4	August 2011	978-0785157762
Heroes Reborn: The Return Omnibus	Onslaught Reborn #1-5, Onslaught Unleashed #1-4, Marvel Spotlight: Heroes Reborn/Onslaught Reborn and Heroes Reborn: Doomsday, Heroes Reborn: Doom, Doom #1-3, Doom: The Emperor Returns #1-3, Heroes Reborn: The Return #1-4, Thor Annual 1999, Heroes Reborn: Ashema, Masters of Evil, Rebel, Remnants, Young Allies, Fantastic Four (vol. 2) #25, 31, Thunderbolts #51-52, 60-62, 64, 66, 68, 70, 72, 74, Exiles #81-82	September 2020	978-1302925178
Way Of X	X-Men: The Onslaught Revelation #1 and Way of X #1-5	February 2022	978-1302928070

== Reception ==
Onslaught has been noted as an underwhelming villain.
