= Captain America (comic book) =

Comic book titles featuring the character Captain America

- Captain America #100 (April 1968); Cover art by Jack Kirby

Publication information
- Publisher: Marvel Comics
- Schedule: Varied
- Format: Ongoing series
- Genre: Superhero
- Publication date: Full list
- No. of issues: Full list
- Main character: Captain America

Captain America is a comic book title featuring the character Captain America and published by Marvel Comics. The original Captain America comic book series debuted in 1968.

== Publication history ==
Atlas Comics published the short-lived title Captain America #76–78 from May 1954 to September 1954. Atlas came to adopt the name Marvel Comics in 1961. During the Marvel era, Captain America was starring in the title Tales of Suspense, which was retitled Captain America with issue #100 (April 1968). The new title Captain America continued to feature artwork by Jack Kirby, as well as a short run by Jim Steranko, and work by many of the industry's top artists and writers. It was called Captain America and the Falcon from #134 (Feb. 1971) to #222 (June 1978), although the Falcon's name was not on the cover for issues #193, 200, and 216. The 1972–1975 run on the title by writer Steve Englehart and artist Sal Buscema saw the series become one of Marvel's top-sellers. In 2010, Comics Bulletin ranked Englehart and Buscema's run on Captain America fourth on its list of the "Top 10 1970s Marvels". Kirby returned to the series as writer and penciler with issue #193 (Jan. 1975) and remained through #214 (Oct. 1977).

This series – considered Captain America volume one by comics researchers and historians – ended with #454 (Aug. 1996). Captain America Vol. 1 should not be confused with the 1940s series Captain America Comics (1941–1949, 1954) and Captain America's Weird Tales (1949–1950).

This series was almost immediately followed by the 13-issue Captain America vol. 2 (Nov. 1996 – Nov. 1997, part of the "Heroes Reborn" crossover), the 50-issue Captain America vol. 3 (Jan. 1998 – Feb. 2002), the 32-issue Captain America vol. 4 (June 2002 – Dec. 2004), and Captain America vol. 5 (Jan. 2005 – Aug. 2011). Beginning with the 600th overall issue (Aug. 2009), Captain America resumed its original numbering, as if the series numbering had continued uninterrupted after #454.

As part of the aftermath of Marvel Comics' company-crossover storyline "Civil War", Steve Rogers was ostensibly killed in Captain America vol. 5, #25 (March 2007). Series writer Ed Brubaker remarked, "What I found is that all the really hard-core left-wing fans want Cap to be standing out on and giving speeches on the street corner against the George W. Bush administration, and all the really right-wing fans all want him to be over in the streets of Baghdad, punching out Saddam Hussein." The character's co-creator, Joe Simon, said, "It's a hell of a time for him to go. We really need him now." Artist Alex Ross designed a slightly revised Captain America costume that former sidekick Bucky Barnes began to wear as the new Captain America in vol. 5, #34 (March 2008). As of 2007, an estimated 210 million copies of "Captain America" comic books had been sold in 75 countries.

The storyline of Rogers' return began in issue #600.

Marvel stated in May 2011 that Rogers, following the public death of Bucky Barnes in the "Fear Itself" crossover, would resume his Captain America identity in a sixth volume of Captain America, by writer Ed Brubaker and artist Steve McNiven. The Captain America title continued from issue #620 featuring team up stories with Bucky (#620-#628), Hawkeye (#629-#632), Iron Man (#633–635), Namor (#635.1), and Black Widow (#636-#640), and the title ended its print run with issue #640.

In February 2025, it was announced that Chip Zdarsky would be writing a new volume of Captain America for Marvel. The opening arc of the series will follow Steve shortly after he is freed from the ice and tells the untold first encounter between him and Doctor Doom. Valerio Schiti will serve as the main artist for the book, with the first issue set to debut in July 2025.

== See also ==
- 1968 in comics
- List of Captain America titles
- Silver Age of Comic Books
