= Vision (Timely Comics) =

Marvel comic book character that first appeared in Marvel Mystery Comics #13

- Interior artwork from All-New Invaders vol. 1, 2 (April, 2014 Marvel Comics); Art by Steve Pugh

Publication information
- Publisher: Marvel Comics
- First appearance: Marvel Mystery Comics #13 (November 1940)
- Created by: Joe Simon (writer); Jack Kirby (artist)

In-story information
- Alter ego: Aarkus
- Team affiliations: Battle-Axis; Invaders; Avengers
- Abilities: Flight; Cold and ice generation; Teleportation via smoke; Ability to generate illusory images; Smoke/Vapor/Gas Control; Immunity to Ingestion; Superhuman Strength; Superhuman Agility; Superhuman Speed; Superhuman Durability; Telepathic Immunity; Image Projection; Mind Control; Immortality; Shape Alteration; Astral/Mental Form; Hypnotism; Martial Artist

Vision (Aarkus) is a superhero appearing in American comic books published by Marvel Comics. Created by the writer Joe Simon and artist Jack Kirby, the character first appeared during the Golden Age of comic books in Marvel Mystery Comics #13 (Nov. 1940), published by Marvel predecessor Timely Comics.

== Publication history ==
The Vision (Aarkus) debuts in Marvel Mystery Comics #13 (Nov. 1940). Art by Jack Kirby.

The Vision debuted in a short comic story in Marvel Mystery Comics #13 (Nov. 1940), and continued as a regular feature in that superhero anthology through issue #48 (Oct. 1943). He also starred in an eight-page story in Kid Komics #3 (no month given; previous issue dated Summer 1943).

Five decades later, he appeared in a flashback story in the superhero-team series The Invaders vol. 2, #3 (July 1993), set during World War II. He returns with the other Invaders in the miniseries Invaders Now!, beginning with issue #1 (Nov. 2010). Earlier, Vision had appeared as a character brought to life by Rick Jones’ imagination, near the end of the Kree-Skrull War in Avengers #96-97 (1972). He appeared in several issues of the Marvel NOW! relaunch of X-Men: Legacy, before appearing in the All-New Invaders series in 2014.

== Fictional character biography ==
The Golden Age Vision, also known as Aarkus, is an alien law enforcement officer from a dimension called Smokeworld. While Aarkus is looking for a suitable place to exile a prisoner, he is accidentally contacted by Earth scientist Markham Erickson. Leaving the prisoner on the planet Jupiter, Aarkus accepts Erickson's invitation to fight crime on Earth. Aarkus does so for several years, although during World War II he is briefly manipulated by the Axis powers into fighting the Allies. The superhero team the Invaders help Aarkus realize his mistake.

In The Avengers #97 (March 1972), Rick Jones summons Vision, among other Golden Age heroes, to assist the Avengers during the Kree–Skrull War.

"Avengers/Invaders" #8 (February 2008) presents the character as inhabiting the sewers under New York, taking care of a Cosmic Cube that is feeding off the feelings of people affected by the death of Captain America. Following a period in which he traveled through time, he is seen with the newly resurrected Toro. He plays a supporting role in 2012's X-Men: Legacy, first opposing and later aiding main character Legion. During the story, he falls into a coma and is confined to the medical wing of the Jean Grey School for Higher Learning.

After waking from his coma, Aarkus is approached by the Winter Soldier for help in getting the surviving members of the Invaders to the Kree home world to rescue Namor. The story presents events from World War II, portraying Aarkus as erasing the memories of the Invaders (with their consent) to hide the location of an ancient Kree weapon called the God's Whisper, that had granted Baron von Strucker the power to control gods. The Invaders then attack Kree to free Namor and recover the weapon. A later story presents Aarkus as working with the Eternals on using the God's Whisper to manipulate Galactus.

== Powers and abilities ==
The Vision can generate illusory images of himself, fly, generate ice and extreme cold, and teleport wherever there is smoke.

== Vision reprints ==
Some of the original stories of the original Vision have been reprinted in other publications.

- Golden Age Marvel Comics Vol. 4, Roy Thomas editor, (2009, hardcover, ISBN 978-0785124740) reprints Marvel Mystery Comics' #13-16, 1940–41
- Golden Age Marvel Comics Vol. 5, Roy Thomas editor, (2010, hardcover, ISBN 978-0785133674) reprints Marvel Mystery Comics' #17-20, 1941
- Golden Age Marvel Comics Vol. 6, Roy Thomas editor, (2011, hardcover, ISBN 978-0785142041) reprints Marvel Mystery Comics' #21-24, 1941
- Golden Age Marvel Comics Vol. 7, Roy Thomas editor, (2012, hardcover, ISBN 978-0785150268) reprints Marvel Mystery Comics' #25-28, 1941–42
- Marvel Visionaries: Jack Kirby Vol. 1 (2004, hardcover, ISBN 0-7851-1574-9) reprints "The Vision" from Marvel Mystery Comics 13, Nov 1940
- Marvel Visionaries: Jack Kirby Vol. 2 (2006, hardcover, ISBN 0-7851-2094-7) reprints "The Vision" from Marvel Mystery Comics 23, Sept 1941
- The comic Marvel Super-Heroes, March 1968, reprints the Vision story from Marvel Mystery Comics 25

== In other media ==
Vision appears as a playable character in Marvel Contest of Champions.
