= Captain America Comics =

Comic book series (1941–1949, 1954)

- Captain America Comics #1 (March 1941). Cover art by Joe Simon (inks and pencils) and Jack Kirby (pencils).

Publication information
- Publisher: Timely Comics; Atlas Comics
- Schedule: Varied
- Format: Ongoing series
- Publication date: Full list
- No. of issues: Full list
- Main character: Captain America

Captain America Comics is a comic book series featuring the superhero character Captain America. The series was originally published by Timely Comics from 1941 to 1950, with a brief revival by Atlas Comics in 1954.

== Publication history ==
=== Creation ===
In 1940, writer Joe Simon conceived the idea for Captain America and made a sketch of the character in costume. "I wrote the name 'Super American' at the bottom of the page," Simon said in his autobiography, and then decided:

No, it didn't work. There were too many "Supers" around. "Captain America" had a good sound to it. There weren't a lot of captains in comics. It was as easy as that. The boy companion was simply named Bucky, after my friend Bucky Pierson, a star on our high school basketball team.

Simon recalled in his autobiography that Timely Comics publisher Martin Goodman gave him the go-ahead and directed that a Captain America solo comic book series be published as soon as possible. Needing to fill a full comic with primarily one character's stories, Simon did not believe that his regular creative partner, artist Jack Kirby, could handle the workload alone:

I didn't have a lot of objections to putting a crew on the first issue ... There were two young artists from Connecticut that had made a strong impression on me. Al Avison and Al Gabriele often worked together and were quite successful in adapting their individual styles to each other. Actually, their work was not too far from [that of] Kirby's. If they worked on it, and if one inker tied the three styles together, I believed the final product would emerge as quite uniform. The two Als were eager to join in on the new Captain America book, but Jack Kirby was visibly upset. "You're still number one, Jack," I assured him. "It's just a matter of a quick deadline for the first issue." "I'll make the deadline," Jack promised. "I'll pencil it [all] myself and make the deadline." I hadn't expected this kind of reaction ... but I acceded to Kirby's wishes and, it turned out, was lucky that I did. There might have been two Als, but there was only one Jack Kirby ... I wrote the first Captain America book with penciled lettering right on the drawing boards, with very rough sketches for figures and backgrounds. Kirby did his thing, building the muscular anatomy, adding ideas and popping up the action as only he could. Then he tightened up the penciled drawings, adding detailed backgrounds, faces and figures."

Al Liederman would ink that first issue, which was lettered by Simon and Kirby's regular letterer, Howard Ferguson.

Simon said Captain America was a consciously political creation; he and Kirby were morally repulsed by the actions of Nazi Germany in the years leading up to the United States' involvement in World War II and felt war was inevitable: "The opponents to the war were all quite well organized. We wanted to have our say too." It has been observed that the Captain America character has numerous elements of Jewish iconography as a variant of the idea of the Golem, an automaton who protects the Jewish community who was created by an elder of that community, Dr. Irkstine.

=== Golden Age ===
Captain America Comics #1 – cover-dated March 1941 and on sale December 20, 1940, a year before the attack on Pearl Harbor, but a full year into World War II – showed the protagonist punching Nazi leader Adolf Hitler; it sold nearly one million copies. While most readers responded favorably to the comic, some took objection. Simon noted, "When the first issue came out we got a lot of ... threatening letters and hate mail. Some people really opposed what Cap stood for." The threats, which included menacing groups of people loitering out on the street outside of the offices, proved so serious that police protection was posted, with New York Mayor Fiorello La Guardia personally contacting Simon and Kirby to give his support.

Though preceded as a "patriotically themed superhero" by MLJ's The Shield, Captain America immediately became the most prominent and enduring of the wave of superheroes introduced in American comic books prior to and during World War II, as evinced by the unusual move at the time of premiering the character in his own title instead of an anthology title first. This popularity drew the attention and a complaint from MLJ that the character's triangular shield too closely resembled the chest symbol of their Shield character. In response, Goodman had Simon and Kirby create a distinctive round shield for issue 2, which went on to become an iconic element of the character. With his sidekick Bucky, Captain America faced villains from Nazi Germany, Empire of Japan, and other threats to wartime America and the Allies. Stanley Lieber, now better known as Stan Lee, in his first professional fiction writing task, contributed to the character in issue #3 in the filler text story "Captain America Foils the Traitor's Revenge", which introduced the character's use of his shield as a returning throwing weapon. Captain America soon became Timely's most popular character and even had a fan-club called the "Sentinels of Liberty".

Circulation figures remained close to a million copies per month after the debut issue, which outstripped even the circulation of news magazines such as Time during the period. The character was widely imitated by other comics publishers, with around 40 red-white-and-blue patriotic heroes debuting in 1941 alone. After the Simon and Kirby team moved to DC Comics in late 1941, having produced Captain America Comics through issue #10 (January 1942), Al Avison and Syd Shores became regular pencillers of the celebrated title, with one generally inking over the other. The character was featured in All Winners Comics #1–19 (Summer 1941 – Fall 1946), Marvel Mystery Comics #80–84 and #86–92, USA Comics #6–17 (December 1942 – Fall 1945), and All Select Comics #1–10 (Fall 1943 – Summer 1946).

In the post-war era, with the popularity of superheroes fading, Captain America led Timely's first superhero team, the All-Winners Squad, in its two published adventures, in All Winners Comics #19 and #21 (Fall–Winter 1946; there was no issue #20). After Bucky was shot and wounded in a 1948 Captain America story, he was succeeded by Captain America's girlfriend, Betsy Ross, who became the superheroine Golden Girl. Captain America Comics ran until issue #73 (July 1949), at which time the series was retitled Captain America's Weird Tales for two issues (October 1949 – February 1950), with the finale being a horror/suspense anthology issue with no superheroes.

Atlas Comics attempted to revive its superhero titles when it reintroduced Captain America, along with the original Human Torch and the Sub-Mariner, in Young Men #24 (December 1953). Billed as "Captain America, Commie Smasher!" Captain America appeared during the next year in Young Men #24–28 and Men's Adventures #27–28, as well as in issues #76–78 of an eponymous title (May–September 1954). Atlas' attempted superhero revival was a commercial failure, and the character's title was canceled with Captain America #78 (September 1954).

A copy of Captain America Comics #1 comic book was sold for $3.12 million at Heritage Auctions in 2022.

== See also ==
- List of Captain America titles
