= Toro (character) =

- Patrick Berkenkotter's interior artwork from The Torch #1 (November 2009)

Publication information
- Publisher: Marvel Comics
- First appearance: Human Torch Comics #2 (Fall 1940)
- Created by: Carl Burgos (writer and artist)

In-story information
- Alter ego: Thomas Raymond
- Species: Inhuman
- Team affiliations: The Invaders; Kid Commandos; Young Allies; All-Winners Squad; Legion of the Unliving
- Partnerships: Human Torch
- Notable aliases: The Flaming Kid, Human Torch
- Abilities: Fire manipulation and resistance Flight

Toro is the name of two fictional characters appearing in American comic books published by Marvel Comics. The first Toro was originally featured in Timely Comics and later published as a Marvel Comics superhero who appeared as the partner of the original Human Torch.

== Publication history ==
Toro made his debut in Timely Comics' Human Torch Comics #2 (premiering fall 1940 with no cover date and as issue #2, having taken over the numbering from the single-issue Red Raven). Toro appeared in numerous comics titles in the 1940s, both during World War II and the post-war era. He starred with Bucky in Young Allies Comics, and made appearances in various issues of Kid Comics, Amazing Comics, Complete Comics, Mystic Comics, All-Winners Comics, and Sub-Mariner Comics. In 1948, however, the Human Torch dropped Toro as a sidekick, picking up with Sun Girl instead.

Toro and the Torch later appeared in Atlas' Young Men #24 (December 1953). Toro also made several appearances in Marvel Comics titles, beginning with reprints of Human Torch stories in Marvel Super-Heroes #12–14 (Dec. 1967-May 1968), followed by a previously unpublished Atlas-era Human Torch story in #16 (Sep. 1968).

Toro appeared in a new story in Prince Namor, The Sub-Mariner #14 (June 1969) where he was seemingly killed off. He subsequently appeared in flashbacks and historical stories, being a regular character in the 1970s Invaders series. After years of only appearing in flashback stories, he returned to current publication with the 2008 Avengers/Invaders maxiseries and the 2009 miniseries The Torch.

In 2014, as part of Marvel Now!, the All-New Invaders were relaunched and a flashback story was told about Toro during WWII in issues #6–7 and it is revealed Toro is an Inhuman in issue #10.

== Fictional character biography ==
=== Thomas Raymond ===
Toro makes his first appearance (right) appearing alongside his mentor the original Human Torch. From Human Torch Comics #2

Thomas Raymond was born in New York City to parents who were laboratory assistants to Phineas Horton, creator of the original Human Torch. After their employment with Horton ended, they were killed in a train derailment. Toro was found at the site of the accident by a traveling circus completely unscathed despite the blaze from the wreckage raging around him. He was found to have a natural immunity to fire. Adopted by the circus, his abilities were used to draw attention.

Eventually the circus is visited by the Human Torch, whose presence causes Toro's powers to fully emerge. The Human Torch teaches Toro how to control his flame powers, and from this point onward, Toro becomes a protégé and partner of the Torch. He later becomes a co-founder of the Invaders.

Toro is the only member of the Invaders to survive the war mentally and physically intact. He marries Ann Raymond and assumes a pedestrian life, until he is killed in battle with the Mad Thinker.

Toro appears in the Avengers/Invaders maxi-series alongside his fellow Invaders when an incident transports them to the present day. An examination of him by S.H.I.E.L.D. agents reveals Toro to be a mutant. In Avengers/Invaders #12, Bucky Barnes resurrects Toro using a Cosmic Cube, making sure that he only returns after the Invaders have returned to the past as to not upset the timeline.

Toro is the protagonist of the 2009 miniseries The Torch. Set during the events of "Dark Reign", the series opens shortly after Toro's resurrection. He is deeply unhappy because he is legally dead, his wife has remarried, no one seems to remember him, and the world has progressed rapidly without him. Vision tries to encourage him to seek a heroic path, but agrees to transport him to the Mad Thinker. Toro announces that he plans to kill the Mad Thinker for murdering him, but loses his powers before he can act on this. The Mad Thinker quickly takes him prisoner and vivisects him to learn more about his powers. He discovers that Toro is indeed a mutant, but that there are artificial cells in Toro's nervous system of exactly the same kind that make up the Human Torch. Further investigation reveals that Toro's mother, Nora Raymond, once worked for Phineas Horton, the scientist who created the Golden Age Human Torch. Still wounded, Toro is dragged to his feet to witness the Human Torch's resurrection. His friend is under the complete control of the Mad Thinker, and does not recognize him. Toro's attempt to get through to him seems only to make their captors angry, but the contact serves to reignite Toro's power.

Following the Infinity story, when Terrigen Mist was released worldwide, Toro is subjected to Terrigenesis and engulfed in a cocoon. Being unknowingly an Inhuman descendant, it is now theorized that Toro's powers come from his recessive Inhuman genes.

=== Benito Serrano ===
The Toro of Counter-Earth is named Benito Serrano. He is a member of the Young Allies of Counter-Earth and can transform into a Minotaur-like form.

A version of Serrano from the regular Earth is later introduced. During the "Secret Empire" storyline, Toro appears as a member of the Underground when Hydra takes over the United States.

== Powers and abilities ==
Toro has superhuman abilities which are similar to those of the Human Torch (the ability to fly and burst into flames, as well as flame resistance). These were originally thought to be caused by his parents' exposure to radiation prior to his conception, making Toro a genetic mutant. Investigation by the Mad Thinker reveals that the similarity is because his nervous system has incorporated artificial power cells, which also power the original Human Torch. Reed Richards confirmed that these cells interfered with the natural expression of his mutant powers, causing him to mimic the Human Torch. Many years later, Toro's origins were retroactively changed again, to explain his powers in fact came from recessive Inhuman genes.

Toro's metabolism is enhanced when he activates his flame powers, once recovering from heart surgery within a few minutes, and once healing extensive damage inflicted by the Mad Thinker's experiments to the point that open wounds healed and scarred over in the time it took him to fly from the North Atlantic Ocean to New York City.

The second Toro can transform into a superhuman form with bull-like horns and skin, greater physical mass, superhuman strength and the ability to leap far distances.

== Other versions ==
In the future timeline where the Hulk became the Maestro, Toro gradually loses his powers and becomes the Maestro's First Minister.

== In other media ==
- The Thomas Raymond incarnation of Toro appears in The Super Hero Squad Show episode "World War Witch!", voiced by Tara Strong. This version is a member of the Invaders.
- Benito Serrano appears in Hulk: Where Monsters Dwell, voiced by Michael Robles while his monstrous form's vocal effects are provided by Edward Bosco. This version was transformed into a Minotaur by Nightmare to serve as his anchor to the mortal world. While the Hulk and Doctor Strange help free Serrano, his astral form is compromised, leaving him trapped in his monstrous form. Subsequently, he joins the Howling Commandos while waiting for Strange to find a way to restore him to normal.
