= Heroes Reborn (1996 comic) =

1996 Marvel Comics crossover story arc

- Portion of the front cover of the trade literature Mega Marvel Catalog by Rob Liefeld and Jim Lee that promote the crossover storyarc.
- Publisher: Marvel Comics
- Publication date: 1996–1997
- Genre: Superhero; Crossover
- Main character(s): Avengers; Fantastic Four; Loki; Doctor Doom; Mole Man; Red Skull; Hydra; Hulk; Galactus
- Fantastic Four: Heroes Reborn: ISBN 0-7851-0744-4
- Heroes Reborn: Iron Man: ISBN 0-7851-2338-5
- Heroes Reborn: Captain America: ISBN 0-7851-2339-3

"Heroes Reborn" is a 1996–97 crossover story arc among comic book series published by the American company Marvel Comics. During this one-year, multi-title story arc, Marvel temporarily outsourced the production of several of its best-known comic books to the studios of artists Jim Lee and Rob Liefeld, who had been among Marvel's most popular artists before leaving to form independent companies.

== Publication history ==
"Heroes Reborn" was an attempt by Marvel to address low sales on some of its titles. While Spider-Man and X-Men-related titles sold well, as did some titles under the horror-themed "Midnight Sons" imprint like Ghost Rider, reader interest was comparatively poor on Avengers and Fantastic Four. Marvel conceived of an experiment to outsource production for titles with lagging sales to two former Marvel artists, Jim Lee and Rob Liefeld, who had left the publisher four years earlier to form Image Comics, and who still enjoyed great popularity among the comics-buying public. The two creators would launch four new titles, with Jim Lee's WildStorm Productions producing Fantastic Four and Iron Man, and Rob Liefeld's Extreme Studios handling Captain America and The Avengers. These books would be set in a new continuity. In-story, it would be explained that these characters had been accidentally transported into a "pocket universe" separate from the main Marvel universe by Franklin Richards, during a battle with the supervillain Onslaught.

While the rest of the world believed these characters had died, they in fact were now in a new universe, essentially "reborn", without any memory of their past universe, which allowed Lee and Liefeld to establish new, revised origin stories for modern readers. For example, Ben Grimm fought as a pilot in the Gulf War instead of World War II, with Susan Storm and Johnny Storm being explained to have been financial backers for Reed Richards' rocket, hence their presence on the mission. In addition, while Richards' goal of becoming the first man to get to Mars remained, it was revealed that he secretly aimed to explore the interstellar anomalies of that area.

Marvel ended Liefeld's contract early after six issues, citing low sales on his two titles, which were reassigned to Lee. Walt Simonson took over Avengers when it moved to WildStorm. Although the four titles in "Heroes Reborn" were slated for a 12-issue run, James Robinson wrote a thirteenth and final issue for each book. The storyline, entitled "World War III", was a crossover between the Marvel and WildStorm characters.

At the end of the storyline, which lasted one year, WildStorm's agreement with Marvel ended, at which point the Fantastic Four and Avengers were returned to the mainstream Marvel Universe, again through the intervention of Franklin Richards, in the storyline "Heroes Return", which included a central miniseries Heroes Reborn: The Return, by writer Peter David and artist Salvador Larroca.

== Promotion ==
To promote the Captain America series, Liefeld produced a piece of promo art depicting that character, which became one of the most famous and mocked illustrations from that period of Liefeld's career. The artwork depicted Captain America with "cartoonish proportions", in particular his stomach, arms, and "gaping barrel chest", as Comic Book Resources (CBR) put it. Referred to by Comics Beat as "the most infamous piece of art in comics history,"

Timothy Donohoo of CBR observed that the artwork "showcases the extreme and many times highly unrealistic anatomy seen in the comics of the era", and came to be viewed as emblematic of Liefeld's artwork as a whole. The image went on to become an internet meme, and was included in critical articles such as "The 40 Worst Rob Liefeld Drawings", "A Gallery of Rob Liefeld's Anatomical Abominations" and "Worst Rob Liefeld Covers", earning Liefeld his status as one of the industry's most controversial comics artists.

Liefeld poked fun at the matter in 2016, posting, "Of course I'm #teamcap. I didn't give him those big tits for nuthin..." He revisited the illustration in September 2023, with a New York Comic Con variant cover for Captain America (vol. 10) #1, depicting the Sam Wilson incarnation of the character in the same pose. Posting the image on Twitter, Liefeld commented, "Had to get something off my chest." In October 2023 the original 1996 artwork was put up for auction with Heritage Auctions, the second time it had been made so available. On November 17, the final piece was auctioned for $132,000 USD.

== Reception ==
All of the titles experienced a large upsurge in sales. According to Lee, Marvel proposed continuing the Heroes Reborn lineup indefinitely, but under the condition that Lee would draw at least one of them. Lee refused.

Critically, the storyline was not well received. The changes to the characters were controversial, provoking debates among fans. The change in creative team on Captain America was also controversial, since the pre-Heroes Reborn team of Mark Waid and Ron Garney had already been bringing increased sales and critical acclaim to the series, prompting the question of why it had required a reboot by Liefeld, whose artwork on the title was heavily criticized for its poor anatomy and skill, so much so that it has been subject to parody.

=== Cancelled and relaunched titles ===
- Fantastic Four #416 – September 1996 (relaunched as Fantastic Four Vol. 2 #1)
- Avengers #402 – September 1996 (relaunched as Avengers Vol. 2 #1)
- Iron Man #332 – September 1996 (relaunched as Iron Man Vol. 2 #1)
- Captain America #454 – August 1996 (relaunched as Captain America Vol. 2 #1)
- Thor #502 – September 1996 (renamed Journey into Mystery from #503)
- Heroes Reborn 1/2
- Avengers #1–13
- Captain America #1–13
- Fantastic Four #1–13
- Iron Man #1–13
- Marvel Spotlight Heroes Reborn/Onslaught Reborn #1
- Heroes Reborn Ashema #1
- Heroes Reborn Doom #1
- Heroes Reborn Doomsday #1
- Heroes Reborn Masters of Evil #1
- Heroes Reborn Rebel #1
- Heroes Reborn Remnants #1
- Heroes Reborn Young Allies #1
- Heroes Reborn: The Return #1–4

== "Heroes Return" ==
The "Heroes Reborn" was followed by "Heroes Return", which consisted of a central, four-issue miniseries, Heroes Reborn: The Return, by writer Peter David and artist Salvador Larocca (December 1997). In the story, the Celestials take notice of Franklin's pocket universe and initially demand that he eliminate one of the two universes, but eventually relent on the condition that all beings native to Earth-616 evacuate the pocket universe and never return.

The heroes are gathered in a massive ship to leave the pocket universe. Characters including She-Hulk and several members of the Inhuman Royal Family are depicted as returning heroes, even though they were not among the missing heroes from Onslaught: Marvel Universe. Though it was later mentioned that these versions of them merged with their regular counterparts.

As the heroes travel to their destination, Dr. Doom suddenly escapes the ship with Franklin, hoping to use the siphoning devices he created to steal Franklin's power, but is stopped by Mr. Fantastic and Thor, who rescue the boy. Thor uses his hammer to create a portal, trapping himself and Doom in it.

As soon as the remaining heroes break the boundaries between the two worlds, they all suddenly remember their past lives. Bruce Banner and the Hulk are merged back together into one singular being. The returned Anthony Stark possesses the memories of both the original and teenage Anthony Stark, and thus considers himself to be essentially both of them.

The pocket universe was then placed under the authority of Ashema the Listener. Eventually, Thor is returned to Asgard, while Doom's whereabouts are left unknown.

=== Cancelled and relaunched titles ===
- Fantastic Four Vol. 2 #13 (relaunched as Fantastic Four Vol. 3 #1 - January 1998)
- Avengers Vol. 2 #13 (relaunched as Avengers Vol. 3 #1 - February 1998)
- Iron Man Vol. 2 #13 (relaunched as Iron Man Vol. 3 #1 - February 1998)
- Captain America Vol. 2 #13 (relaunched as Captain America Vol. 3 #1 - January 1998)
- Journey into Mystery #521 (replaced by Thor Vol. 2 #1 - July 1998)
- Heroes Reborn: The Return #1-4
- Fantastic Four #1-4
- Iron Man #1-2
- Captain America #1-3
- Avengers #1-2
- Thor #1

== "Heroes Reborn" revisited ==
In 1999, Marvel collected Heroes Reborn: The Return #1-4 limited series re-titled as Return of the Heroes trade paperback under the 'Marvel's Finest' banner. It was re-released in 2009 as Heroes Reborn: The Return trade paperback again collecting the 4-issue mini-series, and also the Heroes Reborn one-shot specials from 2000: Doomsday #1, Ashema #1, Masters of Evil #1, Rebel #1, Remnants #1, Young Allies #1, and Doom #1.

In July 2000, Marvel published the trade paperback Fantastic Four: Heroes Reborn, collecting Fantastic Four vol. 2, issues #1-6 (also under the 'Marvel's Finest' banner), but no other "Heroes Reborn" reprints followed for some time.

With 2006 marking the 10th anniversary of the "Heroes Reborn" crossover, Marvel marked the occasion by having the reality-traversing Exiles team visit the "Heroes Reborn" Earth, in Exiles #81-82. The company reprinted original "Heroes Reborn" series and produced trade paperbacks collecting issues #1-12 (excluding the series finale cross-over "World War III") of the four titles. A new edition of Heroes Reborn: Fantastic Four trade paperback was released in August 2018 (ISBN 1-302-91333-6). Also, Jeph Loeb and Rob Liefeld reunited in November 2006 for Onslaught Reborn, a five-part weekly limited series that features both Onslaught and a world similar to the "Heroes Reborn" universe. This was planned to tie in with the memorial scholarship fund established in honor of Loeb's son Sam.

In 2021, Marvel published a Heroes Reborn storyline consisting of a central miniseries by Jason Aaron and Ed McGuinness, though it bears no relationship to the 1996 story beyond its title and some in-story references.

== Collected editions ==
- Return of the Heroes - collects Heroes Reborn: The Return #1-4 (1999, ISBN 0-7851-0705-3)
- Fantastic Four: Heroes Reborn TPB (Trade Paperback) - collects Fantastic Four vol. 2 #1-6 (2000, ISBN 0-7851-0744-4)
- Heroes Reborn: Avengers TPB - collects Avengers vol. 2 #1-12 (2006, ISBN 0-7851-2337-7)
- Heroes Reborn: Captain America TPB - collects Captain America vol. 2 #1-12 (2006, ISBN 0-7851-2339-3)
- Heroes Reborn: Fantastic Four TPB - collects Fantastic Four vol. 2 #1-12 (2006, ISBN 0-7851-2336-9); second edition (August 2018, ISBN 1-302-91333-6)
- Heroes Reborn: Iron Man TPB - collects Iron Man vol. 2 #1-12 (2006, ISBN 0-7851-2338-5)
- Heroes Reborn: The Return TPB - collects Heroes Return #1-4, Doomsday #1, Ashema #1, Masters of Evil #1, Rebel #1, Remnants #1, Young Allies #1, and Doom #1. (2009, ISBN 0-7851-3748-3)
- Onslaught Reborn TPB - collects Onslaught Reborn #1-5 (2008, ISBN 0-7851-2191-9)
