= List of Marvel Comics Golden Age characters =

The following is a list of Marvel Comics Golden Age characters and teams that first appeared in Marvel Comics during the Golden Age of Comic Books (late 1930s and c. 1950), under both of Marvel's previous names, Timely Comics and Atlas Comics.

== Characters ==
=== 1930s ===
Character	Note(s)
American Ace (Perry Wade)	American Ace was introduced in April 139 as part of Motion Picture funnies #1 published by Timely Comics
Angel (Thomas Halloway)	Member of the All-Winners Squad and the V-Battalion; founder and financial backer of the Scourge of the Underworld program.
Human Torch (Jim Hammond)	Member of the Invaders, V-Battalion, All-Winners Squad, Suicide Specials, and SHIELD.
Ka-Zar the Great (David Rand)	Pre-Marvel hero of the African jungle; originally created in 1936 by Martin Goodman before moving to Timely.
Lady Dorma	First wife of Namor; later killed by Llyra; her body was emulsified by Vyrra in an effort to harvest material to clone her.
Masked Raider (Jim Gardley)	Cowboy hero, framed for cattle rustling by a racketeer but later would break out of prison.
Namor the Sub-Mariner (Namor McKenzie)	Member of the All-Winners Squad and the Invaders.
Phineas Horton	Father of Frankie Raye; built the android Human Torch; killed when he refused to destroy the Human Torch.

=== 1940s ===
Character	Note(s)
American Avenger (Don Caldwell)	Alleged reincarnation of el Gaucho; spent years as an exchange student in Buenos Aires; given a costume by the grandson of an ally of el Gaucho; aided in the defeat of a Nazi plot in Argentina; whereabouts and status unknown.
Archie the Gruesome (Archie)	Janitor who tried to fight crime with his cleaning tools.
Armless Tiger Man	Armless fighter with sharpened teeth and feet.
Mad Dog (Buzz Baxter)	
Miss Fury (Marla Drake)	Also known as Black Fury.
Black Marvel (Daniel Lyons)	Became the mentor of the Slingers; deceased.
Harry Blackstone	Whereabouts and status unknown
Black Widow (Claire Voyant)	Empowered by demon/Satan and sent to Earth to retrieve the souls of those so wicked he could not stand to have them remain living; accompanied the Invaders; member of The Twelve.
Blazing Skull (Mark Anthony Todd)	Former member of the Invaders, both golden and modern age; alleged uncle of Ion; member of the Last Defenders.
Blonde Phantom (Louise Grant Mason)	Former member of the All-Winners Squad; works for Blake Tower.
Blue Blade (Roy Chambers)	Member of the Twelve
Blue Blaze (Spencer Keen)	Whereabouts and status unknown
Blue Diamond (Elton T. Morrow)	Former member of the Liberty Legion; whereabouts and status unknown.
Black Rider (Kim Lewis)	Bareback rider who took a costumed identity to stir up trouble for fun; exposed, and forced to cease and desist by Two-Gun Kid.
Black Rider (Dr. Matthew "Doc" Masters)	Masked cowboy who rode a horse named Satan/Ichabod.
Bucky (James Buchanan Barnes)	Was thought dead; former member of the Liberty Legion, Kid Commandos, Invaders and Young Allies; found to be alive by Captain America; assassin, called the Winter Soldier, for the Soviet Union since 1945; in suspended animation when not on missions; appears to be in his mid–late twenties; has become the new Captain America.
Captain America (Steven Rogers)	Former member of the Invaders and later the Avengers.
Captain Daring	One of two people who took up the Captain Daring mantle; whereabouts and status unknown.
Captain Terror (Daniel "Dan" Kane)	Former ally of Puck; faked his own death at end of the Spanish Civil War while battling El Aguila; returned to action during a Nazi U-boat attack; whereabouts and status unknown.
Captain Wonder (Jeff Jordan)	Member of the Twelve
The Challenger (William "Bill" Waring)	World War II hero and former law student; traveled around the world to learn the right skills to avenge his father who was killed for giving State evidence to a District Attorney; traveled forward in time; part of the federal government's Fifty State Initiative as a member of Freedom Force.
Citizen V (John Watkins)	Former member of the V-Battalion; deceased.
Dakor the Magician	Whereabouts and status unknown
The Defender (Donald "Don" Stevens)	Partner of Rusty; killed in the 1940s by Alexander Bont.
Destroyer (Kevin "Keen" Marlow)	Shared the identity with Brian Falsworth, son of the original Union Jack; became second Union Jack, active after WWII until killed in a car accident in 1953.
Jeff Dix	Whereabouts and status unknown
David "Davey" Drew	Whereabouts and status unknown
Dynamic Man (Curt Cowan)	Member of the Twelve
Electro the Robot	Member of the Twelve
Falcon (Carl Burgess)	Whereabouts and status unknown
Father Time (Larry Scott)	Fought during World War II; father was framed for murder but was acquitted too late; defends those falsely accused of crimes.
Ferret	Detective with a pet ferret; killed by Nazi agents.
Fiery Mask (Dr. Jack Castle)	Physician who was empowered by the Zombie Masters machine; member of the Twelve, deceased.
The Fighting Yank (William "Bill" Prince)	Whereabouts and status unknown
Flexo the Rubber Man	Robot made of special rubber (later retconned to be a Symbiote).
The Fin (Peter Noble)	Former member of the New Invaders; whereabouts and status unknown.
The Fourth Musketeer	Ghost of French swashbuckler who traveled to the United States to fight Nazi spies during World War II; whereabouts and status unknown.
Dr. Gade	Whereabouts and status unknown
Gary Gaunt	Whereabouts and status unknown
Golden Girl (Betsy Ross)	Fought during World War II; ally of Captain America (Rogers) and Bucky Barnes and then, later, Captain America (Jeffrey Mace) and Bucky (Fred Davis); secret Government agent working for the FBI; dated Steve Rogers.
The Ghost of Benjamin Franklin	Lives with Deadpool.
Hercules	Whereabouts and status unknown
Human Top (Bruce Bravelle)	Struck by lightning during an experiment, causing super-spinning powers; appeared in two stories in 1940 and 1942; whereabouts and status unknown.
Isbisa (Simon Meke)	Former enemy of the All-Winners Squad; former assistant to the director at the Museum of Natural History; in 1949, sabotaged a nuclear reactor in an effort to kill Miss America and Whizzer which caused their son to be born a mutant; returned to siphon power and kill Nuklo (Robert Frank Jr.) to avenge himself against Whizzer; became a professor at Columbia University.
Jerry "Headline" Hunter	Whereabouts and status unknown
Jack Frost	Former member of the Liberty Legion; allowed himself to be swallowed by an ice worm in the Arctic to protect an Inuit tribe who worshiped him as a god; briefly resuscitated and fought alongside Captain America against the worm before being swallowed once more.
Zephyr Jones	Whereabouts and status unknown
Kid Colt (Blaine Colt)	Hero and gunslinger of the 1870s American West; became outlaw after avenging father's death; shot in the back and killed by the bounty hunter Gunhawk at the conclusion of the battle.
Laughing Mask (Dennis Burtin)	Member of the Twelve; also known as Purple Mask.
Magar the Mystic	Whereabouts and status unknown
Major Liberty (John Liberty)	World War II hero; professor of American history; status and whereabouts unknown.
Hurricane (Makkari)	Member of the Eternals; formerly of First Line; whereabouts and status unknown.
Mantor the Magician	Whereabouts and status unknown
Marvel Boy (Martin Oskner Burns)	Whereabouts and status unknown
Marvel Boy (Martin Simon Burns)	Alleged reincarnation of Hercules; whereabouts unknown.
Marvex the Super Robot	Whereabouts and status unknown
Mastermind Excello (Earl Everett)	Member of the Twelve
Merzah the Mystic	Heroic crime fighter who hunted foreign spies; assisted by Diana Derrick and José Santa Cruz; whereabouts and status unknown
Millie the Model (Millicent "Millie" Collins)	Former model and manager of a modeling agency; also known as Blonde Bombshell and Blonde Phantom.
Mister E (Victor J "Victor Jay" Goldstein)	Member of the Twelve
Miss America (Madeline Joyce Frank)	Former member of the Liberty Legion, Invaders, All-Winners Squad; thought to be the mother of Pietro and Wanda Maximoff; deceased.
Miss Patriot (Mary Morgan)	Whereabouts and status unknown
Monako, Prince of Magic	Whereabouts and status unknown
Monstro the Mighty	50-foot (15 m) tall giant; son of the god Mars; whereabouts and status unknown.
Moon Man	Whereabouts and status unknown
Tim Mulrooney	Former sidekick of Captain Wonder; embarked on solo career through 1940s and 50s; recently sought out Captain Wonder at The Twelve's mansion, last seen standing on a rooftop contemplating suicide.
Namora (Aquaria Nautica Neptunia)	Former member of the Avengers, 1950s; member of the Agents of Atlas.
The Patriot (Jeffrey Mace)	Former member of the Liberty Legion and All-Winners Squad; retconned as third Captain America whose tales would have been featured in Captain America Comics #59–75 (Nov. 1946 – Feb. 1950); deceased.
Phantom Bullet (Allan Lewis)	Shot and killed in an alley in the spring of 1941, according to The Marvels Project #2.
Phantom of the Underworld ("Doc" Denton)	Whereabouts and status unknown
Phantom Reporter (Richard "Dick" Jones)	Member of the Twelve and working for the Daily Bugle.
Red Raven	Former member of the Liberty Legion; whereabouts and status unknown.
Red Skull (Johann Schmidt)	Formerly led the Skeleton Crew and Exiles and funded ULTIMATUM, Watchdogs and the Scourge program; trained by Hitler to be his successor; mind transferred into a clone of Captain America's body by Arnim Zola; face later scarred by Dust of Death; assassinated by the Winter Soldier for Aleksander Lukin but his mind was transferred into Lukin's body.
Ringmaster of Death	Captain America Comics #5
Rockman (Daniel Rose)	Member of the Twelve
Roko the Amazing (Lon Crag)	Whereabouts and status unknown
Robert "Bob" Roland	Whereabouts and status unknown
Secret Stamp (Roddy Colt)	Whereabouts and status unknown
Silver Scorpion (Elizabeth Barstow)	Member of the V-Battalion; has Alzheimers.
Subbie	Whereabouts and status unknown
Sun Girl (Mary Mitchell)	Fought during World War II; partner of Human Torch as well as his former personal secretary; replaced Toro as Torch's sidekick when Toro left to tend to his ailing foster mother; replaced when Toro returned; whereabouts and status unknown.
Super Slave	Whereabouts and status unknown
Jim "Taxi" Taylor	Whereabouts and status unknown
Terror (Laslo Pevely)	Fought during World War II; became amnesiac and was given a chemical by Dr. Storm which was derived from the brain of a dog that had gone into a fury and killed a gorilla; powers eventually faded but regained them to assist She-Hulk against the Band of the Bland.
Thin Man (Dr. Bruce Dickson)	Former member of the Liberty Legion and the New Invaders; whereabouts and status unknown.
Thunderer (Jerry Carstairs)	Also known as the Black Avenger; whereabouts and status unknown.
Toro (Thomas Raymond)	Formerly of the All-Winners Squad, Kid Commandos, Invaders and the Young Allies; deceased.
Trojak the Tiger Man	Also known as Tigerman; whereabouts and status unknown.
The Vagabond (Patrick "Pat" Murphy)	Whereabouts and status unknown
Terrence "Terry" Vance	Whereabouts and status unknown
Vision (Aarkus)	Extradimensional entity from Smoke World who allied with Markham Ericsohn and Professor Enoch Mason; briefly forced to assist Doctor Death]] in Project: Mohave; whereabouts and status unknown.
Tommy Tyme	Whereabouts and status unknown
Venus (Aphrodite)	Thought to be a member of the Greek pantheon of gods.
Patsy Walker	Later known as Hellcat; member of the Alaska Initiative.
Whizzer (Robert L. Frank)	Former member of the Liberty Legion, Invaders and All-Winners Squad; deceased.
The Witness	Member of the Twelve
Mr Wu	Whereabouts and status unknown
Avenger (William "Bill" Byron)	Whereabouts and status unknown
Zara of the Jungle	Whereabouts and status unknown

=== 1950s ===
Character	Note(s)
Human Robot (M-11)	Member of the G-Men and Agents of Atlas; built by New York scientist; programmed to kill its creator then killed saboteur; went on rampage in New York but short-circuited when it fell into the harbor; apparently found by Namora and rebuilt by Marvel Boy (Robert Grayson); affiliated with the Atlas Foundation.
Byrrah	Atlantean prince and the son of Brynn; cousin of Namor; frequent ally of Krang, Attuma and Llyra; frequently plotted against Namor; slain by agents of Suma-ket.
Electro (Ivan Kronov)	Soviet soldier who mutated into an electrical being; rendered comatose by being immersed in water; later revived by Red Skull (Albert Malik) to retrieve Hitler's strongbox; re-empowered by the Yellow Claw and fought the G-Men.
Gorilla-Man (Arthur Nagan)	Member of the Headmen and Lethal Legion; former surgeon who took organs from gorillas to use in people until allegedly gorillas somehow transplanted his head onto a gorilla's body.
Gorilla-Man (Ken Hale)	Member of the G-Men; S.H.I.E.L.D.'s Howling Commandos and Agents of Atlas; discovered and killed legendary Kenyan Gorilla-Man resulting in his transformation into the new Gorilla-Man.
Jann of the Jungle (Jane Hastings)	Former circus trapeze artist and animal trainer; later based in the Congo as a jungle adventurer; her grandmother was also named Jann and also lived in the Congo as an adventurer.
Marvel Boy (Robert "Bob" Grayson)	Was thought to have died after becoming the villain Crusader; later revealed to be alive and became a member of the Agents of Atlas.
Red Skull (Albert Malik)	Communist and leader of a spy ring; adopted the identity of Johann Schmidt while in suspended animation during the cold war; responsible for the deaths of Richard and Mary Parker; later executed by Scourge I-4.
Shrunken Bones (Jerold Morgan)	Member of the Headmen; attempted to create a shrinking potion but succeeded only in shrinking his bones and muscle.
Jimmy Woo (Woo Yen Jet)	Former FBI agent in the 1950s; former member of the G-Men and S.H.I.E.L.D., and leader of Agents of Atlas; old enemy of Yellow Claw; later revealed that Yellow Claw needed an heir and had chosen Jimmy.
Yellow Claw (Plan Chu)	Chinese would-be conqueror and former Khan of the Eternal Empire and CEO of the Atlas Foundation; possible member of the Immortal Nine; arranged for Jimmy Woo to be his successor; submitted to consumption by Mr. Lao upon completion of this task.

=== 1960s (pre-Fantastic Four #1) ===
Character	Note(s)
Abominable Snowman (Carl Hanson)	An explorer who was mutated into the legendary creature of the same name while using cursed picture to search for him.
Chondu the Mystic (Harvey Schlemmerman)	Member of the Headmen; minor adept at the mystic arts; had his brain transplanted into the body of Nighthawk and then Bambi; later an Inhuman construct with wings; exists as disembodied head and seeks permanent body.
Doctor Druid (Anthony Ludgate)	Former member of the Monster Hunters, Avengers, Shock Troops, Secret Defenders and the Legion of the Unliving; former psychiatrist; formerly employed by the United States Government as a consultant and operative in extranormal investigations; apparently killed by Nekra on behalf of Daimon Hellstrom; father of Druid.
Dragoom	Member of S.H.I.E.L.D.'s Howling Commandos monster force; escaped prison on homeworld and came to Earth with the intent of conquering it but fled when deceived by Victor Cartwright into believing there were other Vulcans on Earth.
Elektro	Former member of the Fin Fang Four; built as a supercomputer by Wilbur Poole but gained intelligence in a lab accident; enslaved Poole and forced him to build him a powerful body; power source removed by Poole; rebuilt as a mailroom employee at the Baxter Building and fell in love with Roberta.
Fin Fang Foom	A dragon-like alien and member of the Fin Fang Four.
Gargantus	Marine monster; whereabouts and status unknown.
Googam	Extraterrestrial and former member of the Fin Fang Four.
Goom	Alien from Planet X and father of Googam; later a member of S.H.I.E.L.D.'s Howling Commandos monster force.
Grogg	Member of S.H.I.E.L.D.'s Howling Commandos monster force; lived below the surface of Russia; revived and freed by an atomic bomb testing under Colonel Vorcutsky; captured and trapped sent to Mars
Gorgilla	Deviant mutate and former member of the Fin Fang Four; used as pawn by Kro and used to rampage in New York City; befriended by Dr. Druid after being freed by him; shrunk to human size by Reed Richards' molecular compactor and became a janitor at the Baxter Building; helped Elektro, Fin Fang Foom, and Googam defeat Tim Boo Ba.
Gorgolla	
Groot	Member of S.H.I.E.L.D.'s Howling Commandos monster force; member of the Guardians of the Galaxy; came to Earth seeking humans to capture and study; thought to be destroyed by termites released by Leslie Evans.
It the Living Colossus (Robert "Bob" O'Bryan)	Former member of S.H.I.E.L.D.'s Howling Commandos; immense stone statue constructed by Boris Petrovski to protest oppressive nature of Soviet government; animated initially by Kigors and rampaged briefly in Moscow after being attacked by military; later controlled by Bob O'Bryan; reduced from 100–30 ft (30.5–9.1 m) by Dr. Vault; eventually destroyed by Hulk; rebuilt as a robot and reformed by O’Bryan under the control of Lotus Newmark.
Kraa the Unhuman	Member of S.H.I.E.L.D.'s Howling Commandos monster unit; former tribesman in Wabuzi, Africa who was mutated by an explosion caused by Russian soldiers; fell to death from a cliff while saving the teacher from a python. He however survived the fall and was taken into S.H.I.E.L.D custody.
Magneto / Magnetor	Magneto was the monicker of Hunk Larken, a monster with magnetic powers who debuted in Strange Tales #84 (1961). His name was later changed to Magnetor to avoid confusion with the X-Men nemesis of the same name, who debuted two years later.
Molten Man-Thing	Deviant mutate and creature from a volcano; invaded the island of Napuka; battled by Makkari posing as Frank Harper; defeated when heat energy was dissipated by an immense fan.
Monsteroso	Youthful extraterrestrial who rampaged through New York until parents came for him; status and whereabouts unknown.
Orrgo	Member of S.H.I.E.L.D.'s Howling Commandos monster force; extraterrestrial space god who arrived on Earth and tried to conquer it multiple times in the past; summoned by the Headmen and controlled by the God from Beyond statue.
Tim Boo Ba	Alien conqueror and tyrant of an unnamed Microworld; seemingly drowned by a tear from an Earth child; later tricked Googam into using Reed Richards' Molecular Compactor to enlarge him and his army; rampaged across Earth until defeated by Elektro, Fin Fang Foom, Googam, and Gorgilla and imprisoned.
Xemnu the Titan	Extraterrestrial who attempted to recruit humans to repopulate his planet; defeated in the past by Joe Harper; whereabouts unknown.

== Modern Age Golden Age ==
These characters all appeared after Marvel Comics was established, but were retconned as characters who were active during the Golden Age.

Character	Note(s)
3-D Man (Charles "Chuck" Chandler)	3-D Man is the name of two superheroes appearing in American comic books published by Marvel Comics. The first incarnation of 3-D Man, a composite of two brothers, Charles and Hal Chandler, first appeared in Marvel Premiere #35 (April 1977).
Agent Axis (Hiroyuki Kanegawa, Aldo Malvagio, Berthold Volker)	Merged form of Japanese (Hiroyuki Kanegawa), German (Berthold Volker), & Italian (Aldo Malvagio) spies when their plane was struck by lightning; kidnapped Sam Sabuki to cure his schizophrenia which inadvertently resulted in the formation of the Kid Commandos; killed by Thin Man, but somehow reborn as the Pterorist.
Baron Von Blitzschlag	Nazi mad scientist; geneticist with the power to throw lightning from his hands, fought various heroes in Germany during the Second World War; working for the Initiative.
Bucky (Fred Davis)	Batboy who takes the place of Bucky after he is, seemingly, killed at the end of World War II; partner for Captain America II (Naslund) and Captain America III (Mace).
Bucky (Jack Monroe)	Deceased; became known as Nomad and Scourge of the Underworld.
Captain America (William Burnside/"Steve Rogers")	Sought Government sponsorship to become the next Captain America during the Korean War; impersonated Rogers during the 1950s until captured by US Government and placed in suspended animation; known as Grand Director; reawakened by Doctor Faustus to battle Bucky Barnes in his incarnation as the new Captain America.
Captain Wings	Member of the Crusaders; unable to serve in the British army due to his slight heart murmur; later abandoned his suit after the belt that powered his wings were destroyed and he learned of its Nazi origins; whereabouts and status unknown.
Crimson Commando (Frank Bohannan)	Former member of the department, Project Wideawake and Freedom Force
Destroyer (Roger Aubrey)	Former member of the V-Battalion and Crusaders
Ghost Girl	Member of the Crusaders; Scottish; used a machine given by Alfie; abandoned her equipment when she learned its origin and her belt that powered the equipment was destroyed.
Golden Girl (Gwenny Lou Sabuki)	Member of the Kid Commandos; Japanese-American and daughter of Dr. Sam Sabuki, mother of Golden Sun and grandmother of Goldfire; mutated by a weapon of Agent Axis when it was overloaded by Bucky and Toro; later known as Golden Woman.
Human Top (David Mitchell)	Member of the Kid Commandos, Penance Council and father of Topsin; mutated by a weapon of Agent Axis after it was overloaded by Bucky and Toro.
Master Man (Wilhelm Lohmer)	Nazi and Bundist; he was an agent of Hitler and member of Super-Axis; empowered by a variant of the super soldier serum created by Brain Drain; later married Warrior Woman and placed in suspended animation at the end of World War II by Dr. Friedrich Kraus under the direction of Baron Strucker; revived in modern times and had his powers siphoned by the new Master Man (Herr Nacht). He later resurfaced and helped Cable against Apocalypse, and was killed in battle; also known as Übermensch and the Mighty Destroyer.
Spirit of '76 (William Nasland)	Former member of the Invaders and All-Winners Squad; died as Captain America.
Spitfire (Lady Jacqueline Falsworth Critchton)	Spitfire (Lady Jacqueline Falsworth Crichton) is a superheroine appearing in American comic books published by Marvel Comics. Created by Roy Thomas and Frank Robbins, the character first appeared in the Invaders comic book series as an intended replacement for the Union Jack character, but the costume design did not fit the female torso. Instead, the character of Spitfire, named after the Supermarine Spitfire fighter plane, was created.
Stonewall (Louis Hamilton)	Former member of Freedom Force
Super Sabre (Martin Fletcher)	Former member of Freedom Force
U-Man (Meranno)	Atlantean and member of Super-Axis and Axis Mundi; father of Nia Noble through Lady Lotus; former research scientist and childhood friend of Namor; later banished by Namor.
Union Jack (James Montgomery Falsworth)	Union Jack is the name of three superheroes appearing in American comic books published by Marvel Comics. Created by Roy Thomas and Frank Robbins, the first Union Jack first appeared in Invaders #7 (July 1976).A second incarnation from the same creators appeared in The Invaders #21, and a third incarnation was created by Roger Stern and John Byrne for Captain America Vol. 1 #254 (February 1981).
Union Jack (Brian Falsworth)	
Wolverine	Logan fought beside Captain America in World War II.
Warrior Woman (Julia Koenig)	Julia Koenig[2] first appears in a multi-issue storyline in the title Invaders, posing as a servicewoman dating an American soldier in London during World War II. Koenig is revealed to be a Nazi spy, code-named Madame Rätsel (Madame Mystery),[3] who is sent to obtain information from a soldier, who was also a cartoonist and is suspected of knowing the secret of the Super-Soldier Serum, which originally empowered hero Captain America.
Lady Lotus	Lady Lotus was born in Japan, and exhibited strong psychic powers at a young age. She developed these abilities through constant meditation, and supplemented her powers with the sacred lotus flower. At the age of 21, she moved to the United States. Following the Japanese attack on Pearl Harbor, the United States began holding Japanese-Americans in concentration camps to determine their loyalties. Disgusted by this, Lady Lotus took refuge in New York's Chinatown and opened a curio shop called "The House of Lotus". She cast a subtle hypnotic suggestion over anyone who came into the store, convincing her customers that she was actually Chinese. Angered at how her people were being treated by the Americans, she vowed to destroy the United States, and allied with the Axis Powers.
Brain Drain	Werner Schmidt first appears as Brain Drain in the title Invaders, leading a group of beings claiming to be Teutonic gods against World War II superhero team the Invaders. Brain Drain recounts in flashback his origin to Captain America, explaining how a falling meteorite all but killed him. The "meteorite" was in fact a spaceship, with the four alien inhabitants saving Schmidt's brain and eyes and placing them in a robot body. With his brain waves heightened during the process, Schmidt dubs himself "Brain Drain" and taking mental control of the aliens - which he calls "Star Gods" - renames them after old German gods: Donar, Log, Froh, and Brunnhilde.
Baron Blood (John Falsworth)	John Falsworth first appears in the title Invaders as an English aristocrat. Although posing as the son of the first John Falsworth, it is revealed in flashback that the character is in fact the original, made possible due to the fact that he is now an ageless vampire.[3] When the family fortune is left to his older brother James, John Falsworth leaves England to pursue an interest of his - vampire lore. Falsworth travels to Transylvania and encounters the original vampire lord Dracula, who, after overpowering Falsworth, drains his blood and turns him into one of the undead.[4] Dracula then commands Falsworth to return to England and cause havoc in revenge for the deeds of his former opponent Jonathan Harker. Adopting the alias of "Baron Blood" (German: Freiherr Blut), the character allies with Germany during World War I and without either party realizing the identity of the other, battles his own brother, who is now the English hero Union Jack
Iron Cross	
Blue Bullet	
Comet (Harris Moore)	
Nick Fury	Leader of S.H.I.E.L.D
Dum Dum Dugan	
Gabe Jones	
Rebel Ralston	
Dino Manelli	Dino Manelli first appears in (Sgt. Fury and his Howling Commandos) issue 1 in 1963.
Izzy Cohen	
Junior Juniper	
Pinky Pinkerton	
Eric Koenig	
Leatherneck Raiders	
Baron Strucker	
Doctor Strange	Time wizard

== Teams ==
Team	Description	Membership
Three Xs	First appearing in 1940 (Mystic Comics Vol. 1 #1), these three non-powered adventurers fought against spies. They later appeared in marvel comics #1000	1X - the detective of the trio; 2X - the inventor of the trio; 3X - the strongman of the trio
Tough Kids Squad	Debuting in 1942 (Tough Kid Squad #1), the Tough Kids Squad was a group of teenage adventurers led by the Danger brothers. None of the teens or any of their relatives has been seen in the modern age.	Wally Danger - Gained genius-level intellect through an early version of the Super Soldier serum.; Tom Danger - Gained super strength through an early version of the Super Soldier serum.; Butch; Derrick Dawes; Eagle
Victory Boys	First appearing in Comedy Comics #10 (June 1942), the Victory Boys were a group of German orphans, led by an American boy named Victor, who fought against Nazis in Germany during the War. Neither the characters nor the team have appeared in the modern age.	Victor; Maxie Stein; Gus Weber; Warren Zumwald; Hans Brauer; Kurt Erzberger
Young Allies	First seen in Young Allies #1 (July 1941), the Young Allies were a group of teen boys who sometimes helped Captain America (Rogers). They were still active after World War II but, until 2009, only Bucky and Toro had been seen in the modern age; the remaining members reappeared in the Young Allies Special.	Jeff Sandervilt; Henry "Tubby" Tinkle; Percival "Knuckles" O'Toole; Washington "Wash" Carver Jones

== See also ==
- Marvel: The Lost Generation
- V-Battalion
- Warriors Three
- Timely Comics
