= Ruby Thursday =

Publication information
- Publisher: Marvel Comics
- First appearance: The Defenders #32 (February 1976)
- Created by: Steve Gerber; Sal Buscema; Jim Mooney

In-story information
- Full name: Thursday Rubinstein
- Species: Human/Cyborg
- Team affiliations: Headmen
- Abilities: High intelligence; Artificial red plastic head grants: Organic circuit constructs; Shapeshifting; Regeneration; Ejection head reflexes; Energy blasts and explosions

Ruby Thursday (Thursday Rubinstein) is a supervillain appearing in American comic books published by Marvel Comics. She is usually depicted as a member of the Headmen. She is named for The Rolling Stones song "Ruby Tuesday".

== Publication history ==
Ruby Thursday first appeared in The Defenders #32-33 (February–March 1976), and was created by Steve Gerber, Sal Buscema and Jim Mooney.

The character subsequently appears in Defenders #35 (May 1976), Defenders Annual #1 (October 1976), Omega the Unknown #9-10 (July, September 1976), Defenders #76-77 (October–November 1979), The Sensational She-Hulk vol. 2 #1-3 (May–July 1989), Web of Spider-Man #73 (February 1991), Deathlok #2-5 (August–November 1991), Marvel Comics Presents #97 (December 1992), The Defenders vol. 2 #5 (July 2001), 8-10 (October–December 2001), I ♥ Marvel: Outlaw Love (April 2006), She-Hulk vol. 2 #10 (October 2006), and Heroes for Hire #6-8 (March–May 2007).

Ruby Thursday appeared as part of the "Headmen" entry in the original Official Handbook of the Marvel Universe #5, and in The Official Handbook of the Marvel Universe Update '89 #3, and she received an entry in The All-New Official Handbook of the Marvel Universe A to Z: Update #4 (2007).

== Fictional character biography ==
Thursday was a scientist who grafted an organic computer to her head composed of malleable plastic that can assume any form she wills it to. She was recruited by Arthur Nagan into the supervillain group known as the Headmen. Her residence at the time was a mansion in Laurel Canyon. Her intentions at the time of joining the headmen were to replace the head of every human with a plastic head like hers.

Thursday ran for President of the United States as the candidate of the "Global Head" political party under the slogan "New heads for old". She was forced to drop out after Jack Norriss (associated with the superhero team known as the Defenders) tricked her into revealing her non-human self at a public campaign event. Shortly after the end of her presidential campaign, she was defeated by the Hulk and captured along with the rest of the Headmen by the Defenders.

She later partners with a large purple creature called Dibbuk (named after, but unrelated to a dybbuk) and bases herself in Las Vegas. She robs Omega the Unknown of $55,000 in casino winnings in a Las Vegas hotel room. Omega chases her on foot in Las Vegas. Police arriving on the scene see a superhuman man in costume (Omega) appearing to assault a normal woman (Ruby) in her car. Omega starts brawling with the police and they open fire killing him.

After the death of Omega, Ruby notices that his body is made up of advanced organic cybernetics. She steals his body from a Las Vegas morgue and attempts to dissect it intending to incorporate its technology into her head. Confronted by the Defenders, her plastic head is struck by Wasp's bio-electric "sting". The head breaks open and Dibbuk teleports a seriously wounded Ruby away. When next seen, her head appears much smaller.

Ruby later participates in the plan to gain her ally Chondu the Mystic a new body; specifically, the body of a clone of She-Hulk. The Headmen hire the Ringmaster and his Circus of Crime, then later Mysterio in order to test She-Hulk for compatibility. She is subdued and cloned, but escapes with the aid of Spider-Man. Ruby is arrested by the New York city police.

Ruby begins running weapons procurement scams against A.I.M. She partners with and becomes romantically involved with Answer. After having stolen money from A.I.M. on five occasions, A.I.M. hires the assassin Bullseye to kill Ruby. He uses her relationship with Answer to draw her out of hiding and throws the Rolling Stones album Flashpoint (which contains the song "Ruby Tuesday") into her chest apparently killing the biological portion of her body. Answer saves her head after Bullseye leaves in hopes of reviving her later.

During the Civil War storyline, Ruby is involved in a high-speed 'chase' through the streets of Manhattan. The super-heroine Hellcat ends up clinging to her bumper. Ruby uses her malleable head to fire a gun at Hellcat during the pursuit. The fight is ended with the intervention of She-Hulk and her allies. She-Hulk does not actually go for Ruby, she takes down Hellcat first for being an unlicensed superhero. The results of Ruby's rampage are shown in the forms of cars being shot up, people traumatized by this, and a cab ending up through the front window of a bookstore. Ruby is subdued by Two-Gun Kid, a licensed bounty hunter operating in New York.

In the special issue Concert of Champions, Ruby Thursday appears as a member of Deep Void, a band consisting entirely of villains.

== Powers and abilities ==
Ruby Thursday's head was replaced with a mass of "organic circuitry" which can alter its shape to form appendages or weapons. If the sphere is separated from her body, she can still control it, no matter how far. Ruby is also a scientific genius, with knowledge in engineering and robotics.
