= Rockman (character) =

- Cover art for The Twelve #6. Art by Paolo Rivera.

Publication information
- Publisher: Marvel Comics
- First appearance: U.S.A. Comics No. 1 (Aug. 1941)
- Created by: Charles Nicholas; Basil Wolverton

In-story information
- Alter ego: Daniel Rose
- Species: Human mutate
- Team affiliations: The Twelve
- Abilities: Superhuman strength, durability, and speed; Self-sustenance; Unarmed combat skills

Rockman is a fictional superhero appearing in American comic books published by Marvel Comics. The character first appeared in U.S.A. Comics No. 1 (August 1941), published by Marvel predecessor Timely Comics during the 1930s to 1940s period historians and fans call the Golden Age of Comics. As credits were not routinely given in comic books of this period, his writer and artist co-creators are unknown, although the first page of his debut story was drawn by Charles Nicholas (itself a house pen name) and the remainder by Basil Wolverton.

== Publication history ==
Rockman appeared in USA Comics #1–4 (Aug. 1941 – May 1942), with two stories drawn by Basil Wolverton and at least one signed by writer and future Marvel Comics editor-in-chief Stan Lee.

Marvel announced in July 2007 that Rockman would appear in the 2008 limited series The Twelve. The first three 1940s Rockman stories were reprinted in The Twelve No. 0 (Feb. 2008) and #1/2 (Nov. 2008).

== Fictional character biography ==
In his historical origin, Rockman was the leader of an underground race of beings who were the descendants of the first white colonists of North America. Their kingdom was known as Abyssmia, and was located underneath the country. Noticing the effects of war overhead, Rockman leaves Abyssmia to assist the United States in its war effort. He has super-strength and speed, has a super-tough body, and does not need oxygen to breathe.

=== The Twelve ===
Some time after his official introduction as a superhero, Rockman joins Captain America, the Invaders and a cadre of second-tier superheroes in the Battle of Berlin. There he is ambushed and captured along with Blue Blade, The Black Widow (unrelated to the modern character of that name), Captain Wonder, Dynamic Man, Fiery Mask, Laughing Mask, Master Mind Excello, Mister E, Phantom Reporter, the Witness and the telepathically controlled robot Electro.

As Electro is deactivated and unable to help the other heroes, they are doused with sleeping gas and placed in cryogenic stasis by Nazi scientists, who hope to dissect them and discover the secret of their superhuman abilities. Rockman, along with the others, is "lost" when the scientists are killed during the fall of Berlin. Years later in 2008, the heroes are found.

He and his teammates are brought to live in a luxurious mansion, while adjusting to modern life; a task in which he fails miserably. Still pining for his lost kingdom, Rockman never moves from the basement, futilely slamming his hands on the ground in an attempt to contact any Abyssmians.

It is strongly hinted that Rockman's historical origin has simply been a delusional fantasy when Danielle Rose, a young girl from West Virginia, tells the military caretakers of Rockman that the hero may be her lost great-uncle Daniel Rose. Apparently, Rose was a miner who lived in Tarleton, West Virginia, and became well known for being the first miner to advocate unionizing. Rose lived there with his wife and daughter (whom he referred to as his "little princess"), until Boss Clete, the corrupt head of the Lufton Fuel Company, hired some thugs to silence the growing trade union. Rose accepted the fight, and brought his trade union down into the mine to confront Clete's men. At the last moment, Boss Clete attempted to flee, while exploding behind himself a hidden dynamite charge that was intended to seal off the mine and kill Daniel Rose and his men. However, Boss Clete forgot to take in account the eventual methane chain reactions. As a result, the mine collapsed around the men, killing everyone except for Rose. Exposure to hidden pockets of an "unknown mutagenic gas" gave him extended reserves of strength and durability, along with making him impervious to harm. When Rose returned to the surface, after two days of constant digging, he discovered that the resulting sinkhole had swallowed the whole of Tarleton, killing everyone he held dear, included his beloved wife and his "little princess".

Daniel Rose snapped, and in his stupor was left pounding the ground, calling his lost family to him. Exhausted and utterly unbalanced, Rose abandoned his town only to resurface later as "Rockman, King of Abyssmia", which may have been a psychological coping mechanism to deal with the shattered fragments of his former life.

Rockman's story ends ambiguously. He is caught in a collapsing building, and apparently hears his "princess" coming to get him. When his team-mates excavate, in an attempt to retrieve his body, they instead find a tunnel that goes for a mile into the Earth.

== Powers, abilities, and equipment ==
Besides having access to advanced Abyssmian technology, including a "digger car" for transport and monitoring equipment, Rockman has immense strength, durability, and speed, as well as combat mastery. He does not need food, air, or water and can withstand extreme pressures from under the sea.

After his revival in The Twelve, he did not explain that these powers came from the exposure to a still unknown underground gas. As Rockman is revealed to be a citizen of the U.S.A. named Daniel Rose, his Abyssmian technology are now enhanced digging instruments, as he was a professional miner.

His mental state (precarious after the tragic loss of his family) continues to erode when he is brought into modern times. Rockman is in a state of constant mourning, waiting for his dead loved ones to return.
