= I Love Marvel =

Comic book series

- Cover of I (heart) Marvel Masked Intentions #1 (March 2006). Art by Gez Fry.

Publication information
- Publisher: Marvel Comics
- Format: Limited series
- Genre: Superhero; Romance
- Publication date: 2006
- No. of issues: 5

Creative team
- Written by: Vol 1: Daniel Way
- Artist(s): Vol 1: Ken Knudtsen

I ♥ Marvel (also known as I Heart Marvel or I Love Marvel and commonly stylized as I (heart) Marvel) is a series of connected one-shots published by Marvel Comics. The comic book series was released in February 2006 and cover-dated April 2006 to coincide with the romance-themed holiday of Valentine's Day.

The comic books tell several romantic stories featuring characters from the Marvel Comics. Each issue focuses on a different area of the Marvel Universe. Despite appearing to be a typical fifth-week event comic, February 2006, like every February (excepting leap years), had only four weeks.

== Concept and creation ==
=== Development ===
Marvel Comics Editor Aubrey Sitterson stated, "I (Heart) Marvel aims to pay homage to a (somewhat) forgotten part of mainstream comics, while sparking new interest in the genre. [...] There is always a chance that something larger could spin out of an event like this. It's no big secret that one of the most useful parts of month-long events like this, or the Marvel Monster Month is to gauge fan reaction and interest. If it looked like fans would eat up a monthly romance comic--whether related to the stories we have cooked up for February or not--you better believe we'd be diving in head first to get it to you."

=== Publication history ===
My Mutant Heart was released on February 1, 2006. Web of Romance was released on February 8, 2006. Marvel Ai was released on February 15, 2006. Outlaw Love was released on February 22, 2006. Masked Intentions was released on March 1, 2006.

== Issues ==
=== My Mutant Heart ===
My Mutant Heart was the first one-shot published and was an X-Men-centric issue. The issue included the following stories:

- The Promise - A Wolverine story written by Daniel Way and with art by Ken Knutsden. Wolverine recalls an affair that he had in Berlin in 1943.
- How Love Works - A Doop story written by Peter Milligan with art by Marcos Martin. A private investigator follows a woman who is having an affair with Doop.
- My Girlfriend, The Thief! - A story about Cannonball written and drawn by Tim Fish.

=== Web of Romance ===
This second issue focuses on Spider-Man as he tries to think of a gift to give to Mary Jane Watson for Valentine's Day. The story was written by Tom Beland and with art by Cory Walker and Cliff Rathburn.

=== Marvel Ai ===
Marvel Ai (subtitled Ai = Love or Ai is Japanese for Love) was the third issue and featured various Marvel heroes and manga-inspired art. The stories included were all written by C. B. Cebulski and were as follows:

- Meld With You - (Art by Tomoko Taniguchi) The Scarlet Witch recalls her date with The Vision.
- The Silence of the Heart - (Art by Kei Kobayashi) Medusa contemplates her relationship with Black Bolt.
- Love is Blindness - (Art by Toga) A story without speech in which Black Widow and Elektra fight over Daredevil.

=== Outlaw Love ===
Written by Fabian Nicieza and with art by Jon Proctor, this issue focuses on the relationship between supervillains Answer and Ruby Thursday. Bullseye also appears, as do the Sisters of Sin (Torso, Slash, Hoodwink, and Raunch) in a cameo.

=== Masked Intentions ===
Fabian Nicieza wrote this issue which presents two different stories of young superheroes in love.

- First Kiss - (Art by Paco Medina) Squirrel Girl is infatuated with Speedball.
- Last Date - (Art by Mike Norton) Justice and Firestar of the New Warriors prepare for their wedding, but Firestar has cold feet.

== Reception ==
=== Critical response ===
Ryan Ten of Screen Rant included the I ♥ Marvel comic book series in their "10 Most Romantic Comic Books" list, writing, "The novelty of getting to see famous Marvel characters experience or reflect on love is heartwarming across the board, and a different flavor from what is normally seen in the comics." Cailyn Szelinski of Comic Book Resources ranked the I ♥ Marvel comic book series 9th in their "10 Cutest Romance Comics."

=== Sales ===
According to Diamond Comic Distributors, My Mutant Heart was the 170th best selling comic book in February 2006. Web of Romance was the 165th best selling comic book in February 2006. Marvel Ai was the 179th best selling comic book in February 2006. Outlaw Love was the 183rd best selling comic book in February 2006. Masked Intentions was the 215th best selling comic book in March 2006.
