= Farley Stillwell =

Fictional character appearing in Marvel Comics

Dr. Farley Stillwell
- Farley Stillwell as seen in Amazing Spider-Man #20.

Publication information
- Publisher: Marvel Comics
- First appearance: The Amazing Spider-Man #20 (1965)
- Created by: Stan Lee; Steve Ditko

In-story information
- Species: Human
- Abilities: Genius-level intellect

Farley Stillwell is a fictional character appearing in American comic books published by Marvel Comics. He is a scientist best known for transforming Mac Gargan into the Scorpion.

== Publication history ==
Stillwell first appeared in The Amazing Spider-Man #20 (January 1965), and was created by writer Stan Lee and artist Steve Ditko.

== Fictional character biography ==
When J. Jonah Jameson first hires Peter Parker, he was amazed at how he managed to obtain pictures of Spider-Man. He hires private investigator Mac Gargan to look into this. When Jameson sees an article about inducing animalistic mutations in humans, he visits the scientist who established the experiment: Farley Stillwell. Jameson initially believes Stillwell to be a crackpot, but later sees him as an opportunity to take down Spider-Man. When he first goes to see Stillwell in his lab, Jameson has him experiment on Gargan. Stillwell gives Gargan a high-tech scorpion-suit, causing him to become the criminal Scorpion. Shortly after the experiment, Stillwell runs tests and finds that his experiment is not a true success; Scorpion would lose his sanity as he got stronger. Creating an antidote, Stillwell heads to where Spider-Man was fighting the Scorpion. After learning the side effects of the formula from Stillwell, Scorpion decides that he wants to keep his powers and climbs up a building. Stillwell climbs up after him, but loses his grip and falls to his death.

=== Legacy ===
It was later revealed that Farley Stillwell had a brother named Harlan Stillwell who used the experiment to create the Human Fly after Richard Deacon held him at gunpoint. After Deacon becomes the Human Fly, he shoots and kills Harlan.

The Stillwell brothers' technology would also be used to give superpowers to the Answer, and the fourth Vulture.

The sixth volume of The Amazing Spider-Man reveals that Regent's minion Shannon Stillwell is the sister of Farley and Harlan Stillwell. Their mother is Melodia Stillwell, who is also known as Madame Monstrosity and similarly specializes in combining animal and human DNA to create her Humanimals. Farley's father Jeremy Stillwell was turned into an owl Humanimal after being fused with an owl; an attempt to restore Jeremy to normal resulted in Jeremy's mind being in the owl's body and vice versa.

== Skills and abilities ==
Farley Stillwell is a brilliant biologist and cyberneticist.

== Other versions ==
An alternate universe version of Farley Stillwell from Earth-58163 appears in House of M: Avengers #1 as one of several scientists who gave Luke Cage his powers.

== In other media ==
=== Television ===
- Farley Stillwell appears in Spider-Man (1967), voiced by Tom Harvey.
- Farley Stillwell makes a cameo appearance in The Amazing Spider-Man episode "Wolfpack", portrayed by Joseph G. Medalis.
- Farley Stillwell appears in Spider-Man: The Animated Series, voiced by Michael Rye. This version was involved in neogenic research that would later lead to Peter Parker becoming Spider-Man and the creation of the neogenic recombinator machine.

=== Video games ===
A female character based on Farley Stillwell, simply referred to as Doctor Stillwell, appears in Spider-Man 3, voiced by Nika Futterman. She is the head of a science corporation called MechaBioCon who captured Scorpion for use in her military cybernetics and mind-control experiments.
