= Crusaders (Marvel Comics) =

Group of fictional characters by Marvel Comics

- The Crusaders battle the American superhero team the Invaders on the cover of The Invaders #15 (April 1977), art by Jack Kirby

Publication information
- Publisher: Marvel Comics
- First appearance: The Invaders #14 (March 1977)
- Created by: Roy Thomas; Jack Kirby; Frank Robbins

In-story information
- Member(s): Captain Wings; Dyna-Mite; Ghost Girl; The Spirit of '76; Thunder Fist; Tommy Lightning

The Crusaders is a group of fictional characters appearing in American comic books published by Marvel Comics. The team first appeared in The Invaders #14 (March 1977) and were created by Roy Thomas, Jack Kirby, and Frank Robbins.

== Creation ==
The Crusaders were based on the DC Comics superhero team the Freedom Fighters. The character associations are: Captain Wings and the Black Condor; Dyna-Mite and Doll Man; Ghost Girl and the Phantom Lady; the Spirit of '76 and Uncle Sam; Thunder Fist and the Human Bomb; and Tommy Lightning and the Ray.

At the same time that the Invaders were meeting the Crusaders in Marvel Comics, DC Comics' team the Freedom Fighters was also meeting a team named the Crusaders, with the DC version of the Crusaders based on Marvel's team the Invaders (four of the Crusaders who fought the Freedom Fighters were actually comic book fans named "Lennie" (Len Wein), "Marvin" (Marv Wolfman), "Arch" (Archie Goodwin), and "Roy" (Roy Thomas), as shown in Freedom Fighters #9).

== Fictional team history ==
The team first appeared in a Marvel comic book series that took place in World War II titled The Invaders and capture the crew of a crashed German bomber. Accepted by the British people, the team (Captain Wings, Dyna-Mite, Ghost Girl, the Spirit of '76, Thunder Fist, and Tommy Lightning) becomes the official protectors of the current King (George VI), therefore replacing the American superhero team the Invaders. The Crusaders are revealed to be guided by a taxi cab driver and apparent British spy known only as "Alfie", who can cancel their powers courtesy of a technological belt that he wears.

Dyna-Mite, who has no memory of his former life, becomes suspicious and spies on "Alfie", learning both that he is a Nazi agent and that he is planning to use the Crusaders to assassinate the King. Dyna-Mite warns the Invaders, and "Alfie" instigates a fight between the Invaders and the Crusaders. The Nazi agent is killed in a car crash while attempting to escape from the Human Torch. The Crusaders, now powerless, disband willingly, although Dyna-Mite—revealed to be Roger Aubrey, a close friend of Brian Falsworth, the brother of Invader Spitfire—remains trapped at a small size.

Aubrey is eventually returned to his normal size and adopts Falsworth's former heroic identity as the Destroyer, now calling himself the Mighty Destroyer (as Falsworth eventually succeeded his father, James Montgomery Falsworth, as Union Jack).
