= Agent Axis =

Agent Axis, in comics, may refer to:

- Agent Axis (DC Comics), the name of two DC Comics supervillains
- Agent Axis (Marvel Comics), a Marvel Comics supervillain
