= The Twelve (comics) =

Comic book series

- Promotion art for The Twelve #1 by Kaare Andrews.

Publication information
- Publisher: Marvel Comics
- Schedule: Monthly
- Format: Limited series
- Genre: Superhero
- No. of issues: 12
- Main character(s): Black Widow; Blue Blade; Captain Wonder; Dynamic Man; Electro; Fiery Mask; Laughing Mask; Master Mind Excello; Mister E Phantom Reporter; Rockman; Witness

Creative team as of October 2008
- Created by: J. Michael Straczynski; Chris Weston
- Written by: J. Michael Straczynski
- Penciller: Chris Weston
- Inker(s): Garry Leach; Chris Weston
- Letterer(s): Comicraft; Jimmy Betancourt
- Colorist: Chris Chuckry
- Editor(s): Tom Brevoort; Molly Lazer; Joe Quesada

Collected editions
- Volume 1 hardcover: ISBN 0-7851-3372-0

The Twelve is an American comic book limited series from Marvel Comics, which the company announced in July 2007 would run twelve issues beginning spring 2008, with the creative team of writer J. Michael Straczynski and artist Chris Weston. The series stars 12 obscure superheroes from Marvel's earliest incarnation as Timely Comics from the 1940s period historians and fans call the Golden Age of Comic Books.

== Premise ==
Writer J. Michael Straczynski said in July 2007 that the story concerns 12 superhumans randomly kidnapped by the Nazis during World War II to study their powers for the Nazis' "Master Race" efforts. The superhumans were put in cryonic suspended-animation until the present day, when a construction project in Berlin, Germany inadvertently uncovers them. The series explores the culture shock of people from the 1940s being revived in the present day: "I wanted to explore their reactions to us, and our reactions to them ... what was good about the World War II period that we lost, and what was not so good about it that we've eliminated in all but them".

== Publication history ==
In early 2009, Marvel editor-in-chief Joe Quesada announced a hiatus following issue #8 (Nov. 2008) because of Straczynski's increased demand as a screenwriter after the success of Changeling, and artist Weston's having working on concept art and storyboarding on a separate film project. The series remained on indefinite hiatus throughout 2009. In February 2010, Straczynski said that the series would be resuming later that year. In November of that year, with no further issues having appeared, Straczynski said Weston "has now caught up on the artwork", without specifying an issue or page-count, and that he intended to continue scripting. According to news site Bleeding Cool, as of April 2011, Weston had just begun inking pencils for issue eleven. The Twelve was completed in September. Issues 9 & 10 came out in February 2012, #11 in March, and #12 in April.

== Plot synopsis ==
As related by the Phantom Reporter: During the World War II Battle of Berlin in 1945, a dozen of the many superheroes and masked crimefighters of that era are ambushed by Nazis in the basement of an SS building, where the heroes are gassed and placed into cryogenic suspension for later experimentation, but the building is air bombed soon after and anyone aware of their situation is killed. In the present day, construction workers find this bunker, and the Twelve, as they become known, are revived. Put into the care of the U.S. military, they are housed together in a mansion where they receive counseling and support, are gradually made to understand that decades have passed, and are offered a role as heroes in the 21st century.

The Twelve adjust in various ways: The Blue Blade becomes a celebrity; the Phantom Reporter starts a column for the Daily Bugle, Dynamic Man allies himself with the FBI and other law-enforcement agencies and throws himself into heroics; the Black Widow reconnects as the "instrument of vengeance" of an unknown party and begins going on missions; and Rockman bemoans being cut off from an underground kingdom that may or may not exist. On ballistics evidence, police arrest the Laughing Mask for a 1940s murder. In addition, the daughter of the creator of the robot Electro reclaims possession of the robot.

In the framing story (set "much later"), the Phantom Reporter, gun in hand, stands over the body of the Blue Blade, regretting the man's death and vowing to find the killer.

The Phantom Reporter is ultimately able to reveal the killer, in a classic mystery setup that involves rounding up the rest of the cast from their various pursuits and explaining the events step by step. The recent spate of unexplained crimes, including an attack on a gay bar Dynamic Man had visited, was carried out by Electro under the control of Dynamic Man, who is forced to admit he also is an artificial being. Blue Blade, after hooking himself up to Electro's control apparatus, discovered this, and so Dynamic Man had Electro attack and kill him. Phantom Reporter has the Fiery Mask burn off Dynamic Man's costume, revealing him to be a "man" who will never be anatomically correct. It is inferred that his creator's phobias about sexual purity were transferred to Dynamic Man, thus explaining his discomfort with interracial marriages and the homophobia he has displayed throughout the series. He attacks the mansion, trying to trap and kill the others, but all manage to escape due to a sacrifice by Rockman.

Dynamic Man, after fleeing to his creator's home and laboratory, is confronted by Phantom Reporter along with Captain Wonder, Mastermind Excello, and Fiery Mask. Dynamic Man kills Fiery Mask by crushing his larynx, but FM manages to pass his powers along to the Phantom Reporter. Dynamic Man is destroyed by the Reporter, while Captain Wonder holds him in place, suffering horrible burns. Later, at a funeral for Fiery Mask, the others discuss their future plans. Mister E plans on retiring to spend time with his family, to make up for his previous rejection of his Jewish identity. Rockman is not found, though it's believed he escaped and may have finally found his lost underground world and family.

The Witness leaves, to work with S.H.I.E.L.D. to find those who deserve justice, with Nick Fury's blessing (they had a meeting at a pier in Italy). He is seen confronting a "wanted" man somewhere in Italy, at some later date. Phantom Reporter states he never saw The Witness again. Captain Wonder goes back into action, but with a gold half-mask covering his facial scars. Mastermind Excello has used his wealth to buy a private security company, renamed EXC Enterprises, and sets up Phantom Reporter and the Black Widow as operatives. Laughing Mask is given a deal (which views his cryogenic sleep as time served) for his previous crimes and now controls Electro, going after terrorists in sanctioned military strikes. Despite the history of loss, betrayal and punishment, the series ends on a note of hope for the survivors. In the closing scene, Phantom Reporter, in a new "combat suit" with a flame emblem, and Black Widow, in a new "spider web" costume, are seen heading towards a new mission at an unknown location, having been sent there by Mastermind Excello's "EXC Corporation".

== Membership ==
- Blue Blade (Roy Chambers) - A flamboyant, swashbuckling adventurer, with expert swordsmanship, acrobatic, and equestrian skills. After being thawed, he uses his abilities in an attempt to become a TV star. The circumstances of his murder make up the story's central mystery.
- Black Widow (Claire Voyant) - Unrelated to the modern heroines of the same name. Gifted by a demonic force with the power to kill evildoers with a single touch in order to claim their souls for Hell.
- Captain Wonder (Prof. Jeff Jordan) – A chemist with a genius-level intellect, a lab accident granted him superhuman strength & speed, enhanced senses, a healing factor, and the ability to fly.
- Dynamic Man ("Curt Cowan") - Secretly an android created by the bigoted and sex-averse Professor Simon Goettler, he has physical traits and senses far beyond those of humans.
- Electro - Unrelated to the modern supervillains of the same name. A remotely-piloted automaton created by Professor Philo Zog, who controlled it using a special psychic transmitter, which also allows a pilot to review the machine's previous actions.
- Fiery Mask (Jack Castle) - Has the mystical power to generate and control heat and flames. In dire circumstances, his powers can be passed to others in order to preserve them.
- Laughing Mask (Dennis Burton) - A former Assistant District Attorney turned violent vigilante, targeting those who the law could not touch. After he resumes his vigilante work upon being thawed, he is arrested for murder when ballistics tests connect him to gangland deaths from before the war.
- Master Mind Excello (Earl Everett) - After being shot in the head with a radioactive bullet intended for his father, developed mental abilities such as telepathy & remote viewing, drastically heightened senses, and limited precognition. These abilities come at great cost, as he is prone to sensory overload and his mental powers cause the remaining bullet fragments to push deeper into his brain.
- Mister E (Victor J. Goldstein/Victor Jay) - A wealthy, intelligent, and agile man who became a masked crimefighter primarily out of boredom. After being thawed, he attempts to reconnect with his now-elderly son, who resents his father's long absences while adventuring, as well as his rejection of their Jewish heritage.
- Phantom Reporter (Richard "Dick" Jones) - An accomplished athlete and news reporter, he became a crimefighter after his journalism work revealed how much wrongdoing managed to skirt the law. Of the Twelve, his adaptation to the modern world may be the smoothest, taking a new job at the Daily Bugle and resuming his crimefighting, while lamenting what he feels are negative changes in society as a whole.
- Rockman (possibly Daniel Rose) - A hulking, super-strong man with advanced mining and tunneling technology who claims to be the leader of a vast underground kingdom called "Abysmia." However, it is believed that he is actually Daniel Rose, a union leader who was trapped with his fellow workers in a West Virginia coal mine collapse, one that dropped the entire town of Tarleton into a sinkhole and killed his wife and daughter, causing him to have a psychotic break.
- Witness (real name unknown) - A former Chicago police detective who was imprisoned for accidentally shooting an innocent man. While attempting suicide in his cell, he is contacted by a supernatural force and charged with observing certain individuals to determine whether they are worth saving, through violence if necessary, or if they should be allowed to die from tragedies he is allowed to foresee.

== Collected editions ==
- Volume 1 (collects The Twelve #1–6, 144 pages, hardcover, October 2008, ISBN 0-7851-3372-0)
- Volume 2 (collects The Twelve #7–12 and The Twelve: Spearhead #1, hardcover, July 2012, ISBN 978-0-7851-3373-5)
- The Twelve (collects all 12 issues, softcover, 2014, ISBN 978-0-7851-5430-3)
- The Twelve (collects all 12 issues and The Twelve: Spearhead #1, hardcover, ISBN 978-0-7851-2715-4)

== Additional issues ==
- The Twelve #0 (Golden Age reprints, plus character designs, 2008)
- The Twelve #½ (Golden Age reprints, 2008)
- Spearhead #1 (one-shot, original story set in WWII by Chris Weston, May 2010)
- Daring Mystery 70th Anniversary Special (one-shot by David Liss, plus Golden Age reprints, 2009)
