= Headmen =

Fictional comic book villains

Publication information
- Publisher: Marvel Comics
- First appearance: The Defenders #21 (March 1975)
- Created by: Steve Gerber; Sal Buscema; Sal Trapani

In-story information
- Member(s): Dr. Jerold "Jerry" Morgan; Arthur Nagan; Thursday Rubinstein; Harvey Schlemerman

The Headmen is a group of supervillains appearing in American comic books published by Marvel Comics.

== Publication history ==
The Headmen first appeared (as a team) in The Defenders #21 (March 1975) and were created by Steve Gerber, Sal Buscema, and Sal Trapani.

== Fictional team biography ==
The Headmen are a group who believe that they should rule the world by virtue of their intellect. Dr. Arthur Nagan wanted society to operate like a precision instrument, Dr. Jerry Morgan wanted a society where his genius was recognized, Chondu the Mystic wanted personal wealth, and Ruby Thursday wanted to replace the head of every human with a plastic head of her own design. They fought the Defenders, the She-Hulk, and Spider-Man on different occasions.

Defenders writer Steve Gerber formed the Headmen from 1950s anthological horror-story characters appearing in the reprint title Weird Wonder Tales #7 (Dec. 1974). That comic's five reprinted stories included the introduction of Dr. Arthur Nagan, the Gorilla-Man, from Mystery Tales #21 (art by Bob Powell); Chondu the Mystic, from Tales of Suspense #9 (art by George Evans); and Dr. Jerry Morgan, a.k.a. Shrunken Bones, from World of Fantasy #11 (art by Angelo Torres).

The Headmen first appear in The Defenders #21. Nagan and Morgan are based out of a house in Westbury, Connecticut. Nagan recruits Chondu the Mystic into the Headmen in that issue. The group creates chaos by using Chondu's mental powers enhanced by a drug created by Morgan. The chaos serves as cover for Nagan to carry out a series of burglaries in the New York Diamond District. Nighthawk of the Defenders spots Nagan, but Nagan is able to escape.

In The Defenders #32 (Feb. 1976), the Headmen were joined by Gerber's newly created Ruby Thursday. The Headmen launched an elaborate scheme to secretly take economic and political control of the world. There were multiple components to the plan. Arthur Nagan created a business empire and formed a population control movement in India based on shrinking the size of humans. Ruby Thursday briefly ran for President of the United States. They were eventually defeated and captured by the Defenders at their headquarters in Norman, Oklahoma.

Later, Ruby Thursday was the instigator of the death of another Gerber creation, Omega the Unknown. In the same issue, Doctor Strange declared that Chondu's real name was Harvey Schlemerman, and Jack Norris, husband of the woman whose body was being used by the Valkyrie, claimed to have seen him perform.

The Headmen made an appearance in John Byrne's She-Hulk comic, during a period when he was reviving Marvel villains. They had kidnapped the She-Hulk for the purpose of giving Chondu a slightly more normal body than he currently sported. The She-Hulk was convinced that her head had been detached and placed on a life-support system, and Chondu's head affixed to her body, but this was not true. As she discovered with the aid of Spider-Man, the body that Chondu was using was actually a clone of hers.

They also turned up for one issue of the Defenders (vol. 2) relaunch, by Kurt Busiek and Erik Larsen. Chondu had an arachnid cyborg body for this outing.

The Headmen next appear in Heroes for Hire (vol. 2), where they reprogram a Doombot to assist them in battling Humbug.

== Members ==
- Dr. Arthur Nagan (the Gorilla-Man – name not used in the stories) (leader)
- Dr. Jerold "Jerry" Morgan (Shrunken Bones – name not used in the stories)
- Thursday Rubinstein (Ruby Thursday)
- Harvey Schlemerman (Chondu the Mystic)
