= Monsteroso =

Monsteroso can refer to two different characters appearing in American comic books published by Marvel Comics.

== Monsteroso (Amazing Adventures) ==
Monsteroso
- Cover to Amazing Adventures #5 (Oct. 1961). Pencils by Jack Kirby and Steve Ditko, inks by Dick Ayers.

Publication information
- Publisher: Marvel Comics
- First appearance: Amazing Adventures #5 (Oct. 1961)
- Created by: Stan Lee, Jack Kirby

In-story information
- Species: unknown
- Abilities: superhuman strength, endurance and durability

Monsteroso is a giant monster in Marvel Comics. It first appeared in Amazing Adventures #5 (Oct. 1961), and was created by Stan Lee and Jack Kirby.

=== Fictional character history ===
Monsteroso first appeared as an unnamed young passenger on an alien spacecraft passing near Earth. He accidentally launched himself in the vessel's lifeboat towards Earth, which crashed in Africa. Monsteroso was knocked unconscious in the impact.

The unconscious, almost comatose Monsteroso was discovered by a man named Phil, a circus owner from the United States. Thinking the creature dead, Phil had its body brought to the American Museum of Natural History in New York City. It is Phil who first names the creature "Monsteroso".

After healing, Monsteroso revives in the museum. The young alien, confused by its surroundings began rampaging through the city. The police attempted to stop him with conventional force (i.e. bullets and tear gas), unsuccessfully. Meanwhile, Phil realizes that Monsteroso's nature was childlike, not evil, and he convinced an Army scientist to sedate, rather than kill, the creature. After scaling the United Nations building, it is successfully sedated, and falls into the East River.

Immediately afterwards, an enormous spacecraft lands, and two enormous aliens disembark, Monsteroso's parents. They retrieve their child and prepare to depart, saying: "It is fortunate that he is unharmed! Fortunate for you!"

The story of Monsteroso's origin was reprinted in Marvel Comics' Monsters on the Prowl #28 (June 1974).

== Monsteroso (Tales to Astonish) ==
Monsteroso
- Panel from Tales to Astonish #18 (April 1961). Pencils and inks by Steve Ditko.

Publication information
- Publisher: Marvel Comics
- First appearance: Tales To Astonish #18 (April 1961)
- Created by: Stan Lee, Steve Ditko

In-story information
- Species: Sturdian
- Abilities: growth, superhuman strength

Monsteroso is another (apparently) giant monster in Marvel Comics. It first appeared in Tales to Astonish #18 (Apr 1961), and was created by Stan Lee and Steve Ditko.

=== Fictional character history ===
This Monsteroso was hatched in solitude from an egg on a planet apparently devoid of intelligent life otherwise. Soon after his birth, Monsteroso began to uncontrollably grow in size, larger and larger, with no apparent upper limit. Eventually, Monsteroso dwarfed even massive geological features like mountains. Being so large, Monsteroso hailed himself as conqueror and ruler of all he surveyed, until a flood came in which Monsteroso drowned. The "flood" was subsequently revealed to be a scientist washing out a glass slide, utterly unaware of the microscopic ecosystem that had lived within it.

In later mentions in the Marvel Universe, this Monsteroso was said to be an inhabitant of the Microverse.

The first appearance of this Monsteroso was reprinted in Fantasy Masterpieces #9 (June 1967).

== See also ==
- Monstro, a Marvel Comics monster also known as Giganto.
