= Betsy Ross (character) =

Marvel Comics character

Golden Girl
- Golden Girl (Betsy Ross) in Captain America Comics #66 (1948). Pencils by Syd Shores and inks by Ken Bald.

Publication information
- Publisher: Marvel Comics
- First appearance: Captain America Comics #1 (March, 1941)
- Created by: Joe Simon (writer); Jack Kirby (artist)

In-story information
- Alter ego: Betsy Ross
- Species: Human
- Team affiliations: Women's Auxiliary Army Corps; All-Winners Squad
- Supporting character of: Captain America
- Notable aliases: Agent X-13; G-Girl
- Abilities: Skilled hand-to-hand combatant; Bulletproof cape

Betsy Ross is a character appearing in American comic books published by Marvel Comics. Created by Joe Simon and Jack Kirby, the character first appeared in Captain America Comics #1 (March 1941). Betsy Ross is Captain America's early love interest and supporting character in American comic books published by Marvel Comics during the 1930-1940s period known to historians and collectors as the Golden Age of Comic Books. She then debuted as the superheroine Golden Girl in Captain America Comics #66 (April 1948).

== Publication history ==
Marvel Comics' first Golden Girl, Elizabeth Ross, first appeared, without yet a superhero identity, as Betty Ross in Captain America Comics #1 (March 1941). A supporting character who appeared in occasional stories, she assisted the U.S. Army and was a love interest for Steve Rogers, Captain America's real identity.

She succeeded Bucky as Captain America's sidekick in issue #66 (April 1948), in the 12-page story "Golden Girl", by an unconfirmed writer and by penciller Syd Shores. Later, it was retconned that this was not Steve Rogers but Jeff Mace, the superhero Patriot and the third man to be called Captain America.

Golden Girl appeared in Captain America stories through issue #74 (Oct. 1949), except for issue #71, and also in the Captain America stories in Marvel Mystery Comics #87-88 and #92 (Aug. & Oct. 1948, June 1949). Betsy's non-superhero design has changed over the years; when she first appeared she was blonde, but later stories had her with red hair and wearing a blonde wig as part of her Golden Girl costume.

The 2010 miniseries Captain America: Patriot retroactively revealed that she was the aunt of General Thunderbolt Ross, and the eponymous great-aunt of his daughter Betty Ross, two characters introduced in The Incredible Hulk #1 (May 1962).

== Fictional character biography ==
Immediately before and during most of World War II, Elizabeth (then known as Betty) Ross was a member of the U.S. Army's Women's Auxiliary Army Corps, and had previously worked as a waitress and later an FBI agent. She became a friend and eventual girlfriend of Army Private Steve Rogers, unaware of his dual identity as Captain America, whom she admired and who had saved her on more than one occasion. She was kind and resourceful, but not especially strong at first. Betsy investigated fortune tellers Sando and Omar and exposed them as spies. In issue #6 (Sept. 1941), she was captured by the Imperial Japanese spy known as Fang along with Bucky, but was rescued by Captain America. After the attack on Pearl Harbor and the United States' official entry into the war, she soon became involved in more missions that had her opposing Nazi and Imperial Japanese forces. Over the course of the comics, Ross grows into a tough and capable ally of Captain America and Bucky.

She had adapted her name slightly to Betsy Ross — the name of the U.S. colonial-era woman to whom legend ascribes sewing the first American flag — by the time that Captain America's sidekick, the second Bucky (Fred Davis) was shot and wounded. The third Captain America, Jeffrey Mace, who'd succeeded the M.I.A. Rogers and the killed-in-action William Naslund, revealed his civilian identity to Ross and gave her a bulletproof cape previously owned by Naslund and trained her as his new partner, the costumed crime-fighter Golden Girl.

For Ross' first mission as Golden Girl, she and Captain America investigated strange seismic activity in a city, leading them to encounter Mr. Zrr from Dimension Zee and assisted him in capturing Denton Smith and Cecil Babylon, two criminals who found safe haven in that dimension. After many more adventures, culminating in a battle with the Red Skull in Hell, Ross and Mace married by 1953 and eventually retired from their superhero duties.

After Mace died of cancer, Betsy moved to Valhalla Villas, a Florida retirement community for ex-heroes and ex-villains. She was one of the Golden Age heroes who went back into action one last time after being temporarily de-aged as part of the "Last Days" part of the "Secret Wars" storyline.

== Powers and abilities ==
Betsy Ross had no superpowers but was a skilled hand-to-hand combatant and wore a bulletproof cape that belonged to William Naslund, formerly the Spirit of '76.

== Critical reception ==
Deirdre Kaye of Scary Mommy called Betsy Ross a "role model" and "truly heroic." Megan Nicole O'Brien of CBR.com ranked Betsy Ross 7th in their "Marvel: 10 Best Golden Age Heroines" list.

== In other media ==
Betsy Ross appeared in the Captain America portion of The Marvel Super Heroes TV series (1966), voiced by Vita Linder.
