= Chondu the Mystic =

Publication information
- Publisher: Marvel Comics
- First appearance: Tales of Suspense #9 (May 1960)
- Created by: Doug Wildey; George Evans; Monstrous form: Steve Gerber; Sal Buscema

In-story information
- Full name: Harvey Schlemerman
- Team affiliations: Headmen; A.I.M. Circus of Crime
- Notable aliases: Nighthawk; Bambi; Chondu the Magician
- Abilities: Expertise in mysticism; In monstrous form: Superhuman strength, durability, and speed; Flight; Constriction; Natural weaponry

Chondu the Mystic, sometimes known as Chondu the Magician, is a fictional character appearing in American comic books published by Marvel Comics.

== Publication history ==
Chondu the Mystic first appeared in Tales of Suspense #9 and was created by Doug Wildey and George Evans while his monstrous form was created by Steve Gerber and Sal Buscema. His name likely derives from Chandu the Magician, a radio drama character who also served as an inspiration for Marvel's Dr. Strange.

== Fictional character biography ==
Chondu had previously worked in a sideshow as a magician before beginning a career as a criminal. In his first appearance, he lectured on yoga and sent an escaped convict to Limbo.

Chondu later joins the Headmen. Arthur Nagan transplants Chondu's brain into Nighthawk's body as part of an attempt to use the Defenders. Doctor Strange defeats him in a fight and mystically traps Chondu's consciousness in a fawn's body. Meanwhile, Nagan and Ruby Thursday transform Chondu into a chimeric monster with an artificial brain. Chondu attempts to kidnap a construction worker to use in a brain transplant, but encounters Valkyrie and is arrested.

The Headmen later hire Mysterio to capture the She-Hulk, and place Chondu's head on a clone of her body, which he does not appreciate. She-Hulk and Spider-Man battle the Headmen and decapitate Chondu, but he survives due to life-support equipment attached to his head.

In All-New, All-Different Marvel, Chondu appears as a bartender at the Bar with no Doors, a tavern frequented by various mystics.

== Powers and abilities ==
Chondu can perform intermediate magic as he is skilled in the mystic arts. In his monster form, he has immense physical attributes, winged flight, the ability to constrict people or objects with his tentacle-like arms, and razor-sharp weapons.
