= Answer (comics) =

Answer is the name of several supervillains appearing in American comic books published by Marvel Comics. The first incarnation of Answer, Aaron Nicholson, first appeared in Peter Parker, the Spectacular Spider-Man #91 (June 1984). The second incarnation, David Ferrari, debuted in Captain America (Vol. 3) #20 (June 1999). The third incarnation, an unnamed criminal, made his first appearance in Superior Spider-Man #26 (January 2014).

== Publication history ==
Aaron Nicholson debuted in Peter Parker, the Spectacular Spider-Man #91 (June 1984), created by writer Al Milgrom and artist Jim Mooney. David Ferrari debuted under the codename Answer after Aaron Nicholson's "death" in Captain America (Vol. 3) #20 (June 1999), created by Dan Jurgens. An unnamed criminal debuted under the codename Answer in Superior Spider-Man #26 (January 2014), created by Dan Slott and Christos Gage.

== Fictional character biography ==
=== Aaron Nicholson ===
Answer

Publication information
- Publisher: Marvel Comics
- First appearance: Peter Parker, the Spectacular Spider-Man #91 (June 1984)
- Created by: Al Milgrom (writer); Jim Mooney (artist)

In-story information
- Alter ego: Aaron Nicholson
- Species: Human mutate
- Team affiliations: Hydra
- Notable aliases: Answer
- Abilities: Ability to temporarily develop whatever superhuman attribute he needs for any situation; Superhuman intuition; Genius level intellect; Body armor granting the ability to slip from any grasp or prevent anything from adhering to him

Aaron Nicholson is a criminal genius and a former member of the Kingpin's criminal organization. He is a former hitman in the Las Vegas division of Hydra and was empowered by the laboratory machines of Farley Stillwell's brother Harlan Stillwell, becoming the Answer.

The Answer studies Spider-Man's powers, and then attacks Spider-Man and the Black Cat to test the limits of their powers. He kidnaps Black Cat to misdirect Spider-Man's attention as he steals Silvermane's body from the police morgue, and assists the Kingpin in partially resurrecting Silvermane. He then kidnaps Dagger in hopes that her powers would cure the Kingpin's ailing wife Vanessa. Silvermane rampages mindlessly; to end the rampage, the Answer sacrifices his corporeal form and converts himself to energy to revive Dagger, who possesses Silvermane's life force. The Answer manages to telepathically contact Doctor Octopus, who restores him to life.

Answer is hired by the Hood to take advantage of the split in the superhero community caused by the Superhuman Registration Act. He helps the Hood's gang fight the New Avengers, but is taken down by Doctor Strange. During the Secret Invasion storyline, Answer assists the Hood's syndicate in battling the invading Skrull force.

=== David Ferrari ===
Answer

Publication information
- Publisher: Marvel Comics
- First appearance: As David Ferrari: Captain America vol. 3 #20 (June 1999); As Answer: Captain America vol. 3 #42 (2000)
- Created by: Dan Jurgens

In-story information
- Alter ego: David Ferrari
- Species: Human
- Team affiliations: S.H.I.E.L.D. U.S. Army; Furnace
- Partnerships: Crimson Dynamo
- Notable aliases: Answer

David Ferrari is a former agent of S.H.I.E.L.D. and a member of the U.S. Army and Furnace. He is also the brother of Connie Ferrari. Ferrari leads a mission to an A.I.M. base to prevent the release of the Omega Compound. He later uses drugs to control Nick Fury, at which point he had allied with Crimson Dynamo in an attempt to steal missiles from Khamistan and take over Earth. He is opposed by Captain America.

=== Unnamed criminal ===
After Aaron Nicholson's apparent death, his gear was sold to Roderick Kingsley, who in turn gave it to an unknown criminal. Answer is present when Hobgoblin (Kingsley's butler Claude) leads his forces into battle against the Goblin King's Goblin Nation. After Hobgoblin is killed by Goblin King, Answer is among the villains who defect to the Goblin Nation.

== Powers and abilities ==
Aaron Nicholson

The first Answer underwent genetic manipulation to grant him the ability to develop any power needed in a certain situation. For example, if surrounded by thugs, he will gain superhuman strength and durability, allowing him to defeat them. In another situation, he may obtain pyrokinesis or the ability to turn himself into pure energy. Flight may be an ability that is always active. Other than that, at rest or not in any sort of situation, he will display no abilities. The powers he manifests typically last for five minutes, and he can display up to two separate powers at once. Additionally, Aaron Nicholson is highly intelligent and has a superhuman-like level of intuition. The Answer wears body armor that was created with the help of the Kingpin's scientists. The armor is coated with a friction-eliminating chemical that allows him to slip from any grasp and prevents anything from adhering to him.
