= The Witness (character) =

Comic-book character

The Witness is the name of at least three fictional characters appearing in American comic books published by Marvel Comics. Of these, the first was published by Timely Comics in the 1940s and the final two by its successor company, Marvel Comics.

== Timely Comics ==
The Witness
- Promotional art for The Twelve #5; Art by Paolo Rivera

Publication information
- Publisher: Marvel Comics
- First appearance: Mystic Comics #7 (Dec. 1941)
- Created by: Stan Lee (writer)

In-story information
- Species: Human
- Team affiliations: The Twelve
- Notable aliases: Judge; Juror; Avenger of Evil
- Abilities: Precognition; Mastery of combat and firearms

=== Publication history ===
The first Witness debuted in the eight-page story "The League of Blood" in the superhero anthology series Mystic Comics #7 (Dec. 1941), during the period fans and historians call the Golden Age of Comic Books. A costumed superhero in this incarnation, the character was created by writer Stan Lee, who wrote the stories under the pen name "S.T. Anley", and an unknown artist. This version of the character appeared in one story each in Mystic #7–9 (Dec. 1941 – May 1942).

Timely Comics house ad for The Witness #1 (Sept. 1948).

A Timely character called The Witness also appeared, in a different costume, as the star of the eponymous comic The Witness #1 (Sept. 1948), in three stories written by Lee and drawn variously by Ken Bald and Syd Shores, with Charles Nicholas providing the cover. The Grand Comics Database lists this character as a different entity than the Mystic Comics version, while Jess Nevins' "A Guide to Golden Age Marvel Characters" considers them the same man. However, according to The Twelve #1, the Witness of World War II was put in suspended animation during the year 1945, suggesting that the two are in fact different characters. This is further confirmed in the Official Handbook of the Marvel Universe A-Z Vol. 14.

This series lasted only one issue, but the character went on to narrate essentially anthological suspense stories in Ideal #4 (Jan. 1949), in a seven-page tale penciled by Gene Colan; Captain America Comics #71–72 (March–May 1949); Amazing Mysteries #32 (May 1949); and Marvel Mystery Comics #92 (June 1949).

The Mystic Comics Witness returned in the 12-issue miniseries The Twelve, by writer J. Michael Straczynski and artist Chris Weston.

=== Fictional character biography ===
The Witness is a Chicago detective who accidentally shot an innocent man in the line of duty. After serving two years in prison, he attempts to commit suicide. However, a mysterious voice tells him it is not his time, and charges him with the task of seeing a tragedy about to occur beforehand. He will then watch the impending victim for several days to judge if the person deserves saving, in which case he would either try to prevent the tragedy, or simply witness the event without becoming involved. Near the end of World War II, the Witness and a dozen other heroes became trapped by Nazi scientists and placed in suspended animation until they were awoken in the present day. After being re-acclimated into 21st century life, the Witness was seen working with Nick Fury.

Another incarnation of the Witness was merely a passive observer of crime and humanity's foibles, which he would report on a radio program.

=== Powers and abilities ===
The Witness possesses some sort of extrasensory perception allowing him to know when and where a crime will be committed, so he can observe it. He is a good unarmed combatant and proficient with various handguns.

== Other characters ==
=== New Universe ===
The Witness

Publication information
- Publisher: Marvel Comics
- First appearance: D.P. 7 Annual #1 (January 1987)
- Created by: Mark Gruenwald (writer); Lee Weeks (artist); Paul Ryan (artist, developer)

In-story information
- Alter ego: Nelson Kohler
- Species: Ghost
- Abilities: Flight; Invisibility; Intangibility; Possession

The Witness (Nelson Kohler) is a fictional character appearing in the comic books published by Marvel Comics, as part of the New Universe imprint. The Witness is a ghostly figure, an onlooker drawn to paranormal events.

==== Fictional character biography ====
Nelson Kohler was driving when the White Event occurred. He lost control of his car, crashed and was hospitalized, critically ill. He was later declared brain-dead and his life support system was switched off. His body died but his paranormal powers manifested, leaving him a bodiless ghost.

He felt an irresistible pull towards people who were developing paranormal powers, although he could not be seen or heard. Among those whose manifestations he witnessed were characters regularly published in the comic book DP7 (Randy O'Brien, David Landers, Stephanie Harrington, Charlotte Beck, Lenore Fenzl, Jeff Walters, and Dennis Cuzinski). He originally speculated on why he was drawn to these events, but ultimately concluded that there was no reason or pattern to his wanderings. Unable to participate in or affect the events he watched, he declared himself to be an unseen, impartial "witness".

He also felt drawn to the disaster known as The Pitt, after which he had strange experiences with other ghosts and other people seemed to be able to see him.

==== Powers and abilities ====
As a specter, Nelson Kohler has complete control over his ectoplasmic form that allows him to fly, turn invisible, pass through solid objects, and overshadow living beings. He is drawn to when and where humans first use their powers or to some other catastrophic event.

=== The X-Men ===
A character called the Witness (whose real name is LeBeau) has appeared in X-Men continuity, in XSE #4 (Feb. 1997), Bishop: The Last X-Man #3 & 14 (Dec. 1999 & Nov. 2000), and Gambit & Bishop #2–6 (April–Aug. 2001). The character is hinted to be a future version of Gambit.
