= Gorilla-Man =

Comic book superheroes

Gorilla-Man is an alias used by three different superheroes appearing in American comic books published by Marvel Comics, beginning in 1954 with the character of Kenneth Hale, and continuing with Arthur Nagan, who also first appeared in 1954, and Franz Radzik, who first appeared in 1962.

== Publication history ==
The character of Kenneth Hale first appeared in Men's Adventures #26 (March 1954).

Dr. Arthur Nagan first appeared in Mystery Tales #21 (Sept. 1954), and was created by Bob Powell. This story was reprinted in Weird Wonder Tales #7 (Dec. 1974). Steve Gerber created the Headmen after reading the reprint issue. The character subsequently appears in The Defenders #21 (March 1975), 31–33 (January–March 1976), 35 (May 1976), The Defenders Annual #1 (Oct. 1976), Power Man/Iron Fist #68 (April 1981), Marvel Age Annual #1 (1985), The Sensational She-Hulk vol. 2 #1–3 (May–July 1989), Avengers: Deathtrap: The Vault Graphic Novel (1991), Web of Spider-Man #73 (Feb. 1991), Marvel Comics Presents #97 (1992), The Defenders vol. 2 #5 (July 2001), 7–10 (Sept.–Dec. 2001), and Heroes for Hire #6–8 (March–May 2007). Gorilla-Man appeared as part of the "Headmen" entry in the original The Official Handbook of the Marvel Universe #5, and in the Official Handbook of the Marvel Universe Update '89 #3.

Franz Radzik first appeared in Tales to Astonish #28 (Feb. 1962).

== Fictional character biography ==
=== Kenneth Hale ===
Gorilla-Man
- Cover art for Agents of Atlas #2. Art by Tomm Coker.

Publication information
- Publisher: Marvel Comics
- First appearance: Men's Adventures #26 (March 1954)
- Created by: Robert Q. Sale (artist)

In-story information
- Full name: Kenneth Hale
- Species: Human (formerly); Enchanted Gorilla (currently)
- Team affiliations: Agents of Atlas; Nick Fury's Howling Commandos; Mercs for Money; Agents of Wakanda
- Abilities: Superhuman strength, stamina, durability, speed, agility, reflexes, dexterity, and sense of smell; Immortality; Weapon proficiency; Unarmed combat skills

Kenneth Hale was a happy-go-lucky soldier of fortune. He is characterised as risking his life for thrills, but with a fear of death. He heard of a local tribal legend from Africa that stated, "If you kill the magical Gorilla-Man, you become immortal". Hale traveled to Africa to find the Gorilla-Man. Hale abandoned his goal at the last minute, but his encounter with the Gorilla-Man forced him to shoot. Hale became immortal, but at the cost of becoming a Gorilla-Man himself. After operating his own team for a while, Hale retired, residing in a large treehouse near the Congo.

He served as a guide for the original X-Men and proved himself to be a formidable one. He was given a special yearbook and was acknowledged as an ally, or "X-Ape".

After Norman Osborn gains a position of power in the American government, Gorilla-Man and the Agents of Atlas begin working against Osborn's interests. To stop the acquisition of powerful weaponry, the Agents steal gold from Fort Knox.

As part of the 2016 Marvel NOW! branding, Gorilla-Man appears as a member of Domino's incarnation of the Mercs for Money.

During The War of the Realms storyline, Gorilla-Man is seen talking to Ursa Major about an undercover operation he is running for Black Panther, until Ka-Zar picks him up and takes him to Avengers Mountain. He helps Black Panther destroy the enemy forces that were attacking the mountain by activating a weapon inside the Celestial's body, but is wounded after a few Dark Elves infiltrate the mountain. While recovering, he talks to Odin and it is later revealed that he betrayed the Avengers for Dracula's Legion of the Unliving. Gorilla-Man is later seen helping Ka-Zar and Blade in fighting Roxxon's Berserkers when infiltrating their secret base in Antarctica.

=== Arthur Nagan ===
Gorilla-Man

Publication information
- Publisher: Marvel Comics
- First appearance: Mystery Tales #21 (Sept. 1954)
- Created by: Bob Powell

In-story information
- Full name: Arthur Nagan
- Species: Human mutate
- Team affiliations: Headmen; A.I.M. Circus of Crime; Lethal Legion
- Notable aliases: Dr. Ruhart Gnaan
- Abilities: Superhuman strength, stamina, durability, speed, agility, reflexes, and dexterity; Surgery mastery

Dr. Arthur Nagan is a former surgeon who took organs from gorillas to use in people. However, his scheme was thwarted by the gorillas, who transplanted his head onto a gorilla's body. He is a member of the Headmen and has fought the Defenders on several occasions. He is a former member of the Lethal Legion.

He later rejoined by the Headmen and participates in the plan to give his ally, Chondu, a new body — specifically, the body of a clone of She-Hulk. The Headmen hire the Ringmaster and his Circus of Crime, then later Mysterio to test She-Hulk for compatibility. She is subdued and cloned, but escapes with Spider-Man's help.

The Headmen track Spider-Man to a party Alicia Masters was hosting to procure Spider-Man's body for Chondu. Human Torch and Spider-Man defeat the enemies and the Headmen are soon arrested. Later allied with the A.I.M., they plotted to control an ancient space-god to rule the world. They resurrected the alien Orrgo and conquered the world with him, but the Defenders quickly defeated Orrgo and the Headmen.

Gorilla-Man is among the inmates of Prison 42. There, he is involved in a fight with Star-Lord, who is trying to stop Blastaar and his horde from invading Earth via the closed portal in the prison. Gorilla-Man sides with Blastaar's forces when the Shadow Initiative attempts to take the prison back. Despite inflicting heavy casualties on the Shadow Initiative's forces, Gorilla-Man and his allies are betrayed by fellow inmate Hardball.

During the "Secret Empire" storyline, Gorilla-Man appears in an underground lair where he was building an army of Gorilla-Men. These Gorilla-Men are the results of gorilla heads being surgically attached to human bodies. While attempting to decapitate Robert Maverick and use his head to strengthen his Gorilla-Men army, Gorilla-Man and his Gorilla-Men are attacked and defeated by Squirrel Girl, who unleashes her flying squirrels on his army.

=== Franz Radzik ===
Gorilla-Man
- The Franz Radzik version of Gorilla Man. From Tales to Astonish #28.

Publication information
- Publisher: Marvel Comics
- First appearance: Tales to Astonish #28 (Feb. 1962)
- Created by: Stan Lee, Larry Lieber (writers); Jack Kirby (artist)

In-story information
- Full name: Franz Radzik
- Species: Human (formerly); Gorilla (currently)
- Abilities: Superhuman strength, stamina, durability, speed, agility, reflexes, and dexterity

Franz Radzik, a scientist who created an electromagnetic ray machine to transfer his mind into a gorilla's body was known as Gorilla-Man. He was sent into deep space on an experimental rocket ship and first appeared in Tales to Astonish #28 and 30. The former story was reprinted in Adventure into Fear #5, the latter in Gorilla Man #3.

== Powers and abilities ==
As Gorilla-Man, Kenneth Hale possesses the body of a mountain gorilla, while retaining his normal human intelligence. He has access to various weapons with a preference for firearms. Even as a human, he is skilled at fighting. Hale also has been cursed with virtual immortality and maintained the same level of physical prowess over decades.

The Arthur Nagan version of Gorilla-Man is an experienced transplant surgeon and inventor. His large gorilla body possesses immense physical attributes.

The Franz Radzik version of Gorilla-Man has similar powers as the other two, but it left him unable to speak.

== Other versions ==
In an alternate Earth that appears in Avengers Forever #4–5, a similar version of Hale as Gorilla-Man appeared in the Avengers of the 1950s. Their timeline was destroyed by Immortus.

On Earth-O-Men, Ken Hale appears as the Gorilla-Man on an Earth dominated by the Skrulls.

== In other media ==
The Ken Hale incarnation of Gorilla-Man appears as a playable character in Lego Marvel Super Heroes 2 via the "Agents of Atlas" DLC.

== Collected editions ==
Title	Material Collected	Published Date	ISBN
Gorilla Man	Gorilla Man #1-3 and material from Weird Wonder Tales #7, Tales to Astonish #28 and 30, Avengers vs. Atlas #4, X-Men: First Class #8 and Men's Adventures #28.	December 15, 2010	978-0785149118
