= Black Widow (Claire Voyant) =

Marvel Comics character

Claire Voyant Black Widow
- Claire Voyant / Black Widow. Textless cover of The Twelve #8 (October 2008). Art by Paolo Rivera.

Publication information
- Publisher: Marvel Comics
- First appearance: Mystic Comics #4 (August 1940)
- Created by: George Kapitan (writer); Harry Sahle (artist)

In-story information
- Team affiliations: The Twelve
- Abilities: Superhuman strength and durability; Appearance alteration; Teleportation; Invulnerability; Death touch; Flight; Immortality

Black Widow (Claire Voyant) is a character appearing in American comic books published by Marvel Comics. Created by writer George Kapitan and artist Harry Sahle, the character first appeared in Mystic Comics #4 (August 1940), published by Marvel predecessor Timely Comics. Claire Voyant is an anti-heroine who kills evildoers to deliver their souls to her master, Satan.

== Publication history ==
The Black Widow makes five appearances during the period fans and historians call the Golden Age of comic books, all five written by George Kapitan. These short comics stories (the longest is eight pages, the shortest five) are spread among three different Timely anthology titles over a three-year period from 1940 to 1943.

Madame Claire Voyant is introduced in Mystic Comics #4 as "the strangest, most terrifying character in action picture magazines — the Black Widow. You've heard of the black widow spider — that evil creature whose bite spells doom. Now start the adventures of another black widow — a human tool of Satan whose very touch means death." Both Mystic Comics #4 and #5 (August 1940, March 1941) feature artwork by Harry Sahle (the stories are "Introducing the Black Widow," 7 pages, and "Garvey Lang," 8 pages, respectively). Another Mystic Comics appearance in issue #7 (December 1941) has art by Stan Drake ("Lewis & Sykes," 5 pages). USA Comics #5 (Summer 1942) is penciled by Mike Sekowsky and inked by George Klein ("Murder Unlimited," 5 pages). Her final Golden Age appearance in All Select Comics #1 (Fall 1943) has art tentatively attributed to Drake ("Blood Money," 5 pages); this story is reprinted in 1974, along with the rest of the issue, by publisher Alan L. Light's company Flashback as Special Edition Reprints #14.

According to Jess Nevins' Encyclopedia of Golden Age Superheroes, "The Black Widow can kill with a touch and has other, Satan-derived, plot device powers. The wrongdoers she goes after are ordinary humans, although one group of them call themselves Murder, Unlimited and another is the Cult of the Black Widow Spiders."

Her next appearance occurs 51 years later, in a flashback cameo in one panel of issue #1 (January 1994) of the mini-series Marvels ("A Time of Marvels," written by Kurt Busiek with art by Alex Ross), and again eleven years later (February 2005), also in brief flashback, in Marvel Knights Spider-Man #9 ("The Last Stand," written by Mark Millar with art by Terry and Rachel Dodson).

The Black Widow returns, finally in full-length stories, albeit as part of an ensemble cast, beginning in 2008 in The Twelve (written by J. Michael Straczynski with art by Chris Weston). The character appears in all 12 issues of The Twelve, in addition to a one-shot titled The Twelve: Spearhead.

She appears in the anthology, Marvel, in a story set just after World War II in which she brings the Red Skull, possibly George Maxon, to Hell to marry her.

== Fictional character biography ==
In 1940, Claire Voyant is a spirit medium who communicates with the dead through supernatural means. While serving a family named the Waglers, she is possessed by Satan to put a curse on them. James Wagler, a member of the family, survives a subsequent car crash provoked by the spell and, upon returning to Claire's quarters, guns her down.

Satan brings Voyant's soul to Hell, where he dresses her in her Black Widow costume. He also gives her the power to kill with a single touch of her fingers to the head (which leaves a branded "Black Widow mark") and other mystical tricks. Satan sends her back to Earth to avenge her death. After killing her murderer, she returns to Satan who, no longer content to wait for evil souls to die a natural death and perhaps repent their sins in the interim, charges her with bringing those souls to him. "On the upper world are mortal creatures whose hearts are blackened with wickedness and corruption. You, the Black Widow, will bring their evil souls to me!"

She later kills corrupt arms manufacturers, crime boss Garvey Lang, members of a syndicate called Murder Unlimited and the villain Ogor, while also healing Ogor's victim.

In Marvels, she is shown in flashback as part of a group of Timely's Golden Age characters aiding the Invaders against the Nazis.

In The Twelve, Claire Voyant is retconned as becoming the Black Widow in 1928 after her sister is murdered. Standing over her sister's grave, she wishes for the power to avenge herself against the killer, and Satan responds.

Revived in the present day, along with 11 other heroes, after being in suspended animation since World War II, she recommences serving as an "instrument of vengeance" for an initially unidentified entity (though never actually referred to as Satan, the Black Widow's master is identified as "the devil" in later issues) and going on missions for that party.

== Personality ==
A recurrent character trait of the Black Widow in her Golden Age appearances is that she shows no hesitation or mercy when it comes to killing her victims, and no apparent remorse over depriving them of their lives and sending their souls to Hell for eternal torment. Whether this ruthless aspect of her personality is original to Claire Voyant or a result of her resurrection by Satan as the Black Widow is unclear. In her appearances in The Twelve she is much less a willing killer, and is shown crying after killing.

In her Golden Age appearances, she does possess great compassion for those she perceives as innocent victims of evil, and a willingness to use her powers to protect and even heal them. This is shown most clearly in her final Golden Age story. When she is sent by Satan to harvest the soul of Ogor, a charlatan faith healer who has been stealing money from those who come to him for cures, after confronting Ogor and causing his death – though he dies of fright and heart failure rather than the Black Widow’s signature death touch, the result is the same and his blackened soul goes instantly to Hell – she then takes the time, and uses her powers, to regenerate the amputated leg of a young boy named Pepito, whom Ogor had promised to heal.

== Costumes ==
During her five brief appearances in the Golden Age, the Black Widow wears four distinctly different costumes, with different designs and different color schemes, and has three different hair colors.

Her first costume in Mystic Comics #4 consists of a purple bodysuit with spider design on the belly, a green-and-blue striped cape, and red boots with yellow flame designs around the tops.

For her second appearance in Mystic Comics #5, the red boots with yellow flame trim survive, but the bodysuit becomes plain black with no spider design and the color of her cape changes to solid red. The color scheme and basic layout of the costume remain the same in a later appearance in Mystic Comics #7, however the bodysuit acquires dark blue highlights, and the red cape now has flame designs around its hem. Both the "flames" and the cape itself are the same shade of red. Though highly similar to the costume in Mystic Comics #5, it is different in its particulars. The cape is held in place with a circular, gold-colored pin inset with a death’s head skull. Her hair remains blond for all three Mystic Comics appearances.

Her costume changes radically in U.S.A. Comics #5. The outfit's colors are now red, white and blue. The costume itself consists of a bright red bodysuit, a cape (colored either white or blue depending on the panel in question) with upturned Peter Pan collar, and white buccaneer boots. Her hair is now pure white.

For her final Golden Age appearance in All-Select Comics #1, the costume morphs into a blue bodysuit that, unlike any of her previous outfits, covers her legs as well as torso and arms, and a yellow cape. The boots with flame trim return, however both the boots and "flames" are yellow. The Black Widow is now a redhead.

Throughout the majority of The Twelve, she wears a fifth outfit, a minor redesign of the first, consisting of a dark purple bodysuit with, in a lighter shade of purple, a spider design on the belly. Her boots are the same dark purple as the bodysuit, with no "flames"; the cape is light purple, and likewise has no flame trim. She later wears a sixth costume, which is gray, covers her entire body except head and hands, and features a fine spiderweb pattern over much of its surface.

== Powers and abilities ==
Before her transformation, Claire Voyant has undefined psychic powers enabling her to communicate with the spirits of the dead. Resurrected by Satan as the Black Widow, she has been granted supernatural powers she uses to harvest the souls of evildoers for Satan. Claire Voyant has a death touch power. When she touches a victim on the forehead they are instantly struck dead, their soul is sent to Hell, and a mark is left in the shape of a spider. She possesses superhuman strength. She can alter her appearance. She is able to teleport between Hell and the mortal world at will. She has the power to heal others. Claire Voyant has the ability to fly. The character is shown to be bulletproof. Additionally, Satan states he has made the Black Widow immortal.

== Historical importance ==
Introduced in Mystic Comics #4 (August 1940), Claire Voyant/Black Widow is the first female, costumed, superpowered comic book character. Magician from Mars debuted in Amazing Man Comics #7 (November 1939) but has no distinctive costume. Fantomah was introduced in Jungle Comics #1 (February 1940) and possesses superpowers but also has no distinctive costume. The Woman In Red debuted in Thrilling Comics #2 (March 1940) and does wear a distinctive costume but has no superpowers. Invisible Scarlet O'Neil is a non-costumed character with the superpower of invisibility who debuted in a newspaper comic strip on June 3, 1940, rather than a comic book.

== Critical response ==
Deirdre Kaye of Scary Mommy included Claire Voyant on her list of "role model" and "truly heroic" female Marvel characters. Darby Harn of Screen Rant included Claire Voyant in their "10 Best Versions Of Black Widow From Marvel Comics" list. Megan Nicole O'Brien of Comic Book Resources ranked Claire Voyant 5th in their "Marvel: 10 Best Golden Age Heroines" list.

== Video games ==
- Claire Voyant / Black Widow appears as a playable character in Marvel: Contest of Champions.
